= List of Gaelic games clubs in Mayo =

This is a list of Gaelic football and hurling clubs in County Mayo.

== List of clubs ==
Club	Irish name	Dominant Sport	Division	Division (B team)	Division (C team)	Club colours
Eastern Gaels GAA	CLG Gaeil an Oirthir	Football	Junior	N/a	N/a	
Swinford GAA	CLG Baile atha na Muice	Football	Intermediate	East Mayo Junior B	N/a	
Bohola-Moy Davitts GAA	CLG Deibhidigh na Muaidhe	Football	Senior	East Mayo Junior B	N/a	
Kiltimagh GAA	CLG Coillte Mach	Football	Intermediate	East Mayo Junior B	N/a	
Kilmovee Shamrocks GAA	CLG Seamrog Cill Mobhi	Football	Junior	N/a	N/a	
Aghamore GAA	CLG Achadh Mor	Football	Senior	East Mayo Junior B	N/a	
Charlestown Sarsfields GAA	CLG Baile Chatail	Football	Senior	East Mayo Junior B	N/a	
Tooreen GAA	CLG Tuarín	Hurling	Senior	N/a	N/a	
Ballyhaunis GAA	CLG Baile atha hAmhnais	Football	Intermediate	East Mayo Junior B	N/a	
Ballaghadereen GAA	CLG Balach an Doirín	Football	Senior	East Mayo Junior B	N/a	
Mayo Gaels GAA	CLG Gael Maigh Eo	Football	Intermediate	South Mayo Junior	N/a	
Kilmaine GAA	CLG Cill Mheain	Football	Junior	N/a	N/a	
The Neale GAA	CLG An Eill	Football	Senior	South Mayo Junior	N/a	
Shrule Glencorrib GAA	CLG Struthair-Glean Coirib	Football	Junior	South Mayo Junior	N/a	
Garrymore GAA	CLG Garraí Mor	Football	Senior	South Mayo Junior	N/a	
Hollymount Carramore GAA	CLG Maolla	Football	Intermediate	South Mayo Junior	N/a	
Davitts GAA	CLG Na Daibheadí	Football	Senior	South Mayo Junior	N/a	
Ballinrobe GAA	CLG Baile an Roba	Football	Intermediate	South Mayo Junior	N/a	
Carras GAA	CLG Carras	South				
Claremorris GAA	CLG Clar Chlainne Mhuiris	South				
Bonnieconlon	CLG Muine Chonlain	North				
Killala	CLG Cill Ala	North				
Ardnaree GAA	CLG Ard na Riagh	North				
Ardagh GAA	CLG Ard Achadh	North				
Ballina Stephenites GAA	CLG Beal an Atha	North				
Ballycastle GAA	CLG Baile an Caislean	North				
Ballycroy GAA	CLG Baile Cruaigh	North				
Belmullet GAA	CLG Beal an Mhuirthead	North				
Crossmolina Deel Rovers GAA	CLG Crois Mhaioliona	North				
Kilcommon GAA	CLG Cill Chomáin	North				
Kilfian GAA	CLG Cill Fhaoin	North				
Kiltane GAA	CLG Cill tSionach	North				
Knockmore GAA	CLG Cnoc Mor	North				
Lacken GAA	CLG Leachan	North				
Lahardane GAA	CLG Leathardán	North				
Moygownagh GAA	CLG Math Gamhnach	North				
Achill GAA	CLG Acla	West				
Westport GAA	CLG Cathair na Mart	West				
Ballintubber GAA	CLG Baile an Tobair	West				
Balla GAA	CLG An Balla	West				
Breaffy GAA	CLG Breachmhaigh	West				
Burrishoole GAA	CLG Buiréis Umhaill	West				
Castlebar Mitchels GAA	CLG Na Mistealí	West				
Castlebar Hurling	CLG Na Mistealí	West				
Islandeady GAA	CLG Oilean Eadai	West				
Kilmeena GAA	CLG Cill Mhiodhna	West				
Louisburgh GAA	CLG Cluain Cearbhán	West				
Parke-Keelogues-Crimlin	CLG An Pháirc	West				
Tuar Mhic Éadaigh	CLG Thuar Mhic Éadaigh	West				
