= 2019 Mayo Senior Football Championship =

Tournament details
- County: Mayo
- Year: 2019
- Trophy: Paddy Moclair Cup
- Sponsor: Connacht Gold
- Teams: 16
- Defending champions: Ballintubber

Winners
- Champions: Ballintubber (5th win)
- Manager: Kevin Johnson
- Captain: Damien Coleman
- Qualify for: Connacht Club SFC

Runners-up
- Runners-up: Ballaghaderreen
- Captain: Seamus Cunniffe

Promotion/Relegation
- Relegated team(s): Hollymount-Carramore

The 2019 Mayo Senior Football Championship was the 118th edition of the Mayo GAA's premier gaelic football tournament for senior clubs in County Mayo, Ireland. Sixteen teams competed with the winners going on to represent Mayo in the Connacht Senior Club Football Championship. The championship started with a group stage and progressed to a knock out stage. The winners received the Paddy Moclair Cup.

Belmullet returned to the top-flight for the first time in over 40 years (they last claimed the I.F.C. title in 1974), having claimed the 2018 Mayo Intermediate Football Championship title with a final victory over Burrishoole.

Ballintubber were the defending champions after they defeated Breaffy in the 2018 final. They successfully defended their title and claimed a "2-in-a-row" of Paddy Moclair Cups and their 5th overall when defeating Ballaghaderreen in the final at McHale Park.

Hollymount-Carramore were relegated to the 2020 I.F.C. after 4 seasons in the top-flight of Mayo football when losing their Relegation Final to Moy Davitts.

== Team changes ==
As 2018 Intermediate Champions, Belmullet were promoted to the Senior Championship for 2019. They took the place of Crossmolina Deel Rovers, who were relegated from the 2019 I.F.C. at the end of the 2018 season.

== Clubs ==
The 2019 Championship was contested by 16 clubs: 4 of them from South Mayo, 4 from North Mayo, 4 from West Mayo, 4 from East Mayo.

Team	Team colours	Position in 2018
Aghamore		
Ballaghaderreen		
Ballina Stephenites		
Ballintubber		Champions
Belmullet		I.F.C. Champions
Breaffy		Finalists
Castlebar Mitchels		
Charlestown Sarsfields		
Claremorris		
Davitts		
Garrymore		
Hollymount-Carramore		
Kiltane		
Knockmore		
Moy Davitts		
Westport		

== Group stage ==
All 16 teams entered the competition at this stage. The top 2 teams in each group qualified for the quarter-finals while the bottom team of each group entered a Relegation Playoff. All teams played one home match, one away match and one match at a neutral venue. In the event of two teams finishing on the same points total, placings were decided by head-to-head record between the teams, then by scoring difference.

=== Group 1 ===
Team	Pld	W	L	D	PF	PA	PD	Pts
Breaffy	3	3	0	0	56	27	+29	6
Davitts	3	2	1	0	48	36	+12	4
Kiltane	3	1	2	0	33	51	-18	2
Moy Davitts	3	0	3	0	23	45	-22	0

Round 1

- Davitts 0–7, 1-10 Breaffy, 13/4/2019,
- Kiltane 0-7, 0-6 Moy Davitts, 13/4/2019,

Round 2

- Moy Davitts 0–9, 2-12 Davitts, 24/8/2019,
- Breaffy 0-22, 0-12 Kiltane, 25/8/2019,

Round 3

- Breaffy 1-17, 0-8 Moy Davitts, Charlestown, 7/9/2019,
- Davitts 3-14, 2-8 Kiltane, McHale Park, 7/9/2019,

=== Group 2 ===
Team	Pld	W	L	D	PF	PA	PD	Pts
Castlebar Mitchels	3	2	0	1	37	31	+6	5
Ballina Stephenites	3	1	0	2	41	35	6	4
Aghamore	3	1	2	0	29	31	-2	2
Westport	3	0	2	1	29	39	-10	1

Round 1

- Castlebar Mitchels 0–12, 1-9 Ballina Stephenites, 13/4/2019,
- Aghamore 1–5, 0-8 Westport, 13/4/2019,

Round 2

- Westport 0–10, 0-14 Castlebar Mitchels, 24/8/2019,
- Ballina Stephenites 1–9, 0-12 Aghamore, 24/8/2019,

Round 3

- Ballina Stephenites 1-14, 0-11 Westport, McHale Park, 7/9/2019,
- Castlebar Mitchels 0-11, 0-9 Aghamore, Claremorris, 7/9/2019,

=== Group 3 ===
Team	Pld	W	L	D	PF	PA	PD	Pts
Ballintubber	3	2	1	0	49	35	+14	4
Knockmore	3	2	1	0	43	39	+4	4
Garrymore	3	1	1	1	40	41	-1	3
Hollymount-Carramore	3	0	2	1	35	52	-17	1

Round 1

- Hollymount-Carramore 1–3, 0-18 Ballintubber, 13/4/2019,
- Knockmore 1-9, 1-5 Garrymore, 13/4/2019,

Round 2

- Ballintubber 2-10, 1-8 Knockmore, 24/8/2019,
- Garrymore 1–11, 0-14 Hollymount-Carramore, 25/8/2019,

Round 3

- Garrymore 2-12, 1-12 Ballintubber, Ballinrobe, 7/9/2019,
- Knockmore 2-14, 2-9 Hollymount-Carramore, Charlestown, 7/9/2019,

=== Group 4 ===
Team	Pld	W	L	D	PF	PA	PD	Pts
Ballaghaderreen	3	3	0	0	46	40	+6	6
Belmullet	3	2	1	0	40	36	+4	4
Charlestown Sarsfields	3	1	2	0	36	38	-2	2
Claremorris	3	0	3	0	44	52	-8	0

Round 1

- Ballaghaderreen 2-10, 1-12 Claremorris, 13/4/2019,
- Belmullet 0-8, 0-7 Charlestown Sarsfields, 13/4/2019,

Round 2

- Charlestown Sarsfields 0–12, 2-8 Ballaghaderreen, 24/8/2019,
- Claremorris 0–13, 2-13 Belmullet, 25/8/2019,

Round 3

- Ballaghaderreen 1-13, 0-13 Belmullet, Ballina, 8/9/2019,
- Charlestown Sarsfields 1-14, 0-16 Claremorris, Aghamore, 8/9/2019,

== Knock-Out Stage ==
=== Quarter-finals ===
21 September 2019
Quarter Final

Ballintubber	1-12 – 1-8	Belmullet

, Ballina

21 September 2019
Quarter Final

Ballina Stephenites	2-13 – 0-14	Breaffy

McHale Park, Castlebar

21 September 2019
Quarter Final

Ballaghaderreen	2-16 – 0-8	Davitts

McHale Park, Castlebar

22 September 2019
Quarter Final

Castlebar Mitchels	1-12 – 0-13	Knockmore

McHale Park, Castlebar

=== Semi-finals ===
5 October 2019
19:30
Semi Final

Ballintubber	1-10 – 0-6	Ballina Stephenites

McHale Park, Castlebar

6 October 2019
15:00
Semi Final

Ballaghaderreen	0-15 – 0-8	Castlebar Mitchels

McHale Park, Castlebar

=== Final ===
20 October 2019
Final

Report

Ballintubber	1-14 – 1-11	Ballaghaderreen

McHale Park, Castlebar

== Relegation Playoffs ==
The four teams who finished bottom of their groups entered the relegation play-offs, with the two losers of the semi-finals meeting in the relegation play-off final. All games are played at neutral venues.

=== Relegation Semi-Finals ===
22 September 2019
Relegation Semi-Final

Westport	3-16 – 0-3	Moy Davitts

, Ballyheane

22 September 2019
Relegation Semi-Final

Claremorris	4-14 – 0-8	Hollymount-Carramore

, Ballindine

=== Relegation Final ===
6 October 2019
12:00
Relegation Final

Moy Davitts	2-11 - 1-12 v	Hollymount-Carramore

, Claremorris
