= 2015 Mayo Senior Football Championship =

Mayo S.F.C.
- Season: 2015
- Champions: Castlebar Mitchels; 29th Senior Championship Title
- Relegated: Shrule-Glencorrib
- Connacht SCFC: Castlebar Mitchels
- All Ireland SCFC: n/a
- Winning Captain: ???
- Man of the Match: ???

The 2015 Mayo Senior Football Championship was the 114th edition of the Mayo GAA's premier club Gaelic football tournament for senior graded teams in County Mayo, Ireland. The tournament consists of 16 teams, with the winner going on to represent Mayo in the Connacht Senior Club Football Championship. The championship starts with a group stage and then progresses to a knock out stage.

Ballintubber were the defending champions after they defeated Castlebar Mitchels in the previous years final, however they lost their crown at the Semi-Final stage, being defeated by Breaffy.

This was Ballyhaunis' first return to the senior grade in over 20 years after claiming the Mayo Intermediate Football Championship title, 26 years after they won their last Intermediate crown in 1988.

On 26 October 2015, Castlebar Mitchels claimed their 29th S.F.C. title when defeating Breaffy 4-10 to 0-9 in McHale Park.

Shrule-Glencorrib were relegated to the Intermediate ranks for 2016 after 12 years as a senior club.

== Team changes ==
The following teams have changed division since the 2014 championship season.

=== To S.F.C. ===
Promoted from I.F.C.

- Ballyhaunis - (Intermediate Champions)

=== From S.F.C. ===
Relegated to I.F.C.

- Westport

== Group stage ==
All 16 teams enter the competition at this stage. The top 2 teams in each group go into the Quarter-Finals while the bottom team of each group will enter a Relegation Playoff. For all group matches the home team is named first.

=== Group A ===
Team	Pld	W	L	D	PF	PA	PD	Pts
Breaffy	3	3	0	0	58	33	+25	6
Kncokmore	3	2	1	0	42	39	+3	4
Davitts	3	0	2	1	33	42	-9	1
Ballyhaunis	3	0	2	1	35	54	-19	1

Round 1:

- Davitts 1-9, 1-10 Breaffy, 24/5/2015,
- Knockmore 0-15, 1-9 Ballyhaunis, 24/5/2015,

Round 2:

- Davitts 0-9, 1-14 Knockmore, 20/6/2015,
- Breaffy 5-12, 0-11 Ballyhaunis, 21/6/2015,

Round 3:

- Knockmore 1-7, 3-9 Breaffy, 28/6/2015,
- Ballyhaunis 0-12, 1-9 Davitts, 28/6/2015,

=== Group B ===
Team	Pld	W	L	D	PF	PA	PD	Pts
Castlebar Mitchels	3	3	0	0	47	24	+23	6
Ballina Stephenites	3	2	1	0	33	30	+3	4
Ballaghaderreen	3	1	2	0	27	29	-2	2
Claremorris	3	0	3	0	25	49	-24	0

Round 1

- Ballina Stephenites 1-11, 0-7 Claremorris, 23/5/2015,
- Castlebar Mitchels 0-10, 0-6 Ballaghaderreen, 23/5/2015,

Round 2

- Castlebar Mitchels 1-12, 1-6 Ballina Stephenites, 20/6/2015,
- Ballaghaderreen 1-10, 0-9 Claremorris, 21/6/2015,

Round 3

- Ballina Stephenites 0-10, 0-8 Ballaghaderreen, 27/6/2015,
- Claremorris 0-9, 2-16 Castlebar Mitchels, 27/6/2015,

=== Group C ===
Team	Pld	W	L	D	PF	PA	PD	Pts
Ballintubber	3	3	0	0	57	28	+29	6
Aghamore	3	1	2	0	35	33	+2	2
Crossmolina Deel Rovers	3	1	2	0	32	42	-10	2
Ballinrobe	3	1	2	0	40	61	-21	2

Round 1

- Ballintubber 1-23, 1-8 Ballinrobe, 24/5/2015,
- Aghamore 0-7, 0-8 Crossmolina Deel Rovers, 30/5/2015,

Round 2

- Ballinrobe 3-9, 2-11 Crossmolina Deel Rovers, 20/6/2015,
- Aghamore 0-10, 2-8 Ballintubber, 21/6/2015,

Round 3

- Ballintubber 2-11, 0-7 Crossmolina Deel Rovers, 27/6/2015,
- Ballinrobe 1-8, 1-15 Aghamore, 27/6/2015,

=== Group D ===
Team	Pld	W	L	D	PF	PA	PD	Pts
Kiltane	3	2	0	1	44	41	+3	5
Garrymore	3	2	1	0	56	35	+21	4
Charlestown Sarsfields	3	1	1	1	46	41	+5	3
Shrule-Glencorrib	3	0	3	0	36	65	-29	0

Round 1

- Kiltane 1-16, 1-14 Shrule-Glencorrib, 24/5/2015,
- Garrymore 2-12, 1-11 Charlestown Sarsfields, 24/5/2015,

Round 2

- Kiltane 1-10, 1-9 Garrymore, 20/6/2015,
- Shrule-Glencorrib 1-8, 2-14 Charlestown Sarsfields, 21/6/2015,

Round 3

- Garrymore 3-17, 0-8 Shrule-Glencorrib, 28/6/2015,
- Charlestown Sarsfields 0-12, 1-9 Kiltane, 28/6/2015,

== Knock-Out Stages ==
=== Relegation Playoffs ===
Relegation Semi-Finals:

- Claremorris 1-16, 0-12 Ballinrobe, Hollymount, 26/9/2015,
- Ballyhaunis 0-11, 0-10 Shrule/Glencorrib, Claremorris, 27/9/2015,

Relegation Final:

- Ballinrobe 5-6, 2-4 Shrule/Glencorrib, Hollymount, 4/10/2015,

=== Finals ===
The top 8 teams from the league stages qualify for a random unseeded draw for the Quarter-Finals.

Quarter-Finals		Semi-Finals		Final
Breaffy	2-12
Garrymore	0-14	Breaffy	4-7
Ballintubber	0-16'	Ballintubber	1-12
Ballina Stephenites	0-7			Breaffy	0-9
Knockmore	5-21			Castlebar Mitchels	4-10
Kiltane	3-7	Knockmore	2-12
Castlebar Mitchels	5-13	Castlebar Mitchels	4-15
Aghamore	1-7

Quarter-Finals:

- Knockmore 5-21, 3-7 Kiltane, James Stephens Park, 3/10/2015,
- Breaffy 2-12, 0-14 Garrymore, McHale Park, 26/9/2015,
- Castlebar Mitchels 5-13, 1-7 Aghamore, McHale Park, 26/9/2015,
- Ballintubber 0-16, 0-7 Ballina Stephenites, Pearse Park, 27/9/2015,

Semi-Finals:

- Breaffy 4-7, 1-12 Ballintubber, McHale Park, 11/10/2015,
- Castlebar Mitchels 4-15, 2-12 Knockmore, McHale Park, 11/10/2015,

Final:

- Castlebar Mitchels 4-10, 0-9 Breaffy, McHale Park, 26/10/2015,

26 October 2015; 3:00pm Final	Castlebar Mitchels	4-10 - 0-9	Breaffy	McHale Park, Castlebar; Referee: Liam Devenney; Man of the Match: Neil Douglas
26 October 2015; 3:00pm Final	Neil Douglas 3-1 (0-1f), Danny Kirby 1-3, Aidan Walsh 0-3f, Eoghan O'Reilly, Richie Feeney, James Durcan 0-1 each	Report	Conor O'Shea 0-4 (0-2f), Rob Hennelly (0-1f), Seamus O'Shea, Gary Walsh, Tommy O'Reilly (0-1f), Peter Dravins 0-1 each	McHale Park, Castlebar; Referee: Liam Devenney; Man of the Match: Neil Douglas

== Championship statistics ==
=== Miscellaneous ===
- Ballyhaunis return to the senior grade for the first time since 1995.
