= 2016 Mayo Senior Football Championship =

Mayo S.F.C.
- Season: 2016
- Champions: Castlebar Mitchels (30th S.F.C. Title)
- Relegated: Ballyhaunis
- Connacht SCFC: Castlebar Mitchels
- All Ireland SCFC: n/a
- Winning Captain: Rory Byrne (Castlebar Mitchels)
- Man of the Match: Paddy Durcan (Castlebar Mitchels)

The 2016 Mayo Senior Football Championship was the 115th edition of the Mayo GAA's premier gaelic football tournament for senior clubs in County Mayo, Ireland. Sixteen teams compete with the winner representing Mayo in the Connacht Senior Club Football Championship. The championship starts with a group stage and progresses to a knock out stage. The winners receive the Paddy Moclair Cup.

Castlebar Mitchels were the defending champions after they defeated rivals Breaffy in the 2015 final. They successfully defended their title to claim a "2-in-a-row" and their 30th overall when they defeated Knockmore 3-13 to 0-10 in McHale Park on 29 October 2016.

Ballyhaunis were relegated to the 2017 I.F.C.

This year Hollymount-Carramore made their debut in the senior grade after just 6 seasons in existence since the amalgamation of the Hollymount and Carramore clubs in 2011 when claiming the Mayo Intermediate Football Championship title. Hollymount was founded back in 1954, while Carramore was re-formed in 1975. Hollymount have won back-to-back county senior titles (1990-1) and their last senior championship came in 1994. Carramore's greatest achievement came in 1982 when they beat Glenamoy in the county junior final on a unique scoreline of 0-4 to 0-0. They also won an O’Mara Cup in 1985 – ironically, defeating Hollymount in the final.

== Promoted to SFC from IFC in 2015 ==
- Hollymount-Carramore – (Intermediate Champions)

== Relegated from SFC to IFC in 2015 ==
- Shrule-Glencorrib (loser of relegation final)

== Group stage ==
All 16 teams enter the competition at this stage. The top 2 teams in each group go into the quarter-finals while the bottom team of each group will enter a Relegation Playoff. For all group matches the home team is named first.

=== Group A ===
Team	Pld	W	L	D	PF	PA	PD	Pts
Breaffy	3	3	0	0	53	31	+22	6
Garrymore	3	1	1	1	41	44	-3	3
Davitts	3	1	2	0	41	44	-3	2
Claremorris	3	0	2	1	44	60	-16	1

Round 1

- Breaffy 1-9, 0-6 Garrymore, 14/5/2016,
- Claremorris 1-8, 3-8 Davitts, 14/5/2016,

Round 2

- Garrymore 1-13, 1-10 Davitts, 25/6/2016,
- Breaffy 3-15, 1-11 Claremorris, 26/6/2016,

Round 3

- Davitts 0-11, 2-11 Breaffy, 8/10/2016,
- Claremorris 3-10, 2-13 Garrymore, 8/10/2016,

=== Group B ===
Team	Pld	W	L	D	PF	PA	PD	Pts
Ballintubber	3	2	1	0	50	27	+23	4
Aghamore	3	2	1	0	48	33	+15	4
Charlestown Sarsfields	3	1	2	0	31	62	-31	2
Hollymount-Carramore	3	1	2	0	36	43	-7	2

Round 1

- Ballintubber 3-3, 0-11 Hollymount-Carramore, 14/5/2016,
- Aghamore 3-15, 0-8 Charlestown Sarsfields, 14/5/2016,

Round 2

- Ballintubber 2-17, 1-4 Charlestown Sarsfields, 25/6/2016,
- Aghamore 1-13, 0-9 Hollymount-Carramore, 25/6/2016,

Round 3

- Charlestown Sarsfields 1-13, 2-9 Hollymount-Carramore, 8/10/2016,
- Aghamore 0-8, 2-10 Ballintubber, 8/10/2016,

=== Group C ===
Team	Pld	W	L	D	PF	PA	PD	Pts
Castlebar Mitchels	3	3	0	0	65	29	+36	6
Crossmolina Deel Rovers	3	2	1	0	47	42	+5	4
Ballina Stephenites	3	1	2	0	42	36	+6	2
Ballinrobe	3	0	3	0	30	77	-47	0

Round 1

- Castlebar Mitchels 3-13, 0-9 Crossmolina Deel Rovers, 14/5/2016,
- Ballina Stephenites 4-12, 1-5 Ballinrobe, 15/5/2016,

Round 2

- Castlebar Mitchels 5-10, 0-9 Ballinrobe, 25/6/2016,
- Crossmolina Deel Rovers 1-7, 0-7 Ballina Stephenites, 25/6/2016,

Round 3

- Crossmolina Deel Rovers 4-16, 2-7 Ballinrobe, 8/10/2016,
- Castlebar Mitchels 1-15, 0-11 Ballina Stephenites, 8/10/2016,

=== Group D ===
Team	Pld	W	L	D	PF	PA	PD	Pts
Kncokmore	3	2	0	1	45	25	+20	5
Ballaghaderreen	3	2	1	0	54	42	+12	4
Kiltane	3	1	1	1	38	42	-4	3
Ballyhaunis	3	0	3	0	26	54	-28	0

Round 1

- Ballaghaderreen 1-12, 0-12 Ballyhaunis, 14/5/2016,
- Kiltane 1-4, 0-7 Knockmore, 14/5/2016,

Round 2

- Ballaghaderreen 5-11, 2-9 Kiltane, 26/6/2016,
- Knockmore 2-17, 0-5 Ballyhaunis, 26/6/2016,

Round 3

- Knockmore 1-12, 2-7 Ballaghaderreen, 8/10/2016,
- Kiltane 2-10, 0-9 Ballyhaunis, 8/10/2016,

== Knock-Out Stage ==
=== Last Eight ===
Quarter-Finals		Semi-Finals		Final
Breaffy	1-14
Crossmolina Deel Rovers	0-11	Breaffy	1-7
Kncokmore	0-10	Kncokmore	0-12
Aghamore	0-8			Kncokmore	0-10
Castlebar Mitchels	3-13			Castlebar Mitchels	3-13
Ballaghaderreen	1-13	Castlebar Mitchels	1-11
Ballintubber	6-14	Ballintubber	1-5
Garrymore	1-8

=== Quarter-finals ===
15 October 2016; 3:00 pm	Breaffy	1-14 – 0-11	Crossmolina	McHale Park, Castlebar; Referee: John Glavey (Aghamore); Man of the Match: Patrick Loftus
15 October 2016; 3:00 pm	Liam Irwin 0-4 (0-3f), Tommy O'Reilly 1-0, Rob Hennelly (0-1f, 1 '45) and Michael Jennings 0-2, Aidan O'Shea, Rory Martyn, Conor O'Shea, Kevin Curry, Robbie Fadden, James Minogue 0-1 each		Fionan Duffy 0-5 (0-4f), Cathal Carolan and Conor Loftus 0-2 each, Chris Myles and David Howley 0-1 each	McHale Park, Castlebar; Referee: John Glavey (Aghamore); Man of the Match: Patrick Loftus

15 October 2016; 4:30 pm	Knockmore	0-10 – 0-8	Aghamore	McHale Park; Referee: Kevin Connelly (Hollymount/Carramore); Man of the Match: Colm Reape
15 October 2016; 4:30 pm	Colm Reape 0-4, Kieran Langan 0-2, Kevin McLoughlin, Keith Ruttledge, Peter Naughton, Francie O'Neill 0-1 each		Alan Freeman 0-6 (0-5f), Conor Lyons and Darren Duffy 0-1 each	McHale Park; Referee: Kevin Connelly (Hollymount/Carramore); Man of the Match: Colm Reape

16 October 2016; 2:00 pm	Castlebar Mitchels	3-13 – 1-13	Ballaghaderreen	McHale Park; Referee: Liam Devenney (Ballina); Man of the Match: Cian Costello
16 October 2016; 2:00 pm	Neil Douglas 0-6 (0-1f, 1 '45), Cian Costello 1-2, Eoghan O'Reilly and Barry Moran 1-0, James Durcan and David Stenson (0-2f) 0-2 each, Niall Lydon 0-1		Barry Regan 0-8 (0-6f), Shairoze Akram 1-1, Andy Moran 0-2, Gavin Conway and Thomas Carmody 0-1 each	McHale Park; Referee: Liam Devenney (Ballina); Man of the Match: Cian Costello

16 October 2016; 3:30 pm	Ballintubber	6-14 – 1-8	Garrymore	McHale Park; Referee: Vincent Neary (Bonniconlon); Man of the Match: Cillian O'Connor
16 October 2016; 3:30 pm	Cillian O'Connor 4-4 (0-2f), Michael Plunkett and Jason Gibbons 1-1 each, Brian Walsh 0-3, Conor Finnerty 0-2, Gary Loftus, Damien McGing, Alan Plunkett 0-1 each		Jimmy Killeen 0-4, Micheal Connolly 1-0, Kieran Cunningham, Trevor Nally, Caolan Crowe, Brian Walsh 0-1 each	McHale Park; Referee: Vincent Neary (Bonniconlon); Man of the Match: Cillian O'Connor

=== Semi-finals ===
23 October 2016; 12:00pm Semi-Final	Knockmore	0-12 – 1-7	Breaffy	McHale Park; Referee: G McMahon (Davitts); Man of the Match: Sean Ruttledge
23 October 2016; 12:00pm Semi-Final	Peter Naughton 0-5 (0-3f), Kevin McLoughlin, Keith Ruttledge, Kieran Langan, 0-2 each, Sean Ruttledge 0-1	Report	Liam Irwin 0-3f, Tommy O’Reilly 1-0, Robbie Hennelly 0-2 (0-1f, 1 '45), Kevin Curry and Gareth Dunne 0-1 each	McHale Park; Referee: G McMahon (Davitts); Man of the Match: Sean Ruttledge

23 October 2016; 2:00pm Semi-Final	Castlebar Mitchels	1-11 – 1-5	Ballintubber	McHale Park; Referee: Liam Devenney (Ballina); Man of the Match: Neil Douglas
23 October 2016; 2:00pm Semi-Final	Neil Douglas 0-8 (0-5f), David Stenson 1-0, Donie Newcombe, Ray O’Malley, Cian Costello 0-1 each	Report	Cillian O’Connor 0-5f, Danny Geraghty 1-0	McHale Park; Referee: Liam Devenney (Ballina); Man of the Match: Neil Douglas

=== Final ===
29 October 2016; 7:00 pm Final	Castlebar Mitchels	3-13 – 0-10	Knockmore	McHale Park; Attendance: 5,375; Referee: J. Glavey; Man of the Match: Patrick Durcan
29 October 2016; 7:00 pm Final	Neil Douglas (1-6, 4f), Patrick Durcan (1-3), Barry Moran (1-0), Aidan Walsh (0-2) and David Stenson (0-2, 1f)	Report	Peter Naughton (0-5, 4f), Keith Rutledge (0-2, 1f), Colm Reape (0-1), Kevin McLoughlin (0-1), Sean Rutledge (0-1)	McHale Park; Attendance: 5,375; Referee: J. Glavey; Man of the Match: Patrick Durcan

== Relegation Playoffs ==
=== Relegation Semi-Finals ===
- Claremorris 0-11, 2-5 Ballyhaunis, Charlestown, 16/10/2016,
- Hollymount/Carramore 0-15, 1-6 Ballinrobe, Ballindine, 16/10/2016,
- Claremorris 1-15, 1-7 Ballyhaunis, Connacht COE, 4/12/2016, (Replay)

=== Relegation Final ===
- Ballinrobe 1-11, 0-6 Ballyhaunis, Ballindine, 11/12/2016,

== Championship statistics ==
=== Miscellaneous ===
- Hollymount-Carramore made their debut in the senior grade.
