= 2020 Mayo Senior Football Championship =

Gaelic football tournament

Tournament details
- County: Mayo
- Year: 2020
- Trophy: Paddy Moclair Cup
- Sponsor: Connacht Gold
- Teams: 16
- Defending champions: Ballintubber

Winners
- Champions: Knockmore
- Manager: ???
- Captain: ???
- Qualify for: Connacht Club SFC

Runners-up
- Runners-up: Breaffy
- Captain: ???

Promotion/Relegation
- Relegated team(s): ???

The 2020 Mayo Senior Football Championship was the 119th edition of the Mayo GAA's premier gaelic football tournament for senior clubs in County Mayo, Ireland. Sixteen teams competed with the winners not going on to represent Mayo in the Connacht Senior Club Football Championship, due to the latter competition's cancellation. In spite of the COVID-19 pandemic, the format for the championship was not altered. The championship started with a group stage and progressed to a knock out stage. The winners received the Paddy Moclair Cup.

The Neale made their first ever appearance in the top-flight of Mayo club football, having claimed the 2019 Mayo I.F.C. title with a final victory over Ballyhaunis.

Ballintubber were the defending champions for the second year running after they defeated Ballaghaderreen in the 2019 S.F.C. final.

The draw for the group stages of the championship were made on 9 March 2020 with the games commencing on 31 July 2020.

== Team changes ==
The following teams have changed division since the 2019 championship season.

=== To S.F.C. ===
Promoted from 2019 I.F.C.

- The Neale - (Intermediate Champions)

=== From S.F.C. ===
Relegated to 2020 I.F.C.

- Hollymount-Carramore

== Clubs ==
The 2020 Championship was contested by 16 clubs: 4 of them from South Mayo, 4 from North Mayo, 4 from West Mayo, 4 from East Mayo.

Team	Team colours	Position in 2018
Aghamore		
Ballaghaderreen		
Ballina Stephenites		
Ballintubber		Champions
Belmullet		I.F.C. Champions
Breaffy		Finalists
Castlebar Mitchels		
Charlestown Sarsfields		
Claremorris		
Davitts		
Garrymore		
Kiltane		
Knockmore		
Moy Davitts		
The Neale		
Westport		

== Group stage ==
All 16 teams entered the competition at this stage. The top 2 teams in each group qualified for the quarter-finals while the bottom team of each group entered a Relegation Playoff. All teams played one home match, one away match and one match at a neutral venue. In the event of two teams finishing on the same points total, placings were decided by head-to-head record between the teams, then by scoring difference.

=== Group A ===
Team	Pld	W	L	D	PF	PA	PD	Pts
Ballaghaderreen	3	3	0	0	55	37	+18	6
The Neale	3	1	1	1	40	46	-6	3
Belmullet	3	1	1	1	36	43	-7	3
Garrymore	3	0	0	3	33	38	-5	0

Round 1

1 August 2020	Ballaghaderreen	3-11 - 2-4	Belmullet	Belmullet

1 August 2020	The Neale	1-9 - 0-11	Garrymore	Cong

Round 2

8 August 2020	Garrymore	0-13 - 2-8	Ballaghaderreen

9 August 2020	Belmullet	2-8 - 0-14	The Neale

Round 3

28 August 2020	Ballaghaderreen	3-12 - 1-11	The Neale	Ballindine

28 August 2020	Belmullet	2-6 - 1-6	Garrymore	Ballina

=== Group B ===
Team	Pld	W	L	D	PF	PA	PD	Pts
Ballintubber	3	2	1	0	54	22	+32	5
Aghamore	3	2	1	0	41	31	+10	5
Davitts	3	0	1	2	26	46	-20	1
Moy Davitts	3	0	1	2	31	53	-22	1

Round 1

1 August 2020	Davitts	0-9 - 0-9	Moy Davitts	Ballindine

1 August 2020	Ballintubber	0-7 - 1-4	Aghamore	Clogher

Round 2

8 August 2020	Aghamore	0-18 - 0-12	Davitts

8 August 2020	Ballintubber	3-19 - 1-7	Moy Davitts

Round 3

29 August 2020	Aghamore	1-13 - 1-9	Moy Davitts	Ballaghaderreen

29 August 2020	Ballintubber	1-16 - 0-5	Davitts	Ballinrobe

=== Group C ===
Team	Pld	W	L	D	PF	PA	PD	Pts
Ballina Stephenites	3	3	0	0	54	33	+21	6
Knockmore	3	2	0	1	58	35	+23	4
Kiltane	3	1	0	2	40	63	-23	2
Claremorris	3	0	0	3	39	60	-21	0

Round 1

2 August 2020	Knockmore	0-19 - 0-10	Claremorris	Knockmore

2 August 2020	Ballina Stephenites	3-11 - 1-5	Kiltane	Ballina

Round 2

9 August 2020	Claremorris	1-10 - 1-18	Ballina Stephenites

9 August 2020	Knockmore	3-18 - 0-12	Kiltane

Round 3

29 August 2020	Ballina Stephenites	1-10 - 0-12	Knockmore	Crossmolina

29 August 2020	Kiltane	3-11 - 1-13	Claremorris	Knockmore

=== Group D ===
Team	Pld	W	L	D	PF	PA	PD	Pts
Westport	3	2	1	0	48	40	+8	5
Breaffy	3	2	0	1	52	50	+2	4
Castlebar Mitchels	3	1	0	2	38	43	-5	2
Charlestown Sarsfields	3	0	1	2	47	52	-5	1

Round 1

1 August 2020	Castlebar Mitchels	1-13 - 1-9	Charlestown Sarsfields	Charlestown

2 August 2020	Westport	2-11 - 0-16	Breaffy	Breaffy

Round 2

8 August 2020	Westport	2-10 - 2-10	Charlestown Sarsfields

9 August 2020	Breaffy	0-16 - 0-14	Castlebar Mitchels

Round 3

29 August 2020	Breaffy	0-20 - 2-13	Charlestown Sarsfields	Claremorris

29 August 2020	Westport	0-15 - 0-8	Castlebar Mitchels	Breaffy

== Knock-Out Stage ==
Quarter-finals
Ballintubber
Knockmore
Ballina Stephenites
Aghamore
Westport
The Neale
Ballaghaderreen
Breaffy

Semi-finals
Knockmore
???
???
Breaffy

Final
Knockmore	1-12
Breaffy	0-13

=== Quarter-finals ===
29 August 2020 Quarter-Final	???	-vs-	???	???
				Referee: ???

29 August 2020 Quarter-Final	???	-vs-	???	???
				Referee: ???

29 August 2020 Quarter-Final	???	-vs-	???	???
				Referee: ???

29 August 2020 Quarter-Final	???	-vs-	???	???
				Referee: ???

=== Semi-finals ===
5 September 2020 Semi-Final	???	-vs-	???	???
				Referee: ???

5 September 2020 Semi-Final	???	-vs-	???	???
				Referee: ???

=== Final ===
19 September 2020; Final	Knockmore	1-12 - 0-13	Breaffy	MacHale Park; Referee: J Glavey
19 September 2020; Final	D McHale 1-4, P Naughton 0-3, K Ruttledge 0-2, A Orme 0-2, K Langan 0-1		T O'Reilly 0-5, C O'Shea 0-3, M Ruane 0-2, A O'Shea 0-1, R Hennelly 0-1, C Flynn 0-1	MacHale Park; Referee: J Glavey
