= 2018 Mayo Senior Football Championship =

Tournament details
- County: Mayo
- Year: 2018
- Trophy: Paddy Moclair Cup
- Sponsor: Connacht Gold
- Date: 7 April - 20 October 2018
- Teams: 16
- Defending champions: Castlebar Mitchels

Winners
- Champions: Ballintubber (4th win)
- Manager: Kevin Johnson
- Captain: Damien Coleman
- Qualify for: Connacht Club SFC

Runners-up
- Runners-up: Breaffy
- Manager: Peter Ford & Shane Conway

Promotion/Relegation
- Promoted team(s): Belmullet
- Relegated team(s): Crossmolina Deel Rovers

Other
- Matches played: 35
- Top Scorer: Cillian O'Connor

The 2018 Mayo Senior Football Championship was the 117th edition of the Mayo GAA's premier gaelic football tournament for senior clubs in County Mayo, Ireland. Sixteen teams competed with the winners going on to represent Mayo in the Connacht Senior Club Football Championship. The championship started with a group stage and progressed to a knock out stage. The winners received the Paddy Moclair Cup.

Moy Davitts returned to the top-flight for the first time since their relegation in 2010, having claimed the 2017 Intermediate Championship title with a replay victory over Kiltimagh.

Castlebar Mitchels were the defending champions for the third season running after they defeated Ballintubber in the 2017 final. Ballintubber dethroned Mitchels in the semi-final following a replay, before defeating Breaffy in the final to win their 4th title. Crossmolina, 2001 All-Ireland champions, were relegated to the intermediate grade for the 2019 season.

== Team changes ==
As 2017 Intermediate Champions, Moy Davitts were promoted to the Senior Championship for 2018. They took the place of Ballinrobe, who were relegated from the Senior Championship at the end of the 2017 season.

== Clubs ==
The 2018 Championship was contested by 16 clubs: 4 of them from South Mayo, 4 from North Mayo, 4 from West Mayo, 4 from East Mayo.

Team	Team colours	Position in 2017
Aghamore		Relegation Semi-Finalists
Ballaghaderreen		Non-Qualifier
Ballina Stephenites		Quarter-finalists
Ballintubber		Finalists
Breaffy		Quarter-finalists
Castlebar Mitchels		champions
Charlestown Sarsfields		Non-Qualifier
Claremorris		Semi-Finalists
Crossmolina Deel Rovers		Non-Qualifier
Davitts		Relegation Finalists
Garrymore		Semi-Finalists
Hollymount-Carramore		Quarter-Finalists
Kiltane		Non-Qualifier
Knockmore		Quarter-Finalists
Moy Davitts		I.F.C. Champions
Westport		Relegation Semi-Finalists

== Group stage ==
All 16 teams entered the competition at this stage. The top 2 teams in each group qualified for the quarter-finals while the bottom team of each group entered a Relegation Playoff. All teams played one home match, one away match and one match at a neutral venue. In the event of two teams finishing on the same points total, placings were decided by head-to-head record between the teams, then by scoring difference.

=== Group 1 ===
Team	Pld	W	L	D	PF	PA	PD	Pts
Castlebar Mitchels	3	3	0	0	70	33	+37	6
Ballaghaderreen	3	2	1	0	41	45	-4	4
Ballina Stephenites	3	0	2	1	34	50	-16	1
Aghamore	3	0	2	1	33	50	-17	1

Round 1

7 April 2018
18:00
Round 1

Castlebar Mitchels	2-18 (24) – (9) 1-06	Ballina Stephenites
(HT: 0-08 – 0-05)
Gls: N. Douglas 1 (pen), D. Kirby 1 Pts: D. Stenson 5 (4f), N. Douglas 4 (1'45), D. Kirby 2, F. Durcan 1, J. Durcan 1, D. Newcombe 1, J. Maughan 1, S. Conlon 1, R. O'Malley 1, A. O'Boyle 1		Gls: K. Newell 1 Pts: E. Regan 4 (4f), K. Newell 1, C. Sweeney 1

Josie Munnelly Park, Castlebar
Referee: P. Lydon (Kiltimagh)

8 April 2018
14:00
Round 1

Ballaghaderreen	1-11 (14) – (10) 0-10	Aghamore
(HT: 1-07 – 0-01)
Gls: G. Conway 1 Pts: B. Regan 7 (7f), A. Moran 2, R. Lynch 1, P. Kelly 1		Pts: A. Freeman 3 (3f), F. Boland 2, R. Egan 1, J. Lyons 1, C. Byrne 1 (f), J. Kelly 1, K. Feeney 1

Ballaghaderreen, Ballaghaderreen
Referee: J. Henry (Castlebar Mitchels)

Round 2

25 August 2018
18:00
Round 2

Aghamore	0-12 (12) – (25) 3-16	Castlebar Mitchels
(HT: 0-09 – 1-10)
Pts: A. Freeman 5 (2f, 1pen), R. Egan 2 (2f), I. Carty 2, C. Harrison 1, D. Duffy 1, F. Boland 1		Gls: B. Moran 1, D. Kirby 1, S. Conlon 1 Pts: N. Douglas 5 (2f, 1'45), B. Moran 2, D. Stenson 2 (1f), D. Newcombe 2, D. Kirby 1, S. Hopkins 1, A. Walsh 1, P. Durcan 1, D. Vaughan 1

Aghamore, Aghamore
Referee: K. Connelly (Hollymount-Carramore)

26 August 2018
14:00
Round 2

Ballina Stephenites	1-11 (14) – (15) 2-09	Ballaghaderreen
(HT: 0-06 – 1-04)
Gls: E. Regan 1 Pts: K. Tighe 3, E. Regan 2 (2f), S. Leonard 1, J. Moylette 1, C. McStay 1, C. Treacy 1 (f), K. Newell 1, M. Murray 1		Gls: L. O'Grady 2 Pts: B. Regan 4 (4f), A. Moran 2, L. O'Grady 1, C. Doohan 1, R. Lynch 1

James Stephens Park, Ballina
Referee: G. McMahon (Davitts)

Round 3

8 September 2018
18:00
Round 3

Castlebar Mitchels	3-12 (21) – (12) 0-12	Ballaghaderreen
(HT: 1-08 – 0-07)
Gls: N. Douglas 2, P. Durcan 1 Pts: N. Douglas 4 (2f, 1'45), P. Durcan 1, J. Durcan 1, D. Kirby 1, D. Newcombe 1, A. Walsh 1, S. Hopkins 1, J. Maughan 1, D. Stenson 1		Pts: B. Regan 3 (1f), R. Lynch 2, C. Doohan 2, S. Akram 1, D. Kelly 1, K. O'Donnell 1, P. Kelly 1, K. Callaghan 1

Fr. O'Hara Park, Charlestown
Referee: L. Higgins (Ballina Stephenites)

9 September 2018
16:00
Round 3

Ballina Stephenites	1-08 (11) – (11) 0-11	Aghamore
(HT: 0-07 – 0-04)
Gls: C. Sweeney 1 Pts: M. Murray 2, K. Tighe 2, S. Leonard 2, T. Doherty 1, K. Newell 1		Pts: R. Egan 4 (4f), A. Freeman 3, D. Duffy 1, F. Boland 1, D. Kenny 1, S. Tighe 1

Sraith Garbh, Foxford
Referee: K. Corcoran (Islandeady)

=== Group 2 ===
Team	Pld	W	L	D	PF	PA	PD	Pts
Garrymore	3	3	0	0	58	45	+13	6
Moy Davitts	3	1	1	1	54	43	11	3
Charlestown Sarsfields	3	1	2	0	37	55	-18	2
Knockmore	3	0	2	1	45	51	-6	1

Round 1

7 April 2018
19:00
Round 1

Charlestown	1-12 (15) – (12) 1-09	Knockmore
(HT: 0-05 – 1-05)
Gls: P. Lenehan 1 Pts: J. Reilly 6 (3f), P. Lenehan 1, A. Woods 1, J. McBrien 1, P. Ward 1, C. Maye 1, T. Meehan 1		Gls: S. Ruttledge 1 Pts: A. Loftus 3, P. Naughton 2, R. Casey 1, C. Reape 1 (f), K. Langan 1, F. O'Neill 1

Connacht Center of Excellence, Bekan (Note: Pitch unplayable at Fr. O'Hara Memorial Park, Charlestown.)
Referee: C. Collins (Lacken)

8 April 2018
15:00
Round 1

Moy Davitts	1-12 (15) – (18) 2-12	Garrymore
(HT: 0-05 – 1-07)
Gls: B. Heneghan 1 Pts: B. Reape 4 (2f), A. Jordan 3, P. Ruane 1, A. Bourke 1, B. Heneghan 1, S. Kelly 1, O. McHugh 1		Gls: J. Killeen 1, M. Tierney 1 Pts: J. Killeen 3, M. Tierney 2 (1f), P. Deely 2, S. Nally 2, T. Nally 1, C. Slattery 1, G. Golden 1

Foxford, Foxford
Referee: V. Neary (Bonniconlon)

Round 2

25 August 2018
16:00
Round 2

Garrymore	2-14 (20) – (13) 0-13	Charlestown
(HT: 0-07 – 0-05)
Gls: P. Deely 1, J. Killeen 1 Pts: M. Tierney 4 (1f), C. Slattery 3, S. Nally 2, G. Golden 2, P. Deely 2 (1f), D. Dolan 1		Pts: C. Maye 3 (3f), J. Reilly 3 (1f), P. Golden 2, E. Browne 2, T. Meehan 1, P. Towey 1, R. Duffy 1

Garrymore, Garrymore
Referee: J. Henry (Castlebar Mitchels)

25 August 2018
16:00
Round 2

Knockmore	1-13 (16) – (16) 1-13	Moy Davitts
(HT: 1-08 – 0-04)
Gls: K. Langan 1 Pts: A. Orme 4 (3f), P. Naughton 3 (2f), K. Ruttledge 2, D. McHale 2, K. Langan 1, O. McNamara 1		Gls: C. Byrne 1 (pen); Pts: B. Reape 9 (5f), C. Byrne 1, P. Ruane 1, A. Jordan 1, A. Bourke 1

St. Joseph's Park, Knockmore
Referee: R. Gurren (Aghamore)

Round 3

9 September 2018
13:00
Round 3

Knockmore	0-17 (17) – (20) 2-14	Garrymore
(HT: 0-08 – 2-06)
Pts: P. Naughton 10 (6f), K. Langan 2, O. McNamara 1, D. McHale 1, K. McLoughlin 1, C. Reape 1 ('45), S. Ruttledge 1		Gls: T. Nally 1, G. Golden 1 Pts: P. Deely 4, M. Tierney 4 (2f), C. Slattery 2, M. Connolly 1, S. Nally 1, C. Crowe 1, J. King 1

MacHale Park, Castlebar
Referee: J. Glavey (Aghamore)

9 September 2018
13:00
Round 3

Charlestown	1-06 (9) – (23) 1-20	Moy Davitts
(HT: 1-05 – 1-07)
Gls: G. O'Donnell 1 Pts: J. Reilly 3, D. Caffrey 1, P. Towey 1, P. Goldrick 1		Gls: A. Bourke 1 Pts: B. Reape 8 (3f), A. Jordan 5 (1f), A. Bourke 3, C. Byrne 3, L. Byrne 1

Gilmartin Park, Kiltimagh
Referee: L. Devenney (Ballina Stephenites)

=== Group 3 ===
Team	Pld	W	L	D	PF	PA	PD	Pts
Westport	3	3	0	0	51	37	+14	6
Claremorris	3	2	1	0	46	36	+10	4
Hollymount-Carramore	3	0	2	1	41	47	-6	1
Crossmolina Deel Rovers	3	0	2	1	36	54	-18	1

Round 1

7 April 2018
18:00
Round 1

Hollymount Carramore	0-09 (9) – (13) 2-7	Claremorris
(HT: 0-03 – 1-05)
Pts: D. Coen 5 (3f), I. Costello 2, K. Costello 1, K. Feerick 1		Gls: D. Gannon 1, K. Costello 1 (o.g.); Pts: J. Shaughnessy 3 (2f), J. McCormack 2, M. Higgins 2

Canon Gibbons Park, Claremorris (Note: Pitch unplayable at Hollymount.)
Referee: L. Devenney (Ballina Stephenites)

8 April 2018
14:00
Round 1

Crossmolina Deel Rovers	0-08 (8) – (18) 2-12	Westport
(HT: 1-07 – 0-03)
Pts: C. Loftus 4 (4f), F. Duffy 3 (3f), J. Flynn 1		Gls: L. Cawley 1, F. McDonagh 1 Pts: L .Cawley 4 (2f), F. McDonagh 2 (2f), O. McLaughlin 2, C. Moran 1, P. Keegan 1, S. Scott 1, P. Lambert 1

St. Tiernan's Park, Crossmolina
Referee: K. Connelly (Hollymount-Carramore)

Round 2

25 August 2018
16:00
Round 2

Westport	1-14 (17) – (15) 0-15	Hollymount Carramore
(HT: 1-07 – 0-11)
Gls: K. Kilkelly 1 (pen); Pts: K. Kilkelly 9 (5f), P. Lambert 2, C. Higgins 1, O. McLaughlin 1, C. Moran 1		Pts: D. Coen 10 (5f), C. Keane 3, K. Feerick 2

St. Patrick's Park, Westport
Referee: V. Neary (Bonniconlon)

25 August 2018
18:00
Round 2

Claremorris	2-13 (19) – (11) 0-11	Crossmolina Deel Rovers
(HT: 2-04 – 0-04)
Gls: J. Shaughnessy 1 (f), S. McGreal 1 Pts: J. Shaughnessy 6 (3f, 1'45), J. Stretton 3, S. McGreal 1, J. Hutton 1, A. Butler 1, C. Diskin 1		Pts: F. Duffy 8 (6f), C. Carolan 2, C. Loftus 1

Canon Gibbons Park, Claremorris
Referee: P. Lydon (Kiltimagh)

Round 3

8 September 2018
17:00
Round 3

Hollymount Carramore	1-14 (17) – (17) 0-17	Crossmolina Deel Rovers
(HT: 1-09 – 0-12)
Gls: C. Heneghan 1 Pts: D. Coen 7 (5f), C. Keane 3, K. Feerick 2, S. Coen 1, R. Molloy 1		Pts: F. Duffy 7 (3f) B. Benson 3, P. Gardiner 2, M. McAndrew 1, C. Carolan 1, M. Loftus 1, C. Loftus 1 ('45), JP Mulhern 1

Islandeady, Islandeady
Referee: R. Gurren (Aghamore)

9 September 2018
14:00
Round 3

Claremorris	2-08 (14) – (16) 1-13	Westport
(HT: 1-03 – 0-09)
Gls: C. Diskin 1, S. McGreal 1 Pts: J. Shaughnessy 5 (4f, 1'45), C. Diskin 1, S. McGreal 1, J. Hutton 1 (f)		Gls: O. McLaughlin 1 Pts: K. Kilkelly 7 (6f), C. Moran 4, F. McDonagh 1, O. McLaughlin 1

Flanagan Park, Ballinrobe
Referee: J. Walker (Chill Chomain)

=== Group 4 ===
Team	Pld	W	L	D	PF	PA	PD	Pts
Ballintubber	3	2	0	1	53	30	+23	5
Breaffy	3	2	0	1	48	33	+15	5
Kiltane	3	1	2	0	43	56	-13	2
Davitts	3	0	3	0	31	56	-25	0

Round 1

7 April 2018
16:00
Round 1

Davitts	1-09 (12) – (16) 1-13	Ballintubber
(HT: 0-05 – 0-05)
Gls: J. Ronayne 1 Pts: J. Ronayne 4 (2f), A. Peters 2, A. McTigue 2, E. Ronane 1		Gls: A. Plunkett 1 Pts: A. Dillon 3 (1f), M. Plunkett 2, B. Walsh 2, S. O'Malley 2, A. Plunkett 1, R. O'Connor 1, S. Finnerty 1, D. O'Connor 1

Davitt Park, Ballindine
Referee: F. Flynn

8 April 2018
14:00
Round 1

Breaffy	1-15 (18) – (15) 1-12	Kiltane
(HT: 1-08 – 0-07)
Gls: C. O'Shea 1 Pts: C. O'Shea 5 (4f), R. Hennelly 5 (4f, 1'45), G. Walsh 3, G. Jennings 1, S. McDermott 1		Gls: T. Conroy 1 Pts: J. Reilly 6 (6f), M. Sweeney 2, B. McAndrew 1, J. Healy 1, D. Carey 1, ('45), A. Carrabine 1 (f)

Breaffy, Breaffy
Referee: R. Gurren (Aghamore)

Round 2

25 August 2018
16:00
Round 2

Kiltane	3-14 (23) – (14) 2-08	Davitts
(HT: 2-07 – 1-04)
Gls: A. Carrabine 1, U. Corrigan 1, M. Gallagher 1 Pts: A. Carrabine 5 (3f), M. Conroy 2, T. Conroy 1, U. Corrigan 2 (f), M. Sweeney 2, B. McAndrew 1, S. Gallagher 1		Gls: L. Kearns 2 (1 pen); Pts: E. Ronane 4 (f), R. McNamara 2 (1f), C. Boyle 1, L. Kearns 1

Bangor Erris, Bangor Erris
Referee: J. Glavey (Aghamore)

25 August 2018
18:00
Round 2

Ballintubber	1-10 (13) – (13) 0-13	Breaffy
(HT: 1-05 – 0-05)
Gls: C. O'Connor 1 Pts: C. O'Connor 4 (4f), D. Coleman 2, A. Plunkett 2, C. Gavin 1, D. O'Connor 1		Pts: C. O'Shea 4 (2f), R. Hennelly 2 (2f), M. Ruane 2, D. Cannon 1, J. Minogue 1, G. Walsh 1, G. Dunne 1, T. O'Reilly 1

Ray Prendergast Memorial Park, Clogher
Referee: L. Devenney (Ballina Stephenites)

Round 3

8 September 2018
17:30
Round 3

Kiltane	0-05 (5) – (24) 2-18	Ballintubber
(HT: 0-02 – 1-08)
Pts: J. Reilly 3 (2f), U. Corrigan 1, M. Sweeney 1 (f)		Gls: A. Plunkett 1, C. Gavin 1 Pts: C. O'Connor 9 (6f), A. Plunkett 5, S. O'Malley 3, R. O'Connor 1

MacHale Park, Castlebar
Referee: P. Lydon (Kiltimagh)

8 September 2018
17:30
Round 3

Breaffy	0-17 (17) – (5) 0-05	Davitts
(HT: 0-11 – 0-02)
Pts: C. O'Shea 4 (3f), T. O'Reilly 3 (3f), R. Hennelly 3 (3f), A. O'Shea 3, M. Ruane 1, M. Hall 1, R. Fadden 1, D. Morrin 1		Pts: E. Ronane 2 (2f), J. Ronayne 2 (1f), R. McNamara 1

Canon Gibbons Park, Claremorris
Referee: M. Daly (Ballyhaunis)

== Knock-Out Stage ==
The top two teams in each group progressed to the knock-out stage. Group winners were drawn against group runners-up, and all games were played at neutral venues.

Quarter-Finals		Semi-Finals		Final
Ballintubber	2-17
Moy Davitts	0-11	Ballintubber	0-16
Castlebar Mitchels	1-20	Castlebar Mitchels	0-15
Claremorris	2-09			Ballintubber	0-12
Westport	0-10			Breaffy	1-08
Breaffy	0-11	Breaffy	1-13
Garrymore	0-18	Ballaghaderren	1-10
Ballaghaderren	3-11

=== Quarter-finals ===
22 September 2018
18:00
Quarter Final

Report

Westport	0-10 (10) – (11) 0-11	Breaffy
(HT: 0-05 – 0-09)
Pts: C. Moran 3, K. Kilkelly 3(3f), F. McDonagh 2, L. Cawley 1, P. O'Malley 1(f)		Pts: C. O'Shea 5 (3f), R. Hennelly 4 (4f), A. O'Shea 1, S McDermott 1

MacHale Park, Castlebar
Referee: L. Devenney (Ballina Stephenites)

22 September 2018
19:30
Quarter Final

Ballintubber	2-17 (23) – (11) 0-11	Moy Davitts
(HT: 2-10 – 0-08)
Gls: A. Plunkett 1, A. Dillon 1 Pts: C. O'Connor 7 (6f), A. Plunkett 3, J. Gibbons 3, P. O'Connor 2, S. O'Malley 2		Pts: B. Reape 4 (1f), L. Byrne 2, J. Mulderrig 1, P. Ruane 1, A. Jordan 1, S. Kelly 1, C. Byrne 1 (f)

MacHale Park, Castlebar
Referee: K. Connelly (Hollymount-Carramore)

23 September 2018
13:00
Quarter Final

Castlebar Mitchels	1-20 (23) – (15) 2-09	Claremorris
(HT: 1-12 – 1-00)
Gls: A. Walsh 1 Pts: N. Douglas 6, P. Durcan 4, J. Durcan 3, D. Stenson 3 (1f), D. Kirby 2, D. Newcombe 1, A. Walsh 1		Gls: J. Shaughnessy 1 (pen), C. Diskin 1 Pts: J. Shaughnessy 4 (3f), C. Diskin 2 (1f), P. Barry 1, D. O'Reilly 1, D. Egan 1

MacHale Park, Castlebar
Referee: J. Walker (Chill Chomain)

23 September 2018
14:30
Quarter Final

Garrymore	0-18 (18) – (20) 3-11	Ballaghaderreen
(HT: 0-07 – 2-04)
Pts: P. Deely 8 (5f), M. Tierney 4 (3f), G. Golden 2, C. Crowe 1, B. Cunningham 1, S. Nally 1, C. Slattery 1		Gls: D. Kelly 2, C. Hanley 1 Pts: B. Regan 4 (1f), R. Lynch 3, A. Moran 2, K. Callaghan 1, D. Kelly 1

MacHale Park, Castlebar
Referee: V. Neary (Bonniconlon)

=== Semi-finals ===
6 October 2018
18:00
Semi Final

Ballaghaderreen	1-10 (13) – (16) 1-13	Breaffy
(HT: 0-06 – 1-07)
Gls: K. Callaghan 1 Pts: B. Regan 4 (3f), A. Moran 3, C. Doohan 1, L. O'Grady 1, R. Lynch 1		Gls: G. Dunne 1 Pts: T. O'Reilly 5 (2f), C. O'Shea 4 (3f), G. Dunne 1, M. Ruane 1, S. O'Shea 1, A. O'Shea 1

MacHale Park, Castlebar
Referee: K. Connolly (Hollymount-Carramore)

6 October 2018
19:30
Semi Final

Ballintubber	1-12 (15) – (15) 1-12 (a.e.t.)	Castlebar Mitchels
(HT: 1-03 – 0-05) (FT: 1-09 – 1-09)
Gls: M. Plunkett 1 Pts: C. O'Connor 8 (7f), C. Gavin 2 (1f), M. Kelly 1, J. Finnerty 1		Gls: R. O'Malley 1 Pts: D. Stenson 5 (3f), N. Douglas 4 (1 '45), B. Moran 2, A. O'Boyle 1

MacHale Park, Castlebar
Referee: L. Devenney (Ballina Stephenites)

13 October 2018
19:00
Semi Final Replay

Ballintubber	0-16 (16) – (15) 0-15 (a.e.t.)	Castlebar Mitchels
(HT: 0-07 – 0-05) (FT: 0-12 – 0-12)
Pts: C. O'Connor 7 (6f), D. O'Connor 2, A. Dillon 2, G. Loftus 1, J. Gibbons 1, S. O'Malley 1, B. Walsh 1, J. Geraghty 1		Pts: N. Douglas 5 (3f), D. Stenson 3 (3f), S. Hopkins 2, J, Durcan 2, B. Moran 1, P. Durcan 1, A. O'Boyle 1

MacHale Park, Castlebar
Referee: J. Glavey (Aghamore)

=== Final ===
20 October 2018
20:00
Final

Report

Ballintubber	0-12 (12) – (11) 1-08	Breaffy
(HT: 0-06 – 1-02)
Pts: C. O'Connor 7 (6f), S. O'Malley 2, D. Coleman 1, A. Dillon 1, D. O'Connor 1		Gls: P. Dravins 1 Pts: C. O'Shea 3 (3f), T O'Reilly 2, R. Hennelly 1 ('45), G. Dunne 1, R. Fadden 1

MacHale Park, Castlebar
Referee: V. Neary (Bonniconlon)
Attendance: 8,311

== Relegation Playoffs ==
The four teams who finished bottom of their groups entered the relegation play-offs, with the two losers of the semi-finals meeting in the relegation play-off final. All games were played at neutral venues. Crossmolina, as losers of the final, were relegated to the Intermediate Championship for 2019.

=== Relegation Semi-Finals ===
22 September 2018
16:00
Relegation Semi-Final

Aghamore	2-11 (17) – (11) 1-08	Davitts
(HT: 0-06 – 0-06)
Gls: C. Harrison 1, I. Carty 1 Pts: R. Egan 7 (3f), F. Boland 2, S. Tigue 1, A. Freeman 1		Gls: C. Boyle 1 Pts: L. Kearns 2, J. Ronayne 2, C. Hennelly 1, C. Boyle 1, R. McNamara 1, S. Treacy 1

Ballyhaunis, Ballyhaunis
Referee: V. Neary (Bonniconlon)

23 September 2018
13:00
Relegation Semi-Final

Knockmore	1-12 (15) – (7) 0-07	Crossmolina Deel Rovers
(HT: 1-05 – 0-02)
Gls: D. McHale 1 Pts: D. McHale 3, A. Orme 3, C. Reape 2 (1f), K. Ruttledge 2, K. McLoughlin 1, S. Ruttledge 1		Pts: F. Duffy 6 (6f), C. Loftus 1

James Stephen's Park, Ballina
Referee: D. Corcoran (Islandeady)

=== Relegation Final ===
6 October 2018
16:30
Relegation Final

Davitts	0-17 (17) – (16) 1-13	Crossmolina Deel Rovers
(HT: 0-06 – 1-08)
Pts: E. Ronane 5, C. Hennelly 3 (1f), R. McNamara 3 (2f), J. Ronayne 2 (1f), M. Conroy 2, S. Treacy 1, C. Boyle 1		Gls: S. Duffy 1 Pts: F. Duffy 9 (7f), C. Carolan 3, S. Duffy 1

Fr. O'Hara Memorial Park, Charlestown
Referee: J. Glavey (Aghamore)

== Championship statistics ==
=== Miscellaneous ===
- Moy Davitts returned to the top-flight for the first time since 2010
- Crossmolina Deel Rovers are relegated.
