= Mayo Intermediate Football Championship =

Annual Gaelic football competition

- Irish: Craobh Idirmheánach Peile; Co. Muigheo
- Founded: 1965 –
- Trophy: Sweeney Cup
- Title holders: Crossmolina Deel Rovers
- Most titles: ? (? titles)
- Sponsors: Egan Jewellers

The Mayo Intermediate Football Championship is an annual Gaelic football competition contested by mid-tier (17–32) Mayo GAA clubs.

Ballyhaunis are the title holders (2022) defeating Kilmeena in the Final.

== Honours ==
The winning club competes in the Connacht Intermediate Club Football Championship. They often do well there, with the likes of Westport (2016), Hollymount Carraroe (2015), Kiltane (2013) and Charlestown Sarsfields (2012) among the clubs from Mayo to win at least one Connacht Championship after winning the Mayo Intermediate Football Championship.

The winning club can, in turn, go on to play in the All-Ireland Intermediate Club Football Championship. In 2017, Westport, who counted among their players the reigning All Stars Footballer of the Year Lee Keegan, became the first club from Mayo to win an All-Ireland Intermediate Football Championship after winning the Connacht and Mayo Intermediate Football Championships.

The winning club is promoted to the Mayo Senior Football Championship.

The trophy presented to the winners is the Sweeney Cup.

== History ==
Each year, the final takes place in McHale Park, Castlebar.

The most successful team to date are ? who have won on ? occasions.

The competition has taken place each year since 1965. The inaugural winners of the Mayo IFC that year were Garrymore.

In the 2020 final, Balla defeated Kiltimagh in a shock result.

== List of finals ==
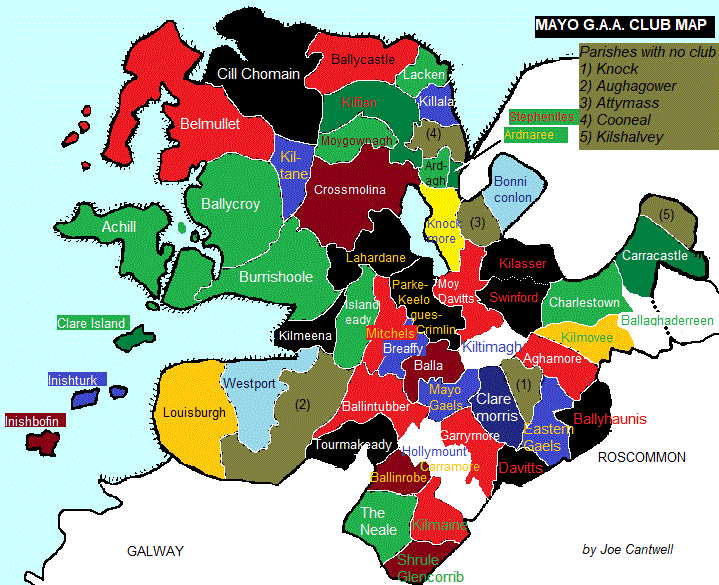
Mayo GAA clubs

Location of County Mayo in Ireland

Year	Winner	Opponent
2026	Davitts 0-23	Ballinrobe 0-17
2025	Kilmeena	Bohola Moy Davitts
2024	Crossmolina Deel Rovers 1:13	Moy Davitts 0:12
2023	Kilmeena 1-11	Ballinrobe 1-09
2022	Ballyhaunis 0-13	Kilmeena 0-10
2021	Mayo Gaels 1-11	Ballyhaunis 1-09
2020	Balla 1-08	Kiltimagh 0-07
2019	The Neale 1–12	Ballyhaunis 1-11
2018	Belmullet	Burrishoole
2017	Moy Davitts 2-10	Kiltimagh 2-09
2016	Westport 0-10	Kiltimagh 0-04
2015	Hollymount Carramore 0-11	The Neale 0–07
2014	Ballyhaunis	Hollymount Carramore
2013	Kiltane	Kilmaine
2012	Charlestown Sarsfields	
2011	Davitts	Burrishoole
2010	Tuar Mhic Éadaigh 0-11	Burrishoole 0-08
2009	Westport 2-07	Tuar Mhic Éadaigh 0-12
2008	Aghamore 3-05	Kilmaine 1–10
2007	Ballintubber 0-09	Kiltimagh 0-08
2006	Tuar Mhic Éadaigh 1-11	Parke-Keelogues-Crimlin 1-10
2005	Castlebar Mitchels	
2004	Breaffy	Ballaghaderreen
2003	Louisburgh	Ballintubber
2002	Ballinrobe	
2001	Kiltimagh	
2000	Ballinrobe	Ballaghaderreen
1999	Swinford	Ballintubber
1998	Mayo Gaels 0-09	Ballinrobe 0-08
1997	Bonniconlon	Ballintubber
1996	Moy Davitts	
1995	Louisburgh	
1994	Swinford 0–12	Kilmaine 1–07
1993	Charlestown Sarsfields	
1992	Burrishoole	
1991	Kiltimagh	
1990	Ballintubber	
1989	Hollymount Carramore	
1988	Ballyhaunis	
1987	Swinford	Ballintubber
1986	Bonniconlon	Achill
1985		
1984	Mayo Gaels 2-07	Bonniconlon 0-04
1983	Parke	
1982	Tuar Mhic Éadaigh 1-08	Burrishoole 1-06
1981	Davitts 0-08	Tuar Mhic Éadaigh 1-04
1980	Crossmolina Deel Rovers 1-07	Davitts 0-06
1979	Ballinrobe	Crossmolina Deel Rovers
1978	Kiltimagh	Davitts
1977		
1976	Ballintubber	Davitts
1975	Islandeady	Ballinrobe
1974	Béal an Mhuirthead	Crossmolina Deel Rovers
1973	Kiltane	Ardnaree
1972		
1971	Ballaghaderreen	Westport
1970		
1969	Garrymore 1-06	Ballintubber 0-08
1968		Ballintubber
1967	Ballyhaunis	Ballintubber
1966		
1965	Garrymore	Ballintubber

== Wins listed by club ==
- Ballintubber (3): 1976, 1990, 2007
- Swinford GAA (3): 1987, 1994, 1999
- Mayo Gaels (3): 1984, 1998, 2021
- Tuar Mhic Éadaigh (3): 1982, 2006, 2010
- Garrymore (2): 1965, 1969
- Bonniconlon (2): 1986, 1997
- Kiltane (2): 1973, 2013
- Belmullet (2): 1974, 2018
- Westport (2): 2009, 2016
- Crossmolina Deel Rovers (2): 1980, 2024
- Kilmeena (2): 2023, 2025
- Louisburgh (2): 1995,2003
- Davitts (1): 2011
- Hollymount Carramore (1): 2015
- Balla (1): 2020
