= Mayo Senior Hurling Championship =

Annual hurling competition

- Current season or competition: 2026 Mayo Senior Hurling Championship
- Code: Hurling
- Founded: 1923
- Region: Mayo (GAA)
- Trophy: TJ Tyrrell Cup
- No. of teams: 4 clubs 1 division
- Title holders: Tooreen (36th title)
- Most titles: Tooreen (36 titles)
- Sponsors: Connacht Gold

The Mayo Senior Hurling Championship is an annual hurling competition contested since 1923 by the top Mayo GAA clubs.

In its current format, the Mayo Senior Championship begins in mid-summer. The 4 participating teams play each other in a round-robin system. The group winner and the runners-up proceed to the final match. The other two teams play the Senior B final. The winner of the Mayo Senior Championship qualifies for the Connacht Intermediate Club Hurling Championship.

Tooreen are the title holders, defeating Ballyhaunis by 2-29 to 0–20 in the 2026 final.

== History ==
=== Team participation ===
As of 2026, the competition is contested by teams representing Ballyhaunis, Castlebar, St. Ciaran's and Tooreen. St Ciaran's are a divisional team made up of Intermediate and Junior club teams.

== Teams ==
=== 2026 Teams ===
The four teams competing in the 2026 Mayo Senior Hurling Championship were:

Team	Location	Colours	Club/division	Club's division side	Position in 2026	In championship since	Championship titles	Last championship title
Ballyhaunis	Ballyhaunis	Red and black	Club	St Ciarans	Runners-up	?	13	2020
Castlebar Mitchels	Castlebar	Red and gold	Club	St Ciarans	Champions (Mayo SBHC)	?	2	1955
St Ciarans	County Mayo	Black and white	Division	N / A	Runners-up (Mayo SBHC)	2023	0	—
Tooreen	Tooreen	Blue and white	Club	St Ciarans	Champions	?	36	2026

=== Clubs eligible for divisional teams ===
Division	Clubs eligible for divisional team
St Ciarans	Ballina Stephenites, Beal Atha Bhearraigh, Caiseal Gaels, Claremorris, Gaeltacht Iorrais, Moytura, Westport

=== Clubs and grades ===
As of 2026 the following teams compete at senior and junior level:

Senior
Ballyhaunis
Castlebar Mitchels
St Ciarans
Tooreen
Junior
Beal Atha Bhearraigh
Caiseal Gaels
Tooreen B
Gaeltacht Iorrais
Ballina Stephenites
Claremorris
Moytura
Westport
Castlebar Mitchels B

Location of County Mayo in Ireland

== Qualification for subsequent competitions ==
At the end of the championship, the winning team qualify to the subsequent Connacht Intermediate Club Hurling Championship, the winner of which progresses to the All-Ireland Intermediate Club Hurling Championship.

== Trophy ==
The trophy presented to the winners is the TJ Tyrrell Cup.

== Roll of honor ==
=== By club ===
#	Club	Titles	Runners-up	Championship wins	Championship runner-up
1	Tooreen	36	19	1966, 1972, 1974, 1975, 1978, 1979, 1980, 1981, 1982, 1983, 1984, 1985, 1986, 1987, 1989, 1990, 1991, 1992, 1993, 1994, 1995, 1997, 1998, 1999, 2000, 2003, 2013, 2017, 2018, 2019, 2021, 2022, 2023, 2024, 2025, 2026	1963, 1968, 1971, 1973, 1976, 1977, 1988, 1996, 2001, 2002, 2004, 2008, 2009, 2010, 2012, 2014, 2015, 2016, 2020
2	Ballyhaunis	13	14	2002, 2004, 2005, 2006, 2008, 2009, 2010, 2011, 2012, 2014, 2015, 2016, 2020	1997, 1999, 2000, 2003, 2007, 2013, 2017, 2017, 2021, 2022, 2023, 2024, 2025, 2026
3	Westport	4	7	1962, 1964, 1969, 1970	1927, 1965, 1987, 1992, 1993, 2005, 2011
3	Ballaghaderreen	4	0	1923, 1924, 1950, 1953	—
5	Ballinrobe	3	5	1973, 1976, 1977	1972, 1975, 1978, 1979, 1980
5	Ballina	3	0	1958, 1959, 1996	—
7	Castlebar Mitchels	2	11	1952, 1955	1956, 1974, 1981, 1982, 1983, 1984, 1985, 1994, 1995, 1998, 2019
7	Claremorris	2	1	1968, 1971	1957
7	Cong	2	1	1965, 1967	1966
7	Manulla	2	0	1960, 1961	—
7	Belmullet	2	0	1957, 2001	—
12	North Mayo	1	4	1988	1986, 1989, 1990, 1991
12	Moy Slashers	1	1	1963	1964
12	Ballina James Stephens	1	1	2007	2006
12	Charlestown	1	0	1951	—
12	Swinford	1	0	1956	—
12	Ballyheane	1	0	1927	—
18	Tooreen/Ballyhaunis	0	1	—	1958

=== Notes ===
- Runners-up unknown: 1923–1924, 1950–1953, 1955, 1959–1962, 1967, 1969–1970

== List of finals ==
=== Legend ===
- Gold – Connacht intermediate club champions
- Silver – Connacht intermediate club runners-up

=== List of Mayo SHC finals ===
Year	Winners		Runners-up	
Year	Club	Score	Club	Score
2026	Tooreen	2-29	Ballyhaunis	0-20
2025	Tooreen	2-17	Ballyhaunis	0-21
2024	Tooreen	1-21 (A.E.T)	Ballyhaunis	0-22
2023	Tooreen	0-13	Ballyhaunis	0-08
2022	Tooreen	1-14	Ballyhaunis	2-05
2021	Tooreen	0-15	Ballyhaunis	1-11
2020	Ballyhaunis	1-15	Tooreen	1-12
2019	Tooreen	0-18	Castlebar	1-13
2018	Tooreen	0-15	Ballyhaunis	0-11
2017	Tooreen	2-10	Ballyhaunis	0-06
2016	Ballyhaunis	2-12, 2-13 (R)	Tooreen	1-15, 1-13 (R)
2015	Ballyhaunis	0-20	Tooreen	1-14
2014	Ballyhaunis	1-12	Tooreen	1-10
2013	Tooreen	4-10	Ballyhaunis	1-06
2012	Ballyhaunis	1-14	Tooreen	0-16
2011	Ballyhaunis	1-19	Westport	1-06
2010	Ballyhaunis	0-14	Tooreen	0-11
2009	Ballyhaunis	2-09	Tooreen	1-07
2008	Ballyhaunis	0-15	Tooreen	2-07
2007	Ballina	0-14	Ballyhaunis	1-10
2006	Ballyhaunis	1-09	Ballina	1-04
2005	Ballyhaunis	3-10	Westport	0-07
2004	Ballyhaunis	2-11	Tooreen	0-08
2003	Tooreen	1-08	Ballyhaunis	0-07
2002	Ballyhaunis	4-10	Tooreen	3-08
2001 (After Replay)	Belmullet	3-14	Tooreen	1-11
2000	Tooreen	3-05	Ballyhaunis	0-09
1999	Tooreen	1-11	Ballyhaunis	1-09
1998	Tooreen	1-12	Castlebar	0-07
1997	Tooreen	2-14	Ballyhaunis	1-06
1996	Ballina	2-07	Tooreen	1-09
1995	Tooreen	3-11	Castlebar	2-06
1994	Tooreen	3-18	Castlebar	0-04
1993	Tooreen	3-17	Westport	0-09
1992	Tooreen	1-12	Westport	0-08
1991	Tooreen	2-11	North Mayo	1-01
1990	Tooreen	2-19	North Mayo	2-04
1989	Tooreen	3-11	North Mayo	0-09
1988	North Mayo	2-05	Tooreen	1-07
1987	Tooreen	2-15	Westport	3-02
1986	Tooreen	5-21	North Mayo	3-07
1985	Tooreen	2-17	Castlebar	1-05
1984	Tooreen	2-13	Castlebar	1-03
1983	Tooreen	0-18	Castlebar	1-06
1982	Tooreen	1-10	Castlebar	2-05
1981	Tooreen	2-10	Castlebar	2-05
1980	Tooreen	2-12	Ballinrobe	0-02
1979	Tooreen	2-11	Ballinrobe	2-07
1978	Tooreen	2-12	Ballinrobe	3-00
1977	Ballinrobe	3-06	Tooreen	1-09
1976	Ballinrobe	1-08	Tooreen	1-05
1975	Tooreen	2-06	Ballinrobe	0-06
1974	Tooreen	2-08	Castlebar	2-03
1973 (After Replay)	Ballinrobe	2-06	Tooreen	2-03
1972	Tooreen	3-09	Ballinrobe	2-03
1971	Claremorris	6-6	Tooreen	1-4
1970	Westport	Awarded	Ballyheane GAA	
1969	Westport		Tooreen	
1968	Claremorris	3-7	Tooreen	0-10
1967	Cong		Claremorris	
1966	Tooreen	3-05	Cong	1-03
1965	Cong	8-9	Ballyheane GAA	1-3
1964	Westport	10-8	Moy Slashers	6-3
1963	Moy Slashers	2-04	Tooreen	1-02
1962	Westport	0-13	Moy Slashers	3-2
1961	Manulla	0-10	Ballaghaderreen	0-4
1960	Manulla	5-1	Belmullet	1-0
1959	Westport		Ballina Stephenites	
1958	Belmullet	5-2	Castlebar	1-2
1957	Ballina	4-06	Manulla	0-00
1956	Swinford	3-09	Castlebar	3-05
1955	Castlebar Mitchels	4-8	Ballaghaderreen	1-4
1954	Castlebar	6-4	Ballaghaderreen	3-1
1953	Ballaghaderreen			
1952	Charlestown			
1951	Castlebar			
1950	Ballaghaderreen	7-11	Westport	5-2
1949	Castlebar			
1948	Ballina			
1947	Westport			
1946	Ballina		Castlebar	
1945	Castlebar	1-6	Ballaghaderreen	2-0
1944	Westport			
1943	Westport	6-7	Castlebar	1-1
1942	Westport			
1941	Westport	2-1	Castlebar	2-0
1940	Westport			
1939	Westport			
1938	Westport			
1937	Ballyheane			
1936	Ballyheane			
1935	Ballyheane			
1934	Westport			
1933	Ballina	5-0	Ballyheane	4-1
1932	Ballina			
1931	Ballina			
1930	Ballina	6-0	Ballyheane	2-4
1929(After Replay)	Ballyheane	6-3	Ballina	3-0
1928	Westport	6-0	Ballyheane	0-0
1927 (After Replay)	Ballyheane	3-1	Westport	1-2
1926	Westport Army			
1925	Ballina			
1924	Ballaghaderreen			
1923	Ballaghaderreen			
1919	Swinford			
1918	Swinford	3-2	Balla	3-0
1917	Swinford		Balla	
1916	Swinford			
1910	Castlebar			
1907	Ballina	7-6	Ballyhaunis	0-0
1906	Castlebar Dr Hydes	1-13	Ballyhaunis	1-2
1905	Castlebar Dr Hydes			
1904	Castlebar Dr Hydes		Ballina	
1902	Castlebar Gaels	8-9	Westport	0-0

== See also ==
- Mayo Senior Football Championship
