= Johnny Carey (Gaelic footballer) =

Irish Gaelic footballer and police officer

Personal information
- Born: 1945 (age 80–81) Bangor Erris, County Mayo, Ireland
- Occupation: Garda Síochána

Sport
- Sport: Gaelic football
- Position: Right full-back
Clubs
- Years: Club
- Belmullet; Kiltane; Tuam Stars; Dunmore McHales; Roscommon Gaels
Inter-county
- Years: County
- 1965–1973: Mayo
Inter-county titles
- Connacht titles: 2
- NFL: 1
- All Stars: 1

Johnny Carey is a former GAA All Star Gaelic footballer and Garda Superintendent from Bangor Erris, County Mayo, Ireland. He won 2 Connacht Senior Football Championships, in 1967 and 1969, with the Mayo county team and a National Football League medal in 1970. In 1971, he was named at right full back on the inaugural team at the GAA All Stars Awards. He was also manager of the senior Mayo football team between 1977 and 1980.

== Playing career ==
=== Club ===
Owing to his career with the Gardaí, Carey was a member of several clubs over the course of his playing career. With his first club, Belmullet, he won a county minor medal in 1962, which led to a call-up to the Mayo county minor team in 1962 and 1963. He joined Kiltane when it was formed in 1964, and won a north Mayo championship in 1965. He was based in Tuam between 1966 and 1973, where he played with Tuam Stars before returning to Kiltane in 1973 to win a Mayo Intermediate Football Championship medal. Over the course of the rest of his club career, Carey played for Dunmore McHales and Roscommon Gaels.

=== Inter-county ===
Carey played for the senior Mayo county team between 1965 and 1973. He was part of the team that won the Connacht Senior Football Championship in both 1967 and 1969, and captained the team to a National Football League in 1970. He was also part of the Connacht Railway Cup team that won the competition in 1969.

Following his retirement from the inter-county team in 1973, he returned to manage them between 1977 and 1980.

== Personal life ==
Carey was a member of the Garda, rising to the rank of Chief [Superintendent (police) before his retirement in 2005. The following year, he was named by Shell as an advisor to the Corrib gas project. He is married to Mary Ann and is father of five (Michelle, Jacqueline, John Brendan, Siobhan and Brian).

Preceded by ?	Mayo Senior Football Manager; 1977–1980	Succeeded by ?
