= Ballycroy GAA =

Gaelic games club in County Mayo, Ireland

- CLG Baile Cruaich
- Founded: 1889
- County: Mayo
- Colours: Green and White
- Grounds: Tallagh

Playing kits
Standard colours

Senior Club Championships
| | All Ireland | Connacht champions | Mayo champions |
|---|---|---|---|
| Football: | - | - | 0 |

Ballycroy GAA (Irish: CLG Baile Cruaich) is a Gaelic Athletic Association club located in Ballycroy, in northern County Mayo, Ireland. The club is focused exclusively on Gaelic football and was founded in 1889. In the 1960s, Ballycroy played alongside Kiltane GAA in the club St Pat's. As of 2023, Ballycroy and Kiltane were also combining to field under-age teams.

The club won its first trophy, the Erris Cup, in 1956. Ballycroy's first appearance in a men's county final was a division 5 league final in 2019, on the 130th anniversary of the club, when they beat Louisburgh after extra time.
