= 1991 Mayo Senior Football Championship =

Tournament details
- County: Mayo
- Year: 1991

Winners
- Champions: Hollymount (2nd win)
- Manager: Mike Jennings
- Captain: Tom Connolly

Promotion/Relegation
- Promoted team(s): Balla, Kiltimagh
- Relegated team(s): Swinford, Ballintubber

This is a round-up of the 1991 Mayo Senior Football Championship. Hollymount, first-time winners the previous year, retained the Moclair Cup by defeating Westport in the final, with the latter making their first final appearance since 1942.

== First round ==
Game	Date	Venue	Team A	Score	Team B	Score
Mayo SFC; First Round	30 June	Shrule	Shrule	1-8	Castlebar Mitchels	1-8
Mayo SFC; First Round	30 June	Charlestown	Charlestown Sarsfields	2-11	Swinford	0-7
Mayo SFC; First Round	30 June	Hollymount	Hollymount	2-18	Ballintubber	1-7
Mayo SFC; First Round	30 June	Crossmolina	Crossmolina Deel Rovers	1-12	Davitts	0-8
Mayo SFC; First Round	30 June	Ballina	Ballina Stephenites	3-15	Claremorris	1-12
Mayo SFC; First Round	30 June	Bangor Erris	Knockmore	1-6	Kiltane	0-5
Mayo SFC; First Round	30 June	Ballyhaunis	Ballyhaunis	0-13	Garrymore	1-7
Mayo SFC; First Round Replay	21 July	Castlebar	Castlebar Mitchels	3-11	Shrule	0-6

== Quarter finals ==
Game	Date	Venue	Team A	Score	Team B	Score
Mayo SFC; Quarter Final	4 August	Castlebar	Castlebar Mitchels	1-8	Ballyhaunis	0-7
Mayo SFC; Quarter Final	4 August	Hollymount	Hollymount	4-5	Knockmore	2-7
Mayo SFC; Quarter Final	4 August	Ballina	Ballina Stephenites	2-4	Crossmolina Deel Rovers	0-9
Mayo SFC; Quarter Final	4 August	Westport	Westport	2-8	Charlestown Sarsfields	1-6

== Semi-finals ==
Game	Date	Venue	Team A	Score	Team B	Score
Mayo SFC; Semi-Final	25 August	Crossmolina	Wesport	2-9	Ballina Stephenites	0-8
Mayo SFC; Semi-Final	25 August	Ballinrobe	Hollymount	0-11	Castlebar Mitchels	0-8

== Mayo Senior Football Championship Final ==
Hollymount	1-6 - 1-2 (final score after 60 minutes)	Westport
Team: D. Healy; O. Kelly; M. Morris (1-0 o.g.); M. Connelly; N. Connelly; P.J. Fallon; A. Jennings; F. Fahy; P. Ruane; J. Jennings (0-2); N. Stagg (0-2); G. Stagg (0-2); P. Walsh; P.J. Coen; T. Connolly (1-0)(Capt) Substitutes: F. Noone; K. Stagg	Half-time: 1-3 - 0-2 Competition: Mayo Senior Football Championship (Final) Date: 22 September 1991 Venue: McHale Park, Castlebar Referee: Sean McÉil (Knockmore)	Team: M. Higgins (Capt); P. Moran; C. Lambert; S. Calvey; N. Baynes; T. Tierney (0-1); P. Walsh; C. Dever; M. Brennan; K. Geraghty; M. Connolly; L. Gannon; S. Moran; J. O'Grady (0-1); P. Kelly Substitutes: J. Fahy; P. Heraty
