= 1987 Mayo Senior Football Championship =

Tournament details
- County: Mayo
- Year: 1987

Winners
- Champions: Ballina Stephenites (31st win)
- Captain: Kevin McStay

Promotion/Relegation
- Promoted team(s): Swinford
- Relegated team(s): Belmullet

This is a round-up of the 1987 Mayo Senior Football Championship. Ballina Stephenites regained the Moclair Cup after defeating old rivals and holders Castlebar Mitchels in the final.

== Preliminary round ==
Game	Date	Venue	Team A	Score	Team B	Score
Mayo SFC; Preliminary Round	28 June	Claremorris	Davitts	0-12	Garrymore	0-6
Mayo SFC; Preliminary Round	28 June	Castlebar	Knockmore	2-7	Ballinrobe	1-5

== First round ==
Game	Date	Venue	Team A	Score	Team B	Score
Mayo SFC; First Round	19 July	Castlebar	Claremorris	1-10	Kiltane	3-3
Mayo SFC; First Round	19 July	Castlebar	Ballina Stephenites	2-7	Davitts	0-5
Mayo SFC; First Round	19 July	Knockmore	Crossmolina Deel Rovers	1-8	Mayo Gaels	1-3
Mayo SFC; First Round	19 July	Ballina	Kilmaine	3-9	Lacken	0-11
Mayo SFC; First Round	19 July	Ballina	Castlebar Mitchels	1-20	Belmullet	1-4
Mayo SFC; First Round	19 July	Charlestown	Ballaghaderreen	0-12	Bonniconlon	0-4
Mayo SFC; First Round	19 July	Ballyhaunis	Aghamore	1-6	Kiltimagh	0-4
Mayo SFC; First Round	19 July	Aghamore	Knockmore	0-5	Hollymount	0-4

== Quarter finals ==
Game	Date	Venue	Team A	Score	Team B	Score
Mayo SFC; Quarter Final	2 August	Claremorris	Castlebar Mitchels	0-14	Claremorris	0-7
Mayo SFC; Quarter Final	2 August	Claremorris	Aghamore	3-10	Kilmaine	0-5
Mayo SFC; Quarter Final	2 August	Ballina	Knockmore	2-10	Crossmolina Deel Rovers	0-7
Mayo SFC; Quarter Final	2 August	Charlestown	Ballina Stephenites	0-9	Ballaghaderreen	0-4

== Semi-finals ==
Game	Date	Venue	Team A	Score	Team B	Score
Mayo SFC; Semi-Final	30 August	Charlestown	Castlebar Mitchels	2-11	Knockmore	1-11
Mayo SFC; Semi-Final	30 August	Charlestown	Ballina Stephenites	3-6	Aghamore	0-8

== Mayo Senior Football Championship Final ==
Ballina Stephenites	1-8 - 2-2 (final score after 60 minutes)	Castlebar Mitchels
Team: I. Heffernan; E. Glancy; Gerry Leonard; P. Warde; J. Galvin; E. Melvin; T. Lyons; Liam McHale (1-1); J. Browne (0-1); Kevin McStay (0-1); B. Molloy; M. McGrath (0-3); P. McStay (0-1); K. Rowe; T. Tighe (0-1) Substitutes: E. Gilvarry	Half-time: Competition: Mayo Senior Football Championship (Final) Date: 27 September 1987 Venue: James Stephens Park, Ballina Referee: Willie Kelly (Kilmeena)	Team: P. Gavin; M. Flynn; R. Mee; J. Brennan; I. Reidy; M. Feeney; K. Murphy; H. Gavin; M. Walsh; M. Killeen; M. Carney (0-2); F. Joyce; B. Kilkelly (1-0); D. O'Reilly; T. Reilly (1-0) Substitutes: T. O'Malley; M. Mullaghy
