= Patsy Flannelly =

Irish Gaelic footballer

Personal information
- Native name: Pádraig Ó Flannaile (Irish)
- Nickname: Patsy
- Born: 7 November 1909 Castlebar, County Mayo, Ireland
- Died: 14 October 1939 (aged 29) Castlebar, County Mayo, Ireland
- Occupation: Butcher
- Height: 6 ft 0 in (183 cm)

Sport
- Sport: Gaelic football
- Position: Midfield
Club
- Years: Club
- 1927–1939: Castlebar Mitchels
Club titles
- Mayo titles: 4
Inter-county
- Years: County
- 1932–1939: Mayo
Inter-county titles
- Connacht titles: 5
- All-Irelands: 1
- NFL: 6

Patrick Martin Flannelly (7 November 1909 – 14 October 1939) was an Irish Gaelic footballer who played as a midfielder at senior level for the Mayo county team.

Flannelly joined the team during the 1932 championship and was a regular member of the starting fifteen until his death following the conclusion of the 1939 championship. During that time he won one All-Ireland medal, five Connacht medals and six National League medals.

Flannelly experienced a successful club career with Castlebar Mitchels, winning four county championship medals.
