= 1990 Mayo Senior Football Championship =

Tournament details
- County: Mayo
- Year: 1990

Winners
- Champions: Hollymount (1st win)
- Manager: Mike Jennings
- Captain: Padraig Heneghan

Promotion/Relegation
- Promoted team(s): Ballintubber, Charlestown
- Relegated team(s): Ballaghaderreen, Mayo Gaels

This is a round-up of the 1990 Mayo Senior Football Championship. Hollymount, Intermediate champions of the previous year, claimed their first Senior Championship in what was their first final appearance. Holders Knockmore fell in the decider after a wasteful shooting display, eventually losing by a point.

== First round ==
Game	Date	Venue	Team A	Score	Team B	Score
Mayo SFC; First Round	10 June	Shrule	Shrule	1-12	Mayo Gaels	0-9
Mayo SFC; First Round	10 June	Swinford	Swinford	1-13	Garrymore	1-6
Mayo SFC; First Round	10 June	Hollymount	Hollymount	2-10	Ballyhaunis	1-8
Mayo SFC; First Round	10 June	Crossmolina	Crossmolina Deel Rovers	3-11	Kiltane	1-3
Mayo SFC; First Round	10 June	Castlebar	Castlebar Mitchels	0-14	Ballina Stephenites	1-11
Mayo SFC; First Round	10 June	Ballindine	Davitts	0-7	Ballaghaderreen	1-4
Mayo SFC; First Round Replay	8 July	Ballina	Castlebar Mitchels	2-12	Ballina Stephenites	2-9
Mayo SFC; First Round Replay	8 July	Ballaghaderreen	Davitts	1-10	Ballaghaderreen	1-2

== Quarter finals ==
Game	Date	Venue	Team A	Score	Team B	Score
Mayo SFC; Quarter Final	29 July	Shrule	Castlebar Mitchels	2-9	Shrule	0-11
Mayo SFC; Quarter Final	29 July	Swinford	Hollymount	0-11	Swinford	0-5
Mayo SFC; Quarter Final	29 July	Crossmolina	Crossmolina Deel Rovers	3-9	Claremorris	0-7
Mayo SFC; Quarter Final	29 July	Ballindine	Knockmore	2-7	Davitts	1-6

== Semi-finals ==
Game	Date	Venue	Team A	Score	Team B	Score
Mayo SFC; Semi-Final	26 August	Ballina	Knockmore	2-8	Crossmolina Deel Rovers	2-5
Mayo SFC; Semi-Final	26 August	Ballinrobe	Hollymount	0-11	Castlebar Mitchels	0-6

== Mayo Senior Football Championship Final ==
Hollymount	0-8 - 0-7 (final score after 60 minutes)	Knockmore
Team: D. Healy; M. Joyce; M. Morris; O. Kelly; F. Noone; P.J. Fallon; N. Connelly; P. Ruane; A. Jennings; G. Stagg; J. Jennings (0-5); N. Stagg; P. Walsh; P.J. Coen (0-1); T. Connolly (0-1) Substitutes: K. Stagg (0-1); M. Connelly; F. Fahy	Half-time: 0-3 0-3 Competition: Mayo Senior Football Championship (Final) Date: 30 September 1990 Venue: McHale Park, Castlebar Referee: John Harkin (Crossmolina)	Team: P. Reape; A. McHale; S. Durkan; F. Mulvihill; M. Molloy; P. Butler (0-1); T. Holmes; K. Staunton; R. Dempsey (0-1); A. Molloy; E. Maloney (0-2); T. Warde; P. Brogan (0-2); N. Reape; E. McHale (0-1) Substitutes: L. O'Neill
