= 1988 Mayo Senior Football Championship =

Tournament details
- County: Mayo
- Year: 1988

Winners
- Champions: Castlebar Mitchels (27th win)
- Captain: Brian Kilkelly

Promotion/Relegation
- Promoted team(s): Ballyhaunis
- Relegated team(s): Hollymount, Bonniconlon, Ballinrobe, Kilmaine, Kiltimagh

This is a round-up of the 1988 Mayo Senior Football Championship. Castlebar Mitchels were champions this year, having repeated their 1986 victory over Crossmolina Deel Rovers, although after a replay.

== Preliminary round ==
Game	Date	Venue	Team A	Score	Team B	Score
Mayo SFC; Preliminary Round	5 June	Castlebar	Ballina Stephenites	2-12	Swinford	2-7
Mayo SFC; Preliminary Round	5 June	Castlebar	Knockmore	2-14	Ballinrobe	0-5

== First round ==
Game	Date	Venue	Team A	Score	Team B	Score
Mayo SFC; First Round	10 July	Castlebar	Hollymount	2-7	Ballina Stephenites	0-9
Mayo SFC; First Round	10 July	Castlebar	Kiltane	0-10	Aghamore	0-7
Mayo SFC; First Round	10 July	Claremorris	Davitts	0-7	Kiltimagh	1-2
Mayo SFC; First Round	10 July	Ballina	Crossmolina Deel Rovers	0-14	Lacken	1-3
Mayo SFC; First Round	10 July	Kiltimagh	Knockmore	1-14	Kilmaine	0-6
Mayo SFC; First Round	10 July	Charlestown	Mayo Gaels	0-4	Bonniconlon	1-1
Mayo SFC; First Round	10 July	Ballyhaunis	Ballaghaderreen	0-11	Claremorris	1-4
Mayo SFC; First Round	10 July	Ballinrobe	Castlebar Mitchels	4-7	Garrymore	2-2
Mayo SFC; First Round Replay	17 July	Charlestown	Mayo Gaels	1-6	Bonniconlon	0-4

== Quarter finals ==
Game	Date	Venue	Team A	Score	Team B	Score
Mayo SFC; Quarter Final	31 July	Ballinrobe	Castlebar Mitchels	0-10	Hollymount	1-7
Mayo SFC; Quarter Final	31 July	Ballinrobe	Mayo Gaels	0-8	Davitts	1-4
Mayo SFC; Quarter Final	31 July	Ballina	Crossmolina Deel Rovers	2-9	Kiltane	0-4
Mayo SFC; Quarter Final	31 July	Charlestown	Knockmore	1-9	Ballaghaderreen	0-7
Mayo SFC; Quarter Final Replay	7 August	Ballinrobe	Castlebar Mitchels	1-9	Hollymount	0-9

== Semi-finals ==
Game	Date	Venue	Team A	Score	Team B	Score
Mayo SFC; Semi-Final	28 August	Ballina	Crossmolina Deel Rovers	0-8	Knockmore	0-3
Mayo SFC; Semi-Final	28 August	Claremorris	Castlebar Mitchels	0-6	Mayo Gaels	0-5

== Mayo Senior Football Championship Final ==
Castlebar Mitchels	2-6 - 1-9 (final score after 60 minutes)	Crossmolina Deel Rovers
Team: O. Cunningham; J. Brennan; R. Mee; L. Gavin; M. Flynn; P. Waldron; K. Murphy; M. Walsh; M. Feeney; B. Kilkelly (0-3); M. Carney (1-2); F. Joyce (1-0); H. Gavin; D. O'Reilly; K. Lydon (0-1) Substitutes: P. Gavin; T. O'Malley	Half-time: 2-2 - 1-4 Competition: Mayo Senior Football Championship (Final) Date: 25 September 1988 Venue: James Stephens Park, Ballina Referee: Willie Kelly (Kilmeena)	Team: L. Cawley; T. Gallagher; J. Timoney; P. Mangan; G. Loftus; G. Walsh (0-1); T.P. Leonard; T. Dolan; L. O'Malley; P. Flynn; T. Loftus (0-1); H. Lynn (0-6); J. Leonard (0-1); P. Loftus (1-0); B. Clinton Substitutes: J.J. McLoughlin; G. McLoughlin

== Mayo Senior Football Championship Final Replay ==
Castlebar Mitchels	1-12 - 0-9 (final score after 60 minutes)	Crossmolina Deel Rovers
Team: P. Gavin; J. Brennan; R. Mee; L. Gavin; M. Flynn; P. Waldron; K. Murphy; M. Walsh; M. Feeney; B. Kilkelly (1-4); M. Carney (0-6); F. Joyce; H. Gavin; D. O'Reilly (0-1); K. Lydon (0-1) Substitutes: T. O'Malley	Half-time: 1-4 - 0-7 Competition: Mayo Senior Football Championship (Final Replay) Date: 2 October 1988 Venue: Fr. O'Hara Park, Charlestown Referee: Willie Kelly (Kilmeena)	Team: L. Cawley; T. Gallagher; J. Timoney; P. Mangan; G. Loftus; G. Walsh; T.P. Leonard; T. Dolan (0-2); L. O'Malley; P. Flynn; T. Loftus; H. Lynn (0-4); J. Leonard (0-2); P. Loftus (0-1); B. Clinton Substitutes: J.J. McLoughlin; G. McLoughlin; E. Hiney
