= Kilmovee Shamrocks GAA =

Gaelic games club in County Mayo, Ireland

Kilmovee Shamrocks
- Seamrog Cill Mobhi
- County: Mayo
- Nickname: Shamrocks
- Colours: Green, Gold
- Grounds: Canon Henry Park

Playing kits
Standard colours

Senior Club Championships
	All Ireland	Connacht champions	Mayo champions
Football:	-	-	0

Kilmovee Shamrocks are a Gaelic Athletic Association club located in County Mayo. The club focuses primarily on the sport of Gaelic football and represents and draws players from the villages of Kilkelly and Kilmovee and the surrounding parish. The club is a member of the East Mayo Division and as of 2017 has been promoted to the Mayo Junior Championship.

Members of the Kilmovee Shamrocks ladies' have won a number of All-Ireland titles with the Mayo senior and minor teams.

== Achievements ==
- Mayo Junior B Football Championship Winners 2017

== External sources ==
- Club Website
