= Kilfian GAA =

Gaelic games club in County Mayo, Ireland

- CLG Cill Aodháin
- Founded: 1978
- County: Mayo
- Colours: Red and green
- Grounds: Ratheskin

Playing kits
Standard colours

Senior Club Championships
	All Ireland	Connacht champions	Mayo champions
Football:	-	-	0

Kilfian GAA (Irish: CLG Cill Aodháin) is a Gaelic football club in northern County Mayo. As of 2024, it was fielding teams in the North Mayo Junior B Championship.
