= 1989 Mayo Senior Football Championship =

Tournament details
- County: Mayo
- Year: 1989

Winners
- Champions: Knockmore (5th win)

Promotion/Relegation
- Promoted team(s): Hollymount, Shrule
- Relegated team(s): Lacken, Aghamore

This is a round-up of the 1989 Mayo Senior Football Championship. Though events elsewhere dominated the Mayo GAA scene in this year, when the Championship was eventually concluded Knockmore were back as champions, after a five-year wait. Their final opponents, Kiltane, were making their first ever final appearance, and missed out on success narrowly.

== First round ==
Game	Date	Venue	Team A	Score	Team B	Score
Mayo SFC; First Round	20 August	Claremorris	Aghamore	2–10	Claremorris	0–2
Mayo SFC; First Round	20 August	Ballinrobe	Swinford	2–4	Mayo Gaels	1–6
Mayo SFC; First Round	20 August	Ballyhaunis	Ballyhaunis	3–15	Lacken	1–7
Mayo SFC; First Round	20 August	Ballaghaderreen	Crossmolina Deel Rovers	1–10	Ballaghaderreen	1–4
Mayo SFC; First Round	20 August	Knockmore	Knockmore	0–10	Davitts	0–9
Mayo SFC; First Round	20 August	Garrymore	Ballina Stephenites	0–12	Garrymore	1–9
Mayo SFC; First Round Replay	24 September	Ballina	Ballina Stephenites	2–9	Garrymore	1–6

== Quarter finals ==
Game	Date	Venue	Team A	Score	Team B	Score
Mayo SFC; Quarter Final	1 October	Aghamore	Castlebar Mitchels	3–13	Aghamore	2–5
Mayo SFC; Quarter Final	1 October	Bangor Erris	Kiltane	0–9	Swinford	0–8
Mayo SFC; Quarter Final	1 October	Ballina	Crossmolina Deel Rovers	3–6	Ballyhaunis	0–5
Mayo SFC; Quarter Final	1 October	Knockmore	Knockmore	2–3	Ballina Stephenites	1–6
Mayo SFC; Quarter Final Replay	8 October	Ballina	Knockmore	0–10	Ballina Stephenites	0–4

== Semi-finals ==
Game	Date	Venue	Team A	Score	Team B	Score
Mayo SFC; Semi-Final	15 October	Ballina	Knockmore	2–8	Crossmolina Deel Rovers	0–6
Mayo SFC; Semi-Final	15 October	Ballina	Kiltane	3–9	Castlebar Mitchels	2–8

== Mayo Senior Football Championship Final ==
Knockmore	2-7 - 2-6 (final score after 60 minutes)	Kiltane
Team: Substitutes:	Half-time: Competition: Mayo Senior Football Championship (Final) Date: 29 October 1989 Venue: James Stephens Park, Ballina Referee:	Team: Substitutes:
