= Mayo Senior Football Championship =

Football championship

- Irish: Craobh Sinsear Peile Co. Muigheo
- Founded: 1888
- Trophy: Paddy Moclair Cup
- Title holders: Castlebar Mitchels (32nd title)
- Most titles: Ballina Stephenites (39 titles)
- Sponsors: Connacht Gold

The Mayo Senior Football Championship, known for sponsorship reasons as the Connacht Gold Mayo Senior Football Championship, is an annual Gaelic football competition contested by the top Mayo GAA clubs.

As of 2026, Castlebar Mitchels GAA are the title holders, having defeated Garrymore in the final.

== Honours ==
The trophy presented to the winners is the Paddy Moclair Cup, which was first presented for the 1971 final.

The winners of the Mayo Senior Championship qualify to represent their county in the Connacht Senior Club Football Championship. The winners can, in turn, go on to play in the All-Ireland Senior Club Football Championship.

== History ==
The inaugural winners of the Mayo Championship were Castlebar Mitchels who won in 1888. The most successful team to date are Ballina Stephenites who have won on 38 occasions.

== Roll of honour ==
#	Team	Wins	Years won	Last final lost
1	Ballina Stephenites	39	1889, 1904, 1905, 1906, 1907, 1908, 1909, 1910, 1911, 1912, 1913, 1914, 1915, 1916, 1918, 1920, 1924, 1925, 1926, 1927, 1928, 1929, 1933, 1935, 1938, 1940, 1943, 1947, 1955, 1966, 1985, 1987, 1998, 2003, 2004, 2007, 2023, 2024, 2025	2022
2	Castlebar Mitchels	32	1888, 1903, 1930, 1931, 1932, 1934, 1941, 1942, 1944, 1945, 1946, 1948, 1950, 1951, 1952, 1953, 1954, 1956, 1959, 1962, 1963, 1969, 1970, 1978, 1986, 1988, 1993, 2013, 2015, 2016, 2017, 2026	2014
3	Knockmore	10	1973, 1980, 1983, 1984, 1989, 1992, 1996, 1997, 2020, 2021	2024
4	Crossmolina Deel Rovers	7	1949, 1995, 1999, 2000, 2002, 2005, 2006	2003
5	Garrymore	6	1974, 1975, 1976, 1979, 1981, 1982	2026
6	Ballintubber	5	2010, 2011, 2014, 2018, 2019	2017
7	Claremorris	4	1961, 1964, 1965, 1971	1978
8	Hollymount	3	1990, 1991, 1994	—N/a
8	Ballycastle	3	1936, 1937, 1939	—N/a
8	Charlestown Sarsfields	3	1902, 2001, 2009	2008
8	Ballaghaderreen	3	1972, 2008, 2012	2019
12	East Mayo	2	1957, 1967	—N/a
12	Ballyhaunis	2	1919, 1958	1926
14	Shamrocks	1	1977	1976
14	North Mayo	1	1968	—N/a
14	West Mayo	1	1960	—N/a
14	Lacken	1	1917	1984
14	Ballina Commercials	1	1890	—N/a
14	Westport	1	2022	2025

== List of finals ==
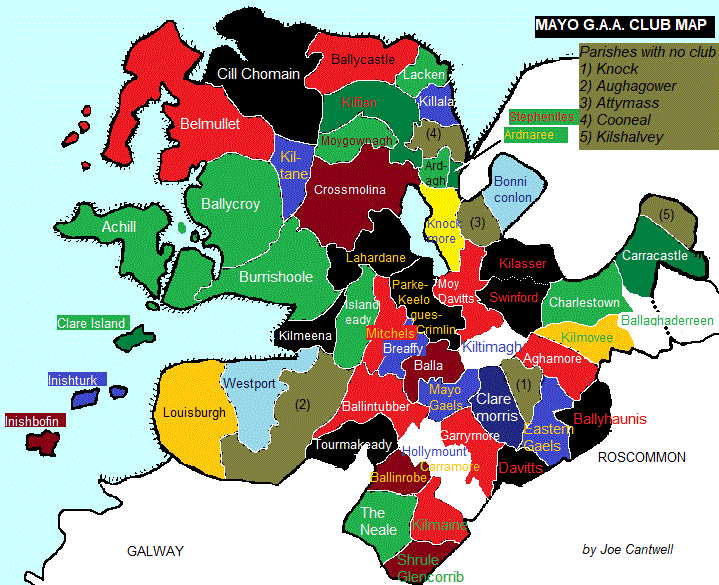
Mayo GAA clubs

Location of County Mayo in Ireland

Year	Winner	Score	Opponent	Score
2025	Ballina Stephenites	2-13	Westport	1-15
2024	Ballina Stephenites	1-12	Knockmore	0-08
2023	Ballina Stephenites	0-06	Breaffy	0-04
2022	Westport	1-09	Ballina Stephenites	1-06
2021	Knockmore	1-09	Belmullet	0-06
2020	Knockmore	1–12	Breaffy	0–13
2019	Ballintubber	1–14	Ballaghaderreen	1–11
2018	Ballintubber	0–12	Breaffy	1-08
2017	Castlebar Mitchels	0–15	Ballintubber	0–13
2016	Castlebar Mitchels	3–13	Knockmore	0–10
2015	**Castlebar Mitchels**	4–10	Breaffy	0-09
2014	Ballintubber	2-09	Castlebar Mitchels	1-09
2013	**Castlebar Mitchels**	1–11	Breaffy	0-08
2012	Ballaghaderreen	1-09	Ballintubber	0-04
2011	Ballintubber	1–10	Castlebar Mitchels	1-09
2010	Ballintubber	0-08	Castlebar Mitchels	0-05
2009	Charlestown Sarsfields	0-09	Knockmore	0-06
2008	Ballaghaderreen	0–13	Charlestown Sarsfields	1-06
2007	**Ballina Stephenites**	3-06	Charlestown Sarsfields	0–13
2006	Crossmolina Deel Rovers	2-08, 1–13 (R)	Ballaghaderreen	1–11, 2–07 (R)
2005	Crossmolina Deel Rovers	2-09	Shrule-Glencorrib	1–11
2004	**Ballina Stephenites**	1-09	Knockmore	0-06
2003	Ballina Stephenites	1–11	Crossmolina Deel Rovers	0–12
2002	**Crossmolina Deel Rovers**	2-09	Knockmore	0–14
2001	**Charlestown Sarsfields**	0–11, 2–16 (R)	Knockmore	2-05, 0–08 (R)
2000	**Crossmolina Deel Rovers**	0–14	Burrishoole	0–11
1999	**Crossmolina Deel Rovers**	0-09	Ballina Stephenites	0-07
1998	**Ballina Stephenites**	0–11	Crossmolina Deel Rovers	0-09
1997	Knockmore	1–11	Kiltimagh	0-09
1996	**Knockmore**	1–10	Ballina Stephenites	1-08
1995	Crossmolina Deel Rovers	0–11	Kiltane	0-07
1994	Hollymount	0–14	Castlebar Mitchels	1-04
1993	**Castlebar Mitchels**	1-07	Balla	0-07
1992	**Knockmore**	1-09	Charlestown Sarsfields	0-09
1991	**Hollymount**	1-06	Westport	1-02
1990	Hollymount	0-08	Knockmore	0-07
1989	Knockmore	2-07	Kiltane	2-06
1988	Castlebar Mitchels	2-06, 1–12 (R)	Crossmolina Deel Rovers	1-09, 0–09 (R)
1987	Ballina Stephenites	1-08	Castlebar Mitchels	2-02
1986	Castlebar Mitchels	1-08	Crossmolina Deel Rovers	0-02
1985	Ballina Stephenites	4-02	Ballaghadereen	1–10
1984	Knockmore	2–11	Lacken	0-04
1983	Knockmore	1–15	Davitts	3-05
1982	Garrymore	1-08	Castlebar Mitchels	0-06
1981	**Garrymore**	1-09	Belmullet	1-05
1980	Knockmore	3-04	Castlebar Mitchels	2-06
1979	Garrymore	2–10	Knockmore	1-07
1978	Castlebar Mitchels	0-08	Claremorris	0-07
1977	Shamrocks	0-08, 4–06 (R)	Garrymore	0-08, 0–13 (R)
1976	Garrymore	1-09	Knockmore	2-05
1975	Garrymore	0–11	Aghamore	0-06
1974	Garrymore	1–12	Aghamore	2-02
1973	**Knockmore**	3–13	Garrymore	2–11
1972	Ballaghaderreen	1–11	Claremorris	0-09
1971	**Claremorris**	2-05	Aghamore	1-06
1970	Castlebar Mitchels	4-09	Garrymore	0–13
1969	Castlebar Mitchels	0–11	Ballina Stephenites	1-04
1968	North Mayo	2–10	Ballina Stephenites	3-04
1967	East Mayo	2-07	Ballina Stephenites	0-09
1966	Ballina Stephenites	0–11	Claremorris	1-03
1965	Claremorris	1–14	Castlebar Mitchels	1-05
1964	Claremorris	2-04	Castlebar Mitchels	0-06
1963	Castlebar Mitchels	3-08	Crossmolina Deel Rovers	0-02
1962	Castlebar Mitchels	1-07	Claremorris	2-03
1961	Claremorris	0-09	Ballina Stephenites	0-07
1960	West Mayo	3-06	Castlebar Mitchels	0-07
1959	Castlebar Mitchels	1-07	East Mayo	1-04
1958	Ballyhaunis	2-05	Ballina Stephenites	2-01
1957	East Mayo	1-07	Crossmolina Deel Rovers	0-07
1956	Castlebar Mitchels	0–14 (R)	Crossmolina Deel Rovers	1-06 (R)
1955	Ballina Stephenites	1–10	Claremorris	1-02
1954	Castlebar Mitchels	2-04	Claremorris	2-03
1953	Castlebar Mitchels	1-08	Ardnaree Sarsfields	0-05
1952	Castlebar Mitchels	6–10	Claremorris	2-05
1951	Castlebar Mitchels	2–10	Louisburgh	1-00
1950	Castlebar Mitchels	3-04	Ballina Stephenites	1-03
1949	Crossmolina Deel Rovers	2-05	Killala	1-03
1948	Castlebar Mitchels	3-02	Crossmolina Deel Rovers	0-03
1947	Ballina Stephenites	3-03	Castlebar Mitchels	0–10
1946	Castlebar Mitchels	3-06	Ballina Stephenites	1-09
1945	Castlebar Mitchels	3-09	Belmullet	0-02
1944	Castlebar Mitchels	1-08	Claremorris	1-01
1943	Ballina Stephenites	0-07	Ballycastle	1-02
1942	Castlebar Mitchels	5-05	Westport	0-04
1941	Castlebar Mitchels	3-06	Ballycastle	0-05
1940	Ballina Stephenites	2-06	Castlebar Mitchels	3-01
1939	Ballycastle	2-03	Castlebar Mitchels	0-08
1938	Ballina Stephenites	4-03	Ballycastle	4-02
1937	Ballycastle	2–11	Westport	0-02
1936	Ballycastle	4-04	Castlebar Mitchels	1-01
1935	Ballina Stephenites	0-06	Castlebar Mitchels	0-04
1934	Castlebar Mitchels	1-04	Ballina Stephenites	1-03
1933	Ballina Stephenites	1-06	Castlebar Mitchels	1-03
1932	Castlebar Mitchels	2-08	Ballina Stephenites	0-06
1931	Castlebar Mitchels	0–10	Ballina Stephenites	0-09
1930	Castlebar Mitchels	3-09	Ballina Stephenites	4-02
1929	Ballina Stephenites	1-02	Westport	0-01
1928	Ballina Stephenites	(awarded title)		
1927	Ballina Stephenites	3-02	Westport	0-01
1926	Ballina Stephenites	(1 pt.)	Ballyhaunis	
1925	Ballina Stephenites	0-07	Castlebar Mitchels	1-03
1924	Ballina Stephenites	0-08	Ballaghadereen	0-00
1923	No Championship			
1922	No Championship			
1921	No Championship			
1920	Ballina Stephenites			
1919	Ballyhaunis		Ballina Stephenites	
1918	Ballina Stephenites	3-03	Ballyhaunis	1-00
1917	Lacken Sarsfields		Ballina Stephenites	
1916	Ballina Stephenites	4-04	Lacken Sarsfields	1-02
1915	Ballina Stephenites	1-03	Ballyhaunis	1-01
1914	Ballina Stephenites	6-03	Ballyhaunis	0-01
1913	Ballina Stephenites		Balla	
1912	Ballina Stephenites	2-01	Westport	0-01
1911	Ballina Stephenites		Castlebar Mitchels	
1910	Ballina Stephenites	3-02	Castlebar Mitchels	0-01
1909	Ballina Stephenites			
1908	Ballina Stephenites	(awarded title)		
1907	Ballina Stephenites	0-05	Derry Croaghpatricks	1-01
1906	Ballina Stephenites	3-07	Kilmeena Macs	0-01
1905	Ballina Stephenites	4-09	Westport Sharpshooters	0-02
1904	Ballina Stephenites	0-06	Castlebar Mitchels	0-02
1903	Castlebar Mitchels	1-04	Ballina Stephenites	0-01
1902	Charlestown Sarsfields		Ballina McBrides	
1891–1901	No Championship			
1890	Ballina Commercials	w/o	Mulranny Brian Borus	scr.
1889	Ballina Stephenites	(awarded title)	Swinford Sextons	
1888	Castlebar Mitchels	1-07	Ballina Commercials	0-01

- Bold indicates Connacht championship winners.

== See also ==
- List of Gaelic Games clubs in Mayo
