= Michael Conroy =

Mayo Gaelic footballer

Personal information
- Native name: Micheál Ó Conraoi (Irish)
- Born: Castlebar, Ireland
- Occupation: Care worker
- Height: 1.75 m (5 ft 9 in)

Sport
- Sport: Gaelic football
- Position: Left corner forward
Club
- Years: Club
- Davitts
Inter-county
- Years: County
- 2004–: Mayo
Inter-county titles
- Connacht titles: 7
- All-Irelands: 0
- NFL: 0
- All Stars: 0

Michael Conroy is a Gaelic footballer who plays for Davitts and the Mayo county team. He started at right corner-forward and scored a point in the 2012 All-Ireland SFC final, which Mayo lost by 0–13 to 2–11 against Donegal.

Conroy attended St Colman's College, Claremorris.
