= Mayo Gaels GAA =

Gaelic games club in County Mayo, Ireland

Mayo Gaels GAA Club
- CLG Gael Maigh Eo
- County: Mayo
- Colours: Blue and Yellow

Playing kits
Standard colours

Senior Club Championships
	All Ireland	Connacht champions	Mayo champions
Football:	-	-	0

Mayo Gaels GAA Club (CLG Gael Mhuigheo) is a Gaelic football club located in Mayo Abbey, Claremorris, County Mayo. The club draws players from the parishes of Mayo Abbey, Facefield and Ballyglass. Mayo Gaels' club colours are blue and yellow.

== External sources ==
- Club Website
