= Noel Stagg =

Irish hurler and Gaelic footballer

Noel Stagg (born 1968) is a hurling and football player. He resides in Hollymount in County Mayo, Ireland.

== Achievements ==
- Captained the Mayo hurling team.
- 2 All-Ireland Titles with Mayo Masters.
- 4 Mayo County Senior Championships with Hollymount.
- Captained Saint Colmans College hurling Team.
- Current selector of Hollymount team along with other former Hollymount legend Jarlath Jennings

== Personal life ==
He is married and has a son Ian and daughter Amy.
