= Shrule-Glencorrib GAA =

Gaelic games club in County Mayo, Ireland

- Sruthair-Gleann Coirib
- County: Mayo
- Colours: Maroon, Green, White

Playing kits
Standard colours

Senior Club Championships
| | All Ireland | Connacht champions | Mayo champions |
|---|---|---|---|
| Football: | 0 | 0 | 0 |

Shrule-Glencorrib GAA is a Gaelic football club based in the village of Shrule on the County Mayo side of the border with County Galway. The club is focused exclusively on the game of Gaelic football. It takes part in competitions organized by Mayo GAA county board.

== Achievements ==
- Mayo Senior Football Championship: Runner-Up 2005

== Notable players ==
- Conor Mortimer
