= Burrishoole GAA =

Gaelic games club in County Mayo, Ireland

Buireas Umhaill
- Founded: 1958
- County: Mayo
- Colours: White and Green
- Grounds: McGovern Park Newport

Playing kits
Standard colours

Senior Club Championships
	All Ireland	Connacht champions	Mayo champions
Football:	-	-	0

Burrishoole GAA (Irish: Buireas Umhaill) is a Gaelic Athletic Association club located in Newport, County Mayo. The club is exclusively focused on the sport of Gaelic football.

In 2022 they won the Mayo LGFA Senior Championship.

== Notable players ==
- Jason Doherty
- Colm McManamon
