= Hollymount Carramore GAA =

Gaelic games club in County Mayo, Ireland

- CLG Maolla
- Founded: 2011
- County: Mayo
- Colours: White, Blue, Gold
- Grounds: St. Coman's Park, Hollymount

Playing kits
Standard colours

Senior Club Championships
	All Ireland	Connacht champions	Mayo champions
Football:	-	-	3

Hollymount Carramore GAA is a Gaelic Athletic Association club in south County Mayo, Ireland. The club is an amalgamation of the two former clubs of Hollymount and Carramore, Hollymount having won 3 Senior championships in the 1990s. Hollymount-Carramore currently compete in the Mayo Intermediate Football Championship.

From 1989 to 1991, Hollymount won every championship match they played in Mayo, beginning with the 1989 Intermediate campaign (when they won the title) and then winning successive Senior titles.

== History ==
Located between Ballinrobe and Claremorris, the club's pitch is called St Coman's Park and located in Hollymount.

== Achievements ==
- All-Ireland Intermediate Club Football Championship: Runner-Up 2016
- Mayo Intermediate Football Championship: 2015
- Connacht Intermediate Club Football Championship: 2015

== Notable players ==
- Noel Stagg

Mick Morris Noel Connolly
