= Westport GAA =

Gaelic games club in County Mayo, Ireland

- CLG Cathair na Mart
- County: Mayo
- Colours
- Coordinates: 53.805°N 9.523°W

Playing kits
Standard colours

Senior Club Championships
	All Ireland	Connacht champions	Mayo champions
Football:	-	-	1
Hurling:	-	-	4

Westport GAA is a Gaelic Athletic Association club located in Westport, County Mayo, Ireland. The club fields teams in both Gaelic football and hurling.

== Achievements ==
- All-Ireland Intermediate Club Football Championship Winners 2017
- Connacht Intermediate Club Football Championship Winners 2016
- Mayo Senior Football ChampionshipWinners 2022 Runners-Up 1905, 1907, 1912, 1927, 1929, 1937, 1942, 1991
- Mayo Senior Hurling Championship Winners 1962, 1964, 1969, 1970
- Mayo Intermediate Football Championship Winners 2009, 2016
- Mayo Junior Football Championship Winners 1937, 1941, 1970
- Mayo Under 21 Football Championship Winners 2017
- Mayo Minor Football Championship Winners 2018
- Mayo Junior B Football Championship Winners 2018
- Mayo Intermediate Ladies Football Championship Winners 2018

== Notable players ==
- Kevin Keane
- Lee Keegan

Preceded by St. Mary's Cahirciveen	All-Ireland Intermediate Club Football Champions; 2017	Succeeded by Moy Tír Na nÓg
