= Aghamore GAA =

Gaelic games club in County Mayo, Ireland

- CLG Achadh Mór
- Founded: 1904
- County: Mayo
- Colours: White, Red
- Grounds: Aghamore GAA Pitch
- Coordinates: 53°49′38″N 8°49′11″W

Playing kits
Standard	Change

Senior Club Championships
	All Ireland	Connacht champions	Mayo champions
Football:	0	0	1

Aghamore GAA is a Gaelic Athletic Association (GAA) club in the parish of Aghamore, County Mayo in Ireland. It takes in players from the villages of Aghamore and Tooreen in the parish of Aghamore, while also taking in the neighbouring parish of Knock in its catchment area. The club focuses primarily on Gaelic football, with hurling within the parish done with Tooreen Hurling Club. Aghamore GAA competes at senior level in the Mayo Senior Football Championship. The club competes in Ladies' Gaelic football and play in the Intermediate championship, having won the Junior Championship in 2024.

== History ==
Gaelic football has a long tradition of being played within the parish of Aghamore. A number of clubs were situated within the parish during the early years of the Gaelic Athletic Association. These included Annagh Rovers, Aghamore Wanderers, Crossard Shamrocks and Kilkelly Davitts. These clubs however fell into decline in the 1890s and a team from within the parish would not emerge again until 1905.

== Honours ==
- Mayo Senior Football Championship (1): 1977 (As Shamrocks)
- Mayo Intermediate Football Championship (2): 1970, 2008
- Mayo Intermidate B Football Championship (1): 1994
- Mayo Junior Football Championship (2): 1969, 2004
- Mayo Senior Football League Division 1 (1): 1988
- Mayo Senior Football League Division 2 (1): 2015
- Mayo Senior Football League Division 3 (1): 2011
- Mayo Senior Football League Division 5 (1): 2023
- Mayo Under 21 A Football Championship (3): 1981, 2015, 2016
- Mayo Under 21 B Football Championship (1): 2024
- Mayo Minor A Football Championship (1): 1966
- Connacht Minor B Club Football Championship (1): 2017 (As Annagh Rovers. Amalgamation with Ballyhaunis GAA)
- Mayo Minor B Football Championship (1): 2017 (As Annagh Rovers. Amalgamation with Ballyhaunis GAA)
- Mayo Minor C Football Championship (1): 2019
- Mayo Minor Football League Division 1 (1): 2008
- Mayo Minor Football League Division 3 (1): 2006

== Notable players ==
- Brendan Harrison, 2016 All Star
- Alan Freeman, Mayo footballer
