= Belmullet GAA =

Gaelic games club in County Mayo, Ireland

CLG Béal An Mhuirthead
- Belmullet GAA
- Founded: 1936
- County: Mayo
- Colours: Red, White
- Grounds: Tallagh

Playing kits
Standard colours

Senior Club Championships
| | All Ireland | Connacht champions | Mayo champions |
|---|---|---|---|
| Football: | 0 | - | 0 |

Belmullet GAA Irish: CLG Béal an Mhuirthead is a Gaelic Athletic Association club located in Belmullet, County Mayo, Ireland.

== Achievements ==
- All-Ireland Junior Club Football Championship Runners-Up 2002
- Connacht Junior Club Football Championship Winners 2002
- Mayo Senior Football Championship Runners-Up 1945, 1981, 2021
- Mayo Intermediate Football Championship Winners 1974, 2018
- Mayo Junior Football Championship Winners 2001
- Mayo Senior Hurling Championship Winners 1957
- Craobh Uile éireann Comórtas Peile na Gaeltacht 2006, 2010

== Notable players ==
- Billy Joe Padden
- Willie Joe Padden (2 Time All Star Winner in 1985 and 1989)
- Chris Barrett (All Star Winner in 2017)
- Ryan O’Donoghue (All Ireland Winner 2026)
- Seamus Howard (All Ireland Winner 2026)
- Ronan Murray (former EFL footballer for Ipswich Town, League of Ireland winner with Dundalk in 2018)
- Stephen Carolan
- Eoin O'Donoghue

== External sources ==
- Club Website
