= Ballyhaunis GAA =

Football and hurling club in Ballyhaunis, Ireland

- CLG Beal atha hAmhnais
- County: Mayo
- Nickname: Haunis
- Colours: Red, Black
- Grounds: Knock Road, Ballyhaunis

Playing kits
Standard colours

Senior Club Championships
| | All Ireland | Connacht champions | Mayo champions |
|---|---|---|---|
| Football: | 0 | 0 | 2 |
| Hurling: | 0 | 0 | 13 |

Ballyhaunis GAA is a Gaelic Athletic Association club located in the town of Ballyhaunis in eastern County Mayo, Ireland. The club fields both football and hurling teams and is a member of the East division of Mayo GAA.

== Achievements ==
- Mayo Senior Hurling Championship winners 2002, 2004, 2005, 2006, 2008, 2009, 2010, 2011, 2012, 2014, 2015, 2016, 2020
- Connacht Senior Club Hurling Championship: runners-up 2004
- Connacht Intermediate Club Hurling Championship: runners-up 2009, 2010, 2014, 2016

== Notable players ==
- J. J. Cribbin
- Keith Higgins
- Jack Coyne
