= Breaffy GAA =

Gaelic sports club in County Mayo, Ireland

- CLG Bréachmhaigh
- Founded: 1953
- County: Mayo
- Colours: Blue, White
- Grounds: Breaffy

Playing kits
Standard colours

Senior Club Championships
| | All Ireland | Connacht champions | Mayo champions |
|---|---|---|---|
| Football: | 0 | 0 | 0 |

Breaffy GAA is a Gaelic Athletic Association club based in Breaffy in County Mayo, Ireland.

== Notable players ==
- Seamus O'Shea
- Aidan O'Shea
- Rob Hennelly
- Matthew Ruane
- Conor O'Shea

== Notable managers ==
- Peter Ford
