= Knockmore GAA =

Gaelic games club in County Mayo, Ireland

Knockmore
- Cnoc Mór
- County: Mayo
- Colours: Saffron and Blue
- Grounds: St. Joseph's Park Knockmore

Playing kits
Standard colours

Senior Club Championships
	All Ireland	Connacht champions	Mayo champions
Football:	-	-	10

Knockmore GAA is a Gaelic Athletic Association club, based in Knockmore, County Mayo, Ireland. The club is a member of the Mayo GAA county board, and fields Gaelic football teams in competitions run by the board.

The club was founded in 1960.

Joe Brolly joined as a selector and head coach in 2025, working with Dessie Sloyan and manager Ray Dempsey.

== Achievements ==
- All-Ireland Senior Club Football Championship Runners-Up 1997
- Connacht Senior Club Football Championship Winners 1973-74, 1992–93, 1996–97
- Mayo Senior Football Championship Winners 1973, 1980, 1983, 1984, 1989, 1992, 1996, 1997, 2020, 2021

== Notable players ==
- Kevin McLoughlin
- Ray Dempsey
