= Castlebar Mitchels GAA =

Gaelic games club in County Mayo, Ireland

Castlebar Mitchels
- Na Mistéalaigh, Caisleán an Bharriagh
- Founded: 1885
- County: Mayo
- Nickname: Mitchels
- Colours: Red, Gold
- Grounds: Elverys MacHale Park, MacHale Road, Castlebar
- Coordinates: 53.853464°N 9.286461°W

Playing kits
Standard	Change

Senior Club Championships
	All Ireland	Connacht champions	Mayo champions
Football:	0	4	31
Hurling:	0	0	2

Castlebar Mitchels is a Gaelic Athletic Association club based in the Castlebar area in County Mayo, Ireland. The club was founded in 1885 and is named after the nationalist John Mitchel (1815–1875). Though football is the club's dominant sport, hurling is also played.

== Honours ==
- All-Ireland Senior Club Football Championship: Runner-Up 1994, 2014, 2016
- Connacht Senior Club Football Championship: 1969, 1993, 2013, 2015
- Mayo Senior Football Championship: (30 titles) 1888, 1903, 1930–1932, 1934, 1941–1942, 1944–1946, 1948, 1950–1954, 1956, 1959, 1962–1963, 1969, 1970, 1978, 1986, 1988, 1993, 2013 2015, 2016, 2017, 2026
- Mayo Senior Hurling Championship: Winners (2): 1952, 1955 (Runners-up 2019)

== Notable players ==
- Tom Cunniffe
- Paddy Durcan
- Barry Moran
- Neil Douglas
- Richie Feeney
- Patsy Flannelly
- Henry Kenny
- John Maughan
- Éamonn Mongey
- Padraig Carney
- Donal Vaughan

== External sources ==
- Club Website
