= Claremorris GAA =

Gaelic games club in County Mayo, Ireland

Claremorris
- Clár Chlainne Mhuiris
- Founded: 1884
- County: Mayo
- Colours: Blue, white
- Grounds: Claremorris

Playing kits
Standard colours

Senior Club Championships
	All Ireland	Connacht champions	Mayo champions
Football:	0	1	4
Hurling:	-	-	2

Claremorris GAA is a Gaelic Athletic Association Club based in the town of Claremorris in County Mayo, Ireland. The club was founded in 1884 and is a member of the South division of Mayo GAA. The club represents and draws players from the town of Claremorris and half parish of Barnacarroll to the north.

The club currently competes at Senior level and has won the Mayo Senior Football Championship 4 times in the 1960s and 1970s. The club previously had a hurling team which won 2 Mayo Senior Hurling Championship titles in 1968 and 1971 and has a competitive Ladies' football team.

== Notable players ==
- Henry Dixon
- Austin Garvin
- JP Kean

== Honours ==
- Mayo Senior Football Championships (4): 1961, 1964, 1965, 1971
- Connacht Senior Club Football Championship (1): 1972
- Mayo Senior Hurling Championships (2): 1968, 1971
