= Davitts GAA =

Gaelic games club in County Mayo, Ireland

- CLG Na Daibheidí
- Founded: 1974
- County: Mayo
- Colours: Black and Red
- Coordinates: 53°40′21″N 8°57′30″W

Playing kits
Standard colours

Davitts GAA is a Gaelic Athletic Association club based in the parish of Kilvine in south County Mayo, Ireland.

== History ==
Gaelic football was played in the parish since the end of the Civil War. In the early 1950s more concerted efforts were made to bring some organisation to football in the parish. The two teams of Irishtown and Ballindine amalgamated and affiliated in 1974.

== Club name ==
Throughout the ‘50s and ‘60s the team played under the name ‘Ballindine’ at one point and ‘Irishtown’ at another. At one stage the name ‘St. Josephs’ was also used. Since the name of the club seemed to be a bone of contention at times, it was decided to try and settle on a name to unite both sides of the parish. At a meeting in the People’s Hall in Ballindine in 1974, it was decided that the club be named ‘Davitts’, from Michael Davitt of nearby Straide. Initially, this name was to be on a trial basis for one year but has lasted ever since.

== Achievements ==
- All-Ireland Intermediate Club Football Championship: Runner-Up 2012
- Connacht Intermediate Club Football Championship: 2011
- Mayo Intermediate Football Championship 2011, 2026

== Notable players ==
- Colm Boyle
- Michael Conroy
