= Ballaghaderreen GAA =

Gaelic football club in County Roscommon, Ireland

- CLG Ballach an Doirín
- Founded: 1885
- County: Mayo
- Nickname: Ballagh
- Colours: White and Green
- Grounds: Ballaghaderreen

Playing kits
Standard colours

Senior Club Championships
	All Ireland	Connacht champions	Mayo champions
Football:	0	0	3

Ballaghaderreen GAA is a Gaelic Athletic Association (GAA) club based in Ballaghaderreen, County Roscommon in Ireland. The main sport played is Gaelic football. While based in County Roscommon, the club contests competitions organised by the Mayo County Board and has won three Mayo Senior Football Championship titles.

== History ==
When the club was founded in 1885, the town of Ballaghaderreen was located in County Mayo and the club went under the name "Faugh A Ballagh".

The club is almost as old as the Gaelic Athletic Association itself and a note in the Western People newspaper states that the club met in 1886 for a practice match. This was the first recorded meeting of the club since 1885. The game mentioned in the Western People was played in a field located near the convent in the town and was vested in (and still is) in local trustees. The ground also had a cinder track and cycling and athletic meetings were held there.

While, under the Local Government (Ireland) Act 1898, Ballaghaderreen was transferred from County Mayo to County Roscommon, the GAA club retained its affiliation to the Mayo County Board.

A new clubhouse and pitch were opened by the club in 1980 and a new stand was completed in 1995. The club's facilities underwent further development in the 2000s.

Ballaghaderreen has been represented at county level on several occasions, with club members Andy Moran, David Drake and David McBrien all representing the club on the Mayo senior panel.

== Notable players ==
- Noel Durkin
- Dermot Flanagan
- Pearce Hanley
- Andy Moran
- John Morley

== Honours ==
- Mayo Senior Football Championships (3): 1972, 2008, 2012
- Mayo Senior Hurling Championships (4): 1923, 1924, 1950, 1953
