= Ballintubber GAA =

Gaelic games club in County Mayo, Ireland

Ballintubber GAA, Baile An Tobair CLG
- CLG Báile an Tobair
- Founded: 1885
- County: Mayo
- Nickname: Tubber
- Colours: Red & White
- Grounds: Ray Prendergast Memorial Park, Ballintubber Resource Center.

Playing kits
Standard	Reserve

Ballintubber GAA is a Gaelic Athletic Association club, based in Ballintubber, County Mayo, Ireland. The club is a member of the Mayo GAA county board, and fields Gaelic football teams in competitions run by the board. Ballintubber's home pitch is located at the Ray Prendergast Memorial Park, Carrowkeel, Clogher, Claremorris, County Mayo. Ireland.

== Achievements ==
- Connacht Intermediate Club Football Championship Runner-Up 2007
- Mayo Senior Football Championship Winners 2010, 2011, 2014, 2018 2019
- Mayo Intermediate Football Championship Winners 1976, 1990, 2007 Runners-Up 1967, 1968, 1969, 1987, 1997, 1999, 2003
- Mayo Junior Football Championship Runners-Up 1960, 1975
- Mayo Under-21 A Football Championship Winners 1976, 2008, 2009 Runners-Up 1999, 2010
- Mayo Minor A Football Championship Winners 2004

== Notable players ==
- Paddy Prendergast
- Bryan Walsh
- Alan Dillon
- Diarmuid O'Connor
- Cillian O'Connor
- Michael Plunkett
- James Horan
- Jason Gibbons

== External sources ==
- Ballintubber GAA club site
