= Ballina Stephenites GAA =

Gaelic games club in County Mayo, Ireland

Ballina Stephenites
- Stiofánaigh Béil an Atha
- Founded: 1886
- County: Mayo
- Colours: Green, Red
- Grounds: James Stephens Park
- Coordinates: 54°06′43″N 9°09′46″W

Playing kits
Standard colours

Senior Club Championships
| | All Ireland | Connacht champions | Mayo champions |
|---|---|---|---|
| Football: | 1 | 3 | 39 |

Ballina Stephenites is a Gaelic Athletic Association club based in the Ballina area in County Mayo, Ireland. They are the most successful club in Mayo and fourth most successful in Ireland based on trophy amount.

== History ==
The Ballina Stephenites Club was founded on the 28th (last Saturday) of August 1886 by James Wallace Melvin. (Pen-name Larry Doolan) who also penned the Club's rallying song-"Forward to the goal of victory" The first meeting was held in "Barney's Boreen" at the top of Convent Hill. The first President of the Club was Tom Courell with "Cappy" Fitzgerald as Secretary and Michael Connolly as Treasurer. The club is named for James Stephens (1825–1901).

Ballina Stephenites were affiliated to the Mayo County Board a short time later and played their first "official" fixture in Jones' Field in Ardnaree against Commercials Junior. The Club won 13 consecutive Senior Football Championships from 1904 - 1916 and 2 Archbishop Croke Cups in 1908 and 1909.

In 1933 James Stephens Park was opened by P. J. Ruttledge, Minister for Justice - (A Ballina man). Bord Na N'óg was founded in 1972 resulting in many juvenile successes since.

The Club hosted 2 G.A.A. Congress weeks in 1984 and 1985 and "Welcome Home Week" in 1984 - the Centenary year of the G.A.A. The Club has produced 5 G.A.A. Football All-Stars in - Kevin McStay, Jimmy Browne, Liam McHale, Ger Cafferkey and David Clarke.

In 2005 a team captained by Brian Ruane defeated Portlaoise to win the Andy Merrigan cup as All-Ireland Senior Club Football Championship winners.

Rev. Fr. Gerry Courell, grandson of Tom Courell and son of Gerald, was the club patron until his passing in May 2012, maintaining a proud family association with the club.

== Notable players ==
- David Brady
- Ger Brady
- Jimmy Browne
- David Clarke
- Ger Cafferkey
- Pat Harte
- Dave Heffernan
- Ivan Heffernan
- Liam McHale
- Kevin McStay

== Honours ==
- Mayo Senior Football Championships: 39
  - 1889, 1904, 1905, 1906, 1907, 1908, 1909, 1910, 1911, 1912, 1913, 1914, 1915, 1916, 1918, 1920, 1924, 1925, 1926, 1927, 1928, 1929, 1933, 1935, 1938, 1940, 1943, 1947, 1955, 1966, 1985, 1987, 1998, 2003, 2004, 2007, 2023, 2024, 2025
- Connacht Senior Club Football Championship: 3
  - 1998, 2004, 2007
- All-Ireland Senior Club Football Championship: 1
  - 2004/05

== External sources ==
- Club Website
