= Kiltane GAA =

Gaelic games club in County Mayo, Ireland

Kiltane
- CLG Cill tSéadhna
- County: Mayo
- Colours: Blue and Yellow

Playing kits
Standard colours

Kiltane GAA (CLG Cill tSéadhna) is a Gaelic football club located in Bangor Erris, County Mayo. The club existed under the name St. Patrick's from 1962 until 1971.

== Honours ==
- All-Ireland Intermediate Club Football Championship: Runner-Up 2014
- Mayo Intermediate Football Championship 1973, 2013
- Connacht Intermediate Club Football Championship 2013
- Mayo Senior Football League Division 1 Championship 1992
- Mayo Senior Global Windows League Championship 1992
- Mayo Junior Football Championship 1972

== Notable players ==
- Tommy Conroy
- Johnny Carey
