= Charlestown Sarsfields GAA =

Gaelic games club in County Mayo, Ireland

- CLG Na Sairséalaigh, Baile Chathail
- Founded: 1888
- County: Mayo
- Colours: Green and White
- Grounds: Fr. O'Hara Park
- Coordinates: 53°57′31″N 8°48′13″W

Playing kits
Standard colours

Senior Club Championships
	All Ireland	Connacht champions	Mayo champions
Football:	-	1	3

Charlestown Sarsfields GAA is a Gaelic Athletic Association club in Charlestown, County Mayo, Ireland. Their most notable achievement was winning the Connacht Senior Club Football Championship in 2001. Tom Parsons is a notable current player, having won two Connacht titles with Mayo.

The club is named for the 17th-century Irish Jacobite leader Patrick Sarsfield, 1st Earl of Lucan.

== Notable players ==
- Tom Parsons
- Colm Horkan

== Honours ==
- Connacht Senior Club Football Championship (1): 2001
- Mayo Senior Football Championship (3): 1902, 2001, 2009
