= Garrymore GAA =

Gaelic games club in County Mayo, Ireland

Garrymore
- An Garraí Mór
- Founded: 1918
- County: Mayo
- Colours: Red, white
- Grounds: Killeenrevagh, County Mayo
- Coordinates: 53.646848°N 9.021186°W

Playing kits
Standard colours

Garrymore GAA (Irish: CLG An Gharraí Mór) is a Gaelic football club in Killeenrevagh, County Mayo, Ireland. They won the Connacht Senior Club Football Championship in 1981. Notable players include Mervin Connolly Enda Varley and Noel Tierney (who also played with Milltown). After many years of success in the 70's and 80's Garrymore have become a well-known club in Connaught.

== Honours ==
- All-Ireland Senior Club Football Championship:
  - Runner-Up 1982
- Connacht Senior Club Football Championship: 1
  - 1981
- Mayo Senior Football Championship: 6
  - 1974, 1975, 1976, 1979, 1981, 1982

== Notable players ==
- Enda Varley
- Noel Tierney
- Tony Corcoran
- Billy Fitzpatrick
- Pádraic Monaghan
