= Connacht Senior Club Football Championship =

Gaelic Football tournament

- Current season or competition: 2026 Connacht Senior Club Football Championship
- Irish: Peile Connachta na gClub
- Founded: 1966
- Trophy: Shane McGettigan Cup
- Title holders: St Brigid's (6th title)
- Most titles: Corofin (10 titles)
- Sponsors: AIB

The Connacht Senior Club Football Championship (Connacht Club SFC for short) is an annual Gaelic football tournament played between senior clubs in Connacht, with one qualifying from each of the five individual county championships. The winners of the Connacht football championship qualify for the All-Ireland Senior Club Football Championship.

== History ==
The Connacht Senior Club Football Championship is an annual Gaelic football tournament played on a knockout basis between the senior club championship winners of the competing counties in Connacht, with the addition of the London champions since 2018. Prior to this, the London champions entered the all-Ireland series at the quarter final stage. The current holders of the title are Padraig Pearses of Roscommon. While a provincial competition existed prior to 1970, Galway side Fr. Griffins were the first winners of the competition in its current format, in the 1970–71 season. The most successful club is Corofin of Galway, who have won the competition on nine occasions, while Roscommon's Clann na nGael hold the record for consecutive titles, with their six-in-a-row from 1984 to 1989. Galway clubs have the most wins, with 19 titles.

The trophy is the Shane McGettigan Cup, named after an Allen Gaels and Leitrim player, who died in a construction accident in Quincy, Massachusetts, in 1998, aged just 21. He was the son of singer Charlie McGettigan.

== Wins listed by club ==
	Team	Wins	Years won	County
1	Corofin	10	1991, 1995, 1997, 2008, 2009, 2014, 2016, 2017, 2018, 2019	Galway
2	Clann na nGael	7	1982, 1984, 1985, 1986, 1987, 1988, 1989	Roscommon
3	St Brigid's	6	2006, 2010, 2011, 2012, 2023, 2025	Roscommon
4	Castlebar Mitchels	4	1969, 1993, 2013, 2015	Mayo
5	St Mary's	3	1977, 1980, 1983	Sligo
5	Knockmore	3	1973, 1992, 1996	Mayo
5	Crossmolina Deel Rovers	3	1999, 2000, 2002	Mayo
5	Ballina Stephenites	3	1998, 2004, 2007	Mayo
6	Fr. Griffin's	2	1970, 1972	Galway
6	Roscommon Gaels	2	1974, 1975	Roscommon
6	Killererin	2	1976, 1978	Galway
6	Salthill/Knocknacarra	2	1990, 2005	Galway
8	Dunmore MacHales	1	1966	Galway
8	Castlerea St Kevin's	1	1968	Roscommon
8	Claremorris	1	1971	Mayo
8	St Grellan's	1	1979	Galway
8	Garrymore	1	1981	Mayo
8	Tuam Stars	1	1994	Galway
8	Charlestown Sarsfields	1	2001	Mayo
8	Caltra	1	2003	Galway
8	Padraig Pearses	1	2021	Roscommon
8	Maigh Cuilinn	1	2022	Galway
8	Coolera/Strandhill	1	2024	Sligo

== Wins listed by county ==
#	County	Connacht Titles	Runners-up	Last provincial winners
1	Galway clubs	21	14	Moycullen, 2022
2	Roscommon clubs	17	12	St. Brigid's, 2025
3	Mayo clubs	16	17	Castlebar Mitchels, 2015
4	Sligo clubs	4	7	Coolera/Strandhill, 2024
5	Leitrim clubs	0	8	

== List of finals ==
=== List of Connacht SFC finals ===
Year	Winners			Runners-up		
Year	County	Club	Score	County	Club	Score
2025	Roscommon	St Brigid's	1-16	Galway	Moycullen	1-14
2024	Sligo	Coolera/Strandhill	1-15	Roscommon	Pádraig Pearse's	1-14
2023	Roscommon	St Brigid's	1-13	Galway	Corofin	2-05
2022	Galway	Moycullen	0-13	Sligo	Tourlestrane	0-06
2021	Roscommon	Pádraig Pearse's	1-13	Mayo	Knockmore	1-11
2020	Cancelled due to the impact of the COVID-19 pandemic on Gaelic games					
2019	Galway	Corofin	1-10	Roscommon	Pádraig Pearse's	0-07
2018	Galway	Corofin	2-10	Mayo	Ballintubber	1-09
2017	Galway	Corofin	2-13	Mayo	Castlebar Mitchels	1-12
2016	Galway	Corofin	2-13	Roscommon	St Brigid's	0-05
2015	Mayo	Castlebar Mitchels	2-10	Galway	Corofin	0-11
2014	Galway	Corofin	2-13	Mayo	Ballintubber	1-07
2013	Mayo	Castlebar Mitchels	3-13	Roscommon	St Brigid's	2-12
2012	Roscommon	St Brigid's	1-12	Mayo	Ballaghadereen	0-06
2011	Roscommon	St Brigid's	0-11	Galway	Corofin	0-10
2010	Roscommon	St Brigid's	2-14	Galway	Killererin	1-10
2009	Galway	Corofin	2-14	Mayo	Charlestown Sarsfields	0-07
2008	Galway	Corofin	0-11	Sligo	Eastern Harps	0-06
2007	Mayo	Ballina Stephenites	2-08	Roscommon	St Brigid's	0-12
2006	Roscommon	St Brigid's	1-10	Galway	Corofin	3-03
2005	Galway	Salthill-Knocknacarra	1-10	Roscommon	St Brigid's	0-05
2004	Mayo	Ballina Stephenites	1-13	Galway	Killererin	2-06
2003	Galway	Caltra	1-06	Sligo	Curry	0-06
2002	Mayo	Crossmolina Deel Rovers	1-11	Roscommon	Strokestown	0-10
2001	Mayo	Charlestown Sarsfields	2-09	Galway	Annaghdown	2-07
2000	Mayo	Crossmolina Deel Rovers	1-10	Galway	Corofin	0-05
1999	Mayo	Crossmolina Deel Rovers	0-09, 1-07 (R)	Roscommon	Roscommon Gaels	0-09, 0-05 (R)
1998	Mayo	Ballina Stephenites	1-10	Roscommon	Roscommon Gaels	0-06
1997	Galway	Corofin	2-10	Leitrim	Allen Gaels	0-11
1996	Mayo	Knockmore	1-05	Roscommon	Clann na nGael	0-06
1995	Galway	Corofin	2-11	Leitrim	St Mary's, Kiltoghert	0-10
1994	Galway	Tuam Stars	2-09	Leitrim	Aughawillan	1-08
1993	Mayo	Castlebar Mitchels	1-09, 1-07 (R)	Roscommon	Clann na nGael	0-12, 0-09 (R)
1992	Mayo	Knockmore	4-04	Leitrim	Aughawillan	0-07
1991	Galway	Corofin	2-05	Roscommon	Clann na nGael	0-09
1990	Galway	Salthill-Knocknacarra	0-11	Leitrim	Ballinamore Seán O'Heslin's	0-05
1989	Roscommon	Clann na nGael	3-10	Mayo	Knockmore	0-07
1988	Roscommon	Clann na nGael	1-08	Mayo	Castlebar Mitchels	0-09
1987	Roscommon	Clann na nGael	0-09	Mayo	Ballina Stephenites	0-08
1986	Roscommon	Clann na nGael	2-09	Leitrim	Ballinamore Seán O'Heslin's	2-04
1985	Roscommon	Clann na nGael	0-10	Mayo	Ballina Stephenites	1-05
1984	Roscommon	Clann na nGael	1-06, 1-07 (R)	Sligo	St Mary's	0-09, 0-09 (R)
1983	Sligo	St Mary's	1-07	Mayo	Knockmore	0-05
1982	Roscommon	Clann na nGael	2-06	Sligo	Tourlestrane	1-03
1981	Mayo	Garrymore	0-09	Sligo	St Mary's	1-05
1980	Sligo	St Mary's	3-06	Galway	St Grellan's	3-03
1979	Galway	St Grellan's	0-04, 0-09 (R)	Sligo	St Mary's	0-04, 0-08 (R)
1978	Galway	Killererin	1-11	Mayo	Castlebar Mitchels	1-04
1977	Sligo	St Mary's	4-06	Galway	Corofin	1-09
1976	Galway	Killererin	3-08	Mayo	Garrymore	0-05
1975	Roscommon	Roscommon Gaels	0-06	Galway	Fr. Griffins	0-05
1974	Roscommon	Roscommon Gaels	0-11, 1-12 (R)	Mayo	Garrymore	0-11, 0-07 (R)
1973	Mayo	Knockmore	4-10	Leitrim	Ballinamore Seán O'Heslin's	0-08
1972	Galway	Fr. Griffins	1-08	Mayo	Ballaghadereen	0-06
1971	Mayo	Claremorris	0-10	Galway	Milltown	1-05
1970	Galway	Fr. Griffins	2-09	Mayo	Castlebar Mitchels	1-10
1969	Mayo	Castlebar Mitchels	2-10	Galway	Dunmore MacHales	0-10
1968	Roscommon	Castlerea St Kevin's	3-07	Leitrim	Ballinamore Seán O'Heslin's	1-07
1967	Not contested					
1966	Galway	Dunmore MacHales	1-10	Mayo	Ballina Stephenites	1-09
