= List of Mayo inter-county footballers =

This is a very incomplete list of Gaelic footballers who have played at senior level for the Mayo county team.

== List of players ==
=== B ===
- Chris Barrett: 13 seasons, until 2020: 85 appearances (47 championship appearances)
- Colm Boyle: 2008–2021, 120 appearances
- Peter Burke

=== C ===
- Ger Cafferkey: Until 2019, 104 league and championship appearances
- David Clarke, 2002–2020, 133 appearances (56 championship appearances)
- Joe Corcoran: Until 1974, 96 appearances, scored 20 goals and 358 points

=== D ===
- Alan Dillon
- Ray Dempsey

=== F ===
- Anthony Finnerty
- Dermot Flanagan
- Frank Fleming

=== H ===
- Keith Higgins: 2005–2020, 75 championship appearances
- Pat Holmes
- James Horan

=== I ===
- Gabriel Irwin

=== M ===
- Ciarán McDonald: 1994–2007
- Kobe McDonald
- Liam McHale
- Colm McManamon
- Kevin McStay
- Andy Moran: Until 2019
- Conor Mortimer
- Michael Moyles
- Mick Mulderrig was captain in 1932 All Ireland final lost to Kerry.

=== N ===
- James Nallen

=== O ===
- Aidan O'Shea
- Séamus O'Shea: Until 2020

=== P ===
- Willie Joe Padden
- Tom Parsons: 2008–2020, 84 appearances

=== V ===
- Donal Vaughan: 12 years, until 2020
