= 2004 All-Ireland Senior Football Championship final =

2004 All-Ireland Football Championship final
- Event: 2004 All-Ireland Senior Football Championship
Kerry	Mayo
1–20 (23)	2–9 (15)
- Date: 26 September 2004
- Venue: Croke Park, Dublin
- Referee: Pat McEnaney (Monaghan)
- Attendance: 79,749

The 2004 All-Ireland Senior Football Championship final was the 117th All-Ireland Final and the deciding match of the 2004 All-Ireland Senior Football Championship, an inter-county Gaelic football tournament for the top teams in Ireland.

== Match ==
=== Summary ===
Mayo were hoping to bridge a gap that stretched back to their All-Ireland football title winning team of 1951. They failed, though less miserably than in 2006. Mayo lost their fourth final in a row; in the end Kerry only won by eight points. Dara Ó Cinnéide was the winning captain, while manager Jack O'Connor won the title in his first season in charge. The match was shown live in Ireland on RTÉ2 as part of The Sunday Game with match commentary from Ger Canning and Martin Carney.

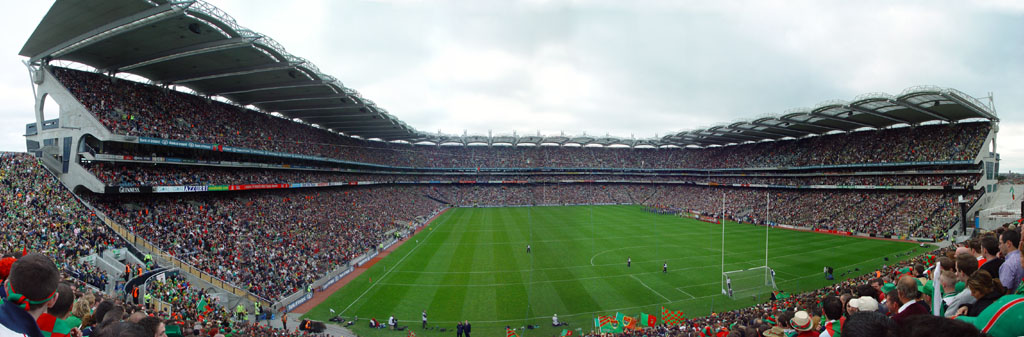
Croke Park kitted out in the green and red of long-suffering Mayo fans at the 2004 All-Ireland Senior Football Championship final. Mayo's losing streak in All-Ireland finals continued as they were hammered by Kerry.

Largely regarded as one of the most disappointing All-Ireland football finals for many years, Mayo's capitulation drove spectators from the stadium in their thousands, with Kerry leading by 1–12 to 1–4 at half-time. Kerry racked up a total of 1–20, the highest team score in an All-Ireland SFC final since the time of 'Bomber' Liston and the 5–11 that decimated Dublin in 1978. Mayo returned to the All-Ireland SFC final two years later, to be torn apart by Kerry all over again in a final when Kerry surpassed the score they achieved in 2004.

In 2022, Martin Breheny listed it among "five of the worst" All-Ireland SFC finals since 1972.

=== Details ===
26 September 2004
Final

Kerry	1–20 – 2–9	Mayo
	Report

Croke Park, Dublin
Referee: Pat McEnaney (Monaghan)

Kerry
Mayo

Kerry:
1	Diarmuid Murphy
2	Tom O'Sullivan
3	Michael McCarthy
4	Aidan O'Mahony
5	Tomás Ó Sé	Substituted off
6	Éamonn Fitzmaurice
7	Marc Ó Sé
8	Eoin Brosnan
9	William Kirby
10	Liam Hassett	Substituted off
11	Declan O'Sullivan
12	Paul Galvin	Substituted off
13	Colm Cooper
14	Dara Ó Cinnéide (c)	Substituted off
15	Johnny Crowley	Substituted off
Substitutes:
19	Seamus Moynihan for L. Hassett	Substituted on
17	Mike Frank Russell for J. Crowley	Substituted on
21	Ronan O'Connor for D. Ó Cinnéide	Substituted on
18	Paddy Kelly for P. Galvin	Substituted on
25	Brendan Guiney for T. Ó Sé	Substituted on
Manager:
Jack O'Connor

Mayo:
1	Peter Burke
2	Dermot Geraghty	Substituted off
3	David Heaney	Substituted off
4	Gary Ruane (c)
5	Peadar Gardiner
6	James Nallen
7	Pat Kelly
8	Ronan McGarrity
9	Fergal Kelly	Substituted off
10	James Gill	Substituted off
11	Ciarán McDonald
12	Alan Dillon
13	Conor Mortimer	Substituted off
14	Trevor Mortimer
15	Brian Maloney
Substitutes:
25	David Brady for Kelly	Substituted on
18	Conor Moran for Geraghty	Substituted on
30	Michael Conroy for Gill	Substituted on
27	Andy Moran for C. Mortimer	Substituted on
22	Pat Navin for Heaney	Substituted on
Manager:
John Maughan

Kerry subs not used

16 K. Cremin
20 M. Quirke
22 J. Sheehan
23 D. Quill
24 T. Griffin
26 S. O'Sullivan
27 N. Kennelly
28 J. Cronin
29 B. Sheehan
30 R. Ó Flatharta

Mayo subs not used

16 F. Ruddy
17 F. Costello (c)
19 D. Munnelly
20 D. Sweeney
21 A. Costello
23 G. Mullins
24 M. McNicholas
26 B. J. Padden
28 A. O'Malley
29 B. Ruane
