= 2006 All-Ireland Senior Football Championship final =

2006 All-Ireland Football Championship final
- Event: 2006 All-Ireland Senior Football Championship
Kerry	Mayo
4–15 (27)	3–5 (14)
- Date: 17 September 2006
- Venue: Croke Park, Dublin
- Referee: Brian Crowe (Cavan)
- Attendance: 82,289

The 2006 All-Ireland Senior Football Championship final was the 119th All-Ireland Final and the deciding match of the 2006 All-Ireland Senior Football Championship, an inter-county Gaelic football tournament for the top teams in Ireland.

== Match ==
=== Summary ===
Kerry won by 13 points, the widest winning margin in an All-Ireland SFC final since 1978.

Mayo were hoping to bridge a gap that stretched back to their All-Ireland SFC title winning team of 1951. They failed yet again, having lost to Kerry in 2004 and 1997, Meath in 1996 and Cork in 1989.

Mayo were 2–4 down with no score after 13 minutes; the Kerry total of 4–15 was the highest in a final since Dublin's 5–12 total against Armagh in the 1977 final; in 2022, Martin Breheny listed it among "five of the worst" All-Ireland SFC finals since 1972, commenting: "Kerry's awesome scoring power against a weak Mayo defence robbed the final of a competitive edge, the basic requirement to make a game entertaining".

=== Details ===
17 September 2006
15:30 (IST)
Final

Kerry	4–15 – 3–5	Mayo
C Cooper, K Donaghy, D O'Sullivan 1–2 each, E Brosnan 1–1, M F Russell, A O'Mahony 0–2 each, S Moynihan, P Galvin, S O'Sullivan 0–1 each	Report	K O'Neill 2–0, P Harte 1–0, C Mortimer 0–3, B J Padden, C McDonald 0–1 each

Croke Park, Dublin
Attendance: 82,289
Referee: Brian Crowe (Cavan)

Kerry
Mayo

Kerry; Green and Yellow Shirts/White shorts/Green Socks	4–15 – 3–5 (final score after 70 minutes)	Mayo; Green and Red shirts/White shorts/Red socks
Manager: Jack O'Connor Team: 1 Diarmuid Murphy (GK); 2 Marc Ó Sé; 3 Michael McCarthy; 4 Tom O'Sullivan; 5 Tomás Ó Sé; 6 Séamus Moynihan (0–1); 7 Aidan O'Mahony (0–2); 8 Darragh Ó Sé; 9 Tommy Griffin; 10 Seán O'Sullivan (0–1); 11 Declan O'Sullivan (1–2) (c); 12 Paul Galvin (0–1); 13 Colm Cooper (1–2); 14 Kieran Donaghy (1–2); 15 Mike Frank Russell (0–2) Substitutes: 17 Eoin Brosnan (1–1) for T. Ó Sé; 18 Darran O'Sullivan for S. O'Sullivan; 19 Éamonn Fitzmaurice for T. Griffin; 20 Bryan Sheehan (0–1) for M. F. Russell; 22 Brendan Guiney for A. O'Mahony	Half-time: 3-8 - 3-2 Competition: All-Ireland Senior Football Championship (Final) Date: 15.30 BST; Sunday, 17 September 2006 Venue: Croke Park, Dublin Attendance: 82,289 Referee: Brian Crowe (Cavan) Match rules: 70 minutes. Replay if scores still level. Maximum of 5 substitutions.	Manager: Mickey Moran Team: 1 David Clarke (GK); 2 Dermot Geraghty; 3 David Heaney (c); 4 Keith Higgins; 5 Aidan Higgins; 6 James Nallen; 7 Peadar Gardiner; 8 Ronan McGarrity; 9 Pat Harte (1–0); 10 Billy Joe Padden (0–1); 11 Ger Brady; 12 Alan Dillon; 13 Kevin O'Neill (2–0); 14 Conor Mortimer (0–3); 15 Ciarán McDonald (0–1) Substitutes: David Brady for J. Nallen; Trevor Mortimer for A. Dillon; Barry Moran for K. O'Neill; Aidan Kilcoyne for B. J. Padden; Andy Moran for P. Gardiner

Kerry subs not used
16 K. Cremin
21 M. Lyons
23 R. O'Connor
24 P. Reidy
25 P. O'Connor
26 K. Young
27 R. Hussey
28 K. O'Leary
29 A. Mac Gearailt
30 A. O'Connell
