= Dublin–Mayo Gaelic football rivalry =

Sports rivalry in Ireland

Dublin-Mayo
- Location: County Dublin; County Mayo
- Teams: Dublin; Mayo
- First meeting: Dublin 0-8 - 1-4 Mayo; 1904 All-Ireland semi-final (13 May 1906)
- Latest meeting: Dublin 0-17 - 0-17 Mayo; 2024 All-Ireland group stage (16 June 2024)

Statistics
- Total meetings: 20
- Most wins: Dublin (12)
- Top scorer: Cillian O'Connor (2-65)
- All-time series: Dublin 12 wins, Mayo 3 wins, Draws 5
- Largest victory: Dublin 2-17 - 0-11 Mayo; 2023 All-Ireland quarter-final (2 July 2023)

The Dublin-Mayo rivalry is a Gaelic football rivalry between Irish county teams Dublin and Mayo, who first played each other in 1906.

Initially, meetings between the two teams were rare, with only seven championship matches taking place between 1906 and 1985. In the modern era, however, it has more recently been considered a significant rivalry in Gaelic games due to the increased frequency of matches between the two teams in the 21st century. Championship matches between the two teams usually take place in the latter stages of the championship and as a result attract high interest.

The rivalry reached its greatest intensity in the 2010s for a variety of reasons: the increased frequency in which the teams competed against each other in high stakes matches, each county having what was considered to being one of their strongest ever teams, the closeness of the matches, the involvement of high-profile players such as Bernard Brogan, Diarmuid Connolly and Philly McMahon for Dublin and Cillian O'Connor, Lee Keegan and Aidan O'Shea for Mayo, and the controversial incidents that have occurred in these matches.

Dublin's home ground is Parnell Park and Mayo's home ground is MacHale Park, however, all of their championship meetings have been held at neutral venues, usually Croke Park.

Dublin have the highest number of Leinster titles and have won 31 All Ireland football championships. In 2020 they became the first county ever to win 6 consecutive All Ireland championships in either Gaelic football or hurling.

Mayo have won the Connacht championship a total of 48 times. They have won the All Ireland football championship 4 times, most recently in 2026.

== History ==
=== 1906–1985: Sporadic encounters, Dublin dominance ===
Championship encounters between Dublin and Mayo were rare in the first 100 years of the GAA Championship. They played each other only 7 times in total during this period. Mayo failed to win any of these games. The closest they came was in 1955 and 1985 when they took Dublin to a replay before losing.

=== 2006: The mill on the hill, Mayo's first win ===
The sides met in the championship for the first time in 21 years in the 2006 All-Ireland Semi-final. There was controversy during the warm-up before the game when Mayo defied tradition by warming-up at the Hill 16 end of Croke Park. Up to this point it had been customary for Dublin to warm-up at that end. Upon seeing Mayo warming-up at the Hill 16 end, Dublin decided to warm up at the Hill 16 end anyway, causing an unusual situation where both teams warmed up at the same end. Mayo's apparent pre-match mind games, which became known as the "mill on the hill" appeared to bother Dublin manager Paul Caffrey who was seen on camera shoulder charging Mayo selector John Morrison before the match.

Mayo started the match strong and scored the first 4 points of the game. Dublin did not score their first point until Conal Keaney scored in the 17th minute. A goal by Keaney 5 minutes later rejuvenated Dublin but a strong finish to the half by Mayo meant that they led at half time by 0-9 to 1-5.

Dublin started the second half strong with a goal by Jason Sherlock within 2 minutes of the restart. After 46 minutes they lead by 2-11 to 0-10 and looked on course to reach the All-Ireland final. However Mayo came back and with the help of a goal by Andy Moran they were level after 55 minutes and took the lead after 57 minutes due to a Conor Mortimer free. Alan Brogan equalised for Dublin before the iconic winning point was kicked by Ciaran McDonald.

The 2006 encounter between the two sides has been regarded by many journalists as being one of the greatest Gaelic football matches of all time.

=== 2012–present: The rivalry reaches its zenith ===
Dublin and Mayo met for the first time in 6 years in the semi-final of the 2012 All-Ireland Senior Football Championship. Dublin went into the game as the reigning All-Ireland champions and were favourites to reach the final however Mayo came in with confidence having beaten Down by 12 points in the quarter final. The first half was pretty even until a late first half rally by Mayo left them going in at half time leading by a score of 0-12 to 0-6. In the second half they extended their lead to 10 points with 20 minutes to go. A spirited comeback by Dublin led to them scoring the next 8 points of the match to reduce the deficit down to 2. With Dublin needing a goal, Mayo adopted a strategy of fouling the Dublin players whenever they got near the goal causing some to accuse them of cynicism. The final point of the match was scored by Mayo's Seamus O'Shea as Mayo recorded an upset 0-19 to 0-16 victory to advance to the final against Donegal. The match proved to be the Dublin manager Pat Gilroy's last match in charge of Dublin as he resigned shortly after Dublin's loss.

Dublin and Mayo met again 12 months later in the 2013 All-Ireland final. The match was highly anticipated due to the attacking play exhibited by both teams and the two teams being regarded as the two best teams in the country. Mayo had knocked out reigning champions Donegal in the quarter-final by trouncing them by 16 points while Dublin under new manager Jim Gavin reached the final be overcoming Kerry in a classic semi-final. The final itself proved to be quite a nervy encounter with many basic errors being made by both sides. Bernard Brogan scored the first goal of the match however Mayo led at half time by 0-8 to 1-4. A strong start to the second half by Dublin led to them leading by 3 points with 20 minutes to go before a goal by Andy Moran levelled the match. Dublin would respond almost immediately with a second goal from Brogan. Dublin were effectively reduced to 13 players for the closing stages of the match after Eoghan O'Gara and Rory O'Carroll became injured after Dublin had already used all of their substitutions. In a reversal of last year's match, Dublin resorted to fouling in order to defend their lead, meaning it was now their turn to be accused of cynicism. Dublin ultimately won by a scoreline of 2-12 to 1-14 to win their 24th All-Ireland title and record their first championship win over Mayo since 1985. The loss for Mayo meant that they had now lost 7 All-Ireland finals in a row starting in 1989.

It was at times unrefereeable. I can’t criticise Joe McQuillan too much.

— Kevin McStay analyses the drawn match in 2015 on The Sunday Game

The two sides would next meet in 2015 at the semi-final stage. The match featured a number of controversial incidents which provoked a great deal of discussion. Incidents that would occur during the match include: an altercation between Cillian O'Connor and Rory O'Carroll which resulted in O'Carroll needing 10 stitches and not returning to the field of play, Philip McMahon appearing to headbutt Aidan O'Shea, and an altercation between Lee Keegan and Diarmuid Connolly which led to Keegan receiving a yellow card and Connolly being sent off having been adjudged to have punched Keegan. The unequal punishment given to Keegan and Connolly enraged Dublin fans while Mayo fans would accuse McMahon of feigning injury later in the match. Referee Joe McQuillan came in for criticism for his performance from both sets of fans however he also received a lot of sympathy from neutral viewers due to the difficulty it was to referee such a match. Dublin looked to be on course for victory having led 2-12 to 0-11 after 62 minutes but failed to score for the rest of the match. Mayo came back to score 1-4 and level the match at 2-12 to 1-15. Stephen Cluxton missed a long range free kick which would have won it for Dublin and the match ended in a draw. The replay was scheduled for the following Saturday.

Due to the dramatic events of the drawn match, the replay was highly anticipated. The music festival Electric Picnic was on at the same time as the replay and due to overwhelming demand the festival broke with tradition and allowed the match to be broadcast on two large screens at the festival. The build-up to the replay was dominated by Diarmuid Connolly appealing his suspension after receiving a red card in the drawn match which resulted in a one match ban. He looked set to miss the replay after the ban was upheld by the Central Hearings Committee on the Tuesday before the match until a final appeal to the Central Appeals Committee resulted in him being cleared to play. Connolly only found out that he was cleared to play at 2AM on the morning of the match. In contrast to the unsavoury events of the drawn match, the replay was a much more attractive game and a high scoring first half resulted in the sides going in level at half time at 0-10 each. The rate of scoring slowed down in the second half and a strong start by Mayo meant that they led by 1-12 to 0-11 with just over 15 minutes to go. Lee Keegan had a chance to increase the lead to 5 but his effort fell short. An incredible next ten minutes for Dublin saw them score 2-3 without reply to go from 4 points down to 5 points up. A third Dublin goal by Kevin McManamon ensured a Dublin victory and the final score ended Dublin 3-15 Mayo 1-14. Dublin would go on to defeat Kerry in the final.

Dublin and Mayo would face each other again in 2016. This time in the All-Ireland final. Dublin advanced to the final by beating Kerry in the semi-final while Mayo overcame Tipperary in the other semi final. There was a minor scuffle between the two sides in the tunnel before the match. Dublin had been due to run out onto the pitch first however their delayed entrance caused the two teams to run out at the same time which resulted in the two sets of players pushing and shoving each other in the tunnel. Mayo started the final stronger and went 2 points up early on but conceded two own goals in the first half to allow Dublin to lead. A Dublin player did not score in the match until the 31st minute when Dean Rock scored from a free kick. Dublin would finish the first half leading 2-4 to 0-5. Mayo started the second half strong and were level after 45 minutes. Like many Dublin-Mayo matches, there were a number of off the ball incidents and the personal duel between Diarmuid Connolly and Lee Keegan had many flashpoints. An altercation between the pair after 61 minutes led to both of them receiving yellow cards. Dublin led by 3 points after a point by Connolly in the 69th minute however 3 late points by Mayo led to the match ending in a draw. The equalising point was scored by Cillian O'Connor in the 7th minute of injury time. The final score was Dublin 2-9 Mayo 0-15 and was the first All-Ireland football final to end in a draw since 2000. The final score was unusual for a drawn match in that, taking own goals into account, 21 of the 30 points were scored by players of one team. The replay was scheduled for two weeks later.

In the build up to the replay a number of ex-Dublin players spoke in the media highlighting what they felt was the illegal way Lee Keegan was marking Diarmuid Connolly. Ger Brennan, Paul Clarke and Alan Brogan all spoke about the need for the officials to be watchful of Keegan. This caused many in Mayo to accuse Dublin of trying to influence the referee before the game, something that was rejected by Dublin manager Jim Gavin. In the aftermath of the match, Mayo manager Stephen Rochford would also accuse Dublin of an orchestrated media campaign against Keegan. Dublin started the replay much stronger and were 3 points up after 5 minutes. After 16 minutes Dublin led by 0-6 to 0-4 before a goal by Keegan put Mayo one point up. Dublin would regain the lead before half time and would go in leading 0-10 to 1-6. On the stroke of half time there would be a scuffle between a number of players from both sides leading to Diarmuid Connolly, Donal Vaughan and John Small all being yellow carded. By this stage both Lee Keegan and Jonny Cooper had already received a black card each earlier in the match. In the second half, Mayo had levelled the match by the 39th minute before Mayo goalkeeper Rob Hennelly gave away a penalty for a foul on Paddy Andrews. Hennelly was black carded as a result of the foul and Connolly converted the penalty to give Dublin a 3 point lead. Dublin still led by a point heading into injury time. Late into injury time, Mayo's point scoring hero from the first match, O'Connor, had an opportunity to level the match and send the game into extra time, but his 44 yd (40 m) free kick missed the target and went wide. The win ensured that Dublin retained the cup for the first time since 1977.

This is beyond cruelty - this is sadism at its worst.

— Former Mayo player Martin Carney's reaction towards the end of the 2017 match upon realising that Mayo were about to narrowly lose yet another All-Ireland final. Carney had been providing radio commentary for the match for MidWest Radio

Dublin and Mayo met each other once again in the 2017 All-Ireland final. This meeting made it their 7th championship meeting in 6 years, a record for two counties from different provinces. This was also the first time that the final was a repeat of the previous year's final since 1988 when Meath played Cork in the final for the second consecutive year. There was quite a difference between each team's route to the final. Dublin easily won the Leinster Championship and played five matches in total to reach the final with their smallest winning margin being 9 points. Mayo on the other hand played a record equaling nine matches in total including two replays and two matches going to extra time. Within 90 seconds of the match starting, Dublin took a definitive lead as Con O'Callaghan scored a goal when he ran at the Mayo defence before shooting low along the ground to the corner of the net at the Hill 16 end. Mayo recovered from the poor start to lead at half time 0-9 to 1-5. In the 47th minute, John Small and Donal Vaughan were both sent off. Small for a foul on Colm Boyle, and Vaughan for a retaliation on Small as a result of the foul. Heading into injury time the scores were level at 1-16 each until Connolly won a free for Dublin. Dean Rock stepped up to take the free. Lee Keegan controversially threw a GPS device at Rock as he took the free, yet the Dubliner was undeterred and converted. Mayo failed to regain possession from the resulting kick-out and Dublin held on to win a third consecutive All-Ireland which lead to calls that they were one of the greatest teams of all time. Meanwhile defeat for Mayo was their ninth consecutive loss in an All-Ireland final. At the All Stars Awards at the end of the year, 7 Dublin and 6 Mayo players were selected in the 15 man All Star team of the year. This combined total of 13 set a record for two teams that played in the All-Ireland final.

The next meeting between the sides would be in the 2019 All-Ireland Semi-Final. Interest in the match was once again high and resulted in a full house of 82,000 attending the match at Croke Park. By contrast, the other semi-final between Kerry and Tyrone attracted an attendance of only 33,848 in the same stadium. Dublin went into the semi-final as pre-match favourites however a strong start by Mayo led to them leading at the break by 0-8 to 0-6. Dublin however upped their game in the second half and scored 2-6 without reply within 15 minutes of the restart to lead by 10 points. Both Dublin goals were scored by Con O'Callaghan. A goal for Mayo by Lee Keegan after 52 minutes was soon cancelled out by a third Dublin goal this time by Brian Fenton. Dublin ultimately won the match by 10 points with the final scoreline being Dublin 3-14 Mayo 1-10.

The sides met once again in the 2020 All-Ireland Final. Due to the impact of COVID-19, the final was held in December with no fans allowed to watch in the stadium. Dublin were once again listed as favourites to beat a much changed Mayo team who were in transition. Dublin scored a goal from the throw-in and rarely looked in trouble. Mayo brought the game back level at the 50 minute with a scoreline of 2-08 to 14 points but a final quarter blitz from Dublin where they outscored Mayo by 6 points to 1 point meant they ran out 5 point winners.

The next meeting between the sides would be in the 2021 All-Ireland Semi-Final. Interest in the match was once again high with questions over Dublin and their unconvincing performances in the Leinster Championship. Unlike 2020, fans were allowed into the stadium to watch and in front of 24,000. Dublin started strong, leading by 0-10 to 0-04 at the interval. Mayo came back fighting in the 2nd Half and put 3 points over the bar without reply. Towards the end of stoppage time, Dublin led by only a single point. Robbie Hennelly put over a free to put the game to extra time. Dublin scored another point while Mayo scored 4 more points to leave it as 0-17 0-14 and Mayo had bought the 6 year reign of Dublin as All-Ireland Champions to an end, however they once again failed to win in the final, meaning the result is largely forgotten.

In 2023, the sides met at the earliest stage they ever have in the championship when they faced each other in the quarter-final. Dublin took over the game in the early stages of the second half with a flurry of scores, and ultimately ran out 2-17 to 0-11 winners.

== All-time results ==
=== Legend ===
Dublin win
Mayo win
Match was a draw

=== Senior ===
No.	Date	Winners	Score	Runners-up	Venue	Stage
1.	13 May 1906	Dublin	0-8 - 1-4	Mayo	Athlone Sportsfield	All-Ireland semi-final
2.	17 June 1923	Dublin	1-9 - 0-2	Mayo	Croke Park	All-Ireland final
3.	18 May 1924	Dublin	1-6 - 1-2	Mayo	Croke Park	All-Ireland semi-final
4.	21 August 1955	Dublin	0-7 - 1-4	Mayo	Croke Park	All-Ireland semi-final
5.	11 September 1955	Dublin	1-8 - 1-7	Mayo	Croke Park	All-Ireland semi-final replay
6.	18 August 1985	Dublin	1-13 - 1-13	Mayo	Croke Park	All-Ireland semi-final
7.	8 September 1985	Dublin	2-12 - 1-7	Mayo	Croke Park	All-Ireland semi-final replay
8.	27 August 2006	Mayo	1-16 - 2-12	Dublin	Croke Park	All-Ireland semi-final
9.	2 September 2012	Mayo	0-19 - 0-16	Dublin	Croke Park	All-Ireland semi-final
10.	22 September 2013	Dublin	2-12 - 1-14	Mayo	Croke Park	All-Ireland final
11.	30 August 2015	Dublin	2-12 - 1-15	Mayo	Croke Park	All-Ireland semi-final
12.	5 September 2015	Dublin	3-15 - 1-14	Mayo	Croke Park	All-Ireland semi-final replay
13.	18 September 2016	Dublin	2-09 - 0-15	Mayo	Croke Park	All-Ireland Final
14.	1 October 2016	Dublin	1-15 - 1-14	Mayo	Croke Park	All-Ireland Final Replay
15.	17 September 2017	Dublin	1-17 - 1-16	Mayo	Croke Park	All-Ireland Final
16.	10 August 2019	Dublin	3-14 - 1-10	Mayo	Croke Park	All-Ireland semi-final
17.	19 December 2020	Dublin	2-14 - 0-15	Mayo	Croke Park	All-Ireland final
18.	14 August 2021	Mayo	0-17 - 0-14	Dublin	Croke Park	All-Ireland semi-final
19.	2 July 2023	Dublin	2-17 - 0-11	Mayo	Croke Park	All-Ireland quarter-final
20.	16 June 2024	Dublin	0-17 - 0-17	Mayo	Dr. Hyde Park	All-Ireland Senior Championship group stage
