= Kerry–Mayo Gaelic football rivalry =

Sports rivalry in Ireland

Kerry-Mayo
- Location: County Kerry; County Mayo
- Teams: Kerry; Mayo
- First meeting: Kerry 2-7 -0-4 Mayo; 1903 All-Ireland semi-final (7 May 1905)
- Latest meeting: Mayo 1-20 - 1-17 Kerry; 2026 All-Ireland final (26 July 2026)

Statistics
- Total meetings: 31
- Most wins: Kerry (20)
- Most player appearances: Andy Moran (9)
- Top scorer: Cillian O'Connor (4-32)
- All-time series: Kerry 20 wins, Mayo 7 wins, Draws 4
- Largest victory: Kerry 2-19 - 1-6 Mayo; 1981 All-Ireland semi final (9 August 1981)

The Kerry-Mayo rivalry is a Gaelic football rivalry between Irish county teams Kerry and Mayo, who first played each other in 1905. It is considered to be one of the biggest rivalries in Gaelic games. Kerry's home ground is Fitzgerald Stadium and Mayo's home ground is MacHale Park, however, all but one of their championship meetings have been held at neutral venues, usually Croke Park. The first championship meeting between the two counties to take place in either Kerry or Mayo was in 2019 when they played each other in Fitzgerald Stadium at the All-Ireland quarter-final group stage.

While Kerry have the highest number of Munster Senior Football Championship titles and Mayo are the standard bearers in Connacht, they have also enjoyed All-Ireland Senior Football Championship successes, having won 43 championship titles between them to date.
They have met 31 times with Kerry winning 20 times, Mayo winning 7 times, with 4 Draws

== All-time results ==
=== Legend ===
Kerry win
Mayo win
Match was a draw

=== Senior ===
No.	Date	Winners	Score	Runners-up	Venue	Stage
1.	7 May 1905	Kerry	2-7 - 0-4	Mayo	Limerick	All-Ireland semi final
2.	14 February 1909	Kerry	2-4 - 0-1	Mayo	Limerick	All-Ireland semi final
3.	21 November 1909	Kerry	2-12 - 0-6	Mayo	Ennis	All-Ireland semi final
4.	21 August 1910	Kerry	1-7 - 0-4	Mayo	Tuam	All-Ireland semi final
5.	7 December 1924	Kerry	1-4 - 0-1	Mayo	Croke Park	All-Ireland semi final
6.	18 August 1929	Kerry	3-8 - 1-1	Mayo	Roscommon	All-Ireland semi final
7.	24 August 1930	Kerry	1-9 - 0-4	Mayo	Roscommon	All-Ireland semi final
8.	30 August 1931	Kerry	1-6 - 1-4	Mayo	Tuam	All-Ireland semi final
9.	25 September 1932	Kerry	2-7 - 2-4	Mayo	Croke Park	All-Ireland final
10.	9 August 1936	Mayo	1-5 - 0-6	Kerry	Croke Park	All-Ireland semi final
11.	13 August 1939	Kerry	0-4 - 0-4	Mayo	Croke Park	All-Ireland semi final
12.	11 September 1939	Kerry	3-8 - 1-4	Mayo	Croke Park	All-Ireland semi final replay
13.	29 August 1948	Mayo	0-13 - 0-3	Kerry	Croke Park	All-Ireland semi final
14.	12 August 1951	Kerry	1-5 - 1-5	Mayo	Croke Park	All-Ireland semi final
15.	9 September 1951	Mayo	2-4 - 1-5	Kerry	Croke Park	All-Ireland semi final replay
16.	10 August 1969	Kerry	0-14 - 1-10	Mayo	Croke Park	All-Ireland semi final
17.	9 August 1981	Kerry	2-19 - 1-6	Mayo	Croke Park	All-Ireland semi final
18.	11 August 1996	Mayo	2-13 - 1-10	Kerry	Croke Park	All-Ireland semi final
19.	28 September 1997	Kerry	0-13 - 1-7	Mayo	Croke Park	All-Ireland final
20.	26 September 2004	Kerry	1-20 - 2-9	Mayo	Croke Park	All-Ireland final
21.	7 August 2005	Kerry	2-15 - 0-18	Mayo	Croke Park	All-Ireland quarter final
22.	17 September 2006	Kerry	4-15 - 3-5	Mayo	Croke Park	All-Ireland final
23.	21 August 2011	Kerry	1-20 - 1-11	Mayo	Croke Park	All-Ireland semi final
24.	24 August 2014	Kerry	1-16 - 1-16	Mayo	Croke Park	All-Ireland semi final
25.	30 August 2014	Kerry	3-16 - 3-13	Mayo	Gaelic Grounds	All-Ireland semi final replay
26.	20 August 2017	Mayo	2-14 - 2-14	Kerry	Croke Park	All-Ireland semi final
27.	26 August 2017	Mayo	2-16 - 0-17	Kerry	Croke Park	All-Ireland semi final replay
28.	14 July 2019	Kerry	1-22 - 0-15	Mayo	Fitzgerald Stadium	All-Ireland quarter final group stage
29.	27 June 2022	Kerry	1-18 - 0-13	Mayo	Croke Park	All-Ireland quarter final
30.	20 May 2023	Mayo	1-19 - 0-17	Kerry	Fitzgerald Stadium	All-Ireland quarter final group stage
31.	26 July 2026	Mayo	1-20 - 1-17	Kerry	Croke Park	All-Ireland final
