= Brian Crowe (referee) =

Gaelic football referee

Personal information
- Born: 1957/1958
- Occupation: Defence Forces
- Years active: c. 1970s–present
- Employer: GAA

Sport
- Sport: Gaelic football
- Position: Referee
- Club: Cavan Gaels

Brian Crowe (born 1957/1958) is a Gaelic football All-Ireland Final referee. He is a member of the Cavan Gaels club.

Crowe played midfield and centre-forward for Cavan Gaels before retiring at the start of his twenties so that he could take up refereeing. He refereed the 2000 Connacht Senior Football Championship final, the 2003 Munster Senior Football Championship final. Club games refereed included the 2003 and 2005 All-Ireland Senior Club Football Championship finals and two Ulster Senior Club Football Championship finals. In 2006, he tipped David Coldrick (Meath), Derek Fahy (Longford) and Maurice Deegan (Laois) to referee All-Ireland finals. By 2006 he had done 13 years of service to the inter-county panel.

He refereed the 2006 All-Ireland Senior Football Championship Final between Kerry and Mayo. He was the second Cavanman to referee an All-Ireland final, following Fintan Tierney of Butlersbridge (who did the 1972 final) and the last until Joe McQuillan's first final in 2011. In the 2008 All-Ireland Senior Football Championship he became involved in a dispute with the CCC, but officials said he was not being punished for refusing to co-operate.

Part of the Defence Forces, he is a married father of three daughters and a son. He is interested in snooker and athletics and plays badminton.
