= Greg Maher =

Irish Gaelic footballer

Personal information
- Native name: Gréagóir Ó Meachair (Irish)
- Born: 14 May 1967 Claremorris, County Mayo, Ireland
- Died: 15 September 2016 (aged 49) Dublin, Ireland
- Occupation: Factory worker
- Height: 6 ft 2 in (188 cm)

Sport
- Sport: Gaelic football
- Position: Right wing-forward
Club
- Years: Club
- Claremorris
Club titles
- Mayo titles: 0
Inter-county
Years	County	Apps (scores)
1988–1990	Mayo	3 (0–00)
Inter-county titles
- Connacht titles: 1
- All-Irelands: 0

Greg Maher (14 May 1967 – 15 September 2016) was an Irish Gaelic footballer who played as a right wing-forward at senior level for the Mayo county team.

Maher, played in Mayo's 1989 All-Ireland final loss to Cork, their first since 1951. He also won a minor All-Ireland medal in 1985.
