= 1989 All-Ireland Senior Football Championship final =

- Event: 1989 All-Ireland Senior Football Championship
Cork	Mayo
0–17 (17)	1–11 (14)
- Date: 17 September 1989
- Venue: Croke Park, Dublin
- Referee: Paddy Collins (Westmeath)
- Attendance: 65,519

The 1989 All-Ireland Senior Football Championship final was a Gaelic football match played at Croke Park on 17 September 1989 to determine the winners of the 1989 All-Ireland Senior Football Championship, the 103rd season of the All-Ireland Senior Football Championship, a tournament organised by the Gaelic Athletic Association for the champions of the four provinces of Ireland. The final was contested by Mayo of Connacht and Cork of Munster, with Cork winning by 0–17 to 1–11.

== Match ==
=== Summary ===
In what is regarded as one of the best and most entertaining finals of its era, the Cork and Mayo All-Ireland decider provided "great fun at a time when football badly needed some". Cork entered the game hoping to avoid the unwanted accolade of becoming the first team in almost fifty years to lose three successive All-Ireland finals. Inspired by this they got off to a great start with three quick points before Mayo settled into the match. At half time Cork led by 0–10 to 0–8.

Mayo were rejuvenated after the interval. An Anthony Finnerty goal in the 38th minute gave Mayo a brief lead. Finnerty's goal looked as though it might swing the tide in Mayo's favour. Cork hit back to equalize through Dave Barry and a brace of scores from John Cleary handed the Rebels the initiative. Mayo's Noel Durkan set Finnerty free again minutes later, however, in a key turning point of the game, he planted his shot into the side-netting. Mayo failed to score for the last sixteen minutes as Mick McCarthy and Teddy McCarthy kicked over the final points of the game.

Cork's All-Ireland SFC victory was their first since 1973. The win gave them their fifth All-Ireland title over all and put them joint fourth on the all-time roll of honour along with Meath, Cavan and Wexford. It was the final match for captain Dinny Allen, who before the match had a reputation as one of the great "nearly men" of Gaelic games. He was dropped from the panel for the 1973 season allegedly as punishment for spending the winter playing soccer for Cork Hibs, and as a dual player his final inter-county hurling appearance came in 1975, the year before Cork won three straight All-Ireland titles.

The team Mayo selected for the 1989 All-Ireland SFC final was full of players more accustomed to the role of midfielder than anything else, e.g. T. J. Kilgallon at centre-back and Greg Maher at wing-forward.

Mayo were appearing in their first All-Ireland SFC final since they triumphed in 1951. Defeat at the hands of Cork was the first of eleven All-Ireland defeats along two draws from thirteen final appearances between 1989 and 2021.

=== Details ===
17 September 1989
15:15 IST

Mayo	1–11 - 0–17	Cork
M Fitzmaurice 0–7, A Finnerty 1–0, K McStay 0–2, L McHale 0–1, WJ Padden 0–1		L Tompkins 0–4, P McGrath 0–3, J Cleary 0–3, D Barry 0–3, T McCarthy 0–2, M McCarthy 0–2

Croke Park, Dublin
Attendance: 65,519
Referee: Paddy Collins (Westmeath)

Mayo	Cork

==== Cork ====
- 1 J. Kerins
- 2 N. Cahalane
- 3 S. O'Brien
- 4 J. Kerrigan
- 5 M. Slocum
- 6 C. Counihan
- 7 T. Davis
- 8 T. McCarthy
- 9 S. Fahy
- 10 D. Barry
- 11 L. Tompkins
- 12 B. Coffey
- 13 P. McGrath
- 14 D. Allen (c)
- 15 J. Cleary

Subs used
21 J. O'Driscoll for B. Coffey
20 M. McCarthy for S. Fahy
19 D. Culloty for J. Cleary

Subs not used
16 M. Maguire
17 T. Nation
18 D. Walsh
22 M. Burns
23 C. O'Neill
24 E. O'Mahony

Manager
B. Morgan

==== Mayo ====
- 1 G. Irwin
- 2 J. Browne
- 3 P. Ford
- 4 D. Flanagan
- 5 M. Collins
- 6 T. J. Kilgallon
- 7 J. Finn
- 8 S. Maher
- 9 L. McHale
- 10 G. Maher
- 11 W. J. Padden
- 12 N. Durkin
- 13 M. Fitzmaurice
- 14 J. Burke
- 15 K. McStay

Subs used
18 A. Finnerty for J. Burke
20 R. Dempsey for S. Maher
22 B. Kilkelly for G. Maher

Subs not used
16 E. Lavin
17 D. Kearney
19 M. Feeney
21 M. Carney
23 P. Holmes
24 T. Grady

Manager
J. O'Mahony
