= 1953–54 National Football League (Ireland) =

23 staging of the Gaelic football tournament

League details
- Dates: 11 October 1953 – 9 May 1954

League champions
- Winners: Mayo (9th win)
- Captain: Pádraig Carney

League runners-up
- Runners-up: Carlow
- Captain: Billy McGuill

The 1953–54 National Football League was the 23rd staging of the National Football League (NFL), an annual Gaelic football tournament for the Gaelic Athletic Association county teams of Ireland.

Carlow reached their only final to date, and opened well, leading Mayo by 0-2 to 0-1 after ten minutes. But then the 'flying doctor' Pádraig Carney, who came home from America for the game, levelled before Tommy Langan punched a goal from a Carney centre in the 26th minute. Mayo's second goal from M. Flanagan in the 10th minute of the second-half ended Carlow's dreams of National League glory, and gave Mayo their ninth NFL win.

== Format ==
Teams are placed into Divisions I, II, III and IV. The top team in each division reaches the semi-finals.

== Results ==
=== Division I ===
Carlow won, ahead of Kerry, Cork, Wexford, Kildare, Waterford and Tipperary.

=== Division II ===
Armagh won

=== Division III ===
Mayo won, finishing ahead of Longford, Westmeath, Sligo, Leitrim, Meath and Cavan.

=== Division IV ===
Dublin won

=== Finals ===
11 April 1954
Semi-Final

Carlow	1-10 – 1-7	Armagh
Ned Doogue goal		Mal McEvoy goal (pen)

Croke Park, Dublin

25 April 1954
Semi-Final

Mayo	0-11 – 0-7	Dublin
P Carney 0-7 (4f, 1 '50'); T Langan 0-3; D O'Neill 0-1

Croke Park, Dublin

9 May 1954
Final

Mayo	2-10 – 0-3	Carlow
T Langan 1-4; P Carney 0-4 (2f); M Flanagan 1-1; E Mongey 0-1		Ned Doogue 0-3 (3f)

Croke Park, Dublin
Attendance: 38,694
Referee: Sean Hayes (Tipperary)
