= T. J. Kilgallon =

Mayo Gaelic footballer

Personal information
- Native name: T. S. Mac Giolla Chaillín (Irish)
- Born: 26 June 1961 (age 65) Lacken, County Mayo, Ireland
- Occupation: Teacher
- Height: 6 ft 1 in (185 cm)

Sport
- Sport: Gaelic football
- Position: Centre-back
Club
- Years: Club
- Balla
Club titles
- Mayo titles: 0
Inter-county*
Years	County	Apps (scores)
1980–1993	Mayo	32 (0–19)
Inter-county titles
- Connacht titles: 6
- All-Irelands: 0
- NFL: 0
- All Stars: 1
- *Inter County team apps and scores correct as of 22:54, 13 November 2016.

T. J. Kilgallon (born 26 June 1961) is an Irish former Gaelic footballer. His league and championship career at senior level with the Mayo county team lasted fourteen seasons from 1980 until 1993.

== Career statistics ==
Team	Season	Connacht		All-Ireland		Total	
Team	Season	Apps	Score	Apps	Score	Apps	Score
Mayo	1980	3	0–1	0	0–0	3	0–1
Mayo	1981	0	0–0	0	0–0	0	0–0
Mayo	1982	2	0–1	0	0–0	2	0–1
Mayo	1983	3	0–4	0	0–0	3	0–4
Mayo	1984	0	0–0	0	0–0	0	0–0
Mayo	1985	2	0–0	2	0–3	4	0–3
Mayo	1986	1	0–3	0	0–0	1	0–3
Mayo	1987	2	0–0	0	0–0	2	0–0
Mayo	1988	3	0–2	1	0–0	4	0–2
Mayo	1989	2	0–1	2	0–0	4	0–1
Mayo	1990	0	0–0	0	0–0	0	0–0
Mayo	1991	3	0–1	0	0–0	3	0–1
Mayo	1992	3	0–3	1	0–0	4	0–3
Mayo	1993	2	0–0	0	0–0	2	0–0
Total		26	0-16	6	0-3	32	0-19

== Honours ==
Mayo

- Connacht Senior Football Championship (6): 1981, 1985, 1988, 1989, 1992, 1993
- Connacht Under-21 Football Championship (1): 1980
- All-Ireland Minor Football Championship (1): 1978
- Connacht Minor Football Championship (2): 1978, 1979 (c)

Sporting positions
Preceded by Henry Gavin	Mayo Senior Football Captain; 1985	Succeeded by
