= Liam McHale =

Football coach

Personal information
- Native name: Liam MacCeile (Irish)
- Born: 1 June 1965 (age 61) Ballina, County Mayo, Ireland
- Occupation: Football manager
- Height: 6 ft 5 in (196 cm)

Sport
- Sport: Gaelic football, basketball
- Position: Midfield/Full-forward
Club
- Years: Club
- ?–2004: Ballina Stephenites
Club titles
- Mayo titles: 6
Inter-county
- Years: County
- 1985–1999: Mayo
Inter-county titles
- Connacht titles: 8
- All-Irelands: 0
- All Stars: 1

Liam McHale (born 1 June 1965) is a Gaelic football coach and former player (and basketball player) who played in midfield with the Mayo county football team between 1985 and 1999.

He played from the start in four finals of the All-Ireland Senior Football Championship (including one replay), but was never successful in winning the All-Ireland Senior Football Championship.

== Football career ==
McHale started the 1989 All-Ireland Senior Football Championship final, which was won narrowly by Cork.

He started the 1996 All-Ireland Senior Football Championship final. It ended in a draw and a replay followed. Meath defeated Mayo, avenging their defeat to the same opposition in the 1951 decider. McHale was sent off, along with Meath's Colm Coyle. He had been man of the match in the drawn game. However, he did win an All Star award later that year.

McHale started the 1997 All-Ireland Senior Football Championship final, in which Mayo was defeated by Kerry.

== Basketball career ==
McHale won two national basketball Cups with his club Ballina (in 1991 and 1996), as well as a Super League title.

== Coaching career ==
McHale was a Gaelic football selector on the Mayo team that reached the 2004 All-Ireland Senior Football Championship final, which Mayo lost to Kerry.

In 2013, McHale was involved in coaching the successful St Brigid's GAA team which won the All-Ireland Senior Club Football Championship, under manager Kevin McStay.

In October 2014, it was announced McHale would join the Cavan backroom team.

McHale also served as a selector of the Roscommon GAA squad which won the 2017 Connacht Senior Football Championship. However, his charges were heavily defeated in an All-Ireland quarter-final replay against his native Mayo.

In December 2019, Westmeath GAA club Athlone confirmed that McHale would be its new senior manager.

After Kevin McStay was appointed as manager of the Mayo senior team in 2022, McStay named him as a coach and selector. He departed the setup after a year.

On 7 November 2023 he was hired as the new manager of the Mayo ladies football team on a three-year contract.

== Personal life ==
As of 2018, McHale was living in Carrentrilla in Ballina, County Mayo.

Awards and achievements
Preceded by ? (?)	All-Ireland SFC Final; Man of the Match; 1996 (Drawn Game)	Succeeded by ? ? (Replay)
