= Jimmy Browne =

Mayo Gaelic footballer

Personal information
- Native name: Séamus de Brún (Irish)
- Born: 29 July 1960 (age 66) Castlebar, County Mayo, Ireland
- Occupation: Printer
- Height: 5 ft 9 in (175 cm)

Sport
- Sport: Gaelic football
- Position: Corner back
Club
- Years: Club
- Ballina Stephenites
Club titles
- Mayo titles: 3
- Connacht titles: 2
- All-Ireland Titles: 1
Inter-county
Years	County	Apps (scores)
1984–1990	Mayo	52 (0–1)
Inter-county titles
- Connacht titles: 2
- All Stars: 1

James Browne (born 29 July 1960) is an Irish former sportsman. He played Gaelic football for his local club Ballina Stephenites and was a member of the senior Mayo county team from 1986 until 1990. Browne captained Mayo in the 1989 All-Ireland Senior Football Championship final, and was afterwards selected on the GAA All Star team of the year.
