= Pat Kelly (Gaelic footballer) =

Irish Gaelic footballer

Personal information
- Native name: Pádraig Ó Ceallaigh (Irish)
- Born: 10 July 1981 (age 45) Castlebar, Republic of Ireland
- Occupation: Garda

Sport
- Sport: Gaelic football
- Position: Left half back
Club
- Years: Club
- St Vincents
Club titles
- Dublin titles: 1
- Leinster titles: 1
- All-Ireland Titles: 1
Inter-county
- Years: County
- 2004–: Mayo
Inter-county titles
- Leinster titles: 2

Pat Kelly is a Gaelic footballer, formerly for the Mayo county team, and currently for St Vincents. He won a Dublin Senior Football Championship title with St Vincents in 2007. Kelly then went on to win the Leinster Senior Club Football Championship final against Tyrrellspass of Westmeath. Kelly won the 2008 All-Ireland Senior Club Football Championship with St Vincents in a hard-fought game.
