= Anthony Egan =

Gaelic footballer

Anthony Egan is a former Gaelic footballer and manager with the Mayo county football team. He played defence and midfield back. He got a shoulder injury in 1981. Egan was proposed to take up the mantle as Mayo manager in 2010, but was reportedly rejected as too old for the job.
