= Moygownagh GAA =

Gaelic games club in County Mayo, Ireland

Moygownagh
- CLG Maith Gamhnach
- Founded: 1979
- County: Mayo
- Colours: Maroon and Green
- Grounds: Moygownagh, County Mayo
- Coordinates: 54.1655°N 9.3463°W

Playing kits
Standard colours

Senior Club Championships
	All Ireland	Connacht champions	Mayo champions
Football:	-	-	0

Moygownagh GAA (Irish: CLG Maith Gamhnach) is a Gaelic football club in Moygownagh, County Mayo in Ireland. It was established in 1979.

== Notable players ==
- Anthony Finnerty
