= Alan Costello =

Irish Gaelic footballer

Personal information
- Born: County Mayo, Ireland

Sport
- Sport: Gaelic football
- Position: Centre forward
Clubs
- Years: Club
- Balla, Mayo Boston, Young Irelands Sydney
Inter-county
- Years: County
- 2004-2005: Mayo; Sligo
Inter-county titles
- Connacht titles: 1 Senior, U 21, Minor, Junior
- All Stars: gpa nomination 2010

Alan Costello is a Gaelic footballer from County Mayo. He has played for the Mayo county team and is currently a member of the Sligo county team. He was part of the Mayo team that made it to the 2004 All-Ireland Final but lost to Kerry. He joined up with the Sligo county team after moving to the county. Since then, he has won consecutive National League titles: Div 4 in 2009 and Div 3 in 2010. Receiving a GPA All Star nomination in 2010. He also played for the IT Sligo college team and won Sigerson Cup medals with it in 2004 and 2005.
