= Peter Burke (Gaelic footballer) =

Gaelic football coach, selector and former player

Personal information
- Native name: P. de Burca (Irish)
- Born: 9 November 1976 (age 49)
- Occupation: Roofing business
- Height: 6 ft 0 in (183 cm)

Sport
- Sport: Gaelic football
- Position: Goalkeeper
Club
- Years: Club
- Kiltimagh
Inter-county
Years	County	Apps (scores)
1997–2004	Mayo	60
Inter-county titles
- Connacht titles: 2
- All-Irelands: 0
- NFL: 1
- All Stars: 0

Peter Burke (born 9 November 1976) is a Gaelic football coach, selector and former player. He played as goalkeeper for the Kiltimagh club and the Mayo county team.

Burke made 60 appearances for his county between 1997 and 2004. He played in the 1997 All-Ireland Senior Football Championship final defeat to Kerry. He did not concede a goal in that game but he did in the 2004 All-Ireland Senior Football Championship final, against Kerry again, another loss. He won two Connacht Senior Football Championships, in 1997 and 1999, as well as the 2000–01 National Football League. He was also involved with the Ireland international rules football team as a player.

After Burke had retired from playing inter-county football, Mayo manager James Horan invited him to be Mayo's senior goalkeeping coach, a role Burke held for eight years (between 2011 and 2018), coaching his former understudy David Clarke. Stephen Rochford then appointed Burke as a selector ahead of the 2017 season.

A hurler at youth level, he is a nephew of former Mayo goalkeeper Eugene Lavin. He is originally from the townland of Cloondace (near Knock), is married with children, and has a roofing business.
