= Noel Durkin =

Mayo Gaelic footballer

Personal information
- Native name: Nollaig Mac Dhuarcáin (Irish)
- Born: 25 December 1963 (age 62) Ballaghaderreen, County Roscommon, Ireland
- Occupation: Site manager
- Height: 6 ft 0 in (183 cm)

Sport
- Sport: Gaelic football
- Position: Left wing-forward
Club
- Years: Club
- Ballaghaderreen
Club titles
- Mayo titles: 0
Inter-county*
Years	County	Apps (scores)
1985–1993	Mayo	27 (8–20)
Inter-county titles
- Connacht titles: 5
- All-Irelands: 0
- NFL: 0
- All Stars: 1
- *Inter County team apps and scores correct as of 19:54, 15 November 2016.

Noel Durkin (born 25 December 1963) is an Irish former Gaelic footballer. His league and championship career at senior level with the Mayo county team spanned ten seasons from 1983 until 1993.

== Career statistics ==
Team	Season	Connacht		All-Ireland		Total	
Team	Season	Apps	Score	Apps	Score	Apps	Score
Mayo	1985	2	1–3	2	1–1	4	2–4
Mayo	1986	2	0–3	0	0–0	2	0–3
Mayo	1987	2	0–2	0	0–0	2	0–2
Mayo	1988	3	0–4	1	0–1	4	0–5
Mayo	1989	3	1–2	2	0–1	5	1–3
Mayo	1990	0	0–0	0	0–0	0	0–0
Mayo	1991	4	4–1	0	0–0	4	4–1
Mayo	1992	2	1–2	1	0–0	3	1–2
Mayo	1993	2	0–0	1	0–0	3	0–0
Total		20	7–17	7	1–3	27	8–20

== Honours ==
Galway

- Connacht Senior Football Championship (5): 1985, 1988, 1989, 1992, 1993
