= Gabriel Irwin =

Mayo Gaelic football goalkeeper

Personal information
- Native name: Gaibriél Ó hEireamhóin (Irish)
- Born: 1 July 1965 (age 61) Glenamoy, County Mayo, Ireland
- Occupation: Sales rep
- Height: 5 ft 10 in (178 cm)

Sport
- Sport: Gaelic football
- Position: Goalkeeper
Club
- Years: Club
- Glenamoy
Club titles
- Mayo titles: 0
College
- Years: College
- Sligo Regional Technical College
College titles
- Sigerson titles: 0
Inter-county
- Years: County
- 1985–1993: Mayo
Inter-county titles
- Connacht titles: 5
- All-Irelands: 0
- NFL: 0
- All Stars: 1

Gabriel Irwin (born 1 July 1965) is an Irish former sportsman. He played Gaelic football with his local club Glenamoy and was a member of the senior Mayo county team from 1983 until 1990.

== Career ==
A shortage of underage activity in Glenamoy resulted in Irwin first playing competitive Gaelic football as a schoolboy with Lacken Cross Vocational School. Here he won consecutive Mayo VSSFC titles as well as a Connacht VSSFC title. Irwin also earned inclusion on the Mayo vocational schools' team and won an All-Ireland VSSFC title in 1982. He later won a Freshers' Cup title with Sligo Regional Technical College.

Irwin first appeared for Mayo as a member of the minor team in 1983, after being overlooked the year before. He was also drafted onto the under-21 team that year and won an All-Ireland U21FC medal. Irwin's four-year tenure with the under-21 also resulted in four successive Connacht U21FC medals. He joined the senior team as reserve goalkeeper in 1985. Irwin later made the starting fifteen and was in goal when Mayo suffered a defeat by Cork in the 1989 All-Ireland final. His performances throughout the season earned him an All-Star. Irwin left the inter-county scene in 1993, by which time he had also claimed five Connacht SFC medals.

== Honours ==
Lacken Cross Vocational School

- Connacht Vocational Schools Senior Football Championship: 1982
- Mayo Vocational Schools Senior Football Championship: 1982, 1983
- Connacht Vocational Schools Junior Football Championship: 1980

Sligo Regional Technical College

- Higher Education Special Freshers Championship: 1984

Mayo

- Connacht Senior Football Championship: 1985, 1988, 1989, 1992, 1993
- All-Ireland Under-21 Football Championship: 1983
- Connacht Under-21 Football Championship: 1983, 1984, 1985, 1986
- All-Ireland Vocational Schools Championship: 1982
