= Pádraig Carney =

Irish Gaelic footballer (1928–2019)

Personal information
- Native name: Pádraig Ó Cearnaigh (Irish)
- Nickname: The Flying Doctor
- Born: 1928 Swinford, County Mayo, Ireland
- Died: 9 June 2019 (aged 91) California
- Occupation: Doctor

Sport
- Sport: Gaelic football
- Position: Midfield
Club
- Years: Club
- 1940s–1950s: Castlebar Mitchels
Club titles
- Mayo titles: 2
Inter-county
Years	County	Apps (scores)
1945–1954	Mayo	25 (2–72)
Inter-county titles
- Connacht titles: 4
- All-Irelands: 2
- NFL: 2

Pádraig Carney (1928 – 9 June 2019) was a Gaelic footballer who played as a centre-forward for the senior Mayo county team.

He was one of the last two living players from the winning 1951 Mayo team, the other being Paddy Prendergast. Carney first played for the senior team while he was still a minor in the 1946 championship and was a regular member of the starting fifteen until his retirement after the National League final in 1954. During that time, he won two All-Ireland medals, four Connacht medals and two National League medals. Carney also had the distinction of being the first player to score a goal from a penalty in an All-Ireland final.

Carney played club football with a range of clubs. However, it was with Castlebar Mitchels that he won two county championship medals.

He died in June 2019, at the age of 91.

== Career statistics ==
Team	Season	Connacht		All-Ireland		Total	
Team	Season	Apps	Score	Apps	Score	Apps	Score
Mayo	1946	3	0-07	0	0-00	3	0-07
Mayo	1947	1	0-00	0	0-00	1	0-00
Mayo	1948	4	0-14	2	1-03	6	1-17
Mayo	1949	3	0-16	1	0-06	4	0-22
Mayo	1950	1	0-04	2	0-01	3	0-05
Mayo	1951	1	0-03	3	0-06	4	0-09
Mayo	1952	2	0-06	0	0-00	2	0-06
Mayo	1953	2	1-06	0	0-00	2	1-06
Total		17	1-56	8	1-16	25	2-72
