= Anthony Finnerty =

Gaelic footballer

Personal information
- Native name: Antóin Ó Fiannachta (Irish)
- Nickname: Larry

Sport
- Sport: Gaelic Football
- Position: Right corner forward
Clubs
- Years: Club
- Moygownagh; An Cheathrú Rua
Inter-county
- Years: County
- 1986–1996: Mayo
Inter-county titles
- Connacht titles: 5

Anthony Finnerty is a former Gaelic football player. He played for Mayo in the 1989 All-Ireland Final and in the 1996 All-Ireland Final. He played from 1986 until 1996.

== Career ==
While he scored the only goal in a game against Cork, the result did not go his way.

== Honours ==
Mayo

- Connacht Senior Football Championship (5): 1988, 1989, 1992, 1993, 1996

An Cheathrú Rua

- Galway Senior Football Championship (1): 1996

== Personal life ==
He is the father of Robert Finnerty, a player for Galway. He is married and based in Salthill, Galway, and runs the family business, Wards Hotel and pub in Lower Salthill with his wife Grania. He is the Ladies' Football manager of the Salthill Knocknacarra GAA Club, captained by his daughter Ailbhe. His 3 sons, Robert, William, and Colm are players on the SKGAA Football team.
