= Willie Joe Padden =

Irish Gaelic footballer

Personal information
- Native name: Liam Seosamh Mac Pháidín (Irish)
- Born: 6 February 1959 (age 67) Belmullet, County Mayo
- Occupation: Auctioneer
- Height: 5 ft 11 in (180 cm)

Sport
- Sport: Gaelic football
- Position: Midfield/centre-half forward
Club
| Years | Club | Apps (scores) |
| 1970s–1994 | Belmullet | Over 100 |
Club titles
- Mayo titles: 1
- Connacht titles: 0
- All-Ireland Titles: 2 Gaeltacht medals
Inter-county
| Years | County | Apps (scores) |
| 1977–1993 | Mayo | 111 ( ? ) |
Inter-county titles
- Connacht titles: 5
- NFL: 1
- All Stars: 2

Willie Joe Padden is a former Gaelic footballer who received two All Stars awards, and represented Mayo in a 1989 All-Ireland SFC Final but lost to Cork. His son Billy Joe also played for Mayo.

Willie Joe was born in Belmullet on 6 February 1959. He attended his local primary school in Aughalsheen just outside Belmullet. He went to the Convent of Mercy secondary school in Belmullet.

== Playing career ==
Padden started playing Gaelic football at age 11, played Minor football for Belmullet GFC at 14 and started playing Senior club championship at the age of 16, joining the Mayo minor panel in the same year. In 1977, in which he turned 18, he played for Mayo at Minor, U21 and Senior levels, including captaining the Mayo minor team to a Connacht title. A year later aged 19 he played in a National Football League final against Dublin in Croke Park.

In his playing career, which ended with his retirement aged 34, Padden won one Minor Connacht title, one U21 Connacht title and five Connacht Senior titles. With Belmullet GFC he won a county league medal and two Gaeltacht medals.

Padden received All Stars in 1985 and 1989. He was also named Mayo footballer of the year twice and Mayo personality of the year in 1990. Songs written about him include the Saw Doctors' "Hay Wrap", which features the line "Will Galway beat Mayo? Not if they have Willie Joe".

Willie Joe was voted 35th best GAA player ever. Ranked second in Mayo behind Tommy Langan. He was also voted 4th best ever midfielder in the Irish Independent newspaper.
