= Ray Dempsey =

Mayo Gaelic footballer

Ray Dempsey is a Gaelic football manager and former player. He was briefly manager of the Limerick county team from 2022 until 2023.

Dempsey played for Mayo in the 1989 and in the 1996 All-Ireland Senior Football Championship Finals. He got 64 appearances out of Mayo over the years and he hit 16–97 so that makes him part of Mayo's top 10 scorers since 1950.

Dempsey was a losing finalist for Mayo again but this time it was in 2022 Hunt. Kevin McStay bet him in the end to take the manager job of him. Oisín McConville hit out at this decision but then McConville was going to be part of Dempsey's management anyway until he went and took himself away of to Wicklow to try his luck there.

A former manager of the mayo minor and under-21 teams, Dempsey was appointed manager of the senior Limerick team on a two-year term, announced on 7 October 2022. He left after five months after overseeing five games. He had allegedly met with the players and selector Mick Fitzgerald replaced him.
