= Billy Joe Padden =

Irish Gaelic footballer

Personal information
- Nickname: BJ
- Born: County Mayo
- Height: 6 ft 0 in (183 cm)

Sport
- Sport: Gaelic football
- Position: Full forward
Clubs
- Years: Club
- 1998-2010 2011-: Bellmullet; Carrickcuppen
Inter-county
Years	County	Apps (scores)
2000-2010 2011-2012	Mayo; Armagh	103-96
Inter-county titles
- Connacht titles: 3
- Ulster titles: 0
- NFL: 1
- All Stars: 0

Billy Joe Padden is a Gaelic footballer from County Mayo, Ireland. He began his playing career with Belmullet GAC and played at all levels for the Mayo county team.

He subsequently moved to County Armagh, joining St Patrick's Carrickcruppen GFC and playing at senior level for the Armagh county team. He is a son of Mayo legend Willie Joe Padden.

He has done media work, including for Off the Ball and Sky Sports.
