= Chris Barrett (Gaelic footballer) =

Mayo Gaelic footballer

Personal information
- Native name: Cristóir Bairéid (Irish)
- Born: 1987 (age 38–39) Castlebar, Ireland
- Occupation: Civil engineer
- Height: 1.78 m (5 ft 10 in)

Sport
- Sport: Gaelic football
- Position: Right corner-back
Clubs
- Years: Club
- –2019 2020–: Belmullet; Clontarf
Inter-county
- Years: County
- 2010–2021: Mayo
Inter-county titles
- Connacht titles: 7
- NFL: 1
- All Stars: 1

Chris Barrett is a Gaelic footballer who plays for Clontarf and, formerly, for the Mayo county team. He previously played for the Belmullet club in Mayo before moving to Dublin.

He started at left corner-back in the 2013 All-Ireland SFC final, which Mayo lost by one point to Dublin.

He received an All Star at the 2017 All Star Awards, when he was named at right corner-back.

He studied at NUI Galway.

Barrett announced his retirement from inter-county in January 2021.
