= Cork–Mayo Gaelic football rivalry =

Sports rivalry in Ireland

Cork-Mayo
- Location: County Cork; County Mayo
- Teams: Cork; Mayo
- First meeting: Cork 4–16 – 0–1 Mayo; 1901 All-Ireland semi-final (17 May 1903)
- Latest meeting: Mayo 0–23 – 0–18 Cork; 2026 All-Ireland quarter-final (27 June 2026)

Statistics
- Total meetings: 14
- Most wins: Cork (7)
- All-time series: Cork 8-5 Mayo

The Cork-Mayo rivalry is a Gaelic football rivalry between Irish county teams Cork and Mayo, who first played each other in 1901. The fixture has been an infrequent one in the history of the championship, and therefore the rivalry is not as intense between the two teams. Cork's home ground is Páirc Uí Chaoimh and Mayo's home ground is MacHale Park, however, all of their championship meetings have been held at neutral venues, usually Croke Park.

While Cork have the second highest number of Munster titles and Mayo are second to Galway in Connact, they have also enjoyed success in the All-Ireland Senior Football Championship, having won 10 championship titles between them to date.

== All-time results ==
=== Legend ===
Cork win
Mayo win
Match was a draw

=== Senior ===
No.	Date	Winners	Score	Runners-up	Venue	Stage
1.	17 May 1903	Cork	4–16 – 0–1	Mayo	Limerick	All Ireland semi-final
2.	8 September 1907	Cork	0–10 – 0–6	Mayo	Limerick	All Ireland semi-final
3.	10 May 1908	Cork	2–10 – 0–2	Mayo	Limerick	All Ireland semi-final
4.	22 October 1916	Mayo	1–2 – 0–2	Cork	Athlone	All Ireland semi-final*
5.	19 November 1916	Mayo	2–10 – 0–2	Cork	Croke Park	All Ireland semi-final replay
6.	17 September 1989	Cork	0–17 – 1–11	Mayo	Croke Park	All Ireland final
7.	15 August 1993	Cork	5–15 – 0–10	Mayo	Croke Park	All Ireland semi-final
8.	22 August 1999	Cork	2–12 – 0–12	Mayo	Croke Park	All Ireland semi-final
9.	5 August 2002	Cork	0–16 – 1–10	Mayo	Croke Park	All Ireland quarter-final
10.	31 July 2011	Mayo	1–13 – 2–6	Cork	Croke Park	All Ireland quarter-final
11.	3 August 2014	Mayo	1–19 – 2–15	Cork	Croke Park	All Ireland quarter-final
12.	22 July 2017	Mayo	0–27 – 2–20	Cork	Limerick	All Ireland qualifier round 4
13.	18 June 2023	Cork	1–14 – 1–11	Mayo	Limerick	All Ireland qualifier round 3
14.	27 June 2026	Mayo	0–23 – 0–18	Cork	Croke Park	All Ireland quarter-final
