= Dermot Flanagan =

Mayo Gaelic footballer

Personal information
- Occupation: Barrister

Sport
- Sport: Gaelic football
- Position: Left corner-back
Club
- Years: Club
- Ballaghaderreen
Inter-county
Years	County	Apps (scores)
1982–1997	Mayo	122
Inter-county titles
- Connacht titles: 7
- All Stars: 2

Dermot Flanagan is a former Gaelic footballer who played for the Mayo county team and received two All Stars awards. He is the son of Irish Minister and Mayo Gaelic footballer Seán Flanagan.

== Playing career ==
Dermot Flanagan began playing for the Mayo Minor team in 1979. He played with the Mayo Senior team for 15 years from 1982–1997. During his Senior career, he won seven Connacht titles.

Flanagan received All Star awards in 1985 and 1989. He is Mayo's second most-capped player (after James Nallen) with 122 appearances.
