= Kieran Cremin =

Irish Gaelic footballer

Personal information
- Born: Killarney, County Kerry

Sport
- Sport: Gaelic football
- Position: Goalkeeper
Club
- Years: Club
- 2001-2011: Dr. Croke's
Club titles
- Kerry titles: 2
- Munster titles: 2
- All-Ireland Titles: 0
Inter-county
Years	County	Apps (scores)
2004-2008	Kerry	0
Inter-county titles
- Munster titles: 3
- All-Irelands: 3
- NFL: 2

Kieran Cremin is an Irish Gaelic footballer with the Dr. Crokes club team and formerly with the Kerry county team.

== Club ==
He had much success at club level with Dr. Crokes.

He won a Kerry Senior Football Championship title in 2000 as a panel member.

He was a back to back championship Runner-Up in 2005 and 2006, losing both to Kerry.

Despite losing the county final in 2006 Dr. Crokes regrouped and won the Munster Senior Club Football Championship. In 2007, he appeared in an All-Ireland Senior Club Football Championship final with Dr. Crokes, although they were controversially defeated in a replay by Crossmaglen Rangers.

He was on the losing side once more to South Kerry in 2009. In 2010 after three losses in six seasons he finally got his hands on a Kerry Senior Football Championship in 2010.

Despite being just 30 years old he retired soon after the 2010 win.

He also had much success in the East Kerry Senior Football Championship and Kerry County Football League - Division 1.

== Minor ==
Cremin was a member of the Kerry team that played in the 1998 All-Ireland Minor Football Championship, winning the Munster Minor Football Championship after a win over Limerick in the final. Cremins side lot out to Laois in the All-Ireland semi-final.

== Under 21 ==
He then went on to play with the county u-21 team in the All-Ireland Under-21 Football Championship winning a Munster Under-21 Football Championship in 1999. Kerry later qualified for the All-Ireland final where they had a surprise loss to Westmeath.

He was a member of the team for the next two seasons without success.

== Junior ==
Cremin went on to win a Munster Junior Football Championship with the Kerry junior side in 2002. His side later qualified for the All-Ireland only to suffer a surprise loss to Wicklow.

== Senior ==
Cremin was for some time second-choice goalkeeper on the Kerry team.

He first joined the panel in 2004. He picked up National League, Munster and All-Ireland titles as a panel member.

He had to wait until 2006 before he got his first start at senior level. He played in four games during that seasons league. He would go on to pick up another League and All-Ireland title as a panel member.

He won another set of Munster and All-Ireland titles in 2007 as a panel member, but failed to make a single appearance in league or championship.

He made two appearances during the 2008 League.

He was regarded as a talented goalkeeper and a likely successor to Diarmuid Murphy when the latter retired. Indeed, the Sunday Tribune predicted him as the 2010 All-Star goalkeeper in 2005. . However, by the time Murphy retired in 2010, so had Cremin leaving the panel after the 2008 season.
