= Ronan O'Connor (St Michael's/Foilmore Gaelic footballer) =

Kerry Gaelic footballer

Personal information
- Born: County Kerry

Sport
- Sport: Gaelic football
- Position: Forward
Club
- Years: Club
- 1998-: St Michael's/Foilmore
Club titles
- Kerry titles: 3
Inter-county
Years	County	Apps (scores)
2002-2006	Kerry	7 (0-01)
Inter-county titles
- Munster titles: 2 (1 as a sub)
- All-Irelands: 1
- NFL: 1

Ronan O'Connor is a Gaelic footballer who played for Kerry at all levels from the late 1990s to the mid-2000s. He then moved on to the Under 21 team and again won a Munster Championship in 2002. In 2002 he also joined the Senior team that made it to the All Ireland final but lost out to Armagh. He later went on to win an All Ireland medal in 2004 coming on as a sub in the final win over Mayo. He also won a National League medal in 2006.

== Club ==
He played his club football with St Michael's/Foilmore. He has enjoyed great success with the club as they have gone up the ranks of club football going from Novice to Senior and O'Connor has been part of this success. His first success came as the club won the 1998 County Novice Championship. In 2001 he was part of the team that won the County Junior Championship. 2008 proved to be the most successful in the club's history, they won a first County Intermediate title and they added a Munster Championship, in 2009 they went on to the All Ireland series where they won the All Ireland title with O'Connor playing a key role in the success. He was also key as St Michael's/Foilmore won their first ever South Kerry Senior Championship in 2007 and added a second in 2008.

He has also had success with the South Kerry divisional team. He has won 3 Kerry Senior Football Championship title in 2004-06. He was Man of the Match in the 2006 final.

== Minor ==
He first came on the intercounty scene in 1998 as part of the Kerry minor team when he won a Munster Championship medal with them.

He was underage again in 1999 but Kerry lost out to Cork in the Munster final.
