= Conor Mortimer =

Irish Gaelic footballer and manager

Personal information
- Nickname: Mort Occupation = Leisure Club - Spa Manager
- Born: 23 May 1982 (age 44) County Galway, Ireland

Sport
- Sport: Gaelic football
- Position: Right corner-forward
Clubs
- Years: Club
- Shrule-Glencorrib; Parnells
Inter-county
- Years: County
- 2000–2012: Mayo
Inter-county titles
- Connacht titles: 5
- All Stars: 1

Conor Mortimer (born 23 May 1982) is a Gaelic football manager and former player.

He was a corner-forward and has played at senior level for the Mayo county team, Connacht provincial team in the Railway Cup and club football for Shrule-Glencorrib in County Mayo and later with Dublin club Parnells. He has also played college football for DCU and UUJ. Mortimer has twice played in All-Ireland senior finals (2004 and 2006), losing both. He left the Mayo team in 2012, missing what would have been a third losing All-Ireland senior final appearance. He is famous for his blonde locks.

== Playing career ==
Mortimer was a member of the 2004 and 2006 Mayo teams, both of which lost to Kerry in the All-Ireland Final. In 2006, Mortimer was the top scorer in the All-Ireland Senior Football Championship (1-32) as Mayo took the Connacht title, came from behind to beat Dublin in the semi-final but were ultimately thrashed by Kerry in the 2006 All-Ireland Senior Football Championship Final. Rewarding his great year, Mortimer was selected in the 2006 GAA Football All Stars and the GPA Gaelic Team of the Year.

Mortimer quit the Mayo football panel the week of the 2012 Connacht football final against Sligo After feeling disrespected by management. . Former manager John Maughan expressed regret that Mortimer still has much to offer the county cause. A Mortimerless Mayo went on to reach the 2012 All-Ireland Senior Football Championship Final, which they lost to Donegal. Conor is the second all-time leading championship scorer for Mayo.

Mortimer paid to tribute to singer Michael Jackson shortly after his death in the 2009 Connacht Final. He raised his jersey to reveal a T-shirt which read the words 'RIP Micheal [sic] Jackson' after scoring Mayo's second goal to earn a one-point win.

== Managerial career ==
On 7 December 2020, Kildare club Monasterevan announced Mortimer as their new manager.

== Personal life ==
Conor's brother Kenneth is a dual All Star recipient. Another brother, Trevor is a former member and captain of the Mayo senior football panel.
