= Mayo county football team =

Gaelic football team

Mayo
- Sport: Football
- Irish: Maigh Eo
- Nickname(s): The Westerners; The Yew County; The Heather County
- County board: Mayo GAA
- Manager: Andy Moran
- Captain: Jack Coyne
- Top scorer: Cillian O'Connor (30–337)
- Home venue(s): MacHale Park, Castlebar

Recent competitive record
- Current All-Ireland status: W in 2026
- Last championship title: 2026
- Current NFL Division: 1 (3rd in 2026)
- Last league title: 2023
First colours	Second colours

The Mayo county football team (/ˈmeɪoʊ/) represents Mayo in men's Gaelic football and is governed by Mayo GAA, the county board of the Gaelic Athletic Association. The team competes in the three major annual inter-county competitions; the All-Ireland Senior Football Championship, the Connacht Senior Football Championship and the National Football League.

Mayo's home ground is MacHale Park, Castlebar. The team's manager is Andy Moran.

Mayo was the second Connacht county to win an All-Ireland Senior Football Championship (SFC), following Galway, but the first to appear in the final. The team last won the Connacht Senior Championship in 2021, the All-Ireland Senior Championship in 2026 and the National League in 2023.

Mayo has acquired a long-term record for reaching All-Ireland SFC finals only to fall at the ultimate hurdle. In 1989, the county reached a first All-Ireland SFC final since its last previous appearance in 1951 only to lose to Cork. In 1996, a freak point by Meath at the end of the final forced a replay, which saw Mayo concede another late score that would deny the county victory. Kerry bridged an 11-year title gap against Mayo in the 1997 final with a three-point win, before torturing them by eight points in the 2004 final and thirteen points in the 2006 final. In the 2012 final, Donegal bridged a 20-year gap between titles, helped in no small part by a nightmare opening quarter for Mayo as Michael Murphy launched a rocket of a shot into the goal after three minutes. Then, in the eleventh minute, Colm McFadden seized the ball from the grasp of Kevin Keane and slid it into the net for a second Donegal goal. Mayo managed thirteen points to Donegal's two goals and eleven, only got on the scoresheet after sixteen minutes when already two goals behind and never led during the match. Mayo qualified for the 2013 final, and once more came up short, this time being seen off by a Dublin team which won by a single point. The 2016 final likewise, a single point against Dublin, though this time after a replay; the drawn game featuring two own goals by Mayo players, a previously unknown occurrence in the sport, which left Mayo behind by five points at half-time despite holding Dublin scoreless for the first 30 minutes of the game. The 2017 final, and another one-point loss to Dublin. The 2020 final and Mayo conceded the fastest goal scored in the history of All-Ireland SFC finals on the way to another loss to Dublin, this one by five points. Another five-point loss followed in the 2021 final, with Ryan O'Donoghue hitting a penalty against the goalpost and numerous other goal chances being squandered. Since 1989, Mayo has played in 13 finals (including replays), losing 11 of them, with the others finishing level. Mayo managed to beat Kerry in the 2026 All-Ireland SFC final, achieving their first title in 75 years.

== History ==
Though not affiliated with the GAA through the 1890s, there is strong evidence of local GAA activity in Mayo and the rivalry with Galway which brought success to both counties from the 1930s onwards was already in evidence.

Between them, Galway and Mayo have won more than three quarters of the Connacht Senior Football Championship (SFC) titles that have been contested.

Mayo has an unequalled number of consecutive National Football League titles. The Mayo team were champions in 1934, 1935, 1936, 1937, 1938, and 1939.

=== Early years: First All-Ireland SFC title ===
One of the great turning points in GAA history west of the River Shannon was the 1935 Connacht SFC final when 26,000 spectators witnessed then league title holders Mayo defeat then All-Ireland SFC holders Galway at Dr Hyde Park in Roscommon.

Mayo was leading by a goal in the last minute of the 1936 Connacht SFC final when Brendan Nestor scored an equaliser for Galway; Nestor raised the flag himself and caused a riot. However, Mayo won the replay and went on to capture their first All-Ireland SFC, defeating Laois by 4–11 (23) to 0–5 (5) in the final.

The following year, 1937, the county was the victim of a Louis Blessing last-minute goal in the All-Ireland SFC semi-final against Cavan, another match that featured a pitch invasion. This ended Mayo's run of 57 matches without defeat.

Mayo dominated the National Football League for six years, but pulled out of the 1939–40 league in a grievance over the 1939 semi-final, a bad-tempered draw and replay with Kerry. Mayo returned to the competition to win its seventh league title in 1941. Due to the Second World War, the league was suspended for four seasons until 1946, and Mayo was unable to add to these successes.

=== Post-war: Second and third All-Ireland SFC titles ===
Following Mayo's 1939 Connacht SFC final victory, the team took nine years to emerge from the province again.

Mayo narrowly lost the 1948 All-Ireland SFC Final to Cavan and 1949 All-Ireland SFC semi-final to Meath.

However, the county returned to Croke Park to win the 1950 All-Ireland SFC when Louth's Sean Boyle had his kick-out charged down and Mick Flanagan broke through for a freak winning goal, Mayo winning the game by 2–5 (11) to 1–6 (9). Mayo retained the All-Ireland SFC the following year, with Pádraig Carney (known as the flying doctor because he had returned from the United States to play the game) scoring three late points to give Mayo a 2–8 (14) to 0–9 (9) victory against Meath. During this period, Mayo also won the National League in 1949 and 1954, the county's eighth and ninth titles in this competition. Eight wides and a one-point defeat in the replayed 1955 All-Ireland SFC semi-final against Dublin brought this period of success to an end.

Mayo went 12 years without winning another Connacht SFC title. The county then won the 1967 Connacht SFC, ending Galway's four-in-a-row All-Ireland SFC expectations in the process. Another Connacht SFC followed in 1969. Mayo also added a tenth National League title in 1970, defeating Down in the final by a scoreline of 4–7 (19) to 0–10 (10). Despite this success, the 1970s was arguably the least successful decade in the history of Mayo football, as the team failed to win a Connacht SFC title, coming closest when losing the 1975 Connacht SFC final to Sligo after a replay.

=== 1980–1991: Return to regional prominence ===
While Mayo had not won an All-Ireland SFC title since 1951, nor even qualified for the final, the 1980s brought a marked improvement in the team's fortunes. The 1981 championship bridged a twelve-year gap when Mayo defeated Sligo at MacHale Park in Castlebar in the Connacht SFC final by a scoreline of 0–12 to 0–4; however, this was followed by a heavy defeat to the sport's then dominant Kerry team, by a scoreline of 1–6 to 2–19.

The 1982 championship featured a heavy Connacht SFC final defeat to Galway at St Jarlath's Park in Tuam, and a rematch of that final the following year in Castlebar brought another defeat to Galway, by three points on this occasion. Mayo had by then been relegated to Division 2 of the National League and lost a promotion play-off to Roscommon in early 1984. For the third consecutive year, Galway and Mayo met in the Connacht SFC final, this time at Pearse Stadium. The result remained the same, with Galway completing the three-in-a-row, by a scoreline of 2–13 to 2–9.

Mayo and Galway were positioned on opposite sides of the 1985 championship draw, and easy victories over Leitrim (semi-final) and Roscommon in the final, allowed Mayo to win the title. The final notably coincided with the retirement of Roscommon player Dermot Earley Snr, whom the Mayo players chaired from the pitch at the end of the match. Mayo played Dublin in the All-Ireland SFC semi-final, the county's first championship meeting with the Dubs since 1955 ending in a draw, with a scoreline of 1–13 to 1–13. Mayo player John Finn's jaw was broken in mysterious circumstances during the first game; tension was high for the replay. However, despite a goal from Padraig Brogan, Dublin easily defeated Mayo by eight points, with a scoreline of 2–12 to 1–7. Still, this was as close as Mayo had come to an All-Ireland SFC final since 1955. Dermot Flanagan, Willie Joe Padden and Kevin McStay received All Stars in recognition of their performances during the year.

Although 1986 brought promotion to Division 1 of the National League, that year's championship campaign ended with a Connacht SFC semi-final defeat to Roscommon at McHale Park. Mayo reached the Connacht SFC final in the 1987 championship, losing to Galway in a low-scoring match which finished with a scoreline of 0–7 to 0–8. Though the team was relegated to Division 2 of the National League in 1988, the county fared better in that year's championship. Connacht SFC wins over Sligo, Leitrim and Roscommon (the last in the final) brought Mayo to another All-Ireland SFC semi-final. However, reigning All-Ireland SFC champions Meath defeated the county, by a scoreline of 0–16 to 2–5, on its way to defend the title.

Former player John O'Mahony took over as manager ahead of the 1989 season. Mixed results in the league were followed by that year's championship. After a draw in the Connacht SFC semi-final against Galway in Tuam, Mayo won the replay by a scoreline of 2–13 to 1–8 in Castlebar, with goals from Liam McHale and Anthony "Larry" Finnerty. The final, against Roscommon, was held in Castlebar. This too resulted in a draw, 0–12 to 1–9. A further 70 minutes at Dr Hyde Park a week later could not separate the teams either, with Mayo winning after extra-time by a scoreline of 3–14 to 2–13. A scrappy game against Tyrone in the All-Ireland SFC semi-final ended with Mayo winning by a scoreline of 0–12 to 1–6. This victory was made famous by an iconic image of a bandaged Willie Joe Padden. Mayo's first All-Ireland SFC final appearance in 38 years was against Cork, the runner-up in the previous two competitions. Though Mayo substitute Finnerty scored a goal in the middle of the second half, Cork won by a scoreline of 0–17 to 1–11. All Stars followed that year for Gabriel Irwin, Jimmy Browne, Dermot Flanagan, Willie Joe Padden and Noel Durkin. The team Mayo selected for the 1989 All-Ireland SFC final was full of players more accustomed to the role of midfielder than anything else, e.g. T. J. Kilgallon at centre-back and Greg Maher at wing-forward.

Mayo's 1990 championship was brief, a 2–11 to 1–12 defeat to Galway in Tuam. The following season proved little better; after big wins against London and Galway, Mayo met Roscommon in the Connacht SFC final. Derek Duggan's long-range last-minute free for Roscommon led to a replay at Dr Hyde Park, a game which Mayo lost by one point on a scoreline of 0–13 to 1–9. John O'Mahony resigned as manager at the end of the season, following a dispute between himself and the county board over team selector appointments.

=== 1991–1995: Further decline; relegation to Division 3 ===
Though Mayo won Connacht SFC titles in 1992 and 1993, the early 1990s was a largely unsuccessful period for the county, as the standard of Connacht football declined significantly between 1990 and 1995.

Former Dublin player Brian McDonald took over as manager for the 1992 season, which proved more successful for Mayo. Following a Connacht SFC first round replay victory over Galway, Mayo defeated Sligo in the Connacht SFC semi-final and then Roscommon in the final. This set up a first championship meeting for the county with Donegal in a 1992 All-Ireland SFC semi-final. Donegal, however, defeated Mayo by a scoreline of 0–13 to 0–9 to qualify for a first All-Ireland SFC final in team history, achieving an unanticipated victory over Dublin in that game. TJ Kilgallon received an All Star at midfield. A player revolt, over allegations concerning his training methods (which were said to include pushing a car around a car park), led to McDonald departing as manager.

Former Kerry player Jack O'Shea succeeded McDonald as manager for the 1993 season. Consecutive Connacht SFC titles were secured in a poor game against Roscommon, which finished with a scoreline of 1–5 to 0–7. But humiliation followed in the 1993 All-Ireland SFC semi-final against Cork, as Mayo lost by 20 points, 5–15 to 0–10. Kevin O'Neill was a rare bright spot for Mayo, and the young forward ended the year with an All Star. Despite the result, O'Shea remained in place for the 1994 campaign, which ended in a Connacht SFC final to a Leitrim team then managed by John O'Mahony. This was only Leitrim's second Connacht SFC title, and prompted O'Shea to resign.

Anthony Egan succeeded O'Shea as manager but 1995 was a low point for Mayo, with relegation to Division 3 of the National League followed by a championship campaign that ended in a seven-point defeat to Galway in the Connacht SFC final in Tuam.

=== 1995–1999: Three championship finals; one draw, two losses ===
John Maughan, noted for managing Clare to a Munster Senior Football Championship title in 1992, was brought in as manager in an effort to improve the team's position. Maughan, a former Mayo player and Defence Forces officer, was renowned for the physical fitness regime he imposed on his teams; improvements were swift. Mayo won Division 3 of the National League in 1996; then the county won its third Connacht SFC title of the decade, defeating Galway in the final. Maughan's team produced its year's best performance in the 1996 All-Ireland SFC semi-final against Kerry. Mayo won by a scoreline of 2–13 to 1–10, with a James Horan goal lobbed from a distance of 40 metres by in the last minute of the game sealing the victorya nd giving Mayo its first championship victory against Kerry since 1951.

Ray Dempsey's 45th-minute goal gave Mayo a lead of six points in the 1996 All-Ireland SFC final against Meath; however, a Meath comeback, culminating in a last-minute Colm Coyle long-range point, saw the game end in a draw on a scoreline of 1–9 to 0–12. During a bad-tempered replay – which included a brawl in which Coyle and Liam McHale, one of Mayo's most influential players, was sent off – Mayo led by four points at half-time but conceded a goal to Tommy Dowd and lost by one-point on a scoreline of 2–9 to 1–11. Kenneth Mortimer, Pat Holmes, James Nallen, Liam McHale and James Horan later received All Stars.

Mayo defeated Galway, Leitrim and Sligo (the last of these in the final) to retain the Connacht SFC title in 1997. The defeat of Galway was Mayo's first victory in Tuam for more than 30 years. Mayo reached its second successive All-Ireland SFC final following a 0–13 to 0–7 victory over Leinster Senior Football Championship winner Offaly. However, Mayo lost the 1997 All-Ireland SFC final to Kerry by a scoreline of 0–13 to 1–7 in a poor game illuminated by the skill of Kerry forward Maurice Fitzgerald. Mortimer received another All Star, with Pat Fallon also receiving one.

Mayo entered the 1998 Connacht SFC heavily favoured to win the competition, but John O'Mahony's Galway team ambushed the county in the preliminary round in Castlebar. Two Ciarán McDonald goals could not prevent a 2–6 to 1–13 defeat.

Mayo had achieved promotion in the 1997–98 National League and returned to Division 1 of the National League. Another Connacht SFC title (Mayo's fifth of the decade) followed, after wins over New York, Roscommon and Galway, this last in the final. However, Mayo failed to reach another All-Ireland SFC final, losing to Cork by a scoreline of 2–12 to 0–12 in the All-Ireland SFC semi-final. James Horan received an All Star and manager John Maughan resigned after four tumultuous seasons.

=== 1999–2010: Two championship finals ===
Pat Holmes was manager for the 2000 season, but his managerial career got off to a poor start with a Connacht SFC first round defeat against Sligo. When National League matches resumed in the spring of 2001, Mayo won the competition for the eleventh time. In what was the only national final played between the two western rivals, Mayo defeated Galway by a scoreline of 0–13 to 0–12, courtesy of substitute Marty McNicholas's late point. This was Mayo's first national title since 1970. League success did not transfer to the championship and Mayo lost the Connacht SFC final to Roscommon following a last-minute Gerry Lohan goal. That year's introduction of the All-Ireland SFC qualifier system meant Mayo received a second chance. The county met Westmeath but this too ended in a Mayo defeat, albeit after extra time, by a scoreline of 1–14 to 0–16.

Galway defeated Mayo in the opening round of the 2002 championship. Into the qualifiers once more, Mayo fared better this time with wins against Roscommon, Limerick and Tipperary, facing the latter duo for the first time in the championship. In the All-Ireland SFC quarter-final (the quarter-final stage having been added to the championship in 2001), Cork again provided the opposition and Mayo again lost, by a scoreline of 0–16 to 1–10 on this occasion.

Mayo's failure to win a Connacht SFC title under Holmes and his departure at the end of the 2002 season paved the way for John Maughan's return for a second term as team manager. The first season of Maughan's return was also a failure as Galway defeated Mayo in the Connacht SFC final and Fermanagh defeated Mayo in the last 12 of that year's All-Ireland SFC.

Mayo regained the Connacht SFC title with ease in 2004, securing facile wins over New York, Galway and Roscommon, with none of the teams able to finish its match within five points of Mayo. The county then attained an unexpected victory over reigning All-Ireland SFC champions Tyrone in the All-Ireland SFC quarter-final by a scoreline of 0–16 to 1–9. However, Mayo's form rapidly deteriorated following this win. A struggle to overcome surprise All-Ireland SFC semi-finalists Fermanagh following a replay led to an eight-point loss to Kerry in the All-Ireland SFC final on a scoreline of 1–20 to 2–9. James Nallen and Ciarán McDonald received All Stars that year.

In the 2005 championship, Mayo did not retain its title, losing to Galway in the 2005 Connacht SFC final. A three-point victory over Cavan in the All-Ireland SFC qualifiers was followed by a three-point All-Ireland SFC quarter-final defeat to Kerry, bringing an end to Maughan's second term as manager.

Mickey Moran then became Mayo's first manager from outside the county since Jack O'Shea managed the team in the early 1990s. In the 2006 championship, Moran led the team to another Connacht SFC title, defeating Galway by one point in the final. Following an unconvincing replay victory over Laois in the All-Ireland SFC quarter-final, in the semi-final against Dublin, Mayo produced arguably its greatest performance since the defeat of Kerry ten years previously. Even before the game started tensions were raised by Mayo warming up into the Hill 16 end. They were soon joined by Dublin, and some jostling occurred between players and management teams. The match itself was of high quality and resulted in Mayo coming from seven points behind with 20 minutes remaining to defeat pre-match favourite Dublin by a scoreline of 1–16 to 2–12. Ciarán McDonald's winning point from under the Hogan Stand was a particular highlight. Kerry again awaited Mayo in the All-Ireland SFC final. Kerry defeated Mayo at the competition's ultimate stage for the third time in ten years, this time by a scoreline of 4–15 to 3–5. Alan Dillon won his first All Star award, as did Conor Mortimer, joining his brother Kenneth as an award winner. Despite the relative success of the 2006 season, rumours persisted of divisions between Moran and the Mayo County Board and Moran was not retained as manager for the 2007 season.

John O'Mahony returned as Mayo manager following a 16-year absence during which he had won a Connacht SFC title with Leitrim (1994) as well as two All-Ireland SFC titles with Galway (1998 and 2001). In his first season back as manager, O'Mahony led Mayo to the National League final but this ended in defeat to Donegal. A seven-point defeat to Galway followed in the opening round of the 2007 Connacht SFC and Mayo exited the 2007 championship in the second round of the All-Ireland SFC qualifiers with a defeat to Derry at Celtic Park, a game in which Ciarán McDonald made his final appearance for Mayo as a substitute.

Mayo lost the 2008 Connacht SFC final by one point to Galway. The county then lost narrowly to eventual All-Ireland SFC winner Tyrone in a 2008 All-Ireland SFC qualifier by a scoreline of 0–13 to 1–9.

Mayo defeated Galway in the 2009 Connacht SFC final by a scoreline of 2–12 to 1–14, with Peader Gardiner's injury-time point giving Mayo a first (and only) Connacht SFC title of O'Mahony's second term as manager, and its 42nd title overall. However, a 2–15 to 1–15 defeat to Meath followed in the 2009 All-Ireland SFC quarter-final.

The 2010 season was a nadir for Mayo. Cork defeated it in a National League final, Sligo defeated it in the first round of the 2010 Connacht SFC and Longford defeated it in round one of the 2010 All-Ireland SFC qualifiers. John O'Mahony immediately resigned as Mayo manager after this game.

=== 2010–2025: Six championship finals, relegation and disposal of McStay ===
James Horan replaced O'Mahony as manager for the 2011 campaign. Horan had won a Mayo Senior Football Championship with Ballintubber as manager the previous year. After nearly losing in London in the first round of the 2011 Connacht SFC, Mayo won that year's Connacht SFC title by defeating Roscommon at a rain-sodden Dr Hyde Park. Mayo was the underdog ahead of its 2011 All-Ireland SFC quarter-final against title holder Cork but won by four points. The county's championship campaign ended at the semi-final stage, with a nine-point defeat to Kerry, but the improved performances augured well for the future. Andy Moran was subsequently selected as an All Star full-forward.

Mayo reached the 2012 National League final but lost to Cork by a scoreline of 2–10 to 0–11. Mayo retained the Connacht SFC title with wins against Leitrim and Sligo, before defeating Down in the 2012 All-Ireland SFC quarter-final. Encountering the reigning champion Dublin in an All-Ireland SFC semi-final, Mayo overcame a Dublin rally to win by a scoreline of 0–19 to 0–16 and qualify for a first All-Ireland SFC final since 2006. Conceding two goals in the first eleven minutes of that game, Mayo to Donegal by a scoreline of 2–11 to 0–13. Alan Dillon received his second All Star, while Ger Cafferkey, Keith Higgins and Lee Keegan each received their first.

Mayo easily won its third consecutive Connacht SFC in 2013, defeating Galway by 17 points, Roscommon by 12 points and first-time finalist London by 16 points. Mayo met Donegal in the 2013 All-Ireland SFC quarter-final, winning comprehensively. A six-point win over Tyrone returned Mayo to the All-Ireland SFC final. A close game was ultimately decided by a single point in favour of Mayo's opponent, with a scoreline of 2–12 to 1–14. Higgins and Keegan received their second All Stars, while Colm Boyle and Aidan O'Shea both received their first.

Horan led Mayo to the Connacht SFC title in his fourth year as team manager, after wins against New York, Roscommon and a victory against Galway in the final by a scoreline of 3–14 to 0–16. A one-point win over Cork led to a 2014 All-Ireland SFC semi-final meeting with Kerry. An improved second-half performance had Mayo leading by five points as the last five minutes approached; however, a Kieran Donaghy goal levelled the game, 1–16 apiece. The GAA fixed the replay for Gaelic Grounds in Limerick as Croke Park was unavailable due to it hosting a game of American football. Another eventful match occurred there and the teams were again level after 70 minutes of play. Kerry stretched its lead in extra time and won by a scoreline of 3–16 to 3–13. James Horan resigned as team manager immediately afterwards. Keith Higgins won his third consecutive All Star, with Colm Boyle receiving his second and Cillian O'Connor his first.

Mayo appointed Pat Holmes and Noel Connelly as joint managers ahead of the 2015 season. After defeating Galway in the 2015 Connacht SFC semi-final, a 6–25 to 2–11 victory over Sligo gave Mayo a record-breaking fifth consecutive Connacht SFC title. Another All-Ireland SFC quarter-final defeat of Donegal led to Mayo meeting Dublin again in the All-Ireland SFC semi-final. Seven points down with five minutes to go, a Cillian O'Connor penalty helped Mayo force a draw, 1–15 to 2–12. The replay was played at a high tempo, but after an even first half, Dublin pulled away in the second half to win by seven points, 3–15 to 1–14, because of a bad error by management. Lee Keegan received his third All Star and Aidan O'Shea received his second. A player protest against management over the winter led to the resignation of Holmes and Connelly.

Stephen Rochford succeeded them as Mayo manager for the 2016 season. Though its league performance was poor, Mayo avoided relegation from Division 1 for an eighteenth consecutive year. A heavy favourite to win a sixth successive Connacht SFC title, Galway achieved an unexpected win by a scoreline of 0–12 to 1–12 against Mayo in the semi-final of the competition. Mayo advanced through the 2016 All-Ireland SFC qualifiers, with unconvincing victories against Fermanagh, Kildare and Westmeath to reach an All-Ireland SFC quarter-final encounter with Tyrone. In a tight game, Mayo won by a point, 0–13 to 0–12. Tipperary awaited in the All-Ireland SFC semi-final, which Mayo won by 2–13 to 0–14 to set up an All-Ireland SFC final against Dublin. Mayo's Kevin McLoughlin and Colm Boyle both scored early own goals to give Dublin a significant half-time lead (though no Dublin player scored in the first 30 minutes of the game). Cillian O'Connor scored an equalising point in the 77th minute of play to leave the score at 0–15 to 2–9. Thus, a replay, which ended in another All-Ireland SFC final single-point defeat. Cillian O'Connor had an opportunity to bring the game to extra time in the 76th minute but he missed the free. The game finished with a scoreline of 1–15 to 1–14. David Clarke received his first All Star, Lee Keegan received his fourth All Star and was named All Stars Footballer of the Year for 2016, Colm Boyle received his third All Star and Brendan Harrison also received an All Star.

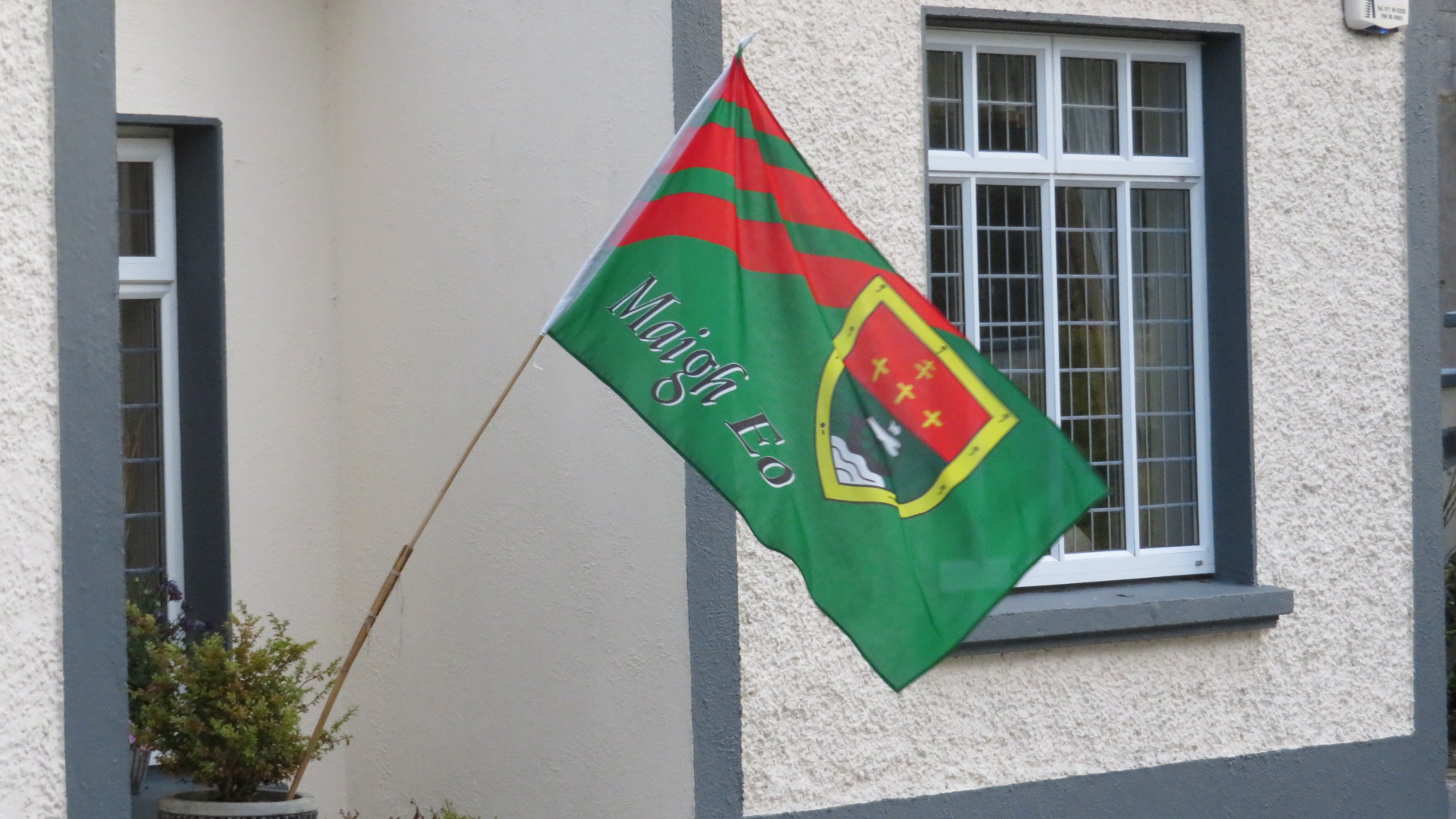
A Mayo flag flying on the day of the 2017 All-Ireland SFC final

After a 2017 Connacht SFC semi-final loss to Galway, Mayo required extra time in two games and played a total of eight games to reach the 2017 All-Ireland SFC final against Dublin. After conceding an early goal in that final, Mayo dominated the game and held control for most of the first half, leading by one point at half-time. However, Dublin recovered and Dean Rock scored a free late into injury time to win the game for his team by a scoreline of 1–17 to 1–16, inflicting a one-point defeat on Mayo at this stage and to the same opponent for a second consecutive year. Andy Moran received his second All Star and was named All Stars Footballer of the Year for 2017. Keith Higgins and Colm Boyle received their fourth All Stars, Aidan O'Shea received his third All Star, David Clarke received his second All Star and Chris Barrett also received an All Star.

Another poor league campaign in 2018 required a late Kevin McLoughlin point to salvage a draw against a Donegal team which that result relegated instead. Galway defeated Mayo in the opening round of the 2018 Connacht SFC. This obliged Mayo to participate in the All-Ireland SFC qualifiers again, and although Mayo defeated a poor Limerick team in Round One, Mayo had to earn a hard-fought win over Tipperary to secure a place in the next game against Kildare. A rejuvenated Kildare team won the game by a scoreline of 0–21 to 0–19. Rochford resigned as team manager not long after this defeat, citing that he "didn't have the backing of the board".

James Horan returned as manager in 2019. Mayo lost to Roscommon in the 2019 Connacht SFC. The county defeated Down, Armagh and Galway in All-Ireland SFC qualifiers. The campaign ended in defeat (by a scoreline of 3–14 to 1–10) to Dublin at the All-Ireland SFC semi-final stage, with Con O'Callaghan scoring two goals and Brian Fenton scoring the other. Paddy Durcan received an All Star.

The county was relegated from Division 1 on the final day of the 2020 National League, its first time to exit the top flight in 23 years, with Tyrone heavily defeating the team in Castlebar. Mayo reached the 2020 All-Ireland SFC final, Dublin again the victors, while conceding the fastest goal scored in the history of All-Ireland SFC finals, knocking more than 20 seconds off a record which had stood for 58 years.

In 2021, Mayo gained promotion at the first attempt back to Division 1 of the National Football League with a 2–22 to 2–18 win over Clare in the final round of that competition. Another All-Ireland SFC final, another five-point loss, with Ryan O'Donoghue hitting a penalty against the goalpost and numerous other goal chances being squandered. A 2022 All-Ireland SFC quarter-final exit to Kerry was followed within hours by the resignation of manager James Horan.

In 2025, under the management of Kevin McStay, Mayo lost to Cavan in a championship game for the first time since the 1948 All-Ireland SFC final. Less than a week later, McStay became ill during training at MacHale Park. On 26 May, McStay stepped back from managing Mayo to deal with his health problems and former manager Stephen Rochford took his place. Rochford was interim manager for two games, as Mayo made an early championship exit. The Mayo County Board then decided to "relieve Kevin McStay and his management team from their roles" with the team, although their four-year term was not complete.

=== 2025–present: Fourth All-Ireland SFC title ===
It was Andy Moran took on the poisoned mantle of manager. He took over things in 2025.

On 14 August 2025, Mayo ratified Moran as new manager.

Due to the impact of the COVID-19 pandemic on Gaelic games, Mayo's 2021 Connacht SFC game in London had not been permitted to occur for the second time in its history, after the UK's 2001 foot-in-mouth outbreak caused to fixture to be postponed. Mayo's first trip to London since the 1996 Connacht Senior Football Championship occurred 10 years later, and coincidentally the first trip there since 2016 Connacht SFC would take place another 10 years afterwards. The match took place on Saturday 11 April 2026; the score was the same as previous game in 2016, with Mayo winning 0–31 to 1–15.

Mayo finished third in the NFL Division 1, qualifying for the 2026 All-Ireland SFC via NFL ranking after losing to Roscommon in the semi-finals of the Connacht SFC. Mayo entered the 2026 All-Ireland SFC final against Kerry having lost to Tyrone in Round 2A, but winning all other clashes in the competition. Mayo would win the final by 1–20 to 1–17, to get a 4th overall All-Ireland SFC title and the first since the previous win in 1951, after 75 years of emptiness.

Marty Morrissey's call of the final seconds and aftermath on RTÉ:

"...Seventy-five years of heartbreak are about to end! 1936, 1950, 1951, and surely now, 2026! Listen to the roar! Seventy-five years of heartbreak is OVER!! Mayo are the All-Ireland Senior Football Champions 2026!"

== Curse ==
Since the 1990s, a sports curse story had circulated that Mayo would not win another All-Ireland until all members of the 1951 team had died. The supposed cause was that the 1951 champions, returning through Foxford in a coach or lorry, passed a funeral cortège without respectfully suspending their boisterous celebrations, and were cursed by either the priest, the bereaved spouse, or a Traveller. Folklorist Arlene Crampsie, who conducted interviews in Mayo for the 2008–2012 GAA Oral History Project, found that participants had no interest in the story and regarded it as "recently contrived nonsense" spread by the media in the wake of multiple recent near-misses. In a 2016 TG4 documentary, the two surviving 1951 players, Paddy Prendergast and Pádraig Carney dismissed the story. Carney died on 9 June 2019 — leaving Prendergast as the last surviving player from the 1951 team. Prendergast died on 26 September 2021, 15 days after Mayo lost in the 2021 All-Ireland Final. The last overall member of the 1951 team — Mick Loftus, who was a sub and did not play on the day — died at the age of 93 on 22 April 2023. Mayo won the All-Ireland Senior Football Championship in 2026, their first appearance in the All-Ireland Final after all members of the 1951 team had died, ending a seventy-five year wait.

== Colours and crest ==
County Mayo coat of arms

The team's traditional colours are green and red. The Mayo jersey will commonly be mostly green, with a thick horizontal red stripe just below chest level. These colours are inspired by "The Green Above The Red", a rebel song.

Mayo's current crest is based on the county's coat of arms, which is shown on the left. It features four crosses, each representing a diocese of the Catholic Church in Mayo. The Patriarchal or 'double' cross represents the Archdiocese of Tuam, while the three smaller Passion crosses represent Achonry, Killala and Galway/Kilmacduagh/Kilfenora. The Irish-language root word of the county, Maigh Eo, means "plain of the yew trees", and the trees that surround the crest represent this. As well as this, the number of trees is significant, with the nine trees representing the number of baronies in the county. The sailing ship represents the county's maritime history, while the red sea below the green hills represents the traditional "green above the red" motif of the county. The Mayo GAA crest also features the Irish words Críost Linn, which translates to "Christ be with us".

== Stadium ==
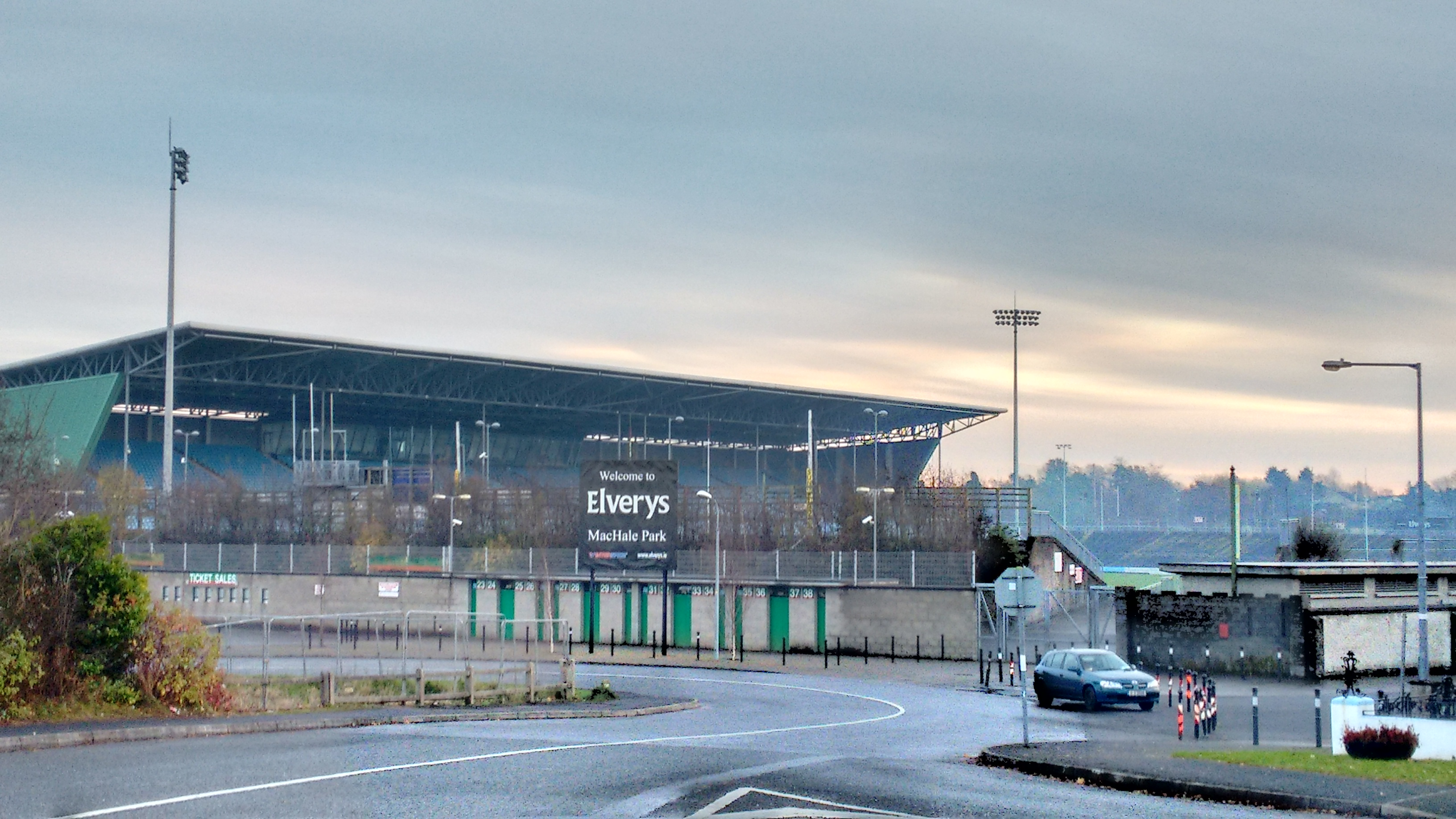
MacHale Park in November 2016

MacHale Park in Castlebar is the largest stadium in the province of Connacht. Its pitch is much criticised.

It can hold around ten thousand more people than Pearse Stadium, the home venue of Galway, to the south.

== Support ==
Mayo's unofficial supporters club is Mayo Club '51. The name of the club commemorates the year that Mayo last won the Sam Maguire Cup, a year which is synonymous with Mayo football.

Their songs include:

- "Boys from the County Mayo" - Margo
- "Hay Wrap" - The Saw Doctors
- "The Green and Red of Mayo" - The Saw Doctors
- "To Win Just Once" - The Saw Doctors
- "Sam Maguire is Coming Home to Mayo"
- "Mayo Anthem 96" - Tom Tom and the Byrne Maids
- "Fight for Sam 2006" - Dave Howley
- "Mayo are Back" - Mike Denver
- "51 Years Without Sam" - Combine Devastator
- "The Dream Has Never Died" - Michael S. Togher
- "Mayo Get Up and Go" - Declan Nerney
- "Mayo, Here We Go" - Arís
- "The Mayo Man" - Mylo Kelly
- "This is Our Year" – Nicole and Elisha Gannon
- "Mayo for Sam" – Chris and Dave
- "Horan's Men" – Gary O'Malley
- "Seven Mayo Finals" – Wavelength
- "Mayo Cup Song" – Connors/Coynes/Gannon
- "This Year is For Mayo" – Barry Staunton
- "In the Name of Mayo" - The Duffys
- "Bring Sam Home" - Avril Agnes Rushe
- "Fight for Sam 2020" - Dave Howley

The many songs since 2012 resulted from a hitherto unsuccessful effort to match "Jimmy's Winning Matches", which became an anthem for the team that defeated Mayo in that year's final.

Gaelic football is a traditional sport for the county of Mayo, having attracted huge numbers of spectators at all three levels. As mentioned by Conor Neville, an RTÉ Sport reporter, “the county enjoys one of the most consistently passionate sets of fans in Irish sports.

A Mayo jersey with the signature of Pope Francis has been on display at Ireland West Airport since a 2018 visit.

Kevin Kilbane was a fan from boyhood, became a member of a fanclub upon his retirement from professional association football in 2012, and attended many games when he lived in Ireland, including league matches such was his dedication to team.

The Chicago Federation of Labor displayed the words "Mayo for Sam" in lights on the 41-storey Prudential Building ahead of the 2020 All-Ireland Senior Football Championship final. Dublin Castle was also lit up in the Mayo colours ahead of the game.

=== Rivalries ===
- Dublin–Mayo Gaelic football rivalry
- Galway–Mayo Gaelic football rivalry
- Kerry–Mayo Gaelic football rivalry
- Cork–Mayo Gaelic football rivalry
- Mayo–Meath Gaelic football rivalry
- Leitrim–Mayo Gaelic football rivalry
- Mayo–Roscommon Gaelic football rivalry
- Mayo–Sligo Gaelic football rivalry

== Panel ==
Team as per Mayo vs Derry in the 2024 All-Ireland Senior Football Championship Preliminary Quarter Final, 22 June 2024:

No.	Player	Position	Club
1	Colm Reape	Goalkeeper	Knockmore
2	Jack Coyne	Right corner back	Ballyhaunis
3	David McBrien	Full back	Ballaghadereen
4	Donnacha McHugh	Left corner back	Castlebar Mitchels
5	Rory Brickenden	Right half back	Westport
6	Sam Callinan	Centre back	Ballina Stephenites
7	Eoghan McLaughlin	Left half back	Westport
8	Stephen Coen (c)	Midfield	Hollymount-Carramore
9	Matthew Ruane	Midfield	Breaffy
10	Tommy Conroy	Right half forward	The Neale
11	Darren McHale	Centre forward	Knockmore
12	Jordan Flynn	Left half forward	Crossmolina DR
13	Aidan O'Shea	Right corner forward	Breaffy
14	Jack Carney	Full forward	Kilmeena
15	Ryan O'Donoghue	Left corner forward	Belmullet

No.	Player	Position	Club
16	Rob Hennelly	Substitute	Raheny
17	James Carr	Substitute	Ardagh
18	Enda Hession	Substitute	Garrymore
19	Conor Loftus	Substitute	Crossmolina
20	Cillian O'Connor	Substitute	Ballintubber
21	Diarmuid O'Connor	Substitute	Ballintubber
22	Eoin O'Donoghue	Substitute	Belmullet
23	Pádraig O'Hora	Substitute	Ballina Stephenites
24	Michael Plunkett	Substitute	Ballintubber
25	Paul Towey	Substitute	Charlestown Sarsfields
26	Bob Tuohy	Substitute	Castlebar Mitchels

^{INJ} Player has had an injury which has affected recent involvement with the county team.
^{RET} Player has since retired from the county team.
^{WD} Player has since withdrawn from the county team due to a non-injury issue.

== Management team ==
As of August 2025:

- Manager: Andy Moran
- Selector(s): Colm Boyle, Paddy Tally
- Goalkeeping coach: Paul Durcan

== Managerial history ==
Key
*	Interim manager

Mayo Senior Football Manager
Dates	Name	Origin	Honours
1977–1980	Johnny Carey	?	?
1983–1987	Liam O'Neill		?
1987–1991	John O'Mahony	?	?
1991–1992	Brian McDonald	?	?
1992–1994	Jack O'Shea		?
1994–1995	Anthony Egan	?	?
1995–1999	John Maughan	?	?
1999–2002	Pat Holmes	?	2000–01 NFL Division 1
2002–2005	John Maughan (2)	?	?
2005–2006	Mickey Moran		?
2006–2010	John O'Mahony (2)	?	?
2010–2014	James Horan	?	2011 Connacht SFC; 2012 Connacht SFC; 2013 Connacht SFC; 2014 Connacht SFC
2014–2015	Noel Connelly	?	2015 Connacht SFC
2014–2015	Pat Holmes (2)	?	2015 Connacht SFC
2015–2018	Stephen Rochford	Crossmolina Deel Rovers	?
2018–2022	James Horan (2)	?	2019 NFL Division 1; 2020 Connacht SFC; 2021 Connacht SFC
2022–2025	Kevin McStay	?	2023 NFL Division 1
May–June 2025	Stephen Rochford (2)^{*}	Crossmolina Deel Rovers	—N/a
2025–	Andy Moran	Ballaghaderreen	2026 All Ireland SFC

* Stephen Rochford was originally a selector in 2025, but was appointed interim manager for Mayo's final two championship games after Kevin McStay was forced out by illness.

== Players ==
=== Records ===
- Pádraig Carney had the distinction of being the first player to score a goal from a penalty in an All-Ireland final.
- Lee Keegan is the highest scoring defender of all time, having clocked up 7–48 in 67 championship matches.
- Cillian O'Connor became the highest scoring player in the All-Ireland Senior Football Championship, surpassing the record of Kerry's Colm Cooper, a feat O'Connor achieved against Kerry during a defeat in Killarney in 2019. He had done this by scoring in all of his previous 51 previous Championship matches prior to the record breaking match, except for one game against London in 2013 when he had been black carded.
- O'Connor's four goals (accompanied by nine points) in the 2020 All-Ireland Senior Football Championship semi-final at Croke Park broke the 5–3 record set by Johnny Joyce of Dublin in 1960 and matched with 3–9 by Rory Gallagher of Fermanagh in 2002 for the highest individual scorer in any championship football match.

==== Most appearances ====
Lee Keegan: 140 appearances, as of end of 2022 season (140th in championship elimination by Kerry)

- The following are among those to have made the highest number of appearances for the senior team:

#	Name	Career	Apps
1	James Nallen	1995–2010	132
2	Dermot Flanagan	1982–1997	122
3			
4			
5			
6			
7			
8			
9			
10			
11			
12			
13			
14			
15			
16			
17			
18			
	Cillian O'Connor	2011–	100

=== All Stars ===
Mayo has 48 All Stars, as of 2017. 29 different players have won, as of 2017. Lee Keegan won five All Stars, and is the only player to win five All Stars without winning an All-Ireland medal (he also never played at minor level).

Mayo's John Carey was among the inaugural selection in 1971. Despite winning only two awards in total during their unsuccessful 1970s period, Mayo have been one of the most successful teams nationally in terms of All Star awards gained, with Mayo players winning 42 awards to date. Willie Joe Padden and Dermot Flanagan became the first Mayo players to win multiple awards, both winning their second awards in 1989. Kenneth Mortimer achieved the same feat in 1997, as did James Horan in 1999 and James Nallen in 2004. Mortimer became the first Mayo player to win consecutive awards, in 1996 and 1997, a feat matched by Colm Boyle (2013, 2014 and again, 2016, 2017), Lee Keegan (2012, 2013, and again, 2015, 2016) and David Clarke (2016, 2017), and exceeded by Keith Higgins, who completed three-in-a-row in 2014. Kenneth and Conor Mortimer became the first Mayo siblings to win awards when Conor won an All Star in 2006.

Year	Player	Position
1971	Johnny Carey	Right-full back
1979	Joe McGrath	Left-full forward
1985	Dermot Flanagan	Left-full back
1985	Willie Joe Padden	Midfield
1985	Kevin McStay	Right-full forward
1989	Gabriel Irwin	Goalkeeper
1989	Jimmy Browne	Right-full back
1989	Dermot Flanagan^{2nd}	Left-full back
1989	Wille Joe Padden^{2nd}	Midfield
1989	Noel Durkin	Left-half forward
1992	T. J. Kilgallon	Midfield
1993	Kevin O'Neill	Right-half forward
1996	Kenneth Mortimer	Right-full back
1996	Pat Holmes	Right-half back
1996	James Nallen	Centre-half back
1996	Liam McHale	Midfield
1996	James Horan	Left-half forward
1997	Kenneth Mortimer^{2nd}	Right-full back
1997	Pat Fallon	Midfield
1999	James Horan^{2nd}	Left-half forward
2004	James Nallen^{2nd}	Centre-half back
2004	Ciarán McDonald	Centre-half forward
2006	Alan Dillon	Left-half forward
2006	Conor Mortimer	Right-full forward
2011	Andy Moran	Full forward
2012	Ger Cafferkey	Full back
2012	Keith Higgins	Left-full back
2012	Lee Keegan	Right-half back
2012	Alan Dillon^{2nd}	Centre-half forward
2013	Keith Higgins^{2nd}	Left-full back
2013	Lee Keegan^{2nd}	Right-half back
2013	Colm Boyle	Left-half back
2013	Aidan O'Shea	Midfield
2014	Keith Higgins^{3rd}	Left-full back
2014	Colm Boyle^{2nd}	Left-half back
2014	Cillian O'Connor	Right-corner forward
2015	Lee Keegan^{3rd}	Right-half back
2015	Aidan O'Shea^{2nd}	Full-forward
2016	David Clarke	Goalkeeper
2016	Brendan Harrison	Right-full back
2016	Lee Keegan^{4th}	Right-half back
2016	Colm Boyle^{3rd}	Centre-half back
2017	David Clarke^{2nd}	Goalkeeper
2017	Chris Barrett	Right-full back
2017	Keith Higgins^{3rd}	Left-full back
2017	Colm Boyle^{4th}	Right-half back
2017	Aidan O'Shea^{3rd}	Centre-half forward
2017	Andy Moran^{2nd}	Left-corner forward

=== Footballer of the Year ===
The GAA & GPA All Stars Footballer of the Year—known for sponsorship reasons as the Vodafone Footballer of the Year—is an annual award given at the end of the Championship season to a footballer who is adjudged to have been the best in Gaelic football. Players from Mayo have won this twice, with Lee Keegan winning it in 2016 and Andy Moran winning it in 2017, Mayo did not win the All-Ireland Championship in either of those years.

- 2016 - Lee Keegan
- 2017 - Andy Moran

=== Young Footballer of the Year ===
The GAA & GPA All Stars Young Footballer of the Year (often called simply Young Footballer of the Year) is an annual award given at the end of the Championship season to a young footballer under the age of 21 who is adjudged to have been the best in Gaelic football.

Players from Mayo have won this award more times (7) than players from any other county since the award was instituted in 1997. Cillian and Diarmuid are the only set of brothers to win the award; they and Oisín Mullin are the only multiple winners of the award.

- 2006 - Keith Higgins
- 2011 - Cillian O'Connor
- 2012 - Cillian O'Connor^{2nd}
- 2015 - Diarmuid O'Connor
- 2016 - Diarmuid O'Connor^{2nd}
- 2020 - Oisín Mullin
- 2021 - Oisín Mullin^{2nd}

=== Team of the Century and Team of the Millennium ===
The Team of the Century was nominated in 1984 by Sunday Independent readers and selected by a panel of experts including journalists and former players. It was chosen as part of the Gaelic Athletic Association's centenary year celebrations. Two Mayo players were chosen on the team. These were Seán Flanagan at left-corner-back and Tommy Langan at full-forward.

Similarly The Team of the Millennium was a team chosen in 1999 by a panel of GAA past presidents and journalists. The goal was to single out the best ever 15 players who had played the game in their respective positions, since the foundation of the GAA in 1884 up to the Millennium year, 2000. Both Flanagan and Langan were also selected on this team, occupying the same positions.

== Competitive record ==
This is Mayo's record in All-Ireland SFC finals. Bold denotes a year in which the team won the competition.

Year	Date	Winner	Score	Loser	Score	Venue	Attendance	Winning Margin
1916	17 December	Wexford	3–4 (13)	Mayo	1–2 (5)	Croke Park	3,000	8
1921	17 June 1923	Dublin	1–9 (12)	Mayo	0–2 (2)	Croke Park	16,000	10
1932	25 September	Kerry	2–7 (13)	Mayo	2–4 (11)	Croke Park	25,816	3
**1936**	27 September	Mayo	4–11 (20)	Laois	0–5 (5)	Croke Park	50,168	18
1948	25 September	Cavan	4–5 (17)	Mayo	4-4 (16)	Croke Park	74,645	1
**1950**	24 September	Mayo	2–5 (11)	Louth	1–6 (9)	Croke Park	76,174	2
**1951**	23 September	Mayo	2–8 (14)	Meath	0–9 (9)	Croke Park	78,201	5
1989	17 September	Cork	0–17 (17)	Mayo	1–11 (14)	Croke Park	65,519	3
1996	15 September	Meath	0–12 (12)	Mayo	1–9 (12)	Croke Park	65,898	n/a (Draw)
1996	29 September	Meath	2–9 (15)	Mayo	1–11 (14)	Croke Park	65,802	1 (Replay)
1997	28 September	Kerry	0–13 (13)	Mayo	1–7 (10)	Croke Park	65,601	3
2004	26 September	Kerry	1-20 (23)	Mayo	2–9 (15)	Croke Park	79,749	8
2006	17 September	Kerry	4–15 (27)	Mayo	3–5 (14)	Croke Park	82,289	13
2012	23 September	Donegal	2–11 (17)	Mayo	0–13 (13)	Croke Park	82,269	4
2013	22 September	Dublin	2–12 (18)	Mayo	1–14 (17)	Croke Park	82,274	1
2016	18 September	Dublin	2–9 (15)	Mayo	0–15 (15)	Croke Park	82,257	n/a (Draw)
2016	1 October	Dublin	1–15 (18)	Mayo	1–14 (17)	Croke Park	82,249	1 (Replay)
2017	17 September	Dublin	1–17 (20)	Mayo	1–16 (19)	Croke Park	82,243	1
2020	19 December	Dublin	2–14 (20)	Mayo	0–15 (15)	Croke Park	0 (Note: The game was played behind closed doors due to the impact of the COVID-19 pandemic on Gaelic games.)	5
2021	11 September	Tyrone	2–14 (20)	Mayo	0–15 (15)	Croke Park	41,150	5
**2026**	26 July	Mayo	1–20 (23)	Kerry	1–17 (20)	Croke Park	82,300	3

== Honours ==
=== National ===
- All-Ireland Senior Football Championship
  - (gold) Winners (4): 1936, 1950, 1951, 2026
  - (silver) Runners-up (15): 1916, 1921, 1932, 1948, 1989, 1996, 1997, 2004, 2006, 2012, 2013, 2016, 2017, 2020, 2021
- National Football League
  - (gold) Winners (13): 1933–34, 1934–35, 1935–36, 1936–37, 1937–38, 1938–39, 1940–41, 1948–49, 1953–54, 1969–70, 2000–01, 2019, 2023
  - (silver) Runners-up (9): 1950–51, 1970–71, 1971–72, 1977–78, 2007, 2010, 2012, 2022, 2025
- All-Ireland Junior Football Championship
  - (gold) Winners (5): 1933, 1950, 1957, 1995, 1997
- All-Ireland Under-21 Football Championship
  - (gold) Winners (5): 1967, 1974, 1983, 2006, 2016
- All-Ireland Minor Football Championship
  - (gold) Winners (7): 1935, 1953, 1966, 1971, 1978, 1985, 2013
- All-Ireland Vocational Schools Championship
  - (gold) Winners (4): 1971, 1975, 1982, 1999
- National Football League Division 2
  - (gold) Winners (2): 1986, 2021
- National Football League Division 3
  - (gold) Winners (1): 1996

=== Provincial ===
- Connacht Senior Football Championship
  - (gold) Winners (48): 1901, 1903, 1904, 1906, 1907, 1908, 1909, 1910, 1915, 1916, 1918, 1920, 1921, 1923, 1924, 1929, 1930, 1931, 1932, 1935, 1936, 1937, 1939, 1948, 1949, 1950, 1951, 1955, 1967, 1969, 1981, 1985, 1988, 1989, 1992, 1993, 1996, 1997, 1999, 2004, 2006, 2009, 2011, 2012 2013, 2014, 2015, 2020, 2021
  - (silver) Runners-up (36): 1903, 1905, 1913, 1917, 1925, 1926, 1928, 1933, 1934, 1938, 1940, 1944, 1945, 1946, 1952, 1953, 1964, 1966, 1968, 1972, 1973, 1975, 1980, 1982, 1983, 1984, 1987, 1991, 1994, 1995, 2001, 2003, 2005, 2008, 2024, 2025
- Connacht FBD League
  - (gold) Winners (8): 1995, 1996, 2000, 2003, 2010, 2011, 2012, 2023
- Connacht Junior Football Championship
  - (gold) Winners (30): 1907, 1913, 1914, 1924, 1925, 1927, 1930, 1933, 1934, 1936, 1937, 1950, 1951, 1953, 1955, 1957, 1963, 1967, 1968, 1970, 1971, 1993, 1995, 1997, 2001, 2002, 2007, 2012, 2015, 2016
- Connacht Minor Football Championship
  - (gold) Winners (43): 1930, 1931, 1933, 1934, 1935, 1936, 1940, 1946, 1947, 1950, 1953, 1954, 1955, 1957, 1958, 1961, 1962, 1963, 1964, 1966, 1971, 1973, 1974, 1977, 1978, 1979, 1980, 1985, 1991, 1996, 1997, 1999, 2000, 2001, 2008, 2009, 2010, 2013, 2014, 2019, 2022, 2023, 2024
- Connacht Under-21 Football Championship
  - (gold) Winners (26): 1967, 1968, 1970, 1971, 1973, 1974, 1975, 1976, 1980, 1983, 1984, 1985, 1986, 1994, 1995, 1997, 2001, 2003, 2004, 2006, 2007, 2008, 2009, 2016, 2018, 2025
