= 1985 All-Ireland Senior Football Championship =

Football championship

Championship details
- Dates: 5 May – 22 September 1985
- Teams: 32

All-Ireland Champions
- Winning team: Kerry (29th win)
- Captain: Páidí Ó Sé
- Manager: Mick O'Dwyer

All-Ireland Finalists
- Losing team: Dublin
- Captain: Brian Mullins
- Manager: Kevin Heffernan

Provincial Champions
- Munster: Kerry
- Leinster: Dublin
- Ulster: Monaghan
- Connacht: Mayo

Championship statistics
- No. matches played: 37
- Top Scorer: Barney Rock (3–28)
- Player of the Year: Jack O'Shea

The 1985 All-Ireland Senior Football Championship was the 99th staging of the All-Ireland Senior Football Championship, the Gaelic Athletic Association's premier inter-county Gaelic football tournament. The championship began on 5 May 1985 and ended on 22 September 1985.

Kerry entered the championship as the defending champions. Notably, the All-Ireland final was postponed specifically because both semi-finals were drawn and required replays.

On 22 September 1985, Kerry won the championship following a 2–12 to 2–8 defeat of Dublin in the All-Ireland final. This was their 29th All-Ireland title and their second championship in succession.

Dublin's Barney Rock was the championship's top scorer with 3–28. Kerry's Jack O'Shea was the choice for Texaco Footballer of the Year.

== Results ==
=== Connacht Senior Football Championship ===
Quarter-finals

2 June 1985 Quarter-final	London	0–10 – 1–15	Roscommon	Emerald GAA Grounds, Ruislip
	R O'Dwyer 0–2, B Grealish 0–2, P Larkin 0–1, M Collins 0–1, J McPartlan 0–1, K McAllister 0–1, B Vaughan 0–1, J Archbold 0–1.		T McManus 0–5, P Earley 0–4, G Emmet 1–0, E McManus 0–3, P McNeill 0–2, S Hayden 0–1.	Referee: PJ McGrath (Mayo)

2 June 1985 Quarter-final	Sligo	2–3 – 1–6	Leitrim	Markievicz Park, Sligo
	M McCarrick 1–0, J Kearins 1–0, T Mahon 0–3.		B Doyle 1–0, F Flynn 0–3, J Ward 0–1, K McKeown 0–1, J Reynolds 0–1.	Referee: J Hopkins (Mayo)

16 June 1985 Quarter-final replay	Leitrim	3–7 – 0–11	Sligo	Páirc Sheáin Mhic Dhiarmada, Carrick-on-Shannon
	B Doyle 2–1, J Martin 1–1, S McManus 0–2, J Reynolds 0–2, F Holohan 0–1.		T Mahon 0–5, S Durkin 0–3, J Kearns 0–1, R Henneberry 0–1, J Kent 0–1.	Referee: S McMenamon (Galway)

Semi-finals

16 June 1985 Semi-final	Roscommon	0–11 – 0–11	Galway	Dr. Hyde Park, Roscommon
	D Earley 0–5, P Earley 0–3, T McManus 0–2, T O'Brien 0–1.		S Joyce 0–6, B O'Donnell 0–2, B Brennan 0–2, G McManus 0–1.	Referee: M Kearns (Sligo)

23 June 1985 Semi-final	Leitrim	0–5 – 2–11	Mayo	Páirc Sheáin Mhic Dhiarmada, Carrick-on-Shannon
	M Martin 0–2, P Kelly 0–1, J Reynolds 0–1, M Quinn 0–1.		H Gavin 1–3, E McHale 1–1, K McStay 0–2, N Durkin 0–2, WJ Padden 0–1, D McGrath 0–1, D Flanagan 0–1.	Referee: S Mullaney (Roscommon)

30 June 1985 Semi-final replay	Galway	1–12 – 1–14	Roscommon	Tuam Stadium, Tuam
	J Purcell 1–1, S Joyce 0–4, B Brennan 0–3, T Tierney 0–3, R Flaherty 0–1.		P Earley 0–5, T O'Brien 1–0, T McManus 0–3, E McManus Snr. 0–3, D Earley 0–3.	Attendance: 8,000; Referee: M Kearns (Sligo)

Final

14 July 1985 Final	Roscommon	0–8 – 2–11	Mayo	Dr. Hyde Park, Roscommon
	D Earley 0–5, T McManus 0–1, S Hayden 0–1, T O'Brien 0–1.		K McStay 0–7, N Durcan 1–1, S Lowry 1–0, E McHale 0–2, H Gavin 0–1.	Attendance: 18,000; Referee: M Kearns (Sligo)

Quarter-finals
London	0–10
Roscommon	1–15
Leitrim	1–6; 3–7
Sligo	2–3; 0–11

Semi-finals
Roscommon	0–11; 1–14
Galway	0–11; 1–12
Leitrim	0–5
Mayo	2–11

Final
Roscommon	0–8
Mayo	2–11

=== Leinster Senior Football Championship ===
Preliminary round

5 May 1985 Preliminary round	Kildare	1–11 – 0–9	Wicklow	St. Conleth's Park, Newbridge
	L Tompkins 0–6, M Moore 1–0, B Donovan 0–2, S Fahy 0–1, C Moran 0–1, P Farrell 0–1.		P Baker 0–5, K Baker 0–3, C Murpjy 0–1.	Referee: T Jordan (Dublin)

19 May 1985 Preliminary round	Carlow	3–11 – 1–4	Westmeath	Dr. Cullen Park, Carlow
	P Quirke 2–0, W Doyle 1–3, L Canavan 0–5, K Madden 0–2, L Kearns 0–1.		E Tuite 1–2, S Hanratty 0–2.	Referee: S Aldridge (Kildare)

26 May 1985 Preliminary round	Longford	0–14 – 3–8	Wexford	Pearse Park, Longford
	J McCormack 0–4, K O'Rourke 0–3, F McNamee 0–2, E McCormack 0–2, M O'Hraa 0–1, M Duggan 0–1, D Barry 0–1.		M Hanrick 2–1, E Mahon 0–4, S Fitzhnery 1–0, J McGovern 0–1, G Byrne 0–1, L Rafter 0–1.

Quarter-finals

2 June 1985 Quarter-final	Meath	0–13 – 0–7	Kildare	Páirc Tailteann, Navan
	L Smith 0–4, C O'Rourke 0–3, JJ McCormack 0–2, M McCabe 0–2, G McEntee 0–1, B Flynn 0–1.		L Tompkins 0–3, S Fahy 0–2, P Farrell 0–1, B o'Donoghue 0–1.	Referee: J Gunning (Offaly)

9 June 1985 Quarter-final	Carlow	1–7 – 2–8	Laois	Dr. Cullen Park, Carlow
	W Doyle 1–1, L Canavan 0–3, J Owens 0–1, J Hayden 0–1, K Madden 0–1.		G Lalor 1–2, W Brennan 1–0, G Browne 0–2, N Prendergast 0–1, C Browne 0–1, S Dempsey 0–1, C Maguire 0–1.	Referee: C Buckley (Offaly)

16 June 1985 Quarter-final	Wexford	0–6 – 4–13	Dublin	Wexford Park, Wexford
	L Rafter 0–2, G Byrne 0–2, T Foran 0–1, E Mahon 0–1.		B Rock 2–4, T Carr 1–3, J Caffrey 1–0, C Duff 0–2, J Ronayne 0–1, J McNally 0–1, P Canavan 0–1, A McCaul 0–1.	Referee: P Collins (Westmeath)

16 June 1985 Quarter-final	Offaly	3–16 – 1–8	Louth	O'Connor Park, Tullamore
	P Brady 1–3, J Guinan 1–2, P Spollen 0–5, P Dunne 1–1, B Lowry 0–3, J Mooney 0–2.		E Judge 1–0, J McDonnell 0–3, M McCann 0–2, R Culhane 0–1, M McDermott 0–1, John McDonnell 0–1.	Referee: P Kavanagh (Meath)

Semi-finals

30 June 1985 Semi-final	Laois	2–11 – 0–7	Meath	O'Connor Park, Tullamore
	W Brennan 1–0, P Doran 1–0, L Irwin 0–3, C Maguire 0–3, G Lalor 0–2, J Costello 0–1, C Browne 0–1, G Browne 0–1.		B Flynn 0–2, C O'Rourke 0–1, G McEntee 0–1, M O'Connell 0–1, A Crickley 0–1, F Murtagh 0–1.	Referee: J Gunning (Offaly)

7 July 1985 Semi-final	Offaly	0–10 – 2–13	Dublin	O'Connor Park, Tullamore
	B Lowry 0–8, P Dunne 0–1, J Guinan 0–1.		T Conroy 1–1, J McNally 1–1, B Rock 0–3, T Carr 0–3, A McCaul 0–3, J Ronyane 0–1, K Duff 0–1.	Attendance: 25,000; Referee: P Collins (Westmeath)

Final

28 July 1985 Final	Dublin	0–10 – 0–4	Laois	Croke Park, Dublin
	Barney Rock 0–6 (0-4f), Anto McCaul 0–2, Jim Ronayne and Tommy Carr 0–1 each		Liam Irwin (0-1f), Willie Brennan, Christy Maguire (0-1f), Gerry Browne 0–1 each	Attendance: 33,425; Referee: Paddy Kavanagh (Meath)

Preliminary Round
Wexford	3–8
Longford	0–14
Carlow	3–11
Westmeath	1–4
Kildare	1–11
Wicklow	0–9

Quarter-finals
Dublin	4–13
Wexford	0–6
Offaly	3–16
Louth	1–8
Laois	2–8
Carlow	1–7
Meath	0–13
Kildare	0–7

Semi-finals
Dublin	2–13
Offaly	0–10
Laois	2–11
Meath	0–7

Final
Dublin	0–10
Laois	0–4

=== Munster Senior Football Championship ===
Quarter-finals

26 May 1985 Quarter-final	Waterford	0–7 – 2–10	Limerick	Fraher Field, Dungarvan
	E O'Brien 0–4, J Maher 0–2, R Prendeville 0–1.		T Quaid 1–0, F Ryan 1–0, T Cummins 0–3, A Shanahan 0–2, D Fitzgibbon 0–2, D Kiely 0–1, M Quish 0–1, P Barrett 0–1.	Referee: C O'Connor (Cork)

9 June 1985 Quarter-final	Clare	1–7 – 0–10	Tipperary	Cusack Park, Ennis
	T Tubridy 1–0, N Roche 0–2, P McNamar 0–2, N Normoyle 0–1, S Burke 0–1, M Gardiner 0–1.		F Hickey 0–5, M O'Riordan 0–2, L Stokes 0–1, B Burke 0–1, B Conway 0–1.	Referee: T Sugrue (Kerry)

16 June 1985 Quarter-final replay	Tipperary	2–12 – 2–9 (a.e.t.)	Clare	Páirc Uí Chaoimh, Cork
	F Kelly 0–11, L Stokes 1–1, D Foley 1–0.		P Burke 2–0, J Killeen 0–3, S Moloney 0–2, N Normoyle 0–2, J McGrtah 0–1, S Burke 0–1.	Referee: T Sugrue (Cork)

Semi-finals

23 June 1985 Semi-final	Kerry	2–18 – 0–9	Limerick	Frank Sheehy Park, Listowel
	M Sheehy 0–7, J O'Shea 2–0, P Spillane 0–4, D Moran 0–3, J Kennedy 0–2, T Dowd 0–1, T Doyle 0–1.		M Quish 0–5, A Shanahan 0–2, T Browne 0–1, T Cummins 0–1.	Referee: M Griffin (Clare)

23 June 1985 Semi-final	Tipperary	1–10 – 4–19	Cork	Semple Stadium, Thurles
	F Kelly 1–8, R Lannigan 0–1, B Burke 0–1.		D Barry 2–7, C O'Neill 1–4, T O'Sullivan 1–4, D Culloty 0–1, J Boylan 0–1, T Mannix 0–1, T Nation 0–1.	Referee: P Lane (Limerick)

Final

21 July 1985 Final	Cork	0–11 – 2–11	Kerry	Páirc Uí Chaoimh, Cork
	J Kerrigan 0–2, B Coffet 0–2, D Barry 0–2, C O'Neill 0–1, M McCarthy 0–1, T McCarthy 0–1, T Nation 0–1, M Beston 0–1.		M Sheehy 1–3, E Liston 1–2, P Spillane 0–2, J Kennedy 0–1, D Moran 0–1, T Dowd 0–1, J O'Shea 0–1.	Attendance: 28,524; Referee: J Moloney (Tipperary)

Quarter-finals		Semi-finals		Final
		Kerry	2–18
Waterford	0–7	Limerick	0–9
Limerick	2–10			Kerry	2–11
Tipperary (a.e.t.)	0–10; 2–12			Cork	0–11
Clare	1–7; 2–9	Tipperary	1–10
		Cork	4–19

=== Ulster Senior Football Championship ===
Preliminary round

19 May 1985 Preliminary round	Donegal	2–12 – 2–8	Down	MacCumhaill Park, Ballybofey
	M McHugh 1–7, K Keeney 1–1, S Maguire 0–1, Séamus Bonnar 0–1, M Lafferty 0–1, J McMullan 0–1.		L Heaney 1–0, J McCartan 1–0, A Rodgers 0–3, B Mason 0–3, P O'Rourke 0–1, A Quiery 0–1.	Referee: J Gough (Antrim)

Quarter-finals

26 May 1985 Quarter-final	Cavan	0–9 – 0–5	Antrim	Breffni Park, Cavan
	D Donohoe 0–3, D McDonnell 0–2, S Cole 0–1, J Reilly 0–1, P Kiernan 0–1, F Costello 0–1.		S Mulvenna 0–1, D Armstrong 0–1, R McGuckian 0–1, P Cunningham 0–1, D McCann 0–1.	Referee: K Cassidy (Derry)

2 June 1985 Quarter-final	Derry	1–9 – 1–8	Tyrone	Dean McGlinchey Park, Ballinascreen
	T McGuckian 0–4, DEclan McNicholl 1–0, Dermot McNicholl 0–2, C McKee 0–1, P Mackle 0–1, D Barton 0–1.		M Mallon 1–3, D Muldoon 0–3, E McKenna 0–1, D O'Hagan 0–1.	Referee: M Greenan (Cavan)

9 June 1985 Quarter-final	Armagh	2–13 – 0–5	Fermanagh	Athletic Grounds, Armagh
	G Houlihan 2–2, J Corvan 0–3, C Harney 0–2, B Canavan 0–2, J Kernan 0–1, K McNally 0–1, D Seeley 0–1, J Kernan 0–1.		P McGinnity 0–3, D Corrigan 0–2.	Referee: M Cranney (Down)

16 June 1985 Quarter-final	Monaghan	1–14 – 0–7	Donegal	St. Mary's Park, Castleblayney
	E McEneaney 0–8, E Murphy 1–0, D Byrne 0–3, E Hughes 0–2, R McCarron 0–1.		M McHugh 0–6, M Griffin 0–1.	Attendance: 12,000; Referee: D Campbell (Fermanagh)

Semi-finals

23 June 1985 Semi-final	Cavan	0–7 – 0–11	Derry	Athletic Grounds, Armagh
	D Donohoe 0–4, B Tierney 0–2, R Cullivan 0–1.		J Irwin 0–2, D Cassidy 0–2, P Murphy 0–1, D Barton 0–1, E McElhinney 0–1, Declan McNicholl 0–1, E Young 0–1, T McGuckian 0–1, C McKee 0–1.	Referee: K Murray (Monaghan)

30 June 1985 Semi-final	Monaghan	0–10 – 0–10	Armagh	Breffni Park, Cavan
	E Hughes 0–3, E McEneaney 0–2, G McCarville 0–2, H Clerkin 0–1, R McCarron 0–1, B Beggan 0–1.		D Seeley 0–4, B Canavan 0–2, J McCorry 0–1, A Short 0–1, G Houlihan 0–1, J Corvan 0–1.	Attendance: 15,000; Referee: D Campbell (Fermanagh)

7 July 1985 Semi-final replay	Monaghan	1–11 – 2–7	Armagh	Breffni Park, Cavan
	R McCarron 0–7, E McEneaney 1–2, E Hughes 0–1, D Byrne 0–1.		J Corvan 1–5, P Rafferty 1–0, F McMahon 0–1, J Kernan 0–1.	Referee: D Campbell (Fermanagh) and M Greenan (Cavan)

Final

21 July 1985 Final	Monaghan	2–9 – 0–8	Derry	St. Tiernach's Park, Clones
	E McEneaney 2–4, E Hughes 0–2, N O'Dowd 0–1, E Murphy 0–1, R McCarron 0–1.		T McGuckian 0–5, B Kealey 0–1, E Rafferty 0–1, D Burton 0–1.	Attendance: 20,000; Referee: M Greenan (Cavan)

Preliminary Round
Donegal	1–7
Down	2–8

Quarter-finals
Monaghan	1–14
Down	0–7
Armagh	2–13
Fermanagh	0–5
Tyrone	1–8
Derry	1–9
Cavan	0–9
Antrim	0–5

Semi-finals
Monaghan	0–10; 1–11
Armagh	0–10; 2–7
Derry	0–11
Cavan	0–7

Final
Monaghan	2–9
Derry	0–8

=== All-Ireland Senior Football Championship ===
Semi-finals

11 August 1985 Semi-final	Kerry	1–12 – 2–9	Monaghan	Croke Park, Dublin
	M Sheehy 0–4, P Spillane 0–3, G Power 1–0, J O'Shea 0–2, A O'Donovan 0–1, E Liston 0–1, T Dowd 0–1.		E McEneaney 0–5, E Murphy 1–0, R McCarron 0–3, M O'Dowd 1–0, E Hughes 0–1.	Attendance: 21,700; Referee: P Kavanagh (Meath)

18 August 1985 Semi-final	Dublin	1–13 – 1–13	Mayo	Croke Park, Dublin
	B Rock 1–7, C Redmond 0–2, T Conroy 0–1, J Kearns 0–1, M Kennedy 0–1, N Cafferty 0–1.		K McStay 0–6, N Durcan 1–0, TJ Kilgallon 0–3, WJ Padden 0–1, P Brogan 0–1, W Fitzpatrick 0–1, T Byrne 0–1.	Attendance: 40,295; Referee: J Moloney (Tipperary)

25 August 1985 Semi-final replay	Kerry	2–9 – 0–9	Monaghan	Croke Park, Dublin
	G Power 1–1, M Sheehy 0–4, E Liston 1–0, P Spillane 0–3, J O'Shea 0–1.		E McEneaney 0–5, R McCarron 0–2, M O'Dowd 0–1, B Murray 0–1.	Attendance: 53,529; Referee: P Kavanagh (Meath)

8 September 1985 Semi-final replay	Dublin	2–12 – 1–7	Mayo	Croke Park, Dublin
	K Duff 2–0, B Rock 0–5, J Kearns 0–4, J Ronayne 0–1, B Mullins 0–1, T Conroy 0–1.		P Brogan 1–1, K McStay 0–4, F Noone 0–1, N Durcan 0–1.	Attendance: 64,132; Referee: J Moloney (Tipperary)

Final

22 September 1985 Final	Kerry	2–12 – 2–8	Dublin	Croke Park, Dublin
	J O'Shea 1–3, T O'Dowd 1–1, M Sheehy 0–3, T Doyle 0–1, J Kennedy 0–1, P Spillane 0–2 D Moran 0–1.		J McNally 2–0, B Rock 0–3, T Conroy 0–2, J Kearns 0–2, T Carr 0–1.	Attendance: 69,289; Referee: P Kavanagh (Meath)

== Championship statistics ==
=== Miscellaneous ===
- The Kerry vs Limerick game was the first meeting between the teams since 1970.
- Dublin play Laois in the Leinster final for the first time since 1963.
- For the first time since 1955 both All Ireland semi-finals went to a replay and ended in draws the first day.

=== Scoring ===
Overall

Rank	Player	County	Tally	Total	Matches	Average
1	Barney Rock	Dublin	3–28	37	6	6.16
2	Eamonn McEneaney	Monaghan	3–26	35	6	5.83
3	Mikey Sheehy	Kerry	1–21	24	5	4.80
4	Franny Kelly	Tipperary	1–19	22	2	11.00
5	Kevin McStay	Mayo	0–19	19	4	4.75
6	Martin McHugh	Donegal	1–13	16	2	8
6	Jack O'Shea	Kerry	3–7	16	5	3.20
8	Dave Barry	Cork	2–9	15	2	7.50
8	Ray McCarron	Monaghan	0–15	15	6	2.50
10	Pat Spillane	Kerry	0–14	14	5	2.80

Top scorers in a single game

Rank	Player	Team	Tally	Total	Opposition
1	Dave Barry	Cork	2–7	13	Tipperary
2	Franny Kelly	Tipperary	1–8	11	Cork
2	Franny Kelly	Tipperary	0–11	11	Clare
4	Barney Rock	Dublin	2–4	10	Wexford
4	Eamonn McEneaney	Monaghan	2–4	10	Derry
4	Martin McHugh	Donegal	1–7	10	Down
4	Barney Rock	Dublin	1–7	10	Mayo
8	Ger Houlahan	Armagh	2–2	8	Fermanagh
8	John Corvan	Armagh	1–5	8	Monaghan
8	Brendan Lowry	Offaly	0–8	8	Dublin
8	Eamonn McEneaney	Monaghan	0–8	8	Donegal
