= List of Gaelic games clubs in Ireland =

This is a list of clubs in Ireland that play Gaelic games categorised by their governing bodies (GAA provincial council and GAA county). As of June 2025, there are currently 1,609 GAA clubs in Ireland.

Common abbreviations used in club names are:

- CC: Camogie Club or Cumann Camogaíochta
- CLG: Cumann Lúthchleas Gael (Gaelic Athletic Association)
- CPG: Cumann Peile Gaelach (Gaelic Football Club)
- GAA: Gaelic Athletic Association
- GAC: Gaelic Athletic Club (often denotes that more than one sport is played) Unsubstantiated claim, not an officially recognised abbreviation and used predominately in the north of Ireland
- GFC: Gaelic Football Club
- HC: Hurling Club or Handball Club
- HCC: Hurling and Camogie Club
- LGFC: Ladies' Gaelic Football Club
- LGFA: Ladies' Gaelic Football Association
- (H): Hurling (F) Football (D) Dual

== Connacht ==
=== Galway ===
- Abbeyknockmoy (H)
- Ahascragh-Fohenagh (H)
- An Spidéal (D)
- Annaghdown (D)
- Ardrahan (H)
- Ballinasloe (D)
- Ballinderreen (H)
- Ballygar Hurling (H)
- Barna (F)
- Beagh (H)
- Bearna/Na Forbacha (H)
- Caherlistrane (F)
- Caltra (F)
- Cappataggle (H)
- Cárna-Caiseal (F)
- Carnmore(H)
- An Cheathrú Rua (Carraroe) (F)
- Castlegar (H)
- Claregalway (F)
- Clarinbridge (D)
- Clifden (F)
- Naomh Pádraig, An Fháirche (Clonbur) (F)
- Corofin (F)
- Cortoon Shamrocks (F)
- Craughwell (D)
- Dunmore MacHales (F)
- Father Griffins-Éire Óg (F)
- Gaeil na Gaillimhe CLG (F)
- Glenamaddy
- Glinsk (F)
- Gort (H)
- Headford (F)
- Kilbeacanty (H)
- Kilconieron (H)
- Kilconly (F)
- Killanin (F)
- Killererin (F)
- Killimor (H)
- Killimordaly (H)
- Kilkerrin-Clonberne (F)
- Kilnadeema-Leitrim (H)
- Kiltormer (D)
- Kinvara (H)
- Liam Mellows (H)
- Loughrea (H)
- Loughrea Football
- Meelick/Eyrecourt (D)
- Menlo Emmetts (H)
- Menlough (F)
- Míchael Breathnach (D)
- Michael Cusacks (H)
- Milltown (F)
- Monivea Abbey (F)
- Mountbellew-Moylough (F)
- Mountbellew-Moylough-Skehana (H)
- Moycullen
- Mullagh (H)
- Northern Gaels (F)
- Na Piarsaigh (F)
- Naomh Anna (F)
- Oileáin Árann (Aran Islands) (F)
- Oranmore-Maree (D)
- Oughterard (F)
- Pádraig Pearse's (D)
- Portumna
- Rahoon-Newcastle (H)
- Renvyle (F)
- Salthill-Knocknacarra (D)
- Sarsfields (D)
- Skehana (H)
- Sylane (F)
- St Brendan's (F)
- St Colman's (F)
- St Gabriel's (F)
- St James' (F)
- St Mary's, Athenry (D)
- St Michael's (F)
- St Thomas' (H)
- Tommy Larkin's (D)
- Tuam Hurling (H)
- Tuam Stars (F)
- Turloughmore (H)
- Tynagh-Abbey-Duniry
- Williamstown

==== Defunct Galway Clubs ====
- St Grellan's (F)
- St Columba's (H)
- St Sourney's (F)
- St Patricks, Coldwood (F)
- St Cuans (H)

=== Leitrim ===
- Allen Gaels
- Annaduff
- Aughavas
- Aughawillan
- Aughnasheelin
- Balinaglera
- Ballinamore Seán O'Heslin's
- Bornacoola
- Carrigallen
- Cloone
- Drumkeerin
- Drumreilly
- Eslin
- Glencar-Manorhamilton
- Glenfarne/Kiltyclogher
- Gortletteragh
- Kiltubrid
- Leitrim Gaels
- Melvin Gaels
- Mohill
- St Caillin's
- St Mary's Kiltoghert
- St Osnett's
- St Patrick's

=== Mayo ===
- Achill
- Ardagh
- Ardnaree Sarsfields
- Aghamore
- Balla
- Ballaghadereen
- Ballina Stephenites GFC
- Ballina James Stephens HC
- Ballinrobe
- Ballintubber
- Ballycastle
- Ballycroy
- Ballyhaunis
- Ballyvary
- Belmullet
- Bohola Moy Davitts
- Bonniconlon
- Breaffy
- Burrishoole
- Caiseal Gaels HC
- Castlebar Mitchels
- Castlebar HC
- Charlestown Sarsfields
- Cill Chomáin
- Claremorris
- Crossmolina Deel Rovers
- Davitts
- Eastern Gaels
- Garrymore
- Islandeady
- Hollymount/Carramore
- Kilfian
- Killala
- Kilmeena
- Kilmovee Shamrocks
- Kiltane
- Kiltimagh
- Knockmore
- Lacken
- Lahardane McHales
- Louisburgh
- Mayo Gaels
- Moygownagh
- Moytura HC
- Parke-Keelogues-Crimlin
- Shrule-Glencorrib
- Swinford
- The Neale
- Tooreen HC
- Tuar Mhic Éadaigh
- Westport

=== Roscommon ===
- Athleague
- Boyle
- Clann na nGael
- Ballinameen
- Castlerea St Kevin's
- Creggs
- Éire Óg
- Elphin
- Four Roads
- Fuerty
- Kilbride
- Kilglass Gaels
- Kilmore
- Michael Glaveys
- Oran Hurling
- Oran Football
- Padraig Pearses
- Roscommon Gaels
- Shannon Gaels
- St Aidan's
- St Barry's
- St Brigid's
- St Ciaran's
- St Croan's
- St Dominic's
- St Faithleach's
- St Joseph's
- St Michael's
- St Ronan's
- Shannon Gaels
- Strokestown
- Tremane
- Tulsk Lord Edwards
- Western Gaels

=== Sligo ===
- Ballisodare
- Ballymote
- Bunninadden
- Calry/St Joseph's
- Castleconnor
- Cloonacool
- Coolaney/Mullinabreena
- Coolera/Strandhill
- Curry
- Drumcliffe/Rosses Point
- Easkey
- Eastern Harps
- Enniscrone/Kilglass
- Geevagh
- Naomh Eoin
- Owenmore Gaels
- Shamrock Gaels
- St Farnan's
- St John's
- St Mary's
- St Michael's
- St Molaise Gaels
- St Patrick's
- Tourlestrane
- Tubbercurry
- Western Gaels

== Leinster ==
=== Carlow ===
- Asca (F)
- Bagenalstown Gaels (D)
- Ballinabranna (F)
- Ballon (F)
- Ballinkillen (H)
- Burren Rangers (H)
- Carlow Town HC (H)
- Clonmore (F)
- Éire Óg (F)
- Fenagh (F)
- Fighting Cocks (F)
- Grange (F)
- Kildavin/Clonegal (D)
- Kilbride (F)
- Leighlinbridge (F)
- Mount Leinster Rangers (D)
- Naomh Bríd (H)
- Naomh Eoin (D)
- O'Hanrahan's (F)
- Old Leighlin (F)
- Palatine (F)
- Rathvilly (F)
- St Mullin's (H)
- Setanta (H)
- St Patrick's (F)
- Tinryland (F)

=== Dublin ===
- Ballinteer Saint Johns Dublin 16
- Ballyboden St. Enda's GAA Firhouse Rd Dublin 24
- Ballyboughal N. Co Dublin
- Ballyfermot de la Salle Dublin 10
- Ballymun Kickhams Dublin 11
- Bank of Ireland
- Beann Éadair (Howth) Dublin 13
- Cabinteely GAA (Cabinteely, Kilboggett Park) Dublin 18
- Castleknock Dublin 15
- Civil Service GFC Islandbridge Dublin 8
- Civil Service HC Islandbridge Dublin 8
- Clann Mhuire Naul N. Co Dublin
- Clanna Gael Fontenoy Ringsend Dublin 4
- Clontarf Dublin 3
- Commercials Hurling Club (Rathcoole) S. Co Dublin
- Craobh Chiaráin Donnycarney & Clonshaugh Dublin 17
- Croi Ro Naofa Killinarden Estate Dublin 24
- Crumlin Crumlin Dublin 12
- Cuala Dalkey & Glenageary S. Co Dublin
- Erin go Bragh Clonsilla & Porterstown Dublin 15
- Erin's Isle Finglas Dublin 11
- Faughs Tymon North Dublin 6w
- Fingal Ravens, Rolestown N. Co Dublin
- Fingallians Swords North Co Dublin
- Foxrock–Cabinteely GAA
- Garda Westmanstown Gaels
- Garristown North Co Dublin
- Geraldine P. Morans (Sallynoggin, Cornelscourt & Foxrock) S. Co Dublin
- Good Counsel Liffey Gaels Suir Rd, Drimnagh & Rialto Dublin 8 and Dublin 12
- Innisfails Balgriffin Dublin 13
- Kevins Donore Avenue, Liberties Dublin 8
- Kilmacud Crokes Stillorgan S. Co Dublin
- Lucan Sarsfields South Co Dublin
- Man O'War Balrothery, Oberstown / Man-o-War, N. Co Dublin
- Na Dubh Ghall (Baldoyle) Dublin 13
- Na Fianna Mobhi Rd, Glasnevin Dublin 11
- Na Gaeil Aeracha Marino, Dublin 3
- Na Gaeil Óga
- Naomh Barróg Killbarrack Dublin 5
- Naomh Fionnbarra Cabra Dublin 11
- St. Maur's Rush N. Co Dublin
- Naomh Mearnóg Portmarnock N. Co Dublin
- Naomh Ólaf Ballaly Dublin 14
- O'Dywers Balbriggan N. Co Dublin
- O'Tooles Darndale Dublin 17
- Parnells Coolock Dublin 5
- Portobello, Dublin 6
- Raheny Dublin 5
- Ranelagh Gaels Dublin 6
- Réalt Dearg Drimnagh /Long Mile Road
- Robert Emmets, Perrystown Dublin 12
- Round Towers Clondalkin Dublin 22
- Round Towers, Lusk N. Co Dublin
- Rosmini Gaels Drumcondra, Dublin 9
- Scoil Uí Chonaill North Inner City-Clontarf Dublin 3
- Setanta Hurling Club (Dublin) (Ballymun) Dublin 11
- Shankill Shankill
- Skerries Harps N. Co Dublin
- St Annes Bohernabreena-South Tallaght Dublin 24
- St Brendan's Grangegorman - Dublin 7
- St Brigid's (Castleknock) Dublin 15
- St. Colmcille's (Balheary) N. Co Dublin
- St Finian's, Swords Swords N. Co Dublin
- St Finnian's (Newcastle) S. Co Dublin
- St James Gaels/An Caislean Walkinstown-Lower Crumlin Dublin 12
- St Joseph's/OCB Sherrif St-North Wall Dublin 1
- St Jude's Willington-Templeogue Dublin 6w
- St Kevin's Killians (Kilnamanagh-Kingswood/Newlands Cross) Dublin 24
- St Margaret's Kilreesk N. Co Dublin
- St Mark's Springfield Estate, West Tallaght Dublin 24
- St Mary's, Saggart Saggart S. Co Dublin
- St Monica's (Edenmore) Dublin 5
- St Oliver Plunketts/Eoghan Ruadh Ashtown Dublin 7
- St Patrick's (D) Donabate N. Co Dublin
- St Patrick's (P) Palmerstown Dublin 20
- St. Peregrines Blakestown-Mulhuddart Dublin 15
- St. Sylvesters Malahide N. Co Dublin
- St Vincents Marino, Dublin 3
- Starlights (Collinstown & Santry) N. Co Dublin
- Stars of Erin (Glencullen) S. Co Dublin
- Templeogue Synge Street (Synge St. & Dolphins Barn-Terenure) Dublin 6 and Dublin 8
- Thomas Davis Tallaght Dublin 24
- Trinity Gaels Drumnigh, Old Portmarnock Rd. N. Co Dublin
- Tyrrelstown Tyrellstown, North Co. Dublin
- Wanderers Rockbrook, Rathfarnham Dublin 16
- Whitehall Colmcille Dublin 9
- Wild Geese (Oldtown) N. Co Dublin

=== Kildare ===
- Allenwood
- Ardclough
- Athgarvan
- Athy
- Ballykelly
- Ballymore Eustace
- Ballyteague
- Broadford
- Capagh
- Caragh
- Carbury
- Castledermot
- Castlemitchell
- Celbridge
- Cill Daingin
- Clane
- Clogherinkoe
- Coill Dubh
- Confey
- Curragh Camp
- Eadestown
- Ellistown
- Grangeolvin
- Johnstownbridge
- Kilcock
- Kilcullen
- Kill
- Leixlip
- Maynooth
- Military College
- Milltown
- Monasterevin
- Moorefield
- Naas
- Nurney
- Raheens
- Rathangan
- Rathcoffey
- Raheen
- Robertstown
- Round Towers
- Sallins
- Sarsfields
- St Edward's
- St Kevin's
- St Laurence's
- Straffan
- Suncroft
- Twomilehouse

=== Kilkenny ===
- Ballyhale Shamrocks
- Barrow Rangers
- Bennettsbridge
- Blacks & Whites
- Carrickshock
- Carrigeen
- Clara
- Cloneen
- Conahy Shamrocks
- Danesfort
- Dicksboro
- Dunnamaggin
- Emeralds
- Erin's Own
- Fenians Johnstown
- Galmoy
- Glenmore
- Graignamanagh
- Graigue–Ballycallan
- James Stephens
- John Lockes
- Kilmacow
- Kilmoganny (F)
- Lisdowney
- Mooncoin
- Muckalee (F)
- Mullinavat
- O'Loughlin Gaels
- Piltown
- Railyard (F)
- Rower–Inistiogue
- Slieverue
- St Lachtain's
- St Martin's
- St Patrick's, Ballyragget
- Thomastown
- Threecastles
- Tullaroan
- Tullogher–Rosbercon
- Young Irelands
- Windgap

=== Laois ===
- Abbeyleix
- Annanough
- Arles–Kilcruise
- Arles–Killeen
- Ballinakill
- Ballyfin
- Ballylinan
- Ballypickas
- Ballyroan Abbey
- Ballyroan
- Barrowhouse
- Borris-in-Ossory
- Camross
- Castletown
- Clonad
- Clonaslee–St Manman's
- Clough–Ballacolla
- Courtwood
- Crettyard
- Emo
- Errill
- Graiguecullen
- The Harps
- The Heath
- Kilcavan
- Kilcotton
- Killeshin
- Kyle
- Mountmellick
- O'Dempsey's
- Park–Ratheniska
- Portarlington
- Portlaoise
- Rathdowney
- Rathdowney–Errill
- The Rock
- Rosenallis
- Shanahoe
- Slieve Bloom
- Spink
- St Fintan's, Colt
- St Fintan's, Mountrath
- St Joseph's
- Stradbally
- Timahoe
- Tinnahinch
- Trumera

=== Longford ===
- Abbeylara (F)
- Ardagh Moydow (F)
- Ballymahon (F)
- Ballymore (F)
- Carrickedmond (F)
- Cashel (F)
- Clonguish (D)
- Colmcille (F)
- Dromard (F)
- Killoe Young Emmets (F)
- Fr. Manning Gaels (F)
- Kenagh (F)
- Legan Sarsfields (F)
- Longford Slashers (D)
- Mostrim (D)
- Mullinalaghta St Columbas (F)
- Rathcline (F)
- Seán Connollys (F)
- St. Brigids Killashee (F)
- St. Marys Granard (F)
- St. Munis Forgney (F)
- Young Grattans (F)

=== Louth ===
- Annaghminnon Rovers
- Na Piarsaigh/Blackrock
- Clan na Gael
- Cooley Kickhams
- Cúchulainn Gaels
- Dreadnots
- Dowdallshill
- Dundalk Gaels
- Dundalk Young Irelands
- Geraldines
- Glen Emmets
- Glyde Rangers
- Hunterstown Rovers
- John Mitchells
- Kilkerly Emmets
- Knockbridge
- Lann Léire
- Mattock Rangers
- Naomh Fhionnbarra
- Naomh Máirtín
- Naomh Malachi
- Naomh Moninne
- Newtown Blues
- O'Connells
- Oliver Plunketts
- O'Raghallaighs
- Pearse Óg
- Roche Emmets
- Seán McDermott's
- Seán O'Mahony's
- Stabannon Parnells
- St Bride's
- St Fechin's
- St. Joseph's
- St. Kevin's
- St Mary's, Ardee
- St Mochta's
- St.Nicholas
- St Patrick's
- Westerns
- Wolfe Tones

=== Meath ===
- Ballinabrackey
- Ballinlough
- Ballivor
- Bective
- Blackhall Gaels
- Boardsmill
- Carnaross
- Castletown
- Clann na nGael
- Clonard
- Cortown
- Curraha
- Donaghmore/Ashbourne
- Drumbaragh
- Drumconrath
- Drumree
- Dunderry
- Dunsany
- Duleek/Bellewstown
- Dunshaughlin
- Eastern Gaels GAC
- Gaeil Colmcille
- Kilbride
- Kildalkey
- Killyon
- Kilmainham
- Kilmainhamwood
- Kilmessan
- Kilskyre
- Kiltale
- Longwood
- Meath Hill
- Moynalty
- Moynalvey
- Moylagh
- Na Fianna
- Navan O'Mahony's
- Nobber
- Oldcastle
- Rathkenny
- Rathmolyon
- Ratoath
- Seneschalstown
- Simonstown Gaels
- Skryne
- Slane
- St Brigid's
- St Colmcille's
- St Mary's
- St Michael's
- St Patrick's
- St Paul's
- St Peter's, Dunboyne
- St Ultan's
- St Vincent's
- Summerhill
- Syddan
- Trim
- Walterstown
- Wolfe Tones

=== Offaly ===
- Ballinamere
- Ballycommon
- Ballycumber
- Ballyfore
- Ballyskenagh
- Ballinagar
- Belmont
- Birr
- Bracknagh
- Brosna Gaels
- Cappincur
- Carrig and Riverstown
- Clara
- Clareen
- Clonbullogue
- Coolderry
- Crinkle
- Daingean
- Doon
- Drumcullen
- Edenderry
- Erin Rovers
- Ferbane
- Gracefield
- Kilclonfert
- Kilcormac–Killoughey
- Killeigh
- Kilurin
- Kinnitty
- Lusmagh
- Raheen
- Rhode
- Shamrocks
- Shannonbridge
- Shinrone
- St Carthage
- St Rynagh's
- Tubber
- Tullamore
- Walsh Island

=== Westmeath ===
- Athlone
- Ballinagore
- Ballymore
- Ballycomoyle
- Ballynacargy
- Brownstown
- Bunbrosna
- Castledaly
- Castlepollard
- Castletown/Finea/Coole/Whitehall
- Castletown-Geoghegan
- Caulry
- Clonkill
- Coralstown-Kinnegad
- Crookedwood
- Cullion
- Delvin
- The Downs
- Fr. Dalton's
- Garrycastle
- Kilbeggan Shamrocks
- Killucan
- Lough Lene Gaels
- Loughnavalley
- Maryland
- Milltown
- Milltownpass
- Moate All Whites
- Mullingar Shamrocks
- Multyfarnham
- Na Piarsaigh Westmeath
- Raharney
- Ringtown
- Rosemount
- St Brigids's
- St Joseph's
- St Loman's
- St Malachy's
- St Mary's Rochfortbridge
- St Oliver Plunkett's
- St Paul's
- Shandonagh
- Southern Gaels
- Tang
- Tubberclair
- Turin
- Tyrrellspass

=== Wexford ===
- Adamstown
- Ballyfad
- Ballyhogue
- Bannow–Ballymitty
- Blackwater St Brigid's
- Buffers Alley
- Castletown Liam Mellows
- Clonard
- Clonee
- Clongeen
- Cloughbawn
- Craanford
- Crossabeg–Ballymurn
- Davidstown–Courtnacuddy
- Duffry Rovers
- Faythe Harriers
- Ferns St Aidan's
- Geraldine O'Hanrahans
- Glynn-Barntown
- Gusserane O'Rahilly's
- Horeswood
- HWH Bunclody
- Kilanerin–Ballyfad
- Kilmore
- Marshalstown-Castledockrell
- Naomh Éanna, Gorey
- Our Lady's Island
- Oulart–The Ballagh
- Oylegate–Glenbrien
- Rapparees-Starlights
- Ratharogue–Cushinstown
- Rathnure St Anne's
- Réalt Na Mara–Ballygarrett
- Sarsfields
- Shamrocks
- Shelmaliers
- St Anne's, Rathangan
- St Fintan's
- St Joseph's
- St James'
- St Martin's
- St Mary's Maudlintown
- St Mary's Rosslare
- St Mogues, Fethard
- Taghmon–Camross
- Tara Rocks
- Volunteers St John's

=== Wicklow ===
- Annacurra
- Arklow Rock Parnells
- Arklow Geraldines, Ballmoney
- Ashford
- Aughrim
- Avoca
- Avondale
- Ballymanus
- Ballinacor
- Barndarrig
- Baltinglass
- Blessington
- Bray Emmets
- Carnew Emmets
- Coolkenno
- Donard Glen
- Dunlavin
- Enniskerry
- Éire Óg Greystones
- Fergal Óg's
- Glenealy
- Hollywood
- Cill Bhride
- Kilcoole
- Kiltegan
- Knockananna
- Lacken
- Laragh
- Newtownmountkennedy
- Newcastle
- Rathnew
- Stratford/ Grangecon
- Tinahely
- An Tóchar
- Shillelagh
- St Patrick's
- Valleymount
- Kilcoole
- Kilmacanogue

== Munster ==
=== Clare ===
- Ballyea (H)
- Ballyvaughan-Fanore (F)
- Bodyke (H)
- Broadford (H)
- Clarecastle (D)
- Clonbony (H)
- Clondegad (F)
- Clonlara (H)
- Clooney-Quin (D)
- Coolmeen (F)
- Cooraclare (F)
- Corofin (D)
- Cratloe (D)
- Crusheen (H)
- Doonbeg (F)
- Éire Óg, Ennis (D)
- Ennistymon (D)
- Feakle (H)
- Inagh-Kilnamona (H)
- Kildysart (F)
- Kilfenora (F)
- Kilkee-Bealaha (H)
- Killanena (H)
- Killimer (F)
- Kilmaley (H)
- Kilmihil (F)
- Kilmurry-Ibrickane (F)
- Kilrush Shamrocks (F)
- Liscannor (F)
- Lissycasey (F)
- Michael Cusack's, Carron (F)
- Moy (F)
- Naomh Eoin, Cross (F)
- Newmarket-on-Fergus (H)
- O'Callaghan's Mills (H)
- O'Curry's, Doonaha (F)
- Ogonnelloe (H)
- Parteen-Meelick (D)
- Ruan (H)
- Scariff (H)
- Shannon Gaels, Labasheeda (F)
- Sixmilebridge (H)
- Smith O'Brien's, Killaloe (H)
- St. Breckan's, Lisdoonvarna (F)
- St. Joseph's, Doora-Barefield (D)
- St. Joseph's, Miltown Malbay (F)
- St. Senan's, Kilkee (F)
- The Banner, Ennis (D)
- Tubber (H)
- Tulla (H)
- Whitegate (H)
- Wolfe Tones, Shannon (D)

=== Cork ===
==== Avondhu (North Cork) ====
- Abbey Rovers
- Araglen
- Awbeg Rangers
- Ballyclough
- Ballygiblin
- Ballyhea
- Ballyhooly
- Buttevant
- Castletownroche
- Charleville
- Churchtown (defunct)
- Clyda Rovers
- Deel Rovers
- Doneraile
- Dromina
- Fermoy
- Glanworth
- Grange
- Harbour Rovers
- Killavullen
- Kildorrery
- Kilshannig
- Kilworth
- Liscarroll (defunct)
- Liscarroll Churchtown Gaels
- Mallow
- Milford
- Mitchelstown
- Newtownshandrum
- Rathluirc Rovers (defunct)
- Shanballymore

==== Béara (West Cork) ====
- Adrigole
- Bere Island
- Castletownbere
- Garnish
- Glengarriff
- Urhan

==== Carbery (South West Cork) ====
- Argideen Rangers
- Ballinascarthy
- Bandon
- Bantry Blues
- Barryroe
- Carbery Rangers
- Castlehaven
- Clann na nGael
- Clonakilty
- Diarmuid Ó Mathúna's
- Dohenys
- Gabriel Rangers
- Goleen
- Ilen Rovers
- Kilbree
- Kilbrittain
- Kilmacabea
- Kilmeen
- Muintir Bháire
- Newcestown
- O'Donovan Rossa
- Randal Óg
- Sam Maguire's GAA (Underage Amalgamation team)
- St Colum's
- St James'
- St Mary's
- St Oliver Plunkett's
- Tadhg MacCarthaigh

==== Carrigdhoun (South East Cork) ====
- Ballinhassig
- Ballygarvan
- Ballymartle
- Belgooly
- Carrigaline
- Courcey Rovers
- Crosshaven
- Kinsale
- Shamrocks
- Tracton
- Valley Rovers

==== Imokilly (East Cork) ====
- Aghada
- Ballinacurra
- Bride Rovers
- Carrignavar
- Carrigtwohill
- Castlelyons
- Castlemartyr
- Cloyne
- Cobh
- Dungourney
- Erin's Own
- Fr. O'Neills
- Glanmire
- Glenbower Rovers
- Glenville
- Killeagh
- Lisgoold
- Midleton
- Russell Rovers
- Sarsfields
- St Catherine's
- St Ita's
- Watergrasshill
- Youghal

==== Muskerry (Mid Cork) ====
- Aghabullogue
- Aghinagh
- Ballincollig
- Béal Átha'n Ghaorthaidh
- Ballinora
- Blarney
- Canovee
- Clondrohid
- Cloughduv
- Donoughmore
- Dripsey
- Éire Óg
- Grenagh
- Gleann na Laoi
- Kilmurry
- Kilmichael
- Kilnamartyra
- Iveleary
- Inniscarra
- Laochra Óg
- Macroom
- Naomh Abán

==== Seandún (City Division) ====
- Ballinure
- Ballyphehane
- Bishopstown
- Blackrock
- Brian Dillons
- CIT
- Delaney Rovers
- Douglas
- Glen Rovers
- Laochra Aeracha
- Lough Rovers
- Mayfield
- Na Piarsaigh
- Nemo Rangers
- Passage West
- Rathpeacon
- Redmonds
- Rochestown
- St Finbarr's
- St Michael's
- St Nicholas'
- St Vincent's
- UCC
- Whitechurch
- White's Cross

==== Duhallow (North West Cork) ====
- Ballydesmond (F)
- Banteer (H)
- Boherbue (F)
- Castlemagner (D)
- Cullen (F)
- Dromtarriffe (D)
- Freemount (D)
- Glenlara (F)
- Kanturk (D)
- Kilbrin (D)
- Kiskeam (F)
- Knocknagree (F)
- Lismire (F)
- Lyre (F)
- Meelin (H)
- Millstreet (D)
- Newmarket (D)
- Rockchapel (F)
- St. John's (F)
- Tullylease (F)

=== Kerry ===
==== North Kerry ====
- Feale Rangers (divisional team)
- Shannon Rangers (divisional team)
- St Kieran's (divisional team)
- Abbeydorney (H)
- Asdee
- Ballydonoghue
- Ballyduff (D)
- Ballyheigue (H)
- Ballylongford
- Beale
- Brosna
- Castleisland Desmonds
- Causeway (H)
- Clounmacon
- Crotta O'Neill's (H)
- Duagh (D)
- Finuge
- Gale Rangers (defunct)
- Kilmoyley (H)
- Knockanure (defunct)
- Knocknagoshel
- Ladys Walk (H)
- Listowel Emmets
- Lixnaw (H)
- Moyvane
- St. Senan's
- Tarbert

==== West Kerry ====
- West Kerry (divisional team)
- An Ghaeltacht
- Annascaul
- Castlegregory
- Dingle
- Lispole

==== Mid Kerry ====
- Mid Kerry (divisional team)
- Beaufort
- Cromane
- Glenbeigh-Glencar
- Keel
- Laune Rangers
- Milltown/Castlemaine

==== East Kerry ====
- East Kerry (divisional team)
- Cordal
- Currow
- Dr Crokes (D)
- Firies
- Fossa
- Glenflesk
- Gneeveguilla
- Kilcummin
- Killarney Legion
- Listry
- Rathmore (D)
- Scartaglin
- Spa
- St Patrick's (H)

==== South Kerry ====
- South Kerry (divisional team)
- Caherdaniel (defunct)
- Derrynane (Now Sneem-Derrynane)
- Dromid Pearses
- Renard
- Skellig Rangers
- Sneem (Now Sneem-Derrynane)
- St. Mary's
- Valentia Young Islanders
- Waterville
- St Michael's/Foilmore

==== Kenmare District (South East Kerry) ====
- Kenmare District Team (divisional team)
- Kenmare Shamrocks (D)
- Kilgarvan (D)
- Templenoe
- Tuosist

==== Tralee / St Brendan's Board (North West Kerry) ====
- St Brendan’s (divisional team)
- Tralee (divisional team)
- Ardfert
- Austin Stacks
- Ballymacelligott
- Churchill
- John Mitchels
- Kerins O'Rahilly's
- Na Gaeil
- St Brendan’s
- St. Patrick's Blennerville
- Tralee Mitchels (defunct)
- Tralee Parnells (H)

=== Limerick ===
==== City Division ====
- Abbey Sarsfields
- Ballinacurra Gaels
- Ballybrown
- Claughaun
- Crecora/Manister
- Kildimo/Pallaskenry
- Milford (Defunct)
- Monaleen
- Mungret/St Paul's
- Na Piarsaigh
- Old Christians
- Patrickswell
- St. Patrick's
- Treaty Gaels Camogie Club

==== East Division ====
- Ahane
- Ballybricken
- Caherconlish
- Caherline
- Cappamore
- Doon
- Fedamore
- Kilteely-Dromkeen
- Knockane
- Murroe/Boher
- Oola
- Pallasgreen
- South Liberties

==== South Division ====
- Ballylanders
- Banogue
- Blackrock
- Bruff
- Bruree
- Camogue Rovers
- Castletown/Ballyagran
- Croom
- Dromin/Athlacca
- Effin
- Garryspillane
- Galbally
- Galtee Gaels
- Glenroe
- Hospital/Herbertstown
- Kilmallock
- Knockainey
- Staker Wallace

==== West Division ====
- Adare
- Askeaton
- Athea
- Ballysteen
- Cappagh
- Croagh-Kilfinny
- Dromcollogher/Broadford
- Fr Casey's (Abbeyfeale)
- Feenagh/Kilmeedy
- Feoghanagh/Castlemahon
- Gerald Griffins
- Glin
- Granagh/Ballingarry
- Kilcornan
- Killeedy
- Knockaderry
- Monagea
- Mountcollins
- Newcastle West
- Rathkeale
- St Kierans
- St. Senan's
- Templeglantine
- Tournafulla

=== Tipperary ===
- Aherlow
- Ardfinnan
- Arravale Rovers
- Ballina
- Ballinahinch
- Ballingarry
- Ballybacon–Grange
- Ballylooby–Castlegrace
- Ballyneale
- Ballyporeen
- Boherlahan–Dualla
- Borrisokane
- Borris–Ileigh
- Burgess
- Cahir
- Cappawhite
- Carrick Davins
- Carrick Swans
- Cashel King Cormacs
- Clerihan
- Clonakenny
- Clonmel Commercials
- Clonmel Óg
- Clonoulty–Rossmore
- Drom & Inch
- Dúrlas Óg
- Éire Óg Annacarty
- Emly
- Fethard
- Fr Sheehy's
- Galtee Rovers
- Glengar
- Golden–Kilfeakle
- Gortnahoe–Glengoole
- Grangemockler
- Holycross–Ballycahill
- Inane Rovers
- JK Bracken's
- Kildangan
- Killea
- Killenaule
- Kilruane MacDonagh's
- Kilsheelan–Kilcash
- Knockavilla–Donaskeigh Kickhams
- Knock
- Knockshegowna
- Lattin–Cullen
- Lorrha–Dorrha
- Loughmore–Castleiney
- Marlfield
- Moneygall
- Moycarkey–Borris
- Moyle Rovers
- Moyne–Templetuohy
- Mullinahone
- Nenagh Éire Og
- Newcastle
- Newport
- Portroe
- Rockwell Rovers
- Roscrea
- Rosegreen
- Sean Treacy's
- Shannon Rovers
- Silvermines
- Skeheenarinky
- Solohead
- St Mary's Clonmel
- St Patrick's
- Templederry
- Thomas MacDonagh's
- Thurles Gaels
- Thurles Sarsfields
- Toomevara
- Upperchurch–Drombane

=== Waterford ===
- Abbeyside–Ballinacourty
- Afane Cappoquin
- Ardmore
- Ballinameela
- Ballyduff Lower
- Ballyduff Upper
- Ballygunner
- Ballysaggart
- Brickey Rangers
- Butlerstown
- Colligan–Emmets
- Clashmore–Kinsalebeg
- Clonea Power–Rathgormack
- De La Salle
- Dungarvan
- Dunhill
- Erins Hope Dungarvan
- Erin's Own
- Fenor
- Ferrybank
- Gaultier
- Geraldines
- John Mitchels
- Kilgobinet
- Kill
- Kilmacthomas
- Kilrossanty
- Lismore
- Modeligo
- Mount Melleray
- Mount Sion
- The Nire–Fourmilewater
- Old Parish
- Passage
- Portlaw
- Rathgormack
- Rinn Ó gCuanach
- Roanmore
- Shandon Rovers
- Sliabh gCua–St Mary's
- Stradbally
- St Molleran's
- St Paul's
- St Saviour's
- Shamrocks
- Tallow
- Tourin–Ballinwillin
- Tramore

== Ulster ==
=== Antrim ===
- All Saints, Ballymena
- Ardoyne Kickham's
- Cardinal O'Donnell's
- Ballymoney
- Carey Faughs
- Clooney Gaels HC, Ahoghill
- Con Magee's
- Cushendun Emmets
- Creggan Kickhams
- Dunloy Cuchullain's
- Erin's Own, Cargin
- Éire Óg, Derriaghy
- Gort na Móna
- Glen Rovers
- Glenshesk
- Henry Joy McCracken's
- John Mitchel's
- Lagmore Gaels
- Lámh Dhearg
- Laochra Loch Lao
- Latharna Óg, Larne
- Loch Mór Dál gCais
- McQuillan's
- Michael Davitt's
- Michael Dwyer's
- Na Fuiseoige
- Naomh Eoin
- Naomh Mhuire, Aghagallon
- O'Donovan Rossa
- Oisín Glenariff
- Patrick Pearse's
- Patrick Sarsfields
- Roger Casement's
- Ruairí Óg
- Sean Martin's
- Sean McDermott's
- Sean Stinson's
- Loughgiel Shamrocks
- Shane O'Neill's, Glenarm
- St Agnes'
- St Brigid's
- St Comgall's
- St Enda's
- St Ergnat's
- St Gall's
- St James'
- St John's
- St Joseph's
- St Malachy's
- St Mary's, Aghagallon
- St Mary's GFC, Ahoghill
- St Mary's Rasharkin
- St Paul's
- St Patrick's, Lisburn
- St Teresa's, Belfast
- Tir-na-nÓg
- Wolfe Tones GAC, Greencastle

==== Defunct Antrim clubs ====
- McCracken's GAC, Ballymena
- St Patrick's GAC, Ballymena
- St Columba's, Greencastle
- Riverdale Rovers, Belfast

=== Armagh ===
- O'Neill's GAC, An Port Mór
- Annaghmore Pearses Gaelic Football Club (GFC)
- Cúchulainn's Hurling Club (HC), Armagh
- Armagh Harps
- Pearse Óg Gaelic Athletic Club (GAC), Armagh
- Ballyhegan Davitts
- Ballymacnab Round Towers
- St Brenda's Camogie Club, Ballymacnab
- Belleeks Laurence O'Toole's
- St Patrick's, Carrickcruppen
- Clady Sean South's
- Shane O'Neill's, Camloch
- Craobh Rua Camloch
- Clann Éireann, Lurgan
- Clonmore Robert Emmet's
- Collegeland O'Rahilly's
- Thomas Davis, Corrinshego
- Éire Óg, Craigavon
- Crosmaglen Rangers
- Culloville Blues
- Derrymacash St Enda's Camogie Club
- Derrynoose St Mochua's
- Dorsey Emmet's
- Dromintee St Patrick's
- Forkhill Peadar Ó Doirnín
- Granemore St Mary's
- Grange St Colmcille's
- High Moss Sarsfields
- Keady Michael Dwyer's
- Keady Lámh Dhearg HC
- Killeavy St Moninna's
- Lissummon
- Lurgan Clan na Gael
- Lurgan Sean Treacy's HC
- Madden Raparees
- St Joseph's Camogie Club, Madden
- Maghery Sean MacDermott's GAC
- Middletown Eoghan Ruadh (football), Na Fianna (hurling), St John's (camogie)
- Mullaghbawn Cuchullian's
- Mullabrack O'Donovan Rossa
- St Michael's, Newtownhamilton
- St Michael's GFC, Killean
- St Patrick's, Cullyhanna
- St Paul's, Lurgan
- St Peter's GAC, Lurgan
- Portadown St Malachy's HC
- Portadown Tír na nÓg
- Poyntzpass Redmond O'Hanlon's
- Silverbridge Harps
- Tullysaran O'Connell's
- Whitecross St. Killian's
- Wolfe Tones, Derrymacash

==== Defunct Armagh clubs ====
- Bessbrook Geraldines
- William O'Brien's, Camloch
- Carnally William Orr's
- CBS Armagh Past Pupils Union
- Clonalig Dillons
- Corlis Mitchels
- Creggan Red Hands
- Creggan Rovers
- Crievekiernan Harps
- Crossmaglen Geraldines
- Culloville Sons of O'Connell
- Culloville William O'Brien's
- Crossmaglen Plunketts
- Kevin Barry's, Cullyhanna
- Michael Davitts, Lurgan
- Eire Óg, Keady
- Jonesboro Border Rangers
- Mobane
- O'Donnell's, Armagh
- Phelim Brady's, Darkley
- Red Hands, Armagh
- Red Hands, Crossmaglen
- St Malachy's, Armagh
- Tir na nÓg, Armagh
- Tom Williams GFC, Cullyhanna-Dorsey
- Young Ireland, Armagh

=== Cavan ===
- Arva
- Bailieborough Shamrocks
- Ballinagh
- Ballyhaise
- Belturbet Rory O'Moore's
- Butlersbridge
- Castlerahan
- Cavan Gaels
- Cootehill Celtic
- Corlough
- Cornafean
- Crosserlough
- Cuchulainns
- Denn
- Drumalee
- Drumgoon
- Drumlane
- Drung
- East Cavan Gaels Hurling Club
- Gowna
- Kildallan
- Kill Shamrocks
- Killeshandra
- Killinkere
- Killygarry
- Kingscourt Stars
- Knockbride
- Lacken Celtic
- Laragh United
- Lavey
- Maghera MacFinns
- Mountnugent
- Mullahoran Dreadnoughts
- Mullahoran St Josephs Hurling Club
- Munterconnaught
- Pearse Óg Hurling Club
- Ramor United
- Redhills
- Shannon Gaels
- Shercock
- Swanlinbar
- Templeport

=== Derry ===
- Ardmore
- Ballerin
- Ballinascreen
- Ballinderry
- Ballymaguigan
- Banagher
- Bellaghy
- Castledawson
- Claudy
- Craigbane
- Culmore Cu Chulainns
- Desertmartin
- Doire Colmcille
- Doire Trasna
- Drum
- Drumsurn
- Dungiven
- Eoghan Rua
- Faughanvale
- Foreglen
- Glack
- Glen
- Glenullin
- Greenlough
- Kevin Lynch's Hurling Club
- Kilrea
- Lavey
- Limavady
- Lissan
- Loup
- Magherafelt
- Magilligan
- Moneymore
- Na Magha
- Newbridge
- Ógra Colmcille
- Seán Dolans
- Slaughtmanus
- Slaughtneil
- Steelstown
- Swatragh

=== Donegal ===
==== East Division ====
- Glenfin
- Glenswilly
- Letterkenny Gaels
- Naomh Pádraig, Lifford
- St Eunan's
- St Mary's, Convoy
- Red Hughs, Killygordon
- Robert Emmet's
- Seán Mac Cumhaill's
- Setanta

==== Inishowen Division ====
- Buncrana
- Burt
- Carndonagh
- Malin
- Moville
- Naomh Pádraig, Muff
- Urris
- Naomh Colmcille

==== North-West Division ====
- Cloich Cheann Fhaola
- Na Dúnaibh (Downings)
- Gaeil Fhánada (Fanad)
- Gaoth Dobhair
- Milford
- St Michael's
- Termon

==== South Division ====
- Aodh Ruadh, Ballyshannon
- Four Masters
- Naomh Bríd
- Naomh Ultan
- Pettigo
- Réalt Na Mara, Bundoran
- St Naul's

==== South-West Division ====
- Ardara
- An Clochán Liath
- Cill Chartha (Kilcar)
- Na Cealla Beaga (Killybegs)
- Naomh Columba
- Naomh Conaill
- Naomh Muire
- Na Rossa

=== Down ===
- Aghaderg-Ballyvarley
- An Riocht
- Annaclone
- Ardglass
- Aughlisnafin
- Atticall
- Ballela
- Ballycran
- Ballygalget
- Ballyholland
- Ballykinlar
- Ballymartin
- Bredagh
- Bright
- Bryansford
- St Mary's Burren
- Carryduff
- Castlewellan
- Clann na Banna
- Clonduff
- Darragh Cross
- Dromara
- Drumaness
- Drumgath
- Dundrum
- East Belfast
- Glasdrumman
- Glenn
- Kilclief
- Kilcoo
- Killyleagh
- Liatroim
- Longstone
- Loughinisland
- Mayobridge
- John Mitchel
- Mourne HC
- Newry Bosco
- Newry Shamrocks
- Portaferry
- Rostrevor
- Russell Gaelic Union, Downpatrick
- Saul
- Saval
- St John's
- St Michael's
- St Paul's
- Teconnaught
- Tullylish
- Warrenpoint

=== Fermanagh ===
- Aghadrumsee St Macartan's
- Belcoo O'Rahilly's
- Belnaleck Art McMurroughs
- Brookeborough Heber MacMahons
- Coa O'Dwyer's
- Derrygonnelly Harps
- Derrylin O'Connell's
- Devenish St Mary's
- Ederney St Joseph's
- Enniskillen Gaels
- Erne Gaels, Belleek
- Irvinestown St Molaise
- Kinawley Brian Boru's
- Knocks Grattan's (HC)
- Lisbellaw St Patrick's (HC)
- Lisnaskea Emmetts
- Maguiresbridge St Mary's
- Newtownbutler First Fermanaghs
- Roslea Shamrocks
- St Aidan's (HC)
- St Patrick's Donagh
- Teemore Shamrocks
- Tempo Maguires

=== Monaghan ===
- Aghabog
- Aughnamullen
- Ballybay Brothers Pearses
- Blackhill
- Carrickmacross Emmets
- Castleblayney Faughs
- Castleblayney Hurling Club
- Clontibret O'Neills
- Clones
- Corduff Gaels
- Cremartin Shamrocks
- Currin
- Donaghmoyne
- Doohamlet O'Neills
- Drumhowan Geraldines
- Éire Óg
- Emyvale
- Fergal O'Hanlon's
- Inniskeen
- Killanny Geraldines
- Killeevan
- Latton O'Rahilly's
- Magheracloone Mitchells
- Monaghan Harps
- Oram
- Rockcorry
- Scotstown
- Sean McDermotts
- Toome
- Truagh Gaels
- Tyholland

=== Tyrone ===
- Aghaloo O'Neill's
- Aghyaran St Davog's
- Ardboe O'Donovan Rossa
- Augher St Macartan's
- Badoney Ladies GFC
- Beragh Red Knights
- Brackaville Owen Roes
- Brocagh Emmetts
- Camowen Gaels HC
- Carrickmore St Colmcille's
- Castlederg St Eugene's
- Clann na nGael
- Clogher Éire Óg
- Clonoe O'Rahilly's
- Coalisland Na Fianna
- Cookstown Fr. Rock's
- Derrylaughan Kevin Barrys
- Derrytresk Fir An Chnoic GAC
- Donaghmore St Patrick's
- Dromore Naomh Eoin HC
- Dromore St Dympna's
- Drumquin Wolfe Tones
- Drumragh Sarsfields
- Dungannon Thomas Clarkes
- Eoghan Ruadh, Dungannon HC
- Edendork St Malachy's
- Eglish St Patrick's
- Éire Óg Carrickmore HC
- Errigal Ciarán
- Eskra Emmets
- Fintona Pearses
- Fintona Setanta HC
- Galbally Pearses
- Glenelly St Joseph's
- Gortin St Patrick's
- Kildress Wolfe Tones
- Killeeshil St Mary's
- Killyclogher St Mary's
- Killyman St Mary's
- Loughmacrory St Teresa's
- Moortown St Malachy's
- Moy Tír Na nÓg
- Naomh Colum Cille HC & CC
- St Eugene's
- Omagh St Enda's
- Owen Roe O'Neill's, Leckpatrick
- Pomeroy Plunketts
- Rock St Patrick's
- St Patrick's, Greencastle
- Sperrin Óg
- Stewartstown Harps
- Strabane Shamrocks HC
- Strabane Sigersons
- Tattyreagh St Patrick's
- Trillick St Macartan's
- Urney St Columba's

==== Defunct Tyrone clubs ====
- Benburb Eoghan Ruadh GAC
- Bundoran Junction Éire Ógs
- Coa HC
- Dregish Pearse Og
- Dunamanagh GAC
- Glassmullagh St Colmcille's HC
- Golan GAC
- Knocknagor CC
- Moy Phelim Roe GAC
- Newtownstewart St Eugene's
- Pearse Óg GAC, Leckpatrick
- Trillick MacDonagh's GFC
- Trillick Red Hands GFC

== See also ==
- List of Gaelic Games clubs in Mayo
