= 2017 Mayo Intermediate Football Championship =

Mayo I.F.C.
- Season: 2017
- Champions: ???
- Relegated: ???
- ???
- All Ireland ICFC: n/a

The 2017 Mayo Intermediate Football Championship is the 53rd edition of the Mayo GAA's second-tier gaelic football tournament for intermediate clubs in County Mayo, Ireland. Sixteen teams compete with the winner representing Mayo in the Connacht Intermediate Club Football Championship. The championship starts with a group stage and progresses to a knock out stage.

Moy Davitts won the title by beating Kiltimagh in the final.

Westport were the 2016 champions after defeating Kiltimagh in the final. In March 2017, they claimed the All-Ireland Club IFC title, defeating Meath champions St. Colmcille's.

== Group stage ==
All 16 teams enter the competition at this stage. The top 2 teams in each group go into the Quarter-Finals while the bottom team of each group will enter a Relegation Playoff. This year, all teams will play one home match, one away match and one match at a neutral venue.

=== Group A ===
Team	Pld	W	L	D	GF	GA	GD	Pts
Ardnaree	3	1	0	2	48	33	+15	4
Parke	3	2	1	0	42	51	−9	4
Belmullet	3	1	1	1	28	31	−3	3
Ballyhaunis	3	0	2	1	31	34	−3	1

Round 1

5/7/17; 14:00	Belmullet	0-10 - 1-7	Ardnaree	Tallagh; Referee: Jon Finn (Aghamore); Man of the Match: Ryan O'Donoghue
5/7/17; 14:00	Ryan O'Donoghue 0-6 (0-3f), Scott Kilker (1 '45), Damien Reilly, Colin Barrett, Michael Keane 0-1 each		John Timlin 0-4 (0-3f), Ronan Doherty 1-0, Brian Fitzpatrick, Stephen Tighe, Cian Burke 0-1 each	Tallagh; Referee: Jon Finn (Aghamore); Man of the Match: Ryan O'Donoghue

5/7/17; 14:00	Parke	2-9 - 1-11	Ballyhaunis	Ballyhaunis; Referee: Liam Higgins (Ballina); Man of the Match: Ronan Carolan
5/7/17; 14:00	Ronan Carolan 1-1, John Cloherty 1-0, Raymond Neary 0-3 (0-2f), Pat Lynch 0-2f, Simon Cloherty, Darren Durkan, Chris Kerins 0-1 each		Eamon Phillips 1-4 (0-2f), Keith Higgins and Jason Coyne (0-1f) 0-2 each, Eoghan Collins (0-1f), Cathal Carney (0-1f), Joe Sutton 0-1 each	Ballyhaunis; Referee: Liam Higgins (Ballina); Man of the Match: Ronan Carolan

Round 2

6/17/17; 18:30	Ardnaree	1-9 - 1-9	Ballyhaunis	Ardnaree; Referee: Mel Kenny (Westport); Man of the Match: Keith Higgins

6/17/17; 19:00	Parke	2-10 - 1-8	Belmullet	Parke; Referee: Jon Finn (Aghamore); Man of the Match: Ray Neary

Round 3

10/1/17; 14:00	Ardnaree	4-14 - 0-11	Parke	Knockmore

10/1/17; 14:00	Belmullet	1-4 - 0-5	Ballyhaunis	Ballina

=== Group B ===
Team	Pld	W	L	D	GF	GA	GD	Pts
Islandeady	3	2	0	1	57	35	+22	5
Mayo Gaels	3	2	1	0	47	44	+3	4
Shrule-Glencorrib	3	1	1	1	50	51	−1	3
Swinford	3	0	3	0	40	64	−24	0

Round 1

5/6/17; 17:00	Islandeady	1-14 - 0-7	Mayo Gaels	Mayo Abbey; Referee: F Flynn (Aghamore); Man of the Match: Danny McGowan
5/6/17; 17:00	Danny McGowan 0-4 (0-2f), Johnny Concannon 1-1, Brendan Gibbons 0-3, Darragh Joyce 0-2 (0-1f), Seamie Lally, Peter Collins, Dylan Gallagher, Pat Carolan 0-1 each		Adam Gallagher 0-3 (0-1f), Mally Byrne 0-2, Kevin Lynch and Alan Morris 0-1 each	Mayo Abbey; Referee: F Flynn (Aghamore); Man of the Match: Danny McGowan

5/7/17; 16:00	Swinford	1-14 - 1-15	Shrule-Glencorrib	Swinford; Referee: John Walker (Kilcommon); Man of the Match: Mark Ronaldson
5/7/17; 16:00	Liam Moran 0-8 (0-4f), Jason McLoughlin 1-2, Michael Prendergast 0-3, Kevin McShea 0-1		Mark Ronaldson 1-7 (0-2f), Evan Cawley 0-3 (0-2f), Stephen Mullin 0-2, Eoghan Hennelly, Eoin Ronaldson, Nathan McGhee 0-1 each	Swinford; Referee: John Walker (Kilcommon); Man of the Match: Mark Ronaldson

Round 2

6/18/17; 14:00	Shrule-Glencorrib	3-8 - 1-16	Mayo Gaels	Shrule Community Ground; Referee: Mel Kenny (Westport); Man of the Match: Adam Gallagher

6/18/17; 16:00	Islandeady	3-16 - 0-13	Swinford	Islandeady; Referee: Liam Higgins (Ballina); Man of the Match: Darragh Joyce

Round 3

9/30/17; 16:30	Shrule-Glencorrib	1-12 - 0-15	Islandeady	Tourmakeady

9/30/17; 16:30	Mayo Gaels	2-15 - 0-10	Swinford	Kiltimagh

=== Group C ===
Team	Pld	W	L	D	GF	GA	GD	Pts
Louisburgh	3	2	0	1	45	36	+9	5
Burrishoole	3	1	1	1	41	40	+1	3
Bonniconlon	3	1	1	1	48	48	0	3
The Neale	3	0	2	1	43	53	−10	1

Round 1

5/6/17; 19:00	Louisburgh	0-18 - 1-9	The Neale	The Neale; Referee: Benny Holmes (Ballina); Man of the Match: Alan Moran
5/6/17; 19:00	Kevin Gibbons 0-4 (0-2f), Padraic O'Malley and Austin O'Malley 0-3 each, James Gibbons 0-2, Alan Moran, Stephen O'Grady, Paul McDonnell, James Dowd (0-1f), Michael Gibbons, John Reilly 0-1 each		Aidan O'Sullivan 1-2, Stephen Conroy (0-1f) and Tommy Conroy 0-2 each, David McGrath, Simon Ryan (0-1f), Daniel Keane 0-1 each	The Neale; Referee: Benny Holmes (Ballina); Man of the Match: Alan Moran

5/7/17; 14:00	Bonniconlon	1-10 - 2-11	Burrishoole	Bonniconlon; Referee: Paul Lydon (Kiltimagh); Man of the Match: Jason Doherty
5/7/17; 14:00	David Walsh 1-4 (0-3f), Conor Igoe and Ronan Neary 0-2 each, Ronan Conlon and Richard McKenzie 0-1 each		Fintan McManamon 2-1, Jason Doherty 0-5 (0-2f), David Hanley 0-2, Ciaran McManamon, Alan Ryder, Padraic McManamon 0-1 each	Bonniconlon; Referee: Paul Lydon (Kiltimagh); Man of the Match: Jason Doherty

Round 2

6/17/17; 17:30	Burrishoole	0-16 - 2-10	The Neale	Newport; Referee: Paul Lydon (Kiltimagh); Man of the Match: Jason Doherty

6/18/17; 14:00	Louisburgh	1-13 - 0-16	Bonniconlon	Louisburgh; Referee: Jon Finn (Aghamore); Man of the Match: Ronan Neary

Round 3

10/1/17; 14:00	Louisburgh	0-11 - 1-5	Burrishoole	Islandeady

10/1/17; 14:00	Bonniconlon	2-13 - 1-12	The Neale	Connacht GAA Centre

=== Group D ===
Team	Pld	W	L	D	GF	GA	GD	Pts
Moy Davitts	3	3	0	0	84	37	+47	6
Kiltimagh	3	2	1	0	64	41	+23	4
Castlebar Mitchels B	3	1	2	0	45	84	−39	2
Tourmakeady	3	0	3	0	36	67	−31	0

Round 1

5/7/17; 14:00	Moy Davitts	2-14 - 1-14	Kiltimagh	Foxford; Referee: Garryowen McMahon (Davitts); Man of the Match: Brian Reape
5/7/17; 14:00	Brian Reape 1-6 (0-4f), Liam Byrne 1-1, Jamie Mulderrig (0-1f) and Oisin McHugh 0-2 each, Alan Bourke, Anthony Jordan, Brian Heneghan 0-1 each		TJ Byrne 1-0, Brian Gallagher (0-3f), David Lydon, Ronan Malee (0-3f) 0-3 each, Damien Gallagher (1 '45), Paul Kelly, Ciaran Charlton, Cillian Finn, Steve McDonnell 0-1 each	Foxford; Referee: Garryowen McMahon (Davitts); Man of the Match: Brian Reape

5/7/17; 14:00	Castlebar Mitchels B	2-18 - 2-10	Tourmakeady	Castlebar; Referee: Peter Geraghty (Swinford); Man of the Match: Eamonn Tiernan
5/7/17; 14:00	Eamonn Tiernan 0-6, Rhyne Collins and James Byrne 1-0 each, Shane Dolan and Kevin Filan (0-2f) 0-3 each, Matthew McCormack, Mark McHugh, Anthony O'Boyle, Richie Feeney (0-1f), Robert Fallon, Calum Kyne 0-1 each		Kevin Dolan 1-5 (1-0 pen, 0-4f), Darragh McConnell 1-0, Brendan Prendergast 0-2f, M Gibbons (1 '45), Stephen Staunton, J Heneghan 0-1 each	Castlebar; Referee: Peter Geraghty (Swinford); Man of the Match: Eamonn Tiernan

Round 2

6/17/17; 17:30	Kiltimagh	3-18 - 1-7	Castlebar Mitchels B	Kiltimagh; Referee: Benny Holmes (Ballina); Man of the Match: Brian Gallagher

6/17/17; 19:00	Moy Davitts	2-17 - 1-6	Tourmakeady	Tourmakeady; Referee: John Walker (Kilcommon); Man of the Match: Brian Reape

Round 3

10/1/17; 12:30	Moy Davitts	9-14 - 1-8	Castlebar Mitchels B	Connacht GAA Centre

10/1/17; 12:30	Kiltimagh	0-20 - 2-5	Tourmakeady	Claremorris

=== Quarter-finals ===
08-10-2017; 2pm Quarter Final	Moy Davitts	1-17	Parke 1-15	Bekan; Referee: John Walker

6-10-2017; 2pm Quarter-final	Ardnaree	1-9	Kiltimagh 0-14	Bekan; Referee: Mel Kenny

6-10-2017; 2pm Quarter Final	Islandeady	2-18	Burrishoole 2-12	Westport; Referee: Liam Devenney

6-10-2017; 2pm Quarter Final	Louisburgh	1-13	Mayo Gaels 0-9	Westport; Referee: Vincent Neary

=== Semi finals ===
14-10-2017; 4pm Semi-Final	Bohola Moy Davitts	2-11	Islandeady 0-13	Ballina; Referee: Kevin Connelly

14-10-2017; 4pm Semi-Final	Kiltimagh	3-10	Louisburgh 1-11	Ballina; Referee: Charlie Collins

=== Final ===
28-10-2017; 7pm Final Replay	Bohola Moy Davitts	2-10	Kiltimagh 2-9	Castlebar; Referee: Kevin Connelly
