= Mayo Minor Football Championship =

The Mayo Minor Football Championship is an annual Gaelic football competition for clubs affiliated with Mayo GAA. It is restricted to players under the age of 18. It consists of 4 regional competitions based on geographical area followed by county semi finals and final. The current champions are Castlebar Mitchels.

== Roll of honour ==
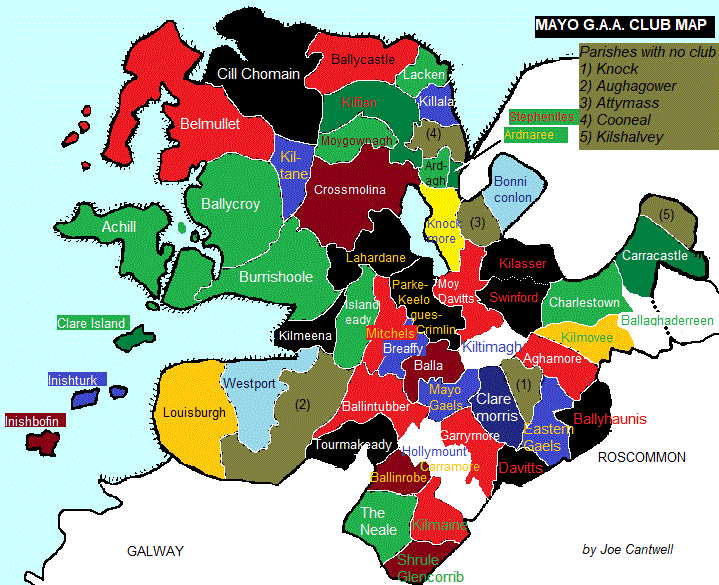
Mayo clubs

Year	Winner	Score	Opponent	Score
2023	Claremorris	3-14	Castlebar Mitchels	0-06
2022	Moy Davitts 1-13	Kilmeena	0-06	
2021	Claremorris	0-11	Castlebar Mitchels	0-09
2020	Castlebar Mitchels	5-13	Ballina Stephenites	3-05
2019	Knockmore	3-07	Castlebar Mitchels	1-09
2018	Westport	2-16	Parke-Keelogues-Crimlin	3-09
2017	Balla	1-14	Westport	1-11
2015	Claremorris	2-12	Breaffy	0-04
2014	Bohola Moy Davitts	2-13	Claremorris	1-09
2013	Breaffy	0-12	Claremorris	0-03
2012	Castlebar Mitchels	2-11	Aghamore	0-12
2011	Ballina Stephenites	3-09	Castlebar Mitchels	1-08
2010	Ballina Stephenites	1-09	Charlestown	1-04
2009	Castlebar Mitchels	1-13	Kiltimagh	0-09
2008	Knockmore	2-09	Aghamore	2-08
2007	Castlebar Mitchels	2-11	Aghamore	2-05
2006	Breaffy	2-11	Knockmore	0-7
2005	Knockmore	2-06	Swinford	1-06
2004	Ballintubber	6-11	Bohola Moy Davitts	4-09
2003	Belmullet GAA	0-08	Castlebar Mitchels GAA	0-06
2002	Castlebar Mitchels	2-13	Aghamore	2-09
1993	Crossmolina Deel Rovers	1-11	Castlebar Mitchels	1-05
1992	Crossmolina Deel Rovers	1-11	Achill	1-05
