= Connacht Junior Club Football Championship =

- Current season or competition: 2026 Connacht Junior Club Football Championship
- Irish: Craobh Shóisir Peile Chonnachta na gClub
- Code: Gaelic football
- Founded: 1998
- Region: Connacht (GAA)
- No. of teams: 5
- Title holders: Kiltimagh (1st title)
- Most titles: [[Kiltimagh, Lahardane Machales and Killala 2 titles each (2 each titles)
- Sponsors: Allied Irish Banks

The Connacht Junior Club Football Championship, known for sponsorship reasons as the AIB Connacht Junior Club Football Championship and shortened to the Connacht Club JFC, is a Gaelic football competition between the winners of the junior county championships in the province of Connacht, Ireland.

The winners of this competition qualify for the All-Ireland Junior Club Football Championship.

Kiltimagh of Mayo are the current champions, having defeated Aughavas of Leitrim in the 2025 decider.

== Qualification ==
County	Championship	Qualifying team
Galway	Galway Primary Junior Football Championship	Champions
Leitrim	Leitrim Junior A Football Championship	Champions
Mayo	Mayo Premier Junior A Football Championship	Champions
Roscommon	Roscommon Junior A Football Championship	Champions
Sligo	Sligo Junior Football Championship	Champions

== List of finals ==
Year	Winners			Runners-up		
Year	County	Club	Score	County	Club	Score
2025	Mayo	Kiltimagh	0-16	Leitrim	Aughavas	0-08
2024	Galway	An Cheathrú Rua	4-12	Sligo	Ballymote	2-10
2023	Mayo	Lahardane	3-10	Sligo	Owenmore Gaels	1-12
2022	Galway	Clifden	1-16	Roscommon	St. Ronan's	0-10
2021	Mayo	Kilmeena	1-18	Sligo	St Patrick's	0-05
2020	Cancelled due to COVID-19 pandemic					
2019	Mayo	Kilmaine	5-17	Sligo	St Michael's	0-03
2018	Sligo	Easkey	1-11	Galway	Naomh Pádraig, An Fháirche	1-10
2017	Mayo	Lahardane	1-15	Sligo	Ballymote	3-05
2016	Mayo	Louisburgh	2-09	Roscommon	Creggs	0-11
2015	Mayo	Ardnaree Sarsfields	1-11	Galway	Clifden	1-07
2014	Galway	Oileáin Árann	0-16	Mayo	Achill	0-08
2013	Roscommon	Fuerty	0-18	Galway	Headford	0-12
2012	Galway	Ballinasloe	4-11	Roscommon	Oran	0-07
2011	Galway	Naomh Pádraig, An Fháirche	0-11	Mayo	Islandeady	0-09
2010	Mayo	Parke	2-16	Leitrim	Eslin	2-09
2009	Mayo	Kiltimagh	0–11	Galway	An Spidéal	0–10
2008	Mayo	Killala	1-10	Roscommon	Kilglass Gaels	0-03
2007	Galway	St Colman's	2-06	Mayo	Achill	0-08
2006	Mayo	Killala	1-13	Galway	Clifden	2-07
2005	Galway	Loughrea	2-08	Mayo	Cill Chomáin	2-07
2004	Roscommon	Tulsk	1-10	Mayo	Aghamore	0-05
2003	Mayo	Breaffy	1-20	Galway	Salthill-Knocknacarra	2–03
2002	Mayo	Kilmeena	1-11	Roscommon	St Dominic's	1-08
2001	Mayo	Belmullet	0-18	Galway	Salthill-Knocknacarra	2-06
2000	Galway	Mícheál Breathnach				
1999	Sligo	St John's		Galway	Monivea Abbey	
1998	Mayo	Tuar Mhic Éadaigh	0-11	Galway	Claregalway	1-01

== See also ==
- All Ireland Junior Club Football Championship
- Munster Junior Club Football Championship
- Leinster Junior Club Football Championship
- Ulster Junior Club Football Championship
