= Oisín Mullin =

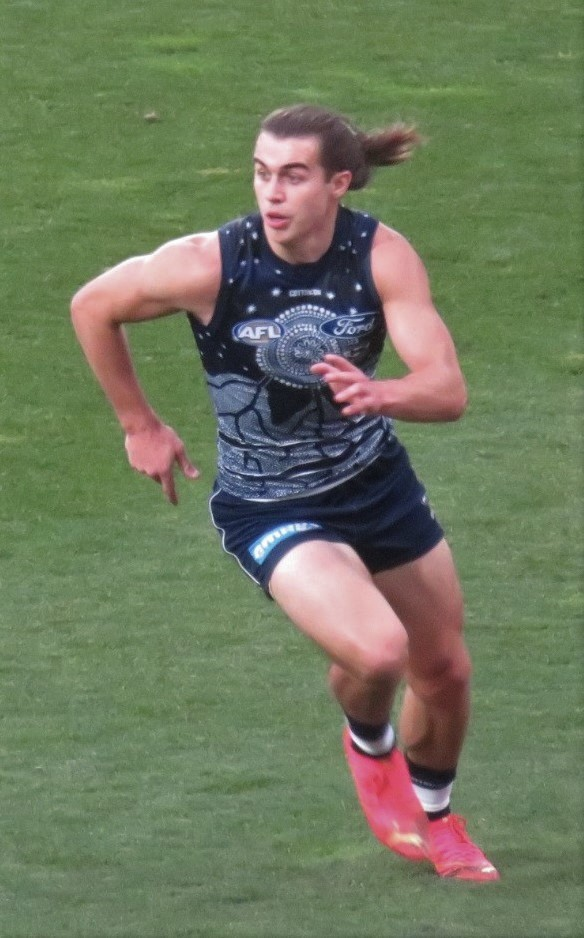
- Mullin playing for Geelong Football Club

Personal information
- Native name: Oisín Ó Maoláin (Irish)
- Born: 11 February 2000 (age 26)
- Height: 5 ft 11 in (180 cm)

Sport
- Sport: Gaelic football
- Position: Defender
Club
- Years: Club
- kilmaine
Inter-county
- Years: County
- 2020–2022: Mayo
Inter-county titles
- Connacht titles: 2
- All Stars: 1

Oisín Mullin (born 11 February 2000) is an Irish professional Australian rules footballer who plays for the Geelong Football Club in the Australian Football League (AFL). Before making the code switch to AFL, Mullin played Gaelic football for Kilmaine and the Mayo county team.

== Gaelic football career ==
=== Club ===
On 12 October 2019, Mullin was in the half back line as Kilmaine went up against Castlebar Mitchels B in the final of the Mayo Junior Football Championship. Mullin scored 0-3 but Castlebar were winners by 0–14 to 0–11. As second teams are not allowed to compete in the provincial championships, Kilmaine represented Mayo in the Connacht Junior Club Football Championship. On 16 November, Mullin was in midfield as Kilmaine beat St Michael's of Sligo in the Connacht Club JFC final. Mullin scored two points, and was named man of the match after the 5–18 to 0–3 win.

On 19 September 2020, Mullin was in midfield as Kilmaine faced Kilmeena in the final of the Mayo Junior Football Championship. Mullin scored a point as Kilmaine came out on top by a single point.

=== Inter-county ===
==== Minor and under-20 ====
On 17 June 2018, Mullin was at centre back as the Mayo under-20 team faced Roscommon in the Connacht final. Mullin went off with an injury in the second half, but Mayo ran out winners by sixteen points. Mullin didn't feature for the rest of the championship and Mayo went on to lose the All-Ireland final to Kildare.

On 10 July 2019, Mullin was at corner back for his second successive Connacht U20FC final, this time against Galway. Galway won by six points on the day. Mullin was named in the top 20 players of the under-20 championship at the end of the season.

==== Senior ====
Mullin joined the senior squad in 2020, and made his championship debut in a first round Connacht Senior Football Championship (SFC) win over Leitrim the same year. On 15 November, Mullin was at corner-back as Mayo faced Galway in the Connacht SFC final. Mullin claimed his first Connacht SFC title as Mayo had a one-point win. Mayo went on to reach the All-Ireland SFC final, where they faced Dublin on December 20. Dublin claimed a sixth consecutive title after a 2–14 to 0–15 win. After the final, Mullin was named on The Sunday Game Team of the Year. Mullin was later selected at corner back on the All Star team, and also claimed the Young Footballer of the Year award.

On 25 July 2021, Mullin started his second consecutive Connacht SFC final, with Mayo facing Galway once again. A strong second half landed Mayo's second provincial title in a row. On 13 September, Mullin started his second All-Ireland SFC final, with Mayo coming up against Tyrone, and Mayo coming up short once again. Mullin was later named Young Footballer of the Year for a second time.

== AFL career ==
Oisín Mullin

Personal information
- Full name: Oisín Ó Maoláin
- Born: 11 February 2000 (age 26)
- Debut: Round 11, 2023, Geelong vs. Greater Western Sydney, at GMHBA Stadium
- Height: 182 cm (6 ft 0 in)
- Weight: 85 kg (187 lb)
- Position: Defender

Club information
- Current club: Geelong
- Number: 34

Playing career^{1}
Years	Club	Games (Goals)
2023–	Geelong	68 (5)
- ^{1} Playing statistics correct to the end of 2026.

On 4 November 2021, it was reported that Mullin would be joining the Geelong Cats club in the Australian Football League, with the club confirming the signing six days later. However, in January 2022, it was confirmed that Mullin would not join Geelong and would continue to play with Mayo.

In November 2022, after staying with Mayo for the year, it was announced that Mullin would join Geelong for the 2023 season.

After having only played three games of the sport, Mullin made his AFL debut in round 11 of the 2023 AFL season in a 7-point loss against the Greater Western Sydney Giants at Kardinia Park. Mullin collected 15 disposals, four contested possession and six intercept possessions on his debut.

Mullin would play six matches during the 2023 season, followed by 12 matches during the 2024 AFL season, including the two finals matches played by Geelong. In 2025 he was a regular in the Geelong team, spending time across half back and in the midfield. He would sign a new contract in July 2025 that would keep him with the club until the end of the 2027 AFL season.

== Honours ==
Mayo

- Connacht Senior Football Championship (2): 2020, 2021
- Connacht Under-20 Football Championship (1): 2018

Kilmaine

- Connacht Junior Club Football Championship (1): 2019
- Mayo Junior Football Championship (1): 2020

Individual

- All Star Award (1): 2020
- GAA/GPA Young Footballer of the Year (2): 2020, 2021
- The Sunday Game Team of the Year (1): 2020
- Eirgrid 20 Under-20 Award (1): 2019
