= Dublin Junior 2 Football Championship =

Gaelic football competition in Dublin, Ireland

- Irish: Craobh Shóisear Peile; Bhaile Átha Cliath
- Founded: 2018
- Title holders: Beann Eadair (2nd title)
- Sponsors: Go Ahead Transport

The Dublin Junior 2 Football championship is the secondary Junior Gaelic Athletic Association Gaelic football competition of Dublin. The winners of the Junior 2 Championship go on to qualify for the Dublin Junior Football Championship.

== Format ==
In 2018, the grading system of Junior Championships was restructured. The Dublin Junior Football Championship is divided between Junior 1 and 2. This provided every club first team to play in a championship with the aim of progressing to intermediate and senior, without facing other clubs second, third, or fourth side teams.

Junior 1 consists of 16 teams who are divided into four groups of four. The top two sides in each group are then included in an open draw for the quarter-finals of the championship. The team that wins the Dublin Junior Football Championship, and the runner up is promoted to the Dublin Intermediate Championship. The teams that finish at the bottom of their respective groups go on to play in a relegation championship. The eventual loser drops to the Dublin Junior 2 Football Championship.

Junior 2 consists of 12 teams. The top two sides in each group are then included in an open draw for the quarter-finals of the championship. No team can be relegated from the Dublin Junior 2 Football Championship.

A club that has an additional team in Championship will compete in the All County Championship. The All County Championship is divided into 6 divisions and participation will vary each year depending on each club's performance in higher graded divisions.

== Roll of honour ==
Year	Winner	Score	Opponent	Score
2025	Garda Westmanstown Gaels	0-17	Erin go Bragh	1-09
2024	Beann Eadair	1-12	Robert Emmets	0-04
2023	St Kevin's Killians	3-11	Bank of Ireland	3-09
2022	Beann Eadair	3-08	Ballyboden Wanderers	2-07
2021	Ballyfermot De La Salle	3-15	Shankill	2-08
2020	Ballyboden Wanderers	1-10	Ballyfermot De La Salle	0-08
2019	Stars of Erin	1-12	Beann Eadair	1-09
2018	Ranelagh Gaels	1-13	Ballyfermot De La Salle	2-08
