= St Joseph's/OCB GAA =

Gaelic games club in County Dublin, Ireland

- Founded: 1918
- County: Dublin
- Nickname: Joeys
- Colours: Purple, maroon, gold
- Grounds: Fairview Park

Playing kits
Standard colours

St Joseph's/OCB (Irish: Naomh Seosamh, BUC) are an amateur athletic club located in the North Inner city of Dublin, Ireland. They are the last remaining Gaelic Athletic Association club in the area.

The club is an amalgamation of two clubs: St Joseph's of East Wall and O’Connell Boys of North Wall. St Joseph's were founded in 1918 and rose to prominence, especially in the 1920s and 1930s, albeit with intermittent objections; St Joseph's also produced a continuing stream of inter-county players. O’Connell Boys were established in 1964, as a club for the former members of the O’Connell Boys Youth Club in Seville Place, Dublin. However, changes to the inner city in the latter half of the 20th century – population decline, unemployment, and school closings – caused a corresponding decline in membership for both clubs. At the end of 1989, the two clubs merged into St Joseph's/OCB and have played as such since the 1990 season.

The club currently field teams in Gaelic football and hurling. GAA competition includes Senior and Junior age groups.

The "Joeys" play in the colours of purple, maroon and gold.

== St Joseph's (1918–1989) ==
St Joseph's were founded in 1918 in the inner city East Wall section of Dublin, Ireland. They joined a number of other existing Gaelic Athletic Association (GAA) clubs in the area, such as the Mandeville Volunteers and O’Tooles.

The club progressed quickly through the ranks. In 1922 they won a Junior League. Club finances rose with their team success: they received £13.7.2 in gate receipts from a game they played that season, and a replay against O’Tooles pulled in £351.17.4, a record gate at the time. In 1927 they won the Junior Football Championship and again in 1929. In 1928 they won the Dublin Intermediate Football Championship.

The 1930s started as another great decade for St Joseph's. The first game in the 1930 final drew a crowd of 7,000 and was described by a reporter as ‘the best football of the century.’ Over 12,000 attended the replay, which St Joseph's won 2–3 to 1–5; one St Joseph's player, Paddy Mulhall, scored 2–2. In 1930 the club won their only Senior Football championship to date after a replay, beating the (then) local rival team O’Tooles; in 1934, St Joseph's were runners up to Garda in the same competition. In 1932, St Joseph's reached the St. Vincent de Paul Cup final but lost to Geraldines; that same year they reached the Senior League final, only to lose to Garda.

However, the 30s also saw controversy and lost opportunity. A game against Laois had to be abandoned because of a fracas after two Dublin players were sent off. The club were suspended for 12 months, as it was held responsible by both the County Board and Central Council. The following year the club were again in front of the County Board, this time due to an objection by Parnells who alleged player fraud. In the allegation – and confirmed by three witnesses – James Kelly of St Joseph's had been a member of the St. Marys F.C. club but played without a transfer for Marino Gaels on 11 and 18 May 1930. The County Board upheld the objection and St Joseph's were struck out of the championship. After the club was reinstated in 1932, there was another fracas at the end of the Senior League final game. A St Joseph's player called C. Duffy went so far as to enter the Garda dressing room and was suspended for 4 weeks. The St Joseph's officers maintained that the players had thought their ball – a scarce commodity at the time – had been confiscated by their rivals. In 1936 the club was again at the end of an objection about player fraud, this time from O’Tooles, who alleged that two St Joseph's players on the Dublin Junior Championship team had also played soccer; at the time, this was in breach of the GAA's rule banning players from playing foreign games.

In 1951 they reached the Senior Football Championship semi-final, losing to St. Vincents. In 1952 it was St. Vincent again who ended their championship hopes, this time at the quarter-final stage. The game in 1952 was due to be refereed by Cavan GAA player Simon Deignam, but he failed to show. Sean O’Siochain offered to officiate but there was an objection from one of the teams. Finally, both sides agreed to John Joe Maher of the Civil Service club as the referee. The game itself was described by reporters as a ‘mixture of spasmodic football, frequent wrestling, occasional fisticuffs with many deliberate fouls and some interference from the sideline spectators.’ However, after the win by St. Vincents, both teams showed great spirit: shaking hands at the end and ‘departing the field shoulder to shoulder as if they had enjoyed the whole affair.’

The club produced a number of inter-county players for Dublin throughout the years. As winners of the Dublin Championship in 1930 they had the selection of the county team. Paddy Mulhall was one of the standouts in the 1930s, described by Sean Synott of the rival O’Tooles club as a "great Footballer and even better soccer goalkeeper who was wanted but refused to join Glasgow Celtic. Paddy worked in the Glasgow boat section in Dublin Docks".

St Joseph's success in the earlier years had reflected the Dublin population: most were employed in traditional industries and their associated downstream activities, which helped maintain the club. However, movement of the inner city population to the suburbs resulted in rising unemployment and increasing school closures, resulting in the club's decline as the years progressed.

=== Roll of Honour ===
- 1922 Junior Football League Winners
- 1927 Dublin Junior Football Championship Winners
- 1928 Dublin Intermediate Football Championship Winners
- 1929 Dublin Junior Football Championship Winners
- 1930 Dublin Senior Football Championship Winners
- 1932 St. Vincent de Paul Cup Runners-up
- 1932 Dublin AFL Division 1 Runners-up
- 1934 Dublin Senior Football Championship Runners-up
- 1959 Dublin Junior Football Championship Winners

== O’Connell Boys (1964–1989) ==
O’Connell Boys Club were established in 1964, in the North Wall area of Northside, Dublin, Ireland. It was set up to cater to former members of the O’Connell Boys Youth Club.

The club is probably best associated with inter-county player and Dublin All Star Paddy Cullen, who was described in the annual ‘Dublin 76’ as the backbone of the club. Former Dublin secretary Jim King was also from O’Connell Boys.

O’Connell Boys was listed as one of 15 clubs to have its own premises in 1975.

The club hosted the annual Inner City Tournament, which is still played annually. Clubs who take part are based close to or between the two canals that form the borders of Dublin City. O’Connell Boys won the Tournament in 1985, 1987, and 1989.

Like many inner city clubs, O’Connell Boys suffered from the movement of the city population to the suburbs. At a committee meeting in 1983, it was noted that 12 players had left the club, 11 of whom had departed because they no longer resided in the inner city. The club – which had fielded two teams throughout the years – was eventually reduced to fielding a single team. In 1989 it looked as though they faced extinction, with only 12 people attending the club's annual general meeting.

Role of Honour

- 1985, 1987, 1989 winners of the Inner City Tournament

== Amalgamation (1989) ==
The Dublin Corporation, now the Dublin City Council, inspired movement of the inner city population to the suburbs. This resulted in a reduction in the number of inner city clubs as the years went by. Many clubs just simply ceased to exist. Others relocated; for example, local rivals O’Tooles moved out to Coolock and Scoil Ui Connaill moved to Clontarf. Some clubs amalgamated with others; for example, Eoghan Ruadh's merge with St. Oliver Plunketts produced St. Oliver Plunketts/Eoghan Ruadh GAA.

St Joseph's and O’Connell Boys joined forces at the end of 1989 for the beginning of the 1990 season. By 2000, of the 31 clubs that had existed within the inner city of Dublin, only one would remain – St Joseph's/O’Connell Boys.

== Recent history ==
St Joseph's/OCB plays in Fairview Park, Dublin. Team colours are purple, maroon and gold.

The club fields two football teams.

The club won the Dublin Junior B Football Championship in 2004 beating St. Vincents in the final in Parnell Park.

The club has a single hurling team. They were runners up in the Dublin Junior E Hurling Championship in 2008.

The St. Joseph's/O'Connell Boys hurlers won the 2016 Dublin Junior F Hurling Championship, beating Réalt Dearg by 6–12 to 3–14 at O'Toole Park. They won the 2017 Junior E Hurling Championship beating Na Gaeil Óga 1–11 to 0–10. They won the 2018 Junior D Hurling Championship again beating Na Gaeil Óga, this time on a scoreline 1–14 to 3–7.

St Joseph's/OCB also fields underage boys and girls teams. The club has fielded football teams at the Under 12-minor level, Under 12, and Under 14. Past hurling teams include Under 12 and Under 14 in 2008 and 2009. They also fielded teams at Under 12 and 13 girls football. In recent times, however, the underage section of the club is far smaller, with just a single Under 12 boys team in 2011; however, those Under 12 boys team were Division 2 runners up in the annual Ger Canavan Tournament in 2011.

The "Joeys" continue to host the annual Inner City Tournament for Gaelic Football. Clubs who take part are based close to or between the two canals that form the borders of Dublin City. The tournament was originally organised by O’Connell Boys and has been won by the club eight times.

The club currently has several members who are referees, officiating games throughout Dublin. In 2003, Barry Flynn was elected as County Board Minor fixtures secretary.

The club continues to draw support from the surrounding community. In 2009, the club received funding towards upgrading clubhouse facilities from the Croke Park community fund. in 2011, St Joseph's/OCB were awarded €5,000 from Ulster Bank GAA Force, an initiative to help local GAA clubs with their facilities; the support package will be used in helping the club complete renovation of its clubhouse, a project that started in 2008 although financial constraints have impeded its completion.

Role of Honour

- 1991, 1993, 1999, 2001, 2002, 2003, 2004, 2008 (2nd team) winners of the Inner City Tournament
- 2004 Dublin Junior B Football Championship Winners
- 2008 Dublin Junior E Hurling Championship Runners-up
- 2009 Dublin AFL Div. 8: Winners
- 2011 Dublin Under 12 Ger Canavan Tournament Runners-up (Div 2)
- 2011 Dublin Under 12 Football League North Division 4 Runners-up
- 2012 Dublin Under 14 Division 8 Football League Winners
- 2016 Dublin Junior F Hurling Championship Winners
- 2017 Dublin Junior E Hurling Championship Winners
- 2018 Dublin Junior D Hurling Championship Winners

== See also ==
- List of Gaelic games clubs in Ireland

== Bibliography ==
- The Gaelic Athletic Association in Dublin 1884–2000 (2005). Editor and compiler: William Nolan. Contributors: Jim Wren, Marcus de Búrca, David Gorry. ISBN 0-906602-82-3.
