= Brian Maloney =

Irish Gaelic footballer

Personal information
- Born: County Mayo

Sport
- Sport: Gaelic football
- Position: Wing Forward
Clubs
- Years: Club
- Kilmaine; St Vincents
Club titles
- Dublin titles: 1
- Connacht titles: 1 (Leinster)
- All-Ireland Titles: 1
Inter-county
- Years: County
- 2004: Mayo
Inter-county titles
- Connacht titles: 2

Brian Maloney is a Gaelic footballer who plays for St Vincents and the Mayo county team.

Maloney formerly played with Kilmaine GAA in his native County Mayo although he has since moved to Dublin's St Vincents club. He won a Mayo Minor Football Championship medal with Kilmaine and the Junior League in 1997. He was awarded young Mayo Player of the Year in 1995. He won his first Dublin Senior Football Championship medal with St Vincents in 2007 against St Brigid's at Parnell Park. He then went on to win the Leinster Senior Club Football Championship final against Tyrrellspass of Westmeath, and in 2008 won the All-Ireland Senior Club Football Championship with St Vincents in a hard-fought game.
