= Joe Corcoran =

Irish Gaelic footballer

Personal information
- Native name: Seosamh Ó Corcáin (Irish)
- Nickname: Jinking Joe
- Born: 1940 Ballina, County Mayo, Ireland
- Died: 23 October 2017 (aged 77) Ballina, County Mayo, Ireland

Sport
- Sport: Gaelic football
- Position: Left wing-forward
Club
- Years: Club
- Ardnaree Sarsfields
Club titles
- Mayo titles: 0
Inter-county
Years	County	Apps (scores)
1958–1974	Mayo	27 (2–101)
Inter-county titles
- Connacht titles: 2
- All-Irelands: 0
- NFL: 1
- All Stars: 0

Joseph Corcoran (1940 – 23 October 2017) was an Irish Gaelic footballer. His league and championship career at senior level with the Mayo county team spanned three decades from 1958 until 1974.

Born in Ballina, County Mayo, Corcoran played at golf in his youth. At the age of fourteen he first played competitive Gaelic football with the Ardnaree Sarsfields club. He later progressed onto the adult team and won two county junior championship medals.

Corcoran made his debut on the inter-county scene when he was selected for the Mayo minor team. He was an All-Ireland runner-up in this grade in 1958, having earlier won a Connacht medal. Corcoran made his senior debut during the 1958-59 league and, after a brief spell with the Mayo junior team, he became a regular member of the team. Over the course of a sixteen-year career, he won Connacht medals in 1967 and 1969, followed by a National League medal in 1970. Corcoran played his last game for Mayo in March 1974.

As a member of the Connacht inter-provincial team on a number of occasions, Corcoran won a Railway Cup medal in 1969.

Kevin McStay mentioned Corcoran as only being matched by Cillian O'Connor in the pantheon of Mayo forwards. "Ciaran McDonald was a completely different type of forward. He wasn't amassing the numbers Cillian gets. So that's two top class forwards, heavy scoring machines in 50–60 years", McStay told Dermot Crowe in 2022.

== Honours ==
Ardnaree Sarsfields

- Mayo Junior Football Championship (2): 1959, 1971

Mayo

- Connacht Senior Football Championship (2): 1967, 1969
- National Football League (1): 1969-70

Connacht

- Railway Cup (1): 1969
