= Mayo Junior Football Championship =

Annual Gaelic football competition

- Irish: Craobh Soisear Peile; Co. Muigheo
- Trophy: McDonnell Cup
- Title holders: Lahardane MacHales GAA
- Sponsors: TF Royal Hotel

The Mayo Junior Football Championship is an annual Gaelic football competition contested by lower-tier Mayo GAA clubs.

Ardagh are the current title holders (2026)

== Honours ==
The trophy presented to the winners is the McDonnell Cup.

The winners of the Mayo Junior Championship qualify to represent their county in the Connacht Junior Club Football Championship. They often do well there, with the likes of Kilmeena (January 2022, following 2021 Mayo JFC win), Kilmaine (2019), Louisburgh (2016) and Ardnaree Sarsfields (2015) among the clubs from Mayo to win at least one Connacht Championship after winning the Mayo Junior Football Championship.

Former Mayo manager John Maughan was in charge of Lahardane when they won the 2017 Mayo JFC for the first time and then followed it up with a Connacht title, also in 2017.

The winners can, in turn, go on to play in the All-Ireland Junior Club Football Championship. In 2022, Kilmeena became the first club from Mayo to win one All-Ireland Junior Football Championship after winning the Connacht and Mayo Junior Football Championships. Previous finalists included Kiltimagh in 2010 and Ardnaree Sarsfields in 2016.

== List of finals ==
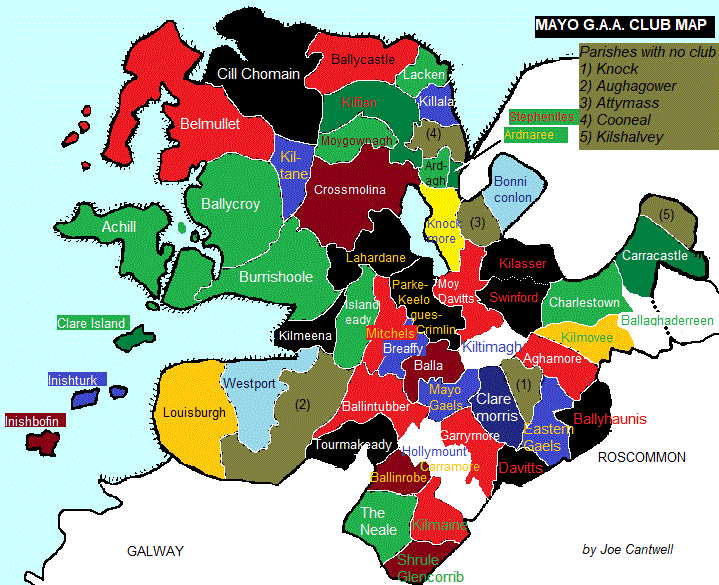
Mayo GAA clubs

Location of County Mayo in Ireland

Year	Winner	Opponent
2026	Ardagh 3-14	Eastern Gaels 1-11
2025	Kiltimagh 1-17	Eastern Gaels 0-7
2024	Cill Chomáin 2-10	Bonniconlon 0-10
2023	Lahardane McHales 2-10	Shrule-Glencorrib 0-11
2022	Islandeady 2-11	Cill Chomáin 1-07
2021	Kilmeena 1-10	Cill Chomáin1-7
2020	Kilmaine 1-13	Kilmeena 1-12
2019	Castlebar Mitchels B 0-14	Kilmaine 0-11
2018	Balla 1-12	Achill 1-07
2017	Lahardane2-11	Kilmaine 0-15
2016	Louisburgh 0-10	Balla 0-9
2015	Ardnaree 6-14	Killala 0-7
2014	Castlebar Mitchels B 1-10	Achill 3-03
2013	Cill Chomáin 2-12	Ardnaree 1-07
2012	The Neale 1-17	Ardnaree 2-09
2011	Islandeady 1-10	Ardnaree 0-09
2010	Parke-Keelogues-Crimlin 2-9	Islandeady 2-8
2009	Kiltimagh 0-11	Ardnaree 1-6
2008	Kilalla 1-08	The Neale
2007	Achill	
2006	Crossmolina Deel Rovers	
2005	Cill Chomáin	Castlebar Mitchels B
2004	Aghamore	
2003		
2002	Kilmeena	
2001	Belmullet	
2000		
1999		
1998	Tuar Mhic Éadaigh	
1997	Parke-Keelogues-Crimlin	
1996		
1995	Achill	
1994	Louisburgh	Carramore
1993	Kilmeena	
1992		
1991	Achill	
1990	Islandeady	
1989		
1988	Islandeady	
1986	Kilmeena	
1985	Islandeady 2-8	Lahardane MacHales 1-5
1984		
1983	Achill	
1982		
1981	Parke-Keelogues-Crimlin	
1980	Balla	
1979	Tuar Mhic Éadaigh	
1978	Bonniconlon	
1977	Kilmeena	
1976	Parke-Keelogues-Crimlin 1-6	Lahardane MacHales 1-4
1975	Crossmolina Deel Rovers	
1974	Islandeady	
1973		
1972	Kiltane	
1971	Ardnaree	
1970	Westport	
1969	Aghamore	
1968		
1967		
1966		
1965	Achill	
1959	Ardnaree/Islandeady?	
1958		
1957		
1956		
1955	Crossmolina Deel Rovers	
1954		
1953		
1952	Ardnaree	
1951		
1950		
1949		Swinford
1948		
1947	Crossmolina Deel Rovers	
1946		
1945		
1944	Mayo Abbey	
1943		
1942	Achill	
1941	Westport	
1940		
1939		
1938		
1937	Westport	
1931	Crossmolina Deel Rovers	
1926	Crossmolina Deel Rovers	

== Wins listed by club ==
- Crossmolina Deel Rovers (8): 1926, 1931, 1947, 1955, 1962, 1975, 2006
- Achill (7): 1942, 1965, 1983, 1991, 1995, 2007, 2014
- Islandeady (6): 1959, 1974, 1988, 1990, 2011, 2022
- Kilmeena (5): 1977, 1986, 1993, 2002, 2021
- Ardnaree (4): 1952, 1959, 1971, 2015
- Parke (4) :1976,1981,1997,2010
- Westport (3): 1937, 1941, 1970
- Cill Chomáin (3): 2005, 2012, 2024
- Lahardane (2): 2017, 2023
- Aghamore (2): 1969, 2004
- Tuar Mhic Éadaigh (2): 1979, 1998
- Balla (2): 1980, 2018
- Kiltimagh (2): 2009, 2025
- Kiltane (1): 1972
- Bonniconlon (1): 1978
- Belmullet (1): 2001
- Louisburgh (1): 2016
- Kilmaine (1): 2020
- Ardagh (1): 2026
