= Tommy Treacy =

Irish hurler (1904–1985)

Personal information
- Native name: Tomás Ó Treasaigh (Irish)
- Born: 2 March 1904 Killea, County Tipperary, Ireland
- Died: 25 September 1985 (aged 81) Blanchardstown, Dublin, Ireland

Sport
- Sport: Hurling
- Position: Midfield
Clubs
- Years: Club
- Killea; Young Irelands
Club titles
- Dublin titles: 4
Inter-county
- Years: County
- 1927–1932 1933–1935 1936–1943: Tipperary; Dublin; Tipperary
Inter-county titles
- Munster titles: 3
- Leinster titles: 1
- All-Irelands: 2
- NHL: 1

Thomas Treacy (2 March 1904 – 25 September 1985) was an Irish hurler. At club he played with Killea and Young Irelands, and also lined out at inter-county level with various Tipperary and Dublin teams.

== Career ==
Treacy first played hurling at club level with Killea, with whom he won a Mid Tipperary SHC medal in 1928. He later transferred to the Young Irelands club in Dublin. Treacy's adopted team enjoyed a golden age during his playing days and he won Dublin SHC titles in 1932, 1937, 1942 and 1943.

At inter-county level, Treacy first played for Tipperary as a member of the junior team in 1926. He won an All-Ireland JHC medal as team captain that year after a 6-02 to 2-03 defeat of Galway in the final. Treacy was immediately promoted to the senior team in 1927 and soon won a National Hurling League title. He won a Munster SHC after a defeat of Clare in 1930. Treacy lined out at midfield when Tipperary beat Dublin in the 1930 All-Ireland final.

Treacy declared for the Dublin senior hurling team in 1933. He won a Leinster SHC medal the following year, however, Dublin were later beaten by Limerick in the 1934 All-Ireland final. After three years with the Dublin team, Treacy once again declared for Tipperary. He claimed a second All-Ireland SHC medal after Tipperary's defeat of Kilkenny in the 1937 All-Ireland final.

Treacy brought his 16-year inter-county career to an end in 1943, by which stage he had won a third Munster SHC medal. He also earned selection to the Munster team and won Railway Cup medals in 1930, 1931 and 1934.

== Death ==
Treacy died at James Connolly Memorial Hospital, Dublin on 25 September 1985, at the age of 81.

== Honours ==
Killea

- Mid Tipperary Senior Hurling Championship: 1928

Young Irelands

- Dublin Senior Hurling Championship: 1932, 1937, 1942, 1943

Tipperary

- All-Ireland Senior Hurling Championship: 1930, 1937
- Munster Senior Hurling Championship: 1930, 1937, 1941
- National Hurling League: 1927–28
- All-Ireland Junior Hurling Championship: 1926 (c)
- Munster Junior Hurling Championship: 1926 (c)

Dublin

- Leinster Senior Hurling Championship: 1934

Munster

- Railway Cup: 1930, 1931, 1934
