= 1926 All-Ireland Junior Hurling Championship =

All Ireland Champions
- Winners: Tipperary (4th win)
- Captain: Tommy Treacy

All Ireland Runners-up
- Runners-up: Galway

Provincial Champions
- Munster: Tipperary
- Leinster: Wexford
- Ulster: Not Played
- Connacht: Galway

The 1926 All-Ireland Junior Hurling Championship was the ninth staging of the All-Ireland Junior Championship since its establishment by the Gaelic Athletic Association in 1912.

Cork entered the championship as the defending champions, however, they were beaten by Tipperary in the Munster final.

The All-Ireland final was played on 13 March 1927 at Thurles Sportsfield, between Tipperary and Galway, in their first meeting in a final since 1924. Tipperary won the match by 6-02 to 2-03 to claim their fourth championship title overall and first title since 1924.

== Results ==
=== All-Ireland Junior Hurling Championship ===
==== All-Ireland semi-final ====
12 December 1926 Semi-final	Wexford	1-01 - 5-03	Tipperary	New Ross Sportsfield

==== All-Ireland final ====
13 March 1927 Final	Tipperary	6-02 - 2-03	Galway	Thurles Sportsfield
