= Robert McCallion Memorial Park =

Football venue in Swinford, Ireland

- Interactive map of Robert McCallion Memorial Park
- Location: Swinford, County Mayo, Ireland
- Coordinates: 53.9348°N 8.9515°W
- Surface: All-weather
- Scoreboard: Digital

Tenant
- Swinford GAA

Robert McCallion Memorial Park is a Gaelic football venue in Swinford, County Mayo. The home of Swinford GAA, it is named in honour of club member Robbie McCallion. It was rededicated in honour of McCallion in 2012, following on from his death three years earlier. Dignitaries present on the day included Taoiseach Enda Kenny and the soon-to-be All-Ireland winning football manager Jim McGuinness of Donegal.
