= Mid Tipperary GAA =

Mid Tipperary GAA (CLG Tiobraid Árann Méanach) is a Gaelic Athletic Association division in County Tipperary, Ireland founded in 1907. The division is one of four affiliated to the Tipperary County Board. It organises competitions for the clubs within the division, from Under 12 up to the adult level in both hurling and Gaelic football. There are currently 15 active GAA clubs in the division. The division has produced good results in both codes, with 4 of the 5 dual senior clubs in Tipperary being from Mid Tipperary. Mid Tipperary clubs have won 78 Tipperary Senior Hurling titles, the most of any division. The most successful club, Thurles Sarsfields, won their 37th title in 2026. 22 Tipperary Senior Football titles have been won by Mid Tipperary teams, Loughmore-Castleiney are the most successful with 17 titles.

== Clubs ==
- Boherlahan-Dualla
- Clonakenny
- Drom & Inch
- Durlas Óg
- Gortnahoe-Glengoole
- Holycross-Ballycahill
- JK Brackens
- Killea
- Knock
- Loughmore-Castleiney
- Moycarkey-Borris
- Moyne-Templetuohy
- Thules Gaels
- Thurles Sarsfields
- Upperchurch-Drombane

== Hurling ==
=== Championship Grades ===
Championship	Clubs
Senior
Senior	Drom & Inch
Senior	Holycross-Ballycahill
Senior	JK Brackens
Senior	Loughmore-Castleiney
Senior	Moycarkey-Borris
Senior	Thurles Sarsfields
Senior	Upperchurch-Drombane
Intermediate
Premier Intermediate	Boherlahan-Dualla
Premier Intermediate	Gortnahoe-Glengoole
Premier Intermediate	Moyne-Templetuohy
Premier Intermediate	Thurles Sarsfields (2)
Intermediate	Clonakenny
Intermediate	Holycross-Ballycahill (2)
Junior
Junior A	Boherlahan-Dualla (2)
Junior A	Drom & Inch (2)
Junior A	JK Brackens (2)
Junior A	Loughmore-Castleiney (2)
Junior A	Moycarkey-Borris (2)
Junior A	Thurles Sarsfields (3)
Junior A	Upperchurch-Drombane (2)
Junior B	Drom & Inch (3)
Junior B	Gortnahoe-Glengoole (2)
Junior B	Holycross-Ballycahill (3)
Junior B	JK Brackens (3)
Junior B	Killea
Junior B	Knock
Junior B	Moycarkey-Borris (3)
Junior B	Moyne-Templetuohy (2)
Junior B	Thules Gaels
Junior B	Thurles Sarsfields (4)
Junior C	Boherlahan-Dualla (3)
Junior C	Clonakenny (2)
Junior C	Gortnahoe-Glengoole (3)
Junior C	Holycross-Ballycahill (4)
Junior C	JK Brackens (4)
Junior C	Killea (2)
Junior C	Loughmore-Castleiney (3)
Junior C	Moyne-Templetuohy (3)
Junior C	Thules Gaels (2)
Junior C	Thurles Sarsfields (5)
Junior C	Upperchurch-Drombane (3)

=== Non-hurling clubs ===
Underage Hurling only (1)

- Durlas Óg (Thurles Sarsfields hurling)

== Football ==
=== Championship Grades ===
Championship	Clubs
Senior
Senior	JK Brackens
Senior	Loughmore-Castleiney
Senior	Thurles Sarsfields
Senior	Upperchurch-Drombane
Intermediate
Intermediate	Moyne-Templetuohy
Junior
Premier Junior	Boherlahan-Dualla
Premier Junior	Loughmore-Castleiney (2)
Premier Junior	Moycarkey-Borris
Junior A	Clonakenny
Junior A	Gortnahoe-Glengoole
Junior A	Holycross-Ballycahill
Junior A	JK Brackens (2)
Junior A	Upperchurch-Drombane (2)
Junior B	Boherlahan-Dualla (2)
Junior B	JK Brackens (3)
Junior B	Moyne-Templetuohy (2)
Junior B	Thules Gaels

=== Non-football clubs ===
Underage Football only (2)

- Durlas Óg (Thurles Sarsfields football)
- Drom & Inch (Last competed 2023)

Clubs who do not play football at any level (2)

- Killea
- Knock

== Divisional Competitions ==
=== Legend ===
- Gold – County champions
- Silver – County runners-up

Competition	Year	Champions	Runners-up
Championship
Mid Tipperary Senior Hurling Championship	2026	Loughmore-Castleiney	Holycross-Ballycahill
Mid Tipperary Senior Football Championship	2023	Loughmore-Castleiney (Note: 2026 Tipperary Senior Football Champions Last Mid Tipperary Senior Football Championship took place in 2023]].)	Upperchurch-Drombane
Mid Tipperary Premier Intermediate Hurling Championship	2026	Thurles Sarsfields	Moyne-Templetuohy
Mid Tipperary Intermediate Hurling Championship	2026	Clonakenny	Holycross-Ballycahill
Mid Tipperary Intermediate Football Championship	2025	Thurles Sarsfields	Moycarkey-Borris
Mid Tipperary Premier Junior Football Championship	2024	Loughmore-Castleiney	JK Brackens
Mid Tipperary Junior A Hurling Championship	2026	Thurles Sarsfields	Moycarkey-Borris
Mid Tipperary Junior A Football Championship	2026	Boherlahan-Dualla	Gortnahoe-Glengoole
Mid Tipperary Junior B Hurling Championship	2026	Killea	Gortnahoe-Glengoole
Mid Tipperary Junior B Football Championship	2026	Upperchurch-Drombane	Thules Gaels
Mid Tipperary Junior C Hurling Championship	2026	Loughmore-Castleiney	Clonakenny
Mid Tipperary U21A Hurling Championship	2026	Holycross-Ballycahill	JK Brackens
Mid Tipperary U21B Hurling Championship	2026	Gortnahoe-Glengoole	Moyne-Templetuohy
Mid Tipperary U21A Football Championship	2026	JK Brackens	Upperchurch-Drombane
Mid Tipperary U21B Football Championship	2025	Moycarkey-Borris	Boherlahan-Dualla

== Former Clubs ==
=== Defunct Clubs ===
- 10th Battalion Templemore (Tipperary Senior Football Champions in 1943 and 1945)
- Rahealty (Amalgamated into Thurles Gaels)
- Thurles Fennellys (Amalgamated into Thurles Gaels)
- Thurles Kickhams (Amalgamated into Thurles Gaels)
- Tubberadora (3-time Tipperary and All-Ireland Senior Hurling Champions)

=== Moved to West Tipperary in 1930 ===
- Cashel King Cormacs (Also competed in South Tipperary)
- Clonoulty-Rossmore
