= CLG Cill Chomáin =

Gaelic games club in County Mayo, Ireland

Cill Chomáin
- CLG Cill Chomáin
- County: Mayo
- Colours: White and black
- Grounds: Lenarevagh, Glenamoy

Playing kits
Standard colours

Senior Club Championships
	All Ireland	Connacht champions	Mayo champions
Football:	-	-	0

CLG Cill Chomáin is a Gaelic football club located in Kilcommon in north-western County Mayo. The club colours are white and black.

== History ==
Cill Chomáin won the Mayo Junior Football Championship in 2005 and 2013, beating Castlebar Bs and Ardnaree respectively.

Cill Chomáin reached the Mayo Junior County final in 2021 where they were beaten by Kilmeena.
