= Knocknabola =

Townland in County Mayo, Ireland

Coordinates: 53.85°N 9.54°W

Knocknabola or Knocknaboley (Irish: Cnoc na Buaile, meaning 'hill of the cattle-fold') is a townland in the parish of Kilmeena which is located between Newport and Westport in County Mayo, Ireland. It is a small townland, of approximately 1.27 km^{2} (0.49 sq mi), in the Electoral Division of Derryloughan. As of the 2011 census, Knocknaboley had a population of 55 people.
