= Peter Quinn (Gaelic footballer) =

Irish Gaelic footballer

Personal information
- Native name: Peadar Ó Cuinn (Irish)
- Born: 1925 Ballina, County Mayo, Ireland
- Died: 30 January 2016 (aged 90) Enniscrone, County Sligo, Ireland
- Occupation: Roman Catholic priest

Sport
- Sport: Gaelic football
- Position: Wing-back
Club
- Years: Club
- Ardnaree Sarsfields
Club titles
- Mayo titles: 0
Inter-county
- Years: County
- 1948–1951: Mayo
Inter-county titles
- Connacht titles: 4
- All-Irelands: 2
- NFL: 0

Peter Quinn (1925 – 30 January 2016), also credited as Peter Quinlan (to avoid the ban on clerics playing inter county football), was an Irish Gaelic footballer who played as a wing-back at senior level for the Mayo county team.

== Biography ==
Born near Ballina, County Mayo, Quinn was introduced to Gaelic football during his schooling at St Muredach's College. At club level he first lined out as a minor with Ardnaree before later joining the senior team.

Quinn made his debut on the inter-county scene when he first linked up with the Mayo senior team. He went on to play a key role during a hugely successful era, and won two All-Ireland medals and four Connacht medals. He was an All-Ireland runner-up on one occasion.

Quinn retired from inter-county football following the conclusion of the 1951 championship.

Fr Quinn was a native of Quignashee, Ballina, and was ordained in Dalgan Park, Navan, County Meath, for the Columban Missionaries in 1950. His brother Des was also a Columban Fathers.

After spending several years engaged in fundraising activities for the missionary work of the Columban Fathers, Fr. Quinn became pastor of St. James Church in Lake Placid, Florida, in 1979. In 1982, he was installed as the first pastor of St. Anthony Church in Lakeland, Florida, remaining in that position until 1996. He relocated to the Daytona Beach area, assisting with local parishes, and then returned to Ireland.

== Honours ==
Mayo

- All-Ireland Senior Football Championship (2): 1950, 1951
- Connacht Senior Football Championship (4): 1948, 1949, 1950, 1951
