= Robbie McCallion =

Irish Gaelic footballer

Robert McCallion
Personal information
- Nickname: Robbie
- Born: 9 August 1979 Swinford, County Mayo, Ireland
- Died: 7 April 2009 (aged 29) Beaumont Hospital, Dublin
- Occupation: Garda

Sport
Club
- Years: Club
- Swinford
Inter-county
- Years: County
- Mayo

Robert McCallion (9 August 1979 – 7 April 2009) was an Irish Gaelic footballer. He played for Swinford and the senior and under-21 Mayo county teams.

McCallion played for his local club Swinford and was part of their teams from the under-10 grade and upwards. He was part of the Swinford minor team which won every match it played in 1997. He won the Mayo Intermediate Football Championship with Swinford in 1999.

McCallion's family included numerous members of the Garda Síochána, including a parent, brother, uncles and a cousin. He initially worked with Corrib Oil but joined the Gardaí on 7 February 2005. He was killed while serving as a member of the Garda Síochána; initially injured in Letterkenny on 26 March 2009, he was brought to Beaumont Hospital, Dublin, where he died less than two weeks later. He was afforded a state funeral. A memorial stone in his honour is located in Bernard McGlinchey Town Park in Letterkenny. Robert McCallion Memorial Park in Swinford, County Mayo, is named after him. A number of Gaelic football matches have been played in his honour, including one in 2016.
