= Kilmeena =

Village in County Mayo, Ireland

Kilmeena Cill Mhíona
- Civil parish
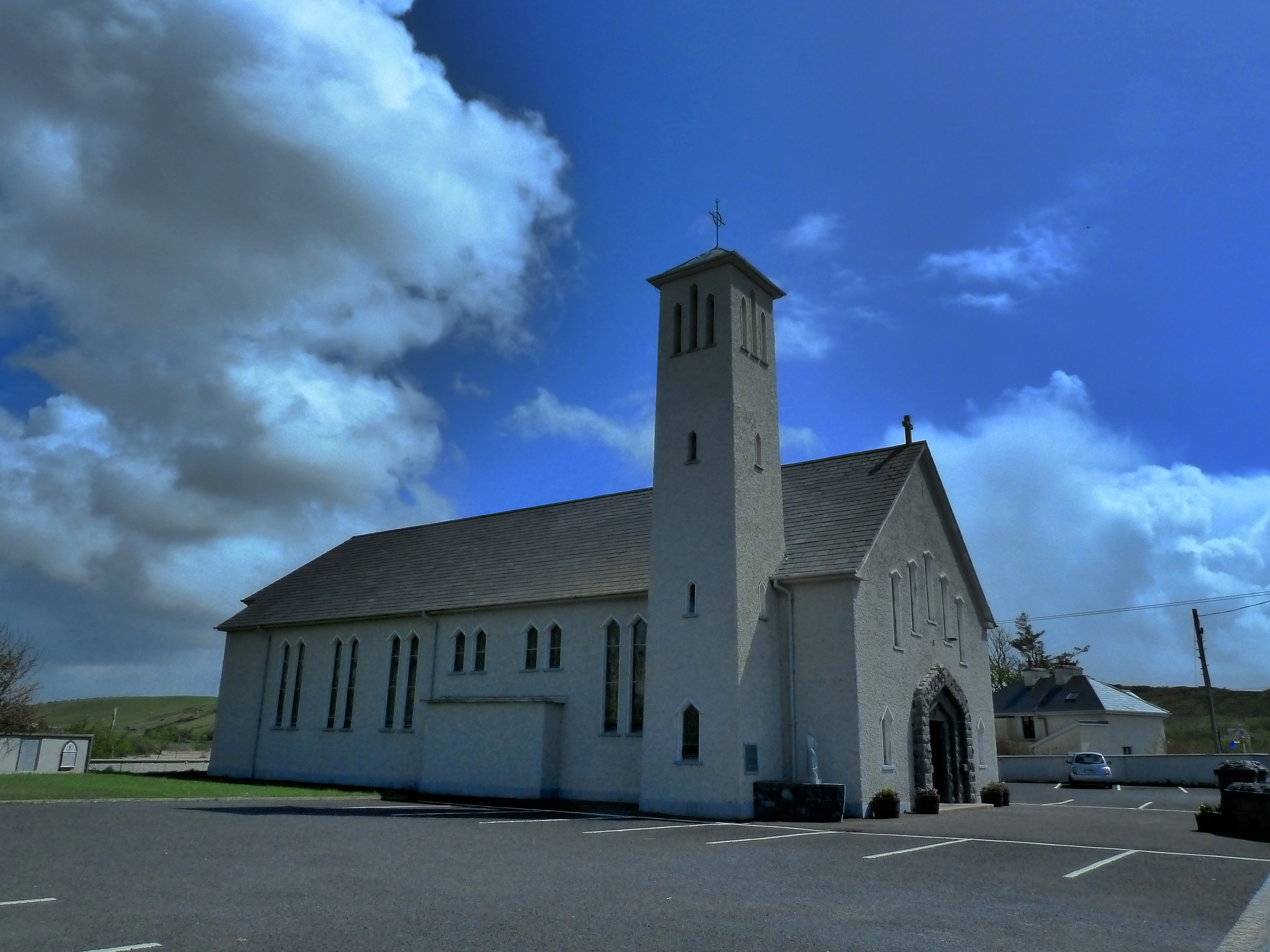
- St Brendans Catholic church in Kilmeena

- Location in Ireland
- Coordinates: 53.8437°N 9.5745°W
- Country: Ireland
- Province: Connacht
- County: County Mayo
- Irish Grid Reference: L964892

Kilmeena (Irish: Cill Mhíona) is a civil parish and small village near Westport in County Mayo, Ireland. The area is served by a Roman Catholic church, an An Post post office, and a national (primary) school.

== History ==
The Kilmeena ambush was the scene of a defeat for the local Irish Republican Army during the Irish War of Independence. On 19 May 1921, British troops surprised an IRA ambush party at Kilmeena. Five IRA men were killed and four were wounded and captured. The remainder of the column fled over the mountains to Skerdagh. One Royal Irish Constabulary man and one Black and Tans member were also killed in the action.

== Sport ==
Kilmeena GAA Club was founded in 1889. According to the club's records, the club first fielded a Gaelic football team against Westport at Kilmeena on 10 March 1889. The club was reputedly affiliated to the Mayo county board in the same year. The club's grounds at Saint Brendan's Park were first opened in 1938, and a new club house was formally opened in 2000. In 2022, Kilmeena won the All-Ireland Junior Club Football Championship with a win over Gneeveguilla of County Kerry at Croke Park.

== Song ==
In 1884, George Cooper and John Rogers Thomas wrote a song Sweet Flower of Kilmeena.

== See also ==
- Knocknabola
