= Shankill GAA =

Gaelic games club in County Dublin, Ireland

- Seanchill CLG
- Founded: 2013
- County: Dublin
- Colours: White, Blue and Green
- Grounds: Shanganagh Cliffs and Stonebridge Road, Shankill, County Dublin
- Coordinates: 53.2403°N 6.1133°W

Playing kits
Standard colours

Shankill GAA is a Gaelic Athletic Association (GAA) club based in the Shankill area, in south County Dublin. The club was reformed in 2013. The club has adult men's and ladies' Gaelic football teams, along with boys' and girls' football, hurling, and camogie teams at underage levels.

== History ==
The earliest records of a GAA team in Shankill date from November 1911. This club, Shankill Shilmaliers, was named after the barony of Shelmalier in County Wexford, a place associated with the 1798 rebellion. A report from Sunday 5 November 1911 refers to a match between the Foxrock Geraldines and Shankill Shilmaliers. According to the report, the "Referee deemed it unwise to continue the game" while "Shilmaliers were leading by 1 goal 1 point to 1 point". According to the account, following an injury and a "very heavy shower", it was decided "to refix the match to be played for the full time at Shankill on Sunday. Mr J J Clare to Referee". It reportedly took several replays to decide the outcome of the fixture.

The modern club, Shankill GAA, was formed in 2013. A Ladies' Gaelic football team was established in October 2017 and played its first league game in early 2018. In 2021, the club's mens football team reached the final of the Dublin Junior 2 Football Championship, losing out to Ballyfermot De La Salle on a scoreline of 3-15 to 2-8.

As of 2026, the club was fielding teams in Gaelic football, hurling and camogie, with the men's team contesting the Junior H Division of the Dublin Junior Hurling Championship.
