= Thurles Gaels GAA =

Gaelic games club in County Tipperary, Ireland

- Gaeil Durlas Éile
- Founded: 2005
- County: Tipperary
- Colours: Black/Green and Gold
- Grounds: Kickham Park
- Coordinates: 52.674144°N 7.796774°W

Playing kits
Standard colours

Thurles Gaels GAA is a Tipperary GAA club which is located in County Tipperary, Ireland. Both hurling and Gaelic football are played in the Mid-Tipperary divisional competitions. The club is centred on the town of Thurles and its hinterland and is a combination of three clubs: Thurles Kickhams, Rahealty and Thurles Fennellys. The club was formed in 2005 under the name "Thurles KRF" it later changed its name to "Thurles Gaels" in 2009. In 2006 the decision was made to start a Juvenile Club.

== Honours ==
- Mid Tipperary Minor B Hurling Championship (1): 2017 (Combo-Thurles Gaels & Moyne Templetouhy)
- Mid Tipperary Minor B Football Championship (2): 2000, 2017 (Combo-Thurles Gaels & Moyne Templetouhy)
- Mid Tipperary Under-21 B Football Championship (1): 1999
- Mid Tipperary Under-21 C Football Championship (1): 2002
- Tipperary Ladies Junior Football Novice Championship (1): 2012
