= Lahardane McHales GAA =

Gaelic football club in County Mayo, Ireland

Lahardane McHales
- CLG Leathardán Mhic Eíl
- Founded: 1966
- County: Mayo
- Colours: Home - Black and Amber Away - Red and White
- Grounds: Bofeenaun pitch
- Coordinates: 53.985071,-9.324142

Lahardane McHales GAA (CLG Leathardán Mhic Eíl) is a Gaelic football club located in Lahardane, County Mayo, Ireland. The club draws players from the parish of Addergoole. The present club was established in 1966 and is named after Archbishop John MacHale, a native of the parish. Lahardane McHales' club colours are black and amber. The club won its first Junior title in 2017 defeating Kilmaine and winning their second junior title in 2023 defeating Shrule Glencorrib 2-10 to 0-11 on their first attempt after being relegated in 2022. They subsequently won the Connacht Junior Football Championship, beating Ballymote (Sligo) 1-15 to 3-5 in 2017 and repeated the achievement in 2023 by defeating Owenmore Gaels (Sligo) 3-11 to 1-12.

== Achievements ==
- Mayo Junior Football Championship: (2)
  - 2017, 2023
- Connacht Junior Club Football Championship (2)
  - 2017, 2023

== Club Establishment ==
The present club was founded in 1966, reviving organised club football within Addergoole parish. It adopted the name Lahardane MacHales in honour of local, Archbishop John MacHale.

== Development of Grounds ==
Initially, the club had no permanent grounds and played matches in a field made available by a local farmer in Lahardane. It measured approximately 96 yards by 60 yards and championship games were played in this field for a number of years.

On Sunday 4th May 1980 MacHale Community Park, Bofeenaun was officially opened. Reports from the time suggest almost £8,000 has been spent developing the pitch and clubhouse. The official opening began with a blessing by Most Rev. Dr McDonnell, Bishop of Kilalla, followed by a match between Lahardane and Crossmolina. Dr Mickey Loftus was scheduled to perform the official opening at 3.30 p.m followed by a senior inter-county football match between Mayo and Donegal.

In 1999 the playing area of the football field was extended in length and breadth to the required dimensions.

=== Inter-county matches at MacHale Community Park ===
MacHale Community Park was advertised as the venue for a senior inter-county match between Mayo and Donegal on 4th May 1980, as part of the official opening of the grounds.

A further match between Mayo and Fermanagh was scheduled for 3rd April 1988 as part of a day commemorating Lahardane player, Padraic Garrett.

== County junior final appearances ==
- 1976 vs Parke-Keelogues-Crimlin
- 1985 vs Islandeady
- 2017 vs Kilmaine
- 2023 vs Shrule/Glencorrib

== 1976 Junior Final ==
Lahardane were defeated by Parke by 1-6 to 1-4 in the 1976 Mayo Junior Football Championship final at MacHale Park, Castlebar.

Parke controlled the first half, with a goal from Michael O'Boyle helping them to establish a four-point interval lead. Tommy Leonard scored Lahardane's two first-half points from long range frees.

Lahardane reduced the deficit with a point early in the second half, but had a goal disallowed in the 40th minute. Parke subsequently extended their advantage to five points and still held that lead with ten minutes remaining.

With five minutes left, Michael Jordan punched a floated free into the net to bring Lahardane back into contention despite late pressure, Lahardane could not close the gap, and Parke held on to win by two points.

Lahardane: P. Gilger; M. Barrett, J. McHale, B. McGreevy; E. Rowland, J. Rowland, J. Devaney; J. McGreevy, T. Leonard; K. Leonard, J. Kelly, M. Jordan; W. Gilger, P. Rowland, Fr. G. Gillespie.

Substitutes: P. Forde for K. Leonard; K. Leonard for G. Gillespie; F. Granaghan for P. Rowland.

== 1985 Junior Final ==
Lahardane were defeated by Islandeady by 2-8 to 1-5 in their second Mayo Junior Football Championship final appearance at Park's Community Sports Ground in 1985.

Islandeady led by 1-2 to 0-2 at halt time, with Stephen Sweeney scoring their first goal in the 29th minute. Lahardane struggled to convert their scoring opportunities, while Islandeady made better use of their chances. Brendan McCormack scored Islaneady's second goal twelve minutes from the end. Lahardane continued to press, and substitute William Barrett scored a late goal to reduced the deficit to five points. Islandeady nevertheless held on to retain the county junior title.

Lahardane: P. Gilgar; P. Naughton, K. Gilgar, F. Devaney; P. Leonard (0-2), P. Garrett, S. Granaghan; J. Loftus (0-1), G. Leonard; J. Devaney (0-1), J. Kelly (0-1), M. Harte; P. Forde, J. Rowland, M. Jordan.

Substitutes: W. Barrett (1-0) for M. Jordan; P. Lyke for P. Leonard.

== 2017 Junior Final ==
Lahardane won their first Mayo Junior Football Championship title in 2017 defeating Kilmaine by 2-11 to 0-15 at MacHale Park, Castlebar. Managed by John Maughan and captained by Gary Naughton, the team secured the title 51 years after the club's foundation.

Kilmaine started strongly, scoring twice in the opening minute and established a 0-10 to 0-5 halt time lead. Lahardane reduced the deficit early in the second half before James Maughan scored a goal in the 37th minute. Kilmaine regained control, however, and led by 0-14 to 1-7 heading into the final quarter. Lahardane rallied again, with substitute Michael Coleman scoring their second goal in the 54th minute. Lahardane secured the result with Adrian Leonard converting a kick for a point from a penalty to secure a two point victory.

Lahardane: J. Mulhern; B. Leonard, C. Coleman, P. O’Malley; P. Coleman, M. Queenan, C. Rowland; T. Dever, G. Naughton; A. Murphy, A. Leonard (0–8), M. Noone (0–1); S. Loftus (0–1), J. Maughan (1–1), K. Loftus.

Substitutes: C. Reilly, M. Coleman (1–0), G. Mulhern, J. Maughan.

== 2023 Junior Final ==
Lahardane won their second Mayo Junior Football Championship title in 2023, at the first time of asking after being relegated from Intermediate in 2022. The side managed by Eddie Conroy defeated Shrule/Glencorrib by 2-10 to 0-11 at Hasting Insurance MacHale Park, Castlebar.

The sides were level at five points a piece at half-time. Mark Noone put Lahardane ahead just 24 seconds into the second half. Shane Finnerty and Adrian Leonard added points before Noone's first goal extending Lahardane's lead. Shrule/Glencorrib reduced the deficit to two points but Noone's second goal gave Lahardane a five-point advantage with less than ten minutes remaining.

Lahardane: John Queenan; Barry Leonard, Cathal Finnerty, Kieran Lynn; Aaron Murphy, Jarlath Maughan, Aodan Cronin; Kyran Jordan, Shane Finnerty (0–3); Shane Loftus, James Maughan (0–1), Mark Noone (2–1); Matthew Maughan (0–2), Darragh Walsh (0-1), Adrian Leonard (0–2).

Substitutes: Chris Rowland for Jarlath Maughan (42 minutes); Benny Joyce for Aidan Cronin (45); Mickey Murphy for Shane Loftus (54); Jack MaHale for Matthew Maughan (57); Declan Langan for Kieran Lynn (59).

== Notable People ==
=== Jackie Carney ===
Lahardane native Jackie Carney played club football with Ballina Stephenites and was a member of the Mayo team that won the 1936 All-Ireland Senior Football Championship. He later served alongside Gerald Courell as co-trainer of the Mayo teams that won consecutive All-Ireland titles in 1950 and 1951.

== External sources ==
- Club Website
