= CLG Thuar Mhic Éadaigh =

Gaelic games club in County Mayo, Ireland

Tuar Mhic Éadaigh
- CLG Thuar Mhic Éadaigh
- Founded: 1965
- County: Mayo
- Nickname: Tourmak'
- Colours: Black and White or White and Black
- Grounds: Páirc Naomh Muire or Páirc an Choláiste
- Coordinates: 53.662527, -9.353418

Playing kits
Standard colours

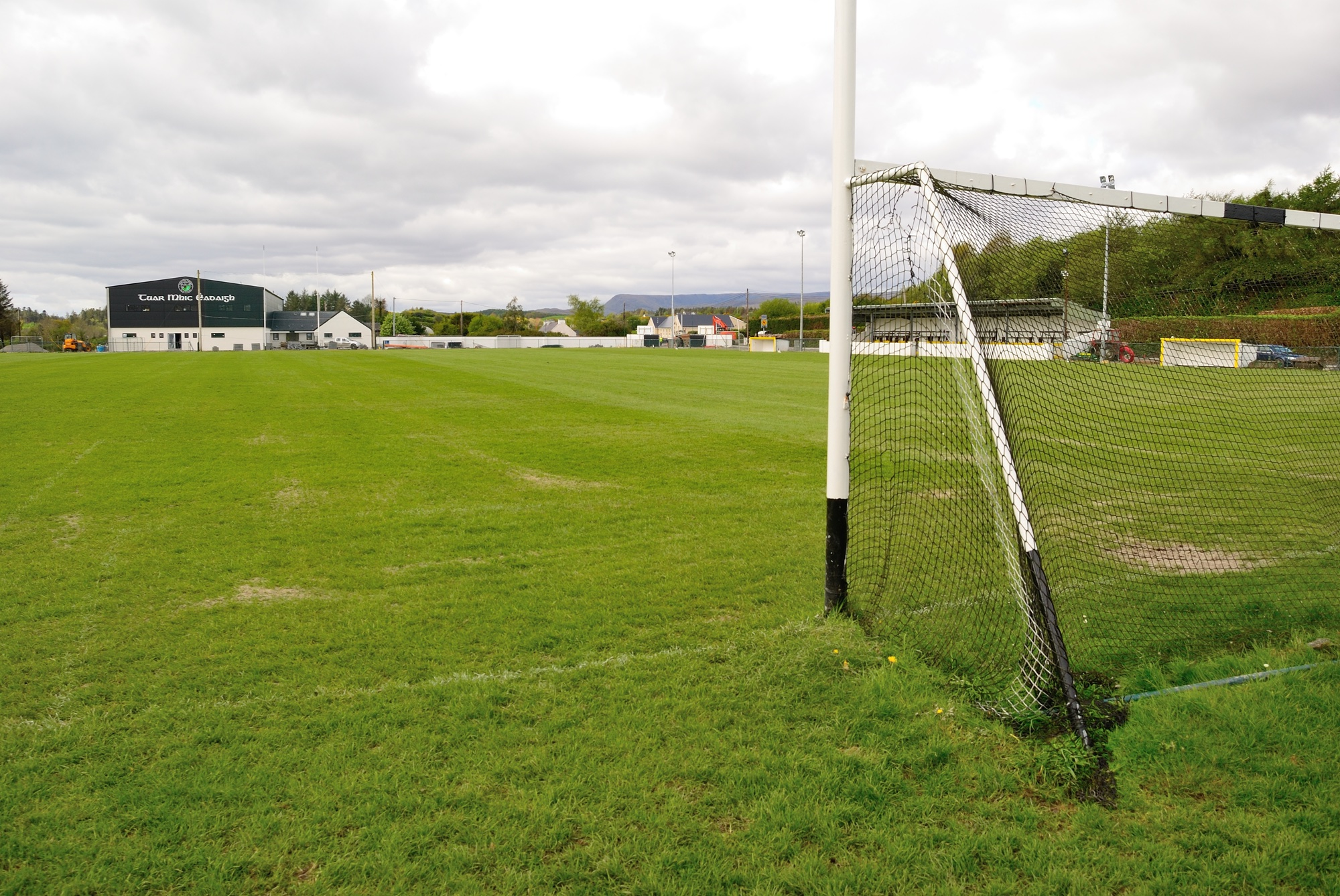
Páirc Naomh Muire, facing south

CLG Thuar Mhic Éadaigh is a Gaeltacht, Gaelic football club located in the village of Tourmakeady, in south west of County Mayo.

CLG Thuar Mhic Éadaigh hosted the Comórtas Peile na Gaeltachta in June 2017.

The club has two pitches, a stand, club house, state of the art sports hall facility – known as the Ionad Spóirt, skills wall, handball alley and will have an astroturf pitch soon.

The club plays in west Mayo for competition purposes.

== Honours ==
CLG Thuar Mhic Éadaigh (Ireland)
- Connacht Intermediate Club Football Championship 2006
- Connacht Junior Club Football Championship: 1998
- Mayo Intermediate Football Championship: 1982, 2006, 2010
- Mayo Junior Football Championship: 1979, 1998
- Mayo Senior Ladies Football Championship: 1982
- Mayo Intermediate Ladies Football Championship: 2001
- Mayo Junior Ladies Football Championship: 1994, 2010
- Mayo U13 Championship Division 3, 2022
