= Durlas Óg GAA =

Gaelic games club in County Tipperary, Ireland

Dúrlas Óg GAA
- Founded: 1979
- County: Tipperary
- Colours: Red and white
- Grounds: Páirc na nÓg

Playing kits
Standard colours

Dúrlas Óg GAA is a juvenile Tipperary GAA club which is located in Thurles, County Tipperary, in Ireland. The club field teams at under 12, under 14, under 16 and minor age groups and their home pitch is Páirc na nÓg in Thurles. After minor level, club members progress to Thurles Sarsfields GAA. The club won the Féile na nGael All-Ireland Division 1 hurling title in 1990 and 2022. The club is member of Mid Tipperary GAA.
