= Cumann Peile Na bPiarsaigh (Gaillimhe) =

Gaelic sports club in County Galway, Ireland

Cumann Peile Na bPiarsaigh is a Gaelic Athletic Association club based in the Ros Muc, Camus and Recess areas in Connemara, County Galway, Ireland. The club is a member of the Galway GAA. Cumann Peile Na bPiarsaigh GAA Club caters for large numbers of young boys and girls and adults who play Football and Ladies Football in the parishes of Ros Muc, Camus and Recess.

== History ==
The club was founded in 1959.
