= CLG Oileáin Árann =

Gaelic sports club in County Galway, Ireland

- Cumann Lúthchleas Gael Oileáin Árann
- Founded: 1992
- County: Galway
- Coordinates: 53°06′21.95″N 9°39′17.02″W

Playing kits
Standard colours

CLG Oileáin Árann (Cumann Lúthchleas Gael Oileáin Árann) is a Gaelic Athletic Association club based on the three Aran Islands in the Gaeltacht, County Galway, Ireland. It caters for the sporting and social needs of the people of the Islands through Gaelic football. There are many age groups within the club including minor, under 16 and junior.

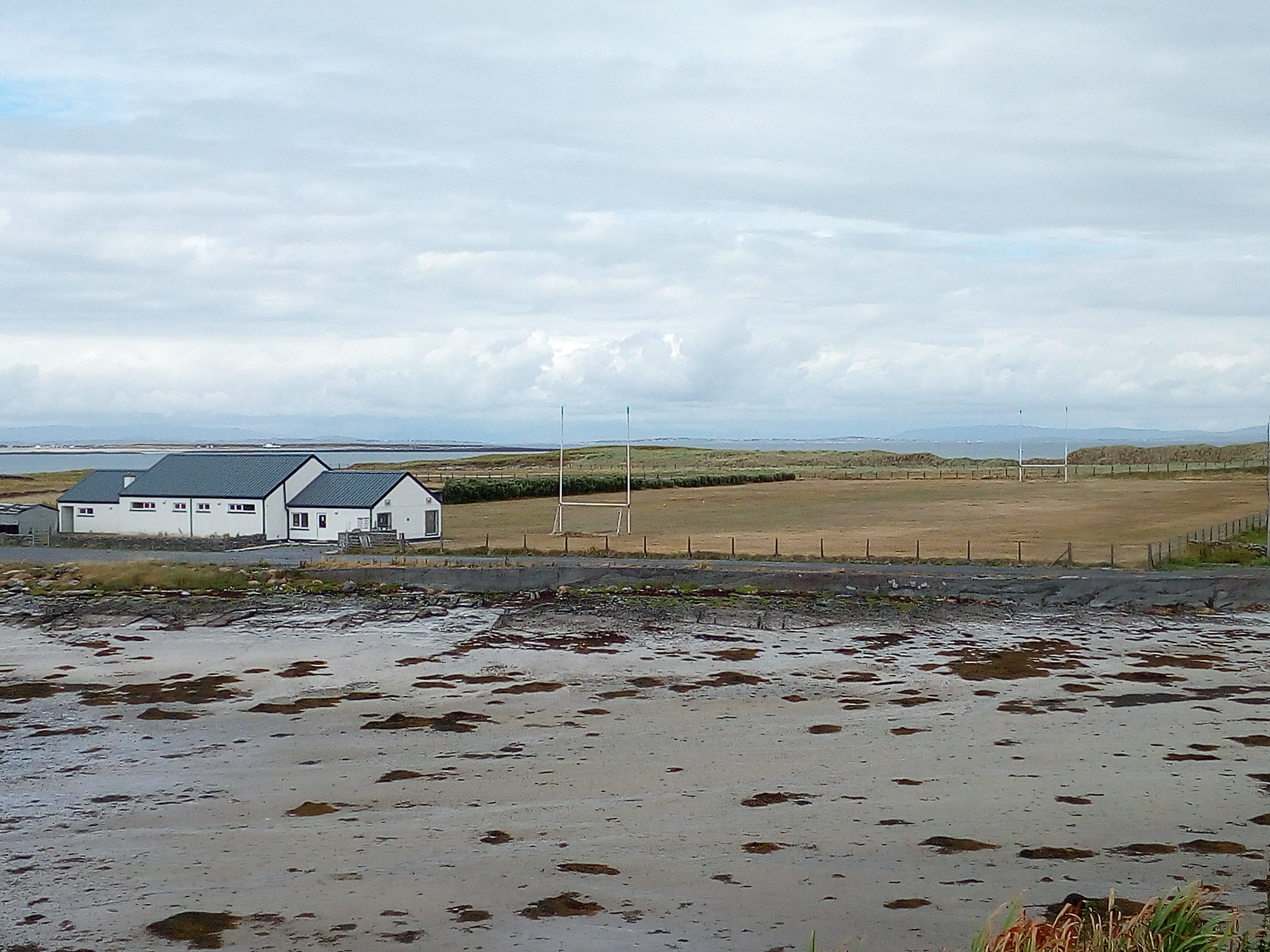
CLG Oileáin Árann

== Achievements ==
- Connacht Junior Club Football Championship: Winners 2014
