= Knock GAA =

Gaelic sports club in County Tipperary, Ireland

Knock GAA is a Gaelic Athletic Association in Tipperary, Ireland. The club is part of the Mid Tipperary GAA division.
