= Inner City Tournament =

- Founded: 1982
- Title holders: O'Tooles (6th title)
- First winner: O'Tooles
- Most titles: St Joseph's/OCB (7 titles)
- Sponsors: IFSC Dublin Inner City Trust

The Annual Inner City Tournament is a Gaelic football tournament between Gaelic Athletic Association clubs from Inner City Dublin. The tournament first began in 1982 with O'Tooles GAC winning the inaugural competition.

== Top winners ==
#	Team	Wins	Years won
1	St Joseph's/OCB	7	1991, 1993, 1999, 2001, 2002, 2003, 2004, 2012
2	O'Tooles	7	1982, 1983, 1984, 1994, 2000,2015,2016
3	O'Connell Boy's	3	1985, 1987, 1989
	CLANNA GAEL FONTENOY	3	1995, 1997, 1998
	Parnells		2009, 2010, 2011
6	St Vincents	2	2005, 2006
	STARLIGHTS	2	1992, 1996
8	Craobh Chiaráin	1	1986
	Clontarf	1	1988
	Trinity Gaels	1	2022
	St Joseph's/OCB 2nds	1	2008

  - No winner in 1990
  - St Joseph's/OCB and St Joseph's/OCB 2nd team both reached the final in 2008 with the match ending in a draw. However the 2nd team did win 4-2 on a penalty shoot out to get the winners trophies but both the first and second team decided to share the cup.
