= Ranelagh Gaels GAA =

GAA club in County Dublin

- CLG Gaeil Raghnallach
- Founded: 2003
- County: Dublin
- Colours: Sky Blue and Navy

Playing kits
Standard colours

Ranelagh Gaels GAA (CLG Gaeil Raghnallach in Irish) is a Gaelic Athletic Association club located in Ranelagh, South Dublin, Ireland. The club serves the Dublin 4 and Dublin 6 areas. They field teams in hurling, Gaelic football and Ladies' Gaelic football. Football, hurling and camogie, for boys and girls, are played in their underage setup.

The club was founded in 2003. They started off with a single men's football team and a few years later the women's team came into being. The women's team won the Dublin Junior E Championship in their first year in 2010 and in 2019 added a Junior D title. The men's team won the Dublin Junior 2 Football Championship at Parnell Park in 2018.

The club's underage section started in 2012. The Juvenile Academy offers Gaelic games coaching for children from age four upwards. They have teams from under-8 in Dublin competitions.

As of 2024, the club's mens football team were competing in Division 6 of the Dublin leagues and in Dublin Intermediate Football Championship The hurling team line out in the Dublin Junior H Championship.

As of 2024, the games promotion officer for the club was former Dublin hurler Simon Lambert.

Adult teams play their home games, and train during the summer, on the main pitch in Bushy Park. The Juvenile Academy takes place in Donnybrook Stadium.

== Honours ==
=== Ladies' football ===
- Dublin Junior E Championship 2010
- Dublin Junior D Championship 2019

=== Men's football ===
- Dublin Junior 2 Championship 2018
