= Killea GAA =

Gaelic games club in County Tipperary, Ireland

- Founded: 1886
- County: Tipperary
- Colours: Red and white
- Grounds: Tommy Treacy Park, Killea

Killea GAA is a Gaelic Athletic Association club associated with the village of Killea in North County Tipperary, Ireland. The club is a member of Mid Tipperary GAA.

== Honours ==
- Mid Tipperary Senior Hurling Championship (1): 1928 (with Castleiney)
- Mid Tipperary Junior A Hurling Championship (3): 1927, 1989, 1991
- Mid Tipperary Junior B Hurling Championship (2): 2007 2026

== Notable players ==
- Tommy Treacy
