= Louisburgh GAA =

Gaelic games club in County Mayo, Ireland

- CLG Cluain Cearbán
- Founded: 1929
- County: Mayo
- Colours: Black and Amber

Playing kits
Standard colours

Senior Club Championships
	All Ireland	Connacht champions	Mayo champions
Football:	-	-	0

Louisburgh GAA (Gaelige: CLG Cluain Cearbán) is a Gaelic football club located in Louisburgh, County Mayo, Ireland. They are based in west Mayo.

== Achievements ==
- Connacht Junior Club Football Championship Winners 2016
- Mayo Intermediate Football Championship Winners 1995, 2003
- Mayo Junior Football Championship Winners 1994, 2016
