= Islandeady GAA =

Gaelic football club

- Oileán Éadaigh
- Founded: 1904
- County: Mayo
- Colours: Green, White, Black shorts

Playing kits
Standard colours

Senior Club Championships
	All Ireland	Connacht champions	Mayo champions
Football:	-	-	0

Islandeady GAA (Gaelige: CLG Oileán Éadaigh) is a Gaelic football club located in Islandeady, County Mayo. The club was founded in 1904 and currently competes in the Mayo Intermediate Football Championship.

Islandeady won the 1974 West Mayo championship defeating Westport in the final on a scoreline of 1-5 to 1-2 and captained by John Fitzgerald, they went on to capture the County Junior championship beating Bohola 2-3 to 1-2 in the final.

The following year Islandeady were playing at the Intermediate grade for the first time in the history of the club. Not content with just participating at a higher level, Islandeady went on to win out the championship by defeating Balla in the semi final and Ballinrobe in the final at MacHale Park, in Castlebar, captained by Peter Collins snr.

The club was now in the Senior football grade all in the space of two years, an achievement. Though matching some more experienced teams in the County and reaching the County league final and Senior championship semi final, the major trophies eluded them.

The club won the Junior championship in 2011 and were promoted to Intermediate level. The club were relegated to Junior level in 2020.

In 2022, the club had more success winning Mayo Junior Championship, Defeating Cill Comainn in the final on a score line of 2:11 to 1:07. Islandeady were then defeated by Clifden in the Connacht Junior championship semi final.

Former Taoiseach Enda Kenny played for the club.

== Honours ==
- West Mayo Junior & County Title: 1974, 1985
- Mayo Intermediate Football Championship: 1975
- Mayo Junior Football Championship: 1959, 1974, 1988, 1990, 2011, 2022
