= Bonniconlon GAA =

Gaelic games club in County Mayo, Ireland

- CLG Muine Chonnalláin
- County: Mayo
- Colours: Sky Blue and Navy
- Grounds: Bonniconlon

Playing kits
Standard colours

Senior Club Championships
	All Ireland	Connacht champions	Mayo champions
Football:	-	-	0

Bonniconlon GAA (Irish: CLG Muine Chonnalláin) is a Gaelic football club located in the north County Mayo, Ireland. Based in the village of Bonniconlon, the club participates in competitions organised by the Mayo GAA county board.

== Honours ==
- Mayo Intermediate Football Championship (2): 1986, 1997
- Mayo Junior Football Championship (1): 1978
- North Mayo Junior Football Championship (1): 1978
