= Moy Davitts GAA =

Gaelic games club in County Mayo, Ireland

Bohola-Moy Davitts
- Both Chomla Daibheidigh na Muaidhe
- County: Mayo
- Colours
- Coordinates: 53°59′32.83″N 9°06′48.94″W

Playing kits
Standard colours

Bohola-Moy Davitts is a Gaelic Athletic Association club based in Foxford, County Mayo, Ireland. The club fields Gaelic football teams in competitions organized by the Mayo GAA county board. The team's nickname is the "Moy Boys"

== History ==
While a tradition of Gaelic football in the area dates back to the founding of the GAA in the late 19th century, the present club was founded in the early 1970s. Former teams from the area included Bohola, Foxford, Toomore, Killasser, Ballyvarry and the Foxford Geraldines in 1898. From the late 1880s, football was played generally in the meadowlands along the River Moy at (Sraith Garbh) Shrahgarrow, close to the current club's field. Some matches were played in Aughaward in a field known locally as Sraith Buach. Local teams affiliated to the East Mayo Board under a variety of names, Foxford, Toomore, Ballyvary, Bohola and latterly, Moy Davitts, an amalgamation of Bohola, Foxford and Straide.

It was decided, in the 1940s, to acquire a new pitch and a meeting took place in Foxford where ten people guaranteed £40 each toward the purchase of a pitch for £400. Through the purchasing and swapping of several strips of land, an area of approximately 6 acres (24,000 m^{2}) was eventually bought in the 1950s, and some development work commenced.

In January 1974, a group of footballers and supporters from the Bohola, Straide and Foxford areas met at the old Bohola School. At that meeting, it was decided to form a Bohola football club. The then parish priest, Fr Martin Mac Manus, was installed as the first chairman of the club.

In its first year in existence, the club won the Divisional Junior title defeating a fancied Charlestown, later defeating Lacken in the county semi-final and narrowly losing to Islandeady in the county final. The club then known as Bohola was promoted to Intermediate status for the 1975 season.

Moy Davitts seems to have emerged organically from among the players of both clubs as much out of necessity as by any formal decision of either club's officers. There was no Junior club in Foxford at this time and players from the Foxford area tended to play for Ballyvarry or in some cases Knockmore. Bohola club was formed in 1974 and the Foxford players played for the Junior team, winning the East Mayo title and getting to the county final. Fielding two separate teams from among two small populations was difficult. The under-16s, minors and under-21s of Bohola and Foxford played together from 1976 onwards. This became the practice and eventually it was decided that a formal amalgamation was in the best interests of all the players.

Following a meeting of the Foxford club, Bohola GAA Club changed its name to Moy Davitts in 1977, a name which better represented the three parishes along the banks of the River Moy; Straide, native place of Michael Davitt; Bohola, birthplace of the Irish-American athlete Martin Sheridan, and Foxford, the birthplace of the great Argentinian Admiral William Brown.

== Achievements ==
- Mayo Intermediate Football Championship: 1996, 2017
- Mayo Minor A Football Championship: 2014, 2022
- Mayo Under-21 A Football Championship: 2013
- Celebrity Bainisteoir: 2012
