= Achill GFC =

- CLG Acla
- Founded: 1941
- County: Mayo
- Nickname: Boys in green
- Colours: Green and White
- Grounds: Davitt Park

Playing kits
Standard colours

Senior Club Championships
	All Ireland	Connacht champions	Mayo champions
Football:	0	0	0

Achill GFC is a Gaelic football club which represents Achill Island and the Currane Peninsula. The club was founded in 1941. Although the area was not new to Gaelic games, there never existed a club as such to bring together the footballers of the numerous villages to play as one team and represent the parish itself. The Junior footballers contested their first ever West Mayo Championship in 1942 and not only did they win that, they also proceeded to capture the County title. They have recently announced that they will have won a Junior County title by 2024.

== Achievements ==
- Mayo Junior Football Championship: (6)
  - 1942, 1965, 1983, 1991, 1995, 2007
- West Mayo Junior Football Championship: (9)
  - 1942, 1949, 1952, 1953, 1958, 1965, 1983, 1991, 1995
- Mayo Juvenile/Minor A Football Championship: (1)
  - 1964

== External sources ==
- Achill GAA website
