= Ballyfermot Gaels GAA =

Gaelic games club in County Dublin, Ireland

- Baile Formáid Gaels
- Founded: 1953
- County: Dublin
- Colours: Green and Gold
- Grounds: Drumfin/Glenaulin Sports Park, Ballyfermot, Dublin 10

Playing kits
Standard colours

Ballyfermot Gaels GAA is a Gaelic Athletic Association club in based in the Ballyfermot area of Dublin.

The club was founded in 1953 and was known as Ballyfermot Gaels at that time and was then known as Ballyfermot De La Salle, before reverting in 2025.

The club has adult football and juvenile teams at various levels.

The club plays in the Kerry colours as a tribute to the first parish priest, Kerryman Charles Canon Troy who sponsored the club.

== Honours ==
- Dublin Under 21 Hurling Championship Winners 1964
- Duffy Cup Winners 2017
- Dublin Junior E Football Championship Champions 2017
- Dublin AFL Division 10 Champions 2017
- Dublin AFL Division 9 Champions 2018
- Dublin AFL Division 8 Champions 2019
- Dublin Junior 2 Club Football Championship Champions 2021
