= Balla GAA =

Gaelic games club in County Mayo, Ireland

- Balla Álainn
- Founded: 1886
- County: Mayo
- Nickname: Balla Granuailes
- Colours: Maroon and White
- Grounds: Nally Park

Playing kits
Standard colours

Senior Club Championships
	All Ireland	Connacht champions	Mayo champions
Football:	4	19	33

Balla GAA is a Gaelic Athletic Association club located in the village of Balla in County Mayo, Ireland.

== History ==
The club was founded in 1921.

== Achievements ==
- Mayo Senior Football Championship: Runners-Up 1983
- Mayo Intermediate Football Championship: Winners 2020
- Mayo Junior Football Championship: Winners 1980, 2018

== Notable players ==
- T. J. Kilgallon
- Maurice Sheridan

== External sources ==
- Balla GAA club site
