= Ardnaree Sarsfields GAA =

Gaelic games club in County Mayo, Ireland

- CLG Ard na Riagh
- Founded: 1949
- County: Mayo
- Colours: Green, Gold
- Grounds: Ardnaree, Ballina, County Mayo
- Coordinates: 54.1114°N 9.1424°W

Playing kits
Standard colours

Senior Club Championships
	All Ireland	Connacht champions	Mayo champions
Football:	0	0	0

Ardnaree Sarsfields GAA is a Gaelic football club located in Ballina, County Mayo. The club, which was founded in 1949, competes in competitions organized by Mayo GAA county board and is a member of the North division.

== Honours ==
- Mayo Junior Football Championship (4): 1952, 1959, 1971, 2015
- North Mayo Football Championship (14): 1949, 1950, 1952, 1957, 1958, 1959, 1964, 1966, 1969, 1971, 1979, 2008, 2009, 2010
- Connacht Junior Club Football Championship (1): 2015
- All-Ireland Junior Club Football Championship (0): (runners-up in 2016)

== Notable players ==
- Joe Corcoran, won 2 county junior titles with Ardnaree Sarsfields (1959 and 1971) and a national football league title with Mayo in 1970. He was the long-time record scorer for the Mayo senior team with 19-360 (417 points) until 2012 when Conor Mortimer surpassed his total. Corcoran, known as "Jinking Joe", also served as a club president, manager and selector over his years with the club.
- John Forde, double All-Ireland Senior Football winner with Mayo 1950 and 1951, also served as club president for Ardnaree Sarsfields.
- Fr. Peter Quinn, a club member, was double All-Ireland Senior Football winner with Mayo 1950 and 1951.
