= Swinford GAA =

Gaelic games club in County Mayo, Ireland

- C.L.G. Beal Atha Na Muice
- County: Mayo
- Colours: Black, Red
- Grounds: Robert McCallion Memorial Park

Playing kits
Standard colours

Senior Club Championships
	All Ireland	Connacht champions	Mayo champions
Football:	0	0	0

Swinford GAA (Irish: C.L.G. Beal Atha Na Muice) is a Gaelic Athletic Association (GAA) club based in Swinford, County Mayo. The club plays in the Mayo Intermediate Football Championship and belongs to the East Division.

== History ==
Originally, there were three clubs in the Swinford area: "The Commercials", "The Sextons", and "The Young Ireland". There is no evidence about the foundation of a unique club, but Swinford contested the Mayo final, the first and only one, in 1889, when they lost against Ballina Stephenites GAA.

The current Swinford GAA club is made up of players from four parishes; Swinford, (which was previously known as Kilconduff) as well as Midfield, Meelick and Killasser parishes, also the area of Culmore to the northeast of the town provide players too.

While the club has never won a senior football trophy at county level, the club won a Mayo Senior Hurling Championship title in 1956. Swinford's Gaelic football teams have had some successes at minor level, reaching a Mayo Junior final in 1949 and winning a Mayo Minor title in 1951.

In 2012, the club's main ground, Robert McCallion Memorial Park, was named in honour of Robert McCallion, a Garda and former player with the club who was killed in the line of duty in 2009.

== Honours ==
- Mayo Senior Hurling Championship (1): 1956
- Mayo Senior Football Championship (0): (runners-up in 1899 as "Swinford Sextons")
- Mayo Junior Football Championship (0): (runner-up in 1949)
- Mayo Minor Football Championship (1): 1951
