= Kilmeena GAA =

Gaelic football club in County Mayo, Ireland

Kilmeena
- CLG Cill Mhíodhna
- Founded: 1889
- County: Mayo
- Colours: Black and white
- Grounds: St Brendans Pitch

Playing kits
Standard colours

Senior Club Championships
	All Ireland	Connacht champions	Mayo champions
Football:	-	-	0

Kilmeena GAA (Irish: CLG Cill Mhíodhna) is a Gaelic football club associated with the town of Westport in County Mayo, Ireland.

== History ==
The club was founded in 1889, and first fielded a team against Westport at Kilmeena on 10 March 1889. The club's grounds, Saint Brendan's Park, was opened in 1938, with additional facilities opened subsequently, including a new club house which was opened (by Pat Holmes) in 2000.

Primarily involved in Gaelic football, Kilmeena won the All-Ireland Junior Club Football Championship in 2022.

== Honours ==
- All-Ireland Junior Club Football Championship (1)
  - 2022
- Connacht Junior Club Football Championship (2)
  - 2002, 2022
- Mayo Intermediate Football Championship (1)
  - 2023, 2025
- Mayo Junior Football Championship (5)
  - 1977, 1986, 1993, 2002, 2021
