= Kiltimagh GAA =

Gaelic games club in County Mayo, Ireland

Kiltimagh
- CLG Coillte Mach
- Founded: 1888
- County: Mayo
- Colours: Blue, White
- Grounds: Gilmartin Park

Playing kits
Standard colours

Senior Club Championships
	All Ireland	Connacht champions	Mayo champions
Football:	-	-	0

Kiltimagh GAA (Irish: CLG Coillte Mach) is a Gaelic football club located in Kiltimagh, County Mayo, Ireland. In 2020, Kiltimagh reached the Mayo Intermediate Football Championship final but were defeated by Balla in a "shock result".

== Notable players ==
- Peter Burke
