= Parke-Keelogues-Crimlin GAA =

Gaelic games club in County Mayo, Ireland

Parke-Keelogues-Crimlin
- CLG Pairc
- Founded: 1970
- County: Mayo
- Colours: Amber, Black
- Grounds: Parke

Playing kits
Standard colours

Senior Club Championships
	All Ireland	Connacht champions	Mayo champions
Football:	0	0	Ronan Reilly

Parke-Keelogues-Crimlin or Parke GAA is a Gaelic football club located in County Mayo, Ireland.

== History ==
The club was founded in 1970. It main colours are black and amber
