= 2000–01 All-Ireland Senior Club Football Championship =

- Dates: 1 October 2000 – 17 March 2001
- Teams: 33
- Sponsor: Allied Irish Bank
- Champions: Crossmolina Deel Rovers (1st title); Tom Nallen (captain); Tommy Jordan (manager)
- Runners-up: Nemo Rangers; Larry Kavanagh (captain); Billy Morgan (manager)

Tournament statistics
- Matches played: 34
- Top scorer(s): Pa Kavanagh (1–24)

The 2000–01 All-Ireland Senior Club Football Championship was the 31st staging of the All-Ireland Senior Club Football Championship since its establishment by the Gaelic Athletic Association in 1970–71. The competition began on 1 October 2000 and concluded on 17 March 2001.

The defending champion was Crossmaglen Rangers; however, the club lost to Castleblayney in the Ulster Club SFC quarter-final.

Crossmolina Deel Rovers defeated Nemo Rangers by 0–16 to 1–12 in the final at Croke Park on 17 March 2001 to win the competition. It was the club's first title.

== Connacht ==
=== Quarter-final ===
21 October 2000 Quarter-final	Kilbride	0-09 - 2-14	Crossmolina Deel Rovers	Dr Hyde Park
	F Lohan 0-4, E Lohan 0-4, G Lohan 0-1.		K McDonald 1-6, E Lavelle 1-0, J Leonard 0-2, P McGuinness 0-2, G O'Malley 0-1, M Moyles 0-1, P Gardiner 0-1.

=== Semi-finals ===
5 November 2000 Semi-final	Crossmolina Deel Rovers	1-12 - 1-06	Bunninadden	St Tiernan's Park
	K McDonald 1-2, P McGuinness 0-4, P Gardiner 0-2, M Moyles 0-2, G O'Malley 0-1, F Costello 0-1.		F O'Flaherty 1-3, M Gormely 0-1, A Killoran 0-1, L Gormley 0-1.

12 November 2000 Semi-final	Aughavas	1-07 - 1-09	Corofin	Páirc Seán Mac Diarmada
	C McKiernan 1-1, F McBrien 0-3, F Charles 0-1, S McBrien 0-1, P McLoughlin 0-1.		A O'Donovan 1-4, R Silke 0-1, T Burke 0-1, K Fitzgerald 0-1, D Morris 0-1.

=== Final ===
19 November 2000 Final	Crossmolina Deel Rovers	1-10 - 0-05	Corofin	St Tiernan's Park
	L Moffat 1-0, L Moyles 0-3, J Leonard 0-2, P Gardiner 0-2, P McGuinness 0-2, D Mulligan 0-1.		M Donnellan 0-2, K Comer 0-1, A O'Donovan 0-1, M Kenny 0-1.

== Leinster ==
=== First round ===
22 October 2000 First round	O'Hanrahan's	2-10 - 2-02	Dicksboro	Dr Cullen Park
	A Bowe 1-2, P Kavanagh 0-4, D Bermingham 1-0, M Carpenter 0-2, A Kavanagh 0-2.		C O'Loughlin 1-0, S Kennedy 1-0, J O'Gorman 0-2.

22 October 2000 First round	Newtown Blues	0-11 - 0-05	St Anne's Rathangan	Drogheda Park
	C Kelly 0-5, T Carr 0-3, P Stone 0-1, P Kelly 0-1, K Lynch 0-1.		J Beryr 0-2, P Berry 0-1, D Fogarty 0-1, F Simpson 0-1.

22 October 2000 First round	Dunshaughlin	2-05 - 0-11	Rathnew	Páirc Tailteann
	T Dowd 1-3, D Kealy 1-0, R Kealy 0-1, G Dowd 0-1.		T Gill 0-7, T Doyle 0-3, J Snell 0-1.

22 October 2000 First round	Abbeylara	0-08 - 0-07	St Joseph's	Pearse Park
	P Lynch 0-3, N Sheridan 0-2, J O'Brien 0-1, G Fay 0-1, E Farrell 0-1.		S Kelly 0-2, Mark O'Brien 0-1, A Lacey 0-1, C Kelly 0-1, L Stableton 0-1, T Kelly 0-1.

28 October 2000 First round replay	Rathnew	0-14 - 1-11 (aet)	Dunshaughlin	Aughrim County Ground
	T Gill 0-10, R Coffey 0-2, R Dignam 0-1, S Mitchell 0-1.		M McHale 1-1, R Kealy 0-4, D Crimmins 0-2, T Dowd 0-2, B Kealy 0-1, N Kelly 0-1.

5 November 2000 First round second replay	Dunshaughlin	3-08 - 1-06	Rathnew	Páirc Tailteann
	D Crimmins 2-0, R Kealy 1-1, T Dowd 0-4, D Tonge 0-2, Dermot Kealy 0-1.		T Gill 0-6, A Mernagh 1-0.

=== Quarter-finals ===
5 November 2000 Quarter-final	Rhode	1-09 - 1-02	Newtown Blues	O'Connor Park
	P Kelleghan 0-6, E Byrne 1-1, K Kelleghan 0-1, F Dunne 0-1.		P Stone 1-0, C Kelly 0-1, T Carr 0-1.

5 November 2000 Quarter-final	O'Hanrahan's	2-09 - 3-06	Coralstown/Kinnegad	Dr. Cullen Park
	P Kavanagh 1-6, S Farrell 1-0, A Kavanagh 0-2, B Hannon 0-1.		A Coyne 1-3, F Dardis 1-1, J McCaffrey 1-1, L Giles 0-1.

5 November 2000 Quarter-final	Abbeylara	1-04 - 1-07	Na Fianna	Pearse Park
	M O'Connor 1-0, N Sheridan 0-1, G Fay 0-1, T Drake 0-1, P Lynch 0-1.		D Mackin 1-1, J Foley 0-4, K Donnelly 0-1, D Lynch 0-1.

11 November 2000 Quarter-final replay	Coralstown/Kinnegad	1-11 - 1-12	O'Hanrahan's	St Loman's Park
	D FLynn 0-8, A Cannon 1-0, A Coyne 0-2, E Fleming 0-1.		G Walker 1-1, M Carpenter 0-4, P Kavanagh 0-3, A Kavanagh 0-2, D Bermingham 0-1, S Farrell 0-1.

12 November 2000 Quarter-final	Dunshaughlin	0-06 - 4-07	Moorefield	Páirc Tailteann
	P McHale 0-3, T Dowd 0-2, G Dowd 0-1.		B McGrogan 2-0, T Behan 1-2, C O'Neill 1-0, P Murray 0-4.

=== Semi-finals ===
19 November 2000 Semi-final	Na Fianna	0-16 - 0-09	Rhode	St Conleth's Park
	D Mackin 0-5, I Foley 0-4, J Sherlock 0-3, S Connell 0-1, K Donnelly 0-1, D Farrell 0-1, A Shearer 0-1.		P Daly 0-5, A McNamee 0-1, P Kenny 0-1, P Kellaghan 0-1, D Bannon 0-1.

19 November 2000 Semi-final	O'Hanrahan's	0-12 - 0-11	Moorefield	O'Moore Park
	P Kavanagh 0-4, B Walker 0-3, D Birmingham 0-2, P Nolan 0-1, A Kavanagh 0-1, D Farrell 0-1.		P Murray 0-5, R Sweeney 0-2, K Duanne 0-1, P Behan 0-1, P McGrogan 0-1, M Murray 0-1.

=== Final ===
3 December 2000 Final	O'Hanrahan's	1-07 - 1-05	Na Fianna	O'Moore Park
	B Walker 1-1, P Kavanagh 0-4, D Bermingham 0-2.		A Shearer 1-0, M Galvin 0-2, K Donnelly 0-1, S Connell 0-1, I Foley 0-1.	Referee: John Bannon (Longford)

== Munster ==
=== Quarter-finals ===
22 October 2000 Quarter-final	Moyle Rovers	2-02 - 0-07	The Nire	Ardfinnan
	N Fitzgerald 1-0, Derry Foley 1-0, J Owens 0-1, D Browne 0-1.		C Power 0-5, M Walsh 0-1, P Walsh 0-1.

28 October 2000 Quarter-final	Éire Óg, Ennis	1-05 - 0-07	Fr Casey's, Abbeyfeale	Cusack Park
	M Kelly 1-0, B McMahon 0-2, B Fitzgerald 0-1, C Egan 0-1, B Keating 0-1.		T Fitzgerald 0-5, A Enright 0-2.

=== Semi-finals ===
20 November 2000 Semi-final	Moyle Rovers	0-08 - 1-09	Glenflesk	Ardfinnan
	D Browne 0-5, J Owens 0-2, J Shanahan 0-1.		J Crowley 1-2, S Dennehy 0-2, O Favier 0-1, S Moynihan 0-1, Paud O'Donoghue 0-1, D O'Donoghue 0-1, E O'Donoghue 0-1.

19 November 2000 Semi-final	Éire Óg, Ennis	0-05 - 2-10	Nemo Rangers	Cusack Park
	B McMahon 0-3, N Hogan 0-1, P Cosgrove 0-1.		S O'Brien 1-0, J Kavanagh 0-3, D Niblock 0-2, N Corkery 0-2, A Cronin 0-1, D Kavanagh 0-1, W Morgan 0-1.

=== Final ===
3 December 2000 Final	Nemo Rangers	0-11 - 0-07	Glenflesk	Gaelic Grounds
	C Corkery 0-6 (4f), M Cronin 0-2, D Niblock, K Cahill, L O'Sullivan 0-1 each.	Report	Paud O'Donoghue 0-4 (4f), J Crowley 0-3.	Referee: Paddy Russell (Tipperary)

== Ulster ==
=== Preliminary round ===
1 October 2000 Preliminary round	Crossmaglen Rangers	0-09 - 1-04	Enniskillen Gaels	Oliver Plunkett Park
	O McConville 0-5, J Fitzpatrick 0-2, C Short 0-1, J McConville 0-1.		G Clarke 1-0, Brewster 0-2, O McShea 0-1, R McCabe 0-1.

=== Quarter-finals ===
1 October 2000 Quarter-final	Clonduff	0-10 - 1-08	Errigal Ciarán	Páirc Esler
	R Carr 0-4, S Ward 0-2, E O'Hagan 0-1, P McConville 0-1, J Morgan 0-1, J Farrell 0-1.		M Harte 1-0, Peter Canavan 0-3, E Gormley 0-3, E Kavanagh 0-1, D O'Hanlon 0-1.

1 October 2000 Quarter-final	Ard an Rátha	1-07 - 2-13	Gowna	MacCumhaill Park
	S Gildea 1-0, M Doherty 0-2, D Diver 0-1, C O'Doherty 0-1, F Heena 0-1, J Boyle 0-1, D Earley 0-1.		D Bardy 1-4, D McCabe 0-4, S Pearson 1-0, G Pearson 0-3, M McKeever 0-1, B Morris 0-1.

1 October 2000 Quarter-final	Bellaghy	w/o - scr.	Antrim champion

16 October 2000 Quarter-final	Castleblayney	0-15 - 0-05	Crossmaglen Rangers	St Mary's Park
	K Tavey 0-6, P O'Connor 0-4, A Tavey 0-2, D McArdle 0-1, P Duffy 0-1, P McDonald 0-1.		O McConville 0-2, J McConville 0-2, T McEntee 0-1.

=== Semi-finals ===
22 October 2000 Semi-final	Bellaghy	0-09 - 0-06	Gowna	St Tiernach's Park
	G Diamond 0-5, L McPeake 0-2, K Diamond 0-1, C McNally 0-1.		D McCabe 0-4, G Pearson 0-2.

22 October 2000 Semi-final	Castleblayney	1-09 - 2-10	Errigal Ciarán	St Tiernach's Park
	K Tavey 1-6, D Loughman 0-1, P Duffy 0-1, D Duffy 0-1.		A O'Donnell 1-1, E Kavanagh 1-1, E Gormley 0-3, Peter Canavan 0-3, E McCaffrey 0-1, E McGinley 0-1.

=== Final ===
5 November 2000 Final	Bellaghy	1-10 - 1-04	Errigal Ciarán	St Tiernach's Park
	G Diamond 0-5, C Scullion 1-1, J Cassidy 0-2, L Diamond 0-1, F Glackin 0-1.		M Harte 1-0, E Gormley 0-2, P Loughran 0-1, Peter Canavan 0-1.

== Quarter-final ==
10 December 2000 Quarter-final	Tír Chonaill Gaels	0-06 - 2-08	Nemo Rangers	Emerald GAA Grounds
	T Maguire 0-3, D Gillespie 0-2, B McDonagh 0-1.		J Kavanagh 1-1, A Cronin 1-1, D Niblock 0-2, N Corkery 0-2, M Cronin 0-1, JP O'Neill 0-1.

== Semi-finals ==
18 February 2001 Semi-final	Nemo Rangers	0-12 - 1-07	O'Hanrahan's	Ned Hall Park
	C Corkery 0-7, D Niblock 0-2; J Kavanagh 0-2, A Cronin 0-1.		A Kavanagh 1-1, P Kavanagh 0-3, D Bermingham 0-1, B Walker 0-1, G Walker 0-1.

18 February 2001 Semi-final	Crossmolina Deel Rovers	1-08 - 0-07	Bellaghy	Brewster Park
	P McAndrew 1-0, K McDonald 0-2, J Keane 0-1, P Gardiner 0-1, J Leonard 0-1, L Moffatt 0-1, J Nallen 0-1, M Moyles 0-1.		G Diamond 0-6, F Glacken 0-1.

== Final ==
17 March 2001 Final	Crossmolina Deel Rovers	0-16 - 1-12	Nemo Rangers	Croke Park
	K McDonald 0-7 (0-3f), J Keane 0-2. P McGuinness 0-2, P Gardiner, P McAndrew, M Moyles, L Moffatt, J Leonard 0-1 each.		C Corkery 1-6 (0-3f, 0-1 '45'), D Kavanagh, K Cahill, S O'Brien, D Niblock, A Cronin, J Kavanagh 0-1 each.	Referee: John Bannon (Longford)

== Finalists ==
Crossmolina Deel Rovers – 2001 All-Ireland Senior Club Football Champions (1st title)

Tommy Jordan managed the winning team.

1. Barry Heffernan
2. Stephen Rochford
3. Tom Nallen (c)
4. Colm Reilly
5. Peadár Gardiner
6. Damien Mulligan
7. Patrick McAndrew
8. James Nallen
9. Michael Moyles
10. Joe Keane
11. Ciarán McDonald
12. Enda Lavelle
13. Paul McGuinness
14. Liam Moffatt
15. Johnny Leonard

Subs used

17 Gerard O'Malley for J. Leonard
21 Thomas Loftus for J. Keane

Nemo Rangers – 2001 All-Ireland Senior Club Football runners-up

Billy Morgan managed the losing team.

1. Don Heaphy
2. Larry Kavanagh
3. Niall Geary
4. Ivan Gibbons
5. Kieran Connolly
6. Steven O'Brien
7. Martin Cronin
8. Derek Kavanagh
9. Kevin Cahill
10. Seán O'Brien
11. Liam O'Sullivan
12. David Niblock
13. Joe Kavanagh
14. Colin Corkery
15. Alan Cronin

Subs used

John Paul O'Neill for D. Niblock
Maurice McCarthy for K. Cahill
Alan Morgan for L. O'Sullivan

== Statistics ==
=== Top scorers ===
Overall

Rank	Player	Club	Tally	Total	Matches	Average
1	Pa Kavanagh	O'Hanrahan's	1–24	27	6	4.50
2	Ciarán McDonald	Crossmolina Deel Rovers	2–17	23	4	5.75
2	Tommy Gill	Rathnew	0–23	23	3	7.66
3	Colin Corkery	Nemo Rangers	1–19	22	3	7.33
4	Gavin Diamond	Bellaghy	0–16	16	3	5.33
5	Kieran Tavey	Castleblayney	1–12	15	2	7.50

In a single game

Rank	Player	Club	Tally	Total	Opposition
1	Tommy Gill	Rathnew	0–10	10	Dunshaughlin
2	Ciarán McDonald	Crossmolina Deel Rovers	1–6	9	Kilbride
2	Pa Kavanagh	O'Hanrahan's	1–6	9	Coralstown/Kinnegad
2	Kieran Tavey	Castleblayney	1–6	9	Errigal Ciarán
2	Colin Corkery	Nemo Rangers	1–6	9	Crossmolina Deel Rovers
3	David Flynn	Coralstown/Kinnegad	0–8	8	O'Hanrahan's
4	Alan O'Donovan	Corofin	1–4	7	Aughavas
4	Dessie Brady	Gowna	1–4	7	Ard an Rátha
4	Tommy Gill	Rathnew	0–7	7	Dunshaughlin
4	Colin Corkery	Nemo Rangers	0–7	7	O'Hanrahan's
4	Ciarán McDonald	Crossmolina Deel Rovers	0–7	7	Nemo Rangers

=== Miscellaneous ===
- O'Hanrahan's won the Leinster Club SFC for the first time.
