= Nallen =

Nallen is a surname. Notable people with the surname include:

- Chris Nallen (born 1982), American golfer
- James Nallen (born 1973), Irish Gaelic footballer
- John Nallen (1932–2019), Irish Gaelic footballer

== See also ==
- Allen (surname)
