= Perkins Crofton =

Irish Anglican priest

Perkins Crofton (1705-1768) was an Anglican priest in Ireland in the 18th century.

Crofton was born in Crossmolina and educated at Trinity College, Dublin. He was a Royal Navy Chaplain, he was Archdeacon of Aghadoe from 1728 to 1736.
