= Crossmolina =

Town in County Mayo, Ireland

Crossmolina Crois Mhaoilíona
- Town
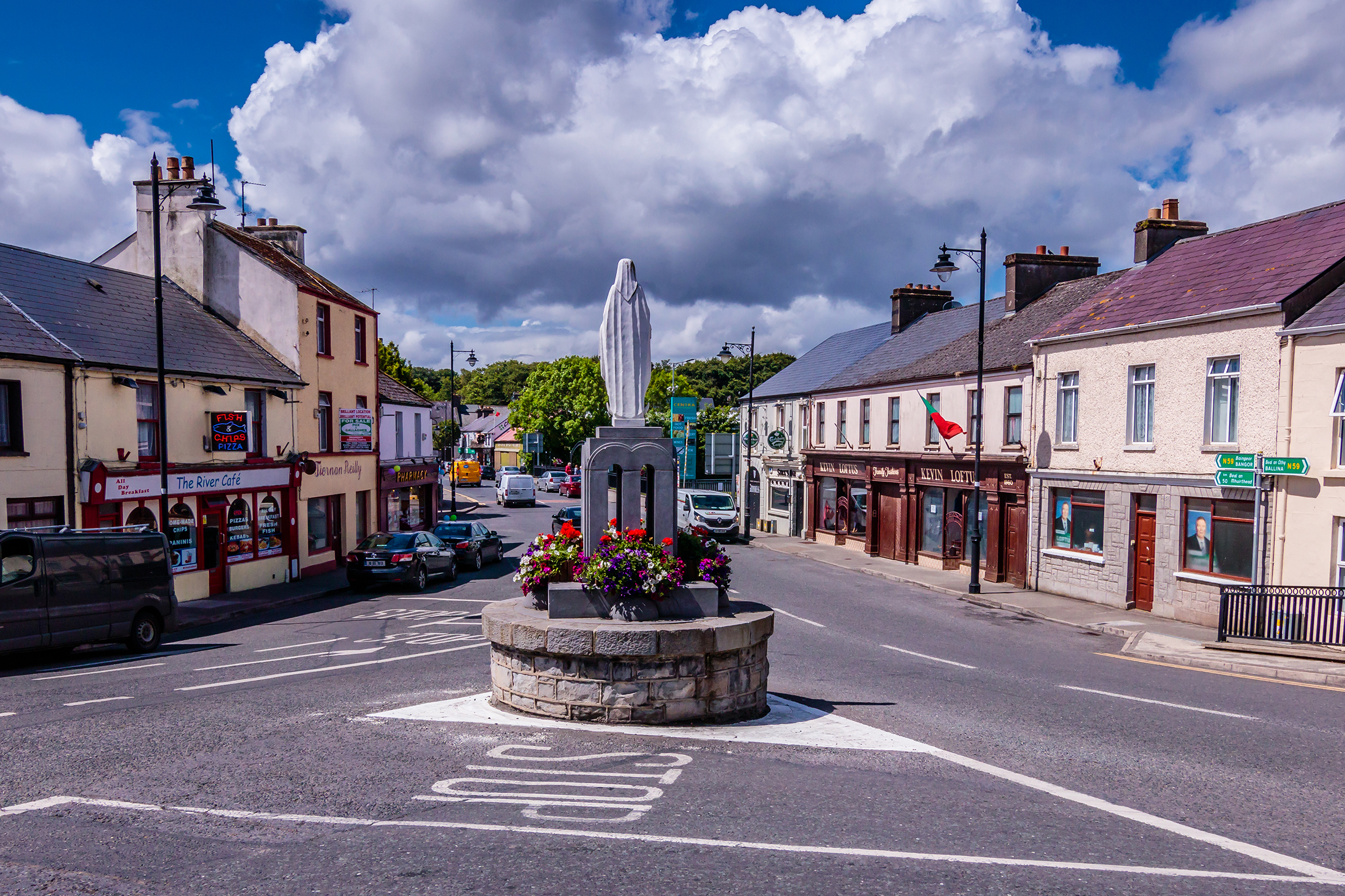
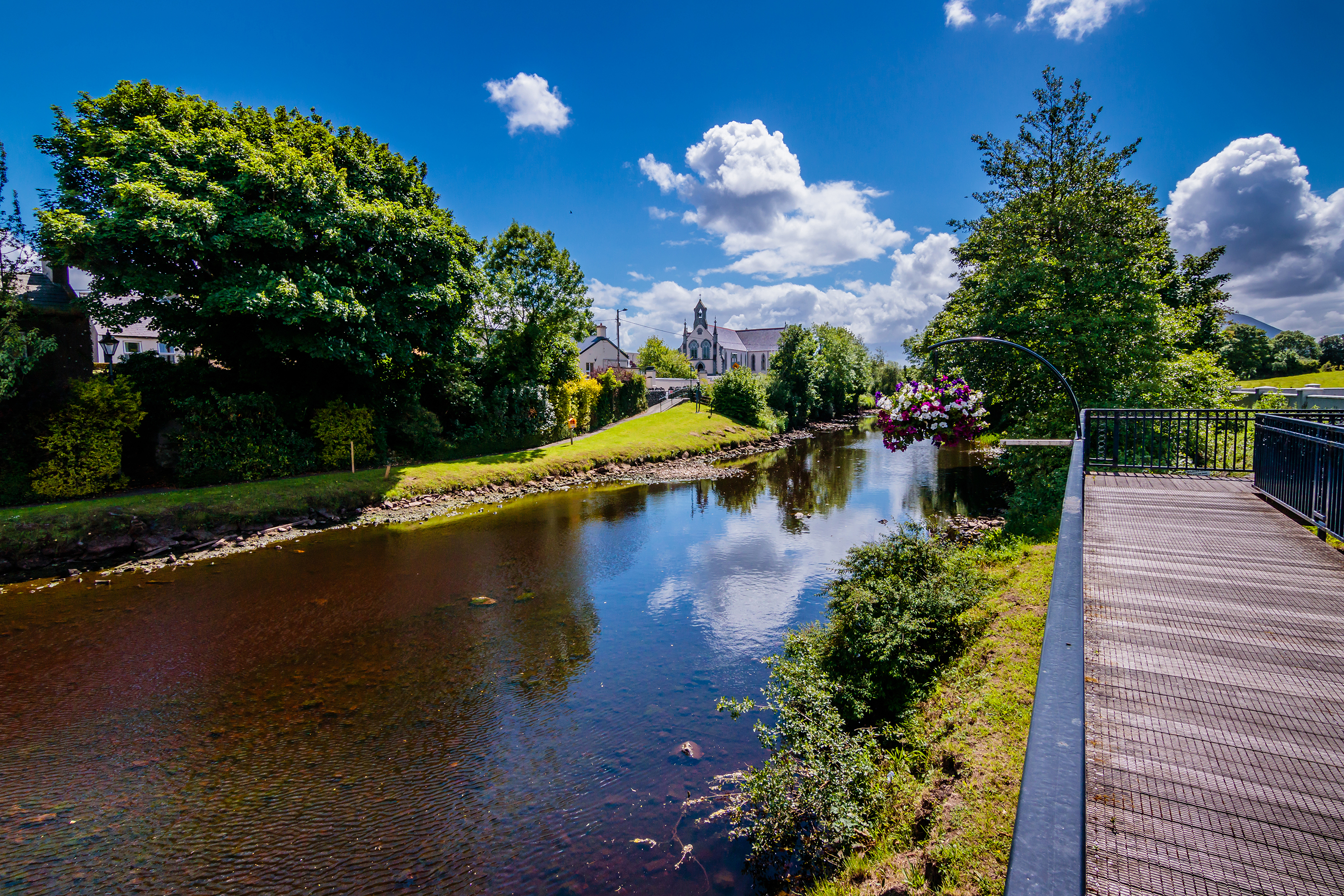
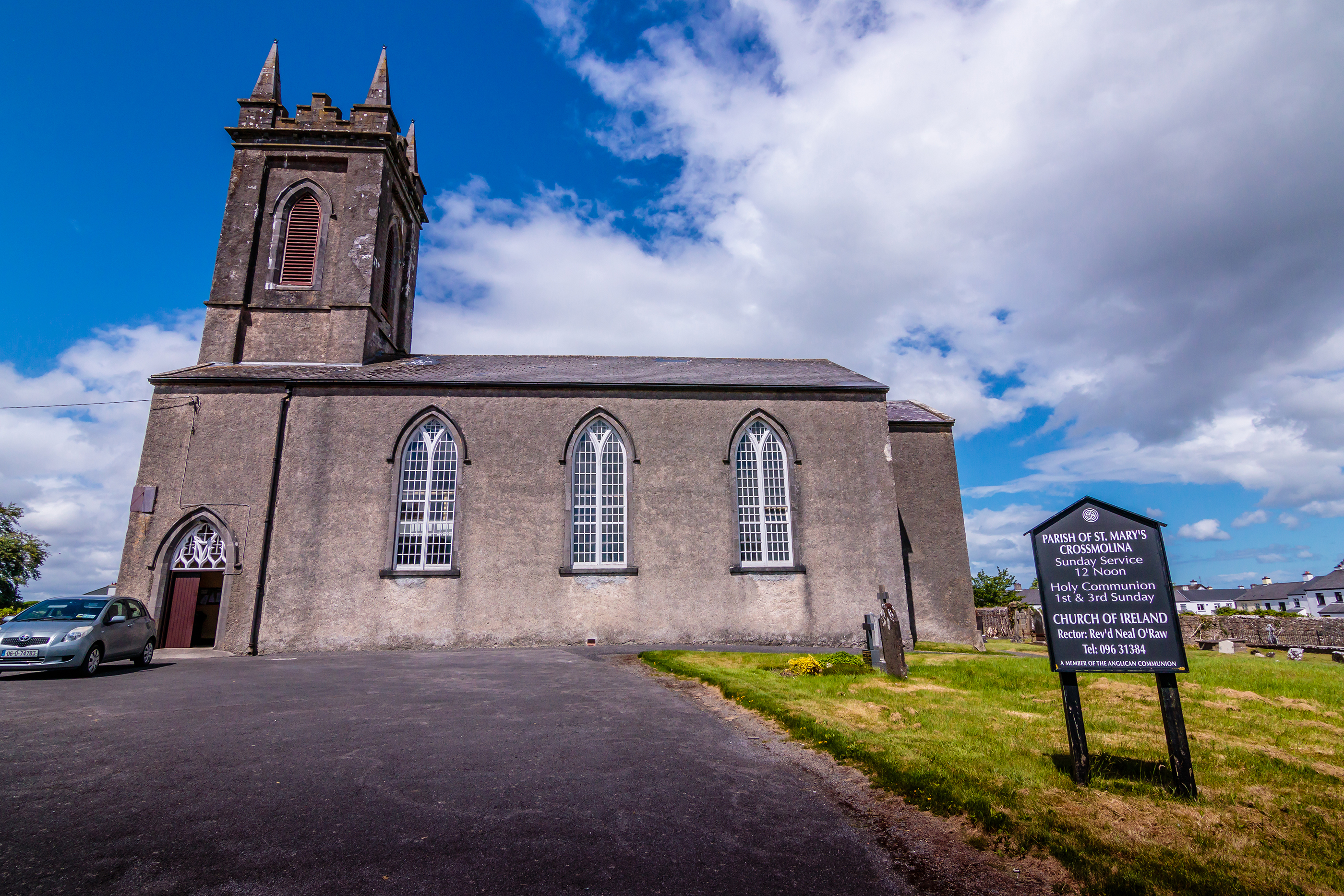
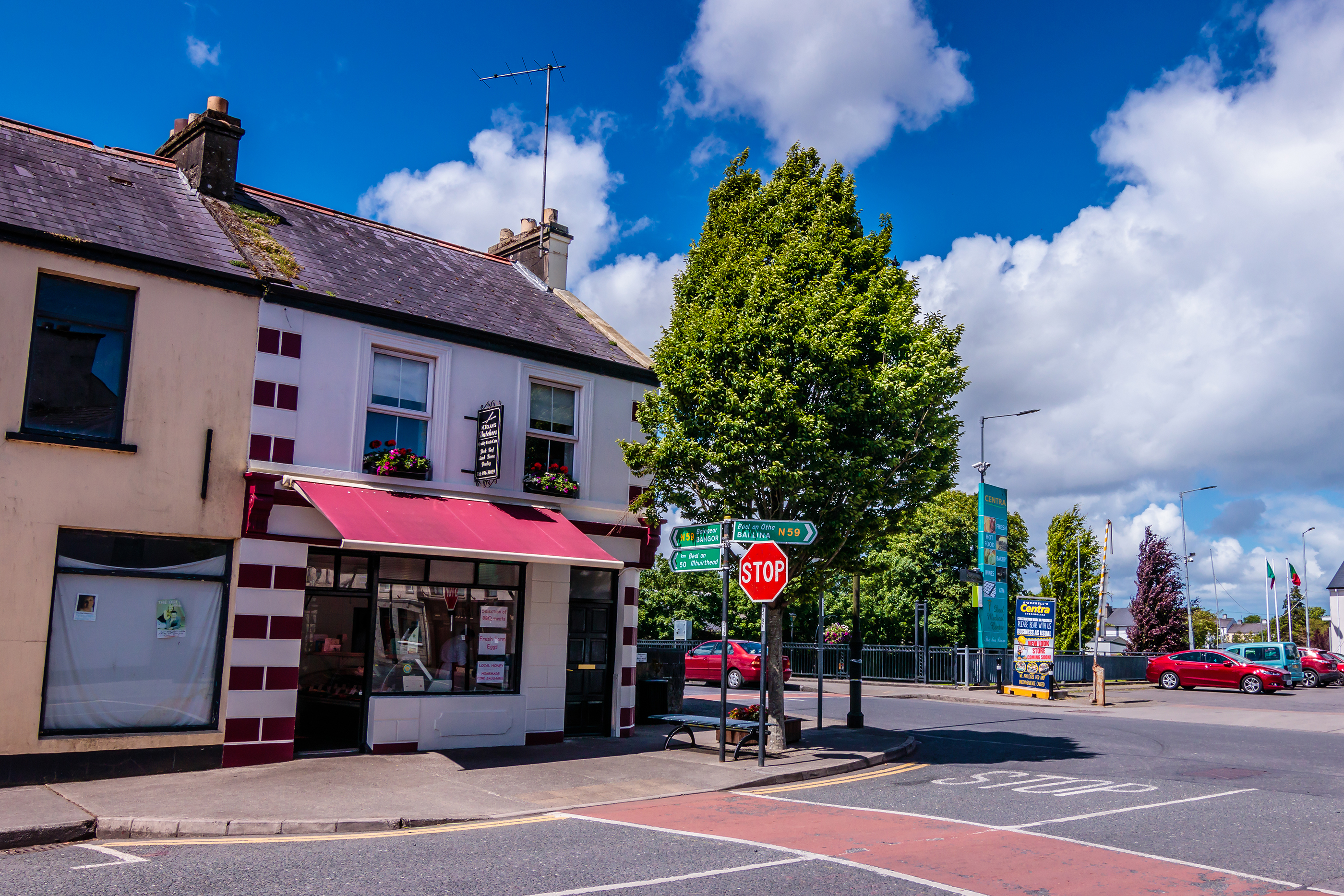
- Montage including; Top: A view of the statue at the centre of the town of Crossmolina. Centre: Deel River and Saint Mary's Church. Bottom: Street view in centre of the town

- Location in Ireland
- Coordinates: 54°06′00″N 9°19′00″W
- Country: Ireland
- Province: Connacht
- County: County Mayo
- Elevation: 24 m (79 ft)

Population (2016)
  - Total: 1,044
- Irish Grid Reference: G137175
- Website: crossmolina.ie

Crossmolina (Irish: Crois Mhaoilíona) is a town in the historical barony of Tyrawley in County Mayo, Ireland, as well as the name of the civil parish and Catholic parish in which the town is situated. The town sits on the River Deel near the northern shore of Lough Conn. Crossmolina is about 9 km (5.6 mi) west of Ballina on the N59 road and 7.7 km (4.8 mi) north of Lahardane village. Surrounding the town, there are a number of agriculturally important townlands, including Enaghbeg, Rathmore, and Tooreen.

== Etymology ==
The name Crossmolina is from the Irish: Crois Uí Mhaoilíona, meaning "Cross of Mullany", or "Maoilíona's cross". In the 18th century, the name was sometimes spelt as either Crossmalina, Crossmaliney, Crosmolyna or Crossmaling.

== History ==
Crossmolina lies within the historic territory of Tír Amhlaidh (Tirawley), which for many centuries formed part of the Gaelic lordship of the Ó Dubhda (O’Dowda) dynasty. The O’Maoilfhiona (O’Molina), O’Gaibhtheachain (O’Gaughan), and O’Flynn families were the local chiefs of the district of Calraighe Magh Eileog, the plain through which the River Deel flows. These families held the area as subordinate lords within the broader lordship of the Ó Dubhda (O’Dowd) dynasty, the dominant Gaelic power in north Mayo.

The O’Dowds were the leading sept of the Uí Fiachrach Muaidhe, a branch of the ancient Connacht ruling lineage of the Uí Fiachrach. Their authority over the territory of Tír Amhlaidh (Tirawley) is documented in medieval Irish annals from at least the twelfth century. The O'Dowd control of Tirawley was periodically contested — most notably by the Anglo-Norman Barrett family following the Battle of Kilroe in the thirteenth century. The family continued to assert lordship over the area until the Tudor conquest of Connacht in the late sixteenth century.

The origins of present-day Crossmolina are tied to the founding of a religious settlement in the area: Errew Abbey was founded by St. Tiernan in the 6th century. In the 12th century this Abbey came into possession of the invading Hiberno-Norman de Barry.

During the 15th century, Crossmolina passed into the hands of the Bourke Family. In 1526 O'Donnell of Tir Conaill (County Donegal) invaded Tirawley and destroyed Crossmolina Castle. In response, the Bourkes constructed a replacement in Deel Castle. Their possession of this new fortress did not last however as during the Williamite War in Ireland of the 1690s Thomas Burke fought for the defeated Catholic

=== Tudor period ===
During the Tudor reconquest of Ireland in the later sixteenth century, English officials attempted to document and reorganize the lands of north Mayo through surveys connected with the Composition of Connacht. These surveys, conducted by Sir John Perrot, sought to identify local rulers, measure territories, and convert the traditional Gaelic system of landholding into land controlled by the Crown.

In the areas around Crossmolina, the surveys found that the region largely lay under the lordship of the O’Dowd dynasty. The records suggest a predominantly pastoral economy based on cattle grazing, supplemented by limited grain cultivation on the better soils along the Deel valley and by fishing in the nearby lakes and rivers. These Tudor surveys provide one of the earliest administrative descriptions of the Crossmolina area and mark the beginning of the gradual transformation of its traditional clan-based economy into a system of legally defined estates under English authority.

=== Anglo-Protestant Ascendency ===
Deel Castle was granted by the English crown to the Anglo-Irish Protestant Gore family. In the 17th century, Francis Jackson, who had fought with Cromwell in Ireland, also received land in North Mayo. The Jackson family later built Enniscoe House. Again, the land taken over by the Jacksons was previously owned by the Burke family. The arrival of these landlords ushered in the era of Protestant Ascendancy into the area.

In 1798 Crossmolina was swept up with the events of the United Irishmen Rebellion when French Forces under General Humbert came from Ballina, passed by Crossmolina, towards Lahardane and on towards Castlebar as they went west of Lough Conn to fight the Battle of Castlebar.

In the late 18th century, the town emerged as a commercial and administrative hub. During this period, local landlords formed the Crossmolina Volunteers militia. By the early 1800s, a granary and bonded warehouses had been established. Petty Court sessions began weekly in 1823, and by the 1830s, the Revenue Police and Constabulary were stationed there. Regular fairs occurred in May, September, and December. The 1831 census showed a town population of 1,481 across 296 households, while the rural parish totaled 10,198. Approximately half the town's households were engaged in trade, manufacturing, and handicrafts.

The town is referenced in the Leigh's pocket road book of Ireland, published in 1827, as a "village in Mayo", whose "most remarkable object is the ruin of an Abbey dedicated to the Virgin Mary". Crossmolina was also mentioned in Samuel Lewis' Topographical Dictionary of Ireland (1837). The town contained "one good street and two converging ones".

=== 19th century ===
==== Poitin production ====
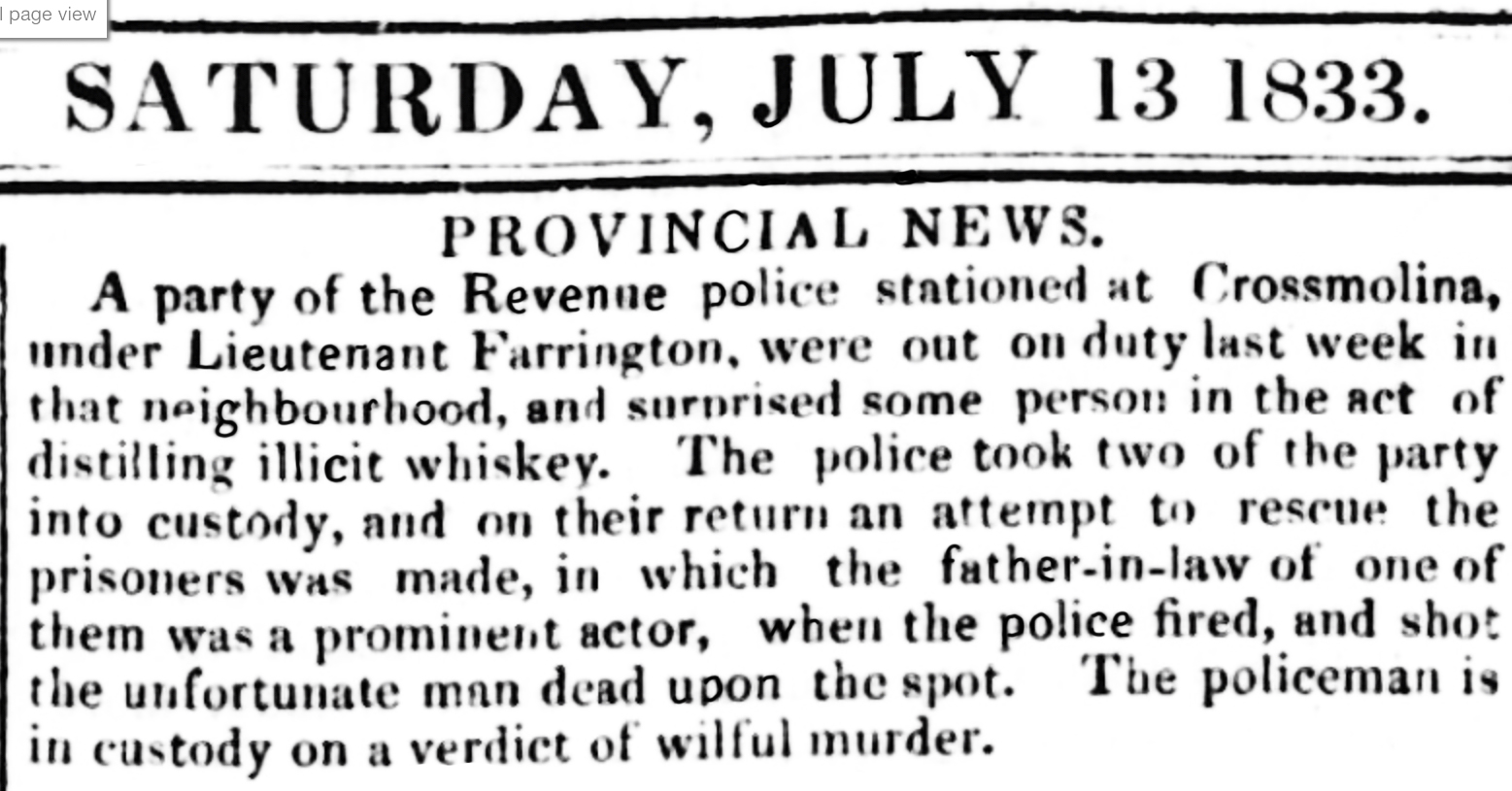
Revenue Police raid, 1833. Warder and Dublin Weekly Mail

Poitín, a traditional Irish spirit made from fermented grain or potatoes, has a high alcohol content. Produced in Ireland for centuries, it significantly impacted Crossmolina's local economy. In the early 19th century, Ireland's government worried about prevalent illegal private distillation, leading to frequent conflicts with locals. By February 1816, North Mayo's poitín production alarmed the government enough to station troops in the town to curb the trade.

In July 1833, a party of Revenue Police, based in Crossmolina, made a routine patrol and made an unexpected discovery—individuals engaged in the illicit distillation of poitín. The police apprehended two members of the group. However, as they returned with the prisoners, a daring attempt to rescue them was made, with a prominent role played by one of the prisoners' father-in-law. Tragically, the situation escalated, leading the police to discharge their weapons, resulting in the death of one man.

==== Rural unrest in the 19th century ====
Land issues in North Mayo were a constant source of tension during the 19th century. Large landowners, often residing in England, rented land to tenant farmers with precarious tenure, risking eviction at any time. This situation led to significant resistance, occasionally violent, when rents were adjusted. Surrounding Crossmolina, endemic poverty prevailed. The 1838 "Royal Commission into the Condition of the Poorer Classes in Ireland" visited the town, and its report highlighted the dire living conditions of the rural poor. Their diet consisted almost entirely of potatoes, with meat consumed rarely, once or twice a year. Laborers earned 6 to 8 pennies daily, partially paid in food.

During the first decade of the 19th century, local peasants formed a secret society called "The Threshers". The group was responsible for a number of "outrages" including destroying crops and breaking into houses. In 1806 a local man – Thady Lavin – had informed the local magistrate of the activities of the group. He was later found murdered near Crossmolina. Six local men - Coll Flynn, Laurence Flynn, Charles Flynn, Thomas Horan, Daniel Regan, and Daniel Callaghan - were convicted of his murder, and hanged in Castlebar in December 1806.

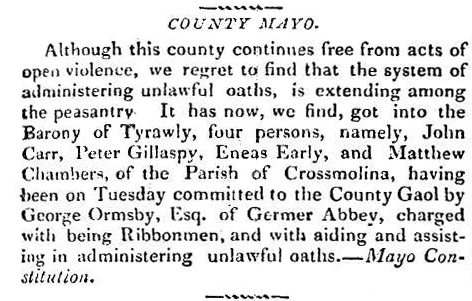
The arrest of Ribbon men in Crossmolina

In December 1813, violence again broke out when a crowd of local residents, armed with pikes and guns, tried to take back cattle that had been sequestered to pay for outstanding rent arrears.

Between 1820 and 1840, the "Ribbonmen" agrarian movement was active in Crossmolina. In December 1821, John Carr, Peter Gillaspy, Eneas Early, and Mathew Chambers were imprisoned for their Ribbonmen membership and for administering illegal oaths. Local magistrate George Ormsby, Esq. of Gortner Abbey, facilitated their imprisonment. Due to significant rural unrest, a yeomanry detachment of three officers and 85 men was stationed permanently in the town starting in 1820.

In February 1839, the Crossmolina Parish Priest - Fr John Barrett - was murdered at Enniscoe Gate, about a mile and a half from Crossmolina. He was attacked late at night while returning from the town to his residence. It was widely speculated at the time that he was murdered because he denounced at the pulpit the activities of a secret society called the "Steel Boys". In 1842, a local Crossmolina Man - John Walsh - was convicted of being a member of the Ribbonmen and transported for seven years. He was found to be in possession of secret passwords and documents relating to the secret society.

Rural violence and political unrest continued through to the second half of the 19th century and even into the early 20th century. In March 1881, the Crossmolina home of the high constable of Tryrawley was attacked by a group of armed men. In November 1882, the local Parish Priest was arrested for permitting a Land League meeting in the Crossmolina Chapel. In June 1882, a Crossmolina farmer called Michael Brown was shot and severely wounded. He had taken over a farm that had been boycotted by local residents. Violence broke out in 1911 when a local man, Patrick Broderick who along with his neighbours, resisted the efforts of over fifty R.I.C. Officers to evict Broderick from his Crossmolina home. Resistance to the eviction was organized by the Crossmolina tenants league.

==== The Big Wind ====
The town was badly damaged during the "Night of the Big Wind" (Irish: Oíche na Gaoithe Móire) that swept across Ireland on 6 January 1839. Almost every house in the town was damaged with four houses destroyed completely. Eight residents were killed.

==== Mystery of the drowned woman ====
In June 1843, the body of a young woman was discovered drowned in the river near Crossmolina. An apron was found tied around her feet, and her knees were bound together with a shirt. A piece of ribbon was tied on one of her arms in a manner that suggested both arms had been bound, and she had managed to free one before she died. The deceased appeared to have been a young woman of considerable beauty. The woman was never identified.

==== Potato crop failures ====
In the early 19th century, frequent potato crop failures led to localised famines. In June 1822, North Mayo experienced a widespread failure. The Archbishop of Tuam visited and reported to the London Times seeing “half-starved men, women, and children” in Crossmolina and surrounding areas. Local landlords and clergy formed an inter-denominational relief committee. Richard Sharpe, agent for the Palmer estate with extensive land in Crossmolina, spearheaded relief efforts by organizing oat shipments to combat starvation.

In early 1831, a potato crop failure led to starvation. Sharpe organized a fundraiser among landlords to buy oats for the starving tenants. In June 1831, Crossmolina experienced a Typhus outbreak, a disease recurring in North Mayo until the 1920s. Dr. James McNair reported over 100 Typhus cases to the Connaught Telegraph, with 38 in Crossmolina. The following June, Rev. Edwin Stock surveyed the area, finding over 3,000 families, totaling 17,000 individuals, suffering from food shortages. George Vaughn Jackson, a local landlord and relief committee secretary, described the dire situation in the London Times, mentioning starving mothers, men seeking work, and rampant fever, indicating widespread starvation and disease.

The crop failures of 1822 and 1832 were precursors to the disastrous famine of the 1840s. By the 1840s, the countryside around Crossmolina was already plagued by destitution, leaving many in dire circumstances. The impoverished population heavily relied on the potato as their main food source. However, in August 1845, disaster struck when a devastating fungus, later identified as Phytophthora infestans, began decimating the potato crops. The once-green stalks of potato ridges quickly succumbed to blight, resulting in a putrid stench emanating from the rotting crops. The Famine devastated the rural areas surrounding Crossmolina, slicing the population from 12,221 in 1841 to 7,236 by 1851. It also had drastic effects on the use of language in the area: It is estimated that over 80% of the Crossmolina area spoke the Irish Language prior to the famine.

By early 1847, the Great Famine's devastating impact in Crossmolina was widely reported in England. Reverend St. George Knox, a local Protestant clergyman, detailed the town's distress in a letter to the London Evening Standard. He noted rising provisions prices, the poor congregating for relief, and sixteen deaths in one month, with about 900 parishioners unable to buy food. Despite these conditions, Knox highlighted the population's remarkable patience and peacefulness, emphasizing "no depredations were committed", despite daily starvation deaths. An article in the London Evening Standard from January 1847 described a dire situation in the town, with inquests held for those who died suddenly, likely from diseases caused by lack of food. It reported that scores were dying daily in North Mayo from malnutrition-related illnesses, with some eating raw vegetables in desperate attempts to combat hunger.

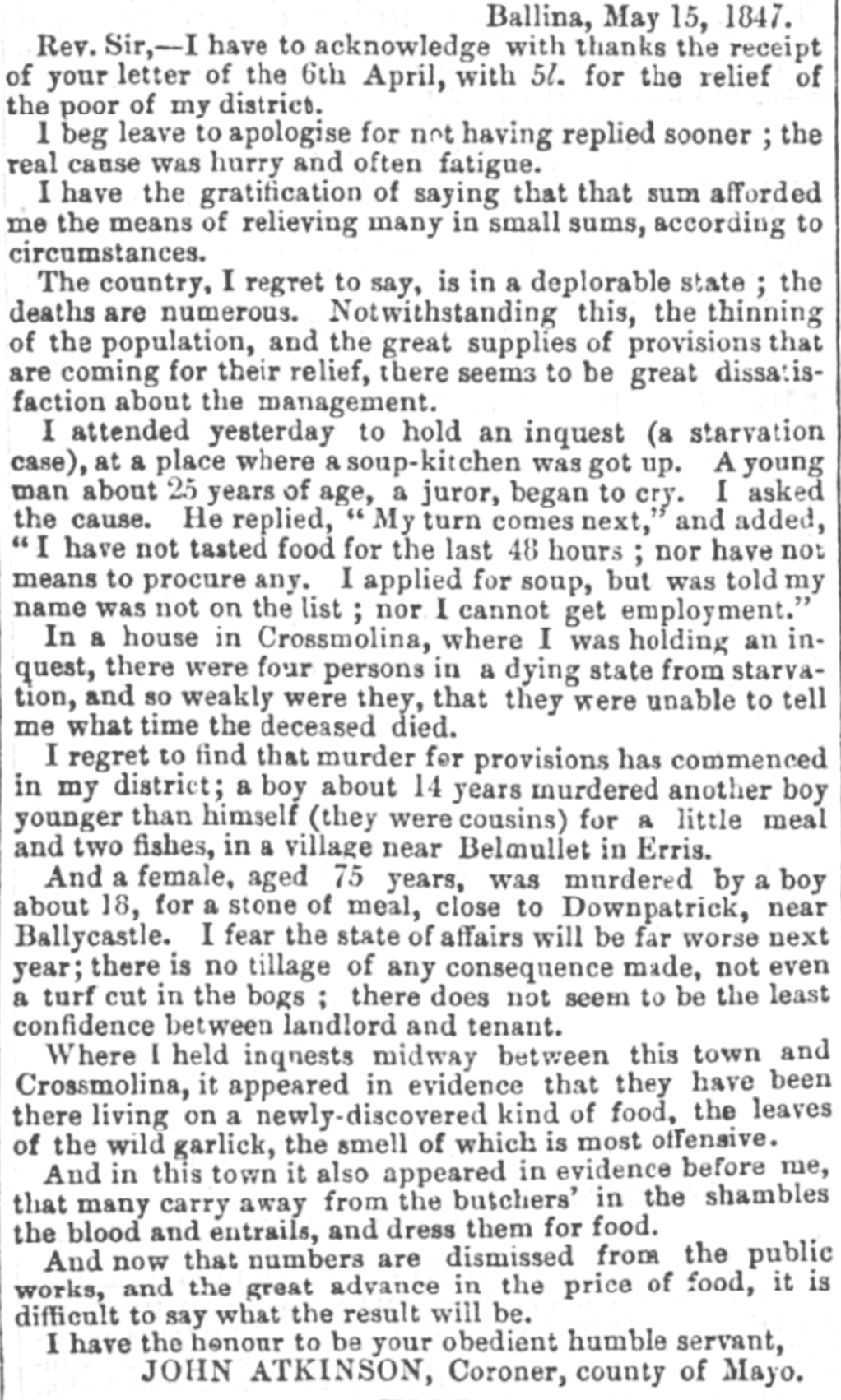
Letter from the Mayo Coroner - Dr Atkinson - to the Morning Herald, describing the situation of the famine in Crossmolina. The letter it was published in May 1847.

Due to the work of the local coroner and doctor (Mr Atkinson and Dr McNair), the names of some of the famine victims were recorded in the local press. The victims often moved from their homes in the countryside to beg in the town.

- At an inquest held in the town in December 1846, local residents Michael Walsh. John Moonelly (Munnelly), Michael McGevir and Anthony Mally were found to have died from starvation.
- James Fleming (aged 60) and Edward Fleming (aged 13) died of hunger in March 1847 in Corrrabeg, near Crossmolina.
- Bernard Rogan died in the town in December 1846. He was part of a family from Limerick, who were denied entrance to the poor house in the city. The family became itinerant, began begging and ended up in Crossmolina where the boy died.
- Michael Moran also died in December 1846. During the last six weeks of his life, he and his family had been forced to beg for food.
- Matthew Temple starved to death in the town in January 1847.
- At an inquest held in February 1847, the deaths of Mary Minn and Patrick Gorman - both residents of Crossmolina - were recorded as deaths due to starvation. The inquest recorded a further 16 deaths of residents in the surrounding villages as due to starvation.
- In March 1847, the body of Bridget McDermott was found dead in the town. The coroner recorded a verdict of death by starvation.

==== Land League ====
Like much of Mayo, the Land League was active in the town and the surrounding area, and several local members were arrested on account of the activities of the League. In March 1881, two Crossmolina members of the League, whose names were Cawley and Daly, were arrested under the provisions of the Coercion Act. They were escorted to Kilmainham jail under armed guard. In October 1881, the Rev. McHale - Parish Priest of Adergoole was arrested under the same Coercion Act for holding a Land League meeting in the Roman Catholic Chapel. A month later, Peter Doherty, a member of the Crossmolina branch of the league was also arrested.

The activities of the Crossmolina Land League were discussed in the House of Commons during the debate on the Protection of Persons and Property (Ireland) Bill in January 1881. Bradford MP W. E. Forster claimed that armed League members pressured local tenants into refusing rent payments beyond Griffith's Valuation amounts. They also discouraged purchases from a Crossmolina grocer, Hogan, whom Forster described as "a respectable grocer" who declined to join or support the Land League.

==== Crossmolina Conspiracy ====
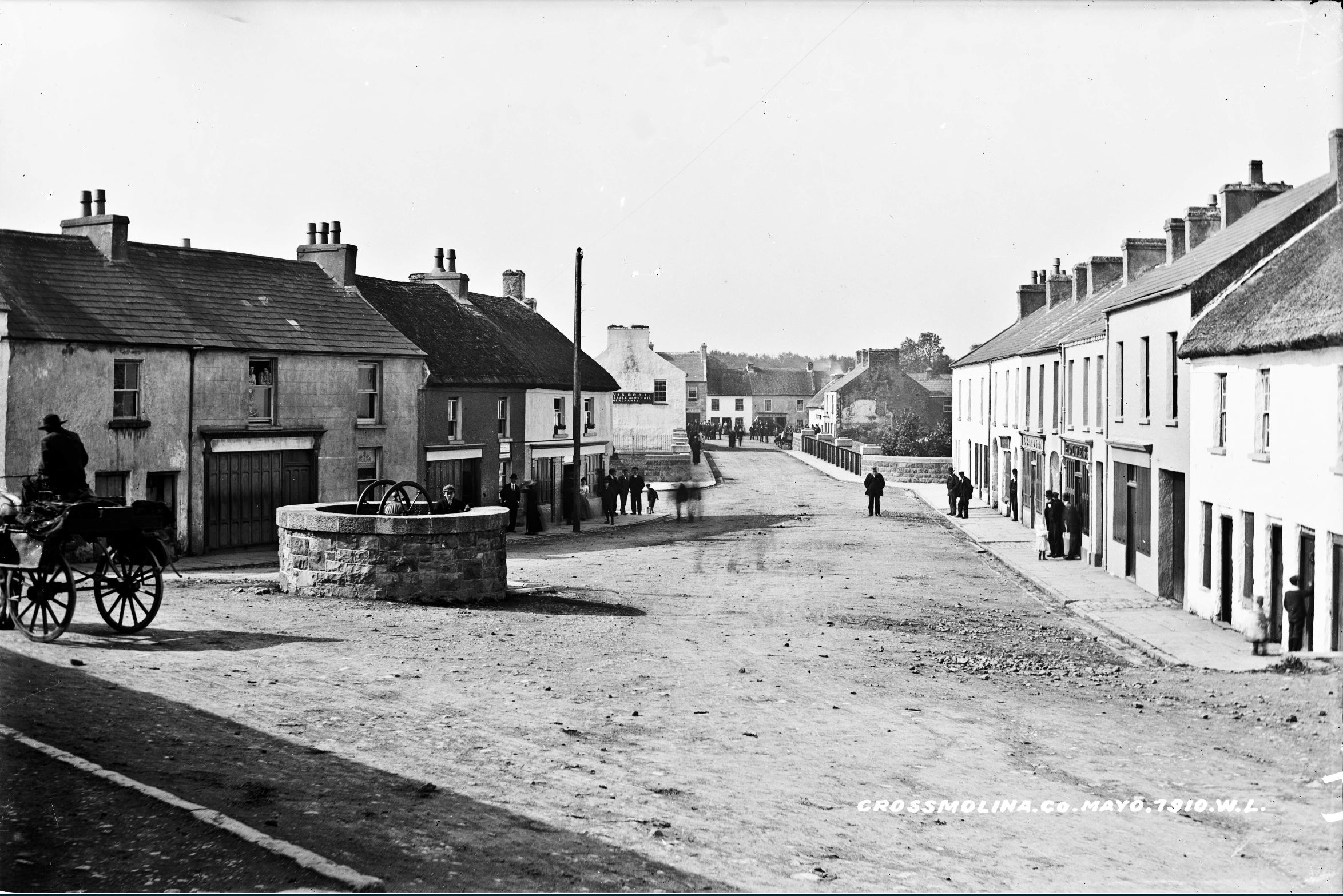
Crossmolina in the late 1800s

In May 1883, a number of local men were arrested in what became known as the "Crossmolina Conspiracy". The arrests included Thomas Daly, Thomas Macaulay, James King, Richard Halloran, Patrick Nunelly, and Patrick Nally. They were charged with conspiracy to murder local landlords and their agents. During the search of the prisoners' houses, the police discovered two rifles, a revolver, and explosives. Patrick Nally - a member of the Supreme Council of the Irish Republican Brotherhood - was later tried, convicted, and sentenced to 10 years in prison. He died of Typhoid in prison in November 1891. One of the stands in Croke Park was named after Patrick Nally.

=== 20th century ===
==== Crossmolina riot ====
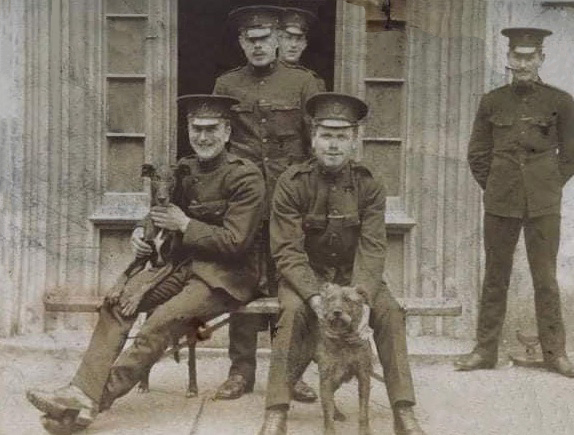
Crossmolina, Royal Irish Constabulary, circa 1912

On Sunday, 28 August 1910, a riot broke out in Crossmolina when the leader of the All for Ireland League (AFIL) - William O'Brien MP - tried to hold an open-air meeting in the town center. The league was a non-sectarian nationalist political party that briefly flourished prior to the first world war. Its main objective was to form a broad coalition between the Unionist and Nationalist populations. The league was opposed by more Catholic nationalist organizations such as the Ancient Order of Hibernians (AOH) and the United Irish League.

O'Brien, anticipating conflict, arrived in town with a large police force and AFIL supporters. Confronted by locals armed with sticks and rocks, he aimed to speak at an open-air meeting on Chapel Street. Police baton-charged to clear a path, allowing O'Brien's attempt to speak. However, the Lahardane Fife and Drum band began to play, and shouting locals prevented him from being heard. Violence ensued, and during the retreat towards Ballina, O'Brien was hit on the head with a stick. A month later, Thomas Moclair was convicted for firing a gun at the event, fined 10s, and ordered to pay court costs. The event received widespread media coverage throughout the United Kingdom.

==== War of Independence ====
The Irish War of Independence was a conflict fought between the Irish Republican Army and British forces: the British Army, the Royal Irish Constabulary. There were a number of sporadic incidents during the war that occurred in Crossmolina and the surrounding areas. A company of Irish Volunteers was established in August 1917. The seven original members of the company were the brothers Martin and Patrick Loftus, Patrick Hegarty, James O’Hara, Ned O’Boyle, Ned Murphy and John Timoney.

In July 1920, Mossbrook House, a large house just outside Crossmolina, was destroyed. Around the same time, four Sinn Féin activists - who were all brothers from the Hegarty family of Castlehill, Crossmolina - were arrested and escorted to Castlebar under a heavy military escort.

An RIC policeman – Constable William Kelly – was tried by court-martial for the attempted murder of a civilian in Crossmolina. On 20 December 1920 Constable Kelly was drunk when he confronted a local man and opened fire with his rifle. When he was arrested, he admitted to firing "at a bloody Sinn Feiner." He was found not guilty of attempted murder, but guilty of shooting with intent to do grievous bodily harm.

In October 1920, John O'Reilly – a resident of Crossmolina – faced a court-martial in Galway. He was accused of possessing a revolver and threatening local R.I.C. officers. He warned the officers to resign from the police force. He also threatened to burn down the local R.I.C. barracks. Subsequently, a number of officers posted to Crossmolina resigned from the force.

In spring 1922, a company of the IRA based in Crossmolina was responsible for attacking and burning the R.I.C. Station in Bellacorick.

In February 1922, the IRA declared "martial law" in Crossmolina. The Irish Transport and General Workers Union organized a strike in Davis Bros after an Apprentice was fired. During the strike, a warehouse owned by Davis was burnt, destroying a large number of eggs awaiting shipment. A large number of cattle were maimed, belonging to a farmer who condemned the attack on Davis Bros. Ten local men were arrested in connection with attacks on property.

==== Irish Civil War ====
In September 1922, Malachy Geraghty (26) was shot and killed in the crossfire between Republicans and the Free State Army. Geraghty, a cattle dealer from Ballygar, was returning from the Crossmolina fair when he accidentally drove into a firefight in Ballina. Shortly afterwards, the National Army arrested "Brig-General" Patrick Hegarty, who was the leader of the Republicans in Crossmolina.

In October 1922, Republicans attacked the National Army Barracks in Crossmolina. After a five-hour gun battle, the Republicans were forced out of the town. In January 1923, the Barracks were again attacked by a sniper. There were no reported casualties but several private houses in the town were pierced by bullets.

On 5 January 1923, Patrick Mahon, a native of Crossmolina, was shot dead by a National Army patrol in Ballina. The patrol heard shouts of "Up Kilroy," and "Up the Bolshies". The soldiers went to investigate and apprehended Mahon, who resisted arrest. On being brought to the barracks a National Army soldier pushed Mahon in the back with his rifle and a shot went off, killing Mahon instantly. An inquest later recorded a verdict of accidental death.

Two irregulars - Nicholas Corcoran and Thomas Gill - were captured by the National Army in March 1923 in Massbrook, near Crossmolina. Corcoran was discovered with a revolver, ammunition, and explosives. A few days later, Jack Leonard was arrested in his home in Crossmolina. Leonard was the photographer who took one of the most iconic images of the War of Independence - "the Men of the West". It is the photo of the West Mayo IRA Flying Column, taken at Derrymartin on the slopes of Nephin mountain, in June 1921. It is widely regarded as the best contemporary photograph of an IRA Active Service Unit ever taken.

==== Second World War ====
On 13 March 1942, a Bristol Blenheim crashed in Killeen, Crossmolina, during a training flight from the Isle of Man. Due to wireless failure, the crew lost bearings and eventually ran low on fuel. Making an emergency landing, they overshot the landing spot, crashing through hedges and boulders. Two crew members sustained serious injuries. The less injured were repatriated to Northern Ireland the next day, while the more seriously injured were transported by ambulance a week later.

On 25 October 1942, an RAF plane from Newfoundland attempted an emergency landing in Pulladoohy, near Crossmolina, but crashed upside down, killing the pilot. The Boston Douglas light bomber, carrying three crew members, mistook a bog for a flat field. The Norwegian pilot, Captain Nils Rasmussen, received military honors at Kilmurray Cemetery. Local Defence Force members and the Irish Army assisted the survivors. Sgt Peter Frank Craske of the Royal Air Force and F/Sgt Frederick Michael Fuller of the Royal Canadian Air Force were sent to Northern Ireland shortly after.

==== Economic development in the 20th century ====
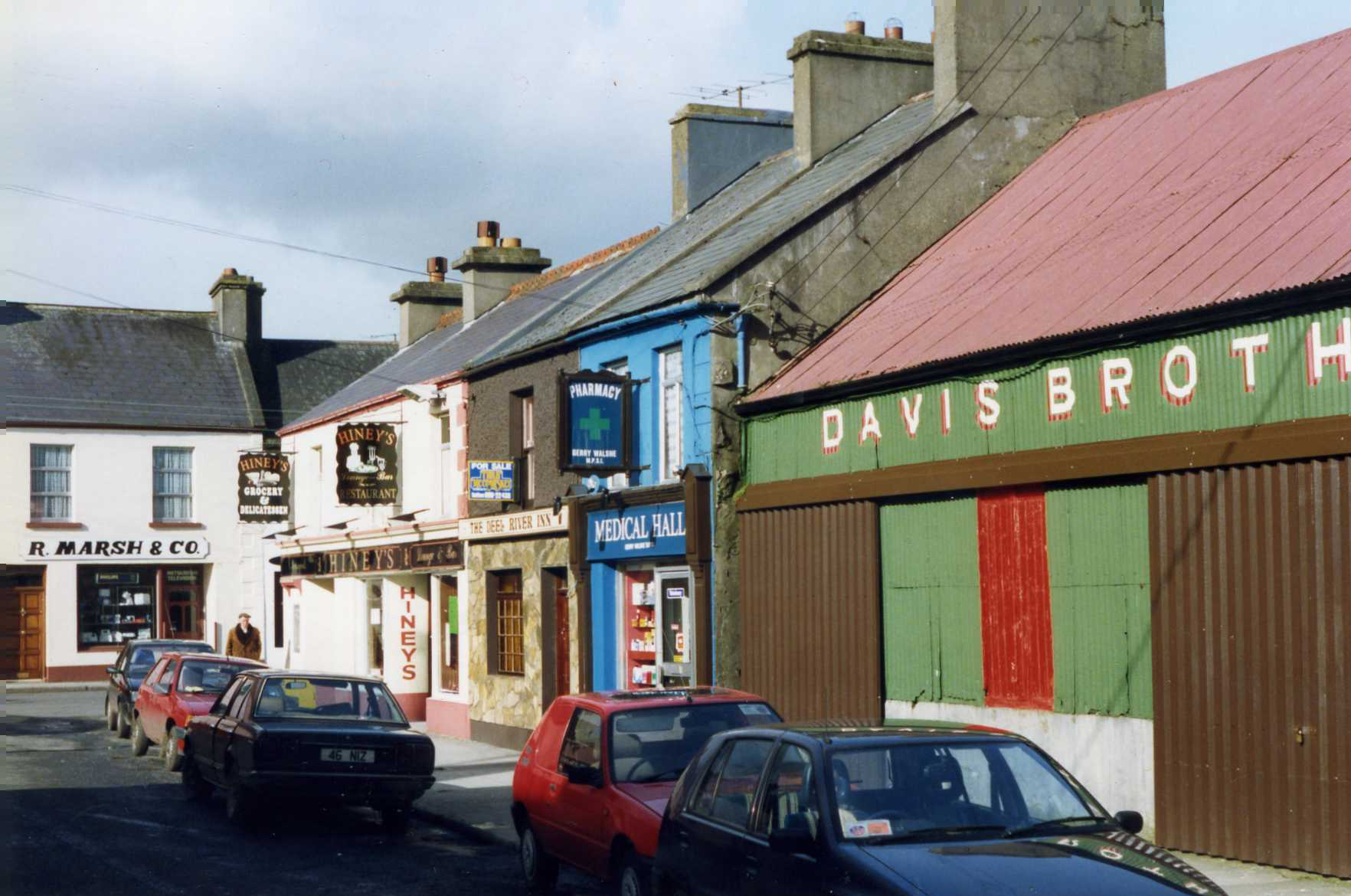
Crossmolina in the 1980s

In the 1960s, the town benefitted from the construction of the Bellacorick electricity station fueled by peat. Twenty-one houses were built in Crossmolina for the station's operating staff.

==== The Feehan trials ====
In the late 1960s, the town received significant media attention when Mary Feehan, a 19-year-old from Crossmolina was acquitted of murder after enduring three separate trials. Feehan had been accused of poisoning Civic Guard Hugh Greene with strychnine at a Crossmolina police station in October 1967. Her first trial in May resulted in a guilty verdict and a life sentence, but the Irish Court of Criminal Appeal ordered a retrial due to judicial misdirection. The second trial in November ended with a hung jury. In her third trial, the jury ultimately returned a “not guilty” verdict, prompting an emotional reaction from Feehan, who collapsed outside Dublin's Central Criminal Court, surrounded by supporters.

=== 21st century ===
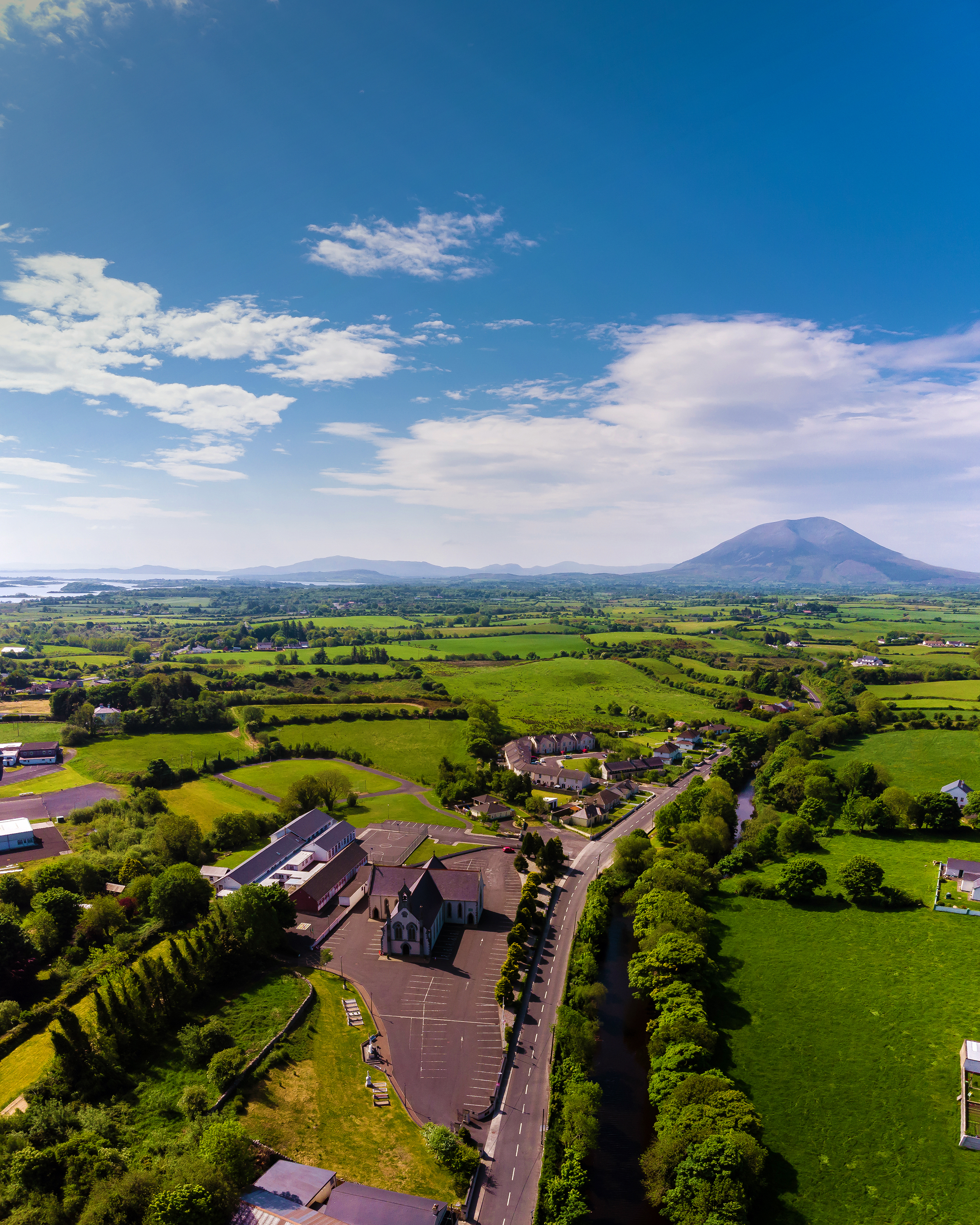
Aerial view of Crossmolina. In the foreground is Saint Tiernan's Church and the mountain Nephin is in the distance.

A new Crossmolina Fire Station, which cost just under €2 million, was officially opened in 2023 by the Minister for Housing, Local Government and Heritage Darragh O’Brien TD. This state-of-the-art facility was the first new station constructed in County Mayo in 19 years. It included a modern two-storey building and a four-storey tower for training purposes.

Many homes in the area have been impacted of the Irish Defective Blocks Crisis. From 2011 onwards, local builders used blocks that contained excessive amounts of pyrite or mica. Over time, these minerals reacted with moisture, causing the blocks to expand and crack, lose their structural integrity, leading to crumbling walls, cracked plaster, and unsafe living conditions. The presence of pyrite in the hardcore material beneath concrete slabs, especially in some cases of social housing and private builds, contributed to floor heaving and wall cracking.

== Floods ==
The River Deel and Crossmolina have a history of flooding. In 1926, heavy rainfall in North Mayo led to severe floods, inundating shops, homes, and roads, sweeping away livestock, potato pits, and turf stacks. In September 1945, the River Deel overflowed after a gale, severely flooding Chapel Street, where waters reached four feet, damaging shops. Another flood in February 1958 stranded children on Church Street, necessitating a rescue effort by the Garda.

Over the past few decades, the town has experienced further flood events, including occurrences in 1989, 2006, and twice in 2015. These floods caused significant damage, with three main streets in Crossmolina Town often submerged. During the most severe flood in December 2015, approximately 120 properties were affected by floodwater.

In 2021, the Office of Public Works and Mayo County Council proposed a comprehensive flood management scheme. Construction of the Crossmolina Flood Relief Scheme commenced on March 7, 2025. This €34 million project, led by the Office of Public Works (OPW), aims to address the persistent flooding issues that have historically affected Crossmolina and its surrounding areas. The scheme includes the construction of a diversion channel upstream of the town to redirect floodwaters away from residential and commercial properties, thereby mitigating the risk of future flood events. The project is expected to take approximately four years to complete.

== Population ==
In the census of April 2011, Crossmolina had a population of 1,060 consisting of 535 males and 526 females. The population of pre-school age (0–4) was 62 of primary school-going age (5–12) was 88 and of secondary school-going age (13–18) was 76. There were 198 persons aged 65 years and over. The number of persons aged 18 years or over was 844.

== Sport ==
=== GAA ===
The local Gaelic football team is Crossmolina Deel Rovers. Founded in 1887 as Crossmolina Dr. Crokes, the club became Deel Rovers in 1906. It enjoyed considerable success in the early 2000s, winning the Connacht Senior Club Football Championship in 1999, 2000, and 2002, as well as the 2000–01 All-Ireland Senior Club Football Championship. The club was also runner-up in the 2002–03 All-Ireland Senior Club Football Championship. In 2025, it won the All-Ireland Intermediate Club Football Championship.

=== Soccer ===
Crossmolina AFC is the town's resident football club and was founded in 1992. The club plays in the Mayo Football League system and has seen moderate success, most notably winning the Tim Hastings League 1 title in 2015.

== Places of interest ==
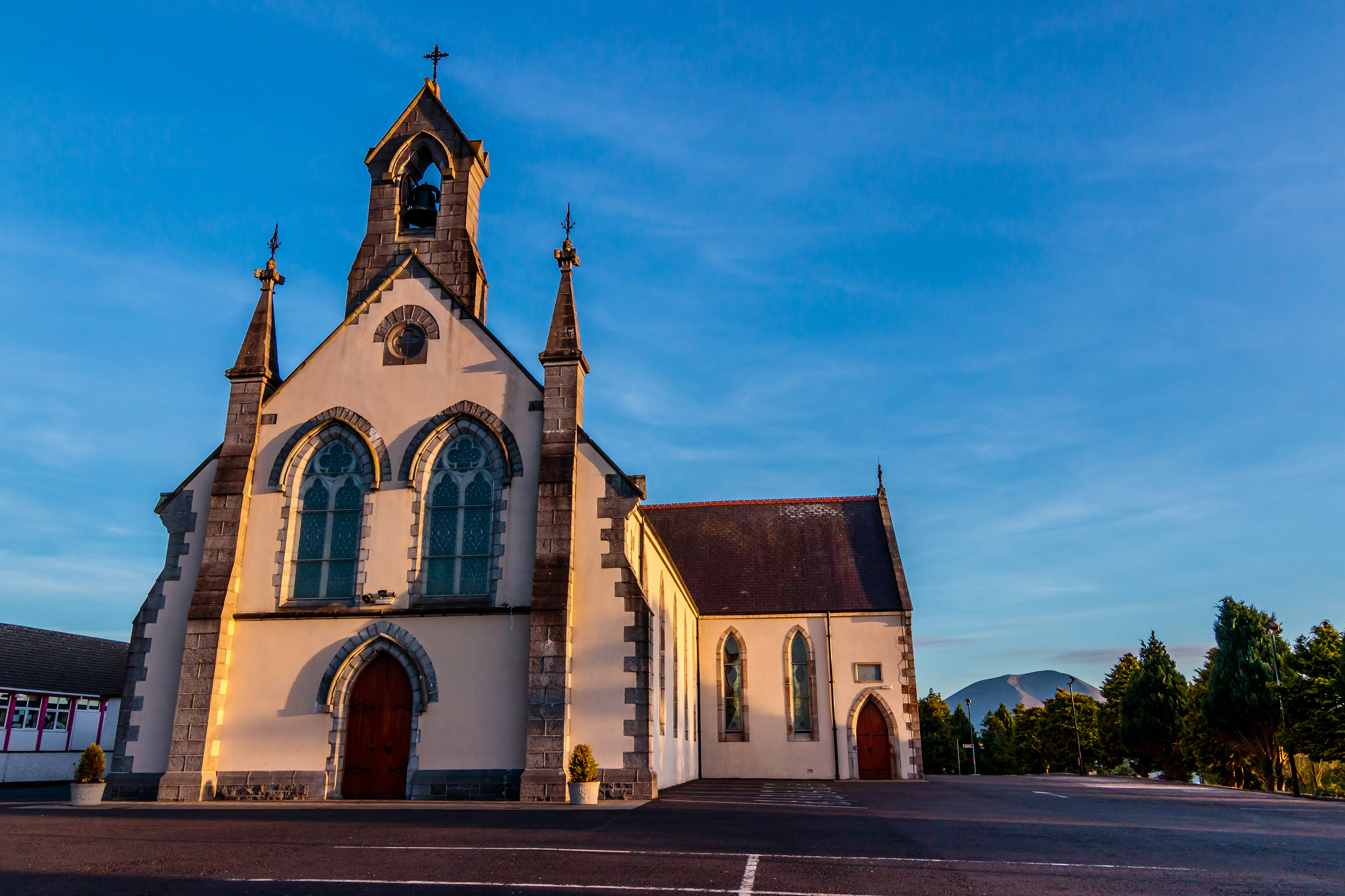
View of Saint Tiernans Church located in Crossmolina

St Mary's Church - Built in 1818–19, this early 19th-century Church of Ireland chapel was erected with the financial support of the Board of First Fruits. The interior of the church has a wall monument commemorating 'General Sir James Jackson C.C.B. K.H. who "served with distinction through the Peninsular War at Waterloo and India".

Lough Conn - Ireland's seventh-largest lake, is situated south of the town. It spans about 14,000 acres and is known for its abundant char population. Managed by the North-Western Regional Fisheries Board, it contains wild trout stocks and has never been stocked artificially. The Lough Conn Drive is a looped drive of approx 102 km around the lake.

Crossmolina Castle - Located across the road from St Mary's Church at the end of Church Street. In 1526, the castle was destroyed by O'Donnell, Chief of Tirconnell.

Gortnor Abbey - A large house, built by the Ormsby family in 1780. In 1916 it was converted into a convent boarding school run by the Jesus and Mary Order of nuns.

Errew Abbey - A ruined 13th-century Augustinian church that sits on a tiny peninsula on the banks of Lough Conn. Local tradition suggests that the original abbey was founded by St Tiernan, the patron saint of Crossmolina. The abbey was reduced to ruins by Cromwellian settlers.

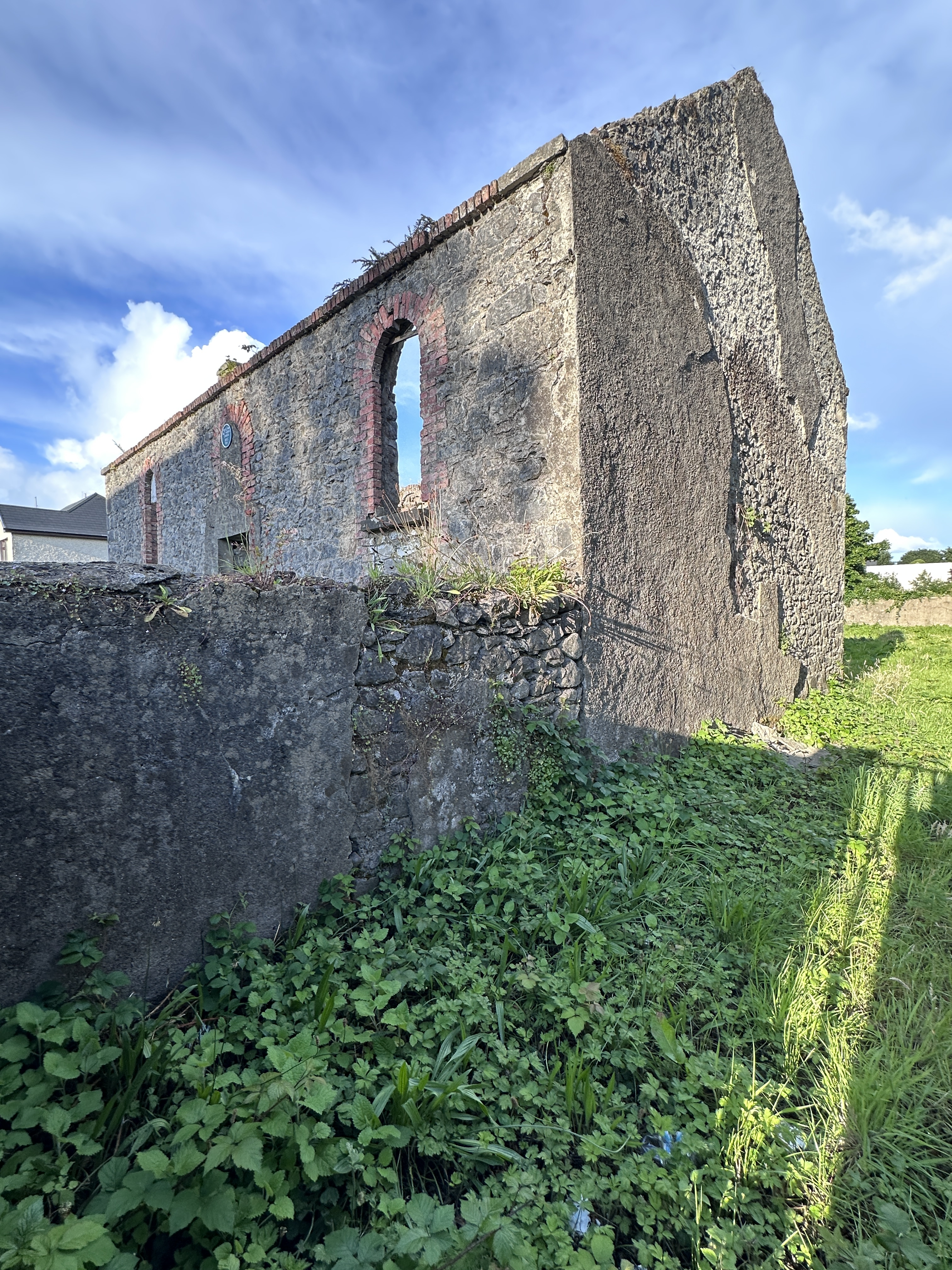
Methodist meeting hall, Crossmolina

Crossmolina Methodist Meeting House - Located on Church Street, there is the ruins of a Methodist meeting house. It was built in 1854, replacing an earlier meeting house established in 1835. The building was abandoned towards the end of the 19th century.

Saint Tiernan's Catholic Church - Built in 1859–60 on a cruciform plan, and extended in 1890–93. The church bell dates from 1907. The gothic-style altar was built in 1892.

Enniscoe House - A country house, built between 1790 and 1798, sometimes described as "the last Great House of North Mayo". The house was built for the Anglo-Irish Jackson family using stone from an old castle. In Cromwellian times, the Jacksons were granted 5,000 acres of land, which had been confiscated from the Anglo-Norman de Burgos family. At the time of the French invasion of 1798, General Humbert's men stayed at the house. It now serves as a hotel.

River Deel Pathway - A pathway runs through the town along the banks of the river. The ruins of Castle Gore and Deel Castle, dating to the 16th century, are located along the riverbank at the northern end of Lough Conn. The latter site saw construction activity continue into the 18th century with the addition of a house in 1790. However, this house suffered damage during the 1798 rebellion and was ultimately burned in the Irish Civil War of 1922–1923.

== Culture ==
Crossmolina is the subject of "Rake Street", a poem by Harry Clifton.

== Notable people ==
- Peadár Gardiner, GAA
- Conor Loftus, GAA
- Dr. Michael Loftus, 28th President of the GAA
- Seán Lowry, GAA
- John Maughan, GAA
- Ciarán McDonald, GAA
- Michael Moyles, GAA
- Patrick Moylett, Sinn Féin peace negotiator
- James Nallen, GAA
- John Nallen, GAA
- John O'Hart, an Irish historian and genealogist. He is noted for his work on ancient Irish lineage.
- Sir Roger Palmer MP (1832–1910), Anglo-Irish politician and British soldier. He was one of the principal land owners in North Mayo and had a residence in Keenagh, Crossmolina.
- Marc Roberts, musician
- Stephen Rochford, GAA
- Kevin Rowland, musician, lead singer of Dexy's Midnight Runners.
- Tom Wood, Irish photographer

== See also ==
- List of towns and villages in Ireland

== Sources ==
- Lynott, J. (1980). "A Guide to History and Antiquities West of Killala Bay"
