= 1999–2000 All-Ireland Senior Club Football Championship =

Irish Football Championship

- Dates: 3 October 1999 – 17 March 2000
- Teams: 33
- Sponsor: Allied Irish Bank
- Champions: Crossmaglen Rangers (3rd title); Anthony Cunningham (captain); Joe Kernan (manager)
- Runners-up: Na Fianna; Mick Galvin (captain); Paul Caffrey (manager)

Tournament statistics
- Matches played: 37
- Top scorer: Oisín McConville (3-29)

The 1999–2000 All-Ireland Senior Club Football Championship was the 30th staging of the All-Ireland Senior Club Football Championship since its establishment by the Gaelic Athletic Association in 1970-71. The championship began on 3 October 1999 and ended on 17 March 2000.

Crossmaglen Rangers entered the championship as the defending champions.

On 17 March 2000, Crossmaglen Rangers won the championship following a 1–14 to 0–12 defeat of Na Fianna in the All-Ireland final at Croke Park. It was their third championship title overall and their second title in succession.

Crossmaglen's Oisín McConville was the championship's top scorer with 3-29.

== Connacht ==
=== Quarter-final ===
24 October 1999 Quarter-final	Glencar–Manorhamilton	0-07 - 2-11	Tourlestrane	Páirc Seán Mac Diarmada
	R Haslette 0-3, A Rooney 0-1, M Rooney 0-1, D O'Callaghan 0-1, A Sweeney 0-1.		E Walsh 2-1, J Curley 0-2, F Kennedy 0-2, G McGowan 0-2, M Walsh 0-2, S Dunne 0-1, B Egan 0-1.

=== Semi-finals ===
7 November 1999 Semi-final	Roscommon Gaels	2-17 - 1-11	Tourlestrane	Dr Hyde Park
	R Shannon 0-6, C McDonald 1-1, J Hanly 1-1, A Nolan 0-4, M McHale 0-2, P Noone 0-2, G Kelly 0-1.		E O'Hara 1-1, G McGowan 0-4, M Walsh 0-3, J Curley 0-1, E Walsh 0-1, P Brennan 0-1.

7 November 1999 Semi-final	Killererin	0-07 - 0-12	Crossmolina Deel Rovers	Tuam Stadium
	P Joyce 0-5, T Joyce 0-1, T Ryder 0-1.		E Lavelle 0-2, J Keane 0-2, J Leonard 0-2, K McDonald 0-1, M Moyles 0-1, P McGuinness 0-1, P McAndrew 0-1, G O'Malley 0-1, P Gardiner 0-1.

=== Final ===
21 November 1999 Final	Roscommon Gael	0-09 - 0-09	Crossmolina Deel Rovers	Dr Hyde Park
	M McHale 0-5, M Ryan 0-2, R Shannon 0-2.		J Leonard 0-3, M Moyles 0-2, P McGuinness 0-2, J Keane 0-1, S Rochford 0-1.

27 November 1999 Final replay	Crossmolina Deel Rovers	1-07 - 0-05	Roscommon Gaels	Crossmolina GAA Grounds
	E Lavelle 1-1, J Keane 0-2, M Moyles 0-2, N Convey 0-1, P McGuinness 0-1, G Walsh 0-1.		A Nolan 0-2, M McHale 0-1, F O'Donnell 0-1, G Kelly 0-1.

== Leinster ==
=== First round ===
24 October 1999 First round	Rathnew	2-12 - 1-09	Dromard	Pearse Park
	T Doyle 1-1, K Gill 1-1, R Coffey 0-4, T Gill 0-3, D Coffey 0-2, M Doyle 0-1.		J Martin 1-4, S Hagan 0-2, B Kiernan 0-1, D Confrey 0-1, R Donoghue 0-1.

24 October 1999 First round	Kilanerin	5-10 - 1-08	Stabannon Parnells	Páirc Uí Shíocháin
	M Forde 4-4, J Hegarty 1-5, P Forde 0-1.		P Butterly 1-3, D Riley 0-2, I Quinn 0-1, S Sweeney 0-1, O Cunningham 0-1.

24 October 1999 First round	Sarsfields	1-11 - 0-13	O'Hanrahan's	St Conleth's Park
	David Earley 1-1, N Buckley 0-4, P Brennan 0-3, B Moylan 0-2, J Whelan 0-1.		P Kavanagh 0-4, A Kavanagh 0-4, M Carpenter 0-2, D Bermingham 0-2, D Walke r0-1.

24 October 1999 First round	Railyard	0-08 - 1-16	Athlone	St John's Park
	D Walsh 0-4, B Maguire 0-2, L Buggy 0-1, S Hennessy 0-1.		J Fallon 1-2, S Geraghty 0-3, F Murray 0-2, A Collins 0-2, S Hassett 0-2, N Dolan 0-2, B Kenny 0-1, D Prendergast 0-1, N Lynch 0-1.

=== Quarter-finals ===
7 November 1999 Quarter-final	Sarsfields	1-16 - 0-06	St Peter's Dunboyne	St Conleth's Park
	P Brennan 0-5, N Buckley 0-4, B Moylan 1-0, D Earley 0-2, J Whelan 0-2, L Brennan 0-1, B Nolan 0-1, R Cunningham 0-1.		K Gannon 0-3, N McKenna 0-1, A McEntee 0-1, N Crawford 0-1.

7 November 1999 Quarter-final	Kilanerin	0-14 - 1-06	Edenderry	Páirc Uí Shíocháin
	M Forde 0-10, J Darcy 0-1, S Hughes 0-1, D Noonan 0-1, M Hegarty 0-1.		D Flynn 1-0, T Kenny 0-3, P Brady 0-2, K Farrell 0-1.

7 November 1999 Quarter-final	Athlone	0-07 - 1-10	Portlaoise	Páirc Chiaráin
	J Fallon 0-3, N Dolan 0-2, S Hahassey 0-1, D Prendergast 0-1.		I Fitzgerald 0-7, F Fennell 1-0, K Fitzpatrick 0-2, B Fitzpatrick 0-1.

7 November 1999 Quarter-final	Rathnew	0-06 - 1-11	Na Fianna	Aughrim Park
	D Coffey 0-3, M Doyle 0-2, D Byrne 0-1.		D Farrell 1-1, M Galvin 0-4, K McGeeney 0-2, D Shearer 0-2, I Foley 0-1, S Connell 0-1.

=== Semi-finals ===
21 November 1999 Semi-final	Sarsfields	0-11 - 0-05	Kilanerin	Dr Cullen Park
	N Buckley 0-4, P Brennan 0-2, David Earley 0-2, R Cunningham 0-2, L Brennan 0-1.		J Hegarty 0-4, M Forde 0-1.

21 November 1999 Semi-final	Na Fianna	1-13 - 0-10	Portlaoise	St Conleth's Park
	I Foley 0-5, A Shearer 1-1, M Galvin 0-3, D Farrell 0-2, M Foley 0-1, D Macken 0-1.		I Fitzgerald 0-4, K Fitzpatrick 0-3, C Parkinson 0-2, E Delaney 0-1.

=== Final ===
5 December 1999 Final	Na Fianna	1-11 - 0-08	Sarsfields	Páirc Tailteann
	A Shearer 1-3, K McGeeney 0-2, K Donnolly 0-2, S McGlinchey 0-2, S Connell 0-1, I Foley 0-1.		N Buckley 0-5, P Brennan 0-2, R Coleman 0-1.

== Munster ==
=== Quarter-finals ===
24 October 1999 Quarter-final	Rathgormack	1-11 - 1-07	Moyle Rovers	Fraher Field
	M Power 0-4, P Crotty 1-0, E Hogan 0-2, A Power 0-2, R Power 0-1, T Bolger 0-1, J Murray 0-1.		D Browne 1-3, J Williams 0-1, Donal Foley 0-1, J Shanahan 0-1, R Boland 0-1.

24 October 1999 Quarter-final	Doonbeg	1-11 - 1-07	Ballylanders	Páirc Uí Seancháin
	F McInerney 1-2, P Hehir 0-3, S Ahern 0-2, D Conway 0-1, K Nugent 0-1, D Tubridy 0-1, M Conway 0-1.		N Frewan 1-1, J Murphy 0-2, D Murphy 0-2, P Lonergan 0-1, C McSweeney 0-1.

=== Semi-finals ===
7 November 1999 Semi-final	Laune Rangers	0-11 - 2-09	Doonbeg	FitzGerald Stadium
	P O'Sullivan 0-6, L Hassett 0-3, S O'Sullivan 0-1, MF Russell 0-1.		P Hehir 1-2, M Conway 1-1, K Nugent 0-3, G Killeen 0-1, P Smith 0-1, B Shanahan 0-1.

20 November 1999 Semi-final	University College Cork	0-12 - 1-09	Rathgormack	Páirc Uí Rinn
	I Twiss 0-5, L Murphy 0-4, K Moran 0-2, S Downey 0-1.		M Power 0-4, F Halpin 1-0, R Power 0-2, E Hogan 0-2, T Bulger 0-1.

20 November 1999 Semi-final replay	Rathgormack	0-07 - 0-12	University College Cork	Fraher Field
	M Power 0-4, D Crotty 0-1, E Hogan 0-1, T Bolger 0-1.		M Ó Cróinín 0-3, L Murphy 0-2, I Twiss 0-2, M Ó Sé 0-1, D Reidy 0-1, MD Cahill 0-1, E Fitzmaurice 0-1, M Downey 0-1.

=== Final ===
12 December 1999 Final	University College Cork	1-17 - 0-07	Doonbeg	Gaelic Grounds
	K Moran 1-1, I Twiss 0-4, M Ó Cróinín 0-4, L Murphy 0-2, P Galvin 0-2, B Sheehan 0-1, M Ó Sé 0-1, S Downey 0-1, F Kelleher 0-1.		P Hehir 0-4, O Conway 0-2, S Hehir 0-1.

== Ulster ==
=== Preliminary round ===
3 October 1999 Preliminary round	Castleblayney Faughs	2-06 - 1-09	Bellaghy	St Mary's Park
	P McDonald 1-1, D Sullivan 1-0, A Tavey 0-2, K Tavey 0-1, D Loughman 0-1, D Hughes 0-1.		G Diamond 1-5, P Downey 0-1, J Cassidy 0-1, D Cassidy 0-1, J Donnelly 0-1.

10 October 1999 Preliminary round replay	Bellaghy	0-15 - 1-12	Castleblayney Faughs	Dean McGlinchey Park
	J Donnelly 0-4, G Diamond 0-4, D Cassidy 0-2, C McNally 0-1, J Mulholland 0-1, F Doherty 0-1, J Cassidy 0-1, E Cassidy 0-1.		P McDonald 1-1, C Tavey 0-3, P O'Connor 0-2, E Murphy 0-1, D Duffy 0-1, A Tavey 0-1, R Tracey 0-1, R McArdle 0-1, P Duffy 0-1.

17 October 1999 Preliminary round second replay	Bellaghy	1-19 - 1-13	Castleblayney Faughs	Healy Park
	G Diamond 1-4, J Cassidy 0-3, C McNally 0-2, P Diamond 0-2, K Diamond 0-2, D Cassidy 0-2, L McPeake 0-1, J Donnelly 0-1, F Doherty 0-1, P Downey 0-1.		P McDonald 1-4, C Tavey 0-5, P O'Connor 0-2, P Duffy 0-1, R McArdle 0-1.

=== Quarter-finals ===
3 October 1999 Quarter-final	Gowna	2-07 - 0-14	Crossmaglen Rangers	Breffni Park
	Dermot McCabe 1-5, Declan McCabe 1-0, D Brady 0-1, G Pierson 0-1.		O McConville 0-7, J Fitzpatrick 0-2, A Cunningham 0-2, C Short 0-1, T McEntee 0-1, M Moley 0-1.

3 October 1999 Quarter-final	Erin's Own	0-13 - 2-06	Carrickmore St Colmcille's	Casement Park
	S McQuillan 0-8, E McCann 0-2, D McPeake 0-1, R McGuckin 0-1, JC Devlin 0-1.		P Loughran 0-5, D Loughran 1-0, P Kerr 1-0, S McCallin 0-1.

3 October 1999 Quarter-final	Burren	1-12 - 1-12	Enniskillen Gaels	Páirc Esler
	J Treanor 1-2, S White 0-5, J McAlinden 0-2, R Mussen 0-1, G Murdock 0-1, P Bradley 0-1.		R McCabe 1-3, C Bradley 0-3, T Brewster 0-3, P Brewster 0-2, O McShea 0-1.

10 October 1999 Quarter-final replay	Enniskillen Gaels	2-09 - 1-07	Burren	Brewster Park
	R McCabe 1-3, C Bradley 1-1, T Brewster 0-3, R Judge 0-2.		S White 1-3, J Treanor 0-3, G Murdock 0-1.

24 October 1999 Quarter-final	Bellaghy	2-14 - 1-08	St Eunan's	Dean McGlinchey Park
	G Diamond 0-7, J Donnelly 2-0, J Cassidy 0-4, D Cassidy 0-2, P Downey 0-1, B Lee 0-1.		B Devenney 1-2, C Mulgrew 0-2, M Crossan 0-1, B Kilcoyne 0-1, D Daly 0-1, J Haran 0-1.

=== Semi-finals ===
24 October 1999 Semi-final	Crossmaglen Rangers	1-10 - 0-11	Erin's Own	St Tiernach's Park
	O McConville 1-4, C O'Neill 0-2, J Fitzpatrick 0-1, J McEntee 0-1, C Short 0-1, G Cummiskey 0-1.		S McQuillan 0-4, D Gallagher 0-2, E McKee 0-2, R McGuckin 0-1, K Doyle 0-1.

7 November 1999 Semi-final	Enniskillen Gaels	0-12 - 0-06	Bellaghy	St Tiernach's Park
	T Brewster 0-5, S Bradley 0-2, R McCabe 0-2, R McCluskey 0-1, R Judge 0-1, G McDermott 0-1.		G Doherty 0-2, K Diamond 0-1, G Diamond 0-1, J Cassidy 0-1, L McPeake 0-1.

=== Final ===
21 November 1999 Final	Crossmaglen Rangers	0-10 - 0-09	Enniskillen Gaels	St Tiernach's Park
	O McConville 0-4, C Shorrt 0-3, J Fitzpatrick 0-1, J McEntee 0-1, J McConville 0-1.		O McShea 0-2, R McCabe 0-2, P Fitzpatrick 0-2, C Bradley 0-2, R Judge 0-1.

== Quarter-final ==
12 December 1999 Quarter-final	Hugh O'Neill's	0-03 - 8-15	Crossmolina Deel Rovers	Leeds
	G Howard 0-1, S Canavan 0-1, JP Moriarty 0-1, E Rogers 0-1.	Report	K McDonald 3-8, M Moyles 3-1, P McGuinness 1-1, G Walsh 1-0, G O'Malley 0-2, J Keane 0-1, E Lavelle 0-1, N Convoy 0-1.

== Semi-finals ==
20 February 2000 Semi-final	Na Fianna	1-10 - 2-03	Crossmolina Deel Rovers	Pearse Park
	M Galvin 0-6, D Mackin 1-0, D Farrell 0-3, M Foley 0-1.		M Moyles 1-0, P McGuinness 1-0, K McDonald 0-2, J Leonard 0-1.

20 February 2000 Semi-final	Crossmaglen Rangers	2-16 - 3-06	University College Cork	Parnell Park
	O McConville 1-8 (4f), C Short 0-3, G Cumiskey 1-0, J McConville 0-2, J McEntee, T McEntee, J Donaldson 0-1 each.	Report	M Ó Cróinín 2-2 (2f), M Cahill 1-1, L Murphy 0-2, K Moran 0-1.

== Final ==
17 March 2000 Final	Crossmaglen Rangers	1-14 - 0-12	Na Fianna	Croke Park
	O McConville 1-6, 5 frees, 1 `45', J McEntee, C Shortt, M Moley 0-2 each, J Fitzpatrick, T McEntee 0-1 each.	Report	M Galvin 0-5, 2 frees, D Farrell 0-2, S Connell, K Donnelly, D Mackin, A Shearer, I Foley 0-1 each.	Referee: M Curley (Galway)

== Statistics ==
=== Top scorers ===
Overall

Rank	Player	Club	Tally	Total	Matches	Average
1	Oisín McConville	Crossmaglen Rangers	3-29	38	5	7.60
2	Mattie Forde	Kilanerin	4-15	27	3	9.00
2	Gavin Diamond	Bellaghy	2-21	27	5	5.40
3	Ciarán McDonald	Crossmolina Deel Rovers	3-11	20	3	6.66
4	Michael Moyles	Crossmolina Deel Rovers	4-06	18	5	3.60
4	Mick Galvin	Na Fianna	0-18	18	4	4.50
5	Niall Buckley	Sarsfields	0-17	17	4	4.25
6	Ronan McCabe	Enniskillen Gaels	2-10	16	4	4.00
7	Pádraic McDonald	Castleblayney Faughs	3-06	15	3	5.00
7	Mícheál Ó Cróinín	UCC	2-09	15	4	3.75

In a single game

Rank	Player	Club	Tally	Total	Opposition
1	Ciarán McDonald	Crossmolina Deel Rovers	3-08	17	Hugh O'Neills
2	Mattie Forde	Kilanerin	4-04	16	Stabannon Parnells
3	Oisín McConville	Crossmaglen Rangers	1-08	11	UCC
4	Michael Moyles	Crossmolina Deel Rovers	3-01	10	Hugh O'Neills
4	Mattie Forde	Kilanerin	0-10	10	Edenderry
5	Oisín McConville	Crossmaglen Rangers	2-03	9	Na Fianna
6	Mícheál Ó Cróinín	UCC	2-02	8	Crossmaglen Rangers
6	John Hegarty	Kilanerin	1-05	8	Stabannon Parnells
6	Gavin Diamond	Bellaghy	1-05	8	Castleblayney Faughs
6	Dermot McCabe	Gowna	1-05	8	Crossmaglen Rangers
6	Sheeny McQuillan	Erin's Own	0-08	8	Carrickmore St Colmcille's

=== Miscellaneous ===
- Na Fianna won the Leinster Club Championship for the first time in their history.
- Crossmolina Deel Rovers won the Connacht Club Championship for the first time in their history.
