= Liam Moffatt (Gaelic footballer) =

Irish Gaelic footballer

Liam Moffatt (born 1970s) is an Irish former Gaelic footballer who played for Crossmolina Deel Rovers and the Mayo county team. He played senior inter-county football for Mayo, and won the 2001 All-Ireland Senior Club Football Championship title with Crossmolina. He played for UCG in the Sigerson Cup, and also featured in two finals of the All-Ireland Under-21 Football Championship with his county.

Moffatt is a physiotherapist, and is originally from Crossmolina. After retiring he worked as the lead physio for Mayo GAA. In 2019, he was elected as chairman of the Mayo County Board. Shortly after the 2021 All-Ireland Senior Football Championship final, which Mayo lost to Tyrone, Moffatt resigned as chairman for "business and personal reasons".
