= William Stack (priest) =

15th-century Irish priest

William Stack was an Irish Anglican priest in the 15th century: he was Archdeacon of Aghadoe during 1408.
