= John Fahy =

John Fahy may refer to:

- John Fahy (footballer) (1943–2023), Scottish football player
- John Fahy (priest) (1893–1969), Irish priest, republican, agrarian and radical
- John Fahy (Archdeacon of Aghadoe) (died 1924)

== See also ==
- John Fahey (disambiguation)
