= Kobe McDonald =

Mayo and Crossmolina Deel Rovers Gaelic footballer

Personal information
- Native name: Kobe Mac Dómhnaill (Irish)
- Born: 8 December 2007 (age 18) Mayo, Ireland
- Height: 6 ft 4 in (193 cm)
- Relative: Ciarán McDonald (Father)

Sport
- Sport: Gaelic Football, Australian Rules
- Position: Corner Forward
Club
- Years: Club
- 2025–2026: Crossmolina Deel Rovers
Inter-county*
Years	County	Apps (scores)
2026	Mayo	7 (1–28)
Inter-county titles
- All-Irelands: 1
- All Stars: 1
- *Inter County team apps and scores correct as of 26 July 2026.

Kobe McDonald (Irish: Kobe Mac Dómhnaill; born 8 December 2007) is an Irish professional Australian rules footballer and former Gaelic footballer who plays for the St Kilda Football Club in the Australian Football League (AFL). He previously played Gaelic football as a forward for the Mayo county team and at club level for Crossmolina Deel Rovers, before switching codes and joining St Kilda in 2026.

== Personal life ==
McDonald's father is former Mayo gaelic footballer and All Star Ciarán McDonald. He is named after Kobe Bryant. He is a half brother of fellow Mayo footballer, Jordan Flynn.

McDonald attended Gortnor Abbey in Crossmolina.

== GAA Career ==
=== Crossmolina Deel Rovers ===
==== Underage ====
McDonald won a Mayo Minor A championship in 2025. It was Crossmolina's first Minor A title in 32 years.

==== Senior ====
McDonald started playing adult football with Crossmolina in 2025.

=== Mayo ===
==== Underage ====
===== Minor =====
In 2024, McDonald won the Connacht Minor Football Championship with Mayo subsequently reaching the All-Ireland Minor Football Championship semi-final, losing to Armagh. He finished the year as the leading scorer in the minor football championship, amassing 4-30 across 7 matches.

===== Under 20 =====
McDonald was a member of the Under-20 panel as well as the senior panel in 2026. Keith Higgins served as manager of the U-20 Mayo team. Mayo qualified for the Connacht final against Roscommon.

==== Senior ====
===== National League =====
McDonald made his senior debut for Mayo in a league win over Monaghan on 22 February 2026, scoring 1-4. In his second league appearance, McDonald scored 0-02 in a win versus Armagh. McDonald’s final 2026 league appearance was in a 16 point loss to Kerry, he scored 0-01.

===== Connacht Senior Football Championship =====
McDonald made his championship debut as an 18-year-old Leaving Cert student against Roscommon. Starting corner-forward, he scored 0-06 as Mayo lost 2-25 to 1-18.

===== All-Ireland Senior Football Championship =====
Mayo were drawn to face Monaghan in Round 1 of the All-Ireland Championship. In Clones, Mayo won on a 1-24 to 2-20 scoreline. McDonald contributed 1-04 from corner forward.

Mayo played Tyrone in the winners' side of Round 2.

After their Round 2 loss, Mayo were drawn against Meath in Round 3.

Mayo beat Cork in the All-Ireland Quarter-Final on a 0-23 to 0-18 scoreline. McDonald scored 0-04 in his first senior appearance in Croke Park. He scored 0-04 against Louth in the All-Ireland Semi-Final.

On 26 July 2026, McDonald won the 2026 All-Ireland Football Championship with Mayo, scoring 0-03 (1x45). He was selected at 15 in The Sunday Game 2026 Team of the Year.

== AFL Career ==
Kobe McDonald

Personal information
- Full name: Kobe McDonald
- Born: 8 December 2007 (age 18); Mayo, Ireland
- Original team: Crossmolina Deel Rovers/Mayo
- Draft: Category B
- Height: 193 cm (6 ft 4 in)
- Position: Defender

Club information
- Current club: St Kilda
- Number: 42

Playing career
Years	Club	Games (Goals)
2026–present	St Kilda	

In November 2025, McDonald signed with St. Kilda as a Category B rookie. His arrival in Australia was delayed until August 2026 to allow him to complete his Leaving Certificate examinations and to compete in the All-Ireland Senior Football Championship.

== Underage GAA Statistics ==
As of match played 31 May 2026

Team	Year	Connacht		All-Ireland		Total	
Team	Year	Apps	Score	Apps	Score	Apps	Score
Mayo Minor	2023	0	0-00	0	0–00	0	0–00
Mayo Minor	2024	5	3-21	2	1–09	7	4–30
Mayo U-20	2026	0	0-00	0	0–00	0	0–00
Total		0	0-00	0	0–00	0	0–00

== Senior GAA Statistics ==
As of match played 26 July 2026

Team	Year	FBD Insurance League		National League			Connacht		All-Ireland		Total	
Team	Year	Apps	Score	Division	Apps	Score	Apps	Score	Apps	Score	Apps	Score
Mayo	2026	0	0-00	Division 1	3	1–07	1	0–06	6	1–22	10	2–35
Mayo	Total	0	0-00		3	1–07	1	0–06	6	1–22	10	2–35

== Championship appearances ==
List of appearances
	Date	Venue	Opponent	Score	Result	W/L/D	Competition
1	26 April 2026	MacHale Park	Roscommon	0–06	1–18 : 2–25	L	Connacht Semi-Final
2	31 May 2026	St Tiernach's Park	Monaghan	1–04	1–24 : 2–20	W	All-Ireland Round 1
3	14 June 2026	Healy Park	Tyrone	0–03	1–18 : 0–22	L	All-Ireland Round 2A
4	20 June 2026	MacHale Park	Meath	0–04	0–22 : 2–13	W	All-Ireland Round 3
5	27 June 2026	Croke Park	Cork	0–04	0–23 : 0–18	W	All-Ireland Quarter-Final
6	11 July 2026	Croke Park	Louth	0–04	3–23 : 0–15	W	All-Ireland Semi-Final
7	26 July 2026	Croke Park	Kerry	0–03	1–20 : 1–17	W	All-Ireland Final

== GAA Honours ==
=== Mayo ===
- All-Ireland Senior Football Championship
  - (1): 2026
- Connacht Minor Football Championship
  - (1): 2024

=== Crossmolina Deel Rovers ===
- Mayo Minor A Football Championship
  - (1): 2025
- Mayo Under 16 A Football Championship
  - (1): 2023
