= Tommy Jordan =

Gaelic football manager

Personal information
- Native name: Tomás Shiúrdáin (Irish)
- Occupation: Prison officer (Castlerea)

Sport
Club management
- Years: Club
- c. 2000–2007: Crossmolina Deel Rovers
- 1
Inter-county management
- Years: Team
- 2007–2008: Sligo

Tommy Jordan is a Gaelic football manager. He managed Crossmolina Deel Rovers to the 2000–01 All-Ireland Senior Club Football Championship and, after unsuccessfully applying for the role of senior manager of the Mayo county team, later managed the Sligo county team from 2007, shortly after the county had won the Connacht Senior Football Championship. The Sligo appointment meant that, with John Maughan already managing Roscommon, two men from the same club were managing two of Connacht's five counties. Because Sligo were relegated to Division 4 of the National Football League, the GAA forced the reigning Connacht champions to participate in the Tommy Murphy Cup instead of the All-Ireland qualifiers when they exited the provincial championship; the county's exit to London in that competition after many players (including Eamonn O'Hara) declined to participate, led Jordan to resign.

Jordan has been described as "quietly spoken". Stephen Rochford has cited Jordan as a coaching influence.

Sporting positions
Preceded by Tommy Breheny	Sligo Senior Football Manager; 2007–2008	Succeeded by Kevin Walsh
