= Ezechiel Webbe =

Irish Anglican priest

Ezechiel Webbe (9 July 1658 – 13 September 1704) was an Anglican priest in Ireland at the end of 17th and the beginning of the 18th centuries.

Webbe was born in Athlone and educated at Corpus Christi College, Oxford and Trinity College, Dublin. He was Archdeacon of Kildare from 1675 to 1681. Webbe was appointed Dean of Limerick in 1691 and Archdeacon of Aghadoe in 1692, holding both posts until his death.
