= Thomas Hynde =

Irish Anglican priest

Thomas Hynde, D.D. (d. 1689) was an Anglican priest in Ireland during the Seventeenth-century.

Hynde was educated at Brasenose College, Oxford. He was Chaplain to James Butler, 1st Duke of Ormond. He was Archdeacon of Aghadoe from 1676 to his death; Precentor of Christ Church Cathedral, Dublin from 1679 to 1680; and Dean of Limerick from 1680 until his death.
