= Stephen Rochford =

Gaelic football coach and former player

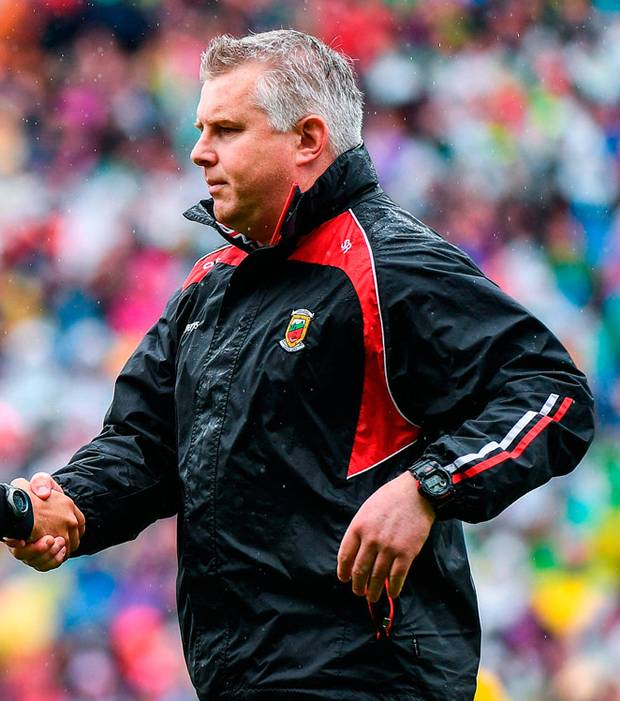

Personal information
- Native name: Stiofán de Rosfort (Irish)

Sport
- Sport: Gaelic football
Club management
- Years: Club
- 2013–2015: Corofin
		1	1
Inter-county management
- Years: Team
- 2015–2018: Mayo
Inter-county titles as manager
County	League	Province	All-Ireland
2	0	0	0

Stephen Rochford (born 10 October 1978) is an Irish Gaelic football coach and former manager and player. He was manager of the senior Mayo county team from 2015 to 2018.

Raised in Crossmolina, County Mayo, he won Connacht schools titles for Gortnor Abbey. He simultaneously came to prominence at juvenile and underage levels with the Crossmolina team, winning a county under-21 championship medal in 1997. By this stage Rochford had joined the Crossmolina senior team and won an All-Ireland medal in 2001. He also won three Connacht medals and six County Senior Championship medals.

Rochford made his debut on the inter-county scene at the age of sixteen when he first linked up with the Mayo minor team. A Connacht medal winner as captain of the team in 1996, he subsequently joined the Mayo under-21 team. Rochford made his senior debut during the 1999-00 league and spent one season with the team.

While still a player, Rochford began his coaching and managerial career when he served as a Mayo minor selector for two seasons. After finishing the year as All-Ireland runners-up in 2005, he later coached the Mayo under-21 team to an All-Ireland B title in 2007. After a period working with the Mayo-Galway IT Team in the Sigerson Cup, he managed Corofin to the All-Ireland title in 2015. Rochford was appointed manager of the Mayo senior team in November 2015.

== Early and personal life ==
Rochford grew up in the St Patrick's Avenue area of Crossmolina in County Mayo, Ireland, where he was educated at Crossmolina Boys' National School and Gortnor Abbey Secondary School. He was introduced to football by primary school teacher John Cosgrove and Crossmolina coach Tom McNulty.

He represented Mayo as a minor, winning a Connacht championship in 1996, as captain.

Rochford can be seen as a young boy in the Crossmolina Deel Rovers video by Tom McNulty on YouTube.

As of 2015, Rochford was a bank manager for AIB in Castlerea.

== Playing career ==
Stephen Rochford
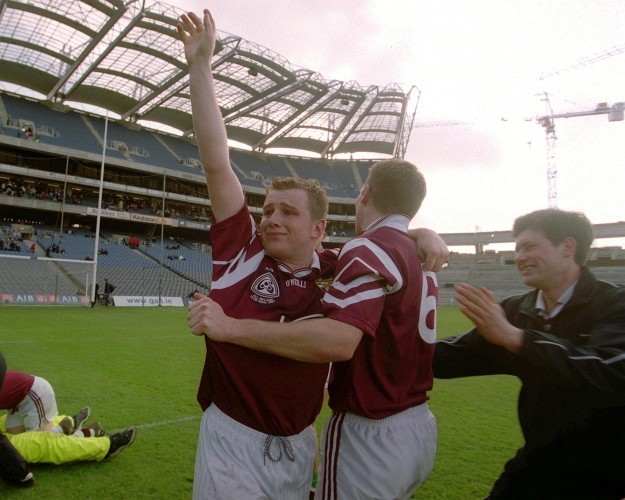

Personal information
- Native name: Stiofán de Rosfort (Irish)
- Born: 10 October 1978 (age 48) Crossmolina, County Mayo, Ireland
- Occupation: Bank manager

Sport
- Sport: Gaelic football
- Position: Left wing-back
Club
- Years: Club
- Crossmolina
Club titles
- Mayo titles: 6
- Connacht titles: 3
- All-Ireland Titles: 1
Inter-county
Years	County	Apps (scores)
1996–2001	Mayo	0 (0–0)
Inter-county titles
- Connacht titles: 1
- All-Irelands: 0
- NFL: 0
- All Stars: 0

Rochford came through the Crossmolina Deel Rovers system alongside Ciarán McDonald, Peadár Gardiner and Sigerson Cup winner Michael Moyles, and was part of the talented Crossmolina team that won six County titles between 1995 and 2006.

Rochford won an All-Ireland club Championship medal with Crossmolina in 2001 and a runners-up medal in 2003.

== Managerial career ==
Rochford began coaching Junior Crossmolina and Mayo teams, experiencing success.

Rochford managed Galway club Corofin to the All-Ireland club Championship in 2015, becoming the first man to win All-Ireland club football medals as both a player and a manager with different clubs.

=== Mayo manager ===
Rochford was named as the new manager of the Mayo senior football team in December 2015 for a three-year spell.

Within a year, Rochford had led the Mayo team to the 2016 All-Ireland Senior Football Championship Final against Dublin, where the first final ended in a draw. Rochford's men lost the reply by a point in a very close encounter.

In the 2017 All-Ireland semi-final, Mayo played Kerry. Rochford's men drew the game. In the replay Mayo overwhelmed Kerry by 2-16 to 0-17, earning a second All-Ireland SFC final appearance for Mayo under Rochford within two years of his taking over as Mayo Bainisteoir. In that game, Rochford's Mayo team again lost out by a single point against Dublin.

In June 2018, Rochford's Mayo lost to Kildare by a scoreline of 0-21 - 0-19 in the All-Ireland SFC Third Round, which was the first time in eight years that Mayo lost a game in the back-door. On 27 August 2018, Rochford resigned as Mayo manager.

=== Since 2022 ===
Bernard Flynn named Rochford as part of his backroom team as Meath manager as he prepared to succeed Andy McEntee in 2022, then Colm O'Rourke was appointed manager instead. Flynn deleted a tweet about Rochford. Shortly after this, Rochford was named as part of Kevin McStay's bid for the senior Mayo managerial vacancy. McStay's bid was successful, so Rochford returned to Mayo in August 2022. McStay named him as his assistant manager and coach.

In 2025, under the management of McStay, Mayo lost to Cavan in a championship game for the first time since the 1948 All-Ireland SFC final. Less than a week later, McStay became ill during training at MacHale Park. On 26 May, McStay stepped back from managing Mayo to deal with his health problems and former manager Stephen Rochford took his place. Rochford was interim manager for two games, as Mayo made an early championship exit. The Mayo County Board then decided to "relieve Kevin McStay and his management team from their roles" with the team, although their four-year term was not complete.

Sporting positions
Preceded by Noel Connelly and Pat Holmes	Mayo Senior Football Manager; 2015–2018	Succeeded by James Horan
