= Michael Moyles =

Irish Gaelic footballer and trainer

Personal information
- Native name: Mícheál Maolmhuire (Irish)
- Born: 5 June 1977 (age 49) Castlebar, County Mayo, Ireland
- Occupation: Teacher
- Height: 6 ft 3 in (191 cm)

Sport
- Sport: Gaelic football
- Position: Midfielder
Club
- Years: Club
- Crossmolina
Club titles
- Mayo titles: 6
- Connacht titles: 3
- All-Ireland Titles: 1
College
- Years: College
- 2001–2005: Sligo IT
College titles
- Sigerson titles: 3
Inter-county
Years	County	Apps (scores)
1996–2009	Mayo	0 (0–0)
Inter-county titles
- Connacht titles: 2
- All-Irelands: 0
- NFL: 1
- All Stars: 0

Michael Moyles is a former Gaelic footballer who played for Crossmolina and the Mayo county team. He also managed the Mayo ladies' football team from 2021 to 2023 where they won their first silverware since 2016.

== Background ==
Moyles is from the St Mary's Park area of Crossmolina, County Mayo, Ireland where he was educated at Crossmolina St Tiernan's Boys' National School and Gortnor Abbey Secondary School. He was introduced to Gaelic by his primary school teacher John Cosgrove. Moyles played alongside Ciarán McDonald for Crossmolina and Mayo. He represented Mayo at all levels.

== Personal life ==
Moyles is currently a teacher in St Tiernan's College, Crossmolina.

== Player ==
Moyles came through the Crossmolina Deel Rovers system alongside Ciarán McDonald, Peadár Gardiner and Stephen Rochford. He was part of the talented Crossmolina team that won six Moclair Cups between 1995 and 2006. Moyles won the Sigerson Cup with Sligo IT in 2004, but his career was cut short due to a spinal injury.

Moyles has Connacht Championship, National League, Sigerson Cup and All-Ireland club Championship medals.

== Coaching career ==
Moyles coached at various levels including the Sligo Minor team. He has coached in various roles throughout Connacht and has developed a good reputation on his knowledge of the game. His townsman and former teammate Stephen Rochford was later manager of the Mayo senior team.

He has been a trainer for Leitrim.

Moyles was a coach for Knockmore, helping them to the semi-finals of the 2015 Mayo Championship and the final in the following year.

In January 2021, Moyles was announced as the new Mayo LGFA manager, and coached the side to semi-final appearances in both the league and championship campaigns. In 2023 Moyles stepped down as manager after three semi-final championship appearances and winning the Connacht championship once, the first silverware the Mayo ladies team had acquired since 2016.

== Quotes ==
We try and play a free-flowing style and that's why we have won a lot of admirers in Sligo this year. I was always taught by Crossmolina and by Mayo to keep it simple and that's my approach. I don't believe in the blanket-defence style of football but at the same time, whatever has to be done next Saturday will have to be done.

We're working on the cuteness.

Success breeds success. The Mayo and Galway minor teams always seem to have a bit of confidence that comes from the success of their senior teams. That kind of confidence is something that we're trying to instill in our players. The mentality of being good losers is gone out the window. I want to be judged by our success.

Professionalism is very important now too, all our lads are kitted out in the same gear now and I believe that when they walk around they should feel special, they should feel 10 feet tall, because they’re Sligo footballers. We want our lads to be professional, to get used to doing the right thing, and preparing the right way.

I've also learnt an awful lot down through the years from the managers I've played under, the likes of Pat Holmes, John Maughan and Martin McHugh.

Talking to some current Mayo players, they absolutely love playing in Croke Park. It used to be a big hoodoo for Mayo footballers but this current group is a different crop who like the fast ball and the running game.
