= Crossmolina AFC =

Football club in County Mayo, Ireland

- Founded: 1993

Crossmolina AFC is an association football club based in Crossmolina, a town in County Mayo, Ireland. It was founded in June 1992.

== History ==
Crossmolina AFC began as an under 18 side and joined the Mayo Association Football League in Reserve Division Two for the 1993–94 season. In the early days, the club played its home games at the Convent of Jesus and Mary school at Gortnor Abbey, where the playing surface was in poor condition. However, the club later moved to the community pitch in Kilmurry before finally securing a 25-year lease on their own pitch in Abbeytown.

In 1994, the club finished second in Division Three, earning them promotion to the second division. They continued to progress and earned promotion once again in 1996. This promotion was secured through a playoff victory, with a 2–1 win in the first leg and a 2–2 draw in the return leg. The club has remained in Division One (now called the Premier Division) since then.

In 1999, the club reached the Tuohy Cup Final but were defeated 2–1 by Achill Rovers, the reigning Mayo champions. In the same year, they won the League Cup, defeating the reigning Mayo champions Manulla. The club has participated in several cup finals, including the Westaro Cup and the Tuohy Cup.

In 2015, the club won the Tim Hastings League 2 title. The following year the club were the Tim Hasting League 1 runners-up.

In 2023, the club formed its first ever women's team.

== Club colours ==
The club's away strip is a green jersey with white shorts and their home attire is a maroon jersey.

== Club facilities ==
The club secured a 25-year lease on their premises from the Mayo County Council in December 2001, followed by planning permission in February 2002. In July 2003, the club received a grant of €35,000 from the Department of Tourism, Culture, Arts, Gaeltacht, Sport and Media, enabling them to commence the construction of a clubhouse. The completion of the clubhouse was made possible by another grant in 2005, which provided an additional €18,000. The new clubhouse replaced the old dressing rooms, which had been in a dilapidated state for many years.

== Club honours ==
- 1993 – Seven a Side Competition Winners (hosted by Ballina United)
- 1993/94 – Division Three runners-up
- 1994 – Tonra Cup winners – (beat Manulla B)
- 1996 – Division Two champions
- 1996 – Kilkelly Cup runners-up (lost 2–0 to Ballyglass)
- 1996 – Tonra Cup runners-up
- 1997 – Mayo League Team of the Month (December)
- 1999 – Tuohy Cup runners-up (lost 2–1 to Achill Rovers)
- 2005 – Promoted to Super League
- 2005 – Mayo League Club of the Month (September)
- 2005 – Tuohy Cup winners (beat Ballinrobe Town on penalties)
- 2006 – Westaro Cup runners-up (lost 3–0 to Castlebar Celtic)
- 2015 – Tim Hastings League 2 champions
- 2016 – Mayo League Club of the Month (April)
- 2016 – Tim Hasting League 1 runners-up
- 2017 – Tuohy cup runners up (lost 1–0 to Knock Kiltimagh)
- 2019 – Tonra cup winners (won 3-1 vs Claremorris B)
