= Tom Nallen =

Irish Gaelic footballer

Tom Nallen is an Irish former Gaelic footballer who was captain of the Crossmolina Deel Rovers, as well as the Mayo county team. Playing as a full-back, Nallen was known as "The Riddler". His brother James and their uncle John also played for Mayo and Crossmolina.

With Mayo he won the 2001 National Football League title. In the 2001 Connacht Senior Football Championship Nallen scored a goal in Mayo's game against Sligo.

As his club's captain, Nallen was the first person from a Mayo GAA team to raise the Andy Merrigan Cup after Crossmolina's victory in the 2001 All-Ireland Senior Club Football Championship final. He had earlier captained his club to the 1999 Mayo Senior Football Championship title. As of 2009, he was still playing for his club while based in Dublin, with Allianz.
