= Enaghbeg =

Townland in County Mayo, Ireland

Coordinates: 54.21678°N 9.24222°W

Enaghbeg (Irish: An tAonach Beag) is a townland in the barony of Tirawley, in County Mayo, Ireland. It is in the Electoral Division of Deel, in a civil parish of Crossmolina. Agriculture is the primary economic activity.

The townland is situated west of Crossmolina and north of the N59 main road to Belmullet. Enaghbeg borders the following other townlands: Ballinlabaun to the south; Freeheen to the east; Gortnahurra Upper to the west; Knockbaun to the east; Polladoohy to the west; Rathmore to the north and Tobermore to the south. It has an area of 1,622,994 m^{2} / 162.30 hectares / 1.6230 km^{2}. This is equivalent to 0.63 square miles or 401.05 acres / 401 acres, 0 roods, 8 perches.

== History ==
Enaghbeg is marked on the 1670 Down Survey maps for County Mayo. The survey attributes ownership of the land to Andrew Ram, a Protestant. The townland is also mentioned in 1757 in a public announcement in Pue's Occurrences, an 18th-century Irish newspaper. The announcement makes reference to a legal dispute between two local landlords - George Jackson as plaintiff and Roger Palmer the elder and Roger Palmer the junior as defendants. The townland, along with neighboring districts, were put up for sale to resolve the dispute. In the announcement, Enaghbeg was also referred to as Lenagh.

A number of residents are recorded as paying Tithes - taxes to the established Church of Ireland - in the Tithe Applotment Books of 1833. Prominent family names appearing in the register include Gill, Ruane, Mullen, Sweeney and McLoghlin. In the 1841 census, Enaghbeg had a population of 161 Fifteen households are recorded in the 1901 census, with a population of 74, down from 96 inhabitants recorded in the 1891 census.

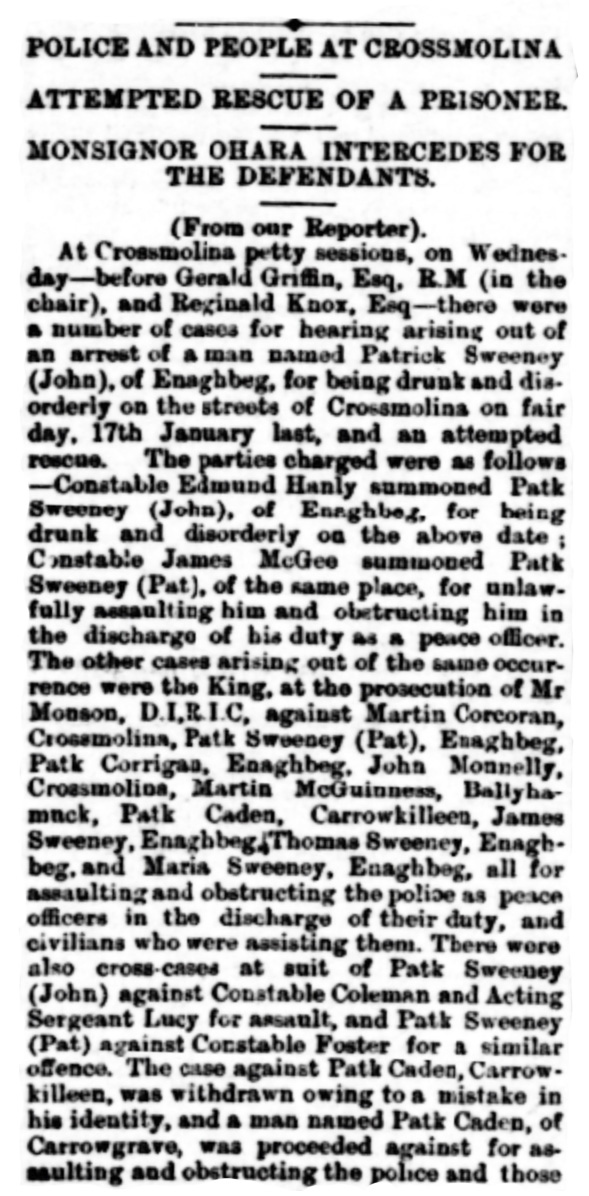
ATTEMPTED RESCUE OF A PRISONER. Western People - Saturday 08 February 1902

In 1896, the local sub sanitary officer - Mr. Fleming - visited the townland and found a large number of open manure pits. He served notices on 12 households to clean up the pits. In July 1897, he visited the townland again and found that many of the pits remained. He served legal summonses on a number of houses.

In January 1930, a locally renowned "bone setter" died at the age of 106. Robert Gill, who came from a long line of family bone setters, lived relatively close to Ballina and its railway station but had reportedly never seen a train. His death was announced in a number of Irish local newspapers.

== Agricultural disputes ==
Given the heavy dependence on agricultural activities in Enaghbeg, rent arrears, land disputes between neighbors, and conflicts with cattle dealers were common and occasionally led to litigation, in some cases, between family members.

In October 1911, Patrick Sweeney, the executor of this father's estate, applied to the court to evict his brother Daniel from two pieces of land in Enaghbeg. The application for eviction was successful. Patrick Sweeney was also sued in 1926 by a cattle dealer from Swinford over a breach of contract relating to the sale of a cow. In1928, the same Sweeney brothers were among a number of individuals from Crossmolina who were sued for non payment of Conacre rents by their landlord. Although a conacre rent was essentially a short-term lease on a piece of land, the arrears in question had built up over many years. The judge was in no hurry to hear the case and decided to adjourn the matter to an unspecified later date. In 1926, Robert Gill sued his brother Michael Gill and his wife Anne over the non payment of Conacre rents. Originally, the lease was taken out in the name of Robert and Patrick's mother. After she died, a dispute arose between the brothers. The court ruled in favor of Robert.

In January 1919, Peter Gill sued James and Martin Sweeney for damages related to the trespass of a donkey owned by the Sweeneys. Gil claimed that the and had caused damage to his farm amounting to £10. After hearing the evidence, the judge ruled against Peter Gill.

In 1930, Peter McGoff of Enaghbeg sued his neighbor Francis Kilroy on the grounds of obstruction. The cause of the dispute was a poorly worded deed arising out of sale of land in 1922. The deed did not adequately specify rights of access to various small land holdings within the townland. McGoff lost the case.

In 1940, an Enaghbeg farmer - James McHugh - sued Jack Moran, a cattle dealer from Ballyhaunus for the recovery of £25 10s for breach of warranty in the sale of five calves. McHugh claimed that the calves were diseased at the time of sale. McHugh received compensation for two of the calves he purchased.

In 1936, the residents of Enaghbeg, along with those in the neighboring Townlands of Pulladoohy and Rathmore petitioned the Mayo County Council regarding flooding caused by the Enaghbeg river. The Irish land commission had started to drain the nearby bog, pumping the excess water into the river. This caused flooding of the farmland upstream. The residents asked the council to widen the river and clear debris.

== Places of interest ==
=== Enaghbeg National School ===
The townland had a National school, which was built in 1896 at a cost of £381. It replaced an earlier school, in Rathmore, which was built in 1833. Enaghbeg and Richmond National Schools were amalgamated in 1971.

=== Megalithic tomb ===
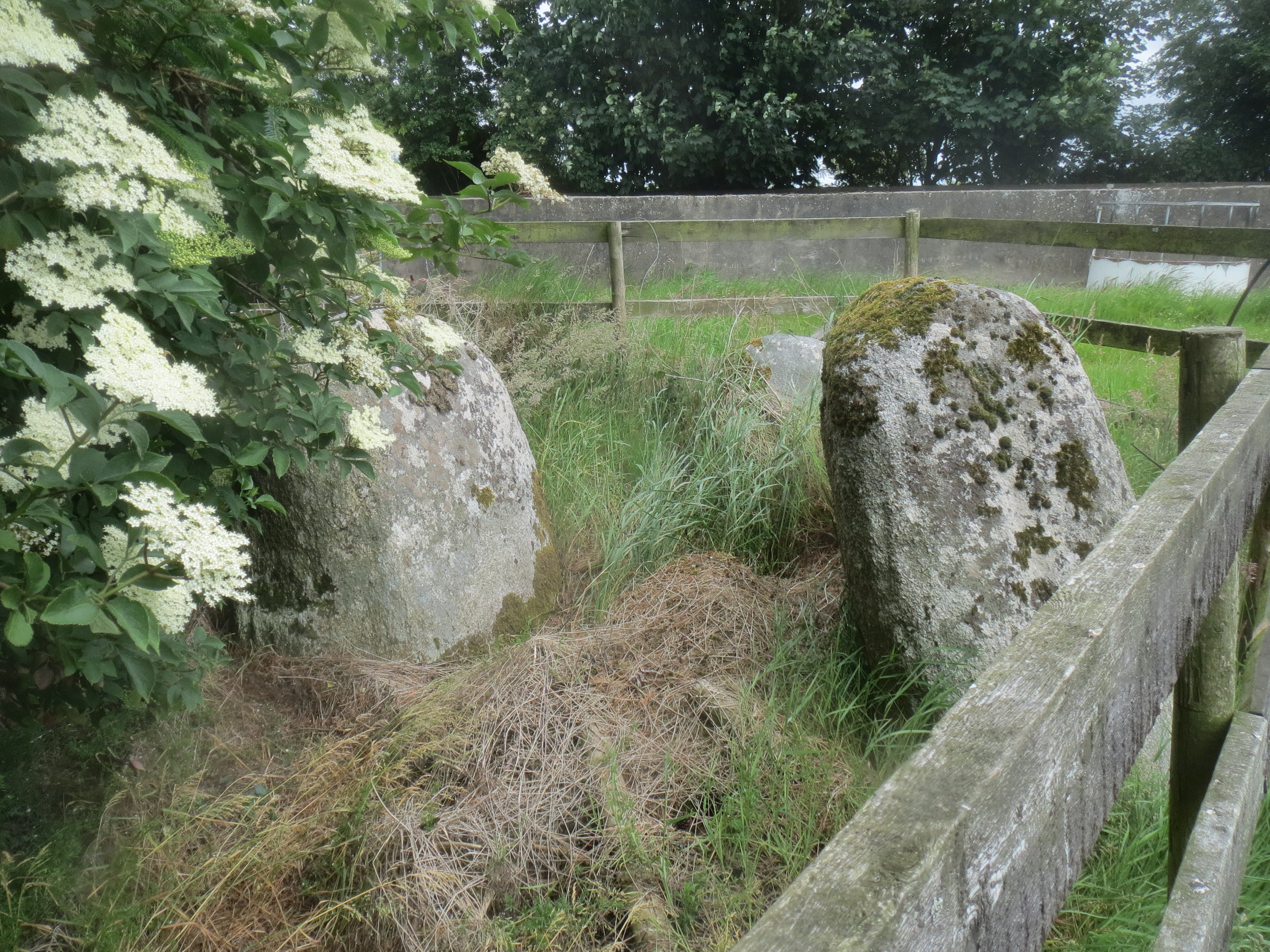
Megalithic tomb

Enaghbeg has the remains of a megalithic portal tomb in a field by the road that runs through the center of the townland. The site is scheduled for inclusion in the next survey of National Inventory of Architectural Heritage.

=== Enaghbeg River ===
A tributary of the Deel river that runs through the townland.
