= John Fahey =

John Fahey may refer to:

- Jock Fahey (1911–1936), Australian rules footballer and coach
- Jackie Fahey (1928–2019), Irish politician
- John Fahey (musician) (1939–2001), American guitarist and composer
- John Fahey (equestrian) (born 1943), Australian Olympic equestrian
- John Fahey (politician) (1945–2020), Australian politician and president of the World Anti-Doping Agency
- John M. Fahey Jr. (fl. 1990s–2010s), CEO and president of the National Geographic Society

== See also ==
- John Fahy (disambiguation)
- John Fare, called John Fahey in some accounts
