= John Fahy (Archdeacon of Aghadoe) =

John George Fahy was Archdeacon of Aghadoe from 1912 to 1922; and of Ardfert and Aghadoe from then until his death on 4 January 1924.

Fahy was educated at Trinity College, Dublin and ordained in 1878. He began his career with curacies at Kilmore and Tuam. He was the Incumbent at Dromod from 1883 to his death; and Treasurer of Ardfert Cathedral from 1912 until his appointment as Archdeacon.
