= Conor Loftus =

Mayo Gaelic footballer

Personal information
- Born: 1995 or 1996 (age 30–31) Castlebar, Ireland
- Occupation: Financial advisor
- Height: 1.85 m (6 ft 1 in)

Sport
- Sport: Gaelic football
- Position: Midfield
Club
- Years: Club
- 2013–: Crossmolina Deel Rovers
Club titles
- All-Ireland Titles: 1 Intermediate title
College
- Years: College
- DCU
College titles
- Sigerson titles: 1
Inter-county
- Years: County
- 2016–: Mayo
Inter-county titles
- Connacht titles: 3
- All-Irelands: 1
- NFL: 2

Conor Loftus (born 1995) is an Irish Gaelic footballer who plays for Crossmolina Deel Rovers and Mayo.

== Mayo ==
Loftus was part of the 2013 All-Ireland Minor winning team, and the 2016 All-Ireland Under-21 winning team.

He made his senior debut for Mayo in 2017.

He replaced Andy Moran as a substitute in the 2017 All-Ireland Senior Football Championship final.

Loftus scored a goal against Derry in the 2017 All-Ireland SFC qualifiers after coming on as a substitute in the 63rd minute.

On 26 July 2026, Loftus won the 2026 All-Ireland Football Championship with Mayo, having been brought on as a substitute in the 58th minute.

== Personal life ==
He was engaged to be married to Carrick-on-Shannon native Róisín Cryan; however, she drowned in the River Moy in Ballina before they could be married.
