= John Nallen =

Irish Gaelic footballer (1932–2019)

Personal information
- Native name: Seán Mac Nailín (Irish)
- Born: 1932 Crossmolina, County Mayo, Ireland
- Died: 4 January 2019 (aged 86) Cullies, County Cavan, Ireland
- Occupation: Bank official
- Height: 180 cm (5 ft 11 in)

Sport
- Sport: Gaelic football
- Position: Left corner-forward
Clubs
- Years: Club
- Crossmolina; Tuam Stars; Trim; Castlerahan
Club titles
- Galway titles: 8
Inter-county
- Years: County
- 1951; 1959–1960 1952–1958 1961–1963: Galway; Galway; Mayo; Meath
Inter-county titles
- Connacht titles: 3
- All-Irelands: 0
- NFL: 1

John P. Nallen (1932 – 4 January 2019) was an Irish Gaelic footballer who played for club sides Crossmolina, Tuam Stars, Trim and Castlerahan and at inter-county level with the Mayo, Meath, Galway and Cavan senior teams.

His nephews James and Tom also played for Mayo and Crossmolina.

== Honours ==
Tuam Stars

- Galway Senior Football Championship (8): 1952, 1954, 1955, 1956, 1957, 1958, 1959, 1960

Trim

- Meath Senior Football Championship (1): 1962

Castlerahan

- Cavan Intermediate Football Championship (1): 1966
- Cavan Junior Football Championship (1): 1965

Mayo

- Connacht Senior Football Championship (3): 1955, 1959, 1960
- National Football League (1): 1953-54
- All-Ireland Junior Football Championship (1): 1950
- Connacht Junior Football Championship (1): 1950
- Connacht Minor Football Championship (1): 1950
