= Crossmolina Deel Rovers =

Gaelic games club in County Mayo, Ireland

- Crois Uí Mhaoilíona—Fánaithe na Daoile
- Founded: 1887
- County: Mayo
- Nickname: The Deel Rovers
- Colours: Maroon, White
- Grounds: St Tiernan's Park
- Coordinates: 54°06′17″N 9°18′26″W

Playing kits
Standard colours

Senior Club Championships
| | All Ireland | Connacht champions | Mayo champions |
|---|---|---|---|
| Football: | 1 | 3 | 7 |

Crossmolina Deel Rovers is a Gaelic Athletic Association club based in Crossmolina, County Mayo, Ireland. The club fields Gaelic football teams in competitions organized by the Mayo GAA county board.

== History ==
Crossmolina Dr Crokes GAA was affiliated with the Mayo GAA county board in 1887. In 1906, the name was changed to Deel Rovers, referencing the nearby River Deel. The name of the ground is St Tiernan's Park, for Tigernan of Errew.

Tommy Jordan led the club to the 2000–01 All-Ireland Senior Club Football Championship. Michael Moore and Padraic Syron were selectors and Jarlath Cunningham trained the team.

== Notable players and representatives ==
- Peadar Gardiner
- Conor Loftus
- Mick Loftus
- Seán Lowry
- Ciarán McDonald
- John Maughan
- Liam Moffatt
- Michael Moyles
- James Nallen
- John Nallen
- Tom Nallen
- Stephen Rochford
- Kobe McDonald

== Achievements ==
- All-Ireland Senior Club Football Championship Winners 2001 Runners-Up 2003
- All-Ireland Intermediate Club Football Championship: Winners 2025
- Connacht Senior Club Football Championship Winners 1999, 2000, 2002
- Connacht Intermediate Club Football Championship Winners 2024
- Mayo Senior Football Championship Winners 1949, 1995, 1999, 2000, 2002, 2005, 2006 Runners-Up 1948, 1956, 1957, 1963, 1986, 1988, 1998, 2003
- Mayo Junior Football Championship Winners 1926, 1931, 1947, 1955, 1962, 1975, 2006
- Mayo Intermediate Football Championship Winners 1980 2024
- Mayo Under-21 Football Championship Winners 1992, 1997
