= James Nallen =

Mayo Gaelic footballer

Personal information
- Born: 1973 (age 52–53) Castlebar, Ireland

Sport
- Sport: Gaelic football
- Position: Centre Back
Clubs
- Years: Club
- Crossmolina Deel Rovers; Claregalway
Club titles
- Mayo titles: 6
- Connacht titles: 3
- All-Ireland Titles: 1
Inter-county
Years	County	Apps (scores)
1995–2010	Mayo	132
Inter-county titles
- Connacht titles: 6
- NFL: 1
- All Stars: 2

James Nallen (born Oct 1973 in Castlebar) is an Irish former Gaelic footballer who played for the Mayo county team. He is the team's record appearance holder with 132.

He has worked as Chief Technical Officer at NUI Galway's School of Physics NUI Galway. His brother Tom and their uncle John also played for Mayo and Crossmolina.

== Playing career ==
Nallen played in five All-Ireland Senior Football Championship (SFC) finals, including an All-Ireland SFC final replay against Meath in 1996, and won two All Stars, in 1996 and 2004. He won a National Football League medal in 2001. However, he never won an All-Ireland SFC medal. He retired from inter-county football in 2010.

At club level Nallen won Mayo Senior Football Championship titles in 1995, 1999, 2000, 2002, 2005 and 2006, as well as Connacht Senior Club Football Championship titles in 1999, 2000, 2002, and an All-Ireland Senior Club Football Championship title in 2001.

Nallen has been a selector for Mayo. He spent three seasons working as part of James Horan's management team. He served as "runner" during games.
