= Peadár Gardiner =

Mayo Gaelic footballer

Peadar Gardiner is a former Gaelic footballer who played for Crossmolina Deel Rovers and the Mayo county team.

He had several successes playing for Crossmolina and he vice-captained Mayo. He played in the 2006 All-Ireland Senior Football Championship Final.

He played for NUI Galway.
