= Archdeacon of Aghadoe =

Province of Dublin
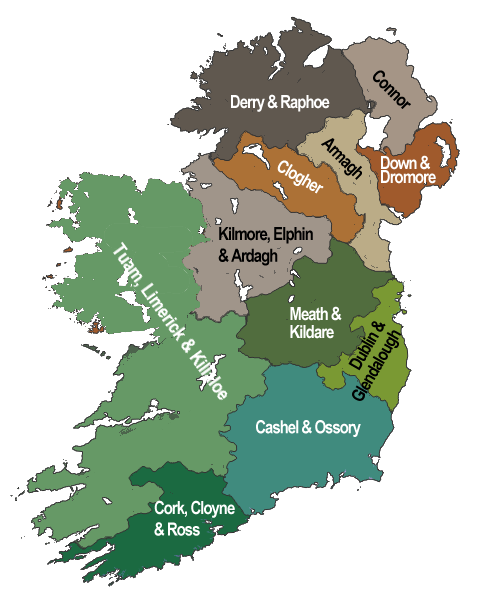
- Church: Church of Ireland
- Metropolitan bishop: Archbishop of Dublin
- Cathedral: Christ Church Cathedral, Dublin
- Dioceses: 5

The Archdeacon of Aghadoe was a senior ecclesiastical officer within the Anglican Diocese of Limerick, Ardfert and Aghadoe from the mid thirteenth century to the early 20th. As such he was responsible for the disciplinary supervision of the clergy within his part of the Diocese of Ardfert (until 1666); and then the combined diocese of Limerick, Ardfert and Aghadoe.

The archdeaconry can trace its history back to Dionysius, who was mentioned as being archdeacon when he was appointed to Bishop of Aghadoe in 1266. Two incumbents went on to hold other high offices:James Bland who became Dean of Ardfert and Alexander Arbuthnot who went on to be Dean of Cloyne then Bishop of Killaloe and Kilfenora. The last discrete incumbent was John George Fahy.
