= Ciarán McDonald =

Irish Gaelic footballer and coach

Personal information
- Native name: Ciarán Mac Dómhnaill (Irish)
- Nickname: Mc D
- Born: 11 January 1975 (age 51) Castlebar, Ireland
- Occupation: Builder
- Height: 6 ft 0 in (183 cm)
- Relative: Kobe McDonald (son)

Sport
- Sport: Gaelic football
- Position: Centre forward
Club
- Years: Club
- 1989–2019: Crossmolina Deel Rovers
Club titles
- Mayo titles: 6
- Connacht titles: 3
- All-Ireland Titles: 1
Inter-county
Years	County	Apps (scores)
1994–2007	Mayo	39 (13–96)
Inter-county titles
- Connacht titles: 4
- All Stars: 1

Ciarán McDonald (born 11 January 1975) is a former Gaelic footballer and coach who played at senior level for the Mayo county team and played club football for Crossmolina Deel Rovers. He played on the Crossmolina team that won the 2001 All-Ireland Senior Club Football Championship, becoming the first Mayo club to win the title.

For Mayo, he played in three All-Ireland Finals and won an All Star Award in 2004.

He represented Ireland in the 2005 International Rules Series, scoring in both tests against Australia.

== Coaching ==
In 2017, McDonald began coaching in Mayo's football academy and from 2019 to 2022, he served as coach/selector for the county's senior football team under the management of James Horan.

== Personal life ==
McDonald's son, Kobe, made his senior debut for Mayo in a league win over Monaghan on 22 February 2026, scoring 1-4.
