= 2026 Roscommon Senior Football Championship =

Gaelic football competition in Roscommon, Ireland for the 2026 season

126th Roscommon Senior Football Championship

Tournament details
- County: Roscommon
- Province: Connacht
- Year: 2026
- Trophy: Fahey Cup
- Sponsor: Hodson Bay Hotel Group
- Date: 31 July - 18 October 2026
- Teams: 12
- Defending champions: St Brigid's

Winners
- Champions: St Brigid's (20th win)
- Manager: Damien Mulligan
- Captain: Ruaidhrí Fallon

Runners-up
- Runners-up: Pádraig Pearses
- Manager: Niall Murray

Promotion/Relegation
- Relegated team(s): St Faithleach's

Other
- Website: Roscommon GAA

The 2026 Roscommon Senior Football Championship is the 126th edition of the Roscommon GAA's premier club Gaelic football tournament for senior clubs in County Roscommon, Ireland. 12 teams compete, with the winner representing Roscommon in the Connacht Senior Club Football Championship. The championship starts with a group stage and then progresses to a knock out stage.

St Brigid's were the defending champions after defeating Padraig Pearses in the 2025 final to win their 19th championship title, and their second in three years.

Strokestown returned to the senior grade after defeating Éire Óg 2-13 to 0-15 in the 2025 I.F.C. final. It was the first time they will play in the S.F.C after they got relegated in 2023 as the reigning champions.

St Dominic's were relegated to the 2026 I.F.C. after losing the relegation final to Western Gaels.

The draw for the group stage of the championship was conducted on 3 April 2026.

== Championship Structure ==
Twelve teams compete in the competition. It begins with a group stage and then progresses to a knockout stage.

=== Group Stage ===
- Four teams are drawn into three groups each, where each team will play each other once.
- The top two teams in each group automatically qualify for the quarter-finals.
- The third place teams in each group qualify for the preliminary quarter-finals.
- The bottom placed teams in each group advance to the relegation playoffs.

=== Relegation Playoff ===
- The two best performing bottom placed finishers in the group stage play each other in a relegation semi-final - the winner secures their senior status.
- The loser plays the worst performing bottom placed finisher in the relegation final - the winner stays up and the loser is relegated to the 2027 Roscommon I.F.C.

=== Preliminary Quarter-Finals ===
- The three third place teams in each group can go down to paths:
  - Two of the third placed teams play each other.
  - One of the third placed teams play the winner of the Divisional Championship (North Roscommon as they are the only divisional team).
- The winners of the preliminary quarter-finals advance to the quarter-finals.

=== Quarter-Finals ===
- The three 1st place teams along with the best 2nd place team are seeded against the other 4 participants.
- The winners progress to the semi-finals.

=== Semi-Finals ===
- The winners progress to the final.

=== Final ===
- The winner is awarded with the Fahey Cup and qualifies for the 2026-27 All-Ireland Senior Club Football Championship.

== Team Changes ==
The following teams have changed division since the 2025 championship season:

=== To S.F.C. ===
Promoted from 2025 Intermediate Football Championship

- Strokestown - (Intermediates Champions)

=== From S.F.C. ===
Relegated to 2026 Intermediate Football Championship

- St Dominic's

== Participating teams ==
The clubs participating in the 2026 Roscommon S.F.C are:

Club	Location	2025 Championship Position	2026 Championship Position	In championship since	Championship Titles (Pre 2026)	Last Championship Title (Pre 2026)
Boyle	Boyle	Quarter-Finalist	Semi-Finalist	2014	2	1927
Castlerea St Kevin's	Castlerea	Relegation Semi-Finalist	Quarter-Finalist	2024	7	2009
Clann na nGael	Drum & Clonown	Semi-Finalist	Relegation Finalist	Never Relegated	21	2018
Elphin	Elphin	Quarter-Finalist	Preliminary Quarter-Finalist	2025	15	1957
Michael Glaveys	Ballinlough, Cloonfad & Granlahan	Quarter-Finalist	Quarter-Finalist	2018	0	—
Oran	Oran	Preliminary Quarter-Finalist	Quarter-Finalist	2021	0	—
Pádraig Pearses	Creagh, Moore & Taughmaconnell	Runners-Up	Runners-Up	2012	3	2024
Roscommon Gaels	Roscommon	Quarter-Finalist	Quarter-Finalist	Never Relegated	11	2004
St Brigid's	Kiltoom & Cam	Champions	Champions	Never Relegated	19	2025
St Faithleach's	Ballyleague	Semi-Finalist	Relegated to 2027 I.F.C.	2022	1	1965
Strokestown	Strokestown	I.F.C. Champions	Semi-Finalist	2026	11	2022
Western Gaels	Ballinagare, Fairymount & Frenchpark	Relegation Finalist	Relegation Semi-Finalist	2005	0	—

== Group Stage ==
=== Group A ===
Advance to quarter-finals Advance to preliminary quarter-finals Advance to relegation play-off

Team	Matches				Score			Pts
Team	Pld	W	D	L	For	Against	Diff	Pts
St Brigid's	3	3	0	0	64	38	+26	6
Strokestown	3	2	0	1	64	60	+4	4
Michael Glaveys	3	1	0	2	50	65	-15	2
Western Gaels	3	0	0	3	43	58	-15	0

==== Round 1 ====
31 July 2026 Round 1	St Brigid's	1-24 (27) – (12) 0-12	Michael Glaveys	Kiltoom
20:00 IST (UTC+1)		(HT: 1-16 – 0-08)
		Report		Referee: Dermot McDermott

1 August 2026 Round 1	Western Gaels	0-20 (20) – (23) 3-14	Strokestown	Frenchpark
19:30 IST (UTC+1)		(HT: 0-08 – 2-08)		Venue: Nash Park
		Report

==== Round 2 ====
15 August 2026 Round 2	Western Gaels	1-07 (10) – (20) 2-14	St Brigid's	Tulsk
18:00 IST (UTC+1)		(HT: 1-03 – 2-07)		Venue: Tulsk Lord Edwrads GAA
		Report		Referee: Aaron Clogher

16 August 2026 Round 2	Strokestown	2-19 (25) – (23) 3-14	Michael Glaveys	Enfield
15:00 IST (UTC+1)		(HT: 1-07 – 0-08)		Venue: St Croan's GAA
		Report		Referee: Padraig Kelly

==== Round 3 ====
30 August 2026 Round 3	Michael Glaveys	0-15 (15) – (13) 0-13	Western Gaels	Ballinlough
16:00 IST (UTC+1)
				Referee: James Murray

30 August 2026 Round 3	Strokestown	0-16 (16) – (17) 0-17	St Brigid's	Strokestown
16:00 IST (UTC+1)				Venue: Tom Shelvin Park
				Referee: Paddy Neilan

=== Group B ===
Advance to quarter-finals Advance to preliminary quarter-finals Advance to relegation play-off

Team	Matches				Score			Pts
Team	Pld	W	D	L	For	Against	Diff	Pts
Pádraig Pearses	3	2	0	1	59	48	+11	4
Boyle	3	2	0	1	58	51	+7	4
Roscommon Gaels	3	1	0	2	49	64	-15	2
Clann na nGael	3	1	0	2	52	55	-3	2

==== Round 1 ====
31 July 2026 Round 1	Pádraig Pearses	2-17 (23) – (12) 0-12	Roscommon Gaels	Woodmount
20:30 IST (UTC+1)		(HT: 0-06 – 0-08)
		Report		Referee: Mark Grehan

1 August 2026 Round 1	Boyle	1-17 (20) – (13) 1-10	Clann na nGael	Boyle
17:00 IST (UTC+1)		(HT: 0-12 – 0-04)		Venue: Abbey Park
		Report		Referee: Paddy Neilan

==== Round 2 ====
14 August 2026 Round 2	Pádraig Pearses	3-15 (24) – (18) 2-12	Boyle	Strokestown
20:00 IST (UTC+1)		(HT: 3-11 – 1-06)		Venue: Tom Shelvin Park
		Report

16 August 2026 Round 2	Clann na nGael	1-18 (21) – (23) 2-17	Roscommon Gaels	Kiltoom
16:00 IST (UTC+1)		(HT: 1-13 – 1-05)		Venue: St Brigid's Sports and Social Centre
		Report		Referee: Dermot Lyons

==== Round 3 ====
28 August 2026 Round 3	Clann na nGael	2-12 (18) – (12) 1-09	Pádraig Pearses	Johnstown
20:00 IST (UTC+1)
				Referee: Mark Grehan

28 August 2026 Round 3	Roscommon Gaels	0-14 (14) – (20) 2-14	Boyle	Roscommon
20:00 IST (UTC+1)				Venue: Lisnamult
				Referee: Dermot Lyons

=== Group C ===
Advance to quarter-finals Advance to preliminary quarter-finals Advance to relegation play-off

Team	Matches				Score			Pts
Team	Pld	W	D	L	For	Against	Diff	Pts
Oran	3	2	1	0	69	43	+26	5
Castlerea St Kevin's	3	1	1	1	52	55	-3	3
Elphin	3	1	0	2	32	60	-28	2
St Faithleach's	3	1	0	2	51	46	+5	2

==== Round 1 ====
31 July 2026 Round 1	Oran	4-16 (28) – (7) 1-04	Elphin	Rockfield
18:30 IST (UTC+1)		(HT: 3-06 – 0-02)
		Report

2 August 2026 Round 1	St Faithleach's	3-14 (23) – (12) 1-09	Castlerea St Kevin's	Ballyleague
19:30 IST (UTC+1)		(HT: 1-04 – 1-06)
		Report		Referee: Padraig Kelly

==== Round 2 ====
15 August 2026 Round 2	Elphin	1-06 (9) – (17) 1-14	Castlerea St Kevin's	Rockfield
18:00 IST (UTC+1)		(HT: 1-01 – 1-09)		Venue: Oran GAA
		Report

16 August 2026 Round 2	St Faithleach's	0-13 (13) – (18) 0-18	Oran	Kilbride
15:00 IST (UTC+1)		(HT: 0-07 – 0-08)		Venue: Kilbride GAA
		Report		Referee: Mark Grehan

==== Round 3 ====
29 August 2026 Round 3	Castlerea St Kevin's	2-17 (23) – (23) 1-20	Oran	Castlerea
18:00 IST (UTC+1)				Venue: O'Rourke Park
				Referee: Ian Monaghan

29 August 2026 Round 3	Elphin	0-16 (16) – (15) 0-15	St Faithleach's	Elphin
18:00 IST (UTC+1)				Venue: Orchard Park
				Referee: Aaron Clogher

== Relegation Playoff ==
The bottom team from each group compete in the relegation playoff. The teams are drawn either into the relegation semi-final or final. The draw for the relegation playoffs was made on 31 August 2026.

=== Relegation Semi-Final ===
5 September 2026 Relegation Semi-Final	St Faithleach's	1-14 (17) – (22) 2-16	Western Gaels	Tulsk
18:00 IST (UTC+1)
				Referee: Ian Monaghan

=== Relegation Final ===
18 September 2026 Relegation Final	St Faithleach's	1-12 (15) – (20) 1-17	Clann na nGael	Kiltoom
20:00 IST (UTC+1)				Venue: St Brigid's Sports and Social Centre

== Knockout Stage ==
=== Bracket ===
Preliminary round
5 September, Castlerea
Elphin	2-08
Michael Glaveys	0-16
6 September, Strokestown
Roscommon Gaels	2-11
Roscommon North	0-04

Quarter-finals
20 September, Elphin
Oran	0-19
Boyle	3-17
19 September, Roscommon
Pádraig Pearses (AET)	3-17
Michael Glaveys	1-13
18 September, Ballyforan
Strokestown	1-15
Castlerea St Kevin's	1-09
20 September, Woodmount
St Brigid's	4-15
Roscommon Gaels	0-18

Semi-finals
3 October, Roscommon
Boyle	2-27
Pádraig Pearses (AET)	5-22
4 October, Roscommon
Strokestown	2-08
St Brigid's	3-22

Final
18 October, Roscommon
Pádraig Pearses	2-16
St Brigid's (AET)	1-25

=== Preliminary Quarter-Finals ===
In the preliminary quarter-finals, two of the 3rd place teams from each group will play each other while the other 3rd place team will play the divisional champions (North Roscommon as they are the only divisional team). The winners progress to the quarter-finals as a non-seeded team.

5 September 2026 Preliminary Quarter-Final	Elphin	2-08 (14) – (16) 0-16	Michael Glaveys	Castlerea
16:00 IST (UTC+1)				Venue: O'Rourke Park
				Referee: Dermot Lyons

6 September 2026 Preliminary Quarter-Final	Roscommon Gaels	2-11 (17) – (4) 0-04	Roscommon North	Strokestown
12:00 IST (UTC+1)				Venue: Tom Shelvin Park

=== Quarter-Finals ===
In the quarter-finals, the three group winners along with the best 2nd placed team in the group stage are seeded and drawn against the non-seeded teams (the two other 2nd placed teams and the preliminary quarter-finals winners). Repeat pairings are avoided. The winners progress to the semi-finals.

18 September 2026 Quarter-Final	Strokestown	1-15 (18) – (12) 1-09	Castlerea St Kevin's	Ballyforan
20:00 IST (UTC+1)

19 September 2026 Quarter-Final	Pádraig Pearses	3-17 (26) – (16) 1-13 (a.e.t.)	Michael Glaveys	Roscommon
15:30 IST (UTC+1)				Venue: Lisnamult

20 September 2026 Quarter-Final	Oran	0-19 (19) – (26) 3-17	Boyle	Elphin
13:30 IST (UTC+1)				Venue: Orchard Park

20 September 2026 Quarter-Final	St Brigid's	4-15 (27) – (18) 0-18	Roscommon Gaels	Woodmount
16:30 IST (UTC+1)
	Pts: Ben O'Carroll 1-5 (1f), Conor Hand 1-3, Brian Stack 1-0, Charlie O'Carroll 1-0, Bobby Nugent 0-3, Robbie Dolan 0-2, Ciarán Sugrue 0-1, Ronan Stack 0-1	Report	Pts: Rory McCarthy 0-7 (6f), Peter Gillooly 0-3, Sam Hannon 0-2 (tp), John McGuinness 0-2, Tim Lambe 0-1, Eoghan McCarthy 0-1, Senan Lambe 0-1, Michael Gillooly 0-1

=== Semi-Finals ===
In the semi-finals, the quarter-final winners are drawn against one another. The winners progress to the county final.

3 October 2026 Semi-Final	Boyle	2-27 (33) – (37) 5-22 (a.e.t.)	Pádraig Pearses	Roscommon
16:30 IST (UTC+1)				Venue: Dr Hyde Park

4 October 2026 Semi-Final	Strokestown	2-08 (14) – (31) 3-22	St Brigid's	Roscommon
15:30 IST (UTC+1)				Venue: Dr Hyde Park

=== Final ===
18 October 2026
14:00 IST (UTC+1)
Final

Report

Pádraig Pearses	2-16 (22) – (28) 1-25 (a.e.t.)	St Brigid's
(HT: 0-08 – 0-09) (FT: 1-15 – 0-18)
Pts: Eoin Colleran 0-5 (2tp), Paul Carey 0-4 (1tpf, 2f), Declan Kenny 1-1 (1pen), David Murray 1-0, Lorcán Daly 0-2, Tom Butler 0-2 (tp), Jack Tumulty 0-1, Hubert Darcy 0-1		Pts: Conor Hand 1-5 (2tp), Ben O'Carroll 0-4 (1f), Shane Cunnane 0-4 (1tpf, 1tp), Charlie O'Carroll 0-4 (1tp), Bobby Nugent 0-2 (tp), Brian Derwin 0-1, Ruaidhrí Fallon 0-1, Eddie Nolan 0-1, Senan Kilbride 0-1, Pearse Frost 0-1, Brian Stack 0-1

Dr Hyde Park, Roscommon

Pádraig Pearses	St Brigid's

GK	1	Paul Whelan
FB	2	Mark Richardson	(substituted off) 67'
FB	3	Caelim Keogh	(substituted off) 69'
FB	4	Jack Downey
HB	5	Jack Nevin	(substituted off) 53' (substituted on) 69'
HB	6	Ronan Daly
HB	7	David Murray
MF	8	Conor Harley	(substituted off) 59'
MF	9	Declan Kenny (c)
HF	10	Keelan Kelly	(substituted off) 59' (substituted on) 67'
HF	11	Lorcán Daly	(substituted off) 58' (substituted on) 80'
HF	12	Adam McGreal	(substituted off) 58'
FF	13	Eoin Colleran
FF	14	Jack Tumulty
FF	15	Paul Carey	(substituted off) 80'
Substitutes:
	16	David Donnellan
	17	Tom Butler	(substituted on) 59'
	18	Thomas Carey
	19	Darragh Colleran
	20	Jason Cunningham
	21	Hubert Darcy	(substituted on) 58'
	22	Gavin Downey
	23	Ross Glynn
	24	Darragh Glynn-Desmond
	25	Eoin McManus
	26	Conor Lohan	(substituted on) 53'
	27	Charles Nevin
	28	John Price	(substituted on) 58'
	29	Luke Walsh
	30	Niall Daly	(substituted on) 59'
Manager:
Niall Murray

GK	1	Conor Carroll
FB	19	Paul McGrath	(substituted off) 42' (substituted on) 80'
FB	3	Pearse Frost
FB	4	Micheál Sugrue	(substituted off) 70'
HB	5	Robbie Dolan
HB	6	Brian Stack
HB	7	Ruaidhrí Fallon (c)
MF	8	Mark Daly	(substituted off) 58'
MF	9	Shane Cunnane
HF	10	Brian O'Hara Duggan	(substituted off) 35' (substituted on) 60'
HF	11	Conor Hand	(substituted off) 80'
HF	12	Bobby Nugent	(substituted off) 67'
FF	13	Ben O'Carroll
FF	14	Ciarán Sugrue	(substituted off) 60' (substituted on) 67'
FF	25	Brian Derwin	(substituted off) 46'
Substitutes:
	16	Evan Gallagher
	17	Ronan Stack	(substituted on) 42'
	18	Charlie O'Carroll	(substituted on) 46'
	2	Ruairí Smith	(substituted on) 70'
	20	Ciarán Quinn
	21	Daniel Meeley
	22	Eoghan Derwin
	23	Adam Lennon
	24	Eamonn Cunnane
	15	Senan Kilbride	(substituted on) 58'
	26	Brian Nestor
	27	John Cunningham
	28	Eddie Nolan	(substituted on) 35'
	29	Cathal Dolan
	30	Alan Daly
Manager:
Damien Mulligan
