= 2016 Roscommon Senior Football Championship =

Roscommon S.F.C.
- Season: 2016
- Champions: St. Brigid's (15th S.F.C. Title)
- Relegated: Michael Glavey's
- Connacht SCFC: St. Brigid's
- All Ireland SCFC: n/a
- Winning Captain: Darragh Donnelly and Cathal McHugh
- Man of the Match: Ian Kilbride

The 2016 Roscommon Senior Football Championship is the 116th edition of the Roscommon GAA's premier club Gaelic football tournament for senior graded teams in County Roscommon, Ireland. The tournament consists of 12 teams, with the winner going on to represent Roscommon in the Connacht Senior Club Football Championship. The championship starts with a seeded group stage and then progresses to a knock out stage.

Clann na nGael were the defending champions after they defeated Pádraig Pearse's in the previous years final; however, they failed to make it past the group stages in the defense of their title.

This was Michael Glavey's made their return to the senior grade after an exodus of over 30 years; however, they were relegated back to the Intermediate grade for 2017 after losing the Relegation Final to St. Croan's.

On 23 October 2016, St. Brigid's claimed their 16th S.F.C. title when defeating neighbours Pádraig Pearse's by 2-14 to 2-7 in the final in Kiltoom.

== Team changes ==
The following teams have changed division since the 2015 championship season.

=== To S.F.C. ===
Promoted from I.F.C.

- Michael Glavey's – (Intermediate Champions)

=== From S.F.C. ===
Relegated to I.F.C.

- Kilmore

== Group stage ==
All 12 teams enter the competition at this stage.

The competition split into two groups, based on their performance in the 2015 Group stages. Group 1 consists of teams who reached the Quarter-Finals last year or better. Group 2 consists of two bottom placed finishers in Group 1 last year as well as 3rd and 4th placed in Group 2 last year, the 2015 Relegation Playoff winners and the 2015 Intermediate champions.

The top 2 teams in Group 1 go into the Semi-Finals, where they await the winners of the Quarter-Finals, which are composed of the 3rd and 4th placed teams in Group 1 along with the top 2 finishers in Group 2. The bottom 2 teams in Group 2 will enter a Relegation Playoff.

=== Group 1 ===
Team	Pld	W	L	D	PF	PA	PD	Pts
Pádraig Pearse's	5	3	1	1	69	60	+9	7
St. Brigid's	5	3	2	0	86	53	+33	6
Boyle	5	3	2	0	87	94	-7	6
Roscommon Gaels	5	2	2	1	62	61	+1	5
Clann na nGael	5	2	3	0	65	62	+3	4
Castlerea St. Kevin's	5	1	4	0	40	79	-39	2

Round 1

- Roscommon Gaels 0-10, 0-8 Clann na nGael, 7/5/2016,
- Pádraig Pearse's 0-14, 0-9 St. Brigid's, 8/5/2016,
- Boyle 1-12, 1-7 Castlerea St. Kevin's, 8/5/2016,

Round 2

- St. Brigid's 5-13, 1-9 Boyle, 17/6/2016,
- Clann na nGael 0-16, 0-7 Pádraig Pearses, 18/6/2016,
- Roscommon Gaels 0-11, 0-7 Castlerea St. Kevin's, 19/6/2016,

Round 3

- Pádraig Pearses 3-9, 1-12 Boyle, 7/8/2016,
- Castlerea St. Kevin's 1-8, 1-6 Clann na nGael, 7/8/2016,
- St. Brigid's 0-12, 1-6 Roscommon Gaels, 7/8/2016,

Round 4

- Boyle 3-11, 3-9 Roscommon Gaels, 14/8/2016,
- Pádraig Pearses 1-13, 0-6 Castlerea St. Kevin's, 14/8/2016,
- Clann na nGael 0-12, 1-6 St. Brigid's, 14/8/2016,

Round 5

- Boyle 4-13, 2-14 Clann na nGael, 27/8/2016,
- Pádraig Pearses 1-11, 1-11 Roscommon Gaels, 27/8/2016,
- St. Brigid's 4-16, 0-6 Castlerea St. Kevin's, 27/8/2016,

=== Group 2 ===
Team	Pld	W	L	D	PF	PA	PD	Pts
Western Gaels	5	4	1	0	97	63	+34	8
St. Faithleach's	5	3	2	0	85	85	+0	6
Strokestown	5	3	2	0	85	70	+15	6
Elphin	5	2	2	1	79	88	-9	5
St. Croan's	5	1	3	1	66	73	-7	3
Michael Glavey's	5	1	4	0	56	89	-33	2

Round 1

- Western Gaels 1-13, 0-8 Strokestown, 7/5/2016,
- St. Croan's 0-13, 1-3 Michael Glavey's, 7/5/2016,
- St. Faithleach's 2-14, 0-12 Elphin, 8/5/2016,

Round 2

- Michael Glavey's 3-10, 1-12 St. Faithleach's, 18/6/2016,
- Strokestown 3-16, 4-10 Elphin, 19/6/2016,
- Western Gaels 2-11, 1-9 St. Croan's, 19/6/2016,

Round 3

- Elphin 1-9, 0-11 Michael Glavey's, 6/8/2016,
- Strokestown 0-13, 1-6 St. Croan's, 7/8/2016,
- Western Gaels 5-13, 0-14 St. Faithleach's, 7/8/2016,

Round 4

- St. Faithleach's 3-12, 0-16 St. Croan's, 13/8/2016,
- Strokestown 3-20, 1-5 Michael Glaveys, 14/8/2016,
- Elphin 2-11, 0-16 Western Gaels, 14/8/2016,

Round 5

- Western Gaels 0-20, 2-6 Michael Glavey's, 28/8/2016,
- St. Croan's 0-16, 2-10 Elphin, 28/8/2016,
- St. Faithleach's 2-9, 0-10 Strokestown, 28/8/2016,

== Knock-Out Stages ==
=== Relegation Final ===
- St. Croan's 0-13, 0-11 Michael Glavey's, Enfield, 11/9/2016,

=== Finals ===
Quarter-Finals
Roscommon Gaels	2-5
Western Gaels	0-19
Boyle	3-15
St. Faithleach's	2-8

Semi-Finals
Pádraig Pearse's	0-13
Western Gaels	0-10
St. Brigid's	4-10
Boyle	2-8

Final
Pádraig Pearse's	2-7
St. Brigid's	2-14

Quarter-Finals:

- Western Gaels 0-19, 2-5 Roscommon Gaels, Enfield, 10/9/2016,
- Boyle 3-15, 2-8 St. Faithleach's, Kilglass, 11/9/2016,

Semi-Finals:

2 October 2016; 1:30pm Semi-Final	Pádraig Pearse's	0-13 – 0-10	Western Gaels	Kiltoom; Referee: Paddy Neilan; Man of the Match: Conor Daly
2 October 2016; 1:30pm Semi-Final	Aaron Feehily (0-4f) and Hubert Darcy (0-3f) 0-4 each, Niall Daly and Ronan Daly (0-1f), Conor Payne 0-1	Report	Niall Higgins 0-3f, Ciaran Cafferkey, Kevin Higgins, Cathal Cregg 0-2 each, John Duffy 0-1	Kiltoom; Referee: Paddy Neilan; Man of the Match: Conor Daly

2 October 2016; 3:30pm Semi-Final	St. Brigid's	4-10 – 2-8	Boyle	Strokestown; Referee: Gerry Carmody; Man of the Match: Senan Kilbride
2 October 2016; 3:30pm Semi-Final	Brian Stack and Senan Kilbride 1-1 each, Karol Mannion and Jack McDonnell 1-0, Cathal McHugh 0-2, Ian Kilbride, Eoin Sheehy, Garvan Dolan, Darren Dolan, David Cunniffe, John Cunningham 0-1 each	Report	Cian McKeon 1-2 (0-1f), Roch Hanmore 1-0, Sean Purcell 0-2, Dylan East, Tadgh McKenna, Enda Smith, Darren O'Connor 0-1 each	Strokestown; Referee: Gerry Carmody; Man of the Match: Senan Kilbride

Final:

23 October 2016; 3:30pm Final	St. Brigid's	2-14 – 2-7	Pádraig Pearse's	Kiltoom, Roscommon; Referee: Paul Daly (Strokestown); Man of the Match: Ian Kilbride
23 October 2016; 3:30pm Final	Darragh Donnelly and Ian Kilbride 1-0 each, Darren Dolan and Karol Mannion (0-2f) 0-3 each, Garvan Dolan 0-2, Brian Stack 0-2, Darragh Sheehy, Conor Murray, Cathal McHugh, David Cunniffe 0-1 each	Report	Seán Fahy 1-3 (0-2f), Hubert Darcy 1-2 (0-2f), Tom Butler, Shane Dolan 0-1 each	Kiltoom, Roscommon; Referee: Paul Daly (Strokestown); Man of the Match: Ian Kilbride
