= 2017 Roscommon Senior Football Championship =

Roscommon S.F.C.
- Season: 2017
- Champions: St. Brigid's (16th title)
- Relegated: Kilmore
- All Ireland SCFC: ???
- Winning Captain: Peter Domican and Garvan Dolan
- Man Of The Match: Peter Domican
- Winning Manager: Frankie Dolan
- Connacht SCFC: ???

The 2017 Roscommon Senior Football Championship is the 117th edition of Roscommon GAA's premier Gaelic football tournament for senior graded clubs in County Roscommon, Ireland. The tournament consists of 12 teams, with the winner representing Roscommon in the Connacht Senior Club Football Championship.

The championship starts with a seeded group stage and then progresses to a knock out stage.

St. Brigid's were the defending champions after they defeated Pádraig Pearse's in the previous years final, and they successfully defended their title to claim a "2-in-a-row" of championships and their 16th overall when defeating Roscommon Gaels 3-13 to 3-7 in the final at Dr. Hyde Park.

Kilmore bounced straight back to the top flight for this season from the Intermediate ranks after relegation in 2015, through claiming the 2016 I.F.C. title. However, they were relegated back to the middle tier for 2018 after losing the Relegation Final to Castlerea St. Kevin's.

== Team changes ==
The following teams have changed division since the 2016 championship season.

=== To S.F.C. ===
Promoted from 2016 Roscommon Intermediate Football Championship

- Kilmore – (Intermediate Champions)

=== From S.F.C. ===
Relegated to 2017 Roscommon Intermediate Football Championship

- Michael Glavey's

== Group stage ==
All 12 teams enter the competition at this stage.

The competition split into two groups, based on their performance in the 2016 Group stages. Group 1 consists of teams who reached the quarter-finals last year or better. Group 2 consists of two bottom placed finishers in Group 1 last year as well as 3rd and 4th placed in Group 2 last year, the 2016 Relegation Playoff winners and the 2016 Intermediate champions.

The top 2 teams in Group 1 go into the semi-finals, where they await the winners of the quarter-finals, which are composed of the 3rd and 4th placed teams in Group 1 along with the top 2 finishers in Group 2. The bottom 2 teams in Group 2 will enter a Relegation Playoff.

=== Group 1 ===
==== Group 1 Table ====
Team	Pld	W	L	D	PF	PA	PD	Pts
Roscommon Gaels	5	4	1	0	75	83	-8	8
St. Brigid's	5	3	2	0	107	82	+25	6
Western Gaels	5	2	3	0	90	75	+15	6
Boyle	5	3	2	0	85	92	-7	6
St. Faithleach's	5	2	3	0	88	90	-2	4
Pádraig Pearse's	5	0	5	0	62	85	-23	0

==== Group 1 Round 1 ====
5/6/17; 19:30	Roscommon Gaels	3-13 – 2-11	St. Faithleach's	Ballyleague; Referee: Aaron Clogher; Man of the Match: Brian O'Gara
5/6/17; 19:30	Cian Connolly 0-5 (0-1f, 2 '45), Mark Nally 1-1, Ronan Gleeson and John McManus 1-0 each, Brian Kelly and Kieran Kilcline 0-2 each, David O'Gara, James McDermott, James O'Gara 0-1 each		Kevin Farrell and Daniel Foley 1-0 each, Dave Rooney (1 '45) and Diarmuid Murtagh (0-3f) 0-3 each, Ciaran Murtagh 0-2, Brian Murtagh, Darragh Hussey, Aidan Dooney	Ballyleague; Referee: Aaron Clogher; Man of the Match: Brian O'Gara

5/7/17; 14:00	Western Gaels	1-23 – 2-8	Boyle	Strokestown; Referee: Gerry Carmody
5/7/17; 14:00	Kevin Higgins 1-5, Derek Moran 0-7f, Finbarr Cregg 0-3, John Duffy, Cathal Cregg, Tommy Gill 0-2 each, Sean McDermott and Niall Higgins 0-1 each		Donie Smith 1-6 (0-1f) and Cian McKeon 1-2	Strokestown; Referee: Gerry Carmody

5/7/17; 14:00	St. Brigid's	1-16 – 0-14	Pádraig Pearses	Johnstown; Referee: Anthony Naughton; Man of the Match: Garvan Dolan
5/7/17; 14:00	Senan Kilbride 0-4 (0-3f), Garvan Dolan (0-1f) and Jack McDonnell (0-1f) 0-3 each, Brian Stack 1-0, David Cunniffe 0-2, Eoin Sheehy, Padraig Kelly, Gavin Byrne, Darragh Donnelly 0-1 each	Report	Hubert Darcy 0-6 (0-3f), Sean Fahy 0-3 (0-1f), Conor Payne 0-2, Shane Carty and Ronan Daly 0-1 each	Johnstown; Referee: Anthony Naughton; Man of the Match: Garvan Dolan

==== Group 1 Round 2 ====
5/12/17; 20:00	Roscommon Gaels	1-15 – 1-8	Ballyleague	Kilbride; Referee: Kevin Naughton; Man of the Match: Cian Connolly
5/12/17; 20:00	Cian Connolly 0-5 (0-3f), Kieran Kilcline and Brian Kelly 0-3 each, Brian O'Gara 1-0, Enda Lannon 0-2, Ronan Gleeson and Mark Nally 0-1 each		Donie Smith 0-6 (0-3f, 1 '45), Evan McGrath 1-0, Cian McKeon 0-2 (0-1f)	Kilbride; Referee: Kevin Naughton; Man of the Match: Cian Connolly

5/13/17; 19:15	Western Gaels	2-14 – 0-12	Pádraig Pearses	Pairc an Phiarsaigh; Referee: Paddy Neilan; Man of the Match: Ciaran Cafferkey
5/13/17; 19:15	Kevin Higgins 1-3, Finbarr Cregg 1-2, Derek Moran 0-3f, Sean Conroy, Ciaran Cafferkey, Oisin Ward, Cathal Cregg, Niall Higgins, Tommy Gill 0-1 each		Sean Fahy 0-4 (0-3f), Aaron Fehily, Daniel Glynn, Hubert Darcy (0-1f) 0-2 each, Shane Carty and Leon Fehily (0-1f) 0-1 each	Pairc an Phiarsaigh; Referee: Paddy Neilan; Man of the Match: Ciaran Cafferkey

5/14/17; 15:45	St. Brigid's	4-8 – 2-11	St. Faithleach's	Kiltoom
5/14/17; 15:45	Senan Kilbride 1-3 (0-3f), Mark Daly 1-0, David Cunniffe 1-0 pen, Darragh Donnelly 1-0, Garvan Dolan 0-3f, Jack McDonnell and Cathal McHugh 0-1 each		Diarmuid Murtagh 1-3, Ciaran Murtagh 0-4, Darragh Hussey 1-0, Jonathan Hussey 0-2, David Rooney and Aidan Dooney 0-1 each	Kiltoom

==== Group 1 Round 3 ====
8/19/17; 17:30	Boyle	3-15 – 3-9	St. Brigid's	O'Rourke Park; Referee: Gerry Carmody
8/19/17; 17:30	Donie Smith 0-7, Cian McKeon 1-3, Enda Smith 1-1, David Callaghan 1-0, Evan McGrath, Tadgh McKenna, Conor Flanagan, Darren O'Connor 0-1 each		Jack McDonnell 0-4, Brian Stack 1-1, Peter Domican and David Cunniffe 1-0 each, Padraig Kelly 0-3, Garvan Dolan 0-1	O'Rourke Park; Referee: Gerry Carmody

8/20/17; 13:00	Roscommon Gaels	1-10 – 0-11	Western Gaels	Orchard Park; Referee: Paul Daly; Man of the Match: Mark Healy
8/20/17; 13:00	Mark Healy 1-4 (0-1f) and Cian Connolly 0-6 (0-3f, 1 '45)		Finbar Cregg 0-6 (0-4f), Derek Moran 0-3f, John Duffy and James McDonnell 0-1 each	Orchard Park; Referee: Paul Daly; Man of the Match: Mark Healy

8/20/17; 14:45	St. Faithleach's	1-13 – 0-14	Pádraig Pearses	Athleague; Referee: P McTiernan
8/20/17; 14:45	Diarmuid Murtagh 1-1, Connell Kennelly, Ciaran Murtagh, Aidan Dooney, David Rooney 0-2 each, Stephen Ormsby, C Quinn, Brian Murtagh, Jonathan Hussey 0-1 each		Sean Fahy 0-4, Hubert Darcy 0-3, David Grehan 0-2, Shane Dolan, Shane Carty, Daniel Glynn, Aaron Fehily, Emmet Kelly 0-1 each	Athleague; Referee: P McTiernan

==== Group 1 Round 4 ====
8/26/17; 17:30	Boyle	2-14 – 1-16	St. Faithleach's	Kilglass

8/26/17; 13:00	Western Gaels	1-16 – 1-14	St. Brigid's	Western Gaels

8/27/17; 19:00	Roscommon Gaels	0-14 – 0-11	Pádraig Pearses	Kiltoom

==== Group 1 Round 5 ====
9/9/17	Boyle	2-10 – 1-8	Pádraig Pearses

9/9/17	St. Faithleach's	1-16 – 1-11	Western Gaels

9/9/17	St. Brigid's	5-18 – 0-8	Roscommon Gaels

=== Group 2 ===
==== Group 2 Table ====
Team	Pld	W	L	D	PF	PA	PD	Pts
Strokestown	5	4	0	1	96	53	+43	9
Clann na nGael	5	4	0	1	98	65	+33	9
Elphin	5	3	2	0	79	70	+9	6
St. Croan's	5	2	3	0	70	91	-21	4
Kilmore	4	0	4	0	47	76	-29	0
Castlerea St. Kevin's	4	0	4	0	56	91	-35	0

==== Group 2 Round 1 ====
5/6/17; 19:30	Elphin	1-11 – 1-8	St. Croan's	Enfield; Referee: P McTiernan
5/6/17; 19:30	Frankie Cregg 1-5 (0-3f), Brian Higgins and Gerry Cregg 0-2 each, Fintan Cregg (0-1f) and Aidan Murray 0-1 each		Kevin Smyth 0-4f, Ross Timothy 1-0, Gerard Connaughton, Keith Keenan, James Connaughton, Shane Smyth 0-1 each	Enfield; Referee: P McTiernan

5/6/17; 15:45	Strokestown	2-19 – 1-8	Castlerea St. Kevin's	Strokestown; Referee: Declan Hunt
5/6/17; 15:45	Colin Compton 1-2, Kevin Finn 0-4 (0-2f), Keith Murphy 1-0, Daniel Rogers 0-3, Thomas Corcoran and Cathal Compton 0-2, Sean Mullooly, Ruairi Molloy, M Fallon, Ian Rogers, G Collins, Kevin Shiel 0-1 each		Ger Heneghan 0-5 (0-3f), Christy Dineen 1-1, Eddie Creaton and Niall Connaughton 0-1 each	Strokestown; Referee: Declan Hunt

5/21/17; 15:45	Clann na nGael	2-17 – 0-10	Kilmore	Johnstown; Referee: Ollie Kelly; Man of the Match: Donie Shine
5/21/17; 15:45	Donie Shine 1-8 (0-7f), Johnny Dunning 1-2, Cathal Shine and Ross Naughton 0-2 each, Emmett Kenny, Cathal Callinan, Matt Nally 0-1 each		Paul Garvey 0-5 (0-1f), Ray Caslin 0-3, John Gannon and Derek Connellan (0-1f) 0-1 each	Johnstown; Referee: Ollie Kelly; Man of the Match: Donie Shine

==== Group 2 Round 2 ====
5/13/17; 18:00	Clann na nGael	6-10 – 1-9	St. Croan's	Kiltoom; Referee: Ollie Kelly; Man of the Match: Stephen Flynn
5/13/17; 18:00	Jamie Fahy 2-2, Donie Shine 1-5 (0-4f, 1 '45), Fergal Lennon 1-0, Cian McManus 1-0, Ciaran Lennon 1-0, David Connaughton, Ross Naughton, Johnny Dunning 0-1 each		Ross Timothy 1-0, Shane Smyth and Kevin Smyth (0-3f) 0-3 each, Maurice Connaughton, Mike Holland, Jason Egan 0-1 each	Kiltoom; Referee: Ollie Kelly; Man of the Match: Stephen Flynn

5/14/17; 15:45	Elphin	6-8 – 1-14	Castlerea St. Kevin's	Enfield; Referee: Gerry Carmody; Man of the Match: Gerry Cregg
5/14/17; 15:45	Gerry Cregg 3-2, Frankie Cregg 2-2, Fintan Cregg 1-3, Ronan Beirne (1 '45) and Conor Lenehan 0-1 each		Ger Heneghan 0-7 (0-2f, 1 '45), Darren McDermott 1-4, Christy Dineen 0-3f	Enfield; Referee: Gerry Carmody; Man of the Match: Gerry Cregg

5/14/17; 15:45	Strokestown	2-16 – 0-11	Kilmore	Kilglass
5/14/17; 15:45	Colin Compton and Paddy Brogan 1-0 each		Derek Connellan 0-11	Kilglass

==== Group 2 Round 3 ====
8/19/17; 19:15	Clann na nGael	1-14 – 1-13	Castlerea St. Kevin's	O'Rourke Park; Referee: Brendan Beirne
8/19/17; 19:15	Donie Shine 1-9 (1-0 pen, 0-5f, 2 '45), Ross Naughton 0-2, Enda Kenny, Cathal Shine, Jamie Fahy 0-1 each		Ger Heneghan 0-8 (0-6f), Nathan Bligh 1-0, Darren McDermott 0-3, Ronan Raftery and Ronan Curran 0-1 each	O'Rourke Park; Referee: Brendan Beirne

8/20/17; 14:45	Strokestown	2-7 – 0-10	Elphin	Orchard Park; Referee: Declan Hunt
8/20/17; 14:45	Diarmuid McGann 1-1, Paddy Brogan 1-0, Michael Fallon and Colin Compton 0-2 each, Cathal Compton and Ian Rogers 0-1 each		Fintan Cregg 0-7, Frankie Cregg 0-2, Gerry Cregg 0-1	Orchard Park; Referee: Declan Hunt

8/20/17; 18:00	St. Croan's	2-10 – 0-14	Kilmore	Kilmore; Referee: Vivian Hardiman
8/20/17; 18:00	Ross Timothy 0-3, Shane Smyth and Dan Malone 1-0 each, Keith Keenan, Maurice Connaughton, Mike Holland, James Connaughton, Kevin Smith, Keith Muldoon, Alan Hurley 0-1 each		Paul Garvey 0-9, Derek Connellan 0-4, Gerry Connellan 0-1	Kilmore; Referee: Vivian Hardiman

==== Group 2 Round 4 ====
8/26/17; 17:30	St. Croan's	5-8 – 0-12	Castlerea St. Kevin's	Dr. Hyde Park

8/26/17; 19:15	Clann na nGael	0-13 – 0-13	Strokestown	Dr. Hyde Park

8/26/17; 19:15	Elphin	0-15 – 1-9	Kilmore	Kilglass

==== Group 2 Round 5 ====
10 September 2017; 2:00 pm	Clann na nGael	1-14 – 2-8	Elphin	Kiltoom

10 September 2017; 2:00pm	Castlrea St. Kevin's	1-11 – 0-7	Kilmore	Abbey Park

9 September 2017; 6:30 pm	Strokestown	2-17 – 0-8	St. Croan's	Kilbride

== Knock-Out Stages ==
=== Relegation Final ===
- Castlerea St. Kevin's 1-11, 0-7 Kilmore, Boyle, 10/9/2017,

=== Finals ===
Quarter-Finals
Boyle	2-11
Strokestown	0-15
Western Gaels	5-11
Clan na nGael	2-15

Semi-Finals
Roscommon Gaels	0-16
Boyle	0-10
St. Brigids	2-6
Western Gaels	0-10

Final
Roscommon Gaels	3-7
St. Brigids	3-13

== Quarter-finals ==
16 September 2017; 18:00	Boyle	2-11 – 0-15	Strokestown	Dr. Hyde Park; Referee: Kevin Naughton; Man of the Match: Cian McKeon
16 September 2017; 18:00	Donie Smith (0-2f, 2 '45) and Cian McKeon (0-1f) 0-5 each, Sean Purcell and Enda Smith 1-0, Mark O'Donoghue 0-1		Diarmuid McGann 0-5 (0-3f), Kevin Finn and Colin Compton (0-1f) 0-2 each, Keelan Beirne, Ruaidhri Molloy, Cathal Compton, Ian Rogers, Keith Murphy, Luke Kelly 0-1 each	Dr. Hyde Park; Referee: Kevin Naughton; Man of the Match: Cian McKeon

16 September 2017; 20:00	Western Gaels	5-11 – 2-15	Clann na nGael	Kiltoom; Referee: Ollie Kelly; Man of the Match: Cathal Cregg
16 September 2017; 20:00	Cathal Cregg 3-2, Finbar Cregg 0-5 (0-2f), Niall Higgins 1-1, Tommy Gill 1-0, Ciaran Cafferky 0-2, Sean Ryan 0-1		Donie Shine 1-7 (1-0 pen, 0-5f), Cathal Shine 1-1, Cathal Callinan 0-2, Emmett Kenny, Graham Pettit, Ciaran Lennon, Ruardhi McManus, Damien Duff 0-1 each	Kiltoom; Referee: Ollie Kelly; Man of the Match: Cathal Cregg

== Semi-finals ==
1 October 2017; 14:00	Roscommon Gaels	0-16 – 0-10	Boyle	Dr. Hyde Park; Attendance: 1,500; Referee: Paul Daly; Man of the Match: David O'Gara
1 October 2017; 14:00	Cian Connolly 0-5 (0-4f), David O'Gara 0-3, Ciaran Kilcline, Scott Oates, Mark Nally 0-2 each, James O'Gara and Richard Hughes 0-1 each		Donie Smith (0-1f) and Cian McKeon (0-2f) 0-3 each, Enda Smith 0-2 (0-1f), Tadgh McKenna and Darren O'Connor 0-1 each	Dr. Hyde Park; Attendance: 1,500; Referee: Paul Daly; Man of the Match: David O'Gara

1 October 2017; 15:45	St. Brigid's	2-6 – 0-10	Western Gaels	Dr. Hyde Park; Attendance: 1,500; Referee: Aaron Clogher; Man of the Match: Padraig Kelly
1 October 2017; 15:45	Senan Kilbride 1-2 (0-2f), Cathal McHugh 0-3 (0-1f), Brian Stack 1-0, Ronan Stack 0-1		Finbar Cregg 0-6f, Aidan Dowd, Niall Higgins, Kevin Higgins, Cathal Cregg 0-1 each	Dr. Hyde Park; Attendance: 1,500; Referee: Aaron Clogher; Man of the Match: Padraig Kelly

== Final ==
22 October 2017; 4:00 pm Final	St. Brigid's	3-13 – 3-7	Roscommon Gaels	Dr. Hyde Park, Roscommon; Attendance: 1,635; Referee: Brendan Healy (St. Faithleach's); Man of the Match: Peter Domican
22 October 2017; 4:00 pm Final	Brian Stack 1-1, Cathal McHugh (0-3f) and Senan Kilbride (0-3f) 0-4 each, Eddie Nolan and Conor Murray 1-0 each, Darragh Sheehy, Darren Dolan, Padraig Kelly, Jack McDonnell 0-1 each	Report	Cian Connolly 1-4 (1-0 pen, 0-4f), Mark Healy and James O'Gara 1-0 each, Richard Hughes, Ronan Gleeson 0-1	Dr. Hyde Park, Roscommon; Attendance: 1,635; Referee: Brendan Healy (St. Faithleach's); Man of the Match: Peter Domican

== Championship statistics ==
=== Miscellaneous ===
- Roscommon Gaels qualify for the final for the first time since 2004.
