= 2018 Roscommon Senior Football Championship =

Roscommon S.F.C.
- Season: 2018
- Champions: ???
- Relegated: ???
- All Ireland SCFC: ???
- Winning Captain: ???
- Man Of The Match: ???
- Winning Manager: ???
- Connacht SCFC: ???

The 2018 Roscommon Senior Football Championship is the 118th edition of Roscommon GAA's premier Gaelic football tournament for senior graded clubs in County Roscommon, Ireland. The tournament consists of 12 teams, with the winner representing Roscommon in the Connacht Senior Club Football Championship.

The championship starts with a seeded group stage and then progresses to a knock out stage.

St. Brigid's were the defending champions for the second season running after they defeated Roscommon Gaels in the previous years final.

Michael Glavey's (as Connacht I.C.F.C. champions and All-Ireland I.C.F.C. runners-up bounced straight back to the top flight for this season from the Intermediate ranks after relegation in 2016, through claiming the 2017 I.F.C. title.

== Team changes ==
The following teams have changed division since the 2017 championship season.

=== To S.F.C. ===
Promoted from 2017 Roscommon I.F.C.

- Michael Glavey's - (Intermediate Champions)

=== From S.F.C. ===
Relegated to 2018 Roscommon I.F.C.

- Kilmore

== Group stage ==
All 12 teams enter the competition at this stage.

The competition split into two groups, based on their performance in the 2017 Group stages. Group 1 consists of teams who reached the quarter-finals last year or better. Group 2 consists of two bottom placed finishers in Group 1 last year as well as 3rd and 4th placed in Group 2 last year, the 2017 Relegation Playoff winners and the 2016 Intermediate champions.

The top 2 teams in Group 1 go into the semi-finals, where they await the winners of the quarter-finals, which are composed of the 3rd and 4th placed teams in Group 1 along with the top 2 finishers in Group 2. The bottom 2 teams in Group 2 will enter a Relegation Playoff.

=== Group 1 ===
| Team | Pld | W | L | D | PF | PA | PD | Pts |
|---|---|---|---|---|---|---|---|---|
| Clann na nGael | 3 | 3 | 0 | 0 | 44 | 25 | +19 | 6 |
| Roscommon Gaels | 2 | 1 | 1 | 0 | 28 | 20 | +6 | 2 |
| St. Brigid's | 3 | 2 | 1 | 0 | 40 | 31 | +9 | 4 |
| Strokestown | 2 | 1 | 1 | 0 | 24 | 27 | -3 | 2 |
| Western Gaels | 2 | 1 | 1 | 0 | 29 | 36 | -7 | 2 |
| Boyle | 2 | 0 | 2 | 0 | 28 | 34 | -6 | 0 |

==== Round 1 ====
| 14 April 2018; 5:00 pm | Clann na nGael | 1-9 - 2-5 | St. Brigid's | Woodmount |

| 15 April 2018; 3:45 pm | Boyle | 1-10 - 2-9 | Strokestown | Strokestown |

| 15 April 2018; 4:30 pm | Roscommon Gaels | 4-9 - 0-10 | Western Gaels | Enfield |

==== Round 2 ====
| 20 April 2018; 8:00 pm | St. Brigid's | 1-11 - 1-6 | Strokestown | Kiltoom |

| 21 April 2018; 6:45 pm | Clann na nGael | 1-9 - 0-7 | Roscommon Gaels | Johnstown |

| 22 April 2018; 3:45 pm | Western Gaels | 2-13 - 1-12 | Boyle | Boyle |

==== Round 3 ====
| 2018 | Boyle | 1-04 - 1-17 | Clann na nGael | Ballyleague |

| 2018 | St. Brigid's | 1-12 - 0-10 | Roscommon Gaels | Lisnamult |

| 2018 | Strokestown | 0-10 - 0-07 | Western Gaels | O’Rourke Park |

==== Round 4 ====
| 2018 | St. Brigid's | -vs- | Boyle |

| 2018 | Clann na nGael | -vs- | Western Gaels |

| 2018 | Roscommon Gaels | -vs- | Strokestown |

==== Round 5 ====
| 2018 | Roscommon Gaels | -vs- | Boyle |

| 2018 | Clann na nGael | -vs- | Strokestown |

| 2018 | St. Brigid's | -vs- | Western Gaels |

=== Group 2 ===
| Team | Pld | W | L | D | PF | PA | PD | Pts |
|---|---|---|---|---|---|---|---|---|
| St. Faithleach's | 2 | 2 | 0 | 0 | 33 | 27 | +6 | 4 |
| Elphin | 2 | 2 | 0 | 0 | 34 | 29 | +5 | 4 |
| Pádraig Pearse's | 2 | 1 | 0 | 1 | 43 | 21 | +22 | 3 |
| St. Croan's | 2 | 0 | 1 | 1 | 29 | 32 | -3 | 1 |
| Michael Glavey's | 2 | 0 | 2 | 0 | 29 | 36 | -7 | 0 |
| Castlerea St. Kevin's | 2 | 0 | 2 | 0 | 19 | 42 | -23 | 0 |

==== Round 1 ====
| 14 April 2018; 6:45 pm | Pádraig Pearses | 3-19 - 0-6 | Castlerea St. Kevin's | Woodmount |

| 15 April 2018; 2:00 pm | St. Faithleach's | 3-10 - 1-11 | Michael Glavey's | Strokestown |

| 15 April 2018; 6:15 pm | Elphin | 2-11 - 1-11 | St. Croan's | Enfield |

==== Round 2 ====
| 21 April 2018; 5:00 pm | Pádraig Pearses | 1-12 - 1-12 | St. Croan's | Johnstown |

| 22 April 2018; 2:00 pm | Elphin | 3-8 - 1-12 | Michael Glavey's | Boyle |

| 22 April 2018; 3:45 pm | St. Faithleach's | 0-14 - 0-13 | St. Croan's | Strokestown |

==== Round 3 ====
| 2018 | St. Croan's | -vs- | Castlerea St. Kevin's |

| 2018 | Michael Glavey's | -vs- | Pádraig Pearses |

| 2018 | Elphin | -vs- | St. Faithleach's |

==== Round 4 ====
| 2018 | Elphin | -vs- | Castlerea St. Kevin's |

| 2018 | Pádraig Pearses | -vs- | St. Faithleach's |

| 2018 | St. Croan's | -vs- | Michael Glavey's |

==== Round 5 ====
| 2018 | Castlerea St. Kevin's | -vs- | Michael Glavey's |

| 2018 | St. Faithleach's | -vs- | St. Croan's |

| 2018 | Pádraig Pearses | -vs- | Elphin |

== Knock-Out Stages ==
=== Relegation Final ===
| 2018; Relegation Final | ??? | -vs- | ??? |

=== Finals ===
Quarter-Finals
???
???
???
???

Semi-Finals
???
???
???
???

Final
???
???

== Quarter-finals ==
| 2018; Quarter-Final | ??? | -vs- | ??? | ??? Referee: ??? |

| 2018; Quarter-Final | ??? | -vs- | ??? | ??? Referee: ??? |

== Semi-finals ==
| 2018; Semi-Final | ??? | -vs- | ??? | Dr. Hyde Park, Roscommon; Referee: ??? |

| 2018; Semi-Final | ??? | -vs- | ??? | Dr. Hyde Park; Referee: ??? |

== Final ==
| 2018; Final | ??? | -vs- | ??? | Dr. Hyde Park; Referee: ??? |
