= Martin Fallon =

Irish Gaelic footballer (1969–2025)

Personal information
- Native name: Máirtín Ó Fallúin (Irish)
- Nickname: Fozzy
- Born: 6 March 1969 Preston, Lancashire, England
- Died: 17 January 2025 (aged 55) Strokestown, County Roscommon, Ireland
- Occupation: Paramedic

Sport
- Sport: Gaelic football
- Position: Midfield
Club
- Years: Club
- Strokestown
Club titles
- Roscommon titles: 2
Inter-county
- Years: County
- 1988-1994: Roscommon
Inter-county titles
- Connacht titles: 1
- All-Irelands: 0
- NFL: 0
- All Stars: 0

Martin Fallon (March 1969 – 17 January 2025) was an Irish Gaelic footballer. At club level, he played with Strokestown and at inter-county level lined out at various levels with Roscommon.

== Career ==
Fallon first played Gaelic football at club level with Strokestown. After progressing to adult level, he was part of the Strokestown team that defeated Roscommon Gaels in a replay to win the Roscommon SFC title in 1992. Fallon added a Roscommon IFC title to his collection in 2000, after Strokestown reclaimed senior status. He ended his career by being part of the Strokestown team that won the Roscommon SFC title in 2002.

At inter-county level, Fallon first played for Roscommon at minor level before progressing to the under-21 team. He was just out of the minor grade when he made senior team debut in a challenge game in September 1988. Fallon was part of the Roscommon team that beat Mayo in a replay to win the Connacht SFC title in 1991.

== Personal life and death ==
Fallon was born in Lancashire in March 1969. He was two-years-old when the family moved to Tulsk, County Roscommon, before later settling in Strokestown. Fallon trained as an accountant before later becoming an emergency medical technician and, eventually, an advanced paramedic.

Fallon died on 17 January 2025, at the age of 55.

== Honours ==
Strokestown

- Roscommon Senior Football Championship: 1992, 2002
- Roscommon Intermediate Football Championship: 2000

Roscommon

- Connacht Senior Football Championship: 1991
