= Dromod =

Village in County Leitrim, Ireland

Dromod Dromad
- Village
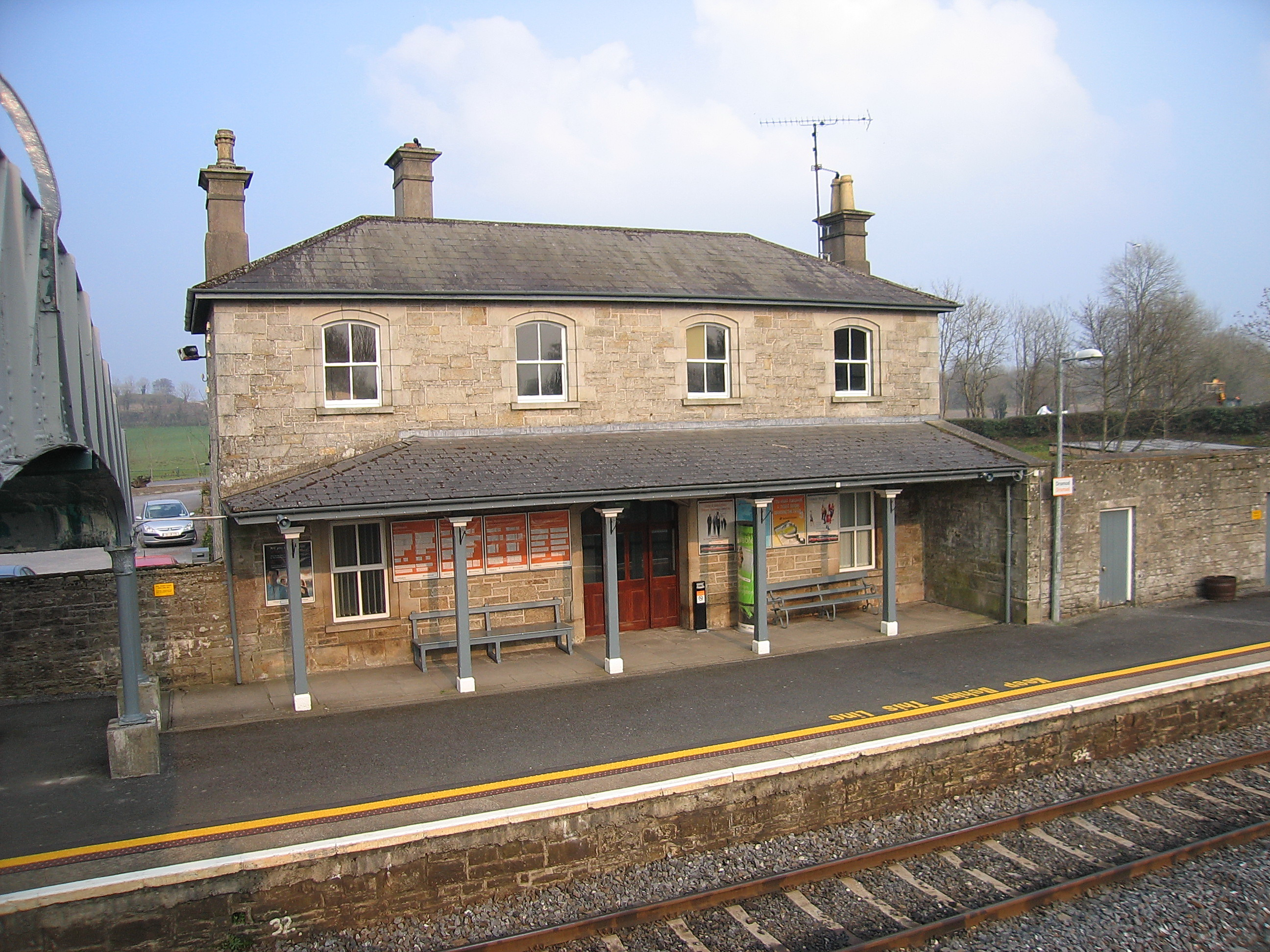
- Railway station

- Location in Ireland
- Coordinates: 53°51′27″N 7°55′12″W
- Country: Ireland
- Province: Connacht
- County: County Leitrim
- Elevation: 282 m (925 ft)

Population (2022)
  - Total: 753
- Time zone: UTC+0 (WET)
  - Summer (DST): UTC-1 (IST (WEST))
- Irish Grid Reference: N055907

Dromod or Drumod (Irish: Dromad, meaning 'long ridge, or back of the wood') is a village in County Leitrim, Ireland. Dromod is a fishing village beside Bofin and Boderg, which are threaded by the River Shannon. The village harbour is used by tourist vessels which cruise the Shannon. A water feature in the centre of the village, known as 'The Weeping Tree', was made by a local craftsman from a piece of bog oak which was found nearby.

== Demographics ==
Between 2006 and 2022, the population of Dromod increased from 210 to 753, an increase of 258.6%.

== Dromod railway station ==
The village has a station on the Dublin-Sligo railway line connecting Sligo and Dublin Connolly long the mainline. Dromod railway station opened on 3 December 1862 and remains in operation, despite closing for goods services on 3 November 1975. Dromod also had a railway station on the narrow gauge Cavan and Leitrim Railway. It opened on 24 October 1887 and finally closed on 1 April 1959. A short section of narrow gauge line has been reopened at the station as part of preservation efforts.

== History ==
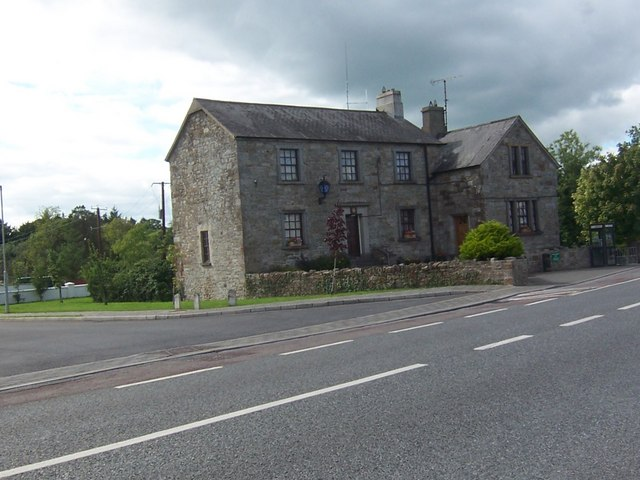
Dromod's former Garda station (closed in 2014)

In Gaelic Ireland the place was called "Dromode mac Shanley" in recognition of the dominant Mac Shanly sept of Muintir Eolais. The town is mentioned once in the Irish Annals- "1473: A great war broke out in Muintir-Eolais; and much was destroyed between them, both by burning and slaying. An attack was made by Mac Rannall on the town of Mac Shanly, and the town was burned, and Donough, the son of Donough Mac Shanly, and many others, were slain by him".

An Iron works was established at Dromod c. 1693 – c. 95. (Note: Iron works at Dromod and Ballinamore, on land confiscated from the Irish during the plantations of Ireland, had been established around 1695, by English adventurers named Capt. William Slacke, John Skerret, and Joseph Hall.) Pig iron brought to Dromod Finery forge was used to produce a malleable iron product, for transportation to Dublin and Limerick. The operation was closed down in the 1790s, due to an exhaustion of forests locally.

Through at least the 19th and 20th century, seven annual fairs were held at Dromod- 1 January, 28 March (or 29th), 15 May, 26 June (or 29th), 14 August, 10 October (or 11th), and 11 December.

Between 2000 and 2007, during the Celtic Tiger period, the village grew and several new housing estates and buildings were built in the area. Dromod was classified, by the Central Statistics Office, as a census town for the first time in the 2006 census. At that time it had a population of 210 people. By the 2022 census, the population had grown to 753 people.

The N4 national road, which previously ran through the village, was routed around Dromod and neighbouring Roosky with the opening of the N4 Dromod Roosky Bypass in December 2007.

== People ==
- John McDonald, a 19th-century poet, lived near Dromod

== See also ==
- List of towns and villages in Ireland

== Notes and references ==
=== Sources ===
- O'Donovan, John, ed. (1856). Annála Rioghachta Éireann. Annals of the Kingdom of Ireland by the Four Masters ... with a Translation and Copious Notes. 7 vols. Translated by O'Donovan (2nd ed.). Dublin: Royal Irish Academy. CELT editions. Full scans at Internet Archive: Vol. 1; Vol. 2; Vol. 3; Vol. 4; Vol. 5; Vol. 6; Indices.
- Downs Survey (1641). "Town of McShanley". Archived from the original on 25 January 2017.
- Joyce, P. W. (Patrick Weston) (1913). Irish names of places (PDF). Vol. v.3. Dublin : Phoenix.
- Longman (2011) [1819]. Traveller's New Guide Through Ireland, Containing a New and Accurate Description of the Roads (digitized from original in Lyon Public Library ed.). Longman. Archived from the original on 15 July 2020.
- Meehan, Joseph B. (1926). "Cavan and Leitrim Items in 18th Century Periodicals. I." (PDF). The Breiffne Antiquarian Society's Journal. Breiffne Antiquarian Society. Archived (PDF) from the original on 1 March 2017.
- Buchan, Patrick (1860). "On the Composition of the Iron Ores of the Connaught Coal-field". The Journal of the Royal Dublin Society. 2 (Original from the University of California; Digitized 20 October 2010 ed.): 1–27. Archived from the original on 28 February 2017.
- Watsons (1830). The Gentleman's and citizen's almanack ... for the year (PDF). Dublin, Printed for S. Watson [etc.]
- Murray, John (1866). Handbook for travellers in Ireland (2 ed.). John Murrary. p. 155.
- Kelly, Liam (1995). The face of Time. Lilliput Press.
