= Aidan Brady =

Aidan Brady may refer to:

- Aidan Brady (rugby union) (1939–2019), Irish rugby union international
- Aidan Brady (Gaelic footballer) (1930–1993), Irish Gaelic footballer for Roscommon
