= Roscommon Junior Football Championship =

- Irish: Craobh Sóisear Peile Ros Comáin
- Founded: 1927
- Trophy: Junior A Cup
- Title holders: St. Croans
- First winner: Elphin
- Most titles: Fuerty
- Sponsors: King and Moffatt

The Roscommon Junior Football Championship is an annual Gaelic Athletic Association competition between football clubs in County Roscommon. The winning club (or the best placed first-team) qualifies to represent its county in the Connacht Junior Club Football Championship.

== History ==
The JFC has been sponsored by the Roscommon People.

The JFC is broadcast live. It is known for providing "great excitement".

Quarter-final and semi-final draws take place.

== Qualification for subsequent competitions ==
The winning club goes up to the Roscommon Intermediate Football Championship for the following season.

=== Connacht Junior Club Football Championship ===
The Roscommon JFC winners qualify for the Connacht Junior Club Football Championship. It is the only team from County Roscommon to qualify for this competition. The Roscommon JFC winners enter the Connacht Junior Club Football Championship at the quarter-final stage. For example, 2013 winner Fuerty qualified for the Connacht final and won that game against a Galway club, from a traditionally larger county. That was the first time this competition's winner also won the Connacht final since Tulsk did so in 2004.

=== All-Ireland Junior Club Football Championship ===
The Roscommon JFC winners — by winning the Connacht Junior Club Football Championship — may qualify for the All-Ireland Junior Club Football Championship, at which they would enter at the semi-final stage, providing they haven't been drawn to face the British champions in the quarter-finals.

== Venue ==
The final is held at Dr Hyde Park.

If there is a replay it may be held at another venue such as Strokestown in 2022.

== Roll of honour ==
#	Club	Wins	Years won			
1	Fuerty	6	1928, 1942, 1950, 1991, 2006, 2013			
1	Clann na nGael	6	1940, 1954, 1984*, 1997*, 2011*, 2020*			
3	Creggs	5	1948, 1956, 1967, 1983, 2016			
3	St Brigid's	5	1952, 1990*, 2009*, 2017*, 2021*			
6	St Michael's	3	1953, 1970, 1993			
6	Shannon Gaels	3	1960, 1986, 2015			
6	Tarmon	3	1929, 1933, 1935			
6	Ballinameen	3	1995, 2010, 2019			
6	St Barry's	4	1996, 1998, 2007, 2024			
6	Castlerea	3	1957, 1989*, 2005*			
10	Elphin	2	1927, 1945			
10	Kilbride	2	1974, 1980			
10	Kilglass Gaels	2	2018, 2018			
10	Oran	2	1973, 2012			
10	Padraig Pearses	3	1994*, 2000*, 2022*			
10	Strokestown	2	1999*, 2001*			
10	Western Gaels	2	1977, 1990			
10	St Joseph's	2	1988, 2003			
10	St Croan's	3	1944, 1965, 2025			
19	Kilmore	1	1975			
19	Roscommon Gaels	1	1992*			
19	Tulsk	1	2004			
19	Kilmurray St Mary's	1	1959			
19	Mantua	1	1943			
19	St Faithleach's	1	1963			
19	Michael Glavey's	1	2014			
19	Éire Óg	1	1987			
19	Croghan	1	1939			
19	St Dominic's	1	2002			
19	Monastery, Farragher	1	1932	St. Michaels	1	2023

*Denotes wins by club's second-team

Records unavailable for 1929, 1934, 1936–38, 1941, 1946–47, 1949, 1951,1955, 1958, 1961–61, 1964, 1968–72, 1976, 1978–79, 1981

== List of recent finals ==
2021 St Brigid's B defeated Padraig Pearses B in the final, by 2-14 to 0-4.

2022 Padraig Pearses beat St Ronan's by 0-11 to 1-6 after a replay in Strokestown.

2023 St Michael's beat Clann na nGael by 2-17 to 0-9 at Dr Hyde Park.

2024 St Barry’s beat Clann na nGael by 0-17 to 0-12 after extra-time at Dr Hyde Park.

Year	Winner	Score	Runner-up	Score
2021	St Brigid's B	2-14	Padraig Pearses B	0-4
2022 (replay)	Padraig Pearses		St Ronan's	
2023	St Michael's	2-17	Clann na nGael	0-9
2024 (after extra time)	St Barry’s	0-17	Clann na nGael	0-12
2025				
