= Roosky =

Village in Leitrim and Roscommon, Ireland

Roosky Irish: Rúscaigh
- Village
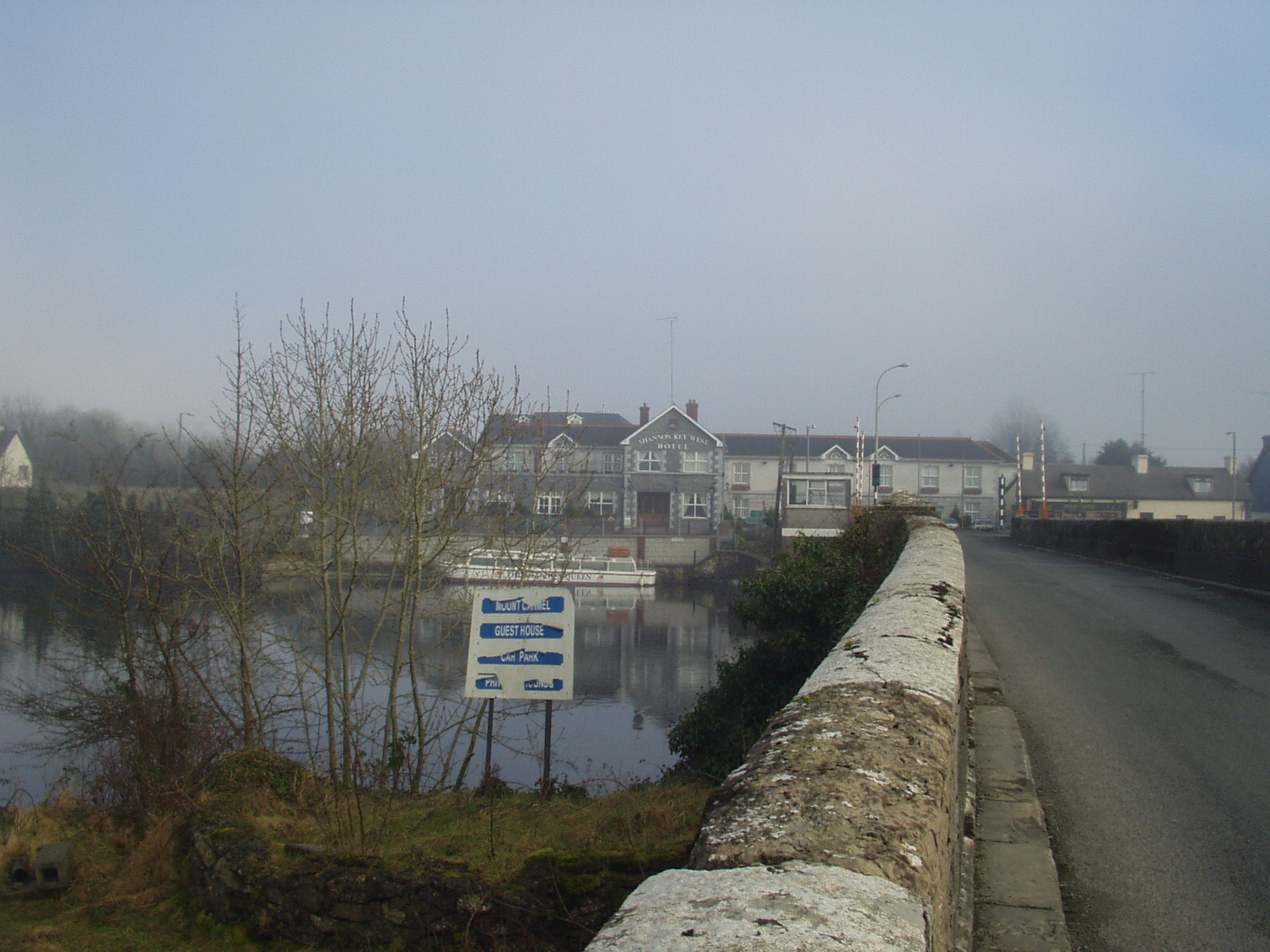
- Roosky, on the River Shannon

- Location in Ireland
- Coordinates: 53.8333°N 7.9167°W
- Country: Ireland
- Province: Connacht
- County: County Roscommon and County Leitrim
- Elevation: 75 m (246 ft)

Population (2022)
  - Total: 787
- Irish Grid Reference: N055870

Roosky, Ruskey, or Rooskey (Irish: Rúscaigh, meaning 'swamp' or 'bog') is a village on the River Shannon in the northern midlands of Ireland, near the point where counties Leitrim, Longford, and Roscommon meet. The N4 road from Dublin to Sligo passes by the Leitrim side of the village.

== History ==
In pre-Christian times, Roosky was a major gateway to Connacht. It's importance was considerable as it was where the three Kingdoms of Breifne, Mide and Connacht met.

Roosky owes its origins to St. Barry and his 6th-century monastic settlement once located 5km to the south of Roosky village. There were originally seven churches at Kilbarry but little remains now.

The original navigation through Roosky was through a lock on a canal to the west of the River Shannon, built in 1759. Alongside the canal was a corn mill, of which there is minimal trace of today.

The 1840s saw the Commissioners for the Improvement of the Navigation of the River Shannon reshape the village. The current masonry road bridge was finished in 1845. The nearby locks and lock keepers house was also built under the extensive civil engineering scheme.

Roosky was a lively market village in the mid-20th Century. The bridge was the scene of conflict during the Irish Civil War in 1922 and was also an important focal point for the National Farmers Association strike in 1967.

The portion of the village in County Leitrim was formerly known as Georgia or Gorteenoran (Irish: Goirtín Óráin) and constituted 5 houses and three licensed premises in 1925. This name is not in use today.

== Facilities ==
Our Lady of Mount Carmel, the Roman Catholic church holds regular masses. The village has a Post Office, a supermarket, a filling station, a Garda Station, a playground and a number of pubs. The community centre is located on the site of the old primary school.

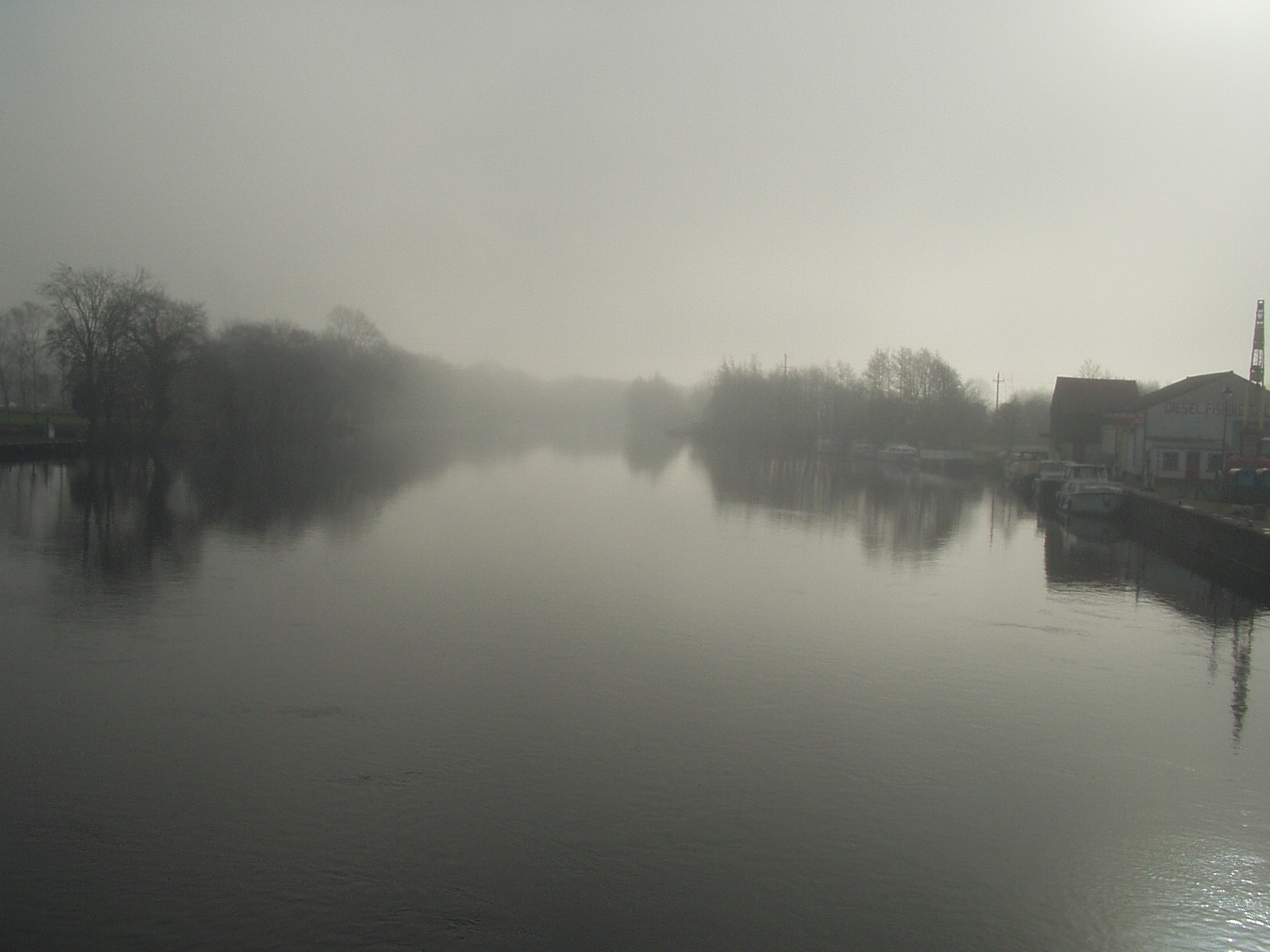
River Shannon at Roosky

== Tourism ==
Roosky is a destination for anglers, as the River Shannon and Lough Bofin are well stocked with coarse fish including roach, perch and bream. The marina is especially busy in the summer, with cruise vessels regularly stopping and a caravan park located at the harbour.

Outdoor activities that take place locally include watersports, horse riding, pony-trekking and walking routes along the River Shannon, canal and local bogs.

The Rooskey Heritage Festival is also held annually in the village. This community festival includes live music and heritage displays and promotes Rooskey village as a tourist destination. There are also art exhibitions, watersport displays and markets. Proceeds raised by the festival go towards the next year's festival and community projects which have included commissioning a wooden sculpture for the village, promoting the village's rich history by using plaques near points of interest and organising events all year celebrating heritage.

== Education ==
The village is served by the local primary school, Our Lady of Mount Carmel N.S., which was opened in 1997. An after-school was built on the school grounds in the late 2010s and early 2020s at the back of the school.

The Irish Education Inquiry 1824 recorded 127 students enrolled in three schools in Roosky. One school was exclusively Protestant and two were hedge schools for Catholic children.

== Culture ==
In 1957 the Cloudland Ballroom was opened by Albert Reynolds and his brother. The venue capacity was about 1,200. It closed in the 1980s.

The Shannon Key West Hotel was an entertainment venue in the village, until it went into liquidation, closing its doors on 18 October 2011. Every year, the village holds the 'Rooskey Heritage Festival,' usually in July.

== Industry ==
A pork processing plant, Hanley Meats, was established by the Hanley family in the 1930s. Later owned by Glanbia, it was the village's largest employer, at its peak employing over 600 people. On 8 May 2002, a fire destroyed much of the plant. Furthermore, the following year it was announced that the plant would not be rebuilt. The site remains derelict today.

Freudenberg Group operate a production plant dedicated to medical extrusion on the Leitrim side of the village, with the company's main factory in Carrick-on-Shannon.

Euro Accessories Ltd., a company supplying precast concrete products also have a factory and warehouse on the outskirts of the village.

== Rail Access ==
The nearest railway station is 3km away, at Dromod which is on the Dublin–Sligo railway line.

== Places of Interest ==
=== Roosky Bridge and Harbour ===
The bridge was designed by Thomas Rhodes and built in 1845 by the Commissioners for the Improvement of the Navigation of the River Shannon. The original swivel bridge was dismantled and replaced with an automatic lifting bridge in 1968. Alongside the bridge is a quay with mooring bollards. There is also a stone beacon (c.1880) with an orange domed cap, upstream to warn of shallow water along the west bank.

=== Roosky Lock ===
A flat 1.4 km walking trail leads to the lock and lock house (c.1840). The nearby waters, especially around Rabbit Island and Pigeon Island, are known for angling.

=== Our Lady of Mount Carmel Church ===
Our Lady of Mount Carmel R.C. Church dominates the western part of Roosky and its bell tower is a protected structure. Historically, the village was in the parish of Tarmonbarry until 1879. Up to the 1840s, no previous church had existed and Mass was celebrated in the parochial house, which was in the village. In 1844 a church was built under the tenure of Fr. James McNally, Parish Priest of Tarmonbarry and Roosky whose remains are interred inside the side aisle door on the north side of the church.

=== Canal ===
The canal was built in the 1760s to provide navigation through Roosky. There is a walking loop around the southern section of the canal.

=== Mount Carmel House ===
A riverside house built c.1820, it was home to the Maguire family, who were major landowners from Fermanagh.The building has a notable architectural feature of a chimney stack with seven diagonal chimneys with terracotta pots. The house was used as a guest house but is now vacant and has become derelict.

=== Pillbox ===
At the commencement of World War II, as part of the contingency plan, this receptacle was erected by the National Army. Its purpose was to house explosives, which, if necessary in an emergency situation, i.e. invasion or other incursions by hostile forces, could be used to blow up Roosky bridge. At the same time, a number of pairs of small chambers were drilled and made ready in the structure of the bridge itself, for the same purpose.

=== Church of Ireland Graveyard ===
An Anglican Church was built here in 1813 and served as a place of worship until it was demolished in the 1950s.

=== Water Tower ===
A freestanding octagonal-plan reinforced concrete water tower, built in the 1960s but currently out of commission, is an attractive landmark feature on the western approach to the village.

=== Pleasure House ===
A defensive fort called the 'Pleasure House' once stood on the shores of the Lough Bofin at Derryonogh. This included a man-made beach only accessible to people from the Anglo-Irish Protestant class. There is little evidence of the fortification today.

== Sport ==
=== GAA ===
Roosky is represented in GAA by Bornacoola (Leitrim) and Kilglass Gaels (Roscommon).

The village's original GAA Club was Roosky Pat Molloy's (1889-1950s). This Club then amalgamated with Slatta Parnellites, Tarmonbarry and Kilmore to form St. Barry's Ruskey-who won the Roscommon Junior Championship in 1969.

Kilglass Gaels GAA Club was founded in 1983 and has won Championships at every grade, including the Roscommon Intermediate Championship in 1999. In 2018, the Club claimed the Junior "A" Championship. History was made in 2009 when Kilglass Gaels won the Roscommon Senior Ladies Championship.

Bornacoola G.A.A. Club was founded in January 1889 by J.J. Kellegher N.T., at Johnstons Bridge. The team known as the Bornacoola Hugh O'Neill's played its first recorded match on 1 April 1889 against Roosky Pat Molloy's in Roosky.

Bornacoola have won the Leitrim Senior Football Championship on 5 occasions- 1904, 1938, 1943, 1953, 1957. In 2024, the Club claimed the Leitrim Junior Football Championship and currently play in the Intermediate grade.

Both Bornacoola and Kilglass Gaels are prominent forces in Scór, often competing against each other, and the two Clubs have claimed numerous All-Ireland Scór Titles.

=== Soccer ===
Roosky is home to Dynamo Rooskey F.C., founded in 1978 and who play their home games at Quinn's Field.

== Notable people ==
- John Bannon (1829–1913), Jesuit priest.
- Albert Reynolds (1932–2014), politician and 9th Taoiseach of Ireland, born in Roosky.

== See also ==
- List of towns and villages in Ireland
