= Tony McManus (Gaelic footballer) =

Roscommon Gaelic footballer

Personal information
- Born: 14 April 1957 (age 69) County Roscommon, Ireland
- Height: 5 ft 11 in (180 cm)

Sport
- Sport: Gaelic football
- Position: Forward
Club
- Years: Club
- 2000s: Clann na nGael
Club titles
- Roscommon titles: 12
- Connacht titles: 7
College
- Years: College
- UCD
College titles
- Sigerson titles: 3
Inter-county
Years	County	Apps (scores)
1977–1993	Roscommon	41 (16–75)
Inter-county titles
- Connacht titles: 6
- All-Irelands: 0
- NFL: 1
- All Stars: 1

Tony McManus (born 14 April 1957) is an Irish former Gaelic footballer. He played with the Roscommon county team from the 1970s until the 1990s. He won Connacht Senior Football Championship titles in 1977, 1978, 1979, 1980, 1990, 1991, a National League title in 1979, an All-Ireland Under-21 Football Championship title in 1978, he also played in the 1980 All-Ireland Senior Football Championship final when Roscommon lost to Kerry, and he won an All Star Award in 1989.

He played his club football for Clann na nGael. He won 12 Roscommon Senior Football Championship medals: in 1976–77, 1979, 1981–82 and 1984–91. He also won 7 Connacht Senior Club Football Championship medals: in 1982, 1984, 1985, 1986, 1987, 1988, 1989.

He also won three Sigerson Cup medals with UCD: in 1977, 1978 and 1979 as captain.

In May 2020, the Irish Independent named McManus as one of the "dozens of brilliant players" who narrowly missed selection for its "Top 20 footballers in Ireland over the past 50 years".
