= Aidan Brady (Gaelic footballer) =

Irish Gaelic footballer

Personal information
- Native name: Aodán Ó Brádaigh (Irish)
- Born: 1930 Elphin, County Roscommon, Ireland
- Died: 3 April 1993 (aged 62) Glasnevin, Dublin, Ireland
- Occupation: Director of the Botanic Gardens
- Height: 6 ft 1 in (185 cm)

Sport
- Sport: Gaelic football
- Position: Goalkeeper
Club
- Years: Club
- Elphin
Club titles
- Roscommon titles: 5
Inter-county
- Years: County
- 1951-1963: Roscommon
Inter-county titles
- Connacht titles: 4
- All-Irelands: 0
- NFL: 0

Aidan Brady (1930 – 3 April 1993) was an Irish Gaelic footballer who played for club side Elphin and at inter-county level with the Roscommon senior football team. He was named on the "Roscommon team of the millennium".

== Career ==
Born in Elphin, County Roscommon, Brady first came to Gaelic football prominence at Summerhill College in Sligo, where he was also selected for the Connacht colleges team. A minor with Roscommon in 1948 and a junior in 1951, he was reserve goalkeeper to Gerry Dolan for the 1951 Connacht Championship before taking over as first-choice 'keeper the following year. The following decade saw Brady win four Connacht Championship titles, while he also ended up on the losing side in the 1962 All-Ireland final. He lined out at full-back for the Elphin club, winning five County Championship titles, while his inclusion on the Connacht team saw him claim two Railway Cup medals. Brady was named on a special Football Team of the Century made up of players who never won an All-Ireland medal and was posthumously named on the Roscommon Football Team of the Millennium.

== Personal life and death ==
He is originally from Elphin, Co. Roscommon and is one of nine siblings. Brady spent over 25 years as Director of the National Botanic Gardens in Glasnevin. He died after a brief illness at the Bon Secours Hospital on 3 April 1993.

== Honours ==
Elphin

- Roscommon Senior Football Championship: 1950, 1951, 1955, 1956, 1957

Roscommon

- Connacht Senior Football Championship: 1952, 1953, 1961, 1962

Connacht

- Railway Cup:1957, 1958
