= Dromod railway station =

Station in County Leitrim, Ireland

Dromod Dromad
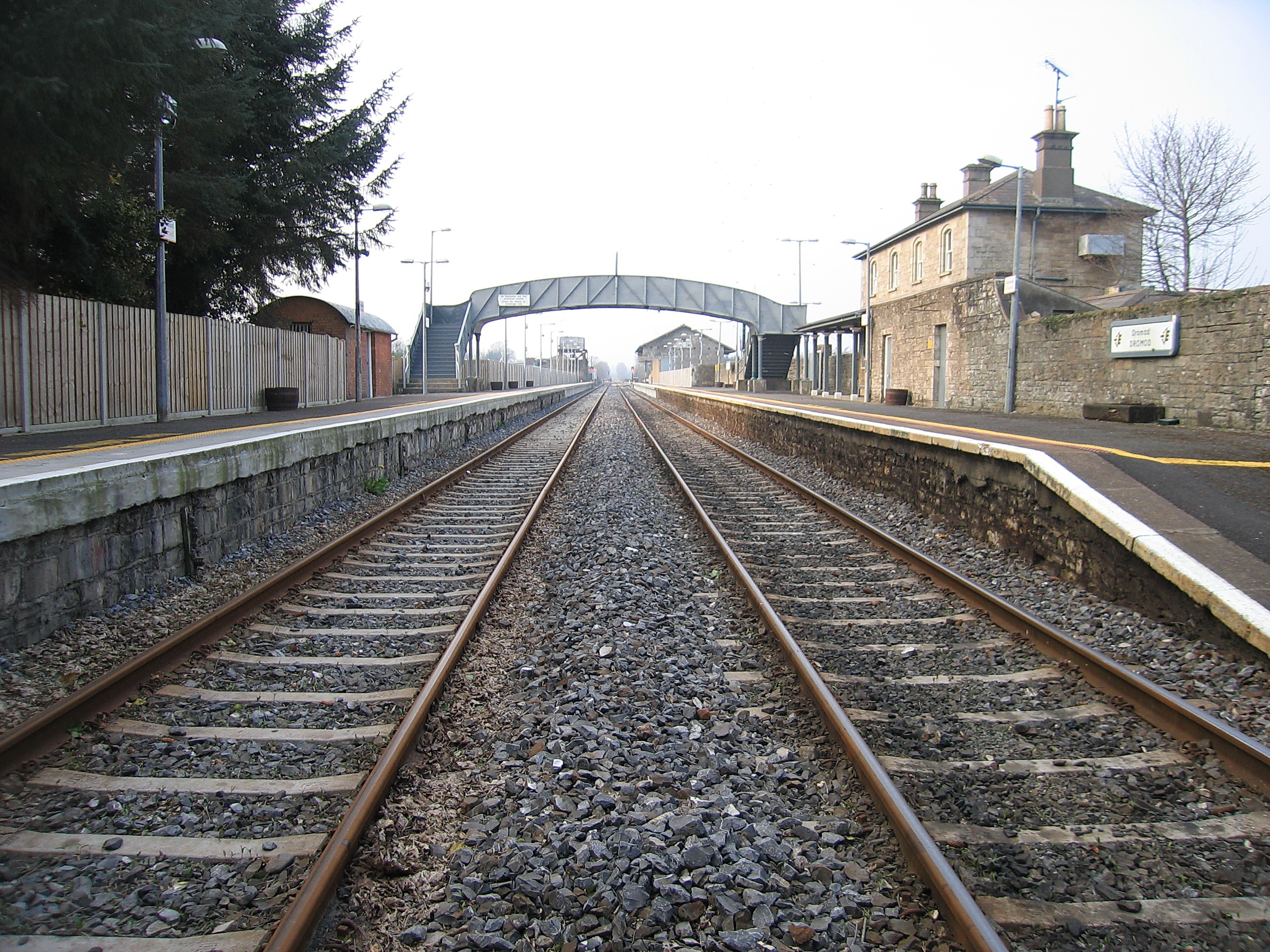

General information
- Location: Clooncolry, Dromod, County Leitrim, N41 KA40; Ireland
- Coordinates: 53.8590°N 7.9163°W
- Owner: Iarnród Éireann
- Operator: Iarnród Éireann
- Platforms: 2
- Bus operators: Bus Éireann; TFI Local Link
- Connections: 469; 564

Construction
- Structure type: At-grade

Other information
- Station code: DRMOD
- Fare zone: L
- Website: www.irishrail.ie/en-ie/station/dromod

Key dates
- 1862: Station opened
Location

Dromod railway station serves the village of Dromod in County Leitrim and nearby Roosky in County Roscommon. It is a station on the Dublin Connolly to Sligo InterCity service.

The station is shared with the short preserved section of the Cavan and Leitrim Railway.

== History ==
The station opened on 3 December 1862 and remains in operation, despite closing for goods services on 3 November 1975. Dromod was also a station on the narrow gauge Cavan and Leitrim Railway. It opened on 24 October 1887 and finally closed on 1 April 1959. A short section of narrow gauge line has been reopened at the station as part of preservation efforts.

== See also ==
- List of railway stations in Ireland

Preceding station	Iarnród Éireann	Following station
Longford	InterCity; Dublin-Sligo	Carrick-on-Shannon
