= John Joe Nerney =

Irish Gaelic footballer

John Joe Nerney (1 April 1922 – 24 June 2015) was an Irish Gaelic footballer who played as a left corner-forward with the Roscommon senior team.

Born in Croghan, County Roscommon, Nerney first played competitive football in his youth. He arrived on the inert-county scene at the age of seventeen when he first linked up with the Roscommon minor team. He subsequently joined the Roscommon senior team. Nerney was a regular on the starting fifteen for over a decade and won one All-Ireland medal and several Connacht medals. He was an All-Ireland runner-up on one occasion.

At club level Nerney played with Boyle.

In retirement from playing Nerney became involved in team management and coaching. He guided Eastern Harps in Sligo to a championship title in 1975.
