= Enda Smith =

Roscommon Gaelic footballer

Enda Gabriel Smith
Personal information
- Native name: Éanna Mac Gabhann (Irish)
- Born: 6 August 1994 (age 32) Boyle, Republic of Ireland
- Occupation: Gaelic footballer
- Height: 1.9 m (6 ft 3 in)

Sport
- Sport: Gaelic football
- Position: Left Half Forward
Club
- Years: Club
- 2011–: Boyle
College
- Years: College
- DCU
College titles
- Sigerson titles: 1
Inter-county*
Years	County	Apps (scores)
2013–	Roscommon	45 (12-52)
Inter-county titles
- Connacht titles: 2
- All Stars: 1
- *Inter County team apps and scores correct as of match played 29 June 2024.

Enda Smith (born 6 August 1994) is a Gaelic footballer who plays at senior level for the Roscommon county team and is from Boyle, County Roscommon in Ireland.

== Career ==
Smith plays his club football for the Boyle GAA club. While at university, he played for DCU where he won the Sigerson Cup in 2015 against UCC. During his university GAA matches, he formed a rivalry with UCC's Conor Cox who played county football for Kerry and later joined Smith at Roscommon. Smith made his senior inter-county debut for Roscommon in 2013. He was part of the Roscommon team that made it to the Super 8s stage of the All-Ireland Senior Football Championship after winning the 2017 Connacht Senior Football Championship but lost to Tyrone. Despite this, he was nominated for the GAA GPA All Stars Awards. By 2019, he had become the Roscommon county captain. Before the season started, he had fractured a bone in his hand but made a substitute appearance to score the winning point in the final of the 2019 Connacht Senior Football Championship against Mayo.

On 25 October 2017, Smith was named in the Ireland squad for the 2017 International Rules Series against Australia in November following Dublin GAA players declining to take part in the series due to club commitments and rest breaks.

== Personal life ==
Smith has three brothers, Cian and Donie, have played Gaelic football for Roscommon at differing levels. Until 2018, he studied at Dublin City University. Smith works as a teacher at St Declan’s College in Dublin, away from Gaelic football.

== Career statistics ==
As of match played 29 June 2024

Team	Year	National League			Connacht		All-Ireland		Total	
Team	Year	Division	Apps	Score	Apps	Score	Apps	Score	Apps	Score
Roscommon	2013	Division 3			1	0-02	1	0-00	2	0-02
Roscommon	2014	Division 3			2	0-00	2	0-05	4	0-05
Roscommon	2015	Division 2			2	0-06	2	2-01	4	2-07
Roscommon	2016	Division 1			3	2-03	1	1-01	4	3-04
Roscommon	2017	Division 1			2	0-03	2	0-02	4	0-05
Roscommon	2018	Division 2			2	0-02	4	3-02	6	3-04
Roscommon	2019	Division 1			1	0-01	3	1-02	4	1-03
Roscommon	2020	Division 2			1	0-00	-		1	0-00
Roscommon	2021	Division 1			1	0-03	-		1	0-03
Roscommon	2022	Division 2			2	0-05	1	0-00	3	0-05
Roscommon	2023	Division 1			2	1-01	4	1-11	6	2-12
Roscommon	2024	Division 1			1	0-00	5	1-02	6	1-02
Career total					20	3-26	25	9-26	45	12-52
