= St Faithleach's GAA =

Gaelic sports club in County Roscommon, Ireland

- CLG Naomh Faíthleach
- Founded: 1962
- County: Roscommon
- Colours: Red and White
- Grounds: Ballyclare
- Coordinates: 53°40′34.1″N 8°00′34.1″W

Playing kits
Standard colours

Senior Club Championships
	All Ireland	Connacht champions	Roscommon champions
Football:	-	0	1

St Faithleach's GAA (/ˈfɑːl.jəz/ FAWL-yaz;) is a Gaelic Athletic Association club based in Ballyleague, County Roscommon. The club plays in white and red and draws its membership from the parishes of Kilgefin and Cloontuskert.

== History ==
The club, which was formed in 1962, serves the areas of Curraghroe, Ballyleague, Cloontuskert, and Kilrooskey. The club is named after Faithleach of Clontuskert [fˠalʲax], who founded an abbey at Cloontuskert near Lanesborough in AD 520. Saint Faithleachs was a son of Fionnlugh Mac Olchú, and a brother of Brendan the Navigator also known as ‘The Voyager’.

The club won a Junior title in their first year, 1963, and reached a Roscommon Senior Football Championship final in 1965. They faced reigning county champions Shannon Gaels and won by one point, 0-10 to 1-06. This is the clubs first and only to date senior county title.

Since 1965, St Faithleach's have made it to the county final four times, being beaten by Clann na nGael in 1981 and St Brigid's three times, in 2006, 2007 and 2014.

Despite winning the O'Rourke Cup (Division One League) in 2019, the club was relegated to the Roscommon Intermediate Football Championship in the same year, after losing a relegation final against St Croan's GAA. This ended a 17 year stint in Roscommon's top competition.

However, in 2021, the club captured their third Intermediate county title and promoted back to the senior championship. The team went on to win their first Connacht Intermediate Club Football Championship defeating Naomh Anna of Galway by 2-14 to 2-12 in extra time, thanks to a last chance goal by Mikey Cox.

== Notable players ==
- Pat Lindsay - captained Roscommon to a National League title in 1979, five time Connacht champion and 1977 All-Star.
- Ciarán Murtagh - captained Roscommon to the 2017 Connacht Senior Football Championship.

== Honours ==
- Roscommon Senior Football Championship (1): 1965
- Roscommon Intermediate Football Championship (3): 1992, 2002, 2021
- Roscommon Junior A Football Championship (1): 1963
- O’Rourke Cup / Division One League (4): 1971, 1976, 2004, 2019
- Connacht Intermediate Football Championship (1): 2021
