= Ciarán Murtagh =

Irish Gaelic footballer

Personal information
- Born: 1992 or 1993 (age 33–34)

Sport
- Sport: Gaelic football
Clubs
- Years: Club
- ? c. 2019: St Faithleachs; Donegal Boston
College
- Years: College
- c. 2013: NUI Galway
Inter-county
Years	County	Apps (scores)
2014 - Present	Roscommon	34 (9-89)
Inter-county titles
- Connacht titles: 1 (2017)

Ciarán Murtagh (born 1992) is a Gaelic footballer who plays for St Faithleach's and the Roscommon county team.

A son of Andy and Breda Murtagh, he completed a degree in corporate law at NUI Galway before returning to his studies at Marino Institute of Education to become a teacher. While at Galway he played in the university's Sigerson Cup team.

He made his senior championship debut against Leitrim in the 2014 Connacht Senior Football Championship quarter-final. He scored a late goal against Down in the 2014 All-Ireland Senior Football Championship.

He has captained Roscommon.

Murtagh has also played for Donegal Boston.

== Career statistics ==
As of match played 24 June 2023

Team	Year	National League			Connacht		All-Ireland		Total	
Team	Year	Division	Apps	Score	Apps	Score	Apps	Score	Apps	Score
Roscommon	2014	Division 3			2	0-02	2	1-00	4	1-02
Roscommon	2015	Division 2			2	1-04	2	0-06	4	1-10
Roscommon	2016	Division 1			5	3-14	1	0-03	6	3-17
Roscommon	2017	Division 1			2	0-07	2	1-02	4	1-09
Roscommon	2018	Division 2			2	1-03	4	1-15	6	2-18
Roscommon	2019	Division 1			DNP Championship Matches					
Roscommon	2020	Division 2			DNP Championship Matches					
Roscommon	2021	Division 1			1	0-01	-		1	0-01
Roscommon	2022	Division 2			2	0-05	1	0-05	3	0-10
Roscommon	2023	Division 1			2	1-06	4	0-16	6	1-22
Career total					18	6-42	16	3-47	34	9-89
