= John B. Bannon =

Irish priest

The Reverend John B. Bannon
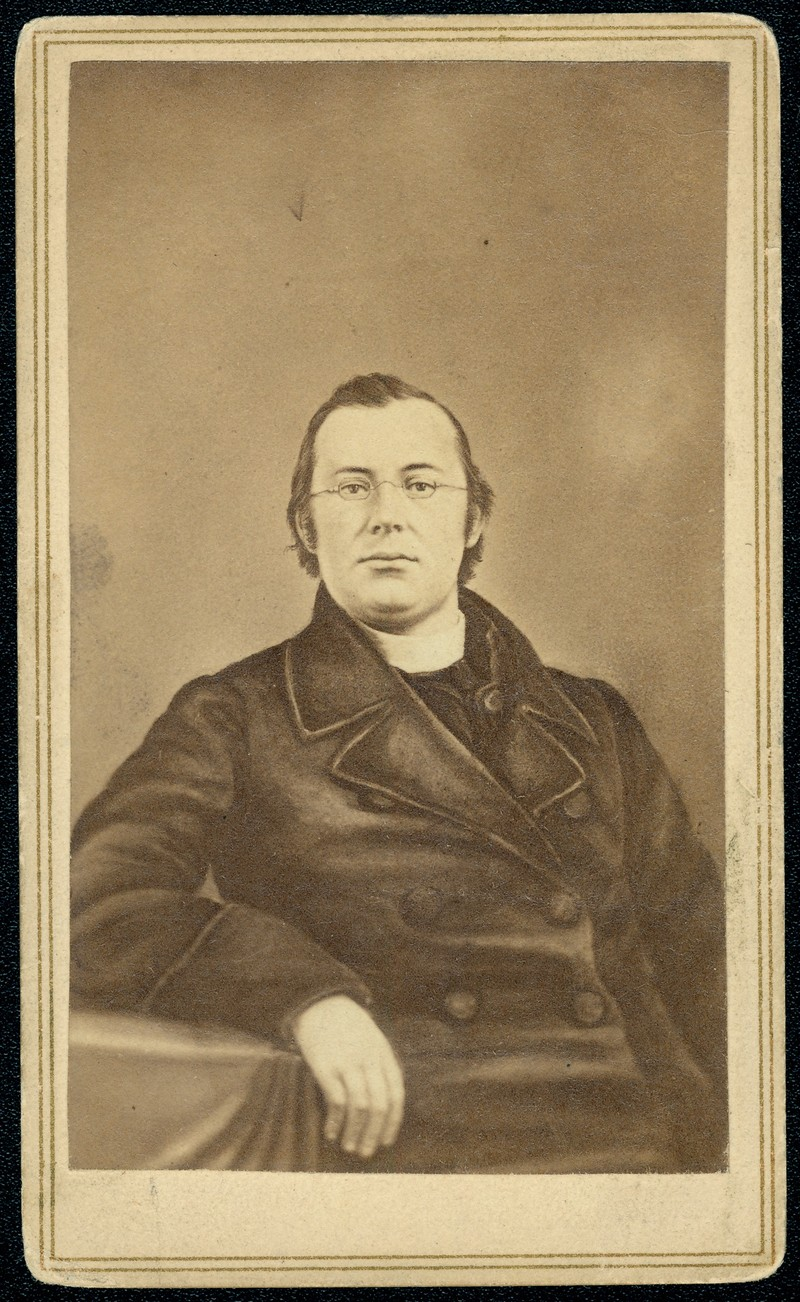
- Portrait of Father John B. Bannon

Orders
- Ordination: 16 June 1853 by Paul Cullen

Personal details
- Born: 29 December 1829 Roosky, County Roscommon, Ireland
- Died: 14 July 1913 (aged 83) Dublin, Ireland
- Buried: Glasnevin Cemetery
- Denomination: Catholic Church

John B. Bannon (1829–1913), was an Irish Catholic priest who served as a Confederate chaplain and diplomatic agent in Europe during the American Civil War. Though forgotten in later times, it has been said that "No religious figure of the South contributed more to the cause of Confederate independence than Bannon." He was called the "Fighting Chaplain", "the most notable chaplain in the Civil War", and "the Catholic priest who always went into battle."

== Early life ==
Bannon was born on 29 December 1829 at Rooskey, County Roscommon, and was raised there. His father was James Bannon, a Dublin grain dealer, and his mother Fanny Bannon (née O'Farrell), a daughter of Michael O'Farrell from Lansbrough, County Longford, who owned extensive properties there and in neighboring Roscommon. In 1846 he began studying for the priesthood at St Patrick's College, Maynooth, and completed a theology course between 1850 and 1853. He was ordained on 16 June 1853 by Archbishop Paul Cullen of the Archdiocese of Dublin. He soon applied to move to St. Louis, the only Catholic archdiocese in the United States's Midwest, which had a rapidly growing population of Irish and German immigrants.

On 5 September 1858 Bannon was appointed secretary of the Second Provincial Council of St. Louis by archbishop Peter Richard Kenrick. He joined the St. Louis Catholic Literary Institute at St. Louis University and became the chaplain of a militia company, the Washington Blues, and unofficial chaplain of the Emmet and Montgomery Guards, Irish brigades of the Missouri Volunteer Militia. In November, Kenrick appointed Bannon pastor of St. John's parish and commissioned him to build a church, which became St. John the Apostle and Evangelist.

== American Civil War ==
=== Camp Jackson affair and Mississippi campaign ===
At the beginning of the war, Bannon's militia was detained by captain Nathaniel Lyon's federal troops at the Camp Jackson affair. Most of Lyon's soldiers were "Forty-eighters" from Germany. As the militia was led away, St. Louis citizens gathered around and one shot a Polish officer. The other soldiers fired back and killed 28 civilians. People involved in the militia would later comment that most had no intention of going south, and would have joined the Union Army if it had not been for Camp Jackson. After being paroled, Bannon joined former governor Sterling Price's pro-Southern forces and became chaplain of the First Missouri Confederate Brigade.

At the Battle of Pea Ridge in Arkansas, Bannon ministered at the front lines and joined an artillery crew after some cannoneers were killed. He was then transferred to Mississippi, where he served at the battles of Iuka, First Corinth, Grand Gulf, Port Gibson, Champion Hill, and Vicksburg. At Corinth and Vicksburg, Bannon tended to the wounded with the New Orleans Sisters of Charity. According to Bannon, many expressly sought their hospital, and over 80% of the Protestants that they treated converted to Catholicism. Bannon was captured on July 1863 when Vicksburg surrendered.

=== Confederate agent in Ireland ===
Released on a prisoner exchange, Bannon went to Mobile, Alabama and then to Richmond, Virginia where he preached at St. Peter's Cathedral. There he came to the attention of Confederate secretary of the navy Stephen Mallory, the only Catholic in Jefferson Davis's cabinet, and Davis invited Bannon to meet him in the White House of the Confederacy.

On 1 September, Davis enlisted Bannon to join Captain James L. Capston in Ireland, where they would rally the locals against volunteering for the Union Army. Secretary of state Judah P. Benjamin instructed Bannon to highlight the slaughter of Thomas Francis Meagher's Irish Brigade at the Battle of Fredericksburg, the fact that Irishmen in the Union Army would be fighting other Irishmen in the Confederate Army, the ill-treatment of foreigners and anti-Catholicism of the Know-Nothings in the North before the war, and the desecration of Catholic places of worship in the Confederacy by Union troops from New England. Bannon would keep the purpose of his mission secret, but not use disguises, false identities, or break British law, and would be paid $1,212.50 in gold for his salary and travel expenses.

Bannon boarded the blockade runner Robert E. Lee at Wilmington, North Carolina and sailed for Bermuda. During the trip he talked to a sailor, John B. Tabb, who would convert to Catholicism and become a priest after the war. There he sailed to Halifax, Nova Scotia and then to London. He arrived in October and met the chief Confederate agent in Britain, Henry Hotze, before finally settling in Dublin.

Although Union recruiters in Ireland sometimes used fraudulent recruiting practices like getting men drunk or luring them to America with promises of false jobs in railroad construction, Bannon reported that most emigrants were voluntary and motivated by crop failures in 1861 and 1862. The British government tried to thwart enlistment, but 15,000 - 18,000 Irish still left every month. Nevertheless, he started his mission by giving American news to newspapers and writing a letter to The Nation under the name Sacerdos ("Priest" in Latin) in which he explained the South's justification for secession. He was helped by the archbishop of Tuam John MacHale, who denounced emigration, and John Martin, a leader of the Young Ireland rebellion that had become critical of Meagher. Bannon then printed anti-enlistment circulars and posters to be distributed in the ports of Cork and Galway, reproducing a letter from John Mitchel where he lamented the deaths of his two sons while fighting for the Confederacy.

In January 1864, Bannon mailed 12,000 copies of another poster, two for each parish priest in Ireland, in which he reproduced correspondence between pope Pius IX, Davis, and the archbishop of New York, John Hughes, where the pope begged Hughes to use every effort in bringing about a peaceful resolution to the war. Bannon requested the posters to be placed in public places where parishioners would see them and be discouraged from emigration until the war was over.

The circulars of "Sacerdos" reached England, where The Times commented positively on their reasoning on 8 March 1864. The same month, Bannon did a lecture tour of Ireland, affirming that the North was controlled by capitalists, anti-Catholic and anti-immigrant, and the South was friendlier to these collectives, with French heritage in Louisiana, Spanish in Florida, and Irish in Maryland and Kentucky, as well as political stances closer to the leaders of the American Revolution than the North. He only mentioned African Americans and slavery once: to claim that Catholic military leaders in the Union were tokens intended to lure Irish immigrants to fight for the Union, but that in reality Catholics were treated worse in the North than slaves were treated in the South. In Cork, he met the archbishop of Charleston, Patrick Neeson Lynch, who had been sent in a diplomatic mission to Paris and Rome. In early spring, Bannon supplied the Southern Independence Association in England with American and Irish newspapers to support their position.

=== Mission to England, France, and Rome ===
Before traveling to Ireland, Bannon suggested Davis to pursue recognition from the pope as a way to recover the moral high ground after the North's passing of the Emancipation Proclamation. It was hoped that papal recognition would persuade a minor Catholic nation to follow, and that this would cascade into recognition by France and then Britain, which had repeatedly refused to recognize the Confederate States of America. The first emissary to meet the pope was Ambrose Dudley Mann in 1863, who had been appointed Confederate commissioner to Belgium two years earlier.

In 1864, Bannon followed archbishop Lynch to London, where they met cardinal Nicholas Wiseman, several members of parliament, and Confederate agents. They continued to Paris, meeting the nuncio cardinal Flavio Chigi, foreign minister Édouard Drouyn de Lhuys, emperor Napoleon III, Confederate agents, French bishops and clergy. According to Lynch, the emperor "enquired about the demeanor of the negroes", to which the slave-owner Lynch replied that they "had never been more quiet and submissive; that the tumult of war seemed to have oppressed them with awe". The emperor then "said he hoped there would be soon some decisive battle so that England and France might at once recognize the South."

In Italy, Bannon saved the life of a female tourist who had latched to their retinue, by pulling her from her horse before the animal fell off a cliff. They arrived in Rome on 26 June and met the papal secretary of state, cardinal Giacomo Antonelli, who was noncommittal. On 4 July, they were received by Pius IX, not as diplomatic envoys but as members of the clergy. The pope said that it was "clear" that North and South were "two nations", but also that he would not speak in support of slavery if he was called to mediate in the war. He thought the Union's single act of emancipation was too drastic, but recommended the South to improve the conditions of slaves and work towards gradual emancipation. There was no diplomatic recognition of the Confederacy.

While in Rome, Bannon asked to join the Jesuit Order.

== Post-war ==
On 26 December 1864 Bannon returned to Ireland and on 9 January 1865 he became a Jesuit novitiate in Milltown Park. He never returned to St. Louis. Between 1866 and 1867 he studied theology at Louvain University in Belgium, where he was visited by the bishop of Richmond, John McGill, and informed that the extinct Confederate Congress had voted Bannon a $3,000 bonus for his success in stopping federal recruiting in Ireland.

Bannon wrote an account of his army experience for Notice and Letters, a Jesuit publication in Britain, where he contrasted it with experiences of chaplains in the Crimean War.

Bannon missionized through Ireland and the Isle of Man before pronouncing final vows for the Jesuit order in 1876. He died on 14 July 1913 in Upper Gardiner Street, and was buried in the Jesuit plot at Glasnevin Cemetery, Dublin.

== See also ==
- Diplomacy of the American Civil War
