= Boyle GAA =

- CLG Mainistir na Búille
- Founded: 1889
- County: Roscommon
- Colours: Maroon and White
- Grounds: Abbey Park
- Coordinates: 53°58′29.1″N 8°17′50.1″W

Playing kits
Standard colours

Senior Club Championships
	All Ireland	Connacht champions	Roscommon champions
Football:	-	0	2
Hurling:	-	0	1

Boyle GAA (Irish: CLG Mainistir na Búille) is a Gaelic Athletic Association club based in Boyle, County Roscommon. The club was founded in 1889 and plays in maroon and white.

== History ==
In 1889, Roscommon's first county convention took place in Boyle, where its county board was first founded. Five Boyle clubs were represented at the convention, Knockarush, Lowparks, Owen Roes, Tawnytaskin and Democrats. In 1890 the Boyle 'Young Irelanders' won the clubs first Senior championship. In 1927 Boyle, represented by 18th Infantry Battalion based in the town, won a county double, with victories in the Roscommon Senior Football Championship and Roscommon Senior Hurling Championship.

For the rest of the century, Boyle competed at Junior and Intermediate grades, with victories in the Roscommon Intermediate Football Championship in 1983, 1994 and 2005 being followed by demotion from the senior championship. Since the clubs victory in the 2013 intermediate championship, Boyle has seen success at the senior level.

In 2022, Boyle competed in its first Roscommon Senior Football Championship final in 95 years. The club faced Strokestown GAA and were defeated by 1 point, 0–11 to 0–10, in injury time. Boyle would reach a second senior final in a row in 2023, facing St Brigid's. The club lost again by one point, 0–12 to 0–11.

Eamonn O'Hara was managing the club in July 2025, when he was ratified as joint manager of the Sligo senior footballers with Dessie Sloyan.

== Notable players ==
- Enda Smith - captained Roscommon to the 2019 Connacht Senior Football Championship.
- John Joe Nerney

== Honours ==
- Roscommon Senior Football Championship (2): 1890, 1927
- Roscommon Intermediate Football Championship (4): 1983, 1994, 2005, 2013
- O’Rourke Cup / Division One League (1): 2022
- Roscommon Senior Hurling Championship (1): 1927
