= Lough Bofin (River Shannon) =

Lake on the River Shannon, Ireland

- Loch Bó Finne (Irish)
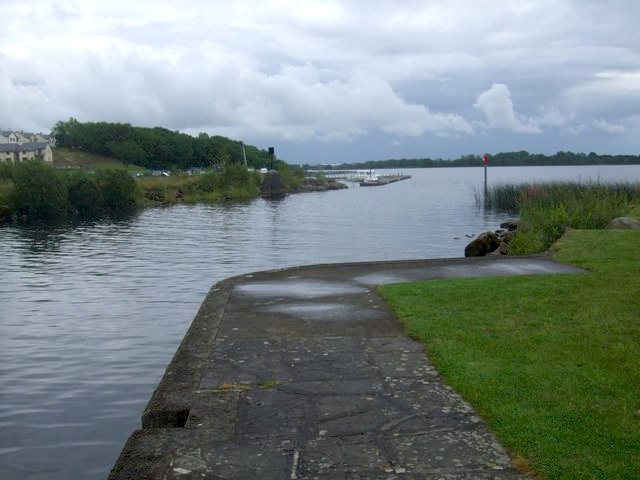
- Harbour in Dromod, opening onto Lough Bofin

- Location within Ireland
- Location: Ireland
- Coordinates: 53.848566°N 7.941400°W
- Primary inflows: Lough Boderg (River Shannon), Lough Scannal, Feorish River
- Primary outflows: River Shannon
- Basin countries: Ireland
- Surface area: 2.6 km^{2} (1.0 sq mi)
- Surface elevation: 42 m (138 ft)
- Islands: Pigeon Island, Inchmurrin (Rabbit Island), Sallow Island, Otter Island
- Settlements: Roosky, Dromod

Lough Bofin (Irish: Loch Bó Finne) is a lake on the River Shannon on the County Roscommon–County Leitrim border in Ireland.

== History and legend ==
The lake's name is Irish for "Lake of the white cow." Lough Bofin is separated from Lough Boderg ("Lake of the red cow") by the Derrycarne Narrows.

== Recreation ==
Lough Bofin is a noted fishery for bream, rudd, roach, northern pike, eel and perch.

== See also ==
- List of loughs in Ireland
