= Roscommon Intermediate Football Championship =

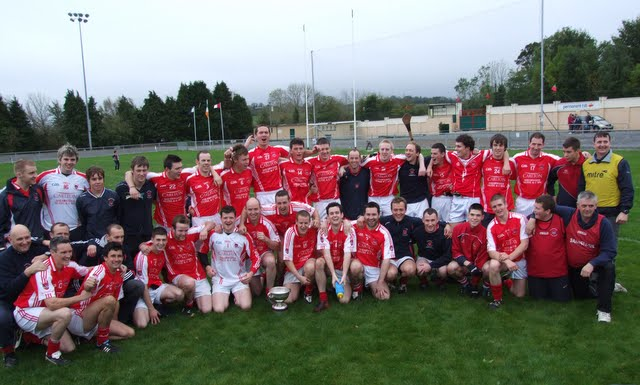
- 2011 Championship Winners
- Irish: Craobh Idirmhéanach Peile Ros Comáin
- Founded: 1970
- Trophy: Jimmy Murray Cup
- Title holders: Éire Óg
- First winner: Michael Glaveys
- Most titles: Michael Glaveys
- Sponsors: McNulty’s Furniture Roscommon.

The Roscommon Intermediate Football Championship is an annual Gaelic Athletic Association competition between mid-tier football clubs in County Roscommon. The winning club qualifies to represent its county in the Connacht Intermediate Club Football Championship, and, in turn, goes on to the All-Ireland Intermediate Club Football Championship.

The 2026 championship was won by Éire Óg, who defeated Tulsk by a scoreline of 2–7 to 0–12.

== Qualification for subsequent competitions ==
=== Connacht Intermediate Club Football Championship ===
The Roscommon IFC winners qualify for the Connacht Intermediate Club Football Championship. It is the only team from County Roscommon to qualify for this competition. The Roscommon IFC winners enter the Connacht Intermediate Club Football Championship at the quarter-final stage. For example, 2021 winner St. Faithleach's qualified for the Connacht final, and won the game with a last-minute goal. 2017 winner Michael Glavey's also won the Connacht final, as did 2014 winner St Croan's. That was the first time that this competition's winner also won the Connacht final since Western Gaels did so in 2004.

=== All-Ireland Intermediate Club Football Championship ===
The Roscommon IFC winners — by winning the Connacht Intermediate Club Football Championship — may qualify for the All-Ireland Intermediate Club Football Championship, at which they would enter at the semi-final stage, providing they haven't been drawn to face the British champions in the quarter-finals.

=== Roscommon Senior Football Championship ===
The winning club gains promotion to the Senior Championship.

== Venue ==
The final is traditionally held at Dr Hyde Park.

== Roll of honour ==
#	Club	Wins	Years won
1	Michael Glaveys	5	1970, 1972, 1985, 2015, 2017
1	St Dominic's	5	1973, 1982, 1995, 2007, 2022
3	St Croan's	4	1978, 1989, 2009, 2014
3	Boyle	4	1983, 1994, 2005, 2013
3	St Aidan's	4	1975, 1990, 2001, 2012
3	Oran	4	1974, 1980, 1997, 2020
3	Strokestown	4	1977, 2000, 2010, 2025
8	St Faithleach's	3	1992, 2002, 2021
8	Tulsk	3	1976, 1984, 2019
8	Kilmore	3	1981, 2006, 2016
8	Elphin	3	1979, 2003, 2024
12	Western Gaels	2	1998, 2004
12	St Ronan's	2	1986, 1996
12	Kilbride	2	1988, 2008
12	Castlerea St Kevin's	2	1987, 2023
12	Eire Óg	2	1993, 2026
17	Fuerty	1	2018
17	St Michael's	1	1971
17	Kilglass Gaels	1	1999
17	Padraig Pearses	1	2011
17	Shannon Gaels	1	1991

== List of finals ==
Year	Winner	Score	Runner-up	Score
2026	Éire Óg	2-7	Tulsk	0-12
2025	Strokestown	2-13	Éire Óg	0-15
2024	Elphin	2-09	Strokestown	0-07
2023	Castlerea St Kevin's	1-13	Éire Óg	0-15
2022	St Dominic’s	2-08	Éire Óg	2-06
2021	St Faithleach's	1-08	St Dominic's	0-07 AET
2020	Oran	2-16	St Dominic's	2-09 AET
2019	Tulsk	2-10; 0-14	Oran	2-10, 0-14
2018	Fuerty	1-13; 2-10	Oran	2-10; 1-06
2017	Michael Glaveys	0-12	Fuerty	0-10
2016	Kilmore	1-05; 2-16	Oran	0-08; 1-11
2015	Michael Glaveys	3-08	Fuerty	1-13
2014	St Croan's	2-14	Tulsk	0-7
2013	Boyle	2-12	Tulsk	2-09
2012	St Aidan's	2-12	St Michael's	2-05
2011	Pádraig Pearse's	2-10	St Dominic's	1-07
2010	Strokestown	0-10	St Brigid's B	0-08
2009	St Croan's	1-09	St Dominic's	0-09
