= Lough Boderg =

Lake on the River Shannon, Ireland

- Loch Bó Dearg (Irish)
- Location within Ireland
- Location: Ireland
- Coordinates: 53.871264°N 7.978204°W
- Primary inflows: River Shannon
- Primary outflows: River Shannon
- Basin countries: Ireland
- Surface area: 5.1 km^{2} (2.0 sq mi)
- Surface elevation: 36 m (118 ft)
- Islands: Inishmoylin, Dockery's Island, Coarse Island, Illanamoe

Lough Boderg (Irish: Loch Bó Dearg) is a lake on the River Shannon in County Roscommon and County Leitrim, Ireland.

== Description ==
Logh Boderg is a large lough with a surface area of about 1,200 hectares (3,000 acres) which is on the River Shannon, between Kilmore, County Roscommon and Annaduff in County Leitrim. The woodland of Derrycarne which were part of the lands owned by the Nesbitt family in the early 1800s sit on the shores of the Lough, the paths there give access to the lough's shoreline.

== History and legend ==
The lake's name is Irish for "Lake of the red cow." Lough Boderg is separated from Lough Bofin ("Lake of the white cow") by the Derrycarne Narrows. There is a legend on how the loughs got their names, the story goes that a mermaid was found in the water of one of the loughs and taken to a nearby farmhouse. The people in the farmhouse were kind to her and to pay them back for their kindness the mermaid began to tell fortunes. The mermaid predicted that if the people put her back in the water, in the eve of May day, which was soon, that they would be generously repaid one year later. The people did as she said, placed her back in the water and said goodbye. A year to the day, they returned to the place where they had put the mermaid back in the water and were astonished to see two cows coming out of the water, a red one and a white one.

Túathal Techtmar used Lough Boderg as one of the traditional boundaries of the ancient Kingdom of Meath: "From Loch-Bo-Deirg to Birra [Birr], From Sena [Shannon] eastward to the sea."

== Recreation ==
Lough Boderg is a noted fishery for bream, rudd, roach, northern pike, eel and perch.

The North Shannon Motor Yacht Club is based on Lough Boderg.

== See also ==
- List of loughs in Ireland
