= Elphin GAA =

Elphin
- Ail Finn
- Founded: 1888
- County: Roscommon
- Colours: Orange and black
- Grounds: Orchard Park
- Coordinates: 53°50′53″N 8°11′32″W

Playing kits
Standard colours

Senior Club Championships
	All Ireland	Connacht champions	Roscommon champions
Football:	0	0	15
Hurling:	0	0	1

Elphin GAA is a Gaelic Athletic Association club in Elphin, County Roscommon, Ireland. The club is primarily concerned with the game of Gaelic football.

== History ==
Located in the village of Elphin, County Roscommon, Elphin GAA Club was founded in April 1888 and was originally named William O'Briens in honour of nationalist politician William O'Brien. Success was immediate with the new club becoming the inaugural winners of the Roscommon SFC title in 1889. Elphin also become the first club to win five successive SFC titles (1901–1905) and held that record for over 80 years.

Elphin went into a period of decline following these successes, however, Elphin won a Roscommon SHC title in 1925. The club had sporadic periods of success at various times over the course of the following few decades, with the club winning their 15th and final SFC title in 1957. In spite of this, Elphin win titles in the intermediate grade, culminating with a Connacht Club IFC title in 2003. The club claimed a third Roscommon IFC title and secured senior status once again in 2024.

== Crest ==
The club crest displays several local symbols:

- A rock next to a spring of water (referring to the town's etymology, ail finn, "rock of the bright [water].")
- A bishop's mitre, symbolising the position of Bishop of Elphin, which dates back to the 12th century.
- An apple, symbolising their home venue, Orchard Park, which has an orchard next to it.
- A book and quill, symbolising Elphin as a place of learning.
- The motto Latin: Per Ardua surgo in spes, 'through adversity I rise in hope.'

== Honours ==
- Roscommon Senior Football Championship (15): 1889, 1891, 1901, 1902, 1903, 1904, 1905, 1931, 1932, 1937, 1950, 1951, 1955, 1956, 1957
- Roscommon Senior Hurling Championship (1): 1925
- Connacht Intermediate Club Football Championship (1): 2003
- Roscommon Intermediate Football Championship (3): 1979, 2003, 2024
- Roscommon Junior Football Championship (2): 1927, 1945

== Notable players ==
- Aidan Brady: Connacht SFC-winner (1952, 1953, 1961, 1962)
- Donal Keenan: All-Ireland SFC-winner (1943, 1944)
