= Castlerea St Kevin's GAA =

Gaelic games club in County Roscommon, Ireland

- CLG Naomh Caoimhín Chaisleán Riabhach
- Founded: 1968
- County: Roscommon
- Nickname: Kevs
- Colours: Green, White and Maroon
- Grounds: O'Rourke Park, The Demesne, Castlerea

Playing kits
Standard colours

Senior Club Championships
	All Ireland	Connacht champions	Roscommon champions
Football:	0	1	7

Castlerea St Kevin's GAA is a Gaelic Athletic Association club located in Castlerea, County Roscommon, Ireland. The club was founded in 1968 and its dominant sport is Gaelic football.

== Honours ==
- Roscommon Senior Football Championships: 1967, 1968, 1971, 1973, 2003, 2008, 2009
- Connacht Senior Football Championships: 1968
- Roscommon Intermediate Football Championships: 1987, 2023
- Connacht Intermediate Club Football Championships: 2023
- Roscommon Minor Football Championships: 1968, 1985, 1988, 1990, 2024
