= Strokestown GAA =

Gaelic football club, County Roscommon, Ireland

Strokestown
- Béal Átha na mBuillí
- Founded: 1881
- County: Roscommon
- Colours: Black and Amber
- Grounds: Tom Shelvin Park, Lisroyne, Strokestown
- Coordinates: 53.779154°N 8.113101°W

Playing kits
Standard colours

Senior Club Championships
	All Ireland	Connacht champions	Roscommon champions
Football:	-	-	11

Strokestown Gaelic Athletic Association is a Gaelic football and ladies' Gaelic football club based in Strokestown, County Roscommon, Ireland.

== History ==
The Strokestown club was founded on 13 October 1881, three years before the Gaelic Athletic Association itself.

In 1889 the local landlord, a J. Walpole, was expelled, and the club refounded as Strokestown Brian Boru's. Other clubs known as St Patrick's and Erin Go Breá were also founded. They were later unified under the St Patrick's name, and won eight county titles between 1912 and 1933.

A ladies' team was founded in 1976.

They did not win the county title again until 1992. They won it for a tenth time in 2002, advancing that year to the final of the Connacht Senior Club Football Championship where they were beaten by Crossmolina Deel Rovers.

The club crest was adopted in 2002 and depicts the "Bawn Gates" of Strokestown Park.

Strokestown also reached the final of the 2010 Connacht Intermediate Club Football Championship.

Their traditional local rivals are Elphin, although Clann na nGael have also been rivals in recent years.

== Honours ==
- Roscommon Senior Football Championship (11): 1912, 1915, 1916, 1917, 1922, 1926, 1928, 1933, 1992, 2002, 2022
- Roscommon Intermediate Football Championship (3): 1977, 2000, 2010, 2025
- Roscommon Junior Football Championship (5): 1949, 1961, 1971, 1999, 2001
- Roscommon Minor Football Championship (5): 1953, 1954, 1955, 1990,2012
