= Roscommon Senior Football Championship =

Annual Gaelic football competition

- Irish: Craobh Sinsear Peile Ros Comáin
- Founded: 1889
- Trophy: Fahey Cup
- Title holders: St Brigid's (20th title)
- Most titles: Clann na nGael (21 titles)
- Sponsors: Hodson Bay Hotel Group

The Roscommon Senior Football Championship is an annual Gaelic Athletic Association competition between the top Gaelic football clubs in County Roscommon. The winners of the Roscommon Championship receive the Fahey Cup and qualify to represent their county in the Connacht Senior Club Football Championship.

The 2025 Championship was won by St Brigid's who defeated Padraig Pearses by a score of 1-16 to 1-12.

Roscommon representatives have gone on to win the Connacht title on thirteen occasions. In 2013, St Brigid's became the first Roscommon club to win the All-Ireland Senior Club Football Championship.

== Roll of honour ==
#	Club	Wins	Years won	Runner-up	Years Runner-up
1	Clann na nGael	21	1961, 1966, 1970, 1976, 1977, 1979, 1981, 1982, 1984, 1985, 1986, 1987, 1988, 1989, 1990, 1991, 1993, 1995, 1996, 2015, 2018	6	1967, 1971, 1978, 1980, 1997, 2021
2	St Brigid's	20	1953, 1958, 1959, 1963, 1969, 1997, 2005, 2006, 2007, 2010, 2011, 2012, 2013, 2014, 2016, 2017, 2020, 2023, 2025, 2026	12	1957, 1962, 1973, 1979, 1982, 1983, 1984, 1989, 2000, 2002, 2003, 2018
3	Elphin	15	1889, 1891, 1901, 1902, 1903, 1904, 1905, 1931, 1932, 1937, 1950, 1951, 1955, 1956, 1957	15	1907, 1929, 1936, 1938, 1948, 1949, 1952, 1953, 1954, 1959, 1961, 1966, 1986, 2010, 2011
4	Roscommon Gaels	11	1962, 1972, 1974, 1975, 1978, 1980, 1994, 1998, 1999, 2001, 2004	10	1964, 1969, 1970, 1976, 1977, 1985, 1992, 2017, 2019, 2024
4	Strokestown	11	1912, 1915, 1916, 1917, 1922, 1926, 1928, 1933, 1992, 2002, 2022	8	1913, 1919, 1930, 1943, 1988, 1991, 1994, 1995
6	Castlerea St Kevin's	7	1967, 1968, 1971, 1973, 2003, 2008, 2009	5	1958, 1972, 1975, 1990, 1993
7	Tarmon	6	1935, 1939, 1940, 1941, 1944, 1947	3	1934, 1942, 1945
7	St Patrick's	6	1942, 1943, 1945, 1946, 1948, 1949	3	1941, 1947, 1951
7	Roscommon Town	6	1911, 1912, 1913, 1930, 1936, 1938	7	1903, 1904, 1924, 1926, 1931, 1932, 1937
10	Kilbride	5	1907, 1908, 1909, 1914, 2000	4	1905, 1910, 1916, 2004
11	Donamon	4	1918, 1919, 1920, 1925	1	1927
12	Padraig Pearses	3	2019, 2021, 2024	10	1963, 1968, 2005, 2008, 2012, 2015, 2016, 2021, 2025, 2026
13	Boyle	2	1890, 1927	3	1925, 2022, 2023
13	Tulsk	2	1923, 1924	5	1902, 1906, 1911, 1912, 1914
13	Fuerty	2	1929, 1934	1	1923
13	St Coman's, Roscommon	2	1952, 1954	6	1915, 1917, 1944, 1946, 1950, 1955
17	Kilbride Emmets/Elphin	1	1906	0	—
17	Tulsk	1	1910	0	—
17	St Coman's, Knockcroghery	1	1952	0	—
17	United Stars (Creggs/Oran)	1	1960	0	—
17	Shannon Gaels	1	1964	1	1965
17	St Faithleach's	1	1965	4	1981, 2006, 2007, 2014
17	Kilmore	1	1983	4	1987, 1998, 1999, 2001
24	Ballinameen-Martry	0	—	1	1891
24	Ballymurray	0	—	3	1935, 1939, 1940
24	Castlerea	0	—	2	1890, 1920
24	Clonown	0	—	2	1909, 1918
24	Creggs	0	—	1	1974
24	Croghan	0	—	1	1908
24	Eoghan Ruadh	0	—	1	1956
24	Kingsland	0	—	1	1889
24	Knockcroghery	0	—	1	1928
24	Michael Glaveys	0	—	1	1996
24	Na Fianna	0	—	1	1960
24	Oran	0	—	1	1933
24	Roscommon De Wetts	0	—	1	1901
24	Western Gaels	0	—	2	2009, 2013

== List of finals ==
Year	Winner	Score	Runner-up	Score
2026	St Brigid's	1-25	Padraig Pearses	2-16
2025	St Brigid's	1-16 (Replay); 1-15	Padraig Pearses	1-12 (Replay); 1-15
2024	Padraig Pearses	1-11	Roscommon Gaels	1-09
2023	St Brigid's	0-12	Boyle	0-11
2022	Strokestown	0-11	Boyle	0-10
2021	Padraig Pearse's	2-08	Clann na nGael	0-11
2020	St Brigid's	1-11	Padraig Pearses	0-08
2019	Padraig Pearses	2-10	Roscommon Gaels	1-10
2018	Clann na nGael	4-15	St Brigid's	1-12
2017	St Brigid's	3-13	Roscommon Gaels	3-07
2016	St Brigid's	2-14	Padraig Pearses	2-07
2015	Clann na nGael	1-09	Padraig Pearses	0-11
2014	St Brigid's	3-12	St Faithleach's	0-07
2013	St Brigid's	1-13	Western Gaels	0-09
2012	St Brigid's	2-08	Padraig Pearses	0-09
2011	St Brigid's	1-09	Elphin	0-07
2010	St Brigid's	0-14	Elphin	0-09
2009	Castlerea St Kevin's	0-10	Western Gaels	0-06
2008	Castlerea St Kevin's	0-12, 0-09 (R)	Padraig Pearses	1-09, 0-08 (R)
2007	St Brigid's	1-12	St Faithleach's	0-09
2006	St Brigid's	1-07	St Faithleach's	1-05
2005	St Brigid's	2-09	Padraig Pearses	0-11
2004	Roscommon Gaels	0-10	Kilbride	0-08
2003	Castlerea St Kevin's	1-09	St Brigid's	0-11
2002	Strokestown	2-11	St Brigid's	0-11
2001	Roscommon Gaels	0-12	Kilmore	0-08
2000	Kilbride	1-11	St Brigid's	1-08
1999	Roscommon Gaels	0-10	Kilmore	0-06
1998	Roscommon Gaels	0-15	Kilmore	0-09
1997	St Brigid's	1-08	Clann na nGael	1-07
1996	Clann na nGael	0-11	Michael Glaveys	1-06
1995	Clann na nGael	0-12	Strokestown	0-08
1994	Roscommon Gaels	0-12	Strokestown	0-06
1993	Clann na nGael	1-12	Castlerea St Kevin's	0-07
1992	Strokestown	1-10, 1-14 (R)	Roscommon Gaels	1-10, 0-10 (R)
1991	Clann na nGael	2-09	Strokestown	0-10
1990	Clann na nGael	4-13	Castlerea St Kevin's	2-04
1989	Clann na nGael	3-11	St Brigid's	1-01
1988	Clann na nGael	2-12	Strokestown	0-05
1987	Clann na nGael	3-09	Kilmore	0-07
1986	Clann na nGael	1-09	Elphin	0-05
1985	Clann na nGael	3-10	Roscommon Gaels	1-04
1984	Clann na nGael	0-07	St Brigid's	0-01
1983	Kilmore	1-08	St Brigid's	1-07
1982	Clann na nGael	2-14	St Brigid's	1-04
1981	Clann na nGael	2-05	St Faithleach's	0-06
1980	Roscommon Gaels	1-10	Clann na nGael	0-09
1979	Clann na nGael	0-06, 5-13 (R - AET)	St Brigid's	0-06, 3-09 (R - AET)
1978	Roscommon Gaels	2-07	Clann na nGael	0-08
1977	Clann na nGael	1-06	Roscommon Gaels	0-08
1976	Clann na nGael	0-08	Roscommon Gaels	0-04
1975	Roscommon Gaels	0-06, 1-13 (R, AET)	Castlerea St Kevin's	1-03, 2-07 (R, AET)
1974	Roscommon Gaels	2-10	Creggs	2-06
1973	Castlerea St Kevin's	0-10	St. Brigid's	2-02
1972	Roscommon Gaels	2-05	Castlerea St Kevin's	0-02
1971	Castlerea St Kevin's	2-11	Clann na nGael	1-02
1970	Clann na nGael	1-13	Roscommon Gaels	1-08
1969	St Brigid's	2-02	Roscommon Gaels	0-04
1968	Castlerea St Kevin's	2-08	Padraig Pearses	0-07
1967	Castlerea St Kevin's	1-07	Clann na nGael	1-06
1966	Clann na nGael	2-09	Elphin	1-06
1965	St Faithleach's	0-10	Shannon Gaels	1-06
1964	Shannon Gaels/Kilmore	2-03	Roscommon Gaels	0-06
1963	St Brigid's	2-14	Padraig Pearses	1-05
1962	Roscommon Gaels	1-11	St Brigid's	1-10
1961	Clann na nGael	2-08	Elphin	1-10
1960	United Stars (Oran/Creggs)	1-05	Na Fianna	0-03
1959	St Brigid's	0-12	Elphin	1-04
1958	St Brigid's	1-08	Castlerea St Kevin's	0-03
1957	Elphin	1-05	St Brigid's	0-05
1956	Elphin	2-08	Eoghan Ruadh	2-03
1955	Elphin	4-04	Roscommon St Coman's	0-01
1954	Roscommon St Coman's	1-01	Elphin	0-03
1953	St Brigid's	1-09	Elphin	0-03
1952	Roscommon St Coman's	0-04	Elphin	0-03
1951	Elphin	0-05	St Patrick's	0-04
1950	Elphin	2-06	Roscommon St Coman's	0-09
1949	St Patrick's	1-05	Elphin	0-04
1948	St Patrick's	2-09	Elphin	0-04
1947	Tarmon	2-13	St Patrick's	2-02
1946	St Patrick's	1-11	Roscommon St Coman's	0-06
1945	St Patrick's	1-09	Tarmon	0-06
1944	Tarmon	0-05, 0-06 (R), 2-07 (2nd R)	Roscommon St Coman's	0-05, 1-03 (R), 0-06 (2nd R)
1943	St Patrick's	3-03	Strokestown	1-03
1942	St Patrick's	2-07	Tarmon	0-06
1941	Tarmon	1-06, 1-09 (R)	St Patrick's	1-06, 1-05 (R)
1940	Tarmon		Ballymurray	
1939	Tarmon	4-11	Ballymurray	0-07
1938	Roscommon Town	2-02	Elphin	1-02
1937	Elphin	2-07	Roscommon Town	1-04
1936	Roscommon Town	4-06	Elphin	1-03
1935	Tarmon	5-07	Ballymurray	1-03
1934	Fuerty	2-07	Tarmon	0-06
1933	Strokestown	3-04	Oran	1-01
1932	Elphin	3-02	Roscommon Town	0-01
1931	Elphin	2-02, 2-05 (R)	Roscommon Town	1-05, 2-04 (R)
1930	Roscommon Town	1-06	Strokestown	1-02
1929	Fuerty		Elphin	
1928	Strokestown	1-05	Knockcroghery	1-02
1927	Boyle	2-07	Donamon	1-00
1926	Strokestown	2-03	Roscommon Town	1-00
1925	Donamon		Boyle	
1924	Tulsk	2-01	Roscommon Town	2-00
1923	Tulsk	3-03	Fuerty	2-02
1922	No Championship			
1921	No records			
1920	Donamon	1-02	Castlerea	1-01
1919	Donamon	3-03	Strokestown	2-03
1918	Donamon	2-03	Clonown	0-02
1917	Strokestown	3-03	Roscommon St Coman's	0-03
1916	Strokestown	2-01	Kilbride	1-00
1915	Strokestown		Roscommon St Coman's	
1914	Kilbride	0-02, 1-02 (R)	Tulsk	0-02, 0-01 (R)
1913	Roscommon Town	3-04	Strokestown	0-02
1912	Roscommon Town	1-01	Tulsk	0-00
1911	Roscommon Town	1-01	Tulsk	0-00
1910	Tulsk	1-02	Kilbride	1-00
1909	Kilbride		Clonown	
1908	Kilbride	2-03	Croghan	0-02
1907	Kilbride	0-07	Elphin	0-05
1906	Kilbride		Tulsk	
1905	Elphin O'Brien's	0-05	Kilbride	0-02
1904	Elphin O'Brien's	1-03	Roscommon Town	0-00
1903	Elphin O'Brien's	1-11	Roscommon Town	0-02
1902	Elphin O'Brien's	0-04	Tulsk	0-01
1901	Elphin O'Brien's	0-06	Roscommon De Wetts	0-00
1900	No Championship			
1899	No Championship			
1898	No Championship			
1897	No Championship			
1896	No Championship			
1895	No Championship			
1894	No Championship			
1893	No Championship			
1892	No Championship			
1891	Elphin	2-09	Ballinameen-Martry	0-00
1890	Boyle	1-01	Castlerea	0-00
1889	Elphin	0-03	Kingsland	0-00
