= Roscommon Gaels GAA =

Gaelic games club in County Roscommon, Ireland

Roscommon Gaels
- Gaeil Roscomáin
- Founded: 1959
- County: Roscommon
- Nickname: Da Gaels, Townies
- Colours
- Grounds: Lisnamult
- Coordinates: 53.621°N 8.208°W

Playing kits
Standard colours

Senior Club Championships
	All Ireland	Connacht champions	Roscommon champions
Football:	0	2	11
Hurling:	0	0	24

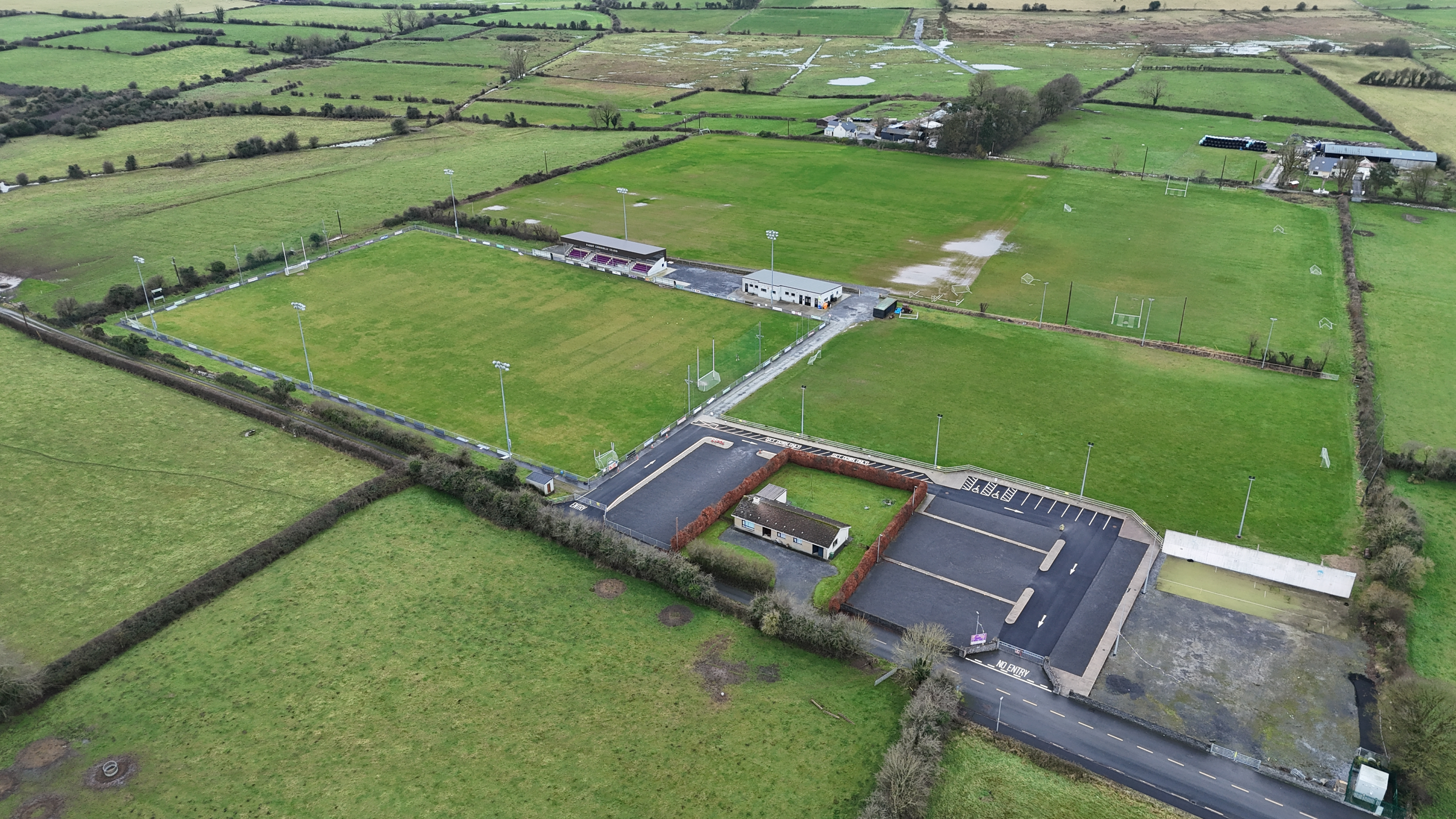
Grounds of Roscommon Gaels GAA club in 2024

Roscommon Gaels GAA is a Gaelic Athletic Association (GAA) club located in Roscommon in County Roscommon, Ireland. The club fields teams, in both hurling and Gaelic football, in competitions organised by the Roscommon County Board.

== History ==
The club was founded in 1959 as a result of a merger between two clubs, Eoghan Ruadhs and St. Comans. The club is a successor club to the numerous clubs that represented the Roscommon town area in the decades prior to this.

Prior to the development of its current club grounds at Lisnamult in the early 2000s, the club was based at Dr Hyde Park. In 2019, the club celebrated its 60th anniversary with the opening of new changing rooms at its Lisnamult grounds.

== Honours ==
=== Hurling ===
- Roscommon Senior Hurling Championships (24): 1902, 1903, 1904, 1913*, 1914*, 1915*, 1923*, 1924*, 1925*, 1931*, 1932*, 1933*, 1935*, 1936*, 1938*, 1944^, 1951^, 1952^, 1961, 1964, 1965, 1966, 1969, 1970
- Connacht Senior Club Hurling Championships (0): (runners-up in 1970)
- Roscommon Under-21 Hurling Championship (1): 2000

(* As 'Roscommon Town'; ^ As 'St. Coman's')

=== Football ===
- All-Ireland Senior Club Football Championships (0): (runners-up in 1976)
- Connacht Senior Club Football Championships (2): 1974, 1975
- Roscommon Senior Football Championships (11): 1962, 1972, 1974, 1975, 1978, 1980, 1994, 1998, 1999, 2001, 2004
