= Clann na nGael GAA (Roscommon) =

Gaelic games club in County Roscommon, Ireland

Clann na nGael
- Founded: 1936
- County: Roscommon
- Nickname: Clann
- Colours: Blue and Yellow
- Grounds: Johnstown
- Coordinates: 53°22′08″N 8°01′14″W

Playing kits
Standard colours

Senior Club Championships
	All Ireland	Connacht champions	Roscommon champions
Football:	-	7	21
Ladies' football:	–	1	4

Clann na nGael is a Gaelic Athletic Association club based in the southern end of County Roscommon, Ireland. The area comprises the two half parishes of Drum and Clonown, the parish being St Peter and Paul, Athlone. The club is the most successful in Roscommon in terms of titles won, with 21 Roscommon Senior Football titles, with the most recent in 2018.

== History ==
The Clann na nGael club was formed in 1936 when the clubs of Drum and Clonown amalgamated. Clann na nGael (also known as Clann) won their first ever county title, the Junior Championship, in 1940, and were promoted to Senior status. However, after an unsuccessful period at senior level, the club reverted to Junior in 1945. The club battled on and in 1954 won a second Junior Championship. That win was significant as it regained senior status, a ranking that Clann has not relinquished since.

Three Minor Championships were won in succession (1957–1959) and those young players, along with survivors from the 1954 side, went on to form the senior team that was to make history. In 1960, Clann na nGael commenced a run of success that brought seven County Senior League Titles in succession as well as five O'Rourke Cups. In addition, the Roscommon Senior Football Championship was captured for the first time.

Clann made their first-ever appearance in a Roscommon Senior Football Championship final in 1961 and made it a double day by beating Elphin.

A second county senior title was brought home in 1966 following another final win at the expense of Elphin. Clann lost to Castlerea in the 1967 championship but bounced back again in 1970 to claim title number three.

The senior county final of 1971 was again lost to Castlerea and then followed a few transitional years for the club.

The first juvenile title was won in 1969 at Under-13. This was followed by an Under-14 title in 1970 and Minor titles in 1973 and 1974. Again, those wins were of major importance as the teenagers of those years went on to play major roles in the future of the club.

Clann na nGael reached the senior county final of 1976 and upset the odds by beating a Roscommon Gaels side who were county and Connaught Champions at the time, and runners-up the previous year for the All-Ireland club title.

Since then, Clann na nGael won senior county titles won in 1976, 1977, 1979, 1981 and 1982.

The first Connacht Senior Club Football Championship was won in 1982 and defeat followed in the All-Ireland Senior Club Football Championship Final against Portlaoise, at Cloughjordan in County Tipperary. Clann were defeated early in the 1983 county championship, but the following year bounced back. Eight county senior titles were won in succession (1984–1991).

Clann na nGael also won six Connacht club titles in succession in that era (1984–1989) and appeared in four successive All-Ireland finals (1987–1990). During this period, Clann also captured the All-Ireland 7-A-Side crown in 1989.

Underage successes in the late seventies and early eighties contributed to the senior success story. The county Under-16 crown was won for the first time in 1978 and retained it the following year. A minor title in 1983 and Clann's first Under-21 in the same year were also achieved.

During the 1990s, Clann na nGael won further senior county titles in 1993, 1995 and 1996. At Under-21 level, following on from three county titles in the 1980s, the club secured two further titles in the following decade (1990, 1997).

Clann na nGael fields teams in every grade of football and are also leading the way in ladies' football. County senior champions in 1974, 1995, 1996 and 1997, the ladies were not to be out done by their male counterparts, and won the Connaucht Club Championship in 1995. Clann ladies also won the Junior County Championship in 1993, the Minor in 1995 and 1996, and the Under-16 in 1975, 1991 and 1993.

Johnstown pitch, the home of Clann na nGael, was developed and opened in 1971. In the early 1990s the grounds and clubhouse were re-structured and new dressing rooms, a function hall, training pitch and parking area were added and was officially opened by Jack Boothman, President of the GAA, on 27 August 1994.

== Honours ==
- Roscommon Senior Football Championship (21): 1961, 1966, 1970, 1976, 1977, 1979, 1981, 1982, 1984, 1985, 1986, 1987, 1988, 1989, 1990, 1991, 1993, 1995, 1996, 2015, 2018
- Connacht Senior Club Football Championship (7): 1982, 1984, 1985, 1986, 1987, 1988, 1989
- Roscommon Under-21 Football Championship (2): 2014, 2015
- Roscommon Under-20 Football Championship (1): 2016

== Notable players ==
- Tony McManus
- Donal Shine

== Notable managers ==
- Liam Kearns
