= 2012–13 All-Ireland Senior Club Football Championship =

Irish Football Championship

- Dates: 21 October 2012 – 17 March 2013
- Teams: 32
- Sponsor: Allied Irish Bank
- Champions: St. Brigid's (1st title); Darragh Donnelly (captain); Gearóid Cunniffe (captain); Kevin McStay (manager)
- Runners-up: Ballymun Kickhams; Davy Byrne (captain); Paul Curran (manager)

Tournament statistics
- Matches played: 31
- Top scorer(s): Dean Rock (1–26)

The 2012–13 All-Ireland Senior Club Football Championship was the 43rd staging of the All-Ireland Senior Club Football Championship since its establishment by the Gaelic Athletic Association in 1970–71. The competition began on 21 October 2012 and ended on 17 March 2013.

Crossmaglen Rangers entered the competition as defending champion; however, the club was beaten by St Brigid's in the All-Ireland semi-final.

St Brigid's defeated Basllysmun Kickhams by 2–11 to 2–10 in the final at Croke Park on 17 March 2013 to win the competition. It remains the club's only title.

Ballymun Kickhams's Dean Rock was the competition's top scorer with 1–26.

== Connacht ==
=== Quarter-final ===
28 October 2012 Quarter-final	Melvin Gaels	0-10 - 2-19	St Brigid's	Kiltoom
	E Mulligan (0-8, four frees), P McGurrin (0-1), S McGurrin (0-1).	Report	F Dolan (0-7, five frees, one 45), E Egan (1-1), E Sheehy (0-4), G Cunniffe (1-0), S Kilbride (0-2), R Blaine (0-1), D Dolan (0-1), D Kelleher (0-1), I Kilbride (0-1), A McInerney (0-1).

=== Semi-finals ===
11 November 2012 Semi-final	Ballaghaderreen	1-15 - 1-07	Curry	McHale Park
	B Regan (0-8, five frees), J Kilcullen (1-1); B Kelly (0-2), K Rogers (0-1), P Kelly (0-1), M Tyrell (0-1), J Dillon (0-1).		D Maye (1-1), A Marren (0-4, two frees), C Brennan (0-1), J Marren (0-1 free).

11 November 2012 Semi-final	Salthill–Knocknacarra	0-08 - 0-15	St Brigid's	Pearse Stadium
	S Armstrong 0-5 (3fs), T Burke, E O’Mahony (f), D Tierney 0-1 each.	Report	F Dolan 0-6 (5fs, 1 45), S Kilbride 0-5 (3fs), N Grehan, G Dolan, D Kelleher, D Donnelly 0-1.

=== Final ===
25 November 2012 Final	Ballaghaderreen	0-06 - 1-12	St Brigid's	McHale Park
	B Regan 0-2 (1f), D Drake, B Kelly, O Jordan, M Tyrell 0-1 each.	Report	S Kilbride 1-5 (4fs), F Dolan 0-3 (1f), R Blaine, I Kilbride, D Dolan, N Grehan 0-1 each.

== Leinster ==
=== First round ===
28 October 2012 First round	Killoe Young Emmets	2-07 - 2-04	St Anne's Rathangan	Pearse Park
	S McCormack (1-3), P Thompson (1-0), M Hughes (0-1), D Mimnagh (0-1); D McGoldrick (0-1), S Dowd (0-1).		F Simpson (1-0), P McCormack (1-0 og), R Barry (0-4).

28 October 2012 First round	Rhode	1-07 - 1-09	St Patrick's (Louth)	O'Connor Park
	N McNamee (1-5), M Dunne (0-1), B Darby (0-1).		K White (1-1), E Carroll (0-3), E Breen (0-2), E O'Connor (0-1), P Keenan (0-1), E White (0-1).

28 October 2012 First round	St Patrick's (Wicklow)	3-10 - 2-11 (aet)	Éire Óg	Aughrim Park
	A O'Malley 2-2, M Byrne 0-4f, P Earls 1-2, D O'Sullivan, T Kelly 0-1 each.	Report	E McCormack 1-6 (3f, 1 '45), S Rea 1-0, M Ware, B Carberry, E Ruth, B Hennessy, M Fitzgerald 0-1 each.

=== Quarter-finals ===
11 November 2012 Quarter-final	St Patrick's (Wicklow)	0-04 - 3-15	Portlaoise	Aughrim Park
	A O'Malley (0-3), M Byrne (0-1).	Report	C Boyle (1-2); B McCormack (1-2), B Fitzgerald (0-4), E Whelan (1-0), B Glynn (0-2); P Cahillane (0-2), A Kelly (0-1), C Rogers (0-1), S Nerney (0-1).

11 November 2012 Quarter-final	Killoe Young Emmets	2-13 - 0-08	Navan O'Mahonys	Pearse Park
	M Quinn (1-1, 0-1 45); S McCormack (0-4, 2f), S Kiernan (1-0); R McGoldrick (0-3), D McGoldrick (0-2), J McCormack (0-1), E Clarke (0-1), M Hughes (0-1).	Report	J Regan (0-3, 1f), S Bray (0-3, 2fs)), P Smyth (0-1), S Gillespie (0-1).

11 November 2012 Quarter-final	Sarsfields	1-12 - 2-06	St Patrick's (Louth)	St Conleth's Park
	R Cahill 0-4 (2fs); R Confrey 1-0, M Byrne, A Smith 0-2 each, C Tiernan, G White (f), D Nea, P Brennan 0-1 each.	Report	D Finnegan, C McCann 1-0 each, P Keenan 1f, E Carroll (2fs) 0-2 each, R Finnegan, K White (f) 0-1 each.

11 November 2012 Quarter-final	Mullingar Shamrocks	0-07 - 2-13	Ballymun Kickhams	Cusack Park
	C Curley (0-3), A Clinton (0-1), S Daly (0-1), D Daly (0-1), L Smyth (0-1).	Report	D Rock (0-8), T Furman (1-2), Davy Byrne (1-0), J Whelan (0-2); K Leahy (0-1).

=== Semi-finals ===
25 November 2012 Semi-final	Portlaoise	1-11 - 2-05	Killoe Young Emmets	O'Moore Park
	B Fitzgerald 0-3fs, B Smith 1-0, A Kelly, B McCormack 0-2 each, C Healy, C Boyle, B Glynn, P Cahillane (f) 0-1 each.	Report	S Kiernan, D McGoldrick 1-0 each, R McGoldrick 0-2, D Mimnagh, M Hughes, S McCormack (f) 0-1 each.

25 November 2012 Semi-final	Sarsfields	0-05 - 1-08	Ballymun Kickhams	St. Conleth's Park
	A Smith (0-2), R Cahill (0-2), P Brennan (0-1).	Report	D Rock (0-4), T Furman (1-0), K Leahy (0-1), Davy Byrne (0-1), J McCarthy (0-1); K Connolly (0-1).

=== Final ===
9 December 2012 Final	Portlaoise	0-08 - 0-11	Ballymun Kickhams	Cusack Park
	B McCormack, B Fitzgerald (2f), C Healy 0-2 each; P Cahillane (1f), B Glynn 0-1 each.	Report	D Rock (6f) 0-6; J Whelan (f) 0-2; T Furman, K Leahy, K Connolly 0-1 each.

== Munster ==
=== Quarter-finals ===
4 November 2011 Quarter-final	Kilmurry-Ibrickane	0-13 - 2-08	Dr Crokes	Quilty
	I McInerney 0-5 (5f), M McCarthy 0-2, P O ‘Dwyer, J Daly (1f), S Murrihy, S Hickey, E Coughlan (1f), N Downes 0-1 each.		C Cooper, B Looney 1-1 each, J Doolan 0-2, D Casey, J Buckey, C Brady, S Meyers 0-1 each.

4 November 2011 Quarter-final	Castlehaven	1-15 - 0-07	Dromcollogher/Broadford	Ahamilla Complex
	M Collins (0-5), B Hurley (0-4), S Nolan (1-0), S Hurley (0-3), P Hurley (0-1); A Cahalane (0-1); D Hurley (0-1).	Report	M Reidy (0-3), D McCarthy (0-1); J Stokes (0-1); M Brosnan (0-1), G Noonan (0-1).

=== Semi-finals ===
18 November 2012 Semi-final	Dr Crokes	1-14 - 0-06	Clonmel Commercials	Lewis Road
	C Cooper 0-8 (6f); C Brady 0-3 (1f); E Brosnan 1-0; L Quinn, D Casey, J Buckley, 0-1 each.		I Barnes 0-2; J Harney, R Carroll, S Kennedy, A Lonergan, 0-1 each.

18 November 2012 Semi-final	Castlehaven	1-05 - 0-07	Stradbally	Ahamilla Complex
	S Cahalane (1-0), D Cahalane (0-1), S Dineen (0-1), M Collins (0-1), S Nolan (0-1), B Hurley (0-1).	Report	N Curran (0-2), S Ahearne (0-2), D Grey (0-1); P Kiely (0-1), G Power (0-1).

=== Final ===
2 December 2012 Final	Dr Crokes	0-19 - 0-12	Castlehaven	Fitzgerald Stadium
	B Looney 0-7 (1 45), C Cooper (2fs), K O’Leary 0-3 each, J Buckley, J Doolan 0-2 each, D Casey, C Brady 0-1 each.	Report	M Collins 0-6 (4fs), D Cahalane 0-2 (1 45), B Hurley (f), S Dineen, S Cahalane, D Burns 0-1 each.

== Ulster ==
=== Preliminary round ===
21 October 2012 Preliminary round	Mullahoran	1-07 - 4-15	Errigal Ciarán	Breffni Park
	Enda O'Reilly (0-4), F Brady (1-0), Eddie O'Reilly (0-2), D Sheridan (0-1).	Report	T Canavan (1-2), D McDermott (1-2), B Horisk (1-1), P Harte (1-0), R McRory (0-3), D Harte (0-2); S Tierney (0-2); D Canavan (0-2), E McGinley (0-1).

=== Quarter-finals ===
4 November 2012 Quarter-final	Tempo Maguires	0-09 - 1-15	St Gall's	Brewster Park
	C McElroy (0-4), D Keenan (0-4), T Campbell (0-1).	Report	A Gallagher (1-0); C McGourty (0-3), Kevin McGourty (0-2), K Niblock (0-2), S Burke (0-2), M Kelly (0-1); S Kelly (0-1), T O'Neill (0-1); Kieran McGourty (0-1); M Pollock (0-1), K Stewart (0-1).

4 November 2012 Quarter-final	Ballybay Pearse Brothers	0-07 - 0-13	Kilcoo	St Tiernach's Park
	T Kerr (0-2), S McGuinness (0-2), H Malone (0-1), B McCabe (0-1), P Stuart (0-1).	Report	J Johnston (0-4), D O'Hanlon (0-3); P Devlin (0-2), N Branagan (0-1), P Greenan (0-1), D Kane (0-1); R Johnston (0-1).

4 November 2012 Quarter-final	Errigal Ciarán	0-11 - 0-10	Ballinderry	Healy Park
	T Canavan (0-5), B Horisk (0-3), C Tierney (0-1); Ciaran McGinley (0-1), D Harte (0-1).	Report	C Devlin (0-4), C Gilligan (0-2); D McGuckin (0-2), E. Muldoon (0-1), K McGuckin (0-1).

11 November 2012 Quarter-final	Crossmaglen Rangers	3-11 - 1-07	St Eunan's	Athletic Grounds
	A Kernan (1-2), O McConville (0-4), P Grant (1-0), K Carragher (1-0), D McKenna (0-2); P Hughes (0-1), T Kernan (0-1), C Cumiskey (0-1).		J Haran (1-0), R Wherity (0-3), M McGowan (0-1); L McMonagle (0-1), C Dunne (0-1), C Gibbons (0-1).

=== Semi-finals ===
18 November 2012 Semi-final	Errigal Ciarán	0-10 - 2-10	Crossmaglen Rangers	St Tiernach's Park
	T Canavan, D Canavan 0-3 (1f) each, R McRory 0-2, C McGinley, P Harte 0-1 each.	Report	O McConville 0-5 (3f), J Clarke 1-1, D McKenna 1-0, P Hughes, T Kernan, A Kernan, S Kernan (f) 0-1 each.

18 November 2012 Semi-final	Kilcoo	1-09 - 0-10	St Gall's	Athletic Grounds
	S Devlin 1-0, P Devlin (2f), D O'Hanlon 0-3 (1f) each, Gerard McEvoy, C Laverty, R Johnston 0-1 each.	Report	K Stewart 0-4, K Niblock 0-3, S Kelly, C McGourty, M Pollock 0-1 each.

=== Final ===
2 December 2012 Final	Crossmaglen Rangers	3-09 - 1-09	Kilcoo	Athletic Grounds
	O McConville (1-2, 1-0 penalty, 2f), A Kernan (1-1, 1f), K Brennan, (1-0), S Kernan (0-2), M Aherne (0-1); T Kernan (0-1); K Carragher 0-1, (A Cunningham (0-1).	Report	D O'Hanlon (0-4, 3f), A Devlin (1-0), P Devlin (0-3, 3f), D Kane (0-1), R Johnston (0-1).

== Quarter-final ==
16 December 2012 Quarter-final	Tír Chonaill Gaels	0-06 - 3-12	Dr Crokes	Emerald GAA Grounds
	K McMenamin (0-3, 0-1 free); E O’Neill (0-2 frees); P Sherry (0-1).	Report	C Brady (2-1); K O’Leary (1-2); C Cooper (0-4, 0-2 frees); L Quinn (0-1); J Buckley (0-1); B Looney (0-1); A Kenneally (0-1); D Casey (0-1 free).

== Semi-finals ==
16 February 2013 Semi-final	St Brigid's	2-07 - 1-09	Crossmaglen Rangers	Cusack Park
2:00pm	F Dolan 1-3 (0-2f), Conor McHugh 1-0, S Kilbride (0-2f), Cathal McHugh 0-2 each.	Report	J Clarke 0-3, P Hughes 1-0, K Carragher and A Kernan 0-2 each, J Hanratty and K Brennan 0-1 each.	Referee: Maurice Deegan (Laois)

16 February 2013 Semi-final	Dr Crokes	0-09 - 1-10	Ballymun Kickhams	Semple Stadium
3:30pm	D Casey 0-3 (0-1f), C Cooper 0-2, F Fitzgerald, C Brady, J Buckley, J Doolan 0-1 each	Report	D Rock 0-5 (0-3f), T Furman 1-1, P McMahon, D Byrne, D Byrne, J Whelan 0-1 each	Referee: M Duffy (Sligo)

== Final ==
17 March 2013 Final	St Brigid's	2-11 - 2-10	Ballymun Kickhams	Croke Park
3:00pm	S Kilbride 1-3, K Mannion 1-2, F Dolan 0-4 (0-1 '45) R Blaine and D Donnelly 0-1 each	Report	D Rock 1-3 (0-2f), P McMahon 1-0, T Furman, J Burke, J Whelan 0-2 each, K Connolly 0-1	Attendance: 28,928; Referee: Paudie Hughes (Armagh)

== Statistics ==
=== Top scorers ===
Overall

Rank	Player	Club	Tally	Total	Matches	Average
1	Dean Rock	Ballymun Kickhams	1-26	29	5	5.80
2	Frankie Dolan	St Brigid's	1-23	26	5	5.20
3	Senan Kilbride	St Brigid's	2-17	23	5	4.60
4	Colm Cooper	Dr Crokes	1-18	21	5	4.20
5	Oisín McConville	Crossmaglen Rangers	1-11	14	4	3.50
6	Chris Brady	Dr Crokes	2-07	13	5	2.60
6	Thomas Canavan	Errigal Ciarán	1-10	13	3	4.33
7	Aaron Kernan	Crossmaglen Rangers	2-06	12	4	3.00
7	Brian Looney	Dr Crokes	1-09	12	5	2.40
7	Mark Collins	Castlehaven	0-12	12	3	4.00

In a single game

Rank	Player	Club	Tally	Total	Opposition
1	Eric McCormack	Éire Óg	1-06	9	St Patrick's
2	Austin O'Malley	St Patrick's	2-02	8	Éire Óg
2	Senan Kilbride	St Brigid's	1-05	8	Ballaghaderreen
2	Niall McNamee	Rhode	1-05	8	St Patrick's
2	Emlyn Mulligan	Melvin Gaels	0-08	8	St Brigid's
2	Barry Regan	Ballaghaderreen	0-08	8	Curry
2	Dean Rock	Ballymun Kickhams	0-08	8	Mullingar Shamrocks
2	Colm Cooper	Dr Crokes	0-08	8	Clonmel Commercials
3	Chris Brady	Dr Crokes	2-01	7	Tír Chonaill Gaels
3	Frankie Dolan	St Brigid's	0-07	7	Melvin Gaels
3	Brian Looney	Dr Crokes	0-07	7	Castlehaven
