= 2011–12 All-Ireland Senior Club Football Championship =

Irish Football Championship

- Dates: 16 October 2011 – 31 March 2012
- Teams: 32
- Sponsor: Allied Irish Bank
- Champions: Crossmaglen Rangers (6th title); Stephen Kernan (captain); Tony McEntee (manager)
- Runners-up: Garrycastle; John Gaffey (captain); Anthony Cunningham (manager)

Tournament statistics
- Top scorer(s): Dessie Dolan (0-29)

The 2011–12 All-Ireland Senior Club Football Championship was the 42nd staging of the All-Ireland Senior Club Football Championship since its establishment by the Gaelic Athletic Association in 1970–71. The championship began on 16 October 2011 and ended on 31 March 2012.

Crossmaglen Rangers entered the championship as the defending champion.

On 31 March 2012, Crossmaglen Rangers won the championship following a 2-19 to 1-7 defeat of Garrycastle in the All-Ireland final replay at Kingspan Breffni Park. It was their sixth championship title overall and their second title in succession.

Garrycastle's Dessie Dolan was the competition's top scorer with 0-29.

== Connacht ==
=== Quarter-final ===
16 October 2011 Quarter-final	Glencar–Manorhamilton	2-07 - 1-15	Tourlestrane	Páirc Seán Mac Diarmada
	J Glancy (0-7, four frees), A Croal (1-0), A Hickey (1-0).		Brian Egan (0-6, three frees), G Gaughan (1-0); G McGowan (0-2), S Dunne (0-2), J Marren (0-1); D Dunne (0-1); A McIntyre (0-1), J Leonard (0-1); A Dunne (0-1).

=== Semi-finals ===
6 November 2011 Semi-final	St Brigid's	0-16 - 0-10	Tourlestrane	Markievicz Park
	S Kilbride (0-6, 0-3 frees), F Dolan (0-4, 0-3 frees), D Kelleher (0-2), C McHugh (0-1), P Domican (0-1), K Mannion (0-1), D Dolan (0-1).		B Egan (0-3), J Quinn (0-2 frees), G Gaughan (0-2), A Dunne (0-1), D Dunne (0-1), B Egan (0-1).

6 November 2011 Semi-final	Ballintubber	2-07 - 1-11	Corofin	McHale Park
	C O'Connor 2-3 (2f), M Hoban, A Dillon, D McGing J Gibbons ('45') 0-1 each.	Report	A O'Donovan 0-8 (7f), G Sice 1-1, M Lundy, K Comer 0-1 each.

=== Final ===
20 November 2011 Final	St Brigid's	0-11 - 0-10	Corofin	Kiltoom
	F Dolan 0-6 (4f, 1'45'), S Kilbride 0-4 (3f), C McHugh 0-1.	Report	A O'Donovan 0-4 (3f), M Farragher, K Comer 0-2 each, J Burke, M Lundy 0-1 each.

== Leinster ==
=== First round ===
13 November 2011 First round	Summerhill	0-11 - 2-15	St Brigid's	Páirc Tailteann
	B Ennis (0-4, all frees), S Dalton (0-2); P Rispin (0-1), A Kenny (0-1), M Byrne (0-1, free), C Gillespie (0-1); B Lyons (0-1).		P Ryan (0-5), P Andrews (0-5, one free), K Kilmurray (1-0), B Cahill (1-0), Mark Cahill (0-2, both frees); K Darcy (0-1), A Daly (0-1), L McCarthy (0-1 free).

13 November 2011 First round	Athy	1-08 - 1-05	Edenderry	St Conleth's Park
	D O'Keeffe 1-0, D Mulhall, P Dunne, C Reynolds (2f) 0-2 each, K Brophy, K Feely 0-1 each.	Report	K McGuinness 1-2, S Cullen, S Guing, D Kelly 0-1 each.

13 November 2011 First round	Portlaoise	2-12 - 1-14 (aet)	St Patrick's	O'Moore Park
	C Rogers 2-0 (1-0pen), B Fitzgerald 0-5 (4f), C Boyle 0-2, C Healy, T Fitzgerald, A Kelly, H Coughlan, P Cahillane (1f) 0-1 each.	Report	P Keenan 0-7 (6f), K White 1-0, R Finnegan 0-3, E Carroll 0-2, E O'Connor, D O'Connor 0-1 each.

=== Quarter-finals ===
13 November 2011 Quarter-final	Garrycastle	4-11 - 1-06	Longford Slashers	Cusack Park
	J Dolan (2-1), J Duignan (1-1, 1-0 free), A Daly (1-0), D Dolan (0-3, 0-1 free), D O’Shaughnessy (0-2); K Henson (0-1); T McHugh (0-1), D Harte (0-1), C Cosgrove (0-1).		M Nevin (1-1), M Smith (0-3, 0-2 frees), C Smith (0-2, 0-1 free).

20 November 2011 Quarter-final	Athy	1-13 - 1-03	Old Leighlin	St Conleth's Park
	J Eaton 1-1 (1-0p), L McGovern, C Reynolds (1f) 0-3 each, R Bell 0-2, K Feely, T Gibbons, D Mulhall, D O’Keeffe 0-1 each.	Report	S Kinsella 1-2 (1f), C Coughlan 0-1(f).

20 November 2011 Quarter-final	Portlaoise	1-14 - 0-12	Rathnew	O'Moore Park
	P Cahillane (3f), C Rogers (2f), 0-4 each, C Parkinson 0-3, B Gaynor 1-0, B McCormack 0-2, B Smith 0-1.	Report	L Glynn 0-6 (4f), T Gill 0-4 (3f), N Mernagh 0-2.

20 November 2011 Quarter-final	St Brigid's	1-20 - 3-08	Horeswood	Parnell Park
	P Ryan 0-6, P Andrews 1-3, K Kilmurray 0-4, K Darcy 0-2, C Mullins, M Cahill (f), L McCarthy ('45'), O McCann, B Cahill 0-1 each.	Report	D Shannon 1-7 (0-4f); D Murphy 1-0; P J Banville 1-0; C Deely 0-1.

=== Semi-finals ===
4 December 2011 Semi-final	St Brigid's	2-16 - 1-15	Portlaoise	Parnell Park
	P Andrews (1-4), K Darcy (0-4, three frees), P Ryan (1-0), J O'Loughlin (0-2); Mark Cahill (0-2, frees); B Cahill (0-1), C Mullins (0-1), A Daly (0-1), L McCarthy (0-1).	Report	B McCormack (0-4), A Kelly (0-4), C Parkinson (1-0); P Cahillane (0-3, frees), H Coghlan (0-1), C Rogers (0-1), B Fitzgerald (0-1, free), I Fitzgerald (0-1).

4 December 2011 Semi-final	Athy	1-06 - 1-10	Garrycastle	St Conleth's Park
	J Eaton 1-3 (2f); L McGovern, P Dunne, D Mulhall 0-1 each.	Report	D Dolan 0-4 (4f); G Dolan 1-0; J Dolan 0-2; P Mulvihill, T McHugh, S O 'Donohue, A Daly 0-1 each.

=== Final ===
18 December 2011 Final	St Brigid's	0-10 - 1-08	Garrycastle	O'Connor Park
	P Andrews (0-5, one free), J O’Loughlin (0-2); K Darcy (0-2, frees), G McIntyre (0-1).		D Dolan (0-5, one free), G Dolan (1-1), K Henson (0-1), A Cosgrove (0-1, free).

== Munster ==
=== Quarter-finals ===
6 November 2011 Quarter-final	Ballinacourty	0-07 - 3-13	Dr Crokes	Fraher Field
	G Hurney 0-3 (1f), S Briggs, C Keane, M Ferncombe, J Hurney 0-1 each.	Report	C Cooper 2-3 (1f), A Kenneally 1-1, D Casey 0-4 (1f), B Looney, J Doolan, J Buckley, C Brady, J Jones 0-1 each.

6 November 2011 Quarter-final	University College Cork	1-19 - 2-15	Monaleen	Cloughduv
	P Geaney 0-7 (0-4f), G O’Grady 1-4 (0-2f), J O’Sullivan 0-3 (0-2 ‘45), S O’Brien 0-2, M Hickey, D O’Sullivan, JB Spillane 0-1 each.		M Gavin 0-5 (0-2f), L Kavanagh 1-1, M Crowley 0-3 (0-1f), D Burke 1-0, G Collins (0-1f), J O’Brien 0-2 each, S Hickey, P Russell 0-1 each.

=== Semi-finals ===
20 November 2011 Semi-final	Dr Crokes	0-12 - 0-09	Kilmurry-Ibrickane	Fitzgerald Stadium
	C Cooper 0-4 (1f), K O’Leary, D Casey (1f) 0-3 each, J Buckley, C Brady 0-1 each.		E Coughlan, N Downes, J Daly (1f) 0-2 each, E Talty, M Hogan, I McInerney (1f) 0-1 each.

20 November 2011 Semi-final	Moyle Rovers	1-05 - 5-12	University College Cork	Ned Hall Park
	P Acheson 1-0, L Boland 0-2 (1f), A Campbell, S Carey and B Mulvihill 0-1 each.		P Geaney 2-5 (0-2f), S O’Brien 2-1, G O’Grady (0-5, 2f), G Ryan 1-0, M Griffin 0-1.

=== Final ===
4 December 2011 Final	Dr Crokes	3-14 - 2-10	University College Cork	Fitzgerald Stadium
	D Casey (2-3, three frees); B Looney, C Cooper (0-4 each); K. O’Leary (1-1); E Brosnan and A O’Donovan (0-1 each).		P Geaney (1-2, 2 frees), S O’Brien (1-0), B Coughlan (0-2), N Daly, S Kiely, W Kennedy, J O’Sullivan, M. Griffin, G. O’Grady (free) (0-1 each).

== Ulster ==
=== Preliminary round ===
16 October 2011 Preliminary round	Cavan Gaels	0-10 - 1-08	Glenswilly	Kingspan Breffni Park
	C McClarey (0-2), S Johnston (0-2, 2f), M Lyng (0-2), N Murray (0-1); K Meehan (0-1), D Sexton (0-1), E Reilly (0-1).	Report	M Murphy (1-2, 1 pen, 2f), G McFadden (0-3, 2f), D McGinley (0-1), K McFadden (0-1), C Bonner (0-1).

=== Quarter-finals ===
30 October 2011 Quarter-final	Dromore St Dympna's	0-12 - 1-11	Ballinderry	Healy Park
	E McCusker (0-7, 0-4 frees), P Montague (0-4, 0-2 frees); N Sludden (0-1).	Report	C Gilligan (0-6, 0-3 frees), M McIver (1-0), A Devlin (0-2), R Wilkinson (0-1); R Scott (0-1); E. Muldoon (0-1).

30 October 2011 Quarter-final	St Gall's	2-05 - 3-09	Crossmaglen Rangers	Casement Park
	K Stewart (1-1), M Pollock (1-0), CJ McGourty (0-3, 2f), K Niblock (0-1).	Report	A Cunningham (1-1), A Kernan (0-3, 2f), J Clarke, O McConville (1-0 pen, each), S Finnegan, J Hanratty, D McKenna, T Kernan ('45), S Kernan (0-1 each).

13 November 2011 Quarter-final	Roslea Shamrocks	2-05 - 1-15	Burren	Brewster Park
	Séamus Quigley (1-4, 1-0 pen, four frees), D Reilly (1-0), L Lynch (0-1).	Report	D O'Hare (0-5, three frees), P Poland (1-1), J McGovern (0-2), A McArdle (0-2); C McGovern (0-2), S Murdoch (0-2), C Murdoch (0-1);

13 November 2011 Quarter-final	Latton O'Rahilly's	0-10 - 0-09	Glenswilly	MacCumhaill Park
	S Coyle (0-3, one free), H McElroy (0-2, one free), O Lennon (0-2), A Farmer (0-1); O Duffy (0-1), S Fitzpatrick (0-1).		J Gibbons (0-2), N Gallagher (0-2); M Murphy (0-2), C Kelly (0-1); G McFadden (0-1), B Farrelly (0-1).

=== Semi-finals ===
13 November 2011 Semi-final	Ballinderry	1-10 - 0-17	Crossmaglen Rangers	Casement Park
	C Gilligan (1-5, 1-0 pen, 3f), R Wilkinson (0-3), A Devlin (0-1), R Bell (0-1).	Report	A Kernan (0-5, 4f), O McConville (0-4, 2f), S Kernan (0-3), M McNamee (0-2), T Kernan (0-2, 1f), J Clarke (0-1).

20 November 2011 Semi-final	Burren	1-10 - 0-11	Latton O'Rahilly's	Morgan Athletic Grounds
	S McArdle (1-1, 0-1 45), Conal McGovern (0-3), P Poland (0-2), S Murdock (0-1), A McArdle (0-1), K McKernan (0-1), D O'Hare (0-1 free).		S Coyle (0-3 frees), H McElroy (0-2 frees), O Lennon (0-2), N Duffy (0-2), D O'Brien (0-1), S Fitzpatrick (0-1).

=== Final ===
27 November 2011 Final	Crossmaglen Rangers	2-11 - 0-10	Burren	Morgan Athletic Grounds
	O McConville (1-2, 0-2 frees), T Kernan (1-1, ‘45’), A Kernan (0-2, both frees), A Cunningham (0-2); J Clarke (0-2), S Kernan (0-1, free), D McKenna (0-1).	Report	D O’Hare (0-7, 0-6 frees), K McKernan (0-1), C McGovern (0-1), J McGovern (0-1).

== Quarter-final ==
4 December 2011 Quarter-final	Fulham Irish	0-07 - 1-12	St Brigid's	Emerald GAA Grounds
	L Mulvey (2f), M Hughes 0-2 each, H Murphy (f), J Ryan, J Reilly 0-1 each.	Report	F Dolan 0-4 (2f), C McHugh 0-3, N Grehan 1-0, S Kilbride (2f), D Dolan 0-2 each, P Domican 0-1.

== Semi-finals ==
18 February 2012 Semi Final	St Brigid's	1-09 - 1-11	Garrycastle	Pearse Park
2:30pm	K Mannion (1-0), S Kilbride (0-3), Cathal McHugh (0-2), N Grehan, I Kilbride, Conor McHugh (0-1) each.	Report	D Dolan (0-7), J Dolan (1-1), J Duignan, P Dillon, G Dolan (0-1).	Referee: Joe McQuillan (Cavan)

18 February 2012 Semi Final	Dr Crokes	2-8 - 3-8	Crossmaglen Rangers	O'Moore Park
2:30pm	D Casey, C Brady (1-0) each, C Cooper (0-3), E Brosnan, A O'Donovan, A Kenneally, B Looney, J Doolan (0-1) each.	Report	A Kernan (1-3), S Kernan, M McNamee (1-0) each, O McConville (0-2), A Cunningham, J Clarke, D McKenna (0-1) each.

== Final ==
17 March 2012 Final	Garrycastle	1-12 - 0-15	Crossmaglen Rangers	Croke Park
3:30pm	D Dolan (0-6), P Mulvihill (1-1), J Dolan (0-2), P Dillon, J Duignan, A Browne (0-1) each.	and	O McConville (0-6), J Clarke (0-3), A Kernan, T Kernan (0-2) each, D McKenna, M McNamee (0-1) each.	Attendance: 25,412; Referee: R Hickey (Clare)

31 March 2012 Final replay	Garrycastle	1-07 - 2-19	Crossmaglen Rangers	Kingspan Breffni Park
3:30pm	D Dolan (0-4), G Dolan (1-0), C Cosgrove (0-2), D O'Shaughnessy (0-1).	Report	F Hanratty (2-1), O McConville (0-6), A Kernan, S Kernan (0-3) each, A Cunningham (0-2), J Hanratty, T Kernan, K Carragher (0-1) each.	Referee: M Duffy (Sligo)

== Statistics ==
=== Top scorers ===
Overall

Rank	Player	Club	Tally	Total	Matches	Average
1	Dessie Dolan	Garrycastle	0-29	29	6	4.83
2	Oisín McConville	Crossmaglen Rangers	2-20	26	6	4.33
3	Paul Geaney	UCC	3-14	23	3	7.66
4	Paddy Andrews	St Brigid's (Dublin)	2-17	23	4	5.75
5	Aaron Kernan	Crossmaglen Rangers	1-18	21	6	3.50
6	Colm Cooper	Dr Crokes	2-14	20	4	5.00
7	James Dolan	Garrycastle	3-6	15	6	2.50
7	Senan Kilbride	St Brigid's (Roscommon)	0-15	15	4	3.75
7	Conleith Gilligan	Ballinderry	1-11	14	2	7.00
7	Frankie Dolan	St Brigid's (Roscommon)	0-14	14	4	3.50

In a single game

Rank	Player	Club	Tally	Total	Opposition
1	Paul Geaney	UCC	2-5	11	Moyle Rovers
2	David Shannon	Horeswood	1-7	10	St Brigid's (Dublin)
3	Cillian O'Connor	Ballintubber	2-3	9	Corofin
3	Colm Cooper	Dr Crokes	2-3	9	Ballinacourty
3	Daithí Casey	Dr Crokes	2-3	9	UCC
4	Conleith Gilligan	Ballinderry	1-5	8	Crossmaglen Rangers
4	Alan O'Donovan	Corofin	0-8	8	Ballintubber
5	James Dolan	Garrycastle	2-1	7	Longford Slashers
5	Stephen O'Brien	UCC	2-1	7	Moyle Rovers
5	Francis Hanratty	Crossmaglen Rangers	2-1	7	Garrycastle
5	Paddy Andrews	St Brigid's (Dublin)	1-4	7	Portlaoise
5	Gavin O'Grady	UCC	1-4	7	Monaleen
5	Séamus Quigley	Roslea Shamrocks	1-4	7	Burren
5	James Glancy	Glencar-Manorhamilton	0-7	7	Tourlestrane
5	Paddy Keenan	St Patrick's	0-7	7	Portlaoise
5	Paul Geaney	UCC	0-7	7	Monaleen
5	Eoin McCusker	Dromore St Dympna's	0-7	7	Ballinderry
5	Donal O'Hare	Burren	0-7	7	Crossmaglen Rangers
5	Dessie Dolan	Garrycastle	0-7	7	St Brigid's (Dublin)

=== Miscellaneous ===
- Garrycastle won the Leinster Club SFC for the first time, becoming also the first club from Westmeath to win the provincial title.
