= 2010–11 All-Ireland Senior Club Football Championship =

Irish Football Championship

- Dates: 17 October 2010 – 17 March 2011
- Teams: 32
- Sponsor: Allied Irish Bank
- Champions: Crossmaglen Rangers (5th title); Paul McKeown (captain); Tony McEntee (manager)
- Runners-up: St Brigid's; Frankie Dolan (captain); Noel O'Brien (manager)

Tournament statistics
- Top scorer(s): Oisín McConville (2-27)

The 2010–11 All-Ireland Senior Club Football Championship was the 41st staging of the All-Ireland Senior Club Football Championship since its establishment by the Gaelic Athletic Association in 1970-71. The competition began on 17 October 2010 and ended on 17 March 2011.

St Gall's entered the competition as defending champion; however, the club was beaten by Crossmaglen Rangers in the Ulster Club Championship.

On 17 March 2011, Crossmaglen Rangers won the competition following a 2-11 to 1-11 defeat of St Brigid's in the All-Ireland final at Croke Park. It was their fifth championship title overall and their first title since 2007.

Crossmaglen's Oisín McConville was the competition's top scorer with 2-27.

== Connacht ==
=== Quarter-final ===
17 October 2010 Quarter-final	St Brigid's	0-21 - 0-04	Eastern Harps	Kiltoom
	S Kilbride (0-6), F Dolan (0-5), C McHugh (0-3), D O'Connor (0-2), Cathal McHugh (0-2), D Dolan (0-1); G Dolan (0-1), K Mannion (0-1).	Report	P Taylor (0-4).

=== Semi-finals ===
7 November 2011 Semi-final	Glencar–Manorhamilton	3-05 - 1-13	St Brigid's	Páirc Seán Mac Diarmada
	A Croal 2-2, J Glancy 1-2 (0-2f), J Gilmartin 0-1.	Report	F Dolan 1-4 (0-2f), S Kilbride 0-5 (0-1f), D Dolan, I Kilbride, K Mannion, J Tiernan 0-1 each.

7 November 2011 Semi-final	Killererin	0-09 - 1-05	Ballintubber	Tuam Stadium
	N Joyce (0-5, four frees), T Hughes (0-2); A Keane (0-1 a 45); G Butler (0-1).		P O’Connor (1-2, pen one free), A Dillon (0-2 frees), J Gibbons (0-1).

=== Final ===
21 November 2010 Final	Killererin	2-10 - 2-14 (aet)	St Brigid's	Tuam Stadium
	P Joyce (0-5, one free), G Butler (1-0), N Joyce (0-2, frees), M Boyle (0-1), D Mannion (0-1), A Keane (0-1, a 45).	Report	Cathal McHugh (1-1), S Kilbride (1-1), F Dolan (0-3, one free), D Donnelly (0-1), G Cunniffe (0-1), G Dolan (0-1), K Mannion (0-1); D Dolan (0-1); Conor McHugh (0-1), E Sheehy (0-1), D O'Connor (0-1), D Kelliher (0-1).

== Leinster ==
=== First round ===
24 October 2010 First round	Portlaoise	2-11 - 0-14	Moorefield	O'Moore Park
	C Rogers (1-3); B Fitzgerald (1-1), P Cahillane (0-4), B McCormack (0-2), Z Touhy (0-1).		C Kelly (0-4); P Murray (0-3), R Sweeney (0-3), K Murnaghan (0-1); D Whyte (0-1); Keith Duane (0-1), P Wolfe (0-1).

24 October 2010 First round	Garrycastle	0-13 - 1-09	Longford Slashers	Cusack Park
	D Dolan (0-8, 0-4 frees), P Dillon (0-1), R McGowan (0-1); M McCallon (0-1), S O’Donoghue (0-1), S Mulvihill (0-1).		C Smith (1-2, 0-2 frees), M Smith (0-5, 0-3 frees), D Sheridan (0-1), P Kelly (0-1).

24 October 2010 First round	Skryne	1-11 - 1-08	Rathnew	Pairc Tailteann
	I Davis 1-5, 1-0 penalty, four frees; P O’Rourke 0-2, one '45’; M Battersby 0-2; K Mulvaney 0-1; A Tuite 0-1.	Report	M Doyle 1-2, L Glynn 0-3; T Gill 0-2, one free; S Kavanagh 0-1.

=== Quarter-finals ===
7 November 2010 Quarter-final	Portlaoise	2-04 - 2-07	Kilmacud Crokes	O'Moore Park
	P Cahillane (1-1, 1-0 pen), T Fitzgerald (1-0), C Rogers (0-1), B Glynn (0-1), B Fitzgerald (0-1).		D Kelleher (1-1), C Dias (1-0), B Kavanagh (0-3, all frees), B O'Rorke (0-1, free), M Vaughan (0-1, free), P Burke (0-1).

7 November 2010 Quarter-final	Garrycastle	2-13 - 2-10	Mattock Rangers	Cusack Park
	P Mulvihill (2-2), D Dolan (0-4, two 45s, two frees), P Dillon (0-2, two frees), S Mulvihill (0-2), J Dolan (0-1), A Fox (0-1); A Browne (0-1);		D Reid (0-4, two frees); N Sharkey (1-0), A Reid (1-0), D Brennan (0-2), M Brennan (0-2), C Grimes (0-2, one free).

7 November 2010 Quarter-final	Skryne	0-12 - 0-10	Castletown	Pairc Tailteann
	I Davis (0-5, two frees); K Mulvaney (0-3), B Byrne (0-1), D McGoldrick (0-1); P O'Rourke (0-1, 45), M Battersby (0-1).		A Masterson (0-4, one 45), J O'Shaughnessy (0-2); C Carty (0-2, two frees); J Holmes (0-1), J Foley (0-1);

7 November 2010 Quarter-final	Old Leighlin	1-07 - 1-11	Rhode	Dr Cullen Park
	H Gahan (1-0), Séamus Kinsella (0-2, frees), C Coughlan (0-2, frees), P Hickey (0-2), S Daly (0-1).		N McNamee (1-6, 1-0 pen, four frees), N Darby (0-2), A Sullivan (0-2), P Kelleghan (0-1),

=== Semi-finals ===
21 November 2010 Semi-final	Kilmacud Crokes	0-13 - 0-10	Garrycastle	Parnell Park
	B Kavanagh (0-6, two frees), D Kellegher (0-2), K Nolan (0-2), B O'Rorke (0-1, free), L Ó hÉineacháin (0-1), M Vaughan (0-1).		D Dolan (0-4, one 45 and two frees), P Dillon (0-3, two frees), R McGowan (0-2), P Mulvihill (0-1).

21 November 2010 Semi-final	Skryne	1-10 - 2-11	Rhode	Pairc Tailteann
	I Davis (0-6, frees); K Mulvaney (1-1), A Tuite (0-1), P O'Rourke (0-1), M Battersby (0-1).		N McNamee (1-5, two frees), R Malone (1-0), N Darby (0-2), D Hope (0-1), A McNamee (0-1), A Sullivan (0-1), P Kellaghan (0-1).

=== Final ===
23 January 2011 Final	Kilmacud Crokes	0-15 - 1-07	Rhode	O'Moore Park
	B Kavanagh (0-5, 0-4f), D Kelleher (0-3), M Vaughan (0-2), C Dias (0-1); B McGrath (0-1), L Og O hEineachain (0-1), A Morrissey (0-1); P Burke Jnr. (0-1).	Report	P Kellaghan (1-0), N McNamee (0-3, 0-1 '45'), N Darby (0-2), A Sullivan (0-1); D Hope (0-1).

== Munster ==
=== Quarter-finals ===
7 November 2010 Quarter-final	Stradbally	0-07 - 0-04	Doonbeg	Fraher Field
	T Curran 0-2, N Curran (0-1f), A Ahearne (0-1f), S Cunningham, A Doyle, T Connors 0-1 each.	Report	S Ryan 0-3, D Tubridy 0-1 (0-1f).

7 November 2010 Quarter-final	Dr Crokes	2-13 - 1-03	Monaleen	Lewis Road
	C Cooper 2-5 (four frees); D Casey 0-5 (two frees); E Brosnan 0-2; B Looney 0-1.		M Crowley 1-1; M Gavin (one free), C Joyce-Power 0-1 each.

=== Semi-finals ===
21 November 2010 Semi-final	Nemo Rangers	1-12 - 1-05	Stradbally	Páirc Uí Rinn
	P Kerrigan 0-7 (four frees); D Kearney 1-1 (penalty goal); D Niblock, W Morgan, B O’Driscoll (free) and A Morgan 0-1 each.		R Aherne 1-0; N Curran 0-3 (two frees); S Aherne (0-2).

21 November 2010 Semi-final	Aherlow	0-09 - 2-11 (aet)	Dr Crokes	Leahy Park
	B Grogan 0-4 (0-1 free); S Moloney 0-3; B O’Brien, T Hanley, 0-1 each.		L Quinn 1-2; J Buckley 0-3; K O’Leary 0-3; A Kenneally 1-0; D Casey (free), C Cooper (free), B Looney, 0-1 each.

=== Final ===
30 January 2011 Final	Nemo Rangers	1-15 - 1-13	Dr Crokes	Mallow GAA Complex
	J Masters 1-3 (one free); P Kerrigan, B O’Driscoll (one free), A Cronin 0-3 each; D Niblock, D Breen, D Kearney 0-1 each.	Report	K O’Leary 1-4; D Casey (three frees) 0-3; C Cooper (one free) 0-2; A O’Donovan, E Brosnan, F Fitzgerald, B Looney 0-1 each.

== Ulster ==
=== Preliminary round ===
17 October 2010 Quarter-final	Kingscourt Stars	0-11 - 1-12	Naomh Conaill	Páirc Uí Raghallaigh
	R McCormack 0-5 (5f), B Reilly 0-3 (1f), J MacMahon, T Malone, C Smith 0-1 each.	Report	D Molloy 0-4 (1f), L McLoone 1-0, J O'Malley 0-3, D Gallagher 0-2 (2f), L Thompson, A Thompson, B McDyer 0-1 each.

=== Quarter-finals ===
31 October 2010 Quarter-final	Crossmaglen Rangers	1-12 - 0-09	St Gall's	Oliver Plunkett Park
	O McConville 1-6, A Kernan 0-2, D McKenna 0-2, McNamee 0-1, J McEntee 0-1.	Report	CJ McGourty 0-6, M Pollock 0-1, S Kelly 0-1, K Niblock 0-1.

31 October 2010 Quarter-final	Burren	1-12 - 0-05	Eoghan Rua	Pairc Esler
	S Murdock (1-3, 0-2 frees), E McGovern (0-4); Conal McGovern (0-2), J McGovern (0-1), C Murdock (0-1, free); E Toner (0-1).	Report	B McGoldrick (0-4, 0-3 frees), Ciaran McGoldrick (0-1).

31 October 2010 Quarter-final	Coalisland Na Fianna	1-10 - 1-07	Roslea Shamrocks	Healy Park
	T O'Hagan (1-1), P Toner (0-2); D Thornton (0-2), P Kane (0-1), B Toner (0-1), S Curran (0-1); P McNeice (0-1), J Curran (0-1).		Séamus Quigley (0-6), S Quigley (1-1).

31 October 2010 Quarter-final	Naomh Conaill	2-12 - 0-09	Clontibret O'Neills	MacCumhaill Park
	D Molloy (1-5, two frees, one 45), L Thompson (1-3), E Waide (0-1); J McLoone (0-1); L McLoone (0-1), D Gallagher (0-1, free).	Report	C McManus(0-7, five frees), V Corey (0-1), A Rooney (0-1).

=== Semi-finals ===
14 November 2010 Semi-final	Crossmaglen Rangers	1-11 - 2-07	Burren	Casement Park
	M McNamee 1-2, O McConville 0-3, T Kernan 0-3, A Kernan 0-1, S Finnegan 0-1, J Hanratty 0-1.	Report	S Murdock 1-5, D O’Hare 1-0, E McGovern 0-1, E McCartan 0-1.

14 November 2010 Semi-final	Coalisland Na Fianna	1-09 - 1-10	Naomh Conaill	Brewster Park
	P Kane (1-0), P McNiece (0-3, frees), J Curran (0-2, 45s), S Curran (0-2); B Toner (0-1), D Thornton (0-1, free).		D Molloy (0-5, 0-3 frees), D Gallagher (1-1, 0-1 free), J O'Malley (0-1), L McLoone (0-1), E Wade (0-1), J McLoone (0-1).

=== Final ===
12 December 2010 Final	Crossmaglen Rangers	2-09 - 0-10	Naomh Conaill	Kingspan Breffni Park
	O McConville (1-5, 0-4 frees), J Clarke (1-2), T Kernan (0-1), M McNamee (0-1).		D Molloy (0-4, frees), D Gallagher (0-3, 0-2 frees), B McDyre (0-2), L McCloone (0-1).

== Quarter-final ==
16 January 2011 Quarter-final	Neasden Gaels	0-05 - 1-08	Crossmaglen Rangers	Emerald GAA Grounds
	D Carty (0-4, all frees), M Toner (0-1).	Report	O McConville (0-5, 0-3 frees), F Hanratty (1-0), A Kernan (0-2, 0-1 free), M Ahern (0-1).

== Semi-finals ==
26 February 2011 Semi-final	St Brigid's	0-13 - 1-08	Nemo Rangers	Gaelic Grounds
	S Kilbride 0-6 (three frees); F Dolan 0-2 (one free); K Mannion, E Sheehy, G Cunniffe, I Kilbride, D Dolan 0-1 each.	[irishexaminer.com/sport/gaa/football/brigids-stun-13-man-nemo-146701.html Report]	J Masters 0-6 (five frees); S O’Brien 1-0; B O’Regan, A Morgan 0-1 each.

27 February 2011 Semi-final	Kilmacud Crokes	1-12 - 2-11	Crossmaglen Rangers	Pairc Tailteann
	B Kavanagh 0-7 (five frees); C Dias 1-2; L Óg Ó hÉineacháin, D Kellegher, M Vaughan 0-1 each.	Report	J Clarke 1-1; A Kernan 0-3 (three frees); F Hanratty 1-0; O McConville 0-2 (frees); M Ahern 0-2, T Kernan, J Hanratty, K Carragher, 0-1 each. Scorers for Kilmacud Crokes:

== Final ==
17 March 2011 Final	Crossmaglen Rangers	2–11 - 1–11	St Brigid's	Croke Park
	J Clarke 1–3, O McConville 0–6 (4f), A Cunningham 1–0, A Kernan (f), K Carragher 0–1 each	Report	S Kilbride 0–8 (5f), E Sheehy 1–0, Cathal McHugh, F Dolan, K Mannion 0–1 each	Referee: C Reilly (Meath)

== Statistics ==
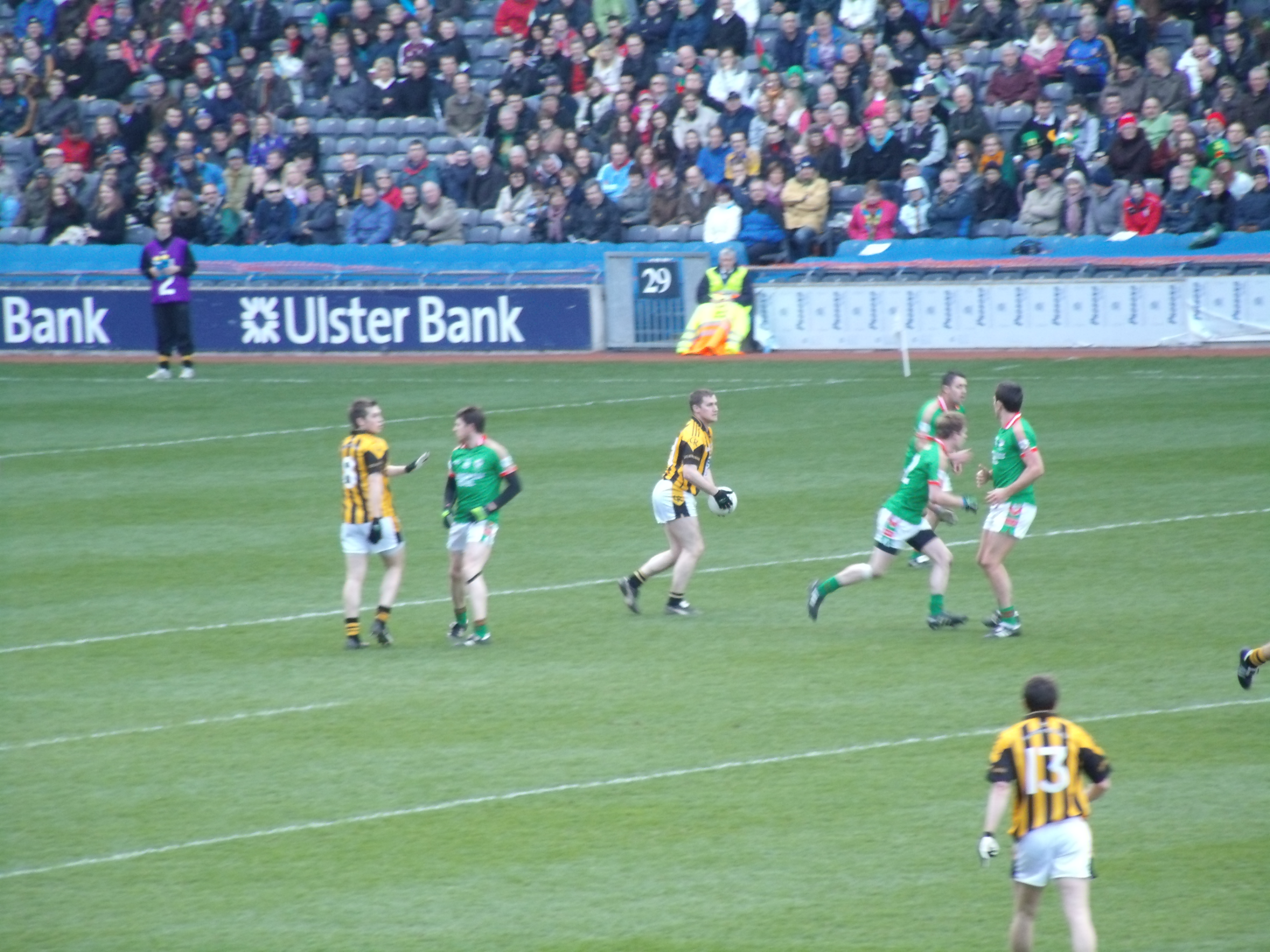
Action from the All-Ireland Club SFC final; Crossmaglen Rangers (black and amber) play St Brigid's (green and red); 17 March 2011, at Croke Park

=== Top scorers ===
Overall

Rank	Player	Club	Tally	Total	Matches	Average
1	Oisín McConville	Crossmaglen Rangers	2-27	33	6	5.50
2	Senan Kilbride	St Brigid's	1-26	29	5	5.80
3	Dermot Molloy	Naomh Conaill	1-18	21	4	5.25
3	Brian Kavanagh	Kilmacud Crokes	0-21	21	4	5.25
4	Niall McNamee	Rhode	2-14	20	3	6.66
5	Ian Davis	Skryne	1-16	19	3	6.33
6	Frankie Dolan	St Brigid's	1-15	18	5	3.60
7	Dessie Dolan	Garrycastle	0-16	16	3	5.20
8	Jamie Clarke	Crossmaglen Rangers	3-6	15	6	2.50
9	Seán Murdock	Burren	2-8	14	2	7.00
9	Colm Cooper	Dr Crokes	2-8	14	3	4.66

In a single game

Rank	Player	Club	Tally	Total	Opposition
1	Colm Cooper	Dr Crokes	2-5	11	Monaleen
2	Niall McNamee	Rhode	1-6	9	Old Leighlin
2	Oisín McConville	Crossmaglen Rangers	1-6	9	St Gall's
3	Adrian Croal	Glencar-Manorhamilton	2-2	8	St Brigid's
3	Paddy Mulvihill	Garrycastle	2-2	8	Mattock Rangers
3	Ian Davis	Skryne	1-5	8	Rathnew
3	Niall McNamee	Rhode	1-5	8	Skryne
3	Dermot Molloy	Naomh Conaill	1-5	8	Clontibret O'Neills
3	Seán Murdock	Burren	1-5	8	Crossmaglen Rangers
3	Oisín McConville	Crossmaglen Rangers	1-5	8	Naomh Conaill
3	Dessie Dolan	Garrycastle	0-8	8	Longford Slashers

=== Miscellaneous ===
- The Leinster Club SFC quarter final match between Portlaoise and Moorefield took place in O'Moore Park and not in St Conleth's Park where it was originally fixed for as Moorefield were serving a two-match ban from playing home games in the Leinster club championships following incidents in their previous provincial club campaign back in 2007. Moorefield were involved in a melee in their quarter-final game against Longford champions Dromard and although Moorefield won that game, Leinster Council hit them with a two-match ban from playing home games. The first game of that was the semi-final against Westmeath's Tyrellspass but Moorefield lost that encounter and hadn't been in the Leinster Championship since.
