= 2007–08 All-Ireland Senior Club Football Championship =

38th edition of All-Ireland Senior Club Football Championship

- Dates: 14 October 2007 – 17 March 2008
- Teams: 32
- Sponsor: Allied Irish Bank
- Champions: St Vincent's (2nd title); Tomás Quinn (captain); Mickey Whelan (manager)
- Runners-up: Nemo Rangers; Niall Geary (captain); Ephie Fitzgerald (manager)

Tournament statistics
- Matches played: 34
- Top scorer(s): Tomás Quinn (3-22)

The 2007–08 All-Ireland Senior Club Football Championship was the 38th staging of the All-Ireland Senior Club Football Championship since its establishment by the Gaelic Athletic Association in 1970-71. The competition began on 14 October 2007 and ended on 17 March 2008.

Crossmaglen Rangers entered the competition as defending champion; however, the club was defeated by St Vincent's in the All-Ireland semi-final.

On 17 March 2008, St Vincent's won the competition following a 1-11 to 0-13 defeat of Nemo Rangers in the All-Ireland final at Croke Park. It was the club's second championship title overall, and a first title since 1976.

Tomás Quinn of the St Vincent's club was the competition's top scorer with 3-22.

== Connacht ==
=== Quarter-final ===
14 October 2007 Quarter-final	St Mary's Kiltoghert	1-04 - 0-12	Tourlestrane	Páirc Seán Mac Diarmada
	R Mulvey 1–0, G Bohan 0–3 (2f), B O’Donnell 0–1.	Report	G McGowan 0–3 (2f), J Marren 0-2, T Henry 0–2, J Leonard 0–1, A McIntyre 0–1, G Gaughan 0–1, D Durkin 0–1, M Walsh 0–1.

=== Semi-finals ===
11 November 2007 Semi-final	Ballina Stephenites	1-08 - 1-04	Tourlestrane	James Stephens Park
	S Sweeney (1-0); P Harte (0-3), P McGarry (0-2), D Brady (0-1); G Brady (0-1), E Casey (0-1).	Report	G McGowan (1-3), M Walsh (0-1).

11 November 2007 Semi-final	Killererin	1-11 - 4-10	St Brigid's	Tuam Stadium
	P Joyce 1-9 (0-3f), N Joyce, J Keane 0-1 each.	Report	D O'Connor 2-3, F Dolan 0-4 (4f), Cathal McHugh, K Mannion (pen) 1-0 each, J Tiernan, S Kilbride, B O'Brien 0-1 each.

=== Final ===
25 November 2007 Final	Ballina Stephenites	2-08 - 0-12	St Brigid's	James Stephens Park
	S Hughes (1-1), P Harte (1-0), L Brady (0-3 frees), D Brady (0-2); G Brady (0-2).	Report	S Kilbride (0-4), F Dolan (0-2 frees), M O'Carroll (0-2), K Mannion (0-1); J Tiernan (0-1), C McHugh (0-1), P Kilcommins (0-1).

== Leinster ==
=== First round ===
21 October 2007 First round	Moorefield	0-15 - 0-08	Clongeen	Conneff Park
	P Murray 0-5 (3fs); P Wolfe 0-3 each; J Phillips, R Sweeney (fs) 0-2 each; M Treacy, F Hanniffy, K Murnaghan 0-1 each	Report	J Bennett 0-2; A Stafford, C Byrne, L Murphy (f), G O'Brien (f), S Bennett (f), T Bennett 0-1 each.

28 October 2007 First round	Éire Óg	3-09 - 1-08	Tullamore	Dr. Cullen Park
	S Rea 1-3, 1-0 pen, 0-2f, D Hayden 0-4, all frees, A Curran and E McCormack 1-0 each, B Carbery and A Byrne 0-1 each.	Report	S Dooley 1-6, 0-3f, S Martin 0-2.

28 October 2007 First round	St Vincent's	w/o - scr.	Baltinglass

=== Quarter-finals ===
11 November 2007 Quarter-final	St Vincent's	0-11 - 1-08	Seneschalstown	Parnell Park
	T Quinn 0-3, P Kelly 0-3, B Moloney 0-2, N Billings 0-1, K Golden 0-1, D Connolly 0-1.		J Sheridan 1-2, B Sheridan 0-5, R Ruddy 0-1.

11 November 2007 Quarter-final	Moorefield	1-12 - 1-12 (aet)	Dromard	St Conleth's Park
	P Murray 0-7, R Sweeney 1-3, C Kelly 0-2.		F McGee 1-6, J Martin 0-4, C Mimnagh 0-1, E McIntire 0-1.

11 November 2007 Quarter-final	Éire Óg	0-11 - 2-06	Tyrrellspass	Dr Cullen Park
	D Hayden 0-5, S Rea 0-4, E McCormack 0-2.		David Glennon 1-1, K Scally 1-0, Denis Glennon 0-3, P Sheridan 0-1, K Connell 0-1.

11 November 2007 Quarter-final	St Patrick's	0-05 - 1-14	Portlaoise	Dundalk
	D Connor 0-3, C Goss 0-1, K White 0-1.		P McNulty 0-5, B Fitzgerald 0-4, D Reddin 1-0, B McCormack 0-3, K Fitzpatrick 0-2.

18 November 2007 Quarter-final replay	Dromard	0-12 - 0-12	Moorefield	Pearse Park
	J Martin (0-4, 1f), E McEntire (0-2), F McGee (0-2, 1f), D Masterson (0-2), Damien Sheridan (0-1, '45'), C Mimnagh (0-1).	Report	P Murray (0-4, 2f), C Kelly (0-2), R Sweeney (0-2, f), P Wolfe, F Hannify, D Flynn and M Tracey (0-1, each).

18 November 2007 Quarter-final replay	Seneschalstown	0-10 - 1-12	St Vincent's	Páirc Tailteann
	B Sheridan 0-6 (6f), B Clarke 0-2, J Sheridan and G Conlon 0-1 each.	Report	T Quinn 1-3 (2f), K Golden 0-3, T Diamond and D Connolly 0-2 each N Billings and B Maloney 0-1 each.

25 November 2007 Quarter-final second replay	Moorefield	0-13 - 0-07	Dromard	St Conleth's Park
	M Tracey 0-4, C Kelly 0-3, J Phillips 0-2, P Murray 0-2 (1f), D Whyte 0-1, R Sweeney 0-1 (f).	Report	J Martin 0-4 (3f), F McGee 0-2 (2f), E McEntire 0-1.

=== Semi-finals ===
25 November 2007 Semi-final	St Vincent's	3-13 - 1-08	Portlaoise	Parnell Park
	T Quinn 1-5 (0-4f), D Connolly 0-4, B Maloney, P Gilroy 1-1 each, K Golden (f), C Brady 0-1 each.	Report	B Fitzgerald 1-3 (0-3f), Z Tuohy ('45'), S McManus, C Parkinson, B McCormack, C Rogers 0-1 each.

9 December 2007 Semi-final	Tyrrellspass	1-07 - 0-07	Moorefield	Cusack Park
	Denis Glennon 1-4, M Flanagan 0-3.	Report	P Murray 0-4 (2f), R Sweeney (1f), N Hurley-Lynch, D Barry 0-1 each.

=== Final ===
16 December 2007 Final	Tyrrellspass	0-07 - 2-08	St Vincent's	Cusack Park
	M Flanagan 0-3 (1f), David Glennon 0-2f, Denis Glennon 0-1, K Connell 0-1f.	Report	K Golden 1-2, P Gilroy 1-1, B Maloney 0-3 (1f), T Quinn 0-2f.

== Munster ==
=== Quarter-finals ===
11 November 2007 Quarter-final	Nemo Rangers	1-14 - 2-06	Moyle Rovers	Páirc Uí Chaoimh
	J Masters 0-8 (0-4 frees, 0-1 45); P Kerrigan 1-2 (0-1 free); D Kearney, R Kenny, D Niblock, P Morgan 0-1 each.	Report	D Browne 0-4 (0-2 frees); M Cronin 1-0 (og); P Kelly 1-0; D Lyne, P Shanahan 0-1 each.

11 November 2007 Quarter-final	Lissycasey	1-05 - 1-09	Kilcummin	Cusack Park
	D Lynch 1-0, C Lynch, T Kelly, M Slowey, M Daly (f), P Nagle 0-1 each.	Report	D Brosnan 1-1, DJ Fleming (3 f), SB O'Doherty 0-3 each, D O'Leary, R O'Connor (0-1) each.

=== Semi-finals ===
25 November 2007 Semi-final	Ballylanders	2-09 - 2-15	Nemo Rangers	FitzGerald Park, Kilmallock
	K O’Callaghan 1-5 (1-0 pen, 0-5 frees); Stephen Fox 1-0; D Murphy, J Murphy 0-2 each.	Report	P Kerrigan 0-5 (0-2 frees); R Kenny 1-2; D Kearney, J Masters (0-2 frees) 0-3 each; P Morgan 1-0; A Cronin 0-2.

25 November 2007 Semi-final	Kilcummin	0-08 - 2-06	Ballinacourty	FitzGerald Stadium
	DJ Fleming 0-4 (0-3 frees), D Brosnan 0-2 frees, K Gorman and S B O'Doherty 0-1 each.	Report	P Hurney 1-1, J Phelan 1-0, D Fives 0-3 (0-1 free), S O'Hare and G Hurney 0-1 each.

=== Final ===
9 December 2007 Final	Nemo Rangers	1-10 - 1-07	Ballinacourty	FitzGerald Stadium
	J Masters 0-5 (0-1 free, 0-1 45); D Kearney 1-0; P Kerrigan 0-3 (0-2 free); A Cronin, R Kenny 0-1 each.	Report	G Hurney 1-1; D Fives 0-3 (0-2 frees, 0-1 45); R Foley, M Fives, S O’Hare 0-1 each.

== Ulster ==
=== Preliminary round ===
21 October 2007 Quarter-final	Cavan Gaels	0-08 - 0-07	St Eunan's	Breffni Park
	S Johnston 0-4, M Lyng 0-2, M Dunne 0-1.		P McGowan 0-3, C Dunne 0-1, M McGowan 0-1, D McGinley 0-1, R Wherrity 0-1.

=== Quarter-finals ===
4 November 2007 Quarter-final	St Gall's	0-13 - 0-08	Cavan Gaels	Casement Park
	K Stewart 0-3 (0-2f), T O'Neill 0-2, K McGourty 0-2), K Niblock 0-2, P Veronica 0-1, A Healy, C McGourty, CJ McGourty 0-1 each.	Report	M Lyng 0-3 (0-1f, 0-1 '45'), A Forde 0-2, S Johnston 0-2f, K Downes 0-1.

4 November 2007 Quarter-final	Clontibret O'Neills	1-07 - 1-08	Crossmaglen Rangers	St Tiernach's Park
	V Corey 1-2, c McManus 0-2, P Duffy, D Mone, F Mone 0-1 each.	Report	O McConville 1-3, M Aherne 0-2, A Kernan, J McEntee, T kernan 0-1 each.

4 November 2007 Quarter-final	Dromore St Dympna's	1-10 - 0-13	Mayobridge	Healy Park
	C McCullagh 0-5, R McNabb 1-0, Sean O'Neill 0-3, Shaun O'Neill 0-1, E McCusker 0-1.		B Coulter 0-4, M Walsh 0-3, N Sexton 0-2, J Caldwell 0-2, A Barry 0-1, C Magee 0-1.

4 November 2007 Quarter-final	Glenullin	1-15 - 1-08	Newtownbutler	Celtic Park
	P Bradley 1-3 (0-2 frees), R Boylan 0-5, (0-3 frees), E Bradley 0-4, G O'Kane 0-2, D Boylan 0-1.	Report	C Monogan 0-4, (0-2 frees), F Mulligan 1-0, B Connolly 0-2, K Connolly 0-1.

11 November 2007 Quarter-final replay	Mayobridge	1-07 - 1-09	Dromore St Dympna's	Páirc Esler
	C Garvey (1-0), M Walsh (0-3), R Sexton (0-1); N Sexton (0-1), A Barry (0-1).	Report	Shaun O'Neill (0-6), C O'Neill (1-0), E McCusker (0-2), S Fitzpatrick (0-1).

=== Semi-finals ===
18 November 2007 Semi-final	Crossmaglen Rangers	2-06 - 0-11	Dromore St Dympna's	St Tiernach's Park
	M Aherne 2-0, T Kernan 0-2 (1 45), O McConville (f), M McNamee, J McEntee, A Kernan (f) all 0-1 each.	Report	C McCullagh 0-3 (3f), R McMenamin, E McCusker 0-2 each, S McDonnell, K O'Brien, Shaun O'Neill, S McMahon all 0-1 each.

18 November 2007 Semi-final	St Gall's	0-11 - 0-07	Glenullin	Healy Park
	K Niblock 0-3, C McGourty 0-2, M McCrory 0-2, T O'Neill 0-2, A Healy 0-1, K Stewart 0-1.		P Bradley 0-4, R Boylan 0-1, D Hasson 0-1, E Bradley 0-1.

=== Final ===
25 November 2007 Final	St Gall's	1-06 - 1-09	Crossmaglen Rangers	Páirc Esler
	A Gallagher 1-0; K McGourty 0-2; C McGourty 0-2 frees; K Stewart and T O’Neill 0-1 each.	Report	O McConville 1-5 (0-3 frees); A Kernan 0-2 (0-1 free); M McNamee and T Kernan 0-1 each.

== Quarter-final ==
27 January 2008 Quarter-final	Tír Chonaill Gaels	0-06 - 0-10	Crossmaglen Rangers	Emerald GAA Grounds
	D Kinneavy 0-5 (0-1f), J O'Connell 0-1.	Report	O McConville 0-3 (0-1f), M McNamee, T Kernan 0-2 each, B McKeown, M Aherne and S Kernan 0-1 each.

== Semi-finals ==
24 February 2008 Semi-final	Nemo Rangers	0-14 - 1-04	Ballina Stephenites	Cusack Park
	J Masters 0-7 (2 '45), P Kerrigan 0-3, D Meighan 0-2, B O'Regan, D Kearney 0-1 each.	Report	E Devenney 1-0, L Brady 0-2 (1f), S Hughes, D Brady 0-1 each.

24 February 2008 Semi-final	St Vincent's	2-09 - 0-11	Crossmaglen Rangers	Páirc Tailteann
	T Quinn 1-2 (2f), D Connolly 0-4, B Maloney 1-1, T Diamond, M O'Shea both 0-1 each.	Report	O McConville 0-4 (4f), S Kernan 0-2, J Murtagh, T Kernan, A Kernan, T McEntee, J McEntee 0-1 each.

== Final ==
17 March 2008 Final	St Vincent's	1-11 - 0–13	Nemo Rangers	Croke Park
	T Quinn 0-7 (5f), D Connolly 1-2, T Diamond, H Coughlan 0-1 each.	Report	J Masters 0-6 (3f), D Mehigan, P Kerrigan (2f), A Cronin 0-2 each, D Kearney 0-1 each.	Referee: Joe McQuillan (Cavan)

== Statistics ==
=== Top scorers ===
Overall

Rank	Player	Club	Tally	Total	Matches	Average
1	Tomás Quinn	St Vincent's	3-22	31	6	5.16
2	James Masters	Nemo Rangers	0-29	29	5	5.80
3	Oisín McConville	Crossmaglen Rangers	2-16	22	5	4.40
3	Patrick Murray	Moorefield	0-22	22	5	4.40
4	Paul Kerrigan	Nemo Rangers	1-15	18	5	5.80
5	Diarmuid Connolly	St Vincent's	1-13	16	6	2.66
6	Brian Maloney	St Vincent's	2-08	14	6	2.33
7	Francis McGee	Dromard	1-10	13	3	4.33
8	Pádraic Joyce	Killererin	1-09	12	1	12.00
8	Ronan Sweeney	Moorefield	1-09	12	5	2.40
8	James Martin	Dromard	0-12	12	4	3.00

In a single game

Rank	Player	Club	Tally	Total	Opposition
1	Pádraic Joyce	Killererin	1-09	12	St Brigid's
2	David O'Connor	St Brigid's	2-03	9	Killererin
2	Shane Dooley	Tullamore	1-06	9	Éire Óg
2	Francis McGee	Dromard	1-06	9	Moorefield
3	Tomás Quinn	St Vincent's	1-05	8	Portlaoise
3	Kieran O'Callaghan	Ballylanders	1-05	8	Nemo Rangers
3	Oisín McConville	Crossmaglen Rangers	1-05	8	St Gall's
3	James Masters	Nemo Rangers	0-08	8	Moyle Rovers
4	Denis Glennon	Tyrrellspass	1-04	7	Moorefield
4	Patrick Murray	Moorefield	0-07	7	Dromard
4	James Masters	Nemo Rangers	0-07	7	Ballina Stephenites
4	Tomás Quinn	St Vincent's	0-07	7	Nemo Rangers

=== Miscellaneous ===
- Wexford champions Clongeen forfeited home advantage in their preliminary round tie with Moorefield in order to get the game brought forward by a week to facilitate star player Paddy Colfer’s stag party in Edinburgh.
- Wicklow champions Baltinglass did not compete this year due to the late finish of their county championships.
- The Leinster Club SFC quarter-finals brought a bizarre refereeing gaffe which brought a premature end to the match between St Vincent's and Seneschalstown in Parnell Park. The Dublin champions equalized in the final minute of normal time, before referee Eugene Murtagh blew for full-time shortly afterwards although extra-time had been scheduled. Both teams left the field and the spectators departed, and though a prominent refereeing official attempted to signal the mistake to Murtagh, the message wasn’t delivered in time. With the other quarter-final clash of Moorefield and Dromard at St Conleth's Park going to extra-time, the error was accentuated.
- After their Leinster Club SFC quarter-final second replay tie with Dromard, Moorefield were hit with three player bans and stripped of home advantage in their next two Leinster club matches for their part in a brawl which broke out on the pitch towards the end of their tie. The first of these two matches were against Tyrrellspass and the next was in 2010 against Portlaoise, the next time they qualified for the Leinster SFC.
