= Gary Cox (Gaelic footballer) =

Irish Gaelic footballer

Personal information
- Nickname: Coxy
- Born: County Roscommon, Ireland
- Height: 1.81 m (5 ft 11 in)

Sport
- Sport: Gaelic Football
- Position: Centre forward
Clubs
- Years: Club
- 2012–2017: St Faithleachs; Salthill–Knocknacarra
Club titles
- Galway titles: 1
Inter-county
- Years: County
- 2001–2010: Roscommon
Inter-county titles
- Connacht titles: 1

Gary Cox is a Gaelic footballer from County Roscommon, Ireland. He first came to prominence with the Roscommon Junior team that won Connacht and All Ireland titles in 2000 along with future Senior stars like Karol Mannion and Shane Curran. The following year he was part of the Roscommon side that won the Connacht Senior Football Championship. He plays his club football with the St Faithleach's club. As well as representing his country in the 2003 International Rules Series in Australia, he has played for NUIG in the Sigerson Cup, and Connacht in the Railway Cup.

Cox transferred to Galway city club Salthill–Knocknacarra in 2012, helping them to a county title in the same year.
