= 2006–07 All-Ireland Senior Club Football Championship =

Irish Football Championship

- Dates: 15 October 2006 – 1 April 2007
- Teams: 32
- Sponsor: Allied Irish Bank
- Champions: Crossmaglen Rangers (4th title); John McEntee (captain); Donal Murtagh (manager)
- Runners-up: Dr Crokes; James Fleming (captain); Pat O'Shea (manager)

Tournament statistics
- Matches played: 38
- Top scorer(s): Colm Cooper (6-23)

The 2006–07 All-Ireland Senior Club Football Championship was the 37th staging of the All-Ireland Senior Club Football Championship since its establishment by the Gaelic Athletic Association in 1970-71. The competition began on 15 October 2006 and ended on 1 April 2007.

The defending champion was Salthill–Knocknacarra; however, the club did not qualify after being beaten by Corofin in the second round of the 2006 Galway County Championship.

On 1 April 2007, Crossmaglen Rangers won the competition, following a 0–13 to 1–5 defeat of Dr Crokes in the All-Ireland final replay at O'Moore Park. It was their fourth championship title overall and their first title since 2000.

Colm Cooper of the Dr Crokes club was the competition's top scorer with 6-23.

== Team changes ==
There were no representatives from the Kilkenny County Championship for the first time ever, as the Kilkenny County Board decided to regrade and enter their championship-winning team (Erin's Own) into the Leinster Intermediate Club Football Championship.

== Connacht ==
=== Quarter-final ===
15 October 2006 Quarter-final	St Brigid's	1-09 - 1-08	Curry	Dr Hyde Park
	F Dolan 0-5, D O'Connor 1-0, K Mannion 0-2, M O'Carroll 0-1, S Kilbride 0-1.		A Marren 1-3, S Davey 0-2, K Morley 0-2, J Marren 0-1.

=== Semi-finals ===
12 November 2006 Semi-final	St Brigid's	0-13 - 1-06	Crossmolina Deel Rovers	Dr Hyde Park
	D O'Donnor 0-5 (4f), F Dolan 0-3 (3f), J Tiernan 0-2, K Mannion, B O'Brien and Cathal McHugh 0-1 each.	Report	C McDonald 0-6 (5fs), D Keating 1-0.

12 November 2006 Semi-final	Mohill	1-02 - 1-11	Corofin	St Mary's Park
	S Conaty 1-0, C Beirne 0-1, S McCrann 0-1.		K Comer 0-4, T Burke 1-0, D Morris 0-2, G Sice 0-2, A Donnellan 0-1, T Costello 0-1, E Killeen 0-1.

=== Final ===
26 November 2006 Final	St Brigid's	1-10 - 3-03	Corofin	Dr Hyde Park
	M O'Carroll 0-3, K Mannion 1-0, B O'Brien 0-2, S Kilbride, P Kilcommins, J Tiernan, R Kelly, F Dolan (f) 0-1 each.	Report	A Donnellan, G Higgins, A O'Donovan (pen) 1-0 each, T Costello 0-2 (1f), K Comer 0-1.

== Leinster ==
=== First round ===
22 October 2006 First round	St Patrick's	0-08 - 0-12	Moorefield	Aughrim County Ground
	P Earls 0-5, D Smullen 0-2, J Slattery 0-1.	Report	P Murray 0-5, K Duane, R Glavin, D Flynn, M Tracey, R Sweeney, P Woulfe, D Whyte 0-1 each.

29 October 2006 First round	Wolfe Tones	0-12 - 0-06	St Joseph's	Páirc Tailteann
	C Ward 0-5, J Tiernan 0-2, N McLoughlin 0-1, D McGrath 0-1, G Beggy 0-1, S Corrigan 0-1, D O'Neill 0-1.		M Farrell 0-3, O McDonnell 0-2, D Reilly 0-1.

5 November 2006 First round	Tyrrellspass	1-10 - 1-06	Abbeylara	Cusack Park
	K Connell 0-5, David Glennon 1-1, Denis Glennon 0-2, T Newman and A Corcoran 0-1 each.	Report	P Berry 0-5, N Sheridan 1-0, J Kiernan 0-1.

=== Quarter-finals ===
5 November 2006 Quarter-final	Moorefield	0-10 - 1-07	Horeswood	St Conleth's Park
	R Galvin 0-3, M Treacy 0-3, R Sweeney 0-2, P Murray 0-1, D Whyte 0-1.		J Wall 1-0, L O'Brien 0-3, C Deeley 0-3, Darren O'Reilly 0-1.

5 November 2006 Quarter-final	Palatine	2-07 - 1-11	Rhode	Dr Cullen Park
	P Reid 1-1 (1-0 pen), B Kelly 1-1, J Reid 0-2, N Reid, B Farrell, James Reid 0-1 each.	Report	N McNamee 1-4 (1-0 pen, 0-2f), P Kelleghan 0-3, G Hickey 0-2, S Sullivan, R Malone 0-1 each.

12 November 2006 Quarter-final replay	Horeswood	1-05 - 3-08	Moorefield	Wexford Park
	L O'Brien 1-3 (3fs, 1-0 pen); PJ Banville, D Shannon 0-1.	Report	P Woulfe 2-1; R Sweeney 0-3 (fs), J Phillips 1-0; P Behan 0-2; P Murray (f), M Tracey 0-1 each.

12 November 2006 Quarter-final	Wolfe Tones	0-11 - 1-11	University College Dublin	Páirc Tailteann
	C Ward 0-7 (6f); S Sheppard, S Corrigan, G Beggy, D O'Neill 0-1;	Report	S Lennon 1-4 (2f); C Judge 0-3; C O'Dywer 0-2; B Sheehan, C Rodgers 0-1.

12 November 2006 Quarter-final	Tyrrellspass	1-07 - 0-10	Arles/Killeen	Cusack Park
	J Enright 0-9 (7f); B O'Loughlin 0-1.	Report	Denis Glennon 0-3 (2f); TJ Gonoud 1-0; S Arthur, K Connell, J Corcoran, David Glennon 0-1 each.

18 November 2006 Quarter-final replay	Arles/Killeen	0-05 - 0-07	Tyrrellspass	O'Moore Park
	J Enright 0-5 (3f).	Report	David Glennon 0-3 (3f); J Corcoran, M Flanagan, R Sheeran, Denis Glennon 0-1 each.

=== Semi-finals ===
19 November 2006 Semi-final	University College Dublin	1-08 - 2-06	Rhode	Parnell Park
	A O'Malley 0-4 (2f); C O'Dwyer 1-0; S Lennon 0-2 (1 '45); B Sheehan, C Rogers 0-1 each.	Report	N McNamee 1-3 (1-0 pen, 1f, 1 '45); A McNamee 1-0; R Malone 0-2; E Byrne 0-1.

26 November 2006 Semi-final	Tyrrellspass	0-07 - 0-08	Moorefield	Cusack Park
	K Connell 0-2, David Glennon 0-2, M Flanagan 0-1, Denis Glennon 0-1, P Sheridan 0-1.		P Murray 0-3, A Melia 0-1, R Sweeney 0-1, P Woulfe 0-1, F Hanniffy 0-1, R Delaney 0-1.

=== Final ===
3 December 2006 Final	Moorefield	3-06 - 0-08	Rhode	St Conleth's Park
	R Sweeney 2-3 (2 pens,1f) D Whyte 1-0, P Murray 0-2 (1'45), J Philips 0-1.	Report	N McNamee 0-5 (2f), R Malone 0-2, P O'Sullivan 0-1.	Referee: Maurice Deegan (Laois)

== Munster ==
=== Quarter-finals ===
12 November 2006 Quarter-final	Nemo Rangers	1-09 - 0-03	Éire Óg, Ennis	Páirc Uí Chaoimh
	J Masters 1-1, M Cronin 0-2, D Kavanagh 0-1, D Mehigan 0-1, A Cronin 0-1, P Kerrigan 0-1, A Moran 0-1, M Daly 0-1.		S Hickey 0-2, S Daniels 0-1.

12 November 2006 Quarter-final	Fr. Casey's	0-06 - 1-07	Aherlow	Fr Casey GAA Grounds
	M Scannell 0-3, J Linehan 0-1, R Browne 0-1, D O'Connor 0-1.		B Grogan 1-5, S Moloney 0-2.

=== Semi-finals ===
26 November 2006 Semi-final	Nemo Rangers	0-10 - 2-10	Dr. Crokes	Páirc Uí Chaoimh
	D Niblock 0-1, J Masters 0-6 (4f), P Kerrigan 0-2, S O'Brien, D Niblock 0-1 each.	Report	C Cooper 1-4, B Looney 1-0, K O'Leary 0-2, A O'Donovan, K Brosnan, A Kennelly, E Brosnan 0-1 each.

26 November 2006 Semi-final	Aherlow	1-06 - 1-06	The Nire	Leahy Park
	M O'Shea 1-0, B Grogan 0-2, S Moloney 0-2, D Peter 0-1, J Hennessy 0-1.		C Power 1-1, D Wall 0-2, M Walsh 0-1, B Wall 0-1, P Walsh 0-1.

3 December 2006 Semi-final replay	The Nire	1-10 - 0-06	Aherlow	Fraher Field
	C Power 0-4, M Walsh 1-0, D Wall 0-3, S Walsh 0-3.		B Grogan 0-4, S Grogan 0-2.

=== Final ===
10 December 2006 Final	Dr. Crokes	2-05 - 0-08	The Nire	Páirc Uí Chaoimh
	C Cooper 2-1 (0-1f), K O'Leary 0-2, E Kavanagh, A Kennelly 0-1 each.	Report	B Wall 0-3 (0-1f), S Walsh 0-2, M O'Gorman, P Walsh, L Lawlor 0-1 each.	Referee: J Geaney (Cork)

== Ulster ==
=== Preliminary round ===
29 October 2006 Preliminary round	Gaoth Dobhair	1-04 - 0-12	Crossmaglen Rangers	MacCumhaill Park
	J Duffy 1-1; N McGee, S Cassidy, G Whoriskey (f) 0-1 each.	Report	O McConville 0-5 (3f); M Aherne, M McNamee 0-3 each; J Hanratty 0-1.

=== Quarter-finals ===
12 November 2006 Quarter-final	Ballinderry	0-15 - 0-01	Mayobridge	Watty Graham Park
	C Gilligan 0-4 (2f, 1 '45'), R Wilkinson 0-3, G Cassidy 0-2, D Conway 0-2, E Muldoon, D Crozier, M McIver, M Harney 0-1.	Report	M Walsh 0-1 (f)

12 November 2006 Quarter-final	Errigal Ciarán	0-07 - 0-06	Enniskillen Gaels	Healy Park
	P Canavan 0-4 (3f), C Tierney 0-3.	Report	M Keenan 0-3 (3 f), R Judge 0-3 (2f).

12 November 2006 Quarter-final	Erin's Own	0-12 - 1-09	Clontibret	Casement Park
	C Close 0-6 (3f), M McCann 0-3 (2f), T McCann 0-2 (1f, 1 '45'), J Crozier 0-1.	Report	N Morgan 0-6 (5f), M Hughes 1-0, V Corey 0-2, JP Mone 0-1.

12 November 2006 Quarter-final	Crossmaglen Rangers	2-13 - 1-07	Mullahoran	Oliver Plunkett Park
	O McConville 2-4 (2f), S Kernan 0-3, J McEntee 0-2, B McKeown, T Kernan, M McNamee (f), S Clarke all 0-1 each.	Report	E Reilly 0-4 (3f), D Brady 0-3 (2f), C M Reilly 1-0.	Referee: M Sludden (Tyrone)

19 November 2006 Quarter-final replay	Clontibret	3-08 - 0-10	Erin's Own	St Tiernach's Park
	N Morgan 1-4, V Corey 1-1, R Gorman 1-0, JP Mone 0-1, P McGuigan 0-1, C McManus 0-1.		K Close 0-6, M McCann 0-2, S Devlin 0-2.

=== Semi-finals ===
19 November 2006 Semi-final	Ballinderry	0-10 - 0-10	Errigal Ciarán	Casement Park
	C Gilligan 0-5f; J Conway, J Bateson, R Wilkinson, D Conway, E Muldoon all 0-1 each.	Report	E Gormley 0-4; Peter Canavan (2f), D McDermott 0-2 each; Enda McGinley, C Tierney 0-1 each.

26 November 2006 Semi-final	Crossmaglen Rangers	1-09 - 0-11	Clontibret	Kingspan Breffni Park
	O McConville 0-4; J Hanratty 1-0; J McNamee, M McNamee 0-2 each; J Murtagh 0-1.	Report	C McManus 0-3; F Mone 0-2; P Duffy, R Gorman, D Mone, P McGuigan, M Hughes, V Corey 0-1 each.	Referee: C Reynolds (Down)

26 November 2006 Semi-final replay	Ballinderry	1-15 - 3-07	Errigal Ciarán	Casement Park
	C Gilligan 0-8 (4f), D Conway 1-3, J Conway 0-3, R Wilkinson 0-1.	Report	Peter Canavan 1-3 (2f), D McDermott 1-1, M Harte 1-0 (pen), R McCrory 0-2, P Loughran 0-1.

=== Final ===
3 December 2006 Final	Crossmaglen Rangers	0-05 - 0-03	Ballinderry	Casement Park
	O McOnville 0-2 (2f), D McKenna, B McKeown, J Murtagh 0-1 each.	Report	C Gilligan 0-2 (1f), E Muldoon 0-1 (1f).	Referee: Joe McQuillan (Cavan)

== Quarter-final ==
28 January 2007 Quarter-final	St Brendan's	0-05 - 2-12	Dr Crokes	Emerald GAA Grounds
	K Pahir 0-4 (frees); A Brett 0-1 free).	Report	C Cooper 2-6 (2-0 pens., 0-4 f); K O’Leary, E Brosnan, J Fleming, K Brosnan, B Moloney, B Moriarty 0-1 each.	Referee: T Quigley (Dublin)

== Semi-finals ==
18 February 2007 Semi-final	Dr Crokes	1-09 - 0-12	Moorefield	Gaelic Grounds
	C Cooper (1-4, 3 frees), J Fleming (0-2, 1 free), B McMahon, B Looney, K O’Leary (0-1 each).	Report	P Murray (0-5, 3 frees), J Philips (0-2), G Naughton, R Glavin, D Flynn, F Hanniffy, P Wolfe (0-1 each).	Referee: B Tyrrell (Tipperary)

18 February 2007 Semi-final	St Brigid's	0-11 - 1-11	Crossmaglen Rangers	Cusack Park
	F Dolan (0-7, 5f), K Mannion (0-1); J Tiernan (0-1), David O’Connor (0-1f), D Blaine (0-1).	Report	O McConville (0-5, 3f), M McNamee (1-1), J Hanratty (0-2), J Murtagh (0-2), D McKenna (0-1).	Referee: E Murtagh (Longford)

25 February 2007 Semi-final replay	Dr Crokes	2-09 - 0-08	Moorefield	MacDonagh Park
	D Moloney 1-2 (0-1 45); C Cooper {0-2 frees}, K O’Leary 0-3 each; E Brosnan 1-0; A O’Donovan 0-1.	Report	P Murray 0-2, D Flynn, P Wolfe, M Tracey, R Sweeney (free), J Philips, R Glavin 0-1 each.	Referee: Maurice Deegan (Laois)

== Final ==
17 March 2007 Final	Crossmaglen Rangers	1-09 – 1–09	Dr Crokes	Croke Park
	O McConville 1-2 (1f), A Kernan (2f), D McNamee, M McKenna 0-2 each, J McEntee 0-1.	Report	S Doolan 1-1, B Looney, C Cooper (2f) 0-2 each, A O'Donovan, J Fleming, D Moloney, K O'Leary 0-1 each.	Referee: S Doyle (Wexford)

1 April 2007 Final replay	Crossmaglen Rangers	0-13 – 1–05	Dr Crokes	O'Moore Park
	O McConville 0-6 (4f), A Kernan 0-3 (2f), S Kernan 0-2, M Aherne, J Murtagh 0-1 each.	Report	C Cooper 0-3 (2f), D Moloney 1-0, K O'Leary 0-2.	Referee: E Murtagh (Longford)

== Statistics ==
=== Top scorers ===
Overall

Rank	Player	Club	Tally	Total	Matches	Average
1	Colm Cooper	Dr Crokes	6-23	41	7	5.85
2	Oisín McConville	Crossmaglen Rangers	3-28	37	7	
3	Conleith Gilligan	Ballinderry	0-19	19	4	4.75
3	Patrick Murray	Moorefield	0-19	19	7	2.71
4	Niall McNamee	Rhode	2-12	18	3	6.00
5	Ronan Sweeney	Moorefield	2-11	17	7	2.42
6	Frankie Dolan	St Brigid's	0-16	16	4	4.00
7	Barry Grogan	Aherlow	1-11	14	3	4.66
7	Jason Enright	Arles/Killeen	0-14	14	2	7.00
8	Noel Morgan	Clontibret	1-10	13	3	4.33

In a single game

Rank	Player	Club	Tally	Total	Opposition
1	Colm Cooper	Dr. Crokes	2-06	12	St Brendan's
2	Oisín McConville	Crossmaglen Rangers	2-04	10	Mullahoran
3	Ronan Sweeney	Moorefield	2-03	9	Rhode
3	Jason Enright	Tyrrellspass	0-09	9	Arles/Killeen
4	Barry Grogan	Aherlow	1-05	8	Fr. Casey's
4	Conleith Gilligan	Ballinderry	0-08	8	Errigal Ciarán
5	Philly Woulfe	Moorefield	2-01	7	Horeswood
5	Colm Cooper	Dr Crokes	2-01	7	The Nire
5	Niall McNamee	Rhode	1-04	7	Palatine
5	Shane Lennon	UCD	1-04	7	Wolfe Tones
5	Colm Cooper	Dr. Crokes	1-04	7	Nemo Rangers
5	Noel Morgan	Clontibret	1-04	7	Erin's Own
5	Colm Cooper	Dr Crokes	1-04	7	Moorefield
5	Cian Ward	Wolfe Tones	0-07	7	UCD
5	Frankie Dolan	St Brigid's	0-07	7	Crossmaglen Rangers

=== Miscellaneous ===
- Moorefield won the Leinster Club Championship for the first time in their history.
- St Brigid's won the Connacht Club Championship title for the first time in their history.
