= Karol Mannion =

Roscommon Gaelic footballer

Personal information
- Born: County Roscommon
- Height: 6 ft 3 in (191 cm)

Sport
- Sport: Gaelic football
- Position: Midfield
Club
- Years: Club
- 1990's-: St Brigid's
Club titles
- Roscommon titles: 9
- Connacht titles: 4
- All-Ireland Titles: 1
Inter-county
- Years: County
- 2002-2014: Roscommon
Inter-county titles
- Connacht titles: 1
- NFL: 0

Karol Mannion is a Gaelic footballer who plays for the St Brigid's club and the Roscommon county team.

He first came to prominence with the Roscommon junior team that won Connacht and All-Ireland titles in 2000. He was also part of the Roscommon team that won the Connacht Senior Football Championship in 2010.

He plays his club football with St Brigid's with whom he has had much success winning Roscommon Senior Football Championship medals in 2005, 2006, 2007, 2010, 2011, 2012, 2013, 2014 and 2016. He also has won Connacht Senior Club Football Championships in 2006, 2010, 2011 and 2012. He also played in the 2011 All-Ireland Senior Club Football Championship final but lost out to Crossmaglen Rangers. St. Brigids were back in the final again in 2013 and won by one point to become the first team from Roscommon to win an All-Ireland club title. He also picked up the Man of the Match award.

He announced his retirement from inter-county football in January 2014.

== Honours ==
Inter-county

- 1 Connacht Senior Football Championship (2010)
- 1 All-Ireland Junior Football Championship (2000)
- 1 Connacht Junior Football Championship (2000)

Club

- 1 All-Ireland Senior Club Football Championship (2013)
- 4 Connacht Senior Club Football Championships (2006 2010 2011, 2012)
- 6 Roscommon Senior Football Championships (2005, 2006, 2007, 2010, 2011, 2012)
