= Shane Curran (footballer) =

Roscommon Gaelic footballer

Personal information
- Born: 8 April 1971 (age 55) Castlerea, County Roscommon, Ireland
- Height: 6 ft 0 in (183 cm)

Sport
- Sport: Gaelic Football
- Position: Goalkeeper
Clubs
- Years: Club
- Castlerea St Kevin's; St Brigid's
Club titles
- Roscommon titles: 3
- Connacht titles: 1
- All-Ireland Titles: 1
Inter-county
- Years: County
- 1991–2005: Roscommon
Inter-county titles
- Connacht titles: 1

Shane Curran (born 8 April 1971) is an Irish sportsperson from Castlerea, County Roscommon. He is the former inter-county Gaelic football goalkeeper for Roscommon, and his club St Brigid's. He played association football as well with Athlone Town FC. Curran was managed the Carlow Senior football team in 2024 and resigned from the role in 2025.

Curran's career spanned four decades, with performances at minor, senior and club levels in 1989, 1990, 2003, 2004 and 2013. He also captained the Roscommon Junior Team to All Ireland success in 2000. He won two Connacht club senior football medals, in 2011 and 2012.

Curran was featured in an episode of TG4's Laochra Gael documentary series in January 2021.

== Sports ==
With Roscommon, he won a Connacht Minor Football Championship medal in 1989. He made his senior championship debut with Roscommon as a forward in 1991, however, he was injured early on in the game. He played in the 1992 Connacht Senior Football Championship but couldn't help his side from a heavy loss to Mayo. He drifted away from intercounty football for the next few seasons after the loss, but played in both the 1994 and 1997 championships.

He returned to the senior set-up in 2001 making his first championship appearance in four years in the Connacht Senior Football Championship opening round game against New York. He was sent off during the game and failed to regain the starting spot as Roscommon won a first Connacht title since 1991.

In 2003, he was made captain of the side by new manager Tommy Carr. While Roscommon lost out to Galway in Connacht, they beat Cork and Leitrim in the qualifiers. After two games needing extra time against Offaly and Kildare, Roscommon qualified for an All-Ireland quarter-final with Kerry. It was Roscommon's first game in Croke Park since 1991, and despite scoring three goals they came up short on a 1-21 to 3-10 scoreline.

Curran was also the goalkeeper with Athlone Town FC in the League of Ireland. He retired from association football in 1997 to devote his sporting time to Gaelic football.

== Business ==
Since retiring from inter-county football, Curran has set up a number of businesses. He was commissioned by the GAA games department to contribute to the development of a kicking tee for use in Gaelic football. His design became the one most goalkeepers went on to use. Curran was "involved in producing the Puntee", for use by goalkeepers in kick-outs, as a means of "reducing goalkeeping injuries".

Curran also co-founded a flood defense company, Global Flood Solutions, in 2009. This company has entered into several contracts internationally.

== Politics ==
Curran stood unsuccessfully in the 2016 general election as a Fianna Fáil candidate in the Roscommon–Galway constituency. He received approximately two thousand first presence votes (4%), and was eliminated on the seventh count.

== Honors ==
=== Gaelic football ===
St Brigid's (club)

- All-Ireland Senior Club Football Championship (1): 2013
- Connacht Senior Club Football Championship (2): 2011, 2012
- Roscommon Senior Football Championship (6): 2005, 2007, 2011, 2012, 2013, 2014.

Roscommon (inter-county)

- Connacht Senior Football Championship (1): 2001
- Connacht Minor Football Championship (1): 1989
- All Ireland Junior Football Championship (1) : 2000 (c)

Individual

- All Star nominee: 2003
- GPA Player of the Month (1): May 2004
- Roscommon Senior Player of the Year (1): 2003
- Captained Roscommon: 2003–2004
- Holds championship record for being the only goalkeeper in GAA history to score 1 goal and 1 point in a championship match and finish top scorer. He received the Irish Independent "May Player of the Month" for the same achievement.

=== Soccer ===
- Athlone Town Player of the Year (1): 1995
- Leinster Senior league Medal (1): 1995
