= Brian Kavanagh (Gaelic footballer) =

Irish Gaelic footballer

Personal information
- Native name: Brían Ó Caomhánach (Irish)
- Born: Longford, Ireland
- Occupation: Primary School Teacher
- Height: 1.88 m (6 ft 2 in)

Sport
- Sport: Gaelic Football
- Position: Full Forward
Clubs
- Years: Club
- 2002-2007 2008-: Ardagh St Patrick's; Kilmacud Crokes
Club titles
- Dublin titles: 2
- Leinster titles: 2
- All-Ireland Titles: 1
Inter-county
- Years: County
- 2005-2018: Longford
Inter-county titles
- NFL: 2

Brian Kavanagh was a Gaelic football player for his native Longford and at club level for Kilmacud Crokes of Dublin.

== Career ==
From Ardagh in Longford, Kavanagh transferred to Kilmacud in 2008. He was on the Kilmacud team that won the Dublin Senior Football Championship in October 2008 at Parnell Park. Kavanagh scored two points in the final against St Oliver Plunketts Eoghan Ruadh. He scored a total of 0-16 (6f) in the 2008 Dublin Championship. Kavanagh went on to win the All-Ireland senior club football championship with Kilmacud.

Kavanagh was named as the 2010 Evening Herald/Dublin Bus Dubs stars footballer of the year and was later named as the Leinster club footballer of the year.

He was part of the Longford team that won the 2003 A & B All-Ireland Vocational Schools Championships. In 2006 he was part of the Longford team that made it to the Leinster Under 21 final but lost out to Laois on the day. In 2011 he helped Longford to win Div 4 of the National Football League. He won a Div 3 National League title in 2012 healping his side to a 2 point win over Wexford in the final.

He won a Railway Cup medal with Leinster in 2006.

== Honours ==
- 2 Dublin Club Senior Football Championships (2008, 2010)
- 2 Leinster Club Senior Football Championships (2008, 2010)
- 1 All-Ireland Club Football Championship (2009)
- 1 National Football League Division 4 (2011)
- 1 National Football League Division 3 (2012)
- 1 All-Ireland Vocational School Football Championship (2003)
- 2 Leinster Vocational School Football Championship (2003, 2004)
- 1 Railway Cup (2006)
