= Senan Kilbride =

Irish Gaelic footballer

Personal information
- Nickname: Kizzle
- Occupation: Teacher
- Height: 6 ft 3 in (191 cm)

Sport
- Sport: Gaelic Football
- Position: Full Forward
Club
- Years: Club
- 2003-: St Brigid's
Club titles
- Roscommon titles: 10
- Connacht titles: 4
- All-Ireland Titles: 1
Inter-county
- Years: County
- 2005-2016: Roscommon
Inter-county titles
- Connacht titles: 1

Senan Kilbride is an Irish Gaelic footballer who played at senior level for the Roscommon county team over a ten-year period, winning NFL Division 2, 3 and 4 titles as well as a Connacht Senior title in 2010.

Kilbride plays for the St Brigid's club, with which he won Roscommon Senior Football Championship medals in 2005, 2006, 2007, 2010, 2011, 2012, 2013, 2014, 2016 and 2017. He also has won Connacht Senior Club Football Championships in 2006, 2010, 2011 and 2012.

He played with Brigid's in the 2011 All-Ireland Senior Club Football Championship final but lost out to Crossmaglen Rangers. The club was back in the final again in 2013, winning by one point to become the first team from Roscommon to win an All-Ireland club title.

Kilbride has four Connacht caps and one inter-provincial title.

Kilbride completed a Primary Teaching Degree in St Patrick's College, Dublin and currently works at Cloonakilla National School in Athlone.
