= Frankie Dolan =

Roscommon Gaelic footballer

Personal information
- Born: County Roscommon, Ireland
- Occupation: Postman
- Height: 5 ft 11 in (180 cm)

Sport
- Sport: Gaelic football
- Position: Corner forward
Club
- Years: Club
- ?: St Brigid's
Club titles
- Roscommon titles: 10
- Connacht titles: 4
- All-Ireland Titles: 1
Inter-county
Years	County	Apps (scores)
2001–2005 2008	Roscommon; Roscommon	36 (6-122); 6 (0-3)
Inter-county titles
- Connacht titles: 1

Frankie Dolan is a former Gaelic footballer who played at senior level for the Roscommon county team. He now manages Gaeilic football teams. As of 2023, he is the manager of Abbeylara in County Longford.

== Playing career ==
He was part of the Roscommon team that won the Connacht Under-21 Football Championship in 1999, Connacht Senior Football Championship in 2001 and Connacht Junior Football Championship in 2000 and 2008 and All-Ireland Junior Football Championship in 2000.

He played his club football with St Brigid's, with whom he won Roscommon Senior Football Championship medals in 1997, 2005, 2006, 2007, 2010, 2011, 2012, 2013, 2014 and 2016. He also played in the 2011 All-Ireland Senior Club Football Championship final but lost out to Crossmaglen Rangers. They were back in the final again in 2013 and won by one point to become the first team from Roscommon to win an All-Ireland club title. He also has won Connacht Senior Club Football Championships in 2006, 2010, 2011 and 2012. He also played with Longford GAA club Ballymahon and helped them to win their first Longford Senior Football Championship in 2002.

Dolan described his relationship with Roscommon/Westmeath as follows: "I was born into the county of Roscommon, so I always classed myself as a Roscommon person. Even though, I went to school in Athlone, I played soccer in Athlone all through my younger years with Dessie, Gary. I socialised in Athlone most of the time. Westmeath would be very close to me at heart. I would have spent more time in Westmeath than I did in Roscommon."
