= Niall McNamee =

Irish footballer (born 1985)

Personal information
- Born: 21 October 1985 (age 41) Tullamore, Ireland
- Height: 1.9 m (6 ft 3 in)

Sport
- Sport: Gaelic football
- Position: Full-forward
Clubs
- Years: Club
- 2002– 2006: Rhode; UCD
Club titles
- Offaly titles: 12
Inter-county
Years	County	Apps (scores)
2003–2022	Offaly	160
Inter-county titles
- NFL: 2

Niall McNamee (born 21 October 1985 in Rhode, County Offaly) is an Irish sportsman. He plays Gaelic football for the Rhode club and the Offaly senior county team. He was one of the sport's top forwards from the mid-2000s onwards.

== Playing career ==
=== Club ===
With Rhode McNamee won Offaly SFC titles in 2004, 2005, 2006, 2008, 2010 2012 2014, 2016 and 2017. In 2016, McNamee won Senior Footballer of the Year. He also won minor and under-21 titles with the club.

With UCD he won a Dublin SFC title in 2006, after the club asked him to become involved.

=== Inter-county ===
McNamee had little success with Offaly, despite a lot of playing time. Apart from the 2006 Leinster SFC semi-final, when he scored 1–7 against Wexford. This meant he could play in the 2006 Leinster SFC final; however, Offaly lost that game to Dublin.

Having first played for Offaly at the age of 17 on 25 May 2003, McNamee played for the hundredth time in the 2021 National Football League when he made a substitute appearance against Tipperary. His league and championship appearances at that time amounted to 148.

As of the conclusion of the 2022 season, McNamee was the joint longest serving inter-county player (alongside Ross Munnelly of Laois).

=== International ===
McNamee was a member of the Irish team for the 2010 International Rules Series.
