= St Brigid's GAA (Roscommon) =

Gaelic football club in Roscommon, Ireland

- CLG Naomh Bríd
- Founded: 1944
- County: Roscommon
- Colours: Green and Red
- Grounds: St Brigid's Sports & Social Centre, Kiltoom
- Coordinates: 53°29′07.69″N 8°01′36.40″W

Playing kits
Standard colours	Second colours

Senior Club Championships
	All Ireland	Connacht champions	Roscommon champions
Football:	1	6	20

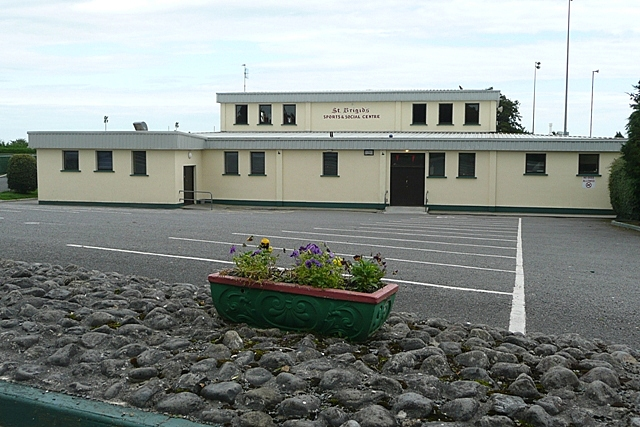
The St Brigid's clubhouse

St Brigid's GAA Club (Naomh Bríd) is a Gaelic football club located in the parishes of Kiltoom and Cam in County Roscommon, Ireland. The club was founded in 1944 and is a member of the Roscommon GAA branch of the Gaelic Athletic Association. As well as senior, intermediate and junior teams, the club fields underage teams from under-8 to under-21 and caters for ladies' Gaelic football at all ages.

St Brigid's' home pitch is at Newpark, Kiltoom. The team plays in green and red colours.

On 25 November 2012, St Brigid's secured a third consecutive Connacht Senior Club Football Championship (SFC) title, defeating Ballaghaderreen by 1–12 to 0–6, and becoming the second club team in Connacht to achieve this. St Brigid's won the 2012–13 All-Ireland Senior Club Football Championship title, defeating Dublin GAA club Ballymun Kickhams in the final at Croke Park on Saint Patrick's Day, 17 March 2013.

== History ==
In 2005, St Brigid's became the first club in Roscommon to win senior, under-21 and minor men's and ladies' titles, all in one year.

The club's under-21 team set a record by achieving eight consecutive county titles between 2002 and 2009.

=== Roscommon SFC ===
The club has won seven Roscommon SFC titles since 1997.

Under the management of John O'Mahony, the club won its first Roscommon SFC title for 28 years in 1997, defeating Clann na Gael in the final by 1–8 to 0–8, the goal coming from John Tiernan. The club had to wait until 2000 before reaching another county final, but this time lost to Kilbride, the underdog. Further defeats came in 2002 (to Strokestown) and in 2003 (to Castlerea St Kevin's). In 2005, under the stewardship of Ger Dowd, the club reclaimed the Fahey Cup, defeating Padraig Pearses by 2–9 to 0–11, with both goals coming from John Tiernan. In 2006, under Anthony Cunningham, the club defended its title by defeating St Faithleach's on a scoreline of 1–7 to 1–5, the goal courtesy of Garvan Dolan. In 2007, St Brigid's won the three-in-a-row, again defeating St Faithleach's in the final by 1–12 to 0–9. A goal ten minutes from time by Brendan "Dixie" O'Brien sealed the win. In 2010, St Brigid's re-emerged after two years to secure a tenth Roscommon SFC title, defeating Elphin by 0–14 to 0–9. 2011 saw St Brigid's repeat this, defeating Elphin in the final by 1–9 to 0–7, the goal coming from Damien Kelleher. 2012 resulted in St Brigid's achieving a second three-in-a-row in eight years, defeating Padraig Pearses in Kiltoom, with Frankie Dolan scoring two goals in the 2–8 to 0–9 victory. Four-in-a-row was achieved in 2013, the club defeating Western Gaels at Dr Hyde Park in early October. October 2014 saw the "drive for five" completed, with St Brigid's defeating St Faithleach's by 3–12 to 0–7.

=== Connacht Club SFC and All-Ireland Club SFC ===
St Brigid's' Connacht Club SFC campaigns had mixed results until 2006, when the club won a first provincial title.

St Brigid's lost to Mayo GAA club Knockmore in Kiltoom in 1997. In 2005 St Brigid's reached the Connacht Club SFC final, by defeating Leitrim GAA club Kiltubrid after a replay in Kiltoom. However, in the final at Pearse Stadium in Galway, St Brigid's lost to Galway GAA club Salthill–Knocknacarra, the eventual All-Ireland Club SFC winner.

Then, in 2006, the club won the Shane McGettigan Cup in dramatic circumstances. In the preliminary round St Brigid's defeated Sligo GAA club Curry by 1–8 to 1–7. David O'Connor scored a goal at the beginning of the game, and Senan Kilbride scored a point five minutes from the end to secure a one-point victory. In the semi-final St Brigid's defeated the favourite (and previous All-Ireland Club SFC winner) Crossmolina Deel Rovers by 0–13 to 1–6 at Dr Hyde Park. The Connacht Club SFC final was also held at the Hyde, with St Brigid's defeating favourite Corofin, helped by a Karol Mannion goal in injury-time. The result was 1–10 to 3–3, allowing captain Mark O'Carroll lifted the Shane McGettigan Cup on behalf of the club.

In the All-Ireland Club SFC semi-final on 18 February 2007, St Brigid's met the Armagh and Ulster Senior Club Football Championship winner, Crossmaglen Rangers, at Cusack Park in Mullingar. Although facing what was the most successful club team of that time in terms of recent titles won, St Brigid's only narrowly lost, by 1–11 to 0–11. For a second consecutive year St Brigid's had been eliminated by the eventual All-Ireland Club SFC winner.

The Connacht Club SFC title defence in 2007 was unsuccessful. St Brigid's had a comprehensive semi-final victory in Tuam over the Pádraic Joyce-inspired Killererin, winning by 4–10 to 1–11. For the final St Brigid's travelled to the home territory of Ballina Stephenites in North Mayo. St Brigid's conceded two early goals to Ballina and never recovered. The end result was Ballina 2–8, St Brigid's 0–12.

In 2010, St Brigid's opened their Connacht Club SFC campaign with a 0–21 to 0–4 win against the Sligo champion, Eastern Harps, in Kiltoom. The club followed that with a 1–13 to 3–5 win in the semi-final over Glencar–Manorhamilton, at Páirc Seán Mac Diarmada in Carrick-on-Shannon. In the final, St Brigid's again met Killererin at Tuam Stadium in a re-match of the 2007 Connacht Club SFC semi-final. A late Cathal McHugh goal meant St Brigid's forced extra-time. In the additional twenty minutes, St Brigid's pulled clear to record a come-from-behind victory on a scoreline of 2–14 to 1–10, which allowed Niall Grehan to again lift the Shane McGettigan Cup.

On 26 February 2011, St Brigid's travelled to the Gaelic Grounds in Limerick, and there defeated the Munster Club SFC winner Nemo Rangers by a scoreline of 0–13 to 1–8, thus qualifying for a first All-Ireland Club SFC final. In that game, played on St Patrick's Day 2011, St Brigid's faced the Ulster Club SFC winner, Crossmaglen Rangers, their semi-final conquerors of 2007. Many supporters travelled to the game at Croke Park, to watch St Brigid's' inability to overturn the result of 2007; Crossmaglen won by 2–11 to 1–11.

The Connacht Club SFC campaign in the last months of 2011 was another successful one for St Brigid's. It resulted in the club's first Connacht two-in-a-row. After defeating Sligo champion Tourlestrane by 0–16 to 0–10 at Marckiewicz Park in the semi-final, St Brigid's then faced Corofin in the final in Kiltoom, in what was a repeat of the 2006 Connacht SFC final. St Brigid's won this one by 0–11 to 0–10.

In February 2012, St Brigid's lost by a scoreline of 1–11 to 1–9 the All-Ireland Club SFC semi-final, played at Pearse Park in Longford, to near neighbour, the Athlone GAA club Garrycastle. The game was played in front of approximately 10,000 people.

Under the management of Kevin McStay, Liam McHale and Benny O'Brien, St Brigid's secured three consecutive Connacht Club SFC titles in 2012, becoming only the second team to achieve this feat. St Brigid's defeated Melvin Gaels by 2–19 to 0–10 in the quarter-final in Kiltoom. St Brigid's then defeated Salthill–Knocknacarra in the semi-final at Pearse Stadium by 0–15 to 0–8, overturning their defeat in the 2005 Connacht Club SFC final at the same venue. St Brigid's then secured a three-in-a-row of Connacht Club SFC titles, and a fourth title in the team's history, at a foggy and bitterly cold McHale Park in Castlebar, with a dominant second-half performance resulting in a 1–12 to 0–6 defeat of Mayo champion Ballaghaderreen.

In the All-Ireland Club SFC semi-final on 16 February 2013, St Brigid's faced an old foe, Crossmaglen Rangers, with that club seeking three consecutive All-Ireland Club SFC titles. This time the result went in favour of St Brigid's, a 2–7 to 1–9 victory, assisted by a late goal from Conor McHugh.

St Brigid's won a first All-Ireland Club SFC title on 17 March 2013 at Croke Park, defeating Ballymun Kinkhams by 2–11 to 2–10, aided by a last-minute point from Frankie Dolan.

In October 2013, St Brigid's retained the Roscommon SFC title, with a 1–13 to 0–9 defeat of Western Gaels in the final.

St Brigid's' attempt to achieve four consecutive Connacht Club SFC titles was unsuccessful. Defeats of Tourlestrane (Sligo) and St Mary's (Leitrim) led to the club meeting Castlebar Mitchels (Mayo) in the final at Hyde Park; however, St Brigid's lost after extra time, by 3–13 to 2–12.

=== Feile na nGael ===
The club was represented at the All-Ireland Féile na nGael championships by their under-14 boys' team in 2010 and 2011. In 2010, the team travelled to Derry, where they were eliminated at the group stage. Then, in 2011, the team travelled to Youghal in County Cork, reaching the semi-final before losing to a stronger Ahan Gaels team.

== Managerial history ==
St Brigid's Senior Football Manager
Dates	Name	Origin	County titles	Provincial titles	National titles
c. 1969	Gerry O'Malley	St Brigid's	1969	—N/a	—N/a
c. 1997	John O'Mahony		1997	—N/a	—N/a
c. 2005	Ger O'Dowd		2005	—N/a	—N/a
2006–200?	Anthony Cunningham		2006	2006	—N/a
2009/10–2012	Noel O'Brien		2010, 2011	2010, 2011	—N/a
2012–201?	Kevin McStay		2012	2012	2013
2016–2018	Frankie Dolan & Eddie Lohan	St Brigid's & Kilbride	2016, 2017	—N/a	—N/a
2021/2–2024	Jerome Stack		2023	2023	—N/a
2024–	Anthony Cunningham		2025	2025	—N/a

== Notable players ==
- Shane Curran
- Frankie Dolan
- Ruaidhrí Fallon
- Senan Kilbride
- Karol Mannion
- Ben O'Carroll
- Gerry O'Malley
- Brian Stack

== Roscommon All-Ireland medalists ==
- 1939 All-Ireland Minor Football Championship: Paddy Donnelly, Larry Cummins
- 1951 All-Ireland Minor Football Championship: John O'Brien, Frank McKevitt
- 1966 All-Ireland Under-21 Football Championship: Gerry Mannion, Jim Keane
- 2000 All-Ireland Junior Football Championship: Shane Curran, Michael O'Brien, Basil Mannion, Brendan "Dixie" O'Brien, Karol Mannion
- 2006 All-Ireland Minor Football Championship: Peter Domican, Cathal McHugh, Robbie Gilligan

== Honours ==
- Roscommon Senior Football Championship: 20
  - 1953, 1958, 1959, 1963, 1969, 1997, 2005, 2006, 2007, 2010, 2011, 2012, 2013, 2014, 2016, 2017, 2020, 2023, 2025, 2026
- Connacht Senior Club Football Championship: 6
  - 2006, 2010, 2011, 2012, 2023, 2025
- All-Ireland Senior Club Football Championship: 1
  - 2013
