= 1970–71 All-Ireland Senior Club Football Championship =

Irish Football Championship

- Dates: 13 September 1970 – 21 November 1971
- Teams: 31
- Champions: East Kerry (1st title); Mick Gleeson (captain)
- Runners-up: Bryansford

Tournament statistics
- Matches played: 32

Provincial Champions
- Munster: East Kerry
- Leinster: Gracefield
- Ulster: Bryansford
- Connacht: Fr Griffins

The 1970–71 All-Ireland Senior Club Football Championship was the inaugural staging of the All-Ireland Senior Club Football Championship since its establishment by the Gaelic Athletic Association. The competition began on 13 September 1970 and ended on 21 November 1971.

East Kerry defeated Bryansford by 5–9 to 2–7 in the final at Croke Park on 21 November 1971 to win the competition. It remains the team's only title.

== Connacht ==
=== First round ===
8 November 1970 First round	Gortletteragh	1-04 - 1-07	St Patrick's	Páirc Gortleitreach, Annaghmore

=== Semi-finals ===
22 November 1970 Semi-final	Clann na nGael	1-02 - 2-11	Fr Griffin's	Kiltoom

7 February 1971 Semi-final	St Patrick's	0-07 - 1-17	Castlebar Mitchels	Kilcoyne Park, Tubbercurry

=== Final ===
28 February 1971 Final	Fr Griffin's	2-09 - 1-10	Castlebar Mitchels	Pearse Stadium, Galway

== Leinster ==
=== First round ===
10 April 1971 First round	Eadestown	1-04 - 2-11	St Vincent's	St Conleth's Park, Newbridge

11 April 1971 First round	Portlaoise	1-10 - 2-08	Gracefield	O'Moore Park, Portlaoise

11 April 1971 First round	Railyard	1-05 - 0-06	Kildavin	Nowlan Park, Kilkenny

11 April 1971 First round	Newtown Blues	1-10 - 1-08	St Mary's	Pearse Park, Longford

11 April 1971 First round	The Downs	0-08 - 0-07	Kilbride	Cusack Park, Mullingar

=== Second round ===
12 May 1971 Second round	St Vincent's	2-11 - 1-15	Castletown	Parnell Park, Dublin

12 May 1971 Second round	Newtown Blues	4-09 - 0-10	The Downs	Athletic Grounds, Drogheda

- Railyard and Gracefield each received a bye in this round.

=== Semi-finals ===
12 May 1971 Semi-final	Gracefield	1-08 - 0-06	Railyard	Mill Field, Portarlington

2 June 1971 Semi-final	Newtown Blues	2-09 - 4-03	Castletown	Parnell Park, Dublin

2 June 1971 Semi-final replay	Newtown Blues	1-11 - 1-06	Castletown	Croke Park, Dublin

=== Final ===
25 July 1971 Final	Gracefield	0-12 - 0-09	Newtown Blues	Croke Park, Dublin

== Munster ==
=== First round ===
24 January 1971 First round	East Kerry	1-06 - 2-01	Ardfinnan	FitzGerald Stadium, Killarney
	M Gleeson 1-1, J Culloty 0-2, P O'Donoghue 0-2, J Mahony 0-1.		P Savage 1-0, M Keating 1-0, T Ryan 0-1.

24 January 1971 First round	Shannon Gaels	1-04 - 0-07	Claughaun	Lahinch
	M Moloney 1-3, B Hanrahan 0-1.		M Tynan 0-4, E Cregan 0-2, M Graham 0-1.

21 February 1971 First round replay	Claughaun	2-08 - 0-08	Shannon Gaels	Gaelic Grounds, Limerick
	M Tynan 1-3, C Keating 1-1, E Cregan 0-1, C Cregan 0-1, O Keating 0-1, M Graham 0-1.		B Hanrahan 0-7, F Dillon 0-1.

=== Semi-finals ===
7 February 1971 Semi-final	John Mitchels	2-06 - 4-15	East Kerry	Páirc de Hindenburg, Portlaw
	O O'Connor 2-1, T Power 0-3, T Gough 0-2.		E Fitzgerald 1-4, M Lyne 1-2, M Gleeson 1-2, J Culloty 0-5, P Moynihan 1-0, G Cullinane 0-1, S Mahony 0-1.

27 February 1971 Semi-final	Muskerry	2-08 - 0-08	Claughaun	Castle Grounds, Macroom
	M Dunne 1-5, M Mehigan 1-0, J Lynch 0-1, F Cooper 0-1.		M Tynan 0-6, C Keating 0-1, P Dwyer 0-1.

=== Final ===
17 March 1971 Final	East Kerry	0-07 - 0-06	Muskerry	FitzGerald Stadium, Killarney
	J Mahony 0-3, D O'Sullivan 0-2, M Gleeson 0-1, P O'Donoghue 0-1.		S McCarthy 0-3, J Curtin 0-1, M Mehigan 0-1, C Kelly 0-1.

== Ulster ==
=== Preliminary round ===
25 October 1970 Preliminary round	St Joseph's	1-06 - 0-10	Newbridge	Bundoran

=== Quarter-finals ===
13 September 1970 Quarter-final	Castleblayney Faughs	1-09 - 1-09	Crossmaglen Rangers	St Mary's Park, Castleblayney

25 October 1970 Quarter-final	Crosserlough	1-06 - 1-09	Tempo Maguires	Breffni Park, Cavan

8 November 1970 Quarter-final replay	Crossmaglen Rangers	1-07 - 1-05	Castleblayney Faughs	St Oliver Plunkett Park, Crossmaglen

22 November 1970 Quarter-final	Newbridge	1-07 - 0-07	Eglish	DEan McGlinchey Park, Ballinascreen

13 December 1970 Quarter-final	Bryansford	2-13 - 2-11	St John's	St Patrick's Park, Newcastle

=== Semi-finals ===
13 December 1970 Semi-final	Newbridge	1-08 - 0-09	Tempo Maguires	O'Neill Park, Dungannon

20 December 1970 Semi-final	Bryansford	0-08 - 0-05	Crossmaglen Rangers	Páirc Esler, Newry

=== Final ===
24 December 1970 Final	Bryansford	0-06 - 0-03	Newbridge	Casement Park, Belfast

== Semi-finals ==
30 May 1971 Semi-final	Bryansford	w/o - scr.	Fr Griffin's	St Patrick's Park, Newcastle

5 September 1971 Semi-final	Gracefield	0-07 - 0-12	East Kerry	O'Connor Park, Tullamore
	D Murphy 0-3, M Knight 0-2, M Colgan 0-1, E Kennedy 0-1.		P Moynihan 0-2, M Gleeson 0-2, D O'Sullivan 0-2, P O'Donoghue 0-2, D Coffey 0-2, D O'Keeffe 0-1, E Fitzgerald 0-1.

== Final ==
21 November 1971 Final	East Kerry	5-09 - 2-07	Bryansford	Croke Park, Dublin
	M Gleeson 2-1, D Kavanagh 2-0, D Coffey 1-3, D O'Keeffe 0-3, D Healy 0-2.		W Kane 0-5, B Neeson 1-0, B Ward 1-0, F Grant 0-1, P Neeson 0-1.	Referee: Jimmy Hatton (Wicklow)

== Statistics ==
=== Miscellaneous ===
- Bryansford became the first team to win back-to-back Ulster Club SFC titles.
- East Kerry became the first team to win three Munster Club SFC title.
