= All-Ireland Senior Club Football Championship =

Annual Gaelic football tournament

- Current season or competition: 2026–27 All-Ireland Senior Club Football Championship
- Irish: Craobh Shinsearaí Peile Chlub na hÉireann
- Founded: 1970–71
- Region: Ireland (GAA)
- Trophy: Andy Merrigan Cup
- No. of teams: 4
- Title holders: Dingle (1st title)
- Most titles: Nemo Rangers (7 titles)
- Sponsors: AIB
- TV partner(s): TG4, RTÉ2
- Motto: #TheToughest
- Official website: www.gaa.ie/football/gaa-football-all-ireland-senior-club/

The All-Ireland Senior Club Football Championship (abbreviated as the All-Ireland Club SFC) is an annual Gaelic football tournament which began in season 1970–71. It is the top-tier competition for the senior football clubs of Ireland and London.

The current champions are Dingle of Kerry who defeated St Brigid's of Roscommon on 18 January 2026 to win their first All-Ireland Senior Club Football Championship.

The current trophy is the Andy Merrigan Cup, named after a footballer who played for Castletown Liam Mellows and Wexford who died as a result of a farm accident at the height of his playing career. It was first presented in 1974.

== Competition format ==
=== County championships ===
Ireland's 32 counties play their county championships between their senior Gaelic football clubs. Each county decides the format for determining their county champions. The format can be knockout, double-elimination, league, etc. or a combination. For instance, Kerry organise two separate championships - one for clubs only and one for clubs and divisional sides.

=== Provincial championships ===
Connacht, Leinster, Munster and Ulster each organise a provincial championship for their participating county champions. All matches are knock-out and two ten minute periods of extra time are played if it's a draw at the end of normal time.

=== All-Ireland championship ===
The four provincial winners advance to the semi-finals. Until the 2018-19 competition, the London Senior Football Champion would play one of the provincial champions in a Quarter Final in December, with the winner advancing to the All Ireland Semi Final. The All-Ireland final was traditionally played in Croke Park on St. Patrick's Day, 17 March.

In an attempt to shorten the season for club players, the semi-finals and final were brought forward for the 2019–20 season. The semi-finals were played on the first weekend in January, with the final scheduled for 19 January.

== History ==
Ulster and Connacht tournaments were first held in the 1960s, and the first unofficial All-Ireland Final took place in 1968. The final was contested by Dunmore McHales of Galway and St Josephs of Donegal. It was a two-leg affair with St Josephs emerging as the winners. The motion was then brought to the GAA National Congress in 1969. Despite opposition from many delegations, the motion received the necessary two-thirds majority.

The first winners in 1970–71 were an East Kerry divisional team (nowadays, amalgamations of clubs are not allowed to enter the All-Ireland). In the following year, Bellaghy from Derry, became the first individual club to win the All-Ireland Club Championship by defeating UCC of Cork in the final at Croke Park.

The Andy Merrigan Cup was first awarded in 1974, donated by the Castletown Liam Mellows club in memory of the great Wexford footballer who died in a farming accident at the height of his career.

Dublin clubs (UCD x2 and St Vincent's of Marino) won three-in-a-row All-Irelands in 1974–76, before Kerry and Cork clubs began to dominate, winning 9 titles in 13 years, 1977–89, including four for Nemo Rangers of Cork. Clann na nGael won 7 Connacht titles in 8 years (1983–90), but did not win a single All-Ireland.

St Mary's Burren of Down ended a 14-year Ulster drought when they were victorious in 1986. Baltinglass caused a major shock in 1990 by winning their and Wicklow's first national honour, while Nemo pulled ahead with their fifth title in 1994. In 1998, Corofin won Galway's and Connacht's first national award, six months before the county team's first All-Ireland for 32 years.

In the late 1990s, the club championship rose to national prominence with regular TV coverage and the prestigious St Patrick's Day fixture in Croke Park for the final. Crossmaglen Rangers claimed 3 All-Irelands in 4 years from 1997 to 2000. While the Caltra club of Galway won their first Galway title, first Connacht award and first All-Ireland in one year, 2003–04. 2006 saw Salthill-Knocknacarra of Galway complete a Connacht three-in-a-row.

In 2010, St Gall's in Antrim beat Kilmurry-Ibrickane of Clare to win their first title.

In 2023, Kilmacud Crokes defeated Glen by 1-11 to 1-09 to win their third title. However, Kilmacud Crokes finished the game with an extra player on the pitch, causing significant controversy. The GAA ordered a replay of the final after Glen lodged an objection. However, after Kilmacud Crokes lodged an appeal against a replay, Glen withdrew from the appeals process, saying that they "do not believe the conditions exist for a replay", resulting in Kilmacud retaining their title.

== List of finals ==
Year	Winners			Runners-up			Referee
Year	County	Club	Score	County	Club	Score	Referee
2025–26	KER	Dingle	0-23 (AET)	ROS	St Brigid's	1-19 (AET)	Martin McNally (Monaghan)
2024–25	DUB	Cuala	3-14	TYR	Errigal Ciarán	1-16	Paddy Neilan (Roscommon)
2023–24	DER	Glen	2-10	ROS	St Brigid's	1-12	Brendan Cawley (Kildare)
2022–23	DUB	Kilmacud Crokes	1-11	DER	Glen	1-09	Derek O'Mahoney (Tipperary)
2021–22	DOW	Kilcoo	2-08 (AET)	DUB	Kilmacud Crokes	0-13 (AET)	Seán Hurson (Tyrone)
2020–21	Cancelled due to the COVID-19 pandemic						
2019–20	GAL	Corofin	1-12 (AET)	DOW	Kilcoo	0-07 (AET)	Conor Lane (Cork)
2018–19	GAL	Corofin	2-16	KER	Dr Crokes	0-10	Barry Cassidy (Derry)
2017–18	GAL	Corofin	2-19	COR	Nemo Rangers	0-10	David Gough (Meath)
2016–17	KER	Dr Crokes	1-09	DER	Slaughtneil	1-07	Maurice Deegan (Laois)
2015–16	DUB	Ballyboden St Enda's	2-14	MAY	Castlebar Mitchels	0-07	Conor Lane (Cork)
2014–15	GAL	Corofin	1-14	DER	Slaughtneil	0-07	David Coldrick (Meath)
2013–14	DUB	St Vincents	4-12	MAY	Castlebar Mitchels	2-11	Eddie Kinsella (Laois)
2012–13	ROS	St Brigid's	2-11	DUB	Ballymun Kickhams	2-10	Pádraig Hughes (Armagh)
2011–12	ARM	Crossmaglen Rangers	0-15, 2-19 (R)	WES	Garrycastle	1-12, 1-07 (R)	Rory Hickey (Clare), Marty Duffy (Sligo) (R)
2010–11	ARM	Crossmaglen Rangers	2-11	ROS	St Brigid's	1-11	Cormac Reilly (Meath)
2009–10	ANT	St Gall's	0-13	CLA	Kilmurry-Ibrickane	1-05	Derek Fahy (Longford)
2008–09	DUB	Kilmacud Crokes	1-09	ARM	Crossmaglen Rangers	0-07	Gerry Kinneavy (Galway)
2007–08	DUB	St Vincents	1-11	COR	Nemo Rangers	0-13	Joe McQuillan (Cavan)
2006–07	ARM	Crossmaglen Rangers	1-09, 0-13 (R)	KER	Dr Crokes	1-09, 1-05 (R)	Syl Doyle (Wexford), Eugene Murtagh (Longford) (R)
2005–06	GAL	Salthill-Knocknacarra	0-07	ANT	St Gall's	0-06	David Coldrick (Meath)
2004–05	MAY	Ballina Stephenites	1-12	LAO	Portlaoise	2-08	Brian Crowe (Cavan)
2003–04	GAL	Caltra	0-13	KER	An Ghaeltacht	0-12	Michael Monahan (Kildare)
2002–03	COR	Nemo Rangers	0-14	MAY	Crossmolina Deel Rovers	1-09	Brian Crowe (Cavan)
2001–02	DER	Ballinderry Shamrocks	2-10	COR	Nemo Rangers	0-09	Seamus McCormack (Meath)
2000–01	MAY	Crossmolina Deel Rovers	0-16	COR	Nemo Rangers	1-12	John Bannon (Longford)
1999–2000	ARM	Crossmaglen Rangers	1-14	DUB	Na Fianna	0-12	Mick Curley (Galway)
1998–99	ARM	Crossmaglen Rangers	0-09	MAY	Ballina Stephenites	0-08	John Bannon (Longford)
1997–98	GAL	Corofin	0-15	DUB	Erins Isle	0-10	Pat Casserly (Westmeath)
1996–97	ARM	Crossmaglen Rangers	2-13	MAY	Knockmore	0-11	Brian White (Wexford)
1995–96	KER	Laune Rangers	4-05	CAR	Éire Óg	0-11	Pat McEnaney (Monaghan)
1994–95	DUB	Kilmacud Crokes	0-08	DER	Bellaghy	0-05	Paddy Russell (Tipperary)
1993–94	COR	Nemo Rangers	3-11	MAY	Castlebar Mitchels	0-08	Pat McEnaney (Monaghan)
1992–93	COR	O'Donovan Rossa	1-12, 1-07 (R)	CAR	Éire Óg	3-06, 0-08 (R)	Jim Curran (Tyrone)
1991–92	KER	Dr Crokes	1-11	DUB	Thomas Davis	0-13	Tommy McDermott (Cavan)
1990–91	DER	Lavey	2-09	GAL	Salthill-Knocknacarra	0-10	Tommy Howard (Kildare)
1989–90	WIC	Baltinglass	2-07	ROS	Clann na nGael	0-07	Tommy Sugrue (Kerry)
1988–89	COR	Nemo Rangers	1-13	ROS	Clann na nGael	1-03	Gerry McClory (Antrim)
1987–88	DOW	St Mary's Burren	1-09	ROS	Clann na nGael	0-08	Denis Guerin (Dublin)
1986–87	COR	St Finbarr's	0-10	ROS	Clann na nGael	0-07	Michael Greenan (Cavan)
1985–86	DOW	St Mary's Burren	1-10	KER	Castleisland Desmonds	1-06	
1984–85	KER	Castleisland Desmonds	2-02	DUB	St Vincents	0-07	
1983–84	COR	Nemo Rangers	2-10	MEA	Walterstown	0-05	
1982–83	LAO	Portlaoise	0-12	ROS	Clann na nGael	2-00	
1981–82	COR	Nemo Rangers	6-11	MAY	Garrymore	1-08	
1980–81	COR	St Finbarr's	1-08	MEA	Walterstown	0-06	
1979–80	COR	St Finbarr's	3-09	GAL	St Grellan's	0-08	Weeshie Fogarty (Kerry)
1978–79	COR	Nemo Rangers	2-09	MON	Scotstown	1-03	Tommy Moran (Leitrim)
1977–78	LIM	Thomond College	2-14	ANT	St John's	1-03	Seamus Aldridge (Kildare)
1976–77	KER	Austin Stacks	1-13	DER	Ballerin	2-07	Seamus Aldridge (Kildare)
1975–76	DUB	St Vincents	4-10	ROS	Roscommon Gaels	0-05	Paddy Collins (Westmeath)
1974–75	DUB	UCD	1-11	COR	Nemo Rangers	0-12	P. J. McGrath (Mayo)
1973–74	DUB	UCD	1-06, 0-14 (R)	ARM	Clan na Gael	1-06, 1-04 (R)	Mick Spain (Offaly)
1972–73	COR	Nemo Rangers	2-11, 4-06 (R)	DUB	St Vincents	2-11, 0-10 (R)	
1971–72	DER	Bellaghy	0-15	COR	UCC	1-11	Denis Guerin (Dublin)
1970–71	KER	East Kerry	5-09	DOW	Bryansford	2-07	Jimmy Hatton (Wicklow)

== Summary of All-Ireland champions ==
=== By club ===
#	Club	County	Titles	Runners-up	Years won	Years Runners-Up
1	Nemo Rangers	COR	7	5	1973, 1979, 1982, 1984, 1989, 1994, 2003	1975, 2001, 2002, 2008, 2018
2	Crossmaglen Rangers	ARM	6	1	1997, 1999, 2000, 2007, 2011, 2012	2009
3	Corofin	GAL	5	0	1998, 2015, 2018, 2019, 2020	-
4	St Vincents	DUB	3	2	1976, 2008, 2014	1973, 1985
4	Kilmacud Crokes	DUB	3	1	1995, 2009, 2023	2022
4	St Finbarr's	COR	3	0	1980, 1981, 1987	-
7	Dr Crokes	KER	2	2	1992, 2017	2007, 2019
7	UCD	DUB	2	0	1974, 1975	-
7	St Mary's Burren	DOW	2	0	1986, 1988	-
10	St Brigid's	ROS	1	3	2013	2011, 2024 2026
10	Bellaghy	DER	1	1	1972	1995
10	Portlaoise	LAO	1	1	1983	2005
10	Castleisland Desmonds	KER	1	1	1985	1986
10	Crossmolina Deel Rovers	MAY	1	1	2001	2003
10	Ballina Stephenites	MAY	1	1	2005	1999
10	Salthill-Knocknacarra	GAL	1	1	2006	1991
10	St Gall's	ANT	1	1	2010	2006
10	Kilcoo	DOW	1	1	2022	2020
10	Glen	DER	1	1	2024	2023
10	East Kerry	KER	1	0	1971	-
10	Austin Stacks	KER	1	0	1977	-
10	Thomond College	LIM	1	0	1978	-
10	Baltinglass	WIC	1	0	1990	-
10	Lavey	DER	1	0	1991	-
10	O'Donovan Rossa	COR	1	0	1993	-
10	Laune Rangers	KER	1	0	1996	-
10	Ballinderry Shamrocks	DER	1	0	2002	-
10	Caltra	GAL	1	0	2004	-
10	Ballyboden St Enda's	DUB	1	0	2016	-
10	Cuala	DUB	1	0	2025	-
10	Dingle	KER	1	0	2026	-
30	Clann na nGael	ROS	0	5	-	1983, 1987, 1988, 1989, 1990
30	Castlebar Mitchels	MAY	0	3	-	1994, 2014, 2016
30	Walterstown	MEA	0	2	-	1981, 1984
30	Éire Óg	CAR	0	2	-	1993, 1996
30	Slaughtneil	DER	0	2	-	2015, 2017
30	Bryansford	DOW	0	1	-	1971
30	UCC	COR	0	1	-	1972
30	Clan na Gael	ARM	0	1	-	1974
30	Roscommon Gaels	ROS	0	1	-	1976
30	Ballerin	DER	0	1	-	1977
30	St John's	ANT	0	1	-	1978
30	Scotstown	MON	0	1	-	1979
30	St Grellan's	GAL	0	1	-	1980
30	Garrymore	MAY	0	1	-	1982
30	Thomas Davis	DUB	0	1	-	1992
30	Knockmore	MAY	0	1	-	1997
30	Erins Isle	DUB	0	1	-	1998
30	Na Fianna	DUB	0	1	-	2000
30	An Ghaeltacht	KER	0	1	-	2004
30	Kilmurry-Ibrickane	CLA	0	1	-	2010
30	Garrycastle	WES	0	1	-	2012
30	Ballymun Kickhams	DUB	0	1	-	2013
30	Errigal Ciarán	TYR	0	1	-	2025

=== By county ===
County	Titles	Runners-up	Total
Cork	11	6	17
Dublin	10	7	17
Kerry	7	4	11
Galway	7	2	9
Armagh	6	2	8
Derry	4	5	9
Down	3	2	5
Mayo	2	7	9
Roscommon	1	9	10
Antrim	1	2	3
Laois	1	1	2
Limerick	1	0	1
Wicklow	1	0	1
Carlow	0	2	2
Meath	0	2	2
Clare	0	1	1
Monaghan	0	1	1
Westmeath	0	1	1
Tyrone	0	1	1

L, M, U, C refer to Leinster/Munster/Ulster/Connacht championships won by clubs from the county. "Most recent winning team" gives the name of the club from the county which last won the All-Ireland; if no club has, the name of the last provincial champion is given in italic type.

#	County	All-Irelands	L	M	U	C	Most recent winning team
1	Cork clubs	11		31			Nemo Rangers, 2002–03
2	Dublin clubs	10	27				Cuala, 2024–25
3	Kerry clubs	7		22			Dingle, 2025–26
4	Galway clubs	7				21	Corofin, 2019–20
5	Armagh clubs	6			15		Crossmaglen Rangers, 2011–12
6	Derry clubs	4			17		Watty Graham's, Glen, 2023–24
7	Down clubs	3			9		Kilcoo, 2021–22
8	Mayo clubs	2				16	Ballina Stephenites, 2004–05
9	Roscommon clubs	1				17	St Brigid's, 2012–13
10	Laois clubs	1	7				Portlaoise, 1982–83
11	Antrim clubs	1			4		St Gall's, 2009–10
12	Wicklow clubs	1	2				Baltinglass, 1989–90
12	Limerick clubs	1		2			Thomond College, 1977–78
13	Monaghan clubs	0			7		Castleblayney Faughs, 1991–92
13	Carlow clubs	0	6				O'Hanrahans, 2000
14	Meath clubs	0	4				Dunshaughlin, 2002
14	Offaly clubs	0	4				Ferbane, 1986
14	Sligo clubs	0				4	Coolera/Strandhill, 2024
15		0					
15	Kildare clubs	0	3				Moorefield, 2017
15	Clare clubs	0		3			Kilmurry-Ibrickane, 2009
15	Tyrone clubs	0			3		Errigal Ciarán, 2024
16	Donegal clubs	0			2		Gaoth Dobhair, 2018
17	Longford clubs	0	1				Mullinalaghta St Columba's, 2018
17	Westmeath clubs	0	1				Garrycastle, 2011
17	Tipperary clubs	0		1			Clonmel Commercials, 2015

No club from Cavan, Fermanagh, Kilkenny, Leitrim, London, Louth, Waterford or Wexford has ever won a national or provincial title.

=== By province ===
Province	Titles
Munster	19
Ulster	14
Leinster	12
Connacht	10

== List of provincial champions ==
All-Ireland winners are shaded gold, and counties are given in brackets.

Year	Connacht champions	Leinster champions	Munster champions	Ulster champions
1970–71	Fr. Griffins (Galway)	Gracefield (Offaly)	East Kerry (Kerry)	Bryansford (Down)
1971–72	Claremorris (Mayo)	Portlaoise (Laois)	UCC (Cork)	Bellaghy (Derry)
1972–73	Fr. Griffins (Galway)	St. Vincent's (Dublin)	Nemo Rangers (Cork)	Clan na nGael (Armagh)
1973–74	Knockmore (Mayo)	UCD (Dublin)	UCC (Cork)	Clan na nGael (Armagh)
1974–75	Roscommon Gaels (Roscommon)	UCD (Dublin)	Nemo Rangers (Cork)	Clan na nGael (Armagh)
1975–76	Roscommon Gaels (Roscommon)	St Vincent's (Dublin)	Nemo Rangers (Cork)	St Joseph's (Donegal)
1976–77	Killererin (Galway)	Portlaoise (Laois)	Austin Stacks (Kerry)	Ballerin (Derry)
1977–78	St Mary's (Sligo)	Summerhill (Meath)	Thomond College (Limerick)	St John's (Antrim)
1978–79	Killererin (Galway)	Walsh Island (Offaly)	Nemo Rangers (Cork)	Scotstown (Monaghan)
1979–80	St Grellan's (Galway)	Walsh Island (Offaly)	St Finbarr's (Cork)	Scotstown (Monaghan)
1980–81	St Mary's (Sligo)	Walterstown (Meath)	St Finbarr's (Cork)	Scotstown (Monaghan)
1981–82	Garrymore (Mayo)	Raheens (Kildare)	Nemo Rangers (Cork)	Ballinderry Shamrocks (Derry)
1982–83	Clann na nGael (Roscommon)	Portlaoise (Laois)	St Finbarr's (Cork)	St Gall's (Antrim)
1983–84	St Mary's (Sligo)	Walterstown (Meath)	Nemo Rangers (Cork)	St Mary's Burren (Down)
1984–85	Clann na nGael (Roscommon)	St Vincent's (Dublin)	Castleisland Desmonds (Kerry)	St Mary's Burren (Down)
1985–86	Clann na nGael (Roscommon)	Portlaoise (Laois)	Castleisland Desmonds (Kerry)	St Mary's Burren (Down)
1986–87	Clann na nGael (Roscommon)	Ferbane (Offaly)	St Finbarr's (Cork)	Castleblayney Faughs (Monaghan)
1987–88	Clann na nGael (Roscommon)	Portlaoise (Laois)	Nemo Rangers (Cork)	St Mary's Burren (Down)
1988–89	Clann na nGael (Roscommon)	Parnells (Dublin)	Nemo Rangers (Cork)	St Mary's Burren (Down)
1989–90	Clann na nGael (Roscommon)	Baltinglass (Wicklow)	Castlehaven (Cork)	Scotstown (Monaghan)
1990–91	Salthill-Knocknacarra (Galway)	Thomas Davis (Dublin)	Dr Crokes (Kerry)	Lavey (Derry)
1991–92	Corofin (Galway)	Thomas Davis (Dublin)	Dr Crokes (Kerry)	Castleblayney Faughs (Monaghan)
1992–93	Knockmore (Mayo)	Éire Óg (Carlow)	O'Donovan Rossa (Cork)	Lavey (Derry)
1993–94	Castlebar Mitchels (Mayo)	Éire Óg (Carlow)	Nemo Rangers (Cork)	Errigal Ciarán (Tyrone)
1994–95	Tuam Stars (Galway)	Kilmacud Crokes (Dublin)	Castlehaven (Cork)	Bellaghy (Derry)
1995–96	Corofin (Galway)	Éire Óg (Carlow)	Laune Rangers (Kerry)	Mullaghbawn (Armagh)
1996–97	Knockmore (Mayo)	Éire Óg (Carlow)	Laune Rangers (Kerry)	Crossmaglen Rangers (Armagh)
1997–98	Corofin (Galway)	Erin's Isle (Dublin)	Castlehaven (Cork)	Dungiven (Derry)
1998–99	Ballina Stephenites (Mayo)	Éire Óg (Carlow)	Doonbeg (Clare)	Crossmaglen Rangers (Armagh)
1999–2000	Crossmolina Deel Rovers (Mayo)	Na Fianna (Dublin)	UCC (Cork)	Crossmaglen Rangers (Armagh)
2000–01	Crossmolina Deel Rovers (Mayo)	O'Hanrahans (Carlow)	Nemo Rangers (Cork)	Bellaghy (Derry)
2001–02	Charlestown Sarsfields (Mayo)	Rathnew (Wicklow)	Nemo Rangers (Cork)	Ballinderry Shamrocks (Derry)
2002–03	Crossmolina Deel Rovers (Mayo)	Dunshaughlin (Meath)	Nemo Rangers (Cork)	Errigal Ciarán (Tyrone)
2003–04	Caltra (Galway)	St Brigid's (Dublin)	An Ghaeltacht (Kerry)	An Lúb (Derry)
2004–05	Ballina Stephenites (Mayo)	Portlaoise (Laois)	Kilmurry-Ibrickane (Clare)	Crossmaglen Rangers (Armagh)
2005–06	Salthill-Knocknacarra (Galway)	Kilmacud Crokes (Dublin)	Nemo Rangers (Cork)	St Gall's (Antrim)
2006–07	St Brigid's (Roscommon)	Moorefield (Kildare)	Dr Crokes (Kerry)	Crossmaglen Rangers (Armagh)
2007–08	Ballina Stephenites (Mayo)	St Vincent's (Dublin)	Nemo Rangers (Cork)	Crossmaglen Rangers (Armagh)
2008–09	Corofin (Galway)	Kilmacud Crokes (Dublin)	Dromcollogher-Broadford (Limerick)	Crossmaglen Rangers (Armagh)
2009–10	Corofin (Galway)	Portlaoise (Laois)	Kilmurry-Ibrickane (Clare)	St Gall's (Antrim)
2010–11	St Brigid's (Roscommon)	Kilmacud Crokes (Dublin)	Nemo Rangers (Cork)	Crossmaglen Rangers (Armagh)
2011–12	St Brigid's (Roscommon)	Garrycastle (Westmeath)	Dr Crokes (Kerry)	Crossmaglen Rangers (Armagh)
2012–13	St Brigid's (Roscommon)	Ballymun Kickhams (Dublin)	Dr. Crokes (Kerry)	Crossmaglen Rangers (Armagh)
2013–14	Castlebar Mitchels (Mayo)	St Vincent's (Dublin)	Dr Crokes (Kerry)	Ballinderry Shamrocks (Derry)
2014–15	Corofin (Galway)	St Vincent's (Dublin)	Austin Stacks (Kerry)	Slaughtneil (Derry)
2015–16	Castlebar Mitchels (Mayo)	Ballyboden St Enda's (Dublin)	Clonmel Commercials (Tipperary)	Crossmaglen Rangers (Armagh)
2016–17	Corofin (Galway)	St Vincent's (Dublin)	Dr Crokes (Kerry)	Slaughtneil (Derry)
2017–18	Corofin (Galway)	Moorefield (Kildare)	Nemo Rangers (Cork)	Slaughtneil (Derry)
2018–19	Corofin (Galway)	Mullinalaghta St Columba's (Longford)	Dr Crokes (Kerry)	Gaoth Dobhair (Donegal)
2019–20	Corofin (Galway)	Ballyboden St Enda's (Dublin)	Nemo Rangers (Cork)	Kilcoo (Down)
2020–21	Cancelled due to the COVID-19 pandemic			
2021–22	Pádraig Pearses (Roscommon)	Kilmacud Crokes (Dublin)	St Finbarr's (Cork)	Kilcoo (Down)
2022–23	Moycullen (Galway)	Kilmacud Crokes (Dublin)	Kerins O'Rahilly's (Kerry)	Watty Graham's, Glen (Derry)
2023–24	St Brigid's (Roscommon)	Kilmacud Crokes (Dublin)	Castlehaven (Cork)	Watty Graham's, Glen (Derry)
2024–25	Coolera/Strandhill (Sligo)	Cuala (Dublin)	Dr Crokes (Kerry)	Errigal Ciarán (Tyrone)
2025–26	St Brigid's (Roscommon)	Ballyboden St Enda's (Dublin)	Dingle (Kerry)	Scotstown (Monaghan)
2026–27	Salthill–Knocknacarra or Castlebar Mitchels	4 teams still in competition	4 teams still in competition	4 teams still in competition

== See also ==
- All-Ireland Intermediate Club Football Championship
- All-Ireland Junior Club Football Championship
- All-Ireland Senior Club Hurling Championship
- All-Ireland Senior Football Championship
