= Kiltoom, County Roscommon =

Civil parish in County Roscommon, Ireland

Coordinates: 53.492°N 8.037°W

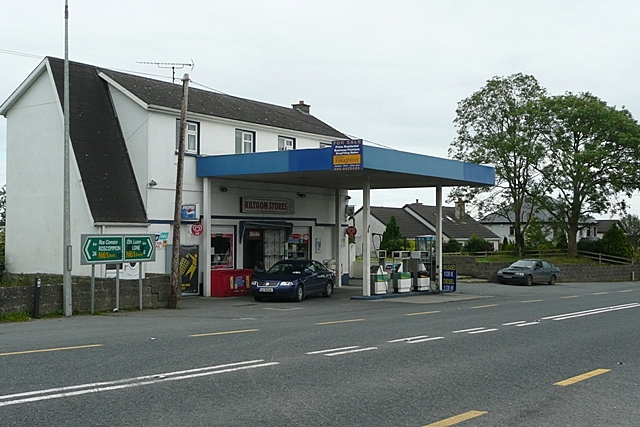
Kiltoom Stores on the N61 road.

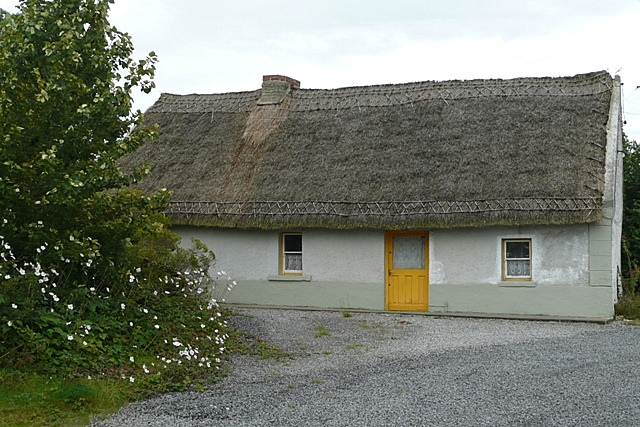
Cottage at Kiltoom.

Kiltoom, also Kiltomb (from Irish Cill Tuama), is a civil parish as well as an electoral division in County Roscommon, Ireland. There is also an eponymous townland in the parish. Kiltoom is located northwest of Athlone on the southwestern shore of Lough Ree.

The main road in the parish area is the N61 between Athlone and Roscommon. Kiltoom formerly had a railway station on the Dublin to Westport line which opened in 1860 and closed in 1963. The primary school, Ballybay Central National School, is a Catholic school. The townlands and parishes of Kiltoom and Cam were used as examples in a study of rural communities in Roscommon in the century preceding the Great Famine of the 1840s.

== History ==
Historic sites include an ancient burial mound on which the first church in the village was built, near which is a holy well known as Tobar Pádraig or Patrick's Well. The Kiltoom rectory was served by Cluniac monks from Athlone in the 15th century. In the late 17th century a secular priest resided at Kiltoom. In the second half of the 18th century the Roman Catholic parishes of Kiltoom and neighbouring Cam were united. The church of Kiltoom is dedicated to the Risen Christ, and the new central window (2014) in the sacristy depicts the resurrection of Jesus. Several stately homes were located in the area of the parish. A hotel has been built at Hodson Bay on Lough Ree, near the site of one of these homes.
