= 2015–16 All-Ireland Intermediate Club Football Championship =

Irish Gaelic football competition

- Dates: 17 October 2015 – 6 February 2016
- Teams: 32
- Sponsor: Allied Irish Bank
- Champions: St Mary's (1st title); Seán Cournane (captain); Maurice Fitzgerald (manager)
- Runners-up: Hollymount Carramore; Darren Coen (captain); Tom Connelly (manager)

Tournament statistics
- Top scorer: Bryan McMahon (1–29)

Provincial Champions
- Munster: St Mary's
- Leinster: Ratoath
- Ulster: Loughinisland
- Connacht: Hollymount Carramore

The 2015–16 All-Ireland Intermediate Club Football Championship was the 13th staging of the All-Ireland Intermediate Club Football Championship since its establishment by the Gaelic Athletic Association for the 2003–04 season. The competition ran fom 17 October 2015 to 6 February 2016.

The All-Ireland final was played on 6 February 2016 at Croke Park in Dublin, between St Mary's and Hollymount Carramore. St Mary's won the match by 2-10 to 0-10 to claim their first ever championship title.

== Connacht Intermediate Club Football Championship ==
=== Connacht quarter-final ===
17 October 2015 Quarter-final	Easkey	0-09 - 3-09	Melvin Gaels	Markievicz Park
	R McKenna 0-5, D Sloyan 0-2, E Healy 0-1, E Lindsay 0-1.		J Connolly 1-5, D Roper 1-0, J McGuinness 1-0, D McSharry 0-1, D Rooney 0-1, P Simpson 0-1, L Ryan 0-1.

=== Connacht semi-finals ===
1 November 2015 Semi-final	Michael Glaveys	2-07 - 2-16	Moycullen	Dr Hyde Park
	A Glennon (1-4, 3 frees), S Comer (1-1), T Murphy (0-1); S Burke (0-1).	Report	S Kelly (1-2), B Faherty (1-0), P Leydon (0-6, 5 frees), D Conneally (0-2), C Bohan (0-2), P Cooke (0-2, frees); D Wyndham (0-1 free); S O’Flaherty (0-1).

1 November 2015 Semi-final	Hollymount–Carramore	2-13 - 1-14 (aet)	Melvin Gaels	Elverys MacHale Park
	D Coen 1-6, K McNamara 1-0, R Molloy 0-2, K Feerick 0-2, I Costello 0-1, C Keane 0-1, C Heneghan 0-1.	Report	D McSharry 0-6, J McGuinness 1-1, D Rooney 0-3, P McGowan 0-2, M Ferguson 0-1, J Connolly 0-1.

=== Connacht final ===
15 November 2015 Final	Moycullen	0-08 - 0-09	Hollymount–Carramore	Pearse Stadium
	P Ó Cuaig 0-4, D Ó Gaothín 0-3, G Braidseach 0-1.		D Coen 0-4, D Kelly 0-2, I Costello 0-2, K Feerick 0-1.

== Leinster Intermediate Club Football Championship ==
=== Leinster first round ===
17 October 2015 First round	St Patrick's	0-11 - 2-12	Ratoath	Robbie Farrell Park
	S Walsh 0-3, D Styles 0-3, S Keogh 0-1, J Lynders 0-1, Niall Collins 0-1, Nicky Collins 0-1, P Knight 0-1.		B McMahon 0-6, C Rooney 1-1, F Coyne 1-1, B O'Brien 0-2, E Boyle 0-1, B O'Connor 0-1,

18 October 2015 First round	Glynn–Barntown	2-15 - 0-12	Kilkerley Emmets	Killurin Grounds
	I Moran 2-1, M O'Regan 0-4, R Dempsey 0-2, Brendan Doyle 0-2, M Doyle 0-2, C Neville 0-1, Barry Doyle 0-1, A Kehoe 0-1, R Crosbie 0-1.		S Lennon 0-8, T McEneaney 0-2, C Clarke 0-1, S Hand 0-1.

18 October 2015 First round	Ballymanus	0-08 - 3-12	Athlone	Aughrim County Ground
	M Kenny 0-2, R Lynch 0-2, P Byrne 0-2, R Stapleton 0-1, P Murray 0-1.		R Connellan 2-4, J Stapleton 1-0, J Connellan 0-2, M Greene 0-2, P Bannon 0-1.

24 October 2015 First round	Castledermot	0-08 - 0-05	Clonaslee–St Manman's	St Conleth's Park
	G Keating 0-2, A Murphy 0-2, P Murphy 0-2, D Keating 0-1, G Farrell 0-1.		G McEvoy 0-3, J Molloy 0-1, D Hogan 0-1.

=== Leinster quarter-finals ===
1 November 2015 Quarter-final	Castledermot	2-15 - 1-15	Ballycumber	St Conleth's Park
	G Keating 1-8, E O'Keeffe 1-2, D Keating 0-3, G Farrell 0-1, V Dowling 0-1.		C Quinn 1-2, R Dunne 0-5, J Lowry 0-3, F Daly 0-3, S Hackett 0-1, G Larkin 0-1.

1 November 2015 Quarter-final	Glynn–Barntown	1-10 - 0-12	Rathcline	Killurin Grounds
	M O'Regan 0-4, M Joyce 0-4, S Carmody 1-0, C Doyle 0-1, B Doyle 0-1.		S Kenny 0-6, J Hanley 0-3, R Clyne 0-1, J Carroll 0-1, D Rooney 0-1.

1 November 2015 Quarter-final	Athlone	1-12 - 1-04	O'Hanrahans	Páirc Chiaráin
	J Connellan 0-5, D Kelly 1-0, R Connellan 0-3, N Mulligan 0-3, S Ward 0-1.		D Hayden 1-1, D Thompson 0-2, L Walker 0-1.

1 November 2015 Quarter-final	Ratoath	2-19 - 0-06	Railyard	Seán Eiffe Park
	C O'Brien 1-3, B McMahon 0-6, G McGowan 1-1, J Wallace 0-2, K McCabe 0-2, C Rooney 0-1, F Coyne 0-1, P Quinn 0-1, G Rooney 0-1, B O'Brien 0-1.		C Roche 0-3, E Roche 0-2, B Cahill 0-1.

=== Leinster semi-finals ===
15 November 2015 Semi-final	Ratoath	3-13 - 1-06	Castledermot	Seán Eiffe Park
	B O'Brien 2-1, B McMahon 0-5, E Wallace 1-1, J Wallace 0-3, C Wallace 0-3.	Report	G Keating 0-5, E O'Keeffe 1-1.

15 November 2015 Semi-final	Glynn–Barntown	0-06 - 1-06	Athlone	Killurin Grounds
	M O'Regan 0-2, C Doyle 0-1, J Lacey 0-1, S Carmody 0-1, R Crosbie 0-1.	Report	J Marshment 1-0, J Connellan 0-3, R Connellan 0-2, M Darling 0-1.

=== Leinster final ===
28 November 2015 Final	Athlone	2-09 - 2-13	Ratoath	Cusack Park
	J Connellan 0-6, J Stapleton 1-1, S Omukor 1-0, J Quinn 0-1, R Connellan 0-1.	Report	B McMahon 1-9, C Rooney 1-1, E Wallace 0-1, J Wallace 0-1, B O'Brien 0-1.

== Munster Intermediate Club Football Championship ==
=== Munster quarter-finals ===
25 October 2015 Quarter-final	Ballinameela	1-06 - 1-10	Oola	Fraher Field
	T Curran (1-1), B Phelan (0-3f) and S Flavin (0-2).	Report	I Bourke (1-2), J Ryan (0-4f), J Bourke, D Quirke, P Bourke and D O’Donovan (0-1 each).

1 November 2015 Quarter-final	Upperchurch–Drombane	1-10 - 2-12	St Mary's	Leahy Park
	P Shanahan 0-4, C Stapleton 0-4F, P Shortt 1-0, A Kinane 0-2.	Report	Daniel Daly 1-3 (1F), A Walsh 1-1, N O’Driscoll 0-3, B Sheehan 0-3F, Denis Daly 0-1, A Counane 0-1

=== Munster semi-finals ===
14 November 2015 Semi-final	St Mary's	4-21 - 0-01	Corofin	Con Keating Park
	Daniel Daly (1-6), P O’Donoghue (1-3), N O’Driscoll (1-2), and B Sheehan (0-4, 3 frees), C O’Shea (1-0), A Walsh and S Cournane (0-2 each), L O’Connell and Denis Daly (0-1 each)	Report	D Ryan (0-1, free)

15 November 2015 Semi-final	Carrigaline	2-08 - 0-05	Oola	FitzGerald Park
	D Drake (1-3, three frees), S O’Brien (1-0), B Coakley (0-3, two frees), B O’Keeffe and E O’Connor (0-1 each).	Report	J Ryan (0-5, four frees).

=== Munster final ===
28 November 2015 Final	St Mary's	1-16 - 0-09	Carrigaline	FitzGerald Stadium
	Denis Daly (1-3); Daniel Daly (0-4); B Sheehan (0-2 frees, 0-1 ‘45), S Cournane (0-3 each); P O’Donoghue (0-2); A Walsh (0-1).	Report	B Coakley (0-6, 0-3 frees); B O’Keeffe, S O’Brien, D Drake (0-1 each).

== Ulster Intermediate Club Football Championship ==
=== Ulster preliminary round ===
18 October 2015 Preliminary round	Loughinisland	2-15 - 0-11	St Oliver Plunketts Greenlough	Páirc Esler
	R Mason 0-5, D Gordon 1-0, G Johnston 1-0, C Megoran 0-3, J Flynn 0-2, S Mason 0-2, R Stranney 0-1, D McLaughlin 0-1, A McClements 0-1.	Report	E Lynn 0-6, N Loughlin 0-3, N Bradley 0-1, R Tohill 0-1.

=== Ulster quarter-finals ===
1 November 2015 Quarter-final	Glenavy St Joseph's	1-15 - 2-11	Irvinestown St Molaise	Corrigan Park
	O Gallagher 1-2, N McCann 0-4, P Gallagher 0-3, M McCourt 0-1, C Loney 0-1, C Gallagher 0-1, F Cunningham 0-1, J Gallagher 0-1, F Green 0-1.		G Maguire 1-3, J Duffy 1-1, R Campbell 0-2, K McDonnell 0-1, R Ormsby 0-1, S Sheridan 0-1, K Duffy 0-1, R Cassidy 0-1.

1 November 2015 Quarter-final	Ballyhaise	1-10 - 0-15	Doohamlet	Kingspan Breffni Park
	S Smith 0-7, D Brady 1-1, K Tierney 0-1, P Moore 0-1.		B McGinn 0-8, B McBennett 0-4, C McManus 0-1, J Walshe 0-1, P McArdle 0-1.

1 November 2015 Quarter-final	Edendork St Malachy's	2-05 - 1-13	Loughinisland	Healy Park
	J Ferguson 1-1, J McGuckin 1-0, D McCurry 0-1, N Morgan 0-1, H Óg Conlan 0-1, B McGuckin 0-1.		R Mason 1-4, A McClements 0-3, P McKenny 0-2, D Gordon 0-1, C Megoran 0-1, J McCarthy 0-1, R Deegan 0-1.

1 November 2015 Quarter-final	Réalt na Mara	0-14 - 1-09 (aet)	Clann Éireann	Fr Tierney Park
	T Hourihane 0-4, C Keaney 0-4, D Hoye 0-2, G Clancy 0-2, D Spratt 0-1, F McTiernan 0-1.		B Seeley 0-9, J McDaid 1-0.

=== Ulster semi-finals ===
15 November 2015 Semi-final	Réalt na Mara	1-12 - 1-07	Glenavy St Joseph's	Páirc Esler
	C Keaney 1-5, T Hourihane 0-3, G Clancy 0-2, D Spratt 0-1, J Boyle 0-1.		F Cunningham 1-1, J Gallagher 0-4, O Gallagher 0-1, J Philips 0-1.

15 November 2015 Semi-final	Loughinisland	4-07 - 1-07	Doohamlet	Athletic Grounds
	R Mason 0-5, D Gordon 1-0, S Mason 1-0, C Megoran 1-0, P McKenny 1-0, S O'Hare 0-2.	Report	B McGinn 1-6, J Walshe 0-1.

=== Ulster final ===
29 November 2015 Final	Loughinisland	4-01 - 0-07	Réalt na Mara	Owenbeg Centre of Excellence
	R Mason 1-1, S O'Hare 1-0, P McKenny 1-0, S Cochrane 1-0.	Report	A Russell 0-2, J Boyle 0-1, G Clancy 0-1, T Hourihane 0-1, C Keaney 0-1, J Brennan 0-1.

== All-Ireland Intermediate Club Football Championship ==
=== All-Ireland semi-finals ===
24 January 2016 Semi-final	Hollymount Carramore	0-15 - 0-10	Loughinisland	Kingspan Breffni Park
	D Coen (0-8), K Feerick (0-3), I Costello (0-1), C Keane (0-1), K McNamara (0-1), S Coen (0-1).	Report	R Mason (0-5), A McClements (0-1), J McCarthy (0-1), S Mason (0-1), P McKenny (0-1), C McGoran (0-1).

24 January 2016 Semi-final	St Mary's	2-20 - 1-05	Ratoath	Gaelic Grounds
	B Sheehan (0-7, 0-7 frees); S Cournane (1-4, 0-3 frees); P O’Donoghue (0-4); Denis Daly (0-3); C O’Shea (0-2).	Report	C O’Brien (1-0); B McMahon (0-3, 0-2 frees); C Rooney (0-1 free), E Wallace (0-1).

=== All-Ireland final ===
6 February 2016 Final	St Mary's	2-10 - 0-10	Hollymount Carramore	Croke Park
	Daniel Daly 1-1; B Sheehan 0-3 (1f); A Cournane 1-0; P O’Donoghue 0-2; C O’Shea, S Cournane (f), L O’Connell, D Casey 0-1 each.	Report	D Coen 0-3 (2fs); I Costello, C Keane 0-2 each; R Molloy, B Sheridan, K Costello 0-1 each.

== Championship statistics ==
=== Top scorers ===
Rank	Player	Club	Tally	Total	Matches	Average
1	Bryan McMahon	Ratoath	1-29	32	5	6.40
2	Rory Mason	Loughinisland	2-20	26	5	5.20
3	Darren Coen	Hollymount Carramore	1-21	24	4	6.00
4	Daniel Daly	St Mary's	3-14	23	5	4.60
5	Bryan Sheehan	St Mary's	0-20	20	5	4.00
6	Gavin Keating	Castledermot	1-15	18	3	6.00
7	Barry McGinn	Doohamlet	1-14	17	2	8.50
8	Ray Connellan	Castledermot	2-10	16	4	4.00
9	Paul O'Donoghue	St Mary's	1-11	14	5	2.80
10	Christy Keaney	Réalt na Mara	1-10	13	3	4.33
10	Seán Cournane	St Mary's	1-10	13	5	2.60
