= 2021–22 All-Ireland Intermediate Club Football Championship =

Irish Gaelic football competition

- Sponsor: Allied Irish Bank
- Champions: Steelstown (1st title); Neil Forester (captain); High McGrath (manager)
- Runners-up: Trim; Alan Douglas (captain); Kevin Reilly (manager)

The 2021–22 All-Ireland Intermediate Club Football Championship was the 18th staging of the All-Ireland Intermediate Club Football Championship since its establishment by the Gaelic Athletic Association for the 2003–04 season.

The All-Ireland final was played on 6 February 2022 at Croke Park in Dublin, between Steelstown and Trim. Steelstown won the match by 3–14 to 2–05 to claim their first ever championship title.

== Connacht Intermediate Club Football Championship ==
=== Connacht quarter-final ===
27 November 2021 Quarter-final	Dromahair	0-05 - 2-13	Naomh Anna, Leitir Móir	Páirc Sheáin Uí Eslin
	Feeney 0-2, J Clancy 0-2, G Fowley 0-1.		A Ó Fatharta 1-1, W Seoige 1-1, O Mac Donncha 0-3, Dylan Seoige 0-2, ME Bairéad 0-1, C Seoige 0-1, E Ó Fatharta 0-1, K Ó Ceallaigh 0-1, I Ó Curraoin 0-1, T Ó Curraoin 0-1.

=== Connacht semi-finals ===
4 December 2021 Semi-final	St. Faithleach's	1-12 - 1-11 (aet)	St. Farnan's	Dr. Hyde Park
	C Murtagh 1-1, D Murtagh 0-4, C Kennelly 0-2, M Dunne 0-1, S Walsh 0-1, D Hussey 0-1, J Hussey 0-1, D Rooney 0-1.	Report	P O'Connor 1-6, F Cawley 0-2, D Hallinan 0-1, G Connolly 0-1, S Mulligan 0-1.	Referee: M McGirl (Leitrim)

11 December 2021 Semi-final	Naomh Anna, Leitir Móir	3-12 - 1-14 (aet)	Mayo Gaels	Pearse Stadium
	É Ó Loingsigh 1-5, ME Bairéad 1-0, O Mac Donncha 1-0, W Seoige 0-2, F Breathnach 0-2, É Ó Fátharta 0-1, C Bairéad 0-1, I Ó Curraoin 0-1.		J Gallagher 0-5, J Fallon 1-0, E Henry 0-3, S Keane 0-2, A Gallagher 0-2, K Lynch 0-1, J Jennings 0-1.

=== Connacht final ===
16 January 2022 Final	St. Faithleach's	2-14 - 2-12	Naomh Anna, Leitir Móir	Pearse Stadium
	D Murtagh 1-6 (1f, 1m); C Kennelly 0-3; M Cox 1-0; D Rooney (1 ’45), J Hussey (1m) 0-2 each; C Murtagh 0-1.	Report	Dylan Seoige (0-4, 1f, 1m); O Mac Donnacha (0-3, all frees), M E Bairéad (1-0), W Seoige (1-0), M Mac Donnacha (0-2); A Ó Fátharta (0-1), I Ó Curraoin (0-1), F Breathnach (0-1).	Referee: B Judge (Sligo)

== Leinster Intermediate Club Football Championship ==
=== Leinster first round ===
20 November 2021 First round	St Brigid's, Killashee	0-07 - 6-10	Clara	Glennon Brothers Pearse Park
	D Farrell 0-6, M Shanley 0-1.	Report	C Stewart 2-0, J Fleming 2-0, R Brady 1-2, C Delaney 1-1, C O'Meara 0-2, G Guilfoyle 0-1, S Brady 0-1, E Cullen 0-1, M Mitchell 0-1, C Egan 0-1.

20 November 2021 First round	Naomh Eoin	1-03 - 1-16	Park–Ratheniska	Netwatch Cullen Park
	A Hogan 1-0, C Tracey 0-1, K Hogan 0-1, C Foley 0-1.		K Delaney 0-6, J Connolly 0-6, MG Delaney 1-1, S Tierney 0-2, M Fingleton 0-1.

20 November 2021 First round	An Tóchar	0-07 - 0-15	Kilcock	Pearse Park
	M Nolan 0-3, B Kennedy 0-1, J Cardiff 0-1, J Brady 0-1, C McKenna 0-1.		E McArdle 0-3, D Courtney 0-2, C Divilly 0-2, S O'Rourke 0-2, S Farrell 0-2, L Sheridan 0-1, D McArdle 0-1, E Mulhall 0-1, J Gibbons 0-1.

24 November 2021 First round	Trim	1-14 - 2-07	St. Fechin's	Ashbourne Grounds
	A Lynch 0-6 three frees; A Douglas 1-2; J Toher 0-2 one free; D Lynch 0-1; C Caulfield 0-1; R Bourke 0-1; M Cullen 0-1.	Report	R Walsh 1-6 1-3 frees, one mark; P Matthews 1-0; E Hackett 0-1.

=== Leinster quarter-finals ===
4 December 2021 Quarter-final	Park–Ratheniska	0-05 - 1-08	Crossabeg–Ballymurn	MW Hire O'Moore Park
	K Delaney (0-3, 1 free), J Connolly (0-1), G Delany (0-1)	Report	A Butler (0-4 frees), M O’Connor (1-0), O Foley (0-2), P Foley (0-1); C Kinlough (0-1).	Referee: M Stones (Offaly)

4 December 2021 Quarter-final	Trim	1-13 - 1-04	Thomastown	Ashbourne Grounds
	A Lynch 0-7 two frees; M Cullen 1-2; A Douglas 0-3; R Bourke 0-1; J Murray 0-1.	Report	R Monks 1-4 1-0 penalty, three frees.

4 December 2021 Quarter-final	Tang	0-08 - 1-13	Kilcock	Tubberclair Grounds
	N Bannon 0-4, J Keenan 0-2, M Rock 0-1, A Neary 0-1.		S O'Rourke 0-4, D Courtney 1-0, C Divilly 0-3, D McArdle 0-3, D Acton 0-1, E McArdle 0-1, S Farrell 0-1.

4 December 2021 Quarter-final	St Patrick's, Donabate	0-09 - 2-10	Clara	Parnell Park
	M Molloy 0-2, D Knight-Sands 0-1 (mark), A Dunne 0-1 (0-1f), O Brooks 0-1, A Darby 0-1, S McGrath 0-1, S Dempsey 0-1 (0-1f), S Walshe 0-1 (0-1f).	Report	R Brady 1-4 (0-3f), C Doyle 1-0, C Stewart 0-3, J Fleming 0-1, C O’Meara 0-1, C Egan, 0-1.

=== Leinster semi-finals ===
18 December 2021 Semi-final	Clara	1-09 - 1-07	Kilcock	Bord na Móna O'Connor Park
	J Fleming 1-1, D Falsey 0-3, C Doyle 0-1, G Guilfoyle 0-1, C Egan 0-1, C Delaney 0-1, P Smith 0-1.		F Nairn 1-0, J Gibbons 0-1, S Farrell 0-1, L Sheridan 0-1, C McCarthy 0-1, S O'Rourke 0-1, D Acton 0-1, D McArdel 0-1.

18 December 2021 Semi-final	Trim	2-15 - 0-10	Crossabeg–Ballymurn	Páirc Tailteann
	A Lynch 0-6 two frees; M Cullen 1-2; C Quigley 1-0; A Douglas 0-3; J Murray 0-2; R Bourke 0-1; S Fitzgerald 0-1.	Report	A Butler 0-4 frees; O Foley 0-2; C Devereux 0-1; P Foley 0-1; M O'Connor 0-1; B Eviston 0-1.	Referee: K Harris (Kildare)

=== Leinster final ===
16 January 2022 Final	Trim	1-15 - 2-08	Clara	Páirc Tailteann
	A Lynch 1-7 (3 frees); M Cullen and E O’Connor 0-2 each; R Bourke, C Caulfield, C Joyce and J Toher (f) 0-1 each.	Report	R Brady 1-3 (0-2f); C O’Meara 1-0; L Hiney, M Mitchell, P Smith (f), J Fleming and C Delaney 0-1 each.	Referee: J Hickey (Carlow)

== Munster Intermediate Club Football Championship ==
=== Munster quarter-finals ===
4 December 2021 Quarter-final	Drom-Inch	1-08 - 0-06	Portlaw	Longorchard Grounds
	D Butler (1-1), J Mullen (0-4,3fs), S Nolan, J Ryan, R Long (0-1 each).	Report	J Power (0-4,4fs), M Donnelly (f), D J Foran (0-1 each).	Referee: D O'Callaghan (Limerick)

5 December 2021 Quarter-final	Corofin	1-13 - 1-06	Kildimo-Pallaskenry	Páirc Finne
	D Kelly (1-7, 1f); J Malone, G Cahill (2f) (0-2 each); K Keane, R Mounsey (0-1 each).	Report	P Nash (1-4, 4f); C Downes, L O’Sullivan (0-1 each).	Referee: J Bermingham (Cork)

=== Munster semi-finals ===
19 December 2021 Semi-final	Corofin	1-14 - 0-11	Newmarket	Mallow GAA Complex
	R Mousney 0-5; G Cahill 0-4 (all frees); D Cahill 1-1 (one free); J Malone, K Keane, E Clancy, D Ryan 0-1 each.	Report	R O’Keeffe 0-5 (all frees); C O’Keeffe 0-3 (two frees); D O’Keeffe, C Browne, B O’Connor 0-1 each.	Referee: J Hayes (Limerick)

19 December 2021 Semi-final	Na Gaeil	1-10 - 0-09	Drom-Inch	Longorchard Grounds
	D Carmody (1-7, 3fs, 1m), D Goggin, J Bourke and E O’Neill (0-1 each)	Report	J Mullen (0-6 frees), J Moloney, P Campion and M Campion (0-1 each)	Referee: N Quinn (Clare)

=== Munster final ===
16 January 2022 Final	Na Gaeil	6-15 - 1-12	Corofin	Mallow GAA Complex
	D Carmody (2-5, 1-0 pen, 0-2 frees), J Sheehan (2-2), J Bourke (1-1), D O’Connor (1-0), D Goggin (0-3), J O’Connor, J Barry, E Doody and D Reen (0-1 each).		G Cahill (0-5, 0-4 frees, 0-1 m), J Malone (0-4), D O’Loughlin (1-0 pen), G Kelly (0-2), D Cahill (0-1 free).	Referee: J Hayes (Limerick)

== Ulster Intermediate Club Football Championship ==
=== Ulster final ===
9 January 2022 Final	Steelstown	0-06 - 0-04	Moortown St Malachy's	Derry COE
	C McMonagle (0-5, 0-2 frees), E Deane (0-1).		P Devlin (0-3, 0-2 frees, 0-1 mark), C Heron (0-1).	Referee: C Dourneen (Cavan)

== All-Ireland Intermediate Club Football Championship ==
=== All-Ireland semi-finals ===
29 January 2022 Semi-final	Steelstown	2-06 - 0-07	Na Gaeil	Connacht COE
	B McCarron (1-4, 3f); C McMonagle (1-1, 1-0 pen); M Murray (0-1).	Report	J Barry, D O’Connor (0-2 each), D Carmody (1f), J Bourke, A Barry (0-1 each).	Referee: J Gilmartin (Sligo)

29 January 2022 Semi-final	Trim	1-11 - 0-11	St. Faithleach's	The Downs Grounds
	A Lynch 1-5, M Cullen 0-2, J Toher 0-1, C Quigley 0-1, D Lynch 0-1, E O'Connor 0-1.	Report	C Murtagh 0-5, D Murtagh 0-4, C Kennelly 0-1, D Rooney 0-1.

=== All-Ireland final ===
6 February 2022 Final	Steelstown	3-14 - 2-05	Trim	Croke Park
	B McCarron 1-4 (2m, 1f), C McMonagle 1-4 (1 pen, 3f), E Deane 1-0, O McMenamin 0-2, E Bradley 0-2, R Devine 0-1, N Forester 0-1	Report	A Lynch 0-4 (3f, 1M), E O’Connor 1-0, M Cullen 1-0, C O’Rourke 0-1.	Referee: B JUdge (Sligo)
