= Paul Clancy =

Irish Gaelic footballer (1976–2026)

Personal information
- Native name: Pól Mac Lannchaidh (Irish)
- Born: 7 September 1976 Moycullen, County Galway, Ireland
- Died: 22 June 2026 (aged 49) Moycullen, County Galway, Ireland
- Occupation: Electrician
- Height: 6 ft 0 in (183 cm)

Sport
- Sport: Gaelic football
- Position: Right wing-forward
Club
- Years: Club
- Moycullen
Club titles
- Galway titles: 0
Inter-county
- Years: County
- 1996-2006: Galway
Inter-county titles
- Connacht titles: 5
- All-Irelands: 2
- NFL: 0
- All Stars: 0

Paul Clancy (7 September 1976 – 22 June 2026) was an Irish Gaelic football player, manager, selector and administrator. At club level, he played with Moycullen and at inter-county level with the Galway senior football team.

== Playing career ==
Clancy attended St Mary's College in Galway and played in all grades of Gaelic football during his time there, including the Connacht Colleges SAFC. At club level, he first played for Moycullen at juvenile and underage levels before progressing to adult level. Clancy was part of the Moycullen team that beat Fingal Ravens by 2–09 to 1–06 to win the All-Ireland Club IFC title in February 2008.

At inter-county level, Clancy first played for Galway as part of the minor team that was beaten by Kerry in the 1994 All-Ireland MFC final. His time with the under-21 team yielded a Connacht U21FC medal in 1996.

Clancy made his senior team debut in 1996. He won five Connacht SFC medals between 1998 and 2005. A leg injury ruled Clancy out of most of the 1998 campaign, however, he won an All-Ireland SFC medal in September 1998, after coming on as a substitute in the 1–14 to 1–10 win over Kildare in the All-Ireland SFC final. He claimed a second All-Ireland SFC medal two years later, after scoring two points in the defeat of Meath in the 2001 All-Ireland SFC final. Clancy brought his inter-county career to an end in 2006.

== Coaching career ==
Clancy was involved in coaching at all levels with his home club. He was also part of the Dublin Institute of Technology (DIT) management team for the Sigerson Cup, as well as guiding DIT to the All-Ireland freshers' title in 2009. Clancy was a selector with Laois, alongside manager Justin McNulty, during their successful bid for promotion to Division 1 of the National League in 2011. He later succeeded Anthony Cunningham as Garryscastle manager. Clancy was a selector with the Galway under-21 team that won the All-Ireland U21FC title in 2013. He progressed to being a selector with the senior team during Alan Mulholland's tenure as manager in 2014. Clancy served as Moycullen club chairman between 2019 and 2023.

== Personal life and death ==
Clancy was born in Moycullen, County Galway, Ireland on 7 September 1976. He died on 22 June 2026, at the age of 49, following an extended illness.

== Honours ==
=== Player ===
Moycullen

- All-Ireland Intermediate Club Football Championship (1): 2008
- Connacht Intermediate Club Football Championship (1): 2007
- Galway Intermediate Football Championship (1): 2007

Galway

- All-Ireland Senior Football Championship (2): 1998, 2001
- Connacht Senior Football Championship (5): 1998, 2000, 2002, 2003, 2005
- Connacht Under-21 Football Championship (1): 1996
- Connacht Minor Football Championship (1): 1994

=== Management ===
Dublin Institute of Technology

- All-Ireland Freshers' Football Championship (1): 2009

Galway

- All-Ireland Under-21 Football Championship (1): 2013
- Connacht Under-21 Football Championship (1): 2013
