= 2014–15 All-Ireland Intermediate Club Football Championship =

Irish Gaelic football competition

- Sponsor: Allied Irish Bank
- Champions: Ardfert (2nd title); Jerry Wallace (captain)
- Runners-up: St. Croan's

The 2014–15 All-Ireland Intermediate Club Football Championship was the 12th staging of the All-Ireland Intermediate Club Football Championship since its establishment by the Gaelic Athletic Association for the 2003–04 season.

The All-Ireland final was played on 14 February 2015 at Croke Park in Dublin, between Ardfert and St. Croan's. Ardfert won the match by 1–14 to 0–09 to claim their second championship title overall and a first title in eight years.
