= Darren Dinneen =

Irish hurler

Darren Dineen
Personal information
- Born: County Kerry, Ireland
- Height: 6 ft 1 in (185 cm)

Sport
- Sport: Hurling
- Position: Forward
Clubs
- Years: Club
- St Brendan's, Ardfert
Club titles
- Kerry titles: 1
Inter-county
- Years: County
- 200?-: Kerry
Inter-county titles
- Munster titles: 0
- All-Irelands: 0
- All Stars: 1

Darren Dineen is a hurler from County Kerry. He plays hurling with Kerry and St Brendan's, Ardfert and also plays football with Ardfert. In 2011 he helped Kerry win their first Christy Ring Cup when they beat Wicklow in the final. He played in the 2013 final but lost out to Down, he later won a Christy Ring All Star.

With Ardfert he was part of the teams that won Kerry Junior Football Championship, Munster Junior Club Football Championship and All-Ireland Junior Club Football Championship, he has also won Kerry Intermediate Football Championship, Munster Intermediate Club Football Championship and All-Ireland Intermediate Club Football Championship.

He won a Kerry U21 Hurling Championship with St Brendan's, Ardfert in 2005. In 2013 he help St Brendan's win a first Senior County title in 23 years.
