= 2024–25 All-Ireland Intermediate Club Football Championship =

Irish Gaelic football competition

- Dates: 2 November 2024 – 26 January 2025
- Teams: 32
- Sponsor: Allied Irish Bank
- Champions: Crossmolina Deel Rovers (1st title); Mikie Loftus (captain); Brian Benson (manager)
- Runners-up: Ballinderry Shamrocks; Gareth McKinless (captain); Jarlath Bell (manager)

Tournament statistics
- Matches played: 28
- Goals scored: 62 (2.21 per match)
- Points scored: 560 (20 per match)
- Top scorer: Darragh Swords (1-19)

Provincial Champions
- Munster: Austin Stacks
- Leinster: Caragh
- Ulster: Ballinderry Shamrocks
- Connacht: Crossmolina Deel Rovers

The 2024–25 All-Ireland Intermediate Club Football Championship was the 21st staging of the All-Ireland Intermediate Club Football Championship since its establishment by the Gaelic Athletic Association for the 2003–04 season. The championship ran from November 2024 to January 2025 and was won by Crossmolina Deel Rovers.

== Connacht Intermediate Club Football Championship ==
=== Connacht quarter-final ===
9 November 2024 Quarter-final	Eastern Harps (Sligo)	1-12 - 1-03	Melvin Gaels (Leitrim)	Seán O'Heslin Memorial Park
	J Kiernan 1-0; D Lyons, R Mulligan, T Taheny, C Walsh & S O’Hara 0-2 each; S O’Grady (f) & C Hunt 0-1 each	Report	S McGloin 1-0; P McGowan 0-2; J McGloin 0-1, 1f

=== Connacht semi-finals ===
16 November 2024 Semi-final	St Michael's (Galway)	1-07 - 2-13	Crossmolina Deel Rovers (Mayo)	Hastings Insurance MacHale Park
	R Mac Giolla Rí 1-0, G Higgins 0-1, B Harlowe 0-1, E Brannigan 0-1, F Cruise 0-1, B Madden 0-1, L Kerin 0-1, G Somerville 0-1.	Report	C Loftus 1-1, FDuffy 0-4, N Coggins 1-0, D Coggins 0-3, P Leddy 0-2, J Maheady 0-2, J Flynn 0-1.

16 November 2024 Semi-final	Elphin (Roscommon)	0-09 - 0-07	Eastern Harps (Sligo)	Dr Hyde Park
	A Brady 0-2, S Killoran 0-2, F Cregg 0-2, D Cregg 0-1, G Cregg 0-1, J Finnerty 0-1.	Report	C Hunt 0-3, R Mulligan 0-1, M Clarke 0-1, S O'Hara 0-1, M Henry 0-1.

=== Connacht final ===
24 November 2024 Final	Elphin (Roscommon)	1-06 - 1-07	Crossmolina Deel Rovers (Mayo)	Dr Hyde Park
	F Cregg 0-5 (4f), J Finnerty 1-0pen, A Brady 0-1f.	Report	F Duffy 0-4 (3f), N Coggins 1-0, J Maheady 0-3 (1m, 1f).

== Leinster Intermediate Club Football Championship ==
The draw for the Leinster Club Championship took place in June 2024.

=== Leinster round 1 ===
2 November 2024 Round 1	Caragh (Kildare)	0-11 - 0-06	Meath Hill (Meath)	Manguard Park
	D Swords 0-7 (5 frees), J Gannon 0-1, A Nevin 0-1, R Doorey 0-1, R Burke 0-1.	Report	C Sheehy 0-4 (1 free), G Breslin 0-2 (1 free).

2 November 2024 Round 1	Dundalk Gaels (Louth)	0-07 - 0-08	Naomh Mearnóg (Dublin)	McGeogh Park
	D McKeown (0-4, 3f), T O’Connell (0-1, 1mark), D McComish (0-1), G Shevlin (0-1).	Report	S Kavanagh (0-3, 3f), K Lynch-Bissett (0-2, 1f), G Nangle (0-1), F O’Connor (0-1), S Hawkshaw (0-1).

2 November 2024 Round 1	Crettyard (Laois)	1-11 - 0-11	Fr Manning Gaels (Longford)	Laois Hire O'Moore Park
	B Brennan 0-5 (0-3 frees), A Whelan 1-1, C Murphy 0-4 (0-2 45’s, 0-1 free), M Nash 0-1.	Report	M Cassidy 0-7 (0-4 frees), M Hughes and P Gill 0-2 each.

2 November 2024 Round 1	Fenagh (Carlow)	0-09 - 0-11	Garrycastle (Westmeath)	Netwatch Cullen Park
	P Hynes 0-6 (6f), J Tracey 0-1, C Lomax 0-1, S Murphy 0-1.	Report	M Monaghan 0-3 (2f), C Cosgrove 0-2, J Sheerin 0-2 (1f), J Nugent 0-1; C Mannion 0-1, E Mulvihill 0-1, J Carroll 0-1.

=== Leinster quarter-finals ===
9 November 2024 Quarter-final	Clonbullogue (Offaly)	0-13 - 0-18	Garrycastle (Westmeath)	Gracefield Grounds
	K O'Neill 0-5 (2f), J Guing 0-4 (1f), H Judge 0-2, R O'Neill 0-1, C O’Neill 0-1 (45).	Report	C Cosgrove 0-6 (0-3f), A Monaghan 0-3, M Monaghan 0-2 (1f), J Nugent 0-2, S Brennan 0-2f, E Mulvihill 0-1, C Mannion 0-1, J Dolan 0-1.

9 November 2024 Quarter-final	Dicksboro (Kilkenny)	0-07 - 5-10	Caragh (Kildare)	Páirc Lachtáin
	E Moylan (0-3, 0-3 fs); S Stapleton (0-2, 0-2 fs); B Sheehan, L Moore (0-1 each)	Report	J Corrigan (2-3); D Campbell (2-0); R Doorey (1-2); D Swords (0-4, 0-2 fs); J Gannon (0-1)

9 November 2024 Quarter-final	Fethard St Mogue's (Wexford)	2-13 - 2-04	Carnew Emmets (Wicklow)	O'Kennedy Park
	J Turbitt 0-7, R Waters 1-1, C Molloy 1-0, E Whelan 0-2, S Nunan 0-1, C Byrne 0-1, J Molloy 0-1,	Report	C McCrea 1-1, P Doran 1-0, B Brosnan 0-2, R Greene 0-1.

9 November 2024 Quarter-final	Naomh Mearnóg (Dublin)	0-08 - 0-04	Crettyard (Laois)	Parnell Park
	S Kavanagh (2f), S Hawkshaw 0-2 each; K Lynch Bissett, H Collier, C Madden, E Kelly 0-1 apiece. Crettyard: C Murphy 0-4 (1f, 1 ‘45’).	Report

=== Leinster semi-finals ===
23 November 2024 Semi-final	Naomh Mearnóg (Dublin)	2-10 - 1-12	Garrycastle (Westmeath)	Parnell Park
	B Deay and K Lynch Bissett (0-1f) 1-2 each; H Collier 0-3; T Cosgrove 0-2; S Hawkshaw 0-1.	Report	J Carroll 1-0; C Cosgrove 0-3 (3f); B Donegan and E Monaghan 0-2 each; J Dolan, J Nugent, R McGowan, C McCarthy and M Monaghan (f) 0-1 each.

23 November 2024 Semi-final	Caragh (Kildare)	2-19 - 2-13 (aet)	Fethard St Mogue's (Wexford)	Manguard Park
	D Swords 1-6 (3fs), J Corrigan 1-3, R Doorey 0-4 (2fs), E O’Haire 0-3 (2fs), D Murray 0-2; F McKennedy 0-1.	Report	Eoin Whelan 2-4 (0-1f), John Tubritt 0-4 (1f), Richard Waters 0-2; Cillian Byrne 0-1, Cian Byrne 0-1, Jake Molloy 0-1.

=== Leinster final ===
30 November 2024 Final	Naomh Mearnóg (Dublin)	0-08 - 0-13	Caragh (Kildare)	Parnell Park
	K Lynch Bassett 0-4 (2fs,1’45), S Kavanagh 0-2 (1f); T Cosgrove 0-1; B Deay 0-1.	Report	J Corrigan 0-5, D Swords 0-2, C Sullivan 0-1, R Burke 0-1, E O’Haire 0-1 (f); J Gannon 0-1, R Doorey 0-1, D Campbell 0-1.

== Munster Intermediate Club Football Championship ==
The draw for the Munster Club Championship took place on 25 July 2024.

=== Munster quarter-finals ===
10 November 2024 Quarter-final	Kilshannig (Cork)	2-12 - 1-09	Rathkeale (Limerick)	O'Connell Park
	Diarmuid O’Sullivan 1-2, É O’Hanlon 0-4, Darragh O’Sullivan 1-0, T Cunningham, K Twomey 0-2 each, K O’Hanlon (f), C O’Sullivan 0-1 each.	Report	A White 0-4 f, B Meade 1-0, M Morrissey 0-3 (0-1 45), B Coleman, A Meade 0-1 each.

10 November 2024 Quarter-final	Stradbally (Waterford)	1-07 - 1-12	Aherlow (Tipperary)	Fraher Field
	D Weldon 1-0, M O'Brien 0-3, J Mullaney 0-2, P Skehan 0-1, M Mullaney 0-1.	Report	B Grogan 1-8, B Carey 0-3, M Russell 0-1.

=== Munster semi-finals ===
24 November 2024 Semi-final	Kilshannig (Cork)	0-06 - 1-12	Austin Stacks (Kerry)	O'Connell Park
	E O’Hanlon 0-4 (0-2 m, 0-1 f), Darragh O’Sullivan 0-2 f.	Report	P Lane 1-2 (0-1 f), C Purcell 0-2, D Casey, J Nagle, J O’Shea, M O’Donnell, J Kissane (f), J O’Connor, D McKivergan (f), D Kirby 0-1 each.

24 November 2024 Semi-final	Aherlow (Tipperary)	1-06 - 0-08	Wolfe Tones na Sionna (Clare)	Hannon Park
	B Grogan 0-5, B Carey 1-0, C Dillon 0-1.	Report	C Riordan 0-3, A Kelly 0-1, J McGauley 0-1, J Ryan 0-1, C Riordan 0-1, G Leahy 0-1.

=== Munster final ===
7 December 2024 Final	Austin Stacks (Kerry)	7-07 - 1-02	Aherlow (Tipperary)	Mallow GAA Complex
	C Purcell 3-1; P Lane 1-2 (0-2f); S Quilter 1-1; J O’Connor, S O’Callaghan 1-0 each; D McKivergan 0-2 (2f); C Griffin 0-1.	Report	B Grogan (free), M Russell 0-1 each.	Referee: N Quinn (Clare)

== Ulster Intermediate Club Football Championship ==
=== Ulster preliminary round ===
2 November 2024 Preliminary round	Derrylaughan Kevin Barrys (Tyrone)	1-11 - 1-08	Termon (Donegal)	O'Neill's Healy Park
	T Carney 1-6, 2'45s',1 f, 1m; L Gervin, S Robinson, C Hughes, J Donnelly, C Gervin 0-1 each.	Report	P Fegan 1-0; J Grant, J Alcorn, E McCormick and JJ Sweeney 0-2 each; D McDaid 0-2, 1f.

=== Ulster quarter-finals ===
9 November 2024 Quarter-final	All Saints (Antrim)	6-12 - 3-21	Derrylaughan Kevin Barrys (Tyrone)	Cargin Grounds
	P McAleer (2-4, 1f), C Stewart (1-2), B McDonnell (1-1), S McVeigh (1-0), R McKillop (1-0), K Keenan (0-1), C Lemon (0-1), J McDonnell (0-1), S O’Callaghan (0-1), M McCarry (0-1f).	Report	T Carney (0-9, 84, 1 45), B Kennedy (2-1), J Donnelly (0-5, 1f), C Gervin (1-1), F McAliskey (0-2), C O’Hagan (0-1), L Cushnahan (0-1); D Carney (0-1).

9 November 2024 Quarter-final	Lisnaskea Emmetts (Fermanagh)	1-09 - 3-20	Magheracloone Mitchells (Monaghan)	Brewster Park
	Lynch 1-1, J McDade 0-4, E McCaffrey 0-1, D Tierney 0-1, D Óg Kelly 0-1, N Keenan 0-1.	Report	K Duffy 1-2, R Farrelly 1-1, D Farrelly 1-0, A Kieran 0-3, A McKeown 0-2, M Metzger 0-2, P Doogan-Burke 0-2, P McMahon 0-2, K Rudden 0-1, P Kirk 0-1, D McCahey 0-1, A McCagey 0-1, G Doogan 0-1.

9 November 2024 Quarter-final	Drumgath (Down)	1-12 - 1-18	Arva (Cavan)	Páirc Esler
	P Downey (1-2), S Byrne (0-4, 1f), R Hillen (0-3, 1f), P McPolin (0-2), R Byrne (0-1).	Report	K Bouchier (0-5, 4f), P Morris (1-1, 0-1m), J McCabe (0-3), C Brady (0-2), T Noack Hofmann (0-2), T Partington (0-2), B Donnelly (0-2), S Sheridan (0-1).

10 November 2024 Quarter-final	Ballinderry Shamrocks (Derry)	1-14 - 0-12	St Patrick's Carrickcruppen (Armagh)	Celtic Park
	N O'Donnell 1-2, S McCann 0-4, C Crozier 0-3, D Lawn 0-2, R Forbes 0-1, B McKinless 0-2.	Report	E Woods 0-5, C Sloan 0-2, E Kane 0-2, B Hughes 0-1, B Matthews 0-1, C O'Grady 0-1.

=== Ulster semi-finals ===
24 November 2024 Semi-final	Ballinderry Shamrocks (Derry)	0-09 - 1-05	Derrylaughan Kevin Barrys (Tyrone)	Páirc Esler
	S McCann 0-3, R Bell 0-2, N O'Donnell 0-1, R Forbes 0-1, B McKinless 0-1, C Crozier 0-1.	Report	C Gervan 1-0, T Carney 0-3, J Donnelly 0-1.

24 November 2024 Semi-final	Arva (Cavan)	2-07 - 0-11	Magheracloone Mitchells (Monaghan)	St Oliver Plunkett Park
	B Donnelly 1-0, N Hoffman 1-0, C Sheridan 0-2, K Bouchier 0-2, C Brady 0-1, P Morris 0-1, J McCabe 0-1.		A Kieran 0-8, A McKeown 0-1, P McMahon 0-1, D Byrne 0-1.

=== Ulster final ===
15 December 2024 Final	Arva (Cavan)	2-08 - 1-12	Ballinderry Shamrocks (Derry)	O'Neill's Healy Park
17:00 GMT (UTC±0)	B Donnelly, C Sheridan 1-1 each, K Bouchier 0-3 (1f), J McCabe 0-2, C Brady 0-1.	Report	S McCann 1-1, C O’Neill (1f), N O’Donnell, C Crozier (1f) 0-2 each, R Bell, D Lawn, R Forbes, S Coleman 0-1 each.

== All-Ireland Intermediate Club Football Championship ==
Semi-Finals		Final
Austin Stacks (Kerry)	0-07
Ballinderry (Derry)	0-11	Ballinderry (Derry)	0-13
Crossmolina Deel Rovers (Mayo)	1-12	Crossmolina Deel Rovers (Mayo)	1-12
Caragh (Kildare)	0-06

=== All-Ireland semi-finals ===
4 January 2025 Semi-final	Austin Stacks (Kerry)	0-07 - 0-11	Ballinderry Shamrocks (Derry)	Glenisk O'Connor Park
13:00 IWT (UTC±0)		Report

4 January 2025 Semi-final	Crossmolina Deel Rovers (Mayo)	1-12 - 0-06	Caragh (Kildare)	Glennon Brothers Pearse Park
13:00 IWT (UTC±0)		Report		Referee: Kieran Eannetta (Tyrone)

=== All-Ireland final ===
26 January 2025 Final	Ballinderry Shamrocks (Derry)	0-13 - 1-12	Crossmolina Deel Rovers (Mayo)	Croke Park
	C Crozier (2f), C O’Neill (0-2f), R Bell 0-3 each, D McKinless 0-2, R Forbes and T Rocks 0-1	Report	C Loftus 1-1, F Duffy 0-4f, N Coggins 0-3, J Maheady 0-2 (1f), K Mulhern and L Loftus 0-1 each	Referee: S Lonergan (Tipperary)

== Championship statistics ==
=== Top scorers ===
Overall

Rank	Player	Club	Tally	Total	Matches	Average
1	Darragh Swords	Caragh	1-19	22	4	5.50
2	Tomás Carney	Derrylaughan Kevin Barrys	1-18	21	3	7.00
3	Jake Corrigan	Caragh	3-11	20	3	6.66
4	Barry Grogan	Aherlow	1-14	17	3	5.66
5	Fionan Duffy	Crossmolina Deel Rovers	0-14	14	4	3.50
6	Conor Loftus	Crossmolina Deel Rovers	3-04	13	4	3.25
7	Cian Purcell	Austin Stacks	3-03	12	2	6.00
7	Eoin Whelan	Fethard St Mogue's	2-06	12	2	6.00
7	Karl Lynch-Bissett	Fethard St Mogue's	1-09	12	3	3.00
10	Shea McCann	Ballinderry Shamrocks	1-08	11	4	2.75
10	Ronan Doorey	Caragh	1-08	11	4	2.75
10	Allan Kieran	Magheracloone Mitchells	0-11	11	2	5.50
10	John Turbitt	Fethard St Mogue's	0-11	11	2	5.50
10	Conor Cosgrove	Garrycastle	0-11	11	3	3.66

In a single game

Rank	Player	Club	Tally	Total	Opposition
1	Barry Grogan	Aherlow	1-08	11	Stradbally
2	Cian Purcell	Austin Stacks	3-01	10	Aherlow
2	Eoin Whelan	Fethard St Mogue's	2-04	10	Caragh
2	Paddy McAleer	All Saints	2-04	10	Derrylaughan Kevin Barrys
5	Jake Corrigan	Caragh	2-03	9	Dicksboro
5	Darragh Swords	Caragh	1-06	9	Fethard St Mogue's
5	Tomás Carney	Derrylaughan Kevin Barrys	1-06	9	Termon
5	Tomás Carney	Derrylaughan Kevin Barrys	0-09	9	All Saints
9	Allan Kieran	Magheracloone Mitchells	0-08	8	Arva
10	Brian Kennedy	Derrylaughan Kevin Barrys	2-01	7	All Saints
10	Darragh Swords	Caragh	0-07	7	Meath Hill
10	Martin Cassidy	Fr Manning Gaels	0-07	7	Crettyard
10	John Turbitt	Fethard St Mogue's	0-07	7	Carnew Emmets
