= 2023–24 All-Ireland Intermediate Club Football Championship =

Irish Gaelic football competition

- Dates: 21 October 2023 - 14 January 2024
- Teams: 32
- Sponsor: Allied Irish Bank
- Champions: St Patrick's Cullyhanna (1st title); Pearse Casey (captain); Stephen Reel (manager)
- Runners-up: Cill na Martra; Gearóid Ó Goillidhe (captain); John Evans (manager)

Tournament statistics
- Matches played: 31
- Goals scored: 67 (2.16 per match)
- Points scored: 651 (21 per match)
- Top scorer(s): Gary Walsh (2-24)

Provincial Champions
- Munster: Cill na Martra
- Leinster: Allenwood
- Ulster: St Patrick's Cullyhanna
- Connacht: Castlerea St Kevin's

The 2023–24 All-Ireland Intermediate Club Football Championship was the 20th staging of the All-Ireland Intermediate Club Football Championship since its establishment by the Gaelic Athletic Association for the 2003–04 season. The draws for the respective provincial championships took place at various stages. The championship ran from 21 October 2023 to 14 January 2024.

The All-Ireland final was played on 14 January 2024 at Croke Park in Dublin, between St Patrick's Cullyhanna from Armagh and Cill na Martra from Cork, in what was their first ever meeting in the final. St Patrick's Cullyhanna won the match by 1-08 to 0-07 to claim their first ever All-Ireland title.

Ballylinan's Gary Walsh was the championship's top scorer with 2-24.

== Connacht Intermediate Club Football Championship ==
=== Connacht quarter-finals ===
12 November 2023 Quarter-final	Kilmeena	4-18 - 0-08	Annaduff	Hastings Insurance MacHale Park
	C Halligan 2-4, 1f, 1M; D Keaveney 0-5, 1 50, 1f; J McGlynn 0-3, 1f; J Carney & N Feehan 1-0 each; S Ryder & K Joyce 0-2 each; L Moore & D Slattery (f) 0-1 each	Report	D Cox 0-6, 5f; R Cox 0-2, 1M

=== Connacht semi-finals ===
18 November 2023 Semi-final	Castlerea St Kevin's	2-06 - 0-09	Easkey	Markievicz Park
	A McDermott 2-1, D Brennan 0-2, S Joyce 0-1, N Blighe 0-1, N Connaghton 0-1.	Report	A Kilcullen 0-4, J Scott 0-1, R Sloyan 0-1, K DUffy 0-1, R Gillespie 0-1, K Tiernan 0-1.

19 November 2023 Semi-final	Monivea Abbey	1-08 - 0-10	Kilmeena	Tuam Stadium
	G Kelly (3f) T Mullins (m) 0-4 each, P Mullins 1-0.	Report	D Keaveney 0-5f, C Halligan 0-3, J McGlynn (f) and S Ryder 0-1 each.

=== Connacht final ===
25 November 2023 Final	Castlerea St Kevin's	2-04 - 0-08	Monivea Abbey	O'Rourke Park
	N Blighe 1-0, E O'Connell 1-0, A McDermott 0-3, D McDermott 0-1.	Report	G Kelly 0-4, C Cooley 0-1, F Garvey 0-1, L Kenny 0-1, N Mannion 0-1.

== Leinster Intermediate Club Football Championship ==
=== Leinster round 1 ===
21 October 2023 Round 1	Ballylinan	1-14 - 0-07	Mullinavat	Bill Delaney Park
	G Walsh (0-9, 0-4 frees); C Fennessy (1-2); S Lacey, A Farrell, C Dunne (0-1 each).	Report	M Malone (0-3, 0-1 free); J Walsh, P Dempsey, A Mansfield, O Knox (0-1 each).

21 October 2023 Round 1	Roche Emmets	1-19 - 0-04	Ballycommon	Protection & Prosperity Darver COE
	B O’Hare (1-5, 0-1 free), S Byrne (0-5), L Dawe (0-4), M Byrne (0-2), DD Reilly, D Reilly, D O’Connell (0-1 each).	Report	G Mann (mark), S Conneely, I Scally, A Mann (0-1 each).

21 October 2023 Round 1	Rathkenny	1-14 - 0-04	Naomh Éanna	Páirc Tailteann
	K Curtis 0-9 (5f, 1m), S O’Hare 1-0, J Gore 0-3, E Heavey 0-1, J Macken 0-1.	Report	B Cushe 0-1, C Stokes 0-1; M Molloy 0-1, E McGuckin 0-1.

21 October 2023 Round 1	Clonmore	1-08 - 2-09	St Malachy's	Netwatch Cullen Park
	S McGrath 0-4, O Doyle 1-0, B Lawlor 0-1, E McGrath 0-1, A Kelly 0-1, A Byrne 0-1.	Report	N O'Brien 1-3, S Corcoran 1-2, D Lynch 0-2, A Clarke 0-1, N Kirby 0-1.

=== Leinster quarter-finals ===
4 November 2023 Quarter-final	Kenagh	1-10 - 3-11	Rathkenny	Glennon Brothers Pearse Park
	C McGann (1-0); D Carberry (0-3, 1f), S Farrell (0-2), J Kelly (0-2), T McGann (0-1), A Jones (0-1), K McGann (0-1, f).	Report	K Curtis (0-6, 1 mark, 1f), O Cummins-Fuller (1-1), A Johnson (1-0), E Heavey (1-0), J Gore (0-2), B Meade (0-1); P McKeever (0-1).

4 November 2023 Quarter-final	Roche Emmets	1-11 - 1-12	Scoil Uí Chonaill	Protection & Prosperity Darver COE
	B O’Hare (0-6) (Three ‘45s) (3f), P Lynch (1-0), DD Reilly (0-1), S Byrne (0-1), L Dawe (0-1), M Byrne (0-1); G Stewart (0-1).	Report	B Murray (1-2); E Rogan (0-3) (3f), R Kennedy (0-2), N O’Flynn (0-2), A Bunyan (0-1) (1f); R Keane (0-1), C Dixon (0-1).

4 November 2023 Quarter-final	Ballylinan	5-15 - 1-10	Barndarrig	LOETB Laois COE
	G Walsh (2-8, 4f, 1m), C Farrell (1-2); A Farrell (1-2); M Downey (1-0), P McEvoy (0-1), T Bride (0-1), C Dunne (0-1, m).	Report	M Murphy (0-7, 4f), S Leonard (1-1), M Cullen (0-2), J McCall (0-1)	Referee: .

4 November 2023 Quarter-final	Allenwood	1-17 - 1-14	St Malachy's	Manguard Park Kildare COE Hawkfield
	E Bagnall 0-9 (7f), J Doyle 0-4 (2f; 1 ‘45’), J O’Brien 1-0, D Judge 0-2 (2f), D Malone and C Denagher 0-1 each.	Report	D Ruane 0-5 (3f), N McKenna 1-0, A Mangan 0-3 (3f), N O’Brien and S Corcoran 0-2 each, M Gavigan and N Kirby 0-1 each.

=== Leinster semi-finals ===
18 November 2023 Semi-final	Ballylinan	1-09 - 2-17 (aet)	Allenwood	Laois Hire O'Moore Park
	G Walsh 0-7 (5 frees, 45, mark), J Farrell 1-0, R Brady 0-1, M Downey 0-1.	Report	J O'Brien 1-2, R Moran 1-1, E Bagnall 0-3 (2 frees), D Malone 0-3, J Doyle 0-2 (45), J Byrne 0-2, A Dunne 0-1 (free), B Maher 0-1, D Judge 0-1 (free), C Denagher 0-1.

18 November 2023 Semi-final	Rathkenny	1-14 - 2-11 (aet); Penalties: 2-3	Scoil Uí Chonaill	Páirc Tailteann
	K Curtis 0-6 one mark, two frees; E Heavey 1-0; D Curtis 0-3 two frees; A Johnson 0-2; J O'Hare 0-1; C Jenkinson 0-1; B Meade 0-1.	Report	E Rogan 0-5 frees; B Murray 1-1; B O'Connell 1-0; N O'Flynn 0-1; A Bunyan 0-1 free; R Kennedy 0-1; C Coady 0-1; C Dixon 0-1.

=== Leinster final ===
2 December 2023 Final	Scoil Uí Chonaill	3-05 - 4-12	Allenwood	Parnell Park
	K Cagney and E Rogan (1 free) 1-1 each, C Geraghty 1-0, B Murray, R Kennedy and A Bunyan (1 free) 0-1 each.	Report	E Bagnall 1-5 (2 frees), A Dunne 1-2 (2 frees), Billy Maher 1-1, M Delaney 1-0, D Malone 0-2, J Doyle and J Byrne 0-1 each.

== Munster Intermediate Club Football Championship ==
=== Munster quarter-finals ===
12 November 2023 Quarter-final	Cill na Martra	1-17 - 0-07	Kilmihil	Páirc Uí Chuana
	D Ó Duinnín (0-9, 0-3 frees), C Ó Duinnín (1-0), M Ó Deasúna (0-3, 0-2 frees), D Ó hUrdail (0-2, 0-1 free). F Ó Faoláin, S Ó Duinnín, C Ó Meachair (0-1 each).	Report	C Downes (0-4, 0-2 frees), D Lernihan, M O’Leary and S Downes (0-1 each).	Referee: S Mulvihill (Kerry)

12 November 2023 Quarter-final	Grangemockler/Ballyneale	0-16 - 3-10	Roanmore	Canon Hayes Park
	M Lyons 0-6 (4 frees, 1 mark), M McFadden 0-4; M O’Meara 0-3; J Lyons 0-2; S O’Meara 0-1;	Report	S Pender 1-1, B Nolan 1-1; S Mackey 1-0; E Nolan 0-3 (1 free); D Reidy 0-2; P O’Sullivan 0-1; G O’Brien 0-1; B Nolan 0-1.

=== Munster semi-finals ===
26 November 2023 Semi-final	Cill na Martra	0-13 - 0-10	Milltown/Castlemaine	Páirc Uí Chuana
	D Ó hUrdail (0-2 frees) and M Ó Duinnín (0-3 each), M Ó Deasúna (0-1 45) and S Ó Fóirréidh (0-2 each), C Ó Fóirréidh, D Ó Conaill and T Ó Corcora (0-1 each).	Report	É O’Connor (frees) and C Moriarty (0-3 each), G Hora, B Casey, C Burke and C Spillane (0-1 each).

26 November 2023 Semi-final	Roanmore	0-02 - 1-09	Mungret/St Paul's	Walsh Park
	D Reidy and E Nolan (1 mark) 0-1 each.	Report	E Ryan 1-1, B Barry 0-4 (1 mark), J McCarthy, B Giltenane, Di Hynes and D Bridgeman 0-1 each.

=== Munster final ===
10 December 2023 Final	Cill na Martra	3-12 - 0-10	Mungret/St Paul's	Mallow GAA Complex
	D Ó Duinnín (2-2), M Ó Duinnín (1-2), M Ó Deasúna (0-4, 0-1 free, 0-1 ’45), D Ó hUrdail (0-2), S Ó Fórréidh and C Ó Duinnín (0-1 each).	Report	J Hutton (0-4, 0-3 frees), B Giltiinane, S Barry, D O’Hagan, L Harrington and D Hynes (0-1 each).	Referee: B Griffin (Kerry)

== Ulster Intermediate Club Football Championship ==
=== Ulster preliminary round ===
5 November 2023 Preliminary round	Teemore Shamrocks	0-04 - 3-06	Liatroim Fontenoys	Brewster Park
	E McManus (0-4, 03 frees).	Report	C McCrickard (2-2), E McCrickard (1-0), P Og McCrickard (0-2), R O’Hare (0-1); PJ Davidson (0-1).

=== Ulster quarter-finals ===
11 November 2023 Quarter-final	Pomeroy Plunketts	0-10 - 0-11	St Patrick's Cullyhanna	O'Neill's Healy Park
	R Duffin 0-5 (3f), K McGeary 0-3, B Burns 0-1, H McNamee 0-1 (1m).	Report	A Nugent 0-7 (7f), K McCooey 0-1, T Donnelly 0-1, P Casey 0-1, R McQuillan 0-1.

12 November 2023 Quarter-final	Glenullin	3-13 - 0-07	Con Magees Glenravel	Celtic Park
	E Bradley (1-7, 4f), E McIlvar (1-0), T Bradley (1-0), D O’Kane (0-3); N McNicholl (0-2); C Hasson (0-1).	Report	E Fyfe (0-3, 1f), C McKeown (0-2), R McQuillan (0-1f); C Higgins (0-1).

12 November 2023 Quarter-final	Liatroim Fontenoys	0-09 - 0-07	Killanny	Páirc Esler
	P Óg McCrickard 0-5, 4 frees, C McCrickard 0-2, 1 free, C Kelly-McEvoy 0-1, E McCrickard 0-1.	Report	E Walsh 0-5, 4 frees, C Leegan 0-1 free, R Grimes 0-1.

12 November 2023 Quarter-final	Ballyhaise	4-15 - 0-11	Downings	Kingspan Breffni Park
	P Moore (2-1), K Tierney (1-2, 1-0, pen), M Brady (0-5, 0-4 frees), D Brady (0-4), A Heaslip (1-0), E Clarke (0-1); C Clarke (0-1); M Conaty (0-1).	Report	P McElwee (0-5 frees), J McGroddy (0-3, 0-2 frees), L Connor (0-1), O Boyce (0-1), K McGroddy (0-1).

=== Ulster semi-finals ===
25 November 2023 Semi-final	Glenullin	1-13 - 1-14	Ballyhaise	O'Neill's Healy Park
	E Bradley (1-7, 4f), D O'Kane (0-3), T Bradley (0-1), R McNicholl (0-1), C Hasson (0-1).	Report	M Brady (0-7, 4f), D Brady (1-2), B O'Rourke (0-2), K Tierney (0-2), C McKieran (0-1).

26 November 2023 Semi-final	St Patrick's Cullyhanna	0-17 - 0-06	Liatroim Fontenoys	St Mary's Park
	A Nugent 0-8 (3f), T Donnelly 0-2, S Hoey 0-2, R McQuillan 0-2, G Duffy 0-2, J Duffy 0-1.	Report	C McCrickard 0-3 (1m), E McCrickard 0-1, PJ Davidson 0-1, P Og McCrickard 0-1.

=== Ulster final ===
9 December 2023 Final	Ballyhaise	0-12 - 1-10	St Patrick's Cullyhanna	St Tiernach's Park
	M Brady (0-4, 0-2 marks, 0-2 frees), M Conaty (0-2), D Brady (0-2), E Clarke (0-2), B O’Rourke (0-1); P Moore (0-1).	Report	C Reavey (1-2), R McQuillan (0-3); A Nugent (0-2 frees), S Hoey (0-1), P Casey (0-1), J Duffy (0-1).	Referee: D Boylan (Monaghan)

== All-Ireland Intermediate Club Football Championship ==
=== All-Ireland semi-finals ===
6 January 2024 Semi-final	Cill na Martra	2-10 - 0-15	Castlerea St Kevin's	Laois Hire O'Moore Park
	M Ó Deasúna (1-3, 0-3 frees); D Ó Duinnín (1-1); D Ó hUrdail (0-2); C Mac Lochlainn, T Ó Corcora, M Ó Duinnín, S Ó Duinnín (0-1 each).	Report	Adam McDermott (0-6, 0-5 frees), D McDermott (0-6, 0-4 frees); S Keenan (0-2); P Joyce (0-1).	Referee: B Cawley

6 January 2024 Semi-final	Allenwood	0-11 - 1-11	St Patrick's Cullyhanna	Páirc Tailteann
	E Bagnell (0-4, 2fs), C Denagher (0-3, 1f), J Doyle (0-2), D Malone, B Maher (0-1 each).	Report	A Nugent (0-5, 3fs), R McQuillan (1-1), C Reavey, S Connell, G Duffy, B McConville, S Hoey (0-1 each).	Referee: J Molloy (Galway)

=== Final ===
14 January 2024 Final	Cill na Martra	0-07 - 1-08	St Patrick's Cullyhanna	Croke Park
	C Mac Lochlainn (0-3); C Ó Duinnín (0-2); A Ó Cuana, D Ó Duinnín (0-1 each).	Report	A Nugent (1-3, 0-2 frees); G Duffy, P Casey, S Hoey, J Mackin, J Duffy (0-1 each).	Referee: L Devenney (Mayo)

== Championship statistics ==
=== Top scorers ===
Overall

Rank	Player	Club	Tally	Total	Matches	Average
1	Gary Walsh	Ballylinan	2-24	30	3	10.00
2	Aidan Nugent	St Patrick's Cullyhanna	1-25	28	5	5.60
3	Eoin Bagnall	Allenwood	1-21	24	4	6.00
4	Dan Ó Duinnín	Cill na Martra	3-13	22	5	5.40
5	Keith Curtis	Rathkenny	0-21	21	3	7.00
6	Eoin Bradley	Glenullin	2-14	20	2	10.00
7	Adam McDermott	Castlerea St Kevin's	2-10	16	3	5.33
7	Michael Brady	Ballyhaise	0-16	16	3	5.33
9	Mícheál Ó Deasúna	Cill na Martra	1-12	15	5	3.00
10	Barry O'Hare	Roche Emmets	1-11	14	2	7.00

In a single game

Rank	Player	Club	Tally	Total	Opposition
1	Gary Walsh	Ballylinan	2-08	14	Barndarrig
2	Caolach Halligan	Kilmeena	2-04	10	Annaduff
2	Eoin Bradley	Glenullin	1-07	10	Con Magees Glenravel
2	Eoin Bradley	Glenullin	1-07	10	Ballyhaise
5	Gary Walsh	Ballylinan	0-09	9	Mullinavat
5	Keith Curtis	Rathkenny	0-09	9	Naomh Éanna
5	Eoin Bagnall	Allenwood	0-09	9	St Malachy's
5	Dan Ó Duinnín	Cill na Martra	0-09	9	Kilmihill
9	Conor McCrickard	Liatroim Fontenoys	2-02	8	Teemore Shamrocks
9	Dan Ó Duinnín	Cill na Martra	2-02	8	Mungret/St Paul's
9	Eoin Bagnall	Allenwood	1-05	8	Scoil Uí Chonaill
9	Barry O'Hare	Roche Emmets	1-05	8	Ballycommon
9	Aidan Nugent	St Patrick's Cullyhanna	0-08	8	Liatroim Fontenoys
