= 2005–06 All-Ireland Intermediate Club Football Championship =

Irish Gaelic football competition

- Sponsor: Allied Irish Bank
- Champions: Inniskeen Grattans (1st title)
- Runners-up: Caherlistrane

The 2005–06 All-Ireland Intermediate Club Football Championship was the third staging of the All-Ireland Intermediate Club Football Championship since its establishment by the Gaelic Athletic Association for the 2003–04 season.

The All-Ireland final was played on 19 February 2006 at Croke Park in Dublin, between Inniskeen Grattans and Caherlistrane. Inniskeen Grattans won the match by 2–10 to 1–11 to claim their first ever championship title.

== All-Ireland Intermediate Club Football Championship ==
=== All-Ireland semi-finals ===
29 January 2006 Semi-final	Inniskeen Grattans	0-12 - 0-09	Carbery Rangers	O'Moore Park

29 January 2006 Semi-final	Caherlistrane	4-16 - 0-03	Crettyard	St Loman's Park

=== All-Ireland final ===
19 February 2006 Final	Inniskeen Grattans	2-10 - 1-11	Caherlistrane	Croke Park
