= Niall Ronan =

Irish rugby union player

- Born: 14 September 1982 (age 44) Pilltown, County Meath, Ireland
- Height: 1.85 m (6 ft 1 in)
- Weight: 113 kg (17.8 st; 249 lb)
- School: Scoil Aonghusa, Drogheda; St. Mary's Diocesan School, Drogheda

Rugby union career
- Position: Flanker
Amateur team(s)
| Years | Team | Apps | (Points) |
- Delvin RFC
| – | Boyne RFC | | |
| – | Shannon | | |
Senior career
| Years | Team | Apps | (Points) |
| 2003–2007 | Leinster | 37 | (35) |
| 2007–2014 | Munster | 101 | (80) |
- Correct as of 13 October 2013
International career
| Years | Team | Apps | (Points) |
| 2008–2010 | Ireland A | 6 | (0) |
| 2009–2011 | Ireland | 4 | (0) |
- Correct as of 7 August 2011

Niall Ronan (born 14 September 1982) is a retired Irish rugby union player, who played for Leinster, Munster and Ireland during his career. He played as a flanker.

== Early years ==
Ronan grew up playing Gaelic football and represented the Meath county team in the All-Ireland Minor Championship. He won the Senior Schools Leinster Championships in 2000 with St. Mary's, Drogheda.

== Leinster ==
Switching from football to rugby, he played at underage level for Leinster and Ireland, and spent four seasons with Leinster.

== Munster ==
Ronan moved to Munster in 2007, and made his debut against Scarlets in September of that year. He was in the Munster team that beat Leinster to win the 2011 Magners League Grand Final.

A knee injury sustained in Munster's Heineken Cup Round 5 clash with Castres Olympique ruled Ronan out for the rest of the 2011–12 season. He signed a new two-year contract with Munster in March 2012.

Ronan earned his 100th cap for Munster on 3 May 2013, coming on against Zebre in a Pro12 fixture. On 30 April 2014, it was announced that Ronan was retiring from rugby due to a knee injury sustained in October 2013.

== Ireland ==
Ronan made his debut for Ireland against Canada on 23 May 2009, starting and finishing the match in a 25–6 win. He earned his second cap a week later against the USA. He was called up to the squad for the 2010 Summer Tour as a replacement for Kevin McLaughlin and played against the Barbarians, New Zealand Māori and Australia.

Ronan also played for Ireland against Scotland in a 2011 Rugby World Cup warm-up on 6 August 2011.

== Post-rugby career ==
After retiring, Ronan returned to play Gaelic football with his local club St. Colmcille's, winning the Meath and Leinster intermediate championships in 2016 and reaching the final of the All-Ireland Intermediate Club Football Championship in 2017.

In 2019, Ronan joined Meath as a strength and conditioning coach.

In February 2022, Ronan became manager of Louth club O'Raghallaighs, winning promotion from Division 2.

Ronan was appointed manager of St. Colmcille's in November 2023.
