= 2025–26 All-Ireland Intermediate Club Football Championship =

Irish Gaelic football competition

- Dates: 1 November 2025 – 11 January 2026
- Teams: 32
- Sponsor: Allied Irish Bank
- Champions: An Ghaeltacht (1st title); PJ Mac Láimh (captain); Fergal Ó Sé (manager)
- Runners-up: Glenullin; Daniel O'Kane (captain); Traglach Bradley (captain); Michael O'Kane (manager)

Tournament statistics
- Matches played: 31
- Goals scored: 83 (2.68 per match)
- Points scored: 835 (26.94 per match)
- Top scorer: Ryan McNicholl (6–12)

Provincial Champions
- Munster: An Ghaeltacht
- Leinster: Sallins
- Ulster: Glenullin
- Connacht: Strokestown

The 2025–26 All-Ireland Intermediate Club Football Championship was the 22nd staging of the All-Ireland Intermediate Club Football Championship since its establishment by the Gaelic Athletic Association for the 2003–04 season. The championship is scheduled to run from 1 November 2024 to 11 January 2026.

The All-Ireland final was played at Croke Park in Dublin on 11 January 2026, between An Ghaeltacht of Kerry and Glenullin of Derry, in what was a first championship meeting between the teams. An Ghaeltacht won the match by 0–12 to 0–06.

Glenullin's Ryan McNicholl was the championship's top scorer with 6–12.

== Connacht Intermediate Club Football Championship ==
The draw for the Connacht Club Championship took place on 18 December 2024.

=== Connacht quarter-final ===
9 November 2025 Quarter-final	Caltra (Galway)	0-21 - 1-21 (aet)	Kilmeena (Mayo)	Tuam Stadium
	Alan Naughton 0-17 (3 tpf, 8f), M Mulryan and K Murray 0-2 each.	Report	J McGlynn 0-6 (2f), J Mulchrone 1-2, C O’Malley 0-4, L Moore 0-3, J Carney and D Slattery 0-2 each, K Ryder and R O’Donnell 0-1 each.

=== Connacht semi-finals ===
16 November 2025 Semi-final	Kilmeena (Mayo)	0-22 - 1-09	Coolaney/Mullinabreena (Sligo)	Hastings Insurance MacHale Park
	D Keaveney (0-5, 1f), J McGlynn (0-4, 2f), L Moore (0-4), J Mulchrone (0-2); D Slattery (0-2), C Hastings (0-1), S Staunton (0-1), J Carney (0-1), D Kelly (0-1), B Durkan (0-1).	Report	C Davey (1-1), G Gorman (0-2, 1f), B Gorman (0-2, 1f), N Connolly (0-1); C Gorman (0-1f), E Barrett (0-1), D Barrett (0-1).

16 November 2025 Semi-final	Strokestown (Roscommon)	2-16 - 0-16	Allen Gaels (Leitrim)	King & Moffatt Dr Hyde Park
	D McGann 1-7 (three frees, one 0-2 free), S McGinley 0-3, M Kavanagh 1-0, K Finn 0-2 (two frees), S McDonnell 0-2 (one 0-2), C Neary 0-1, K Murphy 0-1.	Report	K Kilcline 0-5 (one 0-2 free, two frees), C McMorrow 0-4 (one mark, one free), C Duffy 0-3 (one 0-2), R Oberwan 0-2 (one 0-2), C Walsh 0-2 (one 0-2).

=== Connacht final ===
23 November 2025 Final	Kilmeena (Mayo)	0-14 - 4-11	Strokestown (Roscommon)	Hastings Insurance MacHale Park
	J McGlynn (0-3, frees), L Moore (0-2), S Staunton (0-2, 2p), C Kelly (0-1), B Durkan (0-1), P Groden (0-1, ’45); J Ryan (0-1); C Hastings (0-1), J Carney (0-1), D Slattery (0-1).	Report	S McGinley (1-3, 1 2p); S Tighe (1-1), C Compton (1-0); E Moran (1-0), M Kavanagh (0-2), K Finn (0-2, frees), D McGann (0-2, 1 free), K Murphy (0-1).

== Leinster Intermediate Club Football Championship ==
Details about the Leinster Club Championship draw.

=== Leinster first round ===
1 November 2025 First round	Sallins (Kildare)	5-21 - 0-07	Grange (Carlow)	Cedral St Conleth's Park
	S Kelly 3-1, E Ralph 1-2, J Dalton 1-2, C Dalton 0-5, C Grimes 0-3 (2fs), A Marshall 0-3, L Killian 0-2; R Ó Domhnaill 0-1, D Mangan 0-1, S McDonnell 0-1 (f).	Report	P Hickey 0-3 (1tp); J Murphy 0-2 (tpf), N Pender 0-1, J Byrne 0-1.

1 November 2025 First round	Hunterstown Rovers (Louth)	4-17 - 2-07	Hollywood (Wicklow)	Páirc Parnel Tigh Beannáin
	R Ward (2-2, 1tp), R Burns (0-8, 3f 2tp), D Carroll (1-1), C Taaffe (1-0), C Russell (0-3), M Reid (0-1), J Rogers (0-1).	Report	D Peppard (1-4, 2tp), R Mulvey (1-0), M Kelly (0-2, 2f), J Corrigan (0-1).

1 November 2025 First round	Ardagh Moydow (Longford)	2-08 - 2-19	Kilbride (Meath)	Glennon Brothers Pearse Park
	K Farrell (0-7 five frees), C Hogan (1-0); D Fay (1-0), D Coady (0-1).	Report	C McWeeney (2-2), D O'Leary (0-7 three frees, one two-point free), J Harford (0-6 one two-pointer, one free, one two-point free), A McWeeney (0-2 two-pointer); D Boyd (0-1), C McKenna (0-1).

2 November 2025 First round	Tubberclair (Westmeath)	3-17 - 2-09	Mullinavat (Kilkenny)	Breedon Kevin Molloy Park
	M Whittaker 1-5; E McCabe 0-7 (2tp, 3f); F Kelleher, D O’Connor 1-2 each; T Kelleher 0-1.	Report	G Malone 1-1; J Culleton 1-0 (pen); M Malone 0-3; I Duggan 0-2; C Duggan, L Fennelly, P Dempsey 0-1 each.

=== Leinster quarter-finals ===
15 November 2025 Quarter-final	Kilbride (Meath)	0-06 - 3-18	Sallins (Kildare)	Páirc Tailteann
	David O'Leary 0-3 (0-3 frees), Josh Harford 0-1, Caolan Howard 0-1, Conor McWeeney 0-1.	Report	C Grimes 1-4 (0-3 frees, one two-point free), C Dalton 1-3, S Kelly 0-4 (0-3 frees, one two-point free), L Kelly 1-0, A Marshall 0-2, L Killian 0-1, E Ralph 0-1, J Dalton 0-1, G McEvoy 0-1, S Conway 0-1.

15 November 2025 Quarter-final	Clara (Offaly)	0-18 - 0-16	Round Towers (Dublin)	Glenisk O'Connor Park
	J Fleming 0-5 (1 P2, 1f); C Delaney 0-4 (1 P2, 1f); T Deehan 0-3; M Dalton, C Doyle 0-2 each; C Egan, G Guilfoyle 0-1 apiece.	Report	L Bohan 0-8 (3f, 1 F2, 1 ’45’); C Howley, E Ferguson 0-2 each; L White, S Bollard, D Kelly, A Burns 0-1 apiece.

15 November 2025 Quarter-final	Hunterstown Rovers (Louth)	0-11 - 0-06	Park–Ratheniska (Laois)	Páirc Parnel Tigh Beannáin
	R Burns 0-8 (0-4 frees, one two-point free), R Ward, D Finn and M Ward 0-1 each.	Report	J Connolly 0-4 (0-3 frees), K Delaney and N Fingleton 0-1 each.

15 November 2025 Quarter-final	Tubberclair (Westmeath)	2-27 - 0-01	St Martin's (Wexford)	St Loman's Park
	K Connell 2-2, F Kelleher 0-6 (1f, 2 2pt), F Duffy 0-5 (3f), J Madden 0-3, M Whittaker, D O’Connor, E McCabe (frees) and O O’Meara 0-2 each, P Keegan, C Elliott and S Claffey 0-1 each.	Report	C Coleman 0-1.

=== Leinster semi-finals ===
29 November 2025 Semi-final	Hunterstown Rovers (Louth)	4-12 - 4-16	Tubberclair (Westmeath)	Páirc Parnel Tigh Beannáin
	R Burns (1-9), M Ward (1-0), C Russell (1-0), C Taaffe (1-0), D Finn (0-1), R Ward (0-1), P Carrie (0-1).	Report	F Kelleher (3-1, 2-0 pens), E McCabe (0-7); M Whittaker (1-2), T Kelleher (0-2), D O'Connor (0-2), K Connell (0-1), O O'Meara (0-1).

30 November 2025 Semi-final	Sallins (Kildare)	2-18 - 1-12	Clara (Offaly)	Cedral St Conleth's Park
	J Dalton 1-2, S Kelly 1-2 (1f), C Grimes 0-5 (4fs), C Dalton 0-4, L Killian 0-2; L Kelly 0-1, E McConnon 0-1, S McDonnell 0-1.	Report	Ed Cullen 1-0, J Fleming 0-3 (1tpf, 1f), C Doyle 0-2 (tp), C Delaney 0-2 (1’45), T Deehan 0-2, M Dalton 0-1, C Stewart 0-1; J Reynolds 0-1.

=== Leinster final ===
14 December 2025 Final	Sallins (Kildare)	2-11 - 2-04	Tubberclair (Westmeath)	Cedral St Conleth's Park
	C Grimes 1-7 (1 tp, 1 tpf, 3f), J Dalton 1-0, E Ralph 0-2 (1 tp), S Kelly 0-1 (0-1f), G McEvoy 0-1.	Report	M Whittaker 1-2, D O'Connor 1-0, P Keegan 0-1, E McCabe 0-1.

== Munster Intermediate Club Football Championship ==
The draw for the Munster Club Championship took place on 31 July 2025.

=== Munster quarter-finals ===
9 November 2025 Quarter-final	Thurles Sarsfields (Tipperary)	0-15 - 0-20	Aghabullogue (Cork)	Templetuohy Grounds
	L McCormack 0-6 (0-4 f, 1 2pt f), P Creedon 0-4 (2 2pt), C Stakelum 0-3, A Ryan, M Kelly 0-1 each.	Report	A O’Sullivan (1 2pt), M Bradley (0-1 f, 0-1 45) 0-4 each, L Casey (0-1 f), P O’Sullivan 0-3 each, J Corkery, C Gillespie 0-2 each, E O’Sullivan (f), P Ring 0-1 each.

9 November 2025 Quarter-final	Corofin (Clare)	1-14 - 0-10	Stradbally (Waterford)	Páirc Finne
	G Cahill 0-5 (3f), S Kirby 1-0, C McGroary 0-3 (1f), J Ryan 0-2, C Flanagan, D Cahill, K Keane, G Kelly 0-1 each.	Report	P Skehan (1f), M O’Brien (1f 1 tp) 0-4 each, J Mullaney, M Mullaney 0-1 each.

=== Munster semi-finals ===
23 November 2025 Semi-final	Corofin (Clare)	0-11 - 1-13	An Ghaeltacht (Kerry)	Páirc Finne
	G Cahill (0-5, 1f), C McGroary (0-5, 2tpf, 1f), J Malone (0-1).	Report	T Ó Sé (1-2), É Ó Conchúir (0-4, 2f), B Ó Beaglaoich (0-3, 1 2pt), G Ó Cinnéide (0-2), PJ Mac Láimh, D Ó Beaglaoich (0-1 each).

23 November 2025 Semi-final	Aghabullogue (Cork)	0-14 - 0-10	Askeaton-Ballysteen-Kilcornan (Limerick)	SuperValu Páirc Uí Chaoimh
	M Bradley (0-9, 1tpf, 1 free, 1 45); C Gillespie, J Corkery, E O’Sullivan, L Casey, D Thompson (free) (0-1 each).	Report	J Rushe (0-5, 5 frees); D Neville (0-3); J Dolan (45), P Murphy (0-1 each).

=== Final ===
6 December 2025 Final	An Ghaeltacht (Kerry)	2-12 - 1-08	Aghabullogue (Cork)	Mick Neville Park
	Ruaidhrí Ó Beaglaoich, É Ó Conchúir 1-1 each, C Ó Beaglaoich 0-4 (1 2pt, 0-1 45), G Ó Cinnéide 0-3 (1 2pt, 0-1 f), C Ó Corrduibh, P Ó Sé, T Ó Sé 0-1 each.	Report	J Corkery 0-4 (2 2pt), M Bradley 1-1, A Murphy 0-2 (1 2pt), A O’Sullivan 0-1.

== Ulster Intermediate Club Football Championship ==
Details about the Ulster Club Championship draw.

=== Ulster preliminary round ===
1 November 2025 Preliminary round	Glenullin (Derry)	2-17 - 0-06	Naomh Eargnait, Muine Glás (Antirm)	Owenbeg Centre of Excellence
	D O'Kane 1-4 (3f), R McNicholl 1-2 (1f), N McNicholl 0-6 (2tp), C Bradley 0-1, C Hasson 0-2, E Bradley 0-2 (1f).	Report	C Duffin 0-1 (1f), T Cassidy 0-1, S Boyd 0-1, C McCann 0-2, R Campbell 0-1.

=== Ulster quarter-finals ===
8 November 2025 Quarter-final	Carrickmacross Emmets (Monaghan)	1-22 - 0-09	Naomh Columba (Donegal)	Grattan Park
	A Lynch 0-8f; S O'Hanlon 0-6; D Swinburne 1-2; J Maguire 0-2,1f; F Cassidy 0-2; K McMenamin, D Lynch 0-1 each.	Report	K McNern, A Doherty (tp) 0-2 each; P Byrne (45), E Carr, P Hegarty, L Molloy, S Callaghan 0-1 each.

8 November 2025 Quarter-final	Cuchulainn (Cavan)	2-18 - 1-18	Irvinestown St Molaise (Fermanagh)	Kingspan Breffni
	N Magee 1-2, B Magee 0-5, A O'Reilly 1-1, T Farrelly 0-3, N Carolan 0-2, R Tobin 0-1, A Taite 0-1, E Doughty 0-1, M Gilsenan 0-1.	Report	G Maguire 0-6, J Largo-Ellis 0-5, C O'Hanlon 1-0, M McDermott 0-2, J Hanna 0-2, S Mulligan 0-2, O Swift 0-1.

8 November 2025 Quarter-final	Clonoe O'Rahilly's (Tyrone)	1-18 - 0-12	Saval (Down)	O'Neill's Healy Park
	C MxAliskey 0-6, S Coney 1-0, T Taggart 0-3, R Quinn 0-3, F McClure 0-2, E Mansell 0-1, D McClure 0-1, PJ Lavery 0-1, R McCabe 0-1.	Report	P Havern 0-4, D McCarthy 0-3, D McKernan 0-3, B Tumilty 0-1.

9 November 2025 Quarter-final	Sarsfields (Armagh)	2-08 - 4-16	Glenullin (Derry)	BOX-IT Athletic Grounds
	Paul McCaughey 1-0, Conal McCann 1-0, Callum McKibbon 0-2 (1f), Eamon McGeown 0-2, (1f), Paul McGeown 0-1 (1f), Michael Stevenson 0-2, Kevin McAlinden 0-1.	Report	R McNicholl 2-1, C Mullan 1-7 (1tp, 1f), C Hasson 1-0, D O'Kane 0-3 (2f), D McNicholl 0-1, C Bradley 0-1, E Bradley 0-3 (2f).

=== Ulster semi-finals ===
22 November 2025 Semi-final	Clonoe O'Rahilly's (Tyrone)	1-13 - 2-11	Cuchulainn (Cavan)	BOX-IT Athletic Grounds
	C McAliskey (1-7), R Donnelly (0-2), R McCabe (0-2); D McNulty (0-1), S Coney (0-1).	Report	E Doughty (1-1f), B Magee (0-4, 1f), A Taite (1-0); T Farrelly (0-2), N Magee (0-1), R Lennon (0-1’45); C Doughty (0-1), P Smyth (0-1).

23 November 2025 Semi-final	Carrickmacross Emmets (Monaghan)	2-13 - 1-17 (aet)	Glenullin (Derry)	O'Neill's Healy Park
	D Swinburne 1-0 (1pen), D Mee 1-0, S O'Hanlon 0-2, N Loughman 0-2, A Lynch 0-3, J Maguire 0-2, (1f), G McEnaney 0-1, F Cassidy 0-2, F Carolan 0-1.	Report	R McNicholl 0-6 (1tp), N McNicholl 1-2, C Mullan 0-2 (2f), D O'Kane 0-2 (2f), E Bradley 0-3, F Close 0-1, C Rafferty 0-1.

=== Ulster final ===
7 December 2025 Final	Cuchulainn (Cavan)	0-19 - 3-15	Glenullin (Derry)	St Tiernach's Park
	A O'Reilly 0-7 (2tp), B Magee 0-3 (1tpf), E Doughty 0-3, N Magee 0-2, M Gilsenan 0-1, N Carolan 0-1, T Farrelly 0-1, R Tobin 0-1.	Report	N McNicholl 1-5 (1tp), E Bradley 1-3 (2f), R McNicholl 1-2, D O'Kane 0-2 (2f), C Mullan 0-1 (1f), F Close 0-1, C Dempsey 0-1.

== All-Ireland Intermediate Club Football Championship ==
=== All-Ireland semi-finals ===
3 January 2026 Semi-final	Glenullin (Derry)	5-08 - 2-08	Strokestown (Roscommon)	Fr Tierney Park
	R McNicholl 2-1, J McNicholl, T Bradley, WJ Bradley 1-0 each, E Bradley, Dermot O’Kane (1f) 0-2 each, F Close, N McNicholl and C Bradley 0-1 each.	Report	D McGann 1-3 (1f), S McGinley 1-1 (1 45), D Neary, C Regan, K Finn and C Corcoran 0-1 each.

3 January 2026 Semi-final	An Ghaeltacht (Kerry)	0-18 - 1-14 (aet)	Sallins (Kildare)	SuperValu Páirc Uí Chaoimh
	R Ó Beaglaoich (0-8, tp free, 0-2 frees); É Ó Conchúir (0-4, tp free); A Breathnach (0-2, tp); A Ó Beaglaoich, PJ Mac Láimh, T Ó Sé (BB), S Ó Gairbhí (0-1 each).	Report	L Killian (0-5); L Kelly, J Dalton (0-3 each); S Kelly (1-0); C Grimes (0-2, 0-2 frees); P Farrelly (0-1).

=== All-Ireland final ===
11 January 2026 Final	An Ghaeltacht (Kerry)	0-12 - 0-06	Glenullin (Derry)	Croke Park
	R Ó Beaglaoich (0-6, tp free, 0-2 free); C Ó Beaglaoich (0-2, tp); S Ó Cuinn, É Ó Conchúir, S Ó Gairbhí, C Ó Corrduibh (0-1 each).	Report	N McNicholl (0-2 frees), C Rafferty (0-2 each); C Dempsey, F Close (0-1 each).	Referee: F Kelly (Longford)

== Championship statistics ==
=== Top scorers ===
Rank	Player	Club	Tally	Total	Matches	Average
1	Ryan McNicholl	Glenullin	6-12	30	6	5.00
2	Ryan Burns	Hunterstown Rovers	1-25	28	3	9.33
3	Cian Grimes	Sallins	2-21	27	5	5.40
4	Stephen Kelly	Sallins	5-08	23	5	4.60
5	Neil McNicholl	Glenullin	2-16	22	6	3.66
6	Fred Kelleher	Tubberclair	4-09	21	4	5.25
7	Matthew Whittaker	Tubberclair	3-11	20	3	5.00
8	Diarmuid McGann	Strokestown	2-12	18	3	6.00
8	Ruaidhrí Ó Beaglaoich	An Ghaeltacht	1-15	18	3	6.00
10	Matthew Bradley	Aghabullogue	1-14	17	3	5.66
10	Eoghan McCabe	Tubberclair	0-17	17	4	4.25
