= 2026–27 All-Ireland Intermediate Club Football Championship =

Gaelic football competition

- Dates: 30 October – 9/10 January 2027
- Teams: 32
- Sponsor: Allied Irish Bank

Provincial Champions

The 2026–27 All-Ireland Intermediate Club Football Championship is the 23rd staging of the All-Ireland Intermediate Club Football Championship since its establishment by the Gaelic Athletic Association for the 2003–04 season. The championship is scheduled to run from 30 October 2026 to 9/10 January 2027.

== Connacht Intermediate Club Football Championship ==
=== Teams ===
Team	County	Most recent success (Intermediate)		
Team	County	All-Ireland	Provincial	County
Annaduff	Leitrim	—	—	2023
Caherlistrane	Galway	—	2005	2005
Curry	Sligo	—	—	2020
Davitts	Mayo	—	2011	2011
Éire Óg	Roscommon	—	—	1993

Quarter-finals
Davitts (Mayo)	1-11
Caherlistrane (Galway)	2-18

Semi-finals
Caherlistrane (Galway)
Éire Óg (Roscommon)
Curry (Sligo)
Annaduff (Leitrim)

Final
Semi-final Winner
Semi-final Winner

=== Quarter-finals ===
8 November 2026 Quarter-final	Davitts (Mayo)	1-11 (14) – (24) 2-18	Caherlistrane (Galway)	Castlebar
15:30 GMT (UTC+0)				Venue: MacHale Park

=== Semi-finals ===
22 November 2026 Semi-final	Curry (Sligo)	v	Annaduff (Leitrim)	Sligo
13:30 GMT (UTC+0)				Venue: Markievicz Park

22 November 2026 Semi-final	Éire Óg (Roscommon)	v	Caherlistrane (Galway)	Roscommon
13:30 GMT (UTC+0)				Venue: Dr Hyde Park

=== Final ===
28 November 2026 Final	SF1 Winner (Connacht)	v	SF2 Winner (Connacht)

== Leinster Intermediate Club Football Championship ==
=== Teams ===
Team	County	Most recent success (Intermediate)		
Team	County	All-Ireland	Provincial	County
Ballon	Carlow	—	—	2009
Ballinagar	Offaly	—	—	—
Cloughbawn	Wexford	—	—	—
Duleek/Bellewstown	Meath	—	—	2005
Dunlavin	Wicklow	—	—	2019
Kilcavan	Laois	—	—	—
Milltown	Kildare	—	—	1972
Milltown	Westmeath	—	—	—
Mostrim	Longford	—	—	1967
Mullinavat	Kilkenny	—	—	2025
Naomh Ólaf	Dublin	—	—	2013
Stabannon Parnells	Louth	—	—	1989

First round
Ballon (Carlow)	4-11
Cloughbawn (Wexford)	1-17
Mostrim (Longford)	0-01
Milltown (Kildare)	2-18
Mullinavat (Kilkenny)	1-09
Duleek/Bellewstown (Meath)	0-15
Kilcavan (Laois)	1-14
Dunlavin (Wicklow)	2-13

Quarter-finals
Ballon (Carlow)	1-13
Naomh Ólaf (Dublin)	1-11
Ballinagar (Offaly)	0-11
Milltown (Westmeath)	0-14
Milltown (Kildare)	1-13
Duleek/Bellewstown (Meath)	1-10
Stabannon Parnells (Louth)	2-14
Dunlavin (Wicklow)	2-15

Semi-finals
Ballon (Carlow)
Milltown (Westmeath)
Milltown (Kildare)
Dunlavin (Wicklow)

Final
Semi-final Winner
Semi-final Winner

=== Round 1 ===
30 October 2026 Round 1	Ballon (Carlow)	4-11 (23) – (20) 1-17	Cloughbawn (Wexford)	Carlow
19:30 GMT (UTC+0)		(HT: 1-06 – 0-06)		Venue: Dr Cullen Park
	Pts: Brian Maher 2-2 (1f), Alex Kelliher 1-4 (1f), Shane Duffy 1-1, Corey Kelliher 0-2, Rory McCaffrey 0-1, Evan Corr 0-1	Report	Pts: Zack Hernan 0-6 (4f), Shane Kehoe 1-2 (1tp), Paddy Whitty 0-4, Cathal Kehoe 0-3 (1tp), Colm Kehoe 0-2	Referee: Darragh Byrne (Wicklow)

31 October 2026 Round 1	Mostrim (Longford)	0-01 (1) – (24) 2-18	Milltown (Kildare)	Longford
13:30 GMT (UTC+0)		(HT: 0-00 – 2-09)		Venue: Pearse Park
	Pts: Ronan Courtney 0-1 (f)	Report	Pts: Ben Curran 1-2, Conor Sheerin 0-5 (1tpf, 1f), Paddy Donoghue 0-4 (3f), Ronan O'Shea 1-0, Alan Digman 0-3, Ben Heuston 0-2, Colin O'Shea 0-1, Liam Kelly 0-1	Referee: Ultan McElroy (Louth)

31 October 2026 Round 1	Kilcavan (Laois)	1-14 (17) – (19) 2-13	Dunlavin (Wicklow)	Portlaoise
14:30 GMT (UTC+0)		(HT: 1-06 – 0-06)		Venue: O'Moore Park
	Pts: Cian Ryle 1-8 (1tpf, 3f, 2'45), Rory Lalor 0-3 (1tp), Niall Lalor 0-2, Evan Hunt 0-1	Report	Pts: Seán Doyle 2-3 (1f), Eoin Miley 0-2 (1f), Pat Kehoe 0-2, Tom Doyle 0-2, James O'Reilly 0-1, Gary Allen 0-1, Jack Reid 0-1 (f)	Referee: Lee Moore (Kildare)

8 November 2026 Round 1	Mullinavat (Kilkenny)	1-09 (12) – (15) 0-15	Duleek/Bellewstown (Meath)	Callan
13:30 GMT (UTC+0)				Venue: John Locke's Park
				Referee: Seamus Farrelly (Dublin)

=== Quarter-finals ===
14 November 2026 Quarter-final	Naomh Ólaf (Dublin)	1-11 (14) – (16) 1-13	Ballon (Carlow)	Dublin
13:00 GMT (UTC+0)				Venue: Parnell Park

14 November 2026 Quarter-final	Milltown (Kildare)	1-13 (16) – (13) 1-10	Duleek/Bellewstown (Meath)	Newbridge
13:30 GMT (UTC+0)				Venue: Cedral St Conleth's

14 November 2026 Quarter-final	Ballinagar (Offaly)	0-11 (11) – (14) 0-14	Milltown (Westmeath)	Tullamore
13:30 GMT (UTC+0)				Venue: Glenisk O'Connor Park

14 November 2026 Quarter-final	Dunlavin (Wicklow)	2-15 (21) – (20) 2-14	Stabannon Parnells (Louth)	Aughrim
14:30 GMT (UTC+0)				Venue: Echelon Park

=== Semi-finals ===
28 November 2026 Semi-final	Ballon (Carlow)	v	Milltown (Westmeath)	Carlow
14:00 GMT (UTC+0)				Venue: Dr Cullen Park

28 November 2026 Semi-final	Milltown (Kildare)	v	Dunlavin (Wicklow)	Newbridge
14:30 GMT (UTC+0)				Venue: Cedral St Conleth's

=== Final ===
12/13 December 2026 Final	SF1 Winner (Leinster)	v	SF2 Winner (Leinster)

== Munster Intermediate Club Football Championship ==
=== Teams ===
Team	County	Most recent success (Intermediate)		
Team	County	All-Ireland	Provincial	County
Banner	Clare	—	—	—
Brickey Rangers	Waterford	—	—	2014
Fossa	Kerry	—	—	—
Killenaule	Tipperary	—	—	2004
Na Piarsaigh	Limerick	—	—	2022
Uíbh Laoire	Cork	—	—	—

Quarter-finals
Killenaule (Tipperary)	1-11
Na Piarsaigh (Limerick)	1-09
Banner (Clare)	2-13
Brickey Rangers (Waterford)	1-13

Semi-finals
Killenaule (Tipperary)	2–04
Uíbh Laoire (Cork)	3–14
Banner (Clare)	0–13
Fossa (Kerry)	2–13

Final
Uíbh Laoire (Cork)
Fossa (Kerry)

=== Quarter-finals ===
8 November 2026 Quarter-final	Killenaule (Tipperary)	1-11 (14) – (12) 1-09	Na Piarsaigh (Limerick)	Clonmel
13:15 GMT (UTC+0)				Venue: Clonmel Sportsfield
		Report		Referee: Sean Joy (Kerry)

8 November 2026 Quarter-final	Banner (Clare)	2-13 (19) – (16) 1-13	Brickey Rangers (Waterford)	Ennis
13:15 GMT (UTC+0)				Venue: Shanaway Road
		Report		Referee: Jonathan Hayes (Limerick)

=== Semi-finals ===
21 November 2026 Semi-final	Fossa (Kerry)	2–13 (19) – (13) 0–13	Banner (Clare)	Fossa
11:45 GMT (UTC+0)				Venue: Fossa GAA

21 November 2026 Semi-final	Uíbh Laoire (Cork)	3–14 (23) – (10) 2–04	Killenaule (Tipperary)	Cork
14:00 GMT (UTC+0)				Venue: Páirc Uí Rinn

=== Final ===
6 December 2026 Final	Fossa (Kerry)	v	Uíbh Laoire (Cork)

== Ulster Intermediate Club Football Championship ==
=== Teams ===
Team	County	Most recent success (Intermediate)		
Team	County	All-Ireland	Provincial	County
Butlersbridge	Cavan	—	—	2021
Desertmartin	Derry	—	—	—
Donaghmoyne	Monaghan	—	—	2021
Kinawley Brian Borus	Fermanagh	—	—	2019
Naomh Éanna	Antrim	—	2018	2018
Naomh Pádraig	Donegal	—	—	—
Rock St Patrick's	Tyrone	—	—	—
Rostrevor	Down	—	—	2017
St Peter's	Armagh	—	—	2018

Round 1
Rostrevor (Down)	3-12
Rock St Patrick's (Tyrone)	3-15

Quarter-finals
Kinawley Brian Borus (Fermanagh)	3-09
Naomh Pádraig (Donegal)	2-15
Donaghmoyne (Monaghan)	1-10
Desertmartin (Derry)	2-17
Naomh Éanna (Antrim)	1-13
Rock St Patrick's (Tyrone)	2-14
Butlersbridge (Cavan)	3-05
St Peter's (Armagh)	2-10

Semi-finals
Naomh Pádraig (Donegal)	2-17
Desertmartin (Derry)	2-15
Rock St Patrick's (Tyrone)
St Peter's (Armagh)

Final
Naomh Pádraig (Donegal)
Semi-final Winner

=== Round 1 ===
31 October 2026 Round 1	Rostrevor (Down)	3-12 (21) – (24) 3-15	Rock St Patrick's (Tyrone)	Burren
15:00 GMT (UTC+0)		(HT: 3-08 – 0-08)		Venue: St Mary's Park
	Pts: Drew Grant 1-2, Calum Langan 1-1, Piaras Kane 1-1, Calum Annett 0-3, Conor Doyle 0-1, Conor Rocks 0-1, James Rice 0-1, James Donaghy 0-1, Hugh Pat McGeary 0-1	Report	Pts: Shane Murphy 0-7 (1tp, 1tpf), Aidan McGarrity 1-2 (1pen), Liam Nugent 0-4 (3f), Thomas Mackle 1-0, Odhran Carroll 1-0, Conor McGarrity 0-2	Referee: Niall McKenna (Monaghan)

=== Quarter-finals ===
7 November 2026 Quarter-final	Donaghmoyne (Monaghan)	1-10 (13) – (23) 2-17	Desertmartin (Derry)	Inniskeen
15:30 GMT (UTC+0)				Venue: Páirc Grattan
				Referee: Neil McGeown

7 November 2026 Quarter-final	Butlersbridge (Cavan)	3-05 (14) – (16) 2-10	St Peter's (Armagh)	Cavan
17:00 GMT (UTC+0)				Venue: Breffni Park
				Referee: Mark Loughran

8 November 2026 Quarter-final	Kinawley Brian Borus (Fermanagh)	3-09 (18) – (21) 2-15	Naomh Pádraig (Donegal)	Enniskillen
13:30 GMT (UTC+0)				Venue: Brewster Park
				Referee: Patrick Clarke

8 November 2026 Quarter-final	Rock St Patrick's (Tyrone)	2-14 (20) – (16) 1-13	Naomh Éanna (Antrim)	Dungannon
15:30 GMT (UTC+0)				Venue: O'Neill Park
				Referee: Margaret Farrelly

=== Semi-finals ===
21 November 2026 Semi-final	Naomh Pádraig (Donegal)	2-17 (23) – (21) 2-15	Desertmartin (Derry)	Omagh
15:30 GMT (UTC+0)				Venue: Healy Park

22 November 2026 Semi-final	St Peter's (Armagh)	v	Rock St Patrick's (Tyrone)	Burren
13:00 GMT (UTC+0)				Venue: St Mary's Park

=== Final ===
5 December 2026 Final	Naomh Pádraig (Donegal)	v	SF2 Winner (Ulster)

== All-Ireland Intermediate Club Football Championship ==
=== Semi-finals ===
2/3 January 2027 Semi-final	Ulster representatives (Ulster)	v	Leinster representatives (Leinster)

2/3 January 2027 Semi-final	Connacht representatives (Connacht)	v	Munster representatives (Munster)

=== Final ===
9/10 January 2027 Final	SF1 Winners (Ulster/Leinster)	v	SF1 Winners (Connacht/Munster)
