= 2012–13 All-Ireland Intermediate Club Football Championship =

Irish Gaelic football competition

- Sponsor: Allied Irish Bank
- Champions: Cookstown Fr. Rock's (2nd title); Owen Mulligan (captain)
- Runners-up: Finuge; Chris Allen (captain)

The 2012–13 All-Ireland Intermediate Club Football Championship was the 10th staging of the All-Ireland Intermediate Club Football Championship since its establishment by the Gaelic Athletic Association for the 2003–04 season.

The All-Ireland final was played on 9 February 2013 at Croke Park in Dublin, between Cookstown Fr. Rock's and Finuge. Cookstown Fr. Rock's won the match by 1–09 to 0–06 to claim their second championship title overall and a first title in three years.
