= Rory Horgan =

Irish hurler

Personal information
- Native name: Ruairí Ó hOrgáin (Irish)
- Born: 1988 (age 37–38) Ardfert, County Kerry, Ireland

Sport
- Sport: Hurling
- Position: Right corner-back
Club
- Years: Club
- St Brendan's
Club titles
- Kerry titles: 1
Inter-county
- Years: County
- 2012-present: Kerry

Rory Horgan (born 1988) is an Irish hurler who plays as a right corner-back for the Kerry senior team.

Born in Ardfert, County Kerry, Horgan first arrived on the inter-county scene at the age of seventeen when he first linked up with the Kerry minor team before later joining the under-21 side. He made his senior debut during the 2012 Waterford Crystal Cup. Horgan quickly became a regular member of the starting fifteen and has won one Christy Ring Cup medal. He has been a Christy Ring Cup runner-up on one occasion.

As a Gaelic footballer with St Brendan's Horgan is a one-time All-Ireland medallist in the intermediate grade. In addition to this he has also won one Munster medal and one championship medal in the same grade. As a hurler Horgan is a one-time championship medallist in the senior grade.

== Honours ==
=== Team ===
St Brendan's

- All-Ireland Intermediate Club Football Championship (1): 2015
- Munster Intermediate Club Football Championship (1): 2014
- Kerry Intermediate Football Championship (1): 2014
- Kerry Senior Hurling Championship (1): 2013

Kerry

- Christy Ring Cup (1): 2015
- National League (Division 2A) (1): 2015
- All-Ireland Under 21 B Hurling Championship (1): 2009
- All-Ireland Minor B Hurling Championship (1): 2006
