= 2007–08 All-Ireland Intermediate Club Football Championship =

Irish Gaelic football competition

- Sponsor: Allied Irish Bank
- Champions: Moycullen (1st title)
- Runners-up: Fingal Ravens

The 2007–08 All-Ireland Intermediate Club Football Championship was the fifth staging of the All-Ireland Intermediate Club Football Championship since its establishment by the Gaelic Athletic Association for the 2003–04 season.

The All-Ireland final was played on 17 February 2008 at Croke Park in Dublin, between Moycullen and Fingal Ravens. Moycullen won the match by 2-09 to 1-06 to claim their first ever championship title.
