= 2008–09 All-Ireland Intermediate Club Football Championship =

Irish Gaelic football competition

- Sponsor: Allied Irish Bank
- Champions: St Michael's/Foilmore (1st title)
- Runners-up: St Michael's

The 2008–09 All-Ireland Intermediate Club Football Championship was the sixth staging of the All-Ireland Intermediate Club Football Championship since its establishment by the Gaelic Athletic Association for the 2003–04 season.

The All-Ireland final was played on 14 February 2009 at Croke Park in Dublin, between St Michael's/Foilmore and St Michael's. St Michael's/Foilmore won the match by 1-13 to 1-09 to claim their first ever championship title.
