= 2006–07 All-Ireland Intermediate Club Football Championship =

Irish Gaelic football competition

- Sponsor: Allied Irish Bank
- Champions: Ardfert (1st title)
- Runners-up: Eoghan Rua

The 2006–07 All-Ireland Intermediate Club Football Championship was the fourth staging of the All-Ireland Intermediate Club Football Championship since its establishment by the Gaelic Athletic Association for the 2003–04 season.

The All-Ireland final was played on 10 March 2007 at Croke Park in Dublin, between Ardfert and Eoghan Rua. Ardfert won the match by 1-04 to 0-05 to claim their first ever championship title.
