= 2019–20 All-Ireland Intermediate Club Football Championship =

Irish Gaelic football competition

- Sponsor: Allied Irish Bank
- Champions: Oughterard (1st title); Eddie O'Sullivan (captain); Tommy Finnerty (manager)
- Runners-up: Magheracloone Mitchells

The 2019–20 All-Ireland Intermediate Club Football Championship was the 17th staging of the All-Ireland Intermediate Club Football Championship since its establishment by the Gaelic Athletic Association for the 2003–04 season.

The All-Ireland final was played on 25 January 2020 at Croke Park in Dublin, between Oughterard and Magheracloone Mitchells. Oughterard won the match by 2-16 to 0-12 to claim their first ever championship title.

== All-Ireland Intermediate Club Football Championship ==
=== All-Ireland semi-finals ===
11 January 2020 Semi-final	Oughterard	1-12 - 0-12	Templenoe	FitzGerald Park, Kilmallock

11 January 2020 Semi-final	Magheracloone Mitchells	0-24 - 1-08	Mattock Rangers	St. Oliver Plunkett Park

=== All-Ireland final ===
25 January 2020 Final	Oughterard	2-16 - 0-12	Magheracloone Mitchells	Croke Park
	C Clancy 1-1, N Lee 0-4 (0-2f), E Tierney 0-3 (0-2f), E Lee 1-0, C Monaghan, R Monaghan and P Walsh 0-2 each, M Tierney (0-1f) and I Gibbons (0-1f) 0-1 each.	Report	T Freeman 0-5 (0-3f), G Doogan 0-2, J Doogan, R Farrelly, M Metzger, J Ward and P McMahon 0-1 each.	Referee: S Laverty (Antrim)
