= 2018–19 All-Ireland Intermediate Club Football Championship =

Irish Gaelic football competition

- Sponsor: Allied Irish Bank
- Champions: Kilcummin (1st title); Brendan Kealy (captain); Willie Maher (manager)
- Runners-up: Naomh Éanna

The 2018–19 All-Ireland Intermediate Club Football Championship was the 16th staging of the All-Ireland Intermediate Club Football Championship since its establishment by the Gaelic Athletic Association for the 2003–04 season.

The All-Ireland final was played on 9 February 2019 at Croke Park in Dublin, between Kilcummin and Naomh Éanna. Kilcummin won the match by 5-13 to 2-09 to claim their first ever championship title.

== All-Ireland Intermediate Club Football Championship ==
=== All-Ireland semi-finals ===
20 January 2019 Semi-final	Kilcummin	0-11 - 0-10	Two Mile House	Gaelic Grounds

20 January 2019 Semi-final	Naomh Éanna	3-09 - 0-11	An Spidéal	Páirc Tailteann

=== All-Ireland final ===
9 February 2019 Final	Kilcummin	5-13 - 2-09	Naomh Éanna	Croke Park
