= 2009–10 All-Ireland Intermediate Club Football Championship =

Irish Gaelic football competition

- Sponsor: Allied Irish Bank
- Champions: Cookstown Fr. Rock's (1st title)
- Runners-up: Spa

The 2009–10 All-Ireland Intermediate Club Football Championship was the seventh staging of the All-Ireland Intermediate Club Football Championship since its establishment by the Gaelic Athletic Association for the 2003–04 season.

The All-Ireland final was played on 14 February 2010 at Croke Park in Dublin, between Cookstown Fr. Rock's and Spa. Cookstown Fr. Rock's won the match by 1-07 to 0-08 to claim their first ever championship title.
