= 2016–17 All-Ireland Intermediate Club Football Championship =

Irish Gaelic football competition

- Sponsor: Allied Irish Bank
- Champions: Westport (1st title); Kevin Keane (captain)
- Runners-up: St. Colmcille's; Ben Brennan (captain)

The 2016–17 All-Ireland Intermediate Club Football Championship was the 14th staging of the All-Ireland Intermediate Club Football Championship since its establishment by the Gaelic Athletic Association for the 2003–04 season.

The All-Ireland final was played on 19 February 2017 at Croke Park in Dublin, between Westport and St. Colmcille's. Westport won the match by 2–12 to 3–08 to claim their first ever championship title.

== All-Ireland Intermediate Club Football Championship ==
=== All-Ireland semi-finals ===
29 January 2017 Semi-final	Westport	1-10 - 0-11	Kenmare Shamrocks	Cusack Park

29 January 2017 Semi-final	St. Colmcille's	3-11 - 2-12	Pomeroy Plunketts	Athletic Grounds

=== All-Ireland final ===
19 February 2017 Final	Westport	2-12 - 3-08	St. Colmcille's	Croke Park
