= Mark Lydon =

Irish hurler and Gaelic footballer

Personal information
- Native name: Marc Ó Loideáin (Irish)
- Born: 1985 (age 40–41) Galway, Ireland
- Height: 6 ft 3 in (191 cm)

Sport
- Football Position: Midfield
- Hurling Position: Centre Back
Club
- Years: Club
- Moycullen
Club titles
	Football	Hurling
Galway titles	1	1 (Inter)
Connacht titles	1 (Inter)	1 (Inter)
All-Ireland titles	1 (Inter)	
Inter-county
- Years: County
- 2008–2009 2012–2013: Galway (F); Galway (H)
Inter-county titles
	Football	Hurling
Connacht Titles	1	1 (Leinster)

Mark Lydon (born 1985 in Galway) is an Irish sportsperson. He plays Gaelic football and hurling with his local club Moycullen. He has been a member of the Galway senior inter-county team since 2008 and the Galway senior hurling team since 2012.
