= Cill na Martra GFC =

Gaelic games club in County Cork, Ireland

Cill na Martra
- Cill na Martra
- Founded: 1887
- County: Cork
- Colours
- Grounds: Páirc Uí Chuana
- Coordinates: 51°53′57″N 9°05′01″W

Playing kits
Standard colours

Senior Club Championships
	All Ireland	Munster champions	Cork champions
Football:	0	0	0

Cill Na Martra GFC is a Gaelic Athletic Association club located in Kilnamartyra, County Cork, Ireland. The club is affiliated to the Muskerry Board and the Cork County Board and is solely concerned with the game of Gaelic football.

== History ==
Located in the village of Kilnamartyra, about 6 miles west of Macroom, Gaelic football had been played in the area since the early years of the Gaelic Athletic Association. The first recorded victory for the club occurred in 1887 in a 21-a-side match against a team from Ballinagree. Gaelic football continued to be played on an irregular basis, with teams from Cill na Martra reaching divisional finals in 1938, 1958 and 1964.

Cill na Martra was re-established on a permanent basis in 1978. The club's first notable successes came with the winning of consecutive Mid Cork JAFC titles in 2002 and 2003. Cill na Martra's first county success occurred in 2018, when Cill na Martra beat Aghabullogue by 2–17 to 1–10 to win the Cork IFC.

Five years later, Cill na Martra secured senior status for the first time in its history, after winning the Cork PIFC title with a 3–11 to 2–13 defeat of Bantry Blues in the final. This win was subsequently converted into a Munster Club IFC title after an 11-point defeat of Mungret/St Paul's. Cill na Martra were later beaten by St Patrick's Cullyhanna in the 2024 All-Ireland Club IFC final.

== Honours ==
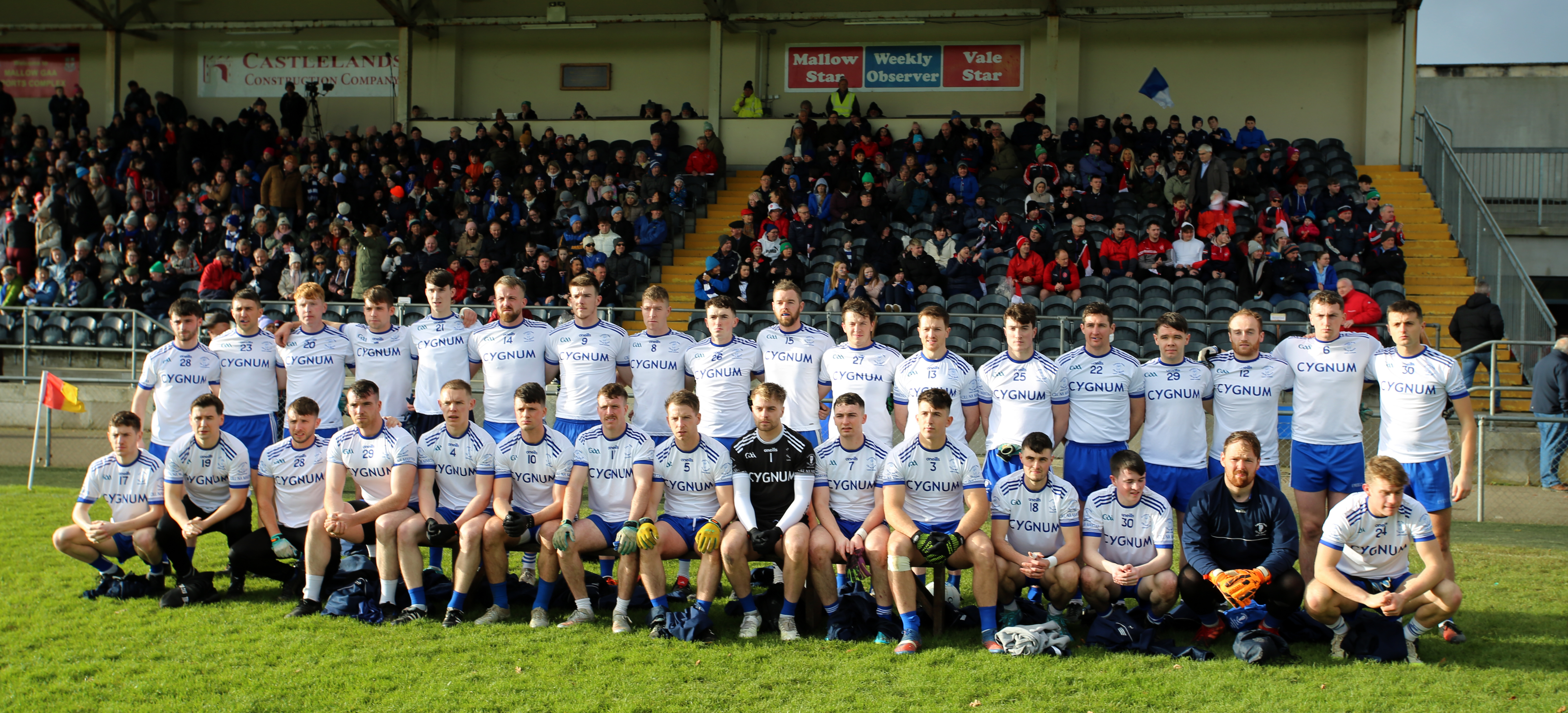
Cill na Martra team, 2023

- Munster Intermediate Club Football Championship (1): 2023
- Cork Premier Intermediate Football Championship (1): 2023
- Cork Intermediate Football Championship (1): 2018
- Mid Cork Junior A Football Championship (2): 2002, 2003
- Cork Under-21 B Football Championship (1): 2015
- Cork Minor C Football Championship (3): 1999, 2004, 2013

== Notable players ==
- Noel O'Leary: All-Ireland SFC-winner (2010)
