= Ardfert GAA =

Gaelic football club in County Kerry, Ireland

Ardfert
- Cumann Lúthchleas Gael Ard Fhearta
- Founded: 1979
- County: Kerry
- Colours: Black and white
- Grounds: Ardfert
- Coordinates: 52°19′10.97″N 9°46′39.76″W

Playing kits
Standard colours

Ardfert are a Gaelic football team in north County Kerry, Ireland. They are one of two clubs in Ardfert, St Brendan's Hurling Club being the local hurling club. They play in the County Junior Football Championship and Div 2 County League.

By winning the Kerry Junior Football Championship in 2005 by beating Cordal 3–11 to 3–07 they were promoted to the Kerry Intermediate Football Championship and represented Kerry in the Munster Junior Club Football Championship and in that final they beat Erin's Own 1–08 to 0–10 and represented Munster in the All-Ireland Junior Club Football Championship. On 19 February 2006, they won this championship in Croke Park by beating Loughrea 1–07 to 0–09.

In 2006, they won the Kerry Intermediate Football Championship beating Annascaul and represented Kerry at the Munster Intermediate Club Football Championship where they defeated Corofin of Clare 1–06 to 1–04. They then went on to the All-Ireland Intermediate Club Football Championship final winning that as well 1–04 to 0–05 by defeating Eoghan Rua of Derry. They now play in the Kerry Senior Club Football Championship.

== Honours ==
- All-Ireland Intermediate Club Football Championship Winner (2) 2007, 2015
- All-Ireland Junior Club Football Championship Winner (1) 2006
- Munster Intermediate Club Football Championship Winners (2) 2006, 2014
- Munster Junior Club Football Championship Winner (1) 2005
- Kerry Intermediate Football Championship Winners (2) 2006, 2014
- Kerry Junior Football Championship Winners (2) 1987, 2005
- Kerry Novice Football Championship Winner (1) 1981
- St. Brendan's District Senior Football Championship Winners (4) 2002, 2005, 2011, 2016

== Kerry County Football League ==
Ardfert won the Kerry County Football League – Division 5 North in 2003, Kerry County Football League – Division 3 in 2004, Kerry County Football League – Division 3 in 2005 and Kerry County Football League – Division 2 in 2006. After the 2006 win, the club were promoted to Kerry County Football League – Division 1 for the 2007 season.

Preceded by Inniskeen Grattans	All-Ireland Intermediate Club Football Champions; 2007	Succeeded by Moycullen
Preceded by Finuge	All-Ireland Junior Club Football Champions; 2006	Succeeded by St. Patricks, Greencastle
