= All-Ireland Intermediate Club Football Championship =

Annual Irish Gaelic football competition

- Current season or competition: 2026–27 All-Ireland Intermediate Club Football Championship
- Irish: Craobh Idirmhéanach Peile Chlub na hÉireann
- Code: Gaelic football
- Founded: 2003–04
- Region: Ireland (GAA)
- No. of teams: 4
- Title holders: An Ghaeltacht (1st title)
- First winner: Ilen Rovers
- Most titles: Cookstown Fr Rock's; Ardfert (2 titles)
- Sponsors: Allied Irish Banks (AIB)
- TV partner: TG4

The All-Ireland Intermediate Club Football Championship, known for sponsorship reasons as the AIB All-Ireland Intermediate Club Football Championship and shortened to All-Ireland Club IFC, is an annual Gaelic football competition organised by the GAA. It is played between the Intermediate championship winners from each of the thirty-two counties of Ireland. 'Intermediate' competitions are generally the second-tier contests in each county, below 'Senior' level; the clubs involved are generally smaller, from less populous areas.

Each team competes in their own provincial championship, with the four provincial winners competing in the All-Ireland. The competition has a straight knock-out format. It was first held in 2004 as an unofficial tournament, and has been an official GAA championship since the 2004–05 edition.

Kerry clubs have had the most success, winning the competition seven times. Cookstown Fr. Rock's and Ardfert have both won the competition twice. The current champions are An Ghaeltacht from Kerry.

== Teams ==
=== Qualification ===
Province	Championship
Connacht	Connacht Intermediate Club Football Championship
Leinster	Leinster Intermediate Club Football Championship
Munster	Munster Intermediate Club Football Championship
Ulster	Ulster Intermediate Club Football Championship

== List of finals ==
List of All-Ireland Intermediate Club Football Championship finals
Year	Winners		Score	Runners-up		Venue	Ref.
Year	County	Club	Score	County	Club	Venue	Ref.
2003–04 (Note: Unofficial tournament)	Cork	Ilen Rovers	1–11 – 1–04	Donegal	St Michael's	Páirc Mhearnóg, Portmarnock	
2004–05	Cork	Carbery Rangers	1–14 – 0–08	Tyrone	Pomeroy	O'Moore Park, Portlaoise	
2005–06	Monaghan	Inniskeen Grattans	2–10 – 1–11	Galway	Caherlistrane	Croke Park, Dublin	
2006–07	Kerry	Ardfert	1–04 – 0–05	Derry	Eoghan Rua, Coleraine	Croke Park, Dublin	
2007–08	Galway	Moycullen	2–09 – 1–06	Dublin	Fingal Ravens	Croke Park, Dublin	
2008–09	Kerry	St Michael's/Foilmore	1–13 – 1–09	Galway	St Michael's	Croke Park, Dublin	
2009–10	Tyrone	Cookstown Fr. Rock's	1–07 – 0–08	Kerry	Spa	Croke Park, Dublin	
2010–11	Fermanagh	Lisnaskea Emmetts	1–16 – 0–15 (aet)	Galway	St James'	Croke Park, Dublin	
2011–12	Kerry	Milltown/Castlemaine	1–13 – 1–06	Mayo	Davitts	Croke Park, Dublin	
2012–13	Tyrone	Cookstown Fr. Rock's	1–09 – 0–06	Kerry	Finuge	Croke Park, Dublin	
2013–14	Monaghan	Truagh Gaels	2–21 – 2–13	Mayo	Kiltane	Croke Park, Dublin	
2014–15	Kerry	Ardfert	1–14 – 0–09	Roscommon	St Croan's	Croke Park, Dublin	
2015–16	Kerry	St Mary's	2–10 – 0–10	Mayo	Hollymount Carramore	Croke Park, Dublin	
2016–17	Mayo	Westport	2–12 – 3–08	Meath	St Colmcille's	Croke Park, Dublin	
2017–18	Tyrone	Moy	1–10 – 0–07	Roscommon	Michael Glaveys	Croke Park, Dublin	
2018–19	Kerry	Kilcummin	5–13 – 2–09	Antrim	Naomh Éanna	Croke Park, Dublin	
2019–20	Galway	Oughterard	2–16 – 0–12	Monaghan	Magheracloone Mitchells	Croke Park, Dublin	
2020–21	Competition cancelled due to COVID-19 pandemic						
2021–22	Derry	Steelstown	3–14 – 2–05	Meath	Trim	Croke Park, Dublin	
2022–23	Kerry	Rathmore	1–11 – 0–11	Tyrone	Galbally	Croke Park, Dublin	
2023–24	Armagh	St Patrick's, Cullyhanna	1–08 – 0–07	Cork	Cill na Martra	Croke Park, Dublin	
2024–25	Mayo	Crossmolina Deel Rovers	1–12 – 0–13	Derry	Ballinderry Shamrocks	Croke Park, Dublin	
2025–26	Kerry	An Ghaeltacht	0–12 – 0–06	Derry	Glenullin	Croke Park, Dublin	

== Performances ==
=== By county ===
Performances in the All-Ireland Intermediate Club Football Championship by county
County	Titles	Runners-up	Years won	Years runners-up
Kerry	8	2	2007, 2009, 2012, 2015, 2016, 2019, 2023, 2026	2010, 2013
Tyrone	3	2	2010, 2013, 2018	2005, 2023
Galway	2	3	2008, 2020	2006, 2009, 2011
Mayo	2	3	2017, 2025	2012, 2014, 2016
Cork	2	1	2004, 2005	2024
Monaghan	2	1	2006, 2014	2020
Derry	1	3	2022	2007, 2025, 2026
Fermanagh	1	0	2011	—
Armagh	1	0	2024	—
Roscommon	0	2	—	2015, 2018
Meath	0	2	—	2017, 2022
Donegal	0	1	—	2004
Dublin	0	1	—	2008
Antrim	0	1	—	2019

=== By club ===
Performances in the All-Ireland Intermediate Club Football Championship by club
Club	Titles	Runners-up	Years won	Years runners-up
Ardfert	2	0	2007, 2015	—
Cookstown Fr. Rock's	2	0	2010, 2013	—
Ilen Rovers	1	0	2004	—
Carbery Rangers	1	0	2005	—
Inniskeen Grattans	1	0	2006	—
Moycullen	1	0	2008	—
St Michael's/Foilmore	1	0	2009	—
Lisnaskea Emmetts	1	0	2011	—
Milltown/Castlemaine	1	0	2012	—
Truagh Gaels	1	0	2014	—
St Mary's	1	0	2016	—
Westport	1	0	2017	—
Moy	1	0	2018	—
Kilcummin	1	0	2019	—
Oughterard	1	0	2020	—
Steelstown	1	0	2022	—
Rathmore	1	0	2023	—
St Patrick's, Cullyhanna	1	0	2024	—
Crossmolina Deel Rovers	1	0	2025	—
An Ghaeltacht	1	0	2026	—
St Michael's (Donegal)	0	1	—	2004
Pomeroy	0	1	—	2005
Caherlistrane	0	1	—	2006
Eoghan Rua, Coleraine	0	1	—	2007
Fingal Ravens	0	1	—	2008
St Michael's (Galway)	0	1	—	2009
Spa	0	1	—	2010
St James'	0	1	—	2011
Davitts	0	1	—	2012
Finuge	0	1	—	2013
Kiltane	0	1	—	2014
St Croan's	0	1	—	2015
Hollymount Carramore	0	1	—	2016
St Colmcille's	0	1	—	2017
Michael Glaveys	0	1	—	2018
Naomh Éanna	0	1	—	2019
Magheracloone Mitchells	0	1	—	2020
Trim	0	1	—	2022
Galbally	0	1	—	2023
Cill na Martra	0	1	—	2024
Ballinderry Shamrocks	0	1	—	2025
Glenullin	0	1	—	2026

=== By province ===
Performances in finals by province
Province	Titles	Runners-up	Total
Munster	10	3	13
Ulster	8	8	16
Connacht	4	8	12
Leinster	0	3	3

== See also ==
- Munster Intermediate Club Football Championship
- Leinster Intermediate Club Football Championship
- Connacht Intermediate Club Football Championship
- Ulster Intermediate Club Football Championship
