= Caherlistrane GAC =

Gaelic sports club in County Galway, Ireland

Caherlistrane
- Cathair Lios Greáin
- Founded: 1888
- County: Galway
- Nickname: The Queallys
- Colours: White & Blue
- Grounds: Caherlistrane GAA Grounds
- Coordinates: 53°29′25.81″N 9°01′10.69″W

Playing kits
Standard colours

Senior Club Championships
	All Ireland	Connacht champions	Galway champions
Football:	-	-	1

Caherlistrane is a Gaelic Athletic Association club based in County Galway, Ireland. The club is a member of the Galway GAA. Underage teams up to U-16's play in the Galway league and championships while further age groups compete in their respective competitions.

They are one of the oldest established Gaelic Football clubs in Galway. Their only success in the Galway Senior Football Championship came in 1890, and reached their last final in 1892. In recent times, they have looked to bridge that long gap, reaching the semi-finals in 2008. In 2006, they reached the 2006 All-Ireland Intermediate Club Football Championship Final but lost to Inniskeen Grattan's of Monaghan.

== Honours ==
- Galway Senior Football Championship: (1) 1890
- Connacht Intermediate Club Football Championship: (1) 2005
- Galway Intermediate Football Championship: (1) 2005
- Galway Intermediate Football League: (1) 2005
- Galway Junior 'A' Football Championship: (1) 2007
- Galway Minor 'A' Football League: (1) 2007
- Galway Minor Football Championship: (1) 1988

== External Sources ==
- Official Website
