= Munster Intermediate Club Football Championship =

- Current season or competition: 2026 Munster Intermediate Club Football Championship
- Irish: Craobh Idirmhéanach Peile Chlub na Mumhan
- Founded: 2003
- Region: Munster (GAA)
- Trophy: Risteárd Ó Cuimín Cup
- No. of teams: 6
- Title holders: An Ghaeltacht (2nd title)
- Most titles: Carbery Rangers Ardfert An Ghaeltacht (2 titles)

The Munster Football Intermediate Club Championship, known for sponsorship reasons as the AIB Munster Intermediate Club Football Championship and shortened to Munster Club IFC, is an annual Gaelic football competition organised by the Munster Council of the Gaelic Athletic Association since 2003 for the top intermediate clubs in the province of Munster in Ireland. It is sponsored by the Allied Irish Bank.

The series of games are played during the autumn and winter months with the Munster intermediate final currently being played in late November. The championship has always been played on a straight knockout basis.

The Munster Championship is an integral part of the wider All-Ireland Intermediate Club Football Championship. The winners of the Munster final join the champions of Connacht, Leinster and Ulster in the semi-final stages of the All-Ireland series of games.

Six clubs currently participate in the Munster Championship. The winners receive the Risteárd Ó Cuimín Cup, named for Dick Cummins of Fethard, first Chairman of the Munster Council (1901–03).

The title has been won at least once by clubs representing just two of the six Munster counties, with Kerry and Cork clubs holding the distinction of sharing every provincial title. The all-time record-holders are Carbery Rangers, An Ghaeltacht and Ardfert who have won the competition twice.

== Teams ==
=== Qualification ===
County	Championship	Qualifying team
Clare	Clare Intermediate Football Championship	Champions
Cork	Cork Premier Intermediate Football Championship	Champions
Kerry	Kerry Intermediate Football Championship	Champions
Limerick	Limerick Intermediate Football Championship	Champions
Tipperary	Tipperary Intermediate Football Championship	Champions
Waterford	Waterford Intermediate Football Championship	Champions

== Roll of Honour ==
=== By club ===
#	Club	County	Titles	Championships won
1	Carbery Rangers	COR	2	2004, 2005
1	Ardfert	KER	2	2006, 2014
1	An Ghaeltacht	KER	2	2017, 2025
3	Ilen Rovers	COR	1	2003
3	Annascaul	KER	1	2007
3	St Michael's/Foilmore	KER	1	2008
3	Spa	KER	1	2009
3	Gneeveguilla	KER	1	2010
3	Milltown/Castlemaine	KER	1	2011
3	Finuge	KER	1	2012
3	Clyda Rovers	COR	1	2013
3	St Mary’s	KER	1	2015
3	Kenmare Shamrocks	KER	1	2016
3	Kilcummin	KER	1	2018
3	Templenoe	KER	1	2019
3	Na Gaeil	KER	1	2021
3	Rathmore	KER	1	2022
3	Cill na Martra	COR	1	2023
3	Austin Stacks	KER	1	2024

=== By county ===
#	County	Titles	Runners-up	Championships won	Championships runner-up
1	Kerry	17	0	2006, 2007, 2008, 2009, 2010, 2011, 2012, 2014, 2015, 2016, 2017, 2018, 2019, 2021, 2022, 2024, 2025	—
2	Cork	5	6	2003, 2004, 2005, 2013, 2023	2007, 2012, 2014, 2015, 2018 2025
3	Clare	0	7	—	2006, 2008, 2009, 2010, 2013, 2019, 2021
3	Limerick	0	6	—	2003, 2005, 2016, 2017, 2022, 2023
3	Waterford	0	1	—	2004
3	Tipperary	0	1	—	2011

== List of finals ==
=== Key ===
All-Ireland champions
All-Ireland runners-up

=== Munster finals ===
Year	Winners			Runners-up			Venue	Winning Captain
Year	County	Club	Score	County	Club	Score	Venue	Winning Captain
2025	KER	An Ghaeltacht	2-12	COR	Aghabullouge	1-08	Mick Neville Park	PJ Mac Láimh
2024	KER	Austin Stacks	7–07	TIP	Aherlow	0–02	Mallow GAA Complex	Greg Horan
2023	COR	Cill Na Martra	3–12	LIM	Mungret/St. Paul's	0–10	Mallow GAA Complex	Gearóid Ó Goillidhe
2022	KER	Rathmore	1-17	LIM	Na Piarsaigh	0-10	Mallow GAA Complex	Mark Ryan
2021	KER	Na Gaeil	6-15	CLA	Corofin	1-12	Mallow GAA Complex	Eoin Doody
2020	Cancelled due to the impact of the COVID-19 pandemic on Gaelic games							
2019	KER	Templenoe	0-14	CLA	St Breckan's, Lisdoonvarna	0-05	Mallow GAA Complex	Brian Crowley
2018	KER	Kilcummin	1-11	COR	Fermoy	1-03	Mallow GAA Complex	Brendan Kealy
2017	KER	An Ghaeltacht	3-21	LIM	St Senan's	0-08	Austin Stack Park	Colm Ó Muirchtéaraigh
2016	KER	Kenmare Shamrocks	1-20	LIM	Adare	1-06	Mallow GAA Complex	Stephen O'Brien
2015	KER	St. Mary's	1-16	COR	Carrigaline	0-09	Fitzgerald Stadium	Sean Cournane
2014	KER	Ardfert	1-12	COR	Valley Rovers	1-10	Fitzgerald Stadium	Jerry Wallace
2013	COR	Clyda Rovers	0-10	CLA	St Joseph's Miltown Malbay	0-07	Gaelic Grounds	Ollie O'Hanlon
2012	KER	Finuge	1-05	COR	St Vincent's	0-05	Mallow GAA Complex	Chris Allen
2011	KER	Milltown/Castlemaine	1-14	TIP	Mullinahone	0-06	Mallow GAA Complex	Damien Murphy
2010	KER	Gneeveguilla	1-11	CLA	St Breckan's, Lisdoonvarna	0-07	Gaelic Grounds	Don Murphy
2009	KER	Spa	2-11	CLA	Cratloe	0-10	Mallow GAA Complex	Niall O'Mahony
2008	KER	St Michael's/Foilmore	2-13	CLA	Kilmihil	0-07	Mallow GAA Complex	Kieran Granfield
2007	KER	Annascaul	0-13	COR	Mallow	0-07	Fitzgerald Staium	Tommy Farrell
2006	KER	Ardfert	1-06	CLA	Corofin	1-04	Gaelic Grounds	Jonathon Best
2005	COR	Carbery Rangers	1-10	LIM	Pallasgreen	1-07	Páirc Mac Gearailt	
2004	COR	Carbery Rangers	0-14	WAT	Gaultier	1-05	Páirc Mac Gearailt	Johnny Murphy
2003	COR	Ilen Rovers	2-19	LIM	St Senan's	0-07		Kieren Daly

== See also ==
- All-Ireland Intermediate Club Football Championship
- Ulster Intermediate Club Football Championship
- Connacht Intermediate Club Football Championship
- Leinster Intermediate Club Football Championship
