= Moycullen GAA =

Gaelic sports clubs in County Galway, Ireland

Moycullen
- Maigh Cuilinn
- Founded: 1912
- County: Galway
- Colours: Green and white
- Grounds: Páirc Mhaigh Cuillin
- Coordinates: 53.35885°N 9.175989°W

Playing kits
Standard colours

Senior Club Championships
	All Ireland	Connacht champions	Galway champions
Football:	-	1	3

Moycullen GAA (Irish: CLG Maigh Cuilinn) is a group title for several Gaelic games clubs based in Moycullen, County Galway. The three clubs, Cumann Peile Mhaigh Cuilinn (Moycullen Football Club), Cumann Iománaíocht Maigh Cuilinn (Moycullen Hurling Club) and Cumann Camógaíocht Mhaigh Cuilinn (Moycullen Camogie Club) share playing facilities and cooperate on a number of local community and sporting issues. The clubs are members of the Galway GAA branch of the Gaelic Athletic Association. There are two other clubs in the parish with indirect GAA affiliations, Moycullen Ladies Football Club and Moycullen Handball Club, who also share the club facilities.

The club facilities are situated in the townland of Baile Dóite and include two full-size pitches, a 25 square metre all-weather pitch, a 20-metre double-sided practice wall, a 200 capacity covered stand, player changing facilities and some small meeting rooms. The site also includes a stand-alone indoor handball complex. There is also considerable capacity for car parking. The history of the GAA in Moycullen goes back to the beginning of the 20th century. It was first organised within the parish by 1912.

== Cumann Peile Mhaigh Cuilinn ==
The football club (Cumann Peile Mhaigh Cuilinn) is in the West Board section of the Galway League and Championships and takes part in all under-age, junior and senior competitions in the county.

Moycullen achieved Senior status in football in 1964 by winning the County Junior Championship and, except for a short stay at Intermediate level in 2008, Moycullen has been senior ever since, having reached 3 County Final. They won their first County Final on their 4th attempt in 2020.

In 2008, the club enjoyed great success at Intermediate level. Having won the County Intermediate title in 2007, Moycullen progressed to the Connacht Intermediate Club Football Championship final, where they defeated Ballintubber of Mayo by 3-11 to 1-08. In the All-Ireland semi-final, they defeated Annascaul after a close encounter, reaching their first ever All-Ireland Intermediate Club Football Championship Final. The final on 18 February at Croke Park was played against Fingal Ravens. A tense game was eventually decided in the last ten minutes, when Conor Bohan struck two goals, ensuring Moycullen were crowned All-Ireland Intermediate Champions, at a score of 2-09 to 1-06. It was the completion of a well-deserved treble.

Over the years, many players have been honoured in all grades by the county. Paul Clancy, an All-Ireland winner in 1998 and 2001, played with the club and worked as a selector with former senior football manager Alan Mulholland. Gareth Bradshaw, Mark Lydon, and David Wynne were recent members of the Galway football panel. In 2022, Seán Kelly was named Galway captain.

== Honours ==
- Connacht Senior Club Football Championship (1): 2022
- Galway Senior Football Championship (3): 2020, 2022, 2025
- All-Ireland Intermediate Club Football Championship (1): 2008
- Connacht Intermediate Club Football Championship (1):2008 Runner-Up 2015
- Galway Intermediate Football Championship (2): 2007, 2015
- Galway Senior B League Champions (1): 2009
- Galway Under-21 West Board Football Championship (1):2005, 2012
- Galway Under-21 West Board Football League (1): 2003
- Galway Minor Football Championship (3): 1966, 2013, 2022
- Galway Minor Football West Board Championship (3): 1966, 2013, 2022
- Galway Minor B Football West Board Championship (2): 1999, 2000

== Notable players ==
- Seán Kelly, appointed Galway senior captain in 2022
- Dessie Conneely
- Donogh McDonogh
- Michael Lee T
- Richie Lee
- Peter Cooke
- Paul Clancy
- Paul Kelly
- Owen Gallagher
- David Wynne
- Gareth Bradshaw
- Mark Lydon
