= Connacht Intermediate Club Football Championship =

Gaelic football competition

- Current season or competition: 2026 Connacht Intermediate Club Football Championship
- Irish: Craobh Idirmhéanach Peile Chonnacht na gClub
- Code: Gaelic football
- Founded: 2003
- Region: Connacht (GAA)
- No. of teams: 5
- Title holders: Strokestown (1st title)
- First winner: Elphin
- Most titles: No team has won more than once
- Sponsors: Allied Irish Banks

The Connacht Intermediate Club Football Championship, known for sponsorship reasons as the AIB Connacht Intermediate Club Football Championship and shortened to the Connacht Club IFC, is a Gaelic football competition played between the Intermediate Championship winner from each county in Connacht. The winners compete for the All-Ireland Intermediate Club Football Championship.

== List of finals ==
| Year | Winner | Score | County | Opponent | Score | County |
|---|---|---|---|---|---|---|
| 2025 | Strokestown | 4-11 | Roscommon | Kilmeena | 0-14 | Mayo |
| 2024 | Crossmolina Deel Rovers | 1-07 | Mayo | Elphin | 1-06 | Roscommon |
| 2023 | Castlerea St. Kevin's | 2-04 | Roscommon | Monivea Abbey | 0-08 | Galway |
| 2022 | Dunmore McHales | 1-16 | Galway | St Dominic's | 1-13 | Roscommon |
| 2021 | St Faithleach's | 2-14 | Roscommon | Naomh Anna, Leitir Móir | 2-12 | Galway |
| 2020 | Cancelled due to COVID-19 pandemic | | | | | |
| 2019 | Oughterard | 1-16 | Galway | The Neale | 0-11 | Mayo |
| 2018 | An Spidéal | 1-14 | Galway | Fuerty | 0-16 | Roscommon |
| 2017 | Michael Glavey's | 3-14 | Roscommon | Claregalway | 1-12 | Galway |
| 2016 | Westport | 1-09 | Mayo | Ballinamore Seán O'Heslin's | 0-07 | Leitrim |
| 2015 | Hollymount-Carramore | 0-09 | Mayo | Moycullen | 0-08 | Galway |
| 2014 | St Croan's | 2-10 | Roscommon | Killanin | 0-11 | Galway |
| 2013 | Kiltane | 3-10 | Mayo | Boyle | 2-04 | Roscommon |
| 2012 | Charlestown Sarsfields | 0-14 | Mayo | Bunninadden | 0-08 | Sligo |
| 2011 | Davitts | 1-13 | Mayo | Padraig Pearses | 0-08 | Roscommon |
| 2010 | St James' | 0-14 | Galway | Strokestown | 1-09 | Roscommon |
| 2009 | Naomh Anna | 2-14 | Galway | Westport | 2-13 | Mayo |
| 2008 | St Michael's | 1-09 | Galway | Kilbride | 1-08 | Roscommon |
| 2007 | Moycullen | 3-11 | Galway | Ballintubber | 1-08 | Mayo |
| 2006 | Tuar Mhic Éadaigh | 0-07 | Mayo | Carrigallen | 1-03 | Leitrim |
| 2005 | Caherlistrane | 0-13 | Galway | Boyle | 0-05 | Roscommon |
| 2004 | Western Gaels | 1-10 | Roscommon | Calry-St Joseph's | 0-07 | Sligo |
| 2003 | Elphin | 1-10 | Roscommon | Cortoon Shamrocks | 0-08 | Galway |

== See also ==
- Munster Intermediate Club Football Championship
- Leinster Intermediate Club Football Championship
- Ulster Intermediate Club Football Championship
