= Leinster Intermediate Club Football Championship =

Annual Gaelic football tournament

- Current season or competition: 2026 Leinster Intermediate Club Football Championship
- Irish: Craobh Idirmhéanach Peile Chlub Laighean
- Founded: 2003
- Region: Leinster (GAA)
- Title holders: Sallins (1st title)
- First winner: Dundalk Gaels
- Most titles: No team has won more than once
- Sponsors: Allied Irish Banks

The Leinster Intermediate Club Football Championship, known for sponsorship reasons as the AIB Leinster Intermediate Club Football Championship and shortened to Leinster Club IFC, is an annual Gaelic football tournament played between the Intermediate football champions of the 12 counties of Leinster. The winners will represent the province in the semi-final of the All-Ireland Intermediate Club Football Championship.

== Top winners ==
	Team	County	Wins	Years won
1
1	Sallins	Kildare	1	2025
1	Caragh	Kildare	1	2024
1	Allenwood	Kildare	1	2023
1	Fethard St Mogues	Wexford	1	2022
1	Trim	Meath	1	2021
1	Mattock Rangers	Louth	1	2019
1	Two Mile House	Kildare	1	2018
1	Kilanerin–Ballyfad	Wexford	1	2017
1	St Colmcille's	Meath	1	2016
1	Ratoath	Meath	1	2015
1	Seán O'Mahony's	Louth	1	2014
1	Geraldines	Louth	1	2013
1	Monasterevin	Kildare	1	2012
1	Éire Óg Greystones	Wicklow	1	2011
1	Ballymore Eustace	Kildare	1	2010
1	Maynooth	Kildare	1	2009
1	Ballyroan Abbey	Laois	1	2008
1	Fingal Ravens	Dublin	1	2007
1	Confey	Kildare	1	2006
1	Crettyard	Laois	1	2005
1	Wolfe Tones	Meath	1	2004
1	Dundalk Gaels	Louth	1	2003

== Winners by county ==
	County	Clubs (Years Won)
8	Kildare	Sallins (2025) Caragh (2024)Allenwood (2023) Two Mile House (2018) Monasterevin (2012), Ballymore Eustace (2010), Maynooth (2009), Confey (2006)
4	Meath	Trim (2021), St Colmcille's (2016), Ratoath (2015), Wolfe Tones (2004)
4	Louth	Mattock Rangers (2019), Seán O'Mahonys (2014), Geraldines (2013), Dundalk Gaels (2003)
2	Wexford	Fethard St Mogues (2022), Kilanerin–Ballyfad (2017)
2	Laois	Ballyroan Abbey (2008), Crettyard (2005)
1
1	Wicklow	Éire Óg Greystones (2011)
1	Dublin	Fingal Ravens (2007)

No clubs from Westmeath, Carlow, Kilkenny, Offaly or Longford have won the Leinster Club IFC.

== Roll of honour ==
Year	Winner	County	Score	Opponent	County	Score
2025	Sallins	Kildare	2-11	Tubberclair	Westmeath	2-04
2024	Caragh	Kildare	0-13	Naomh Mearnóg	Dublin	0-08
2023	Allenwood	Kildare	4-12	Scoil Ui Chonaill	Dublin	3-05
2022	Fethard St Mogues	Wexford	1-15	Dunshaughlin	Meath	2-11
2021	Trim	Meath	1-15	Clara	Offaly	2-08
2020	No competition due to the impact of the COVID-19 pandemic on Gaelic games					
2019	Mattock Rangers	Louth	1-14	Mullinavat	Kilkenny	0-11
2018	Two Mile House	Kildare	1-08	Shamrocks	Offaly	0-10
2017	Kilanerin–Ballyfad	Wexford	0-13	Ballyboughal	Dublin	0-11
2016	St Colmcille' s	Meath	0-13	Rosemount	Westmeath	1-08
2015	Ratoath	Meath	2-13	Athlone	Westmeath	2-09
2014	Seán O'Mahony's	Louth	0-10	Ballinlough	Meath	1-04
2013	Geraldines	Louth	2-09, 0-13 (R)	St Olaf's	Dublin	1-12, 0-09 (R)
2012	Monasterevin	Kildare	0-04	O'Connell's	Louth	0-03
2011	Éire Óg Greystones	Wicklow	0-08	Confey	Kildare	0-06
2010	Ballymore Eustace	Kildare	0-12	Nobber	Meath	0-10
2009	Maynooth	Kildare	1-08	Tubberclair	Westmeath	0-08
2008	Ballyroan Abbey	Laois	2-08	St Ultans	Meath	0-08
2007	Fingal Ravens	Dublin	1-09	Donaghmore-Ashbourne	Meath	0-09
2006	Confey	Kildare	3-07	Tubber	Offaly	1-08
2005	Crettyard	Laois	0-13	Rathcline	Longford	1-08
2004	Wolfe Tones	Meath	1-10	Naas	Kildare	0-08
2003	Dundalk Gaels	Louth	2-05	Arles/Killeen	Laois	0-07

== See also ==
- Munster Intermediate Club Football Championship
- Ulster Intermediate Club Football Championship
- Connacht Intermediate Club Football Championship
