= 2003–04 All-Ireland Intermediate Club Football Championship =

Irish Gaelic football competition

- Sponsor: Allied Irish Bank
- Champions: Ilen Rovers (1st title); Kieran Daly (captain); Dave Evans (manager)
- Runners-up: St. Michael's; Brian McLaughlin (captain); Danny Lafferty (manager)

The 2003–04 All-Ireland Intermediate Club Football Championship was the inaugural staging of the All-Ireland Intermediate Club Football Championship since its establishment by the Gaelic Athletic Association.

The All-Ireland final was played on 25 April 2004 at Páirc Mhearnóg in Portmarnock, between Ilen Rovers and St. Michael's. Ilen Rovers won the match by 1-11 to 1-04 to claim their first ever championship title.

== All-Ireland Intermediate Club Football Championship ==
=== All-Ireland semi-finals ===
28 March 2004 Semi-final	Ilen Rovers	2-09 - 1-07	Elphin	O'Garney Park

6 April 2004 Semi-final	St Michael's	1-12 - 1-07	Dundalk Gaels	Páirc Uí Néill

=== All-Ireland final ===
25 April 2004 Final	Ilen Rovers	1-11 - 1-04	St Michael's	Páirc Mhearnóg
	K O’Sullivan (1-7, 1-6 frees), K Daly (0-2), F Collins, B O’Sullivan (0-1 each).		S Stewart (1-0), B McLoughlin (0-2, 0-1 free), S Coyle, C Toye (0-1 each).	Referee: S Farrell (Dublin)
