= 2025 Roscommon Senior Hurling Championship =

- Dates: Jul 4 - Sep 28 2025
- Teams: 7
- Sponsor: Kepak
- Champions: Four Roads (38th title); Connor Coyle & Jack Donnelly (captain); Micheál Kelly (manager)
- Runners-up: Oran; Shane Keane (captain); Francie Quine (manager)

Tournament statistics
- Matches played: 19
- Goals scored: 60 (3.16 per match)
- Points scored: 698 (36.74 per match)

The 2025 Roscommon Senior Hurling Championship was the 110th staging of the Roscommon Senior Hurling Championship, since its inception in 1902.

A total of seven teams contested the championship. Four Roads entered as defending champions, defeating St Dominic's 3-12 - 2-11 in 2024 Roscommon Senior Hurling Championship. Athleague, Oran, Pádraig Pearse's, Roscommon Gaels, and Tremane round out the field.

All seven clubs enter the group stage, playing four games each over five rounds for seeding. Four Roads and Oran got a bye to the semi-finals with a top-two finish. St Dominic's, Roscommon Gaels, Pádraig Pearse's, and Athleague qualified for the quarter-finals with a top-six finish. Tremane was eliminated.

The final was held on September 28 between Four Roads and Oran at Dr Hyde Park in Roscommon. The winners will represent Roscommon in the Connacht Intermediate Club Hurling Championship. Four Roads won the contest 2-18 - 0-15 to successively retain their title, winning four straight and a record 38th time.

== Teams ==
=== 2025 Teams ===
The 7 teams who competed in the 2025 Roscommon Senior Hurling Championship were:

Team	Location	Position in 2024	Championship titles	Last championship title
Athleague	Athleague	Semi-finals	20	2021
Four Roads	Four Roads	Champions	37	2024
Oran	Oran	Quarter-finals	6	2016
Pádraig Pearse's	Woodmount	Group stage	4	2020
Roscommon Gaels	Roscommon	Semi-finals	24	1970
St Dominic's	Knockcroghery	Runners-up	3	1999
Tremane	Knockadangan	Quarter-finals	11	1995

== Group stage ==
Advance to Semi-Finals Advance to Quarter-Finals

Team	Matches				Score			Pts
Team	Pld	W	D	L	For	Against	Diff	Pts
Four Roads	4	4	0	0	83	69	14	8
Oran	4	2	1	1	76	77	-1	5
St Dominic's	4	2	0	2	72	67	5	4
Roscommon Gaels	4	2	0	2	67	65	2	4
Pádraig Pearse's	4	2	0	2	70	70	0	4
Athleague	4	1	1	2	78	87	-9	3
Tremane	4	0	0	4	67	78	-11	0

=== Fixtures ===
Jul 4 Round 1	Roscommon Gaels	1-12 - 1-14	Four Roads	Lisnamult
				Referee: Aaron Clogher

Jul 4 Round 1	Athleague	2-14 - 2-10	Tremane	Creggs GAA Pitch
				Referee: John Rogerson

Jul 4 Round 1	St Dominic's	3-7 - 0-11	Pádraig Pearse's	Knockcroghery
				Referee: Matthew Farrell

Jul 13 Round 2	Athleague	1-18 - 3-12	Oran	Ballyforan
				Referee: Larry Tiernan

Jul 13 Round 2	St Dominic's	3-10 - 2-15	Four Roads	Ballyforan
				Referee: James Judge

Jul 13 Round 2	Roscommon Gaels	0-20 - 1-11	Pádraig Pearse's	Ballyforan
				Referee: Francis Kelly

Jul 26 Round 3	Athleague	0-16 - 2-19	Pádraig Pearse's	Mulhern Park, Fuerty
				Referee: Larry Tiernan

Jul 26 Round 3	St Dominic's	2-11 - 0-12	Roscommon Gaels	Knockcroghery
				Referee: Aaron Clogher

Jul 27 Round 3	Oran	0-18 - 2-10	Tremane	Rockfield
				Referee: John Rogerson

Aug 10 Round 4	Athleague	3-12 - 4-13	Four Roads	Woodmount
				Referee: Fergus Halligan

Aug 10 Round 4	St Dominic's	2-14 - 0-23	Oran	Woodmount
				Referee: Francis Kelly

Aug 10 Round 4	Tremane	2-12 - 1-17	Pádraig Pearse's	Woodmount
				Referee: Larry Tiernan

Aug 24 Round 5	Oran	0-14 - 2-14	Four Roads	Lisnamult
				Referee: Aaron Cloghan

Aug 24 Round 5	Roscommon Gaels	1-17 - 3-8	Tremane	Lisnamult
				Referee: John Rogerson

== Knockout stage ==
=== Fixtures ===
Sep 7 Quarter-Final	Roscommon Gaels	0-9 - 1-16	Pádraig Pearse's	Ballyforan
				Referee: Francis Kelly

Sep 7 Quarter-Final	St Dominic's	3-20 - 1-12	Athleague	Ballyforan
				Referee: Aaron Clogher

Sep 14 Semi-Final	Oran	1-14 - 1-12	St Dominic's	Ballyforan
				Referee: John Rogerson

Sep 14 Semi-Final	Four Roads	3-15 - 1-15	Pádraig Pearse's	Kiltoom
				Referee: Matthew Farrell

Sep 28 Final	Four Roads	2-18 - 0-15	Oran	Dr Hyde Park
	Conor Morris (2-5), Conor Mulry (0-6), Conor Kelly (0-2), Liam Óg Coyle (0-2), James Cunniffe (0-1), Noel Fallon (0-1), Tommy Morris (0-1)	Report	Paddy Fallon (0-8), Cathal Kenny (0-2), Gary Concannon (0-1), Eoghan Grady (0-1), Joe Henry (0-1), Micheál Hussey (0-1), David McDermott (0-1)	Referee: Francis Kelly (Tremane)
