= 2008 Roscommon Senior Hurling Championship =

The 2008 Senior Hurling Championship in Roscommon.

== Table ==
Team	Played	Won	Lost	Drawn	For	Against	Points
Padraig Pearses	6	6	0	0	32	23	12
Four Roads	6	5	1	0	41	32	10
Tremane	5	3	2	0	32	24	6
Athleague	5	2	3	0	35	35	3
Roscommon Gaels	5	1	3	1	36	34	3
Oran	5	1	4	0	27	48	2
St Dominics	6	0	5	1	28	35	1

== Matches ==
=== Weekend of 18 May ===
17 May 2008	Roscommon Gaels	0-09 - 1-07	Tremane	Roscommon
				Stadium: Dr Hyde Park

17 May 2008	Four Roads	0-14 - 1-08	Athleague	Roscommon
				Stadium: Dr Hyde Park

17 May 2008	Padraig Pearses	2-13 - 1-08	Oran	Roscommon
				Stadium: Dr Hyde Park

=== Weekend of 25 May ===
25 May 2008	St Dominics	2-07 - 1-10	Roscommon Gaels	Woodmount
				Stadium: Pairc an Piarsaigh

25 May 2008	Athleague	3-05 - 1-04	Oran	Woodmount
				Stadium: Pairc an Piarsaigh

25 May 2008	Four Roads	1-09 - 1-10	Padraig Pearses	Woodmount
				Stadium: Pairc an Piarsaigh

=== Weekend of 1 June ===
1 June 2008	St Dominics	3-06 - 2-16	Tremane	Knockcroghery
				Stadium: Saint Dominic's GAA park

1 June 2008	Four Roads	1-12 - 1-06	Oran	Four Roads

1 June 2008	Athleague	0-11 - 0-14	Roscommon Gaels	Roscommon
				Stadium: Dr Hyde Park

=== 10 August ===
10 August 2008	St Dominics	v	Oran	Knockcroghery
				Stadium: Saint Dominic's GAA park

10 August 2008	Four Roads	v	Roscommon Gaels	Four Roads

10 August 2008	Padraig Pearses	0-17 - 0-07	Tremane	Woodmount
				Stadium: Pairc an Piarsaigh

=== 17 August ===
17 August 2008	Athleague	1-10 - 2-13	Padraig Pearses	Athleague
				Stadium: Waldron Park

17 August 2008	Four Roads	1-16 - 1-06	St Dominics	Four Roads

17 August 2008	Oran	2-07 - 2-08	Tremane	Oran
				Stadium: Rockfield

=== 31 August ===
31 August 2008	St Dominics	2-05 - 2-12	Athleague	Knockcroghery
				Stadium: Saint Dominic's GAA park

31 August 2008	Padraig Pearses	1-14 - 1-09	Roscommon Gaels	Woodmount
				Stadium: Pairc an Piarsaigh

31 August 2008	Four Roads	2-18 - 2-06	Tremane	Four Roads

=== 14 September ===
14 September 2008	Roscommon Gaels	v	Oran	Roscommon
				Stadium: Dr Hyde Park

14 September 2008	Athleague	v	Tremane	Athleague
				Stadium: Waldron Park

14th September 2008	St Dominics	v	Padraig Pearses	Knockcroghery
				Stadium: Saint Dominic's GAA park
