= Ó Chlúmháin =

Family name

Ó Cluanáin was the name of a brehon family from what is now County Galway - MacLysaght calls it "Essentially a Co. Galway name."

Joseph Mannion notes that in 1551 one Nicholas O Clowan, an official of Tuam, was granted custody of the Franciscan friary at Clonkeenkerrill, County Galway. A townland in the area, now called Colmanstown, was originally Baile Uí Chlúmháin. The poet Antoine Ó Raifteiri (1784–1835) died at the house of a Diarmaid Cloonan, beside Killeenen church and graveyard, where he was buried. This is situated on the north bank of Rahasane turlough, in the parish of Craughwell.

In the early medieval era members of the family spread into what is now County Mayo and County Sligo. It is found in all three counties as Cloonan.

== See also ==
- Gilla Aenghus Ua Chlúmháin, poet, died 1143
- Aindileas Ua Chlúmháin, poet, died 1170
- Caoch Ceise Ó Chlúmháin, poet, fl. 14th century
- Jarlath Cloonan, Galway Senior Hurling Manager 1994–1998.
- Eugene Cloonan - player with the Galway hurling team.
