= Gerry O'Malley (Gaelic footballer) =

Irish Gaelic footballer and hurler

Personal information
- Native name: Gearóid Ó Máille (Irish)
- Born: 1928 Brideswell, County Roscommon, Ireland
- Died: 5 January 2016 (aged 87) Blanchardstown, Dublin, Ireland
- Occupation: Agricultural advisor

Sport
- Sport: Gaelic football
- Position: Centre-back
Clubs
- Years: Club
- Four Roads; St Patrick's; St Brigid's
Club titles
	Football	Hurling
Roscommon titles	4	7
Inter-county
- Years: County
- 1947–1964: Roscommon
Inter-county titles
- Connacht titles: 4
- All-Irelands: 0
- NFL: 0

Gerald "Gerry" O'Malley (1928 – 5 January 2016) was an Irish Gaelic footballer who played as a centre-back for the Roscommon senior team.

Born in Brideswell, County Roscommon, O'Malley was introduced to Gaelic games during his schooling at Brideswell National School and the Marist College. At club level he first lined out as a minor dual player with Four Roads. In a career spanning over twenty years, O'Malley won seven championship medals as a hurler. As a Gaelic footballer he later moved to the St Patrick's club before winning four championship medals with St Brigid's.

O'Malley made his debut on the inter-county scene when he first linked up with the Roscommon junior teams as a dual player. An All-Ireland medallist with the hurling team at the end of his career, O'Malley made his senior football debut during the 1947–48 league. He went on to play a key role for Roscommon during a hugely successful era, and won four Connacht SFC medals. He was an All-Ireland SFC runner-up on one occasion.

As a member of the Connacht inter-provincial teams in both codes, he won three Railway Cup medals as a footballer. O'Malley retired from inter-county football following the conclusion of the 1964 championship.

Immediately after his retirement from club activity, O'Malley took charge of the St Brigid's senior team, guiding them to the championship title in 1969. Between 1970 and 1971 he trained those Roscommon inter-county footballers who were based in Dublin. The following year O'Malley trained St Maur's to junior and intermediate championship successes.
