= Phelim Murray =

Irish Gaelic footballer

Personal information
- Native name: Féilim Ó Muirí (Irish)
- Born: 1922 Knockcroghery, County Roscommon, Ireland
- Died: 25 May 2005 (aged 82) Dublin, Ireland
- Occupation: Engineer

Sport
- Sport: Gaelic football
- Position: Midfield
Club
- Years: Club
- St. Patrick's
Club titles
- Roscommon titles: 6
College
- Years: College
- University College Dublin
College titles
- Sigerson titles: 1
Inter-county
- Years: County
- 1942-1948: Roscommon
Inter-county titles
- Connacht titles: 4
- All-Irelands: 2
- NFL: 0

Phelim A. Murray (1922 – 25 May 2005) was an Irish Gaelic footballer who played as a midfielder for the Roscommon senior team.

Born in Knockcroghery, County Roscommon, Murray was introduced to Gaelic football during his schooling at Roscommon CBS. A two-time Connacht medalist he also enjoyed All-Ireland successes at inter-provincial level. At club level Murray first lined out as a minor with St. Patrick's. In a distinguished career he won six championship medals.

Murray made his debut on the inter-county scene when he first linked up with the Roscommon minor team. An All-Ireland medallist in this grade, Murray later claimed an All-Ireland medal as a non-playing substitute with the junior team before joining the senior team. He went on to play a key role for Roscommon during a hugely successful era, and won two All-Ireland medals and four Connacht medals. He was an All-Ireland runner-up on one occasion.

As a member of the Connacht inter-provincial team on a number of occasions, Murray never won a Railway Cup medal. He retired from inter-county football following the conclusion of the 1948 championship.

His brother, Jimmy Murray, was an All-Ireland-winning captain with Roscommon.

== Honours ==
Elphin

- Roscommon Senior Football Championship (6): 1941, 1942, 1944, 1945, 1947, 1948

University College Dublin

- Sigerson Cup (1): 1945

Roscommon

- All-Ireland Senior Football Championship (2): 1943, 1944
- Connacht Senior Football Championship (4): 1943, 1944, 1946, 1947
- All-Ireland Junior Football Championship (1): 1940 (sub)
- Connacht Junior Football Championship (1): 1940 (sub)
- All-Ireland Minor Football Championship (1): 1939
- Connacht Minor Football Championship (1): 1939
