= Cloonan =

Cloonan is a surname. Notable people with the surname include:

- Becky Cloonan (born 1980), American comic book creator
- Diarmuid Cloonan (born 1980), Irish hurler, brother of Eugene
- Eugene Cloonan (born 1978), Irish hurler
- Jarlath Cloonan (born 1953), Irish hurler
