= Oran Hurling Club =

Gaelic games club in County Roscommon, Ireland

- Uarain
- Founded: 1965
- County: Roscommon
- Nickname: Oran
- Colours: Green And Yellow
- Grounds: Rockfield
- Coordinates: 53°39′35″N 8°16′34″W

Playing kits
Standard colours

Senior Club Championships
	All Ireland	Connacht champions	Roscommon champions
Hurling:	-	-	6

Oran Hurling Club (Irish: Uarain) is a Gaelic Athletic Association club located in the parishes of Oran in mid County Roscommon, Ireland. They club, which plays in Green and Yellow colours, fields underage teams from U-12 to U-21 as well as Senior and Junior teams. In 2016, the club won their sixth Roscommon Senior Hurling Championship title. Their home pitch is in Clooneenbaun townland. Oran Football GAA club is based at the same ground.

== History ==
The club was founded in 1965 when Junior and Underage sections were formed by two local schoolteachers. A Senior team was formed in 1983.

Between 1987 and 1992, the club reached five Roscommon Senior Hurling Championship finals and had three victories. Over the following decade, the club reached the county final several times - winning one in 1998. In 2004, the club won its fifth county final.

In 2016, Oran won its sixth county title. The final, played on 29 October 2016, was against Four Roads. In the last minute of stoppage time, Oran trailed by a point. Oran had just earned a free on their own 21 yard line. Against a 50 km wind, Jerry Fallon scored a point. The game was drawn and extra time ensued. Right from the off, Oran scored 2 goals and 3 points against Four Roads. Oran led by 9 points and had made a 10-point turn around since Four Roads last score. The 8 in a row champions were denied their ninth trophy by the Oran side.

The club again reached the final during the 2025 Roscommon Senior Hurling Championship, but were defeated by Four Roads on a scoreline of 2-18 to 0-15.

== Honours ==
- Roscommon Senior Hurling Championships (6): 1989, 1990, 1992, 1998, 2004, 2016
- Roscommon Senior Hurling League (1): 2009
- Connacht Junior Club Hurling Championship (1): 2004
- All-Ireland Junior Club Hurling Championship (0): (runners-up in 2005)
- Roscommon Minor Hurling Championship (1): 2004
