= Jimmy Murray (Gaelic footballer) =

Irish hurler and Gaelic footballer

Personal information
- Native name: Séamus Ó Muirí (Irish)
- Born: 5 May 1917 Knockcroghery, County Roscommon
- Died: 23 January 2007 (aged 89)
- Occupation: Publican

Sport
- Sport: Gaelic football
- Position: Centre-forward
Club
- Years: Club
- 1930s-1950s: St Patrick's
Club titles
- Roscommon titles: 6 (F) 1(H)
Inter-county
- Years: County
- 1936-1940s: Roscommon
Inter-county titles
- Connacht titles: 4
- All-Irelands: 2
- NFL: 0

Jimmy Murray (5 May 1917 – 23 January 2007) was an Irish sportsperson who played Gaelic football with Roscommon in the 1940s.

== Early & private life ==
Jimmy Murray was born to John and Susan (née Walls) Murray in 1917. His mother, a native of Magherafelt, County Londonderry, was a teacher and his father ran a grocery shop and pub. Murray grew up in Knockcroghery, County Roscommon and was educated at the local national school, at Harrison Hall technical school and the De La Salle Brothers school in Roscommon. From an early age he was a Gaelic football fanatic and showed great skill at his favourite game. Murray was married to Ann Costello from Headford, County Galway. The couple had five children. She died in 1992. Murray was a publican by profession.

Away from the field of play, he was a lover of music, especially famous tenors such as Athlone's John McCormack and Mario Lanza. His party piece was "The West's Awake" and the song became the title of a charity CD he produced in 2003 - a recording debutant at the age of 85.Jimmy himself inspired a tune ("Famous Jimmy Murray")recorded by Welsh folk band Allan Yn Y Fan.

== Playing career ==
=== Club ===
Murray had great success as a club footballer. He played with his local St Patrick's club in Knockcroghery, as well as hurling with Roscommon Gaels. In all he won six Roscommon SFC in 1942, 1943, 1945, 1946, 1948 and 1949. Murray was also a hurler of note and he won a Roscommon SHC medal with the Gaels club in 1938.

=== Inter-county ===
Murray's hugely successful inter-county career began in 1939. That year he played on a Roscommon team that defeated Limerick in the All-Ireland junior football semi-final, only to lose to Dublin in the final. A year later Roscommon returned to win the final with a comprehensive triumph over Westmeath. The stock of Roscommon football was on the rise and more experienced players like Jimmy Murray, Dr Donal Keenan (later to serve as president of the GAA), Owensie Hoare and Hugh Gibbons looked forward to the arrival on the senior team of the young players who won All-Ireland minor titles for the county in 1939 and 1941.

The senior breakthrough came in 1943 when Roscommon defeated Galway in the Connacht final, a victory that Jimmy Murray later described as "our greatest victory until that point". They went on to beat Louth in the All-Ireland semi-final and captured their first senior All-Ireland title with a 2-7 to 2-2 win over Cavan. Murray’s performance in this match was his finest hour - he had taken Roscommon from oblivion to the All-Ireland title. His brother Phelim also played on that team, and again in 1944, when Roscommon defeated the traditional powerhouses of the game, Kerry, to add a second title. They were among the select few sets of brothers to play together in and win All-Ireland titles. In 1946, Roscommon came tantalisingly close to adding a third title, however, in the All-Ireland final against Kerry, Murray sustained a broken nose, but came back on to the field to almost score a late winning point. Kerry won the day by 2-8 to 0-10.

As a Gaelic footballer, Jimmy Murray was a centre forward who possessed a relatively small stature. Today his name is cited in Roscommon and national Gaelic Athletic Association circles as a man to be emulated.

== Records ==
Murray is regarded as one of the Gaelic Athletic Association's most decorated Gaelic footballers. The Knockcroghery man is one of only eight captains to lift the Sam Maguire Cup twice. The other seven captains are Declan O'Sullivan and Joe Barrett of Kerry, J. J. O'Reilly of Cavan, Seán Flanagan of Mayo, Enda Colleran of Galway, Tony Hanahoe of Dublin and Brian Dooher of Tyrone. Murray was also the only Roscommon man ever to captain the county to ultimate glory. He was the first man ever to captain a team to back-to-back All-Ireland senior football wins and until Stephen Cluxton of Dublin came along he had the distinction of being the only captain to have led a team in five separate All-Ireland senior final match appearances (1943, 1943 replay, 1944, 1946, 1946 replay). In recognition of his skills and long-running contribution to the sport, Murray was awarded the 1993 All-Time All Star Award as no GAA All Stars Awards were being issued at the time of his playing career.

== Retirement ==
In November 2003 Jimmy recorded an album "The West's Awake" in his pub in Knockroghery. The proceeds went to Lean ar Aghaidh Resource Centre, Roscommon, for Children with Special Needs. In November 2005 he signed a Limited Edition photo of himself with the Sam Maguire Cup (All Ireland Senior Football Cup) to raise funds for the International Relief and Development Agency GOAL. In October 2006 members of the Roscommon minor football team stopped at Murray's pub in Knockcroghery as they transported the All-Ireland minor trophy (Tom Markham Cup) back to the county after defeating Kerry in a replay. "It was a very emotional moment. He was old and feeble, but it meant so much to the players to meet Jimmy," said a Roscommon county board official who witnessed the meeting.

Jimmy Murray died peacefully on 23 January 2007. At the age of 89 he was the oldest surviving double All-Ireland winning captain.

Sporting positions
Preceded by	Roscommon Senior Football Captain; 1943-1944	Succeeded by
Achievements
Preceded by Joe Fitzgerald (Dublin)	All-Ireland SFC winning captain 1943–1944	Succeeded by Tadhgo Crowley (Cork)
