= Taghmaconnell =

Village in County Roscommon, Ireland

Coordinates: 53°24′29″N 8°8′50″W

Taghmaconnell / Taughmaconnell Teach Mhic Conaill
- Village
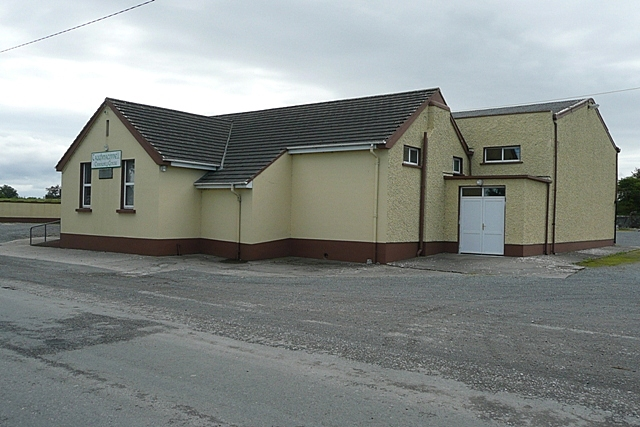
- Taghmaconnell community centre in 2008
- Interactive map of Taghmaconnell / Taughmaconnell
- Country: Ireland
- Province: Connacht

Government
  - Type: Community Council
- Time zone: UTC±0 (WET)
  - Summer (DST): UTC+1 (IST)
- Website: taughmaconnell.ie

Taghmaconnell also known as Taughmaconnell (Irish: Teach Mhic Conaill, meaning 'MacConaill's house'), is a small village in County Roscommon, Ireland. It is situated between Athlone and Ballinasloe. The village lends its name to the parish and civil parish in which it is located.

The local economy is predominantly based on agriculture, with many residents being farmers. Additionally, some villagers work in large factories and government offices in the nearby towns. The village has one of the lowest crime rates in the country.

Athlone is 14 km (9 mi) to the east, and Ballinasloe 10 km (6 mi) to the south-west. There are castle ruins to be seen in Castlesampson, Clonbigney and Dundonnell.

== Religion ==
The local church in Taghmaconnell is dedicated to Saint Ronan, who also had connections with the Aran Islands and Clonmacnoise. The important focal points within the parish include Saint Ronan’s Well, the National School, and the Church, all depicted on the parish banner. The current Parish Priest is Fr. Sean Neylon. The present church dates back to 1805, before this the church was built it seems that mass was celebrated in a big barn across the road in what used to be Costello's shop. The first building on the present site was erected in 1805 on land donated by Brabazon Newcomen.

In 1860 a new church was built out of the foundations of the 1805 one. In 1961 major work was done on the church. The mortuary was built and the front door was set in. Wooden statues that were found under the altar during this renovation certainly came from Clontuskert Priory. They are now in the Diocesan Museum beside the Cathedral in Loughrea. All date back to 1200 to 1300 AD.

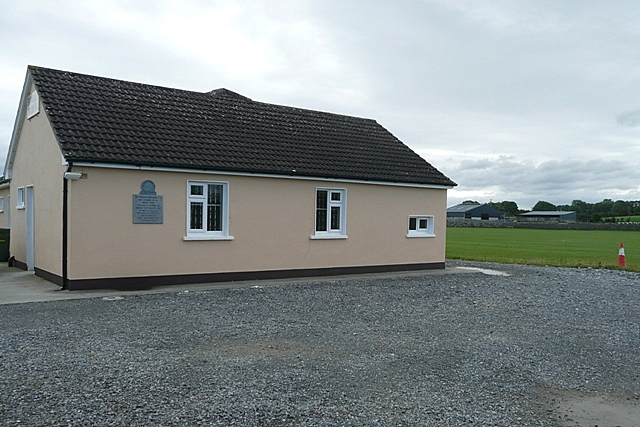
Local Soccer Pitch, Sky valley Rovers

St Ronan’s well is situated in the townland of Shraduff in Taughmaconnell. Mass is celebrated at the well annually on 21 June, the summer solstice. According to local tradition, Saint Ronan, on his way from Aran to Clonmacnoise, stopped at the spring well for a drink. A woman with a blind child was present at the well. Saint Ronan blessed the well and anointed the child’s eye with its water, miraculously restoring the child's sight.

== Education ==
Taughmaconnell currently has two primary schools, one in Taughmaconnell and one in Castlesampson. At present there are four teachers in Taughmaconnell and two teachers in Castlesampson.

Tríona Mc Loughlin is the current principal of Taughmaconnell NS and the school currently has 100 students, it is a Catholic school. Reports show the first school in Taughmaconnell was built in 1852 and the old school is dated 1901.

Mary Naughton is the current principal of Castlesampson NS and the school currently has 40 students, it is a Catholic school. Reports show the first school in Castlesampson was built in 1853 while the second came in 1881.

== Sport ==
- Soccer – The local soccer team is Skyvalley Rovers which plays in the Roscommon and District League. The club was founded in 1971 and plays at Onagh Park close to Chapel Street the natural parish centre. The team has won 8 league titles, 7 Roscommon Cups and 10 league cups/division cups. The grounds have two full sized pitches. The pitch is also used by St Ronan’s Athletic Club and the Taughmaconnell Community Games are held there every year.
- Gaelic Games – The local GAA team is Padraig Pearses GAA Roscommon which is located outside the parish at Woodmount, just off the main Athlone-Ballinasloe N6 road.
- Tug of War – The local Tug of War club was established in 2009 and is affiliated to the Irish Tug of War Association. The team trains at Cloonkeen. The team were runners up in the All-Ireland in 2012.

== Community Council ==
The Taughmaconnell Community Council is a local council that helps assist residents of the village. It is made up of 21 representatives from every part of the village.

== Notable residents ==
- John G. Downey – the seventh Governor of California from 1860 to 1862 and namesake of Downey, California – was born in Castlesampson, Taughmaconnell in 1827.
- Brendan Shine, folk and country singer

== See also ==
- List of towns and villages in Ireland
