= Mark Miley =

Irish hurler and Gaelic footballer

Personal information
- Born: Knockcroghery

Sport
- Football Position: Goalkeeper
- Hurling Position: Forward
Clubs
- Years: Club
- St Dominic's (F); St Dominic's (H)
Club titles
	Football	Hurling
Roscommon titles	0	0
Connacht titles	0	
Inter-county
- Years: County
- Roscommon (H); Roscommon (F)
Inter-county titles
	Football	Hurling
Connacht Titles	0	0
All-Ireland Titles	0	0
League titles	0	0
All-Stars	0	0

Mark Miley is a dual player from County Roscommon, Ireland. He plays both Gaelic football and hurling with his club St Dominic's, of Knockroghery. At minor level, he played in goal for the Roscommon team that won the All-Ireland Minor Football Championship in 2006. After minor level, he went on to play at junior level for Roscommon footballers, where he won a Connacht Junior Football Championship in 2009.

In hurling he plays in the forwards and won All Ireland B medals at Under 21 level.
