= Roscommon Senior Hurling Championship =

- Current season or competition: 2025 Roscommon Senior Hurling Championship
- Code: Hurling
- Founded: 1902
- Region: Roscommon (GAA)
- Trophy: Mickey Cunniffe Cup
- No. of teams: 7
- Title holders: Four Roads (39th title)
- Most titles: Four Roads (39 titles)

The Roscommon Senior Hurling Championship is an annual Gaelic Athletic Association competition organised by Roscommon GAA among the top hurling clubs in County Roscommon, Ireland. Since 2008, the champions qualify to the Connacht Intermediate Club Hurling Championship, the winner of which progresses to the All-Ireland Intermediate Club Hurling Championship. Before 2008, the Roscommon champions qualified for the Connacht Senior Club Hurling Championship.

Four Roads are the title holders, defeating St Dominic's by 1-14 to 2-10 in the 2026 final.

== History ==
Four Roads lead the Roll of Honour with 39 titles, followed by Roscommon Gaels with 24 titles (last won in 1970). In the past Roscommon Gaels competed as St Coman's and Roscommon Town, while St Dominic's previously competed as St Patrick's.

Ballygar (County Galway) participated in the championship from the 1920s, winning two titles in 1930 and 1985, before transferring back to Galway in 1994.

Castlefrench (County Galway) participated in the championship in the 1930's, winning one title in 1934. Castlefrench is part of Caltra parish but is very close to the village of Ballyforan

Since 1998, seven clubs compete in the championship, namely Athleague, Four Roads, Oran, Pádraig Pearse's, Roscommon Gaels, St Dominic's and Tremane.

== Format ==
=== Group stage ===
The 7 clubs start in one group stage. Over the course of the group stage, each team plays four matches against other teams in the group. This means that team do not play all other teams in the group. Two points are awarded for a win, one for a draw and zero for a loss. The teams are ranked in the group stage table by points gained, then scoring difference and then their head-to-head record. The top two teams qualify for the semi-finals and the next four teams qualify for the quarter-finals.

=== Knockout stage ===
Following the completion of the group stage, the teams from the group are ranked (1-7) in terms of points accumulated and scoring difference. The two top-ranking teams receive byes to separate semi-finals.

Quarter-finals: Teams designated 3-6 contest this round. Third place plays sixth place and fourth place plays fifth place The two winners from these two games advance to the semi-finals.

Semi-finals: The two quarter-final winners and teams designated 1-2 contest this round. The two winners from these two games advance to the final.

Final: The two semi-final winners contest the final. The winning team are declared champions.

=== Relegation ===
There is currently no relegation to the Roscommon Junior Hurling Championship in place.

== Qualification for subsequent competitions ==
At the end of the championship, the winning team qualify to the subsequent Connacht Intermediate Club Hurling Championship, the winner of which progresses to the All-Ireland Intermediate Club Hurling Championship.

== Teams ==
=== 2026 Teams ===
The 7 teams competing in the 2026 Roscommon Senior Hurling Championship were:

Team	Location	Position in 2026	Championship titles	Last championship title
Athleague	Athleague	Quarter-Finals	20	2021
Four Roads	Four Roads	Champions	39	2026
Oran	Oran	Semi-Finals	6	2016
Pádraig Pearse's	Woodmount	Semi-Finals	4	2020
Roscommon Gaels	Roscommon	Group stage	24	1970
St Dominic's	Knockcroghery	Runners-Up	3	1999
Tremane	Knockadangan	Semi-Finals	11	1995

=== Hurling Grades ===
Championship	Club
Senior
Senior	Athleague
Senior	Four Roads
Senior	Oran
Senior	Pádraig Pearse's
Senior	Roscommon Gaels
Senior	St Dominic's
Senior	Tremane
Junior
Junior	Athleague
Junior	Four Roads
Junior	Oran
Junior	Pádraig Pearse's
Junior	Roscommon Gaels
Junior	St Dominic's
Junior	Tremane

== Roll of honour ==
=== By club ===
#	Club	Titles	Runners-up	Championships won	Championships runner-up
1	Four Roads	39	22	1905, 1906, 1907, 1945, 1946, 1948, 1950, 1954, 1958, 1962, 1971, 1977, 1981, 1982, 1983, 1986, 1988, 1991, 1993, 1996, 1997, 2000, 2001, 2002, 2005, 2008, 2009, 2010, 2011, 2012, 2013, 2014, 2015, 2019, 2022, 2023, 2024, 2025, 2026	1947, 1949, 1952, 1953, 1955, 1956, 1960, 1963, 1968, 1969, 1970, 1973, 1975, 1984, 1989, 1990, 1992, 1994, 2004, 2016, 2017, 2018
2	Roscommon Gaels	24	2	1902, 1903, 1904, 1913, 1914, 1915, 1923, 1924, 1925, 1931, 1932, 1933, 1935, 1936, 1938, 1944, 1951, 1952, 1961, 1964, 1965, 1966, 1969, 1970	1962, 1972
3	Athleague	20	17	1908, 1909, 1910, 1916, 1928, 1929, 1937, 1947, 1949, 1953, 1955, 1957, 1959, 1975, 1978, 2003, 2006, 2007, 2018, 2021	1938, 1946, 1948, 1951, 1958, 1965, 1976, 1979, 1980, 1993, 2000, 2005, 2011, 2014, 2019, 2020, 2023
4	Tremane	11	11	1956, 1960, 1963, 1968, 1972, 1973, 1974, 1976, 1979, 1980, 1995	1959, 1961, 1964, 1967, 1977, 1978, 1981, 1985, 1986, 1996, 2021
5	Oran	6	7	1989, 1990, 1992, 1998, 2004, 2016	1987, 1991, 1999, 2003, 2009, 2013, 2025
6	Pádraig Pearse's	4	9	1984, 1987, 2017, 2020	1988, 2002, 2006, 2007, 2008, 2010, 2012, 2015, 2022
7	St Dominic's	3	6	1967, 1994, 1999	1995, 1997, 1998, 2001, 2024, 2026
8	Ballygar	2	2	1930, 1985	1982, 1983
9	Elphin	1	0	1926	—
9	Boyle (Military)	1	0	1927	—
9	Castlefrench	1	0	1934	—
12	St Patrick’s	0	3	—	1966, 1971, 1974
12	Castlerea	0	1	—	1934
12	Military (Athlone)	0	1	—	1935
12	St Coman's	0	1	—	1945

=== Notes ===
- Runners-up unknown: 1902–10, 1913–16, 1923–33, 1936–37, 1944, 1950, 1954, 1957

== List of finals ==
Year	Winners		Runners-up	
Year	Club	Score	Club	Score
2026	Four Roads	1-14	St Dominic's	2-10
2025	Four Roads	2-18	Oran	0-15
2024	Four Roads	3-12	St Dominic's	2-11
2023	Four Roads	0-26	Athleague	2-12
2022	Four Roads	3-14	Padraig Pearses	0-15
2021	Athleague	3-12	Tremane	0-15
2020	Padraig Pearses	2-22	Athleague	1-18
2019	Four Roads	1-19	Athleague	1-08
2018	Athleague	2-13	Four Roads	1-13
2017	Padraig Pearses	1-20	Four Roads	1-13
2016	Oran	3-08, 2-15 (R) AET	Four Roads	0-17, 1-12 (R)
2015	Four Roads	0-16, 0-17 (R)	Pádraig Pearse's	1-13, 1-11 (R)
2014	Four Roads	3-11	Athleague	0-11
2013	Four Roads	2-15	Oran	2-09
2012	Four Roads	0-16, 1-12 (R)	Pádraig Pearse's	1-13, 1-09 (R)
2011	Four Roads	1-14	Athleague	0-06
2010	Four Roads	5-15	Pádraig Pearse's	0-11
2009	Four Roads	2-15	Oran	2-04
2008	Four Roads	0-06	Pádraig Pearse's	0-05
2007	Athleague	2-11	Pádraig Pearse's	1-10
2006	Athleague	1-11	Pádraig Pearse's	1-06
2005	Four Roads	1-14	Athleague	2-09
2004	Oran	2-07	Four Roads	0-10
2003	Athleague	2-13	Oran	3-06
2002	Four Roads	2-08	Pádraig Pearse's	1-08
2001	Four Roads	1-16	St Dominic's	1-08
2000	Four Roads	1-11	Athleague	0-05
1999	St Dominic's	1-11	Oran	0-09
1998	Oran	2-10	St Dominic's	2-07
1997	Four Roads	1-15	St Dominic's	1-05
1996	Four Roads	2-19	Tremane	0-13
1995	Tremane	1-09, 2-11 (R)	St Dominic's	1-09, 0-09 (R)
1994	St Dominic's	2-05	Four Roads	1-06
1993	Four Roads	0-14	Athleague	0-10
1992	Oran	2-12	Four Roads	0-14
1991	Four Roads	2-12	Oran	2-07
1990	Oran	2-13	Four Roads	0-13
1989	Oran	3-08	Four Roads	1-05
1988	**Four Roads**	2-09	Pádraig Pearse's	1-05
1987	Pádraig Pearse's	2-05, 1-11 (R)	Oran	0-11, 1-06 (R)
1986	Four Roads	2-07	Tremane	0-10
1985	Ballygar	3-09	Tremane	2-06
1984	Pádraig Pearse's	1-07	Four Roads	2-03
1983	Four Roads	2-14	Ballygar	0-07
1982	Four Roads	0-10	Ballygar	0-07
1981	Four Roads	1-12, 1-13 (R)	Tremane	1-12, 1-08 (R)
1980	Tremane	1-10	Athleague	1-07
1979	Tremane	0-13	Athleague	0-03
1978	Athleague	2-08	Tremane	1-10
1977	**Four Roads**	2-14	Tremane	2-07
1976	**Tremane**	2-11	Athleague	2-04
1975	Athleague	2-08	Four Roads	1-10
1974	Tremane	2-12	St Patrick's	0-03
1973	Tremane	3-10	Four Roads	3-09
1972	Tremane	5-09	Roscommon Gaels	2-05
1971	Four Roads	3-03	St Patrick's	2-04
1970	Roscommon Gaels	2-08	Four Roads	2-02
1969	Roscommon Gaels	3-10	Four Roads	1-02
1968	Tremane	5-03	Four Roads	3-05
1967	St Patrick's	3-07	Tremane	2-05
1966	Roscommon Gaels	0-08	St Patrick's	0-03
1965	Roscommon Gaels		Athleague	
1964	Roscommon Gaels	1-08	Tremane	1-05
1963	Tremane	4-04	Four Roads	0-10
1962	Four Roads	4-03	Roscommon Gaels	1-03
1961	Roscommon Gaels	4-10	Tremane	5-05
1960	Tremane		Four Roads	
1959	Athleague		Tremane	
1958	Four Roads	3-05	Athleague	3-04
1957	Athleague			
1956	Tremane	2-08	Four Roads	2-04
1955	Athleague	3-06	Four Roads	1-05
1954	Four Roads			
1953	Athleague	7-00	Four Roads	3-04
1952	St Coman's	7-05	Four Roads	4-07
1951	St Coman's	4-02	Athleague	0-02
1950	Four Roads			
1949	Athleague		Four Roads	
1948	Four Roads		Athleague	
1947	Athleague (R)		Four Roads (R)	
1946	Four Roads		Athleague	
1945	Four Roads		St Coman's	
1944	St Coman's			
1943	No Championship			
1942	No Championship			
1941	No Championship			
1940	No Championship			
1939	No Championship			
1938	Roscommon Town	4-02	Athleague	2-00
1937	Athleague			
1936	Roscommon Town			
1935	Roscommon Town		Military (Athlone)	
1934	Castlefrench	3-04	Castlerea	0-04
1933	Roscommon Town			
1932	Roscommon Town			
1931	Roscommon Town			
1930	Ballygar			
1929	Athleague			
1928	Athleague			
1927	Boyle (Military)			
1926	Elphin			
1925	Roscommon Town			
1924	Roscommon Town			
1923	Roscommon Town			
1922	No Championship			
1921	No Championship			
1920	No Championship			
1919	No Championship			
1918	No Championship			
1917	No Championship			
1916	Athleague			
1915	Roscommon Town			
1914	Roscommon Town			
1913	Roscommon Town			
1912	No Championship			
1911	No Championship			
1910	Athleague			
1909	Athleague			
1908	Araghty Gaels (Athleague)			
1907	Tisara (Four Roads)			
1906	Tisara (Four Roads)			
1905	Tisara (Four Roads)			
1904	Gaels Roscommon			
1903	Gaels Roscommon			
1902	Gaels Roscommon			

- Bold indicates Connacht championship winners.

== See also ==
- Roscommon Senior Football Championship
- Connacht Intermediate Club Hurling Championship
