= Scregg House =

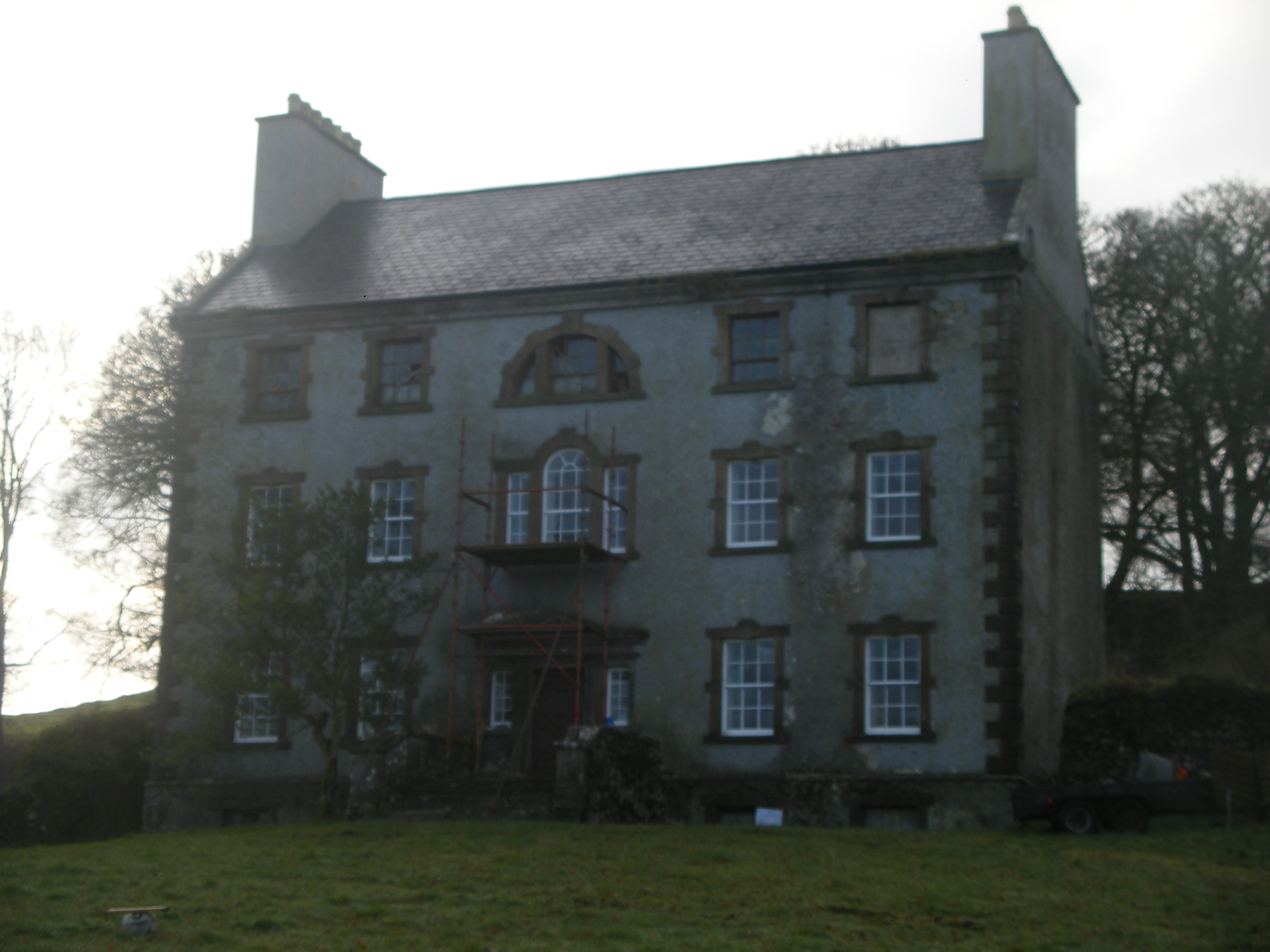
- Scregg House

- Location in Ireland

General information
- Location: Scregg, County Roscommon, Ireland
- Coordinates: 53°33′09″N 8°06′17″W
- Completed: 1769

Design and construction
- Developer: Edmund Kelly (1736-1802)

Scregg House is an 18th-century house in the townland of Scregg, south of Knockcroghery, in County Roscommon, Ireland. It was built in 1769 and occupied by J.E. Kelly in 1837 and Eliza Kelly in the 1850s. In a sale rental document of 1856, the house is described as a "respectable mansion, 3 stories high with basement and attic stories and a view of the Shannon River". Occupied in 1906 by the representatives of Henry Potts, the house is extant but no longer occupied. It is included on Roscommon County Council's Record of Protected Structures. Between 2007 and 2009, the Irish Georgian Society provided grant funding for repairs to the house's roof and windows.

== Architectural description ==
Detached five-bay three-storey over basement with attic storey former country house, built c.1750, no longer in use. Pitched slate roof with stone chimneystacks and cast-iron rainwater goods. Roughcast-rendered walls with limestone quoins and tooled limestone cornice. Square-headed window openings with timber sash windows, tooled limestone sills and block-and-start limestone surrounds. Diocletian window to second floor and Venetian window to first floor. Tooled limestone pedimented door surround with engaged Ionic columns with timber panelled door flanked by side lights. Door accessed up limestone steps. Two-storey stone outbuildings to west. Gabled coach house to west with the original Sheela na gigs inserted to gable.
