= Aindileas Ua Chlúmháin =

Aindileas Ua Chlúmháin (died 1170) was an Irish poet.

Aindileas was the son of Gilla Aenghus Ua Chlúmháin, ollamh of Connacht in poetry, who died in 1143.

No surviving poems by either are known to still exist, except perhaps anonymously. A later bearer of the name, who died in 1438, is listed as O'Clumain, Chief Poet to O'Hara, a Chief of the Name in County Sligo.

== See also ==
- Ó Chlúmháin

Preceded by Gilla Aenghus Ua Chlúmháin	Chief Poet of Connacht; 1143?–1170	Succeeded by Amlaid Ua Domhnalláin
