= Caoch Ceise Ó Clúmháin =

Gaelic-Irish poet

Caoch Ceise Ó Clúmháin, Gaelic-Irish poet, fl. 14th century.

Caoch Cise was a member of the Ó Chlúmháin family of Connacht. Lambert McKenna ascribes to him poem XVII in Leabhar Méig Shamhradháin, which praises Niall Mág Shamhradháin and his wife, Sadhbh Ní Conchobhair. The poem credits them with maintaining many poets and bards, also stating that the prince gets none of his princely renown without a princely portion accruing to Sadhbh.
