= Gilla Aenghus Ua Chlúmháin =

Gilla Aenghus Ua Chlúmháin (died 1143) was an Irish poet.

Gilla Aenghus Ua Chlúmháin, ollamh of Connacht in poetry, who died in 1143.

No surviving poems by him are known to still exist, except perhaps anonymously. A later bearer of the name, who died in 1438, is listed as O'Clumain, Chief Poet to O'Hara, a Chief of the Name in County Sligo. The name was later rendered as Ó Chlúmháin and Cloonan.

His son, Aindileas Ua Chlúmháin, was chief poet of Connacht upon his death in 1170.

Preceded by Feardana Ua Carthaigh	Chief Poet of Connacht; 1131?–1143	Succeeded by Aindileas Ua Chlúmháin
