= Connacht Senior Club Hurling Championship =

Annual hurling tournament in Ireland

- Irish: Craobh Sinsir Iománaíochta Connachta na gClub
- Founded: 1970
- No. of teams: 1
- Title holders: Portumna (4th title)
- Most titles: Athenry (8 titles)

The Connacht Senior Club Hurling Championship was an annual hurling tournament played between the senior hurling clubs in Connacht contested from 1970 until 2007 when it was discontinued due to a lack of meaningful opposition for the Galway champions. The Galway champions now qualify directly for the All-Ireland Senior Club Hurling Championship semi-final.

Throughout the competition's existence the Galway champions automatically qualified for the final. In 2007, the competition's final year, this competition was won by Portumna from Galway. The competition had long since become a formality for the Galway teams.

The Mayo and Roscommon champions now compete in the Connacht Intermediate Club Hurling Championship. Sligo and Leitrim champions participate in the Connacht Junior Club Hurling Championship, again with the Galway side entering the competition at the final stage.

== History ==
Given traditional lack of meaningful competition for Galway within the province, the competition was, save for a handful of occasions, a formality with one-sided games being the norm. Thus it was not taken seriously by many when considered in relation to the All-Ireland stage. While the competition was dominated by the Galway sides throughout its history, the title left the county three times in all, with Roscommon providing the winners on these occasions with Four Roads winning two titles in 1977 and 1988, while Tremane won their sole title in 1976. Tremane won their title courtesy of a shock win over Kiltormer on a scoreline of 2-7 to 1-9, and went on to play the well renowned Glen Rovers of Cork in the All-Ireland semi final.

Four Roads were awarded the 1977 championship as a result of Galway champions Kiltormer being handed a suspension by the Galway County Board for incidents which took place match involving the club when they were due to play in the decider. Four Roads went on to represent Connacht in that years All-Ireland semi final. Their second and final victory, won on the field of play, was a much more memorable occasion as the title was wrestled from the Galway champions Abbeyknockmoy at a time when Galway hurling was riding the crest of a wave, having just won back to back All-Ireland hurling titles in 1988. Like their previous All-Ireland semi final appearance, they were up against Wexford opposition, this time in the form of Buffers Alley, but lost out on a scoreline of 2-19 to 0-9.

Mayo side Toureen reached the final on numerous occasions, most recently in 1999 when they lost to eventual All-Ireland champions Athenry, while Ballina and Ballyhaunis made sole appearances for Mayo at the final stage. No Sligo or Leitrim side competed in a final throughout the competition's existence.

== Teams ==
=== Qualification ===
County	Championship	Qualifying Team
Galway	Galway Senior A Hurling Championship	Champion

=== 2024 teams ===
16 clubs will compete in the 2024 Connacht Senior Club Hurling Championship:

County	No.	Clubs competing in county championship
Galway	16	Ardrahan, Cappataggle, Castlegar, Clarinbridge, Craughwell, Gort, Kilconieron, Killimordaly, **Loughrea**, Moycullen, Mullagh, Oranmore-Maree, Sarsfields, St Thomas', Tommy Larkin's, Turloughmore

Note: Bold indicates title-holders.

== Roll of honour ==
=== By club ===
#	Club	Titles	Championships won
1	Athenry	8	1987, 1994, 1996, 1998, 1999, 2000, 2002, 2004
2	Sarsfields	7	1980, 1989, 1992, 1993, 1995, 1997, 2015
3	Castlegar	4	1972, 1973, 1979, 1984
4	Ardrahan	3	1974, 1975, 1978
4	Kiltormer	3	1982, 1990, 1991
4	Portumna	3	2003, 2005, 2007
7	Gort	2	1981, 1983
7	Four Roads	2	1977, 1988
9	Liam Mellows	1	1970
9	Tommy Larkin's	1	1971
9	Tremane	1	1976
9	Turloughmore	1	1985
9	Killimordaly	1	1986
9	Clarinbridge	1	2001
9	Loughrea	1	2006

=== By county ===
County	Titles	Runners-up	Total	Most recent success
Galway	35	3	38	2007
Roscommon	3	22	25	1988
Mayo	0	13	13	—

== List of finals ==
Year	Winners			Runners-up		
Year	County	Club	Score	County	Club	Score
2008–present	Galway champions represent the province					
2007	GAL	Portumna	6-23	MAY	Ballina	0-07
2006	GAL	Loughrea	2-16	ROS	Athleague	2-03
2005	GAL	Portumna	2-22	ROS	Four Roads	0-06
2004	GAL	Athenry	2-16	MAY	Ballyhaunis	0-07
2003	GAL	Portumna	0-17	ROS	Athleague	0-05
2002	GAL	Athenry	1-19	ROS	Four Roads	0-09
2001	GAL	Clarinbridge	2-18	ROS	Four Roads	1-06
2000	GAL	Athenry	2-16	ROS	Four Roads	1-07
1999	GAL	Athenry	1-13	MAY	Toureen	1-06
1998	GAL	Athenry	3-25	MAY	Tooreen	0-05
1997	GAL	Sarsfields	5-15	MAY	Tooreen	1-05
1996	GAL	Athenry	1-15	ROS	Four Roads	1-08
1995	GAL	Sarsfields	2-17	MAY	Tooreen	0-05
1994	GAL	Athenry	3-20	ROS	St Dominic's	2-03
1993	GAL	Sarsfield's	5-12	ROS	Four Roads	0-07
1992	GAL	Sarsfields	2-15	ROS	Oran	0-07
1991	GAL	Kiltormer	2-09	ROS	Four Roads	1-06
1990	GAL	Kiltormer	5-11	ROS	Oran	0-06
1989	GAL	Sarsfields	5-14	MAY	Tooreen	0-00
1988	ROS	Four Roads	3-05	GAL	Abbeyknockmoy	1-08
1987	GAL	Athenry	4-18	ROS	Pádraig Pearse's	0-07
1986	GAL	Killimordaly	6-16	MAY	Tooreen	1-04
1985	GAL	Turloughmore	1-08	ROS	Ballygar	2-04
1984	GAL	Castlegar	2-14	MAY	Tooreen	2-07
1983	GAL	Gort	3-13	MAY	Tooreen	1-05
1982	GAL	Kiltormer	3-14	ROS	Four Roads	0-06
1981	GAL	Gort	8-13	MAY	Tooreen	0-03
1980	GAL	Sarsfields	4-12	ROS	Tremane	0-05
1979	GAL	Castlegar	1-16	ROS	Tremane	1-09
1978	GAL	Ardrahan	2-09	MAY	Tooreen	1-07
1977	ROS	Four Roads	w/o	GAL	Kiltormer	(susp.)
1976	ROS	Tremane	2-07	GAL	Kiltormer	1-09
1975	GAL	Ardrahan	2-14	ROS	Athleague	1-04
1974	GAL	Ardrahan	9-12	MAY	Tooreen	1-06
1973	GAL	Castlegar	7-08	ROS	Tremane	1-07
1972	GAL	Castlegar	7-12	ROS	Tremane	2-07
1971	GAL	Tommy Larkin's	7-14	ROS	Four Roads	0-06
1970	GAL	Liam Mellows	4-10	ROS	Roscommon Gaels	2-05

== Records and statistics ==
=== By decade ===
The most successful team of each decade, judged by number of Connacht Championship titles, is as follows:

- 1970s: 3 each for Castlegar (1972-73-79) and Ardrahan (1974-75-78)
- 1980s: 2 each for Sarsfields (1980–89) and Gort (1981–83)
- 1990s: 4 each for Sarsfields (1992-93-95-97) and Athenry (1994-96-98-99)
- 2000s: 3 each for Athenry (2000-02-04) and Portumna (2003-05-07)

=== Gaps ===
Top three longest gaps between successive championship titles:

- 11 years: Four Roads (1977-1988)
- 9 years: Sarsfields (1980-1989)
- 8 years: Kiltormer (1982-1990)

=== Top scorers ===
==== Finals ====
Final	Top scorer	Team	Score	Total
1992	Peter Kelly	Sarsfields	2-00	6
1993	John Keane	Sarsfields	3-01	10
1994	Joe Rabbitte	Athenry	1-03	6
1994	Declan Higgins	Athenry	1-03	6
1995	Aidan Donohue	Sarsfields	1-05	8
1996	Cathal Moran	Athenry	0-06	6
1997	Joe Cooney	Sarsfields	2-03	9
1997	Aidan Donohue	Sarsfields	1-06	9
1998	Paschal Healy	Athenry	2-07	13
1999	Eugene Cloonan	Athenry	0-06	6
2000	Eugene Cloonan	Athenry	1-04	7
2000	Donal Moran	Athenry	0-07	7
2001	David Forde	Clarinbridge	1-02	5
2002	Eugene Cloonan	Athenry	0-08	9
2003	Frank Canning	Portumna	0-05	5
2004	Eugene Cloonan	Athenry	1-06	9
2005	Joe Canning	Portumna	1-09	12
2006	Michael Haverty	Loughrea	1-03	6
2007	Damien Hayes	Portumna	4-01	13

== See also ==
- Connacht Intermediate Club Hurling Championship (Tier 2)
- Connacht Junior Club Hurling Championship (Tier 3)
