= Tremane HC =

Gaelic games club in County Roscommon, Ireland

Tremane
- Tromaún
- Founded: 1945
- County: Roscommon
- Colours: Blue and Gold
- Grounds: Mote Park
- Coordinates: 53°34′43″N 8°12′18″W

Playing kits
Standard colours

Senior Club Championships
	All Ireland	Connacht champions	Roscommon champions
Hurling:	-	1	11

Tremane Hurling Club (Irish: Tromán, Tromaún) is a hurling club based northeast of Athleague, County Roscommon, Ireland. In 1976, the club won the Connacht Senior Club Hurling Championship with a shock victory over Galway side Kiltormer.

They play at Mote Park (named for the nearby big house) in the Knockadangan townland.

== Honours ==
- Connacht Senior Club Hurling Championship (1): 1976
- Roscommon Senior Hurling Championship (11): 1956, 1960, 1963, 1968, 1972, 1973, 1974, 1976, 1979, 1980, 1995
- Roscommon Junior Hurling Championship (4): 1949, 1953, 1955, 1956
- Roscommon Minor Hurling Championship (1): 1956
