= Padraig Pearses GAA Roscommon =

Irish sports club

Padraig Pearses GAA
- CLG Padraig Mac Phiarsaigh
- Founded: 1962
- County: Roscommon
- Nickname: Pearses Red Tigers (Juvenile teams)
- Colours: Red and White
- Grounds: Woodmount
- Coordinates: 53°20′14.95″N 8°09′15.07″W

Playing kits
Standard colours

Senior Club Championships
	All Ireland	Connacht champions	Roscommon champions
Football:	-	1	3
Hurling:	-	-	4

Padraig Pearses GAA Club (Irish: CLG Padraig Mac Phiarsaigh) is a Gaelic Athletic Association club located in the parishes of Moore, Taughmaconnell and Creagh in County Roscommon, Ireland. They play in red and white colours and their home pitch is at Woodmount (Ton na lig), Creagh.

The club was founded in 1962 and was an amalgamation of the two former junior clubs, Moore and Taughmaconnell. Initially only men's Gaelic football was played, with the playing of hurling restricted to the Creagh area of the club's catchment. Eventually the club grew to cater for all GAA field codes including Ladies Gaelic football and Camogie

Padraig Pearses fields underage teams in almost all codes from U-8 to U-21 as well as Senior and Junior teams, in addition the club is active in the GAA Cultural Competitions of Scór and Scor ná nÓg. Pearses Senior hurler won the 2017 Roscommon senior title for the first time in thirty years. The senior football team contested the Roscommon Senior Championship finals in 2015 and 2016 losing out on both days to Clan Na Gael and St Brigids. The senior football team won its first Roscommon Senior Championship final in 2019 defeating Roscommon Gaels on a scoreline of 2-10 to 1-10 and its second in 2021 defeating Clann na nGael on a scoreline of 2-08 to 0-11. That Team went on to win the club's first Connacht Senior Club Championship defeating Knockmore of Mayo by 1-13 to 1-11 in the final becoming only the 5th Roscommon club to hold a Senior Connacht title. The Senior Footballer's last won the Roscommon Championship in 2024 defeating Roscommon Gaels in the final.

The club has provided players to county teams in both hurling and football at all levels. Niall Carty was selected to captain the Roscommon senior footballers for 2014 and 2015.

== Grounds ==
Although formed in 1962, the club had no grounds of its own until 1983. Up until then the club played its official games at Ballyforan (St. Aidans GAA Club) or Johnstown (Clan Na Gael GAA Club). The club also used facilities such as Finneran's Field Taughmaconnell, Green's Field Moore, St Bridgets Hospital Grounds Creagh and the pitch at the rear of the then Falty National School now the home of Moore United Soccer Club.

However, after years of planning and fundraising, the club carried out a major development plan. The grounds at Woodmount were officially opened in 1984 by Dr. Donal Keenan, former President of the GAA and two time All-Ireland medal winner.

The original grounds consisted of one full size pitch and one training area. The club purchased additional land in the mid-1990s and developed a further full size pitch along with a training area. In the early 2000s, new dressing rooms were built adjoined to the old ones. This included 2 dressing rooms with showers and a gym which was later converted into two large dressing rooms, This expansion was necessary with the growth of Ladies Gaelic football and camogie within the club. A new hurling wall and storage area was subsequently built along with the expansion of the stand encompassing a press area. In 2024 the Club completed purchase of further adjacent lands with a view to develop additional Pitch facilities.

The grounds buildings presently consist of a clubhouse, including members bar, offices and social hall, two squash courts, 6 full size dressing rooms, referees room, showers, toilets, storage sheds and a stand which includes a press area. Playing and training facilities include two full-size playing fields both of which are floodlit, two training fields one floodlit, a hurling wall and a half-mile, sand running/amenity track. The club holds the world record for the largest GAA training session of all time.

== Roll of honour ==
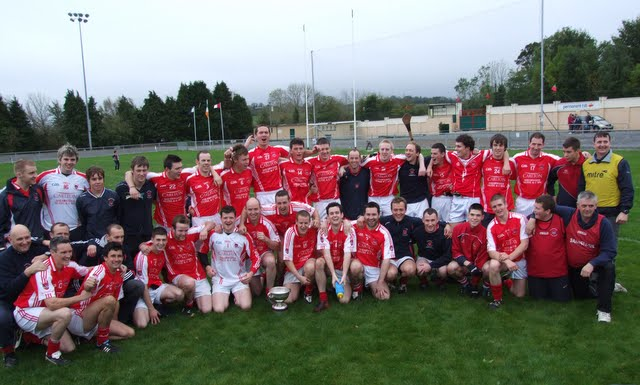
The Padraig Pearses team that won the 2011 Roscommon IFC

=== Hurling ===
- Roscommon Senior Hurling Championship: 4
  - 1984, 1987, 2017, 2020
- Roscommon Senior Hurling League: 6
  - 1989, 1990, 2010, 2012, 2015, 2025
- Connacht Senior Hurling League: 1
  - 1987/88
- Roscommon Junior Hurling Championship: 7
  - 1975(Creagh), 1995, 2002, 2003, 2004, 2011, 2017
- Roscommon U21 Hurling Championship: 10
  - 1997, 1998, 1999, 2002, 2014, 2015, 2016, 2017, 2018, 2022
- Roscommon Minor Hurling Championship: 9
  - 1996, 1999, 2001, 2011, 2012, 2015, 2016, 2018, 2025
- Roscommon Minor 9-aside Hurling Championship: 1
  - 2014
- Féile na nGael: 3
  - 1987, 1997(Division 3 Michael Cusack Trophy), 2012(Division 4 Dr Birch Trophy)

=== Ladies football ===
- Roscommon Ladies Senior Football Championship: 15
  - 1985, 1986, 1987, 1988, 1991, 1992, 1993, 1994, 1998, 1999, 2000, 2001, 2002, 2003, 2004.
- Roscommon Ladies Junior Football Championship: 1
  - 2015
- Roscommon Ladies Intermediate Football Championship: 1
  - 2016

=== Men's football ===
- Connacht Senior Club Football Championship : 1
  - 2021
- Roscommon Senior Football Championship : 3
  - 2019, 2021, 2024
- Roscommon Intermediate Football Championship: 1
  - 2011
- Connacht Leo Kenny Football Cup: 3
  - 2006, 2007, 2018
- Roscommon O'Rourke Cup (Division 1 Adult Football League): 3
  - 1969, 1985, 2021
- Roscommon O'Gara Cup (Division 2 Adult Football League): 1
  - 2012
- Roscommon Tansey Cup (Division 3 Adult Football League): ?
  - ?
- Roscommon Lee Cup (Division 4 Adult Football League): 2
  - 2014, 2018
- Roscommon Division 5 Adult Football League: 0
  - N/A
- Roscommon Division 6 Adult Football League: 1
  - 2018
- Roscommon Junior A Football Championship: 3
  - 1994, 2000, 2022
- Roscommon Junior B Football Championship: 1
  - 1990
- Roscommon Mid South Junior A Football Championship: 1
- Roscommon Mid South Junior B Football Championship: 1
  - 2011,
- Roscommon Under 20 Football Championship: 4
  - 1975, 1991, 2001, 2010, 2022
- Roscommon Minor Football Championship: 5
  - 1972, 1982, 2007, 2015, 2026
- Féile Peile na nÓg: 1
  - 2004 (Division 4, Limerick)

=== Camogie ===
- Roscommon Junior Camogie Championship: 3
  - 2006, 2017, 2018
- Roscommon Minor A Championship:
  - 2006
- Roscommon Minor B Championship:
  - 2007

== County panelists ==
Men's football

Year	Panel Members
2025	David Murray, Niall Daly, Ronan Daly and Declan Kenny
2024	David Murray, Niall Daly, Conor Daly, Caelim Keogh and Declan Kenny
2023	David Murray, Niall Daly, Conor Daly and Paul Carey
2022	
2021	
2020	David Murray, Niall Daly, Conor Daly, Ronan Daly, Hubert Darcy and Mark Richardson
2019	David Murray, Niall Daly, Conor Daly, Ronan Daly and Hubert Darcy
2018	David Murray, Niall Daly and Conor Daly
2017	David Murray and Niall Daly
2016	David Murray, Niall Daly and Ronan Daly
2015	Niall Carty (captain), Niall Daly, David Murray and Ronan Daly
2014	Niall Carty (captain) and Niall Daly
2013	Niall Carty, Niall Daly and Conor Daly
2012	Niall Carty and Niall Daly
2011	Niall Carty

== Gallery ==
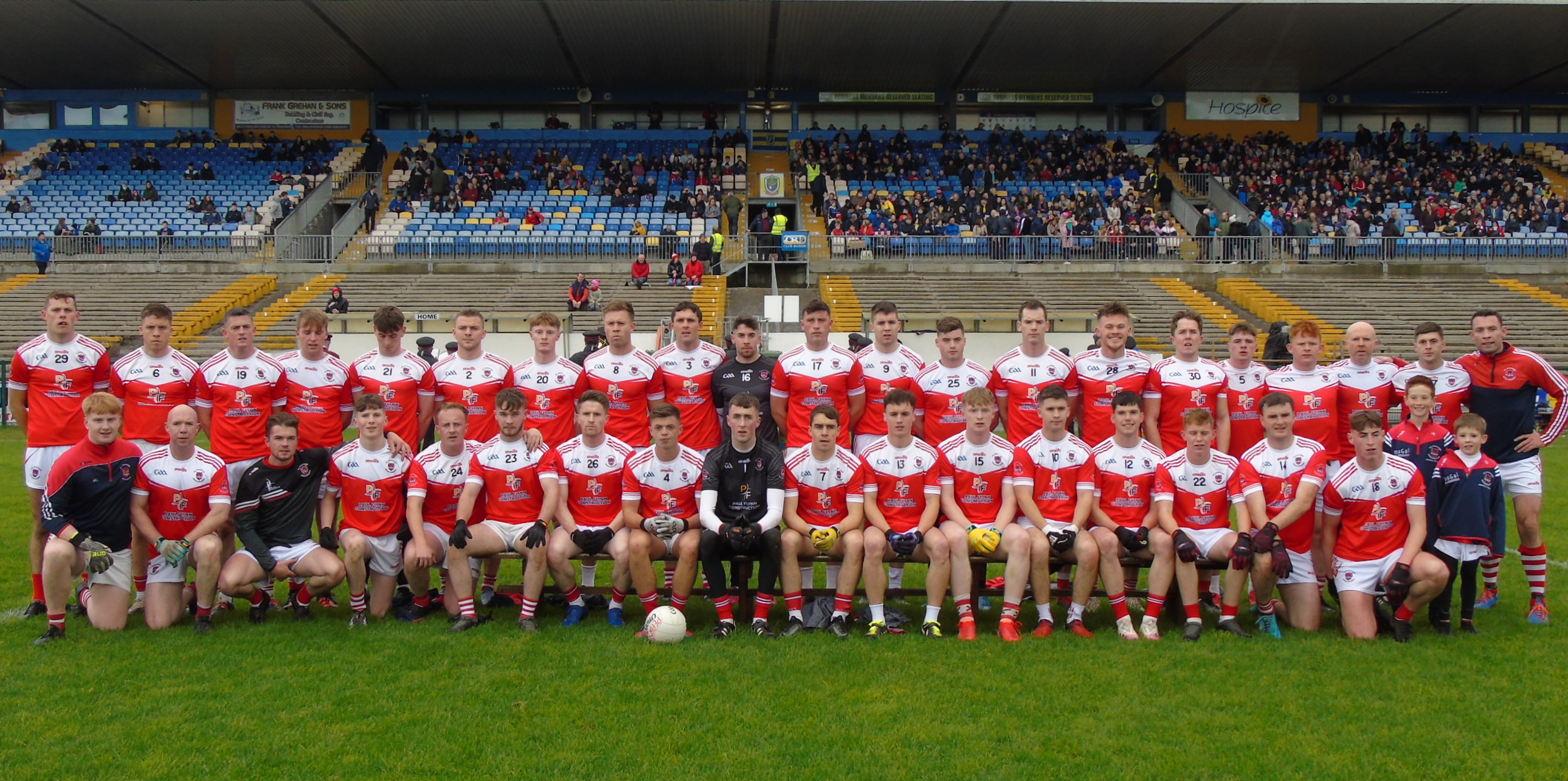
The Padraig Pearses Senior Football Panel photographed prior to the 2021 Roscommon County Final

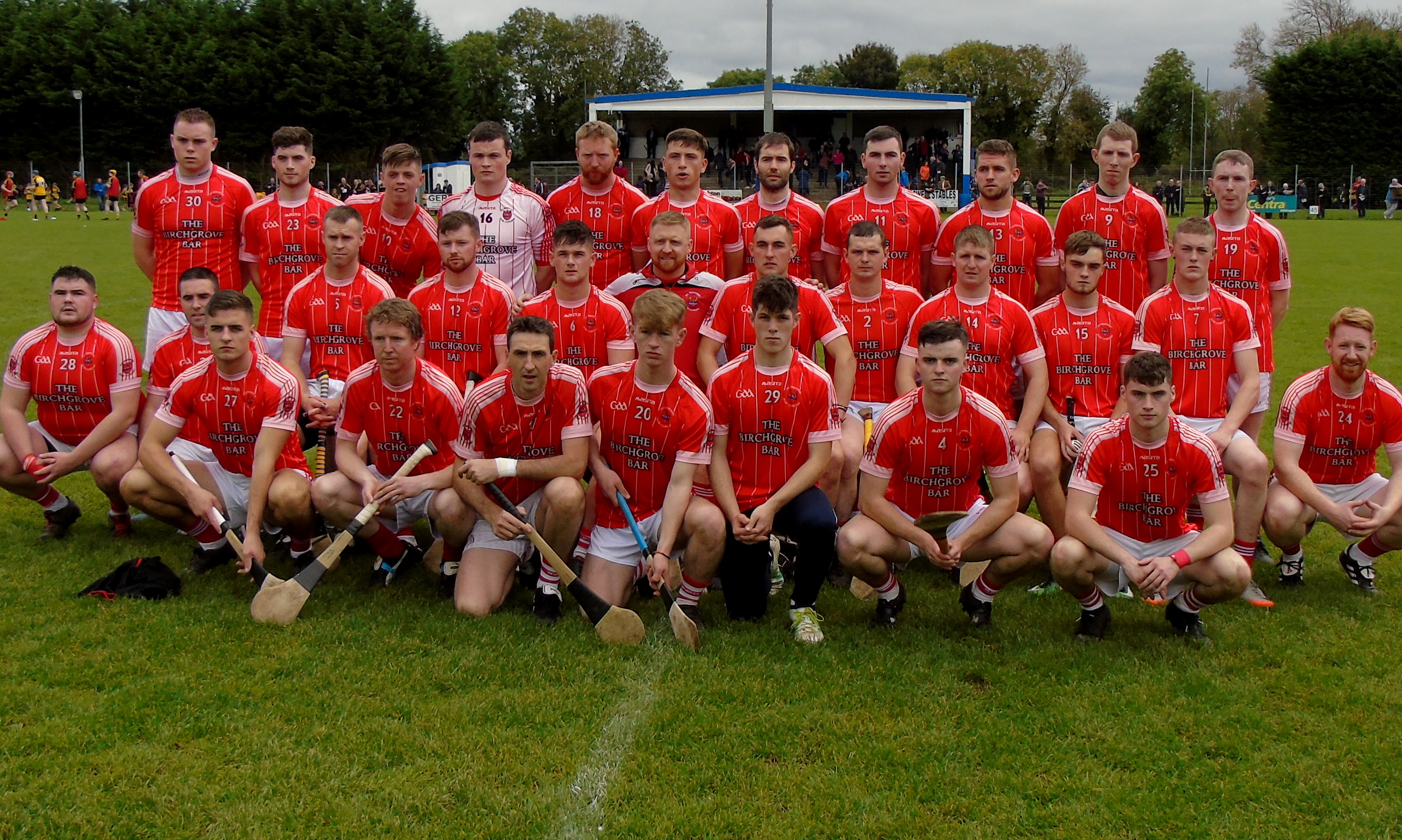
Roscommon Senior Hurling County Champions 2017

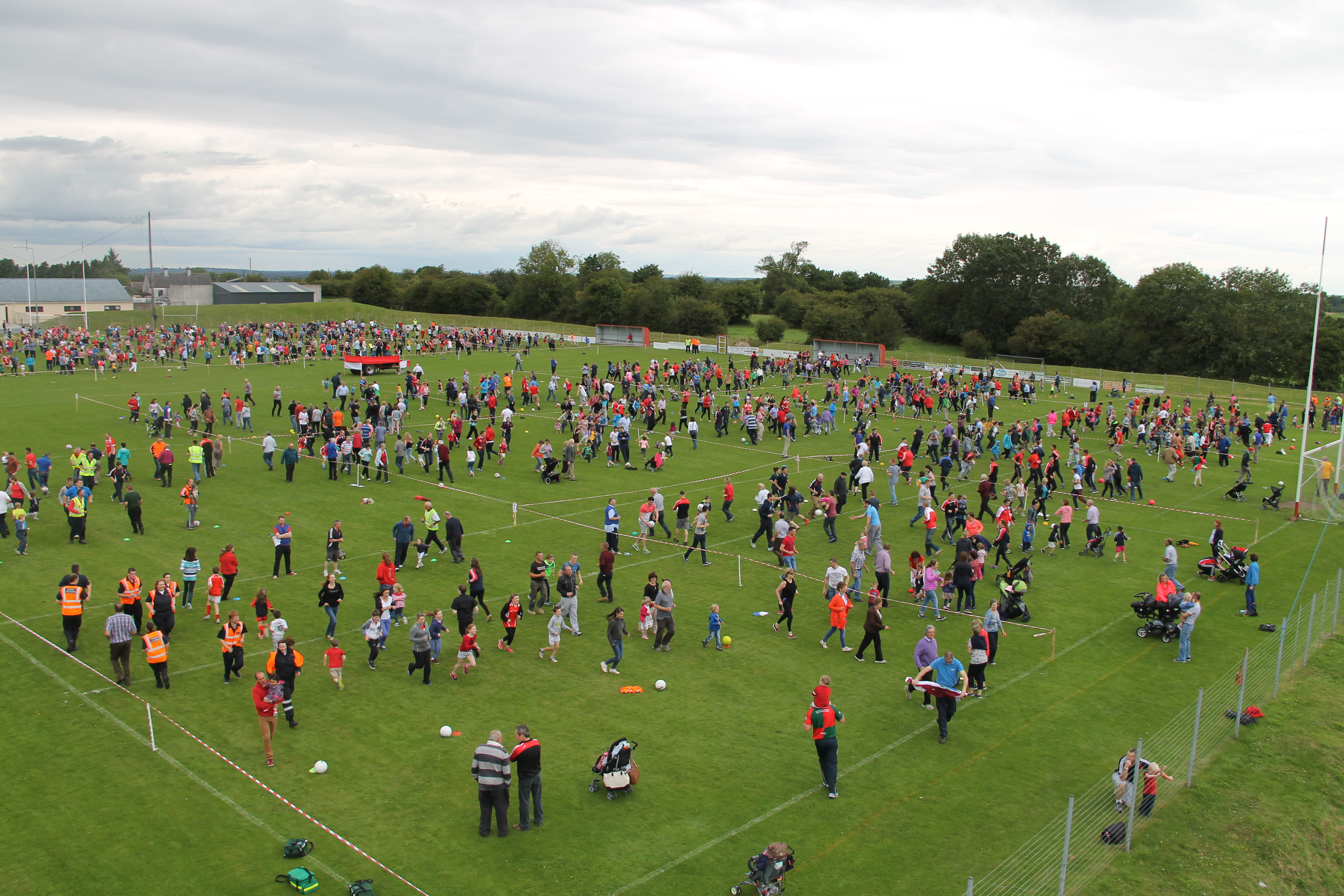
The largest GAA training session of all time recognised by the Guinness book of records

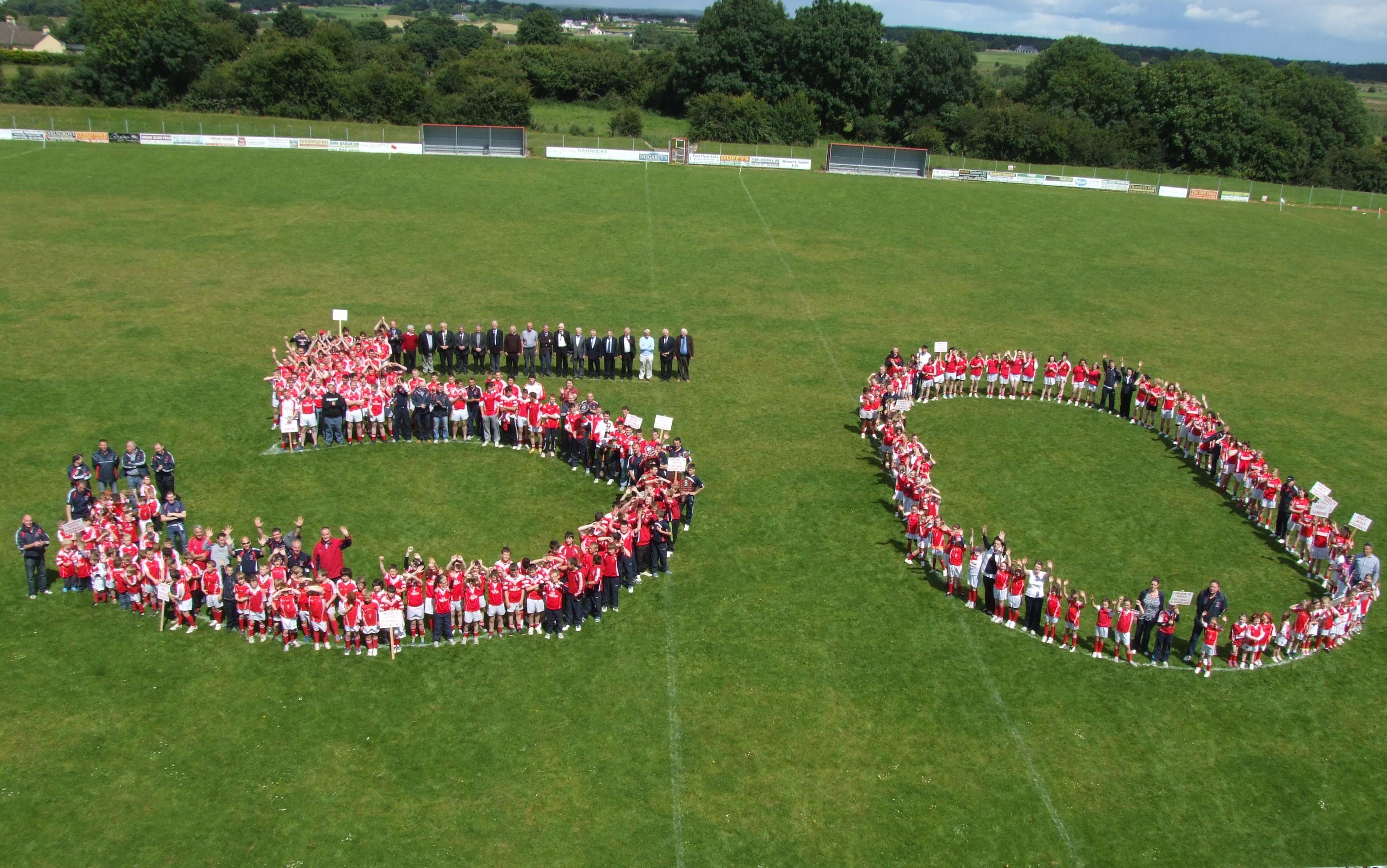
The big 50 comprises current and past members in all grades

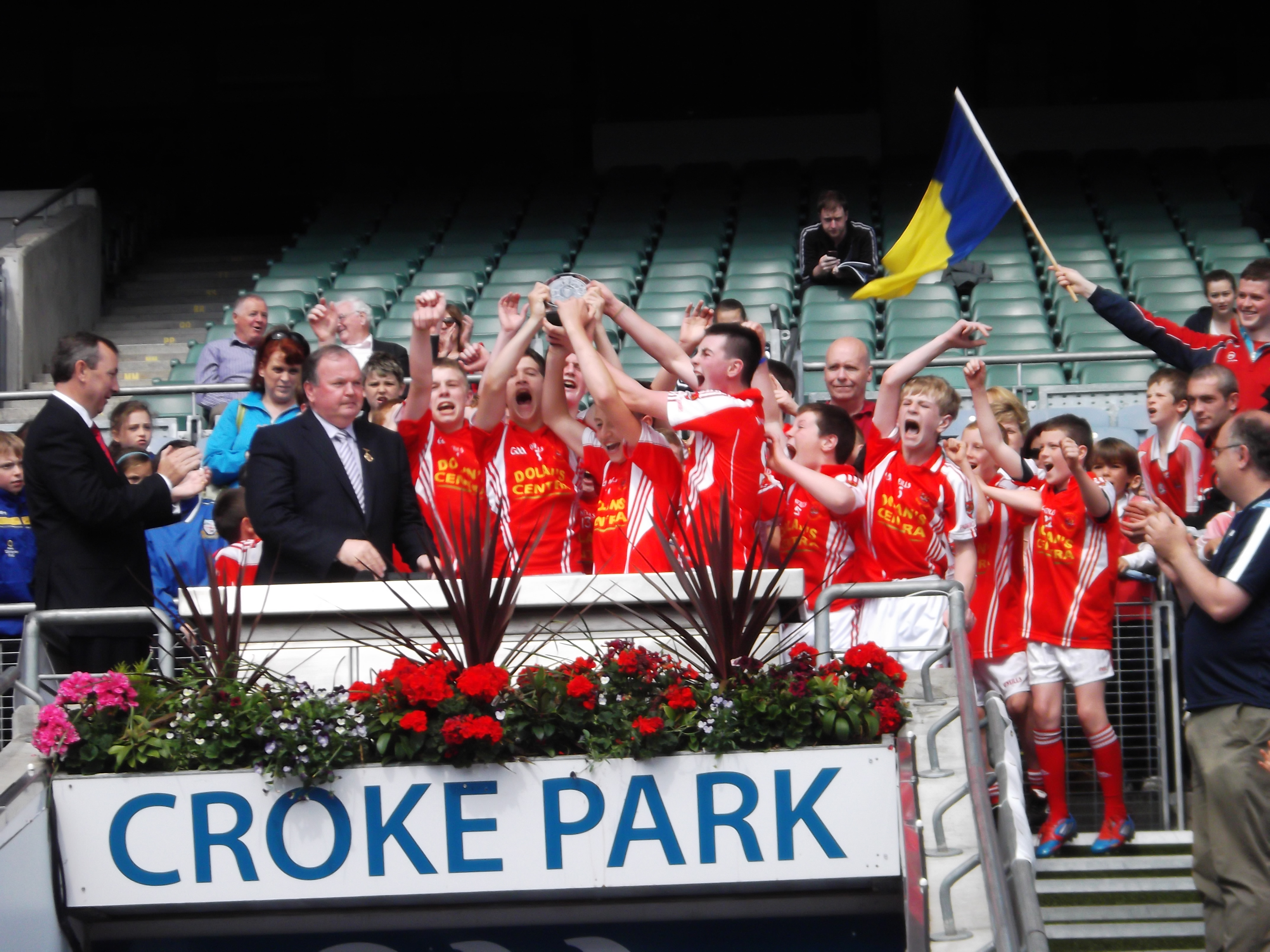
Presentation of the All Ireland Hurling Feile to Padraig Pearses Team

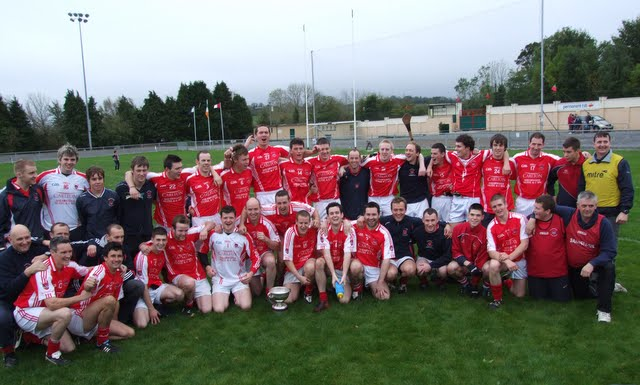
2011 Roscommon Intermediate Championship Winners

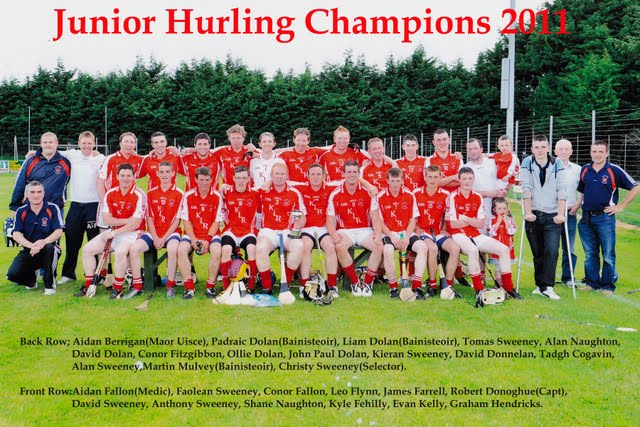
Roscommon Junior Hurling League Winners 2010
