= Jarlath Cloonan =

Irish hurling manager

Jarlath Cloonan (born 1953 in Athenry, County Galway) was the County Galway Senior Hurling Manager, 1994–96.

A former selector, Cloonan played a key role as Athenry won three All-Ireland club titles. He has held all the main officerships within the club.

In late 2009, he was nominated for the position of Galway Hurling Board secretary.

== See also ==
- Eugene Cloonan, Former player with the Galway hurling team.
