= Allan Yn Y Fan =

British folk group

Allan Yn Y Fan are a folk group originally formed in southeast Wales, but now containing members from north Wales and across the UK. They have been touring across the UK and Western Europe for over 20 years, performing in Welsh and English.

== Background ==
Allan Yn Y Fan (translating as 'on the spot' in English) were formed in South Wales in 1996 as a four-piece consisting of Geoff Cripps, Chris Jones, Kate Strudwick and Linda Simmonds. They have since performed in Wales, England, Ireland, France, Czech Republic, Luxembourg, Switzerland and twice toured Germany.

The band was joined by fiddle player Emma Trend between 2002 and 2007. Between 2008 and 2014 she was replaced by Meriel Field. Singer Catrin O'Neill (from North Wales) and fiddler Alan Cooper joined in 2015, bringing the band to six members.

Allan Yn Y Fan released their sixth album, called NEWiD, in 2016.
