= Four Roads Hurling Club =

- Ceithre Bhóthar
- Founded: 1905
- County: Roscommon
- Colours
- Grounds: Tisrara Community Sports Park
- Coordinates: 53°30′37″N 8°13′25″W

Playing kits
Standard colours

Senior Club Championships
	All Ireland	Connacht champions	Roscommon champions
Hurling:	0	2	39

Four Roads Hurling Club is a Gaelic Athletic Association club in Four Roads, County Roscommon, Ireland. The club is affiliated to the Roscommon County Board and is solely concerned with the game of hurling.

== History ==
Hurling had been played in the area since before the foundation of the Gaelic Athletic Association in 1884, when a local landlord organised an annual game against neighbouring Athleague. In 1905, a local schoolteacher set up the first hurling club in the parish. Known as Tisrara Maith-Go-Leors, the club won three consecutive Roscommon SHC titles between 1905 and 1907.

After a long period of decline and inactivity, hurling in the area was revived and Four Roads won the Roscommoon SHC title in 1946. Seven such titles were won between 1945 and 1962, to bring the club's overall tally of Roscommon SHC titles to ten. Four Roads continued to win Roscommon SHC titles at regular intervals in the decades that followed, as well as winning a first Conancht Club SHC title in 1977, after being granted a walkover by Kiltormer. The club won a second provincial title in 1988, a first on the field of play, after beating Abbeyknockmoy by 3–05 to 1–08 in the final.

The 21st century saw Four Roads secure pole position on the all-time roll of honour after winning a record eight consecutive Roscommon SHC titles between 2008 and 2015. The club won it's 39th Roscommon SHC title in 2026, after a 1–14 to 2–10 win over St Dominic's in the final.

== Honours ==
- Connacht Senior Club Hurling Championship (2): 1977, 1988
- Roscommon Senior Hurling Championship (39): 1905, 1906, 1907, 1945, 1946, 1948, 1950, 1954, 1958, 1962, 1971, 1977, 1981, 1982, 1983, 1986, 1988, 1991, 1993, 1996, 1997, 2000, 2001, 2002, 2005, 2008, 2009, 2010, 2011, 2012, 2013, 2014, 2015, 2019 2022, 2023, 2024, 2025, 2026

== Notable players ==
- Ben Tansey: Connacht SFC-winner (1978)
