= St Dominic's GAA =

Gaelic games club in County Roscommon, Ireland

St Dominic's
- Naomh Dominic
- Founded: 1973
- County: Roscommon
- Nickname: The Doms
- Colours: Blue and White
- Grounds: Galey, Knockcroghery
- Coordinates: 53°34′20″N 8°04′35″W

Playing kits
Standard colours

Senior Club Championships
	All Ireland	Connacht champions	Roscommon champions
Football:	-	0	6
Hurling:	-	0	3

St Dominic's GAA Club (Naomh Dominic) is a Gaelic Athletic Association club based in Knockcroghery, County Roscommon, Ireland. Formed from the amalgamation of a number of previous clubs, the current club was formed in 1973. It plays in blue and white and draws its membership from the half parishes of Knockcroghery, St. Johns and Rahara.

== History ==
Before the formation of St Dominic's, the area was home to as many as four clubs at a time. These included St Patrick's, representing Knockcroghery. St Patrick's was the club of many of the Roscommon Senior footballers who won the 1943 and 1944 All-Irelands, including Jimmy Murray who was the team's captain. During this period, the club won six Roscommon Senior Football Championships, in 1942, 1943, 1945, 1946, 1948 and 1949.

The current club was founded in 1973 through the amalgamation of St Patrick's from Knockcroghery and St Josephs from St Johns/Rahara. Today the club compete in both football and hurling at a Senior level and camogie and ladies football.

In 2022, St Dominic's returned to the Roscommon Senior Football Championship by defeating Éire Óg 2-08 to 2-06 in the final of the Roscommon Intermediate Football Championship. The club were defeated by Galway club Dunmore MacHales, 1-16 to 1-13, in the final of the 2022 Connacht Intermediate Club Football Championship.

== Notable players ==
- Jimmy Murray
- Liam Gilmartin
- Phelim Murray
- Mark Miley

== Honours ==
- Roscommon Senior Football Championship (6): 1942, 1943, 1945, 1946, 1948, 1949
- Roscommon Intermediate Football Championship (4): 1973, 1982, 1995, 2007, 2022
- Roscommon Junior A Football Championship (1): 2002
- Roscommon Senior Hurling Championship (3): 1967, 1994, 1999
