= Eugene Cloonan =

Irish hurler

Personal information
- Native name: Eoghan Ó Cluanáin (Irish)
- Born: 22 December 1978 (age 47) Athenry, County Galway, Ireland
- Occupation: Electrician
- Height: 5 ft 11 in (180 cm)

Sport
- Sport: Hurling
- Position: Full-forward
Club
Years	Club	Apps (scores)
1996–2008	Athenry	88 (53-652)
Club titles
- Galway titles: 6
- Connacht titles: 5
- All-Ireland Titles: 3
Inter-county*
Years	County	Apps (scores)
1997–2008	Galway	22 (14–116)
Inter-county titles
- Connacht titles: 3
- All-Irelands: 0
- NHL: 1
- All Stars: 1
- *Inter County team apps and scores correct as of 14:55, 19 January 2014.

Eugene Cloonan (born 22 December 1978) is an Irish retired hurler who played as a full-forward for the Galway senior team.

Born in Athenry, County Galway, Cloonan first played competitive hurling whilst at school at Athenry Vocational School. He arrived on the Inter-County scene at the age of seventeen when he first linked up with the Galway minor team, before later joining the under-21 side. He made his senior debut in the 1997 championship. Cloonan went on to play a key part for Galway for over a decade, and won three Connacht medals and one National Hurling League medal. He was an All-Ireland runner-up on one occasion.

As a member of the Connacht inter-provincial team at various times, Cloonan won one Railway Cup medals in 1999. At club level he was a three-time All-Ireland medallist with Athenry. In addition to this he also won five Connacht medals and six championship medals.

Cloonan's career tally of 14 goals and 116 points was a record score for a Galway player which stood until 2011 when it was surpassed by Joe Canning.

Throughout his career Cloonan made 22 championship appearances. His retirement came following the conclusion of the 2008 championship.

In retirement from playing, Cloonan became involved in team management and coaching. At club level he has coached the Athenry minor team, while at inter-county level he was involved with the Galway under-14 and intermediate teams. In November 2013 he became a selector to the Galway senior team.

== Early and private life ==
Cloonan was born in Athenry, County Galway in 1978. He was educated locally at the Athenry Vocational School where he collected three consecutive All-Ireland Vocational Schools titles in 1992, 1993, and 1994. Cloonan has worked as an electrician.

== Playing career ==
=== Club ===
Cloonan first came to prominence with Athenry winning championship medals in the under-14 1992 against Loughrea under-16 1994 after an epic battle with near neighbours Turloughmore and minor grade in 1993, 1994 and 1995.

In 1996 Cloonan joined the Athenry senior team. It was a successful debut year as he subsequently collected a championship medal following a 2–6 to 1–6 defeat of Carnmore. Cloonan missed the subsequent provincial decider, however, Athenry later reached the All-Ireland decider against Wolfe Tones. Nine points from Cloonan helped Athenry to a 0–14 to 1–8 victory. It was his first All-Ireland medal.

Athenry surrendered their titles in 1997, however, Cloonan collected a second championship medal in 1998 following a 1–15 to 1–12 defeat of Abbey-Duniry in a replay of the decider. He was moved to the position of goalkeeper for the subsequent 3–25 to 0–5 defeat of Tooreen. It was his first Connacht medal.

In 1999 Athenry dominated the county championship once again. A 1–16 to 1–10 defeat of Abbey-Duniry once again gave Cloonan a third championship medal. He later added a second Connacht medal to his collection following a facile 1–13 to 1–6 defeat of Tooreen. The subsequent All-Ireland final pitted Athenry against St. Joseph's Doora Barefield. Cloonan top scored with nine points as Athenry claimed a 0–16 to 0–12 victory. It was his second All-Ireland medal.

Athenry made it three county championships in-a-row in 2000. A 2–14 to 3–7 defeat of Sarsfield's gave Cloonan, who scored all but four points of his team's total, his fourth championship medal in five years. He later collected a third Connacht medal as Four Roads were easily defeated by 2–16 to 1–7. Graigue-Ballycallan provided the opposition in the subsequent All-Ireland decider. The Kilkenny champions had the lead with just a few seconds remaining, however, Cloonan scored a vital goal to level the match and force extra time. Athenry eventually won by 3–24 to 2–19. Not only did he collect a third All-Ireland medal but Cloonan was also named man of the match.

Three successive All-Ireland titles proved beyond Athenry, however, the team bounced back in 2002. A 1–16 to 3–7 victory gave Cloonan a fifth championship medal. He later won a fourth Connacht medal as Athenry accounted for Four Roads by 1–19 to 0–9.

In 2004 Cloonan won his sixth and final championship medal following a narrow 0–15 to 0–13 defeat of reigning champions Portumna. Athenry faced little competition from Ballyhaunis in the provincial decider, and a 2–16 to 0–7 victory gave Cloonan a fifth Connacht medal. Athenry later had the chance of securing a record-equalling fourth All-Ireland title, however, James Stephens defeated Cloonan's side by 0–19 to 0–14. Eugene's last game was against beagh in a match to see who would go through to the quarter-finals in 2008. beagh beat athenry after extra time, he was forced to retire after recurring injuries as he was approaching his 30th birthday.

In all, Cloonan made 88 Championship appearances for Athenry Senior Hurlers, from his debut against Portumna in 1996, to his final game against Beagh in 2008. During that time he amassed an incredible tally of 53 goals and 652 points. Some of his best performances include a 2-7 haul as a 17 year old vs Clarinbridge in the 1996 Semi-final, 14 points vs Carnmore in the 2000 Semi-final, and followed that up with 2-10 vs Sarsfields in the County Final.

=== Inter-county ===
Cloonan made his inter-county debut for Galway against Tipperary in the under-14 Tony Forrestal competition in 1992. He progressed through the under-age ranks before joining the Galway minor team in 1996. The All-Ireland decider that year saw Galway face Tipperary, however, the game ended in a 3–11 to 0–20 draw. The replay was also a close affair, however, Galway were narrowly defeated by 2–14 to 2–12.

In spite of being just seventeen years-old, Cloonan was also a member of the Galway under-21 team in 1996. Lining out as goalkeeper for the All-Ireland decider, he kept a clean sheet as Galway defeated Wexford by 1–14 to 0–7. It was his first All-Ireland medal.

Cloonan made his senior championship debut for Galway against Roscommon on 12 July 1997. The 6–24 to 0–5 trouncing gave Cloonan his first Connacht medal.

By 2001 Cloonan was one of Galway's deadliest forwards. A shock semi-final defeat of reigning champions Kilkenny propelled Galway to an All-Ireland showdown with old rivals Tipperary. Galway put it up to Tipp, however, two goals by Tipp's Mark O'Leary gave the Munster men the threshold to withstand a Galway comeback. With nine minutes to go Galway were only a point in arrears, however, Tipperary outscored Galway by five to three in those closing minutes. At the final whistle Tipperary were the winners by 2–18 to 2–15. In spite of this defeat Cloonan ended the year with an All-Star award.

Galway went into decline again following this defeat, having failed to build on a reasonably successful year.

In 2004 Cloonan won a National Hurling League medal following Galway's 2–15 to 1–13 defeat of Waterford.

Cloonan played for Galway during the National League in 2005, however, he drifted away from the team then and played no part in Galway's All-Ireland final appearance that year. He returned to the panel in 2006. He retired after the loss to Cork in the 2008 championship due to a string of recurring injuries.

=== Inter-provincial ===
Cloonan has also lined out with Connacht in the inter-provincial championship. He has won one Railway Cup medal in 1999.

== Honours ==
=== Team ===
Athenry

- All-Ireland Senior Club Hurling Championship (3): 1997, 2000, 2001
- Connacht Senior Club Hurling Championship (6): 1996, 1998, 1999, 2000, 2002, 2004
- Galway Senior Club Hurling Championship (6): 1996, 1998, 1999, 2000, 2002, 2004

Galway

- Connacht Senior Hurling Championship (3): 1997, 1998, 1999
- National Hurling League (1): 2004

 U21 All Ireland 1996 ( Goalkeeper)

Connacht

- Railway Cup (1): 2004

=== Individual ===
Awards

- All-Star Award (1): 2001
