= Athleague HC =

Athleague
- Áth Liag
- Founded: 1901
- County: Roscommon
- Colours: Blue and white
- Grounds: Waldron Park, Cloonykelly, Athleague
- Coordinates: 53.574468°N 8.267531°W

Playing kits
Standard colours

Senior Club Championships
| | All Ireland | Connacht champions | Roscommon champions |
|---|---|---|---|
| Hurling: | 0 | 0 | 20 |

Athleague Hurling Club is a hurling club located in Athleague, County Roscommon, Ireland. They were founded in 1901; soon after, they challenged a team from Athlone.

Their grounds, Waldron Park, are often used by Roscommon hurling team.

A camogie team was founded in 1979.

== Honours ==
- Roscommon Senior Hurling Championship (19): 1908, 1909, 1910, 1916, 1928, 1929, 1937, 1947, 1949, 1953, 1955, 1957, 1959, 1975, 1978, 2003, 2006, 2007, 2018,2021
- All-Ireland Junior Club Camogie Championship Runner-Up 2015
- Connacht Senior Club Hurling Championship: Runners-Up 1975, 2003, 2006
