= Four Roads, Ireland =

Four Roads Tigh Srathra
- Village
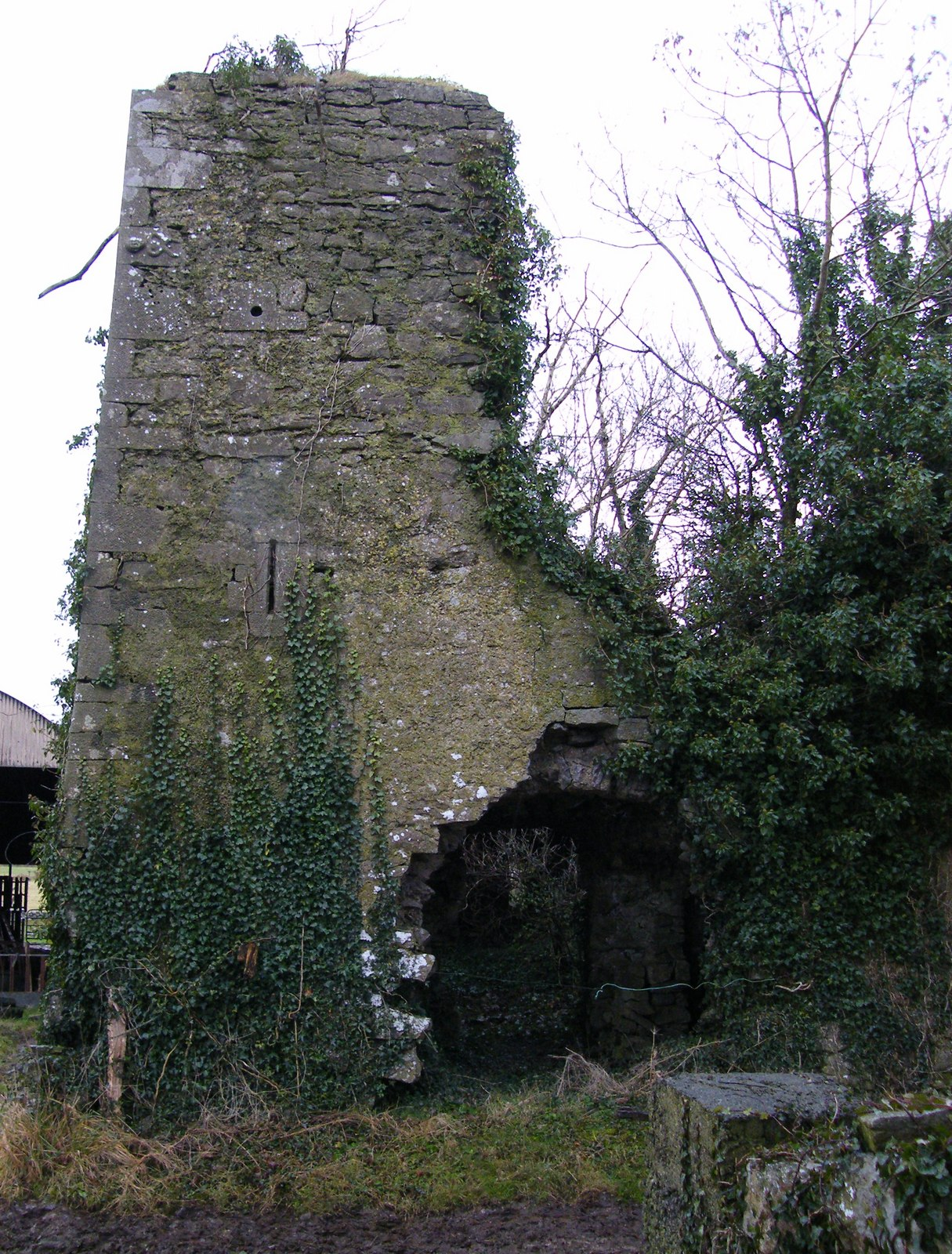
- Cloghan Castle is a protected 16th century tower house located just south of Four Roads

- Location in Ireland
- Coordinates: 53.516°N 8.223°W
- Country: Ireland
- Province: Connacht
- County: County Roscommon
- Elevation: 52 m (171 ft)
- Irish Grid Reference: M826577

Four Roads (Irish: Tigh Srathra, meaning 'house of the stream') is a village in County Roscommon, Ireland. It is situated about 16 km (10 mi) from Roscommon town, and about 28 km (17 mi) from Athlone.

== Gaelic games ==
Four Roads GAA club, founded in 1904, is the most successful hurling club in the county, with 34 Roscommon Senior Hurling Championship titles.

Four Roads Camogie club have also had success at county and national level, winning seven county championships in a row between 2008 and 2014. In the middle of those wins, they won the 2010 All Ireland Junior Club title.
