= Woodmount =

Village in County Roscommon, Ireland

Coordinates: 53°20′14.95″N 8°9′15.07″W

Woodmount is a village in the civil parish of Creagh in south County Roscommon, Ireland. It is approximately 3.5 miles east of the town of Ballinasloe, County Galway, and approximately 800 metres north of the old N6 Athlone to Ballinasloe road. The village is in the townlands of Tonalig and Clooneen. The clubhouse and playing fields of Padraig Pearses GAA Roscommon club have been situated in Woodmount since 1983.
