= Knockcroghery =

Village in County Roscommon, Ireland

Knockcroghery Irish: Cnoc an Chrochaire
- Village
- Location in Ireland
- Coordinates: 53°34′32″N 08°05′41″W
- Country: Ireland
- Province: Connacht
- County: County Roscommon
- Dáil Éireann: Roscommon–Galway
- EU Parliament: Midlands–North-West
- Elevation: 82 m (269 ft)

Population (2022)
  - Total: 388
- Irish Grid Reference: M937583

Knockcroghery (Irish: Cnoc an Chrochaire) is a village and townland in County Roscommon, Ireland. It is located on the N61 road between Athlone and Roscommon town, near Lough Ree on the River Shannon. The townland of Knockcroghery is in the civil parish of Killinvoy and the historical barony of Athlone North.

Knockcroghery developed as a largely linear settlement close to Galey Castle, a 14th-century tower house overlooking Galey Bay. By the 18th century, the village comprised a number of small houses, shops, blacksmith, mill, church and a fair green. For a number of centuries, the village economy was focused on the making of clay tobacco pipes, with eight kilns employing approximately 100 people by the 19th century. In the early 20th century, much of the village was burnt in a reprisal attack by the Black and Tans during the Irish War of Independence, and a number of buildings in the village centre date from a subsequent rebuilding exercise.

As of the early 21st century, it is classified as a "key village" for planning purposes by Roscommon County Council, with Knockcroghery acting as a commuter village for Athlone, Roscommon town, Longford town and Ballinasloe. The village had a population of 388 people as of the 2022 census of Ireland.

== Name ==
The village lies at the foot of a stony ridge, which protects it from the east wind that sweeps in from Galey Bay. This accounts for the original name of the village, 'An Creagán', meaning 'the stoney hill'.

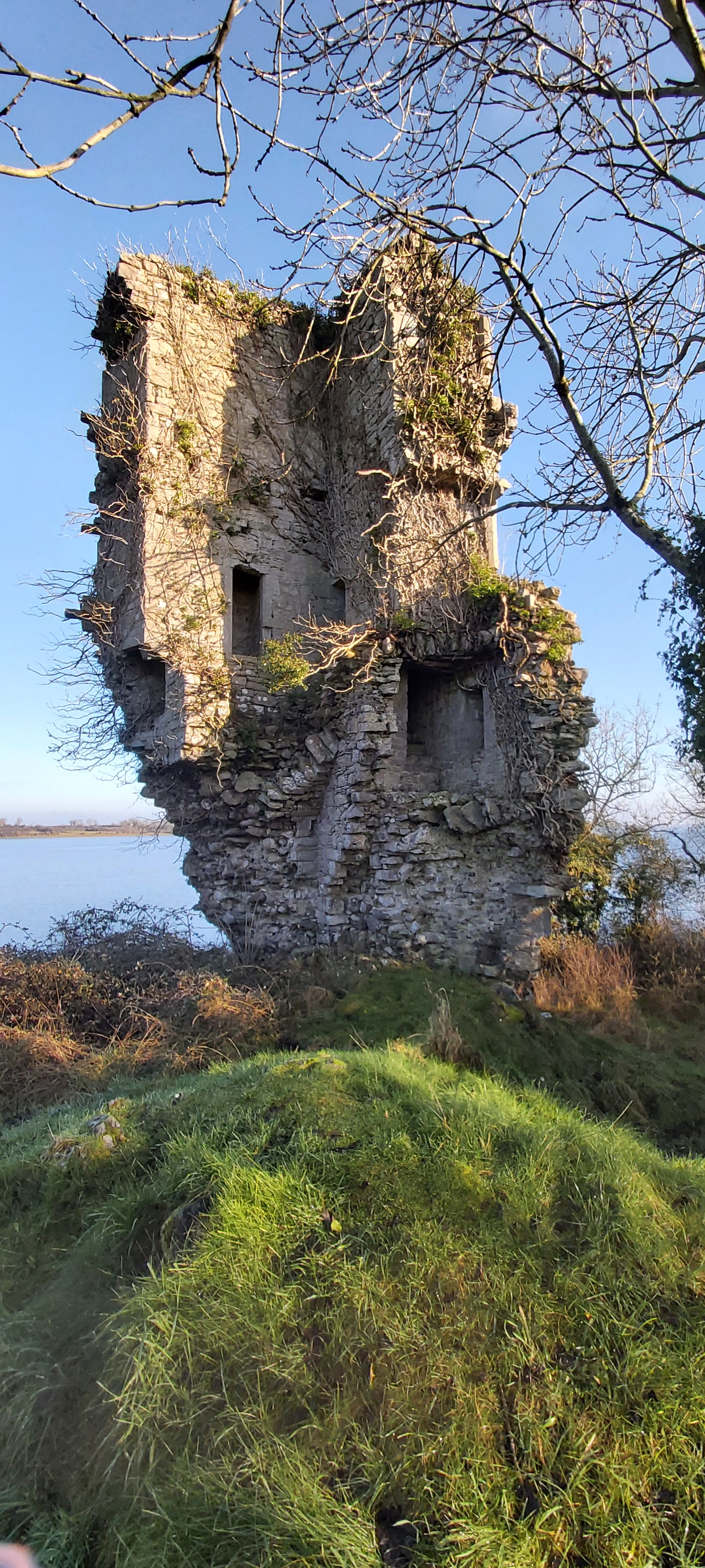
Galey Castle ruin with stairs, doorways and windows visible

In 1651, during Oliver Cromwell's invasion of Ireland, Charles Coote laid siege to Galey Castle, the seat of the Irish clan Ó Ceallaigh. The Ó Ceallaighs resisted and for their defiance were taken to An Creagán and hanged en masse on the stepped hill just north of the village, now commonly known as Hangman's Hill. The village thereafter came to be known as Cnoc an Chrochaire ('Hangman's Hill'), now Anglicised as 'Knockcroghery'.

== History ==
=== Development ===
Evidence of ancient settlement in the area includes a number of ringfort sites in Knockcroghery townland itself, and in the surrounding townlands of Glebe and Lisnahoon.

The area's first appearance in the historical records is in the year 1156, when the king of Connacht, Ruaidrí Ua Conchobair, established a harbour at Galey Bay, which was an ideal location due to the natural shelter provided by the enclosed bay and its proximity to the over-land route from Athlone to Roscommon, which followed a similar route to the present-day N61 road. A defensive fort was later constructed at Galey Bay, and associated human settlements developed nearby, including at the present-day townland of Galey, close to the current site of St Dominic's GAA club. The original road to Galey Bay ran along the present-day local road past St Dominic's club, before turning north towards the bay. In the late 19th century, the current road was constructed along the route from Curry, and replaced the old road entirely, most of which is now buried and identifiable only by the route of some hedgerows on private land. The new road is believed to have been constructed by the Crofton family in order to access their boathouse at Galey Bay more directly from their residence in Mote Park.

Knockcroghery village developed as another settlement associated with the fort at Galey Bay, along the main over-land route between Athlone and Roscommon.

A mill and adjacent stores were constructed on the river at the northern end of the village, but these had fallen into decay by the 1830s.

As of the early 19th century, the village had a population of approximately 180 inhabitants.

By the 19th century, the village had grown to include a number of small thatched homes, several shops, a blacksmith, a mill, a post office, police barracks, a church and a fair green. By the 1830s, there was one three-storey slate-roofed building, four two-storey thatched buildings and approximately 40 single-storey thatched cabins. The thatched cabins tended to be quite long, with three or four rooms. An Anglican church was built in the early 19th century and a school was opened in the 1830s. While the school was being completed, classes were held in the nave of the church. The school remained in use until St Mary's National School opened in the village in 1960, and the old school became the village hall.

=== Clay pipe industry ===
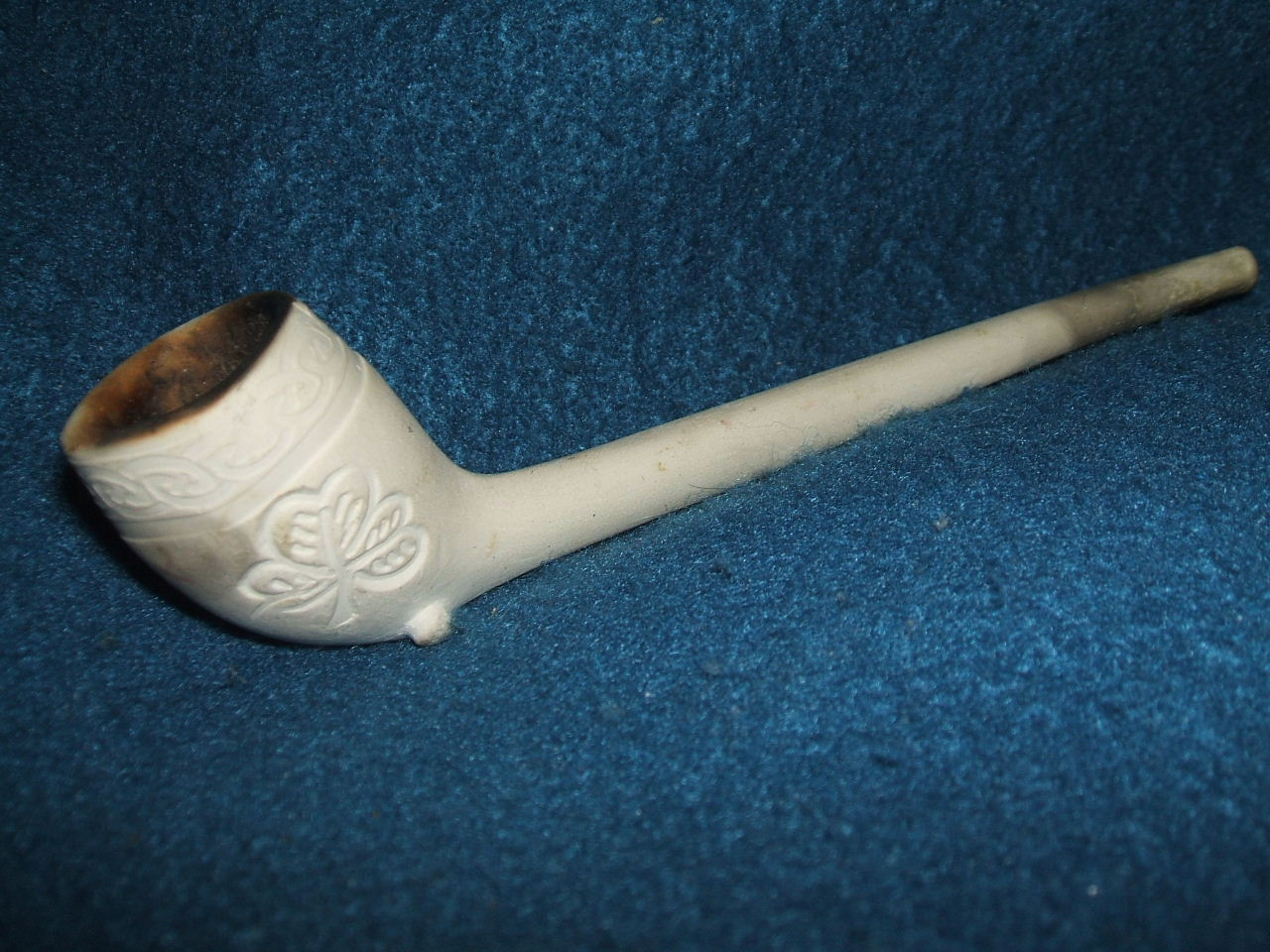
Knockcroghey clay pipe or "dúidín"

From the 18th century onwards, the village was known for the production of the tobacco clay pipe, or "dúidín".

The development of the clay pipe industry in the village is attributed to a man familiar with the process having moved to the village and having taught it to others. Knockcroghery was not a particularly favourable location for such an industry, given that the nearest source of suitable clay was some three kilometres away and the fuel for the kilns was more expensive there than in other parts of the country.

By 1832, approximately eight kilns were operating in Knockcroghery and between them were producing an average of 70,000 pipes per week.

The pipes produced in Knockcroghery in the 1830s were said to be of good quality but with small bowls and short stems. As a result, they were held in low regard in the larger towns and were principally used for handing out at wakes, given that a smaller amount of tobacco was required to fill each pipe for guests.

By the late 19th century, there were up to 100 people involved in the manufacture and distribution of the village's clay pipes. Production ceased abruptly on 21 June 1921 when the village was burned down by the Black and Tans during the Irish War of Independence. Today, a visitor centre and workshop are located on the original site of Andrew and P.J. Curley's pipe factory, where pipes are handcrafted using the original methods of production.

There had also been a crockery industry in the village until the mid to late 19th century, until imports from Staffordshire made the business unviable.

=== Irish War of Independence ===
==== Terror at the fair ====
On the evening of Thursday 26 August 1920, 36-year-old Royal Irish Constabulary Constable William J Potter, who was temporarily stationed in Kiltoom, was cycling with fellow Constable Michael McMahon, from Roscommon to Kiltoom. The Constables were ambushed by the Irish Volunteers on the Athlone side of the level crossing in Knockcroghery, who fired at them. As the pair sped past the Volunteers and tried to escape, Constable Potter was shot through the right lung and fell to the ground, where he died. Constable McMahon survived, but resigned from the RIC shortly afterward. Constable Potter's assassination led to Kiltoom RIC barracks being abandoned.

A few days later, while a fair was going on in Knockcroghery, a party of Black and Tans arrived in the village and, in retaliation for Constable Potter's death, they rounded up all the men into the village's Gaelic handball alley and beat them with bull whips. The Black and Tans also requisitioned several tins of paint from a local shop and forced the men to paint over an Irish tricolour that had recently been painted onto the wall of the handball alley. The Black and Tans then forced the men to place their hands onto the wet paint and then put their hands into their pockets and wipe them on their clothes.

==== Burning of Knockcroghery ====
On 20 June 1921, British Army Colonel Commandant Thomas Stanton Lambert's motorcar was ambushed by the Westmeath Irish Volunteers in Glassan. The Volunteers had planned to capture Lambert and hold him until a prisoner exchange was arranged in return for General Seán Mac Eoin. When Lambert's motorcar did not stop at the barricade on the Glassan Road, the IRA men opened fire. Lambert suffered bullet wounds and died the next day. British military intelligence mistakenly believed that the killers had come across Lough Ree from the Galey Bay/Knockcroghery area.

At approximately 1 a.m. on 21 June 1921, a group of 12 to 15 Black and Tans wearing civilian clothing and masks descended on Knockcroghery from the Athlone direction, in retaliation for the attack on Colonel Commandant Lambert the day before. They arrived in four lorries and parked at St Patrick's Church. Reportedly drunk, they fired shots into the air, ordered the people outside, and began setting fire to their homes. The residents were given no opportunity to get dressed or to save their houses or possessions. The summer having been particularly dry, the Black and Tans easily set fire to the thatched roofs of the cottages using petrol, and most burned to the ground very quickly. Murray's, Flanagan's and the presbytery were not so easy to set alight, due to their slate roofs.

Michael O'Callaghan described the scene:

the raiding forces drove up and down the village, firing shots at random, cursing loudly, and laughing at the plight of the people of Knockcroghery. The people were terrified, particularly the children, whose cries of fear added to the terrible scene.

The Irish Times reported:

there were constant fusillades of rifle and revolver firing. Terrified people rushed out of their houses and made their escape through fields.

One of the first houses to be targeted was that of Patrick Curley, who owned one of the two significant pipe factories remaining in the village. Two Black and Tans, apparently officers, burst his door in and put him out at gunpoint. They sprinkled his floor with petrol and set the house on fire. He and his children fled through the nearby fields. Unable to set John S. Murray's roof alight, the Black and Tans set fire to the back door. Murray reacted quickly to put the fire out. Next door, Mary "The Widow" Murray refused to leave her home when ordered out by the Black and Tans. She gathered her six young children around her and defied the Black and Tans to burn the house with them inside it. Eventually, an officer ordered his men to leave the family alone and the house was spared. Canon Bartholomew Kelly refused to leave the presbytery until the Black and Tans began dousing his furniture with petrol. He jumped out of his bedroom window onto a shed twelve feet below, hid until they had left, and then fled through a nearby field. His slate roof, together with the quick actions of women such as Jenny Quigley in bringing sand and water to extinguish the fire, saved his house from being totally destroyed.

The flames above Knockcroghery alerted people from the area and, by daylight, the street was full of people. On the evening of the burning, there had been fifteen houses on the main street of Knockcroghery, most of them single-storey thatched cottages. By the following morning, all but four (the Presbytery, John S. Murray's, the Widow Murray's and Murtagh's) had been burned to the ground.

The Irish Times described the aftermath:

Subsequently, the children and aged persons were taken into the Presbytery (which was also attempted to be set fire to) and the Rev Mr Humphrey's Rectory, where they were kindly treated. This morning the town presents a shocking appearance, being a mass of smouldering ruins, with the occupants of the houses homeless and destitute, all their belongings being consumed in the general conflagration.

Jamesie Murray remembered the assistance given to those who had lost their homes:

They came from all over to help. People brought clothes, and a fund was soon set up. The families who were now homeless were accommodated in the vicinity, many staying with relatives who lived nearby. Farm sheds were converted into temporary dwellings. Canon Kelly and others found temporary accommodation with Knockcroghery's Church of Ireland rector, Canon Humphries. Later, three or four new cottages were built on the Shrah road and given to bachelors, who then took people in.

The village was rebuilt over the next few years, after Ireland had gained independence from the UK, with help from grants from the Free State Government. The construction work provided employment locally, at a time when it was needed. Many of the businesses that had been destroyed were gradually re-established, but the clay pipe factory that had provided employment in the village for over 250 years was never rebuilt.

== Catholic parish of Knockcroghery ==
Prior to the 1870s, what is now the parish of Knockcroghery was two separate parishes: Killinvoy and Kilmaine. The church in Killinvoy was built during the 1810s when the Penal Laws were being relaxed prior to the granting of full Catholic Emancipation in 1829. It ceased to be used as a church in 1883 but continues to be used as a community centre to this day, and is known as Culleen Hall. The church in Kilmaine was a very old, small thatched building. After it ceased to be used as a church, it was demolished and is now the site of Ballymurray National School.

In the early 1870s, the parishes of Killinvoy and Kilmaine were merged into the parish of St Patrick, Knockcroghery. In the mid-1870s, a decision was made to build a new, more centrally located church. Lord Crofton of Mote Park gave a site on the Southern edge of Knockcroghery for a nominal rent of a shilling per year. Construction work commenced in 1879 and St Patrick's Church was consecrated on 18 October 1885. The cost of construction was £3,000, of which, £1,313 remained outstanding at the time of consecration. Donations were received following an appeal in the sermon at the consecration, which assisted in paying down the debt of the construction. The churches in Culleen and Ballymurray closed down, but many of the parishioners of Ballymurray refused to transfer to Knockcroghery and continued attending the old Ballymurray church at mass time every Sunday to say the Rosary until it was demolished in 1886.

The merging of the parishes was completed in 1942, with the opening of the new cemetery in Gailey, which replaced the separate cemeteries in Kilmaine and Killinvoy.

== Places of interest ==
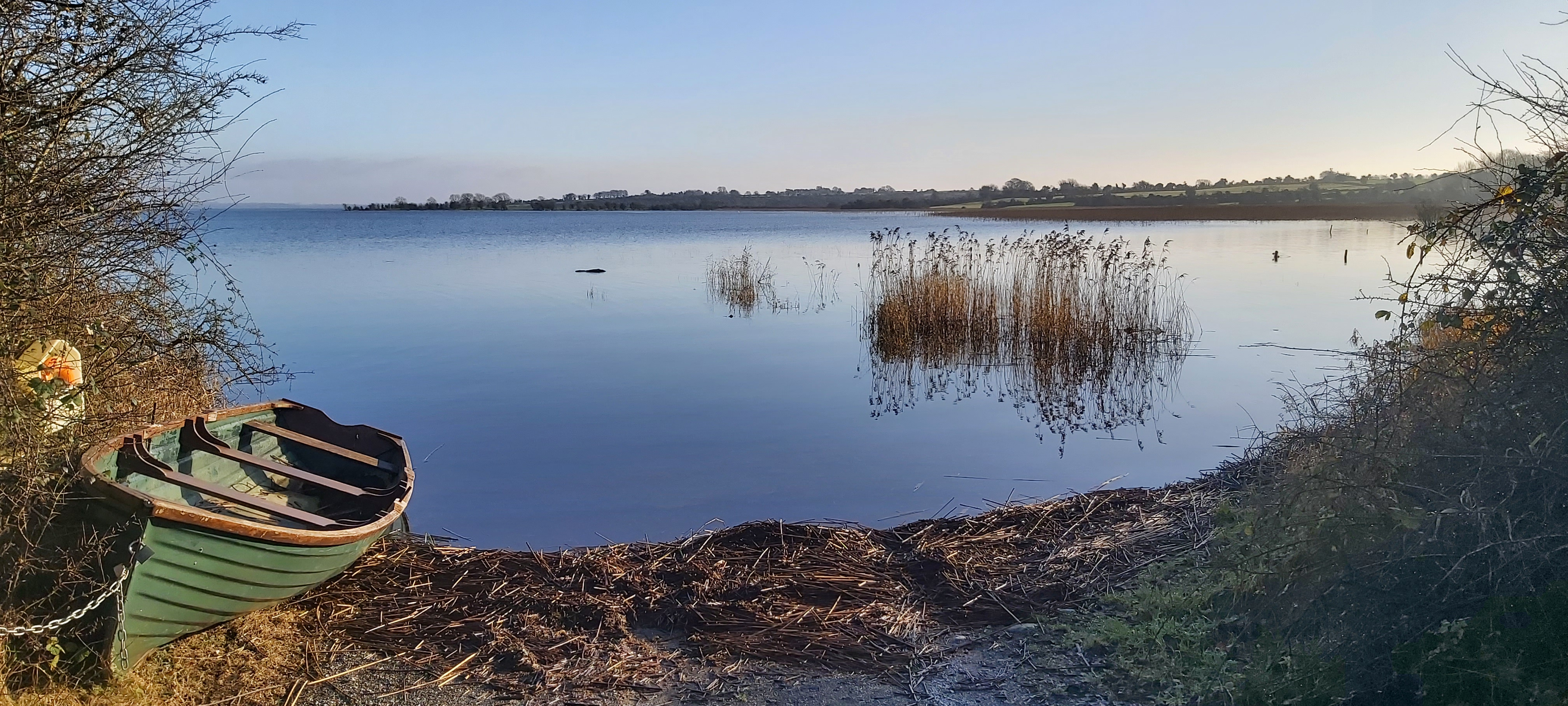
Galey Bay with boat in foreground

- Near Galey Bay on the shore of Lough Ree stands Galey Castle, seat of the Chiefs of Clan Ó Ceallaigh and built in 1348.
- Galey Bay was the location of a regatta held annually from the 1870s to the late 1920s. The regattas were run by Lord Crofton of Mote Park.
- The island of Inchcleraun on Lough Ree is named after a sister of Queen Maeve, Clothra. Queen Maeve is said to have been killed here by an enemy while she was bathing. In later centuries, the island was nicknamed Quaker Island and the remains of seven churches are found on the island. The ruin of the old Quaker meeting house still stands in Ballymurray.
- Portrun is the local lakeside resort and is used by both tourists and locals during the summer months.

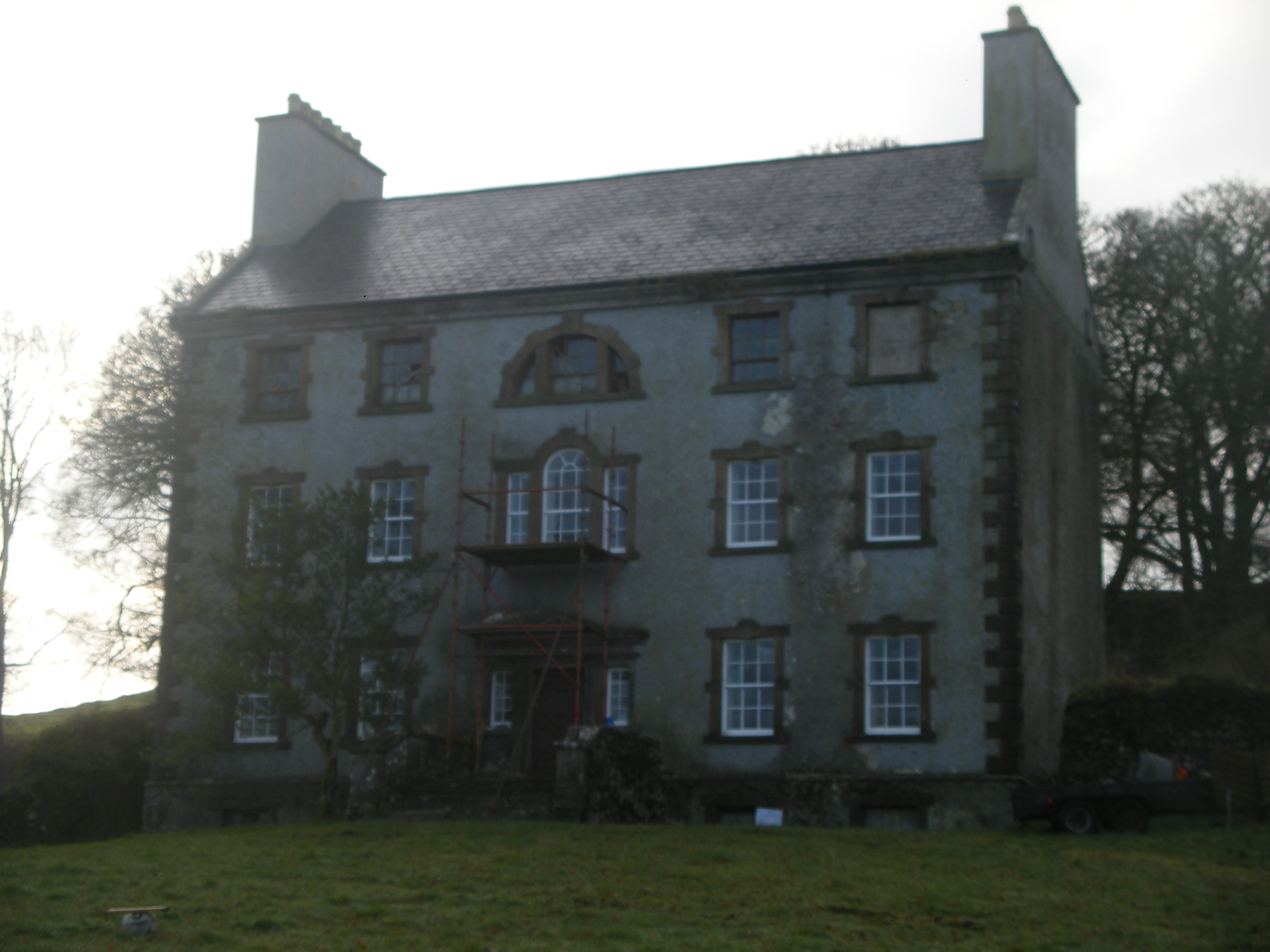
Scregg House

- Scregg House, seat of the Kelly family from the 18th century onwards, is located nearby. On the grounds of the house are some excellent examples of Sheela na Gigs. The building itself is an example of a 3-storey 5-bay mid-18th-century country house.
- Culleen Hall is located 1 km south of Knockcroghery, and is used as a venue for concerts and local events, as well as a local pre-school.
- Hangman's Hill, the site of the hangings of the Ó Ceallaigh clan in the 17th century, is located at the northern end of the village, opposite the Post Office.
- The Clay Pipe Visitors' Centre is located on the site of the former clay pipe factory. Visitors can witness the manufacturing of clay pipes by traditional methods and learn about the history of the industry.

== Architecture ==
=== Built heritage ===
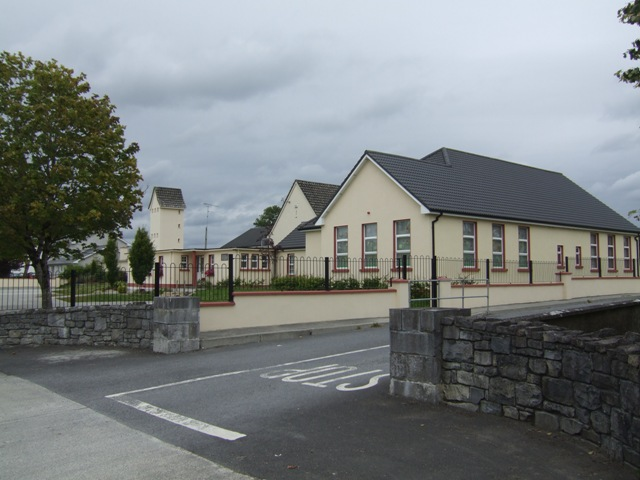
St Mary's National School, Knockcroghery

Much of the architecture of the village centre dates from the 1920s when the village was rebuilt after the burning by the Black and Tans. A number of buildings, such as the church, the community centre, the parochial house, Murray's and the Widow Pat's, predate this however. The Record of Protected Structures, as maintained by Roscommon County Council, includes Scregg House and a number of other 19th century buildings in the Knockcroghery area.

The village's Anglican church was constructed in the early 19th century and was demolished with explosives in 1966. The stone from the church was reused to build a church elsewhere. The local school was temporarily evacuated for the demolition. The site formerly occupied by the Anglican church is now occupied by a petrol station. The former rectory associated with the village's former Anglican church remains standing.

=== Saint Patrick's Catholic Church ===
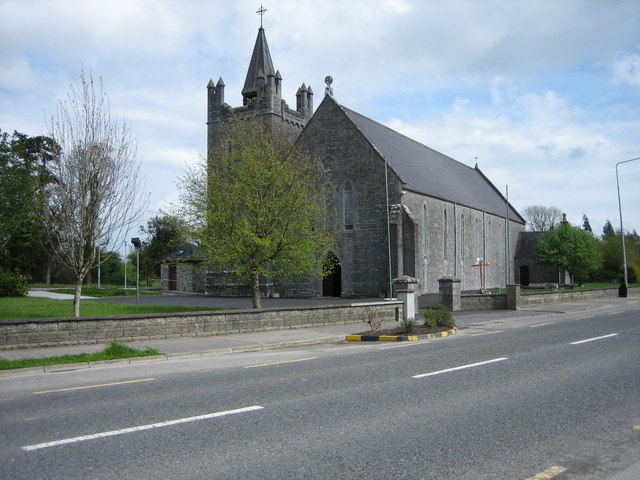
St. Patrick's Church (Roman Catholic)

St. Patrick's Catholic Church is an example of late nineteenth-century ecclesiastical design. It features a two-stage bell tower with pinnacles and a more recently added copper spire. It was built commencing in 1879, with the church being consecrated on 18 October 1885. In the early 1950s, the tower and spire were completed, the bell was installed and the choir gallery was built. At the same time, repair works were carried out, the church was replastered internally and wiring for electric lighting and heating was installed in anticipation of the arrival of rural electrification. In the meantime, lighting was provided by a petrol-powered generator. Electricity came to the village in late 1953.

The carved limestone baptismal font in St Patrick's Church came from the old church in Ballymurray (now the site of Ballymurray National School). It was initially used as a holy water font inside the front door before being moved to its current location beside the altar to be used as a baptismal font. The smaller carved limestone holy water font, which is built into the wall inside the tower door, is believed to have come from the old church in Culleen (now Cullen Hall).

The stained glass windows on the Eastern side of the church depict the history of the church in Ireland, including the old thatched church in Ballymurray.

== Transport ==
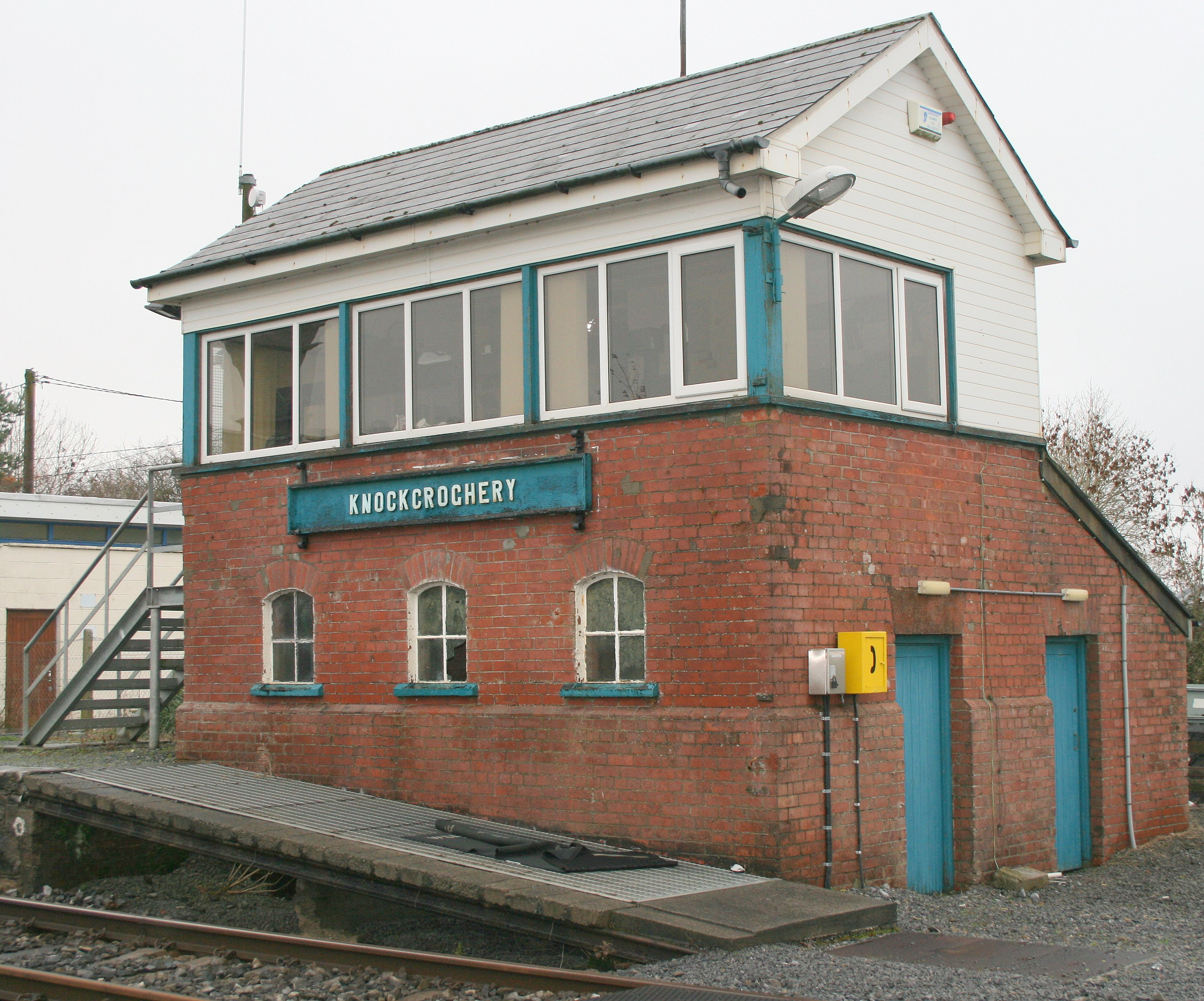
Signal box at former Knockcroghery railway station

Knockcroghery railway station opened on 13 February 1860 and finally closed on 17 June 1963, although trains on the Westport-Dublin line continue to pass through the now-closed station. Roscommon railway station is now the nearest station and is located 10 km from Knockcroghery village. It is on the Westport-Dublin line, also serving indirect routes to Ballina, Galway and Ennis.

Knockcroghery is served by Bus Éireann's Route 440 (Westport-Athlone), with indirect routes to Galway, Dublin and other towns. The village is situated on the main N61 road between Athlone and Roscommon towns, and near the M6 Galway-Dublin motorway.

== Events and culture ==
=== The Gairm Sgoile of 1351 ===
During the days of Gaelic Ireland and of the Irish clans, there was a tradition similar to the first Welsh Eisteddfod in 1176. Irish clan chiefs would host feasts for their clansmen, servants, and warriors which centered around a contest between Irish-language bards, whose poetry was performed by professional singers accompanied by a harp. As in 12th-century Wales, the clan chief always chose the winner with the approval of those assembled. This tradition, which arose during the 14th century, was termed a Gairm Sgoile (Early Modern Irish: 'summoning', or 'gathering', 'of the [Bardic] school').

The traditional Irish phrase, "fáilte Uí Cheallaigh" ("an O'Kelly welcome") dates from Christmas Day, 1351 when Uilliam Buí Ó Ceallaigh, Chief of the Name of Clan Ó Ceallaigh and King of Uí Mháine, (which roughly covered what is now East County Galway and South County Roscommon) invited the poets, writers and artists of Ireland to a great feast at his seat, Gailey Castle. The feast reportedly lasted for a month. It was during this feast that the poet, Gofraidh Fionn Ó Dálaigh, wrote the poem, Filidh Éireann go hAointeach, which remembers the feast.

=== Knockcroghery Fair ===
Knockcroghery fair was traditionally held in late August and late October of each year. The October sheep fair remained popular throughout the 19th century, with 14,625 sheep for sale in 1841 and approximately 12,000 in 1860. It was generally a two-day event, with the first day confined to sheep, and cattle sold on the second day.

The fair green was on a gentle hill in the centre of the village. The lower end now forms the village green and the higher end is now the Greenhills housing estate. The fair ceased during the 1970s but was revived in 1992 as an annual festival held on the third weekend of September, incorporating a funfair, sheep fair and events. The revived fair continued each year until 2013.

A carnival also took place in Knockcroghery for two weeks each summer during the mid-20th century.

=== Galey Bay Regatta ===
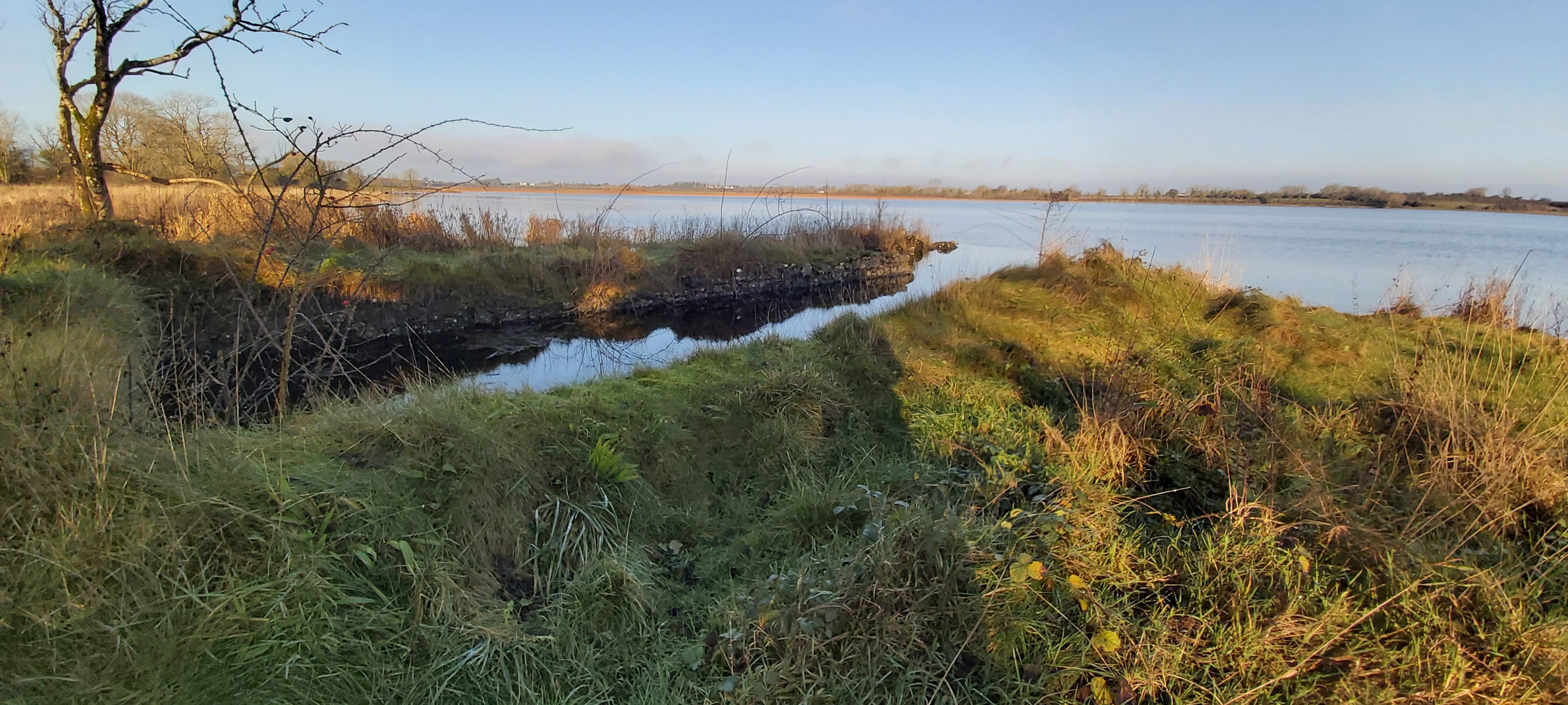
Remains of The Roscommon Club Boat House at Galey Bay

The Galey Bay Regatta, an annual yachting regatta, was held from 1872 until 1913 by the Lords Crofton, who constructed a boathouse on Galey Bay of Lough Ree adjoining Galey castle in 1881. Many visiting houseboats were anchored in the bay during the regatta. The yachts varied from 25-ton cutters to 18-foot spritsail lake boats. The regattas were the idea of Edward Crofton and his brother Alfred. After most of the lands had been sold to the adjoining farmers, the Croftons left the area and the regattas were no more. The Croftons were supported in organising the regattas by enthusiasts who came both from Lough Ree Yacht Club and Lough Derg. Lord Crofton was always the chairman of the organising committee.

=== Galey Castle dances ===
In the early 20th century, a wooden floor was installed in the boathouse at Galey Castle, approximately two metres above the level of the water below. Dances were held regularly in this boathouse, which were reputed to last "all day and all night", despite the prevailing laws at the time. In August 1932, while a dance was taking place, the aging floor began to give way. The dancefloor was prevented from falling completely into the water below by the presence of a cart underneath it. The dancers present were able to climb up to the door and make their escape.

=== Music ===
Peadar Kearney, writer of The Soldier's Song (Amhrán na bhFiann), also penned the song "Knockcroghery", when he was challenged to find a word to rhyme with the village's name.

=== Sport ===
The local GAA club, St Dominic's GAA, has its grounds on the Athlone side of the village. Notable players from the club include Roscommon's All-Ireland Football Championship-winning captain Jimmy Murray (1917–2007). He captained Roscommon to their only two All-Ireland senior football title wins in 1943 and 1944. A statue of Murray was installed on the village green in December 2024.

== See also ==
- List of towns and villages in Ireland
