= 2017 All-Ireland Senior Football Championship final =

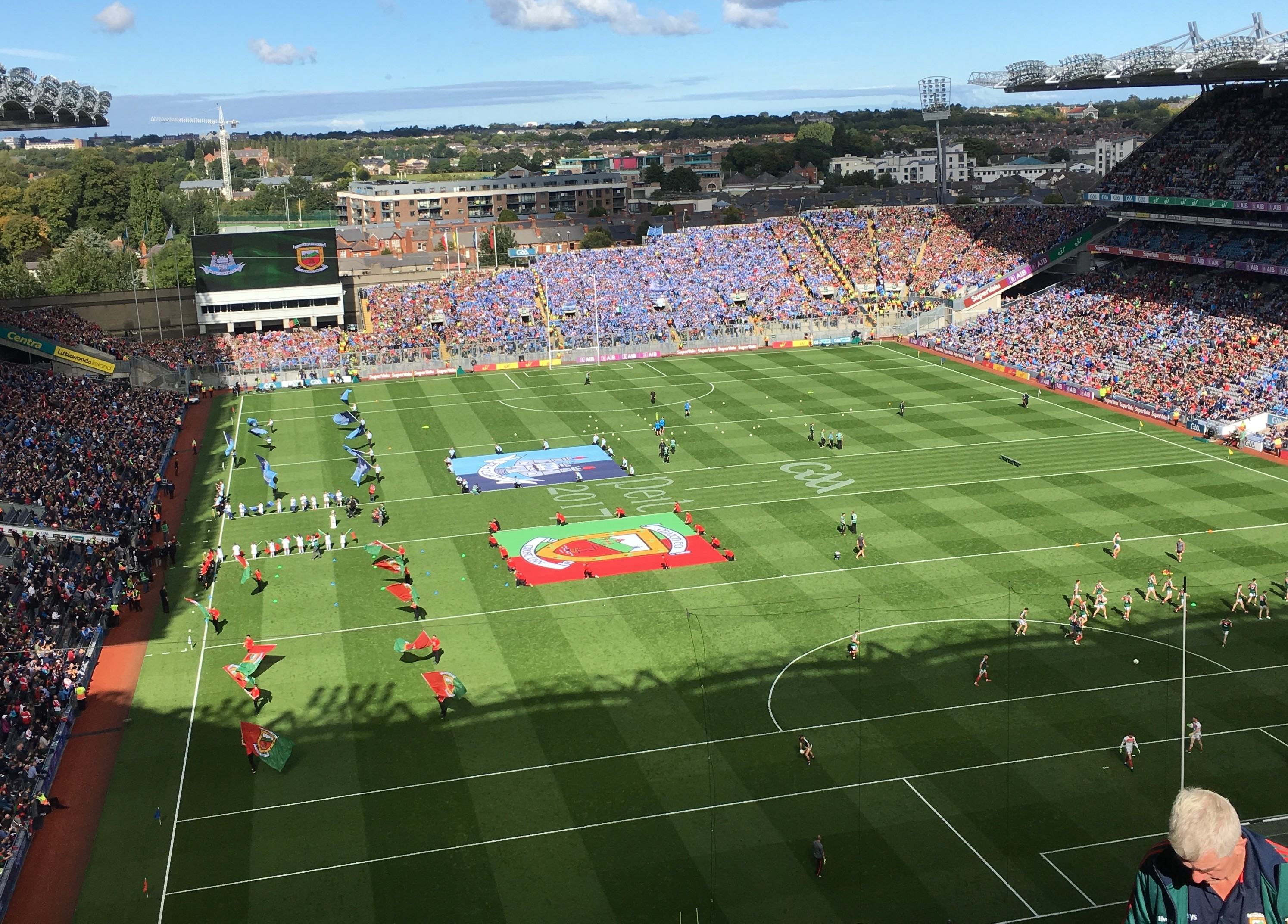
- Event: 2017 All-Ireland Senior Football Championship
Dublin	Mayo
1–17 (20)	1–16 (19)
- Date: 17 September 2017
- Venue: Croke Park, Dublin
- Man of the Match: James McCarthy
- Referee: Joe McQuillan (Cavan)
- Attendance: 82,243
- Weather: 16 °C, fine

The 2017 All-Ireland Senior Football Championship final was a Gaelic football match played at Croke Park in Dublin on 17 September 2017 between Dublin and Mayo, the culmination of the 2017 All-Ireland Senior Football Championship. It was the 130th final of that sport's primary competition, the All-Ireland Senior Football Championship.

This was the fourth occasion that the two counties met in the final, following matches in 1921, 2013 and 2016. Prior to the game, Dublin were seeking their third consecutive All-Ireland title, while Mayo were aiming for their first All-Ireland since 1951. The same two counties played in the ladies' All-Ireland final. This was only the second time that the final pairing had been the same in the men's and ladies' championships; the first time was in 1982, when Kerry played Offaly in the men's and ladies' finals. It was the second consecutive year that a team qualified under the system of second chances introduced in 2001; Mayo played despite defeat in its provincial championship.

Dublin won the final by a point on a 1–17 to 1–16 scoreline to claim their third title in a row, the first time this has happened since 1921–23.

The final was played before a capacity attendance of 82,243 people. The match drew a peak audience of 1.3 million, which made it the most watched RTÉ broadcast of 2017, surpassing the hurling final. The following year, Martin Breheny listed this as the fourth greatest All-Ireland Senior Football Championship Final.

The game was televised nationally on RTÉ2 as part of The Sunday Game live programme, presented by Michael Lyster from Croke Park, with studio analysis from Joe Brolly, Pat Spillane, and Colm O'Rourke. Match commentary was provided by Ger Canning with analysis by Dessie Dolan. The game was also televised internationally by Sky Sports, presented by Rachel Wyse and Brian Carney.

== Paths to the final ==
The two teams had widely varying paths to the final. Whereas Mayo struggled (losing to Galway, needing extra time to beat Derry and Cork and replays to beat Roscommon and Kerry), Dublin breezed to the final, winning their five games by 12, 31, 9, 10 and 12 points respectively.

=== Mayo ===
21 May 2017
14:00
Connacht Quarter-final

Mayo	2–14 – 0–11	Sligo
Cillian O’Connor 1–6 (0-5f), Diarmuid O’Connor 1–0, Fergal Boland and Andy Moran 0–2 each, Patrick Durcan, Kevin McLoughlin, Jason Doherty, Danny Kirby 0–1 each	Report	Adrian Marren 0–4 (0-2f, 1 '45), Mark Breheny (0-2f) and Stephen Coen 0–2 each, Aidan Devaney (0-1f), Paddy O'Connor, Niall Murphy 0–1 each

MacHale Park, Castlebar
Attendance: 14,661
Referee: Sean Hurson (Tyrone)
11 June 2017
16:00
Connacht Semi-final

Galway	0–15 – 1–11	Mayo
Sean Armstong 0–6 (3f, 3 '45), Damien Comer 0–2, G Sice 0–2 (2f), G Bradshaw, Johnny Heaney, Shane Walsh, Michael Daly, Eamonn Brannigan 0–1 each.	Report	Cillian O'Connor 0–6 (5f), Kevin McLoughlin 1–1, P Durcan, Fergal Boland, Diarmuid O'Connor, Andy Moran 0–1 each.

Pearse Stadium, Galway
Attendance: 22,046
Referee: Joe McQuillan (Cavan)
1 July 2017
5:00 pm
Qualifier Round 2A

Mayo	2–21 – 1–13 (AET)	Derry
Cillian O’Connor 0–12 (0-9f, 1 '45); Conor Loftus 1–1, Jason Doherty 1–1, Andy Moran 0–2, Kevin McLoughlin, Aidan O’Shea, Diarmuid O’Connor, Lee Keegan, Patrick Durcan 0–1 each	Report	Niall Loughlin 0–6 (5f), Mark Lynch 1–1, Ryan Bell 0–3, Benny Heron, James Kielt, Danny Heavron 0–1 each

MacHale Park, Castlebar
Attendance: 11,433
Referee: M Deegan (Laois)
8 July 2017
5.00 pm
Qualifier Round 3A

Mayo	2–14 – 0–13	Clare
Cillian O’Connor 1–5 (5f), Diarmuid O’Connor 1–1, Andy Moran 0–3, Kevin McLoughlin 0–2, Lee Keegan, Keith Higgins, and Aidan O’Shea 0–1 each	Report	David Tubridy 0–4 (4fs), Eoin Cleary 0–3 (2fs), Keelan Sexton 0–2 (1 45), Jamie Malone, Sean Collins, Gary Brennan, and Gearoid O’Brien 0–1 each

Cusack Park, Ennis
Attendance: 11,576
Referee: Sean Hurson (Tyrone)
22 July
5:00 pm
Qualifier Round 4A

Mayo	0–27 – 2–20 (AET)	Cork
Cillian O’Connor 0–11 (0-4f, 1 '45), Andy Moran 0–4, Aidan O’Shea 0–3, Patrick Durcan and Conor Loftus 0–2 each, Keith Higgins, Lee Keegan, Tom Parsons, Diarmuid O'Connor, Jason Doherty 0–1 each	Report	Donncha O'Connor 0–6 (0-4f), Luke Connolly 1–1 (0-1f), Sean Powter 1–0, John O'Rourke, Paul Kerrigan, Colm O'Neill (0-1f) 0–3 each, Michael Hurley 0–2, Tomas Clancy and Barry O'Driscoll 0–1 each

Gaelic Grounds, Limerick
Attendance: 13,505
Referee: Ciaran Branagan (Down)
30 July
4:00 pm
All-Ireland Quarter-final

Mayo	1–12 – 2–9	Roscommon
Lee Keegan 1–3, Cillian O'Connor 0–3 (0-2f), Patrick Durcan and Andy Moran 0–2 each, Colm Boyle and Jason Doherty 0–1 each	Report	Ciaran Murtagh 1–2 (0-2f), Fintan Cregg 1–1, Diarmuid Murtagh and Donie Smith (0-1f) 0–2 each, Enda Smith and Conor Devaney 0–1 each

Croke Park, Dublin
Attendance: 65,746
Referee: Joe McQuillan (Cavan)
7 August
2:00 pm
All-Ireland Quarter-final Replay

Mayo	4–19 – 0–9	Roscommon
Cillian O’Connor 1–6 (0-5f), Andy Moran 1–1, Keith Higgins and Kevin McLoughlin 1–0 each, Aidan O’Shea, Jason Doherty, Shane Nally 0–2 each, Donal Vaughan, Chris Barrett, Tom Parsons, Diarmuid O’Connor, David Drake, Stephen Coen 0–1 each	Report	Diarmuid Murtagh 0–4 (0-2f), Sean Mullooly, Enda Smith, Niall Kilroy, Conor Devaney, Donie Smith 0–1 each

Croke Park, Dublin
Attendance: 39,154
Referee: Anthony Nolan (Wicklow)
20 August
3:30 pm
All-Ireland Semi-final

Mayo	2–14 – 2–14	Kerry
Andy Moran 1–5, Cillian O’Connor 0–4 (0-1f), Colm Boyle 1–0, Tom Parsons 0–2, Donal Vaughan, Jason Doherty, Patrick Durcan 0–1 each	Report	Paul Geaney 0–7 (0-4f), Johnny Buckley, Stephen O’Brien 1–0 each, James O’Donoghue 0–3 (0-2f), Killian Young, Paul Murphy, Kieran Donaghy, Barry John Keane 0–1 each

Croke Park, Dublin
Attendance: 66,195
Referee: Maurice Deegan (Laois)
26 August
3:00 pm
All-Ireland Semi-final Replay

Mayo	2–16 – 0–17	Kerry
Cillian O'Connor 0-6f, Andy Moran 1–1, Diarmuid O'Connor 1–0, Jason Doherty 0–3 (0-1f, 1 '45), Kevin McLoughlin and Conor Loftus 0–2 each, Chris Barrett and Patrick Durcan 0–1 each	Report	Paul Geaney 0–9 (0-7f), James O'Donoghue 0–3 (0-1f), Jack Barry, Jonathan Lyne, Johnny Buckley, Fionn Fitzgerald 0–1 each

Croke Park, Dublin
Attendance: 53,032
Referee: David Gough (Meath)

=== Dublin ===
3 June 2017; 19:00; Leinster Quarter-final	Dublin	0–19 – 0–7	Carlow	O'Moore Park, Portlaoise; Attendance: 13,238; Referee: Sean Hurson (Tyrone); Man of the Match: Sean Murphy
3 June 2017; 19:00; Leinster Quarter-final	Dean Rock 0-6f, Ciaran Kilkenny 0–3, Jack McCaffrey, Con O’Callaghan (0-2f), Bernard Brogan 0–2 each, Niall Scully, Paul Mannion, Diarmuid Conolly (1 '45), Conor McHugh 0–1 each	Report	Paul Broderick 0-3f, Danny Moran, Brendan Murphy, Sean Murphy, Darragh Foley (0-1f) 0–1 each	O'Moore Park, Portlaoise; Attendance: 13,238; Referee: Sean Hurson (Tyrone); Man of the Match: Sean Murphy

25 June 2017; 4:00 pm Leinster Semi-final	Dublin	4–29 – 0–10	Westmeath	Croke Park; Attendance: 33,370; Referee: Conor Lane (Cork); Man of the Match: Paul Mannion
25 June 2017; 4:00 pm Leinster Semi-final	Dean Rock 1–5 (0-3f, 2 '45), Paul Mannion 0–8, Ciaran Kilkenny 1–3, Kevin McManamon 1–1, Con O’Callaghan 0–3, Eoghan O’Gara 1–0, Brian Fenton, Paddy Andrews, Bernard Brogan (0-1f), Shane B. Carthy 0–2 each, Jack McCaffrey 0–1.	Report	John Heslin 0–4 (0-3f), Kieran Martin 0–3, John Egan 0–2, Ger Egan 0–1	Croke Park; Attendance: 33,370; Referee: Conor Lane (Cork); Man of the Match: Paul Mannion

16 July 2017; 4:00 pm Leinster Final	Dublin	2–23 – 1–17	Kildare	Croke Park; Attendance: 66,734; Referee: Anthony Nolan (Wicklow); Man of the Match: Con O'Callaghan
16 July 2017; 4:00 pm Leinster Final	Con O’Callaghan 0–12 (0-6f), Bernard Brogan 0–5, James McCarthy, Dean Rock 1–0 each, Ciaran Kilkenny 0–2, Paul Mannion, Paddy Andrews, Shane B. Carthy, Brian Howard 0–1 each	Report	Paddy Brophy 1–3 (0-1f), Kevin Feely 0–5 (0-4f), Daniel Flynn and Cathal McNally 0–2 each, Johnny Byrne, Keith Cribbin, Niall Kelly, David Slattery, Fionn Dowling 0–1 each	Croke Park; Attendance: 66,734; Referee: Anthony Nolan (Wicklow); Man of the Match: Con O'Callaghan

5 August; 6:00 pm All-Ireland Quarter-final	Dublin	1–19 – 0–12	Monaghan	Croke Park, Dublin; Attendance: 82,000; Referee: Conor Lane (Cork); Man of the Match: Dean Rock
5 August; 6:00 pm All-Ireland Quarter-final	Dean Rock 1–8 (0-7f, 1 '45), Paul Mannion and Paddy Andrews 0–3 each, James McCarthy, Con O’Callaghan, Jack McCaffrey, Paul Flynn, Eoghan O’Gara 0–1 each	Report	Conor McManus 0–4 (0-3f), Conor McCarthy 0–3, Rory Beggan (0-1f), Colin Walshe, Karl O’Connell, Darren Hughes, Ryan McAnespie 0–1 each	Croke Park, Dublin; Attendance: 82,000; Referee: Conor Lane (Cork); Man of the Match: Dean Rock

27 August; 4:00 pm All-Ireland Semi-final	Dublin	2–17 – 0–11	Tyrone	Croke Park, Dublin; Attendance: 82,300; Referee: David Coldrick (Meath)
27 August; 4:00 pm All-Ireland Semi-final	Con O'Callaghan 1–2, Dean Rock 0–5 (0-4f), Eoghan O'Gara 1–1, Paul Flynn 0–3, Paddy Andrews 0–2, Jack McCaffrey, Brian Fenton, Ciaran Kilkenny, Paul Mannion 0–1 each	Report	Peter Harte 0–4 (0-3f), Colm Cavanagh and Niall Sludden 0–2 each, Tiernan McCann, Sean Cavanagh (0-1f), Declan McClure 0–1 each	Croke Park, Dublin; Attendance: 82,300; Referee: David Coldrick (Meath)

== Pre-match ==
=== Jubilee team ===
The Donegal team that won the 1992 All-Ireland Final were presented to the crowd before the match to mark 25 years. Jim McGuinness's son Mark Anthony represented him on the pitch because his father was based abroad (it was during his spell managing the association football club Beijing Sinobo Guoan in the Chinese Super League, the country's professional top tier). Mark Anthony held manager Brian McEniff by the hand as they walked out.

=== Ticketing ===
Demand for tickets was extremely high in both counties with Dublin and Mayo receiving around 32,000 tickets between them. Stand tickets were priced at €80 with terrace at €40.

=== Related events ===
The 2017 All-Ireland Minor Football Final was played between Kerry and Derry as a curtain-raiser to the senior final, with Kerry winning by 6–17 to 1–8.

== Match ==
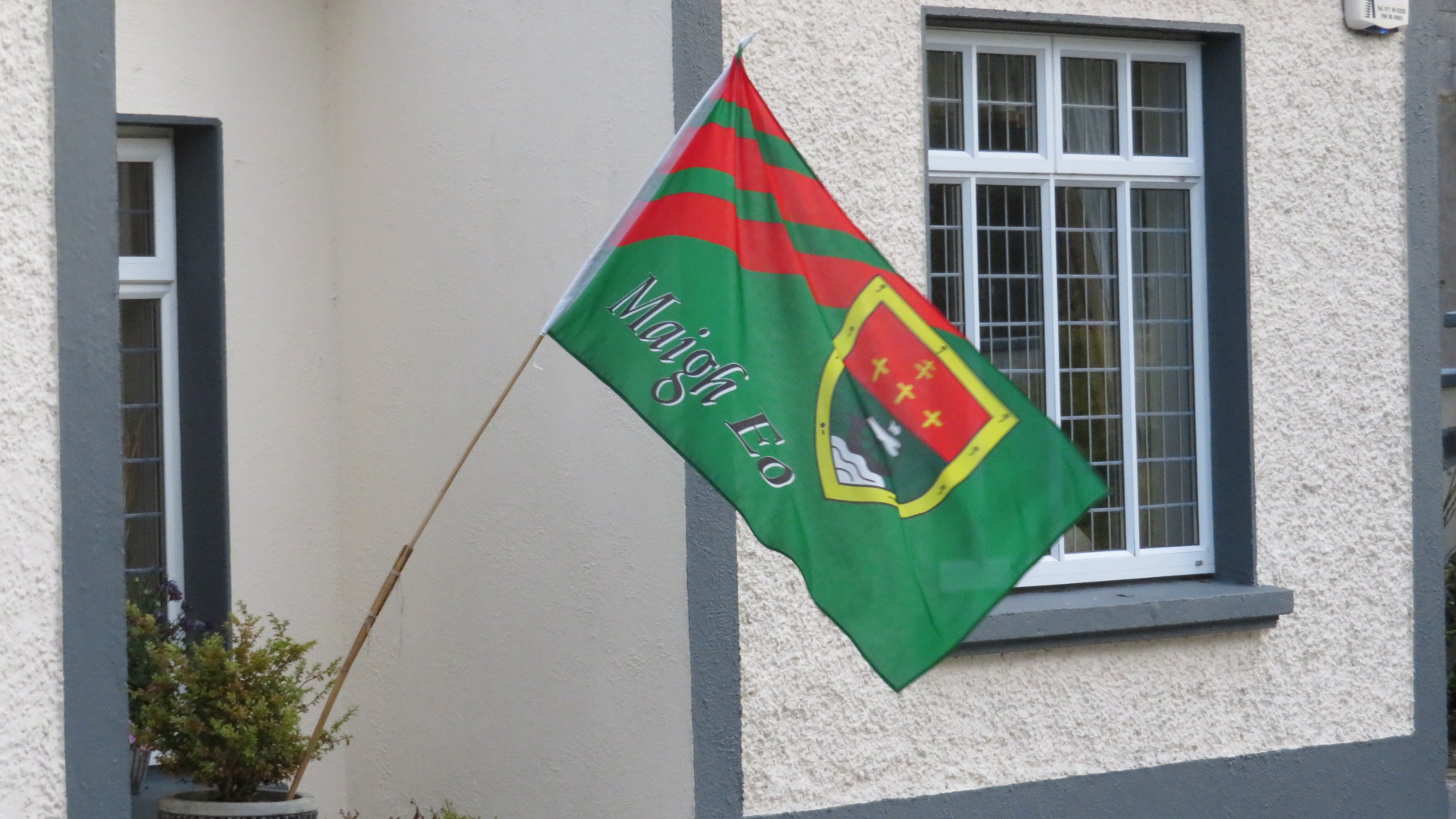
A Mayo flag flying on the day of the 2017 All-Ireland SFC final

=== Officials ===
On 4 September, Cavan's Joe McQuillan was confirmed as the referee for the final. It was McQuilllan's third All Ireland final having previously been in charge in 2011 and 2013. Cork's Conor Lane was the standby referee, the other linesman was Padraig O’Sullivan from Kerry and the Sideline official was Niall Cullen.

=== Build-up ===
The All-Ireland final was played between Dublin and Mayo, the second consecutive meeting of the teams in the decisive match. The reigning champions, Dublin, had defeated Mayo following a replay, and were looking to claim their third consecutive title. Dublin were favourites to win prior to throw-in. Pre-match discussion in the media revolved around the Mayo curse, a superstition held among GAA fans that Mayo will not win the All-Ireland until every member of the victorious 1951 team had died. The curse allegedly arose after a priest punished the team for celebrating rapturously in front of a funeral procession.

The game attracted additional international information as association football pundits Jeff Stelling and Chris Kamara made their commentary debut at a GAA game, alongside legendary GAA commentator Mícheál Ó Muircheartaigh.

=== Team news ===
Dublin and Mayo both named the same fifteen players that played in the semi-final wins for the final. Prior to the start of the match, Eoghan O'Gara was named to start for Dublin instead of Niall Scully, with Paddy Durcan also starting instead of Diarmuid O'Connor for Mayo.

=== Summary ===
The game took place in Croke Park before a capacity audience of 82,000. After 90 seconds of play, Dublin took a definitive lead as Con O'Callaghan scored a goal when he ran at the Mayo defence before shooting low along the ground to the corner of the net at the hill 16 end. However, despite this early three-point lead, Mayo played dominantly throughout the opening 35 minutes, scoring seven points from play to take a one-point lead in at half-time, 0–9 to 1–05. Andy Moran was responsible for three of these points, and his first-half performance was praised by pundits.

However, after the second half began, the game took on a different complexion as Dublin seized the lead by scoring three consecutive points. However, Mayo reclaimed the lead early into the half as Lee Keegan scored a goal to put his team one point ahead. The talking point of the match occurred in the 48th minute, as Dublin's John Small, who had previously received a yellow card in the first half, was sent off for a foul on Colm Boyle. However, Donal Vaughan of Mayo was also sent off after striking Small in the face in retaliation for the foul. This left both teams reduced to fourteen men for the remaining duration of the game. After seventy minutes of the game had elapsed, the teams were tied at 1–16 apiece, and it appeared that the game was destined for a draw and replay. In the seventy-first minute, Mayo were awarded a kickable free and an opportunity to go ahead. Cillian O'Connor, who had missed a free under a similar scenario in the previous final, took the kick, and missed, having it strike the post and rebound away from goal. Then, with a mere minute of the six additional minutes remaining, Diarmuid Connolly was fouled approximately forty-five metres from the Mayo goal, leaving Dublin with a kick to win the game. Dean Rock, the son of Barney Rock, one of the most famous Gaelic footballers from the capital, took the free. Lee Keegan controversially threw a GPS device at Rock as he took the free, yet the Dubliner was undeterred and converted. This left the defending champions one point ahead. Ciarán Kilkenny was then given a black card as Dublin looked to win the Mayo kickout. With Dublin now down to 13 men, they reclaiming possession as David Clarke kicked the ball over the Cusack stand sideline. Dublin maintained possession for approximately 90 seconds until the final whistle was blown. Stephen Cluxton, the Dublin captain, then lifted the Sam Maguire Cup for the fifth time in seven years.

=== Details ===
17 September 2017
3:30 pm

Dublin	1–17 – 1–16	Mayo
Dean Rock 0–7 (0-3f); Con O’Callaghan 1–0; Paul Mannion 0–3; James McCarthy 0–2; John Small 0–1; Brian Fenton 0–1; Eoghan O’Gara 0–1; Diarmuid Connolly 0–1; Kevin McManamon 0–1	Report	Cillian O’Connor 0–7 (0-4f); Lee Keegan 1–0; Andy Moran 0–3; Kevin McLoughlin 0–2; Jason Doherty 0–2; Donal Vaughan 0–1; Colm Boyle 0–1

Croke Park, Dublin
Attendance: 82,243
Referee: Joe McQuillan (Cavan)

Dublin	Mayo

GK	1	Stephen Cluxton (c)
CB	2	Philly McMahon	(yellow card) 60'
FB	4	Michael Fitzsimons
CB	5	Jonny Cooper
WB	6	John Small	(yellow card) 27,48' (yellow-red card)
HB	3	Cian O'Sullivan
WB	7	Jack McCaffrey	(substituted off) 10'
MF	8	Brian Fenton
MF	9	James McCarthy
WF	10	Ciarán Kilkenny	70+5'
HF	11	Con O'Callaghan	(substituted off) 68'
WF	13	Paul Mannion	(yellow card) 17' (substituted off) 70+1'
CF	14	Paddy Andrews	(substituted off) 36'
FF	26	Eoghan O'Gara	(substituted off) 36'
CF	15	Dean Rock
Substitutes:
GK	16	Evan Comerford
FW	12	Niall Scully	(substituted on) 68' (yellow card) 70+5'
FW	17	Bernard Brogan	(substituted on) 65'
DF	18	David Byrne
FW	19	Diarmuid Connolly	(substituted on) 36'
FW	20	Cormac Costello	(substituted on) 70+4' (yellow card) 70+6'
DF	21	Darren Daly
FW	22	Paul Flynn	(substituted on) 10' (substituted off) 65'
DF	23	Eric Lowndes
MF	24	Michael Darragh MacAuley
FW	25	Kevin McManamon	(substituted on) 36'
Manager:
Jim Gavin

GK	1	David Clarke
CB	6	Chris Barrett
FB	2	Brendan Harrison
CB	4	Keith Higgins	(substituted off) 70+6'
WB	5	Lee Keegan	(yellow card) 27'
HB	7	Colm Boyle	(yellow card) 35+4' (substituted off) 56'
WB	18	Patrick Durcan
MF	8	Séamus O'Shea	(substituted off) 50'
MF	9	Tom Parsons
WF	10	Kevin McLoughlin	(substituted off) 70+5'
HF	11	Aidan O'Shea
WF	3	Donal Vaughan	(red card) 48'
CF	13	Jason Doherty	(substituted off) 70'
FF	15	Andy Moran	(substituted off) 63'
CF	14	Cillian O'Connor (c)
Substitutes:
GK	16	Rob Hennelly
FW	12	Diarmuid O'Connor	(substituted on) 50'
DF	17	Ger Cafferkey	(substituted on) 70+6'
DF	19	Stephen Coen	(substituted on) 56'
DF	20	David Drake	(substituted on) 70'
DF	21	Shane Nally
FW	22	Danny Kirby	(substituted on) 70+5'
FW	23	Conor Loftus	(substituted on) 63'
MF	24	Conor O'Shea
MF	25	Barry Moran
FW	26	Alan Dillon
Manager:
Stephen Rochford

Man of the Match:
James McCarthy

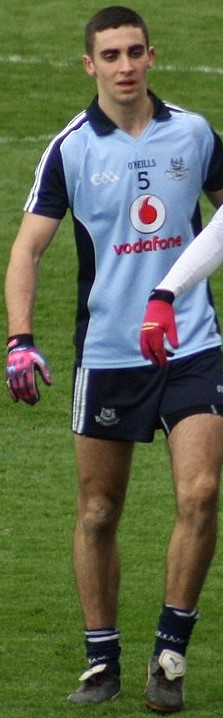
James McCarthy received the man of the match award.

=== Trophy presentation ===
Dublin captain Stephen Cluxton accepted the Sam Maguire Cup from GAA president Aogán Ó Fearghail in the Hogan Stand. Cluxton was making a record 91st championship appearances and lifted the cup for a record fourth time. He was one of 12 Dublin players who collected their fifth senior All-Ireland winners medal. The 12 Dublin players became the only men outside of Kerry to win five senior All-Ireland winners medals in Gaelic football.

=== Reaction ===
Highlights of the final were shown on The Sunday Game programme which aired at 9:30 pm that night on RTÉ2 and was presented by Des Cahill. James McCarthy, Dean Rock and Chris Barrett were shortlisted for the Man of the Match award. The winner was James McCarthy with GAA president Aogán Ó Fearghail presenting the award at the Dublin post match function, held in the Gibson hotel.

In 2020, Colm Keys of the Irish Independent ranked the match third—best among All-Ireland finals—in his list of the top 10 Gaelic football games of the 2010s.

=== Celebrations ===
The Dublin team had a homecoming celebration the day after the final at Smithfield in Dublin which started at 6:30 pm. The night before, players and their management team celebrated their win at The Gibson Hotel.
