= 2016 All-Ireland Senior Football Championship final =

- Event: 2016 All-Ireland Senior Football Championship
| Dublin | Mayo |
| 2–9 (15) | 0–15 (15) |
- Date: 18 September 2016
- Venue: Croke Park, Dublin
- Man of the Match: John Small
- Referee: Conor Lane (Cork)
- Weather: 16°C, fine

2016 All-Ireland Senior Football Championship final replay
| Dublin | Mayo |
| 1–15 (18) | 1–14 (17) |
- Date: 1 October 2016
- Venue: Croke Park, Dublin
- Man of the Match: Michael Fitzsimons
- Referee: Maurice Deegan (Laois)
- Weather: Showers which cleared

The 2016 All-Ireland Senior Football Championship final was a Gaelic football match played at Croke Park in Dublin on 18 September 2016 (and replayed on 1 October 2016) between Dublin and Mayo, the culmination of the 2016 All-Ireland Senior Football Championship. It was the 129th final of that sport's primary competition, the All-Ireland Senior Football Championship.

Reigning title holder Dublin and qualifier winner Mayo competed for the Sam Maguire Cup, in a repeat of the 2013 final. Mayo qualified despite defeat in its provincial championship, under the system of second chances introduced in 2001. The first match ended in a draw, Mayo 0–15 Dublin 2–9. The replay finished Dublin 1–15 Mayo 1–14, meaning Dublin retained the Sam Maguire Cup for the first time since 1977. This was the eighth All-Ireland decider that Mayo had lost since their previous success in 1951.

The game was televised nationally by RTÉ2 as part of The Sunday Game live programme, presented by Michael Lyster from Croke Park, with studio analysis from Joe Brolly, Pat Spillane, and Colm O'Rourke.

== Background ==
Dublin entered the final having won the Leinster championship (by defeating Laois, Meath and Westmeath) and then overcoming the challenges presented by both Donegal and Kerry. Mayo became the first team to reach the final via the qualifier route since 2010, when both Cork and Down did so. In doing so they overcame London then lost to Galway in the Connacht Championship, then overcame Fermanagh, Kildare Westmeath, Tyrone and Tipperary.

Demand for tickets for the final was extremely high. There was no general sale, with all tickets being distributed via the county boards and clubs. The GAA warned that the holders of any tickets that becomes known to them as having been bought on the black market could be denied entry to the match.

Conor Lane of Cork refereed the first match, his first All-Ireland senior final. Both teams named their line-ups during the week. This left Dublin unchanged from their semi-final win over Kerry, while Mayo had Tom Parsons take to the pitch in place of Barry Moran.

== Delayed entry ==
Dublin delayed entry onto the field of play for the first match. They were scheduled as the first of the teams onto the pitch at 14:56, according to Croke Park's strict timetable. However, they informed stewards they would enter the field of play at 15:00, though then did not do so until 15:02. Mayo, scheduled for entry at 14:58 (two minutes later after Dublin's scheduled time of entry) were then asked enter the pitch earlier than their scheduled time. In the end both teams ran onto the pitch at the same time, though Dublin muscled aside Mayo to make the bench for the team photograph.

== Match 1 ==
=== Summary ===
Mayo started well, taking two points through Tom Parsons and Cillian O'Connor. The first goal of the match came in the 9th minute, when the ball hit Mayo's Kevin McLoughlin and trickled over the line for Dublin. O'Connor leveled the match with another point before the 23rd minute, which saw the ball bounce off Colm Boyle's leg and over the line for another goal to Dublin's advantage. Donal Vaughan pulled a point back for Mayo and shortly after, James McCarthy was black carded for tackling O'Connor off the ball. In the 28th minute, Aidan O'Shea put the ball in the Dublin net but was penalised for fouling Dublin's Jonny Cooper. No Dublin player scored until the 31st minute when Rock tapped over a free. Dublin's first point from play came as the half concluded. It was by Paddy Andrews, who had replaced McCarthy, and Andrews's point was swiftly followed by another from him. These were Dublin's only scores from play in the first half. A single point from Jason Doherty wrapped up the first half with Dublin leading by five points.

Andy Moran opened the scoring in the second half, starting a run of five successive points for Mayo. Further points by Patrick Durcan and O'Connor levelled the match on 45 minutes. Brian Fenton and Rock pushed Dublin ahead, but by the 61st minute the game was again level, with Alan Dillon equalising to bring the scoreline to Dublin 2–6 Mayo 0–12. A string of three points by John Small, Rock and Diarmuid Connolly towards the end of normal time meant that Dublin were leading by two points. Seven minutes of additional time were announced just before the end of normal time, though ultimately more than that was played. Vaughan's point on 70+2 minutes and O'Connor's 44 yd (40 m) kick in the final minute set the final up for a replay. The final score was unusual for a drawn match in that, taking own goals into account, 21 of the 30 points were scored by players of one team.

=== Details ===
18 September 2016
15:30 IST

| Dublin | 2–09 – 0–15 | Mayo |
|---|---|---|
| Dean Rock (0–4); Paddy Andrews (0–2); John Small 0-1; Brian Fenton 0-1; Diarmuid Connolly 0–1; Kevin McLoughlin 1–0 own goal Colm Boyle 1–0 own goal | Report | Cillian O’Connor (0–7); Donal Vaughan 0-2; Alan Moran 0–2; Patrick Durcan 0-1; Tom Parsons 0-1; Alan Dillon 0-1; Jason Doherty 0–1 |

Croke Park, Dublin
Attendance: 82,257
Referee: Conor Lane (Cork)

| Dublin | Mayo |

| GK | 1 | Stephen Cluxton (c) |
| CB | 2 | Philly McMahon |
| FB | 3 | Jonny Cooper |
| CB | 4 | David Byrne | | (substituted off) 66' |
| WB | 5 | James McCarthy | | 24' |
| HB | 6 | Cian O'Sullivan |
| WB | 7 | John Small |
| MF | 8 | Brian Fenton |
| MF | 9 | Michael Darragh MacAuley | | (substituted off) 53' |
| WF | 10 | Paul Flynn | | (substituted off) 74' |
| HF | 11 | Kevin McManamon | (yellow card) 4' | (substituted off) 47' |
| WF | 12 | Ciarán Kilkenny |
| CF | 13 | Dean Rock |
| FF | 14 | Diarmuid Connolly | (yellow card) 61' |
| CF | 15 | Bernard Brogan | | (substituted off) 62' |
Substitutes:
| GK | 16 | Michael Savage |
| FW | 17 | Paddy Andrews | | (substituted on) 24' |
| MF | 18 | Denis Bastick | | (substituted on) 74' |
| DF | 19 | Tomás Brady |
| FW | 20 | Cormac Costello |
| DF | 21 | Darren Daly | | (substituted on) 66' |
| DF | 22 | Michael Fitzsimons | | (substituted on) 53' |
| DF | 23 | Eric Lowndes |
| FW | 24 | Paul Mannion | | (substituted on) 47' |
| FW | 25 | Con O'Callaghan |
| FW | 26 | Eoghan O'Gara | | (substituted on) 62' |
Manager:
Jim Gavin

| GK | 1 | David Clarke |
| CB | 2 | Brendan Harrison |
| FB | 3 | Donal Vaughan |
| CB | 4 | Keith Higgins |
| WB | 5 | Lee Keegan | (yellow card) 61' |
| HB | 6 | Colm Boyle | | (substituted off) 58' |
| WB | 7 | Patrick Durcan |
| MF | 8 | Séamus O'Shea | | (substituted off) 54' |
| MF | 9 | Tom Parsons |
| WF | 10 | Kevin McLoughlin |
| HF | 11 | Aidan O'Shea |
| WF | 12 | Diarmuid O'Connor | | (substituted off) 67' |
| CF | 13 | Jason Doherty |
| FF | 14 | Andy Moran | | (substituted off) 71' |
| CF | 15 | Cillian O'Connor (c) |
Substitutes:
| GK | 16 | Rob Hennelly |
| DF | 17 | Chris Barrett | | (substituted on) 58' |
| DF | 18 | Kevin Keane |
| MF | 19 | Stephen Coen | | (substituted on) 67' |
| FW | 20 | Evan Regan | | (substituted on) 71' (substituted off) 79' |
| DF | 21 | David Drake |
| FW | 22 | Alan Dillon | | (substituted on) 54' (substituted off) 67' |
| FW | 23 | Conor O'Shea |
| MF | 24 | Barry Moran | | (substituted on) 67' |
| FW | 25 | Alan Freeman |
| FW | 26 | Conor Loftus | | (substituted on) 79' |
Manager:
Stephen Rochford

Man of the Match:
John Small (Dublin)

== Match 2 ==
=== Summary ===
By the 6th minute, Dublin had stormed ahead and led by four points through Dean Rock and Kevin McManamon. Mayo came back with points from Patrick Durcan, Cillian O'Connor and Andy Moran to tie the game. Two free kicks by Rock gave Dublin back the lead but was undone when Mayo's Lee Keegan scored the first goal of the match from 14 yd (13 m). Dublin suffered a further setback when Jonny Cooper was black carded for tripping Donal Vaughan. Goalscorer Keegan was also black carded late into the first half for impeding Diarmuid Connolly. However, Dublin finished strongly, taking another four points to lead by a single point at half time.

The second half was equally tense, as Mayo regained the lead briefly before Dublin took control. Mayo goalkeeper Rob Hennelly was black carded for pulling down Paddy Andrews and the subsequent penalty by Connolly made the score 1–11 1–08 in favour of Dublin. The three point lead was one Mayo was unable to overturn. Mayo replied with points from O'Connor, Kevin McLoughlin and Durcan but substitutes Bernard Brogan and Cormac Costello kept Dublin ahead. Dublin led 1–14 1–13 on 70 minutes, with an additional six minutes of injury time. Late into injury time, Mayo's point scoring hero from the first match, O'Connor had an opportunity to level the match and send the game into extra time, but his 44 yd (40 m) free kick missed the target and went wide. The win ensured that Dublin retained the cup for the first time since 1977.

=== Details ===
1 October 2016
17:00 IST

| Dublin | 1–15 – 1–14 | Mayo |
|---|---|---|
| Dean Rock 0–9; Diarmuid Connolly 1–1; Cormac Costello 0–3; Kevin McManamon 0-1; Bernard Brogan 0–1 | Report | Cillian O'Connor 0–9; Lee Keegan 1–0; Patrick Durcan 0–2; Andy Moran 0-1; Diarmuid O'Connor 0-1; Kevin McLoughlin 0–1 |

Croke Park, Dublin
Attendance: 82,249
Referee: Maurice Deegan (Laois)

| Dublin | Mayo |

| GK | 1 | Stephen Cluxton (c) |
| CB | 2 | Philly McMahon |
| FB | 3 | Jonny Cooper | | 21' |
| CB | 22 | Michael Fitzsimons |
| WB | 5 | James McCarthy |
| HB | 6 | Cian O'Sullivan | | (substituted off) 72' |
| WB | 7 | John Small | (yellow card) 35+4' | (substituted off) 60' |
| MF | 8 | Brian Fenton | (yellow card) 31' |
| MF | 10 | Paul Flynn | (yellow card) 47' |
| WF | 12 | Ciarán Kilkenny |
| HF | 14 | Diarmuid Connolly | (yellow card) 35+4' |
| WF | 24 | Paul Mannion | | (substituted off) 52' |
| CF | 13 | Dean Rock |
| FF | 17 | Paddy Andrews | | (substituted off) 47' |
| CF | 11 | Kevin McManamon | | (substituted off) 56' |
Substitutes:
| GK | 16 | Michael Savage |
| DF | 4 | David Byrne | | (substituted on) 21' |
| MF | 9 | Michael Darragh MacAuley | | (substituted on) 52' |
| FW | 15 | Bernard Brogan | | (substituted on) 47' |
| MF | 18 | Denis Bastick |
| DF | 19 | Tomás Brady |
| FW | 20 | Cormac Costello | | (substituted on) 56' |
| DF | 21 | Darren Daly | | (substituted on) 72' |
| DF | 23 | Eric Lowndes | | (substituted on) 60' |
| FW | 25 | Con O'Callaghan |
| FW | 26 | Eoghan O'Gara |
Manager:
Jim Gavin

| GK | 16 | Rob Hennelly | | 41' |
| CB | 2 | Brendan Harrison |
| FB | 3 | Donal Vaughan | (yellow card) 35+4' | (substituted off) HT' |
| CB | 4 | Keith Higgins |
| WB | 5 | Lee Keegan | | 35+1' |
| HB | 6 | Colm Boyle | | (substituted off) 71' |
| WB | 7 | Patrick Durcan |
| MF | 8 | Séamus O'Shea |
| MF | 9 | Tom Parsons |
| WF | 10 | Kevin McLoughlin |
| HF | 11 | Aidan O'Shea |
| WF | 12 | Diarmuid O'Connor |
| CF | 13 | Jason Doherty | | (substituted off) 60' |
| FF | 14 | Andy Moran | | (substituted off) 55' |
| CF | 15 | Cillian O'Connor (c) |
Substitutes:
| GK | 1 | David Clarke | | (substituted on) 41' |
| DF | 17 | Chris Barrett | | (substituted on) 71' |
| DF | 18 | Kevin Keane |
| MF | 19 | Stephen Coen | | (substituted on) 35+1' |
| FW | 20 | Evan Regan |
| DF | 21 | David Drake |
| FW | 22 | Alan Dillon | | (substituted on) 60' |
| FW | 23 | Conor O'Shea | | (substituted on) HT' |
| MF | 24 | Barry Moran | | (substituted on) 55' |
| FW | 25 | Alan Freeman |
| FW | 26 | Conor Loftus |
Manager:
Stephen Rochford

Man of the Match:
Michael Fitzsimons (Dublin)

== Reaction ==
Dublin manager Jim Gavin speaking after the match was satisfied with the performance of the team after a long season saying "What is it now, the 40th week of the year, and we’ve been back since the second week in January, our first game in the O’Byrne Cup, so in terms of the intercounty cycle, it’s been a long season of giving it everything. And I couldn’t ask for any more from the players, and particularly from the management team, the backroom and the support team there who pushed really hard during the season, particularly the last two weeks (since the drawn game) to do their very best for the player group. Everybody's pushing to get these players to be their best, and there's been a really collective togetherness about the squad this year, and we gave it our all. If it didn't work out for us on Saturday I would have no complaints because everybody just gave their all. That's all we ever ask: from myself, or the backroom team, or the players.”

Mayo goalkeeper Rob Hennelly, who was named in the team as a late replacement for David Clarke and subsequently conceded a penalty and was then black carded, revealed his heartache after the final with a post on Instagram, saying "I'll never be able to fully describe what was going through my head at this moment. What I was expecting to be one of my best days turned out to be the opposite, and it breaks my heart I didn't come through for my team and county".

Mayo manager Stephen Rochford speaking after the match said "We did our analysis on Dublin. They had pushed with a formation in the first game, pushing four guys inside. They were trying to cut off our short kick-out and as the game developed in the drawn game they were getting more comfort or more reward and it was probably something they were going to try and maximise further. Robbie's kick-out gave us a bit more length, a bit more option and that was the reason behind it, When you look at a one-point defeat you look at every single play, every single decision, every single moment in it and question what could have been. That’s just the way it is.”

== Trophy presentation ==
Dublin captain Stephen Cluxton accepted the Sam Maguire Cup from GAA president Aogán Ó Fearghail in the Hogan Stand.

== Celebrations ==
The Dublin team had a homecoming celebration on 2 October at Smithfield in Dublin which started at 4:30pm. The night before, players and their management team celebrated their win at The Gibson Hotel.

== Broadcasting ==
Both matches were shown live on television in Ireland on The Sunday Game. RTÉ television coverage was presented by Michael Lyster from Croke Park, with studio analysis from Joe Brolly, Pat Spillane, and Colm O'Rourke. Match commentary was by Ger Canning with comments by Martin Carney. Sky Sports also showed the match live with Rachel Wyse and Brian Carney presenting and Peter Canavan, Jim McGuinness and James Horan providing in-studio analysis.
