= 2023 All-Ireland Senior Football Championship final =

Football match

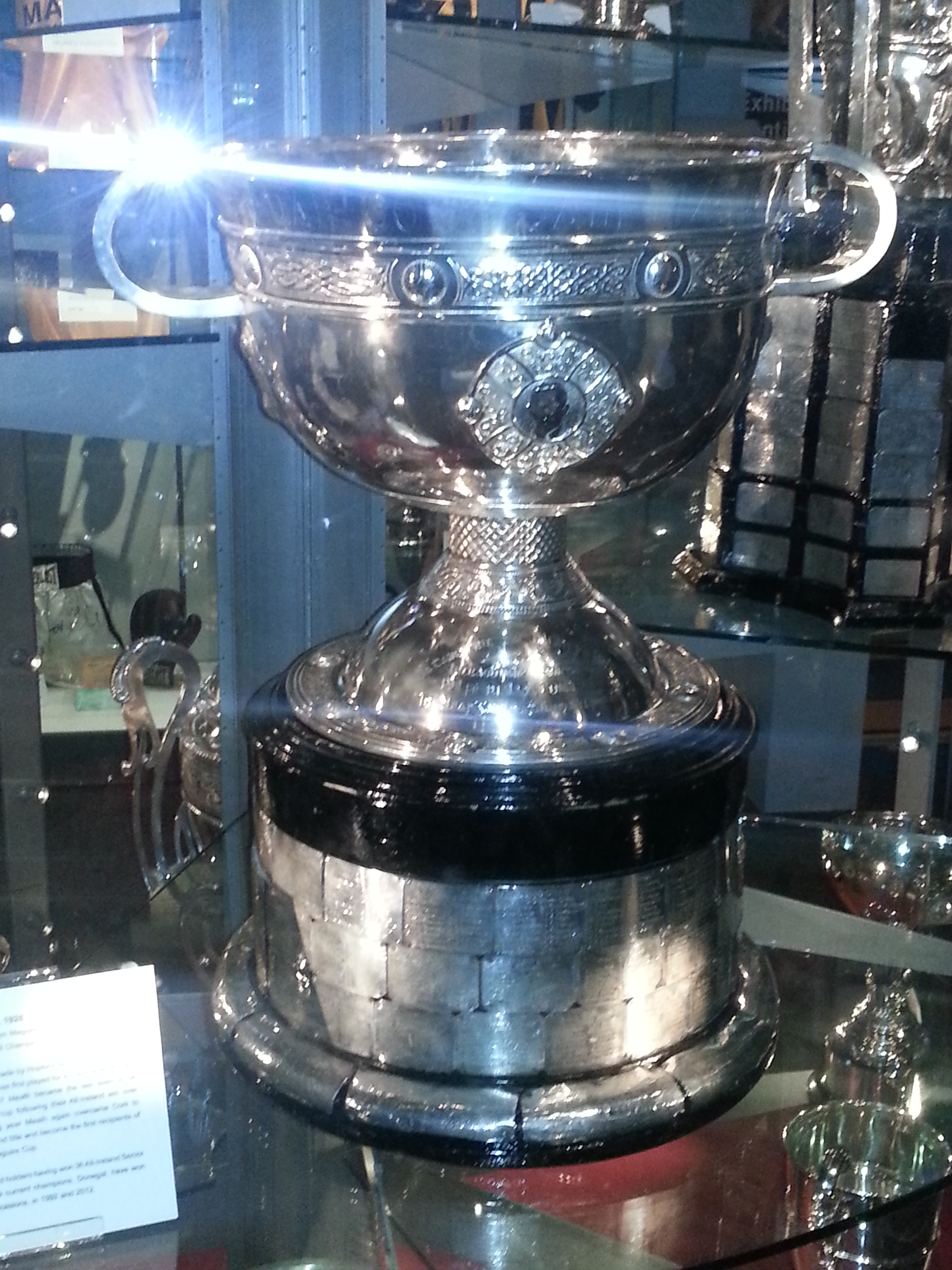
- Event: 2023 All-Ireland Senior Football Championship
Dublin	Kerry
1–15 (18)	1–13 (16)
- Date: 30 July 2023
- Venue: Croke Park, Dublin
- Man of the Match: Paul Mannion
- Referee: David Gough (Meath)
- Attendance: 82,300
- Weather: Mostly cloudy with showers 17 °C (63 °F)

The 2023 All-Ireland Senior Football Championship final was a Gaelic football match played at Croke Park in Dublin on 30 July 2023 between Dublin and Kerry, the culmination of the 2023 All-Ireland Senior Football Championship. It was the 136th final of that sport's primary competition, the All-Ireland Senior Football Championship.

Defending champion Kerry lost to Leinster champion Dublin by two points, on a scoreline of 1–15 to 1–13 to claim their 31st title.

The game was televised nationally on RTÉ2 as part of The Sunday Game live programme, presented by Joanne Cantwell from the Croke Park studio, with analysis from Ciarán Whelan, Peter Canavan and Tomás Ó Sé. Match commentary was provided by Darragh Maloney, assisted by Éamonn Fitzmaurice. The game was also televised on BBC Two and internationally on GAAGO for the first time. BBC coverage was presented by Croke Park by Sarah Mulkerrins for the first time with punditry by Mickey Harte, Oisin McConville and Michael Murphy in the studio, Thomas Niblock and Philly McMahon on commentary and Orla Bannon pitch-side.

An average of 971,000 people watched the game, with a peak figure of 1.24 million as the match reached its climax. The game received a 77% audience share.

== Background ==
Kerry were aiming to retain the All-Ireland title, which they have not done since 2006–2007.

Dublin have won the last nine All-Ireland SFC finals they appeared in (1995, 2011, 2013, 2015–20); they have not lost a final since 1994.

Kerry and Dublin had met in 14 previous All-Ireland finals, with Kerry winning eight of these and Dublin six.

Between them, the two counties have the majority of All-Ireland Senior Football Championships: Kerry having 38 wins (the last in 2022) and Dublin having 30 (the last in 2020). Adding in 2023, this gives a total of 69, out of 136 years in which the All-Ireland Senior Football Championship has been completed.

== Paths to the final ==
=== Dublin ===
23 April 2023 Leinster quarter-final	Laois	2–9 – 4–30	Dublin	Portlaoise
3:30pm		Report		Stadium: Laois Hire O'Moore Park; Referee: Barry Judge (Sligo)

30 April 2023 Leinster semi-final	Kildare	0–12 – 0–14	Dublin	Dublin
				Stadium: Croke Park; Attendance: 30,499; Referee: Fergal Kelly (Longford)

14 May 2023 Leinster final	Louth	0–15 – 5–21	Dublin	Dublin
	S Mulroy (0-10, 7f, 1'45), C Grimes (0-2), L Jackson (0-1), C Downey (0-1), C Lennon (0-1)	Report	S Bugler (1-3), C Costello (0-5, 3f, 1'45), P Mannion (1-1, 1f), C O'Callaghan (0-4), C Kilkenny (0-3), J McCarthy (1-0), C Basquel (1-0), P Small (1-0), J McCaffrey (0-2), J Small (0-1), S McMahon (0-1), D Rock (0-1)	Stadium: Croke Park; Attendance: 40,115; Referee: Conor Lane (Cork)

28 May 2023 All-Ireland group stage	Dublin	1–11 – 0–14	Roscommon	Dublin
16:00 IST (UTC+1)	Cormac Costello 0–7 (0–2f, 0–2 '45), John Small 1–0, Seán Bugler 0–2, Con O'Callaghan 0–2	Report	Ciaráin Murtagh 0–5 (0–2f), Diarmuid Murtagh 0–3 (0–2f), Ciarán Lennon 0–2, Donie Smith 0–1 (0–1f), Conor Cox 0–1 (0–1f), Niall Daly 0–1, Enda Smith 0–1	Stadium: Croke Park; Attendance: 30,802; Referee: Barry Cassidy

3 June 2023 All-Ireland group stage	Kildare	0–13 – 0–22	Dublin	Kilkenny
17:00 IST (UTC+1)	Neil Flynn 0–5 (0–1f), Ben McCormack 0–3, Paddy Woodgate 0–1 (0–1f), Kevin Feely 0–1 (0–1m), Kevin O'Callaghan 0–1, Aaron Masterson 0–1, Darragh Kirwan 0–1	Report	Colm Basquel 0–5, Dean Rock 0–4 (0–2f), Con O'Callaghan 0–4, Seán Bugler 0–3, Paul Mannion 0–2, Brian Fenton 0–1, Niall Scully 0–1, Killian O'Gara 0–1, Tom Lahiff 0–1	Stadium: UPMC Nowlan Park; Attendance: 8,216; Referee: Sean Hurson

18 June 2023 All-Ireland group stage	Dublin	3–23 – 0–8	Sligo	Cavan
13:45 IST (UTC+1)	Con O'Callaghan 1–5, Colm Basquel 1–3 (0–1f), Paddy Small 0–5 (0–3f), Lee Gannon 0–3, Eoin Murchan 1–0, Seán Bugler 0–2, Paul Mannion 0–2, Brian Howard 0–1, John Small 0–1, Ciarán Kilkenny 0–1	Report	Sean Carrabine 0–4 (0–2f, 0–1 '45), Niall Murphy 0–2, Darragh Cummins 0–1, Patrick O'Connor 0–1	Stadium: Kingspan Breffni; Referee: Niall Cullen

2 July 2023 All-Ireland quarter-final	Dublin	2–17 – 0–11	Mayo	Dublin
16:00 IST (UTC+1)	Colm Basquel 2–2, Cormac Costello 0–5 (0–3f), James McCarthy 0–2, Paul Mannion 0–2, Con O'Callaghan 0–2, Brian Fenton 0–1, Ciarán Kilkenny 0–1, Paddy Small 0–1, Dean Rock 0–1	Report	Ryan O'Donoghue 0–5 (0–2f), Tommy Conroy 0–2, Aidan O'Shea 0–1 (0–1f), Colm Reape 0–1 (0–1 '45), Paddy Durcan 0–1, Jordan Flynn 0–1	Stadium: Croke Park; Referee: David Gough

15 July 2023 All-Ireland semi-final	Dublin	1–17 – 0–13	Monaghan	Dublin
17:30 IST (UTC+1)	Cormac Costello 0–7 (0–3f 0–1m), Dean Rock 1–1 (0–1f), Paul Mannion 0–2 (0–1m), Con O'Callaghan 0–2, Brian Fenton 0–2, Jack McCaffrey 0–1, Paddy Small 0–1, Lee Gannon 0–1	Report	Conor McManus 0–5 (0–2f, 0–1m), Rory Beggan 0–3 (0–3 '45), Gary Mohan 0–1, Micheál Bannigan 0–1, Stephen O'Hanlon 0–1, Ryan McAnespie 0–1, Jack McCarron 0–1	Stadium: Croke Park; Referee: Sean Hurson (Tyrone)

=== Kerry ===
22 April 2023 Munster semi-final	Kerry	0–25 – 0–05	Tipperary	Killarney
4:00pm		Report		Stadium: Fitzgerald Stadium; Attendance: 6,939; Referee: Conor Lane (Cork)

7 May 2023 Munster final	Kerry	5–14 – 0–15	Clare	Limerick
		Report		Stadium: Gaelic Grounds; Attendance: 12,499; Referee: Jerome Henry (Mayo)

20 May 2023 All-Ireland group stage	Kerry	0–17 – 1–19	Mayo	Killarney
15:00 IST (UTC+1)	David Clifford 0–8 (0–3f), Seán O'Shea 0–3 (0–2f, 0–1 '45), Paul Geaney 0–3, Tom O'Sullivan 0–2, Dara Moynihan 0–1	Report	Ryan O'Donoghue 0–5 (0–2f), Aidan O'Shea 0–3 (0–2f, 0–1m), James Carr 0–3, Eoghan McLaughlin 1–0, Matthew Ruane 0–2, Pádraig O'Hora 0–1, Donnacha McHugh 0–1, Jason Doherty 0–1, Jack Carney 0–1, Jordan Flynn 0–1, Paddy Durcan 0–1	Stadium: Fitzgerald Stadium; Attendance: 23,128; Referee: Sean Hurson

3 June 2023 All-Ireland group stage	Cork	0–15 – 1–14	Kerry	Cork
15:00 IST (UTC+1)	Brian Hurley 0–6 (0–5f, 0–1m), Seán Powter 0–2, Steven Sherlock 0–2, Eoghan McSweeney 0–2, Brian O'Driscoll 0–1, Killian O'Hanlon 0–1, Chris Óg Jones 0–1	Report	David Clifford 1–5 (1–0 pen, 0–1f), Seán O'Shea 0–5 (0–2f), Paudie Clifford 0–2, Tom O'Sullivan 0–1, Adrian Spillane 0–1	Stadium: Páirc Uí Chaoimh; Attendance: 14,081; Referee: David Gough

18 June 2023 All-Ireland group stage	Kerry	5–24 – 0–11	Louth	Portlaoise
14:00 IST (UTC+1)	Seán O'Shea 1–8 (0–3f, 0–1m), David Clifford 2–4 (1–0 pen, 0–1m), Paudie Clifford 1–2, Tony Brosnan 0–3 (0–1m), Diarmuid O'Connor 0–3, Mike Breen 1–0, Tom O'Sullivan 0–2, Dara Moynihan 0–2	Report	Dylan McKeown 0–2 (0–1f), Ciarán Downey 0–2, Conor Grimes 0–2, Sam Mulroy 0–1 (0–1f), Niall Sharkey 0–1, Liam Jackson 0–1, Anthony Williams 0–1, Conor Early 0–1	Stadium: Laois Hire O'Moore Park; Referee: James Molloy

1 July 2023 All-Ireland quarter-final	Kerry	2–18 – 0–12	Tyrone	Dublin
15:45 IST (UTC+1)	Seán O'Shea 1–5 (0–2f), David Clifford 0–5 (0–3f, 0–1m), Diarmuid O'Connor 1–2, Adrian Spillane 0–2, Paul Geaney 0–1, Paudie Clifford 0–1, Tom O'Sullivan 0–1, Stephen O'Brien 0–1	Report	Darren McCurry 0–4 (0–4f), Darragh Canavan 0–2, Ruairí Canavan 0–2, Cathal McShane 0–2, Michael McKernan 0–1, Mattie Donnelly 0–1	Stadium: Croke Park; Referee: Brendan Cawley

16 July 2023 All-Ireland semi-final	Kerry	1–17 – 1–15	Derry	Dublin
16:00 IST (UTC+1)	David Clifford 0–9 (4f 1m); Sean O'Shea 0–4 (1f), Gavin White 1–0, Paudie Clifford 0–1, Diarmuid O'Connor 0–1, Shane Ryan 0–1, Stephen O'Brien 0–1	Report	Shane McGuigan 0–6 (3f); Gareth McKinless 1–0, Brendan Rogers 0–2, Padraig Cassidy 0–2, Ciaran McFaul, 0–2, Padraig McGrogan 0–1, Odhran Lynch 0–1, Conor Doherty 0–1	Stadium: Croke Park; Referee: Joe McQuillan (Cavan)

== Pre-match ==
Demand for tickets for the final was high. The scramble for coaches and trains was also unmatched. Additional Iarnród Éireann services were added to accommodate people travelling to the final and other events taking place in Dublin during the weekend.

On 20 July, Meath's David Gough was named as referee for the decider, his second All-Ireland SFC final. Among the games Gough refereed earlier that year were the 2023 Ulster SFC final between Armagh and Derry and the All-Ireland SFC quarter-final between Dublin and Mayo, and he also refereed the 2019 All-Ireland Senior Football Championship final, which was contested by Dublin and Kerry too.

Immediately prior to the match, the Galway team that won the 1998 All-Ireland final was presented to the crowd. A tribute was paid by GAA fans to Sinéad O'Connor, who died four days before the match, when "Nothing Compares 2 U" was played on the big screen at Croke Park in honour of O'Connor.

== Match ==
=== Summary ===
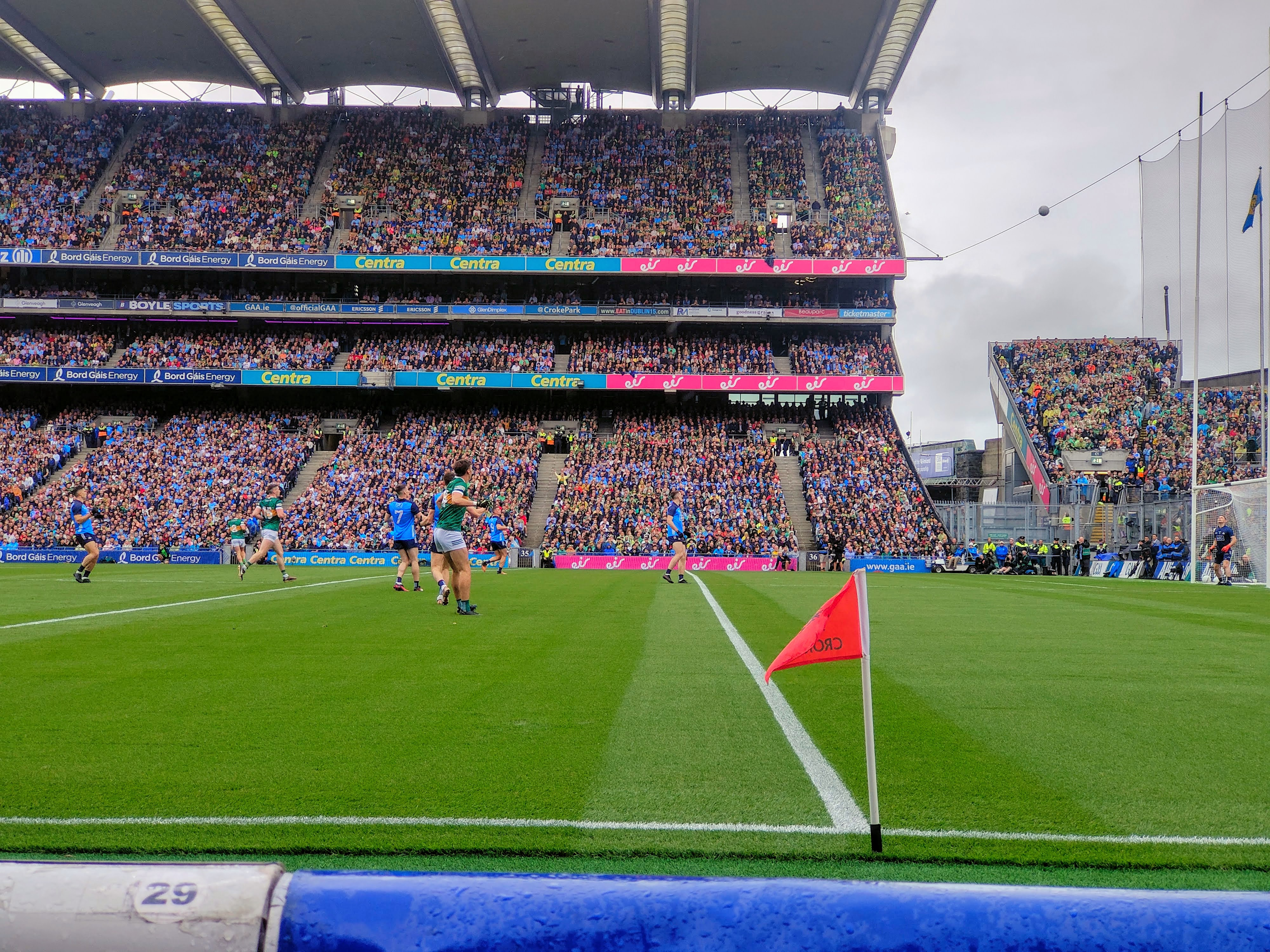
David Clifford scores a point in the first half

Prior to the game, Kerry were the slight favourites to win. David Clifford had a frustrating day, with three second half wides, ending up with two points from play. Dublin picked up three first half yellow cards for Paddy Small, Colm Basquel and Lee Gannon with a lot of hard hitting but little flowing football. Paul Mannion, marked by Jason Foley, kicked two first half points, and Brian Fenton claimed another. Stephen Cluxton landed a '45 and a free, with Cormac Costello hitting one from a free near goal. Kerry found it hard to penetrate Dublin, with Eoin Murchan following Paudie Clifford and Michael Fitzsimons keeping Clifford relatively quiet but the Kerry captain suffered from a lack of supply. A tense and cagey first half ended dramatically with a Kerry goal from Paul Geaney, set up by a magical pass by Clifford from near the corner flag at the Hill 16 end, giving the defending champions a 1-04 to 0-06 lead.

The second goal of the game had come in the 46th minute. Kerry had begun the second half with more conviction, Paudie Clifford making his presence felt, and led by three points when Small struck. Killian Spillane came on for Kerry and levelled with a fine score. However, they didn't score for the next 15 minutes by which time Dublin had regained the lead in the 67th minute and Kerry's title was on the line, until a Seán O'Shea free levelled it again in the first minute of injury time. Dublin went ahead for the final time in additional time as Mannion kicked over his fifth point. David Clifford kicked his third wide of the half four minutes later and a Mike Breen foul on Basquel was penalised by Dean Rock. They had the last say with the final two scores to seal an incredible victory for Dessie Farrell, his second as manager.

=== Details ===
RTÉ
BBC

30 July 2023
15:30 IST (UTC+1)
Final

Report

Dublin	1–15 – 1–13	Kerry
(HT: 0–6 – 1–4)
Gls: Paddy Small 1 Pts: Paul Mannion 5 (1f), Paddy Small 1, Colm Basquel 2, Stephen Cluxton 2 (1 '45', 1f), Brian Fenton 2, Brian Howard 1, Cormac Costello 1f, Dean Rock 1f		Gls: Paul Geaney 1 Pts: Seán O'Shea 5 (4fs), Paul Geaney 1, David Clifford 3 (1f), Paudie Clifford 3, Killian Spillane 1

Croke Park, Dublin
Referee: David Gough (Meath)
Attendance: 82,300
Standby: Martin McNally (Monaghan)
Linesman: James Molloy (Galway)
Sideline: Fergal Kelly (Longford)
Umpires: Dean Gough, Eugene Gough, Stephen Gough, Terry Gough (Slane)

Dublin	Kerry

GK	1	Stephen Cluxton
B	2	Eoin Murchan	(substituted off) 64'
B	3	Michael Fitzsimons
B	4	David Byrne
HB	5	James McCarthy (c)
HB	6	John Small
HB	7	Lee Gannon	(substituted off) 48'
MF	8	Brian Fenton
MF	9	Brian Howard	(substituted off) 62'
FW	10	Paddy Small	(substituted off) 68'
FW	11	Paul Mannion
FW	18	Ciaran Kilkenny
FW	13	Cormac Costello	(substituted off) 53'
FW	14	Con O'Callaghan
FW	15	Colm Basquel
Substitutes:
	16	Evan Comerford
	17	Ryan Basquel
	12	Niall Scully	(substituted on) 53'
	19	Tom Lahiff
	20	Seán MacMahon	(substituted on) 62'
	21	Jack McCaffrey	(substituted on) 48'
	22	Ross McGarry
	23	Cian Murphy	(substituted on) 64'
	24	Daire Newcombe
	25	Lorcan O'Dell
	26	Dean Rock	(substituted on) 68'
Manager:
Dessie Farrell

GK	1	Shane Ryan
B	2	Graham O'Sullivan
B	3	Jason Foley
B	4	Tom O'Sullivan
HB	5	Paul Murphy	(substituted off) 55'
HB	6	Tadhg Morley
HB	7	Gavin White
MF	8	Diarmuid O'Connor
MF	9	Jack Barry	(substituted off) 66'
FW	10	Dara Moynihan	(substituted off) 57'
FW	11	Seán O'Shea
FW	12	Stephen O'Brien	(substituted off) 57'
FW	13	Paudie Clifford
FW	14	David Clifford (c)
FW	15	Paul Geaney	(substituted off) 63'
Substitutes:
	16	Shane Murphy
	17	Adrian Spillane	(substituted on) 57'
	18	Brian Ó Beaglaoich	(substituted on) 55'
	19	Mike Breen	(substituted on) 66'
	20	Barry Dan O'Sullivan
	21	Ruairí Murphy
	22	Micheál Burns	(substituted on) 57'
	23	Killian Spillane	(substituted on) 63'
	24	Dylan Casey
	25	Donal O'Sullivan
	26	Ronan Buckley
Manager:
Jack O'Connor

Man of the Match:
Paul Mannion (Dublin)

== Post-match ==
Dublin captain James McCarthy accepted the Sam Maguire Cup from GAA president Larry McCarthy in the Hogan Stand, becoming the first Dublin captain from Ballymun Kickhams to do so. In his post-match speech, an emotional McCarthy paid tribute to manager Dessie Farrell and admitted that the team had done a lot of soul searching in the previous two years. McCarthy joined his teammates Stephen Cluxton and Michael Fitzsimons to earn nine All-Ireland SFC medals.

=== Reaction ===
Dean Rock and James McCarthy spoke to RTÉ after the match, both hinting that the final might be their last game for Dublin. Speaking to RTÉ Sport, McCarthy said: "It was a tough two years. We were disappointed with how we handled ourselves, disappointed with how we lost two semi-finals". Rock admitted he needed to weigh up his options: "That could be my last game in blue".

Paul Mannion speaking to RTÉ after the match reflected on another All-Ireland with Dublin: "It's so sweet to get it back. I knew we had another one in us".

Dublin manager Dessie Farrell paid tribute to his players after they showed "character in abundance" to fight back and beat Kerry. Speaking to RTÉ Sport, Farrell said: "I'm delighted for the players and their families, their partners, their wives. Huge commitment, huge sacrifice and they showed great character."

Kerry manager Jack O'Connor said Paddy Small's goal was a "huge turning point" in the match. Speaking to RTÉ Sport, O'Connor said: "We were well in that game and I thought at stages in the second half we were almost in control of the game."

Highlights of the final were shown on The Sunday Game programme which aired at 9:30pm that night on RTÉ2 and was presented by Jacqui Hurley.

=== Awards ===
Paul Mannion won the man of the match award which was presented by GAA president Larry McCarthy at the Dublin team's celebration banquet in Dublin. Dublin captain James McCarthy won The Sunday Game Footballer of the Year award. The Sunday Game panel also picked their 2023 Team of the Year on the Sunday night programme, with six members of the Dublin team and five members of the Kerry team included.

=== Celebrations ===
The Dublin team had a homecoming celebration the day after the final at Smithfield Square in Dublin where thousands of fans lined the streets which started at 6:30 pm, with RTÉ's Gaelic Games correspondent Marty Morrissey as MC. The Dublin team paid a visit to Temple Street Children's Hospital earlier in the day, meeting some of the young fans who were unable to make it to Croke Park. The Samuel Beckett Bridge lit up in blue to celebrate the team's achievement.

Meanwhile, hundreds of people gathered in Killarney the day after the final to welcome home the Kerry team, the runners-up.
