= 2015 All-Ireland Senior Football Championship final =

- Event: 2015 All-Ireland Senior Football Championship
Dublin	Kerry
0–12	0–9
- Date: 20 September 2015
- Venue: Croke Park, Dublin
- Man of the Match: Brian Fenton
- Referee: David Coldrick
- Weather: Heavy Rain; 14 °C (57 °F)

The 2015 All-Ireland Senior Football Championship final was a Gaelic football match played at Croke Park in Dublin on 20 September 2015 between Dublin and Kerry, the culmination of the 2015 All-Ireland Senior Football Championship. It was the 128th final of that sport's primary competition, the All-Ireland Senior Football Championship.

Leinster Champion Dublin and Munster Champion Kerry competed for the Sam Maguire Cup.

Dublin won the game on a 0–12 to 0–9 scoreline to claim their third title in five years and 25th title overall.

With over one million viewers, the match was the most-watched show on Irish television at that point in 2015. An average of 875,300 people watched the game, with a peak figure of 1.08 million as the match reached its climax.

== Paths to the final ==
Dublin opened their campaign by defeating Longford by 4–25 to 0–10 at Croke Park on 31 May. They then defeated Kildare by 5–18 to 0–14 and returned to the Leinster football final. In the Leinster final they defeated Westmeath on a 2–13 to 0–6 to claim their tenth Leinster title in 11 years. In the All-Ireland quarter final, Dublin defeated Fermanagh 2–23 to 2–15 to advance to a semi-final meeting with Mayo. The semi-final finished up in a draw, 2–12 to Dublin, 1–15 to Mayo with a replay taking place the week after. Dublin won the replay on a 3–15 to 1–14 scoreline with three goals in the final fifteen minutes after trailing by four points.

Kerry started the Munster Championship by defeating Tipperary by 2–14 to 2–8 in Semple Stadium in the semi-final on 14 June. They then went on to defeat Cork in the Munster Final, the first game ended in a draw on a 2–15 to 3–12 scoreline, with Kerry winning the replay by 1–11 to 1–6. In the All-Ireland quarter-final on 2 August, Kerry defeated Kildare by 7–16 to 0–10. In the All-Ireland Semi-final, Tyrone were defeated by 0–18 to 1–11.

== History ==
This was the 13th time Kerry and Dublin had met in an All-Ireland football final and the first since 2011, when Stephen Cluxton converted a late free-kick to win it for Dublin. Kerry had won eight of the previous meetings, and Dublin had won four.

Kerry entered the game as the most successful Gaelic football team in the history of the competition, having previously won 37 and taken part in 57 All Ireland Football finals since the competition's inception in 1887. Dublin were the second most successful team, having won 24 and taken part in 37 finals prior to this match.

The first senior final meeting between Dublin and Kerry was in 1892. Dublin defeated Kerry in the 1923 final but would not do so again until the 1976 final. The 1970s was a particularly important time in the history of the rivalry between the sides due to the regularity with which the teams encountered one another.

== Build-up ==
=== Tickets and match odds ===
Demand for tickets for the final was extremely high. There was no general sale, with all tickets being distributed via the county boards and clubs. A pair of tickets for the match was sold on eBay for €2,020. The GAA warned that the holders of any tickets that becomes known to them as having been bought on the black market could be denied entry to the match.

Dublin were priced at odds of 10/11 to win the match, with Kerry at 6/5 and the draw at 15/2 at Paddy Power bookmakers.

=== Minor final ===
Kerry played Tipperary in the All-Ireland Minor Football Championship final which took place before the senior final. Kerry won the game on a 4–14 to 0–6 scoreline to retain the title.

=== Jubilee team ===
The Cork All-Ireland-winning team of 1990, who won the title following a 0–11 to 0–9 defeat of Meath, were the jubilee team that were presented to the crowd before the final.

=== Team selection ===
Dublin's Cian O'Sullivan was a doubt for Dublin after picking up a hamstring injury in the dying seconds of the semi-final replay victory over Mayo. Jim Gavin named an unchanged team for the final on 18 September with Cian O’Sullivan having recovered from his injury.

Jack McCaffrey would later reveal that he had contracted food poisoning "in around the Thursday" before the game, which left him unable to complete it. "I couldn't keep any food or water down so I got a drip to stay hydrated. But that was actually great at the time because it completely distracted from the build-up to a final ... all you were worried about is, 'Am I going to be okay?' You're no thinking about the occasion itself. And then thankfully I pulled through and performed okay for the 50 minutes that I lasted".

The Kerry team was named on 17 September, with three changes made by manager Eamonn Fitzmaurice. Captain Kieran Donaghy, Marc ó Sé and Paul Murphy were not named in the starting fifteen, with the latter two recovering from recent injuries. Paul Geaney, Aidan O'Mahony and Fionn Fitzgerald came into the team. The omission of Marc Ó Sé meant Kerry started (and, in the end, completed) an All-Ireland final without a member of the Ó Sé family for the first time in 43 years, since the 1972 All-Ireland final.

=== Officials ===
On 8 September, David Coldrick of Meath was named as the referee for the final. It was his third time to referee an All-Ireland senior final, having previously officiated over the 2007 decider between Cork and Kerry and the 2010 final between Cork and Down.

== Match ==
=== Summary ===
After fifteen seconds of the game, Dublin's Brian Fenton got the opening point of the game, playing into the canal end of the stadium. Dean Rock missed a goal scoring chance after four minutes when his low shot after a pass from Denis Bastick was saved by Brendan Kealy. After eight minutes the score was two points each with James O'Donoghue getting Kerry's opening score. O'Donoghue got his second after seventeen minutes to put Kerry one point ahead. Steven Cluxton scored from a free after twenty one minutes to put Dublin one point ahead on 0–4 to 0–3 scoreline. Paul Geaney made the score 0–4 to 0–4 five minutes later before Bernard Brogan again put Dublin back in front with a point a minute later. Jack McCaffrey, Paddy Andrews and Philly McMahon get three more point for Dublin to put them into a four-point lead at half time on 0–8 to 0–4 scoreline.

Darran O'Sullivan replaced Stephen O'Brien for Kerry at half-time, with Kevin McManaman replacing Dean Rock for Dublin. Jonathan Lyne and Darran O'Sullivan get the opening points of the second half to make the score 0–8 to 0–6 after thirty nine minutes. Bernard Brogan scored from a free after forty one minutes for Dublin's first score of the second half with Paul Flynn getting his first point seven minutes later. James O'Donoghue got his third point of the game to make the score 0–10 to 0–8 after fifty minutes. After sixty minutes Kerry's Aidan O’Mahony took down McManaman and he received a black card. Paul Flynn got his second point with eight minutes to go to put Dublin into a three-point lead. Alan Brogan who had come on as a substitute got Dublin's final score of the game with three minutes remaining to put them four in front. Bryan Sheehan scored from a free in injury time for the final score of the game, the final score 0–12 to Dublin 0–9 to Kerry.

=== Details ===
20 September 2015
15:30 IST

Dublin	0–12 – 0–09	Kerry
Paul Flynn 0–2; Bernard Brogan 0–2 (0–1f); Dean Rock 0–2 (0–2f); Paddy Andrews 0–1; Alan Brogan 0–1; Brian Fenton 0–1; Jack McCaffrey 0–1; Philly McMahon 0–1; Stephen Cluxton 0–1 (0–1f)	Report	James O'Donoghue 0–3; Paul Geaney 0–2; Darran O'Sullivan 0–2; Jonathan Lyne; Bryan Sheehan 0–1 (0–1f)

Croke Park, Dublin
Attendance: 82,300
Referee: David Coldrick

Dublin	Kerry

GK	1	Stephen Cluxton (c)
CB	2	Jonny Cooper		(substituted off) 49'
FB	3	Rory O'Carroll	(yellow card) 70+1'
CB	4	Philly McMahon
WB	5	James McCarthy
HB	6	Cian O'Sullivan		(substituted off) 61'
WB	7	Jack McCaffrey		(substituted off) 53'
MF	8	Brian Fenton		(substituted off) 67'
MF	9	Denis Bastick		(substituted off) 40'
WF	10	Paul Flynn
HF	11	Diarmuid Connolly	(yellow card) 25'
WF	12	Ciarán Kilkenny
CF	13	Paddy Andrews	(yellow card) 63'
FF	14	Dean Rock		(substituted off) 35'
CF	15	Bernard Brogan
Substitutes:
GK	16	Michael Savage
MF	17	Tomás Brady
FW	18	Alan Brogan		(substituted on) 67'
DF	19	David Byrne
FW	20	Cormac Costello
DF	21	Darren Daly		(substituted on) 61'
DF	22	Michael Fitzsimons		(substituted on) 49'
DF	23	Eric Lowndes
MF	24	Michael Darragh MacAuley		(substituted on) 40'
FW	25	Kevin McManamon		(substituted on) 35'
DF	26	John Small		(substituted on) 53'
Manager:
Jim Gavin

GK	1	Brendan Kealy
CB	2	Fionn Fitzgerald
FB	3	Aidan O'Mahony		59'
CB	4	Shane Enright
WB	5	Jonathan Lyne
HB	6	Peter Crowley
WB	7	Killian Young		(substituted off) 60'
MF	8	Anthony Maher
MF	9	David Moran (c)		(substituted off) 57'
WF	10	Stephen O'Brien		(substituted off) 35'
HF	11	Johnny Buckley		(substituted off) 44'
WF	12	Donnchadh Walsh
CF	13	Colm Cooper
FF	14	Paul Geaney		(substituted off) 50'
CF	15	James O'Donoghue		(substituted off) 61'
Substitutes:
GK	16	Brian Kelly
FW	17	Kieran Donaghy	(yellow card) 70+1'	(substituted on) 50'
DF	18	Marc Ó Sé
DF	19	Paul Murphy		(substituted on) 59'
MF	20	Bryan Sheehan	(yellow card) 70+3'	(substituted on) 44'
FW	21	Barry John Keane		(substituted on) 61'
FW	22	Darran O'Sullivan		(substituted on) 35'
FW	23	Paul Galvin		(substituted on) 57'
FW	24	Tommy Walsh
DF	25	Pa Kilkenny
FW	26	Alan Fitzgerald
Manager:
Éamonn Fitzmaurice

Man of the Match:
Brian Fenton (Dublin)

=== Reaction ===
Highlights of the final were shown on The Sunday Game programme which aired at 9:30 pm that night on RTÉ2 and was presented by Des Cahill, with analysis from Kevin McStay, Tomás Ó Sé and Ciarán Whelan. On the man of the match award shortlist were Brian Fenton, Rory O'Carroll and Philly McMahon, with Fenton winning the award which was presented by GAA president Aogán Ó Fearghail at the Gibson hotel in Dublin.

Dublin manager Jim Gavin speaking after the match was happy with the overall performance of the team saying "It was our structure in our defence that won it for us in the end. We were very compact and very composed on the ball against massive threats all around, they came close to poaching one or two goals towards the end. We knew we had to maintain our structure throughout the game and I felt we did that and that’s why we got over the line. I'd say our shot-to-score ratio might have been a little bit ahead of theirs and opportunities that came our way we seemed to take. We created a few chances that we didn’t take but we’d always encourage our boys to go for it and great to see the likes of Brian Fenton back himself deep in the second half. He was very unlucky (with an effort that struck the post) but that’s what we’d always encourage.”

Kerry manager Eamonn Fitzmaurice speaking to RTÉ Sport after the match said that he was disappointed with the below-par performance of his team saying "We didn’t perform, we didn’t play as well as we can play, I think you have to give a lot of credit to Dublin as well. They played very well, they outworked us, they played the game at their terms. They managed to really tackle us high up the pitch, really slow us down and at the same time get bodies back. So as I said, you have to give them credit but under performed as well."

Former Dublin footballer Ciarán Whelan, writing in the Herald, felt the 2015 Dublin team was probably the best to pull on the jersey saying: "I think it is fair to day at this point that this team is probably the greatest team ever to put on the Dublin jersey and the sacrifices that they have made is finally being rewarded on the top stage. It is a truly remarkable achievement to win so many Leinster, All-Ireland and National league wins and we should savour every moment as these periods of success have been few and far between over the past thirty years."

Jim McGuinness, writing in the Irish Times, felt that the weather completely dominated the game and that Alan Brogan's introduction was critical saying "There were 29 turnovers in the first half alone and they were caused by the rain as much as by player error. What he (Alan Brogan) did for his point is well worth any young player studying. If you watch it back, he was making decisions during that entire run up the pitch as he carried the ball. Even though the ball never left his hands it is clear he is thinking: will I give it here or not? Give it now or not? He kept taking the right option the whole way up the pitch – in a crunch moment of the All-Ireland final when Dublin had what was still a precarious lead on a day of treacherous weather. And eventually, he took the perfect decision in kicking the ball over the bar. He also won a break down at the far end when Rory O’Carroll broke a ball away from Kieran Donaghy. So he was involved in a couple of big moments. He showed great patience all season in terms of using whatever game time he was given and it was a classy performance here."

=== Trophy presentation ===
Dublin captain Stephen Cluxton accepted the Sam Maguire Cup from GAA president Aogán Ó Fearghail in the Hogan Stand.

=== Celebrations ===
The Dublin team had a homecoming celebration on 21 September on O'Connell Street. The event began at 7.15 pm with a stage erected to the south of the Spire. The team arrived on an open-top bus for the celebrations before heading out to the Parnells GAA club, the club of captain Stephen Cluxton.

=== Broadcasting ===
The match shown live on television in Ireland on The Sunday Game from 2.15 pm on RTÉ2. RTÉ television coverage was presented by Michael Lyster from Croke Park, with studio analysis from Joe Brolly, Pat Spillane, and Colm O'Rourke. Match commentary was by Ger Canning with comments by Martin Carney. Sky Sports also showed the match live with Rachel Wyse and Brian Carney presenting and Peter Canavan, Jim McGuinness and Senan Connell providing in-studio analysis.

=== Related events ===
Elsewhere in the world, soldiers paused to watch the game. A banner welcoming refugees was also displayed during the game.

== See also ==
- All Ireland Day, a documentary
