= 2019 All-Ireland Senior Football Championship final =

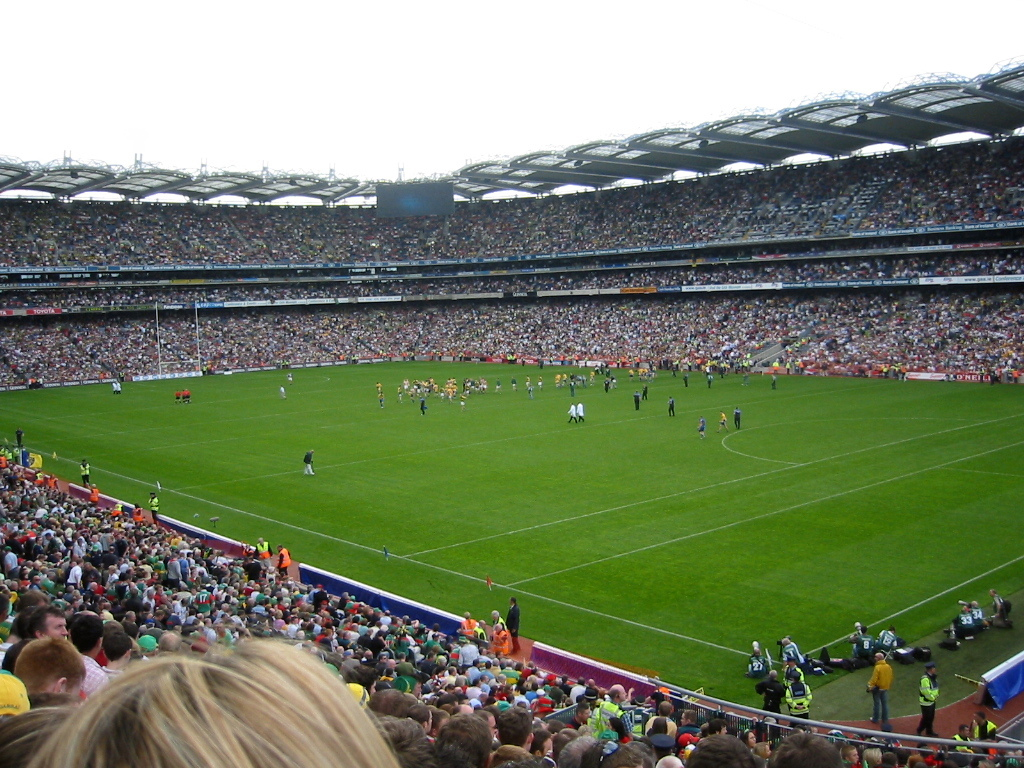
- To the left is the goal into which Eoin Murchan scored his goal in the replay.
- Event: 2019 All-Ireland Senior Football Championship
| Dublin | Kerry |
| 1–16 (19) | 1–16 (19) |
- Date: 1 September 2019
- Venue: Croke Park, Dublin
- Man of the Match: Jack McCaffrey
- Referee: David Gough (Meath)
- Weather: Dry

2019 All-Ireland Senior Football Championship final replay
- Event: 2019 All-Ireland Senior Football Championship
| Dublin | Kerry |
| 1–18 (21) | 0–15 (15) |
- Date: 14 September 2019
- Venue: Croke Park, Dublin
- Man of the Match: Ciarán Kilkenny
- Referee: Conor Lane (Cork)
- Attendance: 82,300
- Weather: Fine

The 2019 All-Ireland Senior Football Championship final was the 132nd final of Gaelic football's primary competition, the All-Ireland Senior Football Championship, and the culmination of the 2019 tournament. Reigning title holder Dublin took on Munster champion Kerry, with Dublin bidding to become the first Gaelic Athletic Association (GAA) male (Note: The Women's All-Ireland Senior Football title was won by Kerry nine consecutive times between 1982 and 1990. However, many sources do not treat this as a GAA record as the women's game is run by the Ladies' Gaelic Football Association, which is independent of the GAA (although there is much overlap — for instance, the aforementioned Kerry women's team is run by the same body that runs the Kerry men's team).) team to win five consecutive editions of the competition. The last time a football team had this chance was in 1982; however, Kerry failed, their own winning streak being brought to an end by a last-minute goal.

The first game was played at Croke Park in Dublin on 1 September 2019, featuring goals by Jack McCaffrey (top scorer from open play with 1–3) and Killian Spillane and a red card for Jonny Cooper. It finished in a draw, so a replay was held on 14 September. Dublin replaced M. D. MacAuley with Eoin Murchan for the replay, while RTÉ replaced Joe Brolly with Stephen Rochford. Murchan scored a goal straight from the second half throw-in as Dublin defeated Kerry by a scoreline of 1–18 to 0–15 in the replay to become the first male team to win five consecutive GAA All-Ireland titles.

The game was televised nationally by RTÉ2 as part of The Sunday Game live programme, presented by Joanne Cantwell (for the first time) from Croke Park, with studio analysis from Joe Brolly, Pat Spillane, and Ciarán Whelan. The play-by-play announcer was Ger Canning, assisted by colour commentator Kevin McStay. The game was also televised internationally by Sky Sports, presented by Rachel Wyse and Brian Carney.

On television, the drawn game received a 76.5% audience share. The replay received a 72.3% audience share.

== Background ==
Dublin went into the final aiming for an unprecedented five-in-a-row of All-Ireland titles. Kerry twice came close to a five-in-a-row, winning the All-Ireland in 1929–32 and losing the 1933 semi-final; and winning the All-Ireland in 1978–81 and losing the 1982 final.

Kerry and Dublin had met in 13 previous All-Ireland finals, with Kerry winning eight of these and Dublin five.

Between them, the two counties had won half of the All-Ireland championships played once the 2019 final was completed: Kerry having 37 wins (the last in 2014) and Dublin having 28 ahead of the 2019 final. Adding in 2019, this gave a total of 66, out of 132 years in which the All-Ireland Senior Football Championship has been completed.

Dublin were 1/5 in the betting odds going into the first game, unprecedented odds against Kerry in an All-Ireland final. Pundits from outside the counties involved, such as Martin McHugh, tipped Dublin to win.

This was also only the third championship replay between the teams since their rivalry began in 1892. Yet the other two were not All-Ireland finals, nor were they played at Croke Park, making 2019 the first such replay.

== Paths to the final ==
=== Dublin ===
==== Leinster Championship ====
| 25 May 2019 Quarter-final | Dublin | 5–21 (36) – (10) 0–10 | Louth | Portlaoise |
| 19:00 IST (UTC+1) | | (HT: 1–12 – 0–04) | | Venue: O'Moore Park |
| | | Report | | Referee: Jerome Henry (Mayo); Attendance: 14,380 |

| 9 June 2019 Semi-final | Dublin | 0–26 (26) – (11) 0–11 | Kildare | Dublin |
| 16:00 IST (UTC+1) | | (HT: 0–11 – 0–07) | | Venue: Croke Park |
| | | Report | | Referee: Conor Lane (Cork) |

| 23 June 2019 Final | Dublin | 1–17 (20) – (4) 0–04 | Meath | Dublin |
| 16:00 IST (UTC+1) | | (HT: 0–05 – 0–01) | | Venue: Croke Park |
| | | Report | | Referee: Sean Hurson (Tyrone); Attendance: 47,027; TV: RTÉ |

Dublin won the Leinster Championship and so advanced directly to the quarter-final group stage.

==== All-Ireland Quarter-Final Group Stage (Super 8) ====
| 13 July 2019 Phase 1 | Dublin | 5–18 (33) – (20) 1–17 | Cork | Dublin |
| 19:00 IST (UTC+1) | | (HT: 2–9 – 0–9) | | Venue: Croke Park |
| | Gls: Jack McCaffrey 1, Michael Darragh MacAuley 1, Niall Scully 1, Ciarán Kilkenny 1, Brian Fenton 1 Pts: Dean Rock 5 (3f, 1 '45'), Con O'Callaghan 4, Ciarán Kilkenny 2, Philly McMahon 2, Paul Mannion 2, Brian Fenton 1, John Small 1, Cormac Costello 1 (1f) | Report | Gls: Luke Connolly 1 (1p); Pts: Luke Connolly 3 (1 '45'), Paul Kerrigan 3, Brian Hurley 3 (1f), Michael Hurley 2, Mark Collins 1 (1f), Sean White 1, Ruairi Deane 1, Kevin O'Driscoll 1, Mattie Taylor 1, Liam O'Donovan 1 | Referee: David Gough (Meath); Attendance: 30,214; TV: RTÉ |

| 20 July 2019 Phase 2 | Dublin | 2–26 (32) – (14) 0–14 | Roscommon | Dublin |
| 19:00 IST (UTC+1) | | (HT: 1–15 – 0–7) | | Venue: Croke Park |
| | Gls: Dean Rock 1, Michael Darragh MacAuley 1 Pts: Dean Rock 11 (10f), Paul Mannion 3, Paddy Small 3, Ciarán Kilkenny 2, Brian Fenton 2, Con O'Callaghan 2, Jack McCaffrey 1, Kevin McManamon 1, Niall Scully 1 | Report | Pts: Conor Cox 7 (4f), Conor Hussey 3, Cathal Compton 1, Diarmuid Murtagh 1, Niall Daly 1, Seán Mullooly 1 | Referee: Barry Cassidy (Derry); TV: Sky Sports |

| 4 August 2019 Phase 3 | Tyrone | 0–13 (13) – (19) 1–16 | Dublin | Omagh |
| 16:00 IST (UTC+1) | | (HT: 0–5 – 0–8) | | Venue: Healy Park |
| | Pts: Connor McAliskey 5 (2f), Richard Donnelly 2, Kyle Coney 2 (2f), Conan Grugan 1, Conall McCann 1, Darren McCurry 1, Niall Sludden 1 | Report | Gls: Eoghan O'Gara 1 Pts: Cormac Costello 6 (4f), Seán Bugler 3, Kevin McManamon 2, Paddy Small 2, Paddy Andrews 1, Bernard Brogan 1, Diarmuid Connolly 1 | Referee: Joe McQuillan (Cavan); Attendance: 15,315; TV: RTÉ |

Dublin finished first in Group 2 and advanced to the All-Ireland semi-final.

==== All-Ireland Semi-Final ====
| 10 August 2019 Semi-Final | Mayo | 1–10 (13) – (23) 3–14 | Dublin | Dublin |
| 17:00 IST (UTC+1) | | | | Venue: Croke Park |
| | | | | Referee: Conor Lane (Cork); TV: RTÉ; Sky Sports |

=== Kerry ===
==== Munster Championship ====
| 1 June 2019 Semi-final | Kerry | 1–15 (18) – (12) 0–12 | Clare | Ennis |
| 19:00 IST (UTC+1) | | (HT: 1–09 – 0–03) | | Venue: Cusack Park |
| | | Report | | Referee: James Molloy (Galway) |

| 22 June 2019 Final | Kerry | 1–19 (22) – (19) 3–10 | Cork | Cork |
| 19:00 IST (UTC+1) | | (HT: 1–10 – 1–04) | | Venue: Páirc Uí Chaoimh |
| | | Report | | Referee: Anthony Nolan (Wicklow); TV: RTÉ |

Kerry won the Munster Championship and so advanced directly to the quarter-final group stage.

==== All-Ireland Quarter-Final Group Stage (Super 8) ====
| 14 July 2019 Phase 1 | Kerry | 1–22 (25) – (15) 0–15 | Mayo | Killarney |
| 16:00 IST (UTC+1) | | (HT: 0–15 – 0–6) | | Venue: Fitzgerald Stadium |
| | Gls: Paul Geaney 1 Pts: David Clifford 7 (1f), Sean O’Shea 7 (6f), Stephen O'Brien 3, Paul Geaney 2, David Moran 1, James O'Donoghue 1, Graham O’Sullivan 1, Shane Enright 1 | Report | Pts: Cillian O'Connor 6 (3f, 1p), Darren Coen 3, Andy Moran 2, Lee Keegan 1, Fionn McDonagh 1, Fergal Boland 1, Ciaran Tracey 1 | Referee: Sean Hurson (Tyrone); Attendance: 31,312; TV: RTÉ |

| 21 July 2019 Phase 2 | Kerry | 1–20 (23) – (23) 1–20 | Donegal | Dublin |
| 16:00 IST (UTC+1) | | (HT: 0–10 – 0–9) | | Venue: Croke Park |
| | Gls: Paul Geaney 1 Pts: Paul Geaney 4, Sean O'Shea 4 (3f), David Clifford 3 (1f), Stephen O'Brien 3, Killian Spillane 3, Tom O'Sullivan 1, Jason Foley 1, Paul Murphy 1 | Report | Gls: Michael Murphy 1 (1p); Pts: Michael Murphy 7 (4f), Patrick McBrearty 5 (3f), Ryan McHugh 2, Oisín Gallen 2, Michael Langan 2, Jason McGee 1, Niall O’Donnell 1 | Referee: Paddy Neilan (Roscommon); TV: RTÉ |

| 3 August 2019 Phase 3 | Meath | 1–13 (16) – (24) 2–18 | Kerry | Navan |
| 18:00 IST (UTC+1) | | (HT: 1–9 – 1–10) | | Venue: Páirc Tailteann |
| | Gls: Darragh Campion 1 Pts: Shane Walsh 6 (3f), Bryan McMahon 3, Darragh Campion 1, Thomas O'Reilly 1, Ethan Devine 1, Bryan Menton 1 | Report | Gls: Sean O'Shea 1, Brian Ó Beaglaoích 1 Pts: Sean O'Shea 8 (4f, 1 ’45′), Killian Spillane 3, Paul Geaney 2, David Moran 2, Brian Ó Beaglaoích 1, Stephen O'Brien 1, Tom O'Sullivan 1 | Referee: Fergal Kelly (Longford); TV: Sky Sports |

Kerry finished first in Group 1 and advanced to the All-Ireland semi-final.

==== All-Ireland Semi-Final ====
| 11 August 2019 Semi-Final | Tyrone | 0–18 (18) – (21) 1–18 | Kerry | Dublin |
| 15:30 IST (UTC+1) | | | | Venue: Croke Park |
| | | | | Referee: Maurice Deegan (Laois); Attendance: 33,848; TV: RTÉ; Sky Sports |

== Match 1 ==
=== Summary ===
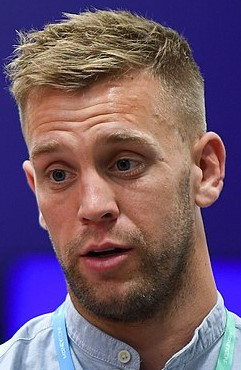
Jonny Cooper was sent off towards the end of the first half

Cork played Galway in the All-Ireland Minor Football Championship final which took place before the senior final. Cork won the game on a 3–20 to 3–14 scoreline after extra-time.

The Down team that won the 1994 All-Ireland Final were presented to the crowd before the senior match to mark the 25th anniversary of their win.

Peter Keane's decision to bring in Jack Barry instead of Killian Spillane limited the effectiveness of Dublin's Brian Fenton. Dublin played facing the Railway End in the first half. Nevertheless, Paul Mannion had pointed to put Dublin into the lead within 17 seconds. A David Clifford miss for Kerry was followed by Seán O'Shea equalising for the Kingdom. By the fifth minute Dublin were in the lead by 0–3 to 0–1, Dean Rock having scored one from play and one free. Paul Geaney had a goal chance for Kerry in the seventh minute, beating Stephen Cluxton in the Dublin goal only for James McCarthy to clear the ball off the line. Clifford missed again. Then he scored a point. Jonny Cooper conceded a penalty to Kerry while holding onto Clifford. Having stepped off his line in advance of Geaney striking the ball, Cluxton saved; and Sean O'Shea levelled the game from the resulting '45. Stephen O'Brien and Mannion exchanged scores before referee David Gough showed Cooper the yellow card for persistent fouling, after another tangle with Clifford. Sean O'Shea put Kerry ahead with the free. Then Jack McCaffrey scored his fourth championship goal to give Dublin a 1–4 to 0–5 lead. Dublin's Rock and Kerry's O'Shea continued to exchange points until the end of the half (Con O'Callaghan's score being the only exception). Then, with the break approaching, Cooper fouled Clifford once more and received a second yellow card and then a red, reducing Dublin to 14 players. Sean O'Shea sent the resulting free between the posts to leave the half-time score at Dublin 1–9 Kerry 0–8.

Kerry's Seán O'Shea scored the opening point of the second half from a '45. Cluxton then tipped a Paul Murphy strike on goal against the Dublin crossbar. O'Shea scored another point for Kerry, swiftly followed by McCaffrey fisting the ball over the bar for Dublin. Kerry's Gavin Crowley then scored his first championship point. A score from another Rock free was followed by another McCaffrey point. With the score at Dublin 1–12 Kerry 0–12, Dublin's Paul Mannion kicked the ball wide in the fiftieth minute. Rock scored another free and McCaffrey scored another point. Killian Spillane then netted a goal for Kerry to reduce Dublin's lead to two points. Kerry substitute Tommy Walsh reduced the deficit to one point. Sean O'Shea brought the sides level with his ninth point of the game (second from play) with eight minutes of regulation time remaining. Clifford sent a shot straight into the arms of Cluxton. With three minutes of regulation time remaining, Kerry led thanks to a point from Killian Spillane. In the closing stages, and with Dublin behind and in danger of losing their five-in-a-row bid, Hawk-Eye ruled out what had been thought to be an equalising point from Dublin's Cormac Costello in between uncharacteristically wild and inaccurate shots from distance by both Brian Howard and Diarmuid Connolly (a substitute for Howard), before Rock brought Dublin level for the last time. The match finished level, requiring a replay.

McCaffrey finished top scorer from open play with 1–3. The three points were also a classic hat-trick, sent over with fist and both feet. Defensively, he forced eight turnovers of possession. McCaffrey won the man of the match award, his second consecutive award after the one from the 2018 final; "RTÉ veterans" were reported to be finding it difficult to recall such an occurrence over previous finals.

=== Details ===
RTÉ
Sky Sports

1 September 2019
15:30 IST (UTC+1)
Final

Report

| Dublin | 1–16 (19) – (19) 1–16 | Kerry |
|---|---|---|
(HT: 1–9 – 0–8)
| Gls: Jack McCaffrey 1 Pts: Dean Rock 10 (6f, 1 '45), Jack McCaffrey 3, Paul Mannion 2, Con O'Callaghan 1 | | Gls: Killian Spillane 1 Pts: Seán O'Shea 10 (4f, 3 '45), David Clifford 2, Gavin Crowley 1, Killian Spillane 1, Stephen O'Brien 1, Tommy Walsh 1 |

Croke Park, Dublin
Referee: David Gough (Meath)
Standby: Conor Lane (Cork)
Linesman: Barry Cassidy (Derry)
Sideline: Sean Hurson (Tyrone)
Umpires: Eugene Gough, Terry Gough, Stephen Gough, Dean Gough (all Slane GFC, Meath)

== Match 2 ==
=== Summary ===
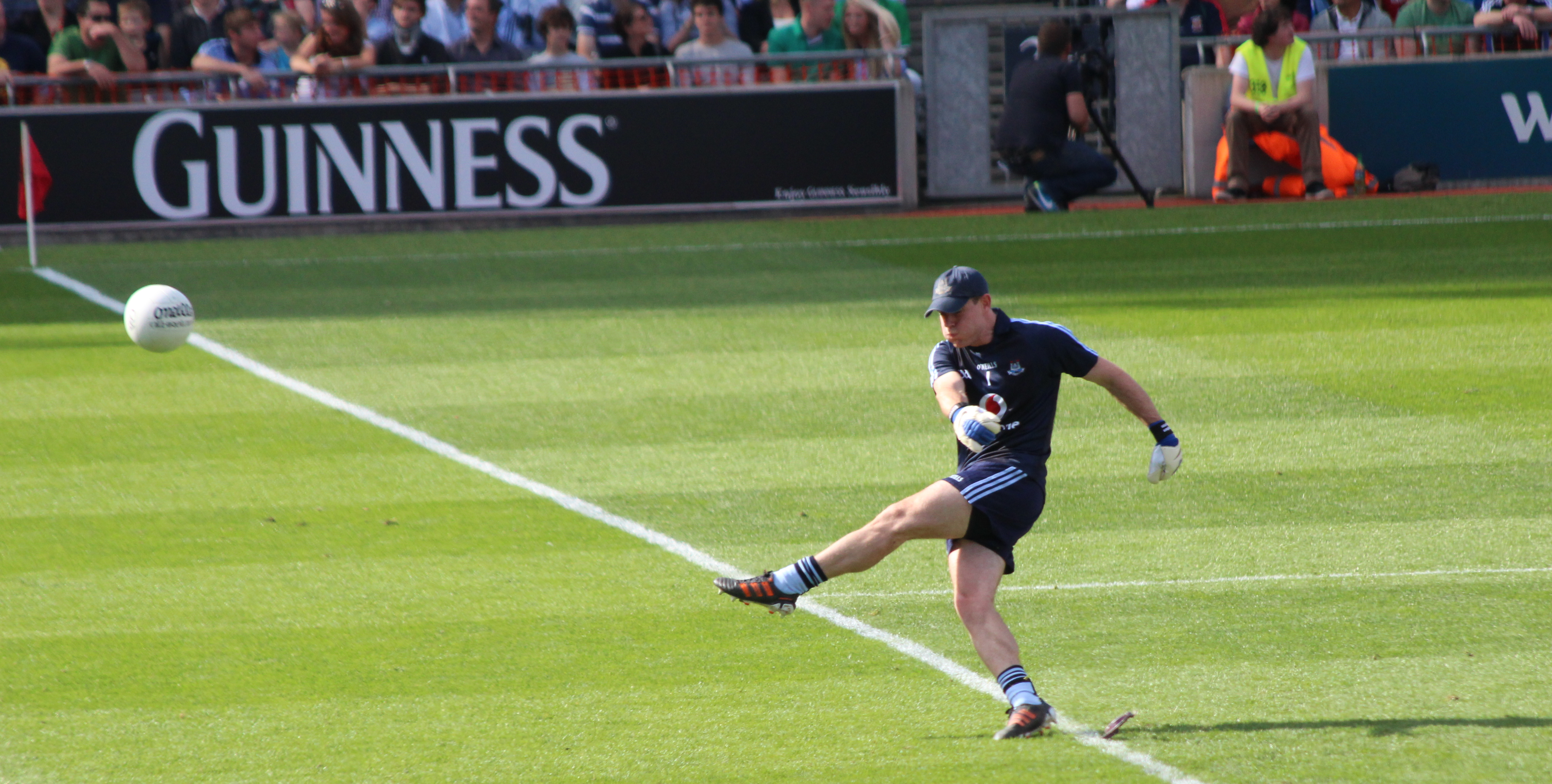
Dublin goalkeeper Stephen Cluxton made critical saves in both games and collected his seventh All-Ireland medal (his sixth as captain)

The replay took place at Croke Park on 14 September. Dublin replaced M. D. MacAuley with Eoin Murchan; Kerry brought in Diarmuid O'Connor in place of team captain Gavin White. Paul Murphy took on the captain's role. The coin toss was won by Dublin; they opted to play facing the Railway End in the first half. Con O'Callaghan opened the scoring for Dublin within seconds of the throw-in. Eoin Murchan then handpassed to Ciarán Kilkenny, who sent Dublin into a two-point lead. A Seán O'Shea free gave Kerry their opening point. Paul Mannion then restored Dublin's two-point lead, with Kilkenny then increasing the lead to three and Mannion (again) to four. Paul Geaney scored Kerry's second point of the game. A third Kerry point followed from David Clifford, before O'Callaghan scored another for Dublin. Then Dublin's David Byrne scored the second championship point of his career. Adrian Spillane scored for Kerry, Clifford following suit with two points in quick succession. Then Kilkenny and Geaney traded scores. Then O'Callaghan scored for Dublin. Then Dublin's Jack McCaffrey lost the ball and Kerry's Clifford, Brian Ó Beaglaoich and Tadhg Morley raced through on goal, only for O'Callaghan to haul the Kerryman down and O'Shea to hit the resulting free over the bar. Michael Fitzsimons was wrongly adjudged to have committed the foul by the referee. Dublin then scored a point of their own before O'Shea sent another free over for Kerry. Geaney brought the teams level with a point for Kerry as half-time approached. McCaffrey, meanwhile, fell, apparently struggling with injury. The half-time score was level with ten points apiece: Dublin 0–10 Kerry 0–10.

McCaffrey did not take to the field for the second half. Diarmuid Connolly came on in his place. Dublin's Eoin Murchan reacted to the throw-in by racing straight for the Kerry goal, hitting the ball into the right corner of the net. Joe Brolly later described Murchan's goal as "arguably the most important moment in the history of Dublin football". O'Callaghan then pointed for Dublin. Clifford and Geaney each scored a point for Kerry. Paul Mannion sent the ball wide in the 43rd minute - this was Dublin's first wide of the game. Then Seán O'Shea scored for Kerry. Then Connolly struck the ball directly at Kilkenny from distance; Kilkenny simply gathered the ball and converted it into another point for Dublin. Mannion sent Dublin into a three-point lead in the 51st minute, a minute before Connolly sent the ball wide. Dublin goalkeeper Stephen Cluxton then saved a Stephen O'Brien shot. Mannion scored again for Dublin. Clifford reduced Dublin's lead to three points. Then a Connolly pass found Niall Scully, who sent the ball over the bar instead of at the goal; it proved to be Scully's last involvement as he was then replaced by Cormac Costello. Geaney missed. Killian Spillane came on for Paul Murphy. Jack Barry added to Kerry's wide tally before being replaced by James O'Donoghue. Dean Rock sent Dublin into a five-point lead with two minutes of regulation time remaining. Connolly had a shot on goal saved; O'Callaghan gathered the rebound but his effort was also saved. Rock sent the resulting '45 between the posts to give Dublin a six-point lead. As the seconds ticked away, Kerry resorted to Hail Mary passes, with Stephen O'Brien sending the ball wide. Dublin defeated Kerry on a scoreline of 1–18 to 0–15. They became the first male team in GAA history to win five consecutive All-Ireland titles at this level.

Ciarán Kilkenny was named as man of the match in the replay, becoming the first forward since 2013's Bernard Brogan the Second to win the award.

=== Details ===
RTÉ
Sky Sports

14 September 2019
18:00 IST (UTC+1)
Final Replay

Report

| Dublin | 1–18 (21) – (15) 0–15 | Kerry |
|---|---|---|
(HT: 0–10 – 0–10)
| Gls: Eoin Murchan 1 Pts: Ciaran Kilkenny 4, Con O'Callaghan 4, Paul Mannion 4, Dean Rock 3 (1 '45), David Byrne 1, James McCarthy 1, Niall Scully 1 | | Pts: Seán O'Shea 5 (3f), David Clifford 5 (1f), Paul Geaney 4, Adrian Spillane 1 |

Croke Park, Dublin
Referee: Conor Lane (Cork)
Attendance: 82,300
Standby: Maurice Deegan (Laois)
Linesman: David Coldrick (Meath)
Sideline: Niall Cullen (Fermanagh)
Umpires: Kevin Roache, DJ O'Sullivan (both Banteer/Lyre), Ray Hegarty (Bride Rovers), Pat Kelly (Kilshannig)

Dublin
Kerry

== Post-match ==
Dublin goalkeeper Stephen Cluxton celebrated — by taking out a broom and sweeping the changing room floor. Stewards later witnessed him mopping the floor too, when all the other players had left. Cluxton was later named All Stars Footballer of the Year.

Lord Mayor of Dublin Paul McAuliffe proposed Dublin manager Jim Gavin for the Freedom of the City of Dublin; all members of Dublin City Council "warmly welcomed" McAuliffe's proposal and the motion was passed in a vote taken on the evening of 23 September 2019. The last time the award was given was in 2016. The last GAA figure to receive the award was Kevin Heffernan in 2004.

Dean Rock, Ciarán Kilkenny and Paddy Andrews spent a week in New York. Brian Fenton went on holiday to Marbella with his girlfriend for a few days.

== See also ==
- 2019 All-Ireland Senior Ladies' Football Championship
