= Stephen Coen =

Mayo Gaelic footballer

Personal information
- Native name: Stiofán Ó Cadhain (Irish)
- Born: 11 December 1995 (age 30) Castlebar, County Mayo, Ireland
- Occupation: Student

Sport
- Sport: Gaelic football (Peil Ghaelach)
- Position: Centre Back
Club
- Years: Club
- Hollymount-Carramore GAA
College
- Years: College
- UCD
College titles
- Sigerson titles: 2
Inter-county
- Years: County
- 2015–: Mayo
Inter-county titles
- Connacht titles: 4

Stephen Coen is a Gaelic footballer who plays for Hollymount-Carramore and the Mayo county team.

Coen attended St Colman's College, Claremorris.

== Playing career ==
Coen led both Mayo minor team and Mayo under-21 team to All-Ireland titles as captain in 2013 and 2016, respectively. Coen also captained the UCD freshers team to All-Ireland success in 2015 and the senior team to win the 2017/18 Sigerson Cup. Coen won a Sigerson cup previosuly in 2016 too. Coen also played with his club Hollymount-Carramore in the 2015/16 All-Ireland Intermediate Club Football Championship final, which they lost.

Coen replaced Lee Keegan as a substitute in the 2016 All-Ireland Senior Football Championship Final, and was also used as a substitute for Colm Boyle in the 2017 All-Ireland Senior Football Championship Final.

He advanced to starting positions in the teams that lost the 2020 and 2021 All-Ireland Senior Football Championship Finals, each by five points.

He was appointed captain of the Mayo senior team ahead of the 2022 season..

Coen won 2 National Football league titles (Division 1)in 2019 and 2023, and a Division 2 title in 2021.

In 2026 he won the All Ireland Senior Football championship with Mayo.

Sporting positions
Preceded by Aidan O'Shea	Mayo Senior Football Captain; 2022	Succeeded by Paddy Durcan
Achievements
Preceded by David Byrne (Dublin)	All-Ireland Minor Football Final winning captain 2013	Succeeded by Liam Kearney (Kerry)
Preceded by Kieran McGeary (Tyrone)	All-Ireland Under-21 Football Final winning captain 2016	Succeeded by Cillian O'Shea & Con O'Callaghan (Dublin)
