= Donal Vaughan =

Irish Gaelic footballer

Personal information
- Native name: Dómhnall Mac Úachán (Irish)
- Nickname: Shoes
- Born: 1988 or 1989 (age 37–38)) Cork, Ireland
- Occupation: Shoe seller
- Height: 1.88 m (6 ft 2 in)

Sport
- Sport: Gaelic football
- Position: Centre Back
Clubs
- Years: Club
- 2006–2017; 2017–: Ballinrobe; Castlebar Mitchels
Inter-county
- Years: County
- 2009–2021: Mayo
Inter-county titles
- Connacht titles: 5
- All-Irelands: 0
- NFL: 1
- All Stars: 0

Donal Vaughan (born 1988 or 1989) is a Gaelic footballer who played inter county football with Mayo. He plays club football for Castlebar Mitchels since 2017 after leaving Ballinrobe.

== Playing career ==
Vaughan started at centre back in two All-Ireland SFC finals: the 2012 decider, which Mayo lost by 0–13 to 2–11 against Donegal and the 2013 final, which Mayo lost by 1–14 to 2–12 against Dublin.

Vaughan was sent off in the 2017 All-Ireland Senior Football Championship Final after a reckless charge at John Small of Dublin after a free was awarded and Small was shown his second yellow of the match. Dublin would go on to win afterwards. Some Mayo fans blamed Vaughan's sending off as the main reason why Mayo lost the final.

In December 2017, he moved from his home club Ballinrobe to rivals Castlebar Mitchels, a town where he lived and worked, following Ballinrobe's relegation to the Intermediate ranks.

Vaughan announced his retirement from the inter-county game in January 2021.

== Personal life ==
Vaughan owns his own shoe shop chain in his home county, which is named Vaughan Shoes.
