= 1982 All-Ireland Senior Ladies' Football Championship final =

1982 All-Ireland Senior Ladies' Football Final
- Event: 1982 All-Ireland Senior Ladies' Football Championship
Kerry	Offaly
1–8	1–2
- Date: 3 October 1982
- Venue: McDonagh Park, Nenagh
- Weather: Wet and windy

The 1982 All-Ireland Senior Ladies' Football Championship final was the ninth All-Ireland Final and the deciding match of the 1982 All-Ireland Senior Ladies' Football Championship, an inter-county ladies' Gaelic football tournament for the top teams in Ireland.

Kerry won by six points in terrible weather. This was the first title of their nine-in-a-row.
