= David Gough =

Gaelic football referee (born 1983)

David Gough (/ɡɒf/ GOF; born 1983) is a Gaelic football referee from County Meath. He is a member of the Slane club. His four umpires are father Eugene, brother Stephen, uncle Terry and cousin Dean, who have assisted him with every game since he started.

As well as hoping to referee a final of the All-Ireland Senior Football Championship, Gough wants to referee the International Rules Series. He achieved the first of these goals in 2019.

== Playing career ==
Gough has played football in his county since the age of seven. He has a Hogan Cup medal with St Pat's of Navan, from 2001. He also has a county under-21 C title with his club, a Trench Cup medal and a Division 2 League title with St Patrick's College in Drumcondra.

== Refereeing career ==
Gough was introduced to refereeing by Tom Fitzpatrick, the games promotion officer at Drumcondra. After leaving college Gough began a refereeing course in Meath. He began refereeing in late 2007.

Gough and Fitzpatrick volunteer with outdoor advertising company CBS, who project images onto the big screens at Croke Park, tasked with preventing any contentious incidents being shown at the stadium. He was on hand at the 2010 Leinster Senior Football Championship Final to block RTÉ showing the scenes from that match's notorious ending.

Gough's first competitive inter-county fixture was a 2011 O'Byrne Cup match between Offaly and UCD on a wet Wednesday night in Rhode. He received a high 95 per cent from referee assessor, Joe Moynagh from Louth.

He refereed his first championship game in 2013.

Gough refereed the 2014 National Football League Division 2 final between Donegal and Monaghan, the final of the 2015 O'Byrne Cup between Dublin and Kildare, the 2016 All-Ireland Senior Football Championship semi-final between Dublin and Kerry, the 2017 All-Ireland Senior Football Championship semi-final replay between Mayo and Kerry and the 2020 All-Ireland Senior Football Championship semi-final between Mayo and Tipperary

He has now refereed all four top finals in the GAA Calendar. In chronological order these were:

- 2013 All-Ireland Under 21 Football Championship final between Galway and Cork
- 2015 All-Ireland Minor Football Championship final between Kerry and Tipperary
- 2017–18 All-Ireland Senior Club Football Championship final between Corofin (Galway) and Nemo Rangers (Cork)
- 2019 All-Ireland Senior Football Championship final (drawn game) between Dublin and Kerry
- 2023 All-Ireland Senior Football Championship final between Dublin and Kerry

At provincial level, he has officiated at the

- 2016 Munster Senior Football Championship final, between Kerry and Tipperary
- 2017 Connacht Senior Football Championship final, between Galway and Roscommon
- 2018 Ulster Senior Football Championship final, between Donegal and Fermanagh
- 2021 Ulster Senior Football Championship final, between Monaghan and Tyrone
- 2023 Ulster Senior Football Championship final, between Derry and Armagh
- 2024 Connacht Senior Football Championship final, between Galway and Mayo

At local level, Gough refereed three Meath Intermediate Football Championship finals (2010, 2013 and the replay in 2016) and the 2011 Meath Senior Football Championship final replay between Summerhill and Dunshaughlin. He was appointed to his first 2019 Meath Senior Football Championship Final proper where Ratoath GAA defeated Summerhill. He also refereed the 2011 Leinster intermediate club final and the 2012 Leinster Senior club final between Ballymun Kickhams and Portlaoise. He also presided over the 2018 Leinster Senior Club final where Mullinalaghta overcome Kilmacud Crokes.

Abroad now, and Gough has also refereed Gaelic football matches in Spain, in Qatar (Middle East Games) and in the United States (New York versus Sligo in the 2017 Connacht Senior Football Championship).

After initially opting out of refereeing during the early stages of the COVID-19 pandemic, Gough (citing the GAA's summer Cúl Camps as offering encouragement due to the lack of cases there) returned to refereeing underage games; he then offered to make himself available for a Meath Senior Football Championship fixture when a colleague became unavailable. He went on to referee the 2020 All-Ireland Senior Football Championship semi-final between Mayo and Tipperary.

Gough refereed the 2023 All-Ireland Senior Football Championship final, which was his 46th SFC game.

== Personal life ==
Gough is a teacher by profession.

He is his sport's first openly gay top-level match official. In 2015, the sport's governing body refused to allow him wear a rainbow wristband during a league match between Dublin and Tyrone at Croke Park, prompting media coverage, discussion, criticism and disappointment. Five years later, however, he and players from Mayo and Tipperary took part in the Rainbow Laces campaign during an All-Ireland SFC semi-final.

Gough plays tennis and is a member of Ashbrook tennis club in Dublin.

He has studied Latin.
