= Rob Hennelly =

Irish Gaelic footballer

Personal information
- Native name: Riobeard Ó hIonnaile (Irish)
- Born: 8 March 1990 (age 36) Castlebar, Ireland
- Occupation: Tech
- Height: 1.86 m (6 ft 1 in)

Sport
- Sport: Gaelic football
- Position: Goalkeeper
Clubs
- Years: Club
- 2007–2022 2023–: Breaffy; Raheny
College
- Years: College
- DCU
College titles
- Sigerson titles: 2
Inter-county
- Years: County
- 2011 – present: Mayo
Inter-county titles
- Connacht titles: 7
- All-Irelands: 1
- NFL: 1
- All Stars: 0

Rob Hennelly (born 8 March 1990) is a Gaelic footballer who plays for Breaffy and Mayo.

== Mayo ==
Hennelly was part of the Mayo senior panel in 2009, and league panel for 2010, making his Senior debut for Mayo in London in 2011.

Hennelly left the Mayo panel in 2012 after being the number one goalkeeper throughout 2011, but returned to the panel in 2013 for the Connacht final when goalkeepers David Clarke and Kenneth O'Malley were both injured.

Hennelly retired in December 2024 but was persuaded by Andy Moran to return for the 2026 season.

On 26 July 2026 Hennelly won the 2026 All-Ireland Football Championship with Mayo.

== Work ==
Hennelly is VP of Commercial Development at CarTrawler.
