= Colm Boyle =

Mayo Gaelic footballer

Personal information
- Born: 29 July 1986 (age 40) Castlebar, County Mayo, Ireland
- Occupation: Garda (police officer)
- Height: 1.81 m (5 ft 11 in)

Sport
- Sport: Gaelic football (Peil Ghaelach)
- Position: Centre back
Club
- Years: Club
- Davitts
Inter-county
Years	County	Apps (scores)
2008–2021	Mayo	120
Inter-county titles
- Connacht titles: 6
- All-Irelands: 0
- All Stars: 4

Colm Boyle (born 29 July 1986) is a Gaelic footballer who plays for Davitts and, formerly, the Mayo county team. He won four All Star Awards and played in four finals of the All-Ireland Senior Football Championship, losing them all and scoring an own goal in the third.

== Playing career ==
Boyle won six Connacht Senior Football Championships and a National Football League title.

He started at left half-back in three All-Ireland SFC finals: the 2012 decider, which Mayo lost to Donegal (by a scoreline of 0–13 to 2–11, or four points) and the 2013 decider, which Mayo lost to Dublin (by a scoreline of 1–14 to 2-12, or one point). The 2017 All-Ireland Senior Football Championship final, his fourth, was the third final in which he started at left half-back and it was another loss to Dublin.

Before that he started in the centre in the 2016 All-Ireland Senior Football Championship final as Mayo lost again, though Dublin needed a replay on this occasion.

He missed the 2020 and 2021 All-Ireland Senior Football Championship final losses to Dublin and Tyrone respectively, due to a torn anterior cruciate ligament, and retired from inter-county football at the end of 2021.

Boyle made an appearance for Ireland against Australia in the 2013 International Rules Series, scoring a total of one over.

Boyle attended St Colman's College, Claremorris. Ahead of the 2023 season, he was named coach and selector of the Mayo minor team ahead of the 2023 season.
