= Jack Barry (Gaelic footballer) =

Kerry Gaelic footballer

Personal information
- Born: 24 December 1994 (age 31)
- Height: 1.90 m (6 ft 3 in)

Sport
- Sport: Gaelic football
- Position: Midfield
Club
- Years: Club
- Na Gaeil
Inter-county
Years	County	Apps (scores)
2017–2023	Kerry	16 (0-05)
Inter-county titles
- Munster titles: 6
- All-Irelands: 1
- NFL: 3

Jack Barry (born 24 December 1994) is a Gaelic footballer who plays for the Na Gaeil club and formerly of the Kerry county team.

== Underage ==
Barry played for the Kerry minor team in 2012 and the 2015 under-21 team, bit had little success in either grade.

He made his league debut against Donegal in 2017 and his senior championship debut against Clare in 2017.

Barry started for Kerry in the 2019 All-Ireland Senior Football Championship Final drawn game, departing late on with an injury, but was back for the start of the replay.

== Honours ==
Na Gaeil

- Kerry Intermediate Football Championship (1) 2021
- Munster Intermediate Club Football Championship (1) 2021
- Kerry Junior Football Championship (1) 2019
- Munster Junior Club Football Championship (1) 2019
- All-Ireland Junior Club Football Championship (1) 2020

St Brendan's District

- Kerry Minor Football Championship (1): 2012

Kerry

- All-Ireland Senior Football Championship: (1) 2022
- Munster Senior Football Championship: (6) 2017, 2018, 2019, 2021, 2022, 2023
- National Football League: (3) 2017, 2020, 2021 (shared)
- McGrath Cup: (1) 2017
