= Kevin Keane =

Irish Gaelic footballer

Personal information
- Native name: Caoimhín Ó Cathain (Irish)
- Born: 1990 (age 35–36) Castlebar, Ireland
- Height: 1.83 m (6 ft 0 in)

Sport
- Sport: Gaelic football
- Position: Right corner/Full-back
Club
- Years: Club
- 2007–: Westport
Inter-county
- Years: County
- 2012–2016: Mayo
Inter-county titles
- Connacht titles: 4

Kevin Keane (born 1990) is a Gaelic footballer who plays for Westport. He previously played for the Mayo county team.

He started at right corner-back in the 2012 All-Ireland SFC Final, which Mayo lost by four points to Donegal.

Keane was sent off for slapping Michael Murphy in an off-the-ball incident during Mayo's 2015 All-Ireland SFC quarter-final against Donegal.

He attended Rice College and played football for the school. Lee Keegan attended Rice College at the same time and played with Keegan on the school team.
