= David Clarke (Gaelic footballer) =

Mayo Gaelic football goalkeeper

Personal information
- Native name: Daithí Ó Cléirigh (Irish)
- Born: 27 November 1983 (age 42) Castlebar, Ireland
- Occupation: Garda
- Height: 1.9 m (6 ft 3 in)

Sport
- Sport: Gaelic football
- Position: Goalkeeper
Club
- Years: Club
- 2001–: Ballina Stephenites
Club titles
- Mayo titles: 5
- Connacht titles: 2
- All-Ireland Titles: 1
Inter-county*
Years	County	Apps (scores)
2001–2021	Mayo	133
Inter-county titles
- Connacht titles: 8
- All-Irelands: 0
- NFL: 1
- All Stars: 2
- *Inter County team apps and scores correct as of 5 January 2021.

David Clarke (born 27 November 1983) is a Gaelic footballer who plays for Ballina Stephenites. He also played for the Mayo county team until his retirement in 2021.

He played in the 2006 All-Ireland Final defeat to Kerry and the 2012 All-Ireland final which Mayo lost by 0-13 to 2-11 against Donegal. He also played in the 2016 All-Ireland Final against Dublin, starting the first match before being dropped for the second, only to come on as a second-half substitute to face a penalty he was unable to save; Mayo lost by a single point. Clarke announced his retirement from inter-county football in January 2021.
