= Séamus O'Shea =

Mayo Gaelic footballer

Personal information
- Native name: Séamus Ó Sé (Irish)
- Born: 1987 (age 38–39) Westmeath, Ireland
- Height: 1.89 m (6 ft 2 1/2 in)

Sport
- Sport: Gaelic football
- Position: Midfield
Club
- Years: Club
- 2003–: Breaffy
Inter-county
Years	County	Apps (scores)
2008–2020	Mayo	51 (0–0)
Inter-county titles
- Connacht titles: 5

Séamus O'Shea (born 1987) is a Gaelic footballer who plays for Breaffy and, formerly, the Mayo county team. He is the brother of Mayo players Aidan and Conor. Seamie was man-of-the-match in the 2013 Connacht Senior Football Championship final against London. He was nominated for an All-Star in 2013. O'Shea came on as a substitute in the 2012 All-Ireland SFC final, which Mayo lost by 0–13 to 2–11 (four points) against Donegal. In the 2013 All-Ireland SFC final, he started at midfield as Mayo lost by one point to Dublin.
