= Brian Fenton =

Dublin Gaelic footballer (born 1993)

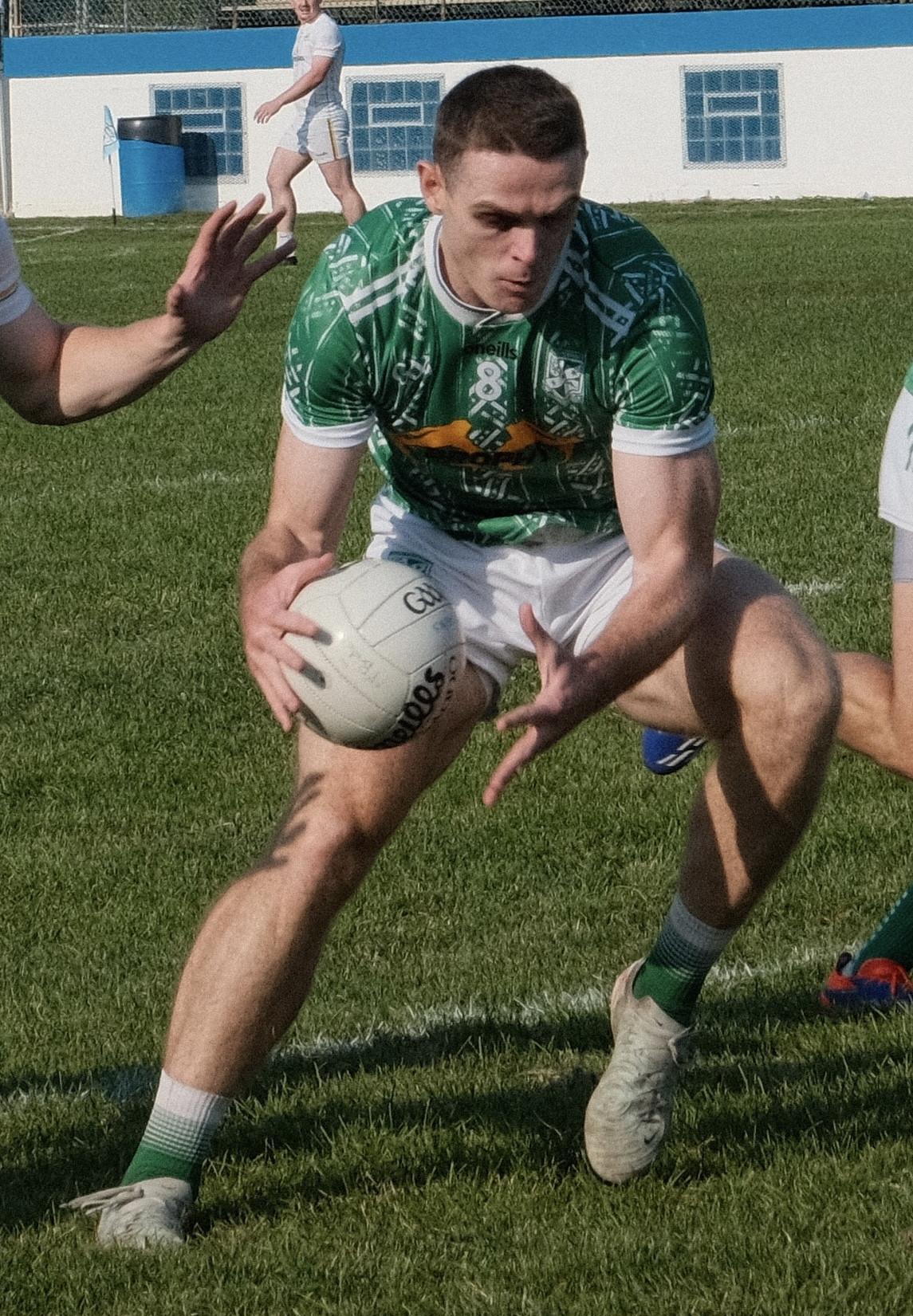

Personal information
- Born: 2 March 1993 (age 33) Dublin, Ireland
- Height: 6’7 1.98 m (6 ft 6 in)

Sport
- Sport: Gaelic football
- Position: Midfield
Club
- Years: Club
- Raheny
Inter-county*
Years	County	Apps (scores)
2015–2024	Dublin	64 (4–72)
Inter-county titles
- Leinster titles: 10
- All-Irelands: 7
- NFL: 4
- All Stars: 6
- *Inter County team apps and scores correct as of match played 29 June 2024.

Brian Fenton (born 2 March 1993) is a Gaelic footballer who plays for the Raheny club and previously for the Dublin county team. He was the 2018 and 2020 GAA/GPA Footballer of the Year.

== Education and family ==
His father (Brian senior), is from Spa, outside Killarney. The family home is in Raheny. Initially training as a physiotherapist, Fenton studied for a Masters in Business Management so that he could embark on a new career selling hospital and clinic equipment as a medical sales representative with Tekno Surgical. He bought his own house in Killester.

== Playing career ==
=== Inter-county ===
Fenton was a member of the Dublin team that won an All-Ireland Under-21 Football Championship in 2014.

In 2015 Fenton made his senior debut, starting a national league game against Monaghan where he quickly scored a goal in a strong win. He won the National Football League and the Leinster Senior Football Championship with Dublin, starting both games in midfield.

Fenton was named as the Man of the Match in the 2015 All-Ireland Final, as Dublin defeated Kerry on a 0–12 to 0–9 scoreline.

Fenton won the League title with Dublin in 2016 against Kerry in the final, scoring a point in the game. He was a key performer in Dublin retaining the Sam Maguire cup in 2016 which Dublin won after defeating Mayo by a single point after a replay. He won his second All Star award in as many seasons and named on the shortlist for Footballer of the Year, which was ultimately won by Mayo's Lee Keegan.

In 2017 Fenton was part of the Dublin team defeated in the National League final by Kerry, losing on a scoreline of 0–20 to 1–16. Despite this, he was crucial in Dublin retaining their Leinster title while beating a record held since the 70's by winning 7 championships in a row. Dublin retained their All Ireland title defeating Mayo in the final again by a single point after Dean Rock kicked a match winning free kick late in injury time. Fenton also scored a point to help Dublin over the line on a scoreline of 1–17 to 1–16.

Fenton continued his success with Dublin in 2018, winning the National Football League, the Leinster and All-Ireland Championships. He was awarded an All Star and named the Footballer of the Year for his performances.

On 14 September 2019, Fenton was a key player in Dublin's conquerage of Kerry to win the elusive five Sam Maguires in a row, which had never been done by any team before, though some teams came close with the four-in-a-row, including Kerry (twice).

During Dublin's five-in-a-row, Fenton spent more time on the field of play than any other Dublin player, starting 35 of the 37 matches in the championship.

Fenton played every minute of Dublin's historic six All Ireland's in a row campaign.

On 18 November 2024, Fenton announced his retirement from inter-county football.

== Reception ==
Colm O'Rourke has described Fenton as "one of the best midfielders ever".

== Career statistics ==
As of match played 29 June 2024

	Year	National League			Leinster		All-Ireland		Total	
	Year	Division	Apps	Score	Apps	Score	Apps	Score	Apps	Score
Dublin	2015	Division 1			3	0-01	4	0-02	7	0-03
Dublin	2016	Division 1			3	0-01	4	0-02	7	0-03
Dublin	2017	Division 1			3	0-02	3	0-02	6	0-04
Dublin	2018	Division 1			3	1-08	4	0-04	7	1-12
Dublin	2019	Division 1			3	1-04	5	2-04	8	3-08
Dublin	2020	Division 1			3	0-04	2	0-05	5	0-09
Dublin	2021	Division 1			3	0-03	1	0-00	4	0-03
Dublin	2022	Division 1			3	0-08	2	0-03	5	0-11
Dublin	2023	Division 1			3	0-03	6	0-06	9	0-09
Dublin	2024	Division 1			2	0-04	4	0-06	6	0-10
Career total					29	2-38	35	2-34	64	4-72

== Honours ==
Dublin

- All-Ireland Senior Football Championship (7): 2015, 2016, 2017, 2018, 2019, 2020, 2023
- Leinster Senior Football Championship (10): 2015, 2016, 2017, 2018, 2019, 2020, 2021, 2022, 2023,2024
- National Football League Division 1 (4): 2015, 2016, 2018, 2021 (Shared)
- National Football League Division 2 (1): 2023
- All-Ireland Under-21 Football Championship (1): 2014
- Leinster Under-21 Football Championship (1): 2014

Individual

- GAA-GPA All Stars Awards (6): 2015, 2016, 2018, 2019, 2020, 2023
- GAA/GPA Footballer of the Year (2): 2018, 2020
- All-Ireland Senior Football Championship Final Man of the Match (1): 2015
- The Sunday Game Team of the Year (1): 2023
- In May 2020, a public poll conducted by RTÉ.ie named Fenton at midfield alongside Jack O'Shea in a team of footballers who had won All Stars during the era of The Sunday Game.

Awards
Preceded by Paul Murphy (Kerry)	All-Ireland Senior Football Final; Man of the Match; 2015	Succeeded by John Small (Dublin) (Drawn Game)
Preceded by Andy Moran (Mayo)	GAA/GPA Footballer of the Year; 2018	Succeeded by Stephen Cluxton (Dublin)
Preceded by Stephen Cluxton (Dublin)	GAA/GPA Footballer of the Year; 2020	Succeeded by Kieran McGeary (Tyrone)
