= Tomás Brady =

Irish Gaelic footballer and hurler

Personal information
- Native name: Tomás Ó Brádaigh (Irish)
- Born: 6 November 1987 (age 38) Dublin, Ireland
- Occupation: Property Development
- Height: 1.86 m (6 ft 1 in)

Sport
- Football Position: Midfield / Half Forward
- Hurling Position: Full Back
Club
- Years: Club
- 2005–: Na Fianna
Inter-county
- Years: County
- 2006–2012 2013–2016: Dublin (hurling); Dublin (football)
Inter-county titles
	Football	Hurling
Leinster Titles	4	0
All-Ireland Titles	3	0
League titles	4	2

Tomás Brady (born 6 November 1987) is a Gaelic footballer and hurler who played for Na Fianna and Dublin.

== Hurling ==
Brady won the 2005 Leinster Minor Hurling Championship with Dublin in 2005. He went on to make his debut for the Dublin senior hurlers against Wexford in the Walsh Cup at Parnell Park in 2006. Brady represented Dublin at both U-21 hurling and Gaelic football level in 2006, 2007 and 2008. He won the Leinster Under-21 Hurling Championship with Dublin against Offaly in July 2007. It was Dublin's first Under-21 trophy since 1972. Brady won a National Hurling League title with Dublin in 2011.

== Football ==
Brady switched codes in 2012 by announcing that he would be concentrating on inter-county football instead of hurling. He will work under the new Dublin manager Jim Gavin.

Brady's switch to football was described as "very disappointing" by the Dublin Senior Hurling manager Anthony Daly, but he wished him the best of luck in his future season with the senior footballers.

Brady twice ruptured his anterior cruciate ligament, first in 2011 and for the second time in 2013.

Tomas won 3 All Ireland medals in 2013, 2015 and 2016. He is also the only Dublin GAA player to win Division 1 National League titles in both hurling and football.
