= Barry Moran =

Mayo Gaelic footballer

Personal information
- Native name: Barra Ó Móráin (Irish)
- Born: Castlebar, Ireland
- Height: 1.95 m (6 ft 5 in)

Sport
- Sport: Gaelic football
- Position: Midfield
Club
- Years: Club
- Castlebar Mitchels
Club titles
- Mayo titles: 4
- Connacht titles: 2
Inter-county
- Years: County
- 2005–2018: Mayo
Inter-county titles
- Connacht titles: 6
- All-Irelands: 0
- NFL: 0
- All Stars: 0

Barry Moran is a former Gaelic footballer who played at senior level for the Mayo county team until his retirement in July 2018. Moran also played club football for Castlebar Mitchels.

He started at midfield in the 2012 All-Ireland SFC final, which Mayo lost by 0–13 to 2–11 (one point) against Donegal.
