= Brendan Harrison =

Mayo Gaelic footballer

Personal information
- Native name: Breandán Ó'Horoho (Irish)
- Born: 21 October 1992 (age 34) Kilkelly, Ireland
- Height: 1.83 m (6 ft 0 in)

Sport
- Sport: Gaelic football
- Position: Right corner-back
Club
- Years: Club
- Aghamore
Inter-county
- Years: County
- 2016–2023: Mayo
Inter-county titles
- All Stars: 1

Brendan Harrison (born 21 October 1992) is a Gaelic footballer who plays for Aghamore and, formerly, for the Mayo county team.
