= Michael Savage (Gaelic footballer) =

Irish Gaelic footballer

Personal information
- Native name: Micheál Mac Sabhaois (Irish)
- Born: 9 September 1986 (age 40) Dublin, Ireland
- Height: 1.85 m (6 ft 1 in)

Sport
- Sport: Gaelic football
- Position: Goalkeeper
Club
- Years: Club
- St Vincent's
Club titles
- Dublin titles: 3
- Leinster titles: 3
- All-Ireland Titles: 2
Inter-county
- Years: County
- 2008-: Dublin
Inter-county titles
- Leinster titles: 3
- All-Irelands: 1
- NFL: 1
- All Stars: 0

Michael Savage (born 9 September 1986) is a Gaelic football goalkeeper who plays for the St Vincent's club and for the Dublin county team.
