= David Byrne (Gaelic footballer) =

Irish Gaelic footballer

Personal information
- Nickname: Bulldog
- Born: Dublin, Ireland

Sport
- Sport: Gaelic football
- Position: Full Back
Club
- Years: Club
- 2012–: Naomh Ólaf
Inter-county
- Years: County
- 2013–2023: Dublin
Inter-county titles
- Leinster titles: 10
- All-Irelands: 8
- NFL: 4
- All Stars: 0

David 'Davy' Byrne is a Gaelic footballer who plays for the Naomh Olaf club in Sandyford and for the Dublin county team.

Achievements
Preceded by Liam McGrath (Tipperary)	All-Ireland Minor Football Final winning captain 2012	Succeeded by Stephen Coen (Mayo)
