= John Small (Gaelic footballer) =

Irish Gaelic footballer (born 1993)

Personal information
- Born: 10 January 1993 (age 33) Dublin, Ireland

Sport
- Sport: Gaelic football
- Position: Centre-back
Club
- Years: Club
- Ballymun Kickhams
Club titles
- Dublin titles: 2
- Leinster titles: 1
Inter-county
- Years: County
- 2012–2025: Dublin
Inter-county titles
- Leinster titles: 10
- All-Irelands: 7
- NFL: 4
- All Stars: 1

John Small (born 10 January 1993) is a Gaelic footballer who plays for the Ballymun Kickhams club and, previously, at senior level for the Dublin county team.

== Playing career ==
Small was a member of the Dublin team that won an All-Ireland Under-21 Football Championship title in 2014. He came on as a substitute in the 2015 All-Ireland SFC final, as Dublin defeated Kerry on a 0–12 to 0–9 scoreline.

In October 2025, Small announced his retirement from inter-county football.

== Honours ==
Dublin

- All-Ireland Senior Football Championship (7): 2015, 2016, 2017, 2018, 2019, 2020, 2023
- Leinster Senior Football Championship (10): 2015, 2016, 2017, 2018, 2019, 2020, 2021, 2022, 2023, 2024
- National Football League (4): 2014, 2015, 2016, 2018
- All-Ireland Under-21 Football Championship (1): 2014
- Leinster Under-21 Football Championship (1): 2014

Ballymun Kickhams

- Leinster Senior Club Football Championship (1): 2012
- Dublin Senior Football Championship (2): 2012, 2020

Individual

- All Star (1): 2020
- All-Ireland SFC Final Man of the Match (1): 2016 (Drawn Game)

Awards
Preceded by Brian Fenton (Dublin)	All-Ireland SFC final Man of the Match; 2016 (Drawn Game)	Succeeded by Michael Fitzsimons (Dublin) (Replay)
