= Aogán Ó Fearghail =

Irish sports administrator (born 1959)

Aogán Ó Fearghail (pronounced [ˈiːɡaːn̪ˠ oː ˈfʲaɾˠɣiːlʲ]; born 1959) is an Irish sports administrator who was the 38th president of the Gaelic Athletic Association.

== Administrative career ==
From Maudabawn, Drumgoon in County Cavan, Ó Fearghail was the first Cavan president in the 130-year history of the GAA. He became the seventh man from Ulster to have acquired the role.

Ó Fearghail was elected to the position at the 2014 GAA Congress in Dublin. Out of a total vote of 310, he received 170 votes, while Sheamus Howlin from Wexford came second with 83 and Seán Walsh of Kerry came third with 57.

Ó Fearghail officially took over as GAA president on 28 February 2015 at the GAA's Annual Congress at the Slieve Russell Hotel in Cavan, and was succeeded by John Horan.

Ó Fearghail worked his way from his native Drumgoon Éire Óg club, serving at all levels with club, county, province and at national level. As a GAA coach, he coached his club Drumgoon Eire Og under-12s for 25 years, and built the club from junior "also-rans" to one of Cavan's strongest club units. He played hurling with Erins Hope at St Patrick's College, Drumcondra, and has also played handball at the highest levels.

== Personal life ==
Ó Fearghail is a member of the HSE, and was previously a primary school principal at St Patrick's National School, Dernakesh, in his native parish of Drumgoon in Cavan, and also runs many businesses with his wife.

Together they managed the family shop and post office and jointly built and ran a Cultural Centre in County Cavan. Ó Fearghail has published local histories and is a contributor to historical seminars and heritage events. He was also for many years principal of a Gaeltacht summer college in Gortahork, County Donegal, where he spends much free time.

Sporting positions
Preceded by Liam O'Neill	President of the Gaelic Athletic Association; 2015–2018	Succeeded by John Horan
