= Michael Fitzsimons =

Dublin Gaelic footballer

Personal information
- Born: 9 April 1989 (age 37) Dublin, Ireland
- Occupation: Doctor
- Height: 1.87 m (6 ft 2 in)

Sport
- Sport: Gaelic football
- Position: Corner Back, Full Back
Club
- Years: Club
- 2007–: Cuala
Club titles
- Dublin titles: 1
- Leinster titles: 1
- All-Ireland Titles: 1
Inter-county
| Years | County | Apps (scores) |
| 2010–2024 | Dublin | 22 (0-00) |
Inter-county titles
- Leinster titles: 14
- All-Irelands: 9
- NFL: 5
- All Stars: 5

Michael Fitzsimons (born 9 April 1989) is an Irish Gaelic footballer who plays for Cuala in Dalkey as formerly for the Dublin county team. He is the most decorated male intercounty gaelic footballer of all time, alongside Stephen Cluxton and James McCarthy, having won nine All Ireland Football Championships.

== Dublin Senior ==
Cuala is a traditional hurling stronghold in Dublin and he was only the second player from Cuala to play inter-county football along with Mick Holden. He was notably not selected for Dublin underage teams and was also on the “B” Minor (under 18 team) at Cuala.

He plays fullback for Dublin and made his senior championship debut in 2010 against Wexford. He won an All-Ireland Junior Football Championship and Leinster Junior Football Championship medal with Dublin in 2008. Michael won the Leinster Senior Football Championship with Dublin in July 2011 at Croke Park against Wexford. He won the All-Ireland Senior Football Championship with Dublin in September 2011 against Kerry at Croke Park. He won his second and third All Ireland titles in 2013 and 2015 with Dublin respectively. Michael won his fourth all-Ireland medal with Dublin in a replay against Mayo at Croke. He was awarded man of the match for his contribution during the game.

== Personal life ==
He was educated at Johnstown Boys Primary, Killiney and C.B.C. Monkstown which is a rugby school. He holds a degree in physiotherapy from UCD. After working as a physiotherapist for several years, he returned to UCD to study medicine and now is a doctor.

== Honours ==
Dublin

- All-Ireland Senior Football Championship (9): 2011, 2013, 2015, 2016, 2017, 2018, 2019, 2020, 2023
- Leinster Senior Football Championship (14): 2011, 2012, 2013, 2014, 2015, 2016, 2017, 2018, 2019, 2020, 2021, 2022, 2023, 2024
- National Football League (5): 2013, 2014, 2015, 2016, 2018
- All-Ireland Junior Football Championship (1): 2008
- Leinster Junior Football Championship (1): 2008

Cuala

- All-Ireland Senior Club Football Championship: 2024-25
- Leinster Senior Club Football Championship: 2024
- Dublin Senior Football Championship: 2024
- Dublin Senior B Football Championship: 2020

Individual

- All Star (5): 2017, 2019, 2018, 2020, 2023
- All-Ireland Senior Football Championship Final Man of the Match (1): 2016 (replay)
- The Sunday Game Team of the Year (1): 2023

Awards
| Preceded by John Small (Dublin) (Drawn Game) | All-Ireland SFC final Man of the Match; 2016 (Replay) | Succeeded by James McCarthy (Dublin) |
