= Cormac Costello =

Irish Gaelic footballer

Personal information
- Native name: Cormac Mac Coisdealbha (Irish)
- Born: 18 July 1994 (age 32) Perth, Australia
- Occupation: Teacher
- Height: 1.83 m (6 ft 0 in)

Sport
- Sport: Gaelic football
- Position: Left corner forward
Club
- Years: Club
- Whitehall Colmcille
Inter-county*
Years	County	Apps (scores)
2013 -	Dublin	53 (8-147)
Inter-county titles
- Leinster titles: 12
- All-Irelands: 8
- NFL: 5
- All Stars: 0
- *Inter County team apps and scores correct as of match played 29 June 2024.

Cormac Costello (born 18 July 1994) is a Gaelic football forward for the Dublin county team, with which he has won eight All-Ireland Senior Football Championship medals and five National Football League medals. The former Ardscoil Rís student plays his club football for Whitehall Colmcille.

Costello won an All-Ireland Minor Football Championship in 2012, then an All-Ireland Under 21 Football Championship in May 2014 In 2014, he was a sub in the quarter-final victory over Laois in the Leinster Senior Championship. He scored three points in the game. During the semi-final victory over Wexford he was a sub again and he scored 1-05. He won a Leinster Senior Championship against Meath in 2014. He was a sub and scored one point in the game. In the All-Ireland quarter-final Costello was a sub again and managed one point in a one-sided game against Monaghan. He was selected at corner forward against Donegal but Dublin crashed out in the semi-final.

On 1 October 2016, Costello came off the bench and scored three points as Dublin won the All-Ireland final after a replay with Mayo.

== Career statistics ==
As of match played 29 June 2024

Team	Season	National League			Leinster		All-Ireland		Total	
Team	Season	Division	Apps	Score	Apps	Score	Apps	Score	Apps	Score
Dublin	2013	Division 1			1	0-00	2	0-01	3	0-01
Dublin	2014	Division 1			3	1-09	0	0-00	3	1-09
Dublin	2015	Division 1			0	0-00	1	0-00	1	0-00
Dublin	2016	Division 1			1	0-00	2	0-03	3	0-03
Dublin	2017	Division 1			0	0-00	1	0-00	1	0-00
Dublin	2018	Division 1			1	0-04	5	0-14	6	0-18
Dublin	2019	Division 1			3	1-24	5	0-07	8	1-31
Dublin	2020	Division 1			3	0-07	2	0-01	5	0-08
Dublin	2021	Division 1			3	1-15	1	0-00	4	1-15
Dublin	2022	Division 1			3	2-06	2	1-01	5	3-07
Dublin	2023	Division 2			3	0-06	4	0-20	7	0-26
Dublin	2024	Division 1			3	0-11	4	2-18	7	2-29
Total					24	5-82	29	3-65	53	8-147

== Honours ==
- All-Ireland Senior Football Championship (8): 2013, 2015, 2016, 2017, 2018, 2019, 2020, 2023
- National Football League (5): 2013, 2014, 2015, 2016, 2018,
- Leinster Senior Football Championship (11): 2013, 2014, 2015, 2016, 2017, 2018, 2019, 2020, 2021, 2022, 2023
- All-Ireland Under-21 Football Championship (1): 2014
- Leinster Under-21 Football Championship (2), 2014, 2015
- All-Ireland Minor Football Championship (1): 2012
- Leinster Minor Football Championship (2): 2011, 2012
- Leinster Minor Hurling Championship (2): 2011, 2012
