= 2026 Mayo Senior Football Championship =

Gaelic football competition in Mayo, Ireland for the 2026 season

125th Mayo Senior Football Championship

Tournament details
- County: Mayo
- Province: Connacht
- Year: 2026
- Trophy: Paddy Moclair Cup
- Sponsor: Connacht Gold
- Date: 7 August – 25 October 2026
- Teams: 16
- Defending champions: Ballina Stephenites

Winners
- Champions: Castlebar Mitchels (32nd win)
- Manager: Kevin Filan
- Captain: John MacMonagle

Runners-up
- Runners-up: Garrymore
- Manager: Fintan Forde

Promotion/Relegation
- Relegated team(s): Balla

Other
- Matches played: 34
- Website: Mayo GAA

The 2026 Mayo Senior Football Championship is the 125th edition of the Mayo GAA's premier Gaelic football tournament for senior clubs in County Mayo, Ireland. Sixteen teams compete with the winners going on to represent Mayo in the Connacht Senior Club Football Championship. The championship starts with a group stage and progresses to a knock out stage. The winners receive the Paddy Moclair Cup.

Ballina Stephenites were the defending champions, winning their 39th Paddy Moclair Cup against Westport in the final. It was also their third SFC title in a row.

Kilmeena were the 2026 Mayo Intermediate Football Champions after defeating Moy Davitts, returning straight back to the senior grade after being relegated in the 2024 Mayo S.F.C. Ballyhaunis replaced them in the 2026 I.F.C after losing to Mayo Gaels in the relegation final.

The draw for the group stage of the championship took place on 16 February 2026.

Following defeat to Ballaghaderreen in the relegation final, Balla were relegated to the 2027 Mayo Intermediate Football Championship, playing there for the first time since 2020.

== Championship Structure ==
The 2026 Mayo S.F.C. consists of 16 teams drawn into four groups, each consisting of four teams. The semi-finalists from last years SFC are seeded and drawn into separate groups, with the 12 other teams drawn openly. The top two teams progress to the quarter-finals, while the bottom team in each group contests the relegation semi-finals. The losers of the semi-finals will playoff against one another for the right to retain their senior status into 2027.

== Team Changes ==
The following teams have changed division since the 2025 championship season:

=== To S.F.C. ===
Promoted from 2025 Mayo Intermediate Football Championship

- Kilmeena - (Intermediate Champions)

=== From S.F.C. ===
Relegated to 2026 Mayo Intermediate Football Championship

- Ballyhaunis

== Participating teams ==
The clubs competing in the 2026 Mayo S.F.C are:

Club	Location	Pre C'ship Odds	2025 Championship Position	2026 Championship Position	In championship since	Championship Titles (Pre 2026)	Last Championship Title (Pre 2026)
Aghamore	Aghamore	25/1	Relegation Semi-Finalist	Quarter-Finalist	2009	1	1977
Balla	Balla	25/1	Non-Qualifier	Relegated to Intermediate	2021	0	—
Ballaghaderreen	Ballaghaderreen	9/1	Quarter-Finalist	Relegation Finalist	1972	3	2012
Ballina Stephenites	Ballina	10/3	Champions	Non-Qualifier	—	39	2025
Ballintubber	Ballintubber	14/1	Quarter-Finalist	Non-Qualifier	2008	5	2019
Belmullet	Belmullet	25/1	Quarter-Finalist	Semi-Finalist	2019	0	—
Breaffy	Breaffy	7/1	Quarter-Finalist	Semi-Finalist	2005	0	—
Castlebar Mitchels	Castlebar	9/2	Non-Qualifier	Champions	2006	31	2017
Charlestown Sarsfields	Charlestown	40/1	Relegation Semi-Finalist	Relegation Semi-Finalist	2013	3	2001
Claremorris	Claremorris	25/1	Non-Qualifier	Quarter-Finalist	—	4	2009
Crossmolina Deel Rovers	Crossmolina	3/1	Semi-Finalist	Quarter-Finalist	2025	7	2006
Garrymore	Killeenrevagh	25/1	Non-Qualifier	Runners-Up	1972	6	1982
Kilmeena	Kilmeena	25/1	I.F.C. Champions	Non-Qualifier	2026	0	—
Knockmore	Knockmore	9/1	Semi-Finalist	Non-Qualifier	1973	10	2021
Mayo Gaels	Mayo	50/1	Relegation Finalist	Relegation Semi-Finalist	2022	0	—
Westport	Westport	9/4	Runners-Up	Quarter-Finalist	2017	1	2022

== Group Stage ==
=== Group 1 ===
Advance to knockout stage Advance to relegation play-off

Team	Matches				Score			Pts
Team	Pld	W	D	L	For	Against	Diff	Pts
Claremorris	3	3	0	0	69	57	+12	6
Westport	3	1	0	2	81	66	+15	2
Kilmeena	3	1	0	2	48	56	-8	2
Charlestown Sarsfields	3	1	0	2	46	65	-19	2

==== Round 1 ====
8 August 2026 Round 1	Westport	1-30 (33) – (14) 1-11	Charlestown Sarsfields	Westport
16:30 IST (UTC+1)
	Pts: Finbar McLoughlin 0-11, Killian Kilkelly 0-9, Colm Moran 1-0, Conal Dawson 0-3, Pat Lambert 0-2, Rory Brickenden 0-2, Tom Lambert 0-1, Ben Holmes 0-1	Report	Pts: Paul Towey 1-7, Ruairí Cullen 0-3, Paddy Goldrick 0-1	Referee: James Regan (Hollymount Carramore)

8 August 2026 Round 1	Kilmeena	0-13 (13) – (20) 3-11	Claremorris	Kilmeena
19:00 IST (UTC+1)		(HT: 0-07 – 1-08)
	Pts: John McGlynn 0-6, Caolach Ó Halligan 0-2, Darragh Keavney 0-2, Conor Madden 0-1, Jack Carney 0-1, Jack Mulchrone 0-1	Report	Pts: Niall Hurley 2-5, Dara Hurley 1-0, Conor McGuinness 0-2, Cathal Joyce 0-1, Mark Maloney 0-1, Paul Gilmore 0-1, Stephen Gill 0-1	Referee: Ronan Gurren (Aghamore)

==== Round 2 ====
22 August 2026 Round 2	Charlestown Sarsfields	2-11 (17) – (14) 1-11	Kilmeena	Charlestown
16:00 IST (UTC+1)		(HT: 1-08 – 0-04)		Venue: Fr O'Hara Park
	Pts: Paul Towey 1-5 (1tpf, 1tp, 1f), Jack Carney 1-0 (og) Conor McArdle 0-2 (tp), Patrick Goldrick 0-1, Gareth O'Donnell 0-1, Alan Woods 0-1, Matthew Lenehen 0-1	Report	Pts: Caolach Halligan 0-4 (1tp), Paul Groden 1-0 (pen), Conor Madden 0-2, Jack Carney 0-2 (tp), Colin Hastings 0-1, Liam Moore 0-1, John McGlynn 0-1 (f)	Referee: Kevin Connelly (Hollymount Carramore)

22 August 2026 Round 2	Claremorris	1-28 (31) – (29) 6-11	Westport	Claremorris
18:30 IST (UTC+1)
	Pts: Niall Hurley 1-9, Cathal Joyce 0-9, Mark Maloney 0-3, Dara Hurley 0-3, Jack Noone 0-2, Paul Gilmore 0-1, James Stretton 0-1	Report	Pts: Ben Holmes 2-1, Joey Holmes 2-0, Killian Kilkelly 0-5, Brian O'Malley 1-0, Luke Tunney 1-0, Finbar McLoughlin 0-2, Lee Keegan 0-2, Conal Dawson 0-1	Referee: Liam Devenney (Ballina Stephenites)

==== Round 3 ====
5 September 2026 Round 3	Kilmeena	2-15 (21) – (19) 2-13	Westport	Castlebar
16:00 IST (UTC+1)		(HT: 0-06 – 1-07)		Venue: Castlebar Mitchels GAA
	Pts: Cormac O'Malley 0-5 (1tp), Darragh Slattery 0-5 (2tpf, 1f), Caolach Halligan 1-1, Liam Moore 1-0, Jack Carney 0-2 (tp), Ronan O'Donnell 0-1, Darragh Keaveney 0-1	Report	Pts: Killian Kilkelly 1-4 (1pen, 2f), Rory Brickenden 1-0, Ben Holmes 0-2, Conal Dawson 0-2 (tp), Finbar McLaughlin 0-1, Luke Tunney 0-1, Lee Keegan 0-1, Joey Holmes 0-1, Kevin Keane 0-1	Referee: Jerome Henry (Castlebar Mitchels)

5 September 2026 Round 3	Charlestown Sarsfields	1-12 (15) – (18) 0-18	Claremorris	Aghamore
16:00 IST (UTC+1)				Venue: Aghamore GAA
	Pts: Paul Towey 0-6, Matthew Lenehan 1-1, Gareth O'Donnell 0-2, Eoin Murphy 0-1, Ben Crean 0-1, Cian Towey 0-1	Report	Pts: Niall Hurley 0-9, Cathal Joyce 0-3, Dara Hurley 0-3, Mark Maloney 0-2, Conor McGuinness 0-1	Referee: Vincent Neary (Bonniconlon)

=== Group 2 ===
Advance to knockout stage Advance to relegation play-off

Team	Matches				Score			Pts
Team	Pld	W	D	L	For	Against	Diff	Pts
Garrymore	3	3	0	0	49	35	+14	6
Castlebar Mitchels	3	2	0	1	56	42	+14	4
Ballina Stephenites	3	1	0	2	45	53	-8	2
Balla	3	0	0	3	38	58	-20	0

==== Round 1 ====
7 August 2026 Round 1	Balla	0-10 (10) – (22) 2-16	Castlebar Mitchels	Balla
19:00 IST (UTC+1)		(HT: 0-02 – 0-12)
	Pts: Conor Walsh 0-2, Liam Glynn 0-2 (1f), Colm Murphy 0-2 (tp), Cillian Golding 0-1, David Dolan 0-1 ('45), Oisín Cronin 0-1 (f), Ryan Fadden 0-1	Report	Pts: Cian Walsh 1-5, Anthony O'Boyle 1-0, Bob Tuohy 0-2 (tp), Ethan Gibbons 0-2 (tpf), Calum Filan 0-2 (1f), James Durcan 0-1, Neil Douglas 0-1, Patrick Durcan 0-1, Rory Byrne 0-1 (f), Seán Morahan 0-1	Referee: Liam Devenney (Ballina Stephenites)

8 August 2026 Round 1	Ballina Stephenites	0-11 (11) – (15) 1-12	Garrymore	Ballina
16:30 IST (UTC+1)		(HT: 0-02 – 0-06)		Venue: James Stephens Park
	Pts: Evan Regan 0-5 (1tpf), Frank Irwin 0-2, Luke Feeney 0-1, Mikey Murray 0-1, Niall Feeney 0-1, Patrick Carr 0-1	Report	Pts: Darren Quinn 0-6, Caolan Crowe 1-0, Andrew Glennon 0-2 (tpf), Trevor Nally 0-2, Eoin McGreal 0-1, Liam Horkan 0-1	Referee: Liam Devenney (Ballina Stephenites)

==== Round 2 ====
21 August 2026 Round 2	Garrymore	1-12 (15) – (10) 0-10	Balla	Killeenrevagh
18:30 IST (UTC+1)
	Pts: Eoin McGreal 1-0, Darren Quinn 0-3, Garry Golden 0-2, Trevor Nally 0-2, Andrew Glennon 0-2, Enda Hession 0-1, Shane Nally 0-1, Cathal Slattery 0-1	Report	Pts: Luke Flatley 0-4, Liam Glynn 0-2, David Dolan 0-2, Oisín Cronin 0-1, Gary McHale 0-1	Referee: Shane Corcoran (Islandeady)

21 August 2026 Round 2	Castlebar Mitchels	1-17 (20) – (13) 1-10	Ballina Stephenites	Castlebar
18:30 IST (UTC+1)		(HT: 0-11 – 1-06)
	Pts: Neil Douglas 1-1, Calum Filan 0-4 (2f), James Durcan 0-4 (1tp), Paddy Durcan 0-2 (tp), Bob Tuohy 0-2 (tp), Rory Byrne 0-2 (tpf), Cian Walsh 0-2	Report	Pts: Patrick Carr 0-3 (1tpf, 1f), David Tighe 1-0, Mikey Murray 0-2, Conor Jordan 0-2, Conor McStay 0-2	Referee: Ronan Gurren (Aghamore)

==== Round 3 ====
4 September 2026 Round 3	Castlebar Mitchels	0-14 (14) – (19) 0-19	Garrymore	Hollymount
20:00 IST (UTC+1)				Venue: Flanagan Park
	Pts: Neil Douglas 0-3, James Duncan 0-2, Anthony O'Boyle 0-2, Paddy Duncan 0-2, Joe Forry 0-1, Fintan Borotto 0-1, Seán Morahan 0-1, Bob Tuohy 0-1, Calum Filan 0-1, Cian Walsh 0-1	Report	Pts: Darren Quinn 0-6, Mark Gibbons 0-4, Trevor Nally 0-3, David Dolan 0-1, Eoin McGreal 0-1, Cathal Slattery 0-1, Colin Commins 0-1, Aaron Hughes 0-1, Adam Gallagher 0-1	Referee: Liam Devenney (Ballina Stephenites)

5 September 2026 Round 3	Balla	2-12 (18) – (21) 1-18	Ballina Stephenites	Foxford
16:30 IST (UTC+1)		(HT: 0-06 – 0-07)		Venue: Moy Davitts GAA
	Pts: Conor Walsh 1-0, Odhran O'Connor 1-0, David Dolan 0-3 (1tpf, 1'45), Cillian Golding 0-2 (tp), Colm Murphy 0-2 (2f), Ryan Fadden 0-2, Luke Flatley 0-1, Shaun Dempsey 0-1, Oisín Cronin 0-1	Report	Pts: Frank Irwin 0-9 (1tpf, 6f), Niall Feeney 1-1, Patrick Carr 0-2, Conor Jordan 0-2, Mike Murray 0-2, Ciarán Treacy 0-1, David Tighe 0-1	Referee: Frank Flynn (Aghamore)

=== Group 3 ===
Advance to knockout stage Advance to relegation play-off

Team	Matches				Score			Pts
Team	Pld	W	D	L	For	Against	Diff	Pts
Aghamore	3	2	1	0	62	49	+13	5
Crossmolina Deel Rovers	3	1	2	0	62	55	+7	4
Ballintubber	3	1	0	2	63	67	-4	2
Mayo Gaels	3	0	1	2	52	68	-16	1

==== Round 1 ====
8 August 2026 Round 1	Mayo Gaels	0-17 (17) – (26) 2-20	Aghamore	Mayo
16:30 IST (UTC+1)		(HT: 0-07 – 1-09)
	Pts: Peter Gallagher 0-3 (1f, 1tp), David Quinn 0-3 (1tp), John Gallagher 0-3, (2f), Ethan Henry 0-2 (tp), Jack Fallon 0-2 (tp), Andrew Gallagher 0-2, Adam Gallagher 0-1, Ronan Commons 0-1	Report	Pts: Liam Lavin 1-5, Fergal Boland 0-7 (1tp), Cillian Mooney 1-1, Derry Óx Cox 0-3, Tom O'Flaherty 0-1, Conall Breslin 0-1, Ross Egan 0-1, Brendan Harrison 0-1	Referee: Vincent Neary (Bonniconlon)

8 August 2026 Round 1	Crossmolina Deel Rovers	1-26 (29) – (22) 0-22	Ballintubber	Crossmolina
18:45 IST (UTC+1)		(HT: 0-15 – 0-11)
	Pts: James Maheady 0-7, Oisín Deane 0-5, Dylan Flynn 0-4 (1tpf, 1tp), Conor Loftus 0-4 (1tp), Jordan Flynn 1-0, Cillan Fergus 0-2 (tp), Diarmuid Coggins 0-1, Niall Coggins 0-1, Diarmuid Walsh 0-1, Josh Moyles 0-1	Report	Pts: Cillian O'Connor 0-5 (2tpf, 1f), Ciaran Gavin 0-5 (1tpf, 1tp), Stephen O'Malley 0-4 (1tpf), Josh Mahon 0-3, Michael Plunkett 0-2, Noel Geraghty 0-1, Keelan McDonnell 0-1, Oran Murphy 0-1	Referee: John Glavey (Aghamore)

==== Round 2 ====
21 August 2026 Round 2	Aghamore	1-14 (17) – (17) 0-17	Crossmolina Deel Rovers	Aghamore
18:30 IST (UTC+1)
	Pts: Liam Lavin 0-4, Brendan Harrison 0-3, Derry Ox Cox 1-0, Cillian Mooney 0-1, James Lyons 0-1, Conor Hunt 0-1, Jack O'Connor 0-1, Tom O'Flaherty 0-1, Ross Egan 0-1, Adam Byrne 0-1		Pts: James Maheady 0-8, Conor Loftus 0-3, Diarmuid Coggins 0-3, Mikie Loftus 0-1, Kevin Mulhern 0-1, Oisín Deane 0-1	Referee: Garry Owen McMahon

23 August 2026 Round 2	Ballintubber	1-23 (26) – (19) 2-13	Mayo Gaels	Ballintubber
14:00 IST (UTC+1)		(HT: 1-08 – 1-03)		Venue: Ray Prendergast Memorial Park
	Pts: Stephen O'Malley 1-4, Cillian O'Connor 0-6 (1tp, 2f), Ciaran Gavin 0-6 (2tp), Keelan McDonnell 0-3, Josh Mahon 0-2, Michael Plunkett 0-1, Bryan Walsh 0-1, Ethan Lyons 0-1, Jason Gibbons 0-1	Report	Pts: Josh Gallagher 0-9 (2tp, 3f), David Quinn 2-0, Peter Gallagher 0-1 (f), Ronan Commons 0-1, Andrew Quinn 0-1, Adam Gallagher 0-1 (f)	Referee: Frank Flynn (Aghamore)

==== Round 3 ====
6 September 2026 Round 3	Crossmolina Deel Rovers	0-16 (16) – (16) 2-10	Mayo Gaels	Charlestown
13:00 IST (UTC+1)		(HT: 0-11 – 1-05)		Venue: Fr O'Hara Park
	Pts: Cathal Carolan 0-4 (1tp), Kobe McDonald 0-3 (1f, 1'45), Diarmuid Walsh 0-3, James Maheady 0-1, Diarmuid Coggins 0-1, Conor Loftus 0-1, Niall Coggins 0-1, Oisín Deane 0-1, Jordan Flynn 0-1	Report	Pts: Andrew Quinn 1-2, John Gallagher 0-4 (1tp), David Quinn 1-0, Ethan Henry 0-2 (tp), Ruairí Keane 0-1, Adam Gallagher 0-1	Referee: Paul Lydon (Kiltimagh)

6 September 2026 Round 3	Ballintubber	1-12 (15) – (19) 2-13	Aghamore	Claremorris
13:00 IST (UTC+1)		(HT: 1-08 – 0-06)		Venue: Claremorris GAA
	Pts: Ciarán Gavin 1-5 (1tpf, 2f), Stephen O'Malley 0-2, Jason Gibbons 0-2, Cillian O'Connor 0-1 (m), Diarmuid O'Connor 0-1 ('45), Michael Plunkett 0-1	Report	Pts: Fergal Boland 0-5, Tom O'Flaherty 0-5 (1f), Jack O'Connor 1-0, Seán Óg Tigue 1-0, Liam Lavin 0-2 (tpf), Ross Egan 0-1	Referee: Kevin Connelly (Hollymount Carramore)

=== Group 4 ===
Advance to knockout stage Advance to relegation play-off

Team	Matches				Score			Pts
Team	Pld	W	D	L	For	Against	Diff	Pts
Breaffy	3	3	0	0	59	40	+19	6
Belmullet	3	2	0	1	55	46	+9	4
Knockmore	3	1	0	2	56	49	+7	2
Ballaghaderreen	3	0	0	3	43	78	-35	0

==== Round 1 ====
7 August 2026 Round 1	Knockmore	1-09 (12) – (15) 2-09	Belmullet	Knockmore
19:00 IST (UTC+1)		(HT: 0-05 – 0-01)
	Pts: Connell Dempsey 0-5 (2tpf), Aiden Orme 1-1 (1f), Adam Naughton 0-1, Pearse Ruttledge 0-1, Peter Naughton 0-1	Report	Pts: Fionn O'Donoghue 1-1 (1pen), Ryan O'Donoghue 0-4 (1tp, 1tpf), Eamon McAndrew 1-0, Anthony Barrett 0-2 (tp), Shane Nallen 0-2 (2'45)	Referee: Shane Corcoran (Islandeady)

9 August 2026 Round 1	Breaffy	0-22 (22) – (12) 0-12	Ballaghaderreen	Breaffy
14:00 IST (UTC+1)		(HT: 0-11 – 0-07)
	Pts: Jack Livingstone 0-6, Aidan O'Shea 0-4, Aidan Cunningham 0-3, Conor O'Shea 0-3, Daire Morrin 0-2, Matthew Ruane 0-1, Niall Carter 0-1, Pierce Deane 0-1, Joe Mellett 0-1	Report	Pts: Kuba Callaghan 0-5, David McBrien 0-2, Conor Moriarty 0-2, Callum Coleman 0-1, Matthew Connor 0-1, Ryan Lynch 0-1	Referee: Liam Devenney (Ballina Stephenites)

==== Round 2 ====
22 August 2026 Round 2	Ballaghaderreen	1-09 (12) – (27) 1-24	Knockmore	Ballaghaderreen
18:30 IST (UTC+1)		(HT: 0-03 – 1-11)
	Pts: Kuba Callaghan 1-3 (1tpf), Ryan Lynch 0-2 (tp), Luke O'Grady 0-2 (tp), Aaron Duffy 0-1, Arainn McDermott 0-1	Report	Pts: Peter Naughton 0-7 (4f), Connell Dempsey 0-6 (2tp), Aidan Orme 0-4, Caolan Hopkins 0-4 (1f), Adam Naughton 1-0, Ollie Armstrong 0-1, Pearse Ruttledge 0-1, Kieran King 0-1	Referee: Jerome Henry (Castlebar Mitchels)

23 August 2026 Round 2	Belmullet	1-08 (11) – (15) 0-15	Breaffy	Belmullet
13:00 IST (UTC+1)		(HT: 1-05 – 0-05)
	Pts: Ryan O'Donoghue 0-4 (1tpf, 1tp), Anthony Barrett 1-1, Fionn O'Donoghue 0-2, Eamon McAndrew 0-1	Report	Pts: Joe Mellett 0-3 (3f), Pierce Deane 0-3 (1tp, 1f), Jack Livingstone 0-2 (tpf), Aidan Cunningham 0-2, Robbie Fadden 0-1, Daire Morrin 0-1, Yousif Coghil 0-1, Aidan O'Shea 0-1, Conor O'Shea 0-1	Referee: John Glavey (Aghamore)

==== Round 3 ====
6 September 2026 Round 3	Belmullet	4-17 (29) – (19) 2-13	Ballaghaderreen	Ballina
15:30 IST (UTC+1)				Venue: James Stephens Park
	Pts: Ryan O'Donoghue 2-8, Rian Concannon 1-1, Darragh Dixon 1-0, James Lavelle 0-3, Fionn O'Donoghue 0-2, Shane Nallen 0-1, Anthony Barrett 0-1, Dara MacPaidin 0-1	Report	Pts: Arainn McDermott 0-9, David McBrien 1-1, Conor Moriarty 1-0, Ryan Lynch 0-2, Seán Buckley 0-1	Referee: Shane Corcoran (Islandeady)

6 September 2026 Round 3	Breaffy	0-22 (22) – (17) 1-14	Knockmore	Kiltimagh
15:30 IST (UTC+1)		(HT: 0-12 – 0-08)		Venue: Gilmartin Park
	Pts: Joe Mellett 0-7 (1tp, 5f), Matthew Ruane 0-4 (2tp), Jack Livingstone 0-4 (2tpf), Aidan O'Shea) 0-3 (1tp), Conor O;Shea 0-3 (1f), Yousif Coghill 0-1	Report	Pts: Peter Naughton 1-2, Aidan Orme 0-4 (1f), Conall Dempsey 0-3 (1tpf), Pearse Ruttledge 0-2 (tp), Caolan Hopkins 0-2, Ollie Armstrong 0-1	Referee: James Regan (Hollymount Carramore)

== Relegation Playoff ==
The bottom placed teams in each group will play each other in relegation semi-finals, the losers of which will play each other in a relegation final to see who will retain their senior status

=== Relegation Semi-Finals ===
18 September 2026 Relegation Semi-Final	Mayo Gaels	0-15 (15) – (11) 0-11	Balla	Hollymount
20:00 IST (UTC+1)		(HT: 0-04 – 0-09)		Venue: Flanagan Park
	Pts: Peter Gallagher 0-5 (3f), John Gallagher 0-3 (2f), Ronan Commons 0-2, David Quinn 0-2, Liam Hughes 0-1, Jack Fallon 0-1, Adam Gallagher 0-1	Report	Pts: Oisín Cronin 0-3, Gary McHale 0-2 (2f), Cillian Golding 0-2 (tp), Colm Murphy 0-1, Brian O'Donovan 0-1, Liam Glynn 0-1 (f), David Dolan 0-1 ('45)	Referee: Kevin Connelly (Hollymount Carramore)

19 September 2026 Relegation Semi-Final	Charlestown Sarsfields	5-10 (25) – (15) 1-12	Ballaghaderreen	Kiltimagh
16:00 IST (UTC+1)		(HT: 4-06 – 1-05)		Venue: Gilmartin Park
	Pts: Paul Towey 3-7, Matthew Lenehan 1-1, Conor McArdle 1-0, Ben Crean 0-1, Ruairí Cullen 0-1	Report	Pts: Kuba Callaghan 0-8, David McBrien 1-0, David Drake 0-2, Ryan Lynch 0-1, Arainn McDermott 0-1	Referee: Ronan Gurren (Aghamore)

=== Relegation Final ===
27 September 2026 Relegation Final	Balla	0-14 (14) – (16) 1-13	Ballaghaderreen	Ballyhaunis
12:00 IST (UTC+1)		(HT: 0-06 – 0-06)		Venue: Knock Road
		Report		Referee: James Regan (Hollymount Carramore)

== Knockout Stage ==
The top team in each group is drawn against a 2nd placed team from each group (no repeat pairings) in the quarter-finals. The winners of the quarter-finals are drawn against each other in the semi-finals, with the winners playing each other in the final.

=== Bracket ===
Quarter-finals
19 September, Aghamore
Aghamore	1-10
Castlebar Mitchels	0-19
20 September, Breaffy
Breaffy	2-18
Westport	0-18
19 September, Killeenrevagh
Garrymore	0-14
Crossmolina Deel Rovers	0-12
20 September, Claremorris
Claremorris	0-20
Belmullet	5-13

Semi-finals
3 October, Charlestown
Castlebar Mitchels	1-16
Breaffy	0-14
4 October, Ballina
Garrymore (AET)	2-16
Belmullet	2-15

Final
25 October, Castlebar
Castlebar Mitchels	1-17
Garrymore	0-12

=== Quarter-Finals ===
The draw for the quarter-finals was conducted on 6 September 2026.

19 September 2026 Quarter-Final	Aghamore	1-10 (13) – (19) 0-19	Castlebar Mitchels	Aghamore
16:30 IST (UTC+1)		(HT: 0-05 – 0-13)		Venue: Aghamore GAA Pitch
	Pts: Liam Lavin 0-4 (1tp), Conal Hession 1-0, Fergal Boland 0-3 (1tp), Cillian Mooney 0-1, Tom O'Flaherty 0-1, Jack O'Connor 0-1	Report	Pts: James Durcan 0-4 (1tp), Joe Forry 0-4 (1tpf), Paddy Durcan 0-3, Cian Walsh 0-3, Seán Morahan 0-1, Bob Tuohy 0-1, Eoghan Hughes 0-1, Rory Byrne 0-1 (f), Ultan O'Reilly 0-1	Referee: James Regan (Hollymount Carramore)

19 September 2026 Quarter-Final	Garrymore	0-14 (14) – (12) 0-12	Crossmolina Deel Rovers	Killeenrevagh
19:30 IST (UTC+1)		(HT: 0-07 – 0-07)
	Pts: Darren Quinn 0-5 (1tp, 2f), Andy Glennon 0-2 (tp), Shane Nally 0-2 (tp), Cathal Slattery 0-2, Mark Gibbons 0-2, Eoin McGreal 0-1	Report	Pts: Dylan Flynn 0-3 (1tp), Kobe McDonald 0-3 (2'45), Fionan Duffy 0-2 (2f), Niall Coggins 0-1, Diarmuid Coggins 0-1, James Maheady 0-1, Conor Loftus 0-1	Referee: Shane Corcoran (Islandeady)

20 September 2026 Quarter-Final	Breaffy	2-18 (24) – (18) 0-18	Westport	Breaffy
13:00 IST (UTC+1)		(HT: 1-10 – 0-12)
	Pts: Conor O'Shea 0-6 (1tp, 1f), Davitt Neary 0-4 (1tp), Gareth Dunne 1-1, Robbie Fadden 1-0 (pen), Aidan Cunningham 0-2 (tp), Darie Morrin 0-2 (tp), Joe Mellet 0-2 (1f), Aidan O'Shea 0-1	Report	Pts: Killian Kilkelly 0-7 (3f), Joe Grady 0-3 (1tp), Kevin Keane 0-3, Finbar McLaughlin 0-2 (tp), Rory Brickenden 0-1, Mark Moran 0-1, Jack O'Malley 0-1	Referee: Liam Devenney (Ballina Stephenites)

20 September 2026 Quarter-Final	Claremorris	0-20 (20) – (28) 5-13	Belmullet	Claremorris
15:30 IST (UTC+1)		(HT: 0-09 – 3-04)
	Pts: Niall Hurley 0-8 (1f), Darragh Beirne 0-6 (2tpf, 1f), Dara Hurley 0-3, Mark Maloney 0-2, David Hurley 0-1	Report	Pts: Ryan O'Donoghue 0-8 (2tpf, 2f), Fionn O'Donoghue 2-1, Anthony Barrett 1-2, Eamon McAmdrew 1-1, Seamus Howard 1-0, Shane Nallen 0-1 ('45)	Referee: Paul Lydon (Kiltimagh)

=== Semi-Finals ===
The draw for the semi-finals of the championship was made on 20 September 2026

3 October 2026 Semi-Final	Castlebar Mitchels	1-16 (19) – (14) 0-14	Breaffy	Charlestown
16:00 IST (UTC+1)		(HT: 1-11 – 0-07)		Venue: Fr O'Hara Park
	Pts: Joe Forry 1-5 (1tpf, 1f), Neil Douglas 0-5 (1tpf, 1f), Calum Filan 0-2, John MacMonagle 0-1, Bob Tuohy 0-1, Anthony O'Boyle 0-1, Cian Walsh 0-1	Report	Pts: Conor O'Shea 0-5 (2f), Matthew Ruane 0-2 (tp), Jack Livingstone 0-2 (tpf), Aidan Cunningham 0-1, Aidan O'Shea 0-1, Davitt Neary 0-1, Joe Mellett 0-1 (f), Tommy O'Reilly 0-1	Referee: John Glavey (Aghamore)

4 October 2026 Semi-Final	Garrymore	2-16 (22) – (21) 2-15 (a.e.t.)	Belmullet	Ballina
13:00 IST (UTC+1)		(HT: 0-08 – 0-09) (FT: 2-11 – 1-14)		Venue: James Stephens Park
	Pts: Mark Gibbons 1-3, Darren Quinn 0-4 (1tpf, 1f), Gary Golden 1-0, Trevor Nally 0-3 (1tp), Andy Glennon 0-2 (tp), Cathal Slattery 0-2, Enda Hession 0-1, Eoin McGreal 0-1	Report	Pts: Ryan O'Donoghue 0-8 (2tp, 3f), Fionn O'Donoghue 2-2, Shane Nallen 0-2 (tpf), Eoin O'Donoghue 0-2 (tp), Anthony Barrett 0-1	Referee: Frank Flynn (Aghamore)

=== Final ===
25 October 2026
15:30 IST (UTC+1)
Final

Report

Castlebar Mitchels	1-17 (20) – (12) 0-12	Garrymore
(HT: 0-09 – 0-04)
Pts: Bub Tuohy 0-6 (1tp), Cian Walsh 1-1 (pen), Joe Forry 0-4 (1f, 1tp), Paddy Durcan 0-2 (tp), Anthony O'Boyle 0-1, Seán Morahan 0-1, Ultan O'Reilly 0-1, Eoghan Hughes 0-1		Pts: Darren Quinn 0-4 (1tp), Trevor Nally 0-3 (1tp), Eoin McGreal 0-3 (1tp), Aaron Hughes 0-2 (tp)

MacHale Park, Castlebar
Referee: Liam Devenney (Ballina Stephenites)

Castlebar Mitchels	Garrymore
