= 2026 All-Ireland Senior Football Championship final =

Gaelic football match

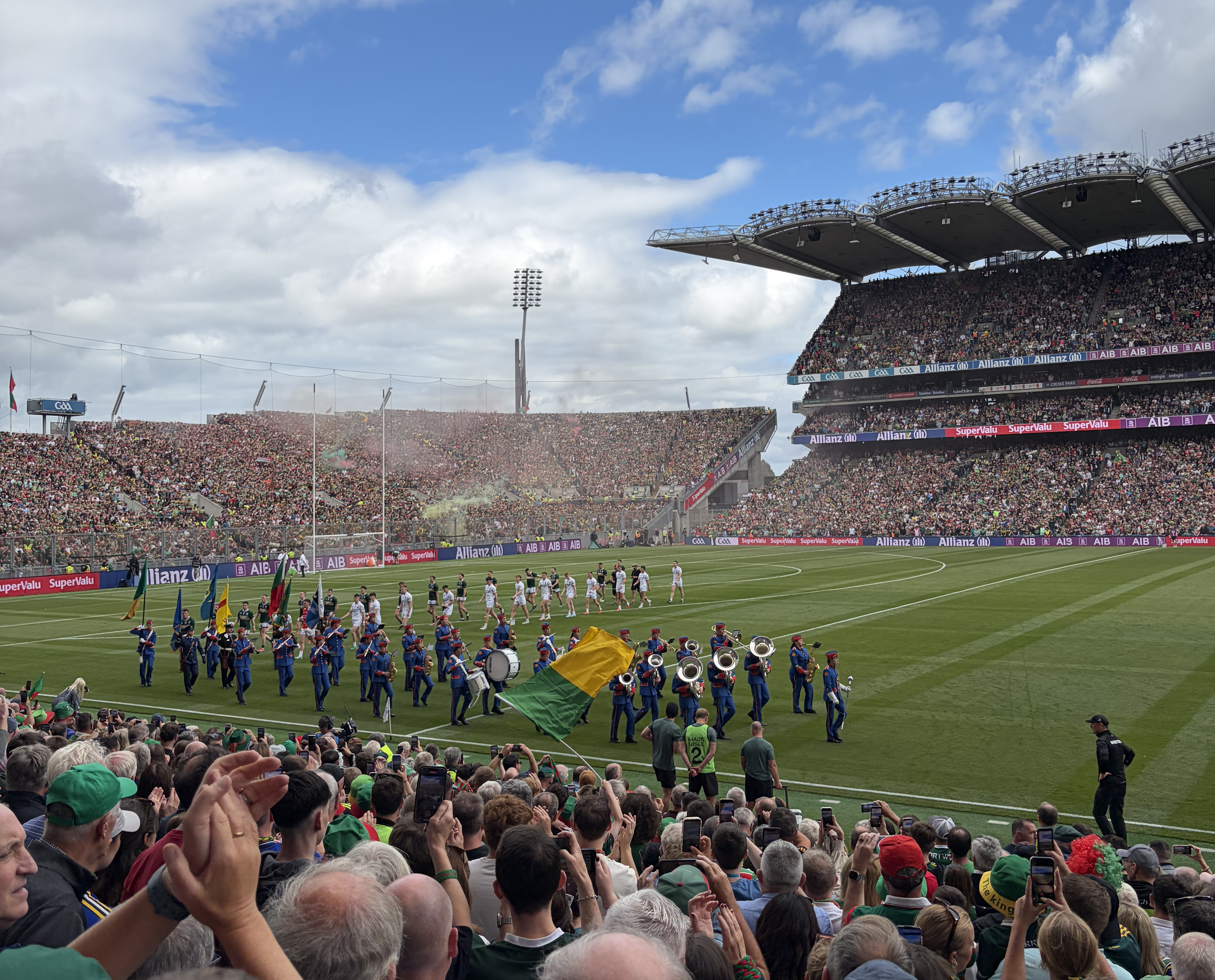
- Event: 2026 All-Ireland Senior Football Championship
Mayo	Kerry
1–20 (23)	1–17 (20)
- Date: 26 July 2026
- Venue: Croke Park, Dublin
- Man of the Match: Ryan O'Donoghue
- Referee: Martin McNally (Monaghan)
- Attendance: 82,300
- Weather: 19 °C (66 °F), cloudy, moderate breeze blowing into Cusack stand

The 2026 All-Ireland Senior Football Championship final was a Gaelic football match played at Croke Park in Dublin on 26 July 2026 between Kerry and Mayo, the culmination of the 2026 season. It was the 139th final of that sport's primary competition, the All-Ireland Senior Football Championship.

Kerry, the reigning title holder from 2025 and 2026 Munster Senior Football Championship winner, faced Mayo in what was a first meeting of the teams at this stage of the competition since 2006. Mayo defeated heavy favourites Kerry by a total of three points, with a score of 1–20 (23) to 1–17 (20) (see scoring notation). This was Mayo's first All-Ireland SFC title in 75 years, and a fourth overall.

The match was broadcast live on The Sunday Game Live on RTÉ2 television and on the RTÉ Player, presented by Joanne Cantwell with analysis from Peter Canavan, Tomás Ó Sé and Lee Keegan. Match commentary was provided by Marty Morrissey and Éamonn Fitzmaurice. It was also broadcast live by BBC Two Northern Ireland and on the BBC iPlayer.

The match drew an average TV audience of 944,000 viewers on RTÉ2, representing an 82% share of the available audience, and peaked at 1,100,000 towards the end of the game.

== Background ==
This was the fifth meeting of Mayo and Kerry in the All-Ireland SFC final, with Kerry being victorious in all four previous meetings, those of 1932, 1997, 2004 and 2006.

Kerry, the most successful county in the competition's history, entered the game with 39 previous titles. They had won 7 of the previous 22 editions of the tournament, including those of 2022 and 2025. Kerry were therefore strong favourites to win the title, with journalists describing it as a David and Goliath contest. Betting markets predicted Kerry to win by 4 points.

Mayo's previous title win was in 1951. Since then they had been runners-up 11 times, losing the finals of 1989, 1996, 1997, 2004, 2006, 2012, 2013, 2016, 2017, 2020 and 2021. Mayo's long losing streak gave rise to a legend that the team had been cursed after their 1951 title, supposedly because the celebrating team had passed a funeral procession without showing due respect. According to a version of that legend, the presiding priest placed a curse on the team which would prevent Mayo from winning the All-Ireland SFC title again until all the players involved in 1951 had passed away. The last surviving player from that game, Paddy Prendergast, died on 26 September 2021, shortly after Mayo lost that year's final. This left unused substitute Mike Loftus as the last surviving panel member from 1951; Loftus died at the age of 93 on 22 April 2023.

The last Sunday in July is Reek Sunday, when pilgrims traditionally climb Croagh Patrick, a mountain in County Mayo, and this was the first time that Mayo played an All-Ireland final on Reek Sunday as the All-Ireland SFC final was traditionally played in September until 2022. The unprecedented clash between these two cultural events was expected to affect attendances at both venues.

== Paths to the final ==
Kerry won the 2026 Munster Senior Football Championship final for the sixth year running. After a heavy defeat in Killarney to Donegal, Kerry then went on an unbeaten run to the final.

Mayo's 2026 Connacht Senior Football Championship campaign ended at the semi-final stage, with a loss to Roscommon, which also left Mayo more time than Kerry to prepare for the All-Ireland series. Nevertheless, they still lost one game, to 2021 All-Ireland SFC winners Tyrone.

Kerry
Round	Date	Opponent	Venue (H/A/N)	Result	Victory margin	Score	Ref
Munster SFC semi-final	25 April 2026	Clare	Cusack Park, Ennis (A)	Win	8	2–19 to 1–14	
Munster SFC final	10 May 2026	Cork	Fitzgerald Stadium (H)	Win	8	1–23 to 1–15	
Round 1	23 May 2026	Donegal	Fitzgerald Stadium (H)	Loss	–10	0–16 to 2–20	
Round 2B	13 June 2026	Kildare	St Conleth's Park (A)	Win	14	3–22 to 0–17	
Round 3	20 June 2026	Armagh	Fitzgerald Stadium (H)	Win	13	4–18 to 0–17	
Quarter-final	27 June 2026	Tyrone	Croke Park (N)	Win	4	2–25 to 0–27	
Semi-final	12 July 2026	Dublin	Croke Park (N)	Win	4	2–18 to 0–20	

Mayo
Round	Date	Opponent	Venue (H/A/N)	Result	Victory margin	Score	Ref
Connacht SFC quarter-final	11 April 2026	London	McGovern Park (A)	Win	13	0–31 to 1–15	
Connacht SFC semi-final	26 April 2026	Roscommon	McHale Park (H)	Loss	–10	1–18 to 2–25	
Round 1	31 May 2026	Monaghan	St Tiernach's Park (A)	Win	1	1–24 to 2–20	
Round 2A	14 June 2026	Tyrone	Healy Park (A)	Loss	–1	1–18 to 0–22	
Round 3	20 June 2026	Meath	McHale Park (H)	Win	3	0–22 to 2–13	
Quarter-final	27 June 2026	Cork	Croke Park (N)	Win	5	0–23 to 0–18	
Semi-final	11 July 2026	Louth	Croke Park (N)	Win	17	3–23 to 0–15	

== Pre-match ==
18-year-old Mayo forward Kobe McDonald had signed a pre-contract with St Kilda of the Australian Football League and was thus expected to be playing his last game for Mayo, with he and his family expected to move to Australia after Kobe finished his Leaving Certificate exams. Members of the Saints scouting staff were in attendance for the final, and McDonald wrote the phrase "One Chance" on his wrist tape as motivation.

As usual with Mayo attendance in an All Ireland the demand for tickets was off the charts and ratcheted up in the lead up to the match. In the build-up to the final, Belmullet super supporter John Shevlin attracted media attention after painting his house in Mayo's green and red colours. Shevlin was already known for driving a green-and-red Ford Focus bearing an "Up Mayo" message as his daily driver, which he had taken to Mayo's championship match against London in Ruislip earlier in the season.

=== Television ===
RTÉ2 broadcast the match live on The Sunday Game Live with coverage beginning at 2.15pm. The programme was presented by Joanne Cantwell who was joined by analysts Lee Keegan, Niall Morgan, Peter Canavan and Tomás Ó Sé. Commentary on the game was by Marty Morrissey and Éamonn Fitzmaurice.

The match was also broadcast live by BBC Two Northern Ireland with coverage beginning at 3pm. Sarah Mulkerrins presented the programme and was joined by Oisín McConville, Philly McMahon, Killian Young and Pádraig O'Hora for analysis. Match commentary was provided by Thomas Niblock along with Conor McManus.

RTÉ2's coverage was also simulcasted around the world via GAA+, the GAA's paid streaming service.

=== Officials ===
On 15 July the GAA announced that the referee for the Final would be Martin McNally of Monaghan. It was his first time reffing the All-Ireland final having been Standby Official for the 2025 final. His Line Umpires were Seán Hurson of Tyrone, who was the Standby Official, and Thomas Murphy of Galway. Seán Lonergan of Tipperary was the Sideline Official while Killian Jones (Kildare) was the Hawk-eye Official and Marty Duffy (Sligo) the Timekeeper.

=== Colours ===
Both counties' traditional colours required one county to wear a change strip; with both counties also having a predominantly blue clash jersey it was agreed that a coin toss would be used to decide who would wear their home kit and who would change. Kerry won the toss and wore their traditional green and gold kit. Kerry's 2026 kit is a darker shade of green than previous years and it was deemed to conflict with Mayo's navy alternative kit; as a result, Mayo wore a one-off all-white kit similar to what they wore when they last won the All-Ireland SFC title in 1951. The kit was based on a 75th anniversary tribute shirt Mayo had worn during their 2026 League campaign, except with their modern crest replacing a period-appropriate badge and the current sponsors Intersport Elverys printed on the front and Portwest printed on the back.

=== Team selection ===
On the Thursday before the final Kerry manager Jack O'Connor named the same starting 15 players that started the semi-final against Dublin, with captain Paul Geaney returning to the matchday squad on the bench.

Mayo named their team the following day with Andy Moran making one change to the starting line-up from their semi-final victory over Louth as Conor Loftus replaced Paul Towey.

Both sides had late injuries on the day of the game, with Mayo losing Stephen Coen (replaced by Diarmuid O'Connor). John MacMonagle took O'Connor's place on the bench. Mayo also started Paul Towey instead of Conor Loftus. Kerry replaced the injured Diarmuid O'Connor with Tom O'Sullivan, whose place on the bench went to Cillian Trant.

As Kerry captain Paul Geaney started on the bench, David Clifford was selected to act as captain on the field.

=== Sponsorship protest ===
David Hickey, a three-time All-Ireland SFC winner with Dublin, refused to attend the GPA's "Legends Lunch", a commemoration of the 50th anniversary of Dublin's 1976 championship-winning team. Hickey, along with others protested at Jones' Road prior to the game against the GAA's continued sponsorship relationship with Allianz, arguing that the GAA had failed to oppose the company's indirect links to Israel.

=== Jubilee team ===
Prior to the start of the match the Galway team of 2001 was presented to the crowd to mark the 25th anniversary of their All-Ireland title win over Meath. Their manager that day was John O'Mahony of Mayo. Galway's Paul Clancy, who had died the previous month (on 22 June), was represented by his son Finn.

== Match ==
Had the match finished level after the regulation 70 minutes, extra-time of 20 minutes (two 10-minute halves) were to have been played. Had the scores still been level after this, a replay was to take place on 8 August.

=== Summary ===
After 16 minutes, Kerry led by a scoreline of 1–5 to 0–1, David Clifford scored the goal for Kerry in the 15th minute when he received a pass on the right before cutting in and going past the Mayo goalkeeper before finishing to the net. David McBrien had got Mayo's solitary seventh-minute point. Mayo, who had led the All-Ireland series in two-point scores, found going tough early as they kicked towards Hill 16 in the first half with multiple efforts from beyond the arc dropping short. The momentum would eventually shift during the second quarter of the game as Mayo's pressure allowed them to win the ball from kick-outs and chip away at Kerry's advantage; Kerry led at half-time by a scoreline of 1–8 to 0–10, the pick of Mayo's scores the respective two-pointers of Ryan O'Donoghue and Jack Carney.

In the second half Mayo dominated possession and it was Kobe McDonald who put Mayo ahead for the first time, the score 0–12 to 1–8. In the 40th minute, Darragh Beirne scored a goal for Mayo following a well-worked passage of play to extend the advantage to four points. Jack Carney would later hit another two-pointer to give Mayo a five-point cushion, their biggest lead of the day. Mayo's shooting touch would run cold, though, with multiple wides opening the door for Kerry to mount a comeback. With three minutes to go, David and Paudie Clifford had succeeded in bringing Kerry to within two points, with the score at 1–19 to 1–17. Kerry had several chances to draw level late, including a missed two-pointer by Seán O'Shea, and with less than a minute Mayo took advantage of Kerry's aggressive offensive shape to gain possession and head on the break. Kobe McDonald elected not to take the ball to the corner and run out the clock but instead passed it off to Tommy Conroy, who would fist over an insurance score with practically no time left for Kerry to reply. Mayo won by a scoreline of 1–20 to 1–17.

Mayo substitute Rory Brickenden had to swap the number 18 jersey he was mistakenly wearing for the correct number 19 jersey in the 55th minute of the game. The number 18 jersey belonged to Paddy Durcan.

=== Details ===
RTÉ2
BBC Two NI

26 July 2026
15:30 IST (UTC+1)
Final

Report

Mayo	1–20 (23) – (20) 1–17	Kerry
(HT: 0–10 – 1–8)
Gls: D Beirne 1 Pts: R O'Donoghue 5 (2x2p, 1f), J Carney 4 (2x2p), K McDonald 3 (1 '45'), D Beirne 3 (2fs), T Conroy 2, D McBrien 1, J Flynn , S Callinan 1		Gls: D Clifford 1 Pts: D Clifford 6 (1x2p), P Clifford 3 (1 '45'), Seán O'Shea 3, J O'Connor 1, D Casey 1, G O'Sullivan 1, K Evans 1, T O'Sullivan 1

Croke Park, Dublin
Referee: Martin McNally (Monaghan)
Attendance: 82,300
Standby: Seán Hurson (Tyrone)
Linesman: Thomas Murphy (Galway)
Sideline: Seán Lonergan (Tipperary)
Umpires: Ben Woods, Niall Reilly, Mark Gilsenan and Anthony Marron (all Corduff Gaels)

Mayo	Kerry

GK	1	Jack Livingstone
FB	2	Jack Coyne (c)
FB	3	Donnacha McHugh
FB	4	Eoin McGreal		(substituted off) 53'
HB	5	Sam Callinan		(substituted off) 65'
HB	6	David McBrien
HB	7	Enda Hession
MF	8	Bob Tuohy		(substituted off) 53'
MF	9	Jack Carney
HF	24	Diarmuid O'Connor		(substituted off) 58'
HF	23	Paul Towey		(substituted off) 24'
HF	12	Jordan Flynn	(yellow card) 22'
FF	13	Darragh Beirne
FF	14	Ryan O'Donoghue
FF	15	Kobe McDonald
Substitutes:
	16	Rob Hennelly
	17	Fenton Kelly
	18	Paddy Durcan		(substituted on) 65'
	19	Rory Brickenden		(substituted on) 53'
	20	Conal Dawson
	21	Aidan O'Shea
	22	Matthew Ruane		(substituted on) 53'
	11	Conor Loftus		(substituted on) 58'
	10	John MacMonagle
	25	Tommy Conroy		(substituted on) 24'
	26	Cian McHale
Manager:
Andy Moran

GK	1	Shane Murphy
FB	2	Paul Murphy	(substituted off) 61'
FB	3	Jason Foley
FB	4	Dylan Casey	28' to 30'
HB	5	Graham O'Sullivan
HB	6	Mike Breen
HB	7	Gavin White	(substituted off) 59'
MF	8	Mark O'Shea
MF	9	Seán O'Brien	(substituted off) 63'
HF	10	Joe O'Connor
HF	11	Seán O'Shea
HF	25	Tom O'Sullivan	(substituted off) 36'
FF	13	Paudie Clifford
FF	14	David Clifford (c)
FF	15	Dylan Geaney	11' to 15'	(substituted off) 51'
Substitutes:
	16	Shane Ryan
	17	Evan Looney	28' to 30'	(substituted on) 61'
	18	Tomás Kennedy	(substituted on) 51'
	19	Keith Evans	11' to 15'	(substituted on) 36'
	20	Paul Geaney (c)
	21	Armin Heinrich
	22	Brian Ó Beaglaoich	(substituted on) 59'
	23	Tadhg Morley
	24	Micheál Burns	(substituted on) 63'
	12	Cillian Trant
	26	Killian Spillane
Manager:
Jack O'Connor

== Post-match ==
Mayo captain Jack Coyne accepted the Sam Maguire Cup from GAA president Jarlath Burns in the Hogan Stand. During his post-match speech, Coyne praised the past generations of players and coaches who carried Mayo's hopes without ever experiencing triumph themselves, along with supporters both in Mayo and the diaspora, adding: "The wait is over, Sam is home. Maigh Eo abú."

Kerry manager Jack O'Connor admitted that Mayo were the better team on the day. Speaking to RTÉ's The Sunday Game after full-time, he said: "Mayo stayed with us until half-time, their belief grew and I thought in the second half they were better than us."

=== Awards ===
During Mayo's banquet at the Hilton hotel, on the night of the game, GAA President Jarlath Burns presented the Man of the Match trophy to Ryan O'Donoghue, after RTÉ announced him as winner on The Sunday Game.

The TV programme also gave Ryan O'Donoghue its player of the season award. The Sunday Game named O'Donoghue and six others from Mayo on its Team of the Year, as well as four Kerry players and one each from Dublin, Louth, Westmeath and Tyrone.

=== Reaction ===
Marty Morrissey's call of the final seconds and aftermath on RTÉ:

"...Seventy-five years of heartbreak are about to end! 1936, 1950, 1951, and surely now, 2026! Listen to the roar! Seventy-five years of heartbreak is OVER!! Mayo are the All-Ireland Senior Football Champions 2026!"

Martin Carney, a former Mayo player who was commentating on the match for MidWest Radio, went viral in all the excitement, and responded by stating he was “embarrassed completely”, but that he had got “a big kiss” from a woman "blowing full on" in the middle of it all. The sounds emanating from Carney at full-time were described as being of the sort “that if you heard them in any other scenario, you'd be calling for an ambulance or a very experienced vet”

International media covered the ‘breaking’ of the curse. Shivam Pathak of ESPN noted Paddy Prendergast, Mayo's last surviving player from 1951, had died two weeks after the 2021 final, the last one contested by Mayo before 2026. Writing for ABC News (Australia), Andrew McGarry said that "this year was the first opportunity to win the biggest game of the season since the elements of the curse had been met."

Among the dignitaries to message the winning team were former United States President Joe Biden and sitting Canadian Prime Minister Mark Carney, both of whom are descended from Mayo emigrants. Reactions also came from the world of music including Noel Gallagher, Liam Gallagher and Paul "Bonehead" Arthurs from the band Oasis, whose mothers are Mayo natives, and from other sports including golf, association football and rugby union.

=== Celebrations ===
Tens of thousands attended a homecoming event at MacHale Park in Castlebar the day after the final, where the team arrived just after 6.15pm after travelling by train from Dublin having previously completed the now-traditional champions' visit to Crumlin Children's Hospital. The celebration in Castlebar kicked off a week-long trophy tour, with the team bus stopping for festivities in Ballyhaunis (hometown of captain Jack Coyne) as well as visits to the Ballina Stephenites, Belmullet, Ballaghaderreen and Claremorris clubs, the home clubs of Sam Callinan, Ryan O'Donoghue, Andy Moran, and Darragh Beirne respectively.

On 30 August at the Electric Picnic music festival, 13 Mayo players took to the main Stage during the Saw Doctors performance and joined in for a rendition of The Green and Red of Mayo.

On 28 November 2026, an exhibition rematch is scheduled to take place in London at the StoneX Stadium in Barnet.
