= 2020 All-Ireland Senior Football Championship final =

- Event: 2020 All-Ireland Senior Football Championship
| Dublin | Mayo |
| 2–14 (20) | 0–15 (15) |
- Date: 19 December 2020
- Venue: Croke Park, Dublin
- Man of the Match: Con O'Callaghan
- Referee: David Coldrick (Meath)
- Attendance: 0 (Note: The game was played behind closed doors due to the impact of the COVID-19 pandemic on Gaelic games.)

The 2020 All-Ireland Senior Football Championship final was a Gaelic football match played at Croke Park in Dublin on 19 December 2020 between Dublin and Mayo, the culmination of the 2020 All-Ireland Senior Football Championship. It was the 133rd final of that sport's primary competition, the All-Ireland Senior Football Championship.

Reigning All-Ireland SFC and Leinster champion Dublin took on Connacht champion Mayo, with Dublin bidding to become the first Gaelic Athletic Association (GAA) team to win six consecutive editions of the competition.

The game was televised nationally on RTÉ2 as part of The Saturday Game live programme, presented by Joanne Cantwell from the outdoor COVID-19 pandemic-proofed studio at Croke Park, with analysis from (positioned left to right onscreen) Tomás Ó Sé, Oisín McConville and Colm O'Rourke. Match commentary was provided by Ger Canning, assisted by Kevin McStay. The game was also televised internationally by Sky Sports. Des Cahill presented the highlights programme on RTÉ2 that night, with analysis from Pat Spillane, Seán Cavanagh, McStay and Ciarán Whelan.

== Background ==
This All-Ireland championship was delayed to the end of the year due to the impact of the COVID-19 pandemic on Gaelic games, with a straight knockout tournament for the first time since 2000.

- Dublin were aiming to complete an unprecedented six-in-a-row, having won the All-Ireland in 2015, 2016, 2017, 2018 and 2019.
- Mayo were aiming to win their first All-Ireland since 1951. Since then, they had lost nine finals in a row (1989, 1996, 1997, 2004, 2006, 2012, 2013, 2016, 2017).
- This was the first final to take place in December since 1917. It is the latest in a year that the final has taken place (on several years up until 1926, the final was delayed to the year after it was supposed to take place).
- Both the Taoiseach and President of Ireland were absent, another first.
- The fifth meeting of Dublin and Mayo in the All-Ireland Senior Football Championship Final. The previous meetings were in 1921, 2013, 2016 and 2017: Dublin won all four.
- 15 Dublin players had the opportunity to equal Jack Lynch's six consecutive All-Ireland medals (hurling 1941–44, football 1945, hurling 1946).

== Paths to the final ==
=== Dublin ===
| 7 November 2020 Leinster Quarter-Final | Westmeath | 0–11 (11) – (22) 0–22 | Dublin | Portlaoise |
| 18:15 GMT (UTC+0) | | (HT: 0-06 – 0–15) | | Venue: O'Moore Park |
| | Pts: J Heslin 3, R Connellan 2, K Martin 2, L Loughlin 2, R O’Toole 1, J Smith 1. | Report | Pts: D Rock 6, C Kilkenny 5, P Small 3, S Bugler 2, C O’Callaghan 1, J McCarthy 1, N Scully 1, J Cooper 1, E Murchan 1, R McDaid 1 | Referee: Martin McNally (Monaghan); Attendance: 0 TV: Sky Sports Mix |

| 15 November 2020 Leinster Semi-final | Laois | 0–07 (7) – (29) 2–23 | Dublin | Dublin |
| 15:30 GMT (UTC+0) | | | | Venue: Croke Park |
| | Pts: P Kingston 2, G Walsh 2 (1f), E O’Carroll 1 (m), R Munnelly 1, Byrne 1. | Report | Gls: C Kilkenny 1, S Bugler 1. Pts: C Costello 7 (3f, 1m, 1 ‘45), C Kilkenny 4, B Fenton 4, N Scully 3, D Rock 2 (1’45, 1f), R McDaid 1, P Small 1, C O’Callaghan 1. | Referee: Ciaran Branagan (Down); Attendance: 0 TV: RTÉ News Now |

| 21 November 2020 Leinster Final | Meath | 0–09 (9) – (30) 3–21 | Dublin | Dublin |
| 19:00 GMT (UTC+0) | | (HT: 0-02 – 2–12) | | Venue: Croke Park |
| | Pts: J Morris 4 (1f); B Menton 1, C O'Sullivan 1, J Scully 1; T O'Reilly 1 (f); J Wallace 1 (m). | Report | Gls: D Rock 1, S Bugler 1, N Scully 1. Pts: D Rock 7 (5f, 1 '45'); C Kilkenny 4; P Small 3 (2m); C O'Callaghan 2; S Bugler 2, J Small 1; P Mannion 1 (f), N Scully 1. | Referee: Derek O'Mahoney (Tipperary); Attendance: 0 TV: RTÉ |

| 5 December 2020 All-Ireland Semi-final | Dublin | 1–24 (27) – (12) 0–12 | Cavan | Dublin |
| 17:30 GMT (UTC+0) | | (HT: 0-12 – 0-07) | | Venue: Croke Park |
| | Gls: R McDaid 1 Pts: D Rock 6 (2f); C Kilkenny 4 (1m), C O’Callaghan 4, B Fenton 4; R McDaid 2, P Small 2 (1f); B Howard 1, C Costello 1. | Report | Pts: M Reilly 3; O Kiernan 2; J Smith 1, R Galligan 1, C Brady 1, G McKiernan 1 (f), C Conroy 1 (f), C Madden 1, J Smith 1. | Referee: Ciaran Branagan (Down); Attendance: 0 TV: RTÉ; Sky Sports |

=== Mayo ===
| 1 November 2020 Connacht Quarter-Final | Leitrim | 0–10 (10) – (21) 2–15 | Mayo | Carrick-on-Shannon |
| 13:15 GMT (UTC+0) | | (HT: 0-06 – 1-06) | | Venue: Páirc Seán Mac Diarmada |
| | Pts: K Beirne 5 (5f), C Dolan 1, S Quinn 1, E Sweeney 1, D Flynn 1, D Casey 1. | Report | Gls: C O'Connor 1, T Conroy 1. Pts: C O’Connor 9 (4f, 2 ’45), A O’Shea 2, B Walsh 1, M Runae 1, J Carr 1, C Loftus 1. | Referee: Paul Faloon (Down); Attendance: 0 TV: RTÉ News Now |

| 8 November 2020 Connacht Semi-final | Roscommon | 0–13 (13) – (19) 1–16 | Mayo | Roscommon |
| 13:30 GMT (UTC±0) | | (HT: 0-05 – 1-08) | | Venue: Dr. Hyde Park |
| | Pts: C Cox 2 (1m, 1f), C McKeon 2 (2f), D Smith 3 (1f); D Murtagh 2; N Daly 1, T O'Rourke 1. | Report | Gls: D O’Connor 1 Pts: C O'Connor 9 (6f); P Durcan 2; A O'Shea 1, T Conroy 1, K McLoughlin 1, C Loftus 1, D O'Connor 1. | Referee: David Gough (Meath); Attendance: 0 TV: RTÉ |

| 15 November 2020 Connacht Final | Galway | 0–13 (13) – (14) 0–14 | Mayo | Galway |
| 13:30 GMT (UTC+0) | | (HT: 0-05 - 0-08) | | Venue: Pearse Stadium |
| | Pts: S Walsh 7 (4f), P Conroy 3, D Conneely 1, P Kelly 1, G O’Donnell 1. | Report | Pts: C O’Connor 4 (2f), T Conroy 3, M Ruane 2, B Walsh 2, P Durcan 1, D O’Connor 1, R O’Donoghue 1. | Referee: Sean Hurson (Tyrone); Attendance: 0 TV: RTÉ |

| 6 December 2020 All-Ireland Semi-final | Mayo | 5–20 (35) – (22) 3–13 | Tipperary | Dublin |
| 15:30 GMT (UTC+0) | | (HT: 4–12 – 1-05) | | Venue: Croke Park |
| | Gls: C O'Connor 4, D O'Connor 1. Pts: C O’Connor 9 (6fs); T Conroy 4 (1m); D Coen 2; M Ruane 1, P Durcan 1, K McLoughlin 1, A O’Shea 1, C Loftus 1. | Report | Gls: C Sweeney 1, B Fox 1, P Feehan 1. Pts: C Sweeney 9 (8fs); C O’Riordan 2; S O’Brien 1, K Fahey 1. | Referee: David Gough ((Meath); Attendance: 0 TV: RTÉ; Sky Sports |

== Pre-match ==
The Chicago Federation of Labor displayed the words "Mayo for Sam" in lights on the 41-storey Prudential Building ahead of the game. Dublin Castle was also lit up in the Mayo colours ahead of the game.

Traditionally, the final of the All-Ireland Minor Football Championship takes place before the senior game. However, due to the pandemic, that competition was still in its preliminary stages as December arrived. Instead, the final of the 2020 All-Ireland Under-20 Football Championship, contested by Dublin and Galway and originally due to have been played in October before a further suspension of play occurred for underage teams, is scheduled to take place before the senior decider.

The official matchday programme was made available in physical form for supporters ahead of the game, either online (via an emailed PDF and follow-up copy send through the postal system) or to purchase at SuperValu and Centra outlets in Dublin and Mayo.

== Match ==
=== Summary ===
Dean Rock obtained the record for the fastest goal scored in the history of All-Ireland SFC finals, after sending the ball past David Clarke directly from the throw-in of the 2020 final, breaking Kerryman Garry McMahon's record which had stood since the 1962 final.

This was the second consecutive All-Ireland SFC final half throw-in that Dublin scored a goal from, following Eoin Murchan's goal straight from the second half throw-in of the 2019 replay.

With this victory, six Dublin players joined the five Kerrymen (Ogie Moran, Páidí Ó Sé, Ger Power, Mikey Sheehy and Pat Spillane) on a record eight All-Ireland SFC medals. These were Stephen Cluxton, Michael Fitzsimons, James McCarthy, Philly McMahon, Kevin McManamon and Cian O'Sullivan. Ballymun Kickhams joined Austin Stacks club in having two such players. Only Ó Sé is deceased, so ten of the eleven were alive in tandem.

=== Details ===
RTÉ
Sky Sports

19 December 2020
17:00 GMT (UTC+0)
Final

Report

| Dublin | 2–14 (20) – (15) 0–15 | Mayo |
|---|---|---|
(HT: 2–6 – 0–10)
| Gls: D Rock 1, C O'Callaghan 1. Pts: D Rock 4 (fs); C Kilkenny 3; C O'Callaghan 1, S Bugler 1, P Small 1, N Scully 1, B Fenton 1, P Mannion 1 (f), B Howard 1. | | Pts: C O'Connor 9 (5fs, 2ms); R O'Donoghue 2; O Mullen 1, C Loftus 1, S Coen 1 (m), D Coen 1. |

Croke Park, Dublin
Referee: David Coldrick (Meath)
Attendance: 0

| Dublin | Mayo |

Dublin =

- 1 S. Cluxton (c)
- 2 M. Fitzsimons
- 3 D. Byrne
- 4 J. Cooper
- 5 E. Murchan
- 6 J. Small
- 7 R. McDaid
- 8 B. Fenton
- 9 J. McCarthy
- 10 N. Scully
- 11 C. Kilkenny
- 12 S. Bugler
- 13 P. Small
- 14 C. O'Callaghan
- 15 D. Rock

Subs used
20 B. Howard for S. Bugler
24 P. Mannion for P. Small
17 C. Basquel for J. Cooper
19 C. Costello for N. Scully
25 P. McMahon for E. Murchan

Subs not used
16 E. Comerford
18 A. Byrne
21 T. Lahiff
22 E. Lowndes
23 M. D. MacAuley
26 K. McManamon

Manager
D. Farrell

Mayo =

- 1 D. Clarke
- 2 C. Barrett
- 3 O. Mullin
- 4 L. Keegan
- 5 P. Durcan
- 6 S. Coen
- 7 E. McLaughlin
- 8 C. Loftus
- 9 M. Ruane
- 10 K. McLoughlin
- 11 R. O'Donoghue
- 12 D. O'Connor
- 13 T. Conroy
- 14 A. O'Shea (c)
- 15 C. O'Connor

Subs used
18 M. Plunkett for P. Durcan
25 J. Carr for T. Conroy
26 D. Coen for R. O'Donoghue
22 J. Flynn for C. Loftus
24 J. Durcan for E. McLaughlin

Subs not used
16 R. Hennelly
17 P. O'Hora
19 R. Brickenden
20 K. Higgins
21 T. Parsons
23 F. Boland

Manager
J. Horan

== Post-match ==
The Sam Maguire Cup was withheld over concerns about the possibility of "crowds gathering".

A statement which the Mayo County Board issued on 8 January (and which the media reported on several days later) confirmed that three members of the Mayo backroom team had each been suspended for three months after attending the 2020 All-Ireland Senior Football Championship Final "without accreditation". They sneaked into the stadium by hitching a ride in the team's kit van.
