= 2017 Mayo Senior Football Championship =

Gaelic Football tournament

Tournament details
- County: Mayo
- Year: 2017
- Trophy: Paddy Moclair Cup
- Sponsor: Treanlaur Catering
- Date: 6 May - 22 October 2018
- Teams: 16
- Defending champions: Castlebar Mitchels

Winners
- Champions: Castlebar Mitchels (31st win)
- Manager: Declan Shaw & Declan O'Reilly
- Captain: Rory Byrne
- Qualify for: Connacht Club SFC

Runners-up
- Runners-up: Ballintubber
- Manager: Tom Prendergast

Promotion/Relegation
- Relegated team(s): Ballinrobe

Other
- Matches played: 37 (including replays)
- Player of the Year: Ger McDonagh
- Top Scorer: Cillian O'Connor

The 2017 Mayo Senior Football Championship was the 116th edition of the Mayo GAA's premier Gaelic football tournament for senior clubs in County Mayo, Ireland. Sixteen teams competed with the winner representing Mayo in the Connacht Senior Club Football Championship. The championship started with a group stage and progressed to a knock out stage. The winners received the Paddy Moclair Cup.

Castlebar Mitchels were the defending champions after they defeated Knockmore in the 2016 final. They successfully defended their title to claim a "3-in-a-row" and their 31st title overall when they defeated Ballintubber on a scoreline of 0–15 to 0–13 in McHale Park on 22 October 2017.

The year saw Westport's return to the senior grade after just two seasons outside of the top-flight following relegation in 2014. In March 2017, they claimed the All-Ireland Intermediate Club Football Championship title, defeating Meath champions St Colmcille's in the final.

== Clubs ==
The 2017 Championship was contested by 16 clubs: 5 from South Mayo, 4 from North Mayo, 4 from West Mayo, 3 from East Mayo.

Team	Team colours	Position in 2016
Aghamore		Quarter-finalists
Ballaghaderreen		Quarter-finalists
Ballina Stephenites		Group Stage
Ballinrobe		Relegation Final
Ballintubber		Semi-Finalists
Breaffy		Semi-Finalists
Castlebar Mitchels		champions
Charlestown Sarsfields		Group Stage
Claremorris		Relegation Semi-Final
Crossmolina Deel Rovers		Quarter-finalists
Davitts		Group Stage
Garrymore		Quarter-finalists
Hollymount-Carramore		Relegation Semi-Final
Kiltane		Group Stage
Knockmore		Finalists
Westport		Intermediate Champions

== Group stage ==
All 16 teams entered the competition at this stage. The top 2 teams in each group progressed to the quarter-finals while the bottom team of each group entered a Relegation Playoff. All teams played one home match, one away match and one match at a neutral venue. In the event of two teams finishing on the same points total, placings were decided by head-to-head record between the teams, then by scoring difference.

=== Group 1 ===
Team	Pld	W	L	D	PF	PA	PD	Pts
Knockmore	3	2	0	1	57	41	+16	5
Garrymore	3	1	1	1	48	57	-9	3
Charlestown Sarsfields	3	1	1	1	54	49	+5	3
Westport	3	0	2	1	36	48	-12	1

Round 1

6 May 2017
17:00
Round 1

Charlestown	2-10 (16) – (16) 2-10	Knockmore
(HT: 2-07 – 1-04)
Gls: N. Murphy 2 Pts: J. Reilly 5 (3f), N. Murphy 1, T. Parsons 1, G. O'Donnell 1, R. Duffy 1, T. Meehan 1		Gls: P. Naughton 1, K. McLoughlin 1 Pts: P. Naughton 5 (4f), D. McHale 2, K. Ruttledge 2, K. McLoughlin 1

Fr. O'Hara Memorial Park, Charlestown
Referee: E. McAndrew (Claremorris)

6 May 2017
19:00
Round 1

Garrymore	2-07 (13) – (13) 1-10	Westport
(HT: 1-04 – 1-02)
Gls: M. Tierney 1, D. Quinn 1 Pts: T. Nally 2, N. Monaghan 1, B. Cunningham 1, C. Crowe 1, J. Kileen 1 (f), M. Tierney 1,		Gls: C. Moran 1 Pts: A. Kennedy 6 (4f), C. Moran 1, D. Horan 1, S. Scott 1, R. Geraghty 1

Garrymore, Garrymore
Referee: L. Devenney (Ballina Stephenites)

Round 2

17 June 2017
19:30
Round 2

Westport	0-11 (11) – (18) 3-09	Charlestown
(HT: 0-06 – 0-05)
Pts: S. Scott 3 (1f), C. Moran 2, P. Lambert 2, A. Kennedy 2 (2f), P. Keegan 1, D. Horan 1		Gls: N. Murphy 2, J. Reilly 1 Pts: J. Reilly 3 (2f), C. Maye 2 (1f, 1'45), N. Murphy 1, A. Woods 1, T. Meehan 1, J. McBrien 1

St. Patrick's Park, Westport
Referee: K. Connelly (Hollymount Carramore)

17 June 2017
17:30
Round 2

Knockmore	2-18 (24) – (13) 1-10	Garrymore
(HT: 1-09 – 1-04)
Gls: D. McHale 1, S. Ruttledge 1 Pts: P. Naughton 7 (4f), D. McHale 3, K. McLoughlin 3, K. Ruttledge 2, B. Gibbons 2, C. Reape 1		Gls: C. Crowe 1 Pts: J. Killeen 4 (3f), S. Nally 2, M. Tierney 2 (1f, 1'45), B. Cunningham 1, M. Fallon 1

St. Joseph's Park, Knockmore
Referee: R. Gurren (Aghamore)

Round 3

30 September 2017
17:00
Round 3

Garrymore	2-16 (22) – (20) 1-17	Charlestown
(HT: 1-08 – 0-07)
Gls: T. Nally 1, M. Tierney 1 Pts: M. Tierney 4 (1f), J. Killeen 4 (2f), C. Crowe 2, C. Slattery 2, M. Connolly 2 (1f), P. Hession 1, S. Nally 1		Gls: N. Murphy 1 Pts: J. Reilly 9 (5f), C. Maye 2 (2f), G. O'Donnell 2, T. Meehan 1, J. McBrien 1, T. Parsons 1, D. McMeel 1

Connacht GAA Centre of Excellence, Bekan
Referee: D. Corcoran (Islandeady)

30 September 2017
17:00
Round 3

Knockmore	2-11 (17) – (12) 1-09	Westport
(HT: 2-06 – 1-04)
Gls: T. Clarke 1, S. Ruttledge 1 Pts: P. Naughton 6 (3f), K. Ruttledge 2, B. Gibbons 1, N. Hardy 1, K. McLoughlin 1		Gls: C. Moran 1 Pts: K. Kilkelly 7 (6f), C. Moran 1, B. McDermott 1

MacHale Park, Castlebar
Referee: J. Glavey (Aghamore)

=== Group 2 ===
Team	Pld	W	L	D	PF	PA	PD	Pts
Breaffy	3	3	0	0	77	34	+43	6
Hollymount-Carramore	3	2	1	0	57	37	+20	4
Ballaghaderreen	3	1	2	0	41	78	-37	2
Davitts	3	0	3	0	41	67	-26	0

Round 1

6 May 2017
19:00
Round 1

Ballaghaderreen	1-06 (9) – (27) 4-15	Hollymount Carramore
(HT: 1-03 – 1-09)
Gls: R. Lynch 1 Pts: B. Regan 2 (1f), P. Kelly 1, M. Tyrell 1, A. Moran 1, T. Carmody 1		Gls: K. Feerick 2 (1 pen), C. Keane 1, P. Feerick 1 Pts: K. Feerick 6 (4f), C. Keane 4 (1f, 1 '45), D. Feerick 3, D. Costello 1, P. Feerick 1

Ballaghaderreen, Ballaghaderreen
Referee: V. Neary (Bonniconlon)

6 May 2017
19:30
Round 1

Breaffy	4-18 (30) – (9) 0-09	Davitts
(HT: 2-08 – 0-03)
Gls: C. O'Shea 1, J. Minogue 1, G. Dunne 1, A. O'Shea 1 Pts: C. O'Shea 8 (7f), L. Irwin 3 (1f), J. Minogue 2 (2f), G. Dunne 1, D. Morrin 1, S. O'Shea 1, E. Conroy 1, E. Morrin 1		Pts: C. Hennelly 5 (4f), R. McNamara 2, S. Treacy 1, E. Ronane 1

Breaffy, Breaffy
Referee: R. Gurren (Aghamore)

Round 2

17 June 2017
17:00
Round 2

Hollymount Carramore	1-10 (13) – (15) 3-06	Breaffy
(HT: 0-05 – 0-05)
Gls: N. Moran 1 Pts: D. Coen 4 (2f), I. Costello 2, K. Feerick 2 (1f), P. Feerick 1, C. Keane 1 ('45)		Gls: L. Irwin 1 (pen), E. Morrin 1, R. Martyn 1 Pts: L. Irwin 3 (2f), E. Morrin 1, T. O'Reilly 1, G. Dunne 1

Carramore, Carramore
Referee: J. Glavey (Aghamore)

17 June 2017
19:00
Round 2

Davitts	2-13 (19) – (20) 3-11	Ballaghaderreen
(HT: 0-05 – 2-04)
Gls: R. McNamara 1, J. Ronayne 1 Pts: C. Hennelly 5 (3f), L. Kearns 5 (4f), M. Conroy 2, R. McNamara 1 (f)		Gls: A. Moran 2, B. Regan 1 Pts: B. Regan 4 (2f), S. Akram 2, G. Conway 2, A. Moran 1, D. Kelly 1, B. Solan 1

Ballindine, Ballindine
Referee: C. Collins (Lacken)

Round 3

30 September 2017
18:30
Round 3

Breaffy	6-14 (32) – (12) 1-09	Ballaghaderreen
(HT: 3-10 – 1-03)
Gls: C. O'Shea 2, R. Martyn 1, G. Walsh 1, E. Morrin 1, R. Fadden 1 Pts: T. O'Reilly 3, C. O'Shea 2 (1f), G. Jennings 2, R. Hennelly 2 (2 '45), D. Cannon 1, E. Morrin 1, J. Minogue 1, S. O'Shea 1, L. Irwin 1 (f)		Gls: O. Jordan 1 Pts: O. Jordan 3, K. O'Donnell 1, B. Regan 1, P. Kelly 1, D. Drake 1, S. McHugh 1, S. Akram 1 ('45)

Connacht GAA Centre of Excellence, Bekan
Referee: C. Collins (Lacken)

30 September 2017
18:30
Round 3

Hollymount Carramore	2-11 (17) – (13) 1-10	Davitts
(HT: 2-05 – 1-03)
Gls: D. Coen 1, K. Feerick 1 Pts: D. Coen 4 (2f), K. Feerick 2, C. Keane 1, N. Moran 1, E. Moloney 1, S. Coen 1, C. Connolly 1		Gls: C. Boyle 1 Pts: J. Ronayne 6 (3f), L. Kearns 1 (f), R. McNamara 1, E. Ronane 1, M. Conroy 1

Connacht GAA Centre of Excellence, Bekan
Referee: R. Gurren (Aghamore)

=== Group 3 ===
Team	Pld	W	L	D	PF	PA	PD	Pts
Ballintubber	3	3	0	0	55	31	+24	6
Claremorris	3	1	1	1	46	47	-1	3
Kiltane	3	1	2	0	36	49	-13	2
Aghamore	3	0	2	1	46	56	-10	1

Round 1

6 May 2017
19:00
Round 1

Ballintubber	1-15 (18) – (8) 1-5	Kiltane
(HT: 1-06 – 1-02)
Gls: C. O'Connor 1 (pen); Pts: C. O'Connor 9 (7f, 1'45), B. Walsh 2, C. Finnerty 2, J. Gibbons 1, A. Dillon 1		Gls: A. Carrabine 1 Pts: J. Reilly 3 (2f), B. McAndrew 1, A. Carrabine 1

Ballintubber, Ballintubber
Referee: K. Connelly (Hollymount Carramore)

7 May 2017
16:00
Round 1

Claremorris	0-19 (19) – (19) 4-7	Aghamore
(HT: 2-03 – 0-07)
Pts: J. Shaughnessy 8 (8f), C. Diskin 2, S. McGreal 2, A. Butler 1, J. McCormack 1 (f), F. McCormack 1, G. Commins 1, D. Egan 1, C. Gill 1, S. Diskin 1		Gls: A. Freeman 2, S. Tighe 1, R. Lyons 1 Pts: A. Freeman 3 (2f), S. Tighe 2 (1f), C. Lyons 1, R. Egan 1

Canon Gibbons Park, Claremorris
Referee: P. Lydon (Kiltimagh)

Round 2

17 June 2017
19:30
Round 2

Aghamore	0-12 (12) – (21) 2-15	Ballintubber
(HT: 0-05 – 1-09)
Pts: A. Freeman 7 (7f), F. Boland 4, K. Cassidy 1		Gls: C. O'Connor 1, S. O'Malley 1 Pts: C. O'Connor 6 (1f, 2 '45), C. Finnerty 3, A. Dillon 2, A. Plunkett 2, B. Walsh 1, S. O'Malley 1

Aghamore, Aghamore
Referee: E. McAndrew (Claremorris)

17 June 2017
18:00
Round 2

Kiltane	1-09 (12) – (16) 1-13	Claremorris
(HT: 0-04 – 1-07)
Gls: A. Carrabine 1 (pen); Pts: J. Reilly 3 (3f), J. Healy 3, M. Gallagher 1, S. Lindsay 1, A. Carrabine 1 (f)		Gls: C. Diskin 1 Pts: J. Shaughnessy 7 (7f), D. Takkos 2, C. Diskin 1, D. O'Reilly 1, R. Quirke 1, S. McGreal 1

Bangor Erris, Bangor Erris
Referee: M. Daly (Ballyhaunis)

Round 3

1 October 2017
15:30
Round 3

Ballintubber	0-16 (16) – (11) 1-8	Claremorris
(HT: 0-07 – 1-05)
Pts: C. O'Connor 4 (1f), P. O'Connor 3, A. Plunkett 2, J. Gibbons 1, A. Dillon 1, D. Coleman 1, D. Geraghty 1, C. Finnerty 1, D. O'Connor 1, S. O'Malley 1		Gls: J. Shaughnessy 1 Pts: D. O'Reilly 3, J. Shaughnessy 2 (1f), J. Stretton 1, J. McCormack 1 (f), S. Diskin 1

Flanagan Park, Ballinrobe
Referee: L. Devenney (Ballina Stephenites)

1 October 2017
15:30
Round 3

Kiltane	2-10 (16) – (15) 0-15	Aghamore
(HT: 1-02 – 0-10)
Gls: A. Carrabine 1 (pen), M. Sweeney 1 Pts: M. Sweeney 3, U. Corrigan 3, J. Reilly 2 (1f), M. Gallagher 1, T. Gaughan 1		Pts: R. Egan 7 (2f), F. Boland 4, A. Freeman 3 (2f), K. Feeney 1

James Stephens Park, Ballina
Referee: K. Connelly (Hollymount/Carramore)

=== Group 4 ===
Team	Pld	W	L	D	PF	PA	PD	Pts
Ballina Stephenites	3	3	0	0	50	34	+16	6
Castlebar Mitchels	3	2	1	0	57	38	+19	4
Crossmolina Deel Rovers	3	1	2	0	38	53	-15	2
Ballinrobe	3	0	3	0	36	56	-20	0

Round 1

7 May 2017
16:00
Round 1

Ballinrobe	0-12 (12) – (14) 1-11	Ballina Stephenites
(HT: 0-07 – 1-03)
Pts: D. McDonnell 8 (8f), K. Quinn 2, J. Murphy 1, D. Killeen 1		Gls: E. Regan 1 Pts: E. Regan 4 (4f), D. Tansey 2, C. Treacy 2, K. Tighe 1, K. Newell 1 (f), A. Corduff 1

Flanagan Park, Ballinrobe
Referee: J. Glavey (Aghamore)

7 May 2017
19:00
Round 1

Crossmolina Deel Rovers	1-07 (10) – (21) 2-15	Castlebar Mitchels
(HT: 0-01 – 1-07)
Gls: B. Benson 1 Pts: B. Benson 2 (1f), F. Duffy 2 (2f), J. Flynn 1, C. Carolan 1, C. Loftus 1 (f)		Gls: E. O'Reilly 1, D. Kirby 1 Pts: D. Stenson 7 (6f), N. Douglas 3, A. Walsh 2, P. Durcan 1, J. Durcan 1, C. Stenson 1

St. Tiernan's Park, Crossmolina
Referee: M. Daly (Ballyhaunis)

Round 2

17 June 2017
19:30
Round 2

Ballina Stephenites	2-13 (19) – (9) 1-06	Crossmolina Deel Rovers
(HT: 1-07 – 0-03)
Gls: C. Treacy 1, K. Newell 1 Pts: C. Treacy 6 (1f), K. Newell 3, E. Regan 3, S. Regan 1		Gls: F. Duffy 1 Pts: F. Duffy 1, S. Duffy 1, C. Carolan 1, B. Benson 1, H. Cafferty 1, D. McCormack 1

James Stephens Park, Ballina
Referee: G. McMahon (Davitts)

18 June 2017
14:00
Round 2

Castlebar Mitchels	1-20 (23) – (11) 1-08	Ballinrobe
(HT: 1-11 – 0-03)
Gls: N. Douglas 1 Pts: N. Douglas 9 (4f), D. Stenson 3 (2f), D. Kirby 2, J. Durcan 2, J. Maughan 1, P. Durcan 1, A. Walsh 1, S. Hopkins 1		Gls: D. McDonnell 1 Pts: D. McDonnell 4 (4f), S. Burke 1, J. Burke 1, K. Quinn 1, T. Quinn 1

Josie Munnelly Park, Castlebar
Referee: L. Devenney (Ballina)

Round 3

30 September 2017
16:00
Round 3

Ballina Stephenites	3-08 (17) – (13) 1-10	Castlebar Mitchels
(HT: 3-04 – 0-06)
Gls: L. Doherty 1, C. Treacy 1, E. Regan 1 Pts: C. Treacy 3, E. Regan 3 (2f), P. O'Hora 1, S. Sheridan 1		Gls: D. Stenson 1 Pts: D. Stenson 4 (3f), S. Hopkins 2, P. Durcan 1, B. Moran 1, C. Costello 1, N. Douglas 1

St. Joseph's Park, Knockmore
Referee: P. Lydon (Kiltimagh)

30 September 2017
18:30
Round 3

Crossmolina Deel Rovers	2-13 (16) – (13) 1-10	Ballinrobe
(HT: 0-05 – 1-08)
Gls: C. Carolan 1, K. Mulhern 1 Pts: F. Duffy 9 (8f), C. Loftus 1, P. Gardiner 1, D. Cadden 1, M. Gallagher 1		Gls: E. O'Brien 1 Pts: D. Vaughan 4 (2f), E. O'Brien 2 (1'45), J. Murphy 1, S. Biggins 1, S. Burke 1, J. Burke 1

MacHale Park, Castlebar
Referee: J. Henry (Castlebar)

== Knock-Out Stage ==
The top two teams in each group progressed to the knock-out stage. Group winners were drawn against group runners-up, and all games were played at neutral venues.

Quarter-Finals		Semi-Finals		Final
Castlebar Mitchels	1-13
Knockmore	0-13	Castlebar Mitchels	1-11; 2-14
Garrymore	4-13	Garrymore	1-11; 0-12
Ballina Stephenites	1-11			Castlebar Mitchels	0-15
Ballintubber	0-17; 0-18			Ballintubber	0-13
Hollymount-Carramore	0-17; 1-9	Ballintubber	3-16
Claremorris	1-10	Claremorris	2-9
Breaffy	0-12

=== Quarter-finals ===
7 October 2017
17:00
Quarter-Final

Castlebar Mitchels	1-13 (16) – (13) 0-13	Knockmore
(HT: 0-08 – 0-06)
Gls: P. Durcan 1 Pts: D. Stenson 6 (4f), P. Durcan 2, J. Durcan 2, N. Douglas 2, D. Kirby 1		Pts: P. Naughton 8 (7f), K. McLoughlin 2 (1f), Darren McHale 1, S. McHale 1, S. Ruttledge 1

James Stephen's Park, Ballina
Referee: K. Connelly (Hollymount/Carramore)

7 October 2017
18:00
Quarter-Final

Claremorris	1-10 (13) – (12) 0-12	Breaffy
(HT: 1-04 – 0-08)
Gls: D. Takkos 1 Pts: J. Shaughnessy 4 (3f), P. Barry 1, J. McCormack 1, D. O'Reilly 1, C. Diskin 1, S. Diskin 1, J. Gill 1		Pts: C. O'Shea 5 (4f), T. O'Reilly 2, A. O'Shea 2, R. Martyn 2, J. Minogue 1

MacHale Park, Castlebar
Referee: R. Gurren (Aghamore)

7 October 2017
19:30
Quarter-Final

Ballintubber	0-17 (17) – (17) 0-17	Hollymount Carramore
(HT: 0-11 – 0-07)
Pts: C. O'Connor 6 (4f), A. Dillon 3, C. Finnerty 3, A. Plunkett 2, D. Coleman 1, P. O'Connor 1, R. Geraghty 1		Pts: D. Coen 6 (3f), K. Feerick 5 (1f), C. Keane 4, I. Costello 1, S. Coen 1

MacHale Park, Castlebar
Referee: J. Glavey (Aghamore)

8 October 2017
14:00
Quarter-Final

Garrymore	4-13 (25) – (14) 1-11	Ballina Stephenites
(HT: 2-05 – 1-06)
Gls: M. Fallon 2, M. Tierney 2 Pts: J. Killeen 3, M. Tierney 2 (2f), C. Crowe 2, C. Slattery 2, T. Nally 1, B. Cunningham 1, G. Golden 1, M. Fallon 1		Gls: C. Treacy 1 Pts: C. Treacy 4 (2f), E. Regan 2 (2f), S. Regan 2, G. Cafferkey 1, L. Healy 1, P. O'Hora 1

Connacht GAA Centre of Excellence, Bekan
Referee: J. Henry (Castlebar Mitchels)

11 October 2017
20:00
Quarter-Final Replay

Ballintubber	0-18 (18) – (12) 1-09	Hollymount Carramore
(HT: 0-07 – 1-06)
Pts: A. Dillon 5 (1f), C. O'Connor 4 (1f, 2'45), C. Finnerty 3, D. O'Connor 2, M. Plunkett 1, D. Coleman 1, P. O'Connor 1, A. Plunkett 1		Gls: N. Moran 1 Pts: D. Coen 4 (3f), K. Feerick 3 (1f), R. Molloy 2

MacHale Park, Castlebar
Referee: L. Devenney (Ballina Stephenites)

=== Semi-finals ===
15 October 2017
13:30
Semi-Final

Report

Garrymore	1-11 (14) – (14) 1-11	Castlebar Mitchels
(HT: 0-04 – 0-07)
Gls: C. Slattery 1 Pts: J. Killeen 4 (2f), M. Tierney 2 (1f), S. Nally 2 (1f), D. Quinn 1, M. Connolly 1, J. King 1		Gls: D. Kirby 1 Pts: D. Stenson 3 (2f), N. Douglas 2 (1f), J. Maughan 1, J. McDonagh 1, D. Newcombe 1, J. Durcan 1, B. Moran 1, C. Costello 1

MacHale Park, Castlebar
Referee: J. Glavey (Aghamore)

15 October 2017
15:15
Semi-Final

Ballintubber	3-16 (25) – (15) 2-09	Claremorris
(HT: 3-10 – 0-02)
Gls: S. O'Malley 2, D. O'Connor 1 Pts: C. O'Connor 5 (2f, 1'45), S. O'Malley 5, D. O'Connor 1, D. Coleman 1, P. O'Connor 1, A. Dillon 1, A. Plunkett 1, S. Broderick 1		Gls: S. McGreal 1, M. Macken 1 Pts: J. Shaughnessy 5 (4f), J. McCormack 2, D. Egan 1, C. Diskin 1

MacHale Park, Castlebar
Referee: V. Neary (Bonniconlon)

18 October 2017
20:00
Semi-Final Replay

Report

Garrymore	0-12 (12) – (20) 2-14	Castlebar Mitchels
(HT: 0-04 – 2-04)
Pts: J. Killeen 5 (4f), M. Tierney 3 (2f), C. Slattery 2, G. Golden 1, T. Nally 1		Gls: D. Kirby 1, N. Douglas 1 Pts: D. Stenson 6 (3f), D. Kirby 3, N. Douglas 2 (1f), D. Newcombe 1, P. Durcan 1, B. Moran 1

MacHale Park, Castlebar
Referee: R. Gurren (Aghamore)

=== Final ===
22 October 2017
15:30
Final

Report

Ballintubber	0-13 (13) – (15) 0-15	Castlebar Mitchels
(HT: 0-09 – 0-07)
Pts: C. O'Connor 6 (5f), A. Plunkett 2, D. O'Connor 1, D. Coleman 1, A. Dillon 1 (f), M. Plunkett 1, J. Gibbons 1		Pts: D. Stenson 5 (4f), B. Moran 3, G. McDonagh 2, J. Durcan 2, D. Kirby 1, E. O'Reilly 1, N. Douglas 1

MacHale Park, Castlebar
Referee: B. Corcoran (Islandeady)
Attendance: 5,376

== Relegation Playoffs ==
The four teams who finished bottom of their groups entered the relegation play-offs, with the two losers of the semi-finals meeting in the relegation play-off final. All games were played at neutral venues. Ballinrobe, as losers of the final, were relegated to the Intermediate Championship for 2018.

=== Relegation Semi-Finals ===
7 October 2017
17:00
Relegation Semi-Final

Ballinrobe	1-09 (12) – (21) 2-15	Westport
(HT: 0-04 – 1-07)
Gls: E. O'Brien 1 Pts: E. O'Brien 4 (3f, 1'45), J. Burke 1, S. Burke 1, K. Quinn 1, D. Vaughan 1, J. Flannelly 1		Gls: C. Moran 2 Pts: K. Kilkelly 6 (4f), C. Moran 2, D. Horan 2, L. Keegan 1, P. Keegan 1, P. Lambert 1, R. Geraghty 1, A. Kennedy 1

Canon Gibbons Park, Claremorris
Referee: M. Daly (Ballyhaunis)

8 October 2017
13:30
Relegation Semi-Final

Davitts	1-11 (14) – (14) 0-14	Aghamore
(HT: 0-06 – 0-07)
Gls: A. Peters 1 (pen); Pts: E. Ronane 4 (1f), J. Ronayne 3 (1f), J. Clarke 1, C. Roache 1, A. Peters 1 (f), R. McNamara 1		Pts: A. Freeman 4 (4f), R. Egan 3 (2f), F. Boland 3, S. Óg Tighe 2, J. McNeive 1, B. Harrison 1

Ballyhaunis, Ballyhaunis
Referee: C. Collins (Lacken)

15 October 2017
13:00
Relegation Semi-Final Replay

Davitts	0-10 (10) – (17) 1-14	Aghamore
(HT: 0-08 – 1-04)
Pts: E. Ronane 4 (1f), A. Peters 2, J. Ronayne 1, R. McNamara 1 (f), M. Conroy 1 (f), P. Carey 1		Gls: S. Óg Tighe 1 Pts: A. Freeman 10 (7f, 1'45), R. Egan 2, F. Boland 2

Ballyhaunis, Ballyhaunis
Referee: J. Henry (Castlebar Mitchels)

=== Relegation Final ===
21 October 2017
Relegation Final

Ballinrobe	1-06 (9) – (22) 3-13	Davitts
(HT: 1-01 – 3-10)
Gls: K. Quinn 1 Pts: E. O'Brien 3 (2f), K. Quinn 2, J. Murphy 1		Gls: J. Ronayne 1, E. Ronane 1, M. Conroy 1 Pts: J. Ronayne 6 (2f), E. Ronane 3, M. Conroy 2 (2f), R. McNamara 2 (2f)

Connacht GAA Centre of Excellence, Bekan
Referee: J. Glavey (Aghamore)

== Connacht Senior Club Football Championship ==
Castlebar Mitchels went forward to represent Mayo in the Connacht Senior Club Football Championship. In the quarter-final they defeated Mohill of Leitrim by five points. They played Tourlestrane of Sligo in the semi-final, winning by seven points. The Connacht final took place in Tuam Stadium, where Castlebar faced reigning champions Corofin. A tightly fought contest ended level at full time, with Corofin eventually winning on a scoreline of 2–13 to 1–12 after extra time.

== Awards ==
The Club Stars, sponsored by The Mayo News, AIB and O'Neills, honoured the best 15 players in the Senior Championship in 2017. The team was selected by Sean Rice (The Mayo News), John Casey (RTÉ Radio analyst), Eamon Clarke (former Knockmore manager) and Austin Garvin (The Mayo News). Awards were also presented for Footballer of the Year, Young Player of the Year, Manager of the Year and Personality of the Year.

=== Individual awards ===
- Footballer of the Year - Ger McDonagh (Castlebar)
- Young Player of the Year - Niall McManamon (Westport)
- Manager of the Year - Declan O'Reilly and Declan Shaw (Castlebar) jointly with John Maughan (Lahardane)
- Personality of the Year - Andy Moran (Ballaghaderreen)
- Golden Boot - Cillian O'Connor (Ballintubber)

=== Team of the Year ===
Pos.	Player	Team
GK	Rory Byrne	Castlebar
RCB	Michael Plunkett	Ballintubber
FB	Ger McDonagh ^{FOTY}	Castlebar
LCB	Donie Newcombe	Castlebar
RWB	Trevor Nally	Garrymore
CB	James McCormack	Claremorris
LWB	Paddy Durcan	Castlebar
MD	Jason Gibbons	Ballintubber
MD	Barry Moran	Castlebar
RWF	Kevin McLoughlin	Knockmore
CF	Alan Dillon	Ballintubber
LWF	Kevin Feerick	Hollymount Carramore
RCF	David Stenson	Castlebar
FF	Cillian O'Connor	Ballintubber
LCF	Danny Kirby	Castlebar
Sub	Gary Loftus	Ballintubber
Sub	Jamie Oates	Garrymore
Sub	Cian Costello	Castlebar
Sub	James Shaughnessy	Claremorris
Sub	Brian Reape	Moy Davitts
