= Peter Ford (Gaelic footballer) =

Mayo Gaelic footballer and manager of Galway and Sligo

Personal information
- Native name: Peadar Mac Giollarnáth (Irish)
- Born: 28 January 1962 (age 64) Ballinrobe, County Mayo
- Occupation: Secondary school teacher
- Height: 6 ft 1 in (185 cm)

Sport
- Sport: Gaelic football
- Position: Full-back
Club
- Years: Club
- 1980s–1990s: St Mary's
Inter-county
- Years: County
- 1980s–1990s: Mayo
Inter-county titles
- Connacht titles: 0
- All-Irelands: 0
- NFL: 0
- All Stars: 0

Peter Ford (born 28 January 1962) is an Irish former sportsman. He played Gaelic football with Sligo club St Mary's and was a member of the senior Mayo county team in the 1980s and 1990s. Ford later served as manager of the Galway and Sligo teams.

He departed as Galway manager in August 2007.

He has also managed Breaffy.

He is a secondary school teacher.

Sporting positions
Preceded by John Finn	Mayo Senior Football Captain; 1992	Succeeded by Kevin Beirne
Preceded by Mickey Moran	Sligo Senior Football Manager; 2000–2003	Succeeded by James Kearins
Preceded by John O'Mahony	Galway Senior Football Manager; 2004–2007	Succeeded by Liam Sammon
