= Martin McNally =

Gaelic footballer and referee

Martin McNally is a former Gaelic footballer, referee and a member of the National Referees Panel.

A member of the Corduff GAA club in County Monaghan, McNally played the sport before he injured himself doing it in 2011. He was appointed to the National Referees Panel in 2014, four years before being included among the championship match officials for the first time. He took charge of the 2021 Leinster Senior Football Championship final, the 2023 All-Ireland Under-20 Football Championship final, the 2024 Ulster Senior Football Championship final, the 2025 Leinster Senior Football Championship final, and the All-Ireland Club Senior Football Championship final in 2026.

Later in 2026, McNally officiated two matches in the 2026 Leinster Senior Football Championship (Louth v Wexford and Kildare v Westmeath), followed by Armagh v Derry and Dublin v Donegal in the All-Ireland series, then the Cork–Mayo quarter-final. On 15 July, he was appointed to referee the All-Ireland Football Final, the 2026 All-Ireland Senior Football Championship final. This made him the second Corduff representative to officiate, after Pat McEnaney. It would be his 32nd SFC match. During it Mayo manager, Andy Moran, and captain, Jack Coyne, expressed their displeasure with some of his decisions. However, Mayo went on to win a first All-Ireland title for three quarters of a century, and ‘’Gaelic Life‘’ reported that events ‘’passed off without controversy‘’. He was presented with a match ball afterwards to commemorate the occasion.

McNally officiated at the 2023 All-Ireland Senior Football Championship final, when he was linesman and standby referee. He also officiated at the 2025 All-Ireland Senior Football Championship final, when he was linesman and standby referee.
