= 2020 Leinster Senior Football Championship final =

- Event: 2020 Leinster Senior Championship
Dublin	Meath
3–21	0–9
- Date: 21 November 2020
- Venue: Croke Park, Dublin
- Referee: Derek O'Mahoney (Tipperary)
- Attendance: 0 (Note: The game was played behind closed doors due to the impact of the COVID-19 pandemic on Gaelic games.)

The 2020 Leinster Senior Football Championship final was played at Croke Park in Dublin on 21 November 2020. It was contested by Dublin and Meath. Dublin won a tenth consecutive title.

== Background ==
The game was held on a date originally intended for the second test of the 2020 International Rules Series. That event was cancelled in April 2020 amid the COVID-19 pandemic in the Republic of Ireland, which also led to the delayed championship. The GAA had proposed to hold a memorial ahead of the second test in commemoration of the 100th anniversary of the Bloody Sunday massacre, which saw fourteen civilians killed at a football match at Croke Park during the Irish War of Independence. This was instead held ahead of the 2020 Leinster Senior Football Championship Final.

As originally announced, the GAA intended the game to occur after a ceremonial "finishing of the match" featuring Dublin and Tipperary teams consisting of "available county or club players". However, Dublin were playing in this game and Tipperary qualified for the 2020 Munster Senior Football Championship Final which was held the following day, limiting player availability.

== Match details ==
21 November 2020

Dublin	3–21 – 0–9	Meath
	Report

Croke Park, Dublin
Referee: Derek O'Mahoney (Tipperary)

Dublin	Meath

1	Stephen Cluxton (c)
2	M. Fitzsimons
3	Jonny Cooper
4	Eoin Murchan
5	J. McCarthy
6	J. Small
7	R. McDaid
8	Brian Fenton
9	D. Byrne
10	N. Scully
11	C. Kilkenny
12	S. Bugler
13	P. Small
14	C. O'Callaghan
15	Dean Rock
Substitutes:
?	B. Howard for Cooper
?	P. Mannion for P. Small
?	E. Lowndes for J. Small
?	C. Costello for O'Callaghan
?	K. McManamon for Kilkenny
Manager:
Dessie Farrell

1	M. Brennan
2	S. Lavin
3	C. McGill
4	D. Toner
5	Donal Keogan
6	Shane McEntee
7	M. Costello
8	B. Menton
9	R. Jones
10	C. O'Sullivan
11	B. McMahon
12	R. Ryan
13	J. Morris
14	S. Walsh
15	T. O'Reilly
Substitutes:
?	C. Hickey for Toner
?	E. Harkin for McGill
?	E. Devine for Costello
?	J. Scully for McMahon
?	J. Wallace for O'Reilly
Manager:
Andy McEntee

Man of the Match:

== Post-match ==
Dublin captain Stephen Cluxton laid a wreath for the centenary.

Former Dublin player Ciarán Whelan said the result was "worrying" for the sport and that his former team "have their opponents psychologically smashed".

The result, combined with the COVID-19 pandemic, meant Dublin directly qualified for an All-Ireland semi-final against Cavan. Dublin won, easily, to qualify for the 2020 All-Ireland Senior Football Championship Final, the eighth time in ten years that Dublin reached the decider.
