= Donnacha McHugh =

Mayo Gaelic footballer

Personal information
- Native name: Donnacha Mac Aodha (Irish)
- Born: 2002 (age 23–24) Castlebar, County Mayo, Ireland

Sport
- Sport: Gaelic football
- Position: Full-back
Club
- Years: Club
- 2020–present: Castlebar Mitchels
Club titles
- Mayo titles: 0
Inter-county
- Years: County
- 2022–present: Mayo
Inter-county titles
- Connacht titles: 0
- All-Irelands: 1
- NFL: 1
- All Stars: 0

Donnacha McHugh (born 2002) is an Irish Gaelic footballer. At club level he plays with Castlebar Mitchels and at inter-county level with the Mayo senior football team.

== Career ==
Born and raised in Castlebar, County Mayo, McHugh first played Gaelic football at juvenile and underage levels with the Castlebar Mitchels club. He won a Mayo MAFC title in September 2020, before progressing to adult level.

McHugh attended St Gerald's College in Castlebar and lined out in all grades of Gaelic football during his time there. He also played soccer. McHugh won a Connacht PPS SAFC medal in March 2020, following a 1–13 to 0–10 win over Summerhill College in the final.

McHugh first appeared on the inter-county scene for Mayo as part of the under-20 team that lost consecutive Connacht U20FC finals in 2021 and 2022. He made his senior team debut in a National League game against Donegal in January 2022. McHugh won a National League medal in April 2023, following Mayo's 0–14 to 0–11 win over Galway in the final.

McHugh lined out at full-back when Mayo played Kerry in the 2026 All-Ireland SFC final and ended the game with an All-Ireland SFC medal following the 1–20 to 1–17 win, with Mayo claiming their first title in 75 years.

== Honours ==
St Gerald's College

- Connacht PPS Senior A Football Championship (1): 2020

Castlebar Mitchels

- Mayo Minor Football Championship (1): 2020

Mayo

- All-Ireland Senior Football Championship (1): 2026
- National Football League: (1) 2023
