= Jack Livingstone =

Mayo Gaelic footballer

Personal information
- Native name: Seán Ó Duinnshléibhe (Irish)
- Born: 2002 (age 23–24) Breaffy, County Mayo, Ireland
- Occupation: Construction manager
- Height: 6 ft 1 in (185 cm)

Sport
- Sport: Gaelic football
- Position: Goalkeeper
Club
- Years: Club
- 2020–present: Breaffy
Club titles
- Mayo titles: 0
College
- Years: College
- 2021–2025: ATU Galway
College titles
- Sigerson titles: 0
Inter-county*
Years	County	Apps (scores)
2026–	Mayo	6 (0–00)
Inter-county titles
- Connacht titles: 0
- All-Irelands: 1
- NFL: 0
- All Stars: 0
- *Inter County team apps and scores correct as of 10:19, 29 July 2026.

Jack Livingstone (born 2002) is an Irish Gaelic footballer. At club level he plays with Breaffy and at inter-county level with the Mayo senior football team.

== Career ==
Born and raised in Breaffy, County Mayo, Livingstone first played Gaelic football at juvenile and underage levels with the Breaffy club, before progressing to adult level. He lined out in goal for Breaffy's 0–06 to 0–04 defeat by Ballina Stephenites in the 2023 Mayo SFC final.

Livingstone attended St Gerald's College in Castlebar and lined out in all grades of Gaelic football during his time there. He won a Connacht PPS SAFC medal in March 2020, following a 1–13 to 0–10 win over Summerhill College in the final. Livingstone continued his Gaelic football development during his time as a student at ATU Galway, as a member of the university's Sigerson Cup team.

Livingstone never played at minor or under-20 levels for Mayo, but was drafted onto the senior team as sub-goalkeeper in 2026. He made his debut in a National League game against Roscommon in March 2026, before later taking over from Rob Hennelly as first-choice goalkeeper. Livingstone lined out in goal when Mayo played Kerry in the 2026 All-Ireland SFC final and ended the game with an All-Ireland SFC medal following the 1–20 to 1–17 win, with Mayo claiming their first title in 75 years.

== Career statistics ==
As of 26 July 2026

Team	Year	National League			Connacht		All-Ireland		Total	
Team	Year	Division	Apps	Score	Apps	Score	Apps	Score	Apps	Score
Mayo	2026	Division 1	1	0-00	0	0-00	6	0-00	7	0-00
Career total			1	0-00	0	0-00	6	0-00	7	0-00

== Honours ==
St Gerald's College

- Connacht PPS Senior A Football Championship (1): 2020

Mayo

- All-Ireland Senior Football Championship (1): 2026
