= John Finn (Gaelic footballer) =

Mayo Gaelic footballer

Personal information
- Native name: Seán Ó Finn (Irish)
- Born: 20 November 1963 (age 62) Claremorris, County Mayo, Ireland
- Occupation: Sales rep
- Height: 6 ft 0 in (183 cm)

Sport
- Sport: Gaelic football
- Position: Left wing-back
Club
- Years: Club
- Mayo Gaels
Club titles
- Mayo titles: 0
Inter-county
- Years: County
- 1984–1995: Mayo
Inter-county titles
- Connacht titles: 5
- All-Irelands: 0
- NFL: 0
- All Stars: 0

John Finn (born 20 November 1963) is an Irish former Gaelic footballer. At club level he played with Mayo Gaels and was also a member of the Mayo senior football team.

== Career ==
Finn started his Gaelic football as a schoolboy at Facefield National School before further developing at St Colman's College in Claremorris. He captained the college's senior team to the Connacht Colleges SFC title in 1981. By this stage, Finn had also started playing at adult level with the Mayo Gaels club. He won a Mayo IFC title in 1984.

Finn first appeared for Mayo as a member of the minor team that won the Connacht MFC title in 1980. He was later drafted onto the under-21 team and, as well as winning consecutive Connacht U21FC titles, also claimed an All-Ireland U21FC medal in 1983. Finn joined the senior team in 1984 and was a mainstay of the team for over a decade. During that time, he won five Connacht SFC medals and was at left wing-back when Mayo were beaten by Cork in the 1989 All-Ireland SFC final.

== Honours ==
St Colman's College

- Connacht Colleges Senior Football Championship: 1981

Mayo Gaels

- Mayo Intermediate Football Championship: 1984

Mayo

- Connacht Senior Football Championship: 1985, 1988, 1989, 1992, 1993
- National Football League Division 2: 1985–86
- All-Ireland Under-21 Football Championship: 1983
- Connacht Under-21 Football Championship: 1983, 1984, 1985
- Connacht Minor Football Championship: 1980
