= Jack Coyne =

Mayo Gaelic footballer

Personal information
- Native name: Seán Ó Cadhain (Irish)
- Born: 2000 (age 25–26) Ballyhaunis, County Mayo, Ireland
- Occupation: Student
- Height: 6 ft 1 in (185 cm)

Sport
- Sport: Gaelic football
- Position: Right corner-back
Club
- Years: Club
- Ballyhaunis
Club titles
	Football	Hurling
Mayo titles	0	1
College(s)
- Years: College
- 2019-2023 2025-2026: University of Limerick; University of Galway
Inter-county
- Years: County
- 2020–present: Mayo
Inter-county titles
- Connacht titles: 1
- All-Irelands: 1
- NFL: 1
- All Stars: 0

Jack Coyne (born 2000) is an Irish Gaelic footballer. At club level he plays with Ballyhaunis and at inter-county level with the Mayo senior football team.

== Early life ==
Born and raised in Ballyhaunis, County Mayo, Coyne was educated at Ballyhaunis Community School and played in all grades of Gaelic football and hurling during his time there. During his studies at the University of Limerick (UL), he continued his Gaelic football development. Coyne was part of the UL team that lost consecutive Sigerson Cup finals in 2022 and 2023. In spite of these defeats, he was named on the Sigerson Cup Team of the Year in 2023.

== Club career ==
Coyne began his club career at juvenile and underage levels with the Ballyhaunis club, before progressing to adult level as a dual player. He was at full-back when Ballyhaunis beat Tooreen by 1–15 to 1–12 to win the Mayo SHC title in September 2020. After losing two Mayo IFC finals, Coyne claimed a winners' medal in that competition after Ballyhaunis's 0-13 to 0-10 win over Kilmeena in the final in October 2022.

== Inter-county career ==
Coyne first appeared on the inter-county scene for Mayo as a member of the minor team that was beaten by Galway in the Connacht MFC quarter-final in April 2017. He subsequently progressed to the under-20 team and served as team captain in 2020.

Coyne's time in the under-20 grade had just ended when he was drafted onto the senior team and he was a member of the extended panel when Mayo had a 2–14 to 0–15 defeat by Dublin in the COVID-delayed All-Ireland SFC final in December 2020. Coyne made his debut during Mayo's Connacht SFC–winning campaign in 2021. He was, once again, a member of the extended panel for Mayo's 2–14 to 0–15 defeat by Tyrone in the 2021 All-Ireland SFC final.

After being dropped from the panel by manager James Horan in early 2022, Coyne was recalled under new manager Kevin McStay a year later. He won a National Football League medal in April 2023, following Mayo's 0–14 to 0–11 win over Galway in the final. Coyne was a GAA/GPA All Star nominee in September 2025.

Coyne was appointed team captain by new manager Andy Moran in November 2025. He captained the team from right corner-back when Mayo played Kerry in the 2026 All-Ireland SFC final and ended the game with an All-Ireland SFC medal following the 1–20 to 1–17 win, with Mayo claiming their first title in 75 years.

== Honours ==
Ballyhaunis

- Mayo Senior Hurling Championship (1): 2019
- Mayo Intermediate Football Championship (2): 2022

Mayo

- All-Ireland Senior Football Championship (1): 2026
- Connacht Senior Football Championship: (1) 2021
- National Football League: (1) 2023
- FBD Insurance League: (1) 2023

Sporting positions
Preceded by Paddy Durcan	Mayo senior football team captain 2026–	Succeeded by Incumbent
Achievements
Preceded by Gavin White	All-Ireland SFC final winning captain 2026	Succeeded by Incumbent
