= 2021 Leinster Senior Football Championship final =

- Event: 2021 Leinster Senior Championship
Dublin	Kildare
0–20	1–9
- Date: 1 August 2021
- Venue: Croke Park, Dublin
- Referee: Martin McNally (Monaghan)
- Attendance: 18,000

The 2021 Leinster Senior Football Championship final was played at Croke Park in Dublin on 1 August 2021. It was contested by Dublin and Kildare. Dublin won an 11th consecutive title.

== Match details ==
RTÉ

1 August 2021
16:00 IST (UTC+1)
Final

Dublin	0-20 (20) – (12) 1-09	Kildare
(HT: 0-9 - 0-5)

Croke Park, Dublin
Referee: Martin McNally (Monaghan)
Attendance: 18,000

Dublin	Kildare

1	Evan Comerford
2	M. Fitzsimons
3	David Byrne
4	Sean McMahon
5	Brian Howard
6	Johnny Cooper
7	John Small
8	James McCarthy
9	Brian Fenton
10	Paddy Small
11	C. Kilkenny
12	Niall Scully
13	Cormac Costelloo
14	C. O'Callaghan
15	Dean Rock
Substitutes:
?	E Murchan for J. Small
?	Colm Basquel for Rock
?	Sean Bulger for P.Small
?	Tom Lahiff for Cooper
?	K. Ryan Basquel for O'Callaghan
?	Emmet Ó Conghaile for Kilkenny
Manager:
Dessie Farrell

1	M. Donnellan
2	Mark Dempsey
3	Mick O'Grady
4	Darragh Malone
5	David Hyland
6	Ryan Houlihan
7	Kevin Flynn
8	Luke Flynn
9	Aaron Masterson
10	Shea Ryan
11	Ben McCormack
12	Fergal Conway
13	Neil Flynn
14	Daniel Flynn
15	Jimmy Hyland
Substitutes:
?	Alex Beirne for Conway
?	Niall Kelly for Houlihan
?	Darragh Kirwan for J Hyland
?	Brian McLoughlin for N Flynn
?	Shane O'Sullivan for McCormack
Manager:
Jack O'Connor

Man of the Match:
