= David McBrien =

Mayo Gaelic footballer

Personal information
- Native name: Daithí Mac Briain (Irish)
- Born: 2000 (age 25–26) Ballaghaderreen, County Roscommon, Ireland
- Occupation: Secondary school teacher

Sport
- Sport: Gaelic football
- Position: Centre-back
Club
- Years: Club
- 2018-present: Ballaghaderreen
Club titles
- Mayo titles: 0
College
- Years: College
- 2018-2022: University of Limerick
Inter-county
- Years: County
- 2020–present: Mayo
Inter-county titles
- Connacht titles: 0
- All-Irelands: 1
- NFL: 1
- All Stars: 0

David McBrien (born 2000) is an Irish Gaelic footballer. At club level he plays with Ballaghaderreen and at inter-county level with the Mayo senior football team.

== Career ==
Born and raised in Ballaghaderreen, County Roscommon, McBrien first played Gaelic football at juvenile and underage levels with the Ballaghaderreen club. He was wing-back for the club's 1–14 to 1–11 defeat by Ballintubber in the 2019 Mayo SFC final.

McBrien attended St Nathy's College and lined out in all grades of Gaelic football during his time there. He was part of the college's senior team beaten by Holy Trinity College, Cookstown in the 2018 All-Ireland PPS SBFC final. McBrien continued his Gaelic football development during his time as a student at the University of Limerick.

At inter-county level, McBrien first appeared for Mayo during a two-year tenure as a member of the under-20 team. He made his senior team debut during the 2020 National League and was also part of the senior team's extended panel for their consecutive All-Ireland SFC final defeats in 2020 and 2021.

McBrien remained on the panel for the next few years and won a National League medal in April 2023, following Mayo's 0–14 to 0–11 win over Galway in the final. He lined out at centre-back when Mayo played Kerry in the 2026 All-Ireland SFC final and ended the game with an All-Ireland SFC medal following the 1–20 to 1–17 win, with Mayo claiming their first title in 75 years.

== Honours ==
St Nathy's College

- Connacht PPS Senior B Football Championship (1): 2018

Mayo

- All-Ireland Senior Football Championship (1): 2026
- National Football League: (1) 2023
