= Bob Tuohy (Gaelic footballer) =

Mayo Gaelic footballer

Personal information
- Native name: Roibeárd Ó Tuathaigh (Irish)
- Born: 2003 (age 22–23) Castlebar, County Mayo, Ireland
- Occupation: Student

Sport
- Sport: Gaelic football
- Position: Midfield
Club
- Years: Club
- 2021–present: Castlebar Mitchels
Club titles
- Mayo titles: 0
College
- Years: College
- Mary Immaculate College
College titles
- Sigerson titles: 0
Inter-county
- Years: County
- 2023–present: Mayo
Inter-county titles
- Connacht titles: 0
- All-Irelands: 1
- NFL: 1
- All Stars: 0

Bob Tuohy (born 2003) is an Irish Gaelic footballer. At club level he plays with Castlebar Mitchels and at inter-county level with the Mayo senior football team.

== Career ==
Born and raised in Castlebar, County Mayo, Tuohy first played Gaelic football at juvenile and underage levels with the Castlebar Mitchels club. He was part of the club's under-21 team that won consecutive Mayo U21FC titles in 2023 and 2024.

Tuohy attended St Gerald's College in Castlebar and lined out in all grades of Gaelic football during his time there. He won a Mayo PPS SAFC title in December 2021, following a 4–14 to 0–10 win over St Muredach's College in the final. Tuohy continued his Gaelic football development during his time as a student at Mary Immaculate College in Limerick, and was part of the university's Trench Cup team in 2026.

At inter-county level, Tuohy first appeared for Mayo as a member of the minor team in 2020. He was later part of the under-20 team that lost a second consecutive Connacht U20FC final in 2022 during his time with the team.

Tuohy made hise senior team debut in a National League draw with Galway in January 2023. He ended the campaign with a winners' medal, following Mayo's 0–14 to 0–11 win over Galway in the final. Tuohy lined out at midfield when Mayo played Kerry in the 2026 All-Ireland SFC final and ended the game with an All-Ireland SFC medal following the 1–20 to 1–17 win, with Mayo claiming their first title in 75 years.

== Honours ==
St Gerald's College

- Mayo PPS Senior A Football Championship (1): 2022

Castlebar Mitchels

- Mayo Under-21 A Football Championship (2): 2023, 2024

Mayo

- All-Ireland Senior Football Championship (1): 2026
- National Football League: (1) 2023
