= Aghamore, County Mayo =

Aghamore Achadh Mór
- Village
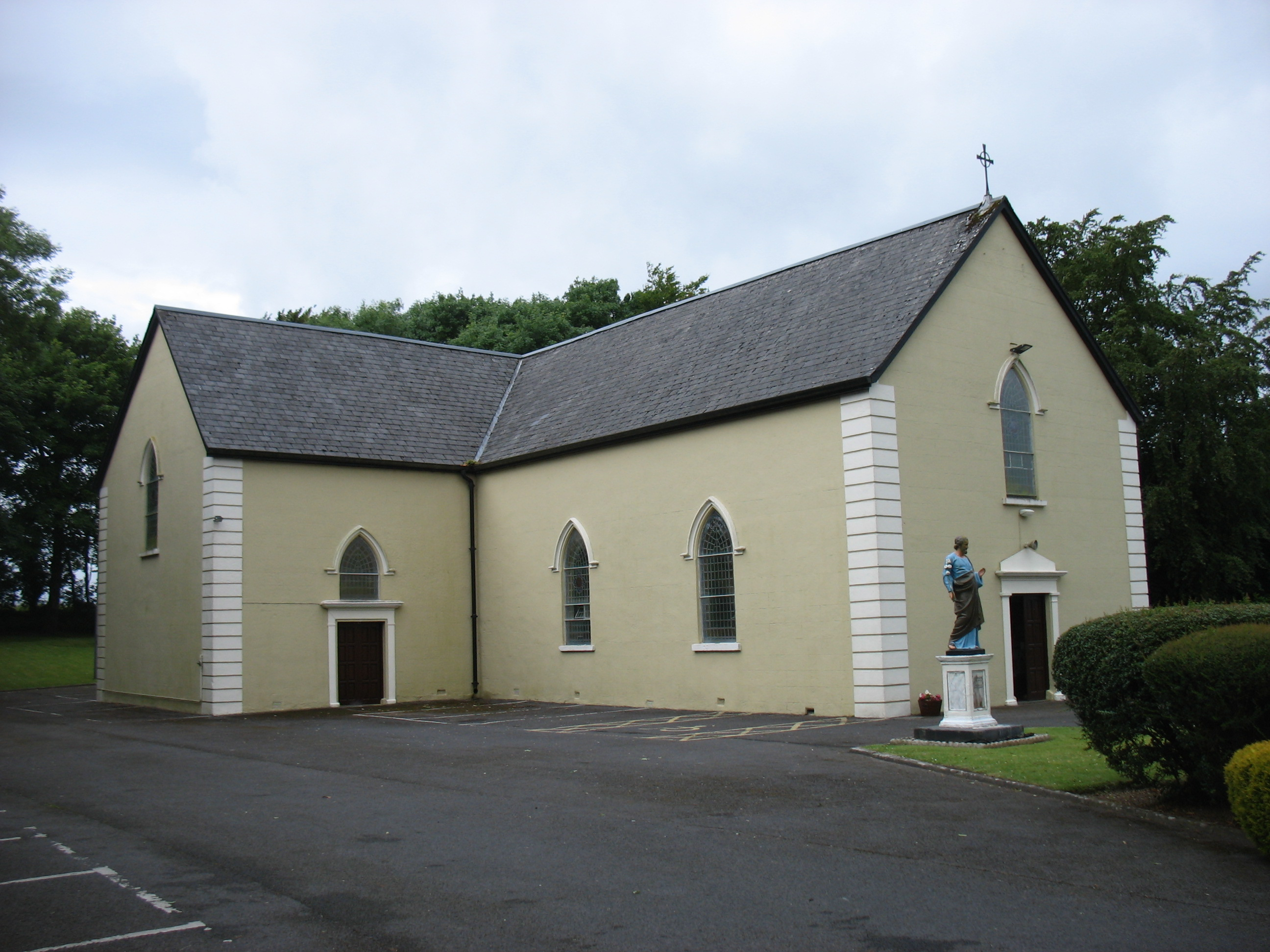
- Aghamore Catholic church

- Location in Ireland
- Coordinates: 53°49′39″N 8°49′24″W
- Country: Ireland
- Province: Connacht
- County: County Mayo
- Elevation: 78 m (256 ft)
- Time zone: UTC+0 (WET)
  - Summer (DST): UTC-1 (IST (WEST))
- Irish Grid Reference: M455868

Aghamore (Irish: Achadh Mór, meaning 'big field'), also known as Aughamore, is a village in County Mayo, Ireland. It is in a townland and civil parish of the same name.

== Sport ==
The parish is home to Aghamore GFC (a Gaelic football club) and Tooreen Hurling Club.
