= 2026 Munster Senior Football Championship final =

- Event: 2026 Munster Senior Football Championship
| Kerry | Cork |
| 1–23 | 1–15 |
- Date: 10 May 2026
- Venue: Fitzgerald Stadium, Killarney
- Referee: Paul Faloon (Down)
- Attendance: 32,691

The 2026 Munster Senior Football Championship final was played at Fitzgerald Stadium in Killarney on 10 May 2026. It was contested by Kerry and Cork. Kerry won their 87th championship and their sixth in a row.

== Route to final ==
Quarter-final: Cork 4-16 Limerick 1-16; Kerry (BYE)

Semi-final: Kerry 2-19 Clare 1-14; Cork 4-18 Tipperary 1-12

== Match details ==
10 May 2026

| Kerry | 1–23 – 1–15 | Cork |
|---|---|---|
| David Clifford 1-6 (1tp, 1f), Tony Brosnan 0-5 (1tp), Keith Evans 0-2, Armin Heinrich 0-2, Tomás Kennedy 0-2 (2f), Mike Breen 0-1, Micheál Burns 0-1, Paudie Clifford 0-1, Gavin White 0-1, Dylan Geaney 0-1, Killian Spillane 0-1 | Report | Mark Cronin 0-5 (1tp, 1f), Brian O'Driscoll 1-2 (1tp), Seán McDonnell 0-2 (tp), Chris Óg Jones 0-2, Steven Sherlock 0-2 (1'45), Colm O'Callaghan 0-1, David Buckley 0-1 |

Fitzgerald Stadium, Killarney, Kerry
Attendance: 32,691
Referee: Paul Faloon (Down)

| Kerry | Cork |

| GK | 1 | Shane Murphy |
| FB | 2 | Evan Looney |
| FB | 3 | Jason Foley |
| FB | 4 | Dylan Casey |
| HB | 5 | Tadhg Morley | (substituted off) 65' |
| HB | 6 | Mike Breen |
| HB | 7 | Armin Heinrich | (substituted off) 36' |
| MF | 8 | Mark O'Shea |
| MF | 9 | Seán O'Brien |
| HF | 10 | Micheál Burns | (substituted off) 62' |
| HF | 11 | Paudie Clifford | (substituted off) 36' |
| HF | 12 | Diarmuid O'Connor |
| FF | 13 | David Clifford |
| FF | 23 | Tomás Kennedy | (substituted off) 54' |
| FF | 15 | Keith Evans |
Substitutes:
| | 16 | Seán Broderick |
| | 17 | Tony Brosnan | (substituted on) 36' |
| | 18 | Cillian Trant | (substituted on) 62' |
| | 19 | Killian Spillane | (substituted on) 54' |
| | 20 | Eddie Healy | (substituted on) 65' |
| | 21 | Gavin White | (substituted on) 36' |
| | 22 | Dylan Geaney |
| | 14 | Paul Geaney (c) |
| | 24 | Donagh O'Sullivan |
| | 25 | Joey Nagle |
| | 26 | Ciarán Collins |
Manager:
Jack O'Connor

| GK | 1 | Patrick Doyle |
| FB | 2 | Maurice Shanley |
| FB | 3 | Daniel O'Mahony |
| FB | 4 | Seán Meehan | (substituted off) 48' |
| HB | 5 | Brian O'Driscoll |
| HB | 6 | Tommy Walsh |
| HB | 7 | Luke Fahy |
| MF | 8 | Colm O'Callaghan |
| MF | 9 | Ian Maguire (c) |
| HF | 10 | Paul Walsh | (substituted off) 59' |
| HF | 11 | Seán McDonnell | (substituted off) 63' |
| HF | 12 | Ruairí Deane | (substituted off) 48' |
| FF | 13 | Mark Cronin |
| FF | 14 | Chris Óg Jones |
| FF | 15 | Steven Sherlock |
Substitutes:
| | 16 | Micheál Martin |
| | 17 | Seán Brady | (substituted on) 48' (substituted off) 65' |
| | 18 | Rory Maguire | (substituted on) 65' |
| | 19 | Darragh Cashman |
| | 20 | Mattie Taylor |
| | 21 | Seán Walsh | (substituted on) 63' |
| | 22 | Conor Cahalane |
| | 23 | David Buckley | (substituted on) 59' |
| | 24 | Eoghan McSweeney |
| | 25 | Conor Corbett | (substituted on) 48' |
| | 26 | Conor Daly |
Manager:
John Cleary

Man of the Match:

David Clifford
