= 2020 International Rules Series =

- Event: International Rules Series
Ireland	Australia

First test
Ireland	Australia
- Date: 15 November 2020 (cancelled)

Second test
Australia	Ireland
- Date: 21 November 2020 (cancelled)

The 2020 International Rules Series was to have been the 21st International Rules Series contested by Gaelic footballers from Ireland and Australian footballers from Australia. The series would have been held in Ireland and was to be the first series to be arranged by the Gaelic Athletic Association (GAA) and Australian Football League (AFL) since November 2017.
It was cancelled in April 2020 amid the COVID-19 pandemic in the Republic of Ireland.

== Background ==
The previous series between the countries had been held in and won by Australia in November 2017. As the GAA had scheduled an exhibition hurling match between Galway and Kilkenny at the Sydney Showground Stadium in November 2018, the two associations met to discuss the prospect of holding a series the following year. As time passed, plans for a series in 2019 did not materialise, and the GAA eventually confirmed that insufficient time remained to stage the event. In November 2019 the AFL and GAA proposed dates for a two-test series in 2020 to be held in Ireland. The GAA also proposed to hold a memorial ahead of the second test in commemoration of the 100th anniversary of the Bloody Sunday massacre, which saw fourteen civilians killed at a Gaelic football match at Croke Park during the Irish War of Independence. On 4 April 2020, shortly after the initial wave of the coronavirus pandemic in Australia, the AFL announced the cancellation of the series.

== See also ==
- International rules football
- Relationship between Gaelic football and Australian rules football
