= Eoin McGreal =

Mayo Gaelic footballer

Personal information
- Native name: Eoin Mac Réill (Irish)
- Born: 2006 (age 19–20) Killeenrevagh, County Mayo, Ireland
- Occupation: Student

Sport
- Sport: Gaelic football
- Position: Left corner-back
Club
- Years: Club
- 2024–present: Garrymore
Club titles
- Mayo titles: 0
College
- Years: College
- 2024–present: University of Limerick
College titles
- Sigerson titles: 0
Inter-county*
Years	County	Apps (scores)
2026–	Mayo	5 (0–00)
Inter-county titles
- Connacht titles: 0
- All-Irelands: 1
- NFL: 0
- All Stars: 0
- *Inter County team apps and scores correct as of 10:19, 29 July 2026.

Eoin McGreal (born 2006) is an Irish Gaelic footballer. At club level he plays with Garrymore and at inter-county level with the Mayo senior football team.

== Career ==
Born and raised in Killeenrevagh, County Mayo, McGreal first played Gaelic football at juvenile and underage levels with the Garrymore club, before progressing to adult level.

McGreal attended St Colman's College in Claremorris and lined out in all grades of Gaelic football during his time there. He continued his Gaelic football development during his time as a student at the University of Limerick, and was part of the team that won the Sigerson Cup title in 2026.

At inter-county level, McGreal first appeared for Mayo as a member of the minor team that won the Conancht MFC title in 2023. He ended the season by being named on the Team of the Year. McGreal immediately progressed to the under-20 team and won a Connacht U20FC medal in 2025.

McGreal made his debut in a National League game against Galway in January 2026. He lined out at left corner-back when Mayo played Kerry in the 2026 All-Ireland SFC final and ended the game with an All-Ireland SFC medal following the 1–20 to 1–17 win, with Mayo claiming their first title in 75 years.

== Career statistics ==
As of 26 July 2026

Team	Year	National League			Connacht		All-Ireland		Total	
Team	Year	Division	Apps	Score	Apps	Score	Apps	Score	Apps	Score
Mayo	2026	Division 1	1	0-00	0	0-00	5	0-00	6	0-00
Career total			1	0-00	0	0-00	5	0-00	6	0-00

== Honours ==
University of Limerick

- Sigerson Cup (1): 2026

Mayo

- All-Ireland Senior Football Championship (1): 2026
- Connacht Under-20 Football Championship (1): 2025
- Connacht Minor Football Championship (1): 2023
