= Tom Parsons (Gaelic footballer) =

Irish Gaelic footballer

Personal information
- Native name: Tomás Mac an Phearsúin (Irish)
- Born: 1988 (age 37–38) Sligo, Ireland
- Height: 1.91 m (6 ft 3 in)

Sport
- Sport: Gaelic football
- Position: Midfield
Club
- Years: Club
- 2005–: Charlestown Sarsfields
Inter-county
- Years: County
- 2008–2021: Mayo
Inter-county titles
- Connacht titles: 2

Tom Parsons (born 1988) is a Gaelic footballer who plays for the east Mayo club Charlestown Sarsfields. He played for the Mayo county team, until his retirement in 2021.

Parsons midfielder of note at the beginning of his county career. He broke onto the Mayo senior team in 2008, giving what was described as an 'inspirational' display against his native Sligo in the Connacht Senior Football Championship semi-final. He also performed well against eventual winners Galway in the Connacht final. Mayo were knocked out of the championship by Tyrone in the last round of the qualifiers.

Parsons also played for the Mayo side that the 2008 All-Ireland Under-21 Football Championship semi-final in 2008.

He was selected as part of the Ireland squad to play in the 2008 International Rules Series against Australia. some speculation that Parsons might consider signing a contract with an Australian Football League club, but he said that he had no interest in playing Australian rules.

Parsons was recalled to the Mayo senior team in 2020, dislocated his knee and ruptured ligaments and torn calf and hamstring in the 2018 Connacht Senior Football Championship match against Galway. He announced his retirement from inter-county football in January 2021, shortly after his teammates David Clarke and Donal Vaughan.

== Honours ==
- Connacht Senior Football Championship (4): 2009, 2014, 2015, 2020
- Connacht Under-21 Football Championship (3): 2007, 2008, 2009
- Connacht Senior Football Championship (1): 2009
- International Rules (1): 2008
