= Michael Plunkett =

Michael Plunkett is a Gaelic footballer who plays for Ballintubber and at senior level for the Mayo county team.
