= Mayo Gaels GFC =

Irish Gaelic football club

Mayo Gaels
- CLG Gael Maigh Eo
- Founded: 1975
- County: Mayo
- Colours: Blue, Yellow

Playing kits
Standard colours

Senior Club Championships
	All Ireland	Connacht champions	Mayo champions
Football:	0	0	0

Mayo Gaels is a Gaelic football club located in Mayo Abbey, County Mayo. The club was formed in 1975 and was entered in the championship. One of the club's greatest wins came in 1984 when Mayo Gaels won the Mayo Intermediate Football Championship.

== Achievements ==
- Mayo Intermediate Football Championship: 1984, 1998, 2021

== Current Players ==
- Ruairi Keane
- Liam Hughes
- Adam Gallagher
- Ethan Henry
- Jack Fallon
- James Jennings
