= Ballinrobe GAA =

Gaelic games club in County Mayo, Ireland

- CLG Baile an Roba
- Founded: 1887
- County: Mayo
- Colours: Maroon, Yellow
- Grounds: Flanagan Park

Playing kits
Standard colours

Ballinrobe GAA is a Gaelic Athletic Association club based in the town of Ballinrobe in south County Mayo, Ireland. The club participates in competitions organized by Mayo county board of the Gaelic Athletic Association.

== Achievements ==
- Mayo Senior Hurling Championship Winners (3) 1973, 1976, 1977
