= Pádraig O'Hora =

Irish Gaelic footballer

Pádraig O’Hora
Personal information
- Native name: Pádraig Ó hEaghra (Irish)
- Born: 1993 (age 32–33)
- Occupations: Community Liaison Officer; Youth Justice Worker

Sport
- Sport: Gaelic football
- Position: Corner-back
Club
- Years: Club
- Ballina Stephenites
Club titles
- Mayo titles: 2
Inter-county
- Years: County
- 2016 - 2017 2020 - 2024: Mayo
Inter-county titles
- Connacht titles: 2
- NFL: 1

Padraig O'Hora (Irish: Pádraig Ó hEaghra) is a Gaelic footballer who plays for Ballina Stephenites and at senior level for the Mayo county team.

O’Hora played minor and U-21 football for Mayo.

O’Hora joined the Mayo panel in 2016. He left the Mayo panel for three years before returning under James Horan's management.

He made his championship debut in 2020.

He stepped away from the Mayo panel for the 2025 season.

== Personal life ==
O’Hora works as a community liaison officer for the Mayo Mental Health Association and as a Youth Justice Worker for Youth Action Ballina.

He took part in RTÉ's ultimate hell week.

O’Hora has a keen interest in martial arts and has trained in jiu-jitsu, kickboxing and MMA.

On 20 May 2026, O’Hora was part of a three-man Irish team, the first since 2019 to summit Mount Everest, after a 47-day expedition. The trio brought the total number of Irish people to reach the summit to 68, and total number of Irish summits to 88.

== Honours ==
Inter-county

- Connacht Senior Football Championship (2): 2020, 2021
- National Football League (1): 2023

Club

- Mayo Senior Football Championship (2): 2023, 2024

2025
