= James Durcan =

Irish Gaelic footballer

Personal information
- Born: 27 September 1994 (age 32) Castlebar, Ireland
- Occupation: Student

Sport
- Sport: Gaelic Football
- Position: Forward
Club
- Years: Club
- Castlebar Mitchels
Inter-county
- Years: County
- 2018–: Mayo

James Durcan (born 27 September 1994) is an Irish Gaelic footballer for the Mayo senior team, who also plays club football for Castlebar Mitchels. Along with his twin brother Paddy, Durcan has appeared in both the 2014 All-Ireland Club SFC final and the 2016 All-Ireland Club SFC final with his club Castlebar Mitchels.

Durcan started his first senior game for the Mayo against Limerick in the 2018 All-Ireland Senior Football Championship and scored a goal against Tipperary, when he had originally intended his effort to score a point.

He got married in December 2024.
