= Breaffy =

Breaghwy Bréachmhaigh (Irish) Breaffy
- Village
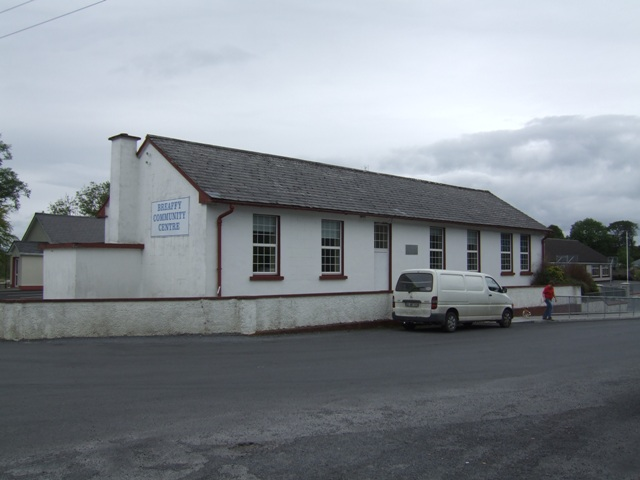
- Breaffy community centre

- Location in Ireland
- Coordinates: 53°50′45″N 9°14′13″W
- Country: Ireland
- Province: Connacht
- County: County Mayo
- Elevation: 49 m (161 ft)
- Irish Grid Reference: M202889

Breaffy, officially Breaghwy (/ˈbreɪfiː/; Irish: Bréachmhaigh, meaning 'wolf plain'), is a village in County Mayo, Ireland. It is 3.7km southeast of Castlebar, the county town. The village is in the townland and civil parish of Breaghwy.

== Village ==
The Shamrock Bar, a local pub, is adjacent to St. Aloysius' Roman Catholic Church. The current church was constructed in 1978, replacing a 19th-century structure. Across from the church is St. John's National School, which consists of the original 1890 school building, now serving as a community centre, and a modern facility developed since the 1990s that currently educates 308 pupils. The four-star Breaffy House Hotel is nestled in a wooded area on the outskirts of the village. The hotel was previously the home to the Browne family, the landlords of the area until the mid-20th century.

The village also features a 19th-century post office and schoolteachers residence, both of which are now disused. Breaffy also has a Gaelic Athletic Association pitch and team, Breaffy GAA.

== People ==
- Thomas Mullen, Fianna Fáil Teachta Dála (TD) for the Dublin County constituency from 1938 to 1943.
- Eugene Mullen, Fianna Fáil TD for the Mayo South constituency from June to September 1927.
- Aidan O'Shea, Gaelic footballer for Breaffy GAA and Mayo GAA.
- Seamus O'Shea, Gaelic footballer for Breaffy GAA and Mayo GAA.
- Rob Hennelly, Gaelic footballer for Breaffy GAA and Mayo GAA.
- Patrick Anthony Ludden, prelate.

== See also ==
- List of towns and villages in Ireland
