= Paddy Durcan =

Mayo Gaelic footballer

Personal information
- Native name: Pádraig Ó Dhuarcáin (Irish)
- Born: 27 September 1994 (age 32) Castlebar, Ireland
- Occupation: Student
- Height: 1.83 m (6 ft 0 in)

Sport
- Sport: Gaelic football
- Position: Right half-back
Club
- Years: Club
- Castlebar Mitchels
Club titles
- Mayo titles: 5
- Connacht titles: 2
Inter-county
- Years: County
- 2015–: Mayo
Inter-county titles
- Connacht titles: 3
- All-Irelands: 1
- NFL: 2
- All Stars: 1

Paddy Durcan (born 27 September 1994) is an Irish Gaelic footballer who plays for club football Castlebar Mitchels and for Mayo senior team. He has a twin brother named James. He is also a Senior Financial Planner.

== Club ==
With his club Castlebar Mitchels, Durcan played in both the 2013–14 and the 2015–16 All-Ireland Senior Club Football Championship.

== Mayo ==
In 2015 Durcan made his debut for Mayo.

Durcan started at left half-back in the 2016 All-Ireland Senior Football Championship final and again in the 2017 All-Ireland Senior Football Championship final, both against Dublin.

On 26 July 2026, Durcan won the 2026 All-Ireland Football Championship with Mayo, having been brought on as a substitute in the 65th minute.

== Career ==
Durcan is a Senior Financial Planner with SYS Financial.
