= 2020 Down county football team season =

Down county football team
2020 season
- Manager: Paddy Tally
- Stadium: Páirc Esler, Newry
- NFL D3: 2nd (promoted)
- All-Ireland SFC: Did not qualify
- Ulster SFC: Semi-finalist
- Dr McKenna Cup: Semi-finalist

The following is a summary of Down county football team's 2020 season, which was its 117th year. The season was suspended in March 2020 due to the COVID-19 pandemic. The season resumed in mid-October of the same year.

== Kits ==
Home	Away

== Competitions ==
Win Draw Loss Postponed/Cancelled

=== Dr McKenna Cup ===
The draw for the 2020 Dr McKenna Cup was made on 4 December 2019.

==== Fixtures ====
Date	Round	Home	Score	Away	Ground	Ref
29 December 2019	Group	Fermanagh	0-07 v 1-11	Down	Brewster Park, Enniskillen	
8 January 2020	Group	Down	2-17 v 0-15	Antrim	Páirc Esler, Newry	
12 January 2020	Semi-final	Tyrone	2-16 v 1-10	Down	Athletic Grounds, Armagh	

==== Table ====
Pos	Team	Pld	W	D	L	PF	PA	PR	Pts	Qualification
1	Down	2	2	0	0	37	21	1.762	4	Advance to semi-final
2	Antrim	2	1	0	1	28	36	0.778	2	
3	Fermanagh	2	0	0	2	20	28	0.714	0	

Updated to match(es) played on 8 January 2020. Source: Ulster GAA

==== Reports ====
29 December 2019
14:00
Group Stage

Fermanagh	0-07 - 1-11	Down
L Kerr (1-03), R McGarry (0-01), P Havern (0-03), J Flynn (0-01), C Poland (0-01), L Middleton (0-01), R Carr (0-01)	Report	R Jones (0-01), G Jones (0-01), C Jones (0-03), D McGurn (0-02)

Brewster Park, Enniskillen
8 January 2020
20:00
Group Stage

Down	2-17 - 0-15	Antrim
B O'Hagan (1-02), P Havern (0-05), C Quinn (1-03), D OHagan (0-02), L Kerr (0-02), D Hughes (0-01), C Maginn (0-01), D McGuinness (0-01)	Report	P McBride (0-06), E Fyfe (0-01), E Walsh (0-01), R McCann (0-03), C Duffin (0-02), A Loughran (0-02)

Páirc Esler, Newry
12 January 2020
14:00
Semi Final

Tyrone	2-16 - 1-10	Down
B Gallen (0-1), R McNamee (0-1), B McDonnell (0-1), F Burns (0-1), D McCurry (0-7), C McCann (1-2), R O'Neill (0-2), R McHugh (1-1)	Report	D O'Hagan (0-1), C Poland (0-3), C Quinn (1-0), S Dornan (0-1), P Havern (0-2), L Kerr (0-1), D O’Hare (0-1) R McGarry (0-1)

Athletic Grounds, Armagh

=== National Football League Division 3 ===
Down competed in Division Three for the 2020 National League season. Fixtures were published by the GAA on 26 November 2019.

On 12 March 2020, the GAA suspended the National League in mid-March due to the impact of the COVID-19 pandemic on Gaelic games. Games resumed in October 2020.

==== Fixtures ====
Date	Round	Home	Score	Away	Ground	Ref
Saturday 26 January	Group	Tipperary	0-10 v 0-10	Down	Clonmel GAA Ground, Clonmel	
Saturday 1 February	Group	Down	0-14 v 0-12	Derry	Páirc Esler, Newry	
Sunday 9 February	Group	Cork	0-16 v 1-08	Down	Páirc Uí Chaoimh, Cork	
Saturday 22 February	Group	Down	2-13 v 1-14	Longford	Páirc Esler, Newry	
Sunday 1 March	Group	Offaly	0-09 v 0-17	Down	O'Connor Park, Tullamore	
Saturday 14 March	Group	Down	P v P	Leitrim	Páirc Esler, Newry	
Sunday 22 March	Group	Louth	P v P	Down	Drogheda Park, Drogheda	
Saturday 17 October	Group	Down	C v C	Leitrim	Páirc Esler, Newry	
Sunday 25 October	Group	Louth	3-14 v 0-16	Down	Drogheda Park, Drogheda	

==== Table ====
Pos	Team	Pld	W	D	L	PF	PA	PD	Pts	Qualification or relegation
1	Cork (P)	7	7	0	0	132	90	+42	14	NFL Division 3 champions and promotion to 2021 NFL Division 2
2	Down (P)	7	4	1	2	87	87	0	9 (Note: Head-to-head result: Down 0-14 – 0-12 Derry.)	Promotion to 2021 NFL Division 2
3	Derry	7	4	1	2	110	95	+15	9	
4	Longford	7	3	1	3	96	90	+6	7 (Note: Head-to-head result: Longford 3-12 – 3-7 Tipperary.)	
5	Tipperary	7	3	1	3	99	104	−5	7	
6	Offaly	7	2	1	4	102	111	−9	5	
7	Leitrim (R)	7	1	1	5	90	109	−19	3	Relegation to 2021 NFL Division 4
8	Louth (R)	7	1	0	6	105	135	−30	2	Relegation to 2021 NFL Division 4

Updated to match(es) played on 25 October 2020. Source: GAA.ie
Rules for classification: 1) League points 2) Where only two teams are involved, the outcome of the meeting of the two teams in the competition 3) Scoring Difference 4) Highest Total Score For 5) A Play-Off.
(P) Promoted; (R) Relegated

==== Reports ====
26 January 2020
14:00
Round 1

Tipperary	0-10 - 0-10	Down
Conor Sweeney (0-05), Evan Comerford (0-02), Steven O'Brien (0-01), Jack Kennedy (0-01), Liam Boland (0-01)	Report	Donal O'Hare (0-03), Owen McCabe(0-02), Rory Burns (0-02), Barry O'Hagan (0-01), Cory Quinn (0-01), Pat Havern (0-01)

Clonmel GAA Ground, Clonmel
Referee: A Nolan (Wicklow)
1 February 2020
19:00
Round 2

Down	0-14 - 0-12	Derry
Conor Poland (0-01); Barry O’Hagan (0-02), Owen McCabe (0-01), Jerome Johnston (0-02), Cory Quinn (0-01), Donal O'Hare (0-06), Daniel Guinness (0-01)	Report	Shay Downey (0-01), Chrissy McKaigue (0-01), Benny Heron (0-01), Shane McGuigan (0-07, Alex Doherty (0-01), Christopher Bradley (0-01)

Páirc Esler, Newry
Referee: P Hughes (Armagh)
9 February 2020
14:00
Round 3

Cork	0-16 - 1-08	Down
Liam O'Donovan (0-01), Thomas Clancy (0-01), Tadhg Corkery (0-01), Ian Maguire (0-02), Brian Hartnett (0-01), Ruairí Deane (0-01), John O’Rourke (0-01); Damien Gore (0-03), Ciarán Sheehan (0-01), Cathail O'Mahony (0-03), Luke Connolly (0-01)	Report	Darren O'Hagan (0-02), Owen McCabe (0-02), Paul Devlin (0-01), Donal O’Hare (0-02), Jerome Johnston (1-01)

Páirc Uí Chaoimh, Cork
Referee: B Tiernan (Dublin)
22 February 2020
19:00
Round 4

Down	2-13 - 1-14	Longford
D O'Hagan (0-01), J Flynn (0-02), B O'Hagan (0-03), K McKernan (0-01), L Kerr (0-02), D O'Hare (0-02), C Quinn (1-02), J Guinness (1-00)	Report	P Collum (0-02), D Gallagher (0-05), D Reynolds (0-01), P Lynn (0-02), L Connerton (1-01), D Mimnagh (0-03)

Páirc Esler, Newry
Referee: C Reilly (Meath)
1 March 2020
14:00
Round 5

Offaly	0-09 - 0-17	Down
Eoin Carroll (0-1), Michael Brazil (0-1), Anton Sullivan (0-2), Bernard Allen (0-1), Ruairi McNamee (0-3), Aaron Leavy (0-1)	Report	James Guinness (0-3), Barry O'Hagan (0-6), Ceilum Doherty (0-1), Liam Kerr (0-3), Cory Quinn (0-2), Owen McCabe (0-1), Connaire Harrison (0-1)

O'Connor Park, Tullamore
Referee: J Bermingham (Cork)
17 October 2020
15:30
Round 6

Down	w/o - conc	Leitrim
	Report

Páirc Esler, Newry
25 October 2020
14:00
Round 7

Louth	3-14 - 0-16	Down
D Campbell 0-01, J Clutterbuck (0-01), T Durnin (0-01), B Duffy (0-01); L Jackson (0-01), C Keenan (1-01), C McKeever (1-00), S Mulroy (1-07, 0-06f)	Report	D Ward (0-02), R Johnston (0-04), P Devlin (0-06, 0-04f), B O’Hagan (0-04, 0-04f)

Dowdallshill, Dundalk
Referee: Martin McNally (Monaghan)

=== Ulster Senior Football Championship ===
The draw for the 2020 Ulster Senior Football Championship took place on 9 October 2019. On 26 November 2019, it was confirmed that Down would face Fermanagh on 24 May 2020. This date was then changed to 8 November due to the COVID-19 pandemic.

==== Fixtures ====
Date	Round	Team 1	Score	Team 2	Ground	Ref
8 November 2020	Quarter Final	Fermanagh	0-11 v 1-15	Down	Brewster Park, Enniskillen	
15 November 2020	Semi Final	Cavan	1-14 v 1-13	Down	Athletic Grounds, Armagh	

==== Bracket ====
Preliminary round
Monaghan	1–17
Cavan	2–15

Quarter-finals
Donegal	1–13
Tyrone	1–11
Derry	0–15
Armagh	0–17
Fermanagh	0–11
Down	1–15
Antrim	0–9
Cavan	0–13

Semi-finals
Donegal	1–22
Armagh	0–13
Down	1–13
Cavan	1–14

Final
Donegal	0–12
Cavan	1–13

==== Reports ====
8 November 2020
13:30
Quarter Final

Fermanagh	0-11 - 1-15	Down
C Corrigan (0-1) D McGurn (0-1), T Corrigan (0-6), D Teague (0-1), Jones (0-1), P McCusker (0-1)	Report	C Mooney (0-2), B O'Hagan (0-4), J Johnston (0-2), D O'Hare (1-4), C Quinn (0-1), R Johnston (0-2)

Brewster Park, Enniskillen
Attendance: 0
Referee: Barry Cassidy (Derry)
15 November 2020
13:30
Semi Final

Cavan	1-14 - 1-13	Down
P Faulkner (0-01), K Clarke (0-01), C Brady (0-01), K Brady (0-01), M Reilly (1-00 (pen), G McKiernan (0-03), T Galligan (0-03, 1m), S Smith (0-01), C Madden (0-03)	Report	P Delvin (0-03), J Johnston (0-04), D O'Hare (0-04), C Doherty (1-01), S Johnston (0-01)

Athletic Grounds, Armagh
Attendance: 0
Referee: M McNally (Monaghan)

=== All-Ireland Senior Football Championship ===
Due to the impact of the COVID-19 pandemic on Gaelic games, the GAA announced that there would be no back-door route into the All-Ireland Championship. Therefore, because Down did not win the Ulster Championship, they did not qualify for the 2020 All-Ireland Championship.
