= 2020 Cavan county football team season =

Cavan
2020 season
- Manager: Mickey Graham
- Home venue: Kingspan Breffni, Cavan
- NFL (Division 2): 7th (relegated)
- Ulster Championship: Winners
- All-Ireland Championship: Semi-finals
- Dr McKenna Cup: Group stage
First colours	Second colours

The following is a summary of the Cavan county football team's 2020 season.

== Dr McKenna Cup ==
The draw for the 2020 Dr McKenna Cup was made on 4 December 2019. Cavan were drawn in a group with Armagh and defending champions Tyrone.

Cavan finished bottom of their group, meaning they did not progress to a semi-final.

=== Table ===
Pos	Team	Pld	W	D	L	PF	PA	PR	Pts	Qualification
1	Tyrone	2	2	0	0	46	37	1.243	4	Advance to semi-final
2	Armagh	2	1	0	1	47	43	1.093	2	
3	Cavan	2	0	0	2	29	42	0.690	0	

Updated to match(es) played on 8 January 2020. Source: Ulster GAA

=== Results ===
29 December 2019 Round 1	Cavan	1–13 – 2–17	Armagh	Cavan
14:00	Martin Reilly 1–2 (1–0 pen, 0–1m), Conor Madden 0–3, Niall Murray 0–3 (0–1f), Conor Smith 0–2 (0–1m), Ryan Connolly 0–1 (0–1f), Bryan Magee 0–1, Liam Buchanan 0–1	Report	Conor Turbitt 2–2, Rían O'Neill 0–6 (0–5f), Oisín O'Neill 0–3, Aidan Nugent 0–3, Aidan Forker 0–1, Stefan Campbell 0–1, Jason Duffy 0–1	Stadium: Kingspan Breffni; Referee: Niall McKenna (Monaghan)

5 January 2020 Round 2	Tyrone	1–16 – 0–13	Cavan	Omagh
14:00	Darren McCurry 0–5 (0–4f), Conall McCann 1–1 (0–1m), Conn Kilpatrick 0–2, David Mulgrew 0–2, D. Kerr 0–2, Tiarnan McCann 0-2, Conall Grimes 0–1, Niall Sludden 0–1	Report	Niall Murray 0–4 (0–1f, 0–1m), Cian Madden 0–3, Martin Reilly 0–2, Ryan Connolly 0–2, Gearóid McKiernan 0–1 (0–1f), Oisín Kiernan 0–1	Stadium: Healy Park; Referee: Paul Faloon (Down)

== National Football League Division 2 ==
As a result of their relegation in 2019, Cavan competed in Division Two of the 2020 National League. The fixtures were released on 26 November 2019.

The National League was suspended on 12 March with five rounds played, due to the impact of the COVID-19 pandemic on Gaelic games. The competition resumed in October and all fixtures were completed.

Defeat to Roscommon on the final day meant Cavan were relegated for the second season in succession. They will compete in Division 3 in 2021.

=== Table ===
Pos	Team	Pld	W	D	L	PF	PA	PD	Pts	Qualification or relegation
1	Roscommon (P)	7	5	1	1	113	90	+23	11	NFL Division 2 champions and promotion to 2021 NFL Division 1
2	Armagh (P)	7	4	1	2	130	103	+27	9	Promotion to 2021 NFL Division 1
3	Kildare	7	4	0	3	106	99	+7	8	
4	Westmeath	7	3	1	3	106	111	−5	7 (Note: Head-to-head result: Westmeath 1-18 – 0-13 Laois.)	
5	Laois	7	3	1	3	104	113	−9	7	
6	Clare	7	3	0	4	90	99	−9	6 (Note: Head-to-head result: Clare 1-14 – 0-15 Cavan.)	
7	Cavan (R)	7	3	0	4	115	119	−4	6	Relegation to 2021 NFL Division 3
8	Fermanagh (R)	7	1	0	6	85	115	−30	2	Relegation to 2021 NFL Division 3

Updated to match(es) played on 24 October 2020. Source: GAA.ie
Rules for classification: 1) League points 2) Where only two teams are involved, the outcome of the meeting of the two teams in the competition 3) Scoring Difference 4) Highest Total Score For 5) A Play-Off.
(P) Promoted; (R) Relegated

=== Results ===
25 January 2020 Round 1	Armagh	2–18 – 1–8	Cavan	Armagh
19:00	Conor Turbitt 1–6 (0–1m), Stefan Campbell 1–2 (1–0 pen), Rory Grugan 0–3 (0–2f), Oisín O'Neill 0–3, Rían O'Neill 0–2 (0–2f), Aidan Forker 0–1, Niall Grimley 0–1	Report	Conor Madden 0–3, James Smith 1–0, Oisín Kiernan 0–1 (0–1f), Gearóid McKiernan 0–1 (0–1f), Bryan Magee 0–1, Conor Smith 0–1	Stadium: Athletic Grounds; Referee: Barry Cassidy (Derry)

1 February 2020 Round 2	Cavan	1–17 – 1–13	Westmeath	Cavan
19:00	Ciarán Brady 0–4, Chris Conroy 1–0, Raymond Galligan 0–2 (0–2 '45), Thomas Galligan 0–2, Padraig Faulkner 0–1, Killian Brady 0–1, Oisín Kiernan 0–1, Gearóid McKiernan 0–1, Oisin Pierson 0–1, Bryan Magee 0–1, James Smith 0–1, Stephen Murray 0–1, R. Connolly 0–1	Report	Luke Loughlin 1–3, John Heslin 0–4 (0–4f), Ray Connellan 0–2, Jack Smith 0–1, Ronan O'Toole 0–1, Callum McCormack 0–1, Lorcan Dolan 0–1	Stadium: Kingspan Breffni; Referee: Sean Laverty (Antrim)

16 February 2020 Round 3	Laois	1–6 – 3–10	Cavan	Portlaoise
14:00	Evan O'Carroll 0–3 (0–2f, 0–1 '45), Eoin Lowry 1–0, John O'Loughlin 0–2, Mark Barry 0–1 (0–1f)	Report	Stephen Murray 2–0, Evan Doughty 1–0, Bryan Magee 0–3 (0–1f, 0–1m), Gerard Smith 0–3, Oisin Pierson 0–3, Raymond Galligan 0–1 (0–1f)	Stadium: MW Hire O'Moore Park; Referee: Niall Cullen (Fermanagh)

22 February 2020 Round 4	Fermanagh	1–11 – 2–11	Cavan	Enniskillen
19:00	Conall Jones (0–3f), Ciaran Corrigan 0–3, Ultán Kelm 1–0, Ryan Jones 0–2, Eoin McManus 0–1 (0–1f), Aidan Breen 0–1, Shane McGullion 0–1	Report	Gearóid McKiernan 0–5 (0–1f), Thomas Galligan 1–1, Padraig Faulkner 1–0, Oisin Pierson 0–2 (0-2f), Oisín Kiernan 0–2, Chris Conroy 0–1 (0–1f)	Stadium: Brewster Park; Referee: Sean Hurson (Tyrone)

1 March 2020 Round 5	Cavan	0–15 – 1–14	Clare	Cavan
14:30	Oisin Pierson 0–7 (0–5f), Ciarán Brady 0–2, Oisín Kiernan 0–1, Gearóid McKiernan 0–1, Martin Reilly 0–1, James Smith 0–1, Bryan Magee 0–1, Stephen Murray 0–1	Report	Eoin Cleary 0–5 (0–3f), David Tubridy 0–4 (0–1f), Joe McGann 1–0, Ciaran Russell 0–1, Cian O'Dea 0–2, Pearse Lillis 0–1	Stadium: Kingspan Breffni; Referee: Jerome Henry (Mayo)

18 October 2020 Round 6	Kildare	1–21 – 0–20	Cavan	Newbridge
14:00	Jimmy Hyland 0–9 (0–5f), Darragh Kirwan 0–4, Kevin Flynn 0–3, Fergal Conway 1–0, Ben McCormack 0–2, Kevin Feely 0–1, Paul Cribbin 0–1, Liam Power 0–1	Report	Chris Conroy 0–8 (0–7f), Gearóid McKiernan 0–5 (0–2f), Cormac O'Reilly 0–2 (0–1m), Caoimhán McGovern 0–2, Conor Smith 0–2, Oisín Kiernan 0–1	Stadium: St Conleth's Park; Referee: Cormac Reilly (Meath)

24 October 2020 Round 7	Cavan	0–13 – 1–12	Roscommon	Cavan
14:00	Oisin Pierson 0–2 (0–2f), Ciarán Brady 0–2, Cormac O'Reilly 0–2, Raymond Galligan 0–1 (0–1f), Chris Conroy 0–1, Gearóid McKiernan 0–1, Oisín Kiernan 0–1, Martin Reilly 0–1, James Smith 0–1, Luke Fortune 0–1	Report	Donie Smith 0–7 (0–3f, 0–1 '45), Enda Smith 1–0, Ciaráin Murtagh 0–2 (0–1f), Cathal Cregg 0–1, Fintan Cregg 0–1, Diarmuid Murtagh 0–1	Stadium: Kingspan Breffni; Referee: Sean Hurson (Tyrone)

== Ulster Senior Football Championship ==
The draw for the 2020 Ulster Senior Football Championship was made on 9 October 2019, and pitted Cavan against Monaghan for the second successive year, with the winner facing Antrim in the quarter-finals.

The fixture was originally fixed for 10 May 2020. The game was later postponed due to the COVID-19 pandemic and was refixed for 31 October 2020.

=== Bracket ===
Preliminary round
Monaghan	1–17
Cavan	2–15

Quarter-finals
Donegal	1–13
Tyrone	1–11
Derry	0–15
Armagh	0–17
Fermanagh	0–11
Down	1–15
Antrim	0–9
Cavan	0–13

Semi-finals
Donegal	1–22
Armagh	0–13
Down	1–13
Cavan	1–14

Final
Donegal	0–12
Cavan	1–13

=== Results ===
31 October 2020 Preliminary Round	Monaghan	1–17 – 2–15 (a.e.t.)	Cavan	Clones
13:15	Conor McManus 1–4 (0–2f), Micheál Bannigan 0–2, Kieran Duffy 0–2, Rory Beggan 0–1 (0–1f), Dessie Ward 0–1, Fintan Kelly 0–1, Ryan McAnespie 0–1, Stephen O'Hanlon 0–1, Conor McCarthy 0–1, Shane Carey 0–1, Colin Walshe 0–1, Andrew Woods 0–1	Report	Martin Reilly 1–1, Gearóid McKiernan 0–3, Oisin Pierson 1–0, Luke Fortune 0–2, Stephen Smith 0–2, Niall Murray 0–1 (0–1m), Chris Conroy 0–1 (0–1 '45), Raymond Galligan 0–1 (0–1f), Gerard Smith 0–1, Oisín Kiernan 0–1, James Smith 0–1, Thomas Galligan 0–1	Stadium: St Tiernach's Park; Referee: Ciaran Branagan (Down)

7 November 2020 Quarter-final	Cavan	0–13 – 0–9	Antrim	Cavan
13:15	Thomas Edward Donohoe 0–3 (0–1f, 0–1m), Gearóid McKiernan 0–3 (0–1f), Ciarán Brady 0–2, Oisín Kiernan 0–2, Killian Clarke 0–1, Cormac Timoney 0–1, Oisin Pierson 0–1	Report	Paddy Cunningham 0–2 (0–1f), Conor Murray 0–2 (0–1m), Patrick McBride 0–1 (0–1f), Tomas McCann 0–1 (0–1f) Michael McCann 0–1, Kevin Quinn 0–1, Dermot McAlesse 0–1	Stadium: Kingspan Breffni; Referee: Paul Faloon (Down)

15 November 2020 Semi-final	Cavan	1–14 – 1–13	Down	Armagh
13:30	Gearóid McKiernan 0–3 (0–3f), Thomas Galligan 0–3 (0–1m), Conor Madden 0–3, Martin Reilly 1–0 (1–0 pen), Stephen Smith 0–1 (0–1f), Padraig Faulkner 0–1, Ciarán Brady 0–1, Killian Clarke 0–1, Killian Brady 0–1	Report	Jerome Johnston 0–5 (0–1f), Donal O'Hare 0–4 (0–1f), Paul Devlin 0–3 (0-2f), Ceilum Doherty 1–0, Shealan Johnston 0–1	Stadium: Athletic Grounds; Referee: Martin McNally (Monaghan)

22 November 2020 Final	Cavan	1–13 – 0–12	Donegal	Armagh
16:00	Conor Madden 1–2, Gearóid McKiernan 0–2 (0–2f), James Smith 0–2, Oisín Kiernan 0–2, Jason McLoughlin 0–1, Gerard Smith 0–1, Ciarán Brady 0–1, Thomas Galligan 0–1, Martin Reilly 0–1	Report	Paddy McBrearty 0–4 (0-2f), Niall O'Donnell 0–2, Caolan McGonagle 0–2, Ryan McHugh 0–1, Peadar Mogan 0–1, Michael Langan 0–1, Michael Murphy 0–1	Stadium: Athletic Grounds; Referee: Barry Cassidy (Derry)

== All-Ireland Series ==
After their Ulster final victory, Cavan progressed to their first All-Ireland semi-final in 23 years, where they faced five-time defending champions Dublin. Dublin ended Cavan's championship run with a 1–24 to 0–12 victory.

=== Bracket ===
Semi-finals
Cavan	0–12
Dublin	1–24
Mayo	5–20
Tipperary	3–13

All-Ireland final
Dublin	2–14
Mayo	0–15

=== Results ===
5 December 2020 Semi-final	Cavan	0–12 – 1–24	Dublin	Dublin
17:30	Martin Reilly 0–3, James Smith 0–2, Oisín Kiernan 0–2, G. McKiernan 0–1 (0–1f), Chris Conroy 0–1 (0–1f), Ciarán Brady 0–1, Thomas Galligan 0–1, Conor Madden 0–1	Report	Dean Rock 0–6 (0–2f), Robbie McDaid 1–2, Ciarán Kilkenny 0–4 (0–1m), Brian Fenton 0–4, Con O'Callaghan 0–4, Paddy Small 0–2 (0–1m), Brian Howard 0–1, Cormac Costello 0–1	Stadium: Croke Park; Referee: Ciaran Branagan (Down)
