= 2020 Armagh county football team season =

Armagh county football team
2020 season
- Manager: Kieran McGeeney
- Stadium: Athletic Grounds, Armagh
- NFL D2: 2nd (promoted)
- All-Ireland SFC: Did not compete
- Ulster SFC: Semi-finalist
- Dr McKenna Cup: Group Stage (2nd)

The following is a summary of Armagh county football team's 2020 season. The season was suspended in March 2020 due to the COVID-19 pandemic. The season resumed in mid-October of the same year.

== Competitions ==
Win Draw Loss Postponed/Cancelled

=== Dr McKenna Cup ===
The draw for the 2020 Dr McKenna Cup was made on 4 December 2019.

==== Table ====
Section C
Pos	Team	Pld	W	D	L	PF	PA	PR	Pts	Qualification
1	Tyrone	2	2	0	0	46	37	1.243	4	Advance to semi-final
2	Armagh	2	1	0	1	47	43	1.093	2	
3	Cavan	2	0	0	2	29	42	0.690	0	

Updated to match(es) played on 8 January 2020. Source: Ulster GAA

==== Ranking of section runners-up ====
Pos	Grp	Team	Pld	W	D	L	PF	PA	PR	Pts	Qualification
1	A	Monaghan	2	1	0	1	34	29	1.172	2	Advance to semi-final
2	C	Armagh	2	1	0	1	47	43	1.093	2	
3	B	Antrim	2	1	0	1	28	36	0.778	2	

Updated to match(es) played on 8 January 2020. Source: Ulster GAA

==== Reports ====
29 December 2019 Round 1	Cavan	1-13 (16) – (23) 2-17	Armagh	Cavan
14:00 GMT (UTC±0)				Venue: Breffni Park
		Report		Referee: Niall McKenna

8 January 2020 Round 3	Armagh	3-15 (24) – (27) 3-18	Tyrone	Armagh
20:00 GMT (UTC±0)				Venue: Athletic Grounds
		Report

=== National Football League Division 2 ===
Armagh competed in Division Two for the 2020 National League season. Fixtures were published by the GAA on 26 November 2019.

On 12 March 2020 the GAA suspended the National League in mid-March due to the COVID-19 pandemic. Games resumed in October 2020.

==== Fixtures ====
Competition	Home team	Home team score	Away team	Away team score	Link to report
NFL 2020 Round 1	Armagh	2-18	Cavan	1-08	Match Report
NFL 2020 Round 2	Laois	0-16	Armagh	0-10	Match Report
NFL 2020 Round 3	Armagh	0-16	Kildare	0-10	Match Report
NFL 2020 Round 4	Westmeath	3-12	Armagh	2-15	Match Report
NFL 2020 Round 5	Fermanagh	0-10	Armagh	3-14	Match Report
NFL 2020 Round 6	Armagh	0-15	Roscommon	3-10	Enter Link
NFL 2020 Round 7	Clare	1-13	Armagh	1-18	Enter Link

==== Table ====
Pos	Team	Pld	W	D	L	PF	PA	PD	Pts	Qualification or relegation
1	Roscommon (P)	7	5	1	1	113	90	+23	11	NFL Division 2 champions and promotion to 2021 NFL Division 1
2	Armagh (P)	7	4	1	2	130	103	+27	9	Promotion to 2021 NFL Division 1
3	Kildare	7	4	0	3	106	99	+7	8	
4	Westmeath	7	3	1	3	106	111	−5	7 (Note: Head-to-head result: Westmeath 1-18 – 0-13 Laois.)	
5	Laois	7	3	1	3	104	113	−9	7	
6	Clare	7	3	0	4	90	99	−9	6 (Note: Head-to-head result: Clare 1-14 – 0-15 Cavan.)	
7	Cavan (R)	7	3	0	4	115	119	−4	6	Relegation to 2021 NFL Division 3
8	Fermanagh (R)	7	1	0	6	85	115	−30	2	Relegation to 2021 NFL Division 3

Updated to match(es) played on 24 October 2020. Source: GAA.ie
Rules for classification: 1) League points 2) Where only two teams are involved, the outcome of the meeting of the two teams in the competition 3) Scoring Difference 4) Highest Total Score For 5) A Play-Off.
(P) Promoted; (R) Relegated

==== Reports ====
25 January 2020 1	Armagh	2-18 (24) – (11) 1-08	Cavan	Armagh
				Venue: Athletic Grounds
		Report		Referee: Barry Cassidy (Derry)

1 February 2020 3	Laois	0-16 (16) – (10) 0-10	Armagh	Portlaoise
18:00 UTC (UTC)				Venue: O'Moore Park
				Referee: Jerome Henry (Mayo)

8 February 2020 3	Armagh	0-16 (16) – (10) 0-10	Kildare	Armagh
19:00				Venue: Athletic Grounds
				Referee: David Coldrick (Meath)

23 February 2020 4	Westmeath	3-12 (21) – (21) 2-15	Armagh	Mullingar
				Venue: TEG Cusack Park
		Report		Referee: Barry Cassidy (Derry)

7 March 2020 5	Fermanagh	0-10 (10) – (23) 3-14	Armagh	Enniskillen
				Venue: Brewster Park
		Report		Referee: Ciaran Branagan (Down)

17 October 2020 6	Armagh	0-15 (15) – (19) 3-10	Roscommon	Armagh
				Venue: Athletic Grounds

24 October 2020 7	Clare	1-13 (16) – (21) 1-18	Armagh	Ennis
14:00 IST (UTC+1)				Venue: Cusack Park
				Referee: Derek O'Mahoney (Tipperary)

=== Ulster Senior Football Championship ===
The draw for the 2020 Ulster Senior Football Championship took place on 9 October 2019.

==== Fixtures ====
Ulster Quarter Final	Derry	0-15	Armagh	0-17	Enter Link

==== Bracket ====
Preliminary round
Monaghan	1–17
Cavan	2–15

Quarter-finals
Donegal	1–13
Tyrone	1–11
Derry	0–15
Armagh	0–17
Fermanagh	0–11
Down	1–15
Antrim	0–9
Cavan	0–13

Semi-finals
Donegal	1–22
Armagh	0–13
Down	1–13
Cavan	1–14

Final
Donegal	0–12
Cavan	1–13

==== Reports ====
BBC NI

1 November 2020
16:00 GMT (UTC+0)
Quarter-final

Report

Derry	0-15 (15) – (17) 0-17	Armagh
(HT: 0-5 – 0–11)
Pts: S McGuigan 7 (7f); N Loughlin 4 (3f); E Doherty 1, C McFaul 1, P Kearney 1, C McKaigue 1.		Pts: R O'Neill 4 (4f); R Grugan 3 (1f), J Clarke 3; A Forker 2, O O'Neill 2; C O'Neill 1, M Shields 1, J Óg Burns 1

Celtic Park, Derry
Referee: Sean Hurson (Tyrone)
Attendance: 0 (Note: The game was played behind closed doors due to the impact of the COVID-19 pandemic on Gaelic games.)

Sky Sports Mix

14 November 2020
13:15 GMT (UTC+0)
Semi-final

Report

Donegal	1-22 (25) – (13) 0-13	Armagh
(HT: 1-12 – 0-3)
Gls: P Mogan 1. Pts: M Langan 3, P Mogan 2, R McHugh 2, J Brennan 2, C McGonigle 2 (1m), C Thompson 2 (1f), N O’Donnell 2 (1m), M Murphy 2 (2f), EB Gallagher 1, H McFadden 1 (m), P McBrearty 1, O Gallen 1, A McClean 1		Pts: R O’Neill 7 (6f, 1x’45′), J Clarke 2, C Turbitt 2 (1m), O O’Neil 1, N Grimley 1 (1m).

Breffni Park, Cavan
Referee: David Coldrick (Meath)
Attendance: 0

=== All-Ireland Senior Football Championship ===
Due to the impact of the COVID-19 pandemic on Gaelic games, the GAA announced that there would be no back-door route into the All-Ireland Championship. Therefore, because Armagh did not win the Ulster Championship, they did not qualify for the 2020 All-Ireland Championship.
