= 2020 Laois Senior Football Championship =

Laois S.F.C.
- Season: 2020
- Champions: Portarlington (13th S.F.C. Title)
- Relegated: Arles–Kilcruise
- Winning Captain: Keith Bracken
- Winning Manager: Martin Murphy
- Matches: 35

The 2020 Laois Senior Football Championship was the 130th edition of the Laois GAA's premier club Gaelic football tournament for senior graded teams in County Laois, Ireland. The championship consisted of 16 teams and had a back-door format for the first two rounds before proceeding to a knock-out format. A team to lose two matches was knocked out of the championship.

Portlaoise were the defending champions after they defeated Killeshin in the previous years final.

Rosenallis returned to the senior grade after claiming the 2019 I.F.C. title.

The final, not played until 15 August 2021 because of the impact of the COVID-19 pandemic on Gaelic games, was won by Portarlington who claimed their first title since 2001 beating Graiguecullen in the final by 1–15 to 0–7.

Arles–Kilcruise were relegated to the intermediate grade for 2021 following their relegation play-off final loss to Courtwood. This ended their 21-year stay in the top flight of Laois club football since claiming the 1999 Laois Intermediate Club Football Championships.

== Team changes ==
The following teams have changed division since the 2019 championship season.

=== To S.F.C. ===
Promoted from 2019 I.F.C.

- Rosenallis – (Intermediate Champions)

=== From S.F.C. ===
Relegated to 2020 I.F.C.

- Cretyard

== Round 1 ==
All 16 Teams In

== Round 2 ==
=== Round 2A ===
The 8 winners from Round 1 enter this round. The 4 winners from this round will enter the draw for the quarter-finals, while the 4 losers will play in Round 3.

=== Round 2B ===
The 8 losers from Round 1 enter this round. The 4 winners from this round will go into Round 3, while the 4 losers will enter the Relegation Playoffs.

== Round 3 ==
The 4 losers from Round 2A enter this round and play the 4 winners from Round 2B. The 4 winners from this round will go into the draw for the quarter-finals.

== Quarter-finals ==
The quarter-finals will eliminate four teams, leaving 4 teams. These teams will face off against each other in the semi-finals.

== Semi-finals ==
In the semi-finals, two further teams will be eliminated, leaving the best from each set to play each other in the Final.

== Final ==
The remaining two teams play against each other to determine the champion.
