= John Horan (sports administrator) =

Irish sports administrator (born 1958)

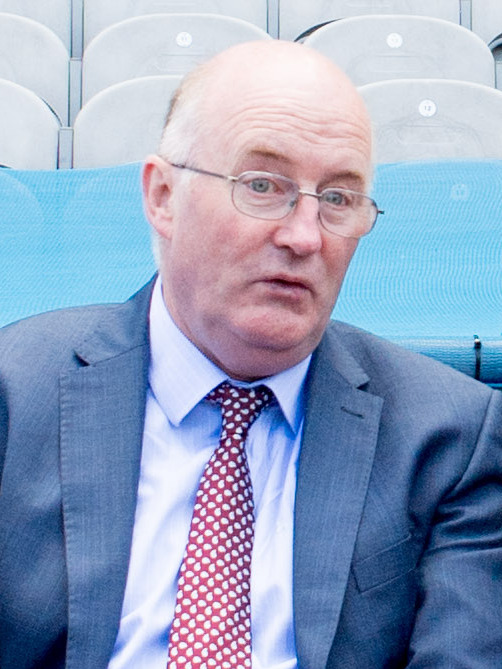
- Horan in June 2018

President of the Gaelic Athletic Association
- In office 24 February 2018 – 27 February 2021
- Preceded by: Aogán Ó Fearghail
- Succeeded by: Larry McCarthy

Personal details
- Born: 1958 (age 67–68) Dublin, Ireland
- Occupation: Retired Secondary school principal

John Horan (born 1958) is a Gaelic games administrator who served as 39th president of the GAA. He was chairman of the Leinster Council from 2014 to 2017 and was previously vice-chairman from 2011 to 2014. A member of the Na Fianna club in Glasnevin, Horan was the first Dublin-born GAA president since 1924 when Daniel McCarthy finished his three-year term. He is a retired secondary school principal.

He was educated at St. Vincent's C.B.S., Glasnevin, where he also was a teacher and principal. His pupils included Dessie Farrell and Jason Sherlock.

In 2019, Horan unveiled a new manifesto and mission statement for the GAA entitled The GAA: Where We All Belong.

The GAA became the first national sporting Association in Ireland to establish a gender diversity committee. In June 2019, Horan approved the first ever official participation by the GAA in the national Dublin PRIDE Parade. This was following meetings with referee David Gough and Ladies Gaelic Footballer Valerie Mulcahy.

A significant development in his tenure occurred at a GAA Special Congress held at Páirc Uí Chaoimh in Cork on 20 October 2019, where delegates voted in favour of the introduction of a second tier Gaelic Football Championship. This led to the creation of the Tailteann Cup, first staged in 2022 and won by Westmeath.

On 29 January 2019 he delivered the first ever address to the Senate or Seanad Eireann by a GAA President. Other notable firsts included an address at an ecumenical service celebrating Gaelic games in St Patrick's Cathedral in Dublin on 26 May 2019.

== GAA and COVID-19 ==
The latter part of his presidency was dominated by the COVID-19 pandemic.

In March 2020 he approved the use of Croke Park stadium as a COVID-19 testing center.

Horan supported a new match programme calendar for Gaelic games that proposed a definite period for the elite inter-county game and a separate window for the club fixtures at local level. Due to the impact of the COVID-19 pandemic on Gaelic games, mass gatherings at sporting events were prohibited. the GAA was forced to introduce this model in 2020 to allow its Championships to be played and the split season would later become permanent in 2022.

On 21 November 2020 Horan led the GAA in their centenary commemoration of the Bloody Sunday attack on Croke Park by Crown Forces which resulted in the deaths of 14 innocent people. Horan laid a wreath at the spot where Tipperary footballer Michael Hogan was fatally shot. President of Ireland Michael D Higgins, Taoiseach Micheal Martin and GAA Director General Tom Ryan also laid wreaths in an empty Croke Park due to COVID-19 restrictions.

The Pandemic restrictions also prevented supporters from being present at the 2020 All-Ireland finals and meant that Horan presented the Liam MacCarthy Cup to Limerick hurling captain Declan Hannon and the Sam Maguire Cup to Dublin Gaelic football captain Stephen Cluxton in an empty Croke Park that would normally have 82,300 in attendance.

Sporting positions
Preceded by Aogán Ó Fearghail	President of the Gaelic Athletic Association; 2018–2021	Succeeded by Larry McCarthy
