= 2021 GAA Congress =

The 2021 GAA Congress was held on 27 February. Due to the COVID-19 pandemic, it took place virtually, a first in the history of the Gaelic Athletic Association. The public could also watch it live.

The conference marked the formal transition of the presidency from John Horan to Larry McCarthy. McCarthy, based with New York, became the first overseas president.

All motions discussed at the conference passed, while a further ten were delayed with the intention of discussing them when delegates could gather in the same room. The motions passed were effective four weeks from the date of the 2021 Congress.

== Congress motions ==
Several motions attracted media coverage on various grounds.

A motion on the "split-season" of competitions involving clubs and county teams passed without a vote due to the high volume of support, setting the All-Ireland finals at a date of mid-July from 2022 and allowing clubs to then play their competitions until the end of October. Four days later, the Club Players Association announced that it had voted to dissolve itself as it had achieved the objective it had been campaigning for since 2017.

A so-called "sin-bin" to counter cynical play was introduced for a trial period in hurling, though representatives from Galway and Limerick opposed. The Gaelic Players Association had asked in advance that the motion not be discussed at all. 61% voted in favour of the motion. The rule, as passed, would be applied differently in hurling (with a yellow card issued to the offending player) than in football where a black card was already in force.

The concussion substitute rule was made similar to the blood rule.

Any effort to distract an opponent with the wave of a hurley or arm as he sets himself to take a puck-out or kick-out was made a foul.

A player called up to his county team was required for the first time to have taken a special anti-doping course within the previous year or he would be suspended for one game.

Joint-captains, which had crept into the game over the previous decade, were no longer permitted to both raise a trophy.

Teams participating in senior and intermediate championships at county level were set at a maximum of 16 by 2023. Delegates from Dublin, Galway and Tyrone were among those to oppose this motion.

For the first time, teams were permitted to field 13 players at the beginning of a game's second half without being obliged to forfeit the match.

The maor foirne role was abolished. Delegates from Kilkenny and Limerick had opposed the motion.

The All-Ireland Junior Football Championship was brought back.

The All-Ireland Under-20 Hurling Championship semi-finals were abolished. Instead, the winning teams from the Leinster Under-20 Hurling Championship and the Munster Under-20 Hurling Championship advanced to the final.

Another motion passed to prevent hurlers from playing with both senior and under-20 county teams, as was already the case in football.

Dates were set to conclude Post Primary School GAA competitions (17 March), the Sigerson Cup (by the seventh Sunday of the year) and the Fitzgibbon Cup (by the eighth Sunday of the year).
