= Impact of the COVID-19 pandemic on Gaelic games =

As with other sports, the COVID-19 pandemic caused disruption to Gaelic games, primarily in Ireland but also elsewhere in the world. Competitions were cancelled, postponed or restructured, while some teams were withdrawn or were unable to participate in those competitions that went ahead.

The sports (football, hurling, camogie, and ladies' football) saw all competitions suspended from 12 March 2020. The National Hurling League, National Football League, National Camogie League and Ladies' National Football League, which were all running at the time, were suspended, with competitions not intended to resume until 29 March at the earliest. This proved to be an optimistic assumption.

The 2020 Football and Hurling Leagues, as well as a revised 2020 All-Ireland Senior Football Championship and 2020 All-Ireland Senior Hurling Championship were completed rapidly (and behind closed doors) between October and December of that year, in the period corresponding roughly to the gap between the second and third waves of the pandemic. London and New York were forced out of the football by the pandemic, the English-based teams missed the hurling. The Sligo county football team missed the 2020 championship due to an outbreak. The 2020 Camogie and Ladies' Leagues were cancelled.

The 2021 National Hurling League and 2021 National Football League were delayed when a third wave of the pandemic struck Ireland, infecting more people in the month of January 2021 than in the entirety of 2020.

== Timeline ==
=== 2020 ===
==== March ====
- 12 March – following Taoiseach Leo Varadkar's 12 March announcement from Washington, the Gaelic Athletic Association (GAA), alongside the Irish Rugby Football Union (IRFU) and Football Association of Ireland (FAI) all immediately announced the two-week suspension of games.
- 13 March – Ireland's Minister for Health Simon Harris said people returning from Spain or Italy would have to "not quite self-isolate" but "restrict their movements" upon returning to Ireland; this affected the Tipperary county hurling team, the reigning All-Ireland Champions, who had flown in advance to the Costa Blanca in Spain for a training camp. Tim Floyd, Secretary of the Tipperary County Board, also contracted the virus but recovered.
- 17 March
  - The GAA confirmed that the opening fixture of the 2020 All-Ireland Senior Football Championship, due to have taken place at Gaelic Park in The Bronx on 3 May, had been postponed.
  - Michael Carton, the former Dublin hurler who won the 2013 Leinster Senior Hurling Championship, revealed he had been in hospital since the previous weekend after testing positive for COVID-19.
- Four-time All-Ireland football winning manager Seán Boylan also contracted COVID-19 at around this time and was in hospital until 31 March, according to an interview he gave on RTÉ Radio the following January.
- 18 March – the GAA confirmed that its Féile na Gael 2020 hurling and camogie event (jointly to have been hosted by Dublin, Kildare and Meath in early June), Féile na nÓg National football tournaments (jointly to have been hosted by Donegal, Derry, and Tyrone in late June), the Celtic Challenge under-17 hurling development competition and every event intended to have involved academy squads, would be cancelled in 2020 as a result of the damage done by the virus to its other competitions.
- 30 March – the Irish Independent reported that Ard Stiúrthóir Tom Ryan had told employees through a conference call that their wages would be reduced by between 10 and 20% for the month of April; the GAA confirmed the following day that the report was accurate.

==== April–May ====
- 7 April
  - That morning, the former Offaly county football team manager, Fr Tom Scully, who led the team to the 1969 All-Ireland Senior Football Championship Final, died in Dublin of COVID-19.
  - Other GAA figures reported to have been infected by the virus around this time included Club Aontroma Chairman Niall Murphy (who narrowly survived) and Ulster Camogie Chairman Jennifer Cultra.
- 29 April – the administrator Noel Walsh (i.e. "Mr Clare Football") died of pneumonia resulting from COVID-19.
- 13 April – the All-Ireland winning hurler Jonathan Glynn announced that himself and his fiancée had tested positive for COVID-19 in the United States, where he was working as a coach with the New York team, but both had isolated for two weeks and recovered.
- 14 April (the day after the Easter Monday public holiday) – the GAA announced that—following the government's Good Friday three-week extension of restrictions—the 2020 All-Ireland Senior Football Championship and 2020 All-Ireland Senior Hurling Championship would be postponed "until further clarity on the current situation is available. However, it is the Association's view that it is highly unlikely these will be rescheduled any time before the beginning of July, at the earliest". The Ulster GAA also announced the immediate cancellation of the Ulster Club football leagues, the Buncrana Cup (under-16 Football League) and the Ulster Minor Football League. The Ulster Minor Football Championship was changed to mirror the fixtures of the 2020 Ulster Senior Football Championship, so that both competitions could be played together if a suitable date arose. The Leinster GAA announced that both the Leinster Minor Football Championship and Leinster Minor Hurling Championship would be run as knock-out competitions if they were to occur at all.
- 17 April – a remote Special Congress occurred, the outcome of which granted the GAA emergency powers to change competition structures to respond to the pandemic (such rule changes would normally be decided at an Annual Congress).
- 30 April – the GAA confirmed wage cuts for staff would continue into May and June.
- 6 May – the GAA announced that it expected no inter-county matches would take place until October at the earliest and asked all counties to cease preparations until 20 July, while unveiling a COVID-19 Advisory Group whose members included Pat O'Neill.
- 11 May – that night, the COVID-19 Advisory Group had its first meeting (online).
- Antrim football captain Declan Lynch told a newspaper in late May that he had experienced a mild form of COVID-19, from which the BBC said he had recovered by June.

==== June–September ====
- 5 June – the GAA's COVID-19 Advisory Group unveiled details of a four-phase "Return to Play" roadmap.
- 12 June – the various sporting organisations unveiled details of a COVID-19 education programme for clubs. As part of this a "COVID supervisor" would monitor every team at each club.
- 26 June – that morning, the GAA announced that all inter-county competitions would commence in October 2020, with the football championship to feature a knock-out format for the first time since 2000, while the hurling championship reverted to an open draw (made later that evening) and retained the possibility of a second chance for losing teams. The GAA opted not to reschedule the New York Connacht championship game and postponed its proposed new Tailteann Cup competition until 2021.
- 9 July – that night, the GAA's management committee updated match regulations ahead of the resumption of club games, restricting the number of substitutes and officials and introducing water breaks (one in each half).
- By late July, small numbers of spectators were permitted into games on both sides of the border.
- 23 August – Wexford GAA club Shelmaliers defeated Naomh Éanna to win the first County Championship to be completed since the discovery of COVID-19.
- 12 September
  - The GAA announced that the emergency administrative powers agreed in April had been extended until 4 December.
  - London withdrew from playing in the remaining league and championship fixtures.
- 19 September – Donegal GAA announced that one of its county footballers had tested positive for an asymptomatic case of COVID-19. The players were tested just before the squad began training for the resumption of inter-county play, with one positive result returned. The rest of the squad entered isolation. Among those to praise the decision to make public the result was Monaghan player Darren Hughes. Two months later, Conor Morrison spoke of receiving a COVID-19 test in advance of surgery on a long-term leg injury in Santry on a Monday morning in September, with a positive result received that night (matching descriptions in reports at that time, he was also asymptomatic); Morrison, however, said he had not been in contact with other members of the county team (the injury having occurred during a game for his club St Eunan's the previous month) but his surgery had to be postponed until October and he had had to isolate.

==== October–December ====
- 2 October – the Armagh county football team suspended training after several COVID-19 positive tests within the squad.
- 5 October
  - The PSNI launched an investigation after receiving reports of inadequate social distancing between spectators at the Derry Senior Football Championship final, held on 4 October after being moved to an alternative ground due to a rise in COVID-19 cases close to the original venue. Cork GAA also addressed an absence of social distancing on streets in South Cork after Blackrock won the Senior Hurling Championship for the first time since 2002.
  - The GAA, in a decision endorsed by the Ladies' Gaelic Football Association (LGFA), suspended all club fixtures with immediate effect on 5 October, stating: "In particular, post-match celebrations and a lack of social distancing at certain events have proved disappointing and problematic. This directive applies to all ages and all grades across the island". Later that day, the Government of Ireland excluded spectators from all games under new restrictions that applied those then in effect in Dublin and Donegal to the rest of the country (this did not affect counties north of the border where limited numbers were still permitted to attend). Any remaining club fixtures were postponed until the respective county's inter-county season had finished.
- 7 October – the Fermanagh county football team suspended training after several COVID-19 positive tests within the squad, and the decision was also taken to suspend the activity of the county hurlers and minor footballers, as well as the training of club players which was still permitted following the GAA directive of two days previously.
- 15 October – Wexford GAA confirmed four of its senior footballers and two of its senior hurlers had tested positive for COVID-19.
- 17 October – league and championship resumed (see that section for further details).
- 24 October – In an article published in the Irish Examiner on this date, Clare footballer David Tubridy confirmed that he and his father Tommy had recently tested positive for COVID-19.
- 3 November – Sligo withdraw from the Connacht championship.
- 15 November – in his Sunday Independent column published on this date, Colm O'Rourke wrote that the former Cork player and manager Billy Morgan had recently been seriously ill after contracting COVID-19.
- 30 November – Deputy Chief Medical Officer Ronan Glynn told a press briefing that evening that the GAA was not at fault for the virus's resurgence in Ireland.
- 13 December – 2020 All-Ireland Senior Hurling Championship Final
- 19 December – 2020 All-Ireland Senior Football Championship Final

=== 2021 ===
==== January–March ====
- 1 January – the GAA gave advice on which activities were permitted under the restrictions which had been imposed following increased COVID-19 transmission over the Christmas period, i.e. individual training but no collective training, no club games and no access to club grounds.
- 5 January – GAA director general (Ard Stiúrthóir) Tom Ryan issued a letter to county secretaries barring county teams from collective training for at least the rest of the month and also stating that club and county gyms should be shut until further notice. Collective training had originally been scheduled to resume on 15 January. However, Ronan McCarthy's Cork county football team were filmed earlier that month training on a beach in Youghal, "crawling on their elbows and lumping logs above their heads", as described in The Irish Times. McCarthy was later given a twelve-week ban and Cork lost a home league fixture, while Down county football team manager Paddy Tally and his team received the same punishment for a similar breach of the collective training ban. Tally's ban was reduced to eight weeks on appeal, effective immediately and meaning it would expire on 5 April before any games were expected to occur. Tally later explained that this was the first such session, intended to introduce new players to the team's running programme, and that managers of other teams had been asking about the possibility of challenge matches. McCarthy also appealed his twelve-week ban but was unsuccessful. He then appealed it again in March and was also unsuccessful. He appealed it in April too and, again, was unsuccessful.
- 22 January – the GAA denied reports it intended go ahead with intentions to redevelop the Cusack Stand at Croke Park, citing the pandemic as the cause.
- 1 February
  - The GAA postponed its draws to determine the opening fixtures of the 2021 All-Ireland Senior Football Championship and 2021 All-Ireland Senior Hurling Championship.
  - Following a meeting the previous evening, the GAA further delayed its decision on when to allow county teams to resume collective training.
- 10 February – the GAA announced that there would be no county team activity (i.e. training or games) until Easter Day (4 April) at the earliest.
- 16 February – the GAA announced a record loss of €34.1 million for the financial year ending 31 October 2020, contrasting with 2019 profits of €8 million, with half of its 2020 funding being provided by government.
- 27 February – the 2021 GAA Congress was held online (a first in GAA history) and marked the formal transition of the presidency from John Horan to Larry McCarthy. Horan issued a message in the last monthly GAA Newsletter of his presidency for the organisation's membership to assist if they could with the deployment of COVID-19 vaccines.
- 12 March – one year since the GAA first suspended its activities due to the pandemic.
- Weekend of 18/19 March – a Central Council meeting approved a GAA management committee decision to extend its special emergency powers until 21 May and the GAA cancelled its customary membership deadline of 31 March for the year 2021 due to the pandemic.
- 22 March – that evening, a 5 pm meeting of the GAA's COVID-19 Advisory Group endorsed a request by Ulster GAA officials for young and adult players north of the border to return to training from 12 April as would be permitted for sports there. The GAA later clarified that county teams would not be permitted to train collectively there, only clubs.
- 26 March – the Irish Examiner published the results of a Freedom of Information request which revealed that Government informed the GAA on 24 December that senior inter-county games were permitted but then brought forth legislation taking away the "Level 5 exempted sports" entitlement of senior inter-county games on 31 December, a decision which the National Public Health Emergency Team (NPHET) had no part in. The GAA was not informed of this decision and only discovered it when its then president John Horan asked Jack Chambers during a video conference call on 8 February. The timing of the 24 December assurance also appeared to contradict public comments by Chambers that the senior inter-county game exemption expired after the 2020 All-Ireland Senior Football Championship Final, which had by then taken place.

==== April ====
Disciplinary record of suspensions given to team officials
Offender	Role	Offence	Punishment issued by
Three Mayo county football team backroom personnel	Unclear	Unauthorised presence in Croke Park during the 2020 All-Ireland Senior Football Championship Final	Mayo County Board
Ronan McCarthy	Cork county football team manager	Breach of GAA's collective training ban	GAA
Paddy Tally	Down county football team manager	Breach of GAA's collective training ban	GAA
Dessie Farrell	Dublin county football team manager	Breach of Level 5 Government restrictions---- Breach of GAA's collective training ban	Dublin County Board
Séamus McEnaney	Monaghan county football team manager	Breach of Level 5 Government restrictions---- Breach of GAA's collective training ban	Monaghan County Board

- 1 April – the Irish Independent published photographs of a coach-led group of Dublin county football team members, including All Stars Footballer of the Year Brian Fenton, whom it reported had gathered at Innisfails GAA club before 7 am on the previous morning. The session occurred around 12 hours after the GAA sent a note to each club and county, warning that any club or county team ignoring the collective training ban could risk putting the GAA's intentions to return to action "in serious jeopardy". The GAA immediately appealed to other counties not to behave as the Dublin football team had, i.e. breaking a GAA rule but, more seriously, breaching the Government's Level 5 restrictions then in place to counter the public health crisis. Apart from minister Jack Chambers, other politicians to criticise the transgression included Alan Dillon, the MEP (and former GAA president) Seán Kelly and former Taoiseach Enda Kenny. Former Meath football manager Seán Boylan, who had been seriously ill with COVID-19 the previous year, also said he "baffled and shocked". The date of the publication (April Fools' Day) and the seriousness of the transgression in contrast to the Dublin team's previous reputation led to much confusion about whether it could really have occurred. However, that evening, after investigating the accuracy of the report, Dublin GAA suspended its own football team manager Dessie Farrell for 12 weeks with immediate effect, matching the earlier ban that the GAA had issued to Cork football team manager Ronan McCarthy, with the GAA earlier announcing an investigation that would lead to further possible punishment. Irish Independent journalist Colm Keys noted that Dublin's transgression "has happened against the backdrop of public health advice. Such a scenario wasn't clear back in early January [the time of the McCarthy incident] when it wasn't clear that GAA teams had lost that elite status. The assumption was still there that an elite group could train".
- 4 April – former Dublin camogie team manager Frank Browne called for Dessie Farrell's resignation as Dublin county football team manager for the "arrogance" of his team's behaviour, adding: "I think it's a cop out to say they're amateur players. We're all amateur players involved in the GAA, we all know right from wrong and it was wrong".
- 6 April – the GAA warned in its April newsletter against any further collective training ban breaches by teams, stating that the transgression of the Dublin footballers and public attention the incident had received in recent days had "brought the spotlight on our Association".
- 8 April
  - The Irish Independent reported that Minister for Justice Helen McEntee had received photographic evidence and video footage of Monaghan county football team players collectively training in late March and thus breaching the COVID-19 Level 5 restrictions. Minister McEntee sent the details to both the Garda Síochána and Croke Park. The incident occurred at Corduff GAA club near Carrickmacross and members of the county's management team were implicated. The Department of Justice confirmed that it had received the information and passed it on to the Garda Síochána, the GAA and the Department of Health. Gardaí launched an enquiry into the matter.
  - Monaghan GAA suspended Séamus McEnaney for 12 weeks after the team manager admitted involvement in breaching the Level 5 restrictions and said it would comply with a GAA investigation into the incident.
  - Minister Jack Chambers told RTÉ: "My officials from the Department of Sport have been in touch with the GAA to reemphasise that all breaches undermine the broader public health messaging". Tomás Ó Sé said on RTÉ Radio 1: "The big difference between Cork and Down earlier in the season compared to Dublin and Monaghan is that the Dublin and Monaghan issues happened on GAA grounds". Former GAA president Seán Kelly said: "It's terrible to see it happening, officially organised, in a GAA club, by a county team... Saying you can't start training until two or three weeks after other counties would be a good place to start" as an additional punishment, he said.
  - GAA president Larry McCarthy said the GAA's reputation had been damaged by the recent breaches of Level 5 restrictions.
  - The GAA released its revised fixtures calendar. The leagues were set to begin on 8 May. The football championship was scheduled as a straight knockout for a second consecutive year, London and New York's participation in the Connacht Senior Football Championship again deemed impossible.
- 12 April – clubs north of the border were permitted to resume collective training, which had been banned since the previous October.
- 13 April
  - It was announced that the draws for the championship would occur on Monday 19 and Tuesday 20 April. They did.
  - Cork, Down and Dublin were given no home National Football League games as punishment for their training misbehaviours.
- 16 April – the GAA revealed renewed guidelines ahead of the return to collective training for county teams, scheduled for the following week.
- 19 April – squads involved in inter-county competition were officially allowed to train collectively for the first time in four months.
- 26 April – the reopening of pitches and permission for young players to train with their clubs.

==== May–December ====
- 4 May – Minister Jack Chambers confirmed that non-playing members of county team panels would be permitted to be present at games in the upcoming National Leagues.
- 8 May – the 2021 National Hurling League began (see that section for further details).
- 15 May – the 2021 National Football League began (see that section for further details).
- 25 May – the GAA announced that an attendance of 500 would be let in to National League fixtures north of the border from the following weekend, the first allowance of spectators at inter-county matches since 8 March 2020.
- 21 June – the first pilot test fixture at Croke Park occurred, a league game between Derry and Offaly.
- 26 June – the 2021 All-Ireland Senior Hurling Championship and 2021 All-Ireland Senior Football Championship began (see that section for further details). On the same day Sligo return to the Connacht championship but easily beaten by Mayo.
- 3 July – 8,000 were allowed into Croke Park for the 2021 Leinster Senior Hurling Championship semi-finals.
- August – the 2021 All-Ireland Senior Football Championship semi-final between Kerry and Tyrone, and the 2021 All-Ireland Senior Football Championship Final between Mayo and Tyrone were twice delayed due to COVID-19 within the Tyrone squad.
- 27 November – the draw for 2022 All-Ireland Senior Football Championship took place, and included London and New York.
- 31 December – the 2022 McGrath Cup opening game between Clare and Waterford was postponed, with Waterford unable to field a team due to COVID-19 cases and contacts.

=== 2022 ===
- 5 January – the 2022 O'Byrne Cup opening round game between Meath and Wicklow was called off, with Wicklow infected by COVID-19.
- 13 January – the 2022 O'Byrne Cup fixture game between Carlow vs Westmeath was postponed too.
  - London played a first inter-county game since March 2020.
- May – both London and New York returned to the All-Ireland Senior Football Championship for the first since 2019.
- 2020's Leinster and Munster Senior Hurling Championship round-robin games were rescheduled for the season.
- 6 July – the GAA confirmed a change of referee to Barry Cassidy for the inaugural Tailteann Cup final. The original referee Maurice Deegan was absent for what would have been his final inter-county game after contracting COVID-19.

=== 2023 ===
- 13 January - O'Byrne Cup games between Carlow vs Laois & Wexford vs Louth were both cancelled.
- 7 May – As Galway host Sligo in the Connacht final it's rescheduled of the Connacht semi-final postponed in 2020.
- 21 October – First Ireland vs Scotland since 2019 was played.

=== 2024 ===
- 7 and 8 September - newspaper reports on plans to bring back Ireland vs Australia or Railway Cup.
- 12 October - As the 2025 GAA football championship draws were held London and New York Connacht Quarter finals of 2020 those were postponed between Roscommon vs London and Galway vs New York were included.
- 18 and 19 October Railway Cup is back for the first time since 2017.

=== 2025 ===
- 5 April - As Roscommon played London in the Connacht football championship rescheduled what was postponed in 2020.
- 6 April - As Galway played New York in the Connacht football championship rescheduled what was postponed in 2020.
- 9 September - A Connacht council meeting is held for 2026 cancelled Connacht championship games in 2021 between Mayo vs London and Roscommon vs New York will be expected to finally take place.
- 27 November - The draw of the 2026 Connacht football championship takes place with fixtures Mayo vs London and Roscommon vs New York featured on the draw for the first time since 2016 didn't feature on 2021 draws.

=== 2026 ===
- 11 April - After not being held in 2021 Mayo finally played London in the Connacht football championship.
- 12 April - After not being held in 2021 Roscommon finally played New York in the Connacht football championship.
- 17 October- First return of Ireland vs Australia to take place in 2027.

== Impact on competitions ==
=== Club ===
Status of incomplete 2020 Senior Football & Hurling Championships
SFC	Completed in 2020?	Date played in 2021
Carlow		8 August
Cork		19 June
Donegal		14 August
Laois		15 August
Longford		29 August
Waterford		?
SHC	Completed in 2020?	Date played in 2021
Kildare		?
Laois		?
Meath		8 August
Offaly		?

On 26 June, the GAA announced its decision to cancel the 2020 Provincial and All-Ireland Club Championships, which had taken place annually since 1971, due to the need to "build in a rest period for people".

On 4 July, shortly after clubs resumed contact training, Kilkenny GAA club James Stephens announced it had ceased all activity for one week after one of its hurlers tested positive for COVID-19; he had by then recovered.

In mid-July, three GAA clubs in West Cork (Argideen Rangers, Ballinascarthy and Oliver Plunketts) suspended their activities due to uncertainty whether its members had had contact with someone found to have COVID-19. The Agrideen Rangers chairman later informed RTÉ Sport that each of the club's players had subsequently tested negative.

On 12 July, a member of Dublin GAA club Man-O-War tested positive for COVID-19 and Cork GAA club Glanworth confirmed that a player had tested positive; both clubs suspended activities.

On 14 July, Down GAA club Atticall became the first GAA club based in Ulster to confirm a member had tested positive for COVID-19; the club suspended activities until 19 July at the earliest even though the GAA said it could continue. On 16 July, two Derry GAA clubs (Banagher and Craigbane) suspended all activities as a precautionary measure; they were joined by eight others (Ardmore, Claudy, Drum, Drumsurn, Foreglen, Glack, Limavady and Magilligan) the following day after a cluster of COVID-19 emerged in the Limavady area, in the north of the county. The nearby Donegal GAA club Naomh Colmcille followed suit on 18 July, having played Glack in a challenge match the previous weekend. Donegal GAA later clarified that it had not asked Naomh Colmcille to suspend activities, though it respected the club's decision.

On 21 July, two Tyrone GAA clubs (Aghaloo O'Neills and Eglish St Patrick's) suspended their activities after an Eglish player, who had played in a league game between the clubs the previous weekend, tested positive for COVID-19; the entire Eglish squad then required testing to determine the presence or absence of the virus. Eglish's other players were permitted to resume activities on 24 July.

On 23 July, Armagh GAA club Killeavy and Down GAA club Longstone suspended activities with one player from each club having tested positive for COVID-19. By 24 July, four other Killeavy players had tested positive for COVID-19.

On 28 July, Donegal GAA club Naomh Conaill suspended activities while it awaited the outcome of a test result.

On 18 August, Sligo GAA club Eastern Harps suspended activities as a precaution due to possible contact with a COVID-19 case.

Dublin GAA club Clanna Gael Fontenoy forfeited a Dublin Junior Hurling Championship quarter-final against Ballyboden St Enda's due to be played on the morning of 23 August after the denial of an attempt at postponement following a COVID-19 positive test in the Ballyboden team.

On 22 September, Donegal GAA postponed the Donegal Senior Football Championship final until 7 October after a player tested COVID-19 positive. The game had initially been set to proceed but was then postponed. On 26 September, Longford GAA postponed the Longford Senior Football Championship semi-finals and the Longford Intermediate Football Championship final due to the detection of COVID-19 cases. On 26 September, Leitrim GAA postponed the Leitrim Intermediate Football Championship final due to COVID-19 issues. A Galway Intermediate Football Championship semi-final was rescheduled at short notice when a player was informed that he had been a close contact of a COVID-19 case. On 1 October, South Kerry GAA postponed 4 October's South Kerry Senior Football Championship final due to a COVID-19 issue.

On 2 October, Armagh GAA suspended all club activity due to an increase in COVID-19 cases in the area.

The Waterford Intermediate Football Championship final on 4 October featured a Dungarvan player who later tested COVID-19 positive and appeared for his club while awaiting the result of his test.

After club games were suspended on 5 October, and the switch made to inter-county, many counties had not completed their competitions – the following senior finals went unplayed in 2020: the Cork Senior Football Championship, Donegal Senior Football Championship and Waterford Senior Football Championship, the Kildare Senior Hurling Championship, Laois Senior Hurling Championship, Meath Senior Hurling Championship and Offaly Senior Hurling Championship, while the following senior semi-finals went unplayed in 2020: the Carlow Senior Football Championship, Laois Senior Football Championship and Longford Senior Football Championship, as well as other competitions at intermediate and junior levels.

By the first anniversary (12 March 2021) of the GAA's first suspension of activities, club players had been permitted to play for only around three of the previous twelve months.

In May 2021, Wexford GAA clubs Shelmaliers and Faythe Harriers suspended all club activity due to the possibility of infection with COVID-19, with the St Martin's club later doing likewise after one of their players tested positive for COVID-19.

=== Inter-county ===
Teams in the top flight of the 2021 NFL as demonstrating part of the plan to divide the league in a bid to limit COVID contagion.
Red: North section; Green: South section.

==== 2020 league and championship ====
The pandemic's arrival coincided with the playing of the National Leagues. Play was suspended from 12 March 2020. Ahead lay the 133rd All-Ireland Championships in football and hurling, annual competitions with an unbroken run stretching back to 1887. Though often delayed due to such incidents as outbreaks of polio and foot-and-mouth disease, the All-Ireland Championships had never previously been cancelled, even during the two World Wars. Following an interview given by GAA president John Horan on The Sunday Game on 10 May, RTÉ described "the prospect of a fallow GAA year" as "very possible".

On 12 September, the GAA announced it would formally go ahead with the year's All-Ireland Football and Hurling Championships at senior, under-20 and minor levels from October after receiving a promise of government funding to help stage the events. Ulster GAA confirmed ahead of the 2020 Ulster Senior Football Championship that the final would not be held at its traditional venue of St Tiernach's Park due to the absence of floodlights. The Athletic Grounds in Armagh was chosen instead.

On 25 September, the GAA announced details of its rescheduled remaining fixtures in the National Football League and National Hurling League, to resume on the weekend of 17–18 October. Ahead of the resumption, the GAA denied suggestions it would cancel the competitions, though it had cancelled the League finals. Donegal's footballers travelled the round-trip of 900 kilometres to Tralee in their own cars to play Kerry, a feat described in the Irish Independent as the "most eye-catching example of GAA expeditions in the Covid era". 17 Fermanagh footballers were out for the resumption, ten COVID-19 positive and seven others self-isolating. One of those who tested positive, Aidan Breen, spoke publicly about his experience as Fermanagh unsuccessfully attempted to have their first league game postponed. With a "number of players... awaiting test results", Leitrim were unable to field a football team and conceded their opening fixture to Down, the first team forced to do so. On 13 October, the Moycullen club withdrew its panel members on the Galway county football team after a COVID-19 outbreak there shortly after that club won its first Galway Senior Football Championship. On 20 October, Longford GAA conceded their next football fixture, away to Cork, their manager Padraic Davis calling it a "dead rubber" (as Cork had previously secured promotion to Division 2) and both teams were scheduled to begin their championship campaigns the following weekend. Longford's concession meant they surrendered an outside possibility of promotion and instead caused the promotion of Down. Down's promotion was also assisted by the points secured following Leitrim's concession of their previous fixture. On 21 October, it was reported that a Roscommon footballer had tested COVID-19 positive. The team vowed to fulfil their fixture against Cavan, however. On 22 October, Waterford GAA indicated it would concede its football fixture against Antrim due to the deteriorating health crisis north of the border. Antrim suggested it instead concede home advantage and play the fixture in Dundalk, an offer which Waterford accepted.

Also on 22 October, the entire Offaly county hurling team were ruled as close contacts of a COVID-19 positive player they had trained alongside, forcing the county to concede that weekend's 2020 Christy Ring Cup game against Kildare. On 23 October, Sligo GAA announced that a player on the Sligo county hurling team had tested COVID-19 positive, meaning the team could not play Derry in the Christy Ring Cup that weekend.

On 5 November, the Sligo county football team were forced to withdraw from the 2020 Connacht Senior Football Championship due to COVID-19, meaning their opponents Galway went straight into the final.

On 8 November, Mark Keane of Collingwood Football Club (one of several players whose return to Ireland during the close of the Australian rules football season coincided with the delayed All-Ireland and provincial competitions) was brought on as a substitute for Cork against Kerry in the 2020 Munster Senior Football Championship. He scored the late goal that knocked Kerry out of the competition, in what was described as "one of the biggest upsets in recent championship history... a strike so late it had eerie echoes of Tadhg Murphy's 1983 goal at the same end of the ground that similarly put Kerry out of the championship". On 22 November, Colin O'Riordan (another of those who had returned to Ireland during the close of the Australian rules football season) played for Tipperary against Cork in the 2020 Munster Senior Football Championship Final, winning a senior provincial medal in his first game for his county in five years. Sydney Swans also gave O'Riordan permission to play in the All-Ireland semi-final against Mayo. Three members of the Mayo backroom team were each suspended for three months after attending the 2020 All-Ireland Senior Football Championship Final "without accreditation".

Both the Sam Maguire Cup and the Liam MacCarthy Cup, the premier football and hurling trophies, were withheld from 2020's winning teams to discourage crowds gathering and no homecoming celebrations were permitted.

Following a sudden reintroduction of restrictions (announced on Christmas Eve and taking effect after the public holiday), the inter-county minor and under-21 championships, specifically in Leinster and Ulster, came to a halt once more. Roscommon did manage to win the Connacht Minor Football Championship on Saint Stephen's Day though, after Kerry had won the Munster Minor Football Championship. 12 games at minor and under-20 level went unplayed in 2020.

==== 2021 league and championship ====
The 2021 National Football League was regionalised to facilitate limited travel, with (for instance) Division 1 North consisting of Donegal, Tyrone, Monaghan and Armagh. This plan had been hinted at as early as September 2020. However, all games were indefinitely delayed due to the deteriorating health crisis south of the border in early 2021.

It was decided in December 2020 that New York would return to the Connacht Senior Football Championship in 2022, rather than 2021, and decided on London's delayed return on 8 April 2021. In 2022 Sligo hosted New York, Leitrim hosted London the opposite way in 2023. The 2019 fixtures were repeated in 2024.

On 19 and 20 April 2021, the draws for the 2021 championships took place afresh. Instead of usual October or November draws over the years.

The delayed 2021 National Hurling League began on 8 May, while the National Football League began on 15 May.

On 19 May, Wexford GAA's chairman told South East Radio that two members of the Wexford county hurling team, who had played in the league win over Clare at Cusack Park a few days earlier, had separately tested positive for COVID-19. This came ahead of the scheduled league fixture against Kilkenny that weekend, with betting suspended in some cases due to uncertainty over whether the game would occur and all the other Wexford hurlers being tested for COVID-19. The Kilkenny game was postponed on 22 May after a third Wexford hurler tested positive for COVID-19 on 21 May, with public health advice referring to the possibility of the virus circulating among the other players. The game was later rescheduled. There were then doubts over the rescheduled fixture when a Kilkenny hurler tested positive for COVID-19 but the game went ahead. Two of the Clare hurlers became involved in the original Wexford incident when identified as close contacts of the first two Wexford hurlers who had contracted COVID-19, leading to them being deemed ineligible for the team's next league match away to Laois at O'Moore Park. As a result a dispute arose between Wexford GAA and the Clare hurling manager, Brian Lohan. Clare GAA supported their manager. On 27 May, Wexford GAA confirmed that none of its other players had since tested positive for COVID-19 and that training would recommence.

On 30 May, immediately after a four-point loss to Dublin in the last round of the 2021 National Football League in Tuam resulted in Galway having to contest a relegation play-off to stay in Division 1, Galway manager Pádraic Joyce expressed his annoyance upon learning that their opponent Monaghan would receive home advantage. "I'm just after being told it is away because they had no home games and we had two home games — so they are being rewarded for breaking a curfew and I find that unbelievable", Joyce said, in reference to the Séamus McEnaney-sanctioned COVID-19 breach which both the Minister for Justice Helen McEntee and the Garda Síochána had been alerted to the previous month. He added: "It's a joke, if you ask me, and I don't know how Croke Park came up with that solution to play in Monaghan... I think it disrespects the whole system and the whole Allianz League if you are going rewarding a county to get a home vital game when you broke the rules". Monaghan won by a single point (scored in the 94th minute of the game) and Galway were relegated.

In July, meetings were held to move both the Connacht SFC Final from Castlebar and the Ulster SFC Final from Clones to Croke Park.

=== College ===
The 2020 Sigerson Cup and 2020 Fitzgibbon Cup were both played to completion, two of the few competitions unaffected that year as they had been played in January and February.

On 13 January 2021, the GAA confirmed that the year's Sigerson and Fitzgibbon Cups had been cancelled due to pandemic restrictions.

=== School ===
The final of the 2020 MacRory Cup, due to have been played between St Colman's College, Newry and St Patrick's College, Maghera on 17 March, was postponed. After an unsuccessful effort to play the match on 7 October, the game was cancelled and the trophy shared between the finalists.

The 2020 Corn Uí Mhuirí was ? The 2020 Connacht Colleges Senior Football Championship was also abandoned. The 2020 Leinster Colleges Senior Football Championship was completed.

The pandemic also affected the 2020–21 season, with (for instance) no schools or college games occurring during November 2020.

14 January 2021 brought confirmation that the Hogan Cup and the Dr Croke Cup would not be played for in 2021, though the possibility of competitions at provincial level was retained.

The morning of 25 February 2021 brought confirmation that Munster post-primary school competitions would not occur in 2021. Later that day, the other three provinces followed suit.

=== International ===
The UK government did not permit London GAA clubs to resume contact training until the evening of 25 August.

London, Warwickshire and Lancashire were excluded from the 2020 All-Ireland Senior Football and Hurling Championships. They were also excluded from the 2021 All-Ireland Senior Football and Hurling Championships.

Irish players based in the Australian Football League (AFL), including Conor McKenna, returned home following the suspension of play there. In addition, the AFL announced on 5 April that they would not be travelling to Ireland for the planned International Rules Series in November 2020 due to the disruption that the virus had caused to their season.

Conor McKenna returned to Melbourne when the 2020 AFL season resumed. On 20 June, McKenna became the sport's first COVID-19 case when he returned a low-level positive result. After a particularly negative reaction from the local media, and a failure to replicate the initial result, McKenna returned home and resumed his football career with Tyrone. He made an immediate impact on his debut against Donegal and in his second game scored two goals that helped relegate Mayo, in what was that county's first time to be knocked out of the top flight in 23 years.

On 11 May, the Camanachd Association issued a statement that it had agreed in consultation with the GAA to cancel the 2020 Shinty-Hurling International Series between Ireland and Scotland, scheduled for October.

By May 2020, Gaelic games administrators in France (where most players—particularly in Brittany—are French natives and the French language is common) had concluded that, with the stricter lockdown in force there and the government's announcement that mass gatherings would not be permitted before September, their 2020 championship could not occur. The French finals had been scheduled for Bordeaux.

After the disruption of early 2021, clubs in England resumed full contact training in late March 2021 but clubs in Scotland and Wales had not joined them by then.
