= Larry McCarthy (sports administrator) =

Gaelic games administrator

- Labhrás Mac Carthaigh
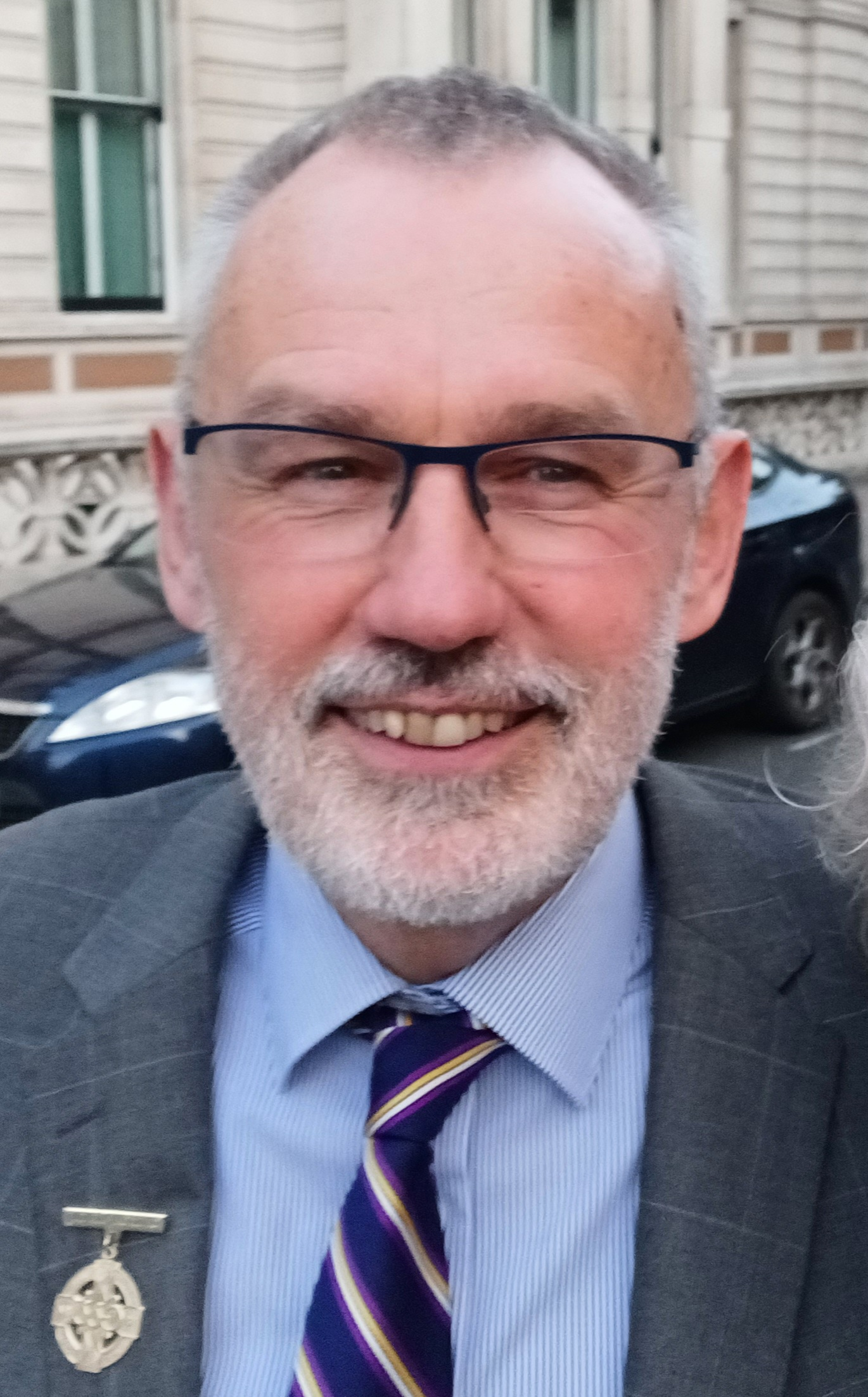
- McCarthy in 2022

President of the Gaelic Athletic Association
- In office 27 February 2021 – 24 February 2024
- Preceded by: John Horan
- Succeeded by: Jarlath Burns

Personal details
- Born: 17 September 1954 (age 71) Bishopstown, Cork, Ireland
- Occupation: University lecturer

Larry McCarthy (Irish: Labhrás Mac Carthaigh; born 1954) is a Gaelic games administrator who served as president of the GAA from 2021 to 2024. A native of Bishopstown, in Cork city, he is a member of the Sligo football club in New York and has served with New York GAA in a number of capacities, including secretary, chairman and Central Council delegate.

== Career ==
He is a university lecturer by profession, working at the Stillman School of Business at Seton Hall University in New Jersey since 1998.

At the GAA Congress in 2018, he was elected as one of the GAA's trustees while he was also part of the Strategic Review Committee during the same year under the stewardship of John Horan. Previously, he sat on the Towards 150 Committee under Aogán Ó Fearghail. He served on the Central Council for three years and was a member of the GAA Finance Committee. He became president-elect of the GAA in February 2020, the first overseas person to do so. He formally became president at the 2021 GAA Congress, held remotely due to COVID-19 restrictions. He flew into Ireland and isolated himself in Dublin (this being before quarantine was strictly enforced) ahead of formally taking on the presidency, during which he is based in Dublin.

== Personal life ==
McCarthy received his secondary education at Coláiste Éamann Rís (formerly Deerpark) in Cork city. He attended Thomond College of Education for his Bachelor's Degree, has a Master's Degree from New York University, and a Ph.D. from Ohio State University. He is married to Barbara, from Malahide, County Dublin, and together they have two grown sons.

Sporting positions
| Preceded by John Horan | President of the Gaelic Athletic Association; 2021–2024 | Succeeded by Jarlath Burns |
