= 2020 National Football League (Ireland) =

Gaelic football competition

League details
- Dates: 25 January – 25 October 2020
- Teams: 32

League champions
- Winners: Kerry (21st win)
- Captain: David Clifford
- Manager: Peter Keane

League runners-up
- Runners-up: Dublin
- Captain: Stephen Cluxton
- Manager: Dessie Farrell

Other division winners
- Division 2: Roscommon
- Division 3: Cork
- Division 4: Limerick

The 2020 National Football League, known for sponsorship reasons as the Allianz National Football League, is the 89th staging of the National Football League (NFL), an annual Gaelic football tournament for Gaelic Athletic Association county teams. Thirty-one county teams from the island of Ireland, plus London, compete. Kilkenny do not participate.

The league was originally scheduled to end in March 2020, but the public health measures introduced to combat the spread of the COVID-19 pandemic resulted in the final two league rounds being delayed to October. In June 2020 the GAA announced that the league finals would not be played with the division winners being determined by table position at the end of the league rounds. This was only the second NFL season to be decided without a final (the first was in 1935–36).

The GAA announced a new broadcast agreement on 10 January 2019 that runs from 2019 until 2022. Eir Sport and RTÉ provide live TV coverage of the league on Saturday nights. TG4 broadcast Sunday afternoon games. The highlights programmes are RTÉ2's League Sunday on Sunday evenings, TG4's GAA 2019 on Monday evenings and Eir Sport's Allianz Leagues Reloaded on Wednesday evenings.

London withdrew after Round 6 due to the impact of the COVID-19 pandemic on Gaelic games. A meeting was held on 12 September.

On 24 October, Kerry became the Division 1 champions, with 11 points from their seven games.

== Format ==
=== League structure ===
In the top division, Division 1, teams compete to become the National Football League (NFL) champions. The top two teams qualify for the NFL Final, with the winners crowned NFL champions. The 2020 National Football League consists of four divisions of eight teams. Each team plays every other team in its division once. Two points are awarded for a win and one point for a draw.

Teams compete for promotion and relegation to a higher or lower league. In Divisions 2, 3 and 4, the first and second-places teams are promoted, while the bottom two teams of divisions 1, 2 and 3 are relegated. There is no relegation from Division 4.

=== Tiebreakers for league ranking ===
As per the Official GAA Guide - Part 1 - Section 6.21:

If two teams in the same group are equal on points on completion of the league phase, the following tie-breaking criteria are applied:

1. Where two teams only are involved - the outcome of the meeting of the two teams in the previous game in the Competition;

If three or more teams in the same group are equal on points on completion of the league phase, the following tie-breaking criteria are applied:

1. Scoring Difference (subtracting the total scores against from total scores for);
2. Highest Total Score For;
3. A Play-Off.

In the event that two teams or more finish with equal points, but have been affected by a disqualification, loss of game on a proven objection, retirement or walkover, the tie shall be decided by the following means:

1. Score Difference from the games in which only the teams involved, (teams tied on points), have played each other. (subtracting the total Scores Against from total Scores For)
2. Highest Total Score For, in which only the teams involved, have played each other, and have finished equal in (i)
3. A Play-Off

== Division 1 ==
Locations of the 2020 NFL Division 1 teams

=== Table ===
Pos	Team	Pld	W	D	L	PF	PA	PD	Pts	Qualification
1	Kerry (C)	7	5	1	1	133	112	+21	11	National Football League champions
2	Dublin	7	4	2	1	126	112	+14	10	
3	Galway	7	4	0	3	128	127	+1	8 (Note: Head-to-head result: Galway 2-25 – 0-12 Tyrone.)	
4	Tyrone	7	4	0	3	109	126	−17	8	
5	Donegal	7	3	1	3	117	109	+8	7	
6	Monaghan	7	2	2	3	113	114	−1	6	
7	Mayo (R)	7	2	1	4	122	123	−1	5	Relegation to 2021 NFL Division 2
8	Meath (R)	7	0	1	6	103	128	−25	1	Relegation to 2021 NFL Division 2

Updated to match(es) played on 24 October 2020. Source: GAA.ie
Rules for classification: 1) League points 2) Where only two teams are involved, the outcome of the meeting of the two teams in the competition 3) Scoring Difference 4) Highest Total Score For 5) A Play-Off.
(C) League champions; (R) Relegated

==== Round 1 ====
25 January 2020 1	Dublin	1-19 (22) – (22) 1-19	Kerry	Drumcondra, Dublin
19:15 GMT (UTC+0)				Venue: Croke Park
		Report		Referee: Sean Hurson (Tyrone); Attendance: 42,502

25 January 2020 1	Donegal	0-19 (19) – (19) 2-13	Mayo	Ballybofey
19:15 GMT (UTC+0)				Venue: MacCumhaill Park
		Report		Referee: David Coldrick (Meath)

26 January 2020 1	Tyrone	1-14 (17) – (12) 1-09	Meath	Omagh
14:00 GMT (UTC+0)				Venue: Healy Park
		Report		Referee: Joe McQuillan (Cavan)

26 January 2020 1	Galway	1-14 (17) – (16) 0-16	Monaghan	Salthill
14:30 GMT (UTC+0)				Venue: Pearse Stadium
		Report		Referee: Maurice Deegan (Laois)

==== Round 2 ====
1 February 2020 2	Kerry	1-15 (18) – (17) 2-11	Galway	Tralee
19:00 GMT (UTC+0)				Venue: Austin Stack Park
		Report		Referee: Anthony Nolan (Wicklow)

1 February 2020 2	Mayo	0-08 (08) – (14) 1-11	Dublin	Castlebar
19:00 GMT (UTC+0)				Venue: MacHale Park
		Report		Referee: Barry Cassidy (Derry)

2 February 2020 2	Monaghan	1-12 (15) – (11) 0-11	Tyrone	Castleblayney
14:00 GMT (UTC+0)				Venue: St Mary's Park
		Report		Referee: David Gough (Meath)

2 February 2020 2	Meath	0-07 (07) – (17) 3-08	Donegal	Navan
15:30 GMT (UTC+0)				Venue: Páirc Tailteann
		Report		Referee: Conor Lane (Cork)

==== Round 3 ====
8 February 2020 3	Dublin	1-15 (18) – (18) 1-15	Monaghan	Drumcondra, Dublin
19:00 GMT (UTC+0)				Venue: Croke Park
				Referee: Ciaran Branagan (Down)

9 February 2020 3	Meath	2-05 (11) – (12) 1-09	Mayo	Navan
14:00 GMT (UTC+0)				Venue: Páirc Tailteann
				Referee: Sean Hurson (Tyrone)

9 February 2020 3	Tyrone	0-14 (14) – (13) 0-13	Kerry	Edendork
14:00 GMT (UTC+0)				Venue: Páirc Arthur Mallon
				Referee: Fergal Kelly (Longford)

9 February 2020 3	Donegal	2-07 (13) – (14) 2-08	Galway	Letterkenny
15:00 GMT (UTC+0)				Venue: O'Donnell Park
		Report		Referee: Joe McQuillan (Cavan)

==== Round 4 ====
22 February 2020 4	Dublin	1-15 (18) – (17) 1-14	Donegal	Drumcondra, Dublin
19:00 GMT (UTC+0)				Venue: Croke Park
		Report		Referee: Maurice Deegan (Laois); Attendance: 26,153

23 February 2020 4	Kerry	1-19 (22) – (19) 2-13	Meath	Killarney
13:00 GMT (UTC+0)				Venue: Fitzgerald Stadium
				Referee: Derek O'Mahoney (Tipperary)

23 February 2020 4	Galway	2-25 (31) – (12) 0-12	Tyrone	Salthill
14:00 GMT (UTC+0)				Venue: Pearse Stadium
				Referee: Conor Lane (Cork)

23 February 2020 4	Monaghan	2-16 (22) – (13) 0-13	Mayo	Clones
14:00 GMT (UTC+0)				Venue: St Tiernach's Park
				Referee: Anthony Nolan (Wicklow)

==== Round 5 ====
29 February 2020 5	Tyrone	1-10 (13) – (10) 1-07	Dublin	Omagh
19:15 GMT (UTC+0)				Venue: Healy Park
				Referee: Cormac Reilly (Meath)

1 March 2020 5	Mayo	1-13 (16) – (17) 1-14	Kerry	Castlebar
13:30 GMT (UTC+0)				Venue: MacHale Park
				Referee: Martin McNally (Monaghan)

1 March 2020 5	Donegal	2-12 (18) – (08) 0-08	Monaghan	Ballyshannon
14:00 GMT (UTC+0)				Venue: Fr Tierney Park
		Report		Referee: David Coldrick (Meath)

1 March 2020 5	Meath	1-12 (15) – (17) 1-14	Galway	Navan
14:30 GMT (UTC+0)				Venue: Pairc Tailteann
				Referee: Niall Cullen (Fermanagh)

==== Round 6 ====
17 October 2020 6	Monaghan	0-14 (14) – (17) 0-17	Kerry	Inniskeen
14:00 IST (UTC+1)				Venue: Páirc Grattan
				Referee: Barry Cassidy (Derry)

17 October 2020 6	Dublin	1-20 (23) – (19) 0-19	Meath	Donnycarney, Dublin
19:00 IST (UTC+1)				Venue: Parnell Park
				Referee: Brendan Cawley (Kildare); TV: eir Sport

18 October 2020 6	Galway	0-17 (17) – (32) 3-23	Mayo	Salthill
14:00 IST (UTC+1)				Venue: Pearse Stadium
				Referee: Maurice Deegan (Laois); TV: TG4

18 October 2020 6	Donegal	2-17 (23) – (19) 2-13	Tyrone	Ballybofey
16:00 IST (UTC+1)				Venue: MacCumhaill Park
				Referee: Jerome Henry (Mayo); TV: TG4

==== Round 7 ====
24 October 2020 7	Kerry	2-18 (24) – (10) 0-10	Donegal	Tralee
14:00 IST (UTC+1)				Venue: Austin Stack Park
		Report		Referee: Conor Lane (Cork); TV: eir Sport

25 October 2020 7	Galway	0-15 (15) – (21) 2-15	Dublin	Salthill
14:00 GMT (UTC+0)				Venue: Pearse Stadium
				Referee: David Coldrick (Meath); TV: TG4

25 October 2020 7	Mayo	1-19 (22) – (23) 3-14	Tyrone	Castlebar
14:00 GMT (UTC+0)				Venue: MacHale Park
				Referee: Niall Cullen (Fermanagh)

25 October 2020 7	Monaghan	2-14 (20) – (20) 1-17	Meath	Clones
14:00 GMT (UTC+0)				Venue: St Tiernach's Park
				Referee: Joe McQuillan (Cavan)

== Division 2 ==
=== Table ===
Pos	Team	Pld	W	D	L	PF	PA	PD	Pts	Qualification or relegation
1	Roscommon (P)	7	5	1	1	113	90	+23	11	NFL Division 2 champions and promotion to 2021 NFL Division 1
2	Armagh (P)	7	4	1	2	130	103	+27	9	Promotion to 2021 NFL Division 1
3	Kildare	7	4	0	3	106	99	+7	8	
4	Westmeath	7	3	1	3	106	111	−5	7 (Note: Head-to-head result: Westmeath 1-18 – 0-13 Laois.)	
5	Laois	7	3	1	3	104	113	−9	7	
6	Clare	7	3	0	4	90	99	−9	6 (Note: Head-to-head result: Clare 1-14 – 0-15 Cavan.)	
7	Cavan (R)	7	3	0	4	115	119	−4	6	Relegation to 2021 NFL Division 3
8	Fermanagh (R)	7	1	0	6	85	115	−30	2	Relegation to 2021 NFL Division 3

Updated to match(es) played on 24 October 2020. Source: GAA.ie
Rules for classification: 1) League points 2) Where only two teams are involved, the outcome of the meeting of the two teams in the competition 3) Scoring Difference 4) Highest Total Score For 5) A Play-Off.
(P) Promoted; (R) Relegated

==== Round 1 ====
25 January 2020 1	Armagh	2-18 (24) – (11) 1-08	Cavan	Armagh
				Venue: Athletic Grounds
		Report		Referee: Barry Cassidy

26 January 2020 1	Westmeath	2-09 (15) – (14) 1-11	Clare	Mullingar
				Venue: Cusack Park (Mullingar)
		Report		Referee: Niall Cullen

26 January 2020 1	Roscommon	2-14 (20) – (20) 2-14	Laois	Roscommon
				Venue: Dr Hyde Park
		Report		Referee: Ciaran Branagan

26 January 2020 1	Kildare	2-12 (18) – (14) 0-14	Fermanagh	Newbridge
				Venue: St Conleths Park
		Report		Referee: Fergal Kelly

==== Round 2 ====
1 February 2020 3	Cavan	1-17 (20) – (16) 1-13	Westmeath	Cavan
18:00 UTC (UTC)				Venue: Breffni Park
				Referee: Sean Laverty

1 February 2020 3	Laois	0-16 (16) – (10) 0-10	Armagh	Portlaoise
18:00 UTC (UTC)				Venue: O'Moore Park
				Referee: Jerome Henry

2 February 2020 3	Clare	0-11 (11) – (10) 0-10	Kildare	Ennis
14:00 UTC (UTC)				Venue: Cusack Park
				Referee: Barry Judge

2 February 2020 3	Fermanagh	0-13 (13) – (12) 0-12	Roscommon	Enniskillen
14:00 UTC (UTC)				Venue: Brewster Park
				Referee: Cormac Reilly

==== Round 3 ====
8 February 2020 3	Armagh	0-16 (16) – (10) 0-10	Kildare	Armagh
19:00				Venue: Athletic Grounds
				Referee: David Coldrick

9 February 2020 3	Westmeath	0-10 (10) – (08) 0-08	Fermanagh	Mullingar
14:00				Venue: Cusack Park
				Referee: Noel Mooney

16 February 2020 3	Laois	1-06 (09) – (19) 3-10	Cavan	Portlaoise
14:00				Venue: O'Moore Park
				Referee: Niall Cullen

9 February 2020 3	Roscommon	1-08 (11) – (04) 0-04	Clare	Roscommon
14:00				Venue: Dr Hyde Park
				Referee: Derek O'Mahoney

==== Round 4 ====
22 February 2020 4	Fermanagh	1-11 (14) – (17) 2-11	Cavan	Enniskillen
				Venue: Brewster Park
		Report		Referee: Sean Hurson

23 February 2020 4	Clare	1-11 (14) – (15) 1-12	Laois	Ennis
				Venue: Cusack Park
		Report		Referee: Liam Devenney

23 February 2020 4	Westmeath	3-12 (21) – (21) 2-15	Armagh	Mullingar
				Venue: TEG Cusack Park
		Report		Referee: Barry Cassidy

23 February 2020 4	Kildare	0-13 (13) – (17) 2-11	Roscommon	Newbridge
				Venue: St Conleth's Park
		Report		Referee: Martin McNally (Monaghan)

==== Round 5 ====
1 March 2020 5	Laois	0-10 (10) – (15) 0-15	Kildare	Portlaoise
				Venue: O'Moore Park
		Report		Referee: Joe McQuillan (Cavan)

7 March 2020 5	Fermanagh	0-10 (10) – (23) 3-14	Armagh	Enniskillen
				Venue: Brewster Park
		Report		Referee: Ciaran Branagan (Down)

1 March 2020 5	Cavan	0-15 (15) – (17) 1-14	Clare	Cavan
				Venue: Kingspan Breffni Park
		Report		Referee: Jerome Henry

1 March 2020 5	Roscommon	1-16 (19) – (12) 0-12	Westmeath	Roscommon
				Venue: Dr Hyde Park
		Report		Referee: Barry Tiernan

==== Round 6 ====
17 October 2020 6	Armagh	0-15 (15) – (19) 3-10	Roscommon	Armagh
				Venue: Athletic Grounds

18 October 2020 6	Clare	1-11 (14) – (12) 1-09	Fermanagh	Ennis
13:00 IST (UTC+1)				Venue: Cusack Park

17 October 2020 6	Westmeath	1-18 (21) – (13) 0-13	Laois	Mullingar
14:00 IST (UTC+1)				Venue: Cusack Park
		Report		Referee: Patrick Maguire

18 October 2020 6	Kildare	1-21 (24) – (20) 0-20	Cavan	Newbridge
14:00 IST (UTC+1)				Venue: St Conleth's Park

==== Round 7 ====
24 October 2020 7	Cavan	0-13 (13) – (15) 1-12	Roscommon	Cavan
14:00 IST (UTC+1)				Venue: Breffni Park
				Referee: Sean Hurson (Tyrone)

24 October 2020 7	Clare	1-13 (16) – (21) 1-18	Armagh	Ennis
14:00 IST (UTC+1)				Venue: Cusack Park
				Referee: Derek O'Mahoney (Tipperary)

24 October 2020 7	Kildare	0-16 (16) – (11) 0-11	Westmeath	Newbridge
14:00 IST (UTC+1)				Venue: St Conleth's Park
				Referee: Ciaran Branagan ((Down)

24 October 2020 7	Fermanagh	1-11 (14) – (21) 3-12	Laois	Enniskillen
14:00 IST (UTC+1)				Venue: Brewster Park (Enniskillen)
				Referee: Fergal Kelly (Longford)

== Division 3 ==
=== Table ===
Pos	Team	Pld	W	D	L	PF	PA	PD	Pts	Qualification or relegation
1	Cork (P)	7	7	0	0	132	90	+42	14	NFL Division 3 champions and promotion to 2021 NFL Division 2
2	Down (P)	7	4	1	2	87	87	0	9 (Note: Head-to-head result: Down 0-14 – 0-12 Derry.)	Promotion to 2021 NFL Division 2
3	Derry	7	4	1	2	110	95	+15	9	
4	Longford	7	3	1	3	96	90	+6	7 (Note: Head-to-head result: Longford 3-12 – 3-7 Tipperary.)	
5	Tipperary	7	3	1	3	99	104	−5	7	
6	Offaly	7	2	1	4	102	111	−9	5	
7	Leitrim (R)	7	1	1	5	90	109	−19	3	Relegation to 2021 NFL Division 4
8	Louth (R)	7	1	0	6	105	135	−30	2	Relegation to 2021 NFL Division 4

Updated to match(es) played on 25 October 2020. Source: GAA.ie
Rules for classification: 1) League points 2) Where only two teams are involved, the outcome of the meeting of the two teams in the competition 3) Scoring Difference 4) Highest Total Score For 5) A Play-Off.
(P) Promoted; (R) Relegated

==== Round 1 ====
25 January 2020 1	Derry	2-11 (17) – (17) 1-14	Leitrim	Derry
				Venue: Celtic Park
				Referee: Noel Mooney

25 January 2020 1	Cork	0-20 (20) – (13) 0-13	Offaly	Cork
				Venue: Páirc Uí Chaoimh
				Referee: Derek O'Mahoney

26 January 2020 1	Longford	0-16 (16) – (13) 1-10	Louth	Longford
				Venue: Pearse Park
				Referee: Martin McNally

26 January 2020 1	Tipperary	0-10 (10) – (10) 0-10	Down	Clonmel
				Referee: Anthony Nolan

==== Round 2 ====
1 February 2020 2	Down	0-14 (14) – (12) 0-12	Derry	Newry
				Venue: Páirc Esler
				Referee: Padriag Hughes

2 February 2020 2	Louth	1-07 (10) – (11) 0-11	Tipperary	Drogheda
				Venue: Gaelic Grounds
				Referee: John Hickey

2 February 2020 2	Leitrim	0-09 (09) – (18) 1-15	Cork	Carrick-on-Shannon
				Venue: Páirc Seán MacDiarmada
				Referee: Patrick Maguire

2 February 2020 2	Offaly	0-10 (10) – (10) 0-10	Longford	Tullamore
				Venue: O'Connor Park
		Liam Devenney

==== Round 3 ====
9 February 2020 3	Derry	0-10 (10) – (06) 0-06	Tipperary	Derry
13:00				Venue: Celtic Park
				Referee: Jerome Henry

9 February 2020 3	Longford	2-14 (20) – (12) 1-09	Leitrim	Longford
14:00				Venue: Pearse Park
				Referee: Padraig Hughes

16 February 2020 3	Louth	2-10 (16) – (19) 2-13	Offaly	Drogheda
14:00				Venue: Gaelic Grounds
				Referee: Paul Faloon

9 February 2020 3	Cork	0-16 (16) – (11) 1-08	Down	Cork
14:00				Venue: Pairc Ui Chaoimh
				Referee: Barry Tiernan

==== Round 4 ====
22 February 2020 4	Down	2-13 (19) – (17) 1-14	Longford	Newry
				Venue: Páirc Esler
				Referee: Cormac Reilly

22 February 2020 4	Tipperary	0-21 (21) – (22) 3-13	Cork	Thurles
				Venue: Semple Stadium
				Referee: Brendan Cawley

23 February 2020 4	Derry	2-10 (16) – (12) 1-09	Louth	Derry
				Venue: Celtic Park
				Referee: Barry Judge

23 February 2020 4	Leitrim	0-14 (14) – (22) 2-16	Offaly	Carrick-on-Shannon
				Venue: Páirc Seán MacDiarmada
				Referee: Seán Laverty

==== Round 5 ====
1 March 2020 5	Louth	1-12 (15) – (23) 3-14	Leitrim	Dowdallshill
				Venue: Páirc Naomh Bríd
				Referee: Liam Devenney

1 March 2020 5	Cork	3-13 (22) – (20) 3-11	Derry	Cork
				Venue: Páirc Uí Chaoimh
				Referee: Fergal Kelly

1 March 2020 5	Longford	3-12 (21) – (16) 3-07	Tipperary	Longford
				Venue: Pearse Park
				Referee: Niall McKenna

1 March 2020 5	Offaly	0-09 (09) – (17) 0-17	Down	Tullamore
				Venue: O'Connor Park
				Referee: James Bermingham

==== Round 6 ====
17 October 2020 6	Down	w/o – scr	Leitrim	Newry
				Venue: Páirc Esler

17 October 2020 6	Cork	5-19 (34) – (16) 0-16	Louth	Cork
16:00 IST (UTC+1)				Venue: Páirc Uí Chaoimh

17 October 2020 6	Derry	2-14 (20) – (12) 0-12	Longford	Derry
16:30 IST (UTC+1)				Venue: Celtic Park

18 October 2020 6	Tipperary	1-16 (19) – (16) 0-16	Offaly	Thurles
16:00 IST (UTC+1)				Venue: Semple Stadium

==== Round 7 ====
Longford	scr – w/o	Cork

25 October 2020 7	Louth	3-14 (23) – (16) 0-16	Down	Dundalk
14:00 GMT (UTC+0)				Venue: Dowdallshill
				Referee: Martin McNally (Monaghan)

25 October 2020 7	Leitrim	0-15 (15) – (17) 2-11	Tipperary	Carrick-on-Shannon
14:00 GMT (UTC+0)				Venue: Páirc Seán Mac Diarmada
				Referee: Padraig Hughes (Armagh)

25 October 2020 7	Offaly	1-10 (13) – (15) 1-12	Derry	Tullamore
14:00 GMT (UTC+0)				Venue: O'Connor Park
				Referee: John Ryan (Cork)

== Division 4 ==
=== Table ===
Pos	Team	Pld	W	D	L	PF	PA	PD	Pts	Qualification or relegation
1	Limerick (P)	7	5	0	2	103	103	0	10 (Note: Head-to-head result: Limerick 5-10 – 1-14 Wicklow.)	Promotion to Division 3
2	Wicklow (P)	7	5	0	2	130	91	+39	10	Promotion to Division 3
3	Antrim	7	4	1	2	112	109	+3	9	
4	Wexford	7	4	0	3	103	87	+16	8 (Note: Head-to-head result: Wexford 2-10 – 1-6 Carlow.)	
5	Carlow	7	3	2	2	83	87	−4	8	
6	Sligo	7	3	0	4	119	115	+4	6	
7	Waterford	7	2	1	4	79	95	−16	5	
8	London	7	0	0	7	56	98	−42	0	

Updated to match(es) played on 18 October 2020. Source: GAA.ie
Rules for classification: 1) League points 2) Where only two teams are involved, the outcome of the meeting of the two teams in the competition 3) Scoring Difference 4) Highest Total Score For 5) A Play-Off.
(P) Promoted

==== Round 1 ====
25 January 2020 1	Carlow	0-11 (11) – (09) 0-09	Wicklow	Carlow
19:00 GMT (UTC+0)				Venue: Dr Cullen Park
				Referee: Brendan Cawley (Kildare)

25 January 2020 1	Waterford	0-10 (10) – (13) 1-10	Limerick	Dungarvan
19:00 GMT (UTC+0)				Venue: Fraher Field
				Referee: James Bermingham (Cork)

26 January 2020 1	Antrim	3-10 (19) – (13) 0-13	Wexford	Glenavy
14:00 GMT (UTC+0)
				Referee: Barry Tiernan (Dublin)

26 January 2020 1	London	0-11 (11) – (23) 5-08	Sligo	Ruislip
14:00 GMT (UTC+0)				Venue: McGovern Park
				Referee: Paul Faloon (Down)

==== Round 2 ====
1 February 2020 2	Wexford	2-10 (16) – (09) 1-06	Carlow	Wexford
				Venue: Wexford Park
				Referee: Seamus Mulhare

2 February 2020 2	Limerick	0-08 (08) – (07) 0-07	London	Rathkeale
				Venue: Mick Neville Park
				Referee: David Murnane

2 February 2020 2	Wicklow	2-11 (17) – (09) 1-06	Waterford	Aughrim
				Referee: David Hickey

2 February 2020 2	Sligo	0-15 (15) – (14) 0-14	Antrim	Sligo
				Venue: Markievicz Park
				Referee: Niall McKenna

==== Round 3 ====
8 February 2020 3	Waterford	0-08 (08) – (09) 2-03	Wexford	Dungarvan
19:00 GMT (UTC+0)				Venue: Fraher Field
				Referee: John Ryan

9 February 2020 3	Carlow	0-09 (09) – (10) 1-07	Limerick	Carlow
14:00 GMT (UTC+0)				Venue: Dr Cullen Park
				Referee: Sean Lonergan

9 February 2020 3	London	0-10 (10) – (14) 0-14	Antrim	Ruislip
14:00 GMT (UTC+0)				Venue: McGovern Park
				Referee: James Bermingham

16 February 2020 3	Wicklow	1-15 (18) – (13) 1-10	Sligo	Aughrim
14:00 GMT (UTC+0)
				Referee: Kevin Faloon

==== Round 4 ====
22 February 2020 4	Sligo	0-16 (16) – (18) 2-12	Waterford	Sligo
14:00 GMT (UTC+0)				Venue: Markievicz Park
				Referee: Kevin Faloon (Armagh)

23 February 2020 4	Wexford	4-15 (27) – (12) 1-09	London	Wexford
14:00 GMT (UTC+0)				Venue: Wexford Park
				Referee: David Murnane (Waterford)

22 February 2020 4	Limerick	5-10 (25) – (17) 1-14	Wicklow	Rathkeale
14:00 GMT (UTC+0)				Venue: Mick Neville Park
				Referee: Brendan Griffin (Kerry)

22 February 2020 4	Antrim	0-11 (11) – (11) 1-08	Carlow	Glenavy
14:00 GMT (UTC+0)
				Referee: Conor Dourneen (Cavan)

==== Round 5 ====
29 February 2020 5	London	2-10 (16) – (24) 5-09	Wicklow	Ruislip
13:00 GMT (UTC+0)				Venue: McGovern Park
				Referee: John Hickey

29 February 2020 5	Wexford	1-09 (12) – (13) 2-07	Sligo	Wexford
14:00 GMT (UTC+0)				Venue: Wexford Park
				Referee: Sean Lonergan

29 February 2020 5	Waterford	2-14 (20) – (20) 2-14	Carlow	Dungarvan
19:00 GMT (UTC+0)				Venue: Fraher Field
				Referee: Brendan Griffin

1 March 2020 5	Antrim	2-21 (27) – (15) 1-12	Limerick	Portglenone
14:00 GMT (UTC+0)				Venue: Kelly Park
				Referee: Paul Faloon

==== Round 6 ====
17 October 2020 6	Carlow	2-17 (23) – (21) 2-15	Sligo	Carlow
17:00 IST (UTC+1)				Venue: Dr Cullen Park

17 October 2020 6	Wicklow	7-11 (32) – (07) 0-07	Antrim	Aughrim
12:30 IST (UTC+1)				Venue: Joule Park

18 October 2020 6	Limerick	1-10 (13) – (16) 1-13	Wexford	Rathkeale
15:00 IST (UTC+1)				Venue: Mick Neville Park

Waterford	w/o – scr	London

==== Round 7 ====
24 October 2020 7	Antrim	2-14 (20) – (13) 0-13	Waterford	Haggardstown
14:00 IST (UTC+1)				Venue: McGeough Park
				Referee: Niall McKenna (Monaghan)

24 October 2020 7	Wexford	0-10 (10) – (13) 0-13	Wicklow	Wexford
14:00 IST (UTC+1)				Venue: Wexford Park

24 October 2020 7	Sligo	1-14 (17) – (19) 1-16	Limerick	Sligo
14:00 IST (UTC+1)				Venue: Markievicz Park

London	scr – w/o	Carlow

== League statistics ==
=== Top scorer: Overall ===
Rank	Player	County	Tally	Total
1	Shane Walsh	Galway	2-29	35
2	Shane McGuigan	Derry	2-28	34
3	Keith Beirne	Leitrim	1-29	32
4	Ben Brosnan	Wexford	3-22	31
5	Dean Rock	Dublin	2-23	29
6	David Clifford	Kerry	2-21	27
7	Darren McCurry	Tyrone	1-23	26
8	Paddy Cunningham	Antrim	0-25	25
8	John Heslin	Westmeath	1-22	25
10	Seán O'Shea	Kerry	1-21	24
10	Michael Murphy	Donegal	2-18	24
10	Evan O'Carroll	Laois	1-21	24
