= Gaelic Athletic Association Congress =

Legislative body of the Gaelic Athletic Association

The GAA Congress is the supreme legislative body of the Gaelic Athletic Association (Irish: Cumann Lúthchleas Gael [ˈkʊmˠən̪ˠ ˈl̪ˠuːˌçlʲasˠ ˈɡeːlˠ]), commonly known by its acronymic, the GAA. The GAA is the international governing body of Gaelic games such as football and hurling. The congress may be annual or special.

An annual congress is where changes to the rule book, the Official Guide, may be undertaken; where the year is reviewed; and where a new president of the association formally takes office. It is a democratic meeting in which delegates from the county boards and provincial councils have speaking and voting rights.

Congress can attract significant attention depending on the issues being voted upon. A 2001 Special Congress held on 17 November voted to overturn Rule 21, the ban on members of the British security forces from holding GAA membership, shortly after the Police Service of Northern Ireland (PSNI) came into being. The 2005 Congress was particularly significant; it made the historic vote to relax Rule 42, allowing Croke Park to be used by the Irish rugby union and association football authorities during the reconstruction of their stadium at Lansdowne Road.

The 2021 Congress occurred online due to the COVID-19 pandemic.
