= 2020 Dr McKenna Cup =

Gaelic football competition in Ulster, Ireland

Tournament details
- Province: Ulster
- Year: 2020
- Dates: 29 December 2019 – 18 January 2020
- Teams: 9
- Defending champions: Tyrone

Winners
- Champions: Tyrone (17th win)
- Manager: Mickey Harte
- Captain: Kieran McGeary

Runners-up
- Runners-up: Monaghan
- Manager: Séamus McEnaney
- Captain: Ryan Wylie

Other
- Matches played: 11
- Website: Ulster GAA

The 2020 Dr McKenna Cup, known for sponsorship reasons as the Bank of Ireland Dr McKenna Cup, is a Gaelic football competition in the province of Ulster for county teams. It is held at the beginning of the GAA season.

The draw was made on 4 December 2019 with the fixtures confirmed following a meeting of Comhairle Uladh CCC later in the month. For the first time in many years, no third-level teams took part, due to the changed schedule for the Sigerson Cup.

Tyrone were the winners for the eighth time in nine years.

== Competition format ==
Group Stage

The nine teams were drawn into three sections of three teams. Each team plays the other teams in their section once, either home or away. Two points are awarded for a win and one for a draw. The points-ratio method (points for divided by points against) is used to determine the ranking of teams who are level on section points (as opposed to the more typical scoring differential). The competition will begin on Sunday 29 December 2019.

Knock-out Stage

The winners of the three sections and the best of the runners-up in the three sections compete in the semi-finals with the two winners meeting in the final.

== Group stage ==
=== Section A ===
Pos	Team	Pld	W	D	L	PF	PA	PR	Pts	Qualification
1	Donegal	2	2	0	0	28	22	1.273	4	Advance to semi-final
2	Monaghan	2	1	0	1	34	29	1.172	2	Advance to semi-final
3	Derry	2	0	0	2	22	33	0.667	0	

Updated to match(es) played on 8 January 2020. Source: Ulster GAA

29 December 2019 Round 1	Monaghan	1-17 (20) – (14) 0-14	Derry	Inniskeen
14:00 GMT (UTC±0)				Venue: Inniskeen Grattans GAC
		Report		Referee: Pádraig Hughes

5 January 2020 Round 2	Donegal	1-12 (15) – (14) 0-14	Monaghan	Ballybofey
14:00 GMT (UTC±0)				Venue: MacCumhaill Park
		Report		Referee: Noel Mooney

8 January 2020 Round 3	Derry	0-08 (8) – (13) 1-10	Donegal	Derry
20:00 GMT (UTC±0)				Venue: Celtic Park
		Report

=== Section B ===
Pos	Team	Pld	W	D	L	PF	PA	PR	Pts	Qualification
1	Down	2	2	0	0	37	21	1.762	4	Advance to semi-final
2	Antrim	2	1	0	1	28	36	0.778	2	
3	Fermanagh	2	0	0	2	20	28	0.714	0	

Updated to match(es) played on 8 January 2020. Source: Ulster GAA

29 December 2019 Round 1	Fermanagh	0-07 (7) – (14) 1-11	Down	Enniskillen
14:00 GMT (UTC±0)				Venue: Brewster Park
		Report		Referee: Conor Dourneen

5 January 2020 Round 2	Antrim	2-08 (14) – (13) 0-13	Fermanagh	Ahoghill
14:00 GMT (UTC±0)				Venue: Fr McGuigan Park
		Report		Referee: Kevin Faloon

8 January 2020 Round 3	Down	2-17 (23) – (14) 0-14	Antrim	Newry
20:00 GMT (UTC±0)				Venue: Páirc Esler
		Report

=== Section C ===
Pos	Team	Pld	W	D	L	PF	PA	PR	Pts	Qualification
1	Tyrone	2	2	0	0	46	37	1.243	4	Advance to semi-final
2	Armagh	2	1	0	1	47	43	1.093	2	
3	Cavan	2	0	0	2	29	42	0.690	0	

Updated to match(es) played on 8 January 2020. Source: Ulster GAA

29 December 2019 Round 1	Cavan	1-13 (16) – (23) 2-17	Armagh	Cavan
14:00 GMT (UTC±0)				Venue: Breffni Park
		Report		Referee: Niall McKenna

5 January 2020 Round 2	Tyrone	1-16 (19) – (13) 0-13	Cavan	Omagh
14:00 GMT (UTC±0)				Venue: Healy Park
		Report		Referee: Paul Faloon

8 January 2020 Round 3	Armagh	3-15 (24) – (27) 3-18	Tyrone	Armagh
20:00 GMT (UTC±0)				Venue: Athletic Grounds
		Report

=== Ranking of section runners-up ===
Pos	Grp	Team	Pld	W	D	L	PF	PA	PR	Pts	Qualification
1	A	Monaghan	2	1	0	1	34	29	1.172	2	Advance to semi-final
2	C	Armagh	2	1	0	1	47	43	1.093	2	
3	B	Antrim	2	1	0	1	28	36	0.778	2	

Updated to match(es) played on 8 January 2020. Source: Ulster GAA

== Knock-out stage ==
=== Semi-finals ===
12 January 2020
14:00 GMT (UTC±0)
Semi-Final 1

Donegal	conc. – w/o	Monaghan

Brewster Park, Enniskillen

12 January 2020
14:00 GMT (UTC±0)
Semi-Final 2

Report

Down	1-10 (13) – (22) 2-16	Tyrone
(HT: 0-04 – 1-12)

Athletic Grounds, Armagh
Referee: Dan Mullan (Derry)

=== Final ===
18 January 2020
19:30 GMT (UTC±0)
Final

Report

Tyrone	0-11 (11) – (8) 1-05	Monaghan
(HT: 0-08 – 0-03)
Pts: R O'Neill 4 (1f), D McCurry 3, R O'Neill 3 (1f), K McGeary 1, F Burns 1, D Kerr 1, M O'Neill 1		Gls: B McBennett 1 Pts: C McCarthy 3, S Carey 2 (1f)

Athletic Grounds, Armagh
Referee: C Branagan (Down)
