= 2021 National Football League (Ireland) =

Gaelic football competition

League details
- Dates: 15 May – 19 June 2021
- Teams: 31

League champions
- Winners: Kerry/Dublin (22nd and 14th win)

Other division winners
- Division 2: Kildare and Mayo
- Division 3: Derry
- Division 4 Shield: Wexford

The 2021 National Football League, known for sponsorship reasons as the Allianz National Football League, was the 90th staging of the National Football League (NFL), an annual Gaelic football tournament for Gaelic Athletic Association county teams. Thirty-one county teams from the island of Ireland compete; Kilkenny do not participate. London did not participate, due to restrictions around travel in place to deal with the COVID-19 pandemic.

In December 2020, it was announced that each division would be divided into North and South sections in order to reduce fixtures and minimise cross-border matches. This plan had been hinted at as early as September 2020. Teams would play three league games, plus possibly two knockout matches, allowing the tournament to be finished in just five rounds of games. In February 2021, it was announced that the league would be delayed due to the impact of the COVID-19 pandemic on Gaelic games and that cancelling it would be a last resort. It began on 15 May 2021.

Due to COVID-19, finals were not played if a team had a championship game scheduled for the following week. This resulted in three divisions having their finals cancelled and being awarded jointly. Kerry and Dublin shared the Division 1 title; Kildare and Mayo Division 2; and Antrim and Louth Division 4. Offaly and Derry would have shared the Division 3 title, but chose to play the final instead. It was a pilot COVID test event with 2,400 spectators permitted, and Derry won.

== Format ==
=== League structure ===
Teams by Province and Division
Province	Division 1	Division 2	Division 3	Division 4	Total
Connacht	2	1	0	2	5
Leinster	1	4	3	3	11
Munster	1	2	2	1	6
Ulster	4	1	3	1	9
Britain	0	0	0	0	0
Total	8	8	8	7	31

The 2021 National Football League consists of three divisions of eight teams and one of seven. Each division is divided into a North and South section; each team plays every other team in its section once. Two points are awarded for a win and one point for a draw.

In the top division, Division 1, teams compete to become the National Football League (NFL) champions. The top two in each section qualify for the NFL semi-finals.

Teams compete for promotion and relegation to a higher or lower league. In Divisions 2, 3 and 4, the top two teams in each group play in the divisional semi-finals, with each team that reaches the divisional final being promoted.

Division finals are not played if a team is scheduled to play a championship match on 26/27 June 2021; the division title will be shared.

The bottom two teams in each section in Divisions 1, 2 and 3 enter relegation playoffs, with the losers relegated.

The third-placed teams in each section in Division 4 enter the Division 4 Shield Final.

=== Tiebreakers for league ranking ===
As per the Official GAA Guide - Part 1 - Section 6.21 -

If two teams in the same group are equal on points on completion of the group phase, the following tie-breaking criteria are applied:

1. Where two teams only are involved - the outcome of the meeting of the two teams in the group game;

If three or more teams in the same group are equal on points on completion of the group phase, the following tie-breaking criteria are applied:

1. Scoring Difference (subtracting the total scores against from total scores for);
2. Highest Total Score For;
3. A Play-Off.

In the event that two teams or more finish with equal points, but have been affected by a disqualification, loss of game on a proven objection, retirement or walkover, the tie shall be decided by the following means:

1. Score Difference from the games in which only the teams involved, (teams tied on points), have played each other. (subtracting the total Scores Against from total Scores For)
2. Highest Total Score For, in which only the teams involved, have played each other, and have finished equal under rule 1 above
3. A Play-Off

== Division 1 ==
Locations of the 2021 NFL Division 1 teams.
Red: North section; Green: South section.

=== Division 1 North ===
==== Table ====
Pos	Team	Pld	W	D	L	PF	PA	PD	Pts	Qualification
1	Donegal	3	1	2	0	38	36	+2	4	Advance to NFL semi-finals
2	Tyrone	3	1	1	1	37	34	+3	3	Advance to NFL semi-finals
3	Armagh	3	1	1	1	35	36	−1	3	Advance to a relegation playoff; losers are relegated to Division 2
4	Monaghan	3	0	2	1	35	39	−4	2	Advance to a relegation playoff; losers are relegated to Division 2

Updated to match(es) played on 29 May 2021. Source: GAA.ie
Rules for classification: Tiebreakers

==== Matches ====
===== Round 1 =====
15 May 2021 1	Tyrone	0-16 (16) – (18) 0-18	Donegal	Omagh
17:00				Venue: Healy Park
		Report		Referee: Joe McQuillan (Cavan)

16 May 2021 1	Monaghan	1-12 (15) – (19) 1-16	Armagh	Enniskillen
15:00				Venue: Brewster Park
				Referee: Ciaran Branagan

===== Round 2 =====
22 May 2021 2	Donegal	1-20 (23) – (23) 4-11	Monaghan	Ballybofey
17:00				Venue: MacCumhaill Park
		Report		Referee: Barry Cassidy

22 May 2021 2	Armagh	2-10 (16) – (21) 2-15	Tyrone	Armagh
19:00				Venue: Athletic Grounds
				Referee: David Gough

==== Round 3 ====
29 May 2021 3	Armagh	1-16 (19) – (19) 1-16	Donegal	Armagh
19:30				Venue: Athletic Grounds
		Report

29 May 2021 3	Tyrone	0-14 (14) – (14) 0-14	Monaghan	Omagh
19:30				Venue: Healy Park
		Report

=== Division 1 South ===
==== Table ====
Pos	Team	Pld	W	D	L	PF	PA	PD	Pts	Qualification
1	Kerry (C)	3	2	1	0	75	47	+28	5	Advance to NFL semi-finals
2	Dublin (C)	3	2	1	0	68	55	+13	5	Advance to NFL semi-finals
3	Galway (R)	3	1	0	2	51	71	−20	2	Advance to Division 1 relegation playoffs; two losers are relegated to Division 2
4	Roscommon (R)	3	0	0	3	47	68	−21	0	Advance to Division 1 relegation playoffs; two losers are relegated to Division 2

Updated to match(es) played on 30 May 2021. Source: GAA.ie
Rules for classification: Tiebreakers
(C) NFL champions (shared); (R) Relegated

==== Matches ====
===== Round 1 =====
15 May 2021 1	Kerry	4-21 (33) – (11) 0-11	Galway	Tralee
15:00				Venue: Austin Stack Park
		Report		Referee: Conor Lane (Cork)

16 May 2021 1	Roscommon	0-16 (16) – (25) 1-22	Dublin	Roscommon
13:45				Venue: Dr Hyde Park
				Referee: Derek O'Mahoney

===== Round 2 =====
23 May 2021 2	Dublin	4-9 (21) – (21) 1-18	Kerry	Thurles
13:45				Venue: Semple Stadium
				Referee: Sean Hurson

23 May 2021 2	Galway	2-16 (22) – (16) 1-13	Roscommon	Salthill
14:00				Venue: Pearse Stadium
				Referee: David Coldrick

==== Round 3 ====
30 May 2021 3	Galway	1-15 (18) – (22) 2-16	Dublin	Tuam
15:45				Venue: Tuam Stadium
				Referee: Brendan Cawley

30 May 2021 3	Roscommon	1-12 (15) – (21) 2-15	Kerry	Roscommon
15:45				Venue: Dr Hyde Park
				Referee: Joe Mc Quillan

=== Division 1 Relegation Playoffs ===
GAAGO

13 June 2021
15:00 IST (UTC+1)
Relegation playoff

Armagh	1-17 (20) – (11) 0-11	Roscommon

Athletic Grounds, Armagh
Referee: Sean Hurson

TG4

13 June 2021
15:45 IST (UTC+1)
Relegation playoff

Monaghan	1-21 (24) – (23) 2-17 (a.e.t.)	Galway

St. Tiernach's Park, Clones
Referee: David Gough

=== Division 1 Finals ===
TG4

12 June 2021
17:00 IST (UTC+1)
Semi-Final

Report

Kerry	6-15 (33) – (17) 1-14	Tyrone
(HT: 5-06 – 0-07)

Fitzgerald Stadium, Killarney
Referee: Conor Lane

TG4

12 June 2021
19:15 IST (UTC+1)
Semi-Final

Report

Donegal	1-14 (17) – (21) 1-18	Dublin
(HT: 0-07 – 1-08)

Kingspan Breffni Park, Cavan
Referee: Ciaran Branagan

Dublin and Kerry shared the 2021 NFL title, as Kerry had a championship game on 26 June 2021.

== Division 2 ==
Locations of the 2021 NFL Division 2 teams.
Red: North section; Green: South section.

=== Division 2 North ===
==== Table ====
Pos	Team	Pld	W	D	L	PF	PA	PD	Pts	Qualification
1	Mayo (P)	3	3	0	0	74	50	+24	6	Advance to Division 2 semi-finals; both finalists are promoted to Division 1
2	Meath	3	2	0	1	55	55	0	4	Advance to Division 2 semi-finals; both finalists are promoted to Division 1
3	Down	3	1	0	2	41	60	−19	2	Advance to a relegation playoff; losers are relegated to Division 3
4	Westmeath (R)	3	0	0	3	45	50	−5	0	Advance to a relegation playoff; losers are relegated to Division 3

Updated to match(es) played on 30 May 2021. Source: GAA.ie
Rules for classification: Tiebreakers
(P) Promoted; (R) Relegated

==== Matches ====
===== Round 1 =====
15 May 2021 1	Mayo	2-21 (27) – (14) 1-11	Down	Castlebar
14:00				Venue: MacHale Park
		Report		Referee: Fergal Kelly (Longford)

16 May 2021 1	Meath	0-16 (16) – (15) 0-15	Westmeath	Navan
15:45				Venue: Páirc Tailteann
				Referee: Brendan Cawley

===== Round 2 =====
22 May 2021 2	Westmeath	2-12 (18) – (21) 0-21	Mayo	Mullingar
15:00				Venue: Cusack Park
				Referee: Noel Mooney

23 May 2021 2	Down	0-14 (14) – (21) 2-15	Meath	Armagh
15:45				Venue: Athletic Grounds
				Referee: Niall Cullen

==== Round 3 ====
30 May 2021 3	Mayo	3-17 (26) – (18) 2-12	Meath	Castlebar
13:45				Venue: MacHale Park
		Report		Referee: Martin McNally

30 May 2021 3	Westmeath	1-9 (12) – (13) 0-13	Down	Mullingar
13:45				Venue: Cusack Park
				Referee: Sean Lonergan

=== Division 2 South ===
==== Table ====
Pos	Team	Pld	W	D	L	PF	PA	PD	Pts	Qualification
1	Kildare (P)	3	2	0	1	55	41	+14	4	Advance to Division 2 semi-finals; both finalists are promoted to Division 1
2	Clare	3	2	0	1	56	47	+9	4	Advance to Division 2 semi-finals; both finalists are promoted to Division 1
3	Cork	3	2	0	1	54	49	+5	4	Advance to a relegation playoff; losers are relegated to Division 3
4	Laois (R)	3	0	0	3	33	61	−28	0	Advance to a relegation playoff; losers are relegated to Division 3

Updated to match(es) played on 30 May 2021. Source: GAA.ie
Rules for classification: Tiebreakers
(P) Promoted; (R) Relegated

==== Matches ====
===== Round 1 =====
15 May 2021 1	Cork	0-14 (14) – (18) 2-12	Kildare	Thurles
15:30				Venue: Semple Stadium
		Report		Referee: Maurice Deegan (Laois)

16 May 2021 3	Clare	1-16 (19) – (12) 0-12	Laois	Ennis
16:00				Venue: Cusack Park
				Referee: Sean Lonergan

===== Round 2 =====
22 May 2021 2	Laois	0-10 (10) – (18) 2-12	Cork	Portlaoise
19:00				Venue: O'Moore Park
				Referee: Barry Judge

23 May 2021 2	Kildare	0-13 (13) – (16) 1-13	Clare	Newbridge
14:00				Venue: St. Conleth's Park
				Referee: Fergal Kelly

==== Round 3 ====
30 May 2021 3	Laois	1-8 (11) – (24) 2-18	Kildare	Portlaoise
13:45				Venue: O'Moore Park
		Report		Referee: Paul Faloon

30 May 2021 3	Clare	1-18 (21) – (22) 0-22	Cork	Ennis
13:45				Venue: Cusack Park
		Report		Referee: Derek O'Mahoney

=== Division 2 Relegation Playoffs ===
GAAGO

12 June 2021
14:00 IST (UTC+1)
Relegation playoff

Cork	3-22 (31) – (25) 0-25	Westmeath

Páirc Uí Chaoimh, Cork
Referee: Cormac Reilly

GAAGO

12 June 2021
18:15 IST (UTC+1)
Relegation playoff

Down	2-19 (25) – (18) 2-12	Laois

Páirc Esler, Newry
Referee: Jerome Henry

=== Division 2 Finals ===
TG4

13 June 2021
13:45 IST (UTC+1)
Semi-Final

Clare	2-18 (24) – (28) 2-22	Mayo

Cusack Park, Ennis
Referee: Niall Cullen

GAAGO

13 June 2021
14:00 IST (UTC+1)
Semi-Final

Kildare	1-14 (17) – (14) 0-14	Meath

St. Conleth's Park, Newbridge
Referee: Barry Cassidy

Kildare and Mayo shared the Division 2 title, as Mayo had a championship game on 26 June 2021.

== Division 3 ==
Locations of the 2021 NFL Division 3 teams.
Red: North section; Green: South section.

=== Division 3 North ===
==== Table ====
Pos	Team	Pld	W	D	L	PF	PA	PD	Pts	Qualification
1	Derry (P)	3	3	0	0	49	14	+35	6	Advance to Division 3 semi-finals; both finalists are promoted to Division 2
2	Fermanagh	3	1	1	1	24	42	−18	3	Advance to Division 3 semi-finals; both finalists are promoted to Division 2
3	Cavan (R)	3	1	0	2	36	31	+5	2	Advance to a relegation playoff; losers are relegated to Division 4
4	Longford	3	0	1	2	21	43	−22	1	Advance to a relegation playoff; losers are relegated to Division 4

Updated to match(es) played on 29 May 2021. Source: GAA.ie
Rules for classification: Tiebreakers
(P) Promoted; (R) Relegated

==== Matches ====
===== Round 1 =====
15 May 2021 1	Longford	0-5 (5) – (21) 0-21	Derry	Longford
17:00				Venue: Pearse Park
		Report		Referee: Jerome Henry

15 May 2021 1	Fermanagh	0-15 (15) – (14) 0-14	Cavan	Enniskillen
19:00				Venue: Brewster Park
		Report		Referee: Martin McNally

===== Round 2 =====
22 May 2021 2	Derry	5-13 (28) – (9) 0-9	Fermanagh	Owenbeg
17:00				Venue: Derry GAA Ground
				Referee: Paul Faloon

22 May 2021 2	Cavan	1-19 (22) – (16) 1-13	Longford	Cavan
19:00				Venue: Breffni Park
				Referee: Cormac Reilly

==== Round 3 ====
29 May 2021 3	Cavan	2-11 (17) – (19) 1-16	Derry	Cavan
15:00				Venue: Breffni Park
				Referee: Padraig Hughes

29 May 2021 3	Fermanagh	1-15 (18) – (18) 1-15	Longford	Enniskillen
15:00				Venue: Brewster Park
				Referee: Liam Devenney

=== Division 3 South ===
==== Table ====
Pos	Team	Pld	W	D	L	PF	PA	PD	Pts	Qualification
1	Offaly (P)	3	3	0	0	33	27	+6	6	Advance to Division 3 semi-finals; both finalists are promoted to Division 2
2	Limerick	3	2	0	1	30	30	0	4	Advance to Division 3 semi-finals; both finalists are promoted to Division 2
3	Tipperary (R)	3	1	0	2	32	31	+1	2	Advance to a relegation playoff; losers are relegated to Division 4
4	Wicklow	3	0	0	3	28	35	−7	0	Advance to a relegation playoff; losers are relegated to Division 4

Updated to match(es) played on 29 May 2021. Source: GAA.ie
Rules for classification: Tiebreakers
(P) Promoted; (R) Relegated

==== Matches ====
===== Round 1 =====
15 May 2021 1	Limerick	1-13 (16) – (14) 0-14	Tipperary	Limerick
17:00				Venue: Gaelic Grounds
		Report		Referee: Brendan Griffin

16 May 2021 1	Wicklow	1-10 (13) – (17) 1-14	Offaly	Aughrim
14:00				Venue: Aughrim County Ground
				Referee: Seamus Mulhare

===== Round 2 =====
22 May 2021 2	Offaly	0-16 (16) – (14) 1-11	Limerick	Tullamore
15:00				Venue: O'Connor Park
				Referee: John Gilmartin

22 May 2021 2	Tipperary	2-12 (18) – (15) 1-12	Wicklow	Thurles
16:30				Venue: Semple Stadium
				Referee: Seamus Mulvihill

==== Round 3 ====
29 May 2021 3	Offaly	1-17 (20) – (15) 1-12	Tipperary	Tullamore
15:00				Venue: O'Connor Park
				Referee: James Bermingham

29 May 2021 3	Wicklow	1-12 (15) – (25) 2-19	Limerick	Aughrim
15:00				Venue: Aughrim County Ground
				Referee: Niall McKenna

=== Division 3 Relegation Playoffs ===
GAAGO

12 June 2021
14:00 IST (UTC+1)
Relegation playoff

Report

Cavan	0-18 (18) – (20) 3-11	Wicklow

Páirc Tailteann, Navan
Referee: Barry Judge

GAAGO

13 June 2021
15:45 IST (UTC+1)
Relegation playoff

Report

Longford	1-13 (16) – (9) 0-09	Tipperary

Glennon Brothers Pearse Park, Longford
Referee: Seamus Mulhare

=== Division 3 Finals ===
GAAGO

12 June 2021
16:00 IST (UTC+1)
Semi-Final

Derry	0-17 (17) – (13) 0-13	Limerick

Páirc Seán Mac Diarmada, Carrick-on-Shannon
Referee: Noel Mooney

GAAGO

12 June 2021
18:00 IST (UTC+1)
Semi-Final

Offaly	1-14 (17) – (12) 0-12	Fermanagh

O'Connor Park, Tullamore
Referee: Patrick Maguire

TG4

19 June 2021
17:00 IST (UTC+1)
Final

Report

Derry	0-21 (21) – (9) 1-06	Offaly

Croke Park, Dublin
Referee: Sean Lonergan
Attendance: 2,400

== Division 4 ==
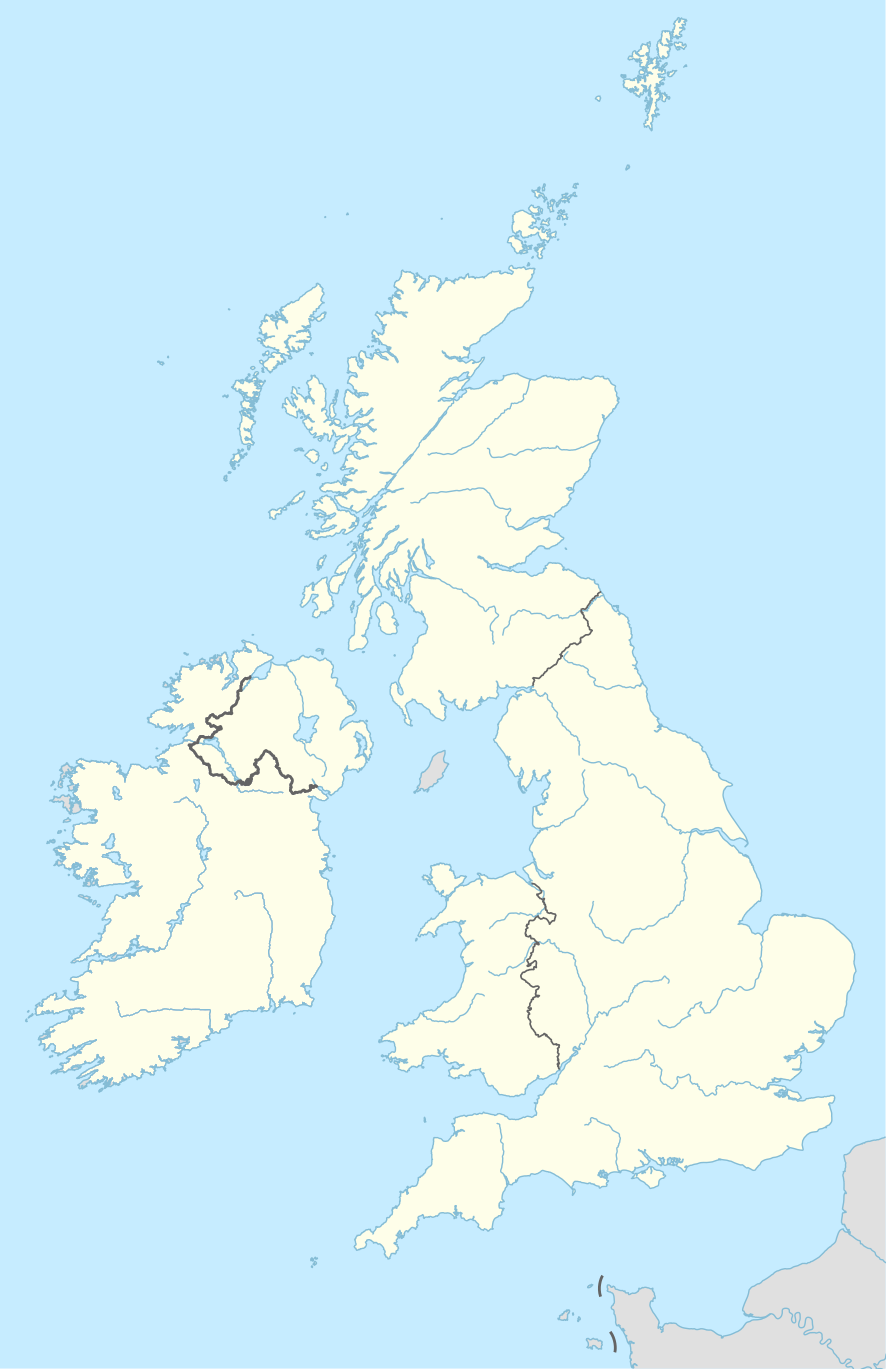
Locations of the 2021 NFL Division 4 teams.
Red: North section; Green: South section; Grey: Not competing.

=== Division 4 North ===
==== Table ====
Pos	Team	Pld	W	D	L	PF	PA	PD	Pts	Qualification
1	Antrim (P)	3	3	0	0	63	60	+3	6	Advance to Division 4 semi-finals; both finalists are promoted to Division 3
2	Louth (P)	3	2	0	1	63	45	+18	4	Advance to Division 4 semi-finals; both finalists are promoted to Division 3
3	Sligo	3	1	0	2	63	67	−4	2	Advance to Division 4 Shield Final
4	Leitrim	3	0	0	3	50	67	−17	0	

Updated to match(es) played on 30 May 2021. Source: GAA.ie
Rules for classification: Tiebreakers
(P) Promoted

==== Matches ====
===== Round 1 =====
15 May 2021 1	Louth	3-8 (17) – (18) 1-15	Antrim	Haggardstown
15:00				Venue: McGeough Park
				Referee: Barry Tiernan

16 May 2021 1	Sligo	2-19 (25) – (18) 0-18	Leitrim	Sligo
15:00				Venue: Markievicz Park
				Referee: Niall Cullen

===== Round 2 =====
23 May 2021 2	Leitrim	0-10 (10) – (19) 0-19	Louth	Carrick-on-Shannon
15:00				Venue: Páirc Seán Mac Diarmada
				Referee: Patrick Maguire

23 May 2021 2	Antrim	3-13 (22) – (21) 3-12	Sligo	Belfast
16:00				Venue: Corrigan Park
				Referee: Conor Dourneen

==== Round 3 ====
30 May 2021 3	Antrim	2-17 (23) – (22) 1-19	Leitrim	Belfast
15:00				Venue: Corrigan Park
				Referee: Kevin Faloon

30 May 2021 3	Louth	3-18 (27) – (17) 1-14	Sligo	Haggardstown
15:00				Venue: McGeough Park
				Referee: Sean Laverty

=== Division 4 South ===
==== Table ====
Pos	Team	Pld	W	D	L	PF	PA	PD	Pts	Qualification
1	Carlow	2	2	0	0	43	27	+16	4	Advance to Division 4 semi-finals; both finalists are promoted to Division 3
2	Waterford	2	1	0	1	29	43	−14	2	Advance to Division 4 semi-finals; both finalists are promoted to Division 3
3	Wexford	2	0	0	2	35	37	−2	0	Advance to Division 4 Shield Final

Updated to match(es) played on 29 May 2021. Source: GAA.ie
Rules for classification: Tiebreakers
- London, affected by the impact of the COVID-19 pandemic on Gaelic games, did not compete due to travel restrictions.

==== Matches ====
===== Round 1 =====
15 May 2021 1	Waterford	0-10 (10) – (25) 3-16	Carlow	Dungarvan
19:00				Venue: Fraher Field
		Report		Referee: John Ryan

===== Round 2 =====
22 May 2021 2	Wexford	0-18 (18) – (19) 2-13	Waterford	Wexford
15:00				Venue: Wexford Park
		Report		Referee: John Hickey

===== Round 3 =====
29 May 2021 3	Carlow	2-12 (18) – (17) 2-11	Wexford	Carlow
17:00				Venue: Dr Cullen Park
		Report		Referee: Fergal Smyth (Offaly)

=== Division 4 Shield ===
GAAGO

13 June 2021
15:00 IST (UTC+1)
Shield Final

Sligo	0-9 (9) – (21) 2-15	Wexford

O'Moore Park, Portlaoise
Referee: David Hickey

=== Division 4 Finals ===
12 June 2021
16:00 IST (UTC+1)
Semi-Final

Louth	1-23 (26) – (18) 1-15	Carlow
S. Mulroy 0-7 (5f, 1'45), C. Grimes 1-2, C. Keenan, C. Downey, C. Byrne 0-3 each, L. Jackson 0-2, E. Callaghan, B. Duffy, D. Byrne 0-1 each		P. Broderick 0-7 (2f, 2'45s), J. Clarke 1-2 (1 pen), C. Hulton 0-3, J. Moore, D. Foley, C. Blake 0-1 each

Dr Cullen Park, Carlow
Referee: Barry Tiernan (Dublin)

GK	1	Craig Lynch (Naomh Máirtin)
RCB	2	Dan Corcoran (Geraldines)
FB	3	Dermot Campbell (Dreadnots)
LCB	4	Donal McKenny (St Mary's)
RHB	5	Emmet Carolan (Newtown Blues)
CHB	6	Niall Sharkey (Glyde Rangers)
LHB	7	Eoghan Callaghan (Naomh Máirtin)
MF	8	Bevan Duffy (St Fechin's)
MF	9	Ciarán Byrne (St Mochta's)
RHF	10	Liam Jackson (St Mary's)
CHF	11	Sam Mulroy (Naomh Máirtin) (c)
LHF	12	Ciarán Downey (Newtown Blues)
RCF	13	Ciarán Keenan (St Mary's)
FF	14	Conor Grimes (Glen Emmets)
LCF	15	Ryan Burns (Hunterstown Rovers)
Substitutes:
	16	Leonard Grey (St Patrick's) for Corcoran
	17	Declan Byrne (St Mochta's) for Burns
	18	Dáire Nally (Newtown Blues) for Campbell
	19	Conall McKeever (Clan Na Gael) for Duffy
	20	John Clutterbuck (Naomh Máirtin) for Carolan

GK	1	Ciarán Cunningham (Bagenalstown Gaels)
RCB	2	Liam Roberts (Kildavin/Clonegal)
FB	3	Shane Redmond (Tinryland)
LCB	4	Seán Bambrick (Old Leighlin)
RHB	5	Seán Gannon (Éire Óg)
CHB	6	John Murphy (Grange)
LHB	7	Josh Moore (Rathvilly)
MF	8	Eoghan Ruth (Éire Óg)
MF	9	Darragh Foley (Kilbride)
RHF	10	Jordan Morrissey (Éire Óg)
CHF	11	Ross Dunphy (Éire Óg)
LHF	12	Jamie Clarke (Bagenalstown Gaels)
RCF	13	Conor Crowley (Palatine)
FF	14	Paul Broderick (Tinryland)
LCF	15	Colm Hulton (Éire Óg)
Substitutes:
	16	Chris Blake (Éire Óg) for Dunphy
	17	Cormac Mullins (Éire Óg) for Crowley
	18	Jason Kane (Palatine) for Ruth
	19	Jordan Lowry (Éire Óg) for Bambrick

GAAGO

13 June 2021
12:15 IST (UTC+1)
Semi-Final

Waterford	0-11 (11) – (18) 1-15	Antrim

Fraher Field, Dungarvan
Referee: David Murnane

Antrim and Louth shared the Division 4 title, as Louth had a championship fixture on 27 June 2021.

== League statistics ==
=== Scoring events ===
- David Tubridy (Clare) became top scorer in National Football League history against Cork in May 2021, his total score in the competition after this game (22–412, i.e. 478 points) causing him to overtake Mickey Kearins (Sligo, 1961–1978).
