= Declan Darcy =

Irish Gaelic footballer

Personal information
- Born: County Dublin, Ireland

Sport
- Sport: Gaelic football
- Position: Half-back
Clubs
- Years: Club
- Aughawillan; Clanna Gael Fontenoy
Club titles
- Dublin titles: 4
Inter-county
- Years: County
- 1988–1998 1998–2001: Leitrim; Dublin
Inter-county titles
- Connacht titles: 2 (1 under 21)

Declan Darcy (Irish: Déaglán Ó Dorchaí) is a former Gaelic footballer who played for the Leitrim and Dublin county teams. He captained Leitrim to the 1994 Connacht Senior Football Championship, he also won a Connacht Under-21 Football Championship in 1991. He won Leitrim Senior Football Championship titles in 1989, 1992, 1993, 1994 with Aughawillian and also played with St Brigid's GAA Club in Dublin. He won a Dublin Senior Club Championship and Leinster Senior Club Championship with St Brigid's in 2003.

He served as a selector of the Dublin under-21 football team for the 2009 championship season. Darcy also helped manage the St Brigid's minor team, alongside Gerry McEntee, Liam Plunkett and Mick Clerkin, to Minor 'A' Championship success in 2008, winning both Dublin and Leinster titles. He worked alongside Shane O'Hanlon and Jim Brogan.

He was a selector with Jim Gavin, who guided Dublin to the 2013 All-Ireland Senior Football Championship final after defeating Kerry in the semi-final by 3–18 to 3–11. Dublin went on to win the final on 22 September, defeating Mayo by 2–12 to 1–14. He now manages a youth in team in Clanna Gael Fontenoy.

== Honours ==
- Connacht Senior Football Championship: 1994
- Connacht Under-21 Football Championship: 1991
- All-Ireland Senior B Championship: 1990, 1991, 1992
- Leitrim Senior Football Championship: 1989, 1992, 1993, 1994
- 1 Leitrim Under-21 Football Championship
- 1 Leitrim Senior Football League
- 3 All Star nominations
- Leinster Senior Football Championship 2002
- Leinster Senior Club Football Championship 2003
- 1 Dublin Senior Football Championship
- 2 Dublin Senior League
- Irish Press Sports Star of the Year 1994
- Selector with Dublin 2013 All-Ireland Champions.
