= 2019 Leinster Senior Football Championship =

Gaelic football competition in Ireland

2019 Leinster SFC
Tournament details
- Year: 2019

Winners
- Champions: Dublin (58th win)
- Manager: Jim Gavin
- Captain: Stephen Cluxton

Runners-up
- Runners-up: Meath
- Manager: Andy McEntee
- Captain: Donal Keogan & Bryan Menton

The 2019 Leinster Senior Football Championship is the 2019 installment of the annual Leinster Senior Football Championship organised by Leinster GAA.

== Teams ==
The Leinster championship was contested by 11 of the 12 county teams in Leinster, a province of Ireland. Kilkenny was the only county team not to compete.

Team	Colours	Sponsor	Manager	Captain	Most recent success
Team	Colours	Sponsor	Manager	Captain	All-Ireland	Provincial
Carlow	Red, green and gold	Tickets.ie	Turlough O'Brien	John Murphy		1944
Dublin	Sky blue and navy	AIG	Jim Gavin	Stephen Cluxton	2018	2018
Kildare	White	Brady Family Ham	Cian O'Neill	Eoin Doyle	1928	2000
Laois	Blue and white	MW Hire Services	John Sugrue	Stephen Attride		2003
Longford	Royal blue and gold	Glennon Brothers	Padraic Davis	Donal McElligott		1968
Louth	Red and white	Morgan Fuels	Wayne Kierans	Andy McDonnell	1957	1957
Meath	Green and gold	Devenish Beyond Nutrition	Andy McEntee	Bryan Menton	1999	2010
Offaly	White, green and gold	Carroll's Cuisine	John Maughan	Anton Sullivan	1982	1997
Westmeath	Maroon and white	Renault	Colin Kelly	Kieran Martin		2004
Wexford	Purple and gold	Gain Feeds	Paul McLoughlin	Daithí Waters	1918	1945
Wicklow	Blue and gold	Arklow Bay Hotel	John Evans	Seánie Furlong

== Draw ==
The four teams who won the quarter-finals in the previous year were given byes to this year's quarter-finals. Six of the seven remaining teams play-off in the first round with the seventh team also receiving a bye to the quarter-finals.

Preliminary round 11/12 May
Louth	0-22
Wexford	1-14
Wicklow	1-10
Kildare	0-15
Meath	1-13
Offaly	0-14

Quarter-finals; 25/26 May; 2 June
Dublin	5-21
Louth	0-10
Longford (R)	3-15; 0-10
Kildare (R)	1-21; 1-18
Carlow	0-9
Meath	2-18
Laois	0-12
Westmeath	0-10

Semi-finals; 9 June
Dublin	0-26
Kildare	0-11
Meath	3-13
Laois	0-11

Final; 23 June
Dublin	1-17
Meath	0-4

== Matches ==
=== Preliminary Round ===
12 May 2019 Preliminary round	Louth	0–22 (22) – (17) 1–14	Wexford	Wexford
				Venue: Wexford Park

11 May 2019 Preliminary round	Wicklow	1-10 (13) – (15) 0–15	Kildare	Carlow
				Venue: Netwatch Cullen Park

12 May 2019 Preliminary round	Meath	1-13 (16) – (14) 0–14	Offaly	Navan
				Venue: Páirc Tailteann

=== Quarter Finals ===
25 May 2019 Quarter Final	Dublin	5-21 (36) – (10) 0–10	Louth	Portlaoise
				Venue: O'Moore Park

26 May 2019 Quarter Final	Kildare	1-21 (24) – (24) 3–15	Longford	Tullamore
				Venue: O'Connor Park

25 May 2019 Quarter Final	Carlow	0-9 (9) – (24) 2–18	Meath	Portlaoise
				Venue: O'Moore Park

26 May 2019 Quarter Final	Laois	0-12 (12) – (10) 0–10	Westmeath	Tullamore
				Venue: O'Connor Park

2 June 2019 Quarter Final Replay	Kildare	1-18 (21) – (10) 0–10	Longford	Tullamore
				Venue: O'Connor Park

=== Semi-Finals ===
9 June 2019 Semi Final	Dublin	0-26 (26) – (11) 0–11	Kildare	Dublin
				Venue: Croke Park

9 June 2019 Semi Final	Meath	3-13 (22) – (11) 0–11	Laois	Dublin
				Venue: Croke Park

=== Final ===
23 June 2019 Final	Dublin	1-17 (20) – (4) 0–4	Meath	Dublin
				Venue: Croke Park

== See also ==
- 2019 All-Ireland Senior Football Championship
  - 2019 Connacht Senior Football Championship
  - 2019 Munster Senior Football Championship
  - 2019 Ulster Senior Football Championship
