= Paddy O'Donoghue =

Paddy O'Donoghue may refer to:

- Paddy O'Donoghue (Gaelic footballer), Gaelic footballer and selector
- Paddy O'Donoghue (rugby union), former Irish rugby union international
