= Pat Gilroy =

Dublin former Gaelic footballer and manager

Personal information
- Native name: Pádraig Mac Giolla Rua (Irish)
- Born: 3 November 1971 (age 54) Dublin, Ireland
- Occupation: Managing Director
- Height: 1.93 m (6 ft 4 in)

Sport
- Sport: Gaelic football
- Position: Full Forward
Club
- Years: Club
- 1989–2008: St Vincents
Club titles
- Dublin titles: 1
- Leinster titles: 1
- All-Ireland Titles: 1
Inter-county
- Years: County
- 1992–2000: Dublin
Inter-county titles
- Leinster titles: 4
- All-Irelands: 1
- NFL: 1

Pat Gilroy (born 3 November 1971) is a former Gaelic footballer and manager, who most recently managed the senior Dublin county team (2009–2012). A former Dublin footballer himself, he led Dublin to their first All-Ireland Senior Football Championship title in 16 years in 2011.

In 2009, Gilroy's selectors were Mickey Whelan, Paul Nugent and Paddy O'Donoghue. Transplant surgeon David Hickey replaced Paul Nugent as a selector for the 2010 season., while fellow surgeon Ian Robertson replaced Mickey Whelan in 2012.

He played his club football for St Vincents. Gilroy was formerly tipped to succeed Liam Mulvihill as the GAA's Director General. Pat is the son of former Dublin footballer Jackie Gilroy. This offer never materialised as the position was eventually given to Monaghan's Paraic Duffy, who was appointed for a seven-year period.

Gilroy studied at Trinity College Dublin.

== Playing career ==
=== Club ===
Gilroy won his first Dublin Senior Football Championship medal with St Vincents in 2007 as a substitute and went on to gain a Leinster Senior Club Football Championship medal later that year. He was part of the St Vincent's team that defeated Nemo Rangers in the 2008 All Ireland Club final, where he played a pivotal role at full forward during the campaign.

=== Inter-county ===
Gilroy made his All-Ireland Senior Football Championship debut for Dublin against Offaly in Tullamore on May 31, 1992. He won an All-Ireland medal with Dublin in 1995, with an appearance as a substitute. He has four Leinster Senior Football Championship medals with Dublin, collecting them in 1992, 1993, 1994 and again in 1995. Gilroy retired from inter-county football career in July 2000.

== Managerial career ==
Pat Gilroy
Personal information
- Nickname: Giller

Sport
- Sport: Gaelic football
Inter-county management
- Years: Team
- 2008–2012: Dublin
Inter-county titles as manager
County	League	Province	All-Ireland
Dublin	1	3	3

Unlike previous Dublin football management teams, Gilroy gave his support to the club scene and encouraged his players to return and play for their clubs in between inter-county games. This move received praise from such pundits as Colm O'Rourke of Meath. In Gilroy's first season as Dublin manager, he guided Dublin to sixth position in the NFL, narrowly avoiding relegation to Division Two.

Gilroy began his 2009 All-Ireland Senior Football Championship against neighbours Meath in the Leinster Senior Football Championship quarter finals at Croke Park. Dublin defeated Meath in the game but the game proved to be a real struggle as both sides failed to impress in the game which finished 0-14 to 0-12. Dublin progressed to face Westmeath in the Leinster semi final at Croke Park. The game was very different to the previous game and Dublin dominated and proved too strong against a lacklustre Westmeath. The game finished 4-26 to 0-11 with Bernard Brogan dominating the scoring with 2-08 sending his team to the Leinster final against Kildare for a potential fifth Leinster title in a row. Dublin defeated Kildare in the Leinster final to win the Delaney Cup for the fifth year in a row in what proved to be a tight encounter. The game finished 2-15 to 0-18 with Sherlock and Cahill's goals proving the difference between the sides. This victory set up a tough quarter final against a Kerry side which had created doubts with the media due to a few bad performances against Sligo and Longford. Any doubts concerning the Kerry side were forgotten as Dublin were completely outclassed by a solid and relentless Kerry performance. The game finished 1-24 to 1-07 which proved to be their worst ever championship defeat to Kerry.

Gilroy began his 2010 All-Ireland Senior Football Championship against Wexford which proved to be a real struggle for Dublin, however they ran out as winners with the result 2-16 to 0-15. Up next they faced old neighbours Meath for the second time in a row which turned out to be a disappointing performance from Dublin with the result ending Meath 5-09 to 0-13 to end Dublin's 5th Leinster title in a row. Dublin defeated Tipperary in their first game in the qualifiers with the result 1-21 to 1-13 with goal by one of the newcomers Michael Darragh Macauley however there was still improvement to be made. Dublin defeated Armagh in their next game with the result 0-14 to 0-11. Dublin improved greatly against Leinster-finalists Louth with Eoghan O'Gara scoring two goals to send them back to the quarter-final. Dublin played Ulster Champions Tyrone and defeated them for the first time since 1995 by the result of 1-15 to 0-13. Dublin played Cork in their first Semi-final since 2007 but were narrowly defeated by one point 1-15 to 1-14.

Gilroy began his 2011 All-Ireland Senior Football Championship against Laois which turned out to be a very good display of football with the team running out winners 1-16 to 0-11. Up next they faced their opponents in the 2009 Leinster final Kildare in a tense battle with Dublin just scraping past to advance to their 2nd Leinster under Gilroy despite a great comeback from Kieran McGeeney's men. Dublin faced Wexford on 10 July 2011, in what turned out to be a very disappointing display with Dublin running out eventual winners 2-12 to 1-12. Dublin faced Tyrone in the All-Ireland Quarter final on 6 August producing a fine display of football to end the 2008 All-Ireland champion's season on a scoreline of 0-22 to 0-15. They advanced to the All-Ireland Semi-final where they faced Ulster champions Donegal on 28 August. Dublin went on to win the game against a highly disciplined Donegal side by 0-08 to 0-06 and beat Kerry in the final by 1-12 to 1-11. In November 2011, Dublin County Committee reappointed Gilroy as Manager for the 2012 season.

On 5 September 2012, Gilroy stepped down as manager of the Dublin footballers after four years in charge. Gilroy said: “It has been a challenging four years for me balancing my role with Dublin along with family and work commitments and I have decided not to continue for a further term". In November 2012, he went to New York to manage the 2011 All Stars in their game against the 2012 All Stars.

In October 2017, Gilroy was named as the new manager of the Dublin senior hurling team on a three-year term. In September 2018, Gilroy stepped down as manager of the Dublin senior hurling team after one year in charge.

Achievements
Preceded by Conor Counihan (Cork)	All-Ireland SFC winning manager 2011	Succeeded by Jim McGuinness (Donegal)
Sporting positions
Preceded by Paul Caffrey	Dublin Senior Football Manager; 2008–2012	Succeeded by Jim Gavin
