= Shane O'Hanlon =

Shane O'Hanlon (died: 10 February 2024) was an Irish Gaelic footballer, coach and selector.

== Career ==
O'Hanlon played club football with the St Vincent's club before later serving the club in a number of coaching and management roles. He was a selector when St Vincent's beat Nemo Rangers to win the All-Ireland Club SFC title in 2008. O'Hanlon later began a long association with Jim Gavin management teams when Gavin served as Dublin under-21 football team manager. During their tenure in charge, Dublin won All-Ireland U21FC titles in 2010 and 2012.

Gavin was appointed Dublin senior football team manager in 2012, with O'Hanlon joining the management team as a selector and also as logistics manager. He continued in these roles after Gavin was succeeded by Dessie Farrell in 2019. During his decade-long association with the team, Dublin remained undefeated in the Leinster SFC and won eight All-Ireland SFC titles as well as six National Football Leagues.

== Death ==
O'Hanlon died suddenly on 10 February 2024.

== Honours ==
St Vincent's

- All-Ireland Senior Club Football Championship: 2008
- Leinster Senior Club Football Championship: 2007
- Dublin Senior Football Championship: 2007

Dublin

- All-Ireland Senior Football Championship: 2013, 2015, 2016, 2017, 2018, 2019, 2020, 2023
- Leinster Senior Football Championship: 2013, 2014, 2015, 2016, 2017, 2018, 2019, 2020, 2021, 2022, 2023
- National Football League: 2013, 2014, 2015, 2016, 2018, 2021
- All-Ireland Under-21 Football Championship: 2010, 2012
- Leinster Under-21 Football Championship: 2009, 2010, 2012
