= Paul Nugent =

Paul Nugent may refer to:

- Paul Nugent (Gaelic footballer), Gaelic footballer and selector
- Paul Nugent (Scottish footballer) (born 1983), Scottish footballer currently playing for Dumbarton
