= Cathal Carolan =

Irish Gaelic footballer

Personal information
- Born: Castlebar, Ireland
- Height: 1.83 m (6 ft 0 in)

Sport
- Sport: Gaelic football
- Position: Left half forward
Club
- Years: Club
- Crossmolina Deel Rovers
Inter-county
- Years: County
- 2012-: Mayo
Inter-county titles
- Connacht titles: 1

Cathal Carolan is a Gaelic footballer who plays for Crossmolina Deel Rovers and the Mayo county team.

He made his debut in the 2013 Connacht Senior Football Championship and came on as a substitute at half-time for Tom Cunniffe in the 2013 All Ireland final where Mayo lost by a point to Dublin.
