= 2020 Mayo county football team season =

Mayo county football team
2020 season
- Manager: James Horan
- Stadium: MacHale Park, Castlebar
- NFL D1: 7th (relegated)
- All-Ireland SFC: Finalist
- Connacht SFC: Winners

The following is a summary of Mayo county football team's 2020 season. The season was suspended in March 2020 due to the COVID-19 pandemic. The season resumed in mid-October of the same year.

== Competitions ==
=== National Football League Division 1 ===
==== Table ====
| Pos | Team | Pld | W | D | L | PF | PA | PD | Pts | Qualification |
|---|---|---|---|---|---|---|---|---|---|---|
| 1 | Kerry (C) | 7 | 5 | 1 | 1 | 133 | 112 | +21 | 11 | National Football League champions |
| 2 | Dublin | 7 | 4 | 2 | 1 | 126 | 112 | +14 | 10 | Runners–up |
| 3 | Galway | 7 | 4 | 0 | 3 | 128 | 127 | +1 | 8 (Note: Head-to-head result: Galway 2-25 – 0-12 Tyrone.) | |
| 4 | Tyrone | 7 | 4 | 0 | 3 | 109 | 126 | −17 | 8 | |
| 5 | Donegal | 7 | 3 | 1 | 3 | 117 | 109 | +8 | 7 | |
| 6 | Monaghan | 7 | 2 | 2 | 3 | 113 | 114 | −1 | 6 | |
| 7 | Mayo (R) | 7 | 2 | 1 | 4 | 122 | 123 | −1 | 5 | Relegation to 2021 NFL Division 2 |
| 8 | Meath (R) | 7 | 0 | 1 | 6 | 103 | 128 | −25 | 1 | Relegation to 2021 NFL Division 2 |

Updated to match(es) played on 24 October 2020. Source: GAA.ie
Rules for classification: 1) League points 2) Where only two teams are involved, the outcome of the meeting of the two teams in the competition 3) Scoring Difference 4) Highest Total Score For 5) A Play-Off.
(C) League champions; (R) Relegated

==== Reports ====
| 25 January 2020 1 | Donegal | 0-19 (19) – (19) 2-13 | Mayo | Ballybofey |
| 19:15 GMT (UTC+0) | | | | Venue: MacCumhaill Park |
| | | Report | | Referee: David Coldrick (Meath) |

| 1 February 2020 2 | Mayo | 0-08 (08) – (14) 1-11 | Dublin | Castlebar |
| 19:00 GMT (UTC+0) | | | | Venue: MacHale Park |
| | | Report | | Referee: Barry Cassidy (Derry) |

| 9 February 2020 3 | Meath | 2-05 (11) – (12) 1-09 | Mayo | Navan |
| 14:00 GMT (UTC+0) | | | | Venue: Páirc Tailteann |
| | | | | Referee: Sean Hurson (Tyrone) |

| 23 February 2020 4 | Monaghan | 2-16 (22) – (13) 0-13 | Mayo | Clones |
| 14:00 GMT (UTC+0) | | | | Venue: St Tiernach's Park |
| | | | | Referee: Anthony Nolan (Wicklow) |

| 1 March 2020 5 | Mayo | 1-13 (16) – (17) 1-14 | Kerry | Castlebar |
| 13:30 GMT (UTC+0) | | | | Venue: MacHale Park |
| | | | | Referee: Martin McNally (Monaghan) |

| 18 October 2020 6 | Galway | 0-17 (17) – (32) 3-23 | Mayo | Salthill |
| 14:00 IST (UTC+1) | | | | Venue: Pearse Stadium |
| | | | | Referee: Maurice Deegan (Laois); TV: TG4 |

| 25 October 2020 7 | Mayo | 1-19 (22) – (23) 3-14 | Tyrone | Castlebar |
| 14:00 GMT (UTC+0) | | | | Venue: MacHale Park |
| | | | | Referee: Niall Cullen (Fermanagh) |

=== Connacht Senior Football Championship ===
==== Fixtures ====
| 1 November 2020 Quarter-final | Leitrim | 0–10 (10) – (21) 2–15 | Mayo | Carrick-on-Shannon |
| 13:15 GMT (UTC+0) | | (HT: 0-06 – 1-06) | | Venue: Páirc Seán Mac Diarmada |
| | Pts: K Beirne 5 (5f), C Dolan 1, S Quinn 1, E Sweeney 1, D Flynn 1, D Casey 1. | Report | Gls: C O'Connor 1, T Conroy 1. Pts: C O’Connor 9 (4f, 2 ’45), A O’Shea 2, B Walsh 1, M Runae 1, J Carr 1, C Loftus 1. | Referee: Paul Faloon (Down); Attendance: 0 TV: RTÉ News Now |

| 8 November 2020 Semi-final | Roscommon | 0–13 (13) – (19) 1–16 | Mayo | Roscommon |
| 13:30 GMT (UTC±0) | | (HT: 0-05 – 1-08) | | Venue: Dr Hyde Park |
| | Pts: C Cox 2 (1m, 1f), C McKeon 2 (2f), D Smith 3 (1f); D Murtagh 2; N Daly 1, T O'Rourke 1. | Report | Gls: D O’Connor 1 Pts: C O'Connor 9 (6f); P Durcan 2; A O'Shea 1, T Conroy 1, K McLoughlin 1, C Loftus 1, D O'Connor 1. | Referee: David Gough (Meath); Attendance: 0 TV: RTÉ |

RTÉ

15 November 2020
13:30 GMT (UTC+0)
Final

Report

| Galway | 0-13 (13) – (14) 0-14 | Mayo |
|---|---|---|
(HT: 0-05 - 0-08)
| Pts: S Walsh 7 (4f), P Conroy 3, D Conneely 1, P Kelly 1, G O’Donnell 1. | | Pts: C O’Connor 4 (2f), T Conroy 3, M Ruane 2, B Walsh 2, P Durcan 1, D O’Connor 1, R O’Donoghue 1. |

Pearse Stadium, Galway
Referee: Sean Hurson (Tyrone)
Attendance: 0

==== Bracket ====
Quarter-finals
Mayo | 2-15
Leitrim | 0-10

Semi-finals
Galway | w/o
Sligo | conc
Roscommon | 0-13
Mayo | 1-16

Final
Galway | 0-13
Mayo | 0-14

=== All-Ireland Senior Football Championship ===
RTÉ
Sky Sports

6 December 2020
15:30 GMT (UTC+0)
Semi-Final

Report

| Mayo | 5–20 (35) – (22) 3–13 | Tipperary |
|---|---|---|
(HT: 4–12 – 1-05)
| Gls: C O'Connor 4, D O'Connor 1. Pts: C O’Connor 9 (6fs); T Conroy 4 (1m); D Coen 2; M Ruane 1, P Durcan 1, K McLoughlin 1, A O’Shea 1, C Loftus 1. | | Gls: C Sweeney 1, B Fox 1, P Feehan 1. Pts: C Sweeney 9 (8fs); C O’Riordan 2; S O’Brien 1, K Fahey 1. |

Croke Park, Dublin
Referee: David Gough (Meath)
Attendance: 0 (Note: The game was played behind closed doors due to the impact of the COVID-19 pandemic on Gaelic games.)

RTÉ
Sky Sports

19 December 2020
17:00 GMT (UTC+0)
Final

Report

| Dublin | 2–14 (20) – (15) 0–15 | Mayo |
|---|---|---|
(HT: 2-06 – 0–10)
| Gls: D Rock 1, C O'Callaghan 1. Pts: D Rock 4 (fs); C Kilkenny 3; C O'Callaghan 1, S Bugler 1, P Small 1, N Scully 1, B Fenton 1, P Mannion 1 (f), B Howard 1. | | Pts: C O’Connor 9 (5fs, 2ms); R O’Donoghue 2; O Mullen 1, C Loftus 1, S Coen 1 (m), D Coen 1. |

Croke Park, Dublin
Referee: D Coldrick (Meath)
Attendance: 0

== Management team ==
As of December 2020:

- Manager: James Horan
- Coach–selectors: James Burke, Ciarán McDonald
- Selector: Martin Lally
- Goalkeeping coach: Tom Higgins
- Strength and conditioning coach: Conor Finn
- Statistics: Jack Murray, Evan Gannon
- Team doctor: Seán Moffatt
- Physiotherapists: Mark Gallagher, Brendan Butler, Darren Flannery
- Kitman: Liam Ludden
- Logistics: Joe Doyle
- Nutritionist: Evan Regan
- Performance coach: Martin McIntyre
- Values and behaviours coach: Ger Cafferkey
- Player welfare: Noel Howley
