= Ian Robertson (Gaelic footballer) =

Irish Gaelic footballer

Personal information
- Native name: Ian Mac Roibeaird (Irish)
- Born: Dublin, Ireland
- Occupation: Trainee surgeon

Sport
- Sport: Gaelic football
- Position: Full Back
Club
- Years: Club
- ? -present: Ballymun Kickhams
Inter-county
- Years: County
- 1993-2005: Dublin
Inter-county titles
- Leinster titles: Leinster
- All Stars: 0

Ian Robertson is a former Gaelic footballer who played for the Ballymun Kickhams club and for the Dublin county team. Robertson retired from inter-county football due to an injury in 2008 which dramatically affected his fluency of movement. He was part of the 2012 Dublin senior management team. He was a selector with the 2013 Dublin senior team.

== Playing career ==
Robertson's final championship appearance was in Dublin's 2004 All-Ireland quarter-final defeat to Kerry. He did appear for Dublin again but had to give up again due to injury. Robertson captained Dublin to the 1993 Leinster Minor Football Championship before losing to Galway in the All-Ireland semi-final. He also played at under-21 level in the No 9 jersey. Robertson made his championship debut under Mickey Whelan in a game against local rivals Meath in 1997. Robertson played at full-back in the game along with his club-mate at Ballymun Kickhams, Paddy Christie.
