= Paddy O'Donoghue (Gaelic footballer) =

Irish Gaelic footballer

Paddy O'Donoghue was a selector for the Dublin senior football team, along with Mickey Whelan, for former manager Pat Gilroy from 2009 to 2012 winning an All Ireland in 2011. He was also a Dublin hurling selector under Pat Gilroy's management in 2017. He was formerly a player for both his county team (Dublin) and his club Kilmacud Crokes.

He won three Dublin Senior Football Championship medals with Kilmacud Crokes in 1992, 1994 and 1998. He also won a Leinster Club SFC with Crokes in 1994. He won an All-Ireland Club SFC medal with Crokes in 1995; after the final, he received the man of the match award. He also captained Trinity College Dublin to their first Ryan Cup in the 1998–89 season. He played with Dublin during the early nineties.

Prior to his appointment as Dublin selector, O'Donoghue was manager of the Kilmacud Crokes minor football team.

He is the manager of Kilmacud Crokes Senior Ladies Football team and he has led them to three Dublin and Leinster Senior club championships in 2022,2023 and 2024.
