= Philips Sports Manager of the Year 2009 =

Edition of sports award

The Philips Sports Manager of the Year Awards for 2009 were held on Wednesday, 9 December at the Shelbourne Hotel, Dublin. Declan Kidney won the award for the second consecutive year after guiding Ireland to their first Six Nations Championship since 1985, and their first Grand Slam since 1948, following up with an unbeaten autumn season against Australia, Argentina and Fiji. Kidney had won the monthly award twice during the year.

Also honoured for their achievements in 2009 were Heineken Cup-winning coach with Leinster Rugby Michael Cheika, League of Ireland-winning manager Pat Fenlon, GAA managers Brian Cody, Jack O'Connor, Conor Counihan and Mick O'Dwyer, plus Ireland soccer manager Giovanni Trapattoni, whose side reached the FIFA World Cup play-offs, only to go out in controversial circumstances.

== Philips Sports Manager of the Month 2009 Winners ==
Month	Winner	Team and sport
Dec 2008	John Brudair	Dromcollogher-Broadford GAA
Jan	Mark Scannell	Cork women's basketball
Feb	Declan Kidney	Ireland rugby
Mar	Declan Kidney	Ireland rugby
Apr	Phil Simmons	Ireland cricket
May	Michael Cheika	Leinster Rugby
Jun	John Oxx	Racing, trainer of Sea The Stars
Jul	Mick O'Dwyer	Wicklow football
Aug	Conor Counihan	Cork football
Sept	Brian Cody & Jack O'Connor	Kilkenny hurling & Kerry football
Oct	Pat Fenlon	Bohemians soccer
Nov	Giovanni Trapattoni	Ireland soccer
