= Enda Varley =

Mayo Gaelic footballer

Personal information
- Native name: Éanna Mac an Bhearlaigh (Irish)
- Born: Castlebar, Ireland
- Occupation: Teacher
- Height: 1.75 m (5 ft 9 in)

Sport
- Sport: Gaelic football
- Position: Right corner-forward
Clubs
- Years: Club
- ?–? ?–? 2021–: Garrymore; St Vincent's; Garrymore
Inter-county
- Years: County
- 2010–2014? 15?: Mayo
Inter-county titles
- Connacht titles: 4

Enda Varley is a Gaelic footballer who played at senior level for the Mayo county team. He has played with the Garrymore and St Vincent's clubs, transferring there from his native club.

Varley started at right corner-forward and scored two points in the 2012 All-Ireland SFC final, which Mayo lost by four points to Donegal.

He also played in the 2013 All-Ireland Senior Football Championship final, but was unexpectedly left out of the county panel in 2015. A teacher by profession, Varley transferred back to Garrymore in 2021 after five years with St Vincent's, winning Dublin SFC and Leinster Club SFC titles in 2016 and retaining the Dublin SFC title in 2017, while playing alongside Diarmuid Connolly and Tomás Quinn.
