= Dessie Farrell =

Gaelic footballer and manager

Personal information
- Born: Dublin, Ireland
- Height: 5 ft 10.5 in (1.79 m)

Sport
- Sport: Gaelic football
- Position: Forward
Club
- Years: Club
- 1980–2009: Na Fianna
Inter-county**
Years	County	Apps (scores)
1990–2005	Dublin	44 (3–58)
Inter-county titles
- Leinster titles: 6
- All-Irelands: 1
- All Stars: 1
Inter-county management
- Years: Team
- 2011–2012 2012–2018 2019–2025: Dublin minor Dublin under-21 Dublin
	2	5	5
- **Inter County team apps and scores correct as of (00:03, 6 September 2006 (UTC)).

Dessie Farrell is an Irish Gaelic football coach and former player. He was manager of the Dublin county team between 2019 and 2025.

A former All Star Gaelic footballer who played at senior level for Dublin county team for nearly 15 years, he retired from county football in 2005 and spent another four years playing with his club Na Fianna. Having won an All-Ireland with Dublin in 1995, Farrell went on to captain his county, winning six Leinster championships, a National League title and three county championships with his club. He managed the Dublin minor football team in 2011 and 2012 and was named manager of the Na Fianna senior team in 2018. He was confirmed as Dublin senior football team manager on 12 December 2019, succeeding Jim Gavin on a three-year contract.

Outside playing and coaching, Farrell was chief executive and founder member of the Gaelic Players Association (GPA), the official representative body for inter-county footballers and hurlers.

== Playing career ==
Farrell made his senior championship debut for Dublin against Offaly on 31 May 1992 in Tullamore and went on to appear in the 1992 All-Ireland Senior Football Championship Final. This was a particularly difficult game for Farrell, as the opponent was Donegal and Farrell has family roots in Donegal, his "second home". Noel Hegarty, whom he knew well, marked him in that game. A talented minor footballer who reached an All-Ireland MFC final in 1988, Farrell was called onto the senior panel in 1990 but suffered a serious setback when he ruptured his cruciate knee ligament in a club game and missed Dublin's four-game series against Meath in 1991. However, having returned to action, he had an illustrious career for Dublin at senior level, winning an All-Ireland Senior Football Championship (SFC) title, six Leinster Senior Football Championship (SFC) medals, a National Football League (NFL) title and, also, captaining the side for three years. He scored a total of 67 (3–58) points for Dublin in championship football. A high point of Farrell's playing career was his performance against Meath in the 1995 Leinster final, when Dublin defeated archrival Meath by ten points. Dublin advanced to win a first All-Ireland SFC title since 1983, with Farrell once again prominent in the final, when he scored four points.

Farrell won an All-Star, at centre-forward, for his role in Dublin's All-Ireland SFC win in 1995. He won six Leinster SFC medals with Dublin, which he received in 1992, 1993, 1994, 1995, 2002 and 2005, as well as a Leinster MFC and an NFL title. As a Dublin senior footballer he played under seven different management teams: Gerry McCaul, Paddy Cullen, Pat O'Neill, Mickey Whelan, Tommy Carr, Tommy Lyons and Paul 'Pillar' Caffrey.

As well as representing Dublin football at minor, under-21 and senior levels, Farrell also captained the Dublin under-21 hurlers in 1992. He was educated at St. Vincent's C.B.S., Glasnevin.

A detailed account of his playing career is recorded in his autobiography, which was released on 30 November 2005, the same night Farrell announced his official retirement from inter-county football. The book, titled Dessie Tangled Up In Blue, was co-written with Seán Potts. Farrell was named on the 2006 Dublin Bus/Evening Herald Blue Star football XV as a substitute.

== Gaelic Players Association ==
Dessie Farrell was the chief executive of the Gaelic Players Association (GPA), the representative body for Ireland's leading GAA players from 2003 until 2016. A founder member in 1999, Farrell has been a driving force in the development of the organisation which now has over 2,300 current playing members and a growing past player membership. In November 2000, the GPA's first annual general meeting took place in Killarney, County Kerry, where Farrell was elected as chairman. At the same inaugural event, former Kerry footballer Séamus Moynihan was elected Secretary, former Clare hurler Jamesie O'Connor was elected president and Ciarán McArdle was elected treasurer. Appointed CEO in 2003, Farrell oversaw the rapid growth of the organisation and helped negotiate Government funding for players in 2007. He was the players representative on the GAA's Central Council for five years and was also the lead negotiator in the GPA team which reached a formal agreement with the GAA in 2009; the GPA was ratified as the official representative body for county players at GAA Congress 2010. A long-term comprehensive agreement between both bodies was reached in November 2010 which now provides annual funding for the GPA's Player Development Programme designed to assist amateur county players with their off-field careers.

Farrell stepped down as CEO of the GPA in December 2016.

== Coaching and management ==
After retiring from county football in 2005, Farrell was appointed as lead coach for a Dublin Football Development Squad.

He took his first coaching session in 2007.

He became minor Football manager in 2011. After winning the Leinster championship, he led his team to an All-Ireland Minor Football Championship final in his first year where they lost narrowly to Tipperary in an eventful game. He later managed the Dublin minors to an All-Ireland MFC title, defeating Meath in the final at Croke Park in September 2012. He left his position as minor manager after that game and was ratified as under-21 team manager in November 2012. In farrell's second year in charge, Dublin won the 2014 All-Ireland Under-21 Football Championship, defeating Roscommon at O'Connor Park in Tullamore. Farrell later managed Dublin to a second victory in that competition, defeating Galway in the 2017 All-Ireland Under-21 Football Championship final.

Farrell also worked as a performance coach for the Dublin senior hurling team under the management of Mattie Kenny.

In December 2019, the Dublin GAA county committee appointed Farrell as manager of the Dublin senior county footballers for a three-year term, succeeding Jim Gavin. The appointment was announced at Parnell Park during the 2019 annual convention.

Farrell announced his departure as manager in June 2025, with Dublin having exited the 2025 Championship to Tyrone at the quarter-final stage.

=== Suspension ===
On 1 April 2021, amid the COVID-19 pandemic in the Republic of Ireland, the Irish Independent published photographs of a coach-led group of Dublin team members, including All Stars Footballer of the Year Brian Fenton, whom it reported had gathered at Innisfails GAA club before 7am on the previous morning. The session occurred around 12 hours after the GAA sent a note to each club and county, warning that any club or county team ignoring the collective training ban could risk putting the GAA's intentions to return to action "in serious jeopardy". That evening, after investigating the accuracy of the report, Dublin GAA suspended Farrell for 12 weeks with immediate effect. The incident provoked much public commentary from politicians and sportspeople. Former Dublin camogie team manager Frank Browne called for Farrell's resignation as Dublin manager for the "arrogance" of his team's behaviour, adding: "I think it's a cop out to say they're amateur players. We're all amateur players involved in the GAA, we all know right from wrong and it was wrong".

== Hockey ==
Farrell played hockey for the Ireland under-21 international squad. He continued to play throughout his Dublin GAA career, including for St Brendan's Phoenix Park hockey club.

== Personal life ==
Farrell's mother Anne (née Carr) came from Crove between Glengesh and Meenaneary in County Donegal. He is a first cousin of Séamus Coleman, whose aunt is Farrell's mother.

He is a trained psychiatric nurse.

== Honours ==
=== Player ===
Dublin

- All-Ireland Senior Football Championship (1): 1995
- Leinster Senior Football Championship (6): 1992, 1993, 1994, 1995, 2002, 2005
- National Football League (1): 1992-93

Na Fianna

- Leinster Senior Club Football Championship (1): 1999-2000
- Dublin Senior Football Championship (3): 1999, 2000, 2001

=== Manager ===
Dublin

- All-Ireland Senior Football Championship (2): 2020, 2023
- Leinster Senior Football Championship (5): 2020, 2021, 2022, 2023, 2024
- National Football League (1):2021

=== Individual ===
- All Star Awards (1): 1995

Sporting positions
Preceded by Keith Barr	Dublin Senior Football Captain; 1998–2001	Succeeded by Coman Goggins
Preceded by Jim Gavin	Dublin Senior Football Manager; 2019–2025	Succeeded by Ger Brennan
