= 2019 Ulster Senior Football Championship =

2019 Ulster SFC
Tournament details
- Year: 2019
- Trophy: Anglo-Celt Cup

Winners
- Champions: Donegal (10th win)
- Manager: Declan Bonner
- Captain: Michael Murphy

Runners-up
- Runners-up: Cavan
- Manager: Mickey Graham
- Captain: Raymond Galligan

Other
- Matches played: 9
- Top Scorer: Rian O'Neill (0-18)

The 2019 Ulster Senior Football Championship is the 131st instalment of the annual Ulster Senior Football Championship organised by Ulster GAA. It is one of the four provincial competitions of the 2019 All-Ireland Senior Football Championship. The winners receive The Anglo-Celt Cup. The draw for the championship was made on 12 October 2018.

Donegal were the defending champions, and successfully retained their title, defeating Cavan in the final.

== Teams ==
The Ulster championship is contested by the nine county teams in the province of Ulster.

Team	Colours	Sponsor	Manager	Captain	Most recent success
Team	Colours	Sponsor	Manager	Captain	All-Ireland	Provincial
Antrim	Saffron and white	Creagh Concrete	Lenny Harbinson	Declan Lynch		1951
Armagh	Orange and white	Simply Fruit	Kieran McGeeney	Rory Grugan	2002	2008
Cavan	Royal blue and white	Kingspan Group	Mickey Graham	Raymond Galligan	1952	1997
Derry	Red and white	H&A Mechanical Services	Damian McErlain	Enda Lynn	1993	1998
Donegal	Gold and green	KN Group	Declan Bonner	Michael Murphy	2012	2018
Down	Red and black	EOS IT Solutions	Paddy Tally	Darren O'Hagan	1994	1994
Fermanagh	Green and white	Tracey Concrete	Rory Gallagher	Eoin Donnelly
Monaghan	White and blue	Investec	Malachy O'Rourke	Drew Wylie		2015
Tyrone	White and Red	Tyrone Fabrication	Mickey Harte	Mattie Donnelly	2008	2017

== Championship draw ==
Preliminary round 12 May 2019
Tyrone	1-19
Derry	1-13

Quarter-finals; 18, 19, 25, 26 May 2019
Cavan	1-13
Monaghan	0-12
Down	3-13
Armagh	2-17
Fermanagh	0-09
Donegal	0-15
Antrim	2-09
Tyrone	2-23

Semi-finals; 2 & 8 June 2019
Cavan (R)	0-17; 0-23
Armagh (R)	1-14; 0-17
Donegal	1-16
Tyrone	0-15

Final; 23 June 2019
Cavan	2-16
Donegal	1-24

== Matches ==
=== Preliminary round ===
BBC Northern Ireland
deferred

12 May 2019
16:00 IST (UTC+1)
Preliminary Round

Report

Tyrone	1-19 (22) – (16) 1-13	Derry
(HT: 0-10 – 0-7)
Gls: Darren McCurry 1 Pts: Cathal McShane 7 (2f), Peter Harte 3 (3f), Richard Donnelly 2, Michael Cassidy 2, Padraig Hampsey 1, Michael McKernan 1, Hugh Pat McGeary 1, Frank Burns 1, Connor McAliskey 1		Gls: Shane McGuigan 1 Pts: Shane McGuigan 6 (5f), Ryan Bell 3 (3f), Christopher Bradley 2, Conor McAtamney 1, Ciaran McFaul 1

Healy Park, Omagh
Referee: Paddy Neilan (Roscommon)
Attendance: 10,116

=== Quarter-finals ===
Sky Sports

18 May 2019
19:00 IST (UTC+1)
Quarter-Final A

Report

Cavan	1-13 (16) – (12) 0-12	Monaghan
(HT: 1-08 – 0-04)
Gls: Martin Reilly 1 (1p); Pts: Gearoid McKiernan 4 (2f), Niall Murray 2, Conor Rehill 1, Conor Brady 1, Dara McVeety 1, Conor Madden 1, Christopher Conroy 1		Pts: Conor McManus 4 (3f), Rory Beggan 2 (1 '45', 1f), Shane Carey 2, Kieran Hughes 1 (1f), Conor Boyle 1, Conor McCarthy 1

Breffni Park, Cavan
Referee: Conor Lane (Cork)
Attendance: 13,496

BBC NI

19 May 2019
16:00 IST (UTC+1)
Quarter-Final B

Report

Down	3-13 (22) – (23) 2-17 (a.e.t.)	Armagh
(HT: 1-05 – 0-07) (FT: 2-10 – 1-13)
Gls: Donal O'Hare 1, Paul Devlin 1, Pat Havern 1 Pts: Donal O'Hare 2 (2f), Paul Devlin 2 (2f), James Guinness 2, Jerome Johnston 2 (1f), Pat Havern 1, Conor Poland 1, Conor Francis 1, Connaire Harrison 1, Barry O'Hagan 1		Gls: Mark Shields 1, Andrew Murnin 1 Pts: Rian O'Neill 8 (4f), Jamie Clarke 2, Ryan Kennedy 2, Stefan Campbell 2, Aidan Nugent 1, James Morgan 1, Andrew Murnin 1

Páirc Esler, Newry
Referee: Anthony Nolan (Wicklow)
Attendance: 15,116

BBC NI

26 May 2019
14:00 IST (UTC+1)
Quarter-Final C

Report

Fermanagh	0-09 (09) – (15) 0-15	Donegal
(HT: 0-4 – 0-5)
Pts: Ultan Kelm 2, Conall Jones 2 (2f), Ciaran Corrigan 2, Ryan Jones 1, Seán Quigley 1, Barry Mulrone 1		Pts: Patrick McBrearty 5 (2f), Jamie Brennan 4, Michael Murphy 2, Michael Langan 1, Jason McGee 1, Leo McLoone 1, Ciarán Thompson 1

Brewster Park, Enniskillen
Referee: Joe McQuillan (Cavan)
Attendance: 10,447

BBC NI

25 May 2019
18:00 IST (UTC+1)
Quarter-Final D

Report

Antrim	2-09 (15) – (29) 2-23	Tyrone
(HT: 0-5 – 1-16)
Gls: Matthew Fitzpatrick 1, Patrick McCormick 1 Pts: Ryan Murray 6 (4f), Patrick McBride 2, James McAuley 1		Gls: Connor McAliskey 1, Tiernan McCann 1, Pts: Cathal McShane 6 (4f), Connor McAliskey 2 (1f), Richard Donnelly 3, Mattie Donnelly 3, Ronan McNamee 1, Rory Brennan 1, Michael Cassidy 1, Niall Sludden 1, Frank Burns 1, Kyle Coney 1, Darren McCurry 1, Niall Morgan 1 (1 '45')

Athletic Grounds, Armagh
Referee: Maurice Deegan (Laois)
Attendance: 5,409

=== Semi-finals ===
BBC NI

2 June 2019
16:00 IST (UTC+1)
Semi-Final 1

Report

Cavan	0-17 (17) – (17) 1-14 (a.e.t.)	Armagh
(HT: 0-7 – 0-7) (FT: 0-16 – 1-13)
Pts: Niall Murray 5 (4f), Cian Mackey 3, Gearoid McKiernan 2 (2f), Dara McVeety 2, Stephen Murray 2, Christopher Conroy 1, Conor Moynagh 1, Gerard Smith 1		Gls: Jarlath Óg Burns 1 Pts: Rian O'Neill 4 (3f), Jarlath Óg Burns 2, Aidan Nugent 2, Paul Hughes 1, Jemar Hall 1, Stefan Campbell 1, Joe McElroy 1, Jamie Clarke 1 (1f)

St Tiernach's Park, Clones
Referee: Derek O'Mahoney (Tipperary)
Attendance: 16,716

BBC NI
deferred

9 June 2019
16:00 IST (UTC+1)
Semi-Final 1 Replay

Report

Cavan	0-23 (23) – (17) 0-17	Armagh
(HT: 0-11 – 0-08)
Pts: Niall Murray 5 (4f), Dara McVeety 4, Raymond Galligan 3 (3f), Gearoid McKiernan 3, Conor Moynagh 2, Martin Reilly 1, Killian Clarke 1, Conor Rehill 1, Oisin Kiernan 1, Oisin Pierson 1, Cian Mackey 1		Pts: Jamie Clarke 7 (3f), Rian O’Neill 6 (4f), Stefan Campbell 2, Mark Shields 1, Rory Grugan 1

St Tiernach's Park, Clones
Referee: Paddy Neilan (Roscommon)
Attendance: 21,192

RTÉ
BBC NI Deferred

8 June 2019
17:00 IST (UTC+1)
Semi-Final 2

Report

Donegal	1-16 (19) – (15) 0-15	Tyrone
(HT: 1-9 – 0-5)
Gls: Jamie Brennan 1 Pts: Michael Murphy 5 (2f, 1 '45'), Jamie Brennan 3, Patrick McBrearty 3 (1f), Ryan McHugh 1, Michael Langan 1, Eoin McHugh 1, Hugh McFadden 1, Stephen McMenamin 1		Pts: Cathal McShane 4 (3f), Darren McCurry 3 (1f), Richard Donnelly 2, Kieran McGeary 2, Niall Morgan 2 (1f, 1 '45'), Michael Cassidy 1, Mattie Donnelly 1

Breffni Park, Cavan
Referee: David Gough (Meath)
Attendance: 13,579

=== Final ===
RTÉ
BBC NI

23 June 2019
14:00 IST (UTC+1)
Final

Report

Cavan	2-16 (22) – (27) 1-24	Donegal
(HT: 0-5 – 0-13)
Gls: Conor Madden 1, Stephen Murray 1 Pts: Gearoid McKiernan 6 (2f), Dara McVeety 3, Conor Moynagh 1, Conor Brady 1, Oisin Pierson 1, Conor Madden 1, Cian Mackey 1, Caoimhin O'Reilly 1, Jack Brady 1		Gls: Jamie Brennan 1 Pts: Patrick McBrearty 5 (1f), Jamie Brennan 4, Michael Murphy 4 (2f), Jason McGee 2, Ciarán Thompson 2, Ryan McHugh 1, Eoghan Bán Gallagher 1, Hugh McFadden 1, Niall O'Donnell 1, Michael Langan 1, Daire Ó Baoill 1, Oisín Gallen 1

St Tiernach's Park, Clones
Referee: Conor Lane (Cork)
Attendance: 28,780

== Attendance ==
Total attendance
134,851
Average attendance
14,983
Highest attendance
28,780
Cavan 2–16 – 1–24 Donegal
23 June 2019

== See also ==
- 2019 All-Ireland Senior Football Championship
  - 2019 Connacht Senior Football Championship
  - 2019 Leinster Senior Football Championship
  - 2019 Munster Senior Football Championship
