= Jackie Gilroy =

Dublin Gaelic footballer

Personal information
- Native name: Seán Mac Giolla Rua (Irish)
- Born: Drumcondra, County Dublin, Ireland

Sport
- Sport: Gaelic football
- Position: ?
Club
- Years: Club
- ?-?: St Vincents
Inter-county
- Years: County
- ?-?: Dublin
Inter-county titles
- Leinster titles: ?

Jackie Gilroy (1942 – 25 February 2007) was a Gaelic footballer who played for St Vincents and the Dublin county team. He was born in Drumcondra, County Dublin. He won an All-Ireland medal with Dublin in 1963 as part of the Dublin senior football panel. Dublin defeated Galway in the final at Croke Park. Jackie won the All-Ireland Minor Football Championship with Dublin in 1958. Gilroy was the chairman of St Vincents GAA club from 1973 until 1977. He was the club secretary between 1978 and 1979 and then became the chairman again for the term 1988 to 1989. Jackie spent his working life working in newspaper production. Jackie was the father of former Dublin senior football manager Pat Gilroy.
