= Cathal McShane =

Tyrone Gaelic footballer

Personal information
- Date of birth: 2 November 1995 (age 30)

Team information
- Current team: Tyrone county football team

Cathal McShane (born 2 November 1995) a footballer who plays at Owen roes and Tyrone. McShane has an All Ireland Senior Football Championship winning medal as a member of the Tyrone GAA team in the 2021 season.

McShane was the highest scoring player in the 2019 All-Ireland Senior Football Championship.
