= John Brudair =

Limerick

Personal information
- Occupations: Gaelic football and hurling manager

Sport
- Sport: Gaelic football, Hurling
Club management
- Years: Club
- 2018-: Kilmallock
Inter-county management
- Years: Team
- 2013-2016: Limerick

John Brudair is a Gaelic football and hurling manager. He was appointed manager of the Limerick county football team in 2013. He managed the team until 2016, when he stepped down.

While managing Limerick in 2016, Brudair chose St Conleth's Park in Newbridge ahead of Croke Park when it came to the important choice of football versus an All-Ireland senior camogie final which had a team in it that he was also managing on the side, showing his commitment and dedication to the development of Limerick football over camogie. Brudair told the press at the time: "My priority is with Limerick at the moment and hopefully I can get to some of the camogie after."

He teamed up with Fitzgibbon Cup winning manager Jamie Wall in 2018 to manage 2014–15 All-Ireland Senior Club Hurling Championship finalists Kilmallock.

== Honours ==
- Philips Sports Manager of the Year 2009

Preceded by Maurice Horan	Limerick Senior Football Manager; 2013–2016	Succeeded by Billy Lee
