= Maurice Horan =

Irish Gaelic footballer and manager

Personal information
- Native name: Muiris Ó hÓráin (Irish)
- Born: 1976 (age 49–50) Ballinrobe, County Mayo, Ireland

Sport
- Sport: Gaelic football
- Position: Full-forward
Clubs
- Years: Club
- 1994–2003 2004–: Ballinrobe; Monaleen
Club titles
- Limerick titles: 1
Inter-county
- Years: County
- 2003 2004: Mayo; Limerick
Inter-county titles
- Munster titles: 0
- All-Irelands: 0
- NFL: 0
- All Stars: 0

Maurice Horan (born 1976) is an Irish Gaelic football manager and former player. He is a former manager of the senior Limerick county team.

Horan experienced a relatively unsuccessful playing career at the club level with Ballinrobe and Monaleen and at the inter-county level with Mayo and Limerick. He was a full-forward for both club and county; however, his career ended without any provincial success in either Connacht or Munster.

Immediately after retiring from inter-county activity, Horan became involved in team management. He served as the manager of the Limerick under-21 football team for a period. Horan was appointed as manager of the Limerick senior football team in October 2010. He resigned in July 2013.

Ahead of the 2020 season, he joined the Laois backroom team as a coach.

Sporting positions
Preceded by Mickey 'Ned' O'Sullivan	Limerick Senior Football Manager; 2010–2013	Succeeded by John Brudair
