= Ger Cafferkey =

Mayo Gaelic footballer

Personal information
- Native name: Gearóid Mac Eafarcaigh (Irish)
- Born: 5 August 1987 (age 39) Castlebar, Ireland
- Occupation: Engineer
- Height: 1.88 m (6 ft 2 in)

Sport
- Sport: Gaelic football
- Position: Full back
Club
- Years: Club
- 2004–: Ballina Stephenites
College
- Years: College
- NUI Galway
Inter-county
Years	County	Apps (scores)
2009–2019	Mayo	104 (0–0)
Inter-county titles
- Connacht titles: 6
- All-Irelands: 0
- NFL: 1
- All Stars: 1

Ger Cafferkey (born 5 August 1987) is a former Gaelic footballer who plays for Ballina Stephenites and the Mayo county team.

== Playing career ==
Cafferkey studied at NUI Galway. While there he played for the university team.

Cafferkey played in the 2006 All-Ireland Minor Football Championship final loss to Down. He won three Connacht Under-21 Football Championships between 2006 and 2008. He also won an All-Ireland Under-21 Football Championship in 2006, while playing at full back. He first played senior championship for his county in 2009 against New York. His first of six Connacht Senior Football Championship (SFC) medals followed in his first season.

Cafferkey started at full back in the 2012 All-Ireland Senior Football Championship final, which Mayo lost by 0-13 to 2-11 against Donegal. Cafferkey also started at full back in the 2013 All-Ireland Senior Football Championship final, but Mayo lost again, this time by a single point, in this case to Dublin.

Cafferkey was named in the 2012 All Star football team in the full-back position. He was nominated again the following year, though did not win.

Cafferkey sustained a serious hamstring injury in 2016.

Cafferkey announced his retirement from inter-county football via social media on Monday 9 September 2019, having made 104 appearances in league and championship for his county team. Due to his preference for defence he never scored for Mayo in either the league or the championship. His last appearance was against Dublin at Croke Park in the 2019 National Football League, having won the man of the match award in the previous game against Cavan, but limping off the field at Croke Park in the first half with one of his customary hamstring injuries, and then having his championship season curtailed by injury. Cafferkey's announcement followed swiftly from a similar one by Andy Moran.

Cafferkey did not seek the media spotlight. He only twice appeared before the media: in 2013 (the league defeat of Kerry) and 2019 (the previously mentioned league game against Cavan) to collect two man of the match awards.

== Honours ==
=== Team ===
- All-Ireland Senior Football Championship runner-up: 2012, 2013
- Connacht Senior Football Championship: 2009, 2011, 2012, 2013, 2014, 2015
- All-Ireland Under-21 Football Championship: 2006
- Connacht Under-21 Football Championship: 2006, 2007, 2008
- All-Ireland Minor Football Championship runner-up: 2006

=== Individual ===
- All Star: 2012, nominated 2013
- Man of the match: v Kerry in the 2013 NFL and v Cavan in the 2019 NFL
