= 2013 All-Ireland Senior Football Championship final =

2013 All-Ireland Football Championship final
- Event: 2013 All-Ireland Senior Football Championship
Dublin	Mayo
2–12 (18)	1–14 (17)
- Date: 22 September 2013
- Venue: Croke Park, Dublin
- Man of the Match: Bernard Brogan
- Referee: Joe McQuillan (Cavan)
- Attendance: 82,274
- Weather: Sunny; 22 °C (72 °F)

The 2013 All-Ireland Football Championship final, the 126th event of its kind and the culmination of the 2013 All-Ireland Senior Football Championship, was played between Dublin and Mayo at Croke Park, Dublin on 22 September 2013. Mayo were defeated by Dublin by a single point on a scoreline of 2–12 to 1–14.

Dublin went into the final looking for their second All-Ireland SFC title in three seasons. Mayo entered the 2013 final without a title since 1951, amassing a trail of six finals losses since then, most recently in the previous decider against Donegal. They continued their losing streak for a seventh time, adding Dublin to a list of teams to have defeated them on All-Ireland SFC final days of recent times, among them Donegal, Kerry, Meath and Cork.

The game was televised nationally by RTÉ2 as part of The Sunday Game live programme, presented by Michael Lyster from Croke Park, with studio analysis from Joe Brolly, Pat Spillane, and Colm O'Rourke. Match commentary was by Ger Canning, with colour commentary by Martin Carney. It received a 74% audience share on television.

== Paths to the final ==
Dublin defeated Westmeath, Kildare and Meath to win the Leinster Senior Football Championship. Their defeat of Kildare was their biggest championship win over that team since 1897. Dublin defeated Cork in the All-Ireland SFC quarter-final and Kerry in the semi-final. Many people hailed the Dublin versus Kerry semi-final as the greatest game of the modern era.

Mayo defeated Galway, Roscommon and London to win the Connacht Senior Football Championship. They overcame Donegal in the All-Ireland SFC quarter-final and Tyrone in the semi-final.

== Pre-match ==
=== Tickets and betting odds ===
Tickets for the match sold for more than €500 each. On Facebook, a social media and social networking service, people were selling tickets for €1000 each. There were reports of people buying tickets for 10 times the face value and arriving at the gates to be told the ticket was counterfeit. Dublin were priced at evens to win the match with Mayo at 11/10 and the draw at 9/1.

=== Football Stars of the 1980s Team ===
The GAA announced on 10 September that a special Football Stars of the 1980s team, a specially-chosen line-up of players who were unsuccessful in winning an All-Ireland medal would be acknowledged before the senior final.

=== Team selection ===
Dublin made one change to the starting team from the semi-final, with Philly McMahon replacing Kevin O'Brien at right corner back. The Mayo team was unchanged from the semi-final win against Tyrone, with Cillian O'Connor named at corner-forward after recovering from a dislocated shoulder.

=== Minors ===
Earlier on the day of the senior final, Mayo won the All-Ireland Minor Football Championship final, defeating Tyrone by 2–13 to 1–13.

== Match ==
=== Summary ===
==== First half ====
Joe McQuillan of Cavan refereed the game. Mayo won the toss and elected to play into the canal end goals for the first half. Andy Moran, Lee Keegan, Keith Higgins and Cillian O'Connor all scored points to give Mayo a lead of 0–4 to Dublin's 0–1. Bernard Brogan equalised for Dublin by scoring his and the game's first goal, a deft flick of the ball over Mayo's Ger Cafferkey and goalkeeper Rob Hennelly at the Hill 16 end. At the half-time interval, Mayo were ahead by 0–8 to 1–4.

==== Second half ====
Andy Moran scored a goal in the 50th minute to draw Mayo level, beating Stephen Cluxton with a low shot under his body. Bernard Brogan then scored his second goal, and the game's third in the 54th minute, to give Dublin a lead of 2–9 to 1–9. Denis Bastick sprinted forward and hand-passed to the unmarked Brogan who flicked the ball two handed to the back of the net for his second goal. Dublin player Eoghan O'Gara had a hamstring injury and his teammate Rory O'Carroll had concussion after a collision, and so both were effectively out of the game but still on the pitch due to Dublin having used all their substitutes by the 53rd minute. Mayo were two points behind heading into stoppage time. Cillian O'Connor had a free and, instead of going for the goal that would have won Mayo the game, he kicked it over the bar. The referee blew his whistle to end the game.

=== Details ===
22 September 2013
3:30 pm IST

Dublin	2–12 – 1–14	Mayo
S Cluxton (0–2, 1f, 1 45), G Brennan (0–1), C O'Sullivan (0–1), P Flynn (0–1), D Connolly (0–1), P Andrews (0–1), B Brogan (2–3, 0–1f), E O'Gara (0–2)	Report	L Keegan (0–2), S O'Shea (0–1), K Higgins (0–1), C O'Connor (0–8, 0–8f), A Moran (1–2)

Croke Park, Dublin
Attendance: 82,274
Referee: Joe McQuillan (Cavan)

Dublin	Mayo

Dublin:
1	Stephen Cluxton (c)
2	Philly McMahon
3	Rory O'Carroll
4	Jonny Cooper
5	James McCarthy
6	Ger Brennan
7	Jack McCaffrey
8	Michael Darragh MacAuley
9	Cian O'Sullivan
10	Paul Flynn
11	Ciarán Kilkenny
12	Diarmuid Connolly
13	Paul Mannion
14	Paddy Andrews
15	Bernard Brogan
Substitutes Used:
25	Eoghan O'Gara for Mannion (16 mins)
20	Darren Daly for McCaffrey (half-time)
26	Dean Rock for Kilkenny (42 mins)
22	Kevin McManamon for Andrews (49 mins)
17	Denis Bastick for Cooper (53 mins)
Manager:
Jim Gavin

Mayo:
1	Rob Hennelly
2	Tom Cunniffe
3	Ger Cafferkey
4	Chris Barrett
5	Lee Keegan
6	Donal Vaughan
7	Colm Boyle
8	Aidan O'Shea
9	Seamus O'Shea
10	Kevin McLoughlin
11	Keith Higgins
12	Alan Dillon
13	Cillian O'Connor
14	Alan Freeman
15	Andy Moran (c)
Substitutes Used:
24	Michael Conroy for A Freeman (28 mins)
22	Cathal Carolan for T Cunniffe (half-time)
25	Enda Varley for A Dillon (55 mins)
20	Barry Moran for S O'Shea (60 mins)
26	Jason Doherty for A Moran (68 mins)
Manager:
James Horan

Man of the Match:
Bernard Brogan

Linesmen:
Cormac Reilly (Meath)
Padraig O'Sullivan (Kerry)

Sideline Official
Michael Duffy (Sligo)

Umpires
Tommy O'Reilly
Ciarán Brady
TP Gray
Jimmy Galligan

Dublin subs not used =
16 Shane Supple
18 Shane Carthy
19 Bryan Cullen
21 Michael Fitzsimons
23 Kevin Nolan
24 Kevin O'Brien

== Post-match ==
=== Trophy presentation ===
Dublin captain Stephen Cluxton accepted the Sam Maguire cup from GAA president Liam O'Neill in the Hogan Stand and gave a speech in which he thanked the Dublin panel, selectors, and back room team for their work throughout the year. He also thanked Mayo for a competitive game and said that their time will come.

=== Reaction ===
Mayo player Andy Moran afterwards claimed that the referee had told his teammate Cillian O'Connor there was another 30 seconds left when he scored the late free that left a point between the sides. Referee Joe McQuillan said after the match that he told O'Connor "there's 30 seconds left, There was absolutely no suggestion that it would be after the kick-out or anything like that, Immediately after the game some Mayo players said to me that 'you said there was going to be another play', but I never said that because there is no such thing as that." Speaking in November 2013, Cillian O'Connor said that he assumed that the 30 seconds would be incorporated after Stephen Cluxton's kick-out and acknowledged that it was a mix-up for which Joe McQuillan wasn't culpable for."If I could go back now knowing that the game would be blown from the restart, obviously I would have thrown caution to the wind and tried to go for the goal," “The way it went, I thought there might be one more passage of play. My understanding was that there would be another little bit of time, and if we had maybe won the kickout, and scored an equaliser . . . I’m just saying it would have looked like a good decision. But if I knew there was as little time as there was I would have gone for the goal.” he said.

Mayo manager James Horan felt that basic errors cost his team saying "We had enough ball to win the game but we made too many basic mistakes, Our handpassing let us down, Quite simply the ball has to stick, Coughing up needless possession is killing in an All-Ireland final, We created the chances, but we didn't get the return that was required." Dublin manager Jim Gavin felt that the players deserve great credit saying "It's not about the manager or the management team - it's about the players. It's about, commitment, resolve and self-sacrifice that they have shown to help their county this year, There is great spirit and a collective will within the group. Five or six players were up in the stand today that didn't feature - but they are just as important as those down on the pitch and on the bench." Gavin was also critical of the high number of frees given against Dublin, 32 against Dublin (12 against Mayo) saying "Not only were we playing Mayo but we were playing the referee as well,". James Horan expressed amazement at Gavin's comments about frees saying "I find that amazing. I find that absolutely amazing if that was the comment. I know Jim made another interesting comment – that he'd walk away if his team were cynical, so maybe that's another comment Jim should look at."

Man of the Match, Bernard Brogan speaking about scoring two goals in the final said “Obviously it’s nice to get a goal in the All-Ireland final but it’s about winning medals and that’s the second one there, I’ve one more to go to catch my dad, that’s the next one, any day you win an All-Ireland is a special day. But there’s a whole new group of lads in there and you just saw how much it meant to them after the final whistle, it’s a special day and hopefully we’ve another couple left in us, please God."

RTÉ analyst Joe Brolly was disappointed with what he called "appalling cynicism" in the game's last quarter where Dublin picked up four yellow cards in the final 10 minutes, saying via Twitter "So much for Dublin's 'playing the game the right way' philosophy. Their last quarter display was a master class in cynicism".

In December 2013, Dublin manager Jim Gavin, speaking after receiving the 2013 Philips Sports Manager of the Year award, revealed that the most enjoyable moment after the final was that brief interlude, when the dressing room doors were closed, and the room contained only the people who were most involved in the 2013 campaign.

=== Awards ===
On The Sunday Game programme later that night, Bernard Brogan was named as the man of the match for his overall contribution of 2–3. Kevin McStay, Eamonn O'Hara and Ciarán Whelan picked the winner from three candidates which also included Lee Keegan from Mayo and Michael Darragh MacAuley. The award was presented by GAA President Liam O'Neill and Michael Lyster at the Dublin team's celebration banquet at the Gibson Hotel. The Sunday Game panel also picked their 2013 Team of the Year on the Sunday night programme, with five members of the Dublin team and four members of the Mayo team included.

=== Celebrations ===
The Dublin team celebrated on the Monday night after the final at a victory party at Merrion Square in Dublin with a crowd of up to 35,000 present. The homecoming celebration was hosted by Lord Mayor of Dublin Oisín Quinn and Dublin City Council. The Sunday Game presenter Des Cahill was the MC for the proceedings which started at 7pm and finished shortly after 8.30pm, with Ryan Sheridan entertaining the crowd before the Dublin team were presented on stage. Following the conclusion of the event, the players and management boarded an open top bus to Parnells GAA Club, the home club of Dublin captain Stephen Cluxton. The Parnells club would be liquidated and wound up less than 12 years later.
