= 2019 All-Ireland Senior Football Championship =

Championship details
- Dates: 5 May – 14 September 2019
- Teams: 33

All-Ireland Champions
- Winning team: Dublin (29th win)
- Captain: Stephen Cluxton
- Manager: Jim Gavin

All-Ireland Finalists
- Losing team: Kerry
- Captain: Gavin White
- Manager: Peter Keane

Provincial Champions
- Munster: Kerry
- Leinster: Dublin
- Ulster: Donegal
- Connacht: Roscommon

Championship statistics
- No. matches played: 71
- Top Scorer: Cathal McShane (3–49)
- Player of the Year: Stephen Cluxton

The 2019 All-Ireland Senior Football Championship was the 133rd edition of the GAA's premier inter-county Gaelic football tournament since its establishment in 1887.

Thirty-three teams took part – thirty-one of the thirty-two Counties of Ireland, London and New York. Kilkenny, as in previous years, did not enter.

The defending champion was Dublin. In 2018 this team won a record-equalling fourth consecutive title, becoming only the fourth team to achieve this feat (the other four-in-a-row champions were Wexford in 1915–18 and Kerry in 1929–32 and 1978–81). They won the 2019 final, defeating Kerry in a replay, and became the GAA's first ever five-in-a-row All-Ireland senior champions.

== Format ==
Qualified teams for All Ireland
Entry round	Teams			
Quarter-finals	Kerry (1st)	Dublin (1st)	Roscommon (1st)	Donegal (1st)
Round 4	Cork (2nd)	Meath (2nd)	Galway (2nd)	Cavan (2nd)
Round 3				
Round 2	Clare (SF)	Kildare (SF)	Mayo (SF)	Armagh (SF)
Round 2	Limerick (SF)	Laois (SF)	Sligo (SF)	Tyrone (SF)
Round 1	Tipperary (QF)	Louth (QF)	Wicklow (PR)	Down (QF)
Round 1	Waterford (QF)	Westmeath (QF)	Leitrim (QF)	Fermanagh (QF)
Round 1	Carlow (QF)	Offaly (PR)	London (QF)	Monaghan (QF)
Round 1	Longford (QF)	Wexford (PR)	Antrim (QF)	Derry (PR)

=== Provincial Championships format ===
Connacht, Leinster, Munster and Ulster each organise a provincial championship. Most teams who lose a match in their provincial championship enter the All-Ireland qualifiers – New York does not enter the qualifiers.

All provincial matches are knock-out. If the score is level at the end of the normal seventy minutes, two periods of ten minutes each way are played. If the score is still level the tie goes to a replay.

COVID-19 caused it to be London and New York final year part of the Connacht championship until 2022. Sligo were excluded too from 2020 championships but were back in 2021.

=== Qualifiers format ===
Twenty eight of the twenty nine teams beaten in the provincial championships enter the All-Ireland qualifiers, which are knock-out. Sixteen of the seventeen teams (New York do not enter the qualifiers) eliminated before their provincial semi-finals play eight matches in round 1 of the qualifiers, with the winners of these games playing the eight beaten provincial semi-finalists in round 2. The eight winning teams from round 2 play-off against each other in round 3, with the four winning teams playing the four beaten provincial finalists in round 4. This completes the double-elimination format as the four round 4 winners re-enter the main competition at the Super 8 stage (officially named The All-Ireland Quarter-Final Group Stage). Further details of the format are included with each qualifier round listed below.

In rounds one to three, teams from divisions three and four of the National Football League have home advantage if drawn against teams from divisions one and two.

All qualifier matches are knockout with "Winner On The Day" rules being applied if a match is level at the end of the normal seventy minutes. Initially two extra time periods of ten minutes each way are played. If the score is still level two further periods of five minutes each way are played. If the score is still level, the winner is determined by a penalty shoot-out.

=== All-Ireland format ===
Significant changes to the format of the All-Ireland championship were made at the GAA's Annual Congress in February 2017 and introduced in 2018. The major change was the creation of the All-Ireland Quarter-Final Group Stage commonly known as "The Super 8s", which replaced the four knockout quarter-finals. Two groups of four teams compete in three rounds (officially referred to as phases) in the Super 8s.

The top two teams in each group contest the semi-finals on a weekend in early August. The All-Ireland final is played "by the 35th Sunday of the year".

The semi-finals and final are knock-out. If the score is level at the end of the normal seventy minutes in a semi-final, two periods of ten minutes each way are played. If the score is still level the semi-final is replayed. If the score is level at the end of the normal seventy minutes in the final, the match is replayed.

The changes will be trialed for three years before being reviewed by the GAA in late 2020.

== Provincial championships ==
=== Connacht Senior Football Championship ===
For official fixtures and results see Connacht Senior Football Championship at gaa.ie

Quarter-finals, May 5 and 12
New York	0-04
Mayo	1-22
Leitrim	0-12
Roscommon	3-17
London	1-9
Galway	0-16

Semi-finals, May 19 and 25
Mayo	0-17
Roscommon	2-12
Sligo	0-7
Galway	3-11

Final, June 16
Roscommon	1-13
Galway	0-12

=== Leinster Senior Football Championship ===
The four teams who won their quarter-finals in the previous year are given byes to this year's quarter-finals. Six of the seven remaining teams play-off in the preliminary round with the seventh team also receiving a bye to the quarter-finals.

For official fixtures and results see Leinster Senior Football Championship at gaa.ie

Preliminary round 11/12 May
Louth	0-22
Wexford	1-14
Wicklow	1-10
Kildare	0-15
Meath	1-13
Offaly	0-14

Quarter-finals; 25/26 May; 2 June
Dublin	5-21
Louth	0-10
Longford (R)	3-15; 0-10
Kildare (R)	1-21; 1-18
Carlow	0-9
Meath	2-18
Laois	0-12
Westmeath	0-10

Semi-finals; 9 June
Dublin	0-26
Kildare	0-11
Meath	3-13
Laois	0-11

Final; 23 June
Dublin	1-17
Meath	0-4

=== Munster Senior Football Championship ===
The two teams who won the semi-finals in the previous year are given byes to this year's semi-finals.

For official fixtures and results see Munster Senior Football Championship at gaa.ie

Quarter-finals, May 11
Tipperary	1-10
Limerick	3-11
Clare	0-9
Waterford	0-8

Semi-finals, June 1
Cork	3-18
Limerick	0-06
Kerry	1-15
Clare	0-12

Final, June 22
Cork	3-10
Kerry	1-19

=== Ulster Senior Football Championship ===
An un-seeded draw determined the fixtures for all nine teams. In April 2018, the Ulster GAA Competitions Control Committee introduced a rule that the two teams playing in the preliminary round would be exempt from playing in the preliminary round in the following two years. Derry and Tyrone were therefore awarded byes to the quarter-finals in 2020 and 2021.

For official fixtures and results see Ulster Senior Football Championship at gaa.ie

Preliminary round 12 May 2019
Tyrone	1-19
Derry	1-13

Quarter-finals; 18, 19, 25, 26 May 2019
Cavan	1-13
Monaghan	0-12
Down	3-13
Armagh	2-17
Fermanagh	0-09
Donegal	0-15
Antrim	2-09
Tyrone	2-23

Semi-finals; 2 & 8 June 2019
Cavan (R)	0-17; 0-23
Armagh (R)	1-14; 0-17
Donegal	1-16
Tyrone	0-15

Final; 23 June 2019
Cavan	2-16
Donegal	1-24

== All-Ireland Series ==
=== Qualifiers ===
For official fixtures and results see All-Ireland Senior Football Championship at gaa.ie

==== Round 1 ====
In the first round of the qualifiers sixteen of the seventeen teams beaten in the preliminary rounds or quarter-finals of the provincial championships competed. New York did not enter the qualifiers. The round 1 draw was unrestricted − if two teams played each other in a provincial match they could be drawn to meet again. The eight winners of these matches played the eight beaten provincial semi-finalists in round 2 of the qualifiers.

The following teams took part in round 1 –

Connacht (2)

- London
- Leitrim

Leinster (7)

- Offaly
- Wicklow
- Wexford
- Louth
- Carlow
- Westmeath
- Longford

Munster (2)

- Tipperary
- Waterford

Ulster (5)

- Derry
- Monaghan
- Down
- Antrim
- Fermanagh

8 June 2019 Round 1	Offaly	1–21 (24) – (14) 1–11	London	Tullamore
13:30 IST (UTC+1)				Venue: O'Connor Park

8 June 2019 Round 1	Leitrim	0–15 (15) – (13) 0–13	Wicklow	Carrick on Shannon
15:00 IST (UTC+1)				Venue: Páirc Seán Mac Diarmada

8 June 2019 Round 1	Wexford	0–10 (10) – (28) 4–16	Derry	Wexford
16:45 IST (UTC+1)				Venue: Wexford Park
	Pts: Donal Shanley 0–2, Tom Byrne 0–2, Brian Malone 0–1, Conor Devitt 0–1, Michael Furlong 0–1, Jonathan Bealin 0–1, Niall Hughes 0–1, James Cash 0–1	Report	Pts: Shane McGuigan 1–4, Ryan Bell 1–3, Benny Heron 1–2, Enda Lynn 1–1, Conor McAtamney 0–2, Ciarán McFaul 0–1, Pádraig Cassidy 0–1, Christopher Bradley 0–1, Jack Doherty 0–1	Referee: Anthony Nolan (Wicklow)

8 June 2019 Round 1	Louth	1–11 (14) – (22) 2–16	Antrim	Drogheda
19:00 IST (UTC+1)				Venue: Gaelic Grounds
	Gls: Matthew Fitzpatrick 2 Pts: Matthew Fitzpatrick 1, Ryan Murray 0–6, Patrick McBride 0–3, Ruairí Scott 0–2, Colum Duffin 0–2, Patrick McCormick 0–1 and Niall Delargy 0–1	Report	Gls: Andy McDonnell 1 Pts: Andy McDonnell 0–1, Ryan Burns 0–2, Declan Byrne 0–2, Conall McKeever 0–1, Emmet Carolan 0–1, Ciaran Downey 0–1, Tommy Durnin 0–1, John Clutterbuck0-1 and Bevan Duffy 0–1	Referee: Martin McNally (Monaghan)

9 June 2019 Round 1	Monaghan	1–10 (13) – (9) 1–06	Fermanagh	Clones
13:45 IST (UTC+1)				Venue: St Tiernach's Park

9 June 2019 Round 1	Down	1–13 (16) – (13) 1–10	Tipperary	Newry
14:00 IST (UTC+1)				Venue: Páirc Esler
	Gls: D O’Hare 1 Pts: P Havern 0–4; C Quinn 0–3; C Harrison 0–2; R Burns (45), D O’Hagan, J Johnston, P Devlin, B O’Hagan 0–1 each	Report	Gls: P Austin 1 Pts: C Sweeney 0-4f, P Austin 0–1; L McGrath 0-2f; J Kennedy (45), M Quinlivan, L Casey 0–1 each.	Referee: Fergal Kelly (Longford)

9 June 2019 Round 1	Carlow	0–07 (7) – (17) 2–11	Longford	Carlow
15:00 IST (UTC+1)				Venue: Dr Cullen Park

9 June 2019 Round 1	Westmeath	1–22 (25) – (7) 0–07	Waterford	Mullingar
15:00 IST (UTC+1)				Venue: Cusack Park

==== Round 2 ====
In the second round of the qualifiers the eight winning teams from round 1 played the eight beaten provincial semi-finalists. The round 2 draw was unrestricted − if two teams played each other in a provincial match they could be drawn to meet again. The eight winners of these matches played each other in four matches in round 3.

The following teams took part in round 2 –

Round 1
Winners (8)

- Offaly
- Leitrim
- Antrim
- Derry
- Monaghan
- Down
- Longford
- Westmeath

Beaten Provincial
Semi-Finalists (8)

Connacht (2)

- Sligo
- Mayo

Leinster (2)

- Kildare
- Laois

Munster (2)

- Limerick
- Clare

Ulster (2)

- Tyrone
- Armagh

22 June 2019 Round 2	Antrim	0–14 (14) – (28) 1–25	Kildare	Belfast
15:00 IST (UTC+1)				Venue: Corrigan Park
				Referee: Noel Mooney (Cavan)

22 June 2019 Round 2	Longford	1–14 (17) – (21) 2–15	Tyrone	Longford
17:00 IST (UTC+1)				Venue: Pearse Park
				Attendance: 4,162

22 June 2019 Round 2	Derry	0–12 (12) – (16) 1–13	Laois	Dungiven
17:00 IST (UTC+1)				Venue: Owenbeg Centre of Excellence

22 June 2019 Round 2	Westmeath	2–13 (19) – (13) 1–10	Limerick	Mullingar
18:00 IST (UTC+1)				Venue: Cusack Park

22 June 2019 Round 2	Leitrim	0–17 (17) – (26) 3–17	Clare	Carrick-on-Shannon
18:00 IST (UTC+1)				Venue: Páirc Seán Mac Diarmada
				Attendance: 7,563

22 June 2019 Round 2	Down	1–11 (14) – (19) 1–16	Mayo	Newry
19:00 IST (UTC+1)				Venue: Páirc Esler

22 June 2019 Round 2	Monaghan	1–12 (15) – (23) 2–17	Armagh	Clones
19:00 IST (UTC+1)				Venue: St Tiernach's Park
				Referee: Ciaran Branagan (Down)

23 June 2019 Round 2	Offaly	3–17 (26) – (15) 0–15	Sligo	Tullamore
15:00 IST (UTC+1)				Venue: O'Connor Park

==== Round 3 ====
In the third round of the qualifiers the eight winning teams from round 2 played off in four matches. Round 3 draw rules did not allow two teams that have played each other in a provincial match to meet again if such a pairing could be avoided. In 2019 only Laois and Westmeath had played each other and this pairing was prevented in the draw. The four winners of these matches played the four beaten provincial finalists in round 4.

The following teams took part in round 3:

Round 2 Winners (8)

- Kildare
- Tyrone
- Laois
- Westmeath
- Clare
- Mayo
- Armagh
- Offaly

29 June 2019 Round 3	Kildare	1–15 (18) – (28) 2–22	Tyrone	Newbridge
17:00 IST (UTC+1)				Venue: St Conleth's Park
	Gls: Kevin Feely 1 Pts: Adam Tyrrell 6 (5f) Kevin Feely 2, Fergal Conway 3, Neil Flynn 2 (1f), Tommy Moolick 1, Peter Kelly 1	Report	Gls: Darren McCurry 1, Michael Cassidy 1, Paul Kerrigan 1 Pts: Peter Harte 7 (3f), Darren McCurry 2, Cathal McShane 5 (2f), Matthew Donnelly 3, Frank Burns 2, Rory Brennan 1, Colm Cavanagh 1, Connor McAliskey 1	Referee: Paddy Neilan (Roscommon); Attendance: ~6,000; TV: Sky Sports

29 June 2019 Round 3	Westmeath	0–15 (15) – (16) 1–13	Clare	Mullingar
18:00 IST (UTC+1)				Venue: TEG Cusack Park
	Pts: Kieran Martin 6 (3f), Tommy McDaniel 3 (2f), Callum McCormack 2, Ronan O'Toole 1, Ger Egan 1, Tom Molloy 1, N Mulligan 1 (1 45)	Report	Gls: David Tubridy 1 Pts: David Tubridy 2 (2f), Jamie Malone 3, Eoin Cleary 3 (3f), Cathal O'Connor 2, Gary Brennan 2, Gavin Cooney 1	Referee: Martin McNally (Monaghan); Attendance: ~5,000

29 June 2019 Round 3	Mayo	2–13 (19) – (18) 1–15	Armagh	Castlebar
19:00 IST (UTC+1)				Venue: MacHale Park
	Gls: Fionn McDonagh 1, Kevin McLoughlin 1 Pts: Fionn McDonagh 1, Kevin McLoughlin 1, Darren Coen 4, Conor Loftus 2 (2f), Cillian O’Connor 2 (2f), Patrick Durcan 1, Jason Doherty 1, Donal Vaughan 1	Report	Gls: Rian O’Neill 1 Pts: Jamie Clarke 5 (2f), Rian O’Neill 2 (2f), Stefan Campbell 4, Rory Grugan 3, Niall Grimley 1	Referee: Maurice Deegan (Laois); Attendance: 18,711; TV: Sky Sports

29 June 2019 Round 3	Laois	0–20 (20) – (15) 0–15	Offaly	Portlaoise
19:00 IST (UTC+1)				Venue: O'Moore Park
	Pts: Donie Kingston 6 (3f), Paul Kingston 4, Ross Munnelly 1(1f), Colm Murphy 2, Kieran Lillis 2, Evan O’Carroll 2, Eoin Lowry 1, Robert Pigott 1	Report	Pts: Ruairí McNamee 4, Bernard Allen 3, Niall McNamee 3 (1f), Paddy Dunican 3 (3f), Anton Sullivan 1, Johnny Moloney 1	Referee: David Coldrick (Meath); Attendance: 6,735

==== Round 4 ====
In the fourth round of the qualifiers, the four winning teams from round 3 played the four beaten provincial finalists. Round 4 draw rules did not allow two teams that had played each other in a provincial match to meet again if such a pairing could be avoided. The matches were normally held in neutral venues (unless the two teams involved had an arrangement or agreed to a coin toss to decide who had home advantage). The four winners of these matches played in the round robin All-Ireland Super 8s.

The following teams took part in round 4 –

Draw

Beaten Provincial Finalists	Round 3 Winners
Galway Cork Cavan Meath	Clare Tyrone Mayo Laois

6 July 2019 Round 4	Cavan	0–07 (07) – (23) 1–20	Tyrone	Clones
17:00 IST (UTC+1)				Venue: St Tiernach's Park
	Pts: Niall Murray 2 (2f), Gearoid McKiernan 2 (2f), Dara McVeety 1, Gerard Smith 1, Conor Madden 1	Report	Gls: Ben McDonnell 1 Pts: Cathal McShane 5 (3f), Peter Harte 5 (4f), Darren McCurry 3, Niall Sludden 2, Niall Morgan 2 (1f, 1 '45'), Brian Kennedy 1, Colm Cavanagh 1, Conal McCann 1	Referee: Barry Cassidy (Derry); Attendance: 11,258; TV: Sky Sports

6 July 2019 Round 4	Cork	4–20 (32) – (18) 1–15	Laois	Thurles
17:00 IST (UTC+1)				Venue: Semple Stadium
	Gls: Brian Hurley 2, Mark Collins 1, Paul Kerrigan 1 Pts: Mark Collins 8 (4f), Brian Hurley 4, Ruairi Deane 2, Stephen Sherlock 2 (1 '45'), Paul Kerrigan 1, Ronan O’Toole 1, Kevin O’Driscoll 1, Liam O’Donovan 1	Report	Gls: Martin Scully 1 Pts: Donie Kingston 9 (6f), Trevor Collins 1, Colm Murphy 1, Eoin Lowry 1, Paul Kingston 1, Mark Barry 1, Evan O’Carroll 1	Referee: Fergal Kelly (Longford)

6 July 2019 Round 4	Galway	1–13 (16) – (19) 2–13	Mayo	Limerick
19:00 IST (UTC+1)				Venue: Gaelic Grounds
	Gls: Shane Walsh 1 (1f); Pts: Peter Cooke 4, Shane Walsh 3 (2f, 1 '45'), Eamonn Brannigan 2, Cillian McDaid 1, Gary O’Donnell 1, Michael Daly 1, Kieran Molloy 1	Report	Gls: James Carr 2 Pts: Cillian O’Connor 6 (5f), Darren Coen 3, Kevin McLoughlin 1, Stephen Coen 1, Jason Doherty 1, Donal Vaughan 1	Referee: Joe McQuillan (Cavan); Attendance: 19,183; TV: Sky Sports

7 July 2019 Round 4	Meath	2–16 (22) – (21) 1–18	Clare	Portlaoise
14:00 IST (UTC+1)				Venue: O'Moore Park
	Gls: Mickey Newman 1, Bryan Menton 1 Pts: Mickey Newman 6 (5f), James Conlon 3, Donal Keogan 1, Ethan Devine 1, Bryan McMahon 1, Thomas McGovern 1, Cillian O’Sullivan 1, Ben Brennan 1, Shane Walsh 1 (1f)	Report	Gls: Gavin Cooney 1 Pts: David Tubridy 6 (3f), Jamie Malone 4, Cathal O’Connor 2, Eoin Cleary 2 (2f), Cian O’Dea 1, Gary Brennan 1, Dermot Coughlan 1, and Gordon Kelly 1	Referee: Derek O'Mahoney (Tipperary); TV: RTÉ

=== Group stage ===
For official fixtures and results see All-Ireland Senior Football Championship at gaa.ie

==== Structure ====
Format

The four provincial champions and the four winning teams from round four of the All-Ireland qualifiers are divided into two groups of four teams. Each group consists of two provincial champions and the two losing provincial finalists of the other two provinces or the team that beats them in round four of the qualifiers.

There are three rounds of two games in each group. Teams have one home game, one away game and one game in Croke Park:

Phase 1 – Weekend of 13/14 July – Each of the two provincial champions play one of the two qualifiers with both provincial champions having home advantage.

Phase 2 – Weekend of 20/21 July – The provincial champions play each other and the two qualifiers play each other. All round 2 matches are in Croke Park.

Phase 3 – Weekend of 3/4 August – Both qualifiers have home advantage when they play the provincial champions.

Dublin, if they qualify, will play their home game at Croke Park meaning that they will have two "Super 8" games in Croke Park. Some counties criticised the use of Croke Park as a home venue for Dublin. At the GAA Congress on 23 February 2019 Donegal proposed that Dublin be limited to playing one "Super 8" game at Croke Park. The motion failed as it only received 36% of the available votes.

Super 8 games are played in the four weeks beginning in early July and ending in the first weekend in August (which is also the bank holiday weekend in the Republic of Ireland). Two points are awarded for a win and one point for a draw. The top two teams in each group advance to the All-Ireland semi-finals.

Tie-breaker

If only two teams are level on group points –

- The team that won the head-to-head match is ranked first
- If this game was a draw, score difference (total scored minus total conceded in all group games) is used to rank the teams
- If score difference is identical, total scored is used to rank the teams
- If still identical, a play-off is required

If three or more teams are level on group points, score difference is used to rank the teams.

==== Group 1 ====
Pos	Team	Pld	W	D	L	PF	PA	PD	Pts	Qualification
1	Kerry	3	2	1	0	72	54	+18	5	Advance to semi-finals
2	Mayo	3	2	0	1	55	52	+3	4	Advance to semi-finals
3	Donegal	3	1	1	1	61	56	+5	3	
4	Meath	3	0	0	3	46	72	−26	0	

Updated to match(es) played on 3 August 2019. Source:

14 July 2019 Phase 1	Donegal	2–19 (25) – (16) 1–13	Meath	Ballybofey
14:00 IST (UTC+1)		(HT: 1–9 – 0–8)		Venue: MacCumhaill Park
	Gls: Patrick McBrearty 1, Oisín Gallen 1 Pts: Patrick McBrearty 6 (2f), Michael Murphy 3 (1 '45'), Jamie Brennan 3, Ryan McHugh 2, Oisín Gallen 1, Niall O'Donnell 1, Michael Langan 1, Jason McGee 1, Eoin McHugh 1	Report	Gls: Mickey Newman 1 (1p); Pts: Bryan McMahon 0–3, Mickey Newman 2 (1f), Cillian O'Sullivan 2, Bryan Menton 2, James Conlon 1, James McEntee 1, Shane McEntee 1, Darragh Campion 1	Referee: Conor Lane (Cork); TV: Sky Sports

14 July 2019 Phase 1	Kerry	1–22 (25) – (15) 0–15	Mayo	Killarney
16:00 IST (UTC+1)		(HT: 0–15 – 0–6)		Venue: Fitzgerald Stadium
	Gls: Paul Geaney 1 Pts: David Clifford 7 (1f), Seán O'Shea 7 (6f), Stephen O'Brien 3, Paul Geaney 2, David Moran 1, James O’Donoghue 1, Graham O'Sullivan 1, Shane Enright 1	Report	Pts: Cillian O'Connor 6 (3f, 1p), Darren Coen 3, Andy Moran 2, Lee Keegan 1, Fionn McDonagh 1, Fergal Boland 1, Ciaran Tracey 1	Referee: Sean Hurson (Tyrone); Attendance: 31,312; TV: RTÉ

21 July 2019 Phase 2	Mayo	2–17 (23) – (14) 0–14	Meath	Dublin
14:00 IST (UTC+1)		(HT: 0–7 – 0–7)		Venue: Croke Park
	Gls: Cillian O'Connor 1, Kevin McLoughlin 1, Pts: Cillian O'Connor 5 (4f), Fionn McDonagh 2, Jason Doherty 2, Fergal Boland 2, Kevin McLoughlin 1, Darren Coen 1, Andy Moran 1, Colm Boyle 1, Lee Keegan 1, James Carr 1	Report	Pts: Shane Walsh 5 (5f), Michael Newman 2 (1f), Seamus Lavin 2, Brian Menton 1, James McEntee 1, Ethan Devane 1, Cillian O’Sullivan 1, Seamus Lavin 1, James Conlon 1	Referee: Ciaran Branagan (Down); TV: RTÉ

21 July 2019 Phase 2	Kerry	1–20 (23) – (23) 1–20	Donegal	Dublin
16:00 IST (UTC+1)		(HT: 0–10 – 0–9)		Venue: Croke Park
	Gls: Paul Geaney 1 Pts: Paul Geaney 4, Seán O'Shea 4 (3f), David Clifford 3 (1f), Stephen O'Brien 3, Killian Spillane 3, Tom O'Sullivan 1, Jason Foley 1, Paul Murphy 1	Report	Gls: Michael Murphy 1 (1p); Pts: Michael Murphy 7 (4f), Patrick McBrearty 5 (3f), Ryan McHugh 2, Oisín Gallen 2, Michael Langan 2, Jason McGee 1, Niall O'Donnell 1	Referee: Paddy Neilan (Roscommon); TV: RTÉ

3 August 2019 Phase 3	Mayo	1–14 (17) – (13) 1–10	Donegal	Castlebar
18:00 IST (UTC+1)		(HT: 1–7 – 0–4)		Venue: MacHale Park
	Gls: Cillian O'Connor 1 Pts: Cillian O'Connor 4 (4f), Paddy Durcan 3, James Carr 2, Andy Moran 2, Jason Doherty 1, Chris Barrett 1, Kevin McLoughlin 1	Report	Gls: Michael Murphy 1 (1p); Pts: Michael Murphy 4 (2f) Paddy McBrearty 2, Niall O'Donnell 2, Daire Ó Baoill 2	Referee: David Gough (Meath); Attendance: 27,369; TV: Sky Sports

3 August 2019 Phase 3	Meath	1–13 (16) – (24) 2–18	Kerry	Navan
18:00 IST (UTC+1)		(HT: 1–9 – 1–10)		Venue: Páirc Tailteann
	Gls: Darragh Campion 1 Pts: Shane Walsh 6 (3f), Bryan McMahon 3, Darragh Campion 1, Thomas O'Reilly 1, Ethan Devine 1, Bryan Menton 1	Report	Gls: Seán O'Shea 1, Brian Ó Beaglaoích 1 Pts: Seán O'Shea 8 (4f, 1 ’45′), Killian Spillane 3, Paul Geaney 2, David Moran 2, Brian Ó Beaglaoích 1, Stephen O’Brien 1, Tom O’Sullivan 1	Referee: Fergal Kelly (Longford); TV: Sky Sports

==== Group 2 ====
Pos	Team	Pld	W	D	L	PF	PA	PD	Pts	Qualification
1	Dublin	3	3	0	0	84	47	+37	6	Advance to semi-finals
2	Tyrone	3	2	0	1	51	50	+1	4	Advance to semi-finals
3	Roscommon	3	1	0	2	48	67	−19	2	
4	Cork	3	0	0	3	56	75	−19	0	

Updated to match(es) played on 4 August 2019. Source:

13 July 2019 Phase 1	Roscommon	0–13 (13) – (17) 0–17	Tyrone	Roscommon
17:00 IST (UTC+1)		(HT: 0–6 – 0–8)		Venue: Dr Hyde Park
	Pts: Diarmuid Murtagh 4, (2f), Conor Cox 2, (1f), Darren O'Malley 1, (1f), Niall Daly 1, Shane Killoran 1, Cathal Cregg 1, Enda Smith 1, Brian Stack 1, Andrew Glennon 1	Report	Pts: Cathal McShane 8 (5f), Niall Sludden (3, Mattie Donnelly 2, Frank Burns 1, Brian Kennedy 1, Peter Harte 1, Darren McCurry 1	Referee: David Coldrick (Meath); TV: Sky Sports

13 July 2019 Phase 1	Dublin	5–18 (33) – (20) 1–17	Cork	Dublin
19:00 IST (UTC+1)		(HT: 2–9 – 0–9)		Venue: Croke Park
	Gls: Jack McCaffrey 1, Michael Darragh MacAuley 1, Niall Scully 1, Ciarán Kilkenny 1, Brian Fenton 1 Pts: Dean Rock 5 (3f, 1 '45'), Con O'Callaghan 4, Ciarán Kilkenny 2, Philly McMahon 2, Paul Mannion 2, Brian Fenton 1, John Small 1, Cormac Costello 1 (1f)	Report	Gls: Luke Connolly 1 (1p); Pts: Luke Connolly 3 (1 '45'), Paul Kerrigan 3, Brian Hurley 3 (1f), Michael Hurley 2, Mark Collins 1 (1f), Sean White 1, Ruairi Deane 1, Kevin O'Driscoll 1, Mattie Taylor 1, Liam O'Donovan 1	Referee: David Gough (Meath); Attendance: 30,214; TV: RTÉ

20 July 2019 Phase 2	Cork	2–12 (18) – (21) 2–15	Tyrone	Dublin
17:00 IST (UTC+1)		(HT: 2–4 – 0–5)		Venue: Croke Park
	Gls: Luke Connolly 1, James Loughrey 1 Pts: Michael Hurley 4, Luke Connolly 3 (2f), Mark Collins 2 (2f), Mattie Taylor 1, Sean White 1, John O'Rourke 1	Report	Gls: Cathal McShane 1, Peter Harte 1 (1p); Pts: Cathal McShane 5 (4f), Peter Harte 5 (3f), Mattie Donnelly 3, Tiarnan McCann 1, Conor Meyler 1	Referee: Maurice Deegan (Laois); TV: Sky Sports

20 July 2019 Phase 2	Dublin	2–26 (32) – (14) 0–14	Roscommon	Dublin
19:00 IST (UTC+1)		(HT: 1–15 – 0–7)		Venue: Croke Park
	Gls: Dean Rock 1, Michael Darragh MacAuley 1 Pts: Dean Rock 11 (10f), Paul Mannion 3, Paddy Small 3, Ciarán Kilkenny 2, Brian Fenton 2, Con O’Callaghan 2, Jack McCaffrey 1, Kevin McManamon 1, Niall Scully 1	Report	Pts: Conor Cox 7 (4f), Conor Hussey 3, Cathal Compton 1, Diarmuid Murtagh 1, Niall Daly 1, Seán Mullooly 1	Referee: Barry Cassidy (Derry); TV: Sky Sports

4 August 2019 Phase 3	Cork	3–9 (18) – (21) 4–9	Roscommon	Cork
16:00 IST (UTC+1)		(HT: 2–5 – 1–7)		Venue: Páirc Uí Rinn
	Gls: Luke Connolly 1, Mark Collins 1, James Loughrey 1 Pts: Luke Connolly 3 (3f), Mark Collins 2 (2f), Ruairi Deane 1, Kevin O'Driscoll 1, Stephen Sherlock 1, John O’Rourke 1	Report	Gls: Brian Stack 2, Enda Smith 1, Shane Killoran 1 Pts: Conor Cox 5 (5f), Enda Smith 1, Shane Killoran 1, Andrew Glennon 1 (1f), Donie Smith 1	Referee: Noel Mooney (Cavan); Attendance: 2,356; TV: RTÉ

4 August 2019 Phase 3	Tyrone	0–13 (13) – (19) 1–16	Dublin	Omagh
16:00 IST (UTC+1)		(HT: 0–5 – 0–8)		Venue: Healy Park
	Pts: Connor McAliskey 5 (2f), Richard Donnelly 2, Kyle Coney 2 (2f), Conan Grugan 1, Conall McCann 1, Darren McCurry 1, Niall Sludden 1	Report	Gls: Eoghan O'Gara 1 Pts: Cormac Costello 6 (4f), Seán Bugler 3, Kevin McManamon 2, Paddy Small 2, Paddy Andrews 1, Bernard Brogan 1, Diarmuid Connolly 1	Referee: Joe McQuillan (Cavan); Attendance: 15,315; TV: RTÉ

=== Knockout stage ===
Semi-finals
Dublin	3–14
Mayo	1–10
Tyrone	0–18
Kerry	1–18

Final
Dublin (R)	1–16 (1–18)
Kerry (R)	1–16 (0–15)

==== Semi-finals ====
The winner of Super 8s Group 1 played the runner-up of Super 8s Group 2, while the winner of Super 8s Group 2 played the runner-up of Super 8s Group 1.

RTÉ
Sky Sports

10 August 2019
17:00 IST (UTC+1)
Semi-final

Report

Mayo	1–10 (13) – (23) 3–14	Dublin
(HT: 0-08 – 0-06)
Gls: Lee Keegan 1 Pts: Cillian O'Connor 3 (2f) Patrick Durcan 2, Colm Boyle 1, Séamus O'Shea 1, Fergal Boland 1, Stephen Coen 1, James Carr 1		Gls: Con O'Callaghan 2, Brian Fenton 1 Pts: Dean Rock 6 (6f), Paul Mannion 5, Brian Fenton 1, Niall Scully 1, Brian Howard 1

Croke Park, Dublin
Referee: Conor Lane (Cork)
Attendance: 82,300

RTÉ
Sky Sports

11 August 2019
15:30 IST (UTC+1)
Semi-final

Report

Tyrone	0–18 (18) – (21) 1–18	Kerry
(HT: 0-09 – 0-05)
Pts: Cathal McShane 7 (3f), Niall Sludden 2, Mattie Donnelly 2, Niall Morgan 2 (2 '45'), Peter Harte 1 (1f), Connor McAliskey 1, Darren McCurry 1, Richie Donnelly 1, Michael McKernan 1		Gls: Stephen O'Brien 1 Pts: Seán O'Shea 6 (5f, 1 '45'), David Clifford 5 (1f), Paul Geaney 3, Stephen O'Brien 2, David Moran 1, Jack Sherwood 1

Croke Park, Dublin
Referee: Maurice Deegan (Laois)
Attendance: 33,848

==== Final ====
The Central Competitions Control Committee of the GAA decided in October 2018 that, in future, the final should be played "by the 35th Sunday of the year". Traditionally the final was held on the third Sunday in September.

RTÉ
Sky Sports

1 September 2019
15:30 IST (UTC+1)
Final

Report

Dublin	1–16 (19) – (19) 1–16	Kerry
(HT: 1-09 – 0-08)
Gls: Jack McCaffrey 1 Pts: Dean Rock 10 (6f, 1 ’45), Jack McCaffrey 3, Paul Mannion 2, Con O'Callaghan 1		Gls: Killian Spillane 1 Pts: Seán O'Shea 10 (4f, 3 ’45), David Clifford 2, Gavin Crowley 1, Killian Spillane 1, Stephen O'Brien 1, Tommy Walsh 1

Croke Park, Dublin
Referee: David Gough (Meath)
Attendance: 82,300
Standby: Conor Lane (Cork)
Linesman: Barry Cassidy (Derry)
Sideline: Sean Hurson (Tyrone)
Umpires: Eugene Gough, Terry Gough, Stephen Gough, Dean Gough (all Slane GFC, Meath)

RTÉ
Sky Sports

14 September 2019
18:00 IST (UTC+1)
Final Replay

Report

Dublin	1–18 (21) – (15) 0–15	Kerry
(HT: 0–10 – 0–10)
Gls: Eoin Murchan 1 Pts: Ciarán Kilkenny 4, Con O’Callaghan 4, Paul Mannion 4, Dean Rock 3 (1 '45), David Byrne 1, James McCarthy 1, Niall Scully 1		Pts: Seán O'Shea 5 (3f), David Clifford 5 (1f), Paul Geaney 4, Adrian Spillane 1

Croke Park, Dublin
Referee: Conor Lane (Cork)
Attendance: 82,300
Standby: Maurice Deegan (Laois)
Linesman: David Coldrick (Meath)
Sideline: Niall Cullen (Fermanagh)
Umpires: Kevin Roache, DJ O'Sullivan (both Banteer/Lyre), Ray Hegarty (Bride Rovers), Pat Kelly (Kilshannig)

== Stadia and locations ==
Team	Location	Stadium	Stadium Capacity
Antrim	Belfast	Corrigan Park	5,000
Armagh	Armagh	Athletic Grounds	19,500
Carlow	Carlow	Dr Cullen Park	21,000
Cavan	Cavan	Breffni Park	32,000
Clare	Ennis	Cusack Park	14,864
Cork	Cork	Páirc Uí Chaoimh	50,288
Derry	Derry	Celtic Park	22,000
Donegal	Ballybofey	MacCumhaill Park	18,000
Down	Newry	Páirc Esler	25,000
Dublin	Donnycarney	Parnell Park	13,500
Fermanagh	Enniskillen	Brewster Park	20,000
GAA	Drumcondra	Croke Park	82,300
Galway	Galway	Pearse Stadium	26,197
Kerry	Killarney	Fitzgerald Stadium	43,180
Kildare	Newbridge	St Conleth's Park	6,200
Laois	Portlaoise	O'Moore Park	27,000
Leitrim	Carrick-on-Shannon	Páirc Seán Mac Diarmada	9,331
Limerick	Limerick	Gaelic Grounds	49,866
London	Ruislip	Emerald GAA Grounds	5,000
Longford	Longford	Pearse Park	10,000
Louth	Drogheda	Drogheda Park	7,000
Mayo	Castlebar	MacHale Park	42,000
Meath	Navan	Páirc Tailteann	10,000
Monaghan	Clones	St Tiernach's Park	36,000
New York	Kingsbridge	Gaelic Park	2,000
Offaly	Tullamore	O'Connor Park	20,000
Roscommon	Roscommon	Dr Hyde Park	25,000
Sligo	Sligo	Markievicz Park	18,558
Tipperary	Thurles	Semple Stadium	45,690
Tyrone	Omagh	Healy Park	26,500
Waterford	Waterford	Walsh Park	17,000
Westmeath	Mullingar	Cusack Park	11,000
Wexford	Wexford	Wexford Park	20,000
Wicklow	Aughrim	Aughrim County Ground	10,000

== Referees Panel ==
As announced in April 2019:

This was the first year in the SFC for two referees: Brendan Cawley (Kildare) and James Molloy (Galway).

Championship Panel
Name	County	Club	Matches refereed
BRANAGAN, Ciarán	Down		
CASSIDY, Barry	Derry	Bellaghy	
CAWLEY, Brendan	Kildare	Sarsfields	
COLDRICK, David	Meath	Blackhall Gaels	
CULLEN, Niall	Fermanagh		
DEEGAN, Maurice	Laois	Stradbally	
GOUGH, David	Meath	Slane	
HENRY, Jerome	Mayo		
HURSON, Sean	Tyrone	Galbally Pearses	
KELLY, Fergal	Longford		
LANE, Conor	Cork	Banteer	
MCNALLY, Martin	Monaghan	Corduff	
MCQUILLAN, Joe	Cavan	Kill Shamrocks	
MOLLOY, James	Galway		
MOONEY, Noel	Cavan		
NEILAN, Paddy	Roscommon	St Faithleach's	
NOLAN, Annthony	Wicklow		
O'MAHONEY, Derek	Tipperary		

== Statistics ==
- All scores correct as of 13 August 2019

=== Top Scorer: overall ===
Rank	Player	County	Tally	Total	Matches	Average
1	Cathal McShane	Tyrone	3–49	58	9	6.3
2	Seán O'Shea	Kerry	1–53	56	8	7.1
3	Dean Rock	Dublin	1–39	42	6	7.0
4	Mark Collins	Cork	2–31	37	6	6.2
5	Mickey Newman	Meath	4–24	36	7	5.1
6	Peter Harte	Tyrone	1–32	35	9	3.9
7	Cormac Costello	Dublin	1–31	34	8	4.3
7	Adam Tyrrell	Kildare	1–31	34	6	5.7
9	Michael Murphy	Donegal	2–25	31	6	5.2
10	Rian O'Neill	Armagh	3–21	30	5	6
11	David Clifford	Kerry	0–29	29	5	4.2
11	Conor Cox	Roscommon	0–29	29	6	4.8
11	Patrick McBrearty	Donegal	1–26	29	6	4.8
11	Cillian O'Connor	Mayo	2–23	29	5	5.8
15	Paul Mannion	Dublin	0–28	28	8	3.5
16	Con O'Callaghan	Dublin	4–13	25	8	3.1
17	Donal Kingston	Laois	0–24	24	5	4.8
17	Luke Connolly	Cork	5-09	24	6	4
19	Paul Geaney	Kerry	2–17	23	8	2.9

=== Top scorer: single game ===
Rank	Player	County	Tally	Total	Opposition
1	Cormac Costello	Dublin	1–12	15	Louth
2	Dean Rock	Dublin	1–11	14	Roscommon
3	Bernard Allen	Offaly	0–11	11	London
3	Mark Collins	Cork	1-08	11	Laois
3	Seán O'Shea	Kerry	1-08	11	Meath
6	Mark Collins	Cork	0–10	10	Limerick
6	Donal Kingston	Laois	0–10	10	Cork
6	Seán O'Shea	Kerry	0–10	10	Dublin
6	Dean Rock	Dublin	0–10	10	Kerry
6	Michael Murphy	Donegal	1-07	10	Kerry
6	Adam Tyrrell	Kildare	1-07	10	Longford
6	Brian Hurley	Cork	2-04	10	Laois
13	Cormac Costello	Dublin	0-09	9	Kildare
13	Peter Harte	Tyrone	0-09	9	Longford
13	Shane McGuigan	Derry	1-06	9	Tyrone
13	Patrick McBrearty	Donegal	1-06	9	Meath
13	Mickey Newman	Meath	1-06	9	Carlow
13	Mickey Newman	Meath	1-06	9	Clare

=== Scoring events ===
- Widest winning margin: 26
  - Dublin 5–21 – 0–10 Louth (Leinster SFC)
- Most goals in a match: 7
  - Cork 3-09 – 4-09 Roscommon (Super 8s)
- Most points in a match: 40
  - Donegal 1–24 – 2–16 Cavan (Ulster SFC)
  - Kerry 1–20 – 1–20 Donegal (Super 8s)
  - Dublin 2–26 – 0–14 Roscommon (Super 8s)
  - Cavan 0–23 – 0–17 Armagh (Ulster SFC)
- Most goals by one team in a match: 5
  - Dublin 5–18 – 1–17 Cork (Super 8s)
  - Dublin 5–21 – 0–10 Louth (Leinster SFC)
- Highest aggregate score: 53 points
  - Dublin 5–18 – 1–17 Cork (Super 8s)
- Lowest aggregate score: 17 points
  - Clare 0-09 – 0-08 Waterford (Munster SFC)
- Lowest score by one team in a match: 4 points
  - New York 0-04 – 1–22 Mayo (Connacht SFC)
  - Dublin 1–17 – 0-04 Meath (Leinster SFC Final)

=== Miscellaneous ===
- Dublin became the first county to win a 9th provincial title in a row and 5 All-Ireland senior titles in a row.
- There were first time championship meetings for:
  - Westmeath vs Waterford
  - Leitrim vs Clare
  - Offaly vs Sligo
  - Cork vs Laois
  - Meath vs Clare
- Darren Mulhearne notably made his championship debut for Waterford against Clare in the 2019 Munster Senior Football Championship quarter-final at the age of 46, believed to be the oldest player to debut. Two of his opponents in that game, and fellow debutants, had a combined age that was less than that of Mulhearne. He kept a clean sheet, in a one-point loss. Mulhearne was called into the team after Aaron Beresford sustained an injury. Mulhearne had first been part of the Waterford senior team as a 17-year-old schoolboy, but never played.
- Meath scored 0–4 in the Leinster final, the lowest score by a team in a provincial final since 1985, when Laois scored 0–4 against Dublin.
- Meath reached the last eight for the first time since 2010
- Dublin and their manager Jim Gavin extended their record-breaking unbeaten streak to 37 consecutive championship games, as of 14 September 2019. Gavin later stood down as Dublin manager.
- Cavan reach their first Ulster final since 2001.

== Broadcast rights ==
RTÉ, the national broadcaster in Ireland, provided the majority of the live television coverage of the football championship in the second year of a five-year deal running from 2017 until 2021. Sky Sports also broadcast live games and had exclusive rights to a number of matches including some All-Ireland football super 8 matches. Both RTÉ and Sky Sports televised the two All-Ireland semi-finals and final live.

As of May 2019, BBC Northern Ireland planned to air four Ulster Championship games live: the Antrim–Tyrone quarter-final, the two semi-finals, and the final.

== Awards ==
All Star Team of the Year

Pos.	Player	Team	Appearances
GK	Stephen Cluxton^{FOTY}	Dublin	6
RCB	Michael Fitzsimons	Dublin	2
FB	Ronan McNamee	Tyrone	1
LCB	Tom O'Sullivan	Kerry	1
RWB	Patrick Durcan	Mayo	1
CB	Brian Howard	Dublin	2
LWB	Jack McCaffrey	Dublin	4
MD	Brian Fenton	Dublin	4
MD	David Moran	Kerry	2
RWF	Paul Mannion	Dublin	3
CF	Seán O'Shea	Kerry	1
LWF	Michael Murphy	Donegal	3
RCF	David Clifford	Kerry	2
FF	Cathal McShane	Tyrone	1
LCF	Con O'Callaghan	Dublin	2

Player has previously been selected.

County breakdown

- Dublin = 7
- Kerry = 4
- Tyrone = 2
- Mayo = 1
- Donegal = 1

List of nominees
