= Philips Sports Manager of the Year =

Philips Sports Manager of the Year

The Philips Sports Manager of the Year is an award for the person considered the most outstanding Irish sports manager or coach of a particular year.

The award is contested by the twelve winners of the year's Philips Sports Manager of the Month Awards, which are open to Irish sports managers, trainers or coaches, or overseas-born managers of Irish teams.

Because the annual ceremony is traditionally held in early December each year, the December winner from the previous year is eligible to compete.

Unusually, the award was instigated not by a sporting body or journalists' association, but by the event sponsors themselves, Philips in 1982.

There have been joint-winners twice. First in 1990, as the achievement of Cork GAA winning the first All-Ireland hurling and football double in exactly 100 years saw respective managers Fr. Michael O'Brien and Billy Morgan honoured. It happened again in 2015 when Irish soccer manager Martin O'Neill and Northern Irish soccer manager Michael O'Neill shared the award for qualifying their respective sides for the 2016 UEFA European Football Championship.

Jack Charlton is the most honoured manager since the award's inception, having won it four times during his tenure as Ireland soccer manager. Declan Kidney is the only person to have won the award for achievements with two different teams at different levels, while Brian Kerr was honoured for success with three different Irish national soccer teams. Joining Charlton, Kidney and Kerr as multi-award winners are Kilkenny hurling supremo Brian Cody and Dublin football supremo Jim Gavin.

== Winners ==
Year	Winner	Team	Sport
1982	Pat Henderson	Kilkenny	Hurling
1983	Brendan Edwards	Irish men's amateur golf	Golf
1984	Mick O'Dwyer	Kerry	Gaelic football
1985	Mick Doyle	Ireland	Rugby Union
1986	Jim McLaughlin	Shamrock Rovers	Association football
1987	Jack Charlton	Republic of Ireland	Association football
1988	Jack Charlton	Republic of Ireland	Association football
1989	Jack Charlton	Republic of Ireland	Association football
1990	Billy Morgan and Fr. Michael O'Brien	Cork	Gaelic football and hurling
1991	Pete McGrath	Down	Gaelic football
1992	Brian McEniff	Donegal	Gaelic football
1993	Jack Charlton	Republic of Ireland	Association football
1994	Eddie Jordan	Jordan GP	Formula One
1995	Ger Loughnane	Clare	Hurling
1996	Liam Griffin	Wexford	Hurling
1997	Brian Kerr	Republic of Ireland U20	Association football
1998	Brian Kerr	Republic of Ireland U16 & U18	Association football
1999	Seán Boylan	Meath	Gaelic football
2000	John Oxx	Sinndar's trainer	Horse racing
2001	Mick McCarthy	Republic of Ireland	Association football
2002	Joe Kernan	Armagh	Gaelic football
2003	Brian Cody	Kilkenny	Hurling
2004	Eddie O'Sullivan	Ireland	Rugby Union
2005	Mickey Harte	Tyrone	Gaelic football
2006	Declan Kidney	Munster	Rugby Union
2007	Paul Doolin	Drogheda United	Association football
2008	Declan Kidney	Munster	Rugby Union
2009	Declan Kidney	Ireland	Rugby Union
2010	Liam Sheedy	Tipperary	Hurling
2011	Giovanni Trapattoni	Republic of Ireland	Association football
2012	Billy Walsh and Pete Taylor	Ireland	Boxing
2013	Jim Gavin	Dublin	Gaelic football
2014	Joe Schmidt	Ireland	Rugby Union
2015	Martin O'Neill and Michael O'Neill	Republic of Ireland and Northern Ireland	Association football
2016	Stephen Kenny	Dundalk	Association football
2017	Micheál Donoghue	Galway	Hurling
2018	Joe Schmidt	Ireland	Rugby Union
2019	Jim Gavin	Dublin	Gaelic football

== Multiple winners ==
Rank	Manager	Wins
1st	Jack Charlton	4
2nd	Declan Kidney	3
3rd	Brian Kerr; Joe Schmidt; Jim Gavin	2

== Winners by sport ==
Sport	Wins
Association football	12
Gaelic football	8
Hurling	7
Rugby Union	7
Boxing	1
Formula One	1
Golf	1
