= 2006 All-Ireland Minor Football Championship =

Gaelic football competition

Championship details

All-Ireland Champions
- Winning team: Roscommon (4th win)

All-Ireland Finalists
- Losing team: Kerry

Provincial Champions
- Munster: Kerry
- Leinster: Meath
- Ulster: Donegal
- Connacht: Roscommon

The 2006 All-Ireland Minor Football Championship was the 75th staging of the All-Ireland Minor Football Championship, the Gaelic Athletic Association's premier inter-county Gaelic football tournament for boys under the age of 18.

Down entered the championship as defending champions, however, they were defeated by Cavan in the Ulster preliminary round.

On 23 September 2006, Roscommon won the championship following a 1-10 to 0-9 defeat of Kerry in the All-Ireland final. This was their fourth All-Ireland title overall and their first title in 55 championship seasons.

== Results ==
=== Connacht Minor Football Championship ===
Rob Robin

2006 Rob Robin	Mayo	0-8 - 1-8	Leitrim	Ballinamore

2006 Rob Robin	Roscommon	0-11 - 0-8	Leitrim	Dr. Hyde Park, Roscommon

2006 Rob Robin	Galway	2-7 - 1-7	Sligo	Milltown

2006 Rob Robin	Galway	2-11 - 1-8	Leitrim	St. Jarlath's Park, Tuam

2006 Rob Robin	Sligo	0-11 - 1-7	Mayo	Tourlestrane

2006 Rob Robin	Sligo	0-5 - 0-8	Roscommon	Elphin

2006 Rob Robin	Sligo	0-10 - 1-10	Leitrim	Markievicz Park, Sligo

2006 Rob Robin (Unfinished)	Sligo	0-6 - 1-1	Galway	Pearse Stadium, Galway

2006 Rob Robin Replay	Sligo	0-3 - 0-12	Galway

Semi-Finals

2006 Semi-Final	Roscommon	1-10 - 0-9	Galway

2006 Semi-Final	Leitrim	2-7 - 2-14	Mayo	Páirc Seán Mac Diarmada, Carrick-on-Shannon

Final

16 July 2006 Final	Roscommon	0-12 - 0-9	Mayo	McHale Park, Castlebar

=== Leinster Minor Football Championship ===
Rob Robin

2006 Rob Robin	Meath	2-10 - 2-8	Kildare

2006 Rob Robin	Laois	1-8 - 1-7	Dublin

2006 Rob Robin	Kilkenny	4-9 - 4-8	Carlow

2006 Rob Robin	Wicklow	0-10 - 0-5	Wexford

2006 Rob Robin	Longford	2-11 - 2-8	Louth

2006 Rob Robin	Dublin	2-17 - 2-8	Kildare

2006 Rob Robin	Westmeath	1-12 - 1-6	Louth

2006 Rob Robin	Wicklow	1-9 - 1-4	Kilkenny

2006 Rob Robin	Meath	1-12 - 1-7	Offaly

2006 Rob Robin	Westmeath	2-12 - 1-3	Longford

2006 Rob Robin	Kilkenny	2-9 - 0-4	Wexford

2006 Rob Robin	Meath	2-12 - 0-10	Laois

2006 Rob Robin	Louth	3-7 - 0-7	Wicklow

2006 Rob Robin	Offaly	1-12 - 2-6	Kildare

2006 Rob Robin	Wicklow	1-14 - 1-7	Carlow

2006 Rob Robin	Dublin	0-16 - 1-9	Offaly

2006 Rob Robin	Laois	0-5 - 0-3	Kildare

2006 Rob Robin	Westmeath	1-8 - 2-4	Wicklow

2006 Rob Robin	Louth	1-13 - 0-6	Carlow

2006 Rob Robin	Kilkenny	2-7 - 0-11	Longford

2006 Rob Robin	Dublin	1-7 - 0-9	Meath

2006 Rob Robin	Laois	2-9 - 2-8	Offaly

2006 Rob Robin	Wicklow	0-15 - 0-4	Wexford	Pearse Park, Arklow

2006 Rob Robin	Louth	5-8 - 0-12	Longford	Drogheda Park, Drogheda

2006 Rob Robin	Westmeath	4-11 - 0-2	Kilkenny	O'Moore Park, Portlaoise

2006 Rob Robin	Offaly	1-9 - 1-8	Carlow

2006 Rob Robin	Wexford	0-3 - 2-9	Louth	St. Patrick's Park, Enniscorthy

2006 Rob Robin	Carlow	1-11 - 1-4	Kilkenny	Nowlan Park, Kilkenny

2006 Rob Robin	Louth	2-9 - 1-13	Wicklow	Pearse Park, Arklow

2006 Rob Robin	Longford	3-15 - 1-3	Wexford	Pearse Park, Longford

2006 Rob Robin	Longford	1-17 - 1-11	Wicklow	Pearse Park, Longford

2006 Rob Robin	Westmeath	5-17 - 0-5	Carlow	Dr. Cullen Park, Carlow

2006 Rob Robin	Laois	0-10 - 0-3	Louth	O'Moore Park, Portlaoise

2006 Rob Robin	Dublin	1-11 - 0-11	Westmeath	Cusack Park, Mullingar

2006 Rob Robin	Kildare	0-9 - 0-11	Meath	St Conleth's Park, Newbridge

2006 Rob Robin	Wicklow	1-9 - 2-11	Offaly	Pearse Park, Arklow

Quarter-Final

2006 Quarter-Final	Wicklow	3-10 - 1-7	Longford	O'Moore Park, Portlaoise

Semi-Finals

2006 Semi-Final	Meath	0-11 - 1-9	Laois	St Conleth's Park, Newbridge

2006 Semi-Final	Dublin	0-10 - 2-5	Offaly	O'Moore Park, Portlaoise

Final

16 July 2006 Final	Meath	1-16 - 2-5	Offaly	Croke Park, Dublin

=== Munster Minor Football Championship ===
Quarter-Finals

2006 Quarter-Final	Cork	1-13 - 1-7	Clare	FitzGerald Park, Kilmallock

2006 Quarter-Final	Limerick	2-4 - 2-11	Waterford	Fraher Field, Dungarvan

2006 Quarter-Final	Clare	2-13 - 1-5	Waterford	St. Patrick's Park, Enniscorthy

2006 Quarter-Final	Kerry	2-10 - 2-7	Tipperary	Newcastlewest

2006 Quarter-Final	Clare	1-7 - 0-11	Tipperary	Gaelic Grounds, Limerick

Semi-Finals

2006 Semi-Final	Limerick	0-9 - 4-11	Kerry	Austin Stack Park, Tralee

2006 Semi-Final	Cork	2-6 - 2-7	Tipperary	Gaelic Grounds, Limerick

Final

9 July 2006 Final	Kerry	1-13 - 0-8	Tipperary	Fitzgerald Stadium, Killarney

=== Ulster Minor Football Championship ===
Rob Robin

2006 Rob Robin	Donegal	0-12 - 1-6	Fermanagh	Fr Tierney Park, Ballyshannon

2006 Rob Robin	Tyrone	0-10 - 1-8	Derry	Fr. Peter Campbell Park, Coalisland

2006 Rob Robin	Armagh	3-7 - 1-8	Monaghan	Carrickcruppen

2006 Rob Robin	Donegal	2-12 - 0-9	Derry	Celtic Park, Derry

2006 Rob Robin	Fermanagh	0-10 - 2-4	Antrim	St. Molaise Park, Irvinestown

2006 Rob Robin	Monaghan	2-11 - 2-9	Down	St Mary's Park, Castleblaney

2006 Rob Robin	Cavan	1-8 - 1-6	Armagh	Breffni Park, Cavan

2006 Rob Robin	Tyrone	1-2 - 0-11	Donegal	MacCumhaill Park, Ballybofey

2006 Rob Robin	Tyrone	1-7 - 1-5	Fermanagh	Healy Park, Omagh

2006 Rob Robin	Antrim	1-8 - 3-5	Donegal	Corrigan Park, Belfast

2006 Rob Robin	Down	3-8 - 2-10	Cavan	Pairc Esler, Newry

2006 Rob Robin	Armagh	1-10 - 2-6	Cavan	St Tiernach's Park, Clones

2006 Rob Robin	Down	1-13 - 1-16	Cavan	Casement Park, Belfast

2006 Rob Robin	Monaghan	1-6 - 0-10	Armagh	St Tiernach's Park, Clones

2006 Rob Robin	Antrim	0-9 - 0-8	Fermanagh	Brewster Park, Enniskillen

Quarter-Finals

2006 Quarter-Final	Donegal	0-12 - 0-6	Cavan	Brewster Park, Enniskillen

2006 Quarter-Final	Derry	0-10 - 1-10	Tyrone	Healy Park, Omagh

Semi-Final

2006 Semi-Final	Donegal	0-11 - 1-5	Tyrone	St Tiernach's Park, Clones

Final

9 July 2006 Final	Donegal	2-12 - 1-5	Antrim	Croke Park, Dublin

=== All-Ireland Minor Football Championship ===
Quarter-finals

August 2006 Quarter-Final	Donegal	0-17 - 1-13	Offaly	St Tiernach's Park, Clones

August 2006 Quarter-Final	Meath	1-17 - 2-10	Antrim	St Tiernach's Park, Clones

August 2006 Quarter-Final	Roscommon	1-12 - 0-5	Tipperary	O'Connor Park, Tullamore

August 2006 Quarter-Final	Kerry	2-7 - 0-9	Mayo	Cusack Park, Ennis

Semi-finals

20 August 2006 Semi-Final	Kerry	2-13 - 1-10	Donegal	Croke Park, Dublin

27 August 2006 Semi-Final	Roscommon	1-10 - 0-9	Meath	Croke Park, Dublin

Finals

17 September 2006 Final	Roscommon	0-15 - 0-15	Kerry	Croke Park, Dublin

23 September 2006 Final replay	Roscommon	1-10 - 0-09	Kerry	Cusack Park, Ennis
