= Tom Cunniffe =

Mayo Gaelic footballer

Personal information
- Native name: Tomas Ó Conduibh (Irish)
- Born: Castlebar, Ireland
- Height: 1.96 m (6 ft 5 in)

Sport
- Sport: Gaelic football
- Position: Right Corner Back
Club
- Years: Club
- Castlebar Mitchels
Club titles
- Mayo titles: 1
- Connacht titles: 1
Inter-county
- Years: County
- 2007–: Mayo
Inter-county titles
- Connacht titles: 5
- All-Irelands: 0
- NFL: 0
- All Stars: 0

Tom Cunniffe is a Gaelic footballer who plays for Castlebar Mitchels and the Mayo county team.

He started at right corner-back in the 2013 All-Ireland final, which Mayo lost by one point to Dublin.

Cunniffe later became one of the "well-known names on the New York side" that competes in the Connacht Senior Football Championship, according to the Irish Independent.
