= Jim Gavin =

Dublin Gaelic footballer and manager

Commandant Jim Gavin
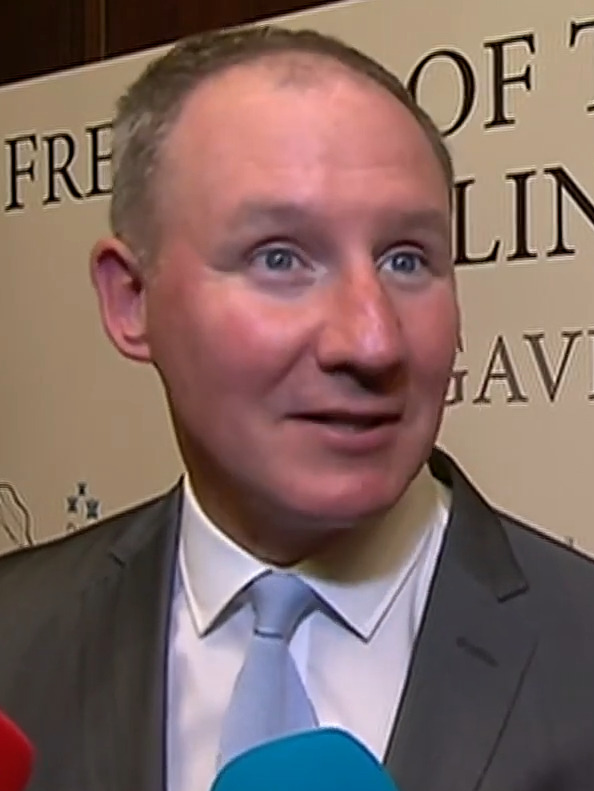
- Gavin in 2020

Personal details
- Born: 1 July 1971 (age 55) Dublin, Ireland
- Party: Fianna Fáil
- Spouse: Jennifer Gavin (m. 2000)
- Children: 2

Military service
- Allegiance: Ireland
- Branch/service: Air Corps
- Years of service: 1990–2011
- Rank: Commandant (OF-3)
- Commands: Chief Flying Instructor, Flying Training School; Chief of Military Aviation MINURCAT
- Battles/wars: MINURCAT (Chad)
- Gaelic games career
- Occupations: COO Irish Aviation Authority; Retired Military Officer
- Height: 1.78 m (5 ft 10 in)
- Sport: Gaelic football
- Position: Right half-forward
Club
- Years: Club
- Round Towers Clondalkin
Inter-county
Years	County	Apps (scores)
1992–2002	Dublin	25 (0–29)
Inter-county titles
- Leinster titles: 3
- All-Irelands: 1
- NFL: 1
- All Stars: 0

Jim Gavin (born 1 July 1971) is an Irish public servant, politician, retired military officer and former Gaelic football player and manager.

Gavin made his inter-county debut at the age of 16 for the Dublin minor team. In 1993, he joined the Dublin senior team, with which he won an All-Ireland SFC medal, three Leinster SFC medals, and a National League medal. After retiring from inter-county football following the 2002 championship, he transitioned to team management. Over the next decade, he led the Dublin under-21 county team to three All-Ireland U21FC titles, in 2003, 2010 and 2012.

In October 2012, Gavin succeeded Pat Gilroy as manager of the Dublin senior county team. He led the team through a seven-year period of unprecedented provincial and national dominance that included five National League titles, seven consecutive Leinster SFC titles and six All-Ireland SFC titles (a record five consecutively). Widely regarded as one of the best managers in Gaelic football's history, he is the county's most successful manager in terms of major titles won. He stepped down from the role in November 2019 and was awarded the Freedom of the City of Dublin in January 2020. He subsequently chaired the Football Review Committee, established by the GAA to reform the rules of Gaelic football.

Outside sports, Gavin joined the Defence Forces at age 18 as a cadet. He rose to become a senior officer in the Irish Air Corps, including roles in UN peacekeeping, before retiring from the military in 2011. He subsequently joined the Irish Aviation Authority, where he serves as chief operations officer. He was the Fianna Fáil nominee in the 2025 Irish presidential election but discontinued his campaign amid controversy over an unpaid debt to a former tenant.

== Early life ==
Gavin was born in the Clonburris area of Clondalkin. His parents are both from west County Clare - his father Jim Senior is originally from Cree and his mother Ann (née Vaughan) is from Moy. His father previously won a county championship with Cooraclare GAA in 1964, and coached neighbourhood teams in the local street leagues at various levels. His grandfathers both fought in the Irish War of Independence.

Jim represented Clonburris Primary School in Gaelic games, winning six out of six Cumann na mBunscoil finals in Croke Park - three in football and three in hurling.

At 18, Gavin joined the Irish Defence Forces as a cadet. He subsequently rose to the senior officer level of Commandant. In this role he served as a part of the senior leadership of the UN's peacekeeping mission in Chad.

== GAA ==
=== Playing career ===
Gavin attended Moyle Park College, where he played for the college team. His performances for Round Towers caught the eye of the Dublin selectors, making his senior debut in 1993.

His subsequent military pilot training with the Irish Air Corps ruled him out of any involvement with the under-21 side. With Dublin, Gavin won the 1995 All-Ireland Senior Football Championship.

=== Managerial career ===
Jim Gavin
Sport
- Sport: Gaelic football
		–	–
Inter-county management
- Years: Team
- 2012–2019: Dublin
Inter-county titles as manager
County	League	Province	All-Ireland
Dublin	6	7	7

In 2009, he coached Dublin to a Leinster Under 21 Football Championship and progressed to the All-Ireland semi-final where they lost to Cork. He repeated the Leinster victory in 2010, going one better than the previous year by winning the All-Ireland Under 21 Football Championship final. His selectors were Declan Darcy, Shane O'Hanlon and Jim Brogan.

Gavin was ratified as senior football manager on 1 October 2012, replacing Pat Gilroy and signing a three-year contract (2013–2015). Mick Deegan, Davy Byrne and Declan Darcy were his selectors for 2013. On 28 April 2013, Dublin won the first of four consecutive National Football League titles a 0–18 to 0–17 win against Tyrone at Croke Park. Then he complained that things were "too drawn out". He led Dublin to the 2013 All-Ireland Senior Football Championship final, with the team defeating Kerry in the semi-final on a scoreline of 3–18 to 3–11. Dublin won the final on 22 September 2013, beating Mayo by 2–12 to 1–14. In December 2013, Gavin was named the 2013 Philips Sports Manager of the Year.

Dublin could not defend that title though in 2014, Donegal comprehensively defeating Gavin's team by a scoreline of 3–14 (23) 0–17 (17), in an All-Ireland SFC semi-final on 31 August which went into the record books as Gavin's only championship defeat as Dublin senior manager.

Dublin again beat Kerry, this time by 0–12 to 0–9, in the 2015 All-Ireland Senior Football Championship final, to win a second All-Ireland SFC title in three years. The following year, in September 2016, Mayo held Dublin to a 2–9 to 0–15 draw in the 2016 All-Ireland Senior Football Championship final, but prevailed by a scoreline of 1–15 to 1–14 in the replay in October, winning back-to-back All-Ireland SFC titles, and a third title in four years. In September 2017, he led Dublin to a third consecutive All-Ireland SFC title, his team again defeating Mayo by a scoreline of 1–17 to 1–16. This was Gavin's fourth All-Ireland SFc title as the Dublin manager. In 2018, he led Dublin to a fourth consecutive All-Ireland SFC title, Dublin defeating Tyrone by a scoreline of 2–17 to 1–14. This was Gavin's fifth All-Ireland SFC title as Dublin manager. In 2019, he led Dublin to an unprecedented fifth consecutive All-Ireland SFC title, Dublin defeating Kerry by a scoreline of 1–18 to 0–15 in the replay, after a drawn game. This was Gavin's sixth and last All-Ireland SFC title as Dublin manager.

Under Gavin's management, the Dublin senior football team established a new record for most National League and Championship games unbeaten. When defeating Roscommon by a scoreline of 2–29 to 0–14 in a March 2017 National League game at Croke Park, Dublin set a new record of playing 35 games in league and championship without defeat. They extended this unbeaten run to 36 games a week later with a win away to Monaghan in the National League. That 36-game unbeaten run came to an end on 10 April 2017 in the National League final, which Dublin lost by a single point (0–20 to 1–16) to Kerry, the previous holder of that record, which had stood for 84 years.

Gavin announced his decision to end his time as manager on 30 November 2019. He informed his players at Innisfails in Balgriffin on a Saturday evening that month. Assessment of Gavin's term as Dublin manager has seen him described as one of the greatest managers in Gaelic football history.

=== Rules Committee ===
In February 2024, he was appointed chairman of the Football Review Committee which was established by the GAA to reform the rules of football. In the aftermath of the 2025 All-Ireland Championship, these changes were hailed for improving the sport as a spectacle and Gavin was praised for his skill in both developing the proposals and winning support from previously reluctant provincial and county structures.

== Military career ==
In 1990 at the age of 18, Gavin joined the Irish Defence Forces as an Air Corps Cadet and spent 18 months in the Cadet School completing an infantry officers course prior to being posted to the Air Corps and undertaking pilot training. Gavin served in the Air Corps for 20 years, rising to Chief Flying Instructor. Gavin spent time as Chief Pilot in the Ministerial Air Transport Squadron. Gavin served as Chief of Military Aviation with the United Nations Mission in the Central African Republic and Chad (MINURCAT), overseeing air assets and coordinating international support. Gavin rose the rank of Commandant and retired from the Defence Forces in 2011. Gavin frequently cites his military training and experience as being formative in his success in Gaelic football management.

== Public service career ==
Gavin is a qualified commercial pilot, and following the conclusion of his military career and after his retirement as Dublin manager, he started working for the Irish Aviation Authority as a director of people and operations, rising to the level of Chief Operations Officer, making him the person with operational responsibility for air safety in Ireland.

In 2022, Gavin was appointed to chair a citizen's assembly on a directly elected mayor for Dublin. The assembly outlined a case in favour of reforms to local government in Dublin which were required, it argued, to significantly improve services in the city and county of Dublin.

Since 2023 Gavin has served as the chairperson of the North-East Inner City Taskforce, a body which brings together public and community organisations to plan and implement service and facilities developments in Ireland's most disadvantaged community.

== 2025 presidential campaign ==
2025 Jim Gavin presidential campaign
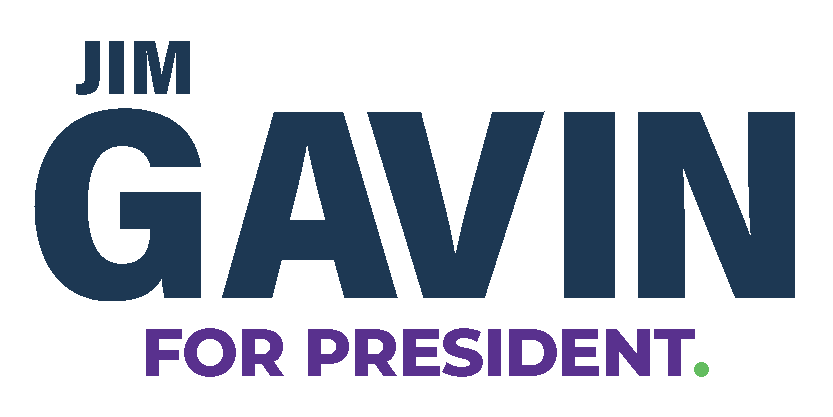
- Campaign: President of Ireland in the 2025 Irish presidential election
- Candidate: Jim Gavin, Gaelic football manager of Dublin (2012–2019)
- Affiliation: Fianna Fáil
- Status: Announcement: 30 August 2025; Nominated by Fianna Fáil: 9 September 2025; Campaign launch: 28 September 2025; Withdrawal: 5 October 2025

Website
- jimgavinforpresident.ie

On 25 August 2025, the Irish Independent reported that members of Fianna Fáil had approached Gavin to consider standing as a candidate in the 2025 Irish presidential election. On 30 August, he wrote to parliamentary party members seeking their nomination for candidacy. On the same day, Micheál Martin, leader of Fianna Fáil, confirmed his endorsement of Gavin.

On 9 September 2025, Gavin was confirmed as Fianna Fáil's nominee, beating Billy Kelleher MEP in a vote of the 71 members of the parliamentary party.

Gavin made early-campaign statements on Israeli military objectives in the Gaza War that were criticised by Sinn Féin politicians. These criticisms were rejected by Gavin's campaign who described them as distortions and negative campaigning. He has referred to Israel's behaviour as genocidal and called for a massive humanitarian intervention.

Numerous derogatory posts on social media targeted Gavin during his presidential campaign. A user who described himself as a "Trump loyalist" and a "right-wing environmentalist" shared unverified claims about Gavin's personal life. The posts were viewed hundreds of thousands of times on various platforms like X, TikTok, and Meta's Instagram and Facebook. The campaign office stated that the allegations were "invented and utterly false". Meta acted and removed the posts; however, TikTok and X did not take similar action.

On the evening of 5 October 2025, 19 days before the election, Gavin announced that he was withdrawing from the presidential election campaign. This followed a controversy over his failure to pay back a former tenant who had overpaid rent by €3,300. On 10 October 2025, it was revealed that Gavin had repaid the €3,300 he owed to the former tenant. His name remained on the ballot. He received 103,568 (7.2%) votes, and in the process failed to reach the threshold quota required for campaign refunds.

== Political views ==
Gavin has described himself as a "centrist" and a "constitutional republican". Gavin supports abolishing the triple lock.

== Personal life ==
Gavin is married to Jennifer; the couple live in Dublin with their two children, a son and a daughter.

In 2019, Gavin received an honorary doctorate from Dublin City University, and in 2020 he was made a Freeman of the City of Dublin.

== Career statistics ==
=== Manager ===
As of match played 1 October 2016.

Team	From	To	O'Byrne Cup				National League				Leinster SFC				All-Ireland SFC				Total				
Team	From	To	G	W	D	L	G	W	D	L	G	W	D	L	G	W	D	L	G	W	D	L	Win %
Dublin	1 October 2012	30 December 2019	17	12	0	5	44	32	6	6	15	15	0	0	13	10	2	1	88	69	7	12	83%

== Honours ==
=== Military ===
- United Nations Mission in the Central African Republic and Chad (MINURCAT) Medal; one of only 3 Irish Officers to serve in CAR
- United Nations Peacekeepers Medal

=== Civilian ===
- Freedom of the City of Dublin by Dublin City Council: 2020

=== Player ===
Dublin

- All-Ireland Senior Football Championship (1): 1995
- Leinster Senior Football Championship (3): 1993, 1994, 1995
- National Football League (1): 1992–93

=== Manager ===
Dublin

- All-Ireland Senior Football Championship (6): 2013, 2015, 2016, 2017, 2018, 2019
- Leinster Senior Football Championship (7): 2013, 2014, 2015, 2016, 2017, 2018, 2019
- National Football League (5): 2013, 2014, 2015, 2016, 2018
- O'Byrne Cup (1): 2015
- All-Ireland Under-21 Football Championship (3): 2003, 2010, 2012
- Leinster Under-21 Football Championship (3): 2003, 2010, 2012

Individual

- Philips Sports Manager of the Year (2): 2013, 2019
- RTÉ Sports Manager of the Year Award (1): 2019

Achievements
Preceded by Jim McGuinness (Donegal)	All-Ireland SFC winning manager 2013	Succeeded by Éamonn Fitzmaurice (Kerry)
Preceded by Éamonn Fitzmaurice (Kerry)	All-Ireland SFC winning manager 2015–2019	Succeeded by Dessie Farrell (Dublin)
Sporting positions
Preceded by	Dublin Under-21 Football Manager; 2007–2012	Succeeded by Dessie Farrell
Preceded by Pat Gilroy	Dublin Senior Football Manager; 2012–2019	Succeeded by Dessie Farrell
