= Paul Nugent (Gaelic footballer) =

Irish Gaelic footballer

Paul Nugent is a former Gaelic footballer who played at senior level for the Dublin county team. He was one of the selectors for the Dublin senior football team during Pat Gilroy's first season in charge in 2009. He played inter-county football for Dublin between 1988 and 1991, and played club football with Thomas Davis (winning three Dublin Senior Football Championship medals with them in 1989, 1990 and 1991). He also played with the Dublin Junior team, which reached the All-Ireland JFC final in 1987, but failed to beat eventual winners Cork. Nugent was Thomas Davis senior football manager until Mick Bolan's appointment in December 2003.
