= Mickey Whelan =

Gaelic footballer and manager

Mickey Whelan is former selector on the senior Dublin county team, he was a selector for Pat Gilroy who played for him while he managed St Vincent's. He is a former player and manager of Dublin and St Vincent's senior football teams. He is a former player for Clanna Gael and won a Dublin Senior Football Championship medal with them in 1968.

== Playing career ==
Whelan won a Cú Chulainn award for his performances with the Dublin senior football team in 1963. He was on the All-Ireland winning side for Dublin in 1963. He has won four Leinster Senior Football Championship medals with Dublin in 1959, 1962, 1963 and 1965.

Whelan had a very successful playing career with his clubs, he first won the Dublin Senior Football Championship with Clanna Gael in 1968. Then, he went on to win the Dublin championship with St Vincents in 1976 and 1977. He won a Leinster Senior Club Football Championship and All-Ireland Senior Club Football Championship with Vinnies during 1975-76.

== Managerial career ==
Whelan's managerial success began in 2004, when he guided St Vincents to the Dublin U-21 Football Championship. Whelan was the Dublin senior football manager between 1995 and 1997. In 2006, as St Vincents manager, he brought his side to the final of the Dublin football championship. In the semi-final on October 30, 2006 at Parnell Park, his team brushed aside northside rivals Na Fianna and go on to contest UCD in the final which they eventually lost. 2007 proved more successful, Whelan won the Dublin Senior Football Championship as manager of St Vincents. Mickey then went on to manage St Vincents to a win the Leinster Senior Club Football Championship final against Tyrrellspass of Westmeath. Whelan won the 2008 All-Ireland Senior Club Football Championship with St Vincent's as manager. Whelan stepped down as manager of St Vincents only two weeks after their historic all-Ireland victory over Nemo Rangers in 2008. When Pat Gilroy was appointed as Dublin senior football manager in 2008, Whelan was chosen as one of his selectors. This happened only a few months after Mickey had managed Pat to win the All-Ireland Senior Club Football Championship. Whelan was also a selector previously with Dublin for the minor footballers in 2003.

Preceded by Pat O'Neill	Dublin Senior Football Manager; 1995–1997	Succeeded by Tommy Carr
Achievements
Preceded by Donal Murtagh (Crossmaglen Rangers)	All-Ireland Club SFC winning manager 2008	Succeeded by Paddy Carr (Kilmacud Crokes)
