= Aidan O'Shea (Mayo Gaelic footballer) =

Irish Gaelic footballer

Personal information
- Native name: Aodán Ó Sé (Irish)
- Born: 29 June 1990 (age 36) Mullingar, County Westmeath, Ireland
- Occupation: Export Manager
- Height: 1.93 m (6 ft 4 in)

Sport
- Sport: Gaelic football
- Position: Forward
Club
- Years: Club
- 2007–: Breaffy
Club titles
- Mayo titles: 0
College
- Years: College
- 2009–2013: Dublin Institute of Technology
College titles
- Sigerson titles: 1
Inter-county*
Years	County	Apps (scores)
2009–	Mayo	104 (14–57)
Inter-county titles
- Connacht titles: 8
- All-Irelands: 1
- NFL: 2
- All Stars: 3
- *Inter County team apps and scores correct as of 18:00, 26 July 2026.

Aidan O'Shea (born 29 June 1990) is an Irish Gaelic footballer who plays for Breaffy and the Mayo county team. In May 2026 he became the first outfield player to make 100 senior championship appearances, and only the second player of any kind after Stephen Cluxton.

== Playing career ==
O'Shea played for the Mayo minor team during the 2000s.

He made his senior inter-county debut against New York in 2009 and, since then, has won three All Stars and played in numerous All-Ireland Senior Football Championship (SFC) finals.

O'Shea played in midfield in two All-Ireland SFC finals, the 2012 decider, which Mayo lost by 0–13 to 2–11 against Donegal and the 2013 decider, which Mayo lost by 1–14 to 2–12 against Dublin. In 2013, his man-of-the-match display drove Mayo to victory in a rematch against 2012 conquerors Donegal at the All-Ireland SFC quarter-final stage. He was afterwards refused entry at one of Dublin's biggest nightclubs. He was awarded the GAA's Player of the Month for August 2013. O'Shea won an All-Star in 2013, at midfield, and further All Stars in 2015 and 2017.

He is suspected of being concussed up to seven times. In 2016, Mayo were denied another All-Ireland SFC title by just one point to Dublin after the 2016 All-Ireland SFC final replay on 1 October. Coincidentally, the following year, Mayo lost again against Dublin in the 2017 All-Ireland SFC final by another one-point margin. O'Shea was on the losing side in the All-Ireland SFC finals of 2012, 2013, 2016, 2017, 2020 and 2021.

O'Shea played in the first Test for Ireland against Australia in the 2013 International Rules Series, but club commitments ruled him out of the second Test.

=== Championship appearance record ===
On 31 May 2026, O'Shea came on as a second-half substitute in Mayo's 1–24 to 2–20 All-Ireland SFC Round 1 win over Monaghan at St Tiernach's Park, Clones, making his 100th senior championship appearance. He was the first outfield player to reach the mark and the second player overall after the Dublin goalkeeper Stephen Cluxton, whose total stood at 128. Since his debut in 2009 he had missed only one championship match, the 2012 Connacht semi-final against Leitrim, leaving him on a run of 89 consecutive championship appearances.

=== 2026 season ===
Mayo were beaten by Roscommon by 2–25 to 1–18 in the Connacht semi-final, having opened with a 0–31 to 1–15 win over London. In the All-Ireland series they beat Monaghan, lost to Tyrone by 0–22 to 1–18, and beat Meath by 0–22 to 2–13. Mayo then defeated Cork by 0–23 to 0–18 in the quarter-final at Croke Park on 27 June and Louth by 3–23 to 0–15 in the semi-final on 11 July, reaching the All-Ireland final for the first time since 2021. O'Shea was named among the substitutes for the final against Kerry, played at Croke Park on 26 July 2026.

On 26 July 2026, O'Shea won the 2026 All-Ireland Football Championship with Mayo.

== Personal life ==
O'Shea has family connections in County Kerry. His father Jim O'Shea has managed Breaffy.

O'Shea had a relationship with Sarah Rowe, the Mayo ladies' Gaelic footballer. In the summer of 2023, he got engaged to Kristin McKenzie Vass, and the couple married in Kerry on 9 August 2024. He has two children, the second born in early 2026.

== Career statistics ==
As of match played 6 April 2025.

Team	Year	National League			Connacht		All-Ireland		Total	
Team	Year	Division	Apps	Score	Apps	Score	Apps	Score	Apps	Score
Mayo	2009	Division 1	6	2-03	3	2-04	1	1-01	10	5-08
Mayo	2010	Division 1	8	2-04	1	0-00	1	0-00	10	2-04
Mayo	2011	Division 1	5	0-03	3	0-00	2	0-00	10	0-03
Mayo	2012	Division 1	5	0-01	1	0-01	3	0-01	9	0-03
Mayo	2013	Division 1	8	0-04	3	0-01	3	0-01	14	0-06
Mayo	2014	Division 1	7	0-05	3	0-02	3	1-00	13	1-07
Mayo	2015	Division 1	7	1-08	2	3-05	3	1-01	12	5-14
Mayo	2016	Division 1	7	0-04	2	0-01	6	1-03	15	1-08
Mayo	2017	Division 1	2	0-00	2	0-00	8	0-07	12	0-07
Mayo	2018	Division 1	7	1-01	1	0-00	3	0-03	11	1-04
Mayo	2019	Division 1	8	0-02	2	0-00	7	0-01	17	0-03
Mayo	2020	Division 1	7	0-05	3	0-03	2	0-01	12	0-09
Mayo	2021	Division 2	2	0-01	3	2-03	2	0-00	7	2-04
Mayo	2022	Division 1	8	0-00	1	0-00	3	0-01	12	0-01
Mayo	2023	Division 1	8	1-06	1	0-01	5	0-08	14	1-15
Mayo	2024	Division 1			3	1-02	4	0-02	7	1-04
Mayo	2025	Division 1			1	1-02			1	1-02
Career total			95	7-47	35	9-25	56	4-30	186	20-102

== Honours ==
Dublin Institute of Technology

- Sigerson Cup: 2013

Mayo

- All-Ireland Senior Football Championship: 2026
- Connacht Senior Football Championship: 2009, 2011, 2012, 2013, 2014, 2015, 2020 (c), 2021 (c)
- National Football League: (2) 2019, 2023
- Connacht Under-21 Football Championship: 2009
- Connacht Minor Football Championship: 2008
- FBD League: 2010, 2011, 2012, 2023

Ireland

- International Rules Series: 2013, 2015

Individual

- All Star: 2013, 2015, 2017
- GAA/GPA Player of the Month: August 2013

Sporting positions
Preceded by Diarmuid O'Connor	Mayo Senior Football Captain; 2020–2021	Succeeded by Stephen Coen
