= 2017 Mayo county football team season =

Mayo county football team
2017 season
- Manager: Stephen Rochford
- Stadium: MacHale Park, Castlebar
- NFL D1: 5th
- All-Ireland SFC: Finalist
- Connacht SFC: Semi-finalist
- FBD Insurance League: Group stage (2nd)

The following is a summary of Mayo county football team's 2017 season.

== 2017 All-Ireland Senior Football Championship ==
=== Fixtures ===
21 May 2017
14:00
Connacht Quarter-Final

| Mayo | 2-14 – 0-11 | Sligo |
|---|---|---|
| Cillian O'Connor 1-6 (0-5f), Diarmuid O'Connor 1-0, Fergal Boland and Andy Moran 0-2 each, Patrick Durcan, Kevin McLoughlin, Jason Doherty, Danny Kirby 0-1 each | Report | Adrian Marren 0-4 (0-2f, 1 '45), Mark Breheny (0-2f) and Stephen Coen 0-2 each, Aidan Devaney (0-1f), Paddy O'Connor, Niall Murphy 0-1 each |

MacHale Park, Castlebar
Attendance: 14,661
Referee: Sean Hurson (Tyrone)
11 June 2017
16:00
Connacht Semi-Final

| Galway | 0-15 – 1-11 | Mayo |
|---|---|---|
| Sean Armstong 0-6 (3f, 3 '45), Damien Comer 0-2, G Sice 0-2 (2f), G Bradshaw, Johnny Heaney, Shane Walsh, Michael Daly, Eamonn Brannigan 0-1 each. | Report | Cillian O'Connor 0-6 (5f), Kevin McLoughlin 1-1, Paddy Durcan, Fergal Boland, Diarmuid O'Connor, Andy Moran 0-1 each. |

Pearse Stadium, Galway
Attendance: 22,046
Referee: Joe McQuillan (Cavan)
1 July 2017
5:00 PM
Qualifier Round 2A

| Mayo | 2-21 – 1-13 (AET) | Derry |
|---|---|---|
| Cillian O’Connor 0-12 (0-9f, 1 '45); Conor Loftus 1-1, Jason Doherty 1-1, Andy Moran 0-2, Kevin McLoughlin, Aidan O'Shea, Diarmuid O’Connor, Lee Keegan, Patrick Durcan 0-1 each | Report | Niall Loughlin 0-6 (5f), Mark Lynch 1-1, Ryan Bell 0-3, Benny Heron, James Kielt, Danny Heavron 0-1 each |

MacHale Park, Castlebar
Attendance: 11,433
Referee: M Deegan (Laois)
8 July 2017
5.00 PM
Qualifier Round 3A

| Mayo | 2-14 – 0-13 | Clare |
|---|---|---|
| Cillian O’Connor 1-5 (5f), Diarmuid O’Connor 1-1, Andy Moran 0-3, Kevin McLoughlin 0-2, Lee Keegan, Keith Higgins, and Aidan O’Shea 0-1 each | Report | David Tubridy 0-4 (4fs), Eoin Cleary 0-3 (2fs), Keelan Sexton 0-2 (1 45), Jamie Malone, Sean Collins, Gary Brennan, and Gearoid O’Brien 0-1 each |

Cusack Park, Ennis
Attendance: 11,576
Referee: Sean Hurson (Tyrone)
22 July
5:00pm
Qualifier Round 4A

| Mayo | 0-27 – 2-20 (AET) | Cork |
|---|---|---|
| Cillian O’Connor 0-11 (0-4f, 1 '45), Andy Moran 0-4, Aidan O’Shea 0-3, Patrick Durcan and Conor Loftus 0-2 each, Keith Higgins, Lee Keegan, Tom Parsons, Diarmuid O'Connor, Jason Doherty 0-1 each | Report | Donncha O'Connor 0-6 (0-4f), Luke Connolly 1-1 (0-1f), Sean Powter 1-0, John O'Rourke, Paul Kerrigan, Colm O'Neill (0-1f) 0-3 each, Michael Hurley 0-2, Tomas Clancy and Barry O'Driscoll 0-1 each |

Gaelic Grounds, Limerick
Attendance: 13,505
Referee: Ciaran Branagan (Down)
30 July
4:00 pm
All-Ireland Quarter-final

| Mayo | 1-12 – 2-9 | Roscommon |
|---|---|---|
| Lee Keegan 1-3, Cillian O'Connor 0-3 (0-2f), Patrick Durcan and Andy Moran 0-2 each, Colm Boyle and Jason Doherty 0-1 each | Report | Ciaran Murtagh 1-2 (0-2f), Fintan Cregg 1-1, Diarmuid Murtagh and Donie Smith (0-1f) 0-2 each, Enda Smith and Conor Devaney 0-1 each |

Croke Park, Dublin
Attendance: 65,746
Referee: Joe McQuillan (Cavan)
7 August
2:00 pm
All-Ireland Quarter-final Replay

| Mayo | 4-19 – 0-9 | Roscommon |
|---|---|---|
| Cillian O’Connor 1-6 (0-5f), Andy Moran 1-1, Keith Higgins and Kevin McLoughlin 1-0 each, Aidan O’Shea, Jason Doherty, Shane Nally 0-2 each, Donal Vaughan, Chris Barrett, Tom Parsons, Diarmuid O’Connor, David Drake, Stephen Coen 0-1 each | Report | Diarmuid Murtagh 0-4 (0-2f), Sean Mullooly, Enda Smith, Niall Kilroy, Conor Devaney, Donie Smith 0-1 each |

Croke Park, Dublin
Attendance: 39,154
Referee: Anthony Nolan (Wicklow)
20 August
3:30 pm
All-Ireland Semi-final

| Mayo | 2-14 – 2-14 | Kerry |
|---|---|---|
| Andy Moran 1-5, Cillian O’Connor 0-4 (0-1f), Colm Boyle 1-0, Tom Parsons 0-2, Donal Vaughan, Jason Doherty, Patrick Durcan 0-1 each | Report | Paul Geaney 0-7 (0-4f), Johnny Buckley, Stephen O’Brien 1-0 each, James O’Donoghue 0-3 (0-2f), Killian Young, Paul Murphy, Kieran Donaghy, Barry John Keane 0-1 each |

Croke Park, Dublin
Attendance: 66,195
Referee: Maurice Deegan (Laois)
26 August
3:00 pm
All-Ireland Semi-final Replay

| Mayo | 2-16 – 0-17 | Kerry |
|---|---|---|
| Cillian O'Connor 0-6f, Andy Moran 1-1, Diarmuid O'Connor 1-0, Jason Doherty 0-3 (0-1f, 1 '45), Kevin McLoughlin and Conor Loftus 0-2 each, Chris Barrett and Patrick Durcan 0-1 each | Report | Paul Geaney 0-9 (0-7f), James O'Donoghue 0-3 (0-1f), Jack Barry, Jonathan Lyne, Johnny Buckley, Fionn Fitzgerald 0-1 each |

Croke Park, Dublin
Attendance: 53,032
Referee: David Gough (Meath)
