= 2016 Mayo county football team season =

Mayo county football team
2016 season
- Manager: Stephen Rochford
- Stadium: MacHale Park, Castlebar
- NFL D1: 5th
- All-Ireland SFC: Finalist (replay)
- Connacht SFC: Semi-finalist
- FBD Insurance League: Group stage (2nd)
- Top goalscorer: League: All: Cillian O'Connor (2–28)

The following is a summary of Mayo county football team's 2016 season. It was a first season in charge for newly appointed Mayo manager Stephen Rochford.

== Kits ==
Home	Change

== Competitions ==
Win Draw Loss Postponed/Cancelled

== FBD League ==
=== Fixtures ===
Date	Round	Home	Score	Away	Ground	References
3 Jan	Group	Mayo	1-12 v 1-10	NUIG	McHale Park, Castlebar	
10 Jan	Group	Mayo	1-16 v 0-8	IT Sligo	Ballina	
17 Jan	Group	Mayo	0-13 v 0-10	Roscommon	McHale Park, Castlebar	

=== Table ===
Qualification for next round

Team	Pld	W	D	L	F	A	Diff	Pts
Roscommon	3	3	0	0	0-25	0-10	+20	6
Mayo	3	2	0	1	2-31	0-13	+10	4
NUI Galway	3	1	0	2	4-10	1-24	+10	2
IT Sligo	3	0	0	3	0-14	5-26	-40	0

== National Football League Division 1 ==
=== Fixtures ===
Date	Round	Home	Score	Away	Ground	References
31 Jan	Group	Cork	0-12 v 1-18	Mayo	Páirc Ui Rinn, Cork	
6 Feb	Group	Mayo	0-7 v 0-9	Dublin	McHale Park, Castlebar	
28 Feb	Group	Donegal	1-14 v 1-12	Mayo	MacCumhaill Park, Ballybofey	
6 Mar	Group	Monaghan	1-12 v 2-11	Mayo	Castleblayney	
13 Mar	Group	Mayo	0-14 v 2-13	Kerry	McHale Park, Castlebar	
27 Mar	Group	Roscommon	1-7 v 1-11	Mayo	Dr. Hyde Park, Roscommon	
3 Apr	Group	Mayo	1-19 v 1-16	Down	MacHale Park, Castlebar	

=== Table ===
Compete in Division 1 semi-finals
Automatic relegation to Division 2

Team	Pld	W	D	L	F	A	Diff	Pts
Dublin	7	7	0	0	8-91	4-75	28	14
Kerry	7	5	0	2	5-109	5-77	32	10
Roscommon	7	4	0	3	9-98	8-77	24	8
Donegal	7	3	0	4	8-84	6-78	12	6
Mayo	7	3	0	4	5-88	7-91	-9	6
Monaghan	7	3	0	4	6-83	7-91	-11	6
Cork	7	3	0	4	9-89	9-105	-16	6
Down	7	0	0	7	2-60	6-108	-60	0

^{1}Donegal, Mayo, Monaghan and Cork are ranked by scoring difference.

== Connacht Senior Football Championship ==
=== Fixtures ===
Date	Round	Team 1	Score	Team 2	Ground	References
Sunday 29 May 2016	Quarter Final	Mayo	2-16 v 0-09	London	Ruislip	
Sunday 20 June 2016	Semi Final	Mayo	0-12 v 1-12	Galway	McHale Park	

=== Bracket ===
Preliminary round
New York	0-17
Roscommon	1-15

Quarter-finals
Roscommon	1-21
Leitrim	0-11
London	0-9
Mayo	2-16

Semi-finals
Roscommon	4-16
Sligo	2-13
Mayo	0-12
Galway	1-12

Final
Roscommon (R)	1-10; 0-14
Galway (R)	0-13; 3-16

== 2016 All-Ireland Senior Football Championship ==
=== Fixtures ===
Date	Round	Team 1	Score	Team 2	Ground	References
Saturday 9 July 2016	Qualifiers R1	Mayo	2-14 – 1-12	Fermanagh	McHale Park	
Saturday 16 July 2016	Qualifiers R2	Mayo	2-17 – 0-14	Kildare	McHale Park	
Saturday 30 July 2016	Qualifiers R3	Mayo	3-15 – 1-14	Westmeath	Croke Park	
Saturday 6 August 2016	AI Quarter Final	Mayo	0-13 – 0-12	Tyrone	Croke Park	
Sunday 21 August 2016	AI Semi Final	Mayo	2-13 – 0-14	Tipperary	Croke Park	
Sunday 18 September 2016	AI Final	Mayo	0-15 – 2-09	Dublin	Croke Park	
Saturday 1 October 2016	AI Final Replay	Mayo	1-14 – 1-15	Dublin	Croke Park	
