= FBD 2024 =

Gaelic football competition in Connacht, Ireland

Tournament details
- Province: Connacht
- Year: 2024
- Sponsor: FBD
- Date: 5–19 January 2024
- Teams: 6
- Defending champions: Mayo

Winners
- Champions: Roscommon (6th win)
- Manager: Davy Burke
- Captain: Brian Stack

Runners-up
- Runners-up: Galway
- Manager: Pádraic Joyce
- Captain: Jack Kirrane

Other
- Matches played: 5

FBD 2024 is an inter-county Gaelic football competition in the province of Connacht, the successor to the FBD Insurance League. All games take place at the University of Galway Connacht GAA Airdome under the air-supported dome. London competed for the first time since the 2012 FBD, and secured their first ever win over Mayo. Roscommon were the winners, defeating Galway in the final.

== Competition format ==
The competition is a straight knockout; 4 teams compete in the quarter-finals while 2 teams receive a bye to the semi-finals. Drawn games go to a penalty shoot-out without the playing of extra-time.

== Fixtures ==
5 January 2024 Quarter-final	Sligo	0-15 (15) – (24) 1-21	Roscommon	Bekan
19:00 GMT (UTC±0)		(HT: 0-04 – 1-13)		Venue: Connacht GAA Centre of Excellence
		Report

7 January 2024 Quarter-final	Mayo	1-08 (11) – (12) 0-12	London	Bekan
13:00 IWT (UTC±0)		(HT: 0-06 – 0-05)		Venue: Connacht GAA Centre of Excellence
	Gls: C O’Connor 1 Pts: C O’Connor 2, J Flynn 2, D Quinn 1, F Irwin 1, D McHugh 1, C Dawson 1	Report	Pts: S Rafter 6, L Gallagher 2, E Walsh 1, O Kerr 1, A McLoughlin 1, DJ O’Flaherty 1	Referee: Dermot Lyons (Roscommon)

12 January 2024 Semi-final	Leitrim	1-17 (20) – (24) 2-18	Galway	Bekan
19:00 GMT (UTC±0)		(HT: 0-09 – 0-10)		Venue: Connacht GAA Centre of Excellence
		Report

13 January 2024 Semi-final	London	1-09 (12) – (21) 0-21	Roscommon	Bekan
19:00 GMT (UTC±0)		(HT: 1-06 – 0-13)		Venue: Connacht GAA Centre of Excellence

19 January 2024 Final	Galway	0-13 (13) – (31) 2-25	Roscommon	Bekan
19:30 GMT (UTC±0)		(HT: 0-06 – 1-14)		Venue: Connacht GAA Centre of Excellence
		Report
