= 2014 FBD Insurance League =

Tournament details
- Province: Connacht
- Year: 2014
- Sponsor: FBD

Winners
- Champions: Leitrim (2nd win)
- Manager: Seán Hagan
- Captain: Emlyn Mulligan

Runners-up
- Runners-up: Roscommon
- Manager: John Evans
- Captain: Niall Carty

The 2014 FBD Insurance League was an inter-county and colleges Gaelic football competition in the province of Connacht. As well as the five county teams, three colleges' teams competed: Institute of Technology, Sligo, NUI Galway and Galway-Mayo Institute of Technology (GMIT). Leitrim won for the second year in a row.

== Format ==
The teams are drawn into two groups of four teams. Each team plays the other teams in its group once, earning 2 points for a win and 1 for a draw. The two group winners play in the final.

== Results ==
=== Group A ===
Team	Pld	W	D	L	Pts	Diff
Roscommon	3	2	1	0	5	+13
IT Sligo	3	1	2	0	4	+8
Mayo	3	1	1	1	3	+1
NUI Galway	3	0	0	3	0	–22

- Roscommon 1-14 IT Sligo 1-14
- NUI Galway 1-6 Mayo 0-12
- Mayo 2-8 IT Sligo 1-11
- Roscommon 2-13 NUI Galway 1-5
- IT Sligo 1-13 NUI Galway 0-8
- Roscommon 1-10 Mayo 1-8

=== Group B ===
Team	Pld	W	D	L	Pts	Diff
Leitrim	3	2	1	0	5	+4
Galway	3	2	0	1	4	+17
Sligo	3	1	1	1	3	–8
GMIT	3	0	0	3	0	–13

- Galway 3-10 Sligo 0-8
- Leitrim 1-14 GMIT 1-11
- Sligo 1-8 GMIT 0-8
- Leitrim 1-10 Galway 2-6
- Galway 0-13 GMIT 0-6
- Leitrim 1-12 Sligo 2-9

=== Final ===
26 January 2014
Final

Leitrim	2-5 – 1-7	Roscommon
A Hickey and J Mulligan 1-0 each, W McKeon 0-2, E Mulligan (f), F Clancy and R Cox 0-1 each	Report	N Daly 1-1, D Murtagh 0-2, N Carty, C Daly, C Cregg (f) and C Murtagh 0-1 each

Páirc Seán Mac Diarmada, Carrick-on-Shannon
Referee: Michael Duffy (Sligo)
