= 2013 FBD Insurance League =

Gaelic football competition

Tournament details
- Sponsor: FBD

Winners
- Champions: Leitrim (1st win)
- Manager: Barney Breen
- Captain: Emlyn Mulligan

Runners-up
- Runners-up: Sligo
- Manager: Pat Flanagan

The 2013 FBD Insurance League was an inter-county and colleges Gaelic football competition in the province of Connacht. As well as the five county teams, three colleges' teams competed: Institute of Technology, Sligo, NUI Galway and Galway-Mayo Institute of Technology (GMIT). Leitrim won for the first time in the competition's history.

== Format ==
The teams are drawn into two groups of four teams. Each team plays the other teams in its group once, earning 2 points for a win and 1 for a draw. The two group winners play in the final. The winners were supposed to play a further game against New York, but this game was never played.

== Results ==
=== Section A ===
Team	Pld	W	D	L	Pts	Diff
Sligo	3	3	0	0	6	+13
Galway	3	2	0	1	4	+16
IT Sligo	3	1	0	2	2	–15
NUI Galway	3	0	0	3	0	–14

- Sligo 0-14 IT Sligo 0-5
- Galway 0-16 NUI Galway 0-6
- Galway 0-16 IT Sligo 1-5
- Sligo 0-14 NUI Galway 1-9
- Sligo 0-9 Galway 1-4
- IT Sligo 0-15 NUI Galway 0-13

=== Section B ===
Team	Pld	W	D	L	Pts	Diff
Leitrim	3	3	0	0	6	+3
Roscommon	3	1	1	1	3	+15
Mayo	3	1	1	1	3	+13
GMIT	3	0	0	3	0	–31

- Leitrim 0-6 Roscommon 0-5
- Mayo 2-14 GMIT 0-6
- Leitrim 0-9 Mayo 0-8
- Roscommon 1-20 GMIT 1-4
- Leitrim 0-10 GMIT 1-6
- Roscommon 1-7 Mayo 0-10

=== Final ===
27 January 2013
Final

Leitrim	0-8 – 0-5	Sligo
	Report

Markievicz Park, Sligo
