= 2017 FBD Insurance League =

Tournament details
- Province: Connacht
- Year: 2017
- Sponsor: FBD

Winners
- Champions: Galway (8th win)
- Manager: Kevin Walsh
- Captain: Gary O'Donnell

Runners-up
- Runners-up: Roscommon
- Manager: Kevin McStay
- Captain: Ciaráin Murtagh

Other
- Matches played: 12

The 2017 FBD Insurance League was an inter-county and third-level college gaelic football competition in the province of Connacht. All five Connacht county teams participated. Three college teams competed – Institute of Technology, Sligo, NUI Galway and Galway-Mayo Institute of Technology (GMIT). Galway were the winners. This was the last edition of the tournament to feature college teams.

== Format ==
The teams are drawn into two groups of four teams. Each team plays the other teams in its group once, earning 2 points for a win and 1 for a draw. The two group winners play in the final. Games are 30 minutes a side.

== Group stage ==
=== Group A ===
Team	Pld	W	D	L	Pts	Diff
Roscommon	3	2	0	1	4	+30
Mayo	3	2	0	1	4	+5
NUI Galway	3	2	0	1	4	–2
IT Sligo	3	0	0	3	0	–33

=== Group B ===
Team	Pld	W	D	L	Pts	Diff
Galway	3	3	0	0	6	+30
Sligo	3	2	0	1	4	+38
Leitrim	3	1	0	2	2	–2
GMIT	3	0	0	3	0	–60

- GMIT gave a walkover to Galway.

== Final ==
29 January 2017
2 p.m.

Roscommon	0-15 – 2-14	Galway
D Smith 0-7 (3f); C Murtagh 0-2; S McDermott, F Cregg, C Connolly, C Devaney, K Higgins 0-1 each	Report	B McHugh 0-6 (2f); C McDaid, D Cummins (0-1f) 1-1 each; J Heaney 0-3; G O’Donnell 0-2; T Flynn 0-1

Newpark, Kiltoom
Referee: L Devenney (Mayo)
