= 2016 FBD Insurance League =

Tournament details
- Province: Connacht
- Year: 2016
- Sponsor: FBD

Winners
- Champions: Galway (7th win)
- Manager: Kevin Walsh
- Captain: Adrian Varley

Runners-up
- Runners-up: Roscommon
- Manager: Kevin McStay & Fergal O'Donnell
- Captain: Niall Daly

The 2016 FBD Insurance League was an inter-county and colleges Gaelic football competition in the province of Connacht. As well as the five county teams, three colleges' teams competed: Institute of Technology, Sligo, NUI Galway and Galway-Mayo Institute of Technology (GMIT). Galway won.

== Format ==
The teams are drawn into two groups of four teams. Each team plays the other teams in its group once, earning 2 points for a win and 1 for a draw. The two group winners play in the final.

== Results ==
=== Section A ===
Team	Pld	W	D	L	Pts	Diff
Roscommon	3	3	0	0	6	+20
Mayo	3	2	0	1	4	+10
NUI Galway	3	1	0	2	2	+10
IT Sligo	3	0	0	3	0	–40

=== Section B ===
Team	Pld	W	D	L	Pts	Diff
Galway	3	3	0	0	6	+14
Leitrim	3	2	0	1	4	+18
GMIT	3	1	0	2	2	–23
Sligo	3	0	0	3	0	–9

=== Final ===
24 January 2016
Final

Roscommon	0-13 – 2-8	Galway
	Report

Pearse Stadium
