= 2015 FBD Insurance League =

Tournament details
- Province: Connacht
- Year: 2015
- Sponsor: FBD

Winners
- Champions: Roscommon (3rd win)
- Manager: John Evans
- Captain: Niall Carty

Runners-up
- Runners-up: Galway
- Manager: Kevin Walsh

The 2015 FBD Insurance League was an inter-county and colleges Gaelic football competition in the province of Connacht. As well as the five county teams, three colleges' teams competed: Institute of Technology, Sligo, NUI Galway and Galway-Mayo Institute of Technology (GMIT). Roscommon won.

== Format ==
The teams are drawn into two groups of four teams. Each team plays the other teams in its group once, earning 2 points for a win and 1 for a draw. The two group winners play in the final.

== Results ==
=== Group A ===
Team	Pld	W	D	L	Pts	Diff
Roscommon	3	2	0	1	4	+13
Mayo	3	2	0	1	4	+6
NUI Galway	3	1	1	1	3	–1
IT Sligo	3	0	1	2	1	–18

Roscommon are placed ahead of Mayo as they won the head-to-head game between the teams.

- Mayo 1-13 NUIG 1-11
- Roscommon 0-14 IT Sligo 0-5
- Roscommon 0-9 NUIG 0-10
- Mayo 0-15 IT Sligo 0-6
- Mayo 1-10 Roscommon 2-12
- NUIG 0-8 IT Sligo 0-8

=== Group B ===
Team	Pld	W	D	L	Pts	Diff
Galway	3	3	0	0	6	+21
Sligo	3	2	0	1	4	+1
Leitrim	3	1	0	2	2	+13
GMIT	3	0	0	3	0	–35

- Sligo 0-5 Galway 0-14
- Leitrim 3-17 GMIT 1-7
- Leitrim 1-9 Galway 0-13
- Sligo 1-13 GMIT 0-8
- Galway 1-13 GMIT 0-5
- Leitrim 1-10 Sligo 2-9

=== Final ===
25 January 2015
Final

Roscommon	4-8 – 0-12	Galway
	Report

Kiltoom
Referee: John Gilmartin (Sligo)
