= Gay Sheerin =

Roscommon Gaelic football goalkeeper

Gay Sheerin (born 1955/1956) is a former Gaelic footballer and manager. He played as a goalkeeper for St Ronan's GAA club and at senior level for the Roscommon county team.

== Career ==
Sheerin played half-back as an under-16 player until he was assigned to be goalkeeper. His club, St Ronan's, kept him there. Afterwards, he was called into the county minor team, and there he was assigned permanently as a goalkeeper. A year later, he was assigned to be an outfielder with them, before resuming his former position of goalkeeper at inter-county level.

Sheerin got into the senior inter-county team in the spring of 1977 for the National League. Roscommon won the Connacht Senior Football Championship (SFC) in 1977. By then, Sheerin was replaced with first choice goalkeeper Gerry O'Dowd. Sheerin earned the Number One Jersey by 1978, and he received his first of five Connacht SFC medals that same year. Afterwards, Roscommon faced off against Kerry, but did not reach a favorable conclusion.Sheerin was dropped from the county team in 1979, and replaced with John McDermott of Roscommon Gaels.Afterwards, in May 1980, a challenge match against Cavan was held to open the Cloone pitch. After this, Sheerin resumed his former position again, and was a goalkeeper for the 1980 All-Ireland Senior Football Championship Final.

He returned in 1985 after a leave to build his house. In 1985, 1988, and 1989, Roscommon lost three Connacht SFC finals to Mayo, each in Dr Hyde Park. Sheerin rated the 1986 Connacht final loss to the Galway as the worst. In the early 1990s, Roscommon won two consecutive Connacht titles, defeating Galway in 1990 and Mayo in 1991 with the help of a replay. Cork and Meath both defeated them in the All-Ireland SFC semi-finals of those years.

== Manager ==
In 1997 Sheerin managed Roscommon. He was appointed before the league opened. Under his management, Roscommon advanced to a Connacht final in 2001 that they lost to ultimate champion Galway. Galway won the 2001 All-Ireland Senior Football Championship title. Sheerin later quit the job in 2000 after three seasons due to Leitrim defeating Roscommon in the Connacht SFC semi-final. He was later assigned as a selector for Roscommon. In February 2017, he disagreed with the Roscommon manager at the time, Kevin McStay, over allowing players from the Mayo county football team to join Roscommon. Roscommon later won the 2017 Connacht Senior Football Championship.

== Personal life ==
In August 1978, Sheerin had barely started an apprenticeship before returning to football. He left the inter-county game in 1983 to build his house. His trade was plastering, but he also worked as a Lakeland Dairies sales representative.

Sheerin's inspirations include Brian McAlinden of Armagh, Paddy Linden Monaghan, and Martin Furlong of Offaly. He is married with two children.
