= 2019 FBD Insurance League =

Tournament details
- Province: Connacht
- Year: 2019
- Sponsor: FBD

Winners
- Champions: Roscommon (5th win)
- Manager: Anthony Cunningham
- Captain: Enda Smith

Runners-up
- Runners-up: Galway
- Manager: Kevin Walsh
- Captain: Shane Walsh

Other
- Matches played: 4

The 2019 FBD Insurance League (sometimes referred to as the Connacht SFL) was an inter-county Gaelic football competition in the province of Connacht. All five Connacht county teams participated, but there are no college or university teams.

After the 2018 tournament featured a busy schedule with several postponements due to bad weather, the 2019 tournament was a straight knockout with teams playing just one or two games (as opposed to 4 games in the previous year).

The competition featured an historic penalty shootout in which Mayo defeated Leitrim by 4-1 to advance to the semi-final after the teams could not be separated following seventy minutes of play.

== Competition format ==
The competition was a straight knockout. Drawn games went a penalty shoot-out without the playing of extra-time. This occurred in Mayo v Leitrim.

== Fixtures and results ==
6 January 2019 Quarter-final	Leitrim	2-13 (19) – (19) 2-13 (1–4 pen)	Mayo	Carrick-on-Shannon
13:30 GMT (UTC±0)		(HT: 0-8 – 2-9)		Venue: Páirc Seán Mac Diarmada
		Report		Referee: James Molloy (Galway)
		Penalty shootout
	Ryan O'Rourke; Mark Plunkett ✗ Domhnaill Flynn ✗		Jason Doherty; Brian Reape; Fergal Boland; Evan Regan

13 January 2019 Semi-final	Galway	1-09 (12) – (12) 1-09 (4–2 pen)	Mayo	Tuam
13:30 GMT (UTC±0)		(HT: 0-03 – 1-05)		Venue: St Jarlath's Park
		Report		Referee: Patrick Neilan (Roscommon)
		Penalty shootout
	Liam Silke; Johnny Heaney; Barry McHugh; Tom Flynn		✗ Diarmuid O'Connor; Brian Reape; James Kelly; ✗ Andy Moran

13 January 2019 Semi-final	Roscommon	2-18 (24) – (19) 1-16	Sligo	Roscommon
13:30 GMT (UTC±0)		(HT: 1-06 – 1-10)		Venue: Dr. Hyde Park
		Report		Referee: J Henry (Mayo)

20 January 2019
13:30 GMT (UTC±0)
Final

Report

Galway	1-05 (08) – (13) 0-13	Roscommon
(HT: 0-04 – 0-06)
Gls: B McHugh 1 Pts: G O’Donnell 2, S Walsh 2 (1f), B McHugh 1(f)		Pts: D Smith 8 (5f), C Lennon 2, S Killoran 1, U Harney 1, C Compton 1

St Jarlath's Park, Tuam
Referee: Liam Devenney (Mayo)
