= 2020 FBD Insurance Connacht GAA Senior Football Competition =

Gaelic football competition in Connacht, Ireland

Tournament details
- Province: Connacht
- Year: 2020
- Sponsor: FBD

Winners
- Champions: Galway (9th win)
- Manager: Pádraic Joyce
- Captain: Shane Walsh

Runners-up
- Runners-up: Roscommon
- Manager: Anthony Cunningham
- Captain: Conor Devaney

Other
- Matches played: 4

The 2020 FBD Insurance Connacht GAA Senior Football Competition was an inter-county Gaelic football competition in the province of Connacht. All five Connacht county teams participated, but there are no college or university teams.

Galway were the winners.

== Competition format ==
The competition is a straight knockout. Drawn games go to a penalty shoot-out without the playing of extra-time.

== Fixtures and results ==
5 January 2020 Quarter-final	Sligo	0-14 (14) – (18) 1-15	Roscommon	Sligo
14:00 GMT (UTC±0)		(HT: 0-04 – 0-09)		Venue: Markievicz Park
		Report		Referee: Jerome Henry (Mayo)

12 January 2020 Semi-final	Roscommon	7-16 (37) – (7) 0-07	Leitrim	Carrick-on-Shannon
14:00 GMT (UTC±0)		(HT: 4-07 – 0-01)		Venue: Páirc Seán Mac Diarmada
		Report

12 January 2020 Semi-final	Mayo	1-17 (20) – (20) 1-17 (2–3 pen)	Galway	Castlebar
14:00 GMT (UTC±0)		(HT: 0-09 – 0-08)		Venue: MacHale Park
		Report		Referee: P Guckian (Leitrim); Attendance: 7,000
		Penalty shootout
	Fergal Boland ✗ Liam Irwin; Kevin McLoughlin; Gary Boylan ✗ Brian Walsh ✗		Shane Walsh; ✗ Paul Conroy; Damien Comer; ✗ Adrian Varley; Tom Flynn

18 January 2020 Final	Roscommon	0-11 (11) – (17) 1-14	Galway	Roscommon
14:00 GMT (UTC±0)		(HT: 0-05 – 0-07)		Venue: Dr. Hyde Park
	Pts: Ciarán Lennon 5 (3f), Donie Smith 2 (1f), Niall Kilroy 1, Richard Hughes 1, Andrew Glennon 1, Cathal Cregg 1	Report	Gls: Shane Walsh 1 (pen); Pts: Shane Walsh 8 (6f, 1 mark), Paul Conroy 2, Robert Finnerty 2, Michael Boyle 1, Seán Mulkerrin 1	Referee: Jerome Henry (Mayo); Attendance: 3,217
