= 2026 FBD League =

Gaelic football competition

Tournament details
- Province: Connacht
- Year: 2026
- Sponsor: FBD
- Date: 3–18 January 2026
- Teams: 6
- Defending champions: Galway

Winners
- Champions: Galway (11th win)
- Manager: Pádraic Joyce
- Captain: Kieran Molloy

Runners-up
- Runners-up: Mayo
- Manager: Andy Moran
- Captain: Jack Coyne

Other
- Matches played: 9

The 2026 FBD League is a Gaelic football competition for county teams in the province of Connacht.

The draw was announced in October 2025, with the competition commencing 3 January. Galway won.

== Format ==
A league format will return for the first time since 2018. Six teams enter, and each plays two games against other teams (Sligo–Mayo, Galway–London, Roscommon–Leitrim, Leitrim–Galway, London–Sligo, Mayo–Roscommon), each team playing one home game and one away, and earning two points for a win and one for a draw. The top two teams go into the FBD League final; third and fourth place play in a Shield final, and fifth and sixth play a Plate final.

== Results ==
Pos	Team	Pld	W	D	L	PF	PA	PD	Pts	Qualification
1	Galway (L)	2	2	0	0	53	18	+35	4	Advance to FBD League Final
2	Mayo	2	2	0	0	42	23	+19	4	Advance to FBD League Final
3	Roscommon	2	1	0	1	41	36	+5	2	Advance to Shield Final
4	Sligo (S)	2	0	1	1	28	34	−6	1	Advance to Shield Final
5	London (P)	2	0	1	1	18	42	−24	1	Advance to Plate Final
6	Leitrim	2	0	0	2	28	57	−29	0	Advance to Plate Final

Source: GalwayGAA.ie
(L) FBD League winners; (P) FBD Plate winners; (S) FBD Shield winners

=== Final ===
Spórt TG4 YouTube

18 January 2026
13:00 IWT (UTC+0)
FBD League Final

Report

Galway	2-12 (18) – (17) 1-14	Mayo
(HT: 2-05 – 0-04)

St Jarlath's Park, Tuam
Referee: D Lyons (Roscommon)
