= FBD 2023 =

Gaelic football competition in Connacht, Ireland

Tournament details
- Province: Connacht
- Year: 2023
- Sponsor: FBD
- Date: 6–20 January 2023
- Teams: 5
- Defending champions: Galway

Winners
- Champions: Mayo (8th win)
- Manager: Kevin McStay
- Captain: Stephen Coen

Runners-up
- Runners-up: Roscommon
- Manager: Davy Burke
- Captain: Diarmuid Murtagh

Other
- Matches played: 4

FBD 2023 was an inter-county Gaelic football competition in the province of Connacht, the successor to the FBD Insurance League. All five Connacht county teams participated. All games took place at the University of Galway Connacht GAA Airdome under the air-supported dome for the second year in a row. Mayo were the winners, for the first time since 2012.

== Competition format ==
The competition is a straight knockout. Drawn games go to extra-time and possible penalty shoot-out.

== Results ==
6 January 2023 Quarter-final	Leitrim	1-13 (16) – (30) 3-21	Galway	Bekan
19:00 IWT (UTC±0)		(HT: 0-05 – 2-12)		Venue: Connacht GAA Centre of Excellence
		Report		Referee: A Clogher (Roscommon); Attendance: 1,200

13 January 2023 Semi-final	Sligo	2-13 (19) – (26) 3-17	Roscommon	Bekan
19:00 IWT (UTC±0)		(HT: 2-09 – 1-09)		Venue: Connacht GAA Centre of Excellence
		Report

14 January 2023 Semi-final	Mayo	2-18 (24) – (21) 3-12	Galway	Bekan
17:30 IWT (UTC±0)		(HT: 2-09 – 0-05)		Venue: Connacht GAA Centre of Excellence
		Report		Referee: B Judge (Sligo)

20 January 2023 Final	Roscommon	0-09 (9) – (13) 0-13	Mayo	Bekan
19:30 IWT (UTC±0)		(HT: 0-02 – 0-05)		Venue: Connacht GAA Centre of Excellence
		Report
