= Seamus Hayden =

Irish Gaelic footballer

Seamus Hayden is an Irish former Gaelic footballer who played for the Roscommon county team. He was Dermot Earley Snr's regular companion in midfield. Though there was a nine-year age difference between them, the pair played together for eight years, from the 1978–79 National Football League until Earley's 1985 retirement.

Hayden was the captain when Roscommon won the 1978 All-Ireland Under-21 Football Championship final. With the senior team, he won four Connacht Senior Football Championship titles in 1977, 1978, 1979 and 1980, as well as the National Football League, before playing in the 1980 All-Ireland Senior Football Championship final. This followed the All-Ireland SFC semi-final against Armagh, when Hayden had lasted eight minutes before going off with an injured leg.

Later, when Dermot Earley managed Roscommon, he asked Hayden to be one of his selectors. Ahead of the 2019 Irish local elections, Fine Gael showed interest in having him as a candidate in the Roscommon County Council election. Hayden is a publican in Roscommon.
