= 1994 Connacht Senior Football Championship =

Gaelic football competition

Tournament details
- Trophy: J. J. Nester Cup
- Teams: 6

Winners
- Champions: Leitrim (2nd win)
- Qualify for: All-Ireland SFC

The 1994 Connacht Senior Football Championship was the installment of the annual Connacht Senior Football Championship held under the auspices of Connacht GAA.

The winning team qualified for the 1994 All-Ireland Senior Football Championship.

Leitrim won their second title and their first since 1927.

== Teams ==
The Connacht championship is contested by the five counties in the Irish province of Connacht and London.

Team	Colours	Sponsor	Manager	Captain	Most recent success
Team	Colours	Sponsor	Manager	Captain	All-Ireland	Provincial
Galway	Maroon and white	Tommy Varden Catering	Bosco McDermott		1966	1987
Leitrim	Green and gold		John O'Mahony	Declan Darcy		1927
London	Green and white
Mayo	Green and red	Genefit	Jack O'Shea	[[]]	1951	1993
Roscommon	Primrose and royal blue		Donie Shine		1944	1991
Sligo	Black and white		P. J. Carroll			1975

== Results ==
Quarter-finals

5 June 1994 Quarter-final	Roscommon	0-12 – 1-10	Leitrim	Dr. Hyde Park, Roscommon
	D Duggan 0-6, D Connellan 0-3,		A Rooney 0-5, G Dugdale 1-0, J Ward 0-2, L Conlon 0-2, D Darcy 0-1.	Attendance: 11,408; Referee: B White (Wexford)

5 June 1994 Quarter-final	London	0-6 – 2-21	Galway	Emerald GAA Grounds, Ruislip
	N Harrington 0-2, V Dowd 0-1, E Prenter 0-1, J Landy 0-1, O Murphy 0-1.		F O'Neill 1-9, S Conlon 1-0, M Donnellan 0-2, Ja Fallon 0-2, K Walsh 0-2, V Daly 0-2, A Mac Carthaigh 0-1, N Finnegan 0-1, F Gavin 0-1, S Óg de Paor 0-1.	Attendance: 800

Semi-finals

26 June 1994 Semi-final	Mayo	2-18 – 1-5	Sligo	McHale Park, Castlebar
	K O'Neill 1-7, L McHale 1-1, K lydon 0-3, R Goulding 0-3, K McDonnell 0-1, P Butler 0-1, P Fallon 0-1, K Staunton 0-1.		M McGrath 1-3, T Deignan 0-1, F Feeney 0-1.	Attendance: 6,291; Referee: M Curley (Galway)

3 July 1994 Semi-final	Leitrim	0-9 – 1-6	Galway	Páirc Sheáin Mhic Dhiarmada, Carrick-on-Shannon
	G Dugdale 0-3, A Rooney 0-2, P Kieran 0-2, D Darcy 0-1, P Donoghue 0-1.		C McGauran 1-1, F O'Neill 0-2, Ja Fallon 0-2, M Donnellan 0-1.	Attendance: 10,042; Referee: S McHale (Mayo)

10 July 1994 Semi-final replay	Galway	0-10 – 0-11	Leitrim	Tuam Stadium, Tuam
	S Walsh 0-3, K Walsh 0-2, F O'Neill 0-2, Ja Fallon 0-1, V Daly 0-1.		C McGlynn 0-2, P Kenny 0-2, A Rooney 0-2, B Breen 0-2, D Darcy 0-1, G Dugdale 0-1, P Kieran 0-1.	Attendance: 7,074; Referee: S McHale (Mayo)

Final

24 July 1994 Final	Leitrim	0-12 – 2-4	Mayo	Dr. Hyde Park, Roscommon
	A Rooney 0-4, L Conlon 0-2, D Darcy 0-2, M Quinn 0-2, P Kenny 0-1, P Kieran 0-1.	Report	K Staunton 1-0, P Fallon 1-0, Golding 0-2, K McDonnell 0-1, K O'Neill 0-1.	Attendance: 18,271; Referee: M Curley (Galway)
