= 2011 FBD Insurance League =

2011 FBD Insurance Leaguea
Tournament details
- Sponsor: FBD

Winners
- Champions: Mayo (6th win)
- Manager: James Horan
- Captain: Alan Dillon

Runners-up
- Runners-up: New York

The 2011 FBD Insurance League was an inter-county and colleges Gaelic football competition in the province of Connacht. As well as the five county teams, three colleges' teams competed: Institute of Technology, Sligo, NUI Galway and Galway-Mayo Institute of Technology (GMIT). Mayo won.

== Format ==
The teams are drawn into two groups of 4 teams. Each team plays the other teams in its group once, earning 2 points for a win and 1 for a draw. The two group winners play in the final. The winners play a further game against New York.

== Results ==
=== Finals ===
11 February 2011
Home Final

Mayo	1-14 – 0-11	NUI Galway
	Report

Markievicz Park, Sligo
Referee: O. Kelly (Roscommon)
9 October 2011
Final

Mayo	7-12 – 2-8	New York
	Report	Kelly (0-2), Hatzer (0-2), McGourty (0-2), Walsh (0-2), A. O’Connor (1-0), Fitzgerald (1-0)

Gaelic Park, New York City
