= 1927 Connacht Senior Football Championship =

Gaelic football competition

Tournament details
- Trophy: J. J. Nester Cup
- Teams: 5

Winners
- Champions: Leitrim (1st win)
- Qualify for: All-Ireland SFC

The 1927 Connacht Senior Football Championship the installment of the annual Connacht Senior Football Championship held under the auspices of Connacht GAA.

The winning team qualified for the 1927 All-Ireland Senior Football Championship.

Leitrim won their first title and their last until 1994.

== Teams ==
The Connacht championship is contested by the five counties in the Irish province of Connacht.

Team	Colours	Sponsor	Manager	Captain	Most recent success
Team	Colours	Sponsor	Manager	Captain	All-Ireland	Provincial
Galway	Maroon and white				1925	1926
Leitrim	Green and gold
Mayo	Green and red			[[]]		1924
Roscommon	Primrose and royal blue		[[]]			1914
Sligo	Black and white

== Results ==
29 May 1927
Quarter-Final

Sligo	1-8 – 2-3	Mayo

Castlerea

An objection was made and a replay ordered.

19 June 1927
Quarter-Final Replay

Sligo	0-0 – 1-0	Mayo

Sligo

[Match abandoned following a disputed goal for Mayo after 12 minutes. Sligo withdrew from the championship and Mayo were awarded the tie.]

22 May 1927
Semi-Final

Leitrim	1-3 – 0-2	Roscommon

Carrick-on-Shannon

An objection was made and a replay ordered.

26 June 1927
Semi-Final Replay

Leitrim	0-7 – 1-0	Roscommon

Ballinamore

17 July 1927
Semi-Final

Mayo	1-4 – 1-5	Galway
JE McEllin (1-0).

Tuam

7 August 1927
Final

Leitrim	2-4 – 0-3	Galway

Roscommon
