= Pat Lindsay =

Irish Gaelic footballer and manager

Personal information
- Native name: Pádraig Ó Loingsigh (Irish)
- Nickname: The mayor
- Born: 1950 (age 75–76) Belmullet, County Mayo, Ireland
- Occupation: Retired prison officer
- Height: 6 ft 0 in (183 cm)

Sport
- Sport: Gaelic football
- Position: Full-back
Clubs
- Years: Club
- St Faithleach's; Glencar; Shannon Gaels
Inter-county
- Years: County
- 1970–1985: Roscommon
Inter-county titles
- Connacht titles: 5
- All-Irelands: 0
- NFL: 1
- All Stars: 1

Patrick J. Lindsay (born 1950) is an Irish former Gaelic footballer who played for club sides St Faithleach's, Glencar and Shannon Gaels and at inter-county level with the Roscommon senior football team.

== Playing career ==
Lindsay first played Gaelic football at juvenile and underage levels with the St Faithleach's club. He subsequently progressed to adult level. Lindsay also lined out with the Glencar club in County Leitrim and the Shannon Gaels club in County Cavan.

Lindsay first appeared on the inter-county scene for Roscommon as a member of the minor team. His three-year tenure yielded a Connacht MFC title in 1967. He later spent two unsuccessful years with the under-21 team. Lindsay was still eligible for the under-21 grade when he joined the senior team in 1970. He was a mainstay of the team for the following 15 years, during which time he won five Connacht SFC medals, including a four-in-a-row from 1977 to 1980. Lindsay captained the team to the National League title in 1979 and was at full-back when Roscommon were beaten by Kerry in the 1980 All-Ireland final. His performances also earned inclusion on the Connacht team for the Railway Cup, while he was also named on the All-Star team in 1977.

== Managerial career ==
In retirement from playing, Lindsay became involved in team management and coaching. He was trainer of the Roscommon under-21 team from 1991 to 1993; however, he enjoyed little success during his tenure.

== Honours ==
Roscommon

- Connacht Senior Football Championship: 1972, 1977, 1978, 1979, 1980
- National Football League: 1978–79 (c)
- Connacht Minor Football Championship: 1967
