= Tom Donnellan =

Irish Gaelic footballer

Tom Donnellan is an Irish former Gaelic footballer who played for Roscommon Gaels and the Roscommon county team.

Donnellan's inter-county career coincided with a successful period for Roscommon from the end of the 1970s to the beginning of the 1980s. With Roscommon he won four Connacht Senior Football Championship titles in 1977, 1978, 1979 and 1980. He played in the 1980 All-Ireland Senior Football Championship final, after winning a National Football League title in 1979. His playing position was a defensive one, for example, he played at centre half-back against Cork in the 1979 league final.

Donnellan trained as a teacher in Strawberry Hill. Since his retirement he has become interested in pétanque.
