= Kevin McStay =

Irish Gaelic footballer, manager and television commentator

Personal information
- Born: 5 April 1962 (age 64) Castlebar, County Mayo, Ireland
- Occupation: Army officer
- Height: 5 ft 10 in (178 cm)

Sport
- Sport: Gaelic football
- Position: Left corner-forward
Clubs
- Years: Club
- Ballina Stephenites; Ballymun Kickhams; Roscommon Gaels
Inter-county
Years	County	Apps (scores)
1983–1990	Mayo	17 (1-46)
Inter-county titles
- Connacht titles: 2
- All-Irelands: 0
- NFL: 0
- All Stars: 1

Kevin McStay (born 9 May 1962) is an Irish Gaelic football manager, commentator, analyst and former player.

Educated at St Jarlath's College in Tuam during the 1970s, McStay played for the school team. In retirement from playing, McStay became an analyst and co-commentator with The Sunday Game; however, he remained involved as a manager and coach. He was manager of Roscommon between 2015 and 2018 and of his native Mayo county team between 2022 and 2025.

== Early and personal life ==
Born in Castlebar, County Mayo, McStay was introduced to the game by his father, a former player with Tuam Stars. His brother, Paul, and his brother-in-law, Liam McHale, also played with Mayo.

== Army career ==
McStay was an officer in the Irish Army from 1982 to 2013. He reached the rank of lieutenant colonel. He served in Lebanon twice as part of the UN's peacekeeping forces and had a NATO-led stint in Kosovo.

== Playing career ==
=== Club ===
McStay played some Gaelic football at schools level with St Muredach's College and St Jarlath's College. He also played at under-age levels with the Ballina Stephenites club.

A two-time championship medal winner with the Ballina Stephenites senior club, he later won a championship medal with Roscommon Gaels.

McStay also lined out for Ballymun Kickhams.

=== Inter-county ===
McStay made his debut on the inter-county scene at the age of 16 when he was selected to play with the Mayo minor team. A two-time Connacht medal winner in this grade, he later won one All-Ireland Under-21 medal. McStay made his senior debut during the 1983 championship. He went on to play a key role for Mayo in attack during an era in which they won two Connacht medals. McStay was an All-Ireland runner-up on one occasion.

Throughout his inter-county career, he made 56 appearances and scored a total of 7–122. 17 of these appearances were in the championship. McStay retired from inter-county football after breaking his leg while playing against Castlebar one week after Mayo's exit from the 1990 championship.

McStay won an All Star as an inside forward in 1985.

=== Inter-provincial ===
As a member of the Connacht inter-provincial team on a number of occasions, McStay never won a Railway Cup medal.

== Media career ==
McStay went on to become an analyst with The Sunday Game.

== Coaching and managerial career ==
=== Early roles as coach ===
However, he remained involved as a manager and coach. At inter-county level he led the Roscommon minor team before guiding the Mayo under-21 team to a Connacht title in 2001. As a club manager he steered Roscommon Gaels to championship success in 2004, before guiding St Brigid's to the All-Ireland title in 2013.

=== Roscommon senior team ===
McStay was appointed joint-manager of the Roscommon senior team on 5 October 2015 along with Fergal O'Donnell, and took over as sole manager in October 2016. He led the Roscommon team that won the 2017 Connacht Senior Football Championship, beating Galway 2–15 to 0-12, in Pearse Stadium, Salthill.

McStay got himself into bother while his team were playing Donegal in the 2018 Championship, involving himself in a number of different incidents with match officials, shoving a linesman in a chest and hurling a football at full force in the direction of another. A lengthy ban resulted. However, he resigned as Roscommon manager before the ban was completed. Announcing his departure on 5 September 2018, he stated that he could bring the team no further. At this time, a vacancy had arisen in his native county following the earlier resignation as Mayo senior manager of Stephen Rochford, and McStay was linked with the job; however, McStay announced, on 5 September 2018, that "today marks my retirement from senior inter-county football management".

=== Mayo senior team ===
He applied for the Mayo managerial vacancy in 2014 but was surprised when Pat Holmes and Noel Connelly became joint managers ahead of the 2015 season. McStay spoke about the experience in April 2021: "The interview I did, perhaps, I might have been too honest at it. When I say the interview, it wasn't really an interview because I had the job, because I was the only candidate. Yet, 24 hours after that interview, one or two friends of mine in Mayo were able to tell me 'you are not going to get the that job'. That there are other people who are in the race but not saying it. That was very disappointing for me. People I knew, that I had had played with, was on panels with, were saying publicly that they had no interest in the job and were actually talking about the position while I thought in my head that I was actually crossing Ts and dotting Is. I have a sense that perhaps at the meeting I said too much in terms of what my vision for the team was. That there might have to be some changes, and that was leaked to certain players. I would say that that was an issue. It was a very difficult time for me personally. I had put all my hopes and dreams on [that job]".

McStay was appointed manager of the Mayo senior team on 22 August 2022.

In 2025, under the management of McStay, Mayo lost to Cavan in a championship game for the first time since the 1948 All-Ireland SFC final. Less than a week later, McStay became ill during training at MacHale Park. On 26 May, McStay stepped back from managing Mayo to deal with his health problems and former manager Stephen Rochford took his place. Rochford was interim manager for two games, as Mayo made an early championship exit.

The Mayo County Board then decided to "relieve Kevin McStay and his management team from their roles" with the team, although their four-year term was not complete.

== Comments on Mayo ==
In 2002, McStay commented on Mayo's lack of clinical finishing and tendency to amass high wide tallies in games: "We are not clever up front, we haven't been for 30 years and I would include my own vintage. I wouldn't say we have had a forward line that would frighten you since the '60s."

== Career statistics ==
=== Manager ===
As of match played 14 September 2022.

Team	From	To	FBD League				League				Connacht				All-Ireland				Total				
Team	From	To	G	W	D	L	G	W	D	L	G	W	D	L	G	W	D	L	G	W	D	L	Win %
Roscommon	5 October 2015	5 September 2018	4	3	0	1	8	4	0	4	1	1	0	0	0	0	0	0	13	8	0	5	61.5
Mayo	September 2022	June 2025	0	0	0	0	3	1	2	0	0	0	0	0	0	0	0	0	0	0	0	0	-

== Honours ==
=== Manager ===
Roscommon

- Connacht Senior Football Championship: 2017; runner-up: 2016 (with Fergal O'Donnell), 2018
- FBD League: 2018

runner-up: 2016 (with Fergal O'Donnell), 2017

Mayo

- FBD League: 2023
- NFL: 2023

=== Individual ===
In 2010, Sean Rice of The Mayo News named McStay on his "Best Mayo Team Since 1960".

Sporting positions
Preceded by John Evans	Roscommon Senior Football Manager; 2015–2018	Succeeded by Anthony Cunningham
Preceded by James Horan	Mayo Senior Football Manager; 2022–2025	Succeeded by Andy Moran
Achievements
Preceded by Tony McEntee (Crossmaglen Rangers)	All-Ireland Club SFC winning manager 2013	Succeeded by Tommy Conroy (St Vincent's)
