= 1927 All-Ireland Senior Football Championship =

Football championship

All-Ireland Champions
- Winning team: Kildare (3rd win)
- Captain: Mick Buckley

All-Ireland Finalists
- Losing team: Kerry
- Captain: John Joe Sheehy

Provincial Champions
- Munster: Kerry
- Leinster: Kildare
- Ulster: Monaghan
- Connacht: Leitrim

Championship statistics

The 1927 All-Ireland Senior Football Championship was the 41st staging of Ireland's premier Gaelic football knock-out competition. Kildare were the winners, bringing an end to Kerry's year.

== Results ==
=== Connacht ===
1927 Connacht Senior Football Championship

29 May 1927
Quarter-Final

Sligo	1–8 – 2–3	Mayo

Castlerea

An objection was made and a replay ordered.

19 June 1927
Quarter-Final Replay

Sligo	0–0 – 1–0	Mayo

Sligo

[Match abandoned following a disputed goal for Mayo after 12 minutes. Sligo withdrew from the championship and Mayo were awarded the tie.]

22 May 1927
Semi-Final

Leitrim	1–3 – 0–2	Roscommon

Carrick-on-Shannon

An objection was made and a replay ordered.

26 June 1927
Semi-Final Replay

Leitrim	0–7 – 1–0	Roscommon

Ballinamore

17 July 1927
Semi-Final

Mayo	1–4 – 1–5	Galway
JE McEllin (1–0).

Tuam

7 August 1927
Final

Leitrim	2–4 – 0–3	Galway

Roscommon

=== Leinster ===
Leinster Senior Football Championship

22 May 1927
Quarter-Final

Meath	2–7 – 0–0	Louth

Navan

22 May 1927
Quarter-Final

Kildare	1–4 – 0–2	Kilkenny

O'Moore Park, Portlaoise

29 May 1927
Quarter-Final

Wexford	7–10 – 6–2	Longford

Croke Park, Dublin

19 June 1927
Quarter-Final

Dublin	2–5 – 0–3	Laois

Geraldine Park, Athy

1927
Semi-Final

Dublin	0–11 – 2–5	Wexford

Nowlan Park, Kilkenny

1927
Semi-Final Replay

Dublin	0–8 – 1–1	Wexford

Nowlan Park, Kilkenny

17 July 1927
Semi-Final

Kildare	1–6 – 1–2	Meath

Drogheda Park, Drogheda

14 August 1927
Final

Kildare	0–5 – 0–3	Dublin
Paul Doyle 0–4 and Jack Higgins 0-1f		Paul Russell 0–2 and Paddy McDonnell 0–1

Croke Park, Dublin
Referee: Tom Burke (Louth)

=== Munster ===
Munster Senior Football Championship

8 May 1927
Quarter-Final

Kerry	1-7– 0–1	Cork
John Joe Sheehy (0–1), Tom O'Mahony (0–3) & James Baily (1–2).

Cork Athletic Grounds, Cork

12 June 1927
Quarter-Final

Tipperary	4-3– 0–4	Limerick

Clonmel
Referee: R. Stapleton ( T )

15 May 1927
Semi-Final

Clare	2-6– 1–1	Waterford

Ennis

14 August 1927
Semi-Final

Kerry	2–6 – 1–1	Tipperary
Jackie Ryan (0–2), Paddy Whitty (1–0), Denis Rory O'Connell (1–0), Tom O'Mahony (0–3) & Ned Sweeney (0–1).

Fraher Field, Dungarvan
Referee: A. Beckett ( C )

11 September 1927
Final

Kerry	4–4 – 1–3	Clare
Bob Stack (0–1), Denis Rory O'Connell (1–0), John Joe Sheehy (1–1), Tom O'Mahony (1–1) & Ned Sweeney (1–0).

The Cricket Field, Kilrush

=== Ulster ===
Ulster Senior Football Championship

22 May 1927
Quarter-Final

Cavan	7–7 – 4–3	Derry

Belfast

22 May 1927
Quarter-Final

Armagh	1–5 – 0–4	Donegal

Athletic Grounds, Armagh

22 May 1927
Quarter-Final

Antrim	1–9 – 0–11	Tyrone

Belfast

22 May 1927
Quarter-Final

Monaghan	2–5 – 1–2	Down

Pairc Esler, Newry

19 June 1927
Semi-Final

Cavan	1–6 – 2–6	Monaghan

St. Mary's Park, Castleblayney

26 June 1927
Semi-Final

Armagh	3–6 – 0–4	Antrim

Pairc Esler, Newry

31 July 1927
Final

Monaghan	3–5 – 2–5	Armagh

Athletic Grounds, Armagh

=== Semi-finals ===
28 August 1927
Semi-Final

Kerry	0–4 – 0–2	Leitrim
Paddy Whitty (0–1) & John Joe Sheehy (0–3).

Tuam

28 August 1927
Semi-Final

Kildare	1–7 – 0–2	Monaghan
T. Keogh 1–1, P. Doyle 0–3, P. Loughlin 0–2, W. Mangan 0–1.

Drogheda Park, Drogheda

=== Final ===
25 September 1927
Final

Kildare	0–5 – 0–3	Kerry
P. Doyle 0–2, W. Mangan, W. Gannon, J. Curtis 0–1.		John Joe Sheehy (0–1) & James Baily (0–2).

Croke Park, Dublin
Attendance: 36,529
Referee: T Shevlin (Roscommon)

== Statistics ==
=== Miscellaneous ===
- The Kilkenny GAA Grounds become known as Nowlan Park, after former President James Nowlan.
- Leitrim win a first Connacht title.
