= 2017 Connacht Senior Football Championship =

2017 Connacht SFC
Tournament details
- Year: 2017

Winners
- Champions: Roscommon (23rd win)
- Manager: Kevin McStay
- Captain: Ciarán Murtagh

Runners-up
- Runners-up: Galway
- Manager: Kevin Walsh
- Captain: Gary O'Donnell

Other
- Top Scorer: Cillian O'Connor (Mayo); 15 points (1-12)

The 2017 Connacht Senior Football Championship was the 118th installment of the annual Connacht Senior Football Championship organised by Connacht GAA. It is one of the four provincial competitions of the 2017 All-Ireland Senior Football Championship. Defending champions from 2016, Galway were dethroned by Roscommon, who won their first Connacht title since 2010.

== Teams ==
The Connacht championship is contested by the five counties in the Irish province of Connacht plus London and New York.

Team	Colours	Sponsor	Manager	Captain	Most recent success
Team	Colours	Sponsor	Manager	Captain	All-Ireland	Provincial
Galway	Maroon and white	Supermac's	Kevin Walsh	Gary O'Donnell	2001	2016
Leitrim	Green and gold	The Bush Hotel	Brendan Guckian	Donal Wrynn		1994
London	Green and white	Clayton Hotels	Ciarán Deely	Liam Gavaghan
Mayo	Green and red	Elverys Sports	Stephen Rochford	Cillian O'Connor	1951	2015
New York	Red, white and blue	Navillus Contracting	Justin O'Halloran	Gerard McCartan
Roscommon	Primrose and royal blue	Club Rossie	Kevin McStay	Ciarán Murtagh	1944	2010
Sligo	Black and white	AbbVie Inc.	Niall Carew	Neil Ewing		2007

== Bracket ==
Preliminary round
New York	1-13
Sligo	1-21

Quarter-finals
Mayo	2-14
Sligo	0-11
London	0-16
Leitrim	3-10

Semi-finals
Galway	0-15
Mayo	1-11
Roscommon	2-23
Leitrim	1-09

Final
Galway	0-12
Roscommon	2-15

== Fixtures ==
=== Preliminary round ===
7 May 2017
15:15 PM
Preliminary round

New York	1-13 – 1-21	Sligo
Eugene McVerry 1-5 (0-5f), Conor McGraynor 0-2 (2 '45), Shane Hogan, David Culhane, Ross Wherity, Daniel McKenna, Paddy Boyle, Kevin Connolly 0-1 each	Report	Mark Breheny (0-3f) and Adrian Marren (0-2f) 0-5 each, Kyle Cawley 1-1 (0-1f), Stephen Coen 0-3f, Paddy O’Connor and David Kelly 0-2 each, Aidan Devaney (1 '45), Keelan Cawley, Neil Ewing 0-1 each

Gaelic Park, New York City
Attendance: 5,000
Referee: David Gough (Meath)

=== Quarter-finals ===
21 May 2017
14:00
Quarter-Final

Mayo	2-14 – 0-11	Sligo
Cillian O’Connor 1-6 (0-5f), Diarmuid O’Connor 1-0, Fergal Boland and Andy Moran 0-2 each, Patrick Durcan, Kevin McLoughlin, Jason Doherty, Danny Kirby 0-1 each	Report	Adrian Marren 0-4 (0-2f, 1 '45), Mark Breheny (0-2f) and Stephen Coen 0-2 each, Aidan Devaney (0-1f), Paddy O'Connor, Niall Murphy 0-1 each

MacHale Park, Castlebar
Attendance: 14,661
Referee: Sean Hurson (Tyrone)
28 May 2017
15:30
Quarter-Final

London	0-16 – 3-10	Leitrim
Liam Gavaghan 0-8 (0-2f), Rory Mason 0-4 (0-1f), Conor Doran 0-2, Mark Gottsche (0-1f) and Owen Mulligan 0-1 each Report	Report	Ronan Kennedy 2-0, Darragh Rooney 1-2, Damien Moran 0-3, Keith Beirne 0-2 (0-1f), Dean McGovern, Brendan Gallagher (0-1f), Gary Plunkett 0-1 each

Emerald GAA Grounds, Ruislip
Referee: Noel Mooney (Cavan)

=== Semi-finals ===
11 June 2017
16:00
Semi-Final

Galway	0-15 – 1-11	Mayo
Sean Armstong 0-6 (3f, 3 '45), Damien Comer 0-2, G Sice 0-2 (2f), G Bradshaw, Johnny Heaney, Shane Walsh, Michael Daly, Eamonn Brannigan 0-1 each.	Report	Cillian O'Connor 0-6 (5f), Kevin McLoughlin 1-1, P Durcan, Fergal Boland, Diarmuid O'Connor, Andy Moran 0-1 each.

Pearse Stadium, Galway
Attendance: 22,046
Referee: Joe McQuillan (Cavan)
18 June 2017
15:30
Semi-Final

Roscommon	2-23 – 1-09	Leitrim
Diarmuid Murtagh 0-7 (1f), Conor Devaney 2-1, Ciaran Murtagh 0-4 (3fs, 0-1 pen), Enda Smith 0-3, Fintan Cregg, Brian Stack 0-2 each, Donie Smith, Niall Kilroy, Cian Connolly, Shane Killoran 0-1 each	Report	Darragh Rooney 1-2, Keith Beirne 0-3 (1f), Ronan Kennedy 0-2, Damien Moran, Brendan Gallagher 0-1 each

Dr. Hyde Park, Roscommon
Attendance: 8,844
Referee: Anthony Nolan (Wicklow)

=== Final ===
9 July 2017; 14:00; Final	Galway	0-12 - 2-15	Roscommon	Pearse Stadium, Galway; Attendance: 18,287; Referee: David Gough (Meath); Man of the Match: Enda Smith
9 July 2017; 14:00; Final	Shane Walsh 0-6 (4f), Paul Conroy 0-2 (1f), Damien Comer 0-2, Michael Daly, Gary O’Donnell 0-1 each.	Report	Diarmuid Murtagh 0-5 (3f), Cian Connolly 1-1, Ciaráin Murtagh 0-3 (2f), Brian Stack 1-0, Conor Devaney 0-3, Donie Smith 0-2 (1f), Shane Killoran 0-1.	Pearse Stadium, Galway; Attendance: 18,287; Referee: David Gough (Meath); Man of the Match: Enda Smith

== See also ==
- 2017 All-Ireland Senior Football Championship
  - 2017 Leinster Senior Football Championship
  - 2017 Munster Senior Football Championship
  - 2017 Ulster Senior Football Championship
