= 1980 All-Ireland Senior Football Championship final =

- Event: 1980 All-Ireland Senior Football Championship
Kerry	Roscommon
1–9 (12)	1–6 (9)
- Date: 21 September 1980
- Venue: Croke Park, Dublin
- Referee: Seamus Murray (Monaghan)
- Attendance: 63,854

The 1980 All-Ireland Senior Football Championship final was the 93rd All-Ireland Final and the deciding match of the 1980 All-Ireland Senior Football Championship, an inter-county Gaelic football tournament for the top teams in Ireland.

This was one of the 13 consecutive All-Ireland SFC finals contested by either Dublin or Kerry between 1974 and 1986, a period when one of either team always contested the decider.

== Pre-match ==
Roscommon had beaten Armagh in their semi-final.

== Match ==
=== Summary ===
Roscommon went five points up early on, John 'Jigger' O'Connor getting a goal after 35 seconds. Mikey Sheehy pegged a goal back and in a very scrappy game, (64 frees) the more experienced Kerry team ran out three-point victors.

Towards the end of the first half, Kerry player Pat Spillane lay down injured and referee Seamus Murray tried to raise him from the ground. Commentator Michael O'Hehir also doubted the authenticity of Spillane's injury, in remarks that angered the Kerry County Board.

Kerry completed a three-in-a-row sequence of titles; Tom Cryan wrote in the Irish Independent: "The first half has to be one of the worst ever seen in an All-Ireland final", Donal Carroll wrote in the same publication: "The statistics are chillingly disturbing in the awarding of 64 frees — 41 to Kerry — and six bookings, three to each side – made an utter shambles of what should have been an interesting trial of strength"; in 2022, Martin Breheny listed it among "five of the worst" All-Ireland SFC finals since 1972.

This was the first of five All-Ireland SFC titles won by Kerry in the 1980s.

=== Details ===
21 September 1980; Final	Kerry	1–9 – 1–6	Roscommon	Croke Park, Dublin; Attendance: 63,854; Referee: Seamus Murray (Monaghan)
21 September 1980; Final	M Sheehy 1–6, J O'Shea 0–1, G Power 0–1, P Spillane 0–1		J O'Connor 1–2, D Earley 0–1, S Hayden 0–1, J O'Gara 0–1, M Finneran 0–1	Croke Park, Dublin; Attendance: 63,854; Referee: Seamus Murray (Monaghan)

Kerry
Roscommon

Kerry =

- 1 C. Nelligan
- 2 J. Deenihan
- 3 J. O'Keeffe
- 4 P. Lynch
- 5 P. Ó Sé
- 6 T. Kennelly
- 17 G. O'Keeffe
- 8 J. O'Shea
- 9 S. Walsh
- 10 G. Power (c)
- 7 D. Moran
- 12 P. Spillane
- 13 M. Sheehy
- 11 T. Doyle
- 15 J. Egan

Sub used
19 G. O'Driscoll for G. Power

Subs not used
14 E. Liston
16 M. Spillane
18 D. O'Donoghue
20 J. Walsh
21 P. O'Mahony

Manager
M. O'Dwyer

Roscommon =

- 1 G. Sheerin
- 2 H. Keegan
- 3 P. Lindsay
- 4 G. Connellan
- 5 G. Fitzmaurice
- 6 T. Donnellan
- 7 D. Murray (c)
- 8 D. Earley
- 9 S. Hayden
- 10 J. O'Connor
- 11 J. O'Gara
- 12 A. Dooley
- 13 M. Finneran
- 14 T. McManus
- 15 É. McManus

Subs used
M. Dolphin for A. Dooley
M. McDermott for S. Hayden

Manager
T. Heneghan
