= Packy McGarty =

Irish Gaelic footballer (1933–2021)

Personal information
- Born: County Leitrim, Ireland

Sport
- Sport: Gaelic football
- Position: Forward
Club
- Years: Club
- Mohill
Inter-county
- Years: County
- 1949–1971: Leitrim
Inter-county titles
- Connacht titles: 1
- All Stars: 0

Packy McGarty (29 April 1933 – 6 April 2021) was a Gaelic football player from Mohill, County Leitrim. He played for the Leitrim County Team for 23 years between 1949 and 1971, playing his first senior game at the age of 16.

== Career ==
He played in four Connacht Senior Football Championship finals with Leitrim, from 1957 to 1960. In 1958 they were narrowly beaten by a Galway team backboned by the players who would win three consecutive All-Ireland Senior Football Championship titles between 1963 and 1966. In this match, he had his jersey torn to shreds by the Galway backs, and many spectators said his performance was one of the all-time great Gaelic football forward displays.

He played on his first Connacht Railway Cup Team at the age of 20 in 1954. He won his first Railway Cup with Connacht in 1957.

He won a Connacht Junior Football Championship in 1962, and was on the team which lost to Meath in the All-Ireland Junior Football Championship final.

He was included on the Gaelic football team of the century, of the great Gaelic Athletic Association (GAA) footballers who never won an All-Ireland medal.

He was the only Leitrim Player chosen on the Connacht GAA team of the millennium.

== Personal life ==
He lived in Clondalkin in Dublin, where he owned a grocery shop for many years.

He died in April 2021, aged 87.
