= 2018 FBD Insurance League =

Tournament details
- Province: Connacht
- Year: 2018
- Sponsor: FBD

Winners
- Champions: Roscommon (4th win)
- Manager: Kevin McStay
- Captain: Ciaráin Murtagh and Conor Devaney

Runners-up
- Runners-up: Galway
- Manager: Kevin Walsh
- Captain: Damien Comer

Other
- Matches played: 10

The 2018 FBD Insurance League was an inter-county and Gaelic football competition in the province of Connacht. All five Connacht county teams participated. No third-level college teams competed.

Galway and Roscommon were scheduled to play their fifth round tie on 21 January 2018. After the fourth-round games, both Galway and Roscommon had qualified for the final meaning that the result of their fifth round tie was irrelevant. Both teams requested that the either the match be cancelled or played as the final. The Connacht Council initially insisted that both the fifth round tie and the final be played in order to "respect the integrity of the Connacht FBD Football League". However, the game was cancelled on 21 January due to poor weather and the Connacht Council eventually agreed not to play the "dead rubber."

Roscommon were the winners.

== Format ==
Each team plays the other teams once, earning 2 points for a win and 1 for a draw. The top two teams play in the final.

== Group stage ==
Team	Pld	W	D	L	Pts	Diff
Roscommon	3	3	0	0	6	+29
Galway	3	3	0	0	6	+12
Mayo	4	1	1	2	3	–2
Sligo	4	1	0	3	2	–7
Leitrim	4	0	1	3	1	–32

- Galway v. Roscommon not played

== Final ==
18 February 2018
2 p.m.

Roscommon	2-16 – 3-12	Galway
Cathal Cregg 1-4, Ciaráin Murtagh 0-4 (2fs), Enda Smith 1-1, Donie Smith 0-3 (1f), Diarmuid Murtagh 0-2 (1f), Ross Timothy and Niall Daly 0-1 each	Report	Frankie Burke 2-0, Barry McHugh 0-4 (2fs), Dessie Conneely 1-0, Sean Armstrong 0-2, Padraic Cunningham, Adrian Varley, Robert Finnerty (f), Eoin Finnerty, Tomás Flynn and Johnny Heaney 0-1 each

Dr. Hyde Park, Roscommon
Referee: Eamonn O’Grady (Leitrim)
