= Emlyn Mulligan =

Irish Gaelic footballer

Personal information
- Nickname: muggsy
- Born: 18 December 1987 (age 38) Kinlough, Ireland
- Occupation: Garda
- Height: 1.83 m (6 ft 0 in)

Sport
- Sport: Gaelic football
- Position: Centre forward
Clubs
- Years: Club
- 2004–2012 2013– 2017–2020 2021–: Melvin Gaels; St Brigid's; Melvin Gaels; St Mary's
Club titles
- Leitrim titles: 1
Inter-county
- Years: County
- 2006–2014 201?–2019?: Leitrim; Leitrim

Emlyn Mulligan (born 18 December 1987) is a Gaelic footballer from County Leitrim who plays for the Sligo based St Mary's club and formerly for the Leitrim county team. A top class free-taker, he scored 1–34 in the 2008 National Football League. The high point of his career came in captaining Leitrim to the FBD Insurance League in 2013 – though it a notable achievement in this case as it was only Leitrim's fourth ever trophy and their first since 1994. He is widely considered as one of the greatest ever players to grace the Connacht championship. He scored 3–8 in New York in 2013, described by experts as "some feat". He took a year out to go travelling ahead of Leitrim's 2015 campaign.

A Garda, he has also played soccer with Sligo Rovers. He has played for Connacht too, helping them to a first Interprovincial Championship for over 40 years in 2014.

After four years with the Dublin GAA club St Brigid's, Mulligan returned to his native Melvin Gaels in 2017 and, in January 2021, residing in Sligo, he transferred from Melvin Gaels to the St Mary's club. He did so having left the Leitrim team in 2019 following a third injury to his knee and went uncalled for by his county in 2020.

He also served as a selector with the Leitrim minor team. Mulligan then moved up to the Leitrim under-20 team in 2021 when Brendan Guckian (1994 Connacht Senior Football Championship winner) went there.

== Honours ==
- Leitrim Senior Football Championship (1): 2012
- FBD Insurance League (2): 2013 (c), 2014 (c)
- Interprovincial Championship (1): 2014
