= Fergal O'Donnell =

Irish Gaelic footballer and manager

Personal information
- Born: Roscommon Town, County Roscommon, Ireland
- Occupation: Garda Síochána

Sport
- Sport: Gaelic football
- Position: Forward
Club
- Years: Club
- Roscommon Gaels
Club titles
- Roscommon titles: 5
Inter-county
- Years: County
- 1992–2003: Roscommon
Inter-county titles
- Connacht titles: 1
- All-Irelands: 0
- NFL: 0
- All Stars: 0

Fergal O'Donnell is an Irish former Gaelic football manager and player. As a player, he captained the Roscommon county team to the 2001 Connacht Senior Football Championship title. He also won a Connacht Minor Football Championship in 1989.

From County Roscommon, O'Donnell played his club football for Roscommon Gaels, with whom he won Roscommon Senior Football Championship medals in 1994, 1998, 1999 2001 and 2004.

After retiring from playing he went into management. In 2006 he led Roscommon to a shock Connacht Minor Football Championship and All-Ireland Minor Football Championship. In 2010 he once again led Roscommon to a Connacht Senior Football Championship, this time as manager of the team. In October 2011 O'Donnell resigned as manager due to work commitments.

O'Donnell returned to management in 2013 when he took over Roscommon minor team once more. He led them back to back Connacht final appearances but lost on both occasions to Mayo. The highlight of his term was beating hot favourites Kildare to reach an All-Ireland semi-final O'Donnell stepped down from his post after a narrow All-Ireland quarter-final defeat to Ulster champions Donegal the following year

In October 2015, it was confirmed that O'Donnell would become joint manager of Roscommon senior team alongside his former Roscommon Gaels teammate Kevin McStay. He announced he was standing aside in September 2016, leaving McStay in sole charge of the team.
