= Gerry Fitzmaurice =

Irish Gaelic footballer

Gerry Fitzmaurice is an Irish former Gaelic footballer who played for the Roscommon county team. His playing position was a defensive one.

Fitzmaurice was a selector as part of John Maughan's backroom team when Maughan managed Roscommon. He left in 2008, when Maughan resigned.
