= Cillian O'Connor =

Mayo Gaelic footballer

Personal information
- Native name: Cillian Ó Conchúir (Irish)
- Born: 13 May 1992 (age 34) Castlebar, Ireland
- Occupations: Director, Recruitment Firm
- Height: 1.85 m (6 ft 1 in)

Sport
- Sport: Gaelic football
- Position: Corner forward
Club
- Years: Club
- 2009–: Ballintubber
Club titles
- Mayo titles: 5
Inter-county*
Years	County	Apps (scores)
2011–2026	Mayo	75 (34–367)
Inter-county titles
- Connacht titles: 7
- All-Irelands: 1
- NFL: 2
- All Stars: 2
- *Inter County team apps and scores correct as of 14:00, 7 December 2025.

Cillian O'Connor (born 1992) is an Irish Gaelic footballer who plays for Ballintubber and previously with the Mayo county team. O'Connor is the leading all-time top scorer in the All-Ireland Senior Football Championship

== Career ==
O'Connor made his Ballintubber club debut whilst still a teenager in 2010. A year later, he made his county debut for Mayo in the Connacht Senior Football Championship against London at Emerald GAA Grounds in South Ruislip after being called up by former Ballintubber manager James Horan, who had given O'Connor his Ballintubber debut as well. O'Connor was named as the captain of Mayo in 2013 after having won two Young Player of the Year awards in the previous two years and led them to the 2013 All-Ireland Senior Football Championship Final. In 2014, he was awarded a GAA GPA All-Star Award after being the top scorer in the 2014 season and leading Mayo to the 2014 All-Ireland Senior Football Championship semi-finals. He won his second GAA GPA All Stars award for his performance in the 2020 season.

In 2015, O'Connor was in the running for the Golden Boot and initially finished tied for top with Fermanagh's Seán Quigley. However, following a review of Mayo's championship winning DVD, the Gaelic Athletic Association realised they had incorrectly noted O'Connor's score as they had recorded him as having scored 1-6 but he had actually scored 1–7. As a result, O'Connor's tally was increased by 1 which allowed him to claim the Golden Boot.

In 2019, O'Connor became the highest scoring player in the All-Ireland Senior Football Championship, surpassing Kerry's Colm Cooper's record. He had done this by scoring in all of his previous 51 previous Championship matches prior to the record breaking match, except for one game against London in 2013 when he had been black carded. He broke the scoring record for a single championship game with four goals and nine points in the 2020 All-Ireland Senior Football Championship semi-final at Croke Park.

O'Connor sustained an injury to his achilles tendon in the first half of his county's 2021 National Football League promotion play-off win against Clare at Cusack Park and later underwent surgery. It was his 100th appearance for the team. The injury meant he could not play for Mayo again that season. He made his return to Senior Inter County Football off the bench after 56 minutes in the 2022 National League Final.

On 26 July 2026, O’Connor won the 2026 All-Ireland Senior Football Championship with Mayo, having been part of the extended panel. On 7 October 2026, he announced his retirement from Inter-County football.

== Scoring record ==
Inter-county scoring record by year and competition
Year	League appearances	League goals	League points	Championship appearances	Championship goals	Championship points	Total appearances	Total goals	Total points
2011	3	0	1	5	1	19	8	1	20
2012	7	0	15	5	0	28	12	0	43
2013	4	0	18	5	6	22	9	6	40
2014	4	1	11	6	5	36	10	6	47
2015	3	1	11	5	3	34	8	4	45
2016	2	1	5	9	2	44	11	3	49
2017	7	2	32	10	3	66	17	5	98
2018	5	0	11	4	3	22	8	3	33
2019	0	0	0	6	2	26	6	2	26
2020	1	0	10	5	5	40	6	5	50
2021	4	2	24	0	0	0	4	2	24
2022	1	0	1	4	1	18	5	1	19
2023	3	0	3	3	0	2	6	0	6
2024	6	2	5	2	1	2	5	2	2
Totals	52	9	155	70	32	363	122	41	518

== Honours ==
Inter-county

- All-Ireland Senior Football Championship (1): 2026
- Connacht Senior Football Championship (7): 2011, 2012, 2013, 2014, 2015, 2020, 2021,
- National Football League (2): 2019, 2023
- FBD League: 2023

Club

- Mayo Senior Football Championship (5): 2010, 2011, 2014, 2018, 2019
- Mayo U21 A Football Championship (2): 2009, 2010

Individual

- GAA/GPA Young Footballer of the Year (2) 2011, 2012
- All Star: (2) 2014, 2020
- Mayo Footballer of the Year (1) 2011

Awards
Preceded by Aidan Walsh (Cork)	GAA/GPA Young Footballer of the Year; 2011, 2012	Succeeded by Jack McCaffrey (Dublin)
