= 2012 FBD Insurance League =

2012 FBD Insurance Leaguea
Tournament details
- Sponsor: FBD

Winners
- Champions: Mayo (7th win)
- Manager: James Horan
- Captain: Alan Dillon

Runners-up
- Runners-up: NUI Galway
- Manager: John Maughan

The 2012 FBD Insurance League was an inter-county and colleges Gaelic football competition in the province of Connacht. As well as the five county teams and London, three colleges' teams competed: Institute of Technology, Sligo, NUI Galway and Galway-Mayo Institute of Technology (GMIT). Leitrim won for the second year in a row.

== Format ==
The teams are drawn into two groups of 4 and 5 teams. Each team plays the other teams in its group once, earning 2 points for a win and 1 for a draw. The two group winners play in the final. The winners were supposed to play a further game against New York, but this game was never played.

== Results ==
=== Final ===
28 January 2012
Final

Mayo	0-14 – 0-4	NUI Galway
	Report

Markievicz Park, Sligo
