= Gary O'Donnell (Gaelic footballer) =

Irish Gaelic footballer

Personal information
- Native name: Garraí Ó Domhnaill (Irish)
- Born: 6 January 1988 (age 38) Galway, Ireland
- Height: 1.88 m (6 ft 2 in)

Sport
- Sport: Gaelic Football
- Position: Centre Back
Clubs
- Years: Club
- 2004–2008 2009–: St. Colman's, Gort; Tuam Stars
Inter-county
- Years: County
- 2008–2021: Galway
Inter-county titles
- Connacht titles: 3
- NFL: 1

Gary O'Donnell (born 6 January 1988) is an Irish sportsperson, who plays inter-county Gaelic football for Galway. He is a first cousin of double All-Ireland-winning former Galway footballer and two-time All Star Jarlath Fallon. O'Donnell's parents are both from County Mayo and he has uncles who have played football for that county at a number of levels.

O'Donnell, who first played football with St Colman's, Gort, also played hurling in his youth and was on the same under-age teams as later Galway senior inter-county players Aidan Harte and Greg Lally. Gort's football team disbanded in 2009 and O'Donnell moved to Tuam Stars, as it was the club his cousins, the Fallons, played for.

Having been an unused substitute in Galway's 2008 Connacht final victory over Mayo, O'Donnell made his inter-county debut with in 2009. In 2016, O'Donnell was named Galway captain by Kevin Walsh, having previously captained the side on occasions when Paul Conroy wasn't available. On 17 July 2016, Galway won the Connacht Championship, and O'Donnell became the first Galway player since Pádraic Joyce in 2008 to receive the J. J. Nestor Cup.

In October 2021, he announced his retirement from inter-county football.

| Preceded by Paul Conroy | Galway Senior Football Captain; 2016–2017 | Succeeded by Damien Comer |
