= 1978–79 National Football League (Ireland) =

Gaelic football competition

League details
- Dates: October 1978 – 13 May 1979

League champions
- Winners: Roscommon (1st win)
- Captain: Danny Murray
- Manager: Tom Heneghan

League runners-up
- Runners-up: Cork

The 1978–79 National Football League was the 48th staging of the National Football League (NFL), an annual Gaelic football tournament for the Gaelic Athletic Association county teams of Ireland.

Roscommon won their first and only NFL title with a win over Cork in the final.

== Format ==
=== Knockout stage qualifiers ===
- Division One (North): top 3 teams
- Division One (South): top 3 teams
- Division Two (North): winners
- Division Two (South): winners

== Group stage ==
=== Division One (South) ===
==== Table ====
Team	Pld	W	D	L	Pts	Notes
Cork	5	4	1	0	9	Qualified for Knockout Stages
Kerry	5	4	0	1	8	Qualified for Knockout Stages
Kildare	5	3	0	2	6	Qualified for Knockout Stages
Galway	5	1	2	2	4
Dublin	5	1	1	3	3
Laois	5	0	0	5	0

==== Division Two (North) Final ====
4 March 1979 Final	Armagh	3-2 — 0-8	Sligo	Breffni Park, Cavan
				Referee: P. Collins, Westmeath

==== Division Two (South) Final ====
25 March 1979 Final	Offaly	2-8 — 1-7	Wexford	Athy

== Knockout stage ==
=== Quarter-finals ===
1 April 1979

Offaly	3-12 – 1-4	Tyrone

Croke Park, Dublin

1 April 1979

Roscommon	1-12 – 1-11	Kerry

Croke Park, Dublin

8 April 1979

Kildare	0-11 – 0-7	Down

Croke Park, Dublin
Attendance: 12,654

8 April 1979

Cork	1-8 – 0-7	Armagh

Croke Park, Dublin
Attendance: 12,654
Referee: K. Campbell Meath

=== Semi-finals ===
15 April 1979

Roscommon	1-14 – 0-13	Offaly

Croke Park, Dublin

22 April 1979

Cork	2-9 – 0-4	Kildare

Croke Park, Dublin

=== Finals ===
13 May 1979
Final

Roscommon	0-15 – 1-3	Cork

Croke Park, Dublin
Attendance: 29,245
Referee: Hugh Duggan (Armagh)
