= FBD Insurance League =

Annual Gaelic football competition

- Current season or competition: 2027 FBD League
- Irish: Sraith Peile FBD
- Code: Gaelic football
- Founded: 1995
- Region: Connacht and London (GAA)
- Trophy: Paddy Francis Dwyer Cup
- No. of teams: 6 (2026)
- Title holders: Galway (11th title)
- First winner: Mayo
- Most titles: Galway (11 titles)
- Sponsors: FBD

The FBD League, also called the FBD Insurance League, FBD Connacht League, the Connacht FBD Football League or FBD Insurance Connacht GAA Senior Football Competition, is an annual Gaelic football competition organised by Connacht GAA and sponsored by FBD. The participants are the five county teams of Connacht and (since 2024) London.

Formerly several third-level college teams also competed, but from 2018 onward it became an all-county-team tournament. In 2019 and 2020 it was a knockout tournament with no league element, and so it was called the "Connacht GAA Senior Football Competition"; in 2023 and 2024 it was simply referred to as "the FBD." It was cancelled in 2021 due to the impact of the COVID-19 pandemic on Gaelic games, but returned in January 2022.

Galway lead the way with most titles.

The trophy is named for Paddy Francis Dwyer (1937–1994), a longtime referee and official with Oran and the Roscommon County Board; he was also an activist in the National Farmers' Association in their 1966–67 farmers' rights campaign. He was the manager of FBD Insurance in the Connacht region.

== Roll of honour ==
Team	Wins	Years won
Galway	11	1998, 2001, 2002, 2006, 2008, 2009, 2016, 2017, 2020, 2022, 2026
Mayo	8	1995, 1996, 2000, 2003, 2010, 2011, 2012, 2023
Roscommon	6	1997, 1999, 2015, 2018, 2019, 2024
Leitrim	2	2013, 2014
Sligo	1	2004
GMIT	1	2005
IT Sligo	1	2007

No tournament was held in 2021 or 2025.

== List of finals ==
Year	Winners		Runners-up	
Year	County	Score	County	Score
2026	Galway	2-12	Mayo	1-14
2025	No competition due to fixture congestion			
2024	Roscommon	2-25	Galway	0-13
2023	Mayo	0-13	Roscommon	0-9
2022	Galway	1-18	Roscommon	1-16
2021	No competition due to Covid-19 pandemic			
2020	Galway	1-14	Roscommon	0-11
2019	Roscommon	0-13	Galway	1-5
2018	Roscommon	2-16	Galway	3-12
2017	Galway	2-14	Roscommon	0-15
2016	Galway	2-8	Roscommon	0-13
2015	Roscommon	4-8	Galway	0-12
2014	Leitrim	2-5	Roscommon	1-7
2013	Leitrim	0-8	Sligo	0-5
2012	Mayo	0-14	NUI Galway	0-4
2011	Mayo	7-12	New York	2-8
2010	Mayo	0-12	Galway	0-9
2009	Galway	2-15	Roscommon	1-14
2008	Galway	4-9	NUI Galway	2-10
2007	IT Sligo	1-11	Galway	1-9
2006	Galway	2-8	Mayo	0-9
2005	GMIT	1-14; 1-19; 0-13	NUI Galway	0-17; 2-16; 2-4
2004	Sligo	1-12	Mayo	0-8
2003	Mayo	0-14	Roscommon	0-6
2002	Galway	4-12	Sligo	2-12
2001	Galway	1-11	Roscommon	1-10
2000	Mayo	2-9	Galway	0-11
1999	Roscommon	1-10; 1-12	Galway	1-10; 3-3
1998	Galway	1-5	Roscommon	0-7
1997	Roscommon	2-6	Mayo	0-7
1996	Mayo	1-9	Galway	0-9
1995	Mayo	1-9; 0-16	Galway	0-12; 0-15
