= Institute of Technology, Sligo =

Former higher educational institution in Sligo, Ireland

- Institiúid Teicneolaíochta Sligeach
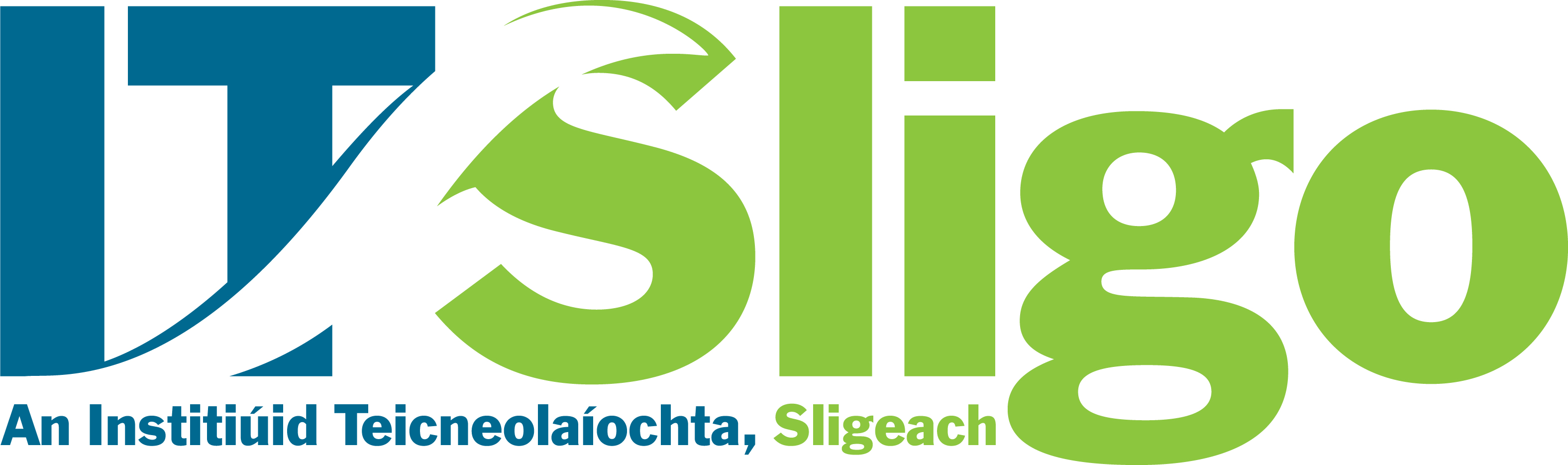
- Type: Public
- Active: 1971–April 2022
- Affiliations: Atlantic Technological University
- President: Brendan McCormack
- Academic staff: 470
- Students: 6,000
- Location: Ash Lane, Sligo, Connacht, F91 YW50, Ireland; 54.278°N 8.460°W
- Campus: 70 acres (280,000 m^{2})
- Website: www.itsligo.ie

The Institute of Technology, Sligo (ITS; Irish: Institiúid Teicneolaíochta, Sligeach) was an institute of technology, located in Sligo, Ireland. In April 2022, it was formally dissolved, and its functions became part of Atlantic Technological University (ATU). As of 2021, the institute had three faculties and nine departments.

== History ==
The institute opened in 1970 as a Regional Technical College, and adopted the name 'Institute of Technology, Sligo' on 7 May 1997. The first students graduated with degrees from Sligo RTC in 1986.

Con Power, who acted as principal of the college from 1972 until 1979, was later involved with other state bodies. Terri Scott was the institute's first female president, serving from 2008 until 2014. She was succeeded by Vincent Cunnane in October 2014. Brendan McCormack was appointed as president in September 2016.

== Development ==
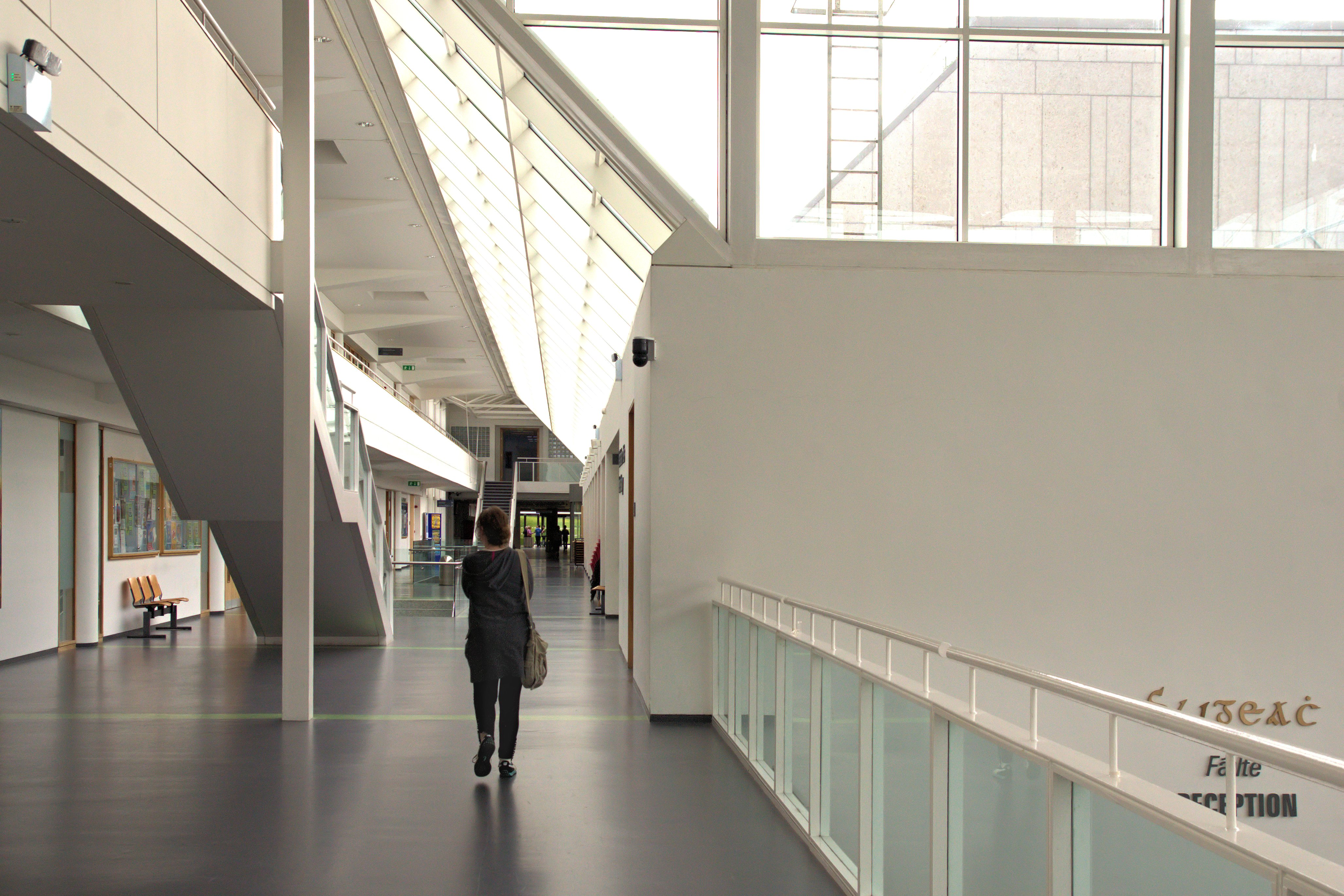
IT Sligo's "Main Concourse"

IT Sligo developed a number of distance learning options, and as of 2016 reportedly had 1,800 online learners registered on various online programmes. This subsequently increased to approximately 3000 online learners.

In sports, the college has both ladies' and men's Gaelic football and soccer teams, with the men's gaelic football team winning the Sigerson Cup three times during the six years up to 2005.

In technology, IT Sligo's "Team Hermes" won the software design category of the 2011 Microsoft Imagine Cup (a world student technology competition, held in 2011 in New York).

== Atlantic Technological University ==
As of October 2018, Sligo IT was reportedly working with GMIT and Letterkenny IT to potentially form a Technological University for the West/North-West of Ireland. In October 2020, the constituent IT's were allocated over €5.5 million towards transformation.

Formal approval was granted in October 2021. Atlantic TU began formal operations in April 2022.

== Gallery ==
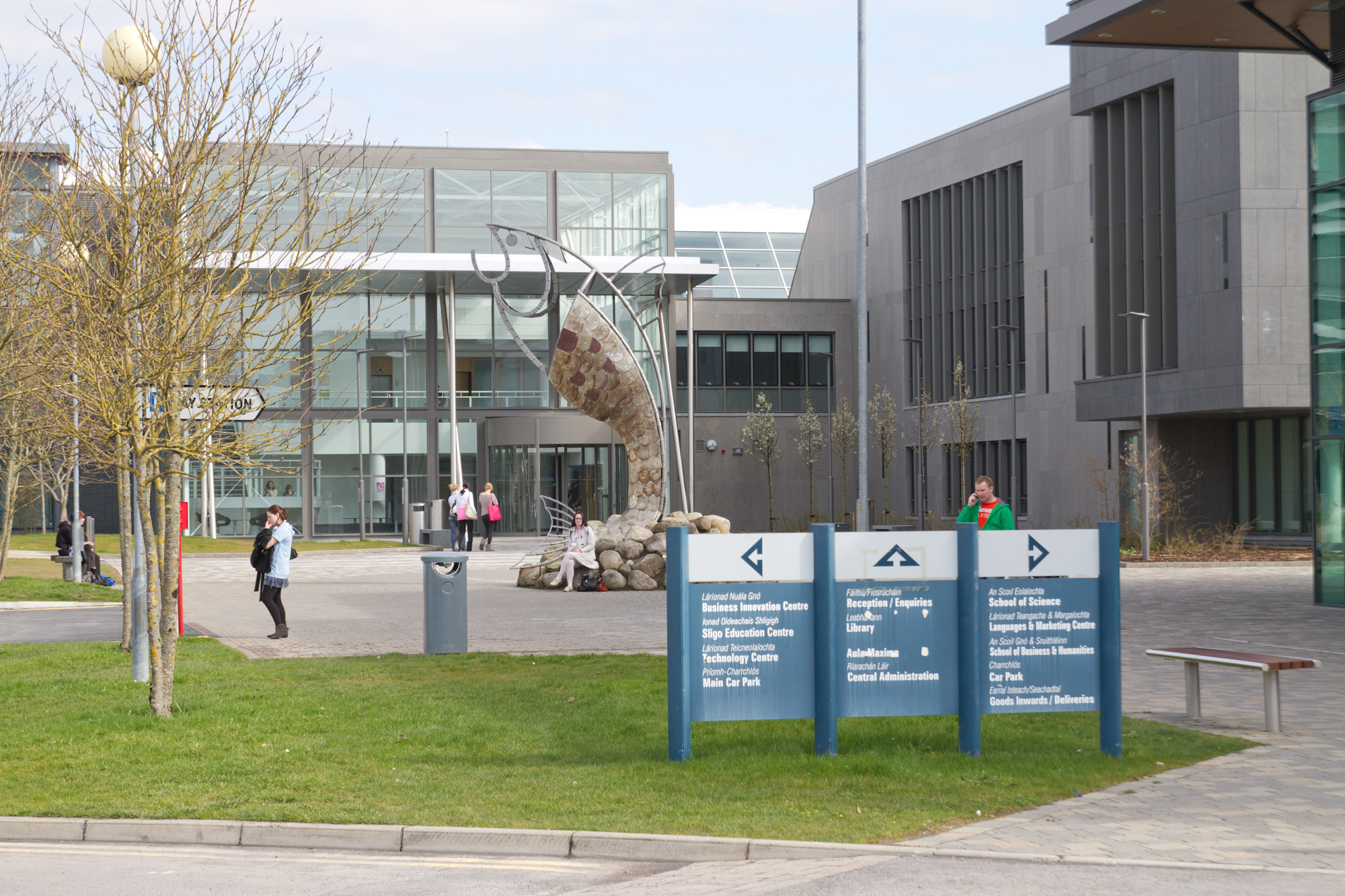
Main entrance to IT Sligo

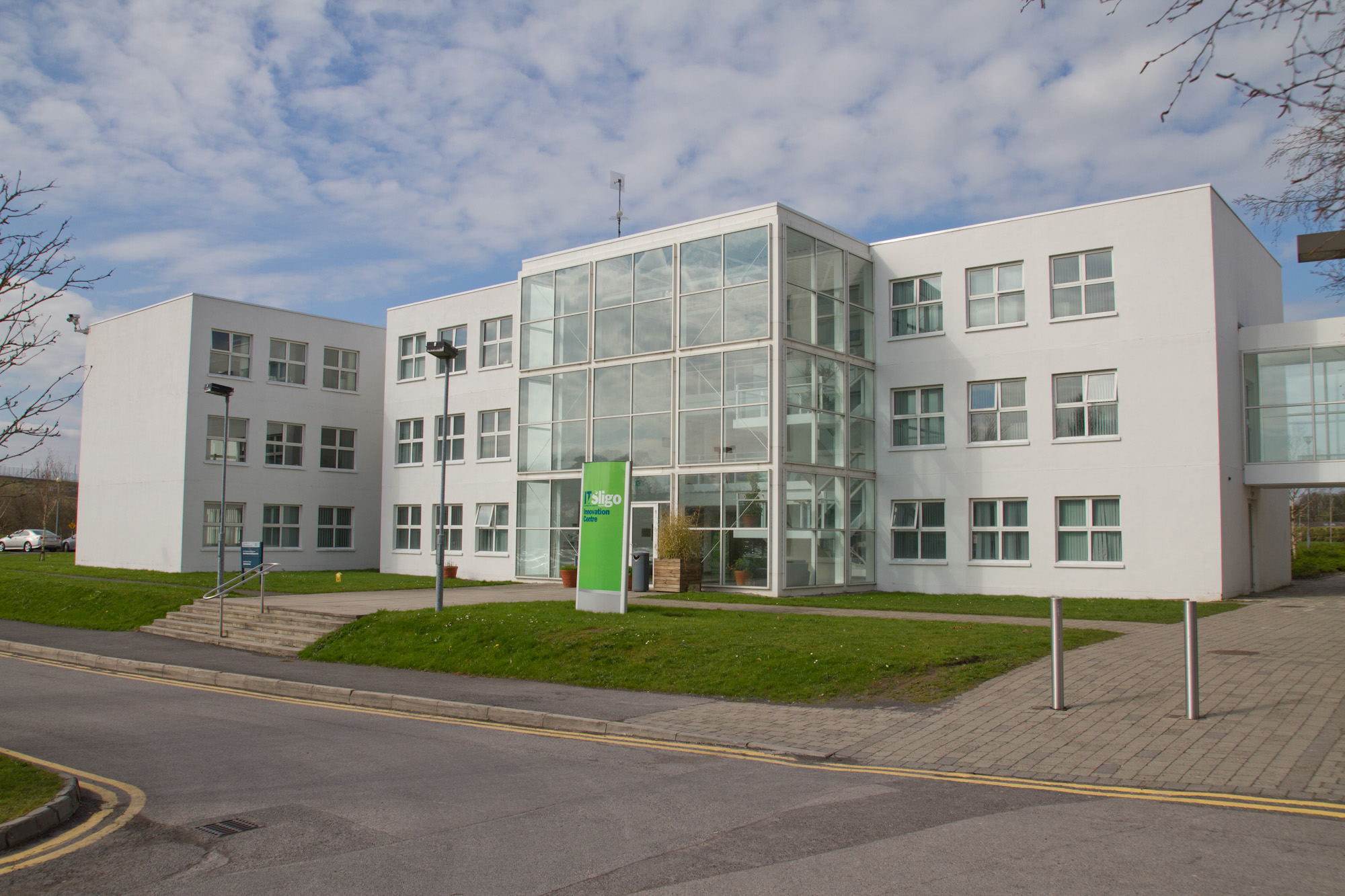
Business Innovation Centre (BIC) at IT Sligo

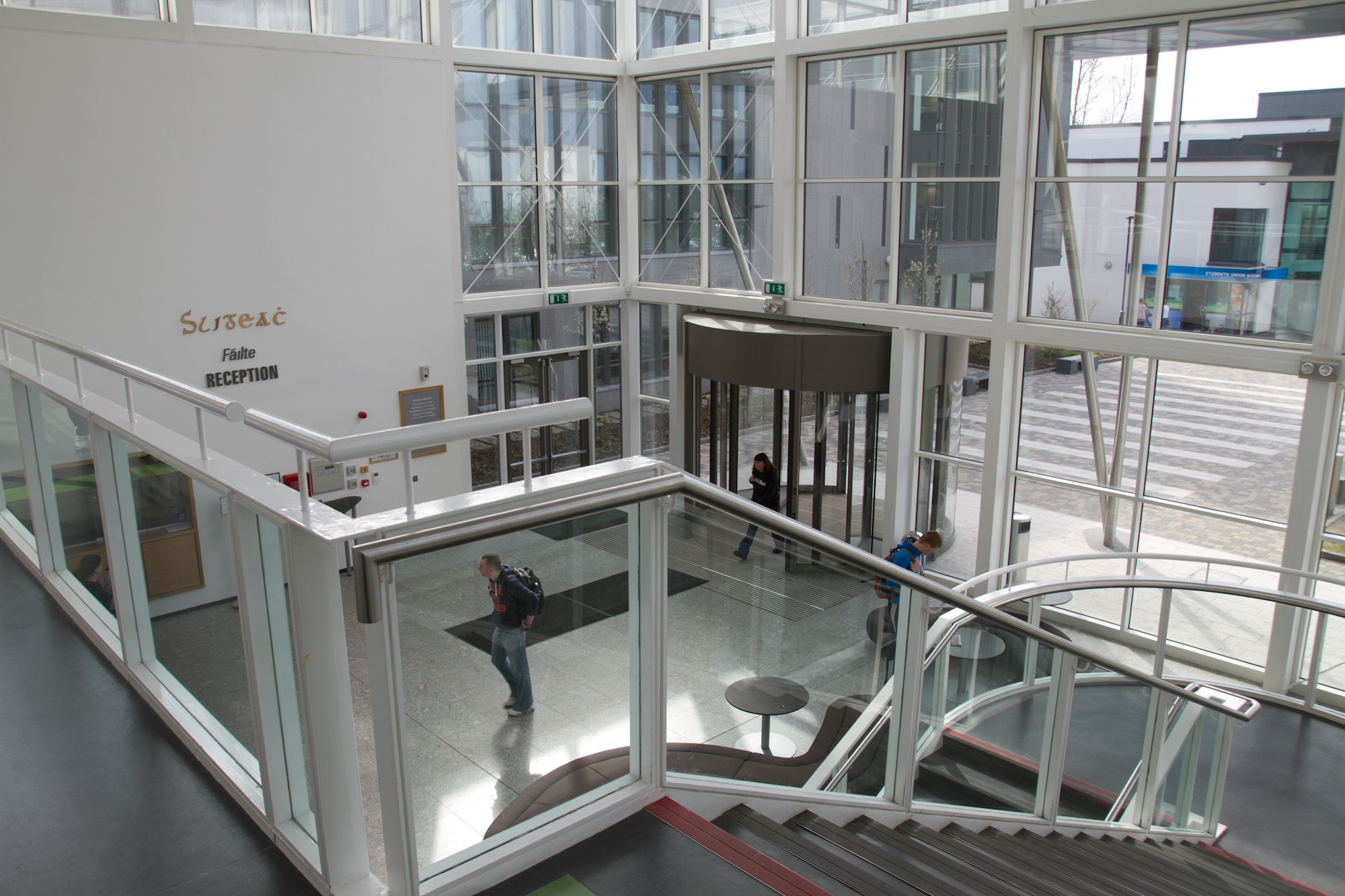
Main reception

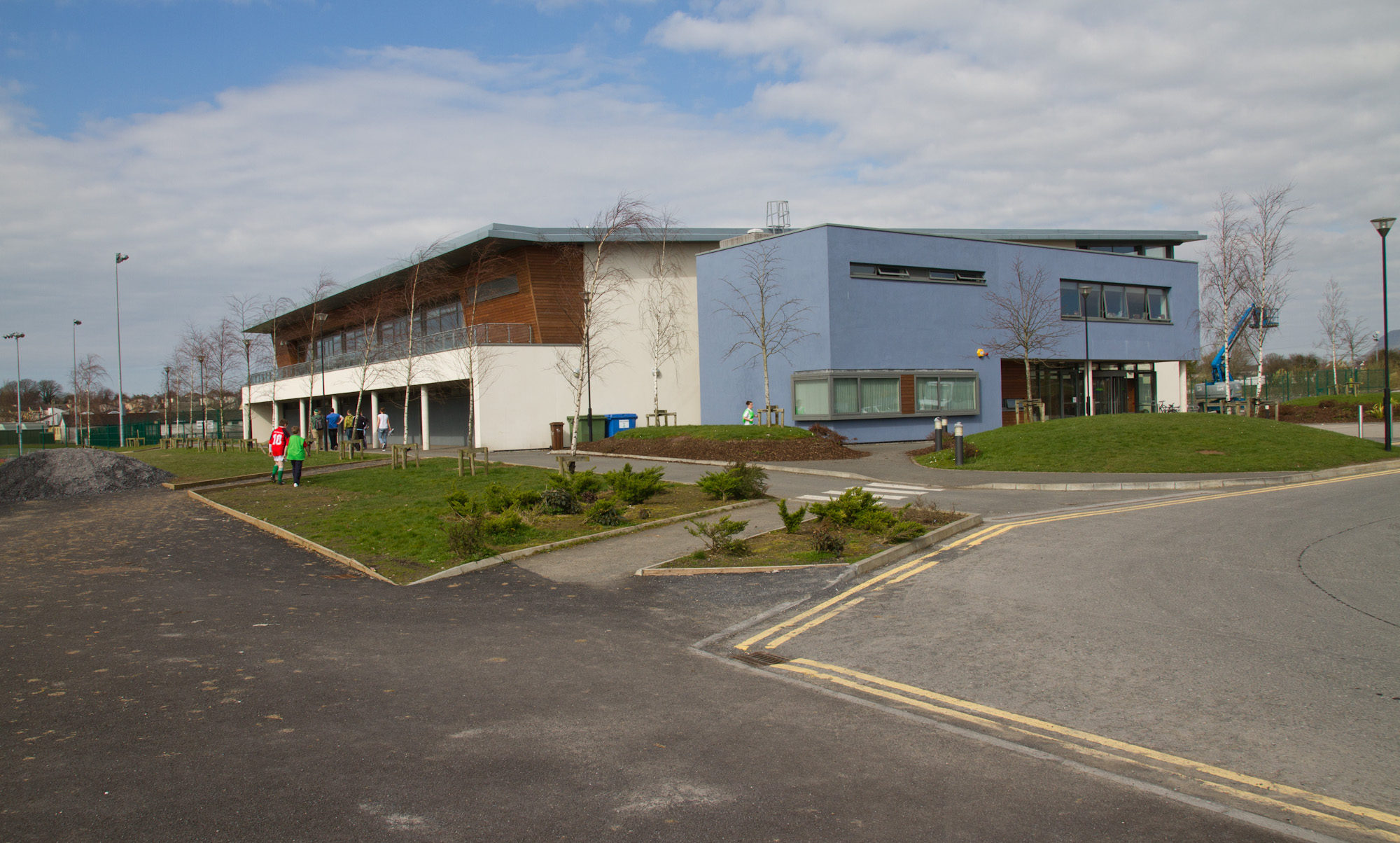
Sports centre at IT Sligo

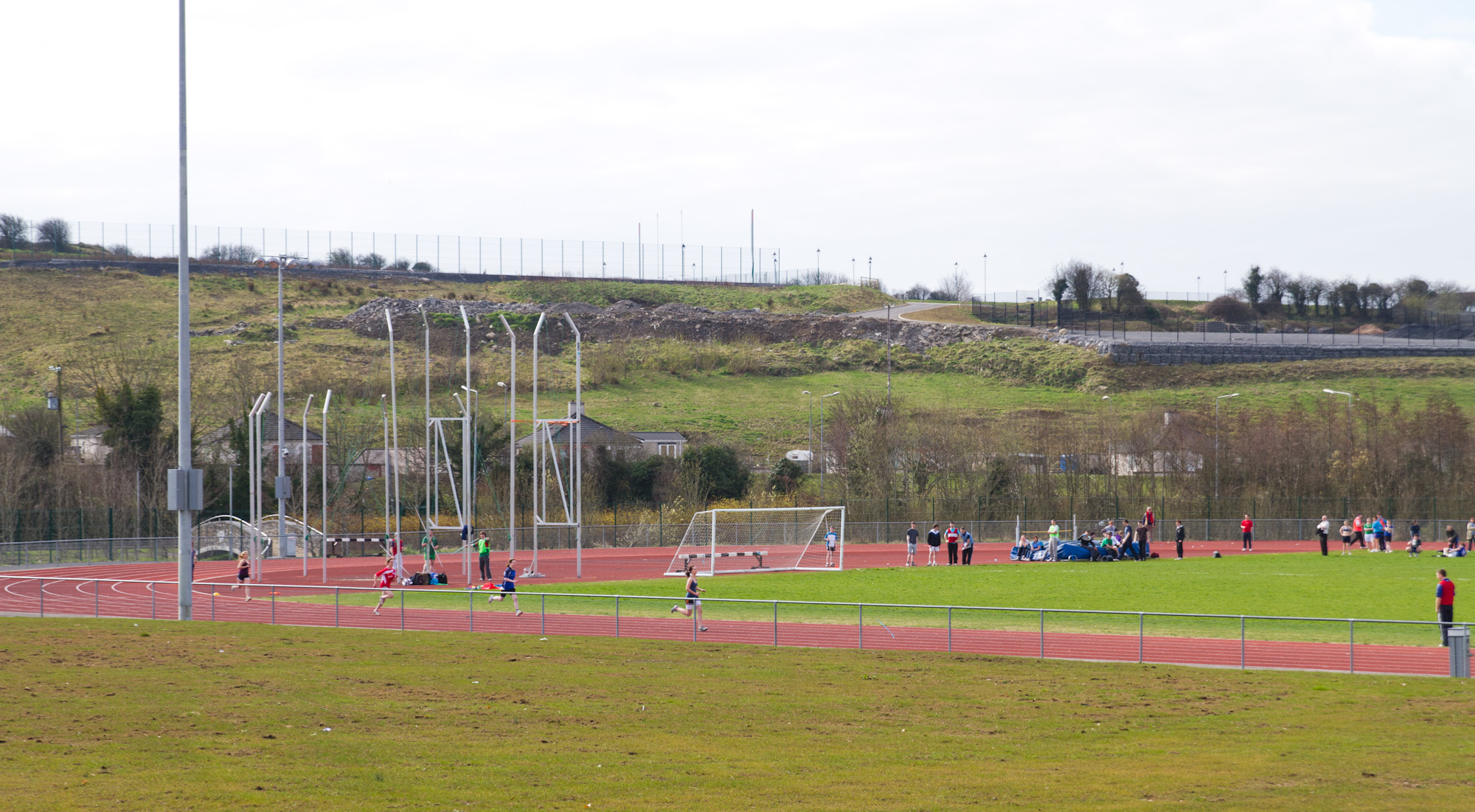
400m running track

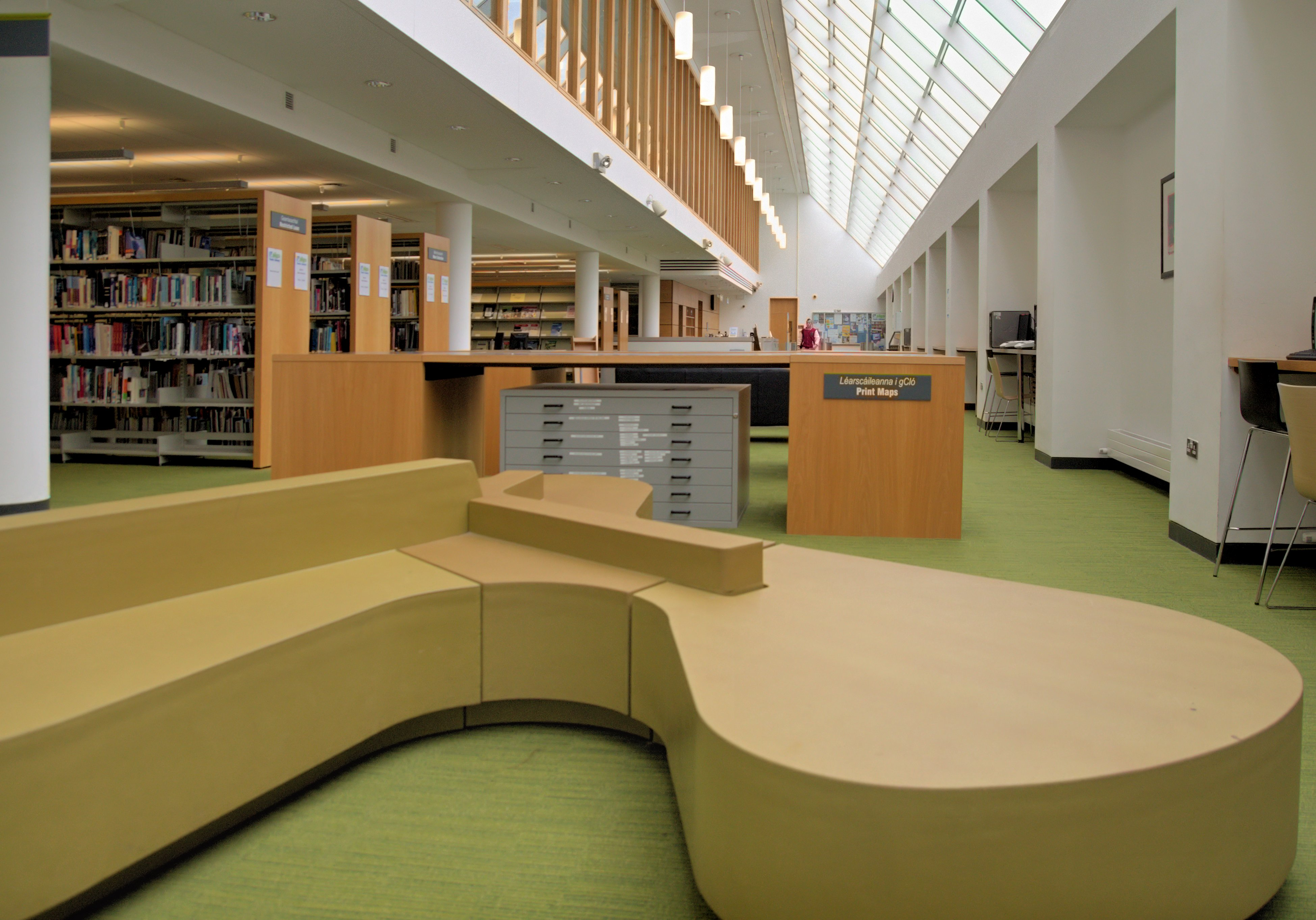
Section of library
