= Leitrim county football team =

Gaelic football team

Leitrim
- Sport: Football
- Irish: Liatroim
- Nickname(s): The Canaries; The Ridge County
- County board: Leitrim GAA
- Manager: Steven Poacher
- Captain: David Bruen
- Home venue(s): Páirc Seán Mac Diarmada, Carrick-on-Shannon

Recent competitive record
- Current All-Ireland status: Connacht (SF) in 2025
- Last championship title: None
- Current NFL Division: 3 (8th in 2025; relegated to Division 4)
- Last league title: None
First colours	Second colours

The Leitrim county football team (/ˈliːtrəm/ LEE-trəm) represents Leitrim in men's Gaelic football and is governed by Leitrim GAA, the county board of the Gaelic Athletic Association. The team competes in the three major annual inter-county competitions; the All-Ireland Senior Football Championship, the Connacht Senior Football Championship, and the National Football League.

Leitrim's home ground is Páirc Seán Mac Diarmada, Carrick-on-Shannon. The team's manager is Steven Poacher.

Considered "Connacht's traditional minnows", the team last won the Connacht Senior Championship in 1994 but has never won the All-Ireland Senior Championship or the National League.

== History ==
Leitrim's football history has brought sparse reward. They first competed in the All-Ireland in the 1907 championship. They were beaten by Roscommon on a score of 0-03 to 0-01 in the Connacht semi-final in their first ever match. The county won its first ever match in the 1910 championship, beating Sligo in the Connacht quarter-final by 0-03 to 0-00. They were then beaten by Galway in the semi-final.

Leitrim did not record another win until the 1914 championship. They beat Sligo by 5-07 0-02 to qualify for their first ever Connacht final but were beaten by Roscommon in the decider. In the semi-final of the 1924 Connacht Championship, Leitrim forced Mayo to a draw, then refused to play extra-time. Galway went on to be beaten in the final by Mayo following a replay. In 1927, with training from Sean O'Hehir, father of the veteran radio commentator Micheál and with the help of good fortune when Connacht semi-finalists Roscommon had to line out without five players whose car had broken down, Leitrim won their first ever Connacht title. Leitrim won the Connacht title and held Kerry to two points in the semi-final of the All-Ireland Senior Football Championship.

They withdrew from Connacht championship (1934-1941) again (1950-1952).

In the days of Cathal Flynn, Colin McNulty and Packie McGarty, both Connacht Railway Cup players, Leitrim lost four successive Connacht finals to Galway between 1957 and 1960, coming closest in 1958 when they equalised midway through the second half but were defeated by two points (Cathal Flynn scored 1-6). Flynn retired in 1966 from inter-county football while McGarty was at the end of his career when Leitrim were heavily beaten by a score 4-15 to 0-7 against Mayo in the Connacht final in 1967, scoring only one point from play. Leitrim won the National Football League Division 2 title and contested the 1959 NFL semi-final with a changed fullback line but were beaten by Derry by seven points. A new generation of Leitrim under-21 players hosted and nearly beat the great Kerry team at Carrick-on-Shannon in 1977 before losing by five points, 3-13 to 3-8. The expected breakthrough from Michael Martin and his men never happened.

John O'Mahony was appointed Leitrim manager to build on the success of the Under-21 team that won the 1991 Connacht Championship. He took Leitrim to the final of the 1994 Connacht Championship. Leitrim did not have an easy route to the final, beating Roscommon by a point and only overcoming Galway by a point in a replay. They took on Mayo in the final, overcoming O'Mahony's native county by two points in Hyde Park. O'Mahony's feat in leading the team that is traditionally the weakest in the province to that title is still heralded nationally to this day. Leitrim were ultimately beaten in the All-Ireland semi-final by Dublin at Croke Park. Since losing to Sligo in 1989, Leitrim had suffered a series of near-misses, and might have followed up 1994 against Galway, losing by a single point in 1995 and two points in 1996. The first county to benefit under the parentage rule was also the first to lose their big catch, with the loss of Declan Darcy to Dublin depleting the panel in 1998, bringing Leitrim's most successful era to an end.

Leitrim sprung a massive shock when they won the FBD Insurance League in 2013, defeating their southern neighbours Sligo in the final. This was the county's fourth ever trophy and their first since 1994. As the Irish Independent reported, "There may have been no danger of any cows going unmilked in Leitrim after this game, but winning their first FBD League title – and their first trophy in 19 years – sparked off some understandable early season celebrations for Connacht's traditional minnows". They retained the title in 2014, defeating Roscommon in the final.

No Leitrim matches were fully cancelled during Covid-19

Leitrim forfeited its Round 6 2025 NFL fixture against Fermanagh due to not having a full team available.

The county's Vocational Schools team have made it to two All-Ireland Vocational Schools Championship Finals, losing to Carlow in 1972 and Donegal in 1995.

In 1977 were the team in Connacht championship to suffer defeat to London and to New York in 2023. Monaghan man Mick Grimes appointed as manager in August 2024.

=== Future ===
In 2027 their opening Connacht championship game will be against London.

== Panel ==
Team as per Leitrim vs London, Round 3 of the Allianz League, 21 February 2022.

No.	Player	Position	Club
1	Brendan Flynn	Goalkeeper	Leitrim Gaels
2	Paddy Maguire	Left corner back	Glencar–Manorhamilton
3	Mark Diffley	Full back	St Mary's, Kiltoghert
4	David Bruen (c)	Right corner back	Leitrim Gaels
5	Shane Quinn	Central left back	Mohill
6	Donal Casey	Centre back	Mohill
7	James Rooney	Right half back	St Mary's, Kiltoghert
8	Donal Wrynn	Midfield	Fenagh
9	Pearce Dolan	Midfield	Aughawillan
10	Mark Plunkett	Left half forward	Aughawillan
11	Keith Beirne	Centre forward	Mohill
12	Darragh Rooney	Right half forward	St Jude's, Dublin/Mohill
13	Ryan O'Rourke	Left corner forward	Naomh Caillin
14	Dean McGovern	Full forward	Ballinamore
15	Riordan O'Rourke	Right corner forward	Fenagh

No.	Player	Position	Club
16	Darren Maxwell	Substitute
17	Conor Farrell	Substitute
18	Cillian McGloain	Substitute
19	Conor Reynolds	Substitute	Fenagh
20	Ciarian Cullen	Substitute	Mohill
21	Jack Heslin	Substitute	Aughawillan
22	Domhnaill Flynn	Substitute	Mohill
23	Paul Keaney	Substitute	Bornacoola
24	Emlyn Mulligan	Substitute	Gortletragh
25	Tom Prior	Substitute	Glencar–Manorhamilton

^{INJ} Player has had an injury which has affected recent involvement with the county team.
^{RET} Player has since retired from the county team.
^{WD} Player has since withdrawn from the county team due to a non-injury issue.

== Management team ==
- Manager: Steven Poacher

== Management ==
Leitrim have a history of appointing "foreign" managers, with Mayo native John O'Mahony proving to be the most successful. O'Mahony led Leitrim to the 1994 Connacht SFC, the county's first in 67 years. This historic breakthrough is widely viewed as the culmination of work begun by his predecessor, P. J. Carroll of Cavan (1989–1992). Carroll is credited with transforming the team's professional standards and physical fitness, leading them to a national title in the 1990 All-Ireland Senior B Football Championship and a Connacht Under-21 Football Championship in 1991.

Other outsiders to manage Leitrim include:

- Seamus Bonner (Donegal)
- Peter McGinnity (Fermanagh)
- Declan McCabe (Monaghan)
- Declan Rowley (Longford)
- Dessie Dolan (Westmeath)
- Mickey Moran (Derry)
- Andy Moran (Mayo)

In late 2024, County Down native Steven Poacher took charge of the senior team, after a brief period where Mickey Graham had initially agreed to the role but stepped down before managing a game.

== Players ==
=== Records ===
- Cathal Flynn: Ireland player 1960, 1961
- Packy McGarty: Ireland player 1957, 1958

=== All Stars ===
Leitrim has 2 All Stars.

1990: Mickey Quinn
1994: Seamus Quinn

- Tailteann Cup Team of the Year (1): 2022

2022: Keith Beirne

== Honours ==
=== National ===
- All-Ireland Senior Football Championship
  - (bronze) Semi-finalists (2): 1927, 1994
- All-Ireland Senior B Football Championship
  - (gold) Winners (1): 1990
- Tailteann Cup
  - Quarter-finalists (1): 2022
- Tommy Murphy Cup
  - (silver) Runners-up (1): 2006
- All-Ireland Minor Football Championship
  - (silver) Runners-up (2): 1945, 1956

=== Provincial ===
- Connacht Senior Football Championship
  - (gold) Winners (2): 1927, 1994
  - (silver) Runners-up (9): 1914, 1949, 1957, 1958, 1959, 1960, 1963, 1967, 2000
- Connacht FBD League
  - (gold) Winners (2): 2013, 2014
- Connacht Junior Football Championship
  - (gold) Winners (7): 1938, 1941, 1946, 1952, 1962, 2004, 2017
- Connacht Under-21 Football Championship
  - (gold) Winners (2): 1977, 1991
  - (silver) Runners-up (4): 1986, 1990, 1998, 2014
- Connacht Minor Football Championship
  - (gold) Winners (3): 1945, 1956, 1998
- Connacht Minor Football League
  - (gold) Winners (1): 1983
