= FBD Holdings =

Irish insurance company

FBD Holdings plc
- Formerly: Farmer Business Developments
- Type: Public limited company
- Traded as: Euronext Dublin: EG7; LSE: FBH; ISEQ 20 component
- ISIN: IE0003290289
- Founded: 1969; 57 years ago
- Headquarters: Dublin, Ireland,
- Key people: Liam Herlihy, Chairman; Tomás Ó Midheach, CEO
- Products: General insurance underwriting
- Revenue: € 358 million (2020)
- Operating income: € 4.8 million (2020)
- Net income: € 4.4 million (2020)
- Website: www.fbdgroup.com

FBD Holdings plc is an Irish insurance company. Its primary listing is on the Euronext Dublin. It is one of Ireland’s largest property and casualty insurers looking after the insurance needs of farmers, private individuals and business owners through its principal subsidiary, FBD Insurance plc. The Group also has financial services operations including a successful life and pensions intermediary. The Company is a holding company incorporated in Ireland. The company is headquartered in Bluebell in Dublin, and it has 34 branch offices throughout Ireland.

== History ==
The company was established in 1969 as Farmer Business Developments offering farm and agri-sector insurance. During the 1970s, the group expanded to include a life insurance broker, a corporate insurance broker and consultancies. In 1988, the various entities were grouped under the umbrella of a holding company, which was subsequently floated on the Irish Stock Exchange.

== Divisions ==
=== FBD insurance ===
FBD offers car, home, farm and business insurance. It is Ireland's largest insurer to the agri-sector and in the top 5 companies in the non-health general insurance market.

=== FBD financial services ===
FBD is an insurance broker offering life and pensions services to its customer base.

== See also ==
- List of companies of Ireland
