= Roscommon county football team =

Gaelic football team

Roscommon
- Sport: Football
- Irish: Ros Comáin
- Nickname(s): The Rossies
- County board: Roscommon GAA
- Manager: Mark Dowd
- Captain: Diarmuid Murtagh
- Home venue(s): Dr Hyde Park, Roscommon

Recent competitive record
- Current All-Ireland status: Connacht W in 2026
- Last championship title: 1944
- Current NFL Division: 1 (4th in 2026)
- Last league title: 1979
First colours	Second colours

The Roscommon county football team represents Roscommon in men's Gaelic football and is governed by Roscommon GAA, the county board of the Gaelic Athletic Association. The team competes in the three major annual inter-county competitions; the All-Ireland Senior Football Championship, the Connacht Senior Football Championship and the National Football League.

Roscommon's home ground is Dr Hyde Park, Roscommon. The team's manager is Mark Dowd.

Roscommon was the third Connacht county both to win an All-Ireland Senior Football Championship (SFC), as well as to appear in the final, following Mayo and Galway. The team last won the Connacht Senior Championship in 2026, the All-Ireland Senior Championship in 1944 and the National League in 1979.

== Kit evolution ==
Black and green until 1935.

== History ==
Roscommon were a glamour team of the 1940s, winning the All-Ireland Senior Football Championship (SFC) on consecutive occasions. The county has produced several prominent figures in GAA history, including two presidents of the Gaelic Athletic Association: Dan O'Rourke (1946–49) and Dr Donal Keenan (1973–76).

Roscommon's rise from Junior status to Senior All-Ireland champions in the four years leading up to 1943 was one of the great romances of its time. In the All Ireland final they drew with Cavan, before winning the replay with two quick goals from Frankie Kinlough and Jack McQuillan. Kinlough scored the goal and Donal Keenan the points the following year when Roscommon beat Kerry. Roscommon were captained by Jamesie Murray from Knockcroghery.

Legend tells how Roscommon lost a six-point lead in the final three minutes of the 1946 All-Ireland Senior Football Championship final against Kerry, Tom Gega O'Connor and Paddy Kennedy scoring the goals. Roscommon were beaten in the replay (Gerry Dolan made one of the greatest saves in Croke Park history against Laois in that year's semi-final). The injured team-captain, Jimmy Murray, was having blood wiped from his face to "look right" for the presentation when Kerry struck for two late equalising goals. Defeats in 1947, 1952 and 1953 semi-finals ended the party.

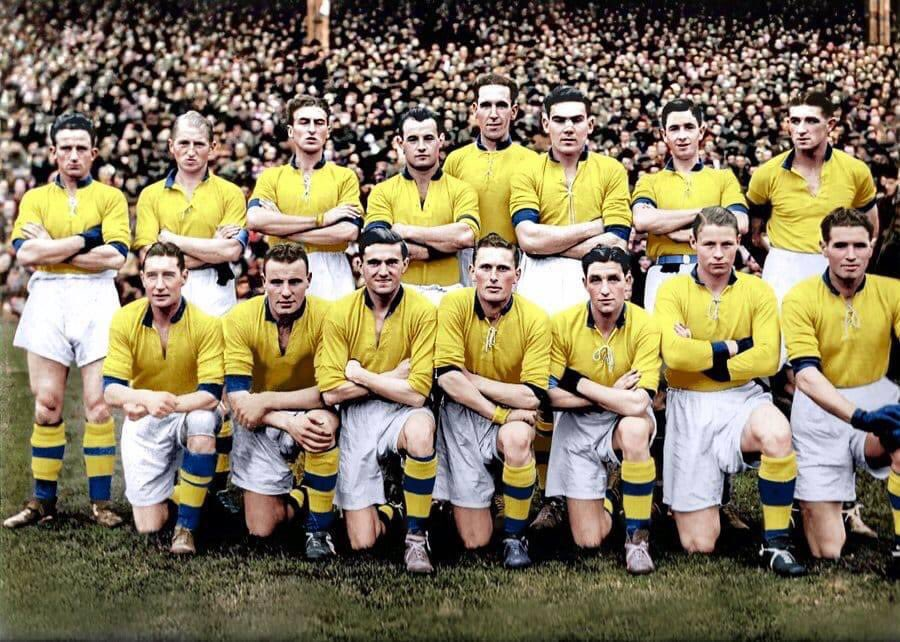
1943 All-Ireland SFC winning team

The 1940s successes were the pinnacle of Roscommon's achievements. They also reached the final in 1962. That year was memorable for they were losing the Connacht final to Galway by 5 points when Roscommon keeper Aidan Brady swung on the crossbar, breaking it in two. During the 15-minute wait to get it replaced, Roscommon moved the great Gerry O'Malley to midfield in a re-organisation and he inspired their comeback to enable them to win the Connacht Championship. However, Kerry, once again, led by the great Mick O'Connell defeated them in the All-Ireland final thanks in no small way to an off-the-ball incident which led to O'Malley being stretchered off very early in the game. Roscommon's next period of success came in the late 1970s when they won 4 Connacht titles on the trot from 77-80. they reached the final in 1980 against Kerry. They looked like causing an upset when John "Jigger" O'Connor's 35th-second goal helped them to an early 1-2 to 0-0 lead, but this was the Kerry team regarded as the greatest in history, and they eventually won by 1-9 to 1-6.

A book, Roscommon Football Legends, commemorating the teams of this era, was launched in December 2016.

A series of minor championships (1981, 1984, 1989 and 1992), and an All-Ireland Under-21 final in 1982, showed the impact of that success and in 1990 and 1991 Roscommon emerged from Connacht again, succumbing to Meath by a single point in the 1991 All Ireland semi-final.

Nine unsuccessful seasons followed before, in 2001, Roscommon regained the Connacht title following a brilliant win and performance over eventual All-Ireland champions Galway and a very dramatic end-of-match victory over Mayo. However, they failed to make any further progress in the 2001 All Ireland Championship and the decade that followed was amongst the least successful in the team's history.

On the field, outside of a run in 2003, the senior team failed to record any notable successes since their 2001 Connacht Championship title win until 2010. The success of the county's Minor team in winning the All-Ireland title in 2006 offered hope, however.

In 2010, Roscommon captured their 20th Senior Connacht football title. In the first round they defeated London in Ruislip 0-14 to 0-6. In the semi-final played in Dr Hyde Park Roscommon beat Leitrim 1-13 to 0-11. In the final played in McHale Park, Roscommon overcame favourites Sligo on a scoreline of 0-14 to 0-13. Roscommon were subsequently beaten in the All-Ireland Quarter-final in Croke Park by Cork 1-16 to 0-10.

Roscommon made their return to Division 1 of the National Football League in 2016 and enjoyed a successful campaign picking up wins against Kerry, Cork, Donegal and Down, before losing a League semi-final to Kerry at Croke Park. However, they endured a disappointing Championship. A draw against Galway in the Connacht Final in terrible conditions brought them to a replay in Castlebar, where Roscommon went on to lose by 11 points. They exited the All-Ireland Championship with a 4th round Qualifier loss to Clare.

Roscommon were subsequently relegated from Division 1 of the League in 2017 after losing all but 1 of their games. In 2018 Roscommon were promoted back to Division 1 by topping the Division 2 group and winning the Division 2 title in Croke Park against Cavan.

Roscommon beat Galway in the 2017 Connacht Senior Football Championship final on a scoreline of 2-15 to 0-12. It was Roscommon's 23rd Connacht SFC final win, a first since 2010 and a first at Pearse Stadium since 1978.

On 5 September 2018 after three years in charge Kevin McStay stepped down as Roscommon manager. "I feel I have brought the team as far as I can at this stage and a new voice and direction is now required", he said on his departure. Anthony Cunningham, former Galway hurler and hurling manager took over from McStay. Roscommon won the Connacht title in Cunningham's maiden year at the helm, defeating Galway in Salthill to claim their 23rd JJ Nestor Cup.

Galway lost the 2019 Connacht SFC final to Roscommon at Pearse Stadium, despite Roscommon being behind by five points at half-time.

=== 2025 resume on overseas ===
Roscommon's 2020 Connacht SFC quarter-final game against London did not occur due to COVID-19 with New York in 2021 also not occurring. On Saturday 5 April 2025, Roscommon beat London by 2-26 to 0-13 easier win then previous 3 fixtures in 2005, 2010 and 2015 there margin was close. On Sunday 12 April 2026, Roscommon beat New York by 5-22 to 1-10 their easiest win since they hosted London in 1980 there was 10 points in the 2001 fixture, 2006 fixture 8 points, 2011 fixture 16 points and 2016 fixture had just 1 point. If overseas games remain on rotation next London fixture will be in 2030 and New York in 2031.

== Support ==
A voluntary fundraising body, Club Rossie, exists.

== Panel ==
Team as per Roscommon vs Mayo in the 2026 Connacht Senior Football Championship semi-final, 26 April 2026

No.	Player	Position	Club
1	Conor Carroll	Goalkeeper	St Brigid's
2	Patrick Gavin	Right corner-back	Clann na nGael
3	Caelim Keogh	Full-back	Pádraig Pearses
4	Eoin McCormack	Left corner-back	St. Dominic's
5	Eoin Ward	Right half-back	Fuerty
6	Ronan Daly	Centre-back	Pádraig Pearses
7	Senan Lambe	Left half-back	Roscommon Gaels
8	Keith Doyle	Midfield	St. Dominic's
9	Conor Ryan	Midfield	Pádraig Pearses
10	Dylan Ruane	Right half-forward	Michael Glaveys
11	Enda Smith	Centre-forward	Boyle
12	Darragh Heneghan	Left half-forward	Michael Glaveys
13	Diarmuid Murtagh (c)	Right corner-forward	St Faithleach's
14	Colm Neary	Full-forward	Strokestown
15	Robert Heneghan	Left corner-forward	Michael Glaveys

No.	Player	Position	Club
16	Aaron Brady	Substitute	Elphin
17	Niall Higgins	Substitute	Navan O'Mahonys
18	Robbie Dolan	Substitute	St Brigid's
19	Shane Cunnane	Substitute	St Brigid's
20	Jack Duggan	Substitute	Clonguish
21	Paul Carey	Substitute	Pádraig Pearses
22	Conor Hand	Substitute	St Brigid's
23	Ultan Harney	Substitute	Clann na nGael
24	Cian McKeon	Substitute	Boyle
25	Eoin Colleran	Substitute	Pádraig Pearses
26	Ciarán Lennon	Substitute	Clann na nGael

== Management team ==
As of May 2026:

- Manager: Mark Dowd
- Selectors: John Rogers, Iain Daly
- Coach: Jason Sherlock

== Managerial history ==
Roscommon have a recent history of appointing "non-native" managers, doing so on several occasions in the 21st century. The first of those, John Tobin, won a Connacht SFC in 2001 and latter two McStay and Cunningham won Connacht senior titles for Roscommon in 2017 and 2019.

Date Appointed	Season(s)	Name	Origin
1988	1988–1992	Martin McDermott	St Brigid's
1993	1993–1994	Dermot Earley	Michael Glavey's
1995	1995–1997	Donie Shine	Clann na nGael
1998	1998–2000	Gay Sheerin	St Ronan's
2001	2001–2002	John Tobin	
2003	2003–2004	Tommy Carr	
2005	2005	Val Daly	
7 November 2005	2006–2008	John Maughan	
2 April 2008	2008	Paul Earley	Michael Glavey's
20 April 2008	2008	Michael Ryan	Roscommon Gaels
18 September 2008	2009–2011	Fergal O'Donnell	Roscommon Gaels
17 November 2011	2012	Des Newton	Shannon Gaels
8 November 2012	2013–2015	John Evans	
5 October 2015	2016	Kevin McStay	
5 October 2015	2016	Fergal O'Donnell (2)	Roscommon Gaels
19 October 2016	2017–2018	Kevin McStay^{(n)}	
8 November 2018	2019–2022	Anthony Cunningham	
26 October 2022	2023–2025	Davy Burke	
16 August 2025	2026–	Mark Dowd	Strokestown

(n) = McStay continued as manager by himself after O'Donnell's departure.

== Players ==
=== Notable players ===
- Karol Mannion
- Fergal O'Donnell, 2001 Connacht SFC-winning captain
- Donie Smith

=== Records ===
- Dermot Earley Snr is the team's top scorer in National Football League history, finishing his career with 17–316 (367) in that competition.
- As of 2019, a set of brothers had played in all 21 of Roscommon's winning Connacht SFC finals.

=== Team of the Millennium ===
- 1 Aidan Brady
- 2 Harry Keegan
- 3 Pat Lindsay
- 4 Bill Jackson
- 5 Brendan Lynch
- 6 Bill Carlos
- 7 Phelim Murray
- 8 Eamon Boland
- 9 Gerry O'Malley
- 10 Dermot Earley
- 11 Jimmy Murray
- 12 Donal Keenan
- 13 Tony McManus
- 14 Jack McQuillan
- 15 John Joe Nerney

== Competitive record ==
=== All-Ireland Senior Football Championship ===
This is Roscommon's record in All-Ireland SFC finals. Bold denotes a year in which the team won the competition.

Year	Venue	Result	Attendance
**1943**	Croke Park	Roscommon 2–7 Cavan 2–2	47,193
**1944**	Croke Park	Roscommon 1–9 Kerry 2–4	79,245
1946	Croke Park	Kerry 2–8 Roscommon 0–10	65,661
1962	Croke Park	Kerry 1–12 Roscommon 1–6	75,771
1980	Croke Park	Kerry 1–9 Roscommon 1–6	63,854

=== National Football League ===
This is Roscommon's record in National Football League finals. Bold denotes a year in which the team won the competition.

Year	Venue	Winning team	Score	Losing team
1974	Croke Park	Kerry	0–14 v 0–8	Roscommon
**1979**	Croke Park	Roscommon	0–15 v 1–3	Cork
1981	Croke Park	Galway	1–11 v 1–3	Roscommon

Roscommon's only National Football League title win is from 1978–79, with Tom Heneghan as player–manager. Below is the team that defeated Cork in the final.

- 1 John McDermott
- 2 Seamus Tighe
- 3 Pat Lindsay
- 4 Tom Heneghan
- 5 Gerry Fitzmaurice
- 6 Tom Donnellan
- 7 Danny Murray (c)
- 8 Dermot Earley Snr
- 9 Seamus Hayden
- 10 Tony McManus
- 11 John O'Gara
- 12 Sean Kilbride
- 13 Michael Finneran
- 14 Mickey Freyne
- 15 Éamonn McManus

Sub used: Richie O'Beirne for Heneghan

== Rivalries ==
- Dublin–Roscommon Gaelic football rivalry
- Galway–Roscommon Gaelic football rivalry
- Mayo–Roscommon Gaelic football rivalry
- Meath–Roscommon Gaelic football rivalry

== Honours ==
=== National ===
- All-Ireland Senior Football Championship
  - (gold) Winners (2): 1943, 1944
  - (silver) Runners-up (3): 1946, 1962, 1980
- National Football League
  - (gold) Winners (1): 1978–79
  - (silver) Runners-up (2): 1973–74, 1980–81
- National Football League Division Two
  - (gold) Winners (4): 2015, 2018, 2020, 2022
- National Football League Division Three
  - (gold) Winners (1): 2014
- All-Ireland Junior Football Championship
  - (gold) Winners (2): 1940, 2000
- All-Ireland Under-21/Under-20 Football Championship
  - (gold) Winners (2): 1966, 1978
- All-Ireland Minor Football Championship
  - (gold) Winners (4): 1939, 1941, 1951, 2006

=== Provincial ===
- Connacht Senior Football Championship
  - (gold) Winners (25): 1892, 1903, 1905, 1912, 1914, 1943, 1944, 1946, 1947, 1952, 1953, 1961, 1962, 1972, 1977, 1978, 1979, 1980, 1990, 1991, 2001, 2010, 2017, 2019, 2026
  - (silver) Runners-up (25): 1906, 1911, 1915, 1916, 1919, 1925, 1931, 1941, 1942, 1950, 1955, 1970, 1974, 1976, 1985, 1986, 1988, 1989, 1992, 1993, 1998, 2011, 2016, 2018, 2022
- Connacht FBD League
  - (gold) Winners (5): 1997, 1999, 2015, 2018 2019
- Connacht Junior Football Championship 11
  - (gold) Winners (11): 1929 (awarded), 1932, 1939, 1940, 1959, 1964, 1999, 2000, 2006, 2008, 2009
- Connacht Under-21/Under-20 Football Championship
  - (gold) Winners (10): 1966, 1969, 1978, 1982, 1999, 2010, 2012, 2014, 2015, 2026
- Connacht Minor Football Championship
  - (gold) Winners (16): 1939, 1941, 1951, 1965, 1967, 1975, 1981, 1984, 1989, 1992, 2006, 2011, 2012, 2020, 2025, 2026
