= Commissioners in Lunacy for Ireland =

Irish statutory corporation

The Commissioners in Lunacy for Ireland or Lunacy Commission for Ireland were a public body established by the Lunacy (Ireland) Act 1821 to oversee asylums and the welfare of mentally ill people in Ireland.

== Establishment ==
The Board of Commissioners in Lunacy for Ireland, more strictly known as the "Commission of General Control and Correspondence", was established in 1821 by the Lunacy (Ireland) Act 1821. The commission consisted of four doctors and four lay members. It was responsible for designating the districts to be served by the asylums, selecting the locations and approving the designs.

== Asylums commissioned ==
The Eglinton Asylum in Cork and the Richmond Asylum in Dublin existed at the time the legislation was enacted and were incorporated into the new district asylum system as the Cork Asylum and the Dublin Asylum in 1830 and 1845 respectively. The new asylums that were commissioned under the auspices of the Commissioners in Lunacy for Ireland included:

- Antrim Asylum, 1899
- Armagh Asylum, 1825
- Connacht Asylum, 1833
- Belfast Asylum, 1829
- Carlow Asylum, 1832
- Castlebar Asylum, 1866
- Clonmel Asylum, 1835
- Donegal Asylum, 1866
- Down Asylum, 1869
- Ennis Asylum, 1868
- Enniscorthy Asylum, 1868
- Killarney Asylum, 1852
- Kilkenny Asylum, 1852
- Limerick Asylum, 1827
- Londonderry Asylum, 1829
- Maryborough Asylum, 1833
- Monaghan Asylum, 1869
- Mullingar Asylum 1855
- Omagh Asylum, 1853
- Portrane Asylum, 1903
- Sligo Asylum, 1855
- Waterford Asylum, 1835

== See also ==
- Commissioners in Lunacy (for England and Wales)
- Commissioners in Lunacy for Scotland
