= List of hospitals in the Republic of Ireland =

This is a list of hospitals in the Republic of Ireland.

== Connacht ==
=== County Galway & Galway City ===
- Bon Secours Hospital, Galway
- Galway Clinic, Galway
- Merlin Park University Hospital, Galway
- Portiuncula University Hospital, Ballinasloe
- University Hospital Galway, Galway

=== County Leitrim ===
- Our Lady's Hospital, Manorhamilton
- St Patricks Community Hospital, Carrick-on-Shannon

=== County Mayo ===
- Mayo University Hospital, Castlebar
- Ballina District Hospital, Ballina
- Swinford District Hospital, Swinford
- Belmullet District Hospital, Belmullet
- Sacred Heart Hospital, Castlebar

=== County Roscommon ===
- Roscommon University Hospital, Roscommon
- Sacred Heart Hospital, Roscommon

=== County Sligo ===
- Sligo University Hospital, Sligo
- St. John's Hospital, Sligo
- Kingsbridge Private Hospital, Sligo

== Leinster ==
=== County Carlow ===
- St. Dympna's Hospital

=== County Dublin & Dublin City ===
- Beacon Hospital
- Beaumont Hospital, Dublin
- Blackrock Clinic, Blackrock
- Bloomfield Care Centre, Rathfarnham
- Bon Secours Hospital, Dublin
- Cappagh National Orthopaedic Hospital, Finglas
- Central Mental Hospital, Dundrum
- Cherry Orchard Hospital, Ballyfermot
- Clonskeagh Hospital, Clonskeagh
- Coombe Women & Infants University Hospital, Dolphin's Barn
- Hermitage Clinic, Lucan, Dublin
- Highfield Hospital, Whitehall
- Incorporated Orthopaedic Hospital of Ireland, Clontarf
- Connolly Hospital, Blanchardstown
- Dublin Dental University Hospital, Lincoln Place
- Leopardstown Park Hospital, Foxrock
- Mater Misericordiae University Hospital, Dublin
- Mater Private Hospital, Eccles Street
- Mount Carmel Community Hospital, Churchtown, Dublin
- National Maternity Hospital, Holles Street
- National Rehabilitation Hospital, Dún Laoghaire
- Our Lady's Children's Hospital, Crumlin
- Peamount Hospital, Newcastle
- The Rotunda Maternity Hospital
- Royal City of Dublin Hospital, Baggot Street
- The Royal Hospital, Donnybrook
- Royal Victoria Eye and Ear Hospital, Adelaide Road
- Sports Surgery Clinic, Santry, Dublin
- St. Brendan's Hospital, Dublin
- St Bricin's Military Hospital, Arbour Hill
- St. Columcille's Hospital, Loughlinstown
- St. Edmundsbury Hospital, Lucan, Dublin
- St. Ita's Hospital, Portrane
- St. James's Hospital, Rialto
- St. John of God Hospital, Stillorgan, Stillorgan, Dún Laoghaire–Rathdown
- St. Joseph's Hospital, Dublin
- St. Loman's Hospital, Palmerstown
- St. Luke's Hospital, Rathgar
- St. Mary's Hospital (Baldoyle), Baldoyle
- St. Mary's Hospital (Phoenix Park), Phoenix Park
- St. Michael's Hospital, Dún Laoghaire
- St Patrick's University Hospital, Dublin 8
- St. Paul's Hospital, Dublin
- St. Vincent's Hospital, Fairview
- St. Vincent's Private Hospital, Merrion Road
- St. Vincent's University Hospital Merrion road
- Simpson's Hospital, Dundrum
- Tallaght University Hospital, Tallaght
- Temple Street Children's University Hospital

=== County Kildare ===
- Naas General Hospital, Naas
- St. Vincent's Hospital, Athy
- UPMC Kildare, Clane

=== County Kilkenny ===
- Aut Even Hospital, Kilkenny
- Castlecomer District Hospital, Castlecomer
- Kilcreene Orthopaedic Hospital, Kilcreene
- St. Canice's Hospital, Kilkenny
- St. Luke's General Hospital, Kilkenny

=== County Laois ===
- Midland Regional Hospital, Portlaoise
- St. Fintan's Hospital, Portlaoise

=== County Louth ===
- Our Lady of Lourdes Hospital, Drogheda
- Louth County Hospital, Dundalk

=== County Meath ===
- Our Lady's Hospital, Navan
- St. Joseph's Hospital, Trim

=== County Offaly ===
- Birr District Hospital, Birr
- Midland Regional Hospital, Tullamore

=== County Westmeath ===
- Midland Regional Hospital, Mullingar
- St. Loman's Hospital, Mullingar
- St. Mary's Hospital (Mullingar), Mullingar
- Saint Francis Private Hospital, Mullingar

=== County Wexford ===
- Ely Hospital, Wexford
- Gorey District Hospital, Gorey
- New Houghton Hospital, New Ross
- John's Hospital, Enniscorthy
- Wexford General Hospital, Wexford

=== County Wicklow ===
- Newcastle Hospital, Newtownmountkennedy

== Munster ==
=== County Clare ===
- Ennis Hospital
- St. Johns Hospital, Ennis
- Cahercalla Hospice & Private Hospital, Ennis

=== County Cork & Cork City ===
- Bandon Community Hospital, Bandon
- Bantry General Hospital, Bantry
- Bon Secours Hospital, Cork
- Mater Private Hospital, Cork
- Cork University Hospital, Cork
- Cork University Maternity Hospital, Cork
- Erinville Hospital, Cork
- Mallow General Hospital, Mallow
- Mater Private
- Marymount Hospital, Cork
- Mercy University Hospital, Cork
- Shanakiel Hospital, Cork
- South Infirmary-Victoria University Hospital, Cork
- St. Anthony's Hospital, Dunmanway
- St. Finbarr's Hospital, Cork
- St. Mary's Health Campus, Cork
- St. Patrick's Hospital, Fermoy
- St. Stephen's Hospital, Glanmire, Cork
- Tabor Lodge, Tabor

=== County Kerry ===
- Bon Secours Hospital, Tralee
- Cahersiveen Community Hospital (St. Anne's), Cahersiveen
- Dingle Community Hospital (St. Elizabeth's), Dingle
- Kenmare Community Hospital, Kenmare
- Killarney Community Hospital, Killarney
- Listowel Community Hospital, Listowel
- University Hospital Kerry, Tralee

=== County Limerick & Limerick City ===
- Bon Secours Hospital, Limerick
- Croom Hospital, Croom
- St. Camillus' Geriatric Hospital, Limerick
- St. John's Hospital, Limerick
- St. Joseph's Hospital, Limerick
- University Hospital Limerick
- University Maternity Hospital, Limerick

=== County Tipperary ===
- Nenagh Hospital
- St. Brigid's District Hospital, Carrick-on-Suir
- Tipperary University Hospital, Clonmel

=== County Waterford & Waterford City ===
- St. Joseph's Hospital, Dungarvan
- St. Otteran's Hospital, Waterford
- St. Vincent's District Hospital, Dungarvan
- University Hospital Waterford, Waterford
- UPMC Whitfield Hospital, Waterford

== Ulster ==
=== County Cavan ===
- Cavan General Hospital

=== County Donegal ===
- Rock Hospital Ballyshannon
- Buncrana Community Hospital,
- Carndonagh Community Hospital, Carndonagh
- Donegal Community Hospital, Donegal
- Dungloe Community Hospital, Dungloe
- Killybegs Community Hospital, Killybegs
- Letterkenny University Hospital, Letterkenny
- Lifford Community Hospital, Lifford

=== County Monaghan ===
- Monaghan Hospital, Monaghan
