= Cork University Hospital Group =

Hospital network in County Cork, Ireland

Cork University Hospital Group was a hospital network in County Cork, Ireland. It consisted of:

- Cork University Hospital
- Mallow General Hospital
- St. Mary's Health Campus

The hospitals are now part of a revised hospital group structure, with all three hospitals becoming part of the South/Southwest Hospital Group.

== See also ==
- List of hospitals in Ireland
