= Mid-Western Regional Hospital =

Mid-Western Regional Hospital may refer to various hospitals in Ireland:

- Mid-Western Regional Hospital, Limerick
- Mid-Western Regional Hospital, Ennis
- Mid-Western Regional Hospital, Nenagh
