= Our Lady's Hospital =

Our Lady's Hospital may refer to:

in Ireland

- Our Lady's Hospital, Cork, a psychiatric hospital in County Cork
- Our Lady's Hospital, Ennis, a psychiatric hospital in County Clare
- Our Lady's Hospital, Manorhamilton, a general hospital in County Leitrim
- Our Lady's Hospital, Navan, a general hospital in County Meath
- Our Lady's Children's Hospital, Crumlin, a paediatric hospital in Dublin
