= Noel Reynolds =

Noel Reynolds may refer to:

- Noel Reynolds (priest) (died 2002), Irish Catholic priest
- Noel B. Reynolds (born 1941), American political scientist
