= National Rehabilitation Hospital =

- MedStar National Rehabilitation Hospital in Washington D.C.
- National Rehabilitation Hospital (Dublin) in Ireland
