= Noel Walsh =

Gaelic football figure (1935–2020)

Lieutenant colonel Noel Walsh
- Nollaig Breathnach
- Born: Noel Walsh; 29 December 1935; Milltown Malbay, County Clare, Ireland
- Died: 29 April 2020 (aged 84); Ennis General Hospital, Ireland
- Spouse: Ursula
- Military career
- Allegiance: Clare
- Service years: 19??–19??
- Rank: Lieutenant colonel (OF-4)
- Conflicts: Munster Council: until 1990; Presidency of the Gaelic Athletic Association: 1999, 2002

Noel Walsh (29 December 1935 – 29 April 2020) was an Irish Gaelic footballer, administrator, selector, manager and member of the Defence Forces. As a selector and manager, he worked with the Clare county team. As a provincial administrator he was pivotal in establishing an open draw in the Munster Senior Football Championship. As a national administrator he was pivotal in the overturning of the Gaelic Athletic Association's Rule 42, the introduction of the All-Ireland Qualifiers and the spread of floodlights to club and county grounds. At his death he was remembered locally and nationally as one of the sport's most progressive administrators. He was often referred to as "Mr Clare Football".

== Early life ==
Patrick Hillery's father, later the sixth President of Ireland, delivered Noel upstairs in the family-owned pub. Walsh played golf as a young man, had membership of Spanish Point and Lahinch Golf Clubs and qualified for the South of Ireland championship several times, while during the 1960s, he won a President's Prize at Lahinch Golf Club. Though he moved to Limerick, he still held his allegiance to Clare.

== Career ==
He was part of the Defence Forces, achieving the rank of lieutenant colonel.

=== Player ===
Walsh played for the Milltown Malbay club. With them he twice won the Clare Senior Football Championship, in 1953 and 1959. He played for the Clare county team at minor and junior grades.

=== Selector ===
Walsh spent twenty years as a selector for the Clare football team at senior level. One of these years was 1992, when Clare won the Munster Senior Football Championship. It was the first time since 1935 (and still the last time when Walsh died) that the duopoly of Cork–Kerry had been broken. Walsh had been responsible for bringing the winning manager John Maughan to Clare. He was a Clare selector at all football grades.

Walsh was also a selector for the Munster football team.

=== Manager ===
Walsh also managed the Clare football team at senior level for three terms.

=== Administrator ===
Walsh was secretary and chairman of his club Milltown Malbay. He was also chairman of Clare Bórd na bPáirc. Walsh spent eight years as Clare's County Board delegate to the Munster Council.

He served as vice-chairman of the Munster Council from 1992 and became chairman of the Munster Council in 1995, after Tom Boland. Walsh was chairman of the Munster Council until March 1998. He presented the Munster Cup to Anthony Daly when Clare won the Munster Senior Hurling Championship for the first time in 63 years in 1995.

Walsh advocated an open draw for the Munster Senior Football Championship (Cork and Kerry tended to be seeded). He persevered with this, even when set back by opposition to the idea. He was eventually successful. This was in 1990, two years before Clare broke the duopoly, Limerick having had the first attempt in a narrow loss to Kerry in the 1991 Munster Senior Football Championship Final.

Walsh was chairman of several committees, including the Coaching and Games Development Committee, the Provincial Football Development Committee and the Amateur Status Committee. He was a member of various workgroups, including the Disciplinary Rules Workgroup, the Féile Peil na nÓg Workgroup and the Railway Cup Workgroup. He spent three years as a member of the Management Committee and Central Council. His chairing of the Football Development Committee led to the introduction of the All-Ireland Qualifiers.

Other work included the introduction of floodlights to GAA stadiums and advocacy on the part of the Railway Cup. When chairman of the Munster Council, Walsh had a pilot project for floodlights at Tralee's Austin Stack Park which "became a template for every county and club ground in the country".

Joe McDonagh, when GAA president, appointed Walsh as chairman of the National Football Development Committee. Walsh himself twice ran for the presidency and was elected a GAA trustee in 2000. Seán McCague beat him into third place in the presidential election of 1999. Walsh then lost to Seán Kelly in the presidential election of 2002.

Walsh wanted Croke Park opened up to other sports. Walsh credited the original motion to Tom Kenoy of Roscommon but took up the task himself when the motion lost by two-thirds of one vote — 176 to 89. Rule 42 was eventually amended at the 2005 GAA Congress to permit the opening of Croke Park. Walsh via his club brought a motion to the 2015 GAA Congress asking for all county grounds to be opened to other sports. This time he did not succeed. However, Walsh's motion later helped justify holding a tribute association football match to Liam Miller at Páirc Uí Chaoimh.

== Death ==
He died at Ennis General Hospital on 29 April 2020. He was 84 years of age. The cause was pneumonia resulting from COVID-19 during the COVID-19 pandemic in the Republic of Ireland. He was survived by his wife Ursula, two daughters, a son and three grandchildren.
