= Finbarr O'Connell =

- Born: 21 May 1960 (age 65); Manorhamilton, County Leitrim
- Occupations: Insolvency Practitioner; Team Principal of Caterham F1 Team (2014)

Finbarr Thomas O'Connell (born 21 May 1960 in Manorhamilton, Ireland) is an Irish accountant and insolvency practitioner.

== Career ==
=== Insolvency and accountancy ===
O'Connell is a partner for London based wealth management firm, Evelyn Partners. He is based in London, and operates as a partner within restructuring and recovery. He is a qualified, chartered accountant.

=== Caterham F1 Team ===
During his time with Smith & Williamson, O'Connell led the team that took on the administration of Caterham Sports Limited. This included the Formula One team, where he became the de facto team principal. Whilst the team were unable to race at the United States and Brazilian Grand Prix, he set out to simultaneously raise funds to allow the team to race whilst attempting to secure a buyer. To raise the necessary funding, Caterham launched a crowdfunding effort on the, aiming to raise £2.35m. The funding was required if the team was to compete at the final race of the season, the Abu Dhabi Grand Prix. It was successful in achieving this, with O'Connell attending the Grand Prix in official capacity as Team Principal.
