= Gurranabraher =

Gurranabraher Garrán na mBráthar
- Suburb
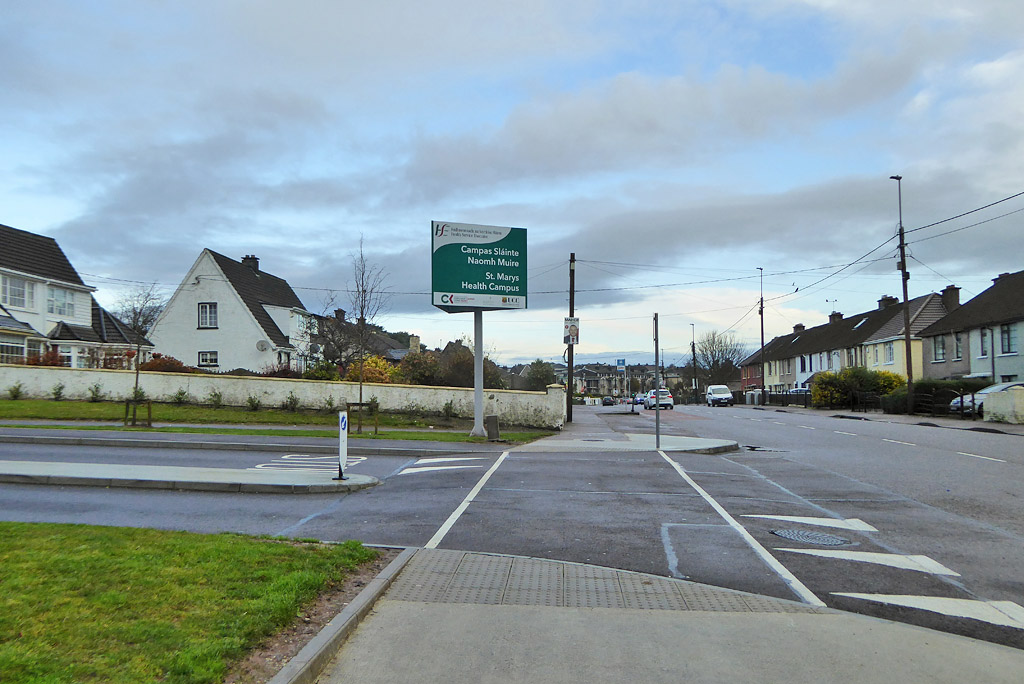
- Entrance to St. Mary's Health Campus on Bakers Road

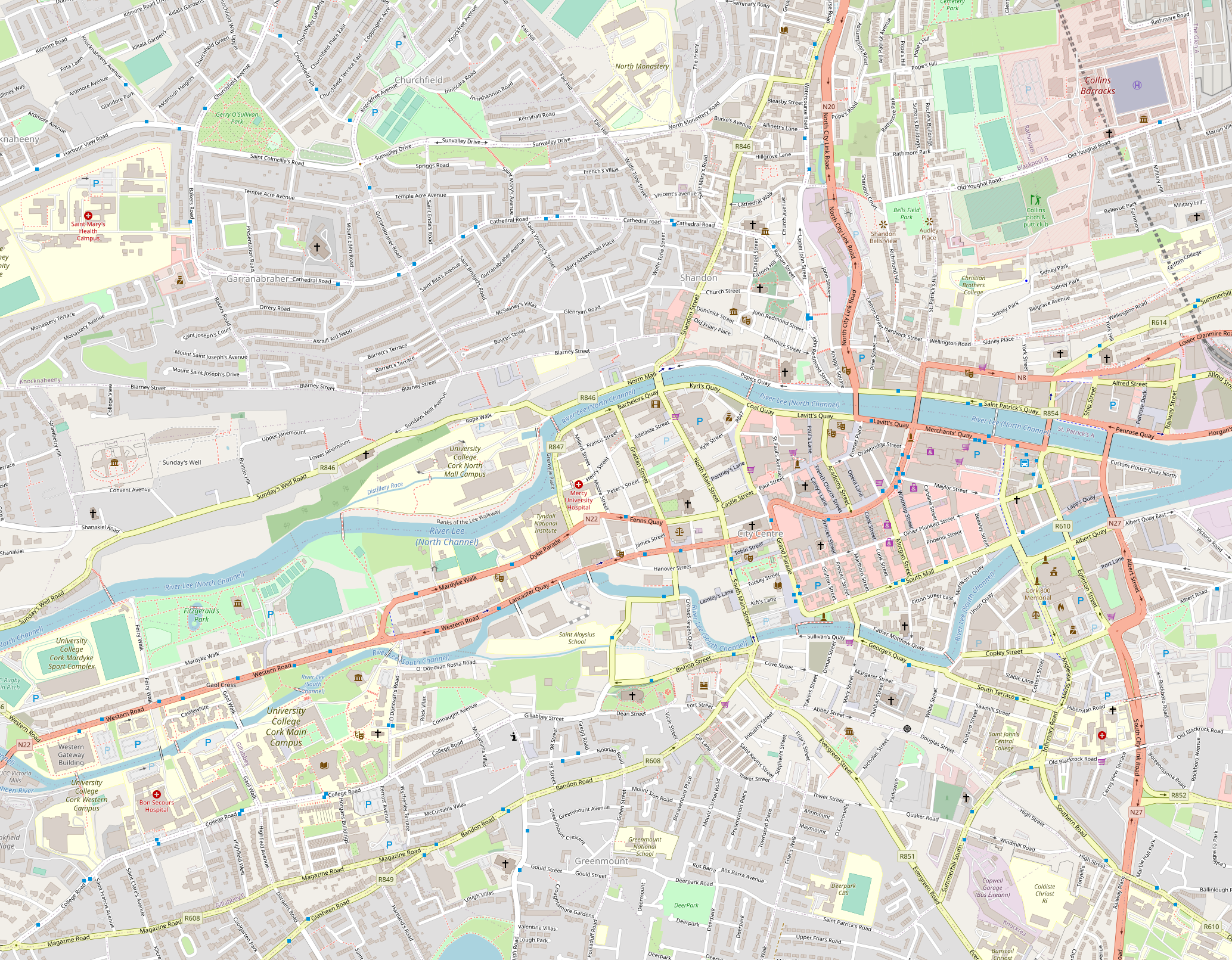
- Location in Cork City
- Coordinates: 51°54′13″N 8°29′44″W
- Country: Ireland
- Province: Munster
- County: County Cork
- Administrative area: Cork
- Time zone: UTC+0 (WET)
  - Summer (DST): UTC-1 (IST (WEST))

Gurranabraher (Irish: Garrán na mBráthar, meaning 'grove of the brothers') is a residential suburb on the north western side of Cork City. Its bounds range from the North Cathedral to Bakers Road to Blarney Street. Gurranabraher is located in the Dáil constituency of Cork North-Central, and the Cork City Council local electoral area of Cork City North West.

== Amenities ==
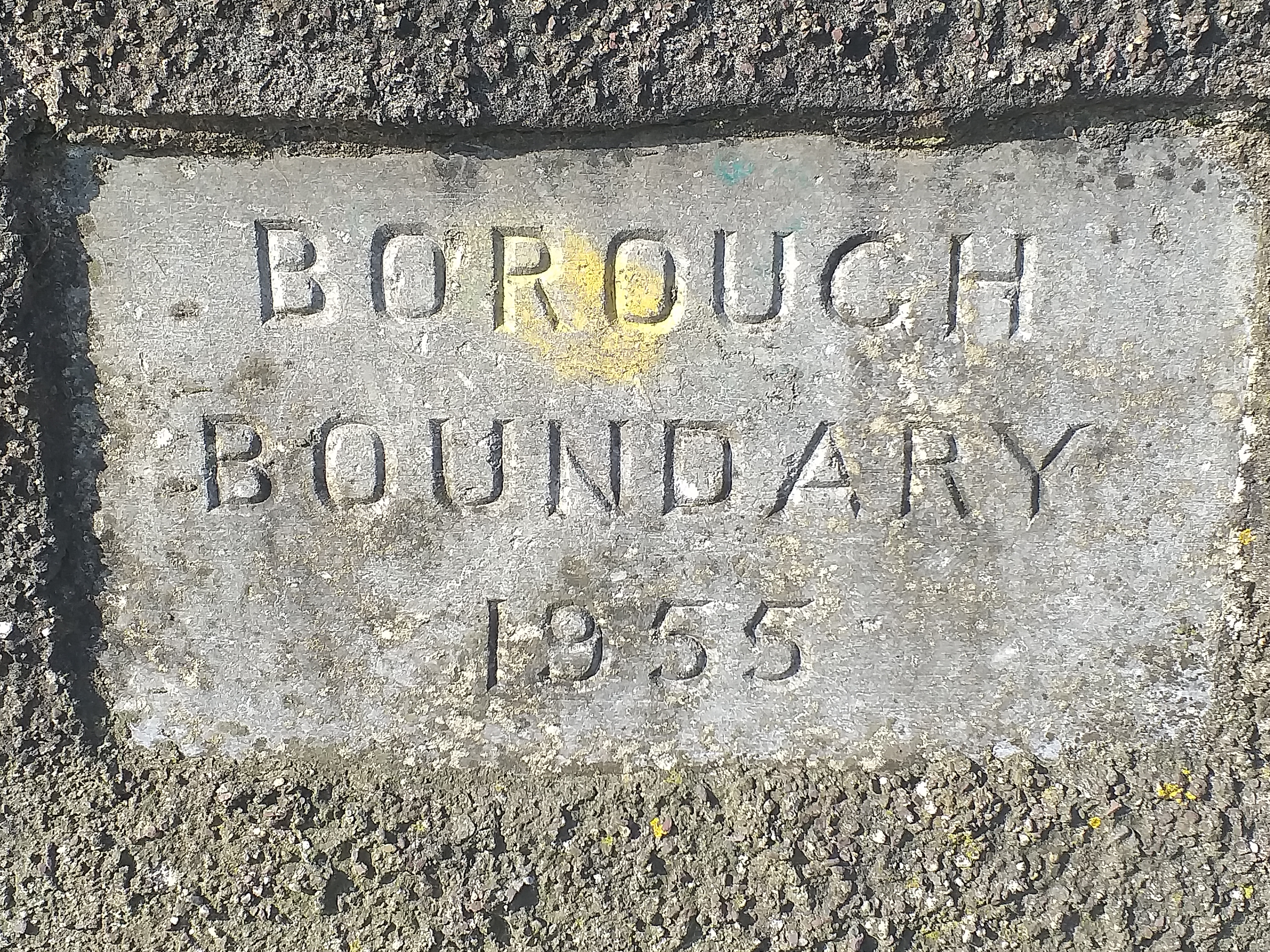
Suburb boundary on Bakers Road

The local Roman Catholic church, the Church of the Ascension, was opened in 1955 and acts as the parish for both Gurranbraher and Churchfield. The area is also serviced by a Garda station, a primary care centre, and a credit union. There are also a number of community initiatives based in the parochial hall.

There is a recreational area in Jerry O'Sullivan Park on St. Colmcille's Road. A community gardening project adjoins this park.

Scoil Padre Pio in Churchfield, and Blarney Street C.B.S in Gurranbraher are two local primary schools. There are no secondary schools within Gurranabraher, with the North Monastery, St. Vincent's Secondary School and the Nano Nagle College (formerly North Presentation Secondary School) being the closest.

St. Mary's Health Campus, run by the Mercy University Hospital, is the location of an urgent care centre in Gurranabraher.

Bus services which serve the area include Bus Éireann route 201 (orbital to CIT and CUH) and route 202 (Apple campus to Mahon Point).

== Sport ==
The local Gaelic Athletic Association team is St. Vincent's Hurling and Football club. Previously in the area there were Gurranabraher (football) and Shandon Rovers (hurling) clubs (Seandún GAA). St. Mary's A.F.C was founded by the North Cathedral, but now play their games in Kilcully. Blue Demons basketball team was founded in the area and played in the local parochial hall. Sunnyside Boxing Club (club of three former Olympians) also trains in the parochial hall. Siam Warriors Thai Boxing Club trains next to the Crucible Snooker club off the Glen Ryan Road.

== Notable residents ==
- Ricky Dineen (Churchfield), guitarist with the early 1980s post-punk band Five Go Down to the Sea?
- Pat Falvey, mountaineer and first Irish man to complete the Seven Summits Challenge
- Bernard Geary (1934-2023), composer and pianist, was born in Gurranabraher, where his parents ran a grocery shop.
- Thomas Gould, Sinn Féin T.D. for Cork North Central
- Frank O'Connor, writer who was born on Douglas Street, lived on Blarney Street until he was 5, before moving to Dillon's Cross
