= St. John of God Hospital, Stillorgan =

Hospital in Stillorgan, Republic of Ireland

St John of God University Hospital, Stillorgan
- St John of God Health Care

Geography
- Location: Stillorgan, Dublin, Ireland
- Coordinates: 53.284777°N 6.192206°W

Organisation
- Type: Specialist
- Religious affiliation: Roman Catholic
- Affiliated university: Royal College of Psychiatrists, Irish College of Psychiatrists, University College Dublin, University of Limerick, Trinity College Dublin, Dublin City University, Royal College of Surgeons

Services
- Beds: 183
- Speciality: Psychiatric hospital

History
- Opened: 1882

Links
- Website: www.stjohnofgodhospital.ie
- Lists: Hospitals in the Republic of Ireland

St. John of God University Hospital is a psychiatric teaching hospital located in Stillorgan, Dublin, Ireland. The hospital is part of the St. John of God Hospitaller Service Group, which is part of the international St. John of God Order (also known as the Brothers Hospitallers and the Hospitaller Brothers of St. John of God) that has more than 300 care centres in more than 50 countries. Hospitality, compassion, excellence, justice, and respect are the values of every centre of the St. John of God Order.

== History ==
John Cidade was the founder of the Hospitaller Brothers of St. John of God. During his life he was hospitalized for a period of time for reasons related to his mental health. After he was discharged John began to care for those in need. With the help of donors and people to help him look after the sick, John set up shelters and a hospital. The religious order of the Brothers Hospitallers was officially approved by Pope Pius V in 1572. The religious order and hospitals founded by the order have spread all over the world. St. John of God was canonized (confirmed to be a saint) by Pope Alexander VIII in 1690. John of God also inspired the creation of the Sisters of St. John of God in Wexford, Ireland in 1871. Today, the headquarters of the St. John of God organization is in Rome.

The St John of God University Hospital, Stillorgan was founded in 1882 with the goal of helping those with mental health problems. This was the first of the St. John of God organizations to be founded in Ireland, but since then many more organizations from the order have popped up across the country. The organizations' centres in Ireland include hospitals, clinics, schools, nursing homes, and more for Irish people experiencing homelessness, mental health conditions, intellectual disability, learning disability, dementia, physical disability, and life limiting conditions.

On 1 January 2019, all responsibilities that had been carried out by the Hospitaller Order of Saint John of God in Ireland were taken over by the St. John of God Hospitaller Service Group ("SJOG HSG") due to a decreasing number of brothers in the order. However, the health care centres still report to the headquarters of the St. John of God organization in Rome. The SJOG HSG provides services in Malawi, Ireland, and Britain. The group works in partnership with governments, educational authorities, health authorities, and volunteer agencies in each of the countries they provide services for.

== Services ==
St John of God University Hospital, Stillorgan has 183 in-patient beds and provides services for patients dealing with Substance Misuse, Psychotic Disorders, Eating Disorders, Adolescent Psychiatric Disorders, and Later Life Psychiatric Disorders. Outpatient and inpatient services are available at the hospital for adults and adolescents ages 14–18. Referrals are accepted both from within Ireland and internationally.

St John of God University Hospital, Stillorgan provides clinical treatment for patients and their families, develops treatment programs for people with mental health diagnoses, conducts clinical research, and trains healthcare professionals psychiatric medicine. The hospital has affiliations with University College Dublin, University of Limerick, Trinity College Dublin, and Dublin City University for undergraduate and postgraduate education. The Royal College of Psychiatrists and Irish College of Psychiatrists also have affiliations with the hospital for postgraduate psychiatry training. The Royal College of Surgeons in Ireland also has a partnership with St John of God University Hospital, Stillorgan which allows pharmacy students to do clinical work placements at the hospital.
