= Gaelic Players Association =

Irish sports association

Gaelic Players Association logo

The Gaelic Players Association (Irish: Cumann na n-Imreoirí Gaelacha), or GPA, is the officially recognised player representative body for inter county Gaelic footballers and hurlers in Ireland. The GPA's aim is to promote and protect all aspects of player welfare and to provide an independent voice for players.

The GPA was formed in 1999 when former IMG employee Donal O'Neill and a number of high-profile inter-county players, including Tyrone's Fergal Logan and Peter Canavan, Derry's Fergal McCusker and Dublin's Dessie Farrell were instrumental in the birth of the organisation. The association was launched in Belfast. Farrell became the first chairman in 2000 and was subsequently appointed as full-time chief executive of the GPA in 2003.

Farrell and O'Neill helped secure a sponsorship deal with drinks manufacturer C&C (now Britvic) in 2003, which underpinned the growth and development of the GPA as a self-funded, not-for-profit organisation. Membership grew rapidly as the GPA lobbied vigorously for improvements in player welfare entitlements, making a significant breakthrough in 2007 when it successfully introduced Government Funding for inter-county players.

Following a lengthy campaign for formal recognition led by CEO Dessie Farrell and chairman, Cork hurling goalkeeper Dónal Óg Cusack, the GPA was formally recognised as the players' representative body by the GAA at its annual Congress in 2010. An interim agreement was also reached to provide support for the GPA's player welfare initiatives. In 2010 the GAA's amateur ethos was enshrined in the GPA's constitution.

== Activities ==
Since reaching an interim agreement with the GAA in 2009, the GAA has supported the GPA's Player Development Programme which provides off-field support services for inter-county players in the areas of education, career development, health and wellbeing and general such as a benevolent fund. With the Programme running since March 2010, inter-county players can now avail of scholarships, educational advice, an enhanced injury scheme, job searching advice, benevolent fund assistance for players in difficulty and a nationwide counselling service, gum shields, financial and budgeting advice, business start-up support and media training.

== Structures ==
The GPA is governed by three elected officers, a national executive committee and three sub-committees – management, finance and remuneration. Two Development Officers liaise with county squads on an ongoing basis. Each county panel has two GPA reps.

== Government funding ==
Following a lengthy campaign including the threat of strike action, the GPA secured Government Funding for all inter-county players in November 2007, and although there was protest among grass roots GAA members, the agreement was passed by GAA Congress in April 2008 when it was 'stressed that the scheme in no way impinged on the GAA's amateur status' and that the GAA would not be liable should the government withdraw its funding.

== 2007 strike vote ==
On Friday 11 November 2007, members of the GPA voted to strike. The results were 95.3% in favour. The GAA met this statement of a potential strike with regret and negotiations began to come up with a settlement. It was argued that the cancellation of the O'Byrne Cup could have the opposite effect for the welfare of Gaelic players as the cup was used as a tournament to raise money for the players' welfare funds. This allegation was met with assurance that the GPA would compensate in the event of a strike. Eventually the grants of 3.5 million euro went ahead and the pending strike was subsequently cancelled. This agreement was eventually officially recognised by both the GAA and the GPA and it was agreed that the GAA's amateur status would stay intact.

== Awards ==
The association launched an award in 2006 entitled the GPA Gaelic Team of the Year, sponsored by Opel cars, to recognise the achievements of Gaelic football and hurling players in parallel to the long-established GAA All Stars Awards. An annual award was also given to the Footballer of the Year and the Hurler of the Year. In 2011 it was announced that the GAA All Stars Awards and the GPA Awards would merge under the sponsorship of Opel. The move announced by Christy Cooney in September 2011 saw the achievements of players recognised jointly by the two organisations for the very first time.

== Partnerships ==
The GPA's extensive Player Development Programme is supported by the GAA. However, two commercial partnerships remain in place – Opel Ireland who sponsor the GPA's annual awards and Club Energise (now owned by Britvic Ireland). In May 2008, the GPA announced a strategic partnership with the Communications Clinic, providing career development and communications training for GPA members. The GPA also has arrangements with the Sports Surgery Clinic, Dublin and online sports university Setanta College.

== Representatives ==
Officers

- President: Brian Whelahan
- Chairman: Donal Óg Cusack
- Secretary: Ronan Sweeney
- Chief executive: Paul Flynn
