= University Hospital Limerick =

Hospital in Limerick city, Ireland

Coordinates: 52.6352°N 8.6561°W

- Health Service Executive
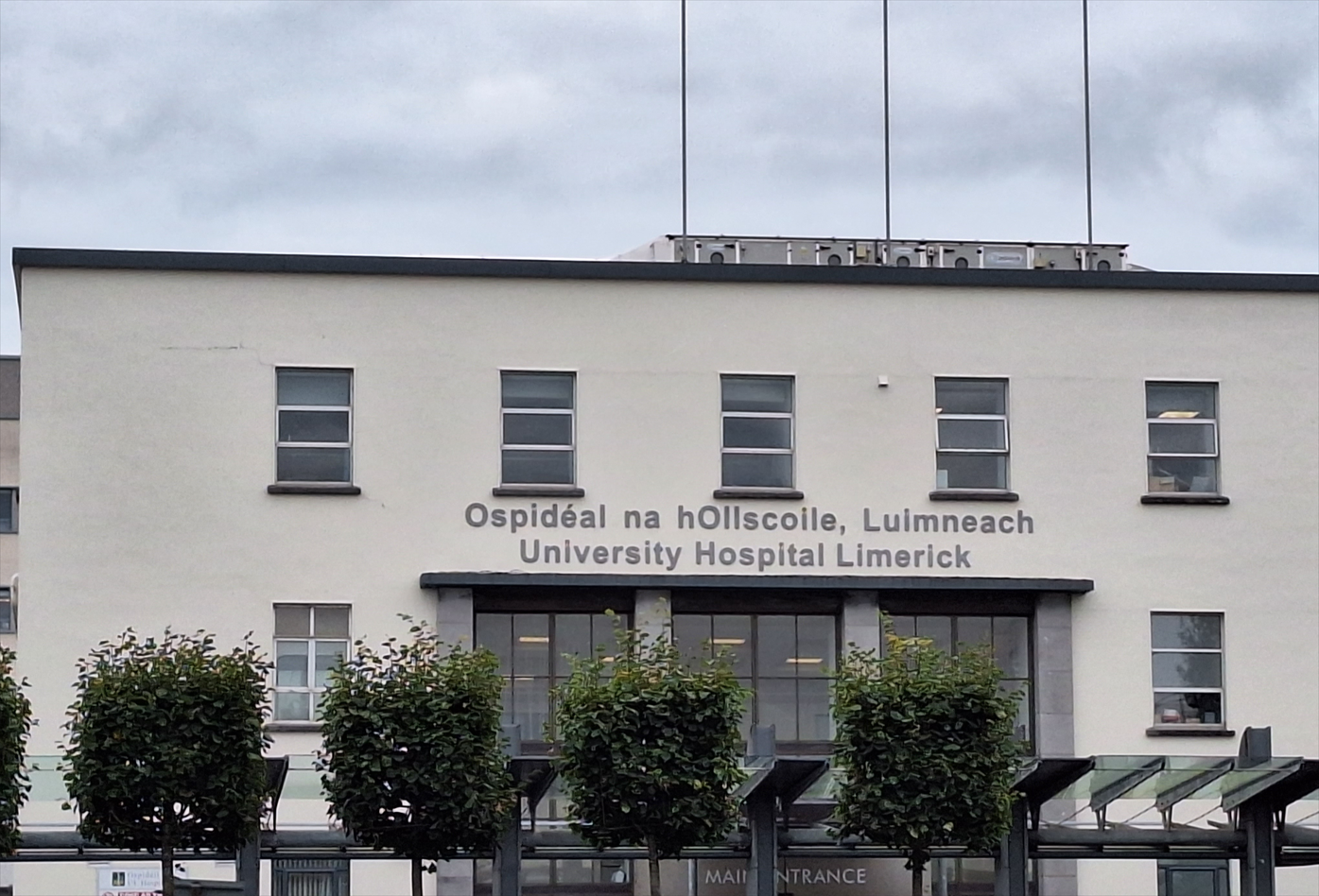

- Shown in Ireland

Geography
- Location: Dooradoyle, Limerick, Ireland

Organisation
- Care system: HSE
- Type: General
- Affiliated university: University of Limerick

Services
- Emergency department: Yes, 24 hours
- Beds: 522

History
- Founded: 1955

Links
- Website: www.hse.ie/eng/services/list/3/acutehospitals/hospitals/ulh/hospitals/uhl/
- Lists: Hospitals in the Republic of Ireland

University Hospital Limerick (Irish: Ospidéal na hOllscoile, Luimneach) is a Level 4 hospital located in Dooradoyle, Limerick, Ireland. It is 4 km south-west of the city centre, on the R526 road. The hospital is managed by UL Hospitals Group.

== History ==
The hospital, which was designed by Patrick Sheahan, was officially opened as the Limerick Regional Hospital on 16 May 1955. It became the Mid-Western Regional Hospital, Limerick in 2006. A new critical care unit opened in January 2013.

Following the establishment of the Graduate Medical School at the University of Limerick, it became the University Hospital Limerick in 2013 when the hospitals in the greater Mid-West Region became part of a single operating and governance structure known as the UL Hospitals Group.

In June 2017, a new Accident & Emergency Department opened in the hospital, replacing the former A&E facing the Main Entrance.

A new 60-bed medical block on four storeys, with three inpatient wards of 20 en-suite rooms, built by Western Building Systems, was opened in November 2020.

In 2021, a second 60-bed modular bed block and oncology ward was opened by the Minister for Health Stephen Donnelly. Further developments in the hospital include two additional 96-bed blocks to help alleviate chronic overcrowding on wards.

== Services ==
The hospital provides 522 beds, of which 375 are in-patient acute beds, while 97 are reserved for acute day cases. A further 50 beds are for psychiatric services. The hospital provides acute-care hospital services, including a 24-hour emergency department and is the location of the Mid-Western Cancer Centre.

The 24-hour Accident & Emergency department in UHL is the only one in the midwest region, with a catchment area of over 400,000 people.

== Criticism ==
Overcrowding is a significant problem in the Irish health system, however University Hospital Limerick continues to be the most overcrowded hospital in the country, with a new record of 150 people on trolleys marked in February 2024. The INMO regarded UHL as the 'worst hospital for overcrowding since records began'.

There is also criticism towards the Government's policies not to reopen the former A&E departments in Nenagh, Ennis and St. John's Hospital in the city.

Many protests by activist groups such as the Mid-West Hospital Campaign Group and individuals, as well as social, local and national media have highlighted the issues plaguing the hospital. Protests have often occurred outside the hospital grounds and outside Dáil Éireann in Dublin. In January 2023, a march involving almost 11,000 people took place through Limerick City Centre to Arthur's Quay Park in the city to highlight the overcrowding situation in UHL and the midwest. According to the Mid-West Hospital Campaign Group, the protest was made up of families of loved ones who received inadequate healthcare in UHL, as well as individuals who experienced the same.

In April 2024, the hospital was the most overcrowded hospital in the country, followed by University Hospital Galway and Cork University Hospital.

Following an investigation into the 2022 death of Aoife Johnston in UHL, former Chief Justice of Ireland Frank Clarke determined that her death was almost certainly avoidable. 16-year-old Johnston had been referred to the emergency department by an outside GP service for suspected sepsis, but poor communication and overcrowding meant that processes were not followed and the necessary antibiotics were not administered until too late.

== See also ==
- Ennis Hospital
- Nenagh Hospital
- St John's Hospital, Limerick city
- Croom Orthopaedic Hospital
- University Maternity Hospital Limerick
- UL Hospitals Group
