= St Fintan's Hospital GAA =

Former GAA club in Portlaoise, County Laois, Ireland

St Fintan's Hospital
- Oispidéal Naomh Fiontáin
- Founded: 1940s
- County: Laois

St Fintan's Hospital GAA was a Gaelic football club in County Laois, Ireland.

The Gaelic Athletic Association club was founded in the late 1940s by staff members at St. Fintan's Hospital in Portlaoise.

The club won the Laois Intermediate Football Championship on three occasions (1951, 1960 and 1970) and the Laois Junior Football Championship also on three occasions (1950, 1959 and 1964).

The club faded out of existence in the late 1970s after winning the Laois Junior B Football Championship in 1975.
