= University Maternity Hospital, Limerick =

University Maternity Hospital
- Health Service Executive
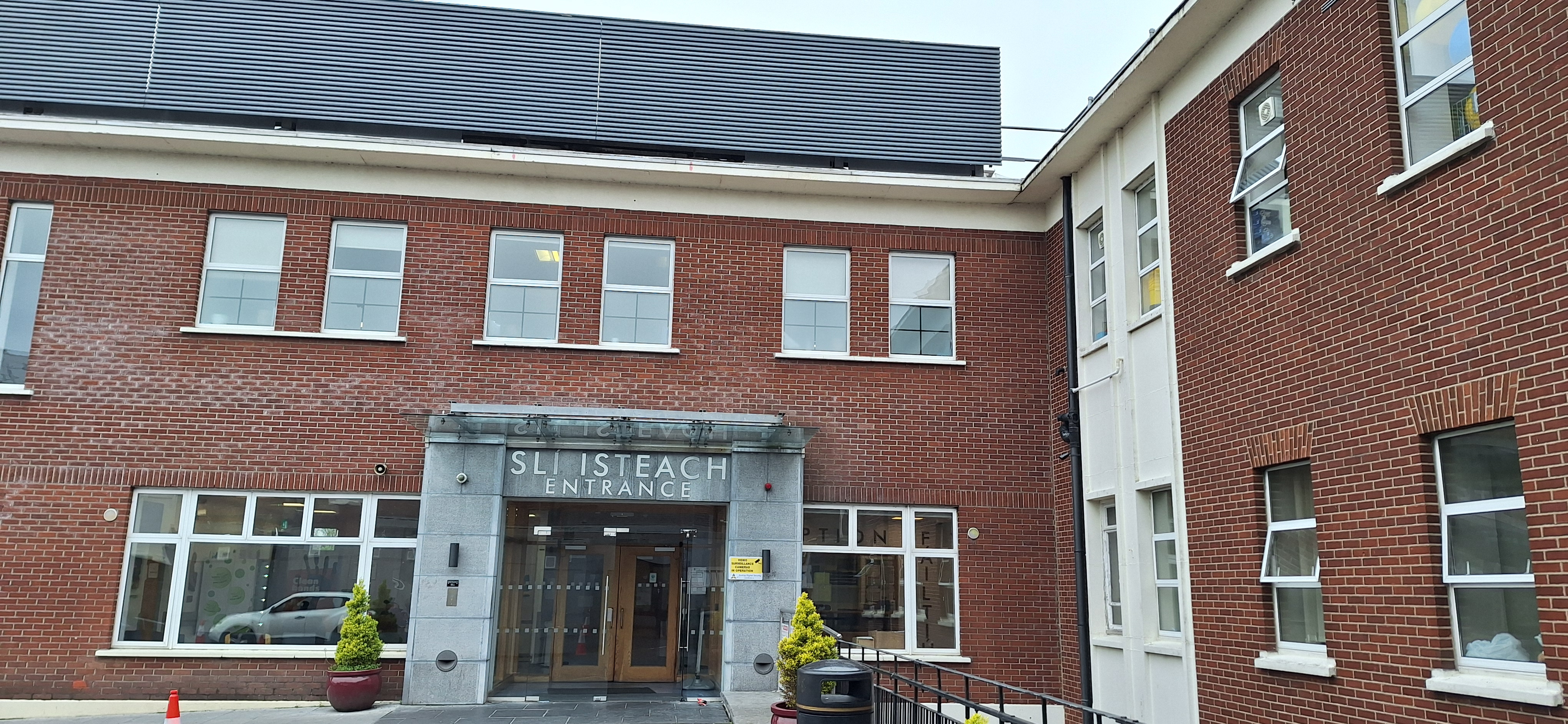

- Shown in Ireland

Geography
- Location: Limerick, County Limerick, Ireland
- Coordinates: 52.6676°N 8.6356°W

Organisation
- Care system: HSE
- Type: Specialist

Services
- Emergency department: Yes Accident & Emergency
- Speciality: Maternity

History
- Founded: 1960; 66 years ago

Links
- Website: www2.hse.ie/services/hospitals/university-maternity-hospital-limerick/
- Lists: Hospitals in the Republic of Ireland

The University Maternity Hospital, Limerick (Irish: Ospidéal Máithreachais na hOllscoile, Luimneach) is a hospital in County Limerick, Ireland. It is managed by UL Hospitals Group.

== History ==
The hospital on Ennis Road, which was designed by Patrick Sheahan, was opened by the Minister of Health, Seán MacEntee, as St Munchin's Regional Maternity Hospital in October 1960. It became the Mid-Western Regional Maternity Hospital in 2006.

Following the establishment of the Graduate Medical School at the University of Limerick, it became the University Maternity Hospital Limerick in 2013 when the hospitals in the greater Mid-West Region became part of a single operating and governance structure known as the UL Hospitals Group.

In 2013 it was listed in the Protection of Life During Pregnancy Bill 2013, subsequently enacted as the Protection of Life During Pregnancy Act 2013, as one of the institutions where abortions are authorised to be carried out under the Act.

In 2018 it was announced that the hospital would move to Dooradoyle to be co-located with the University Hospital Limerick.
