= St. Joseph's Hospital, Dublin =

St. Joseph's Hospital
- Health Service Executive
- Shown in Dublin

Geography
- Location: Raheny, County Dublin, Ireland
- Coordinates: 53.382663°N 6.182288°W

Organisation
- Care system: HSE
- Type: Specialist

Services
- Emergency department: Yes Accident & Emergency
- Speciality: Rehabilitation hospital

History
- Founded: 1958

Links
- Website: www.beaumont.ie
- Lists: Hospitals in the Republic of Ireland

St. Joseph's Hospital (Irish: Ospidéal Naomh Seosamh) is a hospital in Raheny, on the Northside of Dublin in Ireland. It is used as a rehabilitation hospital for patients of the Beaumont Hospital in Dublin.

== History ==
The hospital was founded in Edenmore House in Raheny (Note: Edenmore House was built in the early 18th century and was acquired by Samuel Dick, a Dublin merchant, in 1787, by John Maconchy, a businessman, in 1825, and by the Dublin to Drogheda Railway in 1842.) by the Sisters of St. Joseph of Chambéry as St. Joseph's Nursing Home in 1958. It operated as a private hospital until 2001 when it was acquired by the Health Service Executive. It was then transferred to the management of the Beaumont Hospital in 2004. The Beaumont Hospital established a new 14-bed rehabilitation centre at St. Joseph's Hospital in March 2005 a community nursing unit was completed there in 2010 and a care for the elderly unit was officially opened there by the Taoiseach, Enda Kenny, in July 2014.
