= Mater Private Hospital, Cork =

Hospital in Cork, Ireland

Mater Private Hospital
- Shown in Ireland

Geography
- Location: Mahon, County Cork, Ireland
- Coordinates: 51°53′11″N 8°24′22″W

Organisation
- Type: Private hospital

History
- Founded: 2010

Links
- Lists: Hospitals in the Republic of Ireland

The Mater Private Hospital (Irish: Ospidéal Príobháideach an Mater) is a private hospital in Cork, Ireland. It is associated with the Mater Private Hospital in Dublin.

== History ==
The hospital was founded by surgeons Joseph Sheehan and Jimmy Sheehan, who had established the Blackrock Clinic in Dublin It was built at a cost of €90m and opened by the Minister for Foreign Affairs, Micheál Martin, TD on 15 October 2010. After the hospital failed to reach agreement with the insurer, VHI, to provide cover, it was closed on 9 March 2011. KPMG was appointed as liquidator in May 2011. The hospital was subsequently acquired by Mater Private and re-opened in 2012.

== Services ==
The hospital has 102 in-patient beds and 6 operating theatres.
