= Sports Surgery Clinic, Dublin =

Sports Surgery Clinic

Geography
- Location: Santry, Dublin, Ireland
- Coordinates: 53.404199°N 6.254017°W

Organisation
- Type: Specialist

Services
- Beds: 63
- Speciality: Orthopaedic surgery

History
- Opened: 2007

Links
- Website: sportssurgeryclinic.com
- Lists: Hospitals in the Republic of Ireland

The Sports Surgery Clinic (SSC), located in Santry, Dublin, Ireland, is a private hospital focused on orthopaedic surgery, and orthopaedic, spinal, sports, and exercise-related injuries. Numerous patients have been famous athletes and rock stars.

On March 13, 2023, the Irish clinic was acquired by US healthcare group UPMC and became known as UPMC Sports Surgery Clinic.

== History ==
The clinic was opened in 2007, was founded by Ray Moran who currently owns a 30.8 percent stake and is the Medical Director. It is also partly owned by Ray Moran's brother, Kevin Moran a former Manchester United and Republic of Ireland footballer. In 2019, the Carlyle Cardinal Ireland fund took a 38 percent ownership with plans to expand the clinic facilities to include two new surgery theatres, four intensive care units, seven new ensuite rooms, and anaesthetic and preparation rooms. The clinic was valued at €60,000,000 in 2019.

Ray Moran is a knee specialist known as "Dr Cruciate" and as a "'surgeon to the stars'", with clients including rock star Jon Bon Jovi and numerous athletes (such as Bernard Brogan, Colm Cooper, Brendan Maher, Alan Quinlan and Josh van der Flier). Kevin Moran sits on the board of his brother's Sports Surgery Clinic.

== Facilities ==
The facilities of the clinic include:

- Seven ultra clean ventilation operating theatres
- Physiotherapy and rehabilitation services
- Diagnostic imaging services (including CT and MRI)

The hospital employs over 500 healthcare workers and staff, and has 63 in-patient beds, 26 day-care beds and 21 consultancy suites.
