= GPA Footballer of the Year =

The GPA Footballer of the Year was awarded annually by the Gaelic Players Association, as part of the Opel Gaelic Players awards scheme, established in 2006.

== History ==
The title was first awarded in 2001, at the foundation of the association, and was first sponsored in 2005, also by Opel. The award honoured the achievements of a Gaelic footballer of outstanding excellence for each season. At the end of the Football Championship the association members voted on for the award recipient. As the award was voted on by the players it was often viewed as one of the greatest individual honours. Unlike other GAA awards the GPA Footballer of the Year was presented with a prize which has the monetary value of a new car.

The GPA Footballer of the Year award has since been merged with the All Stars Footballer of the Year.

== Winners ==
| 2011 | Alan Brogan | Dublin |
| 2010 | Bernard Brogan | Dublin |
| 2009 | Paul Galvin | Kerry |
| 2008 | Sean Cavanagh | Tyrone |
| 2007 | Marc Ó Sé | Kerry |
| 2006 | Kieran Donaghy | Kerry |
| 2005 | Stephen O'Neill | Tyrone |
| 2004 | Mattie Forde | Wexford |
| 2003 | Steven McDonnell | Armagh |
| 2002 | Kieran McGeeney | Armagh |
| 2001 | Pádraic Joyce | Galway |
