= UL Hospitals Group =

Hospital group in Ireland

The UL Hospitals Group (Irish: Grúpa Ospidéal Ollscoil Luimnigh) is one of the hospital groups established by the Health Service Executive in Ireland.

== History ==
The grouping of hospitals was announced by the Irish Minister for Health, Dr. James Reilly TD in May 2013, as part of a restructure of Irish public hospitals and a goal of delivering better patient care. The Group was given responsibility for the following hospitals:

- University Hospital Limerick
- Ennis Hospital
- Nenagh Hospital
- St. John's Hospital, Limerick
- University Maternity Hospital, Limerick
- Croom Hospital

In April 2019, UL Hospitals Group announced a significant increase in violent incidents across its hospitals.

== Services ==
The Group is headed by a Chief Executive, who is accountable to the National Director for Acute Services in the Health Service Executive, and is responsibility for delivering inpatient care, emergency care, maternity services, outpatient care and diagnostic services at its designated hospitals. The Group's designated cancer centre is University Hospital Limerick. The Group's academic partner is University of Limerick.
