= Enda McGowan =

Cavan Gaelic footballer (1946–2022)

Personal information
- Native name: Éanna Mac Gabhann (Irish)
- Born: 1946 Manorhamilton, County Leitrim, Ireland
- Died: 15 June 2022 (aged 75) Cavan, Ireland
- Occupation: Civil servant

Sport
- Sport: Gaelic football
- Position: Right wing-back
Club
- Years: Club
- Ballyhaise
Club titles
- Cavan titles: 0
Inter-county
- Years: County
- 1967–1979: Cavan
Inter-county titles
- Ulster titles: 2
- All-Irelands: 0
- NFL: 0
- All Stars: 0

Kieran Enda McGowan (1946 – 15 June 2022) was an Irish Gaelic footballer who played at club level with Ballyhaise and at senior inter-county level with the Cavan county team. He usually lined out as a wing-back.

== Career ==
McGowan began his inter-county career at minor level with Leitrim, before having a lengthy career as a member of the Cavan senior team. He won Ulster SFC titles in 1967 and 1969. McGowan also played in the Ulster finals of 1968, 1976, and 1978, the latter as team captain. His achievements with Cavan were acknowledged with his being named as a replacement All-Star, while he also won Railway Cup medals with Ulster in 1970 and 1971. With his club Ballyhaise, McGowan won a Junior League medal, a Cavan IFC medal and played in the Cavan SFC final in 1978. After his playing days concluded, he was a selector for the Cavan senior team which reached the 1983 Ulster final, but lost out against Donegal.

== Death ==
McGowan died on 15 June 2022, aged 75.

== Honours ==
Ballyhaise

- Cavan Intermediate Football Championship: 1968

Cavan

- Ulster Senior Football Championship: 1967, 1969
- Dr McKenna Cup: 1968

Ulster

- Railway Cup: 1970, 1971

Sporting positions
Preceded by	Cavan senior football team captain 1978	Succeeded by
