= Beaumont Hospital, Dublin =

Beaumont Hospital
- Health Service Executive
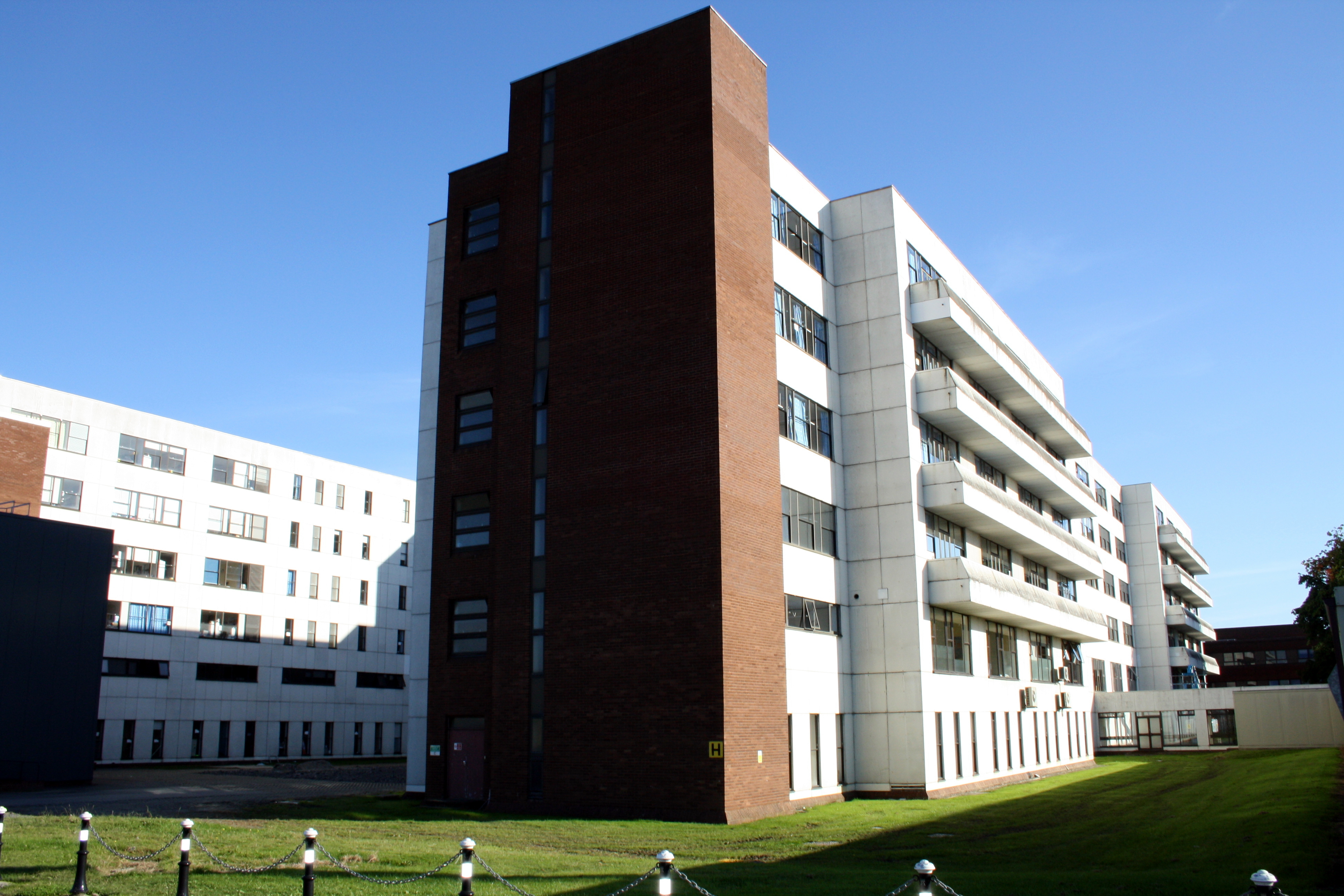

- Shown in Dublin

Geography
- Location: Beaumont, County Dublin, Ireland
- Coordinates: 53.391142°N 6.222154°W

Organisation
- Care system: HSE
- Type: General
- Affiliated university: Royal College of Surgeons in Ireland; Dublin City University

Services
- Emergency department: Yes
- Beds: 820

History
- Founded: 29 November 1987; 38 years ago

Links
- Website: www.beaumont.ie

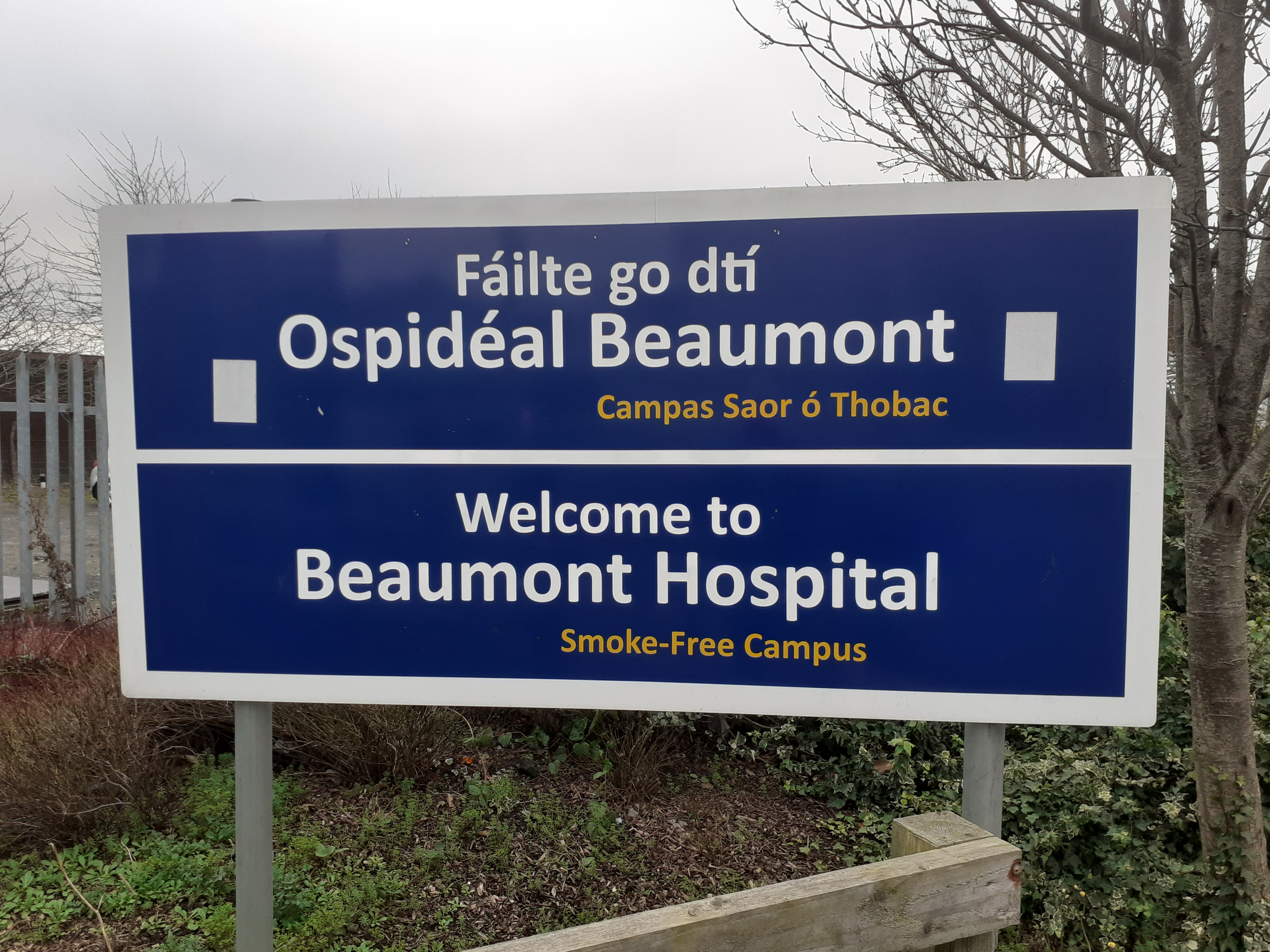
Welcome to Beaumont Hospital bilingual sign

Beaumont Hospital (Irish: Ospidéal Beaumont) is a large teaching hospital located in Beaumont, Dublin, Ireland. It is managed by RCSI Hospitals - one of the hospital groups established by the Health Service Executive. Its academic partner is the Royal College of Surgeons in Ireland.

St. Joseph's Hospital (Raheny) is also under the management of the Beaumont Hospital Board.

== History ==
The planning for the hospital, which was commissioned to replace the Richmond Surgical Hospital and the Jervis Street Hospital began in 1977. The design was based on the scheme for the Cork University Hospital. It was built at a cost of €52.7 million and was officially opened on 29 November 1987. Beaumont Hospital took over management of St. Joseph's Hospital in Raheny in August 2004.

The Dublin Brain Bank, a research facility for post-mortem storage and examination of brain tissue, opened at Beaumont Hospital in October 2008. A new cystic fibrosis unit opened at the hospital in December 2010 and a new radiation therapy unit for cancer treatment was established at the hospital in 2012.

The Ashlin Centre, a new adult psychiatric facility, was built and opened to patients in 2014.

The new RCSI Smurfit Building was opened on the Beaumont Hospital campus in 2018, built at a cost of €9.5 million.

== Services ==
Beaumont Hospital employs approximately 3,000 staff. It provides 820 beds, of which 631 are in-patient acute beds, while 110 are reserved for acute day cases. A further 10 beds are designated for in-patient psychiatric care.

The hospital provides regional cancer services to the North East Region of the Republic of Ireland and was designated as one of Ireland's eight Cancer Centres of Excellence in 2007. The Smurfit Education & Research Centre, established in 2000, is the principal clinical research centre on the site of Beaumont Hospital.

Beaumont is the principal undergraduate and postgraduate medical training and research centre associated with the Royal College of Surgeons in Ireland with whom it shares its campus. It also provides clinical training for undergraduate nursing students from Dublin City University.

It is the Designated Cancer Centre and the Regional Treatment Centre for Ear, Nose and Throat, and Gastroenterology. It is also the National Referral Centre for Neurosurgery and Neurology, Renal Transplantation, and Cochlear Implantation.

== Recent developments ==
In 2022, the Beaumont RCSI Cancer Centre — a collaboration between Beaumont Hospital, RCSI University of Medicine and Health Sciences, and St Luke's Radiation Oncology Network — received accreditation from the Organisation of European Cancer Institutes (OECI), becoming only the second cancer centre in Ireland to achieve this designation.

In January 2025, Beaumont Hospital launched a five-year strategic plan, Building Excellence in Care, Together (2025–2030), prioritising infrastructure renewal, digital transformation, and the pursuit of Joint Commission International (JCI) accreditation. Planning permission for a substantially expanded emergency department was submitted in October 2024.
