= Noel Reynolds (priest) =

Noel Reynolds was a priest of the Archdiocese of Dublin who died in 2002. He served as curate in eight parishes including Rathcoole, parish priest of Glendalough, County Wicklow and then chaplain at the National Rehabilitation Hospital, Dún Laoghaire, County Dublin.

A colleague of Reynolds, Fr Arthur O’Neill revealed he had reported concerns about Reynolds when he was parish priest of Rathnew, County Wicklow, and Reynolds was parish priest in neighbouring Glendalough, but Reynolds was allowed to continue his duties. Reynolds later admitted that he abused more than 100 children in eight parishes. Reynolds resigned from his role as parish priest on health grounds but Connell neglected to inform National Rehabilitation Hospital authorities where Reynolds was to become chaplain in 1997 that Reynolds was a paedophile.

== See also ==
- Roman Catholic Church sex abuse scandal
- Roman Catholic priests accused of sex offenses
- Ferns Report, on sexual abuse in the Roman Catholic Diocese of Ferns, Ireland
- Crimen sollicitationis
- Pontifical Secret
