= St. Senan's Hospital =

- Health Service Executive
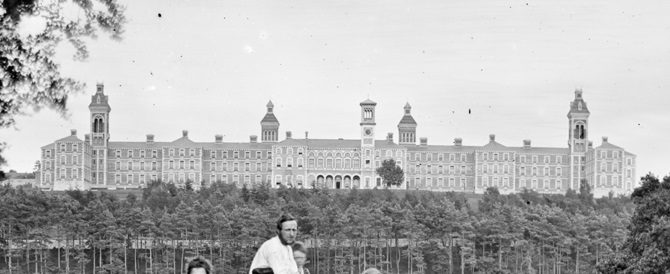
- St. Senan's Hospital

- Shown in Ireland

Geography
- Location: Enniscorthy, County Wexford, Ireland
- Coordinates: 52.48857°N 6.56410°W

Organisation
- Care system: HSE
- Type: Specialist

Services
- Speciality: Psychiatric hospital

History
- Founded: 1868
- Closed: 2015

St. Senan's Hospital (Irish: Ospidéal Naomh Senan) was a psychiatric hospital in Enniscorthy, County Wexford, Ireland.

== History ==
The hospital, which was designed by James Bell and James Barry Farrell in the Italianate style, opened as the Enniscorthy Asylum in 1868. It became Enniscorthy Mental Hospital in the 1920s and went on to become St. Senan's Hospital in the 1950s. After the introduction of deinstitutionalisation in the late 1980s the hospital went into a period of decline and closed completely in 2015.

Planning permission for the development of private housing was granted in March 2022.
