= St. Canice's Hospital =

Former psychiatric hospital in Kilkenny city, Ireland

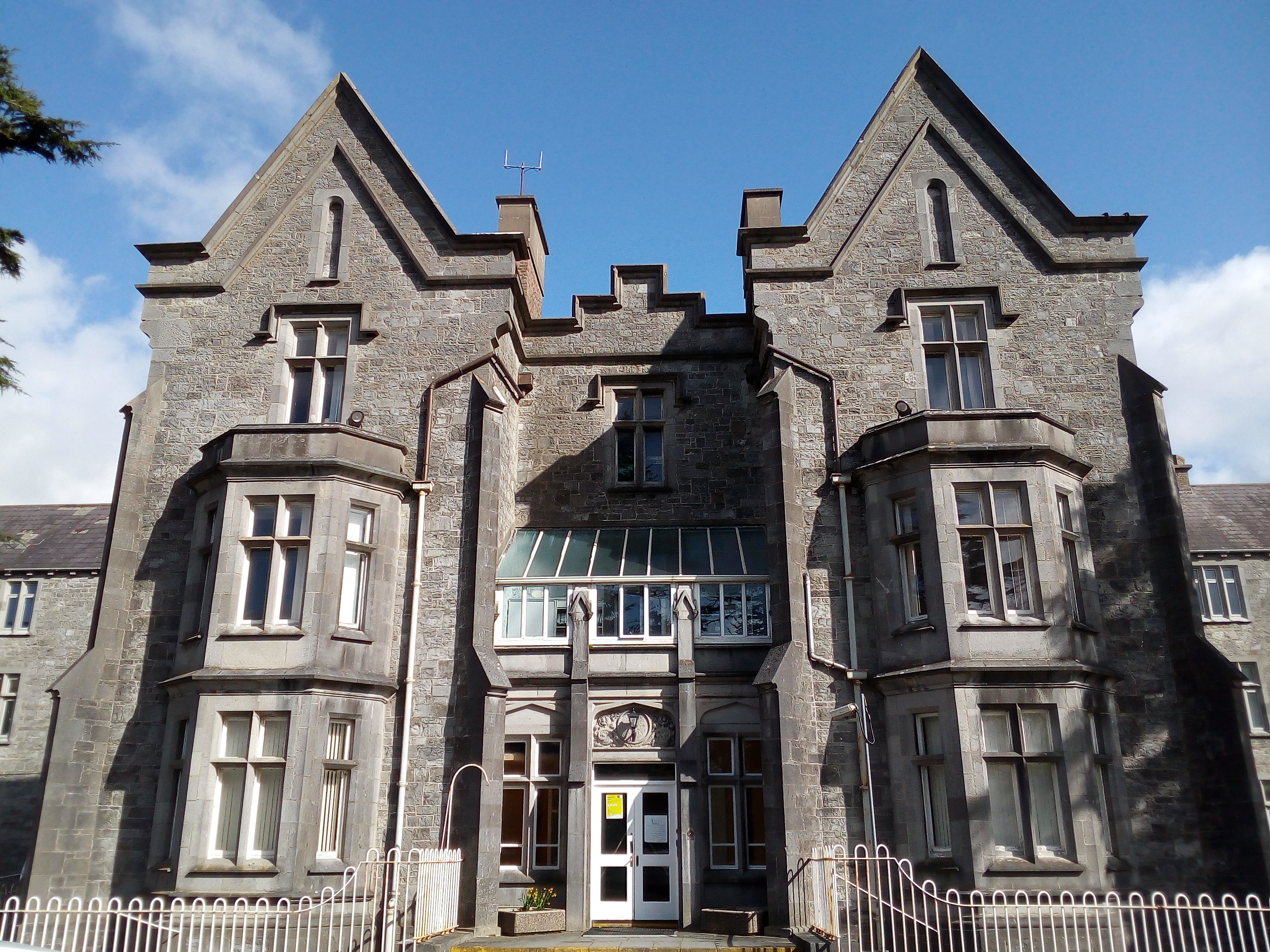
- St. Canice's Hospital

- Shown in Ireland

Geography
- Location: Kilkenny, County Kilkenny, Ireland
- Coordinates: 52.64870°N 7.23213°W

Organisation
- Type: Specialist

Services
- Speciality: Psychiatric hospital

History
- Founded: 1852
- Closed: 2006

Links
- Lists: Hospitals in the Republic of Ireland

St. Canice's Hospital (Irish: Ospidéal Naomh Cainneach) was a psychiatric hospital in Kilkenny, County Kilkenny, Ireland.

== History ==
The hospital, which was designed by George Papworth in the Elizabethan style, opened as the Kilkenny Asylum in 1852. It became Kilkenny Mental Hospital in the 1920s and went on to become St. Canice's Hospital in the 1950s. After the introduction of deinstitutionalisation in the late 1980s the hospital went into a period of decline and closed in July 2006. A modern facility, St Gabriel's Ward, has been created in the grounds of the old hospital.
