= Erinville Hospital =

- Health Service Executive

Geography
- Location: Cork city, County Cork, Ireland
- Coordinates: 51.89624°N 8.48781°W

Organisation
- Care system: HSE
- Type: Specialist

Services
- Speciality: Maternity

History
- Opened: 1861
- Closed: 31 March 2007

The Erinville Hospital (Irish: Ospidéal Erinville) was one of the three maternity hospitals in Cork, Ireland. It was located on the Western Road in the city.

== History ==
The hospital was initially established at Hanover Street on 10 March 1799. It moved to Dyke Parade in the mid-1820s. Its final location was a property which had been built for the Perrot Family in Western Road in 1861; the hospital acquired the property and moved there in 1898. After services transferred to the Cork University Maternity Hospital, Erinville Hospital, along with the St. Finbarr's Maternity Hospital and the Bon Secours Maternity Hospital, closed on 31 March 2007.

In 2008 some buildings on the site of the hospital were demolished.

The building has been converted to office accommodation. As of 2023 the former hospital is in use as offices for the South/South West Hospital Group.
