= Mater Private Hospital =

Hospital in Dublin, Ireland

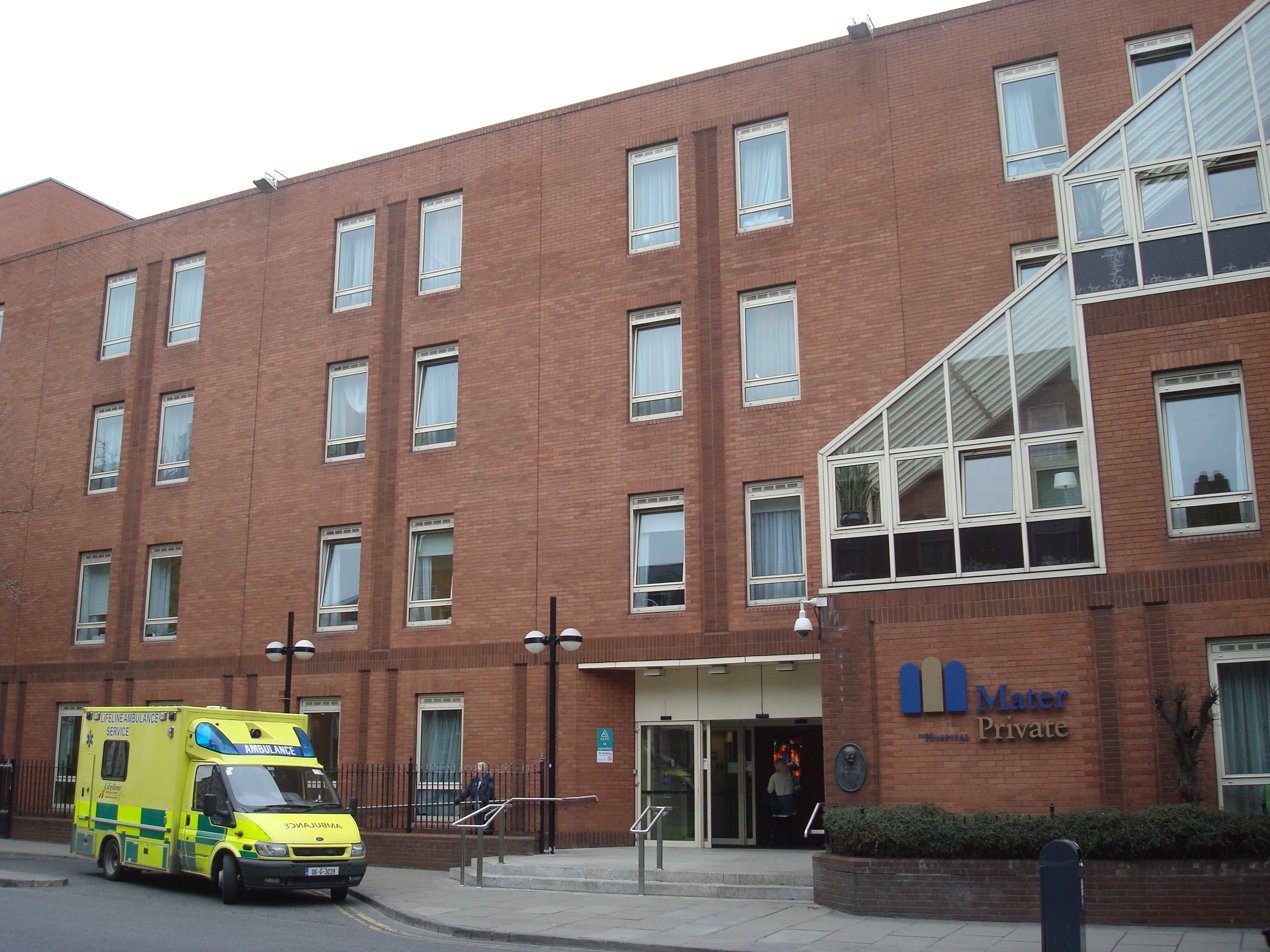
- Mater Private Hospital in Dublin

- Shown in Dublin

Geography
- Location: Dublin, Ireland
- Coordinates: 53.357856°N 6.264391°W

Organisation
- Type: District General
- Religious affiliation: Roman Catholic

History
- Founded: 1986

Links
- Website: www.materprivate.ie

The Mater Private Hospital (Irish: Ospidéal Príobháideach an Mater), also known as Mater Private Network, is a private hospital business. Its main hospital is located just to the east of the Mater Misericordiae University Hospital in Dublin, Ireland. In addition to the main hospital in Dublin, the business has a hospital in Cork, cancer treatment centres in Limerick and Liverpool and various out-patient clinics.

== History ==
The Mater Private Hospital in Dublin was built on the site of No 7 Eccles Street, the home of the main character (Leopold Bloom) in James Joyce's Ulysses. In Joyce's youth, No 7 Eccles Street was the actual home of his contemporary, JF Byrne. Its founders included Sister Gemma Byrne who became the first chief executive after the Dublin hospital's opening in May 1986. The Mater Private Group was sold to Infravia Capital Partners for about €500 million in 2018.

== Development ==
In 2022 it signed a deal with Meditech to implement its electronic health record. This will include a specialty specific solution for oncologists.

In 2024, the hospital expanded its Emergency Department by doubling its treatment capacity with new bays and specialist staff, and introduced Ireland's first fully automated medication dispensing cabinets (ADCs) across wards in the Dublin hospital.

== Research ==
In 2019, Mater Private Network partnered with the Royal College of Surgeons in Ireland (RCSI) to establish the Cardiovascular Research Institute Dublin (CVRI Dublin) at the Eccles Street hospital. The institute is led by Robert Byrne, Director of Cardiology at Mater Private Network and Professor of Cardiovascular Research at RCSI, and is structured around four domains: outcomes research, clinical trials, core laboratory services, and systematic reviews.

In October 2024, a new cardiac catheterisation laboratory suite opened at the Dublin hospital, representing an investment of €8 million. With the addition, Mater Private Network operates six catheterisation laboratories across its Dublin and Cork facilities. Among the CVRI Dublin's active studies is the CYCLOPES trial, an international investigator-initiated multicentre study enrolling 500 patients across 25 European sites, funded by Boston Scientific, examining a novel technique for treating blocked coronary arteries using intravascular ultrasound-guided plaque modification.

The Mater Private network serves approximately 300,000 patients annually across two acute hospitals, a radiation oncology centre, two day-hospitals, and three outpatient clinics.

== Funding ==
Patients may be self-paying, covered by private health insurance, or funded under the state's National Treatment Purchase Fund (NTPF). In 2010, the hospital received €23 million in NTPF funds, the largest payment to any single institution. In 2011 it was announced that the NTPF programme would be wound down.

== Accreditation ==
In 2002, the Dublin hospital received Joint Commission accreditation.
