= Mallow General Hospital =

- Health Service Executive
- Shown in Ireland

Geography
- Location: Mallow, County Cork, Ireland
- Coordinates: 52°09′05″N 8°39′57″W

Organisation
- Care system: HSE
- Type: Regional
- Affiliated university: University College Cork

Services
- Emergency department: No Accident & Emergency
- Beds: 81

History
- Founded: 1841

Links
- Lists: Hospitals in the Republic of Ireland

Mallow General Hospital (Irish: Ospidéal Ginearálta Mhala) is a public hospital located in Mallow, County Cork, Ireland.

== History ==
The hospital has its origins in the Mallow Union Workhouse and Infirmary which was designed by George Wilkinson and opened in 1841. Following the creation of the Irish Free State the infirmary became a district hospital which evolved to become Mallow General Hospital. The administration block was rebuilt in 1936.

== Services ==
The hospital provides 81 beds, of which 76 are in-patient acute beds, while 5 are reserved for acute day cases.

== See also ==
- Cork University Hospital
- St. Mary's Health Campus
