= College of Psychiatrists of Ireland =

Irish psychiatry professional body

The College of Psychiatrists of Ireland, also known as the College of Psychiatry of Ireland, is a professional body for psychiatrists in Ireland. The college has a president, elected for a three-year term. The College is associated with the Irish Journal of Psychological Medicine.

In 2018, John Hillery, the then-president of the College, quit working for the Health Service Executive, as he felt it did not provide enough support for patients and doctors, was overly-bureaucratic, which resulted in him feeling "ethically compromised". In 2022, the college again criticized the Irish government funding and called for a "radical overhaul" of the HSE's mental healthcare system.

== See also ==
- Health Service Executive (HSE)
- Medical Council
- Mental health in Ireland
- Cannabis and mental health
