= Bernard Brogan Jnr =

Dublin Gaelic footballer

Bernard Brogan
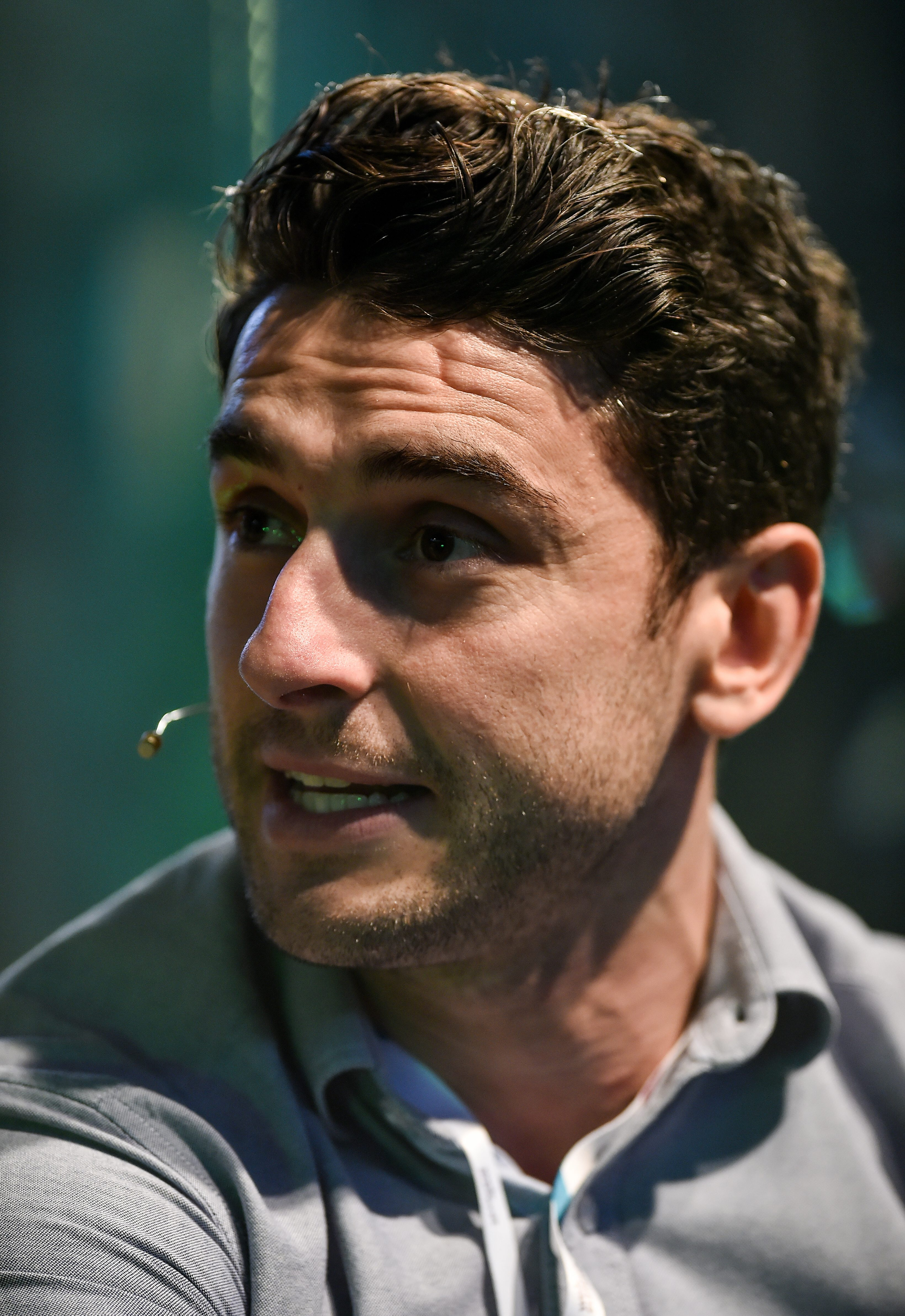
- Brogan in 2014

Personal information
- Native name: Bearnard Ó Brógáin (Irish)
- Born: 3 April 1984 (age 42) Castleknock, Dublin, Ireland
- Occupation: Businessman
- Height: 1.75 m (5 ft 9 in)

Sport
- Sport: Gaelic football
- Position: Left corner-forward
Club
- Years: Club
- 2003–: St Oliver Plunketts/Eoghan Ruadh
Club titles
- Dublin titles: 0
College
- Years: College
- Dublin City University
College titles
- Sigerson titles: 1
Inter-county*
Years	County	Apps (scores)
2006–2019	Dublin	58 (21–197)
Inter-county titles
- Leinster titles: 13
- All-Irelands: 7
- NFL: 5
- All Stars: 4
- *Inter County team apps and scores correct as of 17:38, 23 September 2017.

Bernard Brogan (born 3 April 1984) is a Gaelic footballer from the St Oliver Plunketts/Eoghan Ruadh club who previously played for the Dublin county team. He is originally from the Battery Heights. From a famous footballing family, he is the son of former All-Ireland winning and All Star player Bernard Brogan Snr and is the brother of former Dublin players Alan and Paul. His uncle Jim was also an inter-county footballer for Dublin. Alongside most of his family, Brogan has attended St Declan's College on Navan Road.

As of 2013, he was the Gaelic footballer with the second highest number of followers on Twitter, between Paul Galvin and Michael Murphy.

== Playing career ==
=== 2006–2008: Early years ===
Brogan won the 2006 Sigerson Cup with DCU. He scored one point in the game against QUB. He was on the 2006 Plunketts team that won the Dublin Division Two League title with a win over Garda. He was named on the 2006 Dublin Bus/Evening Herald Blue Star football XV at left corner forward.

Brogan scored his first point for Dublin against Fermanagh in the 2007 NFL. He made his Championship debut for Dublin as a late sub in Dublin's quarter-final win over Meath. He made his first start for Dublin in the semi-final against Offaly, but was substituted in the 45th minute. He regained his position for the final against Laois at Croke Park, scoring 1–01 in Dublin's 3–14 to 1-14 Leinster title winning game. Along with brother Alan, he was nominated for an All Star Award in 2007 as half forward.

In 2008, Brogan won the Dublin AFL Division 1 title with his club St Oliver Plunketts Eoghan Ruadh, scoring 1–05 in the final at Parnell Park. It was the first league title in the club's history. With Dublin he won the 2008 O'Byrne Cup by beating Longford in the final.

=== 2009–2011: Middle years ===
In 2009, Brogan won another Leinster title with Dublin, but his season ended with defeat to Kerry in the All-Ireland quarter-final.

After an exceptional season for Dublin on the full forward line in 2010, Brogan was awarded an All Star and was named as 2010 Vodafone Footballer of the Year.

In 2011, Brogan won an All-Ireland title with Dublin, the team's first All-Ireland since 1995. Brogan scored six points in the final against Kerry. He later revealed his celebrations were cut short as he had to do a drug test straight after the game. He passed with flying colours and resumed his celebrations.

=== 2012–2019: Later years ===
In 2012, Brogan won another Leinster title when Dublin beat Meath in the final. Then he missed an absolute sitter in the All-Ireland semi-final against Mayo. The miss haunted Brogan as Dublin lost the game by a narrow margin.

Brogan won the 2013 NFL with Dublin against Tyrone at Cork. He scored five frees in the game. He then won another Leinster title against Meath and was part of the Dublin team that won the 2013 All-Ireland Senior Football Championship Final, defeating Mayo by 2–12 to 1–14. Brogan scored 2–03 in the match, was All-Ireland final man of the match and The Sunday Game named him their man of the match and included him on their team of the year. Brogan was then awarded an All Star for his performances in 2013.

Brogan won the 2014 NFL with Dublin but his season came to an abrupt end when Donegal defeated Dublin in that year's All-Ireland semi-final, a momentous result that sent shockwaves through the sport.

Following a third All-Ireland Senior Football title in September 2015, Brogan was appointed captain of the Ireland international rules football team for the 2015 Series against Australia.

On 24 October 2019, Brogan announced his retirement from inter-county football.

In total Brogan played 116 games for Dublin, league and championship, scoring 36 goals and 344 points (452), making him Dublin's third top scorer of all time, behind Dean Rock (14-419; 461 in 89 games) and Jimmy Keaveney (30-402; 492 in 104 games).

== Honours ==
Team

- 13 Leinster Senior Football Championships (2006, 2007, 2008, 2009, 2011, 2012, 2013, 2014, 2015, 2016, 2017, 2018, 2019)
- 7 All-Ireland Senior Football Championship (2011, 2013, 2015, 2016, 2017, 2018, 2019)
- 5 National Football League (2013, 2014, 2015, 2016, 2018)
- 2 O'Byrne Cups (2007, 2008)
- 1 Sigerson Cup with DCU (2006)
- 1 All-Ireland U21 Football Championship (2003)
- 1 Leinster Under-21 Football Championship (2005)
- 1 Dublin AFL Division 1 (2007)
- 1 Dublin AFL Division 2 (2006)
- 1 Kildare U21 Championship (National University Maynooth) (2003)
- 1 U21 'B' Hurling Championship 3cups of tea (2004)
- 1 U21 'B' Football Championship (2004)
- 1 International Rules Series (2015)

Individual

- 4 All Stars Awards (2010, 2011, 2013, 2015)
- 1 Irish Player of the International Rules Series Award (2015)
- 1 All Stars Footballer of the Year (2010)
- 1 Texaco Footballer of the Year (2010)
- 1 GPA Footballer of the Year (2010)
- 1 Opel GPA Player of the Month for August (2010)
- 1 The Star Newspaper Footballer of the Year (2010)
- 1 All-Ireland Senior Football Championship Final Man of the Match: (2013)

== Career statistics ==
As of 22 July 2019.

Team	Season	National League			Leinster		All-Ireland		Total	
Team	Season	Division	Apps	Score	Apps	Score	Apps	Score	Apps	Score
Dublin	2006	Division 1A	2	0-00	0	0-00	0	0-00	2	0-00
Dublin	2007	Division 1A	7	0-02	3	1-01	2	0-04	12	1-07
Dublin	2008	Division 2	5	2-09	1	0-00	1	0-03	7	2-12
Dublin	2009	Division 1	5	1-21	3	2-17	1	0-03	9	3-41
Dublin	2010	Division 1	7	3-31	2	2-07	5	1-35	14	6-73
Dublin	2011	Division 1	7	2-26	3	0-14	3	0-15	13	2-55
Dublin	2012	Division 1	0	0-00	3	3-13	2	0-10	5	3-23
Dublin	2013	Division 1	6	2-38	3	1-09	3	2-10	12	5-57
Dublin	2014	Division 1	3	1-11	2	1-07	2	1-09	7	3-27
Dublin	2015	Division 1	7	2-08	3	4-10	4	2-11	14	8-29
Dublin	2016	Division 1	5	1-07	4	1-07	3	0-03	12	2-17
Dublin	2017	Division 1	4	1-04	3	0-09	2	0-00	9	1-13
Dublin	2018	Division 1	1	0-01	0	0-00	0	0-00	1	0-01
Dublin	2019	Division 1	1	0-00	0	0-00	0	0-00	0	0-00
Total			60	15-158	30	15-94	28	6-103	118	36-355

== Other Ventures ==
In October 2012, Brogan and his cousin James co-founded Accounts for Legacy Sports and Entertainment. The Lucan-based consultancy, PR and event management firm now trades under the name Legacy.

In May 2016, Brogan, along with his father (Bernard Snr.) and brother Alan purchased the four-star Pillo Hotel in Ashbourne, County Meath. The purchase has been reported to have cost in the region of €8 million.

In June 2016, Brogan was launched as the face of the 'King of the Hill' advert for King Crisps, a play on both the crisps' brand name and Bernard Brogan's unofficial nickname given to him by Dublin football supporters.

In July 2017, Brogan launched his first clothing line in association with Littlewoods Ireland's brand V by Very. The collection launched with a total of 50 pieces. The following year, he launched his second V by Very collection, Bernard Brogan x.

In 2021, Brogan presented an episode of Shoulders of Giants, commissioned by Irish broadcaster RTÉ. In the programme, Brogan charted the life and times of the former Dublin Gaelic footballer, and later manager, Kevin Heffernan, as well as the legacy he left Dublin football. The programme aired on RTÉ on 12 December 2021.

Awards and achievements
Preceded by Paul Galvin (Kerry)	All Stars Footballer of the Year; 2010	Succeeded by Alan Brogan (Dublin)
Preceded by Paul Galvin (Kerry)	Texaco Footballer of the Year; 2010	Succeeded by Alan Brogan (Dublin)
Preceded by Paul Galvin (Kerry)	GPA Footballer of the Year; 2010	Succeeded by Alan Brogan
Preceded by Michael Murphy (Donegal)	All-Ireland SFC final Man of the Match; 2013	Succeeded by Paul Murphy; Kerry
