= St. Finan's Hospital =

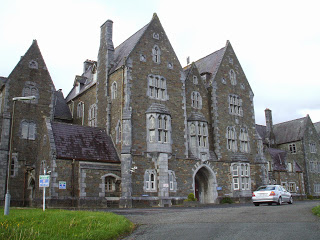
- St. Finan's Hospital

- Shown in Ireland

Geography
- Location: Killarney, County Kerry, Ireland
- Coordinates: 52.06727°N 9.51103°W

Organisation
- Type: Specialist

Services
- Speciality: Psychiatric hospital

History
- Founded: 1852
- Closed: 2012

St. Finan's Hospital (Irish: Ospidéal Naomh Fionnáin) is a psychiatric hospital in Killarney, County Kerry, Ireland.

== History ==
The hospital, which was designed by Thomas Deane, opened as the Killarney Asylum in 1852. After it became Killarney Mental Hospital in the 1920s, the head psychiatrist, Dr Eamon O’Sullivan, encouraged and trained patients to take part in local sporting activities. He initiated the competition for the Corn Uí Mhuirí, which is the top level Gaelic football championship for secondary schools in Munster, in 1927, and the Dr Eamon O'Sullivan Cup, which is the All Ireland C Football Competition, is named after him.

The facility went on to become St. Finan's Hospital in the 1950s. After the introduction of deinstitutionalisation in the late 1980s the hospital went into a period of decline and, following the publication of a highly critical report in 2003, closed in September 2012. Deer Lodge, a modern 40-bed mental health unit, opened in the grounds of the old hospital in July 2017.

Since the closure of the hospital, several suggestions have been put forward as to what should be done with the property. Local councillor Michael Gleeson suggested the site be converted into homes for the elderly, or into a remote campus for local universities, while politician Danny Healy-Rae remarked that the buildings and grounds had "enormous potential for job creation and the development of tourist attractions". The HSE, however, stated that there had been "no further interest in the former Saint Finan’s building and surrounding lands" and in November 2019 announced plans to sell the property publicly, which was met with criticism locally.

== Hospital Life ==
According to the hospital archives, between 1900 and 1930 the average patient stay was 5.2 years, however, the longest stay was over 45 years, ending with the death of the patient. The average patient was also male, under the age of 40 and had a family history of mental illness.

Head Psychiatrist Dr O'Sullivan was a staunch supporter of occupational therapy as a treatment. As a result, many patients took part in labour outside of the hospital, with between 50 and 60 patients assisting in the construction of Fitzgerald Stadium.

A report by the Mental Health Commission in 2011 called for the closure of St. Finan's Hospital, stating that residents were forced to sleep in "rows of beds in long dormitories with no privacy" and that the washing and toilet facilities were "inadequate".

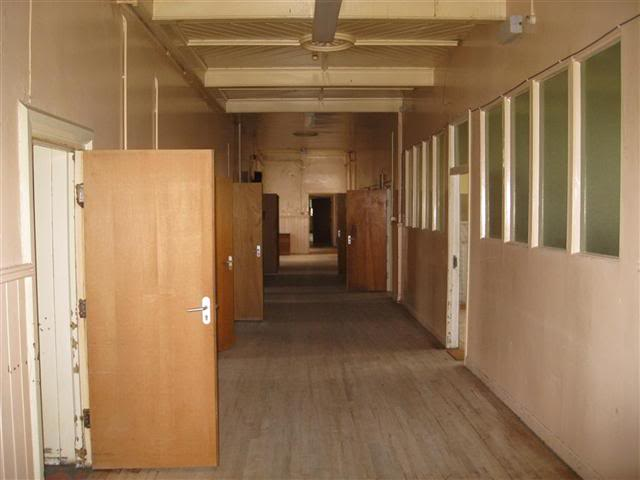
A corridor on the second floor of St. Finan's Hospital, as of 2007. At the time of its closure, much of the hospital lay unused.
