= St. Luke's Hospital, Clonmel =

St. Luke's Hospital
- Health Service Executive
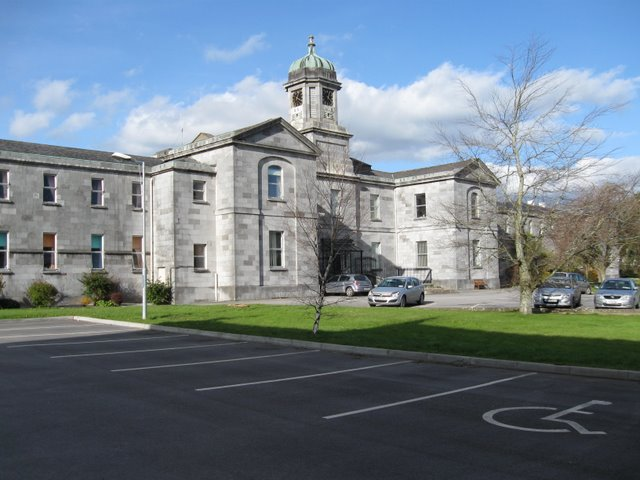
- St. Luke's Hospital

- Shown in Ireland

Geography
- Location: Clonmel, County Tipperary, Ireland
- Coordinates: 52.35443°N 7.71732°W

Organisation
- Care system: HSE
- Type: Specialist

Services
- Speciality: Psychiatric hospital

History
- Founded: 1835
- Closed: 2012

St. Luke's Hospital (Irish: Ospidéal Naomh Lúcás) was a psychiatric hospital in Clonmel, County Tipperary, Ireland.

== History ==
The hospital which was designed by William Murray, opened as the Clonmel Asylum in January 1835. It became Clonmel Mental Hospital in the 1920s and went on to become St. Luke's Hospital in the 1950s. After the introduction of deinstitutionalisation in the late 1980s the hospital went into a period of decline and, following the publication of a highly critical report in 2009, the hospital closed in December 2012.
