= Manorhamilton =

Town in County Leitrim, Ireland

Manorhamilton Cluainín
- Town
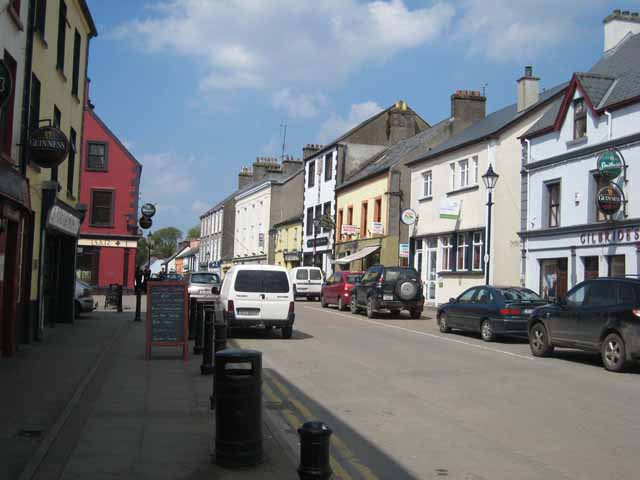
- Main Street

- Location in Ireland
- Coordinates: 54.3064°N 8.1761°W
- Country: Ireland
- Province: Connacht
- County: County Leitrim
- Dáil Éireann: Sligo–Leitrim
- EU Parliament: Midlands–North-West
- Elevation: 69 m (226 ft)

Population (2016)
  - Total: 1,466
- Irish Grid Reference: G885397
- Dialing code: +353 (0)71

Manorhamilton (Irish: Cluainín (Uí Ruairc)) is the second-largest town in County Leitrim, Ireland. It is in the north of the county, on the N16 road, 26 kilometres (16 mi) from Sligo and 41 kilometres (25 mi) from Enniskillen. Originally called Clonemullan, it was founded during the Plantations of Ireland by British colonist Sir Frederick Hamilton, who built a castle there.

== History ==
Before the Plantations of Ireland, the area was known as 'Clonemullan'. This probably comes from Irish Cluain Maoláin 'meadow of the hillock'. In Irish, the town continues to be known as Cluainín or Cluainín Uí Ruairc (meaning "little meadow of O'Rourke"). Anglicised as 'Clooneen', this is a townland on the west bank of the Owenbeg. The town was called as Baile Hamaltuin by Irish speakers and its anglicised form 'Ballyhamilton' was for a time used by English speakers.

The Uí Ruairc (anglicised as O'Rourkes) were the native Irish ruling clan of West Breifne. Their land was seized by the British Crown and granted to Sir Frederick Hamilton, a Scottish soldier and Covenanter. He ordered the building of a castle, named Manor Hamilton, in 1634. Hamilton was a very unpopular overlord and faced frequent Irish rebellion before the castle was burned by the Earls of Clanrickard (Burkes) in 1652. Because of his actions, Hamilton to this day is considered to have been a tyrant by the local people.

== Economy and culture ==
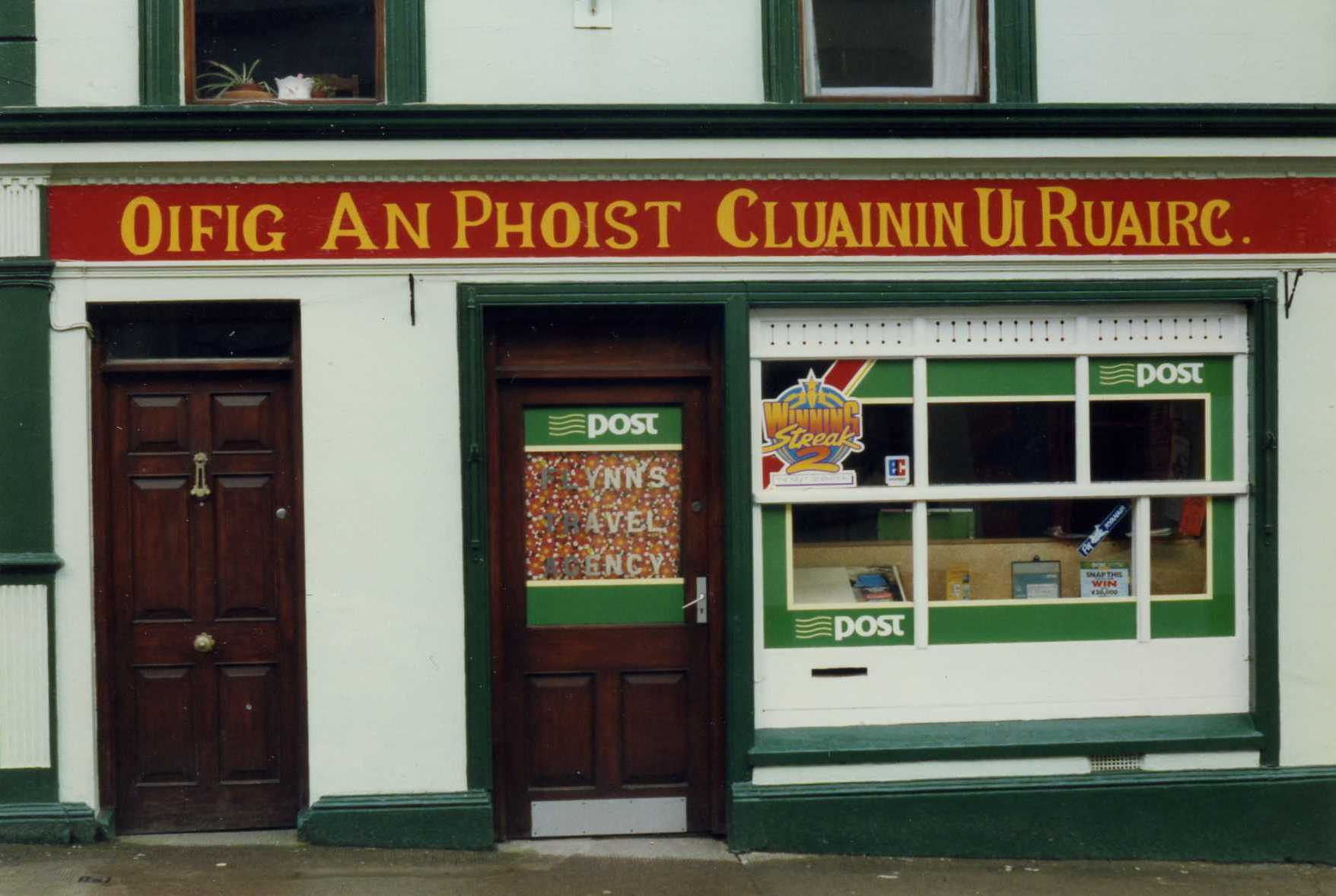
Manorhamilton Post Office

Manorhamilton acts as a retail and services catchment for the surrounding rural area. Manorhamilton is also home to several manufacturing businesses, including manufacturers of rubber, plastics, automotive and other products.

Throughout at least the 19th and 20th centuries, a number of annual fairs were held at Manorhamilton on 8 May, 1 July, 7 October and 18 November, with four annual fairs held at nearby Lurganboy on 15 (or 17) May, 21 June, 21 August, 23 September and 21 October.

Farming is still a dominant sector, yet traditional industries and livelihoods are being replaced by new forms of economic activity.

Manorhamilton has several pubs, with many hosting traditional Irish music sessions.

== Places of interest ==
=== Manorhamilton Castle & Heritage Centre ===
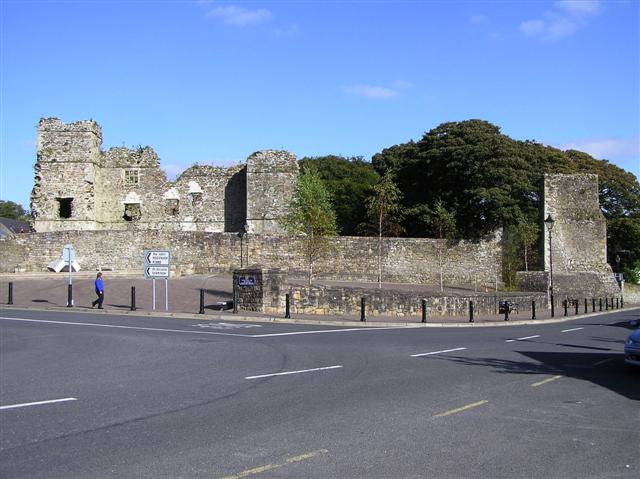
Manorhamilton Castle

The ruins of Manorhamilton Castle have been renovated and now house a heritage centre and a permanent exhibition, with guided tours of the castle ruins and grounds.

=== Bee Park Resource Centre ===
The Bee Park Resource Centre is a facility on the site of the former community centre. The centre has a large main hall which stages concerts and community events. The Bee Park Centre is also used by youth, sport, disability and childcare groups. The North Leitrim Women's Group and The North Leitrim Men's Group are also located here.

=== Square ===
A public square has been developed adjacent to Manorhamilton Castle on the former fair green. The square, which incorporates an outdoor performance platform, features an abstract sculpture, sourced from the local Leitrim Sculpture Centre.

=== Famine graveyard ===
This plot is one of three graveyards opened shortly before and during the Great Famine of 1845 - 1849.

=== Megalithic sites ===
The north Leitrim area features a number of pre-historic sites of interest. This includes the nearby O'Donnell's Rock plateau, where several well-preserved stone forts and passage tombs are located. Just off the Leitrim Way, on Tullyskeherny hill, there are two court cairns and two gallery graves. Cairns and other tombs are also visible on Benbo Mountain and at the summits of surrounding mountains. On lower ground, the remains of ringforts and cashels, tombs and other structures are dotted throughout the landscape. Lisdarush Ring Fort is an Iron Age site which can be seen near the Rossinver road approximately 2 miles (3 km) from Manorhamilton.

== Healthcare ==
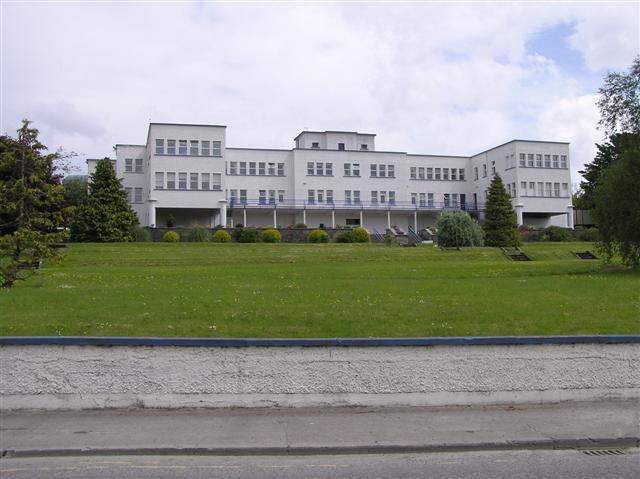
Our Lady's Hospital

Our Lady's Hospital is located on the edge of the town. This HSE hospital provides a range of services, and is focused on long-stay and day-care geriatric and rheumatology services.

== Transport ==
=== Road ===
Manorhamilton is on the N16 national primary route. This road continues across the border and becomes the A4. The R280 road links the town to Bundoran in County Donegal and to Carrick-on-Shannon in County Leitrim. The R282 road links the town to Rossinver and continues across the border as the B53 to Garrison, County Fermanagh.

The town is served by a number of Bus Éireann routes. The only daily service is route 458 which runs from Ballina to Enniskillen. Route 470 (serving Dromahair) and route 495 (to Ballyshannon) both run on Fridays.

=== Rail ===
The nearest railway station to Manorhamilton is Sligo, which is served by trains to Dublin Connolly and is operated by Iarnród Éireann. Bus Éireann services from Manorhamilton stop at Sligo bus station, which is beside Sligo railway station.

Manorhamilton previously had its own station, Manorhamilton railway station, which opened in 1880 and formed part of the Sligo, Leitrim and Northern Counties Railway (SLNCR). All maintenance on the line's engines and rolling stock was carried out at the station works, and the railway became a major employer locally. The administrative headquarters of the SLNCR was located in the nearby village of Lurganboy. The railway served as a major business and tourism artery to the area and developed a large trade in livestock exports. The SLNCR, and with it Manorhamilton station, closed on 1 October 1957.

== Sport ==
The local Gaelic football and hurling club is Glencar–Manorhamilton GAA (Gleann an Chairthe–Cluainín). The club has won the Leitrim Senior Football Championship on several occasions, including in 2019. The club's grounds are in Boggaun.

The association football (soccer) club, Manorhamilton Rangers AFC, participates in the Sligo Leitrim Junior soccer leagues. Manor Rangers pitch is located in the Bee Park sports grounds in the centre of the town.

Manorhamilton Tennis Club has all-weather courts in the Bee Park sports grounds. Teams from the club also participate in the Connacht Tennis League.

Other local sports clubs include a boxing club (Sean McDermott Boxing Club), hillwalking club (Holey Soles Hillwalking Club), and others involved in fishing, athletics, basketball, Irish dancing, table tennis and badminton.

== Media ==
Local media organisations include the Leitrim Observer newspaper, and the town and its hinterland is covered by Ocean FM radio station, which had a studio in Manorhamilton until 2017.

== See also ==
- List of towns and villages in Ireland

== Notable people ==
- Fionula Brennan (1957–2012), immunologist
- Michael Colreavy (born 1948), TD for Sligo–North Leitrim from 2011 to 2016
- John Willoughby Crawford QC (1817–1875), Lieutenant-Governor of Ontario from 1873 to 1875
- Charles Dolan (1881–1963), politician, MP for North Leitrim from 1906 to 1908
- James Dolan (1884–1955), brother of Charles Dolan, politician, TD from 1918 to 1937
- Anthony Durnford (1830–1879), British Army Lieutenant Colonel who died in the Anglo-Zulu War
- Eliza Pratt Greatorex (1819–1897), American artist, born Manorhamilton
- Charles Irwin VC (1824–1873), Irish recipient of the Victoria Cross
- John Leonard (1909–1983), Welsh politician and factory owner, later Baron Leonard, born Manorhamilton
- Enda McGowan (1946–2022), Gaelic footballer for Cavan, born Manorhamilton
- Gordon Wilson (1927–1995), peace campaigner
