= Nenagh Hospital =

- Health Service Executive
- Shown in Ireland

Geography
- Location: Nenagh, County Tipperary, Ireland
- Coordinates: 52.8577°N 8.1909°W

Organisation
- Care system: HSE
- Type: Regional

Services
- Emergency department: No Accident & Emergency
- Beds: 70

History
- Founded: 1936

Links
- Website: www2.hse.ie/services/hospitals/nenagh-hospital//
- Lists: Hospitals in the Republic of Ireland

Nenagh Hospital (Irish: Ospidéal an Aonaigh) is a public hospital located in Nenagh, County Tipperary, Ireland. It is managed by UL Hospitals Group.

== History ==
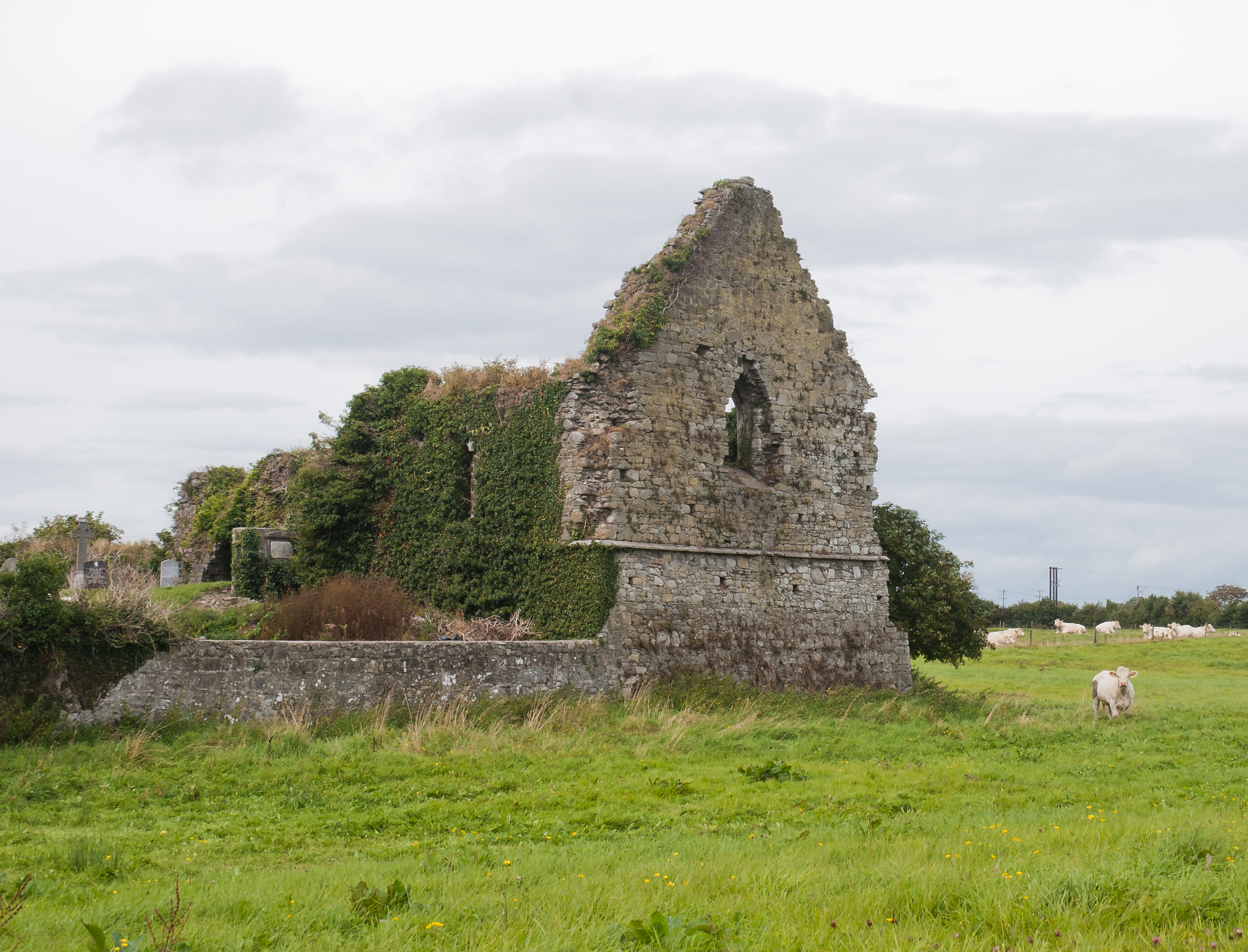
Ruins of the choir of Saint John the Baptist's Priory and Hospital, founded c. 1200

The site has a tradition of caring for sick and infirm that goes back to c. 1200 when Saint John the Baptist's Priory and Hospital was founded by Theobald Butler for the Fratres Cruciferi, an order of Augustinian canons. The priory was secularized in 1541 and finally dissolved in 1551. The remaining ruins are to be found south-east of the hospital, at the graveyard close to the Neagh River, short before the Tyone Bridge.

The Nenagh Union Workhouse and Infirmary, which was designed by George Wilkinson, was opened on the site in 1841. The workhouse was burnt down by Irish republicans in February 1923.

A modern medical facility, designed in the International Style and built on the same site, was officially opened by Seán T. O'Kelly, Vice-President of the Executive Council and Minister for Local Government and Public Health as St Joseph's Hospital on 30 September 1936. It became the Mid-Western Regional Hospital, Nenagh in 2004.

In February 2009, Government plans to move certain services from Nenagh to the Mid-Western Regional Hospital, Limerick were met with protests from healthcare professionals, local residents and several local businesses including the Abbey Court Hotel and a 4,000-person public demonstration. While there would still be 24-hour access for patients referred by GPs, all surgical emergencies would be dealt with in Limerick. The changes would mean an estimated 10 extra admissions per night at the emergency department at Limerick. The 24-hour accident & emergency service at Nenagh Hospital ceased in April 2009. However a new surgical day unit was subsequently established at the Nenagh Hospital in order to take pressure off the hospital at Limerick.

It was renamed Nenagh Hospital in 2013 when the hospitals in the greater Mid-West Region became part of a single operating and governance structure known as the UL Hospitals Group.

== Services ==
The hospital provides 70 beds, of which 49 are in-patient beds, while 21 are reserved for day cases.

== See also ==
- Ennis Hospital
- University Hospital Limerick
