= St. Columba's Hospital =

Former psychiatric hospital in County Sligo, Ireland

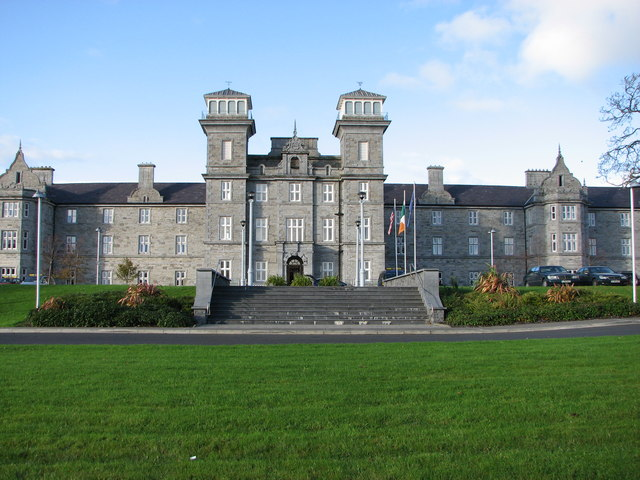
- St. Columba's Hospital

- Shown in Ireland

Geography
- Location: Sligo, County Sligo, Ireland
- Coordinates: 54.28174°N 8.46134°W

Organisation
- Type: Specialist

Services
- Speciality: Psychiatric hospital

History
- Founded: 1855
- Closed: 1992

St. Columba's Hospital (Irish: Ospidéal Naomh Colm Cille) is a former psychiatric hospital in Sligo, County Sligo, Ireland. Opened in 1855 as the Sligo Asylum, it later grew to house over 1,000 patients. As mental hospitals began to close in the late twentieth century, it went into decline. It closed in the 1990s and was subsequently redeveloped as a hotel.

== History ==
The hospital, designed by William Deane Butler in the Elizabethan style, opened as the Sligo Asylum in 1855 at a cost of £53,199. The institution expanded during the late nineteenth and early twentieth centuries, with 687 patients recorded in 1906. Patient numbers eventually peaked at over 1,000. It later became Sligo Mental Hospital in the 1920s and St. Columba's Hospital in the 1950s.

Following the introduction of deinstitutionalisation in the late 1980s, the hospital entered a period of decline and closed in 1992. The site was subsequently redeveloped, reopening as a hotel in 2005 and later operating as the Clayton Hotel.

== Architecture ==
The hospital is a detached, multi-bay, three-storey over basement stone building, constructed in the early 1850s. The south-facing front elevation is symmetrically arranged, with a projecting central block flanked by towers and extended by a series of wings.

The building is constructed of coursed rubble limestone with ashlar dressings and features pitched slate roofs with limestone chimneys. It also includes moulded cornices and Dutch gables, with a central entrance set within an ashlar portico with a round-headed arch. The central section has campanile-style towers with pyramidal roofs and wrought-iron detailing. The complex extends to the sides and rear and stands on an elevated site overlooking Sligo.

== Patients and operation ==
Like many nineteenth-century Irish asylums, St. Columba's Hospital functioned as both a place of treatment and long-term care, with all admissions legally classified as involuntary. The use of physical restraints was largely discontinued at the hospital by 1883, allowing patients to move freely within the buildings and grounds. Despite its size, staffing levels remained limited; in 1906, the asylum had one resident medical superintendent and a single assistant medical officer overseeing hundreds of patients.

The hospital also formed part of local social and economic life. Mental hospitals in Ireland were not always isolated institutions; families and communities used them in flexible ways depending on need. Patients were sometimes removed from the hospital during the summer for work and returned during the winter, a practice later described as “wintering in.” For much of the period, medical certification was not strictly required for committal, and surviving records indicate that doctors often encouraged the discharge of patients where possible.
