= St. Mary's Health Campus =

- Health Service Executive
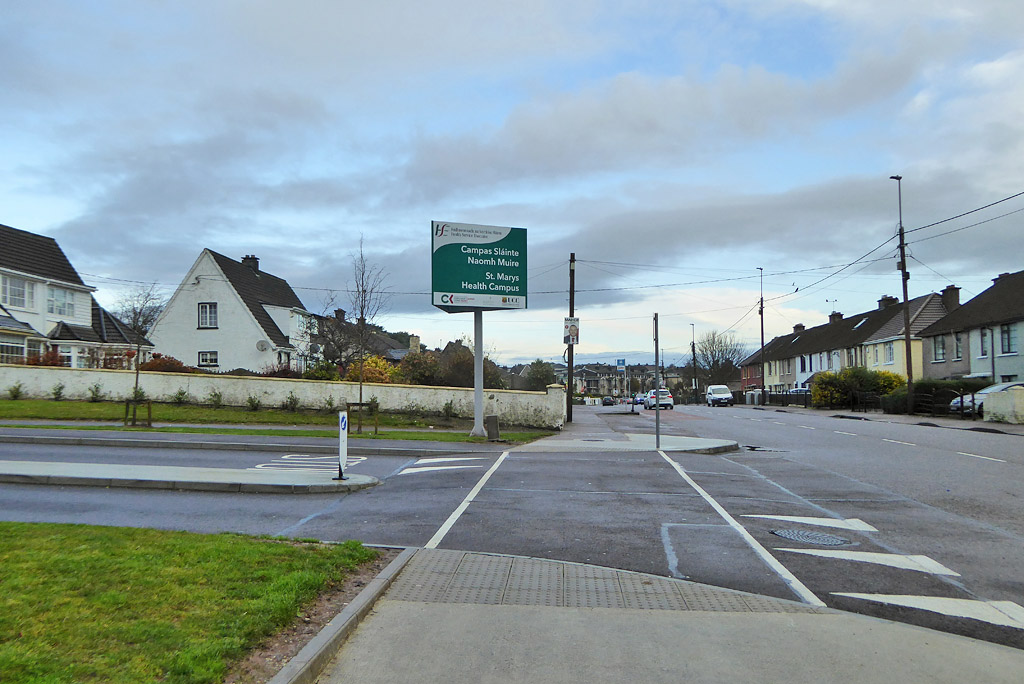
- Entrance to St. Mary's Health Campus on Bakers Road, Gurranabraher

- Shown in Ireland

Geography
- Location: Gurranabraher, Cork, County Cork, Ireland
- Coordinates: 51°54′21″N 8°29′45″W

Organisation
- Care system: HSE
- Type: Regional
- Affiliated university: University College Cork

Services
- Emergency department: No
- Beds: 91

History
- Founded: 1955

St. Mary's Health Campus (Irish: Campas Sláinte Naomh Muire) is a health facility located at Gurranabraher in Cork, Ireland.

== History ==
The hospital was commissioned in response to concerns about a fever outbreak and opened in November 1955. The hospital developed a specialism in orthopedic surgery and, as St. Mary's Orthopaedic Hospital, it became the first hospital in Ireland to undertake hip replacement surgery in 1970. Construction on a new community nursing unit at the site started in August 2008. After orthopaedic services at St Mary's were transferred to the South Infirmary-Victoria University Hospital in 2011, an urgent care centre was established at St Mary's in 2012. Around the same time the facility became known as St. Mary's Health Campus.

== See also ==
- Cork University Hospital
- Mallow General Hospital
