= Our Lady's Hospital, Manorhamilton =

Our Lady's Hospital
- Health Service Executive
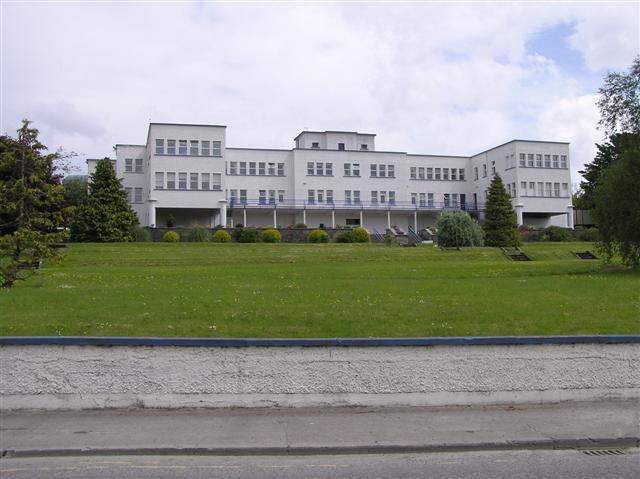
- Our Lady's Hospital

- Shown in Ireland

Geography
- Location: Manorhamilton, County Leitrim, Ireland
- Coordinates: 54.3033°N 8.1686°W

Organisation
- Type: General

History
- Founded: 1954

Our Lady's Hospital (Irish: Ospidéal Mhuire, Manorhamilton) is a health facility located in Manorhamilton, County Leitrim, Ireland. It is managed by Saolta University Health Care Group.

== History ==
The facility, which was commissioned to replace the Surgical Hospital, Manorhamilton, opened in July 1954. It was the largest building constructed in the town since Manorhamilton Castle. After new x-ray equipment was ordered for the hospital, x-ray services, which had been temporarily suspended, were scheduled to resume in October 2019 but staffing shortages led to further delays.

== Services ==
The Regional Rheumatology Centre is based at the hospital.
