= St. Fintan's Hospital =

Psychiatric hospital in County Laois, Ireland

- Health Service Executive
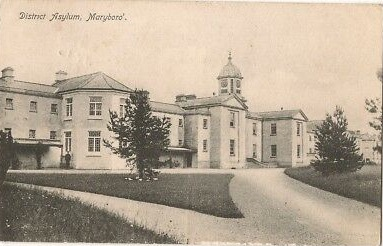
- St. Fintan's Hospital

- Shown in Ireland

Geography
- Location: Portlaoise, County Laois, Ireland
- Coordinates: 53.03571°N 7.28458°W

Organisation
- Care system: HSE
- Type: Specialist

Services
- Speciality: Psychiatric hospital

History
- Founded: 1833

St. Fintan's Hospital (Irish: Ospidéal Naomh Fintan) is a psychiatric hospital in Portlaoise, County Laois, Ireland.

== History ==
The hospital, which was designed by William Murphy, opened as the Maryborough Asylum in 1833. It was extended in 1865 and again in 1898. It became Portlaoise Mental Hospital in the 1920s and went on to become St. Fintan's Hospital in the 1950s. In the 1950s and 1960s the hospital's own football team, St. Fintan's Hospital GAA, had some success in local competitions. After the introduction of deinstitutionalisation in the late 1980s the hospital went into a period of decline; however the hospital remained open and a contract was signed for major refurbishment works at the hospital in October 2018.

On 15 April 2020, it was reported that, of the 25 people in their care, 8 patients had died of Covid-19 during the Easter weekend in the Maryborough Centre for Psychiatry of Old Age at St Fintan's Hospital.
