= Croom Hospital =

Coordinates: 52.52752°N 8.71429°W

- Health Service Executive
- Shown in Ireland

Geography
- Location: Croom, County Limerick, Ireland

Organisation
- Care system: HSE
- Type: Specialist
- Affiliated university: University of Limerick

Services
- Speciality: Orthopedic

History
- Founded: 1852

Links
- Website: www.hse.ie/eng/services/list/3/acutehospitals/hospitals/ulh/hospitals/ortho/

Croom Hospital (Irish: Ospidéal Croom) is an orthopaedic hospital in Croom, County Limerick, Ireland. It is managed by UL Hospitals Group.

== History ==
The hospital has its origins in the Croom Workhouse and Infirmary which was designed by George Wilkinson and opened in 1852. It became Croom County Hospital in 1924, St Nessan's Orthopedic Hospital in 1956 and the Mid-Western Regional Orthopedic Hospital in 2006. Following the establishment of the Graduate Medical School at the University of Limerick, it became the Croom Hospital in 2013 when the hospitals in the greater Mid-West Region became part of a single operating and governance structure known as the UL Hospitals Group.
