= Our Lady's Hospital, Ennis =

Former psychiatric hospital in County Clare, Ireland

Our Lady's Hospital
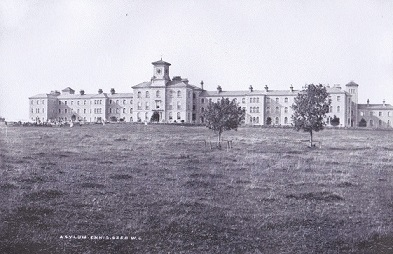
- Our Lady's Hospital

- Shown in Ireland

Geography
- Location: Ennis, County Clare, Ireland
- Coordinates: 52.86003°N 8.97882°W

Organisation
- Type: Specialist

Services
- Speciality: Psychiatric hospital

History
- Founded: 1868
- Closed: 2002

Our Lady's Hospital (Irish: Ospidéal Mhuire) was a psychiatric hospital in Ennis, County Clare, Ireland.

== History ==
The hospital, which was designed by William Fogerty, opened as the Ennis Asylum in 1868. It became Ennis Mental Hospital in the 1920s and went on to become Our Lady's Hospital in the 1950s. After the introduction of deinstitutionalisation in the late 1980s the hospital went into a period of decline and closed in March 2002. The site, which has changed hands several times since the hospital closed, was acquired by a new developer in March 2018.

In July 2026, plans were submitted for a large-scale residential development of 171 residential units on the site along with a creche and retail units at ground floor level.
