= Ennis Hospital =

- Health Service Executive
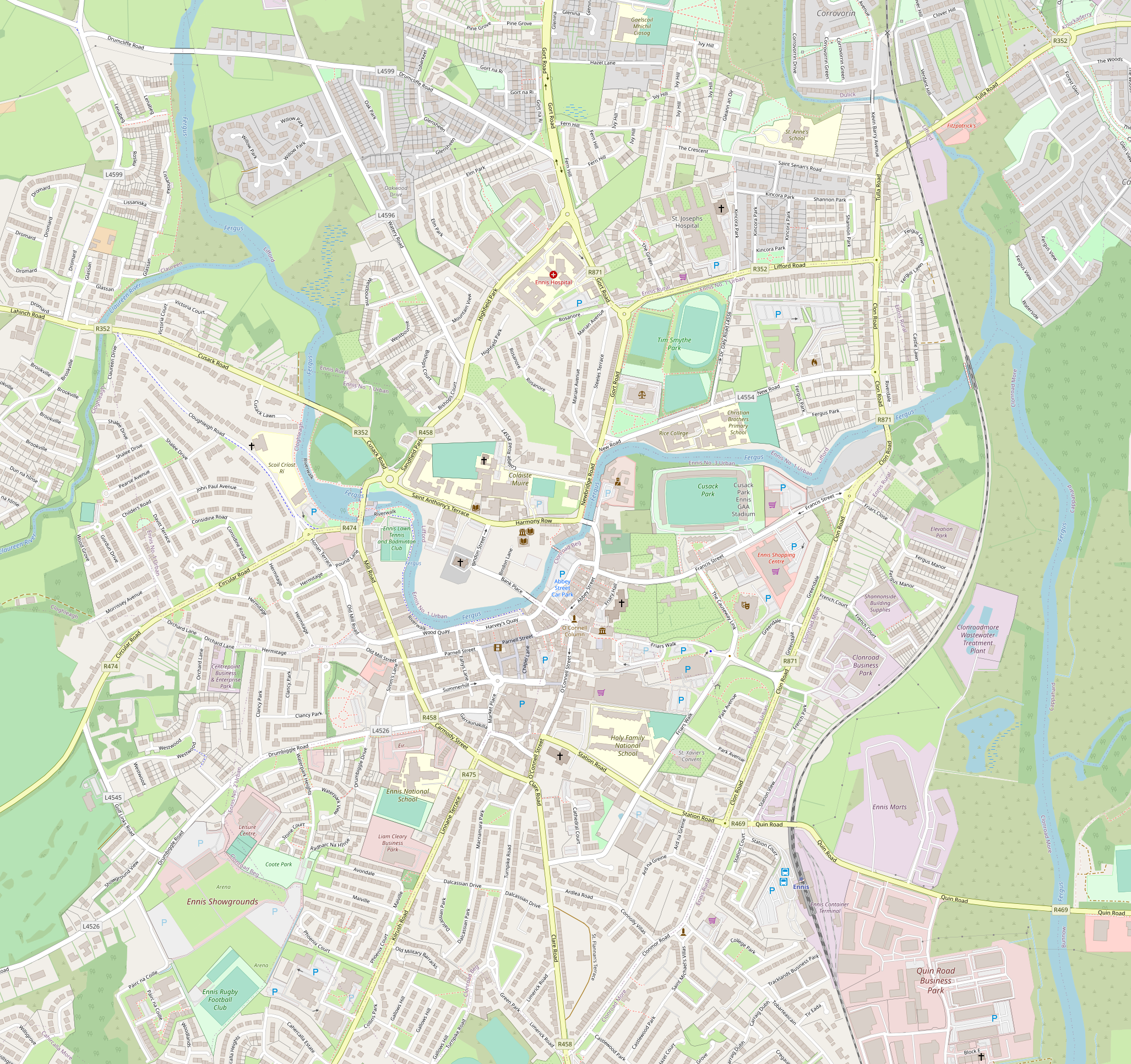
- Shown in Ennis Ennis Hospital (Ireland)

Geography
- Location: Ennis, County Clare, Ireland
- Coordinates: 52°51′3.93″N 8°58′59.4″W

Organisation
- Care system: HSE
- Type: Regional

Services
- Emergency department: Daytime only
- Beds: 102

History
- Founded: 1940

Links
- Website: www.hse.ie/eng/services/list/3/acutehospitals/hospitals/ulh/hospitals/ennis/
- Lists: Hospitals in the Republic of Ireland

The Ennis Hospital (Irish: Ospidéal Inis) is a public hospital located in Ennis, County Clare, Ireland. It is managed by UL Hospitals Group.

== History ==
The hospital was officially opened as the Ennis County Hospital on 4 October 1940. It became the Mid-Western Regional Hospital, Ennis in 2004. The 24-hour accident & emergency service ceased in 2009. It was renamed Ennis Hospital in 2013 when the hospitals in the greater Mid-West Region became part of a single operating and governance structure known as the UL Hospitals Group.

== Services ==
The hospital provides 102 beds, of which 96 are in-patient acute beds, while 6 are reserved for acute day cases.

== See also ==
- University Hospital Limerick
- Nenagh Hospital
