= St. Otteran's Hospital =

- Health Service Executive
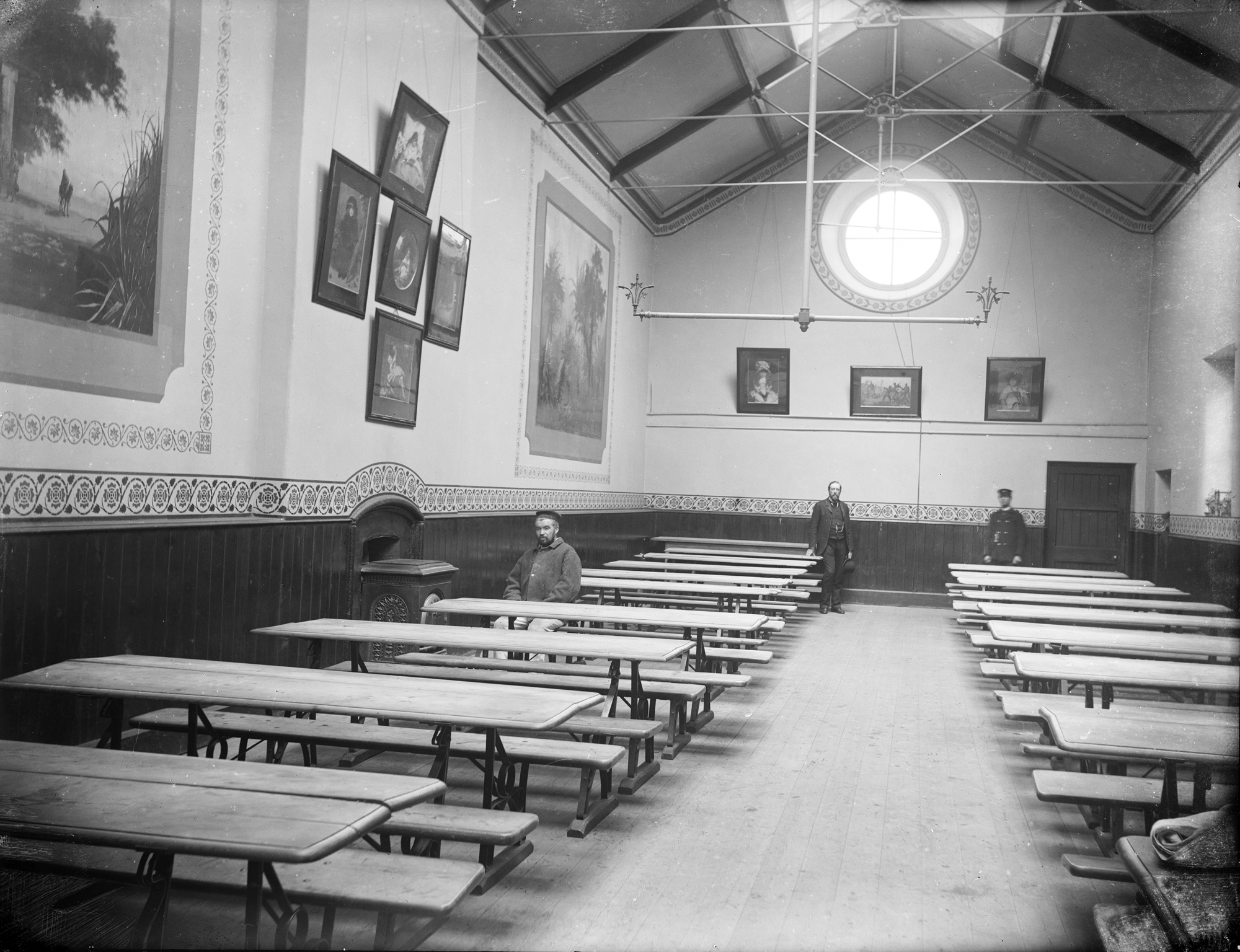
- St. Otteran's Hospital c 1880

- Shown in Ireland

Geography
- Location: Waterford, County Waterford, Ireland
- Coordinates: 52.24700°N 7.10520°W

Organisation
- Care system: HSE
- Type: Specialist

Services
- Speciality: Psychiatric hospital

History
- Founded: 1835

St. Otteran's Hospital (Irish: Ospidéal Naomh Otteran) is a psychiatric hospital in Waterford, County Waterford, Ireland.

== History ==
The hospital, which was designed by Francis Johnston and William Murphy, opened as the Waterford Asylum in 1835. It became Waterford Mental Hospital in the 1920s and went on to become St. Otteran's Hospital in the 1950s. It is named after local patron Saint Otteran. After the introduction of deinstitutionalisation in the late 1980s the hospital went into a period of decline. However, despite calls for its closure, some long-stay residents remain in the hospital and the Health Service Executive uses it as a base to provide social inclusion services.
