= National Rehabilitation Hospital (Dublin) =

- Shown in Dublin

Geography
- Location: Dún Laoghaire, Ireland
- Coordinates: 53.27498°N 6.151°W

Organisation
- Type: Specialist

Services
- Speciality: Rehabilitation

History
- Founded: 1916

Links
- Website: www.nrh.ie
- Lists: Hospitals in the Republic of Ireland

The National Rehabilitation Hospital (Irish: Ospidéal Náisiúnta Athshlánúcháin) in Dún Laoghaire, Dublin, is an Irish publicly funded hospital that provides rehabilitation treatment for patients who have a physical or cognitive disability due to illness or injury.

== History ==
The hospital was established when the Sisters of Mercy acquired a property known as "The Ceders" in Dún Laoghaire in 1916. A purpose-built hospital for the treatment of tuberculosis was completed in February 1918. The facility was initially known as "Our Lady of Lourdes Hospital" and, after converting to use as rehabilitation hospital in 1961, became the National Rehabilitation Hospital in 1994.

Although funding for an additional 120 beds had been approved in 2015, the Health Service Executive was criticised for staff shortages at the hospital which caused twelve beds to be unavailable in March 2017 in spite of a waiting list of over 200 patients seeking admission. The hospital has a total of 110 beds but is said to be under-resourced according to advocacy organisation An Soal as well as senior staff of the hospital.
