= Cork University Hospital =

Public hospital in Cork city, Ireland

- Health Service Executive
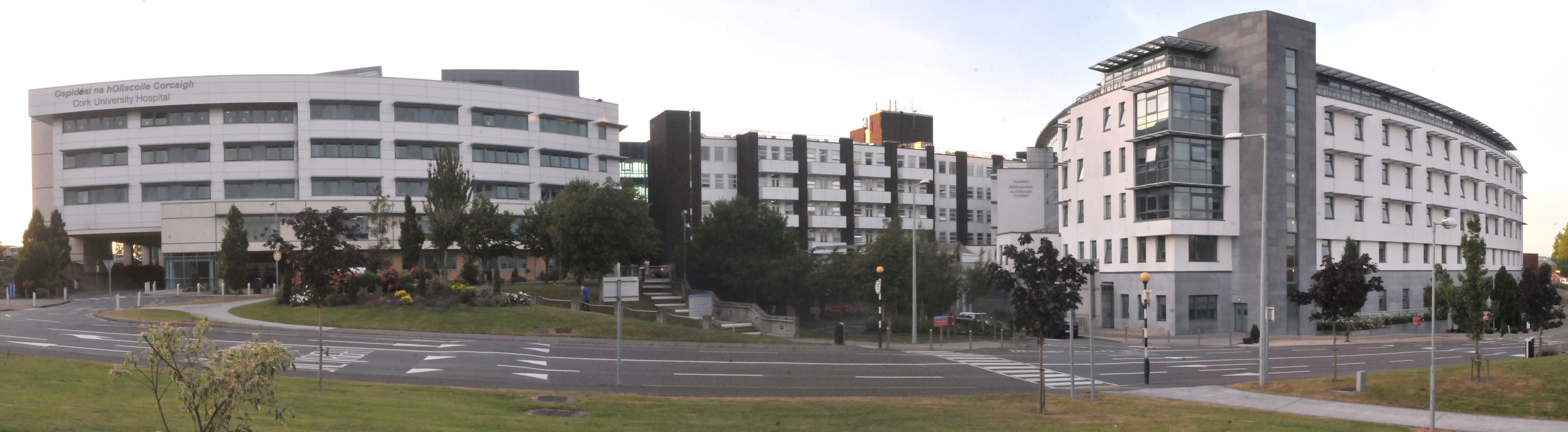
- Cork University Hospital

- Shown in Ireland

Geography
- Location: Wilton, Cork, Ireland
- Coordinates: 51.881953°N 8.510740°W

Organisation
- Care system: HSE
- Type: Teaching
- Affiliated university: University College Cork

Services
- Emergency department: Major Trauma Centre
- Beds: 800

History
- Founded: 1978

Links
- Website: cuh.hse.ie
- Lists: Hospitals in the Republic of Ireland

Cork University Hospital (Irish: Ospidéal na hOllscoile Corcaigh) is a large university teaching hospital in Wilton, Cork in Ireland. Its academic partner is University College Cork and serves as one of two major trauma centres for Ireland (the other is Mater Misericordiae University Hospital in Dublin). It is a public hospital managed by the South/Southwest Hospital Group, a part of the Health Service Executive.

== History ==
Construction of the new hospital, then called the Regional Hospital, began in the early 1970s, with then Taoiseach Jack Lynch laying the foundation stone on 27 January 1973. The hospital officially opened in November 1978.

The 144-bed Cork University Maternity Hospital opened in 2007. Work began on constructing the hospital, located in the south of the CUH site by the main entrance, in 2001. This facility brought together maternity services previously located at the Bon Secours, Erinville and St. Finbarr's Hospitals.

A new Regional Cancer Centre opened in December 2009.

The hospital's Cardiac Renal Centre, built at a cost of €85 million, opened in October 2010. It spans 13,000m^{2} and 6 floors.

In 2015 mental health services moved to a new dedicated building on the west side of the hospital campus, the 50-bed South Lee Mental Health Services Unit.

== Services ==
The hospital has 800 beds. The hospital has its own hospital radio CUH FM offering full coverage to the hospital.

Cork University Maternity Hospital (CUMH) is part of CUH.

=== Helipad ===
The hospital also receives patients by helicopter: currently helicopters land on a purpose-built helipad at the facilities of Bishopstown G.A.A. and Highfield R.F.C. near to the hospital. In 2011 it was confirmed on 6 April 2011 that the hospital would receive a new helipad costing €1.5m and, after a lengthy site selection process, a planning application for the helipad was submitted in November 2018. In March 2023 it was announced that tenders for construction of the new helipad were to be issued, with construction to start in June 2023, targeting a March 2024 completion date. It is located on the northern side of the campus. Testing of the Helipad began in September 2024 with the help of Rescue 117.

== Location and transport ==
The hospital is 3 km south-west of the city centre, by the Wilton Roundabout. A number of Bus Éireann city bus routes serve the hospital, including routes 201 and 208 (from Mayfield), 214 (from St Patrick's Street), 216 (from Monkstown via Douglas), and 219 (from Mahon). In addition, a number of regional bus routes also serve the hospital, including some services on route 232 (from Ballincollig), routes 236, 237 and 239 (from West Cork). Since Spring 2020 West Cork Connect also serve the hospital on their route to/from West Cork.

== See also ==
- Mallow General Hospital
- St. Mary's Health Campus
