= 2018 Leitrim Senior Football Championship =

Leitrim S.F.C.
- Season: 2018
- Champions: Aughawillan (12th Title)
- Relegated: Bornacoola
- Winning Captain: Sean Quinn
- Man of the Match: Gary Plunkett
- Winning Coach: Tommy McCormack

The 2018 Leitrim Senior Football Championship was the 112th edition of Leitrim GAA's premier gaelic football tournament for senior clubs in County Leitrim, Ireland. The tournament consists of 12 teams, with the winner going on to represent Leitrim in the Connacht Senior Club Football Championship. The championship starts with a group stage and then progresses to a knock out stage.

Mohill were the defending champions after they defeated Glencar–Manorhamilton in the previous years final. However the successful defence of their title was scuppered in the final when losing to rivals Aughawillan.

Aughnasheelin made their return to the senior grade after 8 seasons in the Intermediate grade by winning the 2017 Leitrim Intermediate Football Championship.

On 14 October 2018 Aughawillan claimed their 12th S.F.C. crown and first since 2016 when defeating the defending champions Mohill in the final by 0-14 to 1-9 at Páirc Seán Mac Diarmada.

Bornacoola were relegated to the 2019 I.F.C. after losing the relegation final to St. Patrick's Dromahair. Their 21 years in the top-flight of Leitrim club football spanned back to 1998.

== Team changes ==
The following teams have changed division since the 2017 championship season.

=== To S.F.C. ===
Promoted from 2017 Leitrim I.F.C.

- Aughnasheelin – (Intermediate Champions)

=== From S.F.C. ===
Relegated to 2018 Leitrim I.F.C.

- Annaduff

== Group stage ==
All 12 teams enter the competition at this stage. The top 4 teams in both groups proceed to the quarter-finals. The 5th and 6th placed teams in each group will enter a Relegation Playoff.

=== Group A ===
Team	Pld	W	L	D	PF	PA	PD	Pts
Mohill	5	4	1	0	90	59	+31	8
Aughawillan	5	4	1	0	109	68	+41	8
Gortletteragh	5	3	2	0	99	82	+17	6
Ballinamore Seán O'Heslin's	5	2	2	1	88	65	+23	5
Drumreilly	5	1	3	1	74	94	-20	3
St. Patrick's Dromahair	5	0	5	0	43	135	-92	0

Round 1:

- Mohill 0-15, 1-9 Aughawillan, 28/7/2018,
- Ballinamore 1-18, 0-6 Gortletteragh, 28/7/2018,
- Drumreilly 2-14, 2-9 Dromahair, 29/7/2018,

Round 2:

- Mohill 1-24, 0-7 Dromahair, 4/8/2018,
- Aughawillan 2-19, 2-10 Gortletteragh, 4/8/2018,
- Ballinamore 1-12, 2-9 Drumreilly, 4/8/2018,

Round 3:

- Aughawillan 0-21, 3-6 Drumreilly, 10/8/2018,
- Gortletteragh 2-12, 0-15 Mohill, 11/8/2018,
- Ballinamore 4-12, 0-8 Dromahair, 11/8/2018,

Round 4:

- Mohill 2-13, 1-9 Drumreilly, 25/8/2018,
- Aughawillan 3-13, 3-9 Ballinamore, 25/8/2018,
- Gortletteragh 5-20, 0-9 Dromahair, 25/8/2018,

Round 5:

- Mohill 0-14, 1-7 Ballinamore, 8/9/2018,
- Gortletteragh 2-18, 2-6 Drumreilly, 8/9/2018,
- Aughawillan 4-17, 0-4 Dromahair, 8/9/2018,

=== Group B ===
Team	Pld	W	L	D	PF	PA	PD	Pts
Glencar–Manorhamilton	5	5	1	0	97	52	+45	10
St. Mary's Kiltoghert	5	4	1	0	95	61	+34	8
Melvin Gaels	5	2	3	0	64	60	+4	4
Allen Gaels	5	2	3	0	76	81	-5	4
Aughnasheelin	5	2	3	0	64	72	-8	4
Bornacoola	5	0	5	0	53	123	-70	0

Round 1:

- Allen Gaels 3-14, 1-7 Bornacoola, 27/7/2018,
- St. Mary's 0-15, 0-9 Melvin Gaels, 28/7/2018,
- Glencar/Manorhamilton 2-16, 0-8 Aughnasheelin, 28/7/2018,

Round 2:

- St. Mary's 3-16, 3-8 Allen Gaels, 4/8/2018,
- Aughnasheelin 1-17, 0-13 Bornacoola, 4/8/2018,
- Glencar/Manorhamilton 0-15, 1-8 Melvin Gaels, 4/8/2018,

Round 3:

- St. Mary's 1-11, 0-7 Aughnasheelin, 11/8/2018,
- Glencar/Manorhamilton 2-22, 0-10 Bornacoola, 11/8/2018,
- Allen Gaels 0-13, 0-10 Melvin Gaels, 12/8/2018,

Round 4:

- Melvin Gaels 3-14, 0-8 Bornacoola, 25/8/2018,
- Aughnasheelin 1-17, 1-9 Allen Gaels, 25/8/2018,
- Glencar/Manorhamilton 1-13, 0-12 St. Mary's, 25/8/2018,

Round 5:

- Melvin Gaels 0-11, 0-9 Aughnasheelin, 8/9/2018,
- St. Mary's 4-17, 1-9 Bornacoola, 8/9/2018,
- Glencar/Manorhamilton 0-16, 1-8 Allen Gaels, 8/9/2018.

== Knock-Out Stage ==
=== Relegation Playoffs ===
Relegation Semi-Finals:

- Drumreilly 0-13, 0-9 Bornacoola, Cloone, 15/9/2018,
- Aughnasheelin 0-13, 2-4 Dromahair, Drumshambo, 22/9/2018,

Relegation Final:

- Dromahair 2-10, 0-6 Bornacoola, Drumshambo, 30/9/2018,

=== Quarter-finals ===
- Mohill 3-17, 0-8 Allen Gaels, Páirc Seán Mac Diarmada, 15/9/2018,
- Glencar/Manorhamilton 2-11, 2-11 Ballinamore Seán O'Heslin's, Páirc Seán Mac Diarmada, 15/9/2018,
- St. Mary's Kiltoghert 1-14, 0-10 Gortletteragh, Ballinamore, 16/9/2018,
- Aughawillan 1-11, 0-12 Melvin Gaels, Páirc Seán Mac Diarmada, 16/9/2018,
- Glencar/Manorhamilton 1-21, 1-6 Ballinamore Seán O'Heslin's, Páirc Seán Mac Diarmada, 22/9/2018, (Replay),

=== Semi-finals ===
- Mohill 3-19, 0-11 Glencar/Manorhamilton, Páirc Seán Mac Diarmada, 29/9/2018,
- Aughawillan 1-12, 2-7 St. Mary's Kiltoghert, Páirc Seán Mac Diarmada, 30/9/2018,

=== Final ===
14 October 2018; 3:00 pm Final	Aughawillan	0-14 – 1-9	Mohill	Páirc Seán Mac Diarmada; Referee: Patrick Guckian (Fenagh St. Caillin's)
