= 2026 Leitrim Senior Football Championship =

Football league season

125th Leitrim Senior Football Championship

Tournament details
- County: Leitrim
- Province: Connacht
- Year: 2026
- Sponsor: Connacht Gold
- Date: 7 August – 25 October 2026
- Teams: 8
- Defending champions: Leitrim Gaels

Winners
- Champions: Ballinamore Seán O'Heslin's (22nd win)
- Manager: Mark Henry
- Captain: Brian Banks

Runners-up
- Runners-up: Fenagh
- Manager: Mickey Graham & Martin Dunne
- Captain: Ryan O'Rourke

Promotion/Relegation
- Relegated team(s): Aughawillan

Other
- Matches played: 22
- Website: Leitrim GAA

The 2026 Leitrim Senior Football Championship is the 120th edition of Leitrim GAA's premier Gaelic football tournament for senior clubs in County Leitrim, Ireland. The tournament consists of 8 teams, with the winner going on to represent Leitrim in the Connacht Senior Club Football Championship. The championship starts with a group stage and then progresses to a knock out stage.

Leitrim Gaels are the defending champions after defeating Ballinamore Seán O'Heslin's in the previous years final to win their first ever senior title.

Allen Gaels returned to the senior grade for the first time since 2021 after winning the 2025 Leitrim Intermediate Football Championship by beating St Patrick's Dromahair. They replaced Melvin Gaels who lost the 2025 relegation final against St Mary's.

The draw for the four rounds of the league phase of the championship was made on 27 July 2026.

== Championship Structure ==
The 2026 Leitrim S.F.C begins with a league phase consisting of four rounds. The top two teams in the league phase automatically qualify for the semi-finals, while the 3rd - 6th placed teams qualify for the quarter-finals. The 7th and 8th place teams will play each other in a relegation final, with the winner retaining their senior status. The loser is relegated to the 2027 Leitrim I.F.C.

== Team Changes ==
The following teams have changed division since the 2025 championship season.

=== To S.F.C. ===
Promoted from 2025 Leitrim I.F.C.

- Allen Gaels - (Intermediate Champions)

=== From S.F.C. ===
Relegated to 2026 Leitrim I.F.C.

- Melvin Gaels

== Participating teams ==
The teams competing in the 2026 Leitrim SFC are:

Club	Location	Pre C'ship Odds	2025 Championship Position	2026 Championship Position	In championship since	Championship Titles (Pre 2026)	Last Championship Title (Pre 2026)
Allen Gaels	Drumshanbo	12/1	IFC Champions	Quarter-Finalist	2026	5	2002
Aughnawillan	Drumreilly	20/1	Quarter-Finalist	Relegated to 2027 IFC	2023	12	2018
Ballinamore Seán O'Heslin's	Ballinamore	4/1	Runners-Up	Champions	2017	21	2021
Fenagh	Fenagh	10/3	Semi-Finalist	Runners-Up	2019	5	1932
Glencar-Manorhamilton	Manorhamilton	12/1	Quarter-Finalist	Relegation Finalist	2014	7	2019
Leitrim Gaels	Leitrim	5/2	Champions	Semi-Finalist	2020	1	2025
Mohill	Mohill	4/1	Semi-Finalist	Semi-Finalist	2000	10	2024
St Mary's	Carrick-on-Shannon	3/1	Relegation Finalist	Quarter-Finalist	2005	6	2022

== League Phase ==
=== Table ===
Advance to Semi-Finals Advance to Quarter-Finals Advance to relegation play-off

Team	Matches				Score			Pts
Team	Pld	W	D	L	For	Against	Diff	Pts
Mohill	4	3	1	0	107	66	+41	7
Leitrim Gaels	4	3	0	1	63	60	+3	6
Ballinamore Seán O'Heslin's	4	2	1	1	74	74	0	5
Fenagh	4	2	0	2	81	72	+9	4
St Mary's	4	2	0	2	70	66	+4	4
Allen Gaels	4	2	0	2	78	82	-4	4
Glencar-Manorhamilton	4	1	0	3	74	74	0	2
Aughnawillan	4	0	0	4	44	97	-53	0

=== Round 1 ===
7 August 2026 Round 1	Aughawillan	2-06 (12) – (21) 0-21	Ballinamore Seán O'Heslin's	Drumreilly
19:00 IST (UTC+1)		(HT: 0-04 – 0-12)		Venue: Aughawillan GAA Club
	Pts: Jamie Plunkett 2-1, Tom Plunkett 0-5 (1tpf, 2f)	Report	Pts: Paul Moran 0-6 (1tpf, 2f, 1tp), Dillon Beirne 0-5, Keelan McHugh 0-3, Michael McBrien 0-2, Shane Moran 0-1, Luke Murphy 0-1, Andrew Burns 0-1, Brian Leydon 0-1, Shane Murphy 0-1	Referee: Patrick Guckian

8 August 2026 Round 1	Allen Gaels	3-16 (25) – (24) 1-21	Fenagh	Drumshanbo
19:00 IST (UTC+1)		(HT: 1-05 – 1-10)		Venue: Shane McGettigan Memorial Park
	Pts: Jake Tobin 2-1 (1pen), Senan McGowan 0-5 (1tpf, 1tp), Daire McCabe 1-2 (2f), Kieran Kilcline 0-4 (1tpf, 1tp), Thomas Mulvey 0-2 (tp), Ciaran McMorrow 0-1, Caleb Duffy 0-1	Report	Pts: Ryan O'Rourke 0-8 (1f), Riordan O'Rourke 1-3, Callum Andrews 0-4 (2tpf), Ruairí O'Rourke 0-3, Oisín McLoughlin 0-2 (1f), Shane Greenan 0-1	Referee: Mark McCloskey

8 August 2026 Round 1	Glencar–Manorhamilton	0-12 (12) – (13) 0-13	Leitrim Gaels	Boggaun, Manorhamilton
19:00 IST (UTC+1)				Venue: Manorhamilton GAA Club

8 August 2026 Round 1	Mohill	2-15 (21) – (19) 1-16	St Mary's	Mohill
19:00 IST (UTC+1)				Venue: Phillip McGuinness Park

=== Round 2 ===
14 August 2026 Round 2	Leitrim Gaels	0-18 (18) – (14) 2-08	Allen Gaels	Leitrim
19:00 IST (UTC+1)				Venue: Leitrim Gaels Community Field

15 August 2026 Round 2	Ballinamore Seán O'Heslin's	2-14 (20) – (20) 1-17	Mohill	Ballinamore
19:00 IST (UTC+1)				Venue: Páirc Shean Uí Heislin
		Report

15 August 2026 Round 2	Fenagh	1-12 (15) – (14) 0-14	Glencar–Manorhamilton	Fenagh
19:00 IST (UTC+1)				Venue: Fenagh St Caillin's GAA Club

15 August 2026 Round 2	St Mary's	0-17 (17) – (13) 1-10	Aughawillan	Carrick-on-Shannon
19:00 IST (UTC+1)				Venue: Páirc Naoimh Mhuire

=== Round 3 ===
21 August 2026 Round 3	Glencar–Manorhamilton	2-19 (25) – (18) 1-15	Allen Gaels	Boggaun, Manorhamilton
19:00 IST (UTC+1)				Venue: Manorhamilton GAA Club

21 August 2026 Round 3	Leitrim Gaels	1-15 (18) – (17) 1-14	Fenagh	Leitrim
19:00 IST (UTC+1)				Venue: Leitrim Gaels Community Field

22 August 2026 Round 3	Aughawillan	0-04 (4) – (38) 6-20	Mohill	Drumreilly
19:00 IST (UTC+1)				Venue: Aughawillan GAA Club

22 August 2026 Round 3	Ballinamore Seán O'Heslin's	1-15 (18) – (17) 1-14	St Mary's	Ballinamore
19:00 IST (UTC+1)				Venue: Páirc Shean Uí Heislin

=== Round 4 ===
5 September 2026 Round 4	Allen Gaels	2-15 (21) – (15) 1-12	Aughawillan	Drumshanbo
18:30 IST (UTC+1)				Venue: Shane McGettigan Memorial Park

5 September 2026 Round 4	Fenagh	1-22 (25) – (15) 1-12	Ballinamore Seán O'Heslin's	Fenagh
18:30 IST (UTC+1)				Venue: Fenagh St Caillin's GAA Club

5 September 2026 Round 4	Mohill	2-22 (28) – (23) 0-23	Glencar–Manorhamilton	Mohill
18:30 IST (UTC+1)				Venue: Phillip McGuinness Park
		Report

5 September 2026 Round 4	St Mary's	1-14 (17) – (14) 0-14	Leitrim Gaels	Carrick-on-Shannon
18:30 IST (UTC+1)				Venue: Páirc Naoimh Mhuire
		Report

== Relegation Final ==
19 September 2026 Relegation Final	Glencar–Manorhamilton	3-22 (31) – (18) 0-18	Aughawillan	Carrick-on-Shannon
15:30 IST (UTC+1)				Venue: Páirc Seán Mac Diarmada

== Knockout Stage ==
=== Bracket ===
Quarter-finals
12 September, Carrick-on-Shannon
Fenagh	0-16
St Mary's	0-11
13 September, Carrick-on-Shannon
Ballinamore Seán O'Heslin's	2-23
Allen Gaels	1-12

Semi-finals
27 September, Carrick-on-Shannon
Fenagh	3-15
Leitrim Gaels	0-20
26 September, Carrick-on-Shannon
Ballinamore Seán O'Heslin's	3-13
Mohill	2-10

Final
25 October, Carrick-on-Shannon
Fenagh	0-15
Ballinamore Seán O'Heslin's	3-14

=== Quarter-Finals ===
12 September 2026 Quarter-Final	Fenagh	0-16 (16) – (11) 0-11	St Mary's	Carrick-on-Shannon
17:30 IST (UTC+1)				Venue: Páirc Seán Mac Diarmada

13 September 2026 Quarter-Final	Ballinamore Seán O'Heslin's	2-23 (29) – (15) 1-12	Allen Gaels	Carrick-on-Shannon
16:00 IST (UTC+1)				Venue: Páirc Seán Mac Diarmada

=== Semi-Finals ===
26 September 2026 Semi-Final	Mohill	2-10 (16) – (22) 3-13	Ballinamore Seán O'Heslin's	Carrick-on-Shannon
17:00 IST (UTC+1)				Venue: Páirc Seán Mac Diarmada

27 September 2026 Semi-Final	Leitrim Gaels	0-20 (20) – (24) 3-15	Fenagh	Carrick-on-Shannon
16:00 IST (UTC+1)				Venue: Páirc Seán Mac Diarmada

=== Final ===
It was Ballinamore Seán O'Heslin's third final in a row, having lost the previous two finals. Entering their 38th final, they were hoping to add a 22nd title to their trophy cabinet and their first since 2021.

Fenagh entered their first final since 2003, and were looking for their first title victory since 1932.

It was the first time Ballinamore Seán O'Heslin's and Fenagh faced each other in a SFC final.

Ballinamore Seán O'Heslin's entered as 5/6 favourites, with Fenagh as 5/4 underdogs.

11 October 2026
15:30 IST (UTC+1)
Final

Report

Ballinamore Seán O'Heslin's	1-14 (17) – (17) 2-11	Fenagh
(HT: 0-08 – 1-05)
Pts: Paul Moran 0-5 (1tpf, 1f), Tom Prior 1-0, Dillon Beirne 0-3, Keelan McHugh 0-2, Paul Honeyman 0-1, Brian Leydon 0-1, Niall McGovern 0-1, Conor Moran 0-1		Pts: Riordan O'Rourke 0-6 (1tp), Ryan O'Rourke 1-0 (pen), Colm McLoughlin 1-0, Fergal McLoughlin 0-3, Oisín McLoughlin 0-2 (1f)

Páirc Seán Mac Diarmada, Carrick-on-Shannon

==== Replay ====
25 October 2026
15:30 IST (UTC+1)
Final Replay

Report

Ballinamore Seán O'Heslin's	3-15 (24) – (15) 0-15	Fenagh
(HT: 2-10 – 0-07)
Pts: Paul Honeyman 1-6 (1pen, 1tp), Paul Moran 1-2 (1tp), Tom Prior 1-2 (1tp), Michael McKiernan 0-1, Brian Leyden 0-1, Keelan McHugh 0-1, Dillon Beirne 0-1		Pts: Fergal McLoughlin 0-6 (2tpf), Ruairí O'Rourke 0-3 (1tpf), Riordan O'Rourle 0-2, Donal Wrynn 0-2 (tp), Oisín McLoughlin 0-1, Ryan O'Rourke 0-1 (f)

Páirc Seán Mac Diarmada, Carrick-on-Shannon

Ballinamore Seán O'Heslin's	Fenagh
