= 2019 Leitrim Senior Football Championship =

Leitrim S.F.C.
- Season: 2019
- Champions: Glencar–Manorhamilton (7th Title)
- Relegated: Aughnasheelin; Gortletteragh; St. Patrick's Dromahair
- Winning Captain: Conor Dolan
- Man of the Match: Conor Dolan
- Winning Coach: Kieran Fox

The 2019 Leitrim Senior Football Championship was the 113th edition of Leitrim GAA's premier gaelic football tournament for senior clubs in County Leitrim, Ireland. The tournament consists of 12 teams, with the winner going on to represent Leitrim in the Connacht Senior Club Football Championship. The championship starts with a group stage and then progresses to a knock out stage.

Aughawillan were the defending champions after they defeated Mohill in the previous years final. However the successful defence of their title was scuppered at the quarter-final stage when losing to the same opposition.

Fenagh St. Caillin's made their return to the senior grade after 11 seasons in the Intermediate grade by winning the 2018 Leitrim Intermediate Football Championship after a final replay victory against Annaduff. This was their first I.F.C. triumph in 44 years.

On 13 October 2019 Glencar/Manorhamilton claimed their 7th S.F.C. crown and first since 2011 when defeating Ballinamore Seán O'Heslin's in the final after extra time by 0-16 to 0-15 at Páirc Seán Mac Diarmada.

Aughnasheelin and St. Patrick's Dromahair were relegated to the 2020 I.F.C. as they were both defeated in their Relegation Semi-Finals, thus ending their respective 2 and 5 year stays in the senior ranks. Gortletteragh were also relegated to the 2020 I.F.C. after losing the Relegation Final to Fenagh St. Caillin's. Their 7 years in the top-flight of Leitrim club football spanned back to 2013.

== Format Changes ==
A motion passed by Leitrim GAA proposes to commence the restructuring of the County Championships from the end of the 2019 season as follows with the stated intention of reviewing this model at the end of the 2021 season with a clear view towards proposing a further reduction of teams at each championship grades at the higher levels depending on standards of play and competitiveness.

The draw for the 2019 Senior Football Championship will consist of two seeded groups of six teams as follows:

- Pot A: 2018 Finalists (2 Teams);
- Pot B: 2018 Beaten Semi-Finalists (2 Teams);
- Pot C: 2018 Beaten Quarter-Finalists (4 Teams);
- Pot D: 2018 Remaining 3 Teams plus I.F.C. Champions 2018 (4 Teams).

The top four teams in Group A and B will contest the quarter-finals in the following format: 1st -vs- 4th; 2nd -vs- 3rd; 3rd -vs- 2nd; 4th -vs- 1st. Competitions will conclude with an open draw for the semi-finals and Final.

Teams who finish in 5th and 6th places in Group A and B will play two Relegation Semi-Finals (5th -vs- 6th across respective groups). Defeated Semi-Finalists will be relegated to the 2020 I.F.C. The two winning Semi-Finalists will contest the Relegation Final with defeated team also suffering relegation. Hence, three teams will be relegated to I.F.C. for 2020.

These format changes leave a net result of 10 teams in the S.F.C. for 2020 to be played in two groups of five teams.

== Team changes ==
The following teams have changed division since the 2018 championship season.

=== To S.F.C. ===
Promoted from 2018 Leitrim I.F.C.

- Fenagh St. Caillin's – (Intermediate Champions)

=== From S.F.C. ===
Relegated to 2019 Leitrim I.F.C.

- Bornacoola

== Group stage ==
All 12 teams enter the competition at this stage. The top 4 teams in both groups proceed to the quarter-finals. The 5th and 6th placed teams in each group will enter a Relegation Playoff.

=== Group A ===
Team	Pld	W	L	D	PF	PA	PD	Pts
Glencar–Manorhamilton	5	4	1	0	107	52	+55	8
Mohill	5	4	1	0	103	77	+26	8
Melvin Gaels	5	3	2	0	81	67	+14	6
Drumreilly	5	2	3	1	78	82	-4	4
Gortletteragh	5	1	4	1	66	129	-63	2
Fenagh St. Caillin's	5	1	4	0	72	100	-28	2

Round 1:

- Glencar/Manorhamilton 2-17, 2-5 Fenagh St. Caillin's, 27/7/2019,
- Mohill 3-9, 0-8 Melvin Gaels, 27/7/2019,
- Drumreilly 1-13, 0-12 Gortletteragh, 27/7/2019,

Round 2:

- Glencar/Manorhamilton 3-21, 0-5 Gortletteragh, 2/8/2019,
- Drumreilly 1-11, 2-4 Melvin Gaels, 3/8/2019,
- Mohill 1-18, 1-9 Fenagh St. Caillin's, 3/8/2019,

Round 3:

- Fenagh St. Caillin's 1-13, 1-12 Drumreilly, 9/8/2019,
- Glencar/Manorhamilton 1-20, 2-6 Mohill, 10/8/2019,
- Melvin Gaels 5-16, 1-9 Gortletteragh, 10/8/2019,

Round 4:

- Glencar/Manorhamilton 2-12, 1-9 Drumreilly, 24/8/2019,
- Melvin Gaels 0-17, 0-10 Fenagh St. Caillin's, 24/8/2019,
- Mohill 3-20, 1-10 Gortletteragh, 25/8/2019,

Round 5:

- Melvin Gaels 2-9, 1-10 Glencar/Manorhamilton, 7/9/2019,
- Mohill 2-20, 3-12 Drumreilly, 7/9/2019,
- Gortletteragh 4-12, 3-14 Fenagh St. Caillin's, 7/9/2019,

=== Group B ===
Team	Pld	W	L	D	PF	PA	PD	Pts
Ballinamore Seán O'Heslin's	5	5	0	0	108	37	+71	10
St. Mary's Kiltoghert	5	3	1	1	89	61	+28	7
Aughawillan	5	3	1	1	93	68	+25	7
Allen Gaels	5	2	3	0	75	119	-44	4
St. Patrick's Dromahair	5	1	4	0	60	110	-50	2
Aughnasheelin	5	0	5	0	42	72	-30	0

Round 1:

- Aughawillan 2-18, 1-8 Aughnasheelin, 26/7/2019,
- Ballinamore 4-26, 1-2 Dromahair, 27/7/2019,
- St. Mary's 5-15, 0-12 Allen Gaels, 27/7/2019,

Round 2:

- St. Mary's 0-19, 0-8 Aughnasheelin, 1/8/2019,
- Allen Gaels 1-14, 0-14 Dromahair, 3/8/2019,
- Ballinamore 1-12, 1-9 Aughawillan, 3/8/2019,

Round 3:

- Aughawillan 0-20, 1-9 Dromahair, 10/8/2019,
- Ballinamore 3-8, 0-6 St. Mary's, 10/8/2019,
- Allen Gaels 1-10, 0-11 Aughnasheelin, 11/8/2019,

Round 4:

- St. Mary's 0-11, 0-11 Aughawillan, 23/8/2019,
- Dromahair 1-13, 2-6 Aughnasheelin, 24/8/2019,
- Ballinamore 5-23, 1-11 Allen Gaels, 24/8/2019,

Round 5:

- Ballinamore w/o, scr Aughnasheelin, 7/9/2019,
- St. Mary's 3-14, 2-7 Dromahair, 7/9/2019,
- Aughawillan 3-17, 2-13 Allen Gaels, 7/9/2019.

== Relegation Playoffs ==
Teams who finish in 5th and 6th places in Group A and B will play two Relegation Semi-Finals (5th -vs- 6th across respective groups). Defeated Semi-Finalists will be relegated to the 2020 I.F.C. The two winning Semi-Finalists will contest the Relegation Final with defeated team also suffering relegation. Hence, three teams will be relegated to I.F.C. for 2020.

Relegation Semi-Finals:

- Gortletteragh 2-6, 2-5 Aughnasheelin, Cloone, 29/9/2019,
- Fenagh St. Caillin's 1-15, 0-6 Dromahair, Drumshambo, 29/9/2019,

Relegation Final:

- Fenagh St. Caillin's 2-17, 1-7 Gortletteragh, Páirc Seán Mac Diarmada, 6/10/2019,

== Knock-Out Stage ==
=== Quarter-finals ===
- Melvin Gaels 0-12, 0-5 St. Mary's Kiltoghert, Ballinamore, 15/9/2019,
- Glencar/Manorhamilton 6-16, 2-4 Allen Gaels, Ballinamore, 15/9/2019,
- Ballinamore Seán O'Heslin's 4-21, 0-5 Drumreilly, Páirc Seán Mac Diarmada, 15/9/2019,
- Mohill 1-16, 0-11 Aughawillan, Páirc Seán Mac Diarmada, 15/9/2019,

=== Semi-finals ===
- Glencar/Manorhamilton 0-17, 1-8 Melvin Gaels, Páirc Seán Mac Diarmada, 28/9/2019,
- Ballinamore Seán O'Heslin's 1-14, 0-13 Mohill, Páirc Seán Mac Diarmada, 29/9/2019,

=== Final ===
13 October 2019; 3:00 pm Final	Glencar–Manorhamilton	0-16 – 0-15 (a.e.t.)	Ballinamore Seán O'Heslin's	Páirc Seán Mac Diarmada; Referee: Patrick Guckian (Fenagh St. Caillin's)

== Championship statistics ==
=== Miscellaneous ===
- Glencar–Manorhamilton win their first title since 2011.
