= 2016 Leitrim Senior Football Championship =

Leitrim S.F.C.
- Season: 2016
- Champions: Aughawillan (11th S.F.C. Title)
- Relegated: Kiltubrid
- Winning Captain: Colin Maguire (Aughawillan)
- Man of the Match: Pearce Dolan (Aughawillan)

The 2016 Leitrim Senior Football Championship was the 110th edition of Leitrim GAA's premier gaelic football tournament for senior clubs in County Leitrim, Ireland. The tournament consists of 12 teams, with the winner going on to represent Leitrim in the Connacht Senior Club Football Championship. The championship starts with a group stage and then progresses to a knock out stage.

Mohill were the defending champions after they defeated Glencar–Manorhamilton in the previous years final.

Melvin Gaels made a straight return to the senior grade after just one season in the Intermediate grade by winning the 2015 Leitrim Intermediate Football Championship.

Kiltubrid were relegated to the 2017 I.F.C. after spending 14 seasons in the top flight.

On 9 October 2016, Aughawillan claimed their 11th S.F.C. title and first since 2014 when they defeated Glencar/Manorhamilton 1–10 to 0–12 in the final at Páirc Seán Mac Diarmada.

== Promoted to SFC from IFC in 2015 ==
Melvin Gaels (Intermediate Champions)

== Relegated from SFC to IFC in 2015 ==
Carrigallen

== Group stage ==
All 12 teams enter the competition at this stage. The top 2 teams in each group as well as the 3rd placed team in Group A go into the quarter-finals. 3rd placed teams in Group B and C play each other with the winner entering the quarter-finals while the loser must enter the Relegation Playoffs. The bottom team of each group will enter a Relegation Playoff.

=== Group A ===
Team	Pld	W	L	D	PF	PA	PD	Pts
Aughawillan	3	2	0	1	49	36	+13	5
Drumreilly	3	2	1	0	38	41	-3	4
Allen Gaels	3	1	1	1	36	39	-3	3
Kiltubrid	3	0	3	0	40	47	-7	0

Round 1

- Allen Gaels 2–6, 0-12 Aughawillan, 29/7/2016,
- Drumreilly 0-14, 1-10 Kiltubrid, 31/7/2016,

Round 2

- Drumreilly 3-6, 0-11 Allen Gaels, 14/8/2016,
- Aughawillan 4-8, 1-12 Kiltubrid, 14/8/2016,

Round 3

- Allen Gaels 1-10, 0-12 Kiltubrid, 27/8/2016,
- Aughawillan 0-17, 0-9 Drumreilly, 27/8/2016,

=== Group B ===
Team	Pld	W	L	D	PF	PA	PD	Pts
Mohill	3	3	0	0	49	34	+15	6
Glencar–Manorhamilton	3	2	1	0	46	42	+4	4
Gortletteragh	3	1	2	0	32	44	-12	2
Annaduff	3	0	3	0	41	48	-7	0

Round 1

- Mohill 0-18, 2-9 Annaduff, 30/7/2016,
- Glencar–Manorhamilton 1-16, 0-10 Gortletteragh, 31/7/2016,

Round 2

- Mohill 1-9, 0-7 Gortletteragh, 12/8/2016,
- Glencar–Manorhamilton 0-15, 0-13 Annaduff, 13/8/2016,

Round 3

- Gortletteragh 2-9, 0-13 Annaduff, 27/8/2016,
- Mohill 2-13, 0-12 Glencar–Manorhamilton, 27/8/2016,

=== Group C ===
Team	Pld	W	L	D	PF	PA	PD	Pts
Melvin Gaels	3	3	0	0	59	27	+32	6
St. Mary's Kiltoghert	3	2	1	0	47	35	+12	4
St. Patrick's Dromahair	3	1	2	0	34	59	-25	2
Bornacoola	3	0	3	0	31	50	-19	0

Round 1

- Melvin Gaels 1-10, 1-6 St. Mary's Kiltoghert, 30/7/2016,
- St. Patrick's Dromahair 2-7, 0-12 Bornacoola, 30/7/2016,

Round 2

- Melvin Gaels 3-19, 1-9 St. Patrick's Dromahair, 13/8/2016,
- St. Mary's Kiltoghert 2-13, 1-10 Bornacoola, 13/8/2016,

Round 3

- Melvin Gaels 1-15, 0-6 Bornacoola, 27/8/2016,
- St. Mary's Kiltoghert 0-19, 1-6 St. Patrick's Dromahair, 27/8/2016,

== Fourth Quarter-Final Place ==
3rd placed teams in Group B and C play each other with the winner entering the quarter-Finals and the loser entering the relegation playoffs.

- Gortletteragh 2-11, 0-11 St. Patrick's Dromahair, 3/9/2016,

== Knock-Out Stage ==
=== Last Eight ===
Quarter-Finals		Semi-Finals		Final
Aughawillan	0-14
Mohill	1-10	Aughawillan	0-9
Allen Gaels	2-4	Gortletteragh	1-5
Gortletteragh	0-12			Aughawillan	1-10
St. Mary's Kiltoghert	2-14			Glencar–Manorhamilton	0-12
Drumreilly	1-9	St. Mary's Kiltoghert	0-7
Glencar–Manorhamilton	1-11	Glencar–Manorhamilton	0-12
Melvin Gaels	0-8

=== Quarter-finals ===
- St. Mary's Kiltoghert 2-14, 1-9 Drumreilly, Páirc Seán Mac Diarmada, 10/9/2016,
- Aughawillan 0-14, 1-10 Mohill, Ballinamore, 10/9/2016,
- Glencar–Manorhamilton 1-11, 0-8 Melvin Gaels, Páirc Seán Mac Diarmada, 11/9/2016,
- Gortletteragh 0-12, 2-4 Allen Gaels, Ballinamore, 11/9/2016,

=== Semi-finals ===
- Glencar–Manorhamilton 0-12, 0-7 St. Mary's Kiltoghert, Páirc Seán Mac Diarmada, 25/9/2016,
- Aughawillan 0-9, 1-5 Gortletteragh, Páirc Seán Mac Diarmada, 25/9/2016,

=== Final ===
9 October 2016
16:00
Final

Aughawillan	1-10 – 0-12	Glencar–Manorhamilton

Páirc Seán Mac Diarmada, Carrick-on-Shannon
Referee: ???

== Relegation Playoffs ==
Relegation Semi-Finals

- St. Patrick's Dromahair 2-11, 0-7 Kiltubrid, Drumshanbo, 11/9/2016,
- Bornacoola 2-11, 2-9 Annaduff, Ballinamore, 11/9/2016,

Relegation Final

- Annaduff 3-12, 0-6 Kiltubrid, Carrigallen, 25/9/2016,
