= 2017 Leitrim Senior Football Championship =

Leitrim S.F.C.
- Season: 2017
- Champions: Mohill (7th Title)
- Relegated: Annaduff
- Winning Captain: Daniel Beck
- Man of the Match: Keith Beirne
- Winning Coach: Padraic Davis

The 2017 Leitrim Senior Football Championship was the 111th edition of Leitrim GAA's premier gaelic football tournament for senior clubs in County Leitrim, Ireland. The tournament consists of 12 teams, with the winner going on to represent Leitrim in the Connacht Senior Club Football Championship. The championship starts with a group stage and then progresses to a knock out stage.

Aughawillan were the defending champions after they defeated Glencar–Manorhamilton in the previous years final.

Ballinamore Seán O'Heslin's made a return to the senior grade after 4 seasons in the Intermediate grade by winning the 2016 Leitrim Intermediate Football Championship.

Annaduff were relegated to the 2018 I.F.C. after losing the relegation final. They spent 16 years in the top-flight.

== Team changes ==
The following teams have changed division since the 2016 championship season.

=== To S.F.C. ===
Promoted from 2016 Leitrim Intermediate Football Championship

- Ballinamore Seán O'Heslin's – (Intermediate Champions)

=== From S.F.C. ===
Relegated to 2017 Leitrim Intermediate Football Championship

- Kiltubrid

== Group stage ==
All 12 teams enter the competition at this stage. The top 4 teams in both groups proceed to the quarter-finals. The 5th and 6th placed teams in each group will enter a Relegation Playoff.

=== Group A ===
Team	Pld	W	L	D	PF	PA	PD	Pts
Ballinamore Seán O'Heslin's	5	5	0	0	107	58	+49	10
Mohill	5	4	1	0	82	54	+28	8
Aughawillan	5	3	2	0	93	81	+12	6
Melvin Gaels	5	2	3	0	75	72	+3	4
Gortlettragh	5	1	4	0	48	88	-40	2
Allen Gaels	5	0	5	0	39	91	-52	0

Round 1

- Mohill 1-20, 1-9 Aughawillan, 28/7/2017,
- Melvin Gaels 1-16, 0-7 Gortlettragh, 29/7/2017,
- Ballinamore Seán O'Heslin's 2-16, 1-8 Allen Gaels, 30/7/2017,

Round 2

- Ballinamore Seán O'Heslin's 3-20, 0-10 Gortlettragh, 4/8/2017,
- Aughawillan 2-13, 0-7 Allen Gaels, 5/8/2017,
- Mohill 0-14, 1-6 Melvin Gaels, 5/8/2017,

Round 3

- Ballinamore Seán O'Heslin's 3-11, 0-13 Aughawillan, 11/8/2017, Report
- Mohill 0-12, 0-6 Gortlettragh, 12/8/2016, Report
- Melvin Gaels 1-12, 1-5 Allen Gaels, 12/8/2017, Report

Round 4

- Gortlettragh 2-8, 0-3 Allen Gaels, 25/8/2017, Report
- Aughawillan 2-18, 2-14 Melvin Gaels 26/8/2017,
- Ballinamore Seán O'Heslin's 1-14, 0-12 Mohill, 26/8/2017, Report

Round 5

- Ballinamore Seán O'Heslin's 2-13, 0-12 Melvin Gaels, 2/9/2017,
- Mohill 0-21, 2-4 Allen Gaels, 2/9/2017,
- Aughawillan 4-13, 0-11 Gortlettragh, 2/9/2017,

=== Group B ===
Team	Pld	W	L	D	PF	PA	PD	Pts
St. Mary's Kiltoghert	5	3	1	1	97	51	+46	7
Glencar–Manorhamilton	5	3	1	1	98	68	+30	7
Drumreilly	5	3	2	0	73	89	-16	6
St. Patrick's Dromahair	5	2	3	0	70	98	-28	4
Annaduff	5	2	3	0	79	84	-5	4
Bornacoola	5	1	4	0	61	88	-27	2

Round 1

- Annaduff 2-14, 0-11 Bornacoola, 29/7/2017,
- St. Mary's Kiltoghert 2-14, 0-7 Drumreilly, 29/7/2017,
- Glencar–Manorhamilton 2-22, 2-7 St. Patrick's Dromahair, 30/7/2017,

Round 2

- St. Mary's Kiltoghert 2-16, 0-9 Bornacoola, 5/8/2017,
- Glencar–Manorhamilton 1-13, 1-11 Annaduff, 5/8/2017,
- Drumreilly 2-11, 1-9 St. Patrick's Dromahair, 5/8/2017,

Round 3

- Bornacoola 2-11, 0-13 Glencar–Manorhamilton, 12/8/2017,Report
- St. Mary's Kiltoghert 4-17, 1-3 St. Patrick's Dromahair, 12/8/2017, Report
- Drumreilly 3-10, 2-10 Annaduff, 12/8/2017, Report

Round 4

- Glencar–Manorhamilton 3-22, 2-8 Drumreilly, 26/8/2017, Report
- Annaduff 1-16, 2-10 St. Mary's Kiltoghert, 26/8/2017, Report
- St. Patrick's Dromahair 2-11, 0-14 Bornacoola, 26/8/2017, Report

Round 5

- Drumreilly 2-10, 1-7 Bornacoola, 2/9/2017,
- St. Patrick's Dromahair 3-13, 0-10 Annaduff, 2/9/2017,
- St. Mary's Kiltoghert 0–10, 0-10 Glencar–Manorhamilton, 2/9/2017,

== Knock-Out Stage ==
Quarter-Finals		Semi-Finals		Final
Ballinamore Seán O'Heslin's	1-20
St. Patrick's Dromahair	1-7	Ballinamore Seán O'Heslin's	0-10
Glencar–Manorhamilton	0-14 (0-11)	Glencar–Manorhamilton	3-8
Aughawillan	1-8 (1-8)			Glencar–Manorhamilton	0-11
St. Mary's Kiltoghert	3-4			Mohill	0-14
Melvin Gaels	0-11	St. Mary's Kiltoghert	1-10
Mohill	1-17	Mohill	1-11
Drumreilly	0-11

=== Quarter-finals ===
9/9/17; 5:00 pm	Ballinamore Seán O'Heslin's	1-20 – 1-7	St. Patrick's Dromahair	Pairc Sean Mac Diarmada

9/9/17; 6:30 pm	Glencar–Manorhamilton	0-11 – 1-8	Aughawillan	Pairc Sean Mac Diarmada

9/9/17; 6:30 pm	Mohill	1-17 – 0-11	Drumreilly	Cloone

9/10/17; 5:00 pm	St. Mary's Kiltoghert	3-4 – 0-11	Melvin Gaels

9/16/17; 5:00 pm Replay	Glencar–Manorhamilton	0-14 – 1-8	Aughawillan	Pairc Sean Mac Diarmada

=== Semi-finals ===
9/24/17	Glencar–Manorhamilton	3-8 – 0-10	Ballinamore Seán O'Heslin's	Pairc Sean Mac Diarmada; Referee: Patrick Guckian; Man of the Match: James Glancy (Glencar-Manorhamilton)
9/24/17		Report		Pairc Sean Mac Diarmada; Referee: Patrick Guckian; Man of the Match: James Glancy (Glencar-Manorhamilton)

9/23/17; 17:30	Mohill	1-11 – 1-10	St. Mary's Kiltoghert	Pairc Sean Mac Diarmada; Referee: Michael McGirl; Man of the Match: Caillin Canning (Mohill)
9/23/17; 17:30		Report		Pairc Sean Mac Diarmada; Referee: Michael McGirl; Man of the Match: Caillin Canning (Mohill)

=== Final ===
8 October 2017; 3:30 pm Final	Mohill	0-14 – 0-11	Glencar–Manorhamilton	Páirc Seán Mac Diarmada; Attendance: 3,000; Referee: Brendan Sammon (Aughnasheelin); Man of the Match: Keith Beirne
8 October 2017; 3:30 pm Final	Keith Beirne 0-7 (0-3f, 1 '45), Ronan Kennedy 0-3 (0-1f), Danny Beck, Domhnaill Flynn, Keith Keegan, Alan McLoughlin 0-1 each	Report	Aaron Hickey 0-4 (0-2f), Niall Brady 0-3, Darren Sweeney, Brian McDonald, Adrian Croal, James Glancy 0-1 each	Páirc Seán Mac Diarmada; Attendance: 3,000; Referee: Brendan Sammon (Aughnasheelin); Man of the Match: Keith Beirne

== Relegation Playoffs ==
Relegation Semi-Finals

- Gortletteragh 1-12, 1-9 Bornacoola, Carrigallen, 9/9/2017,
- Allen Gaels 1-8, 1-5 Annaduff, 10/9/2017,

Relegation Final

- Bornacoola 2-12, 2-10 Annaduff, Cloone, 24/9/2017,
