= 2025 Leitrim Senior Hurling Championship =

- Dates: Nov 1, 2025
- Teams: 2
- Champions: Cluainín Iomáint (5th title)
- Runners-up: Carrick Hurling

The 2025 Leitrim Senior Hurling Championship was the 71st staging of the Leitrim Senior Hurling Championship, since its inception in 1917.

A total of two teams contested the championship. Carrick Hurling entered as defending champions, defeating Cluainín Iomáint 1–18 to 2–13.

The final was held on November 1 between Carrick Hurling and Cluainín Iomáint at Páirc Seán Mac Diarmada in Carrick-on-Shannon. Cluainín Iomáint won the contest 2-10 to 1-10 to win their first championship since 2021, and their fofth overall.

== Knockout stage ==
=== Bracket ===
Final
Cluainín Iomáint	2-10
Carrick Hurling	1-10

=== Final ===
Nov 1, 2025 Final	Cluainín Iomáint	2-10 - 1-10	Carrick Hurling	Páirc Seán Mac Diarmada
