= Philip McGuinness =

Irish hurler and Gaelic footballer (1984–2010)

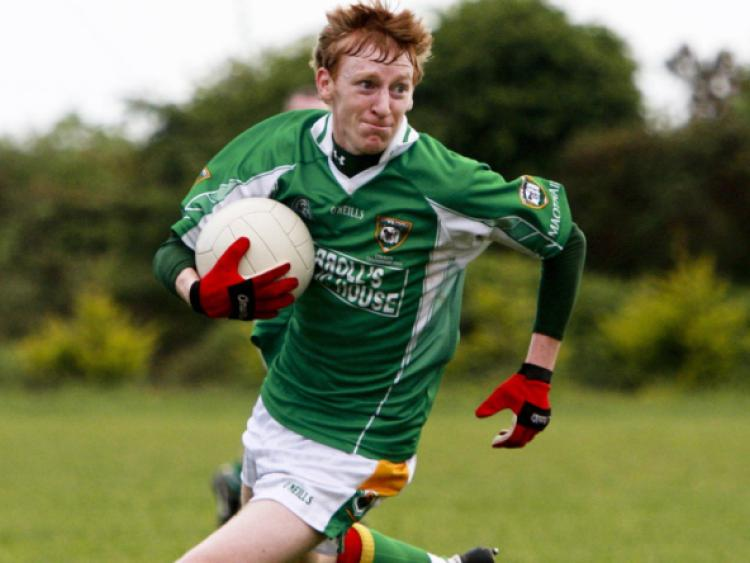

Personal information
- Nickname: Philly
- Born: 29 February 1984 County Leitrim, Ireland
- Died: 19 April 2010 (aged 26)
- Occupation: Engineer

Sport
- Sport: Gaelic football
- Position: Forward
Club
- Years: Club
- 1992–2010: Mohill
Club titles
- Leitrim titles: 1
- Connacht titles: 0
Inter-county
- Years: County
- 2003–2010 2006–2007: Leitrim (F); Leitrim (H)
Inter-county titles
- All-Irelands: 0
- NFL: 0
- All Stars: 0

Philip McGuinness (29 February 1984 – 19 April 2010) was an Irish Gaelic footballer who was a panel member on the Leitrim county team until 2010. He died on 19 April 2010 after an accidental collision in a club game in County Leitrim. Mohill GAA club renamed its home ground the Philly McGuinness Memorial Park in his honour.

== Career ==
McGuinness played with the Mohill club for his whole career and featured in their 2006 Senior Championship victory over St Mary's, the club's first title since 1971. In 2001 he was selected on the Connacht international rules football team that travelled to Australia. He also won a Connacht Vocational Schools title. In the 2009 Connacht Championship game against Roscommon he kicked two points from wing-forward. He was an accomplished hurler, and played for the county on a number of occasions in the National League, but once called up to the Leitrim football panel, he began concentrating more on the big ball game.

== Death ==
On 17 April 2010, McGuinness was playing for the Mohill club in a league match against Melvin Gaels when he sustained a knock to the head after falling on an opponent's knee. Spectators said it was five minutes before half-time when Mr McGuinness went up for a high ball and fell towards the other player and collided with his knee. He was taken to Sligo General Hospital before being moved to Beaumont Hospital in Dublin where he died on 19 April 2010. GAA president Christy Cooney paid his respects by saying "Philip’s passing is as untimely as it is tragic and our thoughts and prayers are with his family at this most difficult time".
