= 2004 Leitrim Senior Football Championship =

Tournament details
- County: Leitrim
- Year: 2004

Winners
- Champions: Annaduff (2nd win)
- Manager: Eugene Cox
- Captain: Kevin Ludlow

Promotion/Relegation
- Relegated team(s): Aughnasheelin

This is a round-up of the 2004 Leitrim Senior Football Championship. Annaduff claimed their first title in 76 years after a narrow win over another Southern side, Gortlettragh, in the final. They had dethroned St. Mary's of Carrick previously in the semi-final.

== Group stages ==
The Championship was contested by 20 teams, divided into four groups of five. The top two sides in each group advanced to the quarter-finals.

=== Group A ===
Date	Venue	Team A	Score	Team B	Score
24 July	Carrick-on-Shannon	Fenagh St. Caillin's	1-12	Cloone	0-4
25 July	Carrick-on-Shannon	Annaduff	1-11	Ballinaglera	0-7
14 August	Carrick-on-Shannon	Fenagh St. Caillin's	2-8	Glencar/Manor	0-11
15 August	Carrick-on-Shannon	Ballinaglera	1-13	Cloone	1-8
21 August	Carrick-on-Shannon	Glencar/Manor	1-5	Annaduff	0-6
22 August	Carrick-on-Shannon	Fenagh St. Caillin's	0-8	Ballinaglera	0-5
28 August	Carrick-on-Shannon	Annaduff	0-24	Cloone	1-7
28 August	Carrick-on-Shannon	Ballinaglera	2-7	Glencar/Manor	0-6
5 September	Carrick-on-Shannon	Fenagh St. Caillin's	0-7	Annaduff	0-7
5 September	Carrick-on-Shannon	Glencar/Manor	2-9	Cloone	0-3

Team	Pld	W	D	L	For	Against	Pts
Fenagh St. Caillin's	4	3	1	0	3-35	0-27	7
Annaduff	4	2	1	1	1-48	2-26	5
Glencar/Manor	4	2	0	2	3-31	4-24	4
Ballinaglera	4	2	0	2	3-32	2-33	4
Cloone	4	0	0	4	2-22	4-58	0

=== Group B ===
Date	Venue	Team A	Score	Team B	Score
24 July	Cloone	Bornacoola	1-16	Drumkeerin	0-7
24 July	Cloone	Mohill	0-12	Aughawillan	0-10
14 August	Cloone	Kiltubrid	2-14	Bornacoola	1-10
15 August	Cloone	Drumkeerin	1-13	Aughawillan	1-5
21 August	Cloone	Bornacoola	1-12	Aughawillan	1-10
21 August	Carrick-on-Shannon	Kiltubrid	0-9	Mohill	0-7
28 August	Cloone	Kiltubrid	1-11	Aughawillan	2-4
29 August	Carrick-on-Shannon	Drumkeerin	1-10	Mohill	1-9
5 September	Carrick-on-Shannon	Kiltubrid	1-9	Drumkeerin	0-8
5 September	Gortlettragh	Bornacoola	0-16	Mohill	2-8

Team	Pld	W	D	L	For	Against	Pts
Kiltubrid	4	4	0	0	4-43	3-29	8
Bornacoola	4	3	0	1	3-54	5-39	6
Drumkeerin	4	2	0	2	2-38	4-39	4
Mohill	4	1	0	3	3-36	1-45	2
Aughawillan	4	0	0	4	4-29	3-48	0

=== Group C ===
Date	Venue	Team A	Score	Team B	Score
25 July	Cloone	Aughavas	1-10	Aughnasheelin	0-8
1 August	Carrick-on-Shannon	Gortlettragh	0-10	Melvin Gaels	0-8
15 August	Carrick-on-Shannon	Aughavas	0-12	Melvin Gaels	1-5
15 August	Cloone	Drumreilly	2-17	Aughnasheelin	2-7
21 August	Fenagh	Gortlettragh	0-10	Drumreilly	1-6
22 August	Carrick-on-Shannon	Melvin Gaels	3-12	Aughnasheelin	0-5
29 August	Cloone	Gortlettragh	1-10	Aughavas	0-9
29 August	Carrick-on-Shannon	Drumreilly	2-12	Melvin Gaels	0-10
4 September	Carrick-on-Shannon	Gortlettragh	2-10	Aughnasheelin	1-2
5 September	Cloone	Drumreilly	1-14	Aughavas	0-15

Team	Pld	W	D	L	For	Against	Pts
Gortlettragh	4	4	0	0	3-40	2-25	8
Drumreilly	4	3	0	1	6-49	2-42	6
Aughavas	4	2	0	2	1-46	3-37	4
Melvin Gaels	4	1	0	3	4-35	2-39	2
Aughnasheelin	4	0	0	4	3-22	8-49	0

=== Group D ===
Date	Venue	Team A	Score	Team B	Score
24 July	Carrick-on-Shannon	Carrigallen	1-22	Glenfarne/Kilty	0-5
25 July	Cloone	Allen Gaels	1-10	Sean O'Heslins	1-7
14 August	Carrick-on-Shannon	Allen Gaels	1-11	Carrigallen	2-8
14 August	Cloone	St. Mary's	0-14	Sean O'Heslins	1-8
21 August	Cloone	Carrigallen	3-12	Sean O'Heslins	0-7
21 August	Drumkeerin	St. Mary's	w/o	Glenfarne/Kilty	scr.
28 August	Cloone	St. Mary's	2-15	Carrigallen	2-9
29 August	Ballinaglera	Allen Gaels	1-13	Glenfarne/Kilty	2-5
4 September	Ballinaglera	Glenfarne/Kilty	1-5	Sean O'Heslins	0-8
5 September	Carrick-on-Shannon	Allen Gaels	1-8	St. Mary's	1-8

Team	Pld	W	D	L	For	Against	Pts
St. Mary's	4	3	1	0	3-37	4-25	7
Allen Gaels	4	2	2	0	4-42	6-28	6
Carrigallen	4	2	1	1	8-51	3-38	5
Sean O'Heslins	4	0	1	3	2-30	5-41	1
Glenfarne/Kilty	4	0	1	3	3-15	2-43	1

== Quarter finals ==
Game	Date	Venue	Team A	Score	Team B	Score
Leitrim SFC; Quarter Final	19 September	Cloone	Annaduff	0-11	Kiltubrid	1-7
Leitrim SFC; Quarter Final	19 September	Carrick-on-Shannon	Gortlettragh	0-9	Allen Gaels	0-8
Leitrim SFC; Quarter Final	19 September	Cloone	Fenagh St. Caillin's	0-11	Bornacoola	1-4
Leitrim SFC; Quarter Final	19 September	Carrick-on-Shannon	St. Mary's	1-7	Drumreilly	1-5

== Semi-finals ==
Game	Date	Venue	Team A	Score	Team B	Score
Leitrim SFC; Semi-Final	2 October	Carrick-on-Shannon	Annaduff	1-6	St. Mary's	0-8
Leitrim SFC; Semi-Final	3 October	Cloone	Gortlettragh	0-10	Fenagh St. Caillin's	0-9

== Leitrim Senior Football Championship Final ==
Annaduff	0-7 - 0-5 (final score after 60 minutes)	Gortlettragh
Team: K. Ludlow; J. Cox; G. Cox; D. Cox; D. Duignan; D. McHugh; M. Faughnan; R. McCormack; B. Guckian; S. Beirne; T. McNabola (0-5); G. Garvey; A. Cox; R. Cox (0-1); M. Rowley Substitutes: M. Faughnan; A. Rowley; A. O'Connor; G. Newton	Half-time: Competition: Leitrim Senior Football Championship (Final) Date: Sunday, 17 October 2004 Venue: Páirc Séan MacDiarmada, Carrick-on-Shannon Referee: E. O'Grady (Drumkeerin)	Team: C. McCrann; D. Kennedy; S. Reilly; K. McGrath; M. Quinn; S. Quinn (0-1); M. Duffy; P. McGarry; C. Quinn; G. Mitchell (0-1); D. Kennedy; S. Dorrigan (0-3); P. Kane; D. Duignan; D. Kelleher Substitutes: T. Kelleher; M. Dorrigan

== Championship statistics ==
=== Miscellaneous ===
- Annaduff claimed their first title in 76 years.
