= Philly McGuinness Memorial Park =

Football ground in Mohill, Ireland

Philly McGuinness Memorial GAA Park
- Páirc Chuimhneacháin Philib Mhic Aonghusa
- Interactive map of Philly McGuinness Memorial GAA Park
- Location: Mohill, County Leitrim, Ireland
- Coordinates: 53°55′07″N 7°51′49″W
- Public transit: Mohill bus stop (McKeon's Bar)
- Capacity: 2000
- Field size: 138 m × 88 m (453 ft × 289 ft)

Construction
- Opened: 1940s as St Manchans GAA Park
- Renovated: 2010-2012
- Reopened: 2012 as Philly McGuinness Memorial Park

Philly McGuinness Memorial Park is a GAA Park in Mohill, County Leitrim, Ireland. It is the home of Mohill's football team. It was named after Philip McGuinness, a Mohill GAA player who died after sustaining a head injury in a Senior Division 1 League game against Melvin Gaels GFC in April 2011. He was 26 years old and was an ever-present on the Leitrim GAA Senior Football team after joining the panel in 2003. On one occasion Philly also played alongside his brothers John and Michael for the Leitrim Senior Team. He was also an accomplished hurler and played for the Leitrim Hurling team. He won a Leitrim Senior Football Championship with his beloved Mohill in 2006 along with his brothers, starring at full forward.

The GAA Pitch opened in the 1940s and became a very popular ground for important County games. Many times Leitrim played big games in Mohill during the 1940s and 1950s. The pitch was closed in February 2010 (two months prior to Philly's death) and was revamped and reopened in March 2012 as the Philly McGuinness Memorial Park.

== See also ==
- Leitrim GAA
- List of Gaelic Athletic Association stadiums
