= Jimmy O'Donnell (Gaelic footballer) =

Cavan and Leitrim Gaelic footballer (1940–2022)

Personal information
- Native name: Séamus Ó Dónaill (Irish)
- Born: 1940 Kilnaleck, County Cavan, Ireland
- Died: 28 February 2022 (aged 81) Galway, County Galway, Ireland
- Occupation: Bank official
- Height: 6 ft 0 in (183 cm)

Sport
- Sport: Gaelic football
- Position: Right corner-forward
Clubs
- Years: Club
- Seán McDermotts; Cootehill Celtic; Kickhams
Club titles
- Cavan titles: 0
Inter-county
- Years: County
- 1958–1962 1963–: Leitrim; Cavan
Inter-county titles
- Ulster titles: 2
- All-Irelands: 0
- NFL: 0

James K. O'Donnell (1940 – 28 February 2022) was an Irish Gaelic footballer who played for a number of club sides, including Cootehill Celtic, and at inter-county level with the Leitrim and Cavan senior football teams.

== Career ==
Born in Kilnaleck, County Cavan in 1940, O'Donnell and his family moved to Manorhamilton, County Leitrim at an early age. He first came to sporting prominence with the local Seán McDermotts club, winning a Leitrim JFC title in 1958, before later lining out with Cootehill Celtic in Cavan and Kickhams in Dublin. O'Donnell first appeared on the inter-county scene as a 16-year-old member of the Leitrim minor team that lost the 1956 All-Ireland minor final to Dublin. He was in his final year as a minor when he progressed onto the Leitrim senior football team. O'Donnell joined the Cavan senior football team in 1963 and won two Ulster Championship titles.

== Personal life and death ==
O'Donnell was educated at St Patrick's College in Cavan and spent his entire working life as a bank official with Ulster Bank. His nephew, Seán Óg de Paor, won two All-Ireland medals with the Galway senior football team. O'Donnell died in Galway on 28 February 2022, at the age of 81.

== Honours ==
Seán McDermotts

- Leitrim Junior Football Championship: 1958

Cavan

- Ulster Senior Football Championship: 1964, 1967
