= Kiltubrid GAA =

Leitrim-based Gaelic games club

- Cill Tiobraid CLG
- Founded: 1889
- County: Leitrim
- Colours: Green and Red
- Coordinates: 54°02′0.38″N 7°56′57.6″W

Playing kits
Standard colours

Senior Club Championships
	All Ireland	Connacht champions	Leitrim champions
Football:	-	-	1
Ladies' football:	–	–	2

Kiltubrid GAA is a Gaelic Athletic Association Gaelic football club in Kiltubrid, County Leitrim, Ireland.

Kiltubrid was originally founded on April 21, 1889, and was refounded 30 January 1978. The club has won the Leitrim Senior Football Championship once in 2005, beating Bornacoola on a scoreline of 4–11 to 0–07. They were runners-up in 2007, losing to St. Mary's Kiltoghert.

Kiltubrid currently compete in the Leitrim Intermediate Football Championship.

== Honours ==
Competition	Quantity	Years
Leitrim Senior Football Championship	1	2005
Leitrim Intermediate Football Championship	1	2002
Leitrim Junior Football Championship	3	1981,1989,1985
Leitrim Minor Football Championship	2	1972,1973
Leitrim Ladies' Senior Football Championship	2	2015, 2016
