= 2024 Leitrim Senior Hurling Championship =

- Dates: Oct 19, 2024
- Teams: 2
- Champions: Carrick Hurling (38th title)
- Runners-up: Cluainín Iomáint

Tournament statistics
- Matches played: 1
- Goals scored: 3 (3 per match)
- Points scored: 40 (40 per match)

The 2024 Leitrim Senior Hurling Championship was the 70th staging of the Leitrim Senior Hurling Championship, since its inception in 1917.

A total of two teams contested the championship. Carrick Hurling entered as defending champions, defeating Cluainín Iomáint 1–13 to 1–11.

The final was held on October 19 between Carrick Hurling and Cluainín Iomáint in Drumshambo. Carrick Hurling won the contest 1–18 to 2–13 to win their third straight title, and a record 38th overall.

== Knockout stage ==
=== Bracket ===
Final
Cluainín Iomáint	2-13
Carrick Hurling	1-18

=== Final ===
Oct 19, 2024 Final	Cluainín Iomáint	2-13 - 1-18	Carrick Hurling	Drumshambo
