= Columba Cryan =

Irish Gaelic footballer and manager (1929–2024

Personal information
- Native name: Columba Ó Croidheáin (Irish)
- Born: 1929 Ballinamore, County Leitrim, Ireland
- Died: 5 May 2024 (aged 94) Ballinamore, County Leitrim, Ireland

Sport
- Sport: Gaelic football
- Position: Midfield
Club
- Years: Club
- Ballinamore Seán O'Heslin's
Club titles
- Leitrim titles: 1
Inter-county
- Years: County
- 1950-1962: Leitirm
Inter-county titles
- Connacht titles: 0
- All-Irelands: 0
- NFL: 0

Thomas Columba Cryan (1929 – 5 May 2024) was an Irish Gaelic footballer. He played at club level with Ballinamore Seán O'Heslin's and at inter-county level with the Leitrim senior football team.

== Playing career ==
Educated at Blackrock College in Dublin, Cryan first played Gaelic football with the Ballinamore Seán O'Heslin's club. He captained the team to the Leitrim SFC title in 1956.

Cryan first played for Leitrim as a member of the minor team in 1947. He progressed to the junior team and won a Connacht JFC medal in 1952. Cryan was part of the Leitrim senior football team that lost four consecutive Connacht SFC finals to Galway from 1957 to 1961. He was also a sub on the Connacht team that won back-to-back Railway Cup titles in 1957 and 1958. Cryan ended his inter-county career by claiming a second Connacht JFC medal in 1962.

== Death ==
Cryan died on 5 May 2024, at the age of 94.

== Honours ==
Ballinamore Seán O'Heslin's

- Leitrim Senior Football Championship: 1956 (c)

Leitrim

- Connacht Junior Football Championship: 1952, 1962
