= Mickey Quinn =

Irish Gaelic footballer

Personal information
- Born: Aughawillan, County Leitrim, Ireland

Sport
- Sport: Gaelic football
- Position: Midfield
Club
- Years: Club
- ? - ?: Aughawillan
Club titles
- Leitrim titles: 4
Inter-county
Years	County	Apps (scores)
1981 - 1995	Leitrim	21 (2-08)
Inter-county titles
- Connacht titles: 1
- All-Irelands: 0
- All Stars: 1

Mickey Quinn is a former Gaelic footballer from County Leitrim, Ireland. Along with Seamus Quinn he is the only other Leitrim man to win an All Star award. He is also one of the finest Gaelic footballers Leitrim ever produced, Quinn won an All Star at Midfield in 1990 and at the time was only the second player to have never played in Croke Park to win one.

He won Leitrim Senior Football Championship titles in 1989, 1992, 1993, 1994 with Aughawillan. In 1990, he won an All Ireland B Titles. In 1994 he was part of the county's memorable Connacht Senior Football Championship victory. In 2010 he managed Aughawillan to the Leitrim Intermediate Football Championship.

== Honours ==
- 1 Connacht Senior Football Championship (1994)
- 1 All Ireland B Football Championship (1990)
- 1 All Star Award (1990)
- 8 Leitrim Senior Football Championships (1976, 1978, 1983, 1984, 1989, 1992, 1993, 1994)
