= Aghamore =

Village in County Leitrim, Ireland

Aghamore Achadh Mór
- Village
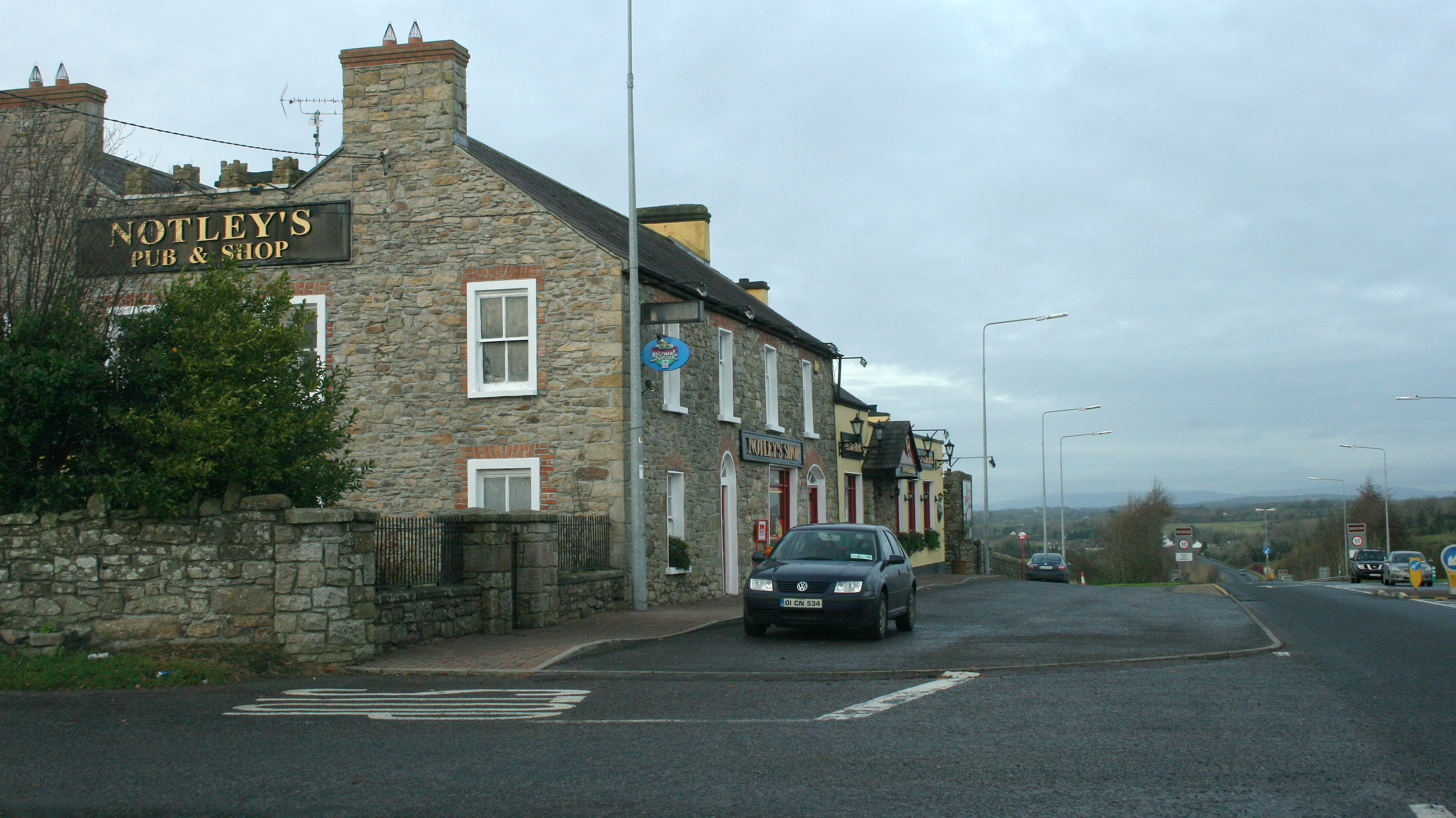
- Pub in Aghamore

- Location in Ireland
- Coordinates: 53.901°N 7.953°W
- Country: Ireland
- Province: Connacht
- County: County Leitrim
- Elevation: 72 m (236 ft)

Population (2006)
  - Total: 620
- (Electoral division)
- Time zone: UTC+0 (WET)
  - Summer (DST): UTC-1 (IST (WEST))
- Irish grid reference: N030950

Aghamore (Irish: Achadh Mór, meaning 'great field') is a townland and village in County Leitrim, Ireland. Located on the main N4 national primary road between Dublin and Sligo, Aghamore is within the civil parish of Annaduff. Aghamore has a parish church and cemetery, national school and a GAA pitch. The village also contains a few houses and a pub and shop.

== See also ==
- Annaduff GAA
- List of towns and villages in the Republic of Ireland
