= John Owens (Gaelic footballer) =

British association football manager

Personal information
- Native name: Seán Ó hEoghain (Irish)
- Born: 1966 (age 59–60) Loughinisland, County Down, Northern Ireland
- Height: 5 ft 11 in (180 cm)

Sport
- Sport: Gaelic football
- Position: Right wing-back
Clubs
- Years: Club
- Loughinisland; Connemara Gaels; Moyle Rovers; Allen Gaels
Club titles
- Tipperary titles: 5
Inter-county
- Years: County
- 1985-1986 1991 1992-1997: Tipperary; Leitrim; Tipperary
Inter-county titles
- Munster titles: 0
- All-Irelands: 0
- NFL: 0
- All Stars: 0

John Owens (born 1966) is an Irish former Gaelic footballer who played as a right wing-back at senior level for the Tipperary and Leitrim county teams.

Born in Loughinisland, County Down, Owens first played competitive Gaelic football during his schooling at St Colman's College and Clonmel High School. He arrived on the inter-county scene at the age of fifteen when he first linked up with the Leitrim and minor team before later joining the Tipperary minor, under-21 and junior sides. He joined the Tipperary senior panel during the 1985 championship. Owens subsequently became a regular member of the starting fifteen while he also lined out with the Leitrim senior team.

As a member of the Munster inter-provincial team on a number of occasions Owens never won a Railway Cup medal. At club level he is a five-time championship medallist with Moyle Rovers. Owens began his career with Loughinisland while he also won a championship medal with Allen Gaels.

Owens retired from inter-county football following the conclusion of the 1997 championship.

In retirement from playing Owens became involved in team management and coaching. He has served as senior manager of the Tipperary and Waterford county teams.

== Honours ==
=== Player ===
Allen Gaels

- Leitrim Senior Football Championship (1): 1991

Moyle Rovers

- Tipperary Senior Football Championship (5): 1995, 1996, 1998, 1999, 2000

Tipperary

- Munster Minor Football Championship (1): 1984

Sporting positions
Preceded by Séamus McCarthy	Tipperary Senior Football Manager; 2004-2006	Succeeded by John Evans
Preceded by John Kiely	Waterford Senior Football Manager; 2009-2012	Succeeded by John Evans
