= Leitrim Senior Hurling Championship =

- Current season or competition: 2025 Leitrim Senior Hurling Championship
- Code: Hurling
- Founded: 1917
- Region: Leitrim (GAA)
- No. of teams: 2
- Title holders: Carrick Hurling (39th title)
- Most titles: Carrick Hurling (39 titles)

The Leitrim Senior Hurling Club Championship is an annual hurling competition contested by top-tier Leitrim GAA clubs. The winners of the championship qualify to the Connacht Junior Club Hurling Championship.

Carrick Hurling are the title holders, defeating Cluainín Iomáint by 1-15 to 0-11 in the 2026 final.

== History ==
Records are unclear on early years for this championship. Some GAA yearbooks give Mohill as the 1904 winner and Manorhamilton Shamrocks as the 1906 winner. There may also have been competitions in 1918–1919 and again in the 1933–1934 period. Only results that can be proved conclusively are listed.

== Format ==
=== Championship format ===
Final: The two participating teams contest the final. The winning team is declared champions.

== Qualification for subsequent competitions ==
At the end of the championship, the winning team qualifies to the subsequent Connacht Junior Club Hurling Championship, the winner of which progresses to the All-Ireland Junior Club Hurling Championship.

== Teams ==
=== 2026 Teams ===
The 2 teams competing in the 2026 Leitrim Senior Hurling Championship are:

| Club | Location | Position in 2024 | Championship titles | Last championship title |
|---|---|---|---|---|
| Carrick Hurling | Carrick-on-Shannon | Runners-Up | 38 | 2024 |
| Cluainín Iomáint | Manorhamilton | Champions | 5 | 2025 |

== List of finals ==
=== Legend ===
- Gold – Connacht junior club champions
- Silver – Connacht junior club runners-up

=== List of Leitrim SHC finals ===
| Year | Winners | | Runners-up | |
| Year | Club | Score | Club | Score |
|---|---|---|---|---|
| 2026 | Carrick Hurling | 1-15 | Cluainín Iomáint | 0-11 |
| 2025 | Cluainín Iomáint | 2-10 | Carrick Hurling | 1-10 |
| 2024 | Carrick Hurling | 1–18 | Cluainín Iomáint | 2–13 |
| 2023 | Carrick Hurling | 1–13 | Cluainín Iomáint | 1–11 |
| 2022 | Carrick Hurling | 1–12 | Cluainín Iomáint | 1–11 |
| 2021 | Cluainín Iomáint | 0–14 | Carrick Hurling | 1–10 |
| 2020 | Carrick Hurling | 2–15 | Cluainín Iomáint | 0–18 |
| 2019 | Carrick Hurling | 1-20 | Cluainín Iomáint | 0-21 |
| 2018 | Carrick Hurling | 2-07 | Cluainín Iomáint | 0-07 |
| 2017 | Carrick Hurling | 3–11 | Cluainín Iomáint | 0-08 |
| 2016 | Cluainín Iomáint | 0–14 | Carrick Hurling | 0-06 |
| 2015 | Ballinamore Seán O'Heslin's | 3–10 | Carrick Hurling | 3-09 |
| 2014 | Carrick Hurling | 3–10 | Gortletteragh | 0-07 |
| 2013 | Cluainín Iomáint | 3–14 | Carrick Hurling | 1–10 |
| 2012 | Cluainín Iomáint | 1–11 | Carrick Hurling | 0–12 |
| 2011 | Gortletteragh | 3-07 | Cluainín Iomáint | 1–11 |
| 2010 | Carrick Hurling | 2-09 | Gortletteragh | 0–11 |
| 2009 | Carrick Hurling | 2–18 | Glencar–Manorhamilton | 1-09 |
| 2008 | Carrick Hurling | | Glencar–Manorhamilton | |
| 2007 | Carrick Hurling | 0–17 | Ballinamore Seán O'Heslin's | 0-08 |
| 2006 | Carrick Hurling | 2–17 | Glencar–Manorhamilton | 3-08 |
| 2005 | Carrick Hurling | | Gaeil an Chontae | |
| 2004 | Carrick Hurling | | Ballinamore Seán O'Heslin's | |
| 2003 | Carrick Hurling | | Ballinamore Seán O'Heslin's | |
| 2002 | Carrick Hurling | | Ballinamore Seán O'Heslin's | |
| 2001 | Carrick Hurling | | Ballinamore Seán O'Heslin's | |
| 2000 | Carrick Hurling | | Gortletteragh | |
| 1999 | Carrick Hurling | | Gortletteragh | |
| 1998 | Gortletteragh | | Carrick Hurling | |
| 1997 | Carrick Hurling | | Gortletteragh | |
| 1996 | Gortletteragh | | Carrick Hurling | |
| 1995 | Carrick Hurling | | Gortletteragh | |
| 1994 | Carrick Hurling | | Gortletteragh | |
| 1993 | Carrick Hurling | | Gortletteragh | |
| 1992 | Carrick Hurling | | Gortletteragh | |
| 1991 | Gortletteragh | | Carrick Hurling | |
| 1990 | Gortletteragh | | Carrick Hurling | |
| 1989 | Gortletteragh | | Carrick Hurling | |
| 1988 | Gortletteragh | | Carrick Hurling | |
| 1987 | Ballinamore Seán O'Heslin's | | Gortletteragh | |
| 1986 | Gortletteragh | | Carrick Hurling | |
| 1985 | Gortletteragh | | Allen Gaels | |
| 1984 | Gortletteragh | | Elphin | |
| 1983 | Gortletteragh | | Carrick Hurling | |
| 1982 | Carrick Hurling | 3-06 | N. Leitrim/Drumshanbo | 3-01 |
| 1981 | Null and void | | | |
| 1980 | Carrick Hurling | | St Finbarr's, Mohill | |
| 1979 | St Finbarr's | 2-06 | Allen Gaels | 1-02 |
| 1978 | Carrick Hurling | 2–10 | St Finbarr's, Mohill | 2-04 |
| 1977 | Allen Gaels | | St Finbarr's | |
| 1976 | Carrick Hurling | | Allen Gaels | |
| 1975 | Allen Gaels | | Carrick Hurling | |
| 1974 | St Finbarr's | 4-03 | Carrick Hurling | 2-04 |
| 1973 | St Finbarr's | 3-07 | St Brigid's | 2-04 |
| 1972 | Carrick Hurling | 3-07 | St Finbarr's, Mohill | 0–10 |
| 1971 | St Brigid's | 2-07 | St Finbarr's | 2-02 |
| 1970 | Carrick Hurling | | Ballinamore Seán O'Heslin's | |
| 1969 | St Finbarr's | | Carrick Hurling | |
| 1968 | St Finbarr's | 2-05 | Carrick Hurling | 0-06 |
| 1967 | Carrick Hurling | | Ballinamore Seán O'Heslin's | |
| 1966 | St Finbarr's | 6-06 | Carrick Hurling | 2-04 |
| 1965 | St Finbarr's | | Carrick Hurling | |
| 1964 | St Finbarr's | 2-04 | Carrick Hurling | 2-03 |
| 1963 | No competition | | | |
| 1962 | Carrick Hurling | | Cluainín Uí Ruairc | |
| 1961 | Carrick Hurling | | Cluainín Uí Ruairc | |
| 1960 | Carrick Hurling | | Kiltyclogher | |
| 1959 | Cluainín Uí Ruairc | | Carrick Hurling | |
| 1958 | Carrick Hurling | | St Joseph's, South Leitrim | |
| 1957 | Carrick Hurling | | Cluainín Uí Ruairc | |
| 1956 | Aughavas | | Carrick Hurling | |
| 1955 | No competition | | | |
| 1954 | Cluainín Uí Ruairc | | Carrick Hurling | |
| 1953 | Carrick Hurling | | Cluainín Uí Ruairc | |
| 1936–1952 | No competition | | | |
| 1935 | Cluainín Uí Ruairc | | Ballinamore | |
| 1918–1934 | No competition | | | |
| 1917 | Mohill | | Cluainín Uí Ruairc | |

== Roll of honour ==
=== By club ===
| # | Club | Titles | Runners-up | Championships won | Championships runner-up |
|---|---|---|---|---|---|
| 1 | Carrick Hurling | 39 | 24 | 1953, 1957, 1958, 1960, 1961, 1962, 1967, 1970, 1972, 1976, 1978, 1980, 1982, 1992, 1993, 1994, 1995, 1997, 1999, 2000, 2001, 2002, 2003, 2004, 2005, 2006, 2007, 2008, 2009, 2010, 2014, 2017, 2018, 2019, 2020, 2022, 2023, 2024, 2026 | 1954, 1956, 1959, 1964, 1965, 1966, 1968, 1969, 1974, 1975, 1983, 1986, 1988, 1989, 1990, 1991, 1996, 1998, 2012, 2013, 2015, 2016, 2021, 2025 |
| 2 | Gortletteragh | 11 | 10 | 1983, 1984, 1985, 1986, 1988, 1989, 1990, 1991, 1996, 1998, 2011 | 1987, 1992, 1993, 1994, 1995, 1997, 1999, 2000, 2010, 2014 |
| 3 | St Finbarr's | 8 | 5 | 1964, 1965, 1966, 1968, 1969, 1973, 1974, 1979 | 1971, 1972, 1977, 1978, 1980 |
| 4 | Cluainín Iomáint | 5 | 12 | 2012, 2013, 2016, 2021, 2025 | 2006, 2008, 2009, 2011, 2017, 2018, 2019, 2020, 2022, 2023, 2024, 2026 |
| 5 | Ballinamore Seán O'Heslin's | 2 | 8 | 1987, 2015 | 1935, 1967, 1970, 2001, 2002, 2003, 2004, 2007 |
| 5 | Cluainín Uí Ruairc | 2 | 5 | 1935, 1954, 1959 | 1917, 1953, 1957, 1961, 1962 |
| 5 | Allen Gaels | 2 | 3 | 1975, 1977 | 1976, 1979, 1985 |
| 8 | St Brigid's | 1 | 1 | 1971 | 1973 |
| 8 | Mohill | 1 | 0 | 1917 | — |
| 8 | Aughavas | 1 | 0 | 1956 | — |
| 11 | St Joseph's, South Leitrim | 0 | 1 | — | 1958 |
| 11 | Kiltyclogher | 0 | 1 | — | 1960 |
| 11 | N. Leitrim/Drumshanbo | 0 | 1 | — | 1982 |
| 11 | Elphin | 0 | 1 | — | 1984 |
| 11 | Gaeil an Chontae | 0 | 1 | — | 2005 |

== See also ==
- Leitrim Senior Football Championship
- Connacht Junior Club Hurling Championship
