= Leitrim Minor Football Championship =

Annual Gaelic football competition

- Irish: Craobh Mionuir Liatroma
- Founded: 1929
- Title holders: Melvin Gaels (1st title)
- First winner: Ballinamore
- Most titles: Ballinamore Seán O'Heslin's (18 titles)

The Leitrim Minor A Football Championship is a football competition between the top-tier teams in Minor Gaelic football in County Leitrim, Ireland. The Leitrim County Board of the Gaelic Athletic Association has organised it since 1929.

Melvin Gaels are the Minor A title holders (2016) defeating holders St Manchan's after a replay to win their first ever Minor A title. Lower-level teams play in the Leitrim Minor B Football Championship and up until 2012 the Minor C Football Championship, but due to rural teams amalgamating, the number of teams competing in the Minor A Football Championship has increased resulting in the removal of the C Championship.

The trophy presented to the winners is the O'Dolan Cup.

== A Championship ==
=== Wins listed by club ===
#	Club	Wins	Years won	Last final lost
1	Ballinamore Seán O'Heslin's	18	1929, 1946, 1947, 1949, 1952, 1958, 1959, 1960, 1961, 1968, 1969, 1974, 1976, 1977, 1978, 1984, 1985, 2011	2013
2	Mohill	7	1954, 1956, 1970, 1997, 2003, 2004, 2005	1999
2	St Mary's Kiltoghert	7	1965, 1988, 1991, 1992, 1995, 2001, 2010	2006
4	St Francis	6	1982, 1987, 1990, 1994, 1999, 2009	2010
5	St Manchan's	4	1983, 1986, 2013, 2015	2016
6	Garadice Gaels	3	1980, 2007, 2008	2009
6	Annaduff GAA	3	1993, 2002, 2006	2007
6	Cloone	3	1944, 1962, 1963	1951
6	Fenagh	3	1933, 1950, 1951	1943
10	Bornacoola	2	1948, 1998	1950
10	Kiltubrid	2	1972, 1973	1974
10	Drumshanbo St Francis'	2	1966, 1967, 2020	—N/a
10	Aughavas	2	1945, 1957	1948
14	Carrigallen	1	1934	—N/a
14	Tully	1	1936	—N/a
14	Eslin	1	1943	—N/a
14	Jamestown	1	1953	—N/a
14	Gortletteragh	1	1964	—N/a
14	St. Joseph’s	1	1971	1972
14	Shamrock Gaels	1	1975	1976
14	Lough Rynn Gaels	1	1979	1978
14	Eastern Harps	1	1981	—N/a
14	St Joseph's	1	1996	1988
14	GlenManor Gaels	1	2000	—N/a
14	Gortletteragh/Fenagh	1	2012	2015
14	St Felim's	1	2014	—N/a
14	Melvin Gaels	1	2016	—N/a

== B Championship ==
=== Wins listed by club ===
#	Club	Wins	Years won	Last final lost
1	Melvin Gaels	5	2005, 2012, 2013, 2014, 2015	2006
2	Kiltubrid	4	1990, 1991, 1995, 2001	2014
2	Bornacoola	4	1996, 1997, 2007, 2008	—N/a
4	Drumkeerin	3	1993, 1994, 2009	2010
4	Gortletteragh	3	1998, 1999, 2000	1996
6	Dromahair	2	2002, 2010	2015
6	Garadice Gaels	2	2006, 2011	—N/a
8	Fenagh	1	1992	1997
8	Carrigallen	1	1996	2011
8	Ballinamore Seán O'Heslin's	1	2016 (Group 1)	—N/a
8	St Mary's Kiltoghert	1	2016 (Group 2)	—N/a

== C Championship ==
=== Wins listed by club ===
#	Club	Wins	Years won	Last final lost
1	Gortletteragh	2	2008, 2011	2007
2	Aughavas	1	2004	—N/a
2	Bornacoola	1	2005	2004
2	Annaduff	1	2006	2008
2	Eslin	1	2007	—N/a
2	Leitrim Gaels	1	2009	2011
2	Glenfarne/Kiltyclogher	1	2010	—N/a
