= Lavagh =

Lavagh may refer to one of several populated places in the Republic of Ireland:

- Lavagh, County Cavan
- Lavagh, County Galway
- Lavagh (Drumahaire barony), County Leitrim
- Lavagh (Leitrim barony), County Leitrim
- Lavagh, County Offaly
- Lavagh, County Roscommon
- Lavagh, (Leyny barony), County Sligo
- Lavagh, (Tireragh barony), County Sligo
