= Gortletteragh GAA =

Gaelic games club in County Leitrim, Ireland

- CLG Gort Leiterach
- Founded: 1889
- County: Leitrim
- Colours: Green & Gold
- Grounds: Pairc Gortleitreach, Annaghmore

Playing kits
Standard colours

Senior Club Championships
	All Ireland	Connacht champions	Leitrim champions
Football:	-	-	5
Hurling:	-	-	10

Gortletteragh are a Gaelic Athletic Association club from County Leitrim, Ireland, founded in 1889. They have won Leitrim Senior Football Championship titles five times (1905, 1970, 1981, 1985 and 1987), and Leitrim Senior Hurling Championship titles eleven times (1983, 1984, 1985, 1986, 1988, 1989, 1990, 1991, 1996, 1998 and 2011). Former All Star Full Back Seamus Quinn is the club's best-known player. The club's hurling team lost the senior final narrowly in 2010, while its U14 team recently won the Leitrim Féile for the first time.

== Honours ==
- Leitrim Senior Football Championship: (5)
  - 1905, 1970, 1981, 1985, 1987
- Leitrim Senior Hurling Championship: (11)
  - 1983, 1984, 1985, 1986, 1988, 1989, 1990, 1991, 1996, 1998, 2011
- Leitrim Intermediate Football Championship: (3)
  - 2003, 2012, 2020
- Leitrim Junior Football Championship: (6)
  - 1979, 1981, 1982, 1983, 1987, 2000
- Leitrim Senior Football League: 13
  - Div. 1: 1984, 1985, 1993, 1995
  - Div. 2: 2007, 2012
  - Div. 3: 1949. 1958, 1964, 1997, 1999
  - Div. 4: 1982, 1983
- Leitrim Minor Football Championship: 8:
  - A: 1964, 1979 (as Lough Rynn Gaels), 2012 (as Fenagh/Gortlettteragh)
  - B: 1998, 1999, 2000
  - C: 2008, 2011
- Leitrim Minor Football League: (2)
  - Div 1: 1964
  - Div 3: 2012
- Leitrim Under-21 Football Championship: (2)
  - A: 1981, 2014
