= Cloone GAA =

Gaelic Athletic Association club in County Leitrim, Ireland

Cloone
- Cluain
- Founded: 1906
- County: Leitrim
- Colours: Blue and Gold
- Coordinates: 53°56′8.6″N 7°47′11.3″W

Playing kits
Standard colours

Senior Club Championships
	All Ireland	Connacht champions	Leitrim champions
Football:	-	-	11
Ladies' football:	–	–	3

Cloone GAA is a Gaelic Athletic Association (GAA) club in Cloone, County Leitrim, Ireland. It fields Gaelic football teams in competitions organised by Leitrim GAA.

Cloone GAA was founded in 1906. The club amalgamated with Corduff around 1925/26 and with Riverstown around 1931/32. The club won the Leitrim Senior Football Championship eleven times between 1911 and 1980.

As of 2020, Cloone were competing in the Leitrim Junior A Football Championship.

== Honours ==
Competition	Quantity	Years
Leitrim Senior Football Championship	11	1911, 1934, 1937, 1942, 1944, 1946, 1947, 1948, 1950, 1951, 1980
Leitrim Intermediate Football Championship	2	1972, 2009
Leitrim Junior Football Championship	3	1962, 1969, 1990
Leitrim Minor Football Championship	3	1944, 1962, 1963
Leitrim Ladies' Senior Football Championship	3	1992, 2002, 2010
