= Annaduff GAA =

Leitrim-based Gaelic games club

Annaduff
- Eanach Dubh
- Founded: 1899
- County: Leitrim
- Colours: Maroon and gold
- Grounds: Stanley Cox Memorial Park, Annaduff
- Coordinates: 53.8942°N 7.9513°W

Playing kits
Standard colours

Senior Club Championships
	All Ireland	Connacht champions	Leitrim champions
Football:	-	-	2
Ladies' football:	–	–	3

Annaduff GAA (Irish: Eanach Dubh) is a Gaelic Athletic Association (GAA) club based in County Leitrim, Ireland. The club fields Gaelic football teams and competes in competitions organised by Leitrim GAA, including the Leitrim Senior Football Championship.

== History ==
Gaelic football in the Annaduff parish dates back to 1899, when teams such as Annaduff Parnellites and Drumsna Connaught Rangers competed in early local competitions.

The modern club was reformed in 1938, winning the Leitrim Junior Championship that year and again in 1941. After a period of inactivity, Annaduff was re-established in 1958. In 1983, the club opened its own grounds, the Stanley Cox Memorial Park, named in honour of Stanley Cox a figure in securing the land.

The early 2000s marked a successful era: Annaduff won the Leitrim Intermediate Championship and League in 2001, followed by their first Senior Football Championship since 1928 in 2004, defeating Gortletteragh in the final. Victory in the final, which ended 0-7 to 0-5 in Páirc Seán Mac Diarmada, secured the club's first senior championship title since 1928. Annaduff also won the Senior League, Junior A Championship and Division 4 League that year.

In 2017, after 16 seasons at senior level, the club was relegated to the Intermediate ranks. Annaduff returned to senior status in 2024, having won the 2023 Intermediate Championship against Melvin Gaels.

In 2026, Annaduff defeated St. Patricks Dromahair by 3-11 to 1-9 in the Leitrim Intermediate Football Championship to win their third Intermediate Football Championship and gain promotion to the Leitrim Senior Football Championship for the 2027 season.

== Honours ==
=== Men's Gaelic football ===
- Leitrim Senior Football Championship (2): 1928, 2004
- Leitrim Intermediate Football Championship (3): 2001, 2023, 2026
- Leitrim Junior A Football Championship (9): 1926, 1938, 1941, 1964, 1972, 1983, 1986, 2004, 2007

=== Ladies' Gaelic football ===
- Leitrim Ladies Senior Football Championship (3): 1991, 1995, 1996
- Leitrim Ladies Junior Football Championship (5): 2003, 2012, 2018, 2023, 2025
- Leitrim Ladies Senior Shield (2): 1995, 2000
