= Drumkeerin GAA =

Leitrim-based Gaelic games club

- CLG Droim Caorthainn
- Founded: 1933
- County: Leitrim
- Nickname: The Brown Cows
- Colours: Maroon & White
- Grounds: Páirc Naomh Bríd

Playing kits
Standard colours

Drumkeerin GAA Club (Irish: CLG Droim Caorthainn) is a Gaelic football club in Drumkeeran, north County Leitrim, Ireland. It takes part in competitions organized by the Leitrim County Board. The club was formed in 1933. The club's colours are maroon and white.

The club is based in the village of Drumkeeran and draws its members predominantly from the parish of Inishmagrath (and also some players from neighbouring areas, including Killargue, Killavoggy and Arigna).

== Achievements ==
- Leitrim Junior Football Championship: 3
  - 1964, 1975, 1985
- Leitrim Minor Football Championship (B Championship): 3
  - 1993, 1994, 2009
