= Leitrim Ladies' Senior Football Championship =

Annual ladies' gaelic football competition in Ireland

Leitrim Senior Ladies' Football Championship
- Irish: Craobh Peile na mBan Sinsear Liatroma
- Code: Ladies' Gaelic Football
- Founded: 1979
- Region: Leitrim (GAA)
- Title holders: Glencar–Manorhamilton (6th title)
- Most titles: Aughawillan (19 titles)
- Official website: leitrimlgfa.ie

The Leitrim Ladies' Senior Football Championship is the senior Ladies' Gaelic Football competition featuring clubs affiliated to the Leitrim GAA.

Aughawillan are the competitions most successful club, having won 19 titles.

Glencar–Manorhamilton are the reigning champions, having defeated St Joseph's in the 2025 final.

== Roll of honour ==
#	Club	Titles	Years won
1	Aughawillan	19	1979, 1984, 1988, 1989, 1990, 1994, 1997, 1998, 1999, 2000, 2001, 2003, 2004, 2005, 2006, 2007, 2008, 2009, 2013
2	Glencar–Manorhamilton	6	2020, 2021, 2022, 2023, 2024, 2025
2	Fenagh	6	1982, 1983, 1985, 1986, 1987, 1993
4	St Joseph's	4	2012, 2017, 2018, 2019
5	Cloone	3	1992, 2002, 2010
5	Annaduff	3	1991, 1995, 1996
7	Kiltubrid	2	2015, 2016
7	Dromahair	2	2011, 2014
7	Glenfarne	2	1981, 1988

== Finals listed by year ==
Year	Winner	Score	Runners up	Score
2025	Glencar/Manorhamilton	3-13	St Joseph's	1-12
2024	Glencar/Manorhamilton	1-7	St Joseph's	1-6
2023	Glencar/Manorhamilton	2-8	St Joseph's	3-4
2022	Glencar/Manorhamilton	5-6	Ballinamore	2-10
2021	Glencar/Manorhamilton	2-8	St Joseph's	1-6
2020	Glencar/Manorhamilton	5-19	Ballinamore	1-9
2019	St Joseph's	1-11	Glencar/Manorhamilton	0-11
2018	St Joseph's	3-9	Glencar/Manorhamilton	2-5
2017	St Joseph's	0-11 (Replay)	Dromahair	0-9
2016	Kiltubrid	2-12	St Joseph's	1-10
2015	Kiltubrid	1-8	Aughawillan	0-9
2014	Dromahair	4-6	St Joseph's	2-9
2013	Aughawillan	2-4 (Replay)	St Joseph's	1-6 (Replay
2012	St Joseph's	1-8	Mohill	1-4
2011	Dromahair	2-10	St Joseph's	1-11
2010	Cloone	3-6	St Joseph's	1-9
2009	Aughawillan	1-11	Cloone	0-8
2008	Aughawillan	0-12	Cloone	2-2
2007	Aughawillan	0-12	Cloone	2-2
2006	Aughawillan	2-9	Cloone	1-7
2005	Aughawillan	3-11	Mohill	2-8
2004	Aughawillan	2-14	Mohill	2-1
2003	Aughawillan	1-10	Cloone	2-4
2002	Cloone	1-13	Mohill	1-7
2001	Aughawillan	3-12	Kiltubrid	0-5
2000	Aughawillan	0-12	Cloone	0-4
1999	Aughawillan	2-16	Cloone	1-3
1998	Aughawillan	2-15	Kiltubrid	2-8
1997	Aughawillan	2-8 (Replay); 1-7	Kiltubrid	0-4 (Replay); 1-7
1996	Annaduff	4-13	Cloone	1-8
1995	Annaduff		Aughawillan	
1994	Aughawillan	3-4	Fenagh	1-3
1993	Fenagh	4-9	Aughawillan	1-9
1992	Cloone	3-8	Annaduff	2-2
1991	Annaduff	4-8	Fenagh	2-11
1990	Aughawillan	2-7	Fenagh	1-3
1989	Aughawillan	2-7	Annaduff	1-3
1988	Aughawillan			
1987	Fenagh		Glenfarne	
1986	Fenagh		Cloone	
1985	Fenagh		Glenfarne	
1984	Aughawillan			
1983	Fenagh	4-3	Aughawillan	0-2
1982	Fenagh	1-2	Aughawillan	0-2
1981	Glenfarne	2-6	Fenagh	0-0
1980	Glenfarne		St Mary's	
1979	Aughawillan		Aughnasheelin	
