= Seamus Quinn =

Irish Gaelic footballer

Personal information
- Born: County Leitrim, Ireland

Sport
- Sport: Gaelic football
- Position: Full Back
Club
- Years: Club
- ? - ?: Gortletteragh
Inter-county
Years	County	Apps (scores)
1993–2004	Leitrim	15 (2-05)
Inter-county titles
- Connacht titles: 1
- All Stars: 1

Seamus Quinn is a former Gaelic footballer from Gortletteragh, County Leitrim. Along with Mickey Quinn he is Leitrim's only All Star winner. Quinn won an All Star at full-back in 1994. This was in Leitrim's Connacht Senior Football Championship winning season; Quinn would go on to become the last remaining member of that team following the departure of Fergal Reynolds.

In 2000, Brian McEniff selected him to represent Ireland against Australia, becoming the first Leitrim player to receive international recognition.

After retirement from playing he managed the county's junior team to a Connacht Junior Football Championship title in 2017.

== Honours ==
- 1 Connacht Senior Football Championship (1994)
- 1 All Star Award (1994)
- 1 International Rules Series (2000)
