= Annaduff, County Leitrim =

Civil parish in County Leitrim, Ireland

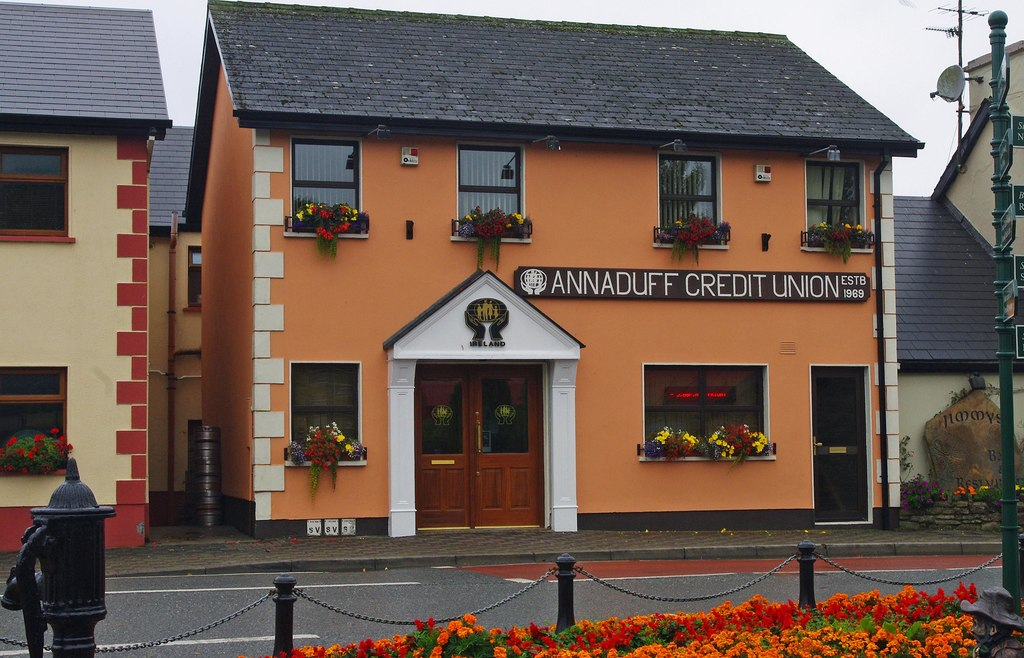
Annaduff Credit Union, Drumod, County Leitrim

Annaduff (Irish: Eanach Duibh, meaning 'marsh of Dubh') is a civil parish in the baronies of Mohill and Leitrim in County Leitrim, Ireland. Annaduff civil parish contains a townland of the same name, and overlaps with the electoral division of Annaduff. The civil parish, which is approximately 44.6 km^{2} (17.2 sq mi) in area, contains the villages of Drumod, Drumsna and Aghamore.

Annaduff civil parish was historically coterminous with the Church of Ireland parish of the same name and the equivalent Catholic parish. The Church of Ireland (Anglican) parish church, Saint Anne's Church in Annaduff townland, was built in 1815. It is within the Diocese of Ardagh. The Catholic parish church, St. Mary's Church of the Immaculate Conception in Aghamore townland, dates from the 1830s. It is in the Roman Catholic Diocese of Ardagh and Clonmacnoise. Annaduff National School, which is located alongside the Catholic church in Aghamore, had an enrollment of approximately 200 pupils as of 2024.

== Townlands ==
Annaduff civil parish contains approximately 60 townlands. These include its namesake townland (Annaduff, 272 acres), and larger townlands such as Annaduff Glebe (484 acres) and Derrycarne Demesne (438 acres). Lavagh (135 acres) and Dristernan (133 acres) are also townlands within Annaduff parish.

== Sports ==
The local Gaelic Athletic Association (GAA) club, Annaduff GAA, won the Leitrim Intermediate Football Championship in 2023 and 2026.
