= Leitrim Junior Football Championship =

Annual Gaelic football competition

- Irish: Craobh Soisir Liatroma
- Founded: 1917
- Title holders: Aughnasheelin (4th title)
- First winner: Shamrocks (Gorvagh/Cornagun)
- Most titles: Eslin (10 titles)
- Sponsors: Fresh Today

The Leitrim Junior A Football Championship is an annual football competition often for Leitrim GAA clubs and is the counties third tier of football championship. The 2026 Junior A Champions of Leitrim were Aughnasheelin

== Junior A Championship ==
=== Wins listed by club ===
| # | Club | Wins | Years won | Last final lost |
|---|---|---|---|---|
| 1 | Eslin | 10 | 1935, 1942, 1971, 1979, 1988, 1993, 1996, 2005, 2006, 2010. | 2024 |
| 2 | Annaduff | 9 | 1926, 1938, 1941, 1964, 1972, 1983, 1986, 2004, 2007 | 2006 |
| 3 | Glenfarne | 8 | 1934, 1936, 1937, 1940, 1947, 1959, 1991, 2018 | 2021 |
| 4 | Mohill | 7 | 1943, 1957, 1968, 1978, 2013, 2015, 2021 | 2011 |
| 5 | St Mary's, Kiltoghert | 6 | 1945, 1953, 1956, 2002, 2014, 2023 | 2022 |
| 5 | Aughavas | 6 | 1930, 1984, 2009, 2016, 2020, 2025 | —N/a |
| 8 | Bornacoola | 5 | 1932, 1950, 1952, 2003, 2024. | |
| 8 | Allen Gaels | 5 | 1963 (as Drumshanbo St Francis), 1987, 1994, 2008 | 2000 |
| 8 | Glencar–Manorhamilton | 5 | 1958, 1970, 1982, 1999, 2019 | 2018 |
| 1 | Aughnasheelin | 4 | 1948, 1954, 1965, 2026 | 1961 |
| 10 | Drumeela | 3 | 1928, 1944, 1949 | —N/a |
| 10 | Cloone | 3 | 1962, 1969, 1990 | 2020 |
| 10 | Drumkeerin | 3 | 1966, 1975, 1985 | 1981 |
| 10 | Dromahair | 3 | 1976, 1998, 2001 | 1992 |
| 10 | Kiltubrid | 3 | 1981, 1989, 1995 | 2026 |
| 16 | Drumreilly | 2 | 1946, 1977 | 2025 |
| 16 | Melvin Gaels | 2 | 1955, 2011 | 1979 |
| 16 | Aughawillan | 2 | 1960, 1974 | 1973 |
| 16 | Fenagh | 2 | 1967, 1973 | 1971 |
| 16 | Ballinamore Seán O'Heslin's | 2 | 1997, 2017 | 2016 |
| 21 | Shamrocks | 1 | 1917 | —N/a |
| 21 | Aughashlane | 1 | 1919 | —N/a |
| 21 | Tully | 1 | 1931 | —N/a |
| 21 | Blacklion | 1 | 1951 | 1938 |
| 21 | Dowra | 1 | 1962 | 1928 |
| 21 | Carrigallen | 1 | 1980 | 2007 |
| 21 | Ballinaglera | 1 | 1992 | —N/a |
| 21 | Gortletteragh | 1 | 2000 | 2012 |
| 21 | Leitrim Gaels | 1 | 2012 | 2010 |
