= Mohill GAA =

Leitrim-based Gaelic games club

- Maothail CLG
- Founded: 1889
- County: Leitrim
- Colours: Green and white
- Grounds: Philly McGuinness Memorial Park
- Coordinates: 53°55′07″N 7°51′49″W

Playing kits
Standard colours

Senior Club Championships
	All Ireland	Connacht champions	Leitrim champions
Football:	-	-	10

Mohill GAA is a Gaelic Athletic Association gaelic football club in Mohill, County Leitrim, Ireland.

The parish of Mohill currently has two GAA Football Clubs, Mohill who play in Division 1 and the Senior Championship and Eslin who play in Division 3 and the Intermediate Championship. The Mohill Club also fields teams in Reserve Divisions 1 and 2 and Junior A Championship and Division 4 and Junior B Championship. Both Clubs have won Senior Titles in the past and in fact Mohill Faugh-an-Bealaghs won the first Leitrim Senior Championship in 1890, defeating Ballinamore in the final. Eslin won their first title the following year by defeating Mohill in the final. They won the last of their three Titles in 1917 but have won several Junior Championships in the meantime. Mohill won their most recent Senior titles in 2006, 2015, 2017, 2020, 2023, and 2024.

== History ==
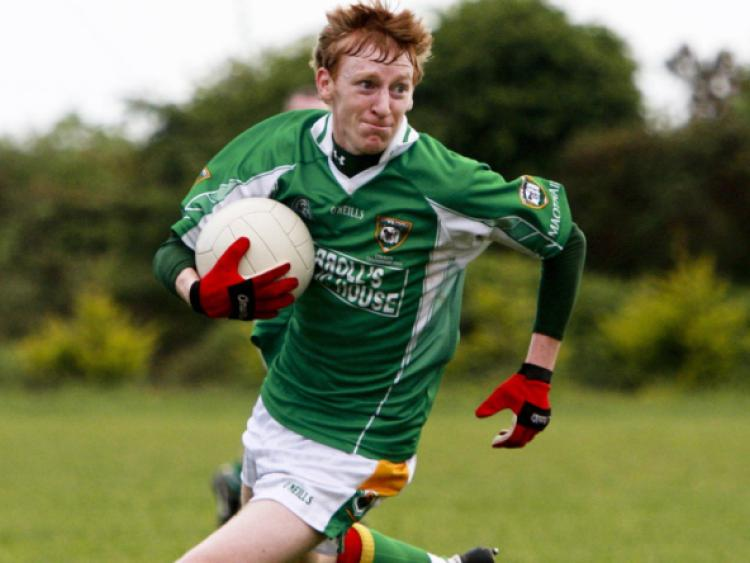
Philip McGuinness (1984–2010) in Mohill strip; he died after an accident while playing for Mohill, and their grounds are named for him.

=== Senior ===
Mohill have won the Senior Championship nine times, in 1890, 1914, 1929, 1971, 2006, 2015, 2017, 2020 and 2023. 2006 was their first Senior title in 35 years and was also their first time to contest a final since 1974. In October 2006, they completed a five-point comeback with six minutes remaining to win by a point. In December 2006, they won the Division 1 League for the first time in the club's history, defeating Aughawillan in Ballinamore. Both Mohill and Aughawillan had contested the Division 2 League Final of 2005.

They reached the Senior Championship Semi-final in 2010, narrowly losing to Glencar–Manorhamilton and in 2013 lost the final to St Marys/Kiltoghert. they contested four league finals in a row from 2013 to 2016, winning their first since 2006 in 2015 beating Glencar/Manor with an injury time point from Ronan Kennedy.

The championship final of 2015 was their third appearance in a final in 10 years. Glencar–Manorhamilton were back in their first final in three years. On 27 September 2015, the showpiece of Leitrim football ended all square in Pairc Sean MacDiarmada as they relinquished a four-point lead in the last five minutes. Leading 0–12 to 1–5, Glencar/Manor scored four points on the trot to rescue the game with an injury time free forcing a replay with the full-time score at 0–12 to 1–9.

During the replay, the score stood at 0–6 to 0–4 and with one last throw of the dice, Ronan Gallagher let the ball into the square only to land in the possession of North Leitrim. But a fumble on the way out of the defence seen the ball scooped up by Alan McLoughlin who had a hit and hope shot from the edge of the D land in the hands of Ronan Kennedy, who side-stepped Pat Gilmartin, took a hop, and calmly placed the ball to the Glencar/Manor net. As soon as the ball hit the net, referee Ray McBrien blew the full-time whistle amidst celebrations from the Mohill players, managers and supporters.

In December 2016, they retained the Senior League for the first time ever beating Aughawillan after extra-time.

=== Junior titles ===
In 1978, their first team won the Junior A League and Championship only seven years after claiming the Senior Championship. Their second and third teams have also had success winning the Junior B Championship in 1997 and the Junior C Championship in 2003. In recent years, their second team were not promoted to Division 2 and Intermediate Championship before 2013 after losing the Junior A Championship in 2011 and finishing just outside the top two in Division 3 on numerous occasions.

In 2013, they contested their first Senior championship final since 2006 but lost to St Marys Kiltoghert 2–14 to 2–8. A week later they contested the Junior A Championship final for the second time in three years. They defeated St Marys on a scoreline of 2–12 to 1–8 winning their first Junior A Championship in 35 years. This win brought to a conclusion a week in which they won the Junior A and Minor A Championship and lost the Senior Championship final.

In 2015, they topped off the most successful year in the club's history by being promoted to Division 2 and the Intermediate Championship winning the Junior League and Championship, the first Junior double in the county since 1995 and their first since 1978.

=== St Manchans – U20 & Minor titles ===
Mohill and Eslin amalgamate for Minor and U20 under the name St Manchans, named after the patron saint of the parish. St Manchans first amalgamated in 1975 and first tasted success in 1976, winning the Minor League. Manchans went on to win the Minor Championship in 1983 and 1986 before the amalgamation resolved until 2008 when it was revived once again.

Since 2008, St Manchans have contested eight Minor league finals in 2008, 2010, 2011, 2012, 2013, 2014, 2015 and 2016 winning six in a row since 2011. They have also contested five Minor championship finals in a row from 2012 to 2016, winning in 2013 versus Sean O'Heslins and in 2015 after a replay against Fenagh/Gortletteragh. St Manchans U21s also won the championship in 2016, 2017 and 2010 and contesting finals in 2012, 2013 and 2014, but losing all three. Mohill and Gortletteragh have also amalgamated in the past to form Lough Rynn Gaels. In the late 1970s, they won the U21 Championship in 1977 and 1978 and the Minor Championship in 1979.

On three occasions, Mohill have won four-in-a-row Minor Leagues in 1983, 1984, 1985 and 1986 and in 1996, 1997, 1998 and 1999 and again in 2011, 2012, 2013 and 2014. They finally made the breakthrough in 2015 by achieving five in a row, then six in a row in 2016. Many of the players who won four Minor Leagues in the 1980s also were victorious at U16 level, winning four-in-a-row Championships in 1981, 1982, 1983 and 1984. Also the same in the 1990s as they won three-in-a-row U16 Leagues in 1995, 1996 and 1997 and again in the 2000s when they won three U16 Championships in a row in 2011, 2012 and 2013.

Since 2000, Mohill have won several underage league and championship competitions, including three Minor A Championships in a row in 2003, 2004 and 2005. They also won the league in 2003 and 2004.

Mohill GAA Club released a history book in December 2016 called 'Fág A Bealach – Clear the Way 1889–2015'. Mohill GAA Club was 130 years old in 2019.

== Notable players ==
- Keith Beirne

== Honours ==
Competition	Quantity	Years
Leitrim Senior Football Championship	10	1890, 1914, 1929, 1971, 2006, 2015,2017, 2020, 2023, 2024
Leitrim Senior Football League	7	2006, 2015, 2016, 2017, 2019, 2021, 2022
Leitrim Intermediate Football Championship	2	1928, 1999
Leitrim Division 2 Football League	4	1979, 1996, 1998, 2005
Leitrim Junior Football Championship	7	1943, 1957, 1968, 1978, 2013, 2015, 2021
Leitrim Junior Football League	4	1957, 1978, 2015, 2017
Junior B Football Championship	4	1997, 2017, 2020, 2024
Division 4 Football League	1	1997
Division 4B Football League	5	1979, 1982, 1983, 1985, 1986
Junior C Football Championship	1	2003
Division 5 Football League	1	2014
Under 21 Football Championship	8	1977**, 1978**, 1985, 1986, 2000, 2010*, 2016*, 2017*
Under 20 B Football Championship	1	2023
Leitrim Minor Football Championship	12	1954, 1956, 1970, 1979**, 1983*, 1986*, 1997, 2003, 2004, 2005, 2013*, 2015*
Minor Football League	19	1956, 1972, 1976*, 1983, 1984, 1985, 1986, 1996, 1997, 1998, 1999, 2003, 2004, 2011*, 2012*, 2013*, 2014*, 2015*, 2016*

- * Won as St Manchans (Mohill/Eslin)
- ** Won as Lough Rynn Gaels (Mohill/Gortletteragh)
