= Melvin Gaels GFC =

Leitrim-based Gaelic games club

- Gaeil na Meilge
- Founded: 1954
- County: Leitrim
- Colours: Blue and White
- Grounds: Melvin Park, Kinlough
- Coordinates: 54°26′40.23″N 8°17′15.85″W

Playing kits
Standard colours

Senior Club Championships
	All Ireland	Connacht champions	Leitrim champions
Football:	0	0	7

Melvin Gaels GFC is a Gaelic Athletic Association gaelic football club in Kinlough, County Leitrim, Ireland.

The club was formed on 19 November 1954. Situated in North Leitrim it is bordered by three Counties: Donegal, Fermanagh and Sligo. The club is named after Lough Melvin, a fresh-water lake.

The club is based in the village of Kinlough and draws its members from the parish of Kinlough/Glenade and part of the parish of Ballaghmeehan. Contained within the four areas are Tullaghan, Askill, Rossinver, Glenaniff and Ballintrillick. Although Ballintrillick is in County Sligo, it is half the parish of Glenade and over the years it has provided many members for Melvin Gaels.

There are four adult Melvin Gaels teams. The senior team last won a Leitrim Senior Football Championship in 2012 and has won the senior title a total of seven times. A reserve team was established in the mid-1990s and has won the Junior League three times (1999, 2003, 2011) and three Championships (2004, 2011, 2021). A third team was also established in 2022 on the back of the successful reserve team, and went on to claim the Leitrim Junior C Championship in that same year. The club now also fields an adult ladies team which entered the Leitrim LGFA Junior league and Championship for the first time in 2024.

The club colours are blue and white on the request of the late Rev. J. Dolan P.P one of the founding members of the club and native of County Cavan.

The 1962 Leitrim Senior Football Championship had been declared null and void, but in March 2009 Melvin Gaels were declared as champions, ending the longest-running dispute the GAA had ever had.

== Players ==
- Emlyn Mulligan

== Honours ==
Competition	Quantity	Years
Leitrim Senior Football Championship	7	1959, 1960, 1961, 1962, 1965, 1998, 2012
Leitrim Intermediate Football Championship	5	1971, 1992, 2011, 2015, 2024
Leitrim Junior Football Championship	2	1955, 2011
Leitrim Junior B Football Championship	2	2004, 2021
Leitrim Junior C Football Championship	1	2022
North Leitrim Football Championship	2	1955, 1960
Leitrim Under 21 A Football Championship	2	2009, 2018
Leitrim Under 21 B Football Championship	3	2003, 2004, 2005
Leitrim Minor Football Championship	2	2005, 2016
Leitrim Senior Football League Div 1	7	1958, 1959, 1961, 1962, 1965, 1966, 2008
Leitrim Senior Football Shield	1	2007
Leitrim Senior Football League Div 2	1	1992
Leitrim Junior Football League	5	1979, 1988, 1999, 2003, 2011 (Div 4)
North Leitrim Football League (Lundon Cup)	1	1936
Leitrim Minor Football League (Rural)	2	1990, 1991
