= Leitrim Intermediate Football Championship =

Annual Gaelic football competition

- Current season or competition: 2026
- Irish: Craobh Idirmheanach Liatroma
- Founded: 1928
- Trophy: Frank Reynolds Memorial Cup
- No. of teams: 8
- Title holders: Annaduff (3rd title)
- Most titles: Melvin Gaels (5 titles)
- Sponsors: Smith Monumentals

The Leitrim Intermediate Football Championship is an annual football competition contested by mid-tier Leitrim GAA clubs. The Leitrim County Board of the Gaelic Athletic Association has organised it since 1928.

Annaduff are the title holders. Annaduff Defeated St. Patricks Dromahair 3-11 to 1-09 to win the 2026 Leitrim Intermediate Football Championship.

== Qualification for subsequent competitions ==
The Leitrim IFC winner qualifies for the Connacht Intermediate Club Football Championship and in the event the Leitrim IFC winner winning this competition, they would qualify for the All-Ireland Intermediate Club Football Championship semi-final stage.

== Wins listed by club ==
#	Club	Wins	Years won	Last final lost
1	Melvin Gaels	5	1971, 1992, 2011, 2015, 2024	2023
2	St Mary's, Kiltoghert	4	1995, 1997, 2000, 2004	1994
3	Aughavas	3	1990, 1993, 1994	2007
3	Annaduff	3	2001, 2023, 2026	—N/a
3	Gortletteragh	3	2003, 2012, 2020	2011
3	Glencar–Manorhamilton	3	1971, 2005, 2013	2003
3	Aughnasheelin	3	2008, 2017, 2022	1990
7	Mohill	2	1928, 1999	—N/a
7	Carrigallen	2	1991, 2006	—N/a
7	Drumreilly	2	1998, 2007	2006
7	Cloone	2	1972, 2009	1974
7	Dromahair	2	2014, 2021	2025
7	Fenagh	2	1974, 2018	—N/a
13	Allen Gaels	1	1989, 2025	2024
13	Ballinaglera	1	1996	1989
13	Kiltubrid	1	2002	1998
13	Ballinamore Seán O'Heslin's	1	2016	2015
13	Aughawillan	1	2010	2009
13	Leitrim Gaels	1	2019	—N/a
