= Leitrim Senior Football Championship =

- Current season or competition: 2026 Leitrim Senior Football Championship
- Irish: Craobh Peile Sinsear Chontae Liatroma
- No. of teams: 8
- Title holders: Ballinamore Sean O'Heslins (22nd title)
- Most titles: Ballinamore Seán O'Heslin's (22 titles)
- Sponsors: Connacht Gold

The Leitrim Senior Football Championship is an annual football competition contested by top-tier Leitrim GAA clubs. The Leitrim County Board of the Gaelic Athletic Association has organised it since 1890.

Ballinamore Sean O'Heslins are the current champions defeating Fenagh in the 2026 Leitrim Senior Football Championship Final.

Aughawillan Were Relegated. Annaduff Were Promoted from the Leitrim Intermediate Football Championship and will compete In the 2027 Leitrim Senior Football Championship

== History ==
The 1962 championship had been declared null and void, but in March 2009 Melvin Gaels were declared as champions, ending the longest-running dispute the GAA had ever had.

The final play of the 1994 Leitrim Senior Football Championship between Allen Gaels and Aughawillan proved contentious as Martin McGowan of Allen Gaels, who was playing with a dislocated spine, stood to take a free. Aughawillan's full-back, Martin Flanagan, took up a position behind his goalkeeper, Martin Prior. McGowan struck the ball and expressed certainty that it was two yards over the bar. However, Aughawillan's Flanagan gave Prior "a bit of a hoosh" and Prior, with his shoulders close to level with the crossbar, caught the ball. Referee Enda Stenson did not penalise the move and then blew the final whistle. Thus Allen Gaels were denied a replay and Aughawillan secured a third consecutive championship title.

== Teams ==
=== 2027 teams ===
8 teams contest the 2027 Leitrim Senior Football Championship:

Club	Location	Colours	Position in 2026	In championship since	Championship titles	Last championship title
Annaduff	Annaduff	Maroon and Gold	Intermediate Champions 2026	2027	2	2004
Ballinamore Seán O'Heslin's	Ballinamore	Gold and green	Winners	2017	22	2026
Fenagh	Fenagh	Red and Black	Runners-Up	2018	5	1932
Glencar–Manorhamilton	Manorhamilton	Saffron and blue	Group stage	?	7	2019
Leitrim Gaels	Leitrim Village	Purple and Green	Semi-Finalists	2020	1	2025
Mohill	Mohill	Green and white	Semi-Finalists	2000	10	2024
St Mary's	Kiltoghert	Blue and white	Quarter-Finalists	2002	6	2022
Allen Gaels	Drumshanbo	Sky Blue and white	Quarter-Finalists	2026	5	2002

== Honours ==
The trophy presented to the winners is the Fenagh Perpetual Cup. Presented to the county board by Fenagh man Dick Ellis. The winning club qualifies to represent their county in the Connacht Senior Club Football Championship. The winners can, in turn, go on to play in the All-Ireland Senior Club Football Championship.

== List of finals ==
=== Legend ===
- (r) = replay
- Gold – Connacht senior club champions
- Silver – Connacht senior club runners-up

=== List of Leitrim SFC finals ===
Year	Winners		Runners-up	
Year	Club	Score	Club	Score
1890	Mohill	2-02	Ballinamore Seán O'Heslin's	0-01
1891	Eslin	1-04	Mohill	0-02
1892–1903	No competition			
1904	Bornacoola	0-04	Mohill	0-02
1905	Gortletteragh	0-02 (awarded title)	Bornacoola	0-04
1906	Fenagh (awarded title)		Gorvagh	
1907–1909	No competition			
1910	Fenagh		Mohill	
1911	Cloone		Ballinamore Seán O'Heslin's	
1912	Fenagh	1-01	Mohill	0-01
1913	Ballinamore Seán O'Heslin's	2-03	Mohill	1-00
1914	Mohill			
1915	Aughavas	1-02	Mohill	0-02
1916	Eslin		Fenagh	
1917	Eslin (awarded title)			
1918	Aughnasheelin		Cloone	
1919	Fenagh	1-02	Aughavas	0-01
1920–1921	No competition			
1922	Ballinamore Seán O'Heslin's	4-01	Mohill	2-02
1923	Kiltyhugh	3-02	Ballinamore Seán O'Heslin's	2-03
1924	Gorvagh	3-02	Fenagh	2-02
1925	Gorvagh	1-05	Fenagh	0-05
1926	Gorvagh	2-01	Fenagh	0-03
1927	Gorvagh	1-03	Annaduff	0-03
1928	Annaduff	2-01	Gorvagh	2-00
1929	Mohill	0-06	Fenagh	0-03
1930	Ballinamore Seán O'Heslin's		Mohill	
1931	Drumreilly	1-05	Fenagh	1-01
1932	Fenagh	(awarded title)	Drumreilly	
1933	Ballinamore Seán O'Heslin's	0-06, by 1 pt. (r)	Aughnasheelin	0-06, - --
1934	Cloone	1-01	Ballinamore Seán O'Heslin's	0-01
1935	Ballinamore Seán O'Heslin's	1-05	Kiltubrid	0-05
1936	Ballinamore Seán O'Heslin's	1-06	Tully	1-05
1937	Cloone	3-07	Tully	2-02
1938	Bornacoola	(by 1 pt.)	Tully	
1939	Ballinamore Seán O'Heslin's	(awarded title)	Tully	
1940	Aughavas	1-04, 3-04 (r)	Bornacoola	1-03, 1-03 (r)
1941	Carrigallen		Mohill	
1942	Cloone	1-08	Carrigallen	1-03
1943	Bornacoola	3-09	Fenagh	1-04
1944	Cloone	1-05	Tully	0-04
1945	Tully		Cloone	
1946	Cloone	4-04	Aughawillan	0-03
1947	Cloone	2-02	Aughawillan	1-01
1948	Cloone	2-05	Aughavas	0-04
1949	Aughavas	4-07 (r)	St Mary's, Kiltoghert	0-01 (r)
1950	Cloone	1-09	Ballinamore Seán O'Heslin's	0-05
1951	Cloone	1-08	Carrigallen Harps	1-03
1952	Aughavas	1-08	Fenagh	0-01
1953	Bornacoola	1-04	Aughavas	1-03
1954	Aughavas	0-06	Sean Treacy's	0-04
1955	Aughavas	(awarded title)	Bornacoola	
1956	Ballinamore Seán O'Heslin's	3-09 (r)	Melvin Gaels	1-04 (r)
1957	Bornacoola	3-07	Melvin Gaels	0-05
1958	St Mary's, Kiltoghert	0-08	Ballinamore Seán O'Heslin's	1-03
1959	Melvin Gaels	1-06	Ballinamore Seán O'Heslin's	0-00
1960	Melvin Gaels	1-05 (r)	St Mary's, Kiltoghert	0-07 (r)
1961	Melvin Gaels	1-06	St Mary's, Kiltoghert	0-05
1962†	Melvin Gaels†		Aughavas	
1963	Aughavas	1-07	St Mary's, Kiltoghert	0-06
1964	Ballinamore Seán O'Heslin's	0-05	Melvin Gaels	0-04
1965	Melvin Gaels	0-12	Gortletteragh	0-01
1966	Aughavas	1-14	Annaduff	1-06
1967	Ballinamore Seán O'Heslin's	1-04	Melvin Gaels	0-03
1968	Ballinamore Seán O'Heslin's	2-06	Melvin Gaels	1-04
1969	Ballinamore Seán O'Heslin's	1-11	Aughavas	2-05
1970	Gortletteragh	1-11	Aughavas	1-07
1971	Mohill	0-06	Ballinamore Seán O'Heslin's	0-04
1972	Ballinamore Seán O'Heslin's	1-12	Mohill	1-07
1973	Ballinamore Seán O'Heslin's	2-05	Allen Gaels	1-07
1974	Sheemore Gaels	1-10	Mohill	0-08
1975	Ballinamore Seán O'Heslin's	0-11	St Mary's, Kiltoghert	1-06
1976	Aughawillan	1-11	Glencar–Manorhamilton	1-07
1977	Glencar–Manorhamilton	1-12	St Mary's, Kiltoghert	2-06
1978	Aughawillan	2-05	Gortletteragh	1-07
1979	Ballinamore Seán O'Heslin's	0-07	Gortletteragh	0-06
1980	Cloone	2-09	Gortletteragh	0-09
1981	Gortletteragh	0-10	Fenagh	1-04
1982	Ballinamore Seán O'Heslin's	2-03	Gortletteragh	0-07
1983	Aughawillan	0-07	St Mary's, Kiltoghert	0-05
1984	Aughawillan	0-10	Ballinamore Seán O'Heslin's	0-06
1985	Gortletteragh	0-06, 1-13 (r)	Ballinamore Seán O'Heslin's	0-06, 0-04 (r)
1986	Ballinamore Seán O'Heslin's	0-09	Aughawillan	1-05
1987	Gortletteragh	1-08	Aughawillan	1-05
1988	Ballinamore Seán O'Heslin's	1-07	Aughawillan	0-08
1989	Aughawillan	2-07	Ballinamore Seán O'Heslin's	0-06
1990	Ballinamore Seán O'Heslin's	4-07	Aughawillan	3-06
1991	Allen Gaels	0-14	Ballinamore Seán O'Heslin's	2-06
1992	Aughawillan	0-10	Carrigallen	1-06
1993	Aughawillan	1-08, 0-12 (r)	St Mary's, Kiltoghert	0-11, 0-06 (r)
1994	Aughawillan	1-08	Allen Gaels	0-10
1995	St Mary's, Kiltoghert	0-08	Fenagh	0-06
1996	Allen Gaels	1-07, 2-11 (r)	St Mary's, Kiltoghert	1-07, 0-15 (r)
1997	Allen Gaels	2-14	Aughavas	1-11
1998	Melvin Gaels	2-07	Ballinamore Seán O'Heslin's	2-05
1999	Glencar–Manorhamilton	1-08	Fenagh	1-07
2000	Aughavas	0-10	Gortletteragh	0-03
2001	Allen Gaels	2-10	Aughavas	0-10
2002	Allen Gaels	0-11	Melvin Gaels	0-07
2003	St Mary's, Kiltoghert	0-10	Fenagh	0-08
2004	Annaduff	0-07	Gortletteragh	0-05
2005	Kiltubrid	4-11	Bornacoola	0-07
2006	Mohill	0-13	St Mary's, Kiltoghert	1-09
2007	St Mary's, Kiltoghert	0-11	Kiltubrid	2-03
2008	Glencar–Manorhamilton	2-09	Bornacoola	0-07
2009	Glencar–Manorhamilton	0-14	Carrigallen	2-07
2010	Glencar–Manorhamilton	0-07	St Mary's, Kiltoghert	0-05
2011	Glencar–Manorhamilton	0-10	St Mary's, Kiltoghert	0-06
2012	Melvin Gaels	2-07	Glencar–Manorhamilton	0-07
2013	St Mary's, Kiltoghert	2-14	Mohill	2-08
2014	Aughawillan	1-13	St Mary's, Kiltoghert	1-10
2015	Mohill	0-12, 1-04 (r)	Glencar–Manorhamilton	1-09, 0-06 (r)
2016	Aughawillan	1-10	Glencar–Manorhamilton	0-12
2017	Mohill	0-14	Glencar–Manorhamilton	0-11
2018	Aughawillan	0-14	Mohill	1-09
2019	Glencar–Manorhamilton	0-16	Ballinamore Seán O'Heslin's	0-15
2020	Mohill	0-14	St Mary's, Kiltoghert	0-09
2021	Ballinamore Seán O'Heslin's	1-16	Mohill	0-17
2022	St Mary's, Kiltoghert	0-11	Mohill	1-07
2023	Mohill	2-10	St Mary's, Kiltoghert	0-14
2024	Mohill	0-17 (4 pen) (r); 0-14	Ballinamore Seán O'Heslin's	1-14 (2 pen) (r); 1-11
2025	Leitrim Gaels	1-19	Ballinamore Seán O'Heslin's	0-14
2026	Ballinamore Sean O'Heslins	3-14 (r) 1-14	Fenagh	0-15 (r) 2-11

Notes

The name of the runner-up in some years is not given for a variety of reasons, such as the awarding of the championship to a team without a final being played, or the exact record of that year's championship being lost to history.

† The 1962 Championship had been declared null and void, but in March 2009 Melvin Gaels were declared as champions.

== Roll of honour ==
=== By club ===
#	Club	Titles	Runners-up	Championships won	Championships runners-up
1	Ballinamore Seán O'Heslin's	22	16	1913, 1922, 1930, 1933, 1935, 1936, 1939, 1956, 1964, 1967, 1968, 1969, 1972, 1973, 1975, 1979, 1982, 1986, 1988, 1990, 2021, 2026	1890, 1911, 1923, 1934, 1950, 1958, 1959, 1971, 1984, 1985, 1989, 1991, 1998, 2019, 2024, 2025
2	Aughawillan	12	6	1923*, 1976, 1978, 1983, 1984, 1989, 1992, 1993, 1994, 2014, 2016, 2018	1946, 1947, 1986, 1987, 1988, 1990
3	Cloone	11	2	1911, 1934, 1937, 1942, 1944, 1946, 1947, 1948, 1950, 1951, 1980	1918, 1945
4	Mohill	10	15	1890, 1914, 1929, 1971, 2006, 2015, 2017, 2020, 2023, 2024	1891, 1904, 1910, 1912, 1913, 1915, 1922, 1930, 1941, 1972, 1974, 2013, 2018, 2021, 2022
4	Aughavas	9	8	1915, 1940, 1949, 1952, 1954, 1955, 1963, 1966, 2000	1919, 1948, 1953, 1962, 1969, 1970, 1997, 2001
6	Melvin Gaels	7	6	1959, 1960, 1961, 1962, 1965, 1998, 2012	1956, 1957, 1964, 1967, 1968, 2002
6	Glencar–Manorhamilton	7	5	1977, 1999, 2008, 2009, 2010, 2011, 2019	1976, 2012, 2015, 2016, 2017
8	St Mary's, Kiltoghert	6	15	1958, 1995, 2003, 2007, 2013, 2022	1949, 1960, 1961, 1963, 1975, 1977, 1983, 1993, 1996, 2006, 2010, 2011, 2014, 2020, 2023
9	Fenagh	5	13	1906, 1910, 1912, 1919, 1932	1916, 1924, 1925, 1926, 1929, 1931, 1943, 1952, 1981, 1995, 1999, 2003, 2026
9	Gortletteragh	5	7	1905, 1970, 1981, 1985, 1987	1965, 1978, 1979, 1980, 1982, 2000, 2004
9	Bornacoola	5	5	1904, 1938, 1943, 1953, 1957	1905, 1940, 1955, 2005, 2008
9	Allen Gaels	5	2	1991, 1996, 1997, 2001, 2002	1973, 1994
13	Gorvagh	4	2	1924, 1925, 1926, 1927	1906, 1928
14	Eslin	3	0	1891, 1916, 1917	—
15	Annaduff	2	2	1928, 2004	1927, 1966
18	Tully	1	5	1945	1936, 1937, 1938, 1939, 1944
18	Carrigallen	1	3	1941	1942, 1992, 2009
18	Aughnasheelin	1	1	1918	1933
18	Drumreilly	1	1	1931	1932
18	Kiltubrid	1	2	2005	1935, 2007
18	Leitrim Gaels	1	0	2025	—
18	Sheemore Gaels	1	0	1974	—
22	Carrigallen Harps	0	1	—	1951
22	Sean Treacy’s	0	1	—	1954

=== Notes ===
- 1923: Won as Kiltyhugh

== See also ==
- Leitrim Senior Hurling Championship
- Leitrim Intermediate Football Championship
