= Páirc Seán Mac Diarmada =

GAA stadium in Carrick-on-Shannon, Ireland

- Interactive map of Páirc Seán Mac Diarmada
- Location: Carrick-on-Shannon, County Leitrim, N41 RY88, Ireland
- Coordinates: 53°56′53.01″N 8°4′30.53″W
- Owner: Leitrim GAA
- Capacity: 9,331 Capacity history: 17,000 (1964) 15,000 9,331 (2011–present)
- Field size: 142 x 87 m
- Public transit: Carrick-on-Shannon railway station

Construction
- Renovated: 2007

Páirc Seán Mac Diarmada (pronounced [ˌpˠaːɾʲc ˈʃaːn̪ˠ mˠək ˈdʲiəɾˠmˠəd̪ˠə]) is a GAA stadium in Carrick-on-Shannon, County Leitrim, Ireland. It is the home of Leitrim GAA's football and hurling teams. It was named for the Irish revolutionary Seán Mac Diarmada, one of the leaders of the 1916 Easter Rising. (As there was in the early 1960s some debate among Irish scholars as to whether the genitive case should be used in commemorative namings, the nominative form was used and has been retained, rather than what would now be generally regarded as the grammatically correct form, Páirc Sheáin Mhic Dhiarmada.)

The stadium, opened in 1964, had a capacity of 17,000, with 3,000 seats. Following a national review of health and safety at GAA stadiums, that was reduced in 2011 to 9,331.

In 2006–07, a major renovation created a 3,000-seat covered stand providing an unrestricted view of the football field. Within the structure there were three levels: Under the stand: ground level - 4 dressing rooms (with treatment room, 12 to 15 person shower area and toilet facilities); referees' room; kitchen & dining area; public toilet facilities (wheelchair accessible); first aid area; plant room. Under the seated area: Middle Tier: drugs testing area; large meeting room; press office; 3 x additional offices; display/museum room; kitchen. Upper stand: radio commentary area; press area; indoor camera area.

Costing approximately 3 million euro, the renovation was funded by grants, government funding, and a "Get on the Team" initiative, which raised funds from the local community. The stand naming rights were then sold, and it is now called Ardán Mhic Shamhráin (using the genitive form).

== See also ==
- List of Gaelic Athletic Association stadiums
- List of stadiums in Ireland by capacity
