= Ballinamore Seán O'Heslin's GAA =

Leitrim-based Gaelic games club

Ballinamore Seán O'Heslin's
- Cumann Sheáin Uí Eslin, Béal an Átha Móir
- Founded: 1889
- County: Leitrim
- Nickname: Ballinamore SOH; Pride of Ballinamore
- Colours: Gold and Green
- Grounds: Seán O'Heslin Memorial Park, Railway Road, Ballinamore
- Coordinates: 54.059690°N 7.793943°W

Playing kits
Standard colours

Senior Club Championships
	All Ireland	Connacht champions	Leitrim champions
Football:	-	-	21
Hurling:	-	-	3

Ballinamore Seán O'Heslin's Gaelic Athletic Association is a Gaelic football, hurling and ladies' Gaelic football club based in Ballinamore, County Leitrim, Ireland.

== History ==
The club was founded as Ballinamore in January 1889 in McGauran’s Railway Hotel. Unusually for a County Leitrim club, they have always fielded teams in both hurling and Gaelic football.

Local schoolteacher Seán O'Heslin was a driving force behind the club in its early years; he died in 1942; Sean O’Heslin Memorial Park opened in 1952 and the club was renamed Ballinamore Seán O'Heslin's in his honour in 1953.

The club won twenty Leitrim Senior Football Championships between 1913 and 1990, but have only won it once since then, in 2021. O'Heslin's also reached the final of the Connacht Senior Club Football Championship on four occasions — 1968, 1973, 1986 and 1990 — losing each time.

A ladies' Gaelic football team was founded in 2003. Camogie has been occasionally played, around 1917, revived in 1945–50 and again in the late 1990s; there is at present no camogie team.

== Honours ==
=== Gaelic football ===
- Leitrim Senior Football Championship (22): 1913, 1922, 1930, 1933, 1935, 1936, 1939, 1956, 1964, 1967, 1968, 1969, 1972, 1973, 1975, 1979, 1982, 1986, 1988, 1990, 2021, 2026
- Leitrim Senior Football League (12): 1967, 1968, 1970, 1971, 1972, 1977, 1978, 1979, 1980, 1982, 1988, 1989
- Leitrim Junior Football Championship (3): 1933, 1939, 1997
- Leitrim Under-21 Football Championship (7): 1972, 1979, 1987, 2005, 2006, 2008, 2009 (2005–09 as Oughteragh Gaels, a union with Aughnasheelin)
- Leitrim Minor Football Championship (24): 1929, 1935, 1946, 1947, 1949, 1952, 1958 1959, 1960, 1961, 1968, 1969, 1974, 1976, 1977, 1978, 1984, 1985, 1993, 2002, 2006, 2011, 2014, 2017 (1993–2006 as Oughteragh Gaels, a union with Aughnasheelin; 2014 as St. Felim's, a union with Aughavas)

=== Ladies' football ===
- Leitrim Intermediate Ladies' Football Championship (1): 2014 (as Oughteragh Gaels, a union with Aughnasheelin

=== Hurling ===
- Leitrim Senior Hurling Championship (3): 1971, 1987, 2015 (1971 as St Bridget’s, a union with Aughnasheelin)
- Leitrim Minor Hurling Championship (13): 1967, 1971, 1985, 1987, 1988, 1991, 1992, 1993, 1994, 2008, 2009, 2013, 2014 (1971 as St Bridget’s, a union with Aughnasheelin)

== Notable players ==
- Columba Cryan: Railway Cup-winner (1957, 1958)
