= Allen Gaels GAA =

Leitrim-based Gaelic games club

Allen Gaels
- Gaeil na hAilne
- Founded: 1969
- County: Leitrim
- Colours: Sky Blue and Navy
- Grounds: Shane McGettigan Memorial Park, Ballinamore Road, Drumshanbo
- Coordinates: 54.044862°N 8.031676°W

Playing kits
Standard colours

Senior Club Championships
	All Ireland	Connacht champions	Leitrim champions
Football:	-	-	5
Hurling:	-	-	2

Allen Gaels Gaelic Athletic Association is a Gaelic football and ladies' Gaelic football club based in Drumshanbo, County Leitrim, Ireland.

== History ==
The first GAA club was founded in Drumshanbo in 1889, St Patrick's. It died and was revived several times. As St. Francis', they won the 1963 Leitrim Junior Football Championship. In 1969 Drumshanbo merged with Ballinaglera to form Allen Gaels, taking their name from nearby Lough Allen.

The club won two Leitrim Senior Hurling Championships in the 1970s. Ballinaglera left in 1981 to re-form their own club, but Drumshanbo continued with the "Allen Gaels" name.

The club's peak came in 1991–2002, winning five senior football titles in twelve years. In 1997 Allen Gaels reached the final of the Connacht Senior Club Football Championship, losing to Corofin. Noel Moran, Padraig Kenny, and Colin McGlynn also played on the successful Leitrim team of that era.

Allen gaels won the Leitrim Intermediate Championship in 2025.

In 1999, Allen Gaels' grounds were renamed the Shane McGettigan Memorial Park.

== Honours ==
=== Gaelic football ===
- Leitrim Senior Football Championship (5): 1991, 1996, 1997, 2001, 2002
- Leitrim Intermediate Football Championship (1): 1989, 2025
- Leitrim Junior Football Championship (4): 1963 (as Drumshanbo St Francis), 1987, 1994, 2008
- Leitrim Minor Football Championship (2): 1965, 1967 (both as Drumshanbo St Francis)1994 as Allen Gaels

St Francis ( Ballinaglera and Drumshanbo amalgamation ) 1992, 1994, 1996, 1997

=== Hurling ===
- Leitrim Senior Hurling Championship (2): 1975, 1977

== Notable players ==
- John Owens
