= St Mary's GAA (Leitrim) =

Leitrim-based Gaelic games club

St Mary's Kiltoghert GAA
- Naomh Muire, Cill Tochairt
- Founded: 1944
- County: Leitrim
- Colours: Blue & White
- Grounds: Pairc Naoimh Mhuire (Castlecara Rd), Park Lane
- Coordinates: 53°56′50″N 8°04′30″W

Playing kits
Standard colours

Senior Club Championships
	All Ireland	Connacht champions	Leitrim champions
Football:	-	-	6
Hurling:	-	1	32

St Mary's Kiltoghert, is a Gaelic Athletic Association club, it is based in the parish of Kiltoghert which is near Carrick-on-Shannon, County Leitrim, Ireland. In March 1944 the club was founded. They have won 6 Leitrim Senior Football Championships in 1958, 1995, 2003, 2007, 2013 and 2022. They have won 31 Leitrim Senior Hurling Championships including 12 in a row between 1999 and 2010.

St.Mary’s Kiltoghert GAA has close to 900 members, competing at all club levels. There are 4 men’s teams, 2 women’s teams, a ‘Mothers and Others’ team, All Stars, hurling and camogie at senior and under age levels.

== Location ==
St Mary's Kiltoghert GAA club is located within the parish of Kiltoghert County Leitrim. The parish includes areas such as Gowel, Jamestown, Leitrim and Carrick on Shannon. Carrick on Shannon is the biggest town in the parish of Kiltoghert and is where the GAA club is based.

Páirc Naomh Mhuire is located in Carrick on Shannon on the Castlecara road. N41 C8Y1. The club also owns a pitch located in the town on priests lane.

== Under age teams ==
St Mary's have underage Boys and Girls teams serving ages 4 to 20, with the size of the club there are two teams for every age group. The underage teams compete in the Leitrim league and championship throughout every year. The club also has hurling and camogie underage teams.

In 2024 St Mary's underage ladies teams enjoyed plenty of success by winning the u-14,u-16 and minor division 1 titles.

Results, tables and upcoming fixtures for all teams can be found on Leitrim GAA-CLG Liotroma

== Developments and funding ==
In 2024 St Mary's Kiltoghert received significant funding from the government. St Mary's GAA club Kiltoghert received €166,124 for clubhouse development.

In September 2024 St Mary's Kiltoghert received permission from Leitrim county council for a major development in club facilities. The club's application included building three playing pitches, temporary dressing rooms, a spectator stand, along with a car park with road access. The sight where this is due to be built is on the Castlecara road near Páirc Naomh Mhuire.

== Fundraising ==
St Mary's Kiltoghert have plenty of fundraising methods to bring money into the club. The club has a membership fee, the club lotto

and the club also puts on special events such as dinner dances.

In 2024 ST Mary's Kiltoghert joined their rival club Mohill GAA to sell a house in Carrick on Shannon at priors point. St Mary's GAA and Mohill GAA bought a house and now are selling tickets to the two communities in order to raise money for the development of both clubs.

== Football Gear ==
St Marys Kiltoghert use 'O Neill's' as their supplier for all football gear including socks, shorts and tops. Gear can be purchased on the O'neils online shop. St Mary's Kiltoghert GAA Online Shop

== Honours ==
- Leitrim Senior Football Championship 6:
  - 1958, 1995, 2003, 2007, 2013, 2022
- Leitrim Senior Hurling Championship 32:
  - 1953, 1957, 1958, 1960, 1961, 1962, 1967, 1970, 1972, 1976, 1978, 1980, 1982, 1992, 1993, 1994, 1995, 1997, 1999, 2000, 2001, 2002, 2003, 2004, 2005, 2006, 2007, 2008, 2009, 2010, 2014, 2017
- Connacht Junior Club Hurling Championship 1:
  - 2018
- Leitrim Intermediate Football Championship: 4
  - 1995, 1997, 2000, 2004
- Leitrim Junior Football Championship: 6
  - 1945, 1953, 1956, 2002, 2014, 2023
- Leitrim Minor Football Championship: 9
  - 1965, 1988, 1991, 1992, 1995, 2001, 2010, 2018, 2019
