= Aughawillan GAA =

Leitrim-based Gaelic games club

- Achadh an Mhuilinn · Achadh Mhaoláin · Achadh Mhaoileann
- Founded: 1890
- County: Leitrim
- Nickname: The Willies
- Colours: Blue and White
- Grounds: Páirc Achadh Mhaoileann, Sraloaghan
- Coordinates: 54.091533°N 7.758505°W

Playing kits
Standard colours

Senior Club Championships
	All Ireland	Connacht champions	Leitrim champions
Football:	-	-	12
Ladies' football:	–	–	19

Aughawillan GAA is a Gaelic Athletic Association Gaelic football club in Lower Drumreilly parish, County Leitrim, Ireland.

== Grounds ==
Aughawillan is located near the County Cavan border, 5 kilometres (3.1 mi) northeast of Ballinamore.

== History ==
Aughawillan claim their origins from the Rory O'Donnells club which played in 1890. They are the best football team ever to play in Leitrim. A team from the locality played under the names Kiltyhugh and Lower Drumreilly, winning the 1923 Leitrim Senior Football Championship.

A ladies' Gaelic football club was founded in the 1970s and has won nineteen county championships.

The current grounds opened in 1982.

Aughawillan have won 12 senior football county titles and have reached the final of the Connacht Senior Club Football Championship on two occasions, in 1992 and 1994.

== Achievements ==
- Connacht Senior Club Football Championship: Runner-Up 1992, 1994
- Leitrim Senior Football Championship: Winners (12) 1923, 1976, 1978, 1983, 1984, 1989, 1992, 1993, 1994, 2014, 2016, 2018
- Leitrim Ladies' Senior Football Championship: Winners (19) 1979, 1984, 1988, 1989, 1990, 1994, 1997, 1998, 1999, 2000, 2001, 2003, 2004, 2005, 2006, 2007, 2008, 2009, 2013

== Notable players ==
- Mickey Quinn
- Frank Darcy
- Declan Darcy
