= Glencar–Manorhamilton GAA =

Leitrim-based Gaelic games club

Glencar–Manorhamilton
- Gleann an Chairthe–Cluainín
- Founded: 1968
- County: Leitrim
- Nickname: Glencar/Manor
- Colours: Saffron and Blue
- Grounds: Boggaun, Manorhamilton
- Coordinates: 54.269943°N 8.198943°W

Playing kits
Standard colours

Senior Club Championships
	All Ireland	Connacht champions	Leitrim champions
Football:	-	-	7
Hurling:	-	-	3
Ladies' football:	–	–	6

Glencar–Manorhamilton GAA is a Gaelic football, hurling and ladies' Gaelic football club based in Manorhamilton and the Glencar valley, County Leitrim, Ireland. The hurling team play under the name Cluainín Iomáint (Manorhamilton Hurling).

== History ==
The club was founded in 1968; it was predated by the St Patrick's, Manorhamilton Gaelic football club and the Cluainín Uí Ruairc hurling club.

They were based at The Bee Park in Manorhamilton from 1988. They moved to their current grounds in Boggaun in 2017.

== Honours ==
- Leitrim Senior Football Championship (7): 1977, 1999, 2008, 2009, 2010, 2011, 2019
- Leitrim Intermediate Football Championship (3): 1971, 2005, 2013
- Leitrim Junior Football Championship (4): 1958, 1970, 1982, 1999
- Leitrim Senior Hurling Championship (3): 2012, 2013, 2016, 2021
- Leitrim Ladies' Senior Football Championship (6): 2020, 2021, 2022, 2023, 2024, 2025
