= 2025 Ulster Senior Football Championship final =

Ulster Championship Match

2025 Ulster SFC Final
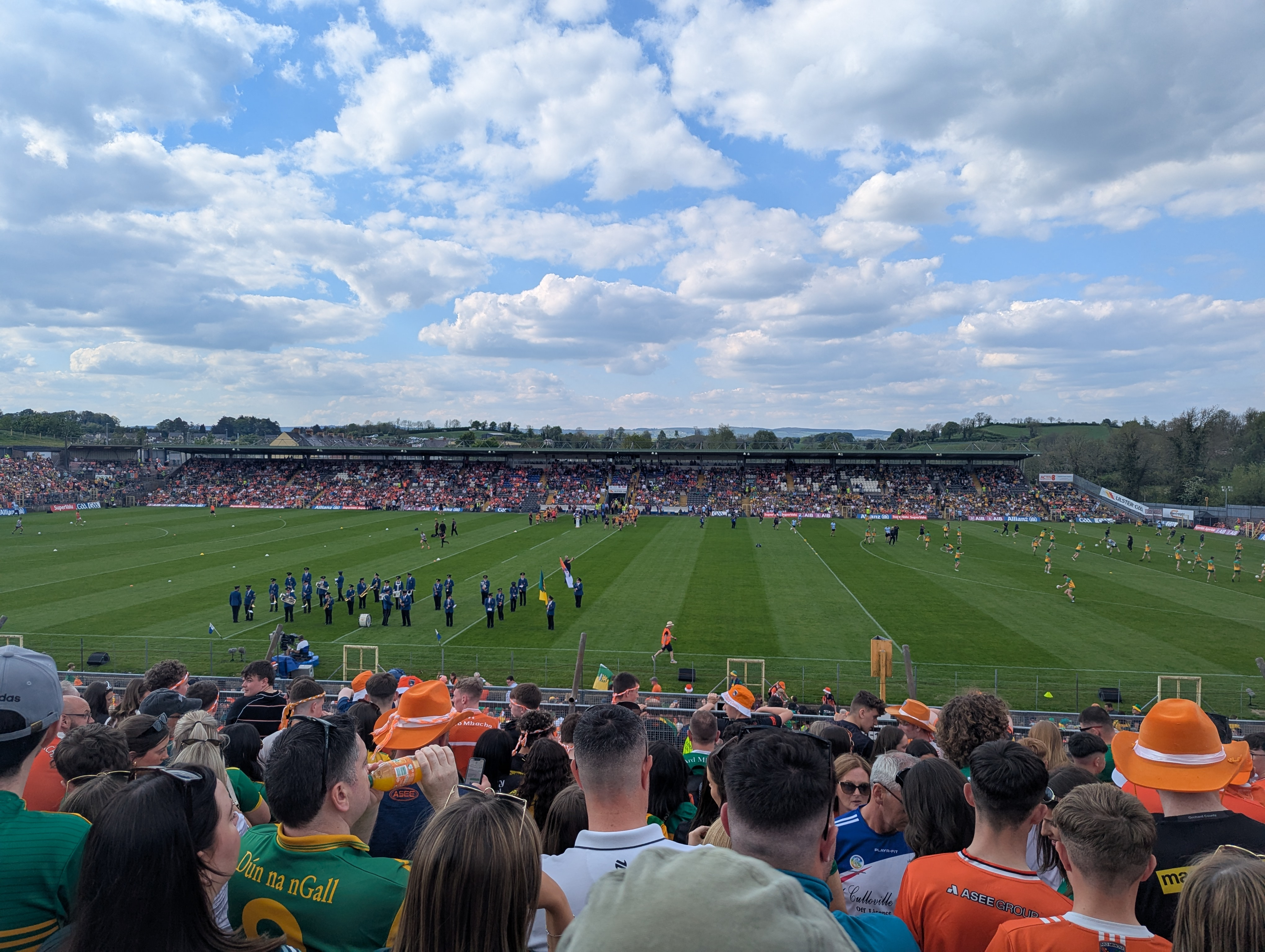
- Event: 2025 Ulster Senior Football Championship
Armagh	Donegal
0-28 (28)	2-23 (29)
- A.E.T.
- Date: 10 May 2025
- Venue: St Tiernach's Park, Clones
- Man of the Match: Michael Murphy (Donegal)
- Referee: Brendan Cawley (Kildare)
- Attendance: 28,788

The 2025 Ulster Senior Football Championship Final was the showpiece game of that year's Ulster Senior Football Championship; one of four provincial championships and part of the 2025 All-Ireland Senior Football Championship.

The game was won by defending champions Donegal, who defeated defending All-Ireland Champions Armagh by one point, with a score of 2-23 (29) to 0-28 (28).

The game was played at St Tiernach's Park, Clones, Co. Monaghan on Saturday 10 May 2025 and was immediately preceded by the Ladies' Gaelic Football Ulster Senior Championship Final between the same two counties.

Armagh appeared in their third consecutive Ulster Final, aiming to capture the county's first provincial title since 2008, while Donegal were the defending champions, having beaten Armagh at the same stage in 2024.

Kildare's Brendan Cawley was the referee.

== Paths to the final ==
Donegal entered the championship in the preliminary round, where they faced Derry at Ballybofey on 6 April, winning by 10 points. At the quarter-final stage, they faced Monaghan at Clones, winning by two points. In the semi-final, the faced 2024 Tailteann Cup winners Down, winning by six points.

Armagh's opening game came against Antrim at Belfast's Corrigan Park on 12 April. The game had been moved by Ulster GAA to Páirc Esler in Newry, but a successful campaign - including a proposed boycott by the Antrim team saw the game being staged at the West Belfast venue. Armagh won the contest by 11 points, and faced Tyrone in the semi-final at Clones on 26 April, winning the tie by one point.

== Match ==
=== Details ===
RTÉ
BBC

10 May 2025
17:25
Final

Donegal	2–23 – 0–28	Armagh
(HT: 0–16 – 0–11)
Gls: C Moore (1) H McFadden (1); Pts: P Mogan (1) C Moore (1) C Thompson (4) M Langan (2) D Ó Baoill (1) P McBrearty (3) M Murphy (3) O Gallen (4) C O'Donnell (1) J McGee (1) N O'Donnell (2)		Pts: E Rafferty (3) R McQuillan (3) J Óg Burns (1) C O'Neill (1) B Crealy (1) O Conaty (6) A Murnin (1) O O'Neill (7) J Duffy (1)

St Tiernach's Park, Clones
Referee: Brendan Cawley (Kildare)
Attendance: 28,788
Standby: Joe McQuillan (Cavan)
Linesman: David Coldrick (Meath)
Sideline: Conor Dourneen (Cavan)
Umpires: Eoghan Fitzpatrick, Johnny Farrell, Dave Coady, Lee Moore

Donegal	Armagh

1	Shaun Patton
2	Finnbarr Roarty
3	Brendan McCole	(substituted off) 83'
4	Peadar Mogan
5	Ryan McHugh	(substituted off) 78'
26	Caolan McGonagle
7	Ciarán Moore	(substituted off) 54' (substituted on) 81'
8	Ciarán Thompson
9	Michael Langan
10	Daire Ó Baoill	(substituted off) 51' (substituted on) 78'
24	Hugh McFadden	(substituted off) 49'
12	Shane O'Donnell	(substituted off) 81'
13	Patrick McBrearty (c)	(substituted off) 42' (substituted on) 76'
14	Michael Murphy	(substituted off) 76'
15	Oisín Gallen	(substituted off) 64'
Substitutes:
16	Gavin Mulreany
17	Mark Curran
18	Odhran McFadden Ferry
19	Odhrán Doherty
20	Aaron Doherty	(substituted on) 64'
21	Eoin McHugh	(substituted on) 54'
22	Jason McGee	(substituted on) 49'
23	Jamie Brennan	(substituted on) 51' (substituted off) 71'
11	Conor O'Donnell	(substituted on) 42'
25	Niall O'Donnell	(substituted on) 71'
6	Stephen McMenamin	(substituted on) 83'
Manager:
Jim McGuinness

1	Ethan Rafferty
2	Paddy Burns
3	Barry McCambridge
17	Aidan Forker (c)	(substituted off) 61'
5	Ross McQuillan	(substituted off) 87'
6	Greg McCabe	(substituted off) 54'
7	Jarly Óg Burns
8	Callum O'Neill	(substituted off) 49'
9	Ben Crealey
10	Darragh McMullen
11	Rory Grugan	(substituted off) 83'
12	Oisín Conaty	(substituted off) 78'
24	Tiernan Kelly	(substituted off) 41'
14	Andrew Murnin	(substituted off) 71'
15	Oisín O'Neill	(substituted off) 59'
Substitutes:
16	Blaine Hughes
4	Peter McGrane	(substituted on) 54'
18	Tomás McCormack	(substituted on) 87'
19	Connaire Mackin	(substituted on) 71'
20	Jason Duffy
21	Niall Grimley	(substituted on) 61'
22	Shane McPartlan	(substituted on) 83'
23	Cian McConville	(substituted on) 78'
13	Conor Turbitt	(substituted on) 41'
25	Stefan Campbell	(substituted on) 49'
26	Jemar Hall
Manager:
Kieran McGeeney

Man of the Match:
Michael Murphy (Donegal)
