= 2024 Galway county football team season =

Galway
2024 season
- Manager: Pádraic Joyce
- Stadium: Pearse Stadium, Salthill
- NFL D1: 6th
- All-Ireland SFC: Finalist
- Connacht SFC: Winner
- FBD: Finalist

The following is a summary of Galway county football team's 2024 season.

== Competitions ==
=== FBD ===
Galway began the season with an FBD semi-final against Leitrim.

==== Fixtures ====
12 January 2024 Semi-final	Leitrim	1–17 (20) – (24) 2–18	Galway	Bekan
19:00 GMT (UTC±0)		(HT: 0–9 – 0–10)		Venue: Connacht GAA Centre of Excellence
		Report

19 January 2024 Final	Galway	0–13 (13) – (31) 2–25	Roscommon	Bekan
19:30 GMT (UTC±0)		(HT: 0–6 – 1–14)		Venue: Connacht GAA Centre of Excellence
		Report

=== National Football League Division 2 ===
==== Table ====
Pos	Team	Pld	W	D	L	PF	PA	PD	Pts	Qualification
1	Derry	7	6	0	1	138	100	+38	12	Advance to NFL Final
2	Dublin (Note: Dublin are ranked ahead of Kerry because they won the head-to-head game between the teams)	7	5	0	2	154	105	+49	10	Advance to NFL Final
3	Kerry	7	5	0	2	124	113	+11	10	
4	Mayo	7	4	0	3	115	108	+7	8	
5	Tyrone	7	3	0	4	104	126	−22	6	
6	Galway	7	2	1	4	94	109	−15	5	
7	Roscommon	7	1	1	5	92	115	−23	3	Relegation to 2025 NFL Division 2
8	Monaghan	7	1	0	6	103	148	−45	2	Relegation to 2025 NFL Division 2

Source: GAA.ie
Rules for classification: Tiebreakers

==== Fixtures ====
28 January 2024 Round 1	Galway	0–10 (10) – (18) 2–12	Mayo	Salthill
13:45 IST (UTC+1)				Venue: Pearse Stadium
	Pts: Shane Walsh 4 (2f), Liam Ó Conghaile 2, Cathak Sweeney 1, Dylan McHugh 1, Cillian Ó Curraoin 1, Matthew Tierney 1	Report	Gls: Eoghan McLaughlin 1, Cillian O'Connor 1 (1 pen); Pts: Fergal Boland 3, Ryan O'Donoghue 2 (2f), Paul Towey 2, Jordan Flynn 2, Paddy Durcan 1, Bob Tuohy 1, Jack Carney 1	Referee: Sean Hurson (Tyrone)

4 February 2024 Round 2	Roscommon	0–9 (9) – (9) 0–9	Galway	Roscommon
14:00 IST (UTC+1)				Venue: Dr Hyde Park
	Pts: Conor Cox 5 (4f), Ruaidhrí Fallon 1, Daire Cregg 1, Ben O'Carroll 1, Diarmuid Murtagh 1 (1f)	Report	Pts: Cillian Ó Curraoin 3 (2f), Robert Finnerty 2 (2f), Matthew Tierney 2 (1f), Paul Conroy 1 (1f), Kieran Molloy 1	Referee: Conor Lane (Cork); Attendance: 6,128

18 February 2024 Round 3	Tyrone	0–12 (12) – (13) 1–10	Galway	Omagh
13:45 IST (UTC+1)				Venue: Healy Park
	Pts: N Morgan 2 (1f), C Devlin 1, M McKernan 1, P Harte 1, C Kilpatrick 1, D Canavan 3 (1f), C Daly 3 (1 m)	Report	Gls: C Sweeney 1 Pts: C Gleeson; J McGrath 1, P Conroy 1, J Heaney 2, M Tierney 1, R Finnerty 4 (1f, 1 m), D O'Flaherty 1	Referee: Joe McQuillan (Cavan)

25 February 2024 Round 4	Galway	1–11 (14) – (19) 3–10	Derry	Salthill
13:45 IST (UTC+1)				Venue: Pearse Stadium
	Gls: C Darcy 1 Pts: J Daly 1, K Molloy, D O’Flaherty 1, J Heaney 1f, R Finnerty 5 (4fs), N Daly 1, C Ó Curraoin 2 (1f)	Report	Gls: E McEvoy 1, Paul Cassidy 1, S McGuigan 1 (pen); Pts: C Glass 3 (1 m), B Rogers 1, C McFaul 1, Paul Cassidy 1f, N Loughlin 1, S McGuigan 2fs	Referee: Derek O'Mahoney (Tipperary)

3 March 2024 Round 5	Monaghan	0–14 (14) – (21) 3–12	Galway	Clones
15:15 IST (UTC+1)				Venue: St Tiernach's Park
	Pts: Ryan O'Toole 1, Michael Hamill 2, Mícheál Bannigan 2 (1f, 1 m), Dessie Ward 2, Jack McCarron 4 (2f, 1 m), Conor McCarthy 2, Conor McManus 1f	Report	Gls: John Maher 1, Cathal Sweeney 1, Rory Cunningham 1 Pts: Seán Kelly 1, Rob Finnerty 2f, Rory Cunningham 3, Cillian Ó Curraoin 5 (4f, 1 m)	Referee: Barry Cassidy (Derry)

16 March 2024 Round 6	Galway	0–14 (14) – (22) 0–22	Dublin	Salthill
15:15 IST (UTC+1)				Venue: Pearse Stadium
	Pts: J McGrath 1, J Maher 1, C Sweeney 1, C Ó Curraoin 8 (5fs), R Cunningham 1, L Ó Conghaile 1, J McCabe 1	Report	Pts: E Comerford 1f, T Lahiff 2, K McGinnis 2, B Fenton 1, R McGarry 2, S Bugler 3, C Kilkenny 1, C O'Callaghan 9 (5fs, 1 m), C Basquel 1	Referee: Brendan Cawley (Kildare)

24 March 2024 Round 7	Kerry	0–15 (15) – (13) 1–10	Galway	Killarney
13:45 IST (UTC+1)				Venue: Fitzgerald Stadium
	Pts: A Heinrich 1, J O'Connor 1, P Geaney 1, S O'Brien 1, K Spillane 4 (1f), D Roche 1, S O'Shea 4 (2f), P Clifford 1, D Clifford 1f	Report	Gls: T Culhane 1 Pts: D McHugh 1, John Daly 1, Paul Conroy 2, Johnny Heaney 2, C Sweeney 1, R Finnerty 2 m, C Ó Curraoin 1	Referee: Séamus Mulhare (Laois)

=== Connacht Senior Football Championship ===
==== Bracket ====
Quarter-finals

Semi-finals

Final

Leitrim
0-06

Sligo
0-15

Sligo
0-14

Galway
1-13

London
0-09

Galway
5-21

Galway
0-16

Mayo
0-15

New York
2-06

Mayo
2-21

Roscommon
0-13

Mayo
1-15

==== Fixtures ====
6 April 2024

Report

London	0–9 (9) – (36) 5–21	Galway

McGovern Park, Ruislip
Referee: Liam Devenney (Mayo)

20 April 2024

Report

Sligo	0–14 (14) – (16) 1–13	Galway
(HT: 0-9 – 0-6)
Pts: Niall Murphy 0-3 (1f, 1 m'), Patrick O'Connor 0-3, Alan McLoughlin 0-2, Nathan Mullen 0-1, Darragh Cummins 0-1, Seán Carrabine 0-1, Canice Mulligan 0-1, Cian Lally 0-1, Mikey Gordon 0-1		Gls: Robert Finnerty 1 Pts: Robert Finnerty (0-05, 1f), Céin Darcy (0-02), Damien Comer (0-02), Dylan McHugh (0-01), Johnny Heaney (0-01), Shane Walsh (0-01), Kieran Molloy (0-01)

Markievicz Park, Sligo
Referee: Barry Tiernan (Dublin)
Attendance: 4,597

5 May 2024
16:00
Final

Galway	0–16 – 0–15	Mayo
R. Finnerty 0-08 (5f), S. Walsh 0-03 (1f), C. Gleeson 0-02 (2f), D. Comer 0-02, J. Heaney 0-01	Report	R. O'Donoghue 0-05 (4f), M. Ruane 0-03, T. Conroy 0-02, F. Boland 0-01, D. McHugh 0-01, J. Flynn 0-01, C. O'Connor,

Pearse Stadium, Galway
Attendance: 19,193
Referee: Sean Hurson (Tyrone)

=== All-Ireland Senior Football Championship ===
Galway were drawn into Group 1.

==== Table ====
Pos	Team	Pld	W	D	L	PF	PA	PD	Pts	Qualification
1	Armagh	3	2	1	0	57	41	+16	5	Advance to quarter-final
2	Galway	3	2	1	0	50	41	+9	5	Advance to preliminary quarter-final
3	Derry	3	1	0	2	43	55	−12	2	Advance to preliminary quarter-final
4	Westmeath	3	0	0	3	31	44	−13	0	

Source: GAA

==== Fixtures ====
18 May 2024 Round 1	Galway	2–14 – 0–15	Derry	Salthill
17:30	Finnerty 0-4 (2f), Conroy 0-3, Darcy 1-0, Kelly 1-0, Daly 0-2, Walsh 0-2, Heaney 0-1, Ó Curraoin 0-1, Tierney 0-1	Report	McGuigan 0-4 (1f), Murray 0-3, McFaul 0-2, Bradley 0-1, Cassidy 0-1, Doherty 0-1, Gilmore 0-1, Glass 0-1, Rogers 0-1	Stadium: Pearse Stadium; Attendance: 7,602; Referee: Brendan Cawley (Kildare)

2 June 2024 Round 2	Westmeath	0–11 – 1–12	Galway	Mullingar
15:00	Heslin 0-5f, Wallace 0-2, Connellan 0-1, Forde 0-1, Lynch 0-1, McCartan 0-1	Report	Walsh 1-4 (3f), Gleeson 0-2 (2'45), Tierney 0-2, Darcy 0-1, Hernon 0-1, McDaid 0-1, Molloy 0-1	Stadium: TEG Cusack Park; Referee: Niall Cullen (Fermanagh)

16 June 2024 Round 3	Armagh	1–12 – 0–15	Galway	Sligo
13:45	Kelly 1-1, Turbitt 0-4 (1f), R O'Neill 0-3, Murnin 0-2, Campbell 0-1, Crealey 0-1	Report	Walsh 0-5 (3f), Finnerty 0-3 (2f), Conroy 0-2, Maher 0-1, McDaid 0-1, McHugh 0-1, Silke 0-1, Tierney 0-1	Stadium: Markievicz Park; Attendance: 8,870; Referee: Sean Hurson (Tyrone)

Galway advanced to a preliminary quarter-final against Monaghan.

22 June 2024 Preliminary quarter-final	Galway	0–14 – 0–11	Monaghan	Salthill
16:00	Finnerty 0-5 (3f), Conroy 0-3, Tierney 0-2f, Comer 0-1, Maher 0-1, Ó'Conghaile 0-1, Walsh 0-1f	Report	McCarron 0-3 (2f), Bannigan 0-2 (1f), McManus 0-2f, O'Hanlon 0-2, McCarthy 0-1, Mohan 0-1	Stadium: Pearse Stadium; Attendance: 6,768; Referee: Sean Lonergan (Tipperary)

29 June 2024 Quarter-final	Dublin	0–16 – 0–17	Galway	Dublin
18:15	Costello 0-4 (2f, 1'45), O'Callaghan 0-4 (2m, 1f), Bugler 0-2, Kilkenny 0-2, Fenton 0-1, Mannion 0-1, McGarry 0-1, Small 0-1m	Report	Walsh 0-7 (4f), McDaid 0-3, Conroy 0-1, Culhane 0-1, Darcy 0-1, Heaney 0-1, Maher 0-1, McHugh 0-1, Tierney 0-1m	Stadium: Croke Park; Attendance: 49,896; Referee: Sean Hurson (Tyrone); Man of the Match: Cillian McDaid (Galway)

14 July 2024 Semi-final	Donegal	0–15 – 1–14	Galway	Dublin
16:00	Langan 0-4, Gallen 0-3, McBrearty 0-3 (1f), S. O'Donnell 0-2, Thompson 0-2 (1m), McGonagle 0-1	Report	Conroy 1-1, Finnerty 0-4 (2f), Walsh 0-3 (2f), McHugh 0-2, Silke 0-2, Maher 0-1, McDaid 0-1	Stadium: Croke Park; Attendance: 67,002; Referee: Brendan Cawley (Kildare); Man of the Match: Dylan McHugh (Galway)

28 July 2024 Final	Armagh	1–11 – 0–13	Galway	Dublin
15:30	Conaty 0-3, McKay 1-0, Crealey 0-2, Forker 0-1, Grimley 0-1, Kelly 0-1, McCambridge 0-1, O. O'Neill 0-1, R. O'Neill 0-1	Report	Conroy 0-3, Darcy 0-3, McDaid 0-2, Walsh 0-2 (1f), Finnerty 0-1f, Maher 0-1, Silke 0-1	Stadium: Croke Park; Referee: Sean Hurson (Tyrone)
