= 2024 All-Ireland Senior Football Championship final =

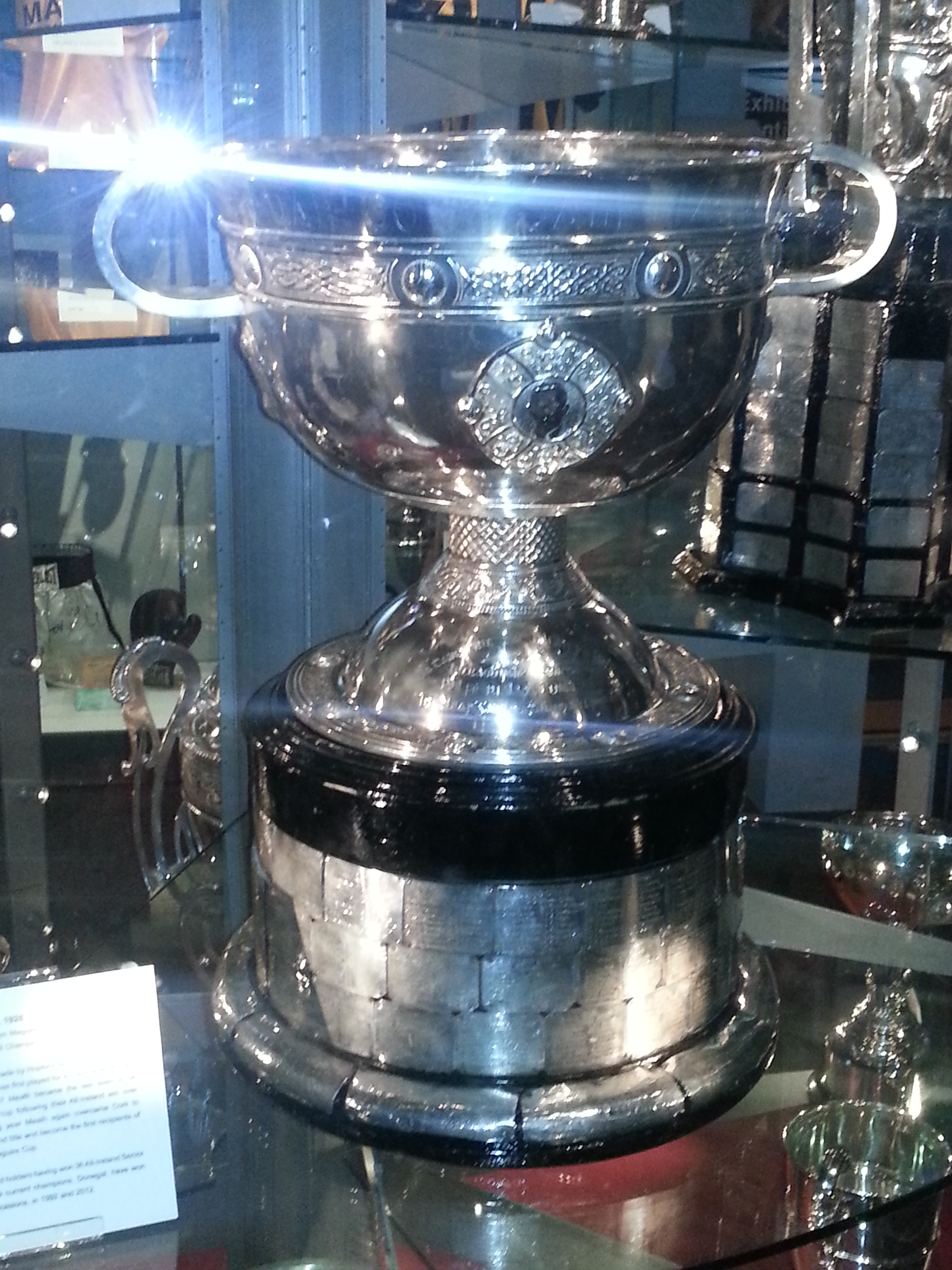
- The winning team received the Sam Maguire Cup.
- Event: 2024 All-Ireland Senior Football Championship
Armagh	Galway
1–11 (14)	0–13 (13)
- Date: 28 July 2024
- Venue: Croke Park, Dublin
- Man of the Match: Oisín Conaty
- Referee: Sean Hurson (Tyrone)
- Attendance: 82,300
- Weather: Dry with warm spells of hazy sun 18 °C (64 °F)–23 °C (73 °F)

The 2024 All-Ireland Senior Football Championship final was a Gaelic football match played at Croke Park in Dublin on 28 July 2024 between Armagh and Galway, the culmination of the 2024 All-Ireland Senior Football Championship. It was the 137th final of that sport's primary competition, the All-Ireland Senior Football Championship.

Armagh defeated the Connacht champion Galway by one point, with a score of 1–11 (14) to 0–13 (13). The teams had never previously met at this stage of the competition. For Armagh, it was a second title win (after 2002). For Galway, having recently lost the 2022 final to Kerry, the wait for a first title since 2001 went on.

The game was televised nationally on RTÉ2 as part of The Sunday Game live programme, presented by Joanne Cantwell from the Croke Park studio, with analysis from Peter Canavan, Tomás Ó Sé and Lee Keegan. Match commentary was provided by Darragh Maloney, assisted by Éamonn Fitzmaurice. The game was also televised on BBC Two in Northern Ireland and internationally on GAAGO. The BBC coverage was presented for a 2nd year in a row by Sarah Mulkerrins and was joined in studio by Mickey Harte, Oisin McConville and Michael Murphy. Commentary for the 2nd year in a row was by Thomas Niblock and Philly McMahon, with pitchside update from Mark Sidebottom and Owen Mulligan.

An average of 889,000 people watched the game, with a peak figure of 1.08 million as the match reached its climax. The game received a 76% audience share. RTÉ Player almost doubled its streaming numbers from the previous year's final between Dublin and Kerry.

== Background ==
Armagh were aiming to win their second All-Ireland; their first was in 2002. They were also beaten finalists in 1953, 1977 and 2003. Galway were aiming to win a tenth All-Ireland; this would have made them only the third county to reach double figures in the all-time rankings. Their last All-Ireland was in 2001; they were beaten finalists in 2022.

This final was the sixth to be contested by county teams from Connacht and Ulster: the others were 1925 (Galway beat Cavan), 1943 (Roscommon beat Cavan), 1948 (Cavan beat Mayo), 2012 (Donegal beat Mayo) and 2021 (Tyrone beat Mayo).

== Paths to the final ==
=== Armagh ===
14 April 2024 Ulster quarter-final	Fermanagh	0-09 - 3-11	Armagh	Enniskillen
14:00	Love 0-2, O'Brien 0-2, Cassidy 0-1f, Jones 0-1f, Kelm 0-1, McGee 0-1, McShea 0-1	Report	Campbell 1-2, Burns 1-1, Turbitt 1-0, Mackin 0-2, Murnin 0-2, Grugan 0-1f, McCambridge 0-1, O O'Neill 0-1, R O'Neill 0-1	Stadium: Brewster Park; Attendance: 7,096; Referee: Joe McQuillan, (Cavan)

27 April 2024 Ulster semi-final	Down	2-06 - 0-13	Armagh	Clones
16:00	Magill 1-1, Havern 0-2 (2f), Guiness 0-1, Johnston 0-1, Mgaill 0-1	Report	Grugan 0-5 (5f), Burns 1-0 (og.), R O'Neill 0-3 (1f), Forker 0-2, Duffy 0-1, O O'Neill 0-1, Nugent 0-1	Stadium: St Tiernach's Park; Attendance: 12,116; Referee: Liam Devenney (Mayo)

12 May 2024 Ulster final	Armagh	0-20 - 0-20 (a.e.t.) (5–6 p)	Donegal	Clones
16:00	Turbitt 0-4, Nugent 0-3 (1f), Campbell 0-2, Conaty 0-2, Crealey 0-2 (1m), Murnin 0-2, Forker 0-1, Grugan 0-1, Mackin 0-1, O O'Neill 0-1 (1m), R O'Neill 0-1 (1m)	Report	Gallen 0-6 (2f), Ó Baoill 0-2, N O'Donnell 0-2, S O'Donnell 0-2, McBrearty 0-2 (1f), Mogan 0-2, O Doherty 0-1, Langan 0-1, McGee 0-1, Mac Ceallabhuí 0-1	Stadium: St Tiernach's Park; Attendance: 28,896; Referee: Martin McNally (Monaghan)
	Penalties
	S McPartland; O Conaty; C Turbitt; A Nugent; T Kelly; S McPartland (penalty missed)		C Thompson; A Doherty; M Langan; J McGee; D Ó Baoill; A Doherty

25 May 2024 All-Ireland group stage	Armagh	0-16 - 0-11	Westmeath	Armagh
18:00	Grugan 0-5 (3f), Conaty 0-2, Nugent 0-2 (1f), Turbitt 0-2 (2f), Campbell 0-1, Kelly 0-1, Ciaran Mackin 0-1, Murnin 0-1, Conor O'Neill 0-1	Report	Heslin 0-3 (3f), Maguire 0-2, McCartan 0-2, O'Toole 0-2, Forde 0-1, Loughlin 0-1	Stadium: Athletic Grounds; Attendance: 5,989; Referee: Conor Lane (Cork)

2 June 2024 All-Ireland group stage	Derry	0-15 - 3-17	Armagh	Derry
16:00	McGuigan 0-7 (4f), Glass 0-3 (1m), Baker 0-1, Bradley 0-1, Cassidy 0-1, Doherty 0-1, Murray 0-1	Report	Turbitt 1-4 (1m,1f), R O'Neill 1-1, McQuillan 1-0, Conaty 0-2, Kelly 0-2, Crealey 0-1m, Forker 0-1, Grimley 0-1, Grugan 0-1, McCambridge 0-1, McPartlan 0-1, Nugent 0-1, O O'Neill 0-1	Stadium: Celtic Park; Referee: David Coldrick (Meath)

16 June 2024 All-Ireland group stage	Armagh	1-12 - 0-15	Galway	Sligo
13:45	Kelly 1-1, Turbitt 0-4 (1f), R O'Neill 0-3, Murnin 0-2, Campbell 0-1, Crealey 0-1	Report	Walsh 0-5 (3f), Finnerty 0-3 (2f), Conroy 0-2, Maher 0-1, McDaid 0-1, McHugh 0-1, Silke 0-1, Tierney 0-1	Stadium: Markievicz Park; Attendance: 8,870; Referee: Sean Hurson (Tyrone)

29 June 2024 All-Ireland quarter-final	Armagh	2-12 - 0-12	Roscommon	Dublin
16:00	McCambridge 1-2 (1m), Turbitt 1-2 (1f), Conaty 0-4, Campbell 0-2, Forker 0-1, Grimley 0-1	Report	Cox 0-5 (4f), Ruane 0-2, Higgins 0-1, McCormack 0-1, McDermott 0-1, Murtagh 0-1, Stack 0-1	Stadium: Croke Park; Attendance: 49,896; Referee: Martin McNally (Monaghan); Man of the Match: Barry McCambridge (Armagh)

13 July 2024 All-Ireland semi-final	Armagh	1-18 - 1-16 (a.e.t.)	Kerry	Dublin
17:30	Turbitt 0-5 (3f), McCambridge 1-0, R O'Neill 0-3, Campbell 0-2, Forker 0-2, Grimley 0-2, J Burns 0-1, Grugan 0-1f, McGrane 0-1, McQuillan 0-1	Report	Clifford 0-4 (3f), O'Shea 0-4 (1f,1'45), Murphy 1-0, Clifford 0-3, Brosnan 0-1, Burke 0-1, D Geaney 0-1, Moynihan 0-1, O'Connor 0-1	Stadium: Croke Park; Attendance: 55,548; Referee: David Gough (Meath); Man of the Match: Rian O'Neill (Armagh)

=== Galway ===
6 April 2024 Connacht quarter-final	London	0-09 - 5-21	Galway	Ruislip
15:00	Gallagher 0-3f, Clarke 0-2, Rafter 0-2, Driver 0-1, Rafferty 0-1	Report	Culhane 2-0, Conroy 1-3, D'Arcy 1-2, Finnerty 0-4 (1m), Ó Curraoin 0-4 (3f), Sweeney 1-1, Heaney 0-4, Daly 0-1, McHugh 0-1, Silke 0-1	Stadium: McGovern Park; Referee: Liam Devenney (Mayo)

20 April 2024 Connacht semi-final	Sligo	0-14 - 1-13	Galway	Sligo
15:30	Murphy 0-3 (1f, 1m), O'Connor 0-3, Alan McLoughlin 0-2, Carrabine 0-1, Cummins 0-1, Gordon 0-1, Lally 0-1, Nathan Mullen 0-1, Mulligan 0-1	Report	Finnerty 1-5 (1f), Darcy 0-2, Comer 0-2, Heaney 0-1, McHugh 0-1, Molloy 0-1, Walsh 0-1	Stadium: Markievicz Park; Attendance: 4,597; Referee: Barry Tiernan (Dublin)

5 May 2024 Connacht final	Galway	0-16 - 0-15	Mayo	Galway
16:00	Finnerty 0-8 (5f), Walsh 0-3 (1f), Gleeson 0-2f, Comer 0-2, Heaney 0-1	Report	O'Donoghue 0-6 (4f, 1m), Ruane 0-3, Conroy 0-2, Boland 0-1, McHugh 0-1, Flynn 0-1, O'Connor 0-1	Stadium: Pearse Stadium; Attendance: 19,193; Referee: David Gough Meath; Man of the Match: Damien Comer

18 May 2024 All-Ireland group stage	Galway	2-14 - 0-15	Derry	Salthill
17:30	Finnerty 0-4 (2f), Conroy 0-3, Darcy 1-0, Kelly 1-0, Daly 0-2, Walsh 0-2, Heaney 0-1, Ó Curraoin 0-1, Tierney 0-1	Report	McGuigan 0-4 (1f), Murray 0-3, McFaul 0-2, Bradley 0-1, Cassidy 0-1, Doherty 0-1, Gilmore 0-1, Glass 0-1, Rogers 0-1	Stadium: Pearse Stadium; Attendance: 7,602; Referee: Brendan Cawley (Kildare)

2 June 2024 All-Ireland group stage	Westmeath	0-11 - 1-12	Galway	Mullingar
15:00	Heslin 0-5f, Wallace 0-2, Connellan 0-1, Forde 0-1, Lynch 0-1, McCartan 0-1	Report	Walsh 1-4 (3f), Gleeson 0-2 (2'45), Tierney 0-2, Darcy 0-1, Hernon 0-1, McDaid 0-1, Molloy 0-1	Stadium: TEG Cusack Park; Referee: Niall Cullen (Fermanagh)

16 June 2024 All-Ireland group stage	Armagh	1-12 - 0-15	Galway	Sligo
13:45	Kelly 1-1, Turbitt 0-4 (1f), R O'Neill 0-3, Murnin 0-2, Campbell 0-1, Crealey 0-1	Report	Walsh 0-5 (3f), Finnerty 0-3 (2f), Conroy 0-2, Maher 0-1, McDaid 0-1, McHugh 0-1, Silke 0-1, Tierney 0-1	Stadium: Markievicz Park; Attendance: 8,870; Referee: Sean Hurson (Tyrone)

29 June 2024 All-Ireland quarter-final	Dublin	0-16 - 0-17	Galway	Dublin
18:15	Costello 0-4 (2f, 1'45), O'Callaghan 0-4 (2m, 1f), Bugler 0-2, Kilkenny 0-2, Fenton 0-1, Mannion 0-1, McGarry 0-1, Small 0-1m	Report	Walsh 0-7 (4f), McDaid 0-3, Conroy 0-1, Culhane 0-1, Darcy 0-1, Heaney 0-1, Maher 0-1, McHugh 0-1, Tierney 0-1m	Stadium: Croke Park; Attendance: 49,896; Referee: Sean Hurson (Tyrone); Man of the Match: Cillian McDaid (Galway)

14 July 2024 All-Ireland semi-final	Donegal	0-15 - 1-14	Galway	Dublin
16:00	Langan 0-4, Gallen 0-3, McBrearty 0-3 (1f), S O'Donnell 0-2, Thompson 0-2 (1m), McGonagle 0-1	Report	Conroy 1-1, Finnerty 0-4 (2f), Walsh 0-3 (2f), McHugh 0-2, Silke 0-2, Maher 0-1, McDaid 0-1	Stadium: Croke Park; Referee: Brendan Cawley (Kildare); Man of the Match: Dylan McHugh (Galway)

== Pre-match ==
Galway were favourites to win ahead of the game. Former RTÉ match analysts Pat Spillane and Colm O'Rourke both tipped Galway to win.

Members of the Meath team that won the 1999 All-Ireland Senior Football Championship final were honoured on the pitch before the game, 25 years later.

=== Fans, tickets and merchandise ===
Demand for tickets was extremely high, far exceeding supply.

Additional allocations of tickets were released, with many intending to travel from abroad to see the game.

Shops in Armagh were said to be struggling to meet demand for replica jerseys, flags and other items ahead of the game. McKeever's Sports was forced to suspend all other activities to reach its target of producing an additional 500 jerseys per day; the company was also supplying kits for several 2024 Summer Olympics participants at the time, including boxing, rowing and rugby. Armagh fans made Sam the Bear from bales of hay.

Pearse Stadium held a free, ticketed "fanzone" to allow Galway supporters who did not have tickets to watch the game on a fully high-definition television screen. One Galway "superfan" was interviewed about his intention to drive his 1953 Ford Popular motor vehicle to the game.

The build-up to the game also coincided with the annual Galway Races, where Galway's team colours and flags were on display.

=== Transport ===
Translink provided two extra trains and an additional bus service from Armagh to Dublin, all of which sold out; it added another bus from Newry, which saw similar demand. Translink also operated with improved capacity of its Enterprise train service.

=== Officials ===
On 18 July, Tyrone's Sean Hurson was named as referee for the decider, his second All-Ireland SFC final. Hurson refereed the earlier meeting between the sides at Markievicz Park in the group stage, and also refereed the 2022 All-Ireland Senior Football Championship final, Galway's previous appearance in the decider.

=== Team selection ===
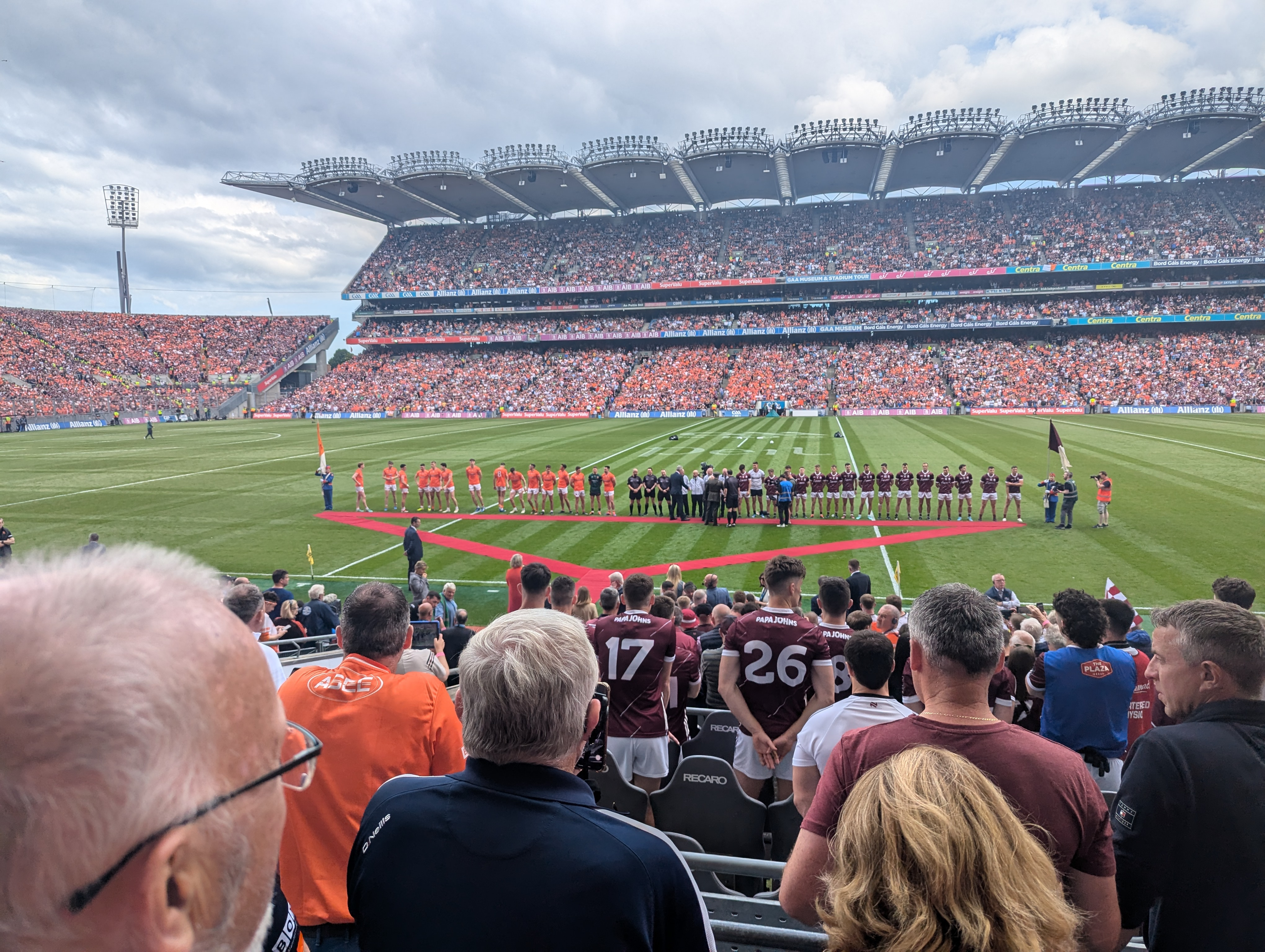
Players meet dignitaries prior to the game

Former player turned pundit Peter Canavan suggested Stefan Campbell might start the game for Armagh. Ultimately, Armagh's only change to the starting team from the semi-final victory over Kerry was Connaire Mackin in place of Peter McGrane, so Campbell began the game on the bench. Barry McCambridge switched to corner-back to accommodate Mackin in the left-half-back position.

Galway named a team that was unchanged from their semi-final. However, Céin Darcy began the game instead of Galway captain Seán Kelly. This was a late change, coming just before the game began.

== Match ==
If the game was a draw after 70 minutes, 20 minutes of extra time would have been played. If the game was still level, the final would have been replayed on 3 August 2024.

During the game, Armagh players wore jerseys with the team crest above the words "All-Ireland Senior Football Championship Final 2024".

=== Summary ===
A herring gull was seen on the pitch throughout the first half, before an official intervened and brought it away to be treated for a minor injury unrelated to play. The bird spent the opening moments of play at the Canal End of the stadium, just inside the Armagh half, before wandering into the other half of the pitch, spending much time close to the sideline near Armagh's right corner-forward; at one stage, the gull left the pitch; however, the bird made a return before being brought to safety. The gull's rescue prompted applause from spectators in Hill 16. Many spectators (and publications) erroneously referred to the bird as a "sea gull". The gull was given pain relief and fluids and was soon able to eat its meals. Galway forward Robert Finnerty also came off injured after ten minutes. Cein Darcy scored the finest point of the first half after twenty minutes, to give Galway a lead of 0–4 to 0–3. The teams were level on five occasions in the first half. Ben Crealey equalized for Armagh with the half's concluding score. The teams were tied, with 0–6 each, at half-time.

Galway's Paul Conroy scored his third point of the game in the second half. Then Cillian McDaid gave the Tribesmen a two-point lead in the 38th minute. Oisín Conaty and Rian O'Neill then scored the points that brought Armagh level once more. Armagh's Tiernan Kelly scored a point either side of two points by Galway's Shane Walsh. Armagh introduced Stefan Campbell as a substitute and, almost immediately, he set up Aaron McKay for a goal in the 47th minute, punching to the net after a pass from the left. Galway's Cein Darcy scored the next point eight minutes later. Niall Grimley, then Oisín O'Neill each scored a point for Armagh, to leave McKay's goal (i.e. three points) as the difference between the teams four minutes from the end of normal time. Points from Darcy and Cillian McDaid reduced the deficit to one. Then Galway's Dylan McHugh struck the post with his shot and the ball dropped wide. Armagh's Joe McElroy performed a crucial block against an attempt by Paul Conroy to level the game in the seventh minute of injury-time. This proved critical to Armagh's eventual one-point victory, as otherwise the game would have gone to extra-time.

The result meant that, in 2024, teams representing Ulster GAA, had won each of the available major titles in the sport. Down won the 2024 Tailteann Cup, defeating Laois in the final. Derry won the All-Ireland MFC, retaining the title by beating Armagh in a game held three weeks previous to the All-Ireland SFC final. Tyrone won the All-Ireland U20FC title in May, defeating Kerry in the final. Donegal and Derry won the 2024 National Football League Division 1 and Division 2 titles respectively (with Donegal having defeated Armagh). Glen won the All-Ireland Club SFC, Cullyhanna won the All-Ireland Club IFC and Arva won the All-Ireland Club JFC. In college football, UU won the 2024 Sigerson Cup, while Omagh CBS won the 2024 Hogan Cup. The Observer included the gull in its "alternative 2024 sports awards: quotes, gaffes and animal cameos", alongside bees swarming tennis player Carlos Alcaraz and a wild racoon chase with rubbish bins during a soccer game in the United States.

=== Details ===
RTÉ
BBC

28 July 2024
15:30
Final

Report

Armagh	1–11 – 0–13	Galway
(HT: 0–6 – 0–6)
Gls: Aaron McKay; Pts: Conaty 0-3, McKay 1-0, Crealey 0-2, Forker 0-1, Grimley 0-1, Kelly 0-1, McCambridge 0-1, O. O'Neill 0-1, R. O'Neill 0-1		Pts: Conroy 0-3, Darcy 0-3, McDaid 0-2, Walsh 0-2 (1f), Finnerty 0-1f, Maher 0-1, Silke 0-1

Croke Park, Dublin
Referee: Sean Hurson (Tyrone)
Standby: Brendan Cawley (Kildare)
Linesman: Paddy Neilan (Roscommon)
Sideline: Derek O'Mahony (Tipperary)
Umpires: Martin Coney, Cathal Forbes (Ardboe), Mel Taggart (Clonoe), Shane Dorrity (Coalisland)

Armagh	Galway

1	Blaine Hughes
2	Paddy Burns
3	Aaron McKay	(yellow card) 70'
4	Barry McCambridge
5	Connaire Mackin	(substituted off) 59'
6	Tiernan Kelly	(substituted off) 44'
7	Aidan Forker (c)
8	Niall Grimley
9	Ben Crealey
10	Joe McElroy
11	Rian O'Neill
12	Oisín Conaty
13	Rory Grugan	(substituted off) 52'
14	Andrew Murnin
15	Conor Turbitt	(substituted off) 44'
Substitutes:
16	Ethan Rafferty
17	Greg McCabe
18	Peter McGrane
19	Ciaran Higgins
20	Ross McQuillan	(substituted on) 44'
21	Shane McPartlan
22	Jason Duffy
23	Oisín O'Neill	(substituted on) 52'
24	Stefan Campbell	(substituted on) 44'
25	Aidan Nugent
26	Jarly Óg Burns	(substituted on) 59'
Manager:
Kieran McGeeney

1	Connor Gleeson
2	Johnny McGrath
3	Seán Fitzgerald
4	Jack Glynn	(substituted off) 44'
5	Dylan McHugh
6	Liam Silke
7	Séan Mulkerrin
8	Paul Conroy
9	Céin D'Arcy
10	Matthew Tierney
11	John Maher
12	Cillian McDaid
13	Robert Finnerty	(substituted off) 10'
14	Damien Comer
15	Shane Walsh
Substitutes:
16	Conor Flaherty
17	John Daly
18	Eoghan Kelly
19	Daniel O'Flaherty
20	Kieran Molloy
21	Cathal Sweeney
22	Seán Kelly (c)	(substituted on) 44'
23	Johnny Heaney	(substituted on) 10'
24	Liam Ó Conghaile
25	Tomo Culhane
26	Niall Daly
Manager:
Pádraic Joyce

Man of the Match:
Oisín Conaty (Armagh)

== Post-match ==
Armagh captain Aidan Forker accepted the Sam Maguire Cup from GAA president Jarlath Burns, also from Armagh, in the Hogan Stand. In his post-match speech, Forker summed up the Armagh journey, stating: "With faith and belief and hard work, anything is possible".

=== Reaction ===
Armagh midfielder Niall Grimley dedicated his team's victory to his brother, who had died in a road accident less than a year before.

Armagh manager Kieran McGeeney paid tribute to his "special bunch" of players after the final. Speaking to RTÉ, he said: "At times we weren't playing at our best but you have to hand it to them, they never stopped, they never quit."

Galway manager Pádraic Joyce spoke of how disappointed he was with his team's performance in the second half. Speaking to RTÉ Sport after the game, he said: "We have no one to blame but ourselves".

Highlights of the final were shown on The Sunday Game programme which aired at 9:30pm that night on RTÉ2 and was presented by Jacqui Hurley.

=== Awards ===
The Sunday Game named eight players from the winners on its Team of the Year, as well as five Galway players and two from Donegal. The TV programme gave Barry McCambridge its Footballer of the Year.

At Armagh's banquet, which was held in The Carrickdale Hotel on the night of the game, GAA President Jarlath Burns presented the Man of the Match trophy to Oisín Conaty, after RTÉ announced him as the winner on The Sunday Game. No other nominations for the award were mentioned. Conaty was also voted Footballer of the Week on the GAA.ie website on 30 July, two days after the final.

=== Celebrations ===
The Armagh team had a homecoming celebration the day after the final at the Athletic Grounds in Armagh where thousands of fans gathered and lined the streets which started at 3:30 pm, with the team arriving at 5 pm. The Armagh team paid a visit to Craigavon Area Hospital earlier in the day, meeting some of the young fans who were unable to make it to Croke Park.

Celebrations were despised by some members in the Unionist community when members of the PSNI were seen on social media flying flags from police patrol cars and celebrating with Armagh supporters.

Meanwhile, thousands of people gathered in St Jarlath's Park, Tuam and Pearse Stadium, Galway the day after the final to welcome home the Galway team, the runners-up.

When swimmer Daniel Wiffen, from Armagh, won the 800 metre freestyle final at the 2024 Summer Olympics in Paris, France, two days after the game, several British and Irish publications linked the gold medal performance with Armagh's All-Ireland SFC title. After qualifying from the heats in first place, Wiffen referenced Armagh's victory and, after the final, he stated "we're All-Ireland champions and Olympic gold medallists". There was also some debate as to whether Wiffen was from County Armagh or the neighbouring County Down, but Wiffen's father explained that the family home's postcode was in County Armagh and that he had gone to school in the city (at St Pat's). The Wiffen family also watched the game in Paris.

== See also ==
- Armagh v Galway (2022 All-Ireland Senior Football Championship)
