= 2026 Ulster Senior Football Championship =

Gaelic football tournament

2026 Ulster SFC
Tournament details
- Province: Ulster
- Year: 2026
- Trophy: Anglo-Celt Cup
- Date: April – May 2026
- Teams: 9
- Defending champions: Donegal

Winners
- Champions: Armagh (15th win)
- Manager: Kieran McGeeney
- Captain: Aidan Forker

Runners-up
- Runners-up: Monaghan
- Manager: Gabriel Brannigan
- Captain: Micheál Bannigan

Other
- Matches played: 8
- Website: Ulster GAA

The 2026 Ulster Senior Football Championship was the 138th instalment of the annual Ulster Senior Football Championship organised by Ulster GAA. It was one of the four provincial competitions of the 2026 All-Ireland Senior Football Championship. The draw for the 2026 Ulster Championship took place on 27 November 2025.

Donegal entered the contest as defending champions, but were eliminated in the Quarter-finals by Down. Monaghan and Armagh met in the Ulster final for the first time since the 1938 All-Ireland Senior Football Championship season when the decider was won by the Farney County. However, the Monaghan victory of 88 years ago was not to be repeated as Armagh won the match after extra-time. Aidan Forker became the first Armagh captain, since Paul McGrane in 2008, to lift the Anglo-Celt Cup after Forker's team had lost the previous three finals in 2023, 2024 and 2025.

== Draw ==
=== Bracket ===
Preliminary round

Quarter-finals

Semi-finals

Final

Derry
2-23

Antrim
1-13

Derry
3-23

Monaghan (a.e.t.)
1-30

Monaghan
0-27

Cavan
2-14

Monaghan
0-25

Armagh (a.e.t.)
2-28

Donegal
1-21

Down
3-21

Armagh
3-33

Armagh (a.e.t.)
1-17

Down
0-14

Tyrone
1-16

Fermanagh
1-24

Armagh
2-32

== Preliminary round ==
12 April 2026 Preliminary round	Armagh	1-17 (20) – (19) 1-16 (a.e.t.)	Tyrone	Armagh
16:15		(HT: 0-8 – 0-4) (FT: 0-13 – 1-10)		Venue: Athletic Grounds
	Pts: Oisin O'Neill 0-6 (1tpf, 3f), Tomas McCormack 1-1, Callum O'Neill 0-3 (2f), Conor Turbitt 0-2, Ross McQuillan 0-2, Blaine Hughes 0-1 ('45), Darragh McMullan 0-1, Cian McConville 0-1	Report	Pts: Conn Kilpatrick 0-4 (1tp), Michael McKernan 0-3 (1tp), Mattie Donnelly 0-3, Ben McDonnell 1-0, Ethan Jordan 0-2 (1f), Peter Teague 0-1, Ciaran Daly 0-1, Seanie O'Donnell 0-1, Eoin McElholm 0-1	Referee: Noel Mooney (Cavan); Attendance: 16, 091; TV: RTÉ2; BBC Two NI

== Quarter-finals ==
18 April 2026 Quarter-final	Derry	2-23 (29) – (16) 1-13	Antrim	Derry
17:00		(HT: 1-11 – 1-4)		Venue: Celtic Park
	Pts: Shane McGuigan 0-9 (1tp, 1tpf, 2f), Lachlan Murray 1-3, Paul Cassidy 1-1, Conor Doherty 0-3, Niall Loughlin 0-2, Ruairi Forbes 0-1, Eoin McEvoy 0-1, Padraig McGrogan 0-1, Ruairi O'Mianain 0-1, Brendan Rogers 0-1	Report	Pts: Niall Burns 1-3, Pat Shivers 0-2, Ryan McQuillan 0-3 (1tp), Eoghan McCabe 0-3 (1tp), Conor Hand 0-1, Paddy McAleer 0-1 (1f)	Referee: David Gough (Meath); TV: BBC Two NI, GAA+

19 April 2026 Quarter-final	Cavan	2-14 (20) – (27) 0-27	Monaghan	Clones
15:00		(HT: 0-8 – 0-15)		Venue: St Tiernach's Park
	Pts: Paddy Lynch 0-7 (1tpf, 1f), Darragh Lovett 1-1, Tiarnan Madden 1-1, Emmanuel Shehu 0-3 (1tp), Oisín Brady 0-2; Favour Shehu (red card) 68'	Report	Pts: Stephen Mooney 0-5, Rory Beggan 0-5 (1tpf, 3 45s), Dessie Ward 0-4 (1tp), Micheál Bannigan 0-3 (1f), David Garland 0-2, Stephen O'Hanlon 0-2, Andrew Woods 0-2, Aaron Carey 0-2, Karl Gallagher 0-2 (1tp)	Referee: Sean Hurson (Tyrone); TV: BBC Two NI, GAA+

25 April 2026 Quarter-final	Fermanagh	1-24 (27) – (38) 2-32	Armagh	Enniskillen
17:30		(HT: 0-4 - 1-17)		Venue: Brewster Park
	Pts: Darragh McGurn 1-12 (5tp), Conor O'Hanlon 0-4 (2tp), Brandon Horan 0-2 (1tp), Jonathan Cassidy 0-1, Garvan Jones 0-1 (1f), Sean Cassidy 0-1, Conor Love 0-1, Josh Largo Elis 0-1, Mattie McDermott 0-1	Report	Pts: Conor Turbitt 1-6 (1tpf, 1f), Jason Duffy 1-2, Oisín Conaty 0-5, Jarly Óg Burns 0-4, Oisín O'Neill 0-4, Tiernan Kelly 0-3, Ethan Rafferty 0-2 (1tpf), Ross McQuillan 0-2, Darragh McMullan 0-2 (1tp), Cian McConville 0-2 (1f)	Referee: Barry Cassidy (Derry); TV: GAA+

26 April 2026 Quarter-final	Donegal	1-21 (24) – (30) 3-21	Down	Letterkenny
15:00		(HT: 1-7 - 0-11)		Venue: O'Donnell Park
	Pts: Michael Murphy 0-7 (1tpf, 4f), Oisín Gallen 0-5, Caolan McGonagle 1-0, Conor O'Donnell 0-3, Jason McGee 0-2 (1tp), Peadar Mogan 0-2 (1tp), Shea Malone 0-2 (1tp)	Report	Pts: Pat Havern 0-7 (1tp, 4f), Daniel Guinness 1-3, Mícheál Rooney 2-0, Adam Crimmins 0-4, Odhran Murdock 0-3, Ryan McEvoy 0-2 (1tp), Caolan Mooney 0-1, Ceilum Doherty 0-1	Referee: Paddy Neilan (Roscommon); TV: GAA+

== Semi-finals ==
2 May 2026 Semi-final	Derry	3-23 (32) – (33) 1-30 (a.e.t.)	Monaghan	Armagh
17:00		(HT: 2-10 – 0-06) (FT: 3-16 – 1-22)		Venue: Athletic Grounds
	Pts: Niall Loughlin 2-1 (1f), Eoin McEvoy 1-2, Shane McGuigan 0-7 (1f), Lochlann Murray 0-6 (1tpf), Ethan Doherty 0-2, Conor Doherty 0-1, Sean Kearney 0-1, Conor Glass 0-1, Paul Cassidy 0-1, Niall Toner 0-1	Report	Pts: Micheál Bannigan 1-5 (2f), Rory Beggan 0-6 (3tpf), Dessie Ward 0-3 (1tp), Michael McCarville 0-3 (1tp), Andrew Woods 0-3 (1tp), Jack McCarron 0-3 (1tp s/l), Conor McCarthy 0-2, Stephen Mooney 0-1, Bobby McCaul 0-1, David Garland 0-1, Oisín McGorman 0-1, Karl Gallagher 0-1	Referee: Noel Mooney (Cavan); TV: GAA+

3 May 2026 Semi-final	Armagh	(42) 3-33 – 0-14 (14)	Down	Clones
16:00		(HT: 2-12 - 0-7)		Venue: St Tiernach's Park
	Pts: Conor Turbitt 2-5 (3f), Tomás McCormack 1-2, Oisín Conaty 0-5, Jarly Óg Burns 0-4, Oisín O'Neill 0-4 (1tp), Cian McConville 0-3 (1f), Andrew Murnin 0-3, Darragh McMullan 0-2 (1tp), Aaron O'Neill 0-2 (1tp), Tiernan Kelly 0-1, Peter McGrane 0-1	Report	Pts: Daniel Guinness 0-4, Pat Haverty 0-2, Liam Kerr 0-2, Ryan Magill 0-2, Barry O'Hagan 0-2 (1f), Shane Annett 0-1, Odhran Murdock 0-1	Referee: Brendan Cawley (Kildare); Attendance: 27,423; TV: BBC Two NI, RTÉ2, GAA+

== Final ==
17 May 2026 Final	Monaghan	0-25 (25) – (34) 2-28 (a.e.t.)	Armagh	Clones
16:15		(HT: 0-11 – 0-13) (FT: 0-24 – 1-21)		Venue: St Tiernach's Park
	Pts: Stephen O'Hanlon 0-6 (1tp), Conor McCarthy 0-4, Jack McCarron 0-3 (1tp), Rory Beggan 0-2 (1tpf), Andrew Woods 0-2 (1tp), Oisin McGorman 0-2, Mícheál Bannigan 0-2(1f), Karl Gallagher 0-2 (1tp), Michéal McCarville 0-1, David Garland 0-1, Ryan O'Toole 0-1, Aaron Carey 0-1	Report	Pts: Oisín Conaty 0-6, Conor Turbitt 0-5 (2f), Oisín O'Neill 1-1, Tiernan Kelly 1-0, Jarly Óg Burns 0-3 (1tp), Ross McQuillan 0-2, Rory Grugan 0-2 (1f), Joe McElroy 0-2, Andrew Murnin 0-2, Jason Duffy 0-2, Cian McConville 0-2 (2f), Darragh McMullen 0-1	Referee: Paddy Neilan (Roscommon); TV: BBC Two NI, RTÉ2, GAA+

== Stadia and attendance ==
County	Location	Province	Stadium	Capacity
Antrim	Belfast	Ulster	Corrigan Park	3,700
Armagh	Armagh	Ulster	Athletic Grounds	18,500
Cavan	Cavan	Ulster	Breffni Park	25,030
Derry	Derry	Ulster	Celtic Park	18,500
Donegal	Ballybofey	Ulster	MacCumhaill Park	17,500
Down	Newry	Ulster	Páirc Esler	20,000
Fermanagh	Enniskillen	Ulster	Brewster Park	20,000
Monaghan	Clones	Ulster	St Tiernach's Park	29,000
Tyrone	Omagh	Ulster	Healy Park	17,636

== Personnel and kits ==
County	Manager(s)	Captain(s)	Sponsors
Antrim	Mark Doran	Dermot McAleese	Fibrus Broadband
Armagh	Kieran McGeeney	Aidan Forker	Simplyfruit
Cavan	Dermot McCabe	Ciaran Brady	Kingspan Group
Derry	Ciarán Meenagh	Conor Glass	Errigal Group
Donegal	Jim McGuinness	Patrick McBrearty	Circet
Down	Conor Laverty	Pierce Laverty	EOS IT Solutions
Fermanagh	Declan Bonner	Ronan McCaffrey	Tracey Concrete
Monaghan	Gabriel Bannigan	Micheál Bannigan	Activ8 Solar Energies
Tyrone	Malachy O'Rourke	Brian Kennedy	McAleer & Rushe

== Miscellaneous ==
- It was the first Ulster final between Armagh and Monaghan since 1938.
- Armagh won their first Ulster title since 2008.
