= 2024 Donegal county football team season =

Donegal county football team
2024 season
- Manager: Jim McGuinness
- Stadium: MacCumhaill Park, Ballybofey
- NFL D2: 1st (promoted)
- All-Ireland SFC: Semi-finalist
- Ulster SFC: Winners

The following is a summary of Donegal county football team's 2024 season.

== Personnel changes ==
Reports in August 2023 suggested that Jim McGuinness would be returning for a second spell as manager, with RTÉ Sport stating on 17 August that McGuinness had already met with county board officials. On 20 August, the Donegal County Board brought forward its monthly meeting to the following evening. At that meeting, held on the evening of Monday 21 August, the return of McGuinness as manager was announced, with Colm McFadden, Neil McGee and Luke Barrett all confirmed as being on McGuinness's backroom team. When asked in mid-November 2023, McGuinness ruled out any further additions to his backroom team, though he said they were still searching for new players, with "close to 50 in total" having been investigated up until that time.

The appointment made McGuinness the first holder of a UEFA Pro Licence to manage an inter-county team. He took charge for his second term as Donegal manager at the age of 50.

In November 2023, it was announced that James Gallagher, who previously served under both Rory Gallagher and Declan Bonner, had succeeded Declan McIntyre as goalkeeping coach, making this Gallagher's third spell in that role.

== Kit ==
On 2 November 2023, a new jersey was launched at the Abbey Hotel.

== Pre-season ==
It was announced in October 2023 that McGuinness would take his team on a seven-day long training camp in December 2023, ahead of the 2024 season beginning. On Saturday, 2 December 2023, the squad departed for the warm weather camp, held in Tenerife.

In November 2023, it was announced that Donegal would play Roscommon in a challenge match at Fr Tierney Park on 17 December, the first game since McGuinness returned as manager. It was also the first senior inter-county match held at the venue for nearly four years, as it had been undergoing renovations. Proceeds were divided between the team's training fund and North West Hospice. Tickets were still available on the day of the game. McGuinness named Kevin McGettigan and Ciarán Moore as two new players to start the game. By half-time, Donegal had a lead of 0–9 to 0–2. By full-time, Donegal had a lead of 2–12 to 2–6.

== Competitions ==
=== Dr McKenna Cup ===
==== Fixtures ====
The McKenna Cup group draw was held in the Armagh City Hotel in Armagh on Wednesday evening, 13 December 2023, with Donegal appearing in Section A.

3 January 2024 Round 1	**Donegal**	**3-16 - 1-06 (Overruled)**	**Armagh**	Ballybofey
19:30 IST (UTC)				Stadium: MacCumhaill Park

7 January 2024 Round 2	**Tyrone**	**1-10 - 0-15**	**Donegal**	Omagh
13:00 IST (UTC)				Stadium: O'Neills Healy Park

Pos	Team	Pld	W	D	L	PF	PA	PD	Pts	Qualification
1	Donegal (Note: Donegal received no points for their win over Armagh as they fielded an ineligible player; Armagh did not get the points as they did not make an appeal. For the purposes of points difference, the game was not counted.)	2	2	0	0	15	13	+2	**2**	Advance to semi-final
2	Armagh	2	1	0	1	17	16	+1	**2**	Advance to semi-final
3	Tyrone	2	0	0	2	29	32	−3	**0**	

Source: Ulster GAA

=== National Football League Division 2 ===
==== Fixtures ====
Donegal were to begin with a Saturday night home fixture against Cork, which was the first fixture to be announced, on 27 October 2023. This was, however, moved to the Sunday afternoon, the following day, when all fixtures were announced on 6 December 2023 (see below).

On 6 December 2023, the GAA announced that all Division 2 Round 7 games would be played separately from the Round 7 games in Division 1, 3 and 4, on Saturday, 23 March 2024, at 19:00, including Donegal v Meath at MacCumhaill Park. The rest of the fixtures were also confirmed on 6 December 2023.

28 January 2024 Round 1	**Donegal**	**v**	**Cork**	Ballybofey
13:45 IST (UTC+1)				Venue: MacCumhaill Park

4 February 2024 Round 2	**Cavan**	**v**	**Donegal**	Cavan
16:00 IST (UTC)				Venue: Breffni Park

17 February 2024 Round 3	**Donegal**	**v**	**Fermanagh**	Letterkenny
14:00 IST (UTC+1)				Venue: O'Donnell Park

25 February 2024 Round 4	**Armagh**	**v**	**Donegal**	Armagh
15:00 IST (UTC+1)				Venue: Athletic Grounds

3 March 2024 Round 5	**Donegal**	**v**	**Louth**	Ballyshannon
14:00 IST (UTC+1)				Venue: Fr Tierney Park

16 March 2023 Round 6	**Kildare**	**v**	**Donegal**	Carlow
17:00 IST (UTC+1)				Venue: Dr Cullen Park

23 March 2024 Round 7	**Donegal**	**v**	**Meath**	Ballybofey
19:00 IST (UTC+1)				Venue: MacCumhaill Park

==== Table ====
Pos	Team	Pld	W	D	L	PF	PA	PD	Pts	Qualification
1	Donegal	7	6	1	0	128	83	+45	13	Advance to NFL Division 2 Final and promotion to 2025 NFL Division 1
2	Armagh	7	5	2	0	132	86	+46	12	Advance to NFL Division 2 Final and promotion to 2025 NFL Division 1
3	Cavan (Note: Cavan are ranked ahead of Cork because they won the head-to-head game between the teams)	7	3	1	3	103	117	−14	7	
4	Cork	7	3	1	3	119	125	−6	7	
5	Meath (Note: Meath are ranked ahead of Louth because they won the head-to-head game between the teams)	7	2	2	3	86	105	−19	6	
6	Louth	7	3	0	4	121	101	+20	6	
7	Fermanagh	7	2	1	4	94	129	−35	5	Relegation to 2025 NFL Division 3
8	Kildare	7	0	0	7	82	119	−37	0	Relegation to 2025 NFL Division 3

Source: GAA.ie
Rules for classification: Tiebreakers

=== Ulster Senior Football Championship ===
==== Fixtures ====
The draw for the 2024 Ulster Championship was made on 21 October 2023.

20 April 2024
18:15
Quarter-final

Derry	0–17 – 4–11	Donegal
E Doherty 0–4, McGuigan 0–4 (2f), Cassidy 0–2 (1m), Rogers 0–2, C Doherty 0–1, McKaigue 0–1, McKinless 0–1, Murray 0–1, Toner 0–1,	Report	Ó Baoill 2–1, Gallen 1–3 (1p,1f,1'45), Brennan 1–0, McHugh 0–2, McBrearty 0–1f, Mogan 0–1, Moore 0–1, N O'Donnell 0–1, Thompson 0–1

Celtic Park, Derry
Attendance: 14,714
Referee: David Gough (Meath)
28 April 2024
14:00
Semi-final

Donegal	0–18 – 0–16 (a.e.t.)	Tyrone
Gallen 0–3 (3f), McBrearty 0–2 (1f), McGee 0–2, Ó Baoill 0–2, S O'Donnell 0–2, Thompson 0–2 (1f), McGonagle 0–1, Mac Ceallabhuí 0–1, McCole 0–1, Mogan 0–1, N O'Donnell 0–1	Report	Canavan 0–4 (1f,1m), Morgan 0–3 (3f), Daly 0–2, McCurry 0–2 (2f), McKernan 0–2, O'Donnell 0–1, Donnelly 0–1, McShane 0–1

Celtic Park, Derry
Attendance: 14,714
Referee: Brendan Cawley (Kildare)
12 May 2024
16:00
Final

Armagh	0–20 – 0–20 (a.e.t.)	Donegal
Turbitt 0–4, Nugent 0–3 (1f), Campbell 0–2, Conaty 0–2, Crealey 0–2 (1m), Murnin 0–2, Forker 0–1, Grugan 0–1, Mackin 0–1, O O'Neill 0–1 (1m), R O'Neill 0–1 (1m)	Report	Gallen 0–6 (2f), Ó Baoill 0–2, N O'Donnell 0–2, S O'Donnell 0–2, McBrearty 0–2 (1f), Mogan 0–2, O Doherty 0–1, Langan 0–1, McGee 0–1, Mac Ceallabhuí 0–1
Penalties
S McPartland; O Conaty; C Turbitt; A Nugent; T Kelly; S McPartland (penalty missed)	5–6	C Thompson; A Doherty; M Langan; J McGee; D Ó Baoill; A Doherty

St Tiernach's Park, Clones
Attendance: 28,896
Referee: Martin McNally (Monaghan)

==== Bracket ====
Preliminary round

Quarter-finals

Semi-finals

Final

**Down**
**0–13**

Antrim
0–9

Down
2–6

**Armagh**
**0–13**

Fermanagh
0–9

**Armagh**
**3–11**

Armagh
0–20 (5)

**Donegal**
**0–20 (6)**

Derry
0–17

**Donegal**
**4–11**

**Donegal**
**0–18**

Monaghan
1–12

Tyrone
0–16

**Cavan**
**3–12**

Cavan
3–16

**Tyrone**
**1–23***

=== All-Ireland Senior Football Championship ===
==== Format ====
16 teams were divided into 4 groups of 4 teams, and played a round robin to qualify for the knockout stages of the All-Ireland SFC. Group games took place between 18 May and 16 June 2024.

==== Seeding ====
Number in brackets indicates ranking in the 2024 NFL.

Pot 1

- Dublin (2)
- Kerry (3)
- Galway (6)
- Donegal (7)

Pot 2

- Mayo (4)
- Armagh (8)
- Louth (14)
- Clare (19)

Pot 3

- Derry (1)
- Tyrone (5)
- Roscommon (9)
- Monaghan (10)

Pot 4

- Cavan (11)
- Cork (12)
- Meath (13)
- Westmeath (15)

==== Group 3 ====
===== Table =====
Pos	Team	Pld	W	D	L	PF	PA	PD	Pts	Qualification
1	Donegal	3	2	0	1	66	37	+29	**4**	Advance to quarter-final
2	Tyrone	3	2	0	1	59	48	+11	**4**	Advance to preliminary quarter-final
3	Cork	3	2	0	1	51	51	0	**4**	Advance to preliminary quarter-final
4	Clare	3	0	0	3	29	69	−40	**0**	

Source: GAA

===== Fixtures =====
25 May 2024
19:15
Round 1

Donegal	0–21 – 0–14	Tyrone
Gallen 0–7 (5f), Mogan 0–3, McBrearty 0–2 (1f), McGee 0–2, Thompson 0–2 (1m), O Doherty 0–1, Gallagher 0–1, Langan 0–1, McHugh 0–1, S O'Donnell 0–1	Report	McCurry 0–4 (1f,1m), Canavan 0–3 (3f), McGeary 0–3, Devlin 0–1, Donnelly 0–1, Morgan 0–1f, O'Donnell 0–1

MacCumhaill Park, Ballybofey
Attendance: 16,607
Referee: Joe McQuillan (Cavan)
1 June 2024
14:30
Round 2

Cork	3–9 – 0–16	Donegal
Hurley 0–3 (2f), Maguire 1–0, Powter 1–0, Taylor 1–0, Jones 0–2, O'Callaghan 0–2, Sherlock 0–1, Walsh 0–1	Report	McBrearty 0–7 (3f), Gallen 0–3 (2f), Moore 0–2, A Doherty 0–1, McHugh 0–1, McGonagle 0–1, N O'Donnell 0–1

Pairc Ui Rinn, Cork
Attendance: 7,251
Referee: Brendan Griffin (Kerry)
15 June 2024
15:00
Round 3

Clare	0–5 – 2–23	Donegal
McMahon 0–4 (3f), O'Donnell 0–1	Report	Gallen 1–4 (2'45), McHugh 1–4, McBrearty 0–5 (1f), C O'Donnell 0–2, Thompson 0–2, Curran 0–1, Langan 0–1, Mogan 0–1, Moore 0–1, O Baoill 0–1, S O'Donnell 0–1

MacHale Park, Castlebar
Referee: Derek O'Mahoney (Tipperary)

==== Knockout stage ====
===== Fixtures =====
30 June 2024
13:15
Quarter-final

Donegal	1–23 – 0–18	Louth
Mogan 0–5, Gallen 0–4 (1f), Gallagher 1–0, Langan 0–3, McHugh 0–2, Moore 0–2, C O'Donnell 0–2, Thompson 0–2, Brennan 0–1, A Doherty 0–1, McBrearty 0–1	Report	Mulroy 0–6 (4f), Durnin 0–4, Burns 0–2, Byrne 0–2, Early 0–1, L Jackson 0–1, T Jackson 0–1, Lennon 0–1

Croke Park, Dublin
Attendance: 47,406
Referee: Joe McQuillan (Cavan)
14 July 2024
16:00
Semi-final

Donegal	0–15 – 1–14	Galway
Langan 0–4, Gallen 0–3, McBrearty 0–3 (1f), S O'Donnell 0–2, Thompson 0–2 (1m), McGonagle 0–1	Report	Conroy 1–1, Finnerty 0–4 (2f), Walsh 0–3 (2f), McHugh 0–2, Silke 0–2, Maher 0–1, McDaid 0–1

Croke Park, Dublin
Attendance: 67,002
Referee: Brendan Cawley (Kildare)

===== Bracket =====
Teams in bold advanced to the next round. The provincial champions are marked by an asterisk.

Preliminary quarter-finals
Tyrone	0-12
**Roscommon**	**0-14**
Mayo	1-12 (3)
**Derry** (pens.)	**0-15 (4)**
**Louth**	**1-09**
Cork	1-08
**Galway***	**0-14**
Monaghan	0-11

Quarter-finals
**Armagh**	**2-12**
Roscommon	0-12
**Kerry***	**0-15**
Derry	0-10
**Donegal***	**1-23**
Louth	0-18
Dublin*	0-16
**Galway***	**0-17**

Semi-finals
**Armagh** (a.e.t.)	**1-18**
Kerry*	1-16
Donegal*	0-15
**Galway***	**1-14**

Final
**Armagh**	**1-11**
Galway*	0-13

== Awards ==
=== GAA.ie Football Team of the Week ===
- 29 January: Patrick McBrearty
- 6 February: Oisín Gallen
- 19 February: Ó Baoill (nominated for Footballer of the Week)
- 18 March: Mogan (nominated for Footballer of the Week)
- 2 April: Ciarán Moore, Shane O'Donnell, Ciarán Thompson, Oisín Gallen; Thompson nominated for Footballer of the Week
- 22 April: Shaun Patton, Brendan McCole, Ryan McHugh, Ó Baoill; Ó Baoill nominated for, and selected as, Footballer of the Week
- 29 April: Ryan McHugh, Jason McGee, Niall O'Donnell; Ryan McHugh nominated for, and selected as, Footballer of the Week
- 13 May: Shaun Patton, Caolan McGonagle, Ó Baoill, Mogan, Michael Langan, Niall O'Donnell, Oisín Gallen; Mogan nominated for, and selected as, Footballer of the Week
- 27 May: Eoghan Bán Gallagher, Mogan, Jason McGee, Niall O'Donnell; Mogan nominated for, and again selected as, Footballer of the Week
- 17 June: Ryan McHugh, Patrick McBrearty; Ryan McHugh nominated for, and again selected as, Footballer of the Week
- 1 July: Eoghan Bán Gallagher, Mogan, Michael Langan, Oisín Gallen; Mogan nominated for Footballer of the Week
- 15 July: Brendan McCole, Michael Langan, Oisín Gallen; Langan nominated for Footballer of the Week

=== The Sunday Game Team of the Year ===
The Sunday Game selected Peadar Mogan and Oisín Gallen on its Team of the Year.

=== GAA/GPA Young Footballer of the Year ===
Ciarán Moore was nominated.

=== All Stars ===
Donegal achieved two All Stars.

Pos.	Player	Team	Appearances
GK	Niall Morgan	Tyrone	2
RCB	Johnny McGrath	Galway	1
FB	Barry McCambridge	Armagh	1
LCB	Peadar Mogan	Donegal	1
RWB	Dylan McHugh	Galway	1
CB	Aidan Forker	Armagh	1
LWB	Craig Lennon	Louth	1
MD	Paul Conroy^{FOTY}	Galway	1
MD	Ben Crealey	Armagh	1
RWF	Rian O'Neill	Armagh	1
CF	John Maher	Galway	1
LWF	Oisín Conaty	Armagh	1
RCF	Robert Finnerty	Galway	1
FF	Oisín Gallen	Donegal	1
LCF	Conor Turbitt	Armagh	1

County breakdown

- Armagh = 6
- Galway = 5
- Donegal = 2
- Tyrone = 1
- Louth = 1
