= 2026 Armagh Senior Football Championship =

Gaelic football competition in Armagh, Northern Ireland for the 2026 season

126th Armagh Senior Football Championship

Tournament details
- County: Armagh
- Province: Ulster
- Year: 2026
- Trophy: Gerry Fegan Cup
- Sponsor: Cormac Leonard Commercials
- Date: 14 August - 18 October 2026
- Teams: 16
- Defending champions: Madden Raparees

Winners
- Champions: Crossmaglen Rangers (48th win)
- Manager: Shane Lennon
- Captain: Callum Cumiskey

Runners-up
- Runners-up: Killeavy St Moninna's
- Manager: Steven McDonnell

Promotion/Relegation
- Relegated team(s): High Moss Sarsfields; Tullysaran

Other
- Matches played: 35
- Website: Armagh GAA

The 2026 Armagh Senior Football Championship is the 126th edition of Armagh GAA's premier gaelic football tournament for senior clubs in County Armagh, Northern Ireland. The winners represent Armagh in the Ulster Senior Club Football Championship.

The championship begins with sixteen teams competing in four groups of four teams before proceeding to a knock-out format with the overall winners receiving the Gerry Fegan Cup.

Madden Raparees are the defending champions after winning their first S.F.C. title in their history against St Patrick's in the 2025 final.

High Moss Sarsfields and Tullysaran returned to the senior grade for 2026 after winning the 2026 I.F.C. title and I.A.F.L. title respectively. They replaced St Peter's Lurgan and Pearse Óg as both were relegated to the 2026 I.A.F.L.

The draw for the group stage of the championship was held on 5 August 2026.

== Championship Structure ==
The 2026 Armagh S.F.C. consists of 16 teams competing in four groups of four teams.

=== Group Stage ===
- The draw for the group stage is completely open.
- Top team in each group progresses to quarter-finals.
- The 2nd and 3rd place team in each group progresses to the preliminary quarter-finals.
- Bottom placed finishers are out of the championship for the year.

=== Preliminary Quarter-Finals ===
- 2nd placed teams are drawn against 3rd placed teams with no repeat pairings.
- Winners progress to quarter-finals.
- Losers are out of the championship for the year.

=== Quarter-Finals ===
- Preliminary quarter-final winners are drawn against 1st placed team from group stage in an open draw.
- Winners progress to semi-finals.
- Losers are out of the championship for the year.

=== Semi-Final ===
- Quarter-final winners are drawn against each other.
- Winners progress to final.

=== Final ===
- Semi-final winners play each other in final.
- Winners are awarded with Gerry Fegan Cup and progress to 2026 Ulster Senior Club Football Championship.

== Team Changes ==
The following teams have changed division since the 2025 championship season:

=== Promoted to S.F.C. ===
- High Moss Sarsfields - (I.F.C. Champions)
- Tullysaran - (I.A.F.L. Champions)

=== Relegated to I.F.C ===
- Pearse Óg - (7th S.B.F.L)
- St Peter's Lurgan (8th S.B.F.L)

== Participating Teams ==
The clubs competing in the 2026 Armagh S.F.C are:

Club	Location	Manager(s)	Pre C'ship Odds	2025 Championship Position	2026 Championship Position	Championship Titles (Pre 2026)	Last Championship Title (Pre 2026)
Armagh Harps	Armagh		40/1	Preliminary Quarter-Finalist	Non-Qualifier	21	2017
Carrickcruppen	Camlough		66/1	Quarter-Finalist	Quarter-Finalist	4	1982
Clann Éireann	Lurgan		11/10	Semi-Finalist	Semi-Finalist	4	2024
Clan na Gael	Lurgan		18/1	Non-Qualifier	Preliminary Quarter-Finalist	14	1994
Crossmaglen Rangers	Crossmaglen		7/2	Semi-Finalist	Champions	47	2023
Culloville Blues	Culloville		20/1	Preliminary Quarter-Finalist	Quarter-Finalist	0	—
Dromintee	Dromintee & Jonesborough		100/1	Non-Qualifier	Semi-Finalist	0	—
Granemore	Granemore		100/1	Preliminary Quarter-Finalist	Preliminary Quarter-Finalist	0	—
High Moss Sarsfields	Derrytrasna		100/1	I.F.C Champions	Relegated to 2027 I.F.C.	1	1990
Killeavy St Moninna's	Killeavy		4/1	Quarter-Finalist	Runners-Up	3	1948
Madden Raparees	Milford		3/1	Champions	Quarter-Finalist	1	2025
Maghery Seán MacDermott's	Maghery		20/1	Quarter-Finalist	Preliminary Quarter-Finalist	2	2020
Mullaghbawn	Mullaghbawn		33/1	Preliminary Quarter-Finalist	Quarter-Finalist	2	1995
Silverbridge Harps	Silverbridge		50/1	Non-Qualifier	Non-Qualifier	0	—
St Patrick's	Cullyhanna		12/1	Runners-Up	Preliminary Quarter-Finalist	0	—
Tullysaran	Tullysaran		125/1	Intermediate A League Champions	Relegated to 2027 I.F.C.	0	—

== Group Stage ==
=== Group 1 ===
Advance to quarter-final Advance to preliminary quarter-final

Team	Pld	W	D	L	F	A	Diff	Pts
Culloville Blues	3	3	0	0	74	41	+33	6
Maghery Seán MacDermott's	3	2	0	1	57	53	+4	4
Granemore	3	1	0	2	42	73	-31	2
Armagh Harps	3	0	0	3	47	53	-6	0

==== Round 1 ====
14 August 2026 Round 1	Maghery Sean MacDermott's	2-14 (20) – (18) 1-15	Armagh Harps	Maghery
19:15 IST (UTC+1)		(HT: 2-06 – 0-10)		Venue: Felix Hamill Park
	Pts: Jonah Feeney 1-2 (1tp), Brendan Haveron 1-1, Stefan Forker 0-2 (1f), Aidan Forker 0-2 (tpf), Padraig O'Keefe 0-2 (tp), John Mackle 0-1, Seán Toye 0-1, Ronan Lappin 0-1, Tomás Toye 0-1, Seán Hackett 0-1	Report	Pts: Oisín Hughes 0-5 (2tpf, 1f), James McCoy 1-0, Joe McElroy 0-3 (1f), James Walsh 0-3 (1tp), Tom O'Kane 0-3 (1tp), Oisín McGurgan 0-1	Referee: Kevin Faloon

15 August 2026 Round 1	Granemore	0-12 (12) – (36) 4-24	Culloville Blues	Granemore
15:30 IST (UTC+1)		(HT: 0-08 – 3-10)		Venue: Páirc Mhuire
	Pts: Eoghan O'Neill 0-4 (2tpf), Liam Rafferty 0-3 (3f), Louis Hughes 0-2 (tp), Barry Toner 0-1 (f), Jim Short 0-1, Ryan Rafferty 0-1	Report	Pts: Eoin Duffy 1-7 (2f), Dara Quinn 1-7 (1tpf), Charlie Garvey 1-1, Aaron Garvey 1-1, Taidgh O'Neill 0-2 (tpf), Ryan Garvey 0-2, Steven McCreesh 0-2, Ryan Duffy 0-1, Fergal Kiernan 0-1	Referee: Conor McGahan

==== Round 2 ====
21 August 2026 Round 2	Granemore	1-12 (15) – (13) 0-13	Armagh Harps	Granemore
19:00 IST (UTC+1)		(HT: 0-07 – 0-08)		Venue: Páirc Mhuire
	Pts: Peter Carr 0-6 (1tp), Karl McQuaid 1-1, Liam Rafferty 0-2, Cathal O'Hare 0-1, Barry Toner 0-1 (f), Brendan Boylan 0-1	Report	Pts: Oisín Hughes 0-6 (4f), Caomh Agnew 0-2 (tp), Conall McCann 0-1 ('45), Oisín McGurgan 0-1, Tom O'Kane 0-1, James Walsh 0-1, Jayson Hughes 0-1	Referee: Neil McGeown

23 August 2026 Round 2	Culloville Blues	1-17 (20) – (13) 0-13	Maghery Sean MacDermott's	Culloville
13:45 IST (UTC+1)				Venue: Culloville Blues GAC
	Pts: Eoin Duffy 1-8 (3f, 1tp), Niall Rowland 0-3, Dara Quinn 0-2, Shane Carragher 0-1, James King 0-1, Taidgh O'Neill 0-1, Ryan Duffy 0-1	Report	Pts: Stefan Forker 0-5 (1tp, 1f), Padraig O'Keefe 0-4 (1tpf), Brendan Haveron 0-2, Aidan Forker 0-1, Tomás Toye 0-1	Referee: Phillip Conway

==== Round 3 ====
28 August 2026 Round 3	Armagh Harps	1-13 (16) – (18) 0-18	Culloville Blues	Armagh
19:00 IST (UTC+1)		(HT: 1-06 – 0-10)		Venue: Páirc na Mainistreach
	Pts: Oisín McGurgan 1-2, Oisín Hughes 0-5 (1tp, 1tpf), Joe McElroy 0-4 (1tp), Conor White 0-1, James Walsh 0-1	Report	Pts: Ryan Duffy 0-4, Taidgh O'Neill 0-3 (1f), Eoin Duffy 0-2 (1f), Ryan Garvey 0-2 (tp), Shane Carragher 0-2, James King 0-1, Daire Dooley 0-1, Fergal Kieran 0-1, Aaron Garvey 0-1, Steven McCreesh 0-1	Referee: Damien Toner

28 August 2026 Round 3	Maghery Sean MacDermott's	1-21 (24 – (15) 0-15	Granemore	Maghery
19:00 IST (UTC+1)		(HT: 0-13 – 0-09)		Venue: Felix Hamill Park
	Pts: Aidan Forker 1-5 (1tpf), Stefan Forker 0-5 (1tpf, 1tp), Stephen Cusack 0-3 (1tp), Padraig O'Keefe 0-3 (2f), Ronan Lappin 0-2, Brendan Haveron 0-1, Seán Hackett 0-1, Aaron Fox 0-1	Report	Pts: Cathal O'Hare 0-5 (1tp), Liam Rafferty 0-3 (1tpf), Barry Toner 0-3 (3f), Odhran Doyle 0-2, Karl McQuaid 0-1, Jim Short 0-1	Referee: Padraig Hughes

=== Group 2 ===
Advance to quarter-final Advance to preliminary quarter-final

Team	Pld	W	D	L	F	A	Diff	Pts
Killeavy St Moninna's	3	2	1	0	66	43	+23	5
Clan na Gael	3	1	2	0	53	48	+5	4
St Patrick's	3	1	0	2	60	67	-7	2
Silverbridge Harps	3	0	1	2	33	54	-21	1

==== Round 1 ====
15 August 2026 Round 1	Clan na Gael	0-14 (14) – (14) 0-14	Killeavy St Moninna's	Lurgan
17:30 IST (UTC+1)		(HT: 0-06 – 0-05)		Venue: Davitt Park
	Pts: Stefan Campbell 0-3, Shane McPartlan 0-3 (1tp), Jamie Brady 0-1, Michael McConville 0-1, Matthew Lennon 0-1, Niall Henderson 0-1, Michael Toland 0-1, James Austin 0-1	Report	Pts: Tiarnan Brown 0-3, Fergal Boylan 0-3, Callum O'Hare 0-2 (tp), Gareth Murphy 0-2, Ronan McGuinness 0-1, Ciarán O'Hanlon 0-1, Karlan McDonnell 0-1, Caolan McConville 0-1	Referee: Martin Conroy

15 August 2026 Round 1	Silverbridge Harps	0-10 (10) – (20) 1-17	St Patrick's	Silverbridge
19:00 IST (UTC+1)		(HT: 0-04 – 0-09)		Venue: Keeley Park
	Pts: Tiarnan Murphy 0-5 (1f, 1tpf), Eoin Reel 0-2 (tp), James Martin 0-1, Conor McArdle 0-1	Report	Pts: Aidan Nugent 0-7 (3tpf, 1f), Ross McQuillan 1-1, Lewis Bellew 0-2, Tiarnan O'Neill 0-2, Shea Hoey 0-2, Gavan Duffy 0-1, Caolan Reavey 0-1, Kiernan McCooey 0-1	Referee: Neil McGeown

==== Round 2 ====
21 August 2026 Round 2	Silverbridge Harps	1-07 (10) – (21) 1-18	Killeavy St Moninna's	Silverbridge
19:00 IST (UTC+1)		(HT: 0-03 – 1-10)		Venue: Keeley Park
	Pts: Jamie Murphy 1-0, Seán Conlon 0-2, Pauric Keating 0-2 (tp), Tiarnan Murphy 0-1, Conor McArdle 0-1, Tom Hamill 0-1	Report	Pts: Kealan McDonnell 0-4 (2tp), Tiernan Brown 1-0, Niall Magennis 0-3, Kyle Mallon 0-2, Lee Rice 0-2, Caolan McConville 0-2, Callum O'Hare 0-1, Cathal Boylan 0-1, Fergal Boylan 0-1, Ronan McGuinness 0-1	Referee: Jake Magill

23 August 2026 Round 2	St Patrick's	0-21 (21) – (26) 2-20	Clan na Gael	Cullyhanna
16:15 IST (UTC+1)				Venue: Páirc Pádraig
	Pts: Aidan Nugent 0-13 (2tp, 2tpf), Gavan Duffy 0-3 (1tp), Ross McQuillan 0-2, Lewis Bellew 0-1, Phelim Savage 0-1, Caolan Reavey 0-1	Report	Pts: Stefan Campbell 1-10, Shane McPartlan 1-3 (1tp), Matthew Lennon 0-3, Niall Henderson 0-2 (tp), Michael McConville 0-1, Ross Marsden 0-1	Referee: Pádraig Hughes

==== Round 3 ====
29 August 2026 Round 3	Killeavy St Moninna's	1-28 (31) – (19) 1-16	St Patrick's	Killeavy
18:45 IST (UTC+1)		(HT: 1-11 – 0-11)		Venue: Killeavy Memorial Park
	Pts: Fergal Boylan 1-4 (3f), Shea Magill 0-7 (3tpf, 1'45), Callum O'Hare 0-4 (2tp), Ciarán O'Hanlon 0-3, Aron Magennis 0-3, Caolan McConville 0-3, Gareth Murphy 0-1, Euan Boyd 0-1, Niall Magennis 0-1, Tiarnan Brown 0-1	Report	Pts: Aidan Nugent 0-8 (3tpf, 2f), Tony Donnelly 0-5 (2tp), Padraig McCreesh 1-0, Lewis Bellew 0-1, Ross McQuillan 0-1, Caolan Reavey 0-1	Referee: Enda Mallon

29 August 2026 Round 3	Clan na Gael	0-13 (13) – (13) 0-13	Silverbridge Harps	Lurgan
18:45 IST (UTC+1)				Venue: Davitt Park
	Pts: Stefan Campbell 0-11 (2tp), Michael McConville 0-1, James Austin 0-1	Report	Pts: Tiernan Murphy 0-4 (1tp), Tom Hamill 0-2, Michael Traynor 0-1, Jamie Martin 0-1, Pauric Keating 0-1, Chris Connolly 0-1, Gavin Burns 0-1, Jamie Murphy 0-1, Aaron Duffy 0-1	Referee: Oisín McKee

=== Group 3 ===
Advance to quarter-final Advance to preliminary quarter-final Relegated to Intermediate Championship

Team	Pld	W	D	L	F	A	Diff	Pts
Clann Éireann	3	3	0	0	66	39	+27	6
Mullaghbawn	3	2	0	1	54	55	-1	4
Carrickcruppen	3	1	0	2	56	63	-7	2
High Moss Sarsfields	3	0	0	3	40	59	-19	0

==== Round 1 ====
14 August 2026 Round 1	Carrickcruppen	0-13 (13) – (26) 1-23	Clann Éireann	Camlough
19:15 IST (UTC+1)		(HT: 0-06 – 1-13)		Venue: Páirc Naomh Pádraig
	Pts: Blaine Hughes 0-5 (2tpf, 1f), Eoin Woods 0-3 (3f), Eoin Kane 0-2 (tp), Conor Sloan 0-2 (2f), Shea Loughran 0-1	Report	Pts: Conor Turbitt 0-13 (1tpf, 5f), Odhran McCaffrey 1-0, Coden Henderson 0-3 (1tp), Aodhan McConville 0-2 (1m), Emmet Magee 0-1, Redmond French 0-1, Tiernan Kelly 0-1, Daniel Magee 0-1, Rogan McVeigh 0-1	Referee: Conor Byrne

16 August 2026 Round 1	High Moss Sarsfields	3-06 (15) – (16) 0-16	Mullaghbawn	Derrytrasna
16:15 IST (UTC+1)		(HT: 2-04 – 0-09)		Venue: High Moss Sarsfields GFC
	Pts: Tommy McAlinde 2-2, Eamon McGeown 1-2 (1tp), Callum McGibbon 0-1 ('45), Paul McGeown 0-1	Report	Pts: Fergal O'Brien 0-8 (1f), Kieran Grant 0-2 (1f), Martin McKinley 0-2, Eoghan McDonnell 0-2 (tp), Pearse Quinn 0-1, David McKinley 0-1	Referee: Tony O'Hare

==== Round 2 ====
22 August 2026 Round 2	High Moss Sarsfields	0-13 (13) – (20) 0-20	Clann Éireann	Derrytrasna
17:15 IST (UTC+1)		(HT: 0-04 – 0-09)		Venue: High Moss Sarsfields GFC
	Pts: Callum McGibbon 0-5 (2tpf), Paul McGeown 0-5 (5f), Ronan Sloan 0-1, Eamon McGeown 0-1 (f), Michael Stevenson 0-1	Report	Pts: Conor Turbitt 0-5 (3f, 1tp), Ruairí McDonald 0-4 (1f), Dan McCarthy 0-3, Cohen Henderson 0-3, Aodhan McConville 0-2, Redmond French 0-1, Tiernan Kelly 0-1, Daniel Magee 0-1	Referee: Oisín McKee

22 August 2026 Round 2	Mullaghbawn	1-22 (25) – (20) 2-14	Carrickcruppen	Mullaghbawn
19:00 IST (UTC+1)		(HT: 1-10 – 2-09)		Venue: Cúchulainn Park
	Pts: Kieran Grant 1-12 (6f, 3tpf, 1pen), Marty McKinley 0-2 (tp), Fionn Downey 0-2 (tp), David McKinley 0-2, Fergal O'Brien 0-1, Pearse Quinn 0-1, Tiarnan Murphy 0-1, Luke Owens 0-1	Report	Pts: Shea Loughran 2-1, Eoin Kane 0-6 (2tp, 2f), Blaine Hughes 0-3 (1tpf, 1'45), Eoin Woods 0-2 (2f), Conor Sloan 0-2 (2f)	Referee: Enda Mallon

==== Round 3 ====
30 August 2026 Round 3	Carrickcruppen	2-17 (23) – (12) 0-12	High Moss Sarsfields	Camlough
16:15 IST (UTC+1)				Venue: Páirc Naomh Pádraig
	Pts: Jack Cunningham 1-2, Eoin Kane 1-2, Eoin Woods 0-4, Christian Cunningham 0-4 (1tp), Shea Loughran 0-3, Blaine Hughes 0-1, Daithí O'Callaghan 0-1	Report	Pts: Paul McGeown 0-6 (1tp), Conal McCann 0-2 (tp), Stevie McArdle 0-1, Éamonn McGeown 0-1, Colin Stevenson 0-1, Thomas McAlinden 0-1	Referee: Martin Conroy

30 August 2026 Round 3	Clann Éireann	1-17 (20) – (13) 0-13	Mullaghbawn	Lurgan
16:15 IST (UTC+1)		(HT: 1-09 – 0-06)		Venue: Clann Éireann Park
	Pts: Conor Turbitt 1-5 (2f, 1tpf), Cohen Henderson 0-3, Tiernan Kelly 0-2, Conor McConville 0-2, Redmond French 0-1, Dan McCarthy 0-1, Oran McCaffrey 0-1, Ruairí McDonald 0-1, Aodhan McConville 0-1	Report	Pts: Marty McKinley 0-4 (1tp), Pearse Quinn 0-3, Kieran Grant 0-2 (1f, 1'45), Fergal O'Brien 0-1, Cormac Smyth 0-1, Tiernan Murphy 0-1, Eddie English 0-1	Referee: Philip Conway

=== Group 4 ===
Advance to quarter-final Advance to preliminary quarter-final Relegated to Intermediate Championship

Team	Pld	W	D	L	F	A	Diff	Pts
Dromintee	3	2	1	0	65	38	+27	5
Madden Raparees	3	2	1	0	64	47	+17	5
Crossmaglen Rangers	3	1	0	2	58	54	+4	2
Tullysaran	3	0	0	3	38	86	-48	0

==== Round 1 ====
16 August 2026 Round 1	Tullysaran	1-14 (17) – (24) 2-18	Crossmaglen Rangers	Tullysaran
14:00 IST (UTC+1)		(HT: 0-04 – 0-12)		Venue: Tullysaran GAA
	Pts: Gavin Conlon 0-7 (2f, 2tpf), Mark McKeever 0-7 (4f, 1tpf), Eddie Mallon 1-0	Report	Pts: Cian McConville 0-5 (2f, 1tpf), Aaron O'Neill 0-5 (2tpf), Paul Hughes 1-1, Johnny Murtagh 0-4 (1f, 1tp), Stephen Morris 1-0, Aaron Haughey 0-1, Dara O'Callaghan 0-1, Odhran Caraher 0-1	Referee: Denise McDonald

16 August 2026 Round 1	Dromintee	1-12 (15) – (15) 1-12	Madden Raparees	Dromintee
18:30 IST (UTC+1)		(HT: 0-05 – 1-09)		Venue: Dromintee St Patrick's GAC
	Pts: Oran Loughran 0-4 (1f), Cathal McKenna 1-0, Eoghan McKeever 0-3, Jack McArdle 0-2 (1f), Michael O'Neill 0-2, Dylan McGahon Malone 0-1 ('45)	Report	Pts: Conor Grimley 0-5 (1tp, 1f, 1tpf), Paidí Comiskey 1-0, Joe Sheridan 0-3, Niall Smith 0-2, Oisín O'Hara, Ciarán Rafferty 0-1	Referee: Padraig Hughes

==== Round 2 ====
23 August 2026 Round 2	Tullysaran	0-09 (9) – (25) 1-22	Madden Raparees	Tullysaran
16:15 IST (UTC+1)		(HT: 0-02 – 0-11)		Venue: Tullysaran GAA
	Pts: Mark McKeever 0-3 (1tpf), Ronan Mallon 0-2 (1f), Ryan Conlon 0-2, Gavin Conlon 0-1, Barry Toner 0-1	Report	Pts: Joe Sheridan 1-6 (1tp), Niall Grimley 0-3, Darragh McMullen 0-3, Conor Grimley 0-3 (2f), Donal Rafferty 0-2, Ciaran Rafferty 0-2, Shea Vallely 0-1, Peter Lappin 0-1, Niall Smith 0-1	Referee: Damian Toner

23 August 2026 Round 2	Crossmaglen Rangers	0-11 (11) – (13) 1-10	Dromintee	Crossmaglen
18:45 IST (UTC+1)		(HT: 0-06 – 0-05)		Venue: St Oliver Plunkett Park
	Pts: Pearse Blessing 0-2 (tp), Johnny Murtagh 0-2, Odhran Caraher 0-1, Stephen Morris 0-1, Aaron Haughey 0-1, Darron McDonnell 0-1, Cian McConville 0-1, Aaron O'Neill, Padraig Stuttard 0-1	Report	Pts: Shea McArdle 1-0 (pen), Oran Loughran 0-3, Dylan McGahon Malone 0-2 (tpf), Diarmuid O'Rourke 0-2, Fergus Toale 0-1, Keane McArdle 0-1, Cathal McKenna 0-1	Referee: Martin Conroy

==== Round 3 ====
30 August 2026 Round 3	Dromintee	4-25 (37) – (12) 0-12	Tullysaran	Dromintee
18:30 IST (UTC+1)		(HT: 2-10 – 0-05)		Venue: Dromintee St Patrick's GAC
	Pts: Diarmaid O'Rourke 1-8 (1f), Dylan McGahon Malone 0-7 (2tpf, 3f), Jack McArdle 1-1, Fergus Toale 1-1, Cathal McKenna 1-0, Michael O'Neill 0-2, Eoghan McKeever 0-2, Fionn Toale 0-1, Ryan Hughes 0-1, Aaron McKay 0-1, Oran Loughran 0-1	Report	Pts: Mark McKeever 0-5 (2f), Gavin Conlon 0-3 (1f), Ciarán Mullen 0-2 (tp), Aron Donnelly 0-1, Eddie Mallon 0-1	Referee: Tony O'Hare

30 August 2026 Round 3	Madden Raparees	1-21 (24) – (23) 2-17	Crossmaglen Rangers	Milford
18:30 IST (UTC+1)		(HT: 1-12 – 2-03)		Venue: Páirc na Ropairí
	Pts: Conor Grimley 0-12 (3tpf, 2f, 1tp), Joe Sheridan 1-2, Niall Grimley 0-3 (1tp), Ciarán Rafferty 0-2, Darragh McMullen 0-1, Paidí Comiskey 0-1	Report	Pts: Oisín O'Neill 0-5 (2tpf, 1f), Odhran Kieran 1-0, Odhran Caraher 1-0, James Teelan 0-3, Cian McConville 0-2 (tp), Aaron O'Neill 0-2 (tpf), Rian O'Neill 0-2 (tpf), Stephen Morris 0-1, Pearse Blessing 0-1, Johnny Murtagh 0-1	Referee: Conor Byrne

== Knockout Stage ==
The top team in each group progresses to the quarter-finals. The 2nd and 3rd placed teams in each group qualify for the preliminary quarter-finals where 2nd is drawn against 3rd. The winners of the preliminary quarter-finals are drawn against the other four teams. The draw for the preliminary quarter-finals took place on 30 August 2026.

=== Bracket ===
Preliminary round
5 September, Silverbridge
Mullaghbawn	1-18
St Patrick's	2-13
5 September, Mowhan
Maghery Sean MacDermott's	1-22
Carrickcruppen (AET)	1-24
6 September, Armagh
Clan na Gael	0-13
Crossmaglen Rangers	5-27
6 September, Armagh
Madden Raparees	2-22
Granemore	0-10

Quarter-finals
19 September, Armagh
Dromintee	3-14
Mullaghbawn	1-15
20 September, Armagh
Killeavy St Moninna's	3-22
Carrickcruppen	2-07
19 September, Armagh
Culloville Blues	2-12
Crossmaglen Rangers	2-21
20 September, Armagh
Clann Éireann	1-13
Madden Raparees	0-11

Semi-finals
3 October, Armagh
Dromintee	0-08
Killeavy St Moninna's	2-12
4 October, Armagh
Crossmaglen Rangers	0-23
Clann Éireann	1-19

Final
18 October, Armagh
Killeavy St Moninna's	0-17
Crossmaglen Rangers	1-19

=== Preliminary Quarter-Finals ===
5 September 2026 Preliminary Quarter-Final	Mullaghbawn	1-18 (21) – (19) 2-13	St Patrick's	Silverbridge
17:15 IST (UTC+1)		(HT: 1-10 – 0-06)		Venue: Keeley Park
	Pts: Fergal O'Brien 0-8 (1f), Marty McKinley 0-4 (1tp), Cormac Smyth 1-0, Pearse Magill 0-2, Kieran Grant 0-2 (1f), Eoghan McDonnell 0-1, Eddie English 0-1	Report	Pts: Ross McQuillan 1-2 (1tp), Aidan Nugent 0-4 (3f), Padraig McCreesh 1-0, Tony Donnelly 0-3 (1tp), Lewis Bellew 0-1, Tiarnan O'Neill 0-1 ('45), Kieran McCooey 0-1, Caolan Reavey 0-1	Referee: Kevin Faloon

5 September 2026 Preliminary Quarter-Final	Maghery Sean MacDermott's	1-22 (25) – (27) 1-24 (a.e.t.)	Carrickcruppen	Mowhan
19:30 IST (UTC+1)		(HT: 1-07 – 1-09) (FT: 1-19 – 1-19)		Venue: Clady GFC
	Pts: Aidan Forker 0-8 (3f, 1tp), Stephen Cusack 0-6 (3tp), Stefan Forker 0-4 (1tp, 1f), John Mackle 1-0, Brendan Haveron 0-1, Seán Toye 0-1, Padraig O'Keefe 0-1 ('45)	Report	Pts: Eoin Woods 1-10 (6f, 1tp), Eoin Kane 0-6 (2tp), Blaine Hughes 0-2 (tpf), Shea Loughran 0-2, Christian Cunningham 0-2 (tp), Ross Magee 0-1, Daire Kelly 0-1	Referee: Jake Magill

6 September 2026 Preliminary Quarter-Final	Clan na Gael	0-13 (13) – (42) 5-27	Crossmaglen Rangers	Armagh
14:00 IST (UTC+1)		(HT: 0-07 – 4-16)		Venue: Athletic Grounds
	Pts: Stefan Campbell 0-4 (1tp), Ross Marsden 0-3 (1tp), Niall Henderson 0-2 (tpf), James Austin 0-2, Jack Lavery 0-1, Callum O'Neill 0-1	Report	Pts: Cian McConville 2-4 (1tp), Aaron O'Neill 2-2, Oisín O'Neill 0-8 (3tp, 1f), Rian O'Neill 0-5 (1tp), Aaron Haughey 1-0, Christopher Crowley 0-2 (tp), Pearse Blessing 0-2 (tp), Odhran Caraher 0-1, Keelan McEntee 0-1, Dara O'Callaghan 0-1, Finn Cumiskey 0-1	Referee: Neil McGeown

6 September 2026 Preliminary Quarter-Final	Madden Raparees	2-22 (28) – (10) 0-10	Granemore	Armagh
16:00 IST (UTC+1)		(HT: 1-13 – 0-02)		Venue: Athletic Grounds
	Pts: Conor Grimley 1-5 (1tp, 1f), Joe Sheridan 0-5 (2tp), Niall Smith 1-1, Ciarán Rafferty 0-3, Patrick Carr 0-2, Darragh McMullen 0-2, Aron McKenna 0-2, Cathal Maguire 0-1, Paidi Comiskey 0-1	Report	Pts: Peter Carr 0-3 (1tp), Brendan Boylan 0-3 (1tp), Barry Toner 0-2, Kieran Doyle 0-1, Eoghan O'Neill 0-1	Referee: Fearghal Laverty

=== Quarter-Finals ===
The draw for the quarter finals was made on 6 September 2026.

19 September 2026 Quarter-Final	Dromintee	3-14 (23) – (18) 1-15	Mullaghbawn	Armagh
17:00 IST (UTC+1)		(HT: 1-07 – 0-08)		Venue: Athletic Grounds
	Pts: Jack McArdle 1-5, Dylan McGahon-Malone 0-4 (2tpf), Cathal McKenna 1-0, Shea McArdle 1-0, Aaron McKay 0-2 (tp), Diarmuid O'Rourke 0-2, Michael O'Neill 0-1	Report	Pts: Fergal O'Brien 0-5, Joe McCann 1-1, Kieran Grant 0-3 (1tp), Cormac Smyth 0-2, Marty McKinley 0-1, Pearse Quinn 0-1, Gerard McCann 0-1, Eddie English 0-1

19 September 2026 Quarter-Final	Clann Éireann	1-13 (16) – (11) 0-11	Madden Raparees	Armagh
19:00 IST (UTC+1)		(HT: 1-07 – 0-06)		Venue: Athletic Grounds
	Pts: Cohen Henderson 1-1, Odhran McCaffrey 0-4, Conor Turbitt 0-4 (1f), Tiernan Kelly 0-1, Emmet Magee 0-1, Daniel Magee 0-1, Aodhan McConville 0-1	Report	Pts: Conor Grimley 0-3 (3f), Niall Grimley 0-2 (tp), Darragh McMullen 0-2 (tp), Joe Sheridan 0-2, Donal Rafferty 0-1, Ciarán Rafferty 0-1

20 September 2026 Quarter-Final	Killeavy St Moninna's	3-22 (31) – (13) 2-07	Carrickcruppen	Armagh
16:00 IST (UTC+1)		(HT: 2-09 – 2-04)		Venue: Athletic Grounds
	Pts: Fergal Boland 1-7 (2f), Kealan McDonnell 1-3 (1tp), Cathal Boylan 1-1, Shea Magill 0-3 (1tpf, 1f), Gareth Murphy 0-2 (tp), Callum O'Hare 0-2 (tp), Ciarán O'Hanlon 0-2, Niall Magennis 0-1, Aron Magennis 0-1	Report	Pts: Jack Cunningham 1-0, Daire Kelly 1-0, Blaine Hughes 0-3 (1tpf, 1f), Eoin Woods 0-2 (2f), Christian Cunningham 0-1, Eoin Kane 0-1

20 September 2026 Quarter-Final	Culloville Blues	2-12 (18) – (27) 2-21	Crossmaglen Rangers	Armagh
18:00 IST (UTC+1)		(HT: 1-08 – 1-09)		Venue: Athletic Grounds
	Pts: Aaron Garvey 1-1, James King 1-0, Taidgh O'Neill 0-3, Ryan Garvey 0-2, Niall Rowland 0-1, Shane Carragher 0-1, Ryan Duffy 0-1, Eoin Duffy 0-1, Dara Quinn 0-1, Fergal Kieran 0-1	Report	Pts: Oisín O'Neill 2-10 (4f, 1tp, 1tpf), Cian McConville 0-4, Rian O'Neill 0-3 (1'45), Aaron O'Neill 0-2, Stephen Morris 0-1, Pearse Blessing 0-1

=== Semi-Finals ===
3 October 2026 Semi-Final	Killeavy St Moninna's	2-12 (18) – (8) 0-08	Dromintee	Armagh
19:00 IST (UTC+1)		(HT: 2-08 – 0-07)		Venue: Athletic Grounds
	Pts: Fergal Boylan 2-1, Aron Magennis 0-4, Callum O'Hare 0-3 (1tp), Cathal Boylan 0-1, Conor O'Neill 0-1, Ciarán O'Hanlon 0-1, Ronan McGuinness 0-1	Report	Pts: Dylan McGahon Malone 0-5 (2tpf, 1'45), Gareth Kilgallon 0-1, Oran Loughran 0-1, Jack McArdle 0-1

4 October 2026 Semi-Final	Clann Éireann	1-19 (22) – (23) 0-23	Crossmaglen Rangers	Armagh
18:00 IST (UTC+1)		(HT: 1-14 – 0-04)		Venue: Athletic Grounds
	Pts: Conor Turbitt 0-5 (2tp, 1f), Emmet Magee 1-1, Daniel Magee 0-4 (1tp), Ruairí McDonald 0-3 (1tp), Tiernan Kelly 0-2 (tp), Barry McCambridge 0-1, Cohen Henderson 0-1, Dan McCarthy 0-1, Rioghan Meehan 0-1	Report	Pts: Oisín O'Neill 0-10 (2tp, 2tpf, 2f), Aaron O'Neill 0-4 (2tp), Rian O'Neill 0-3 (1tp, 1f), Aaron Haughey 0-2, Pearse Blessing 0-2 (tp), Harry Cumiskey 0-1, Cian McConville 0-1

=== Final ===
Killeavy St Moninna's entered their 8th championship final and their first since 1988. Killeavy were looking to win their first senior title since 1948.

Crossmaglen Rangers played in their first final since 2023 and were playing in their 66th championship final. A win would add a 48th championship to their senior trophy cabinet.

This was Killeavy and Crossmaglen's 3rd final against each; their first since 1924. Both teams had won a game each in those matches.

Crossmaglen were 4/11 favourites, while Killeavy were 5/2 underdogs.

18 October 2026
15:00 IST (UTC+1)
Final

Report

Killeavy St Moninna's	0-17 (17) – (22) 1-19	Crossmaglen Rangers
(HT: 0-08 – 0-10)
Pts: Shea Magill 0-4 (2tpf), Fergal Boylan 0-4 (2tp), Ciarán O'Hanlon 0-3 (1tp), Callum O'Hare 0-2 (tp), Gareth Murphy 0-1, Conor O'Neill 0-1, Aaron Magennis 0-1, Cathal Boylan 0-1		Pts: Pearse Blessing 1-4 (2tp), Oisín O'Neill 0-6 (1tp, 2f), Cian McConville 0-3 (1f), Aaron O'Neill 0-2 (1f), Keelan McEntee 0-2, Harry Cumiskey 0-1, Odhran Caraher 0-1

Athletic Grounds, Armagh

Killeavy St Moninna's	Crossmaglen Rangers
