= Connaire Mackin =

Armagh Gaelic footballer

Personal information
- Native name: Connaire Ó Maicín (Irish)

Sport
- Sport: Gaelic Football
Club
- Years: Club
- Shane O'Neill's GAC
Inter-county
- Years: County
- Armagh
Inter-county titles
- Ulster titles: 1 (2026)
- All-Irelands: 1 (2024)

Connaire Mackin is a Gaelic footballer from Camlough, Co. Armagh, who plays at senior level for the Armagh county team. He was given a red card and banned for a Category 3 offence in 2024. This came about after Mackin jabbed his foot at the head of an opponent, Conor Glass, during a game, in an action that was described as "both deliberate and cynical". Glass was lying on the ground at the time. Mackin's attempt to overturn the ban did not succeed. Mackin started for Armagh in the 2024 All-Ireland Senior Football Championship final, which saw them win for the second time in the county's history.
