= O'Connell's GAC, Tullysaran =

Armagh-based Gaelic games club

Tullysaran O'Connell's GAC
- Tulach Saráin
- Founded: 1889
- County: Armagh
- Colours: Red and white

Playing kits
Standard colours

O'Connell's GAC, Tullysaran (Irish: Tulach Saráin) is a Gaelic Athletic Association club in County Armagh, Northern Ireland. It is part of Armagh GAA, and is based in the rural district of Tullysaran.

The club's senior teams currently play Gaelic football in the Armagh Intermediate Championship and Division 2 of the All-County Leagues. It has several under-age football teams, and provides for Ladies' Gaelic football and camogie.

== History ==
Tullysaran O'Connell's was one of the nine clubs represented at the first recorded meeting of Armagh County Board on 30 March 1889. The Armagh Guardian of 20 May 1904 records a match being played at Kilmatroy near Tullysaran, but the club's own records date back only to 1932, referring not to the present name but to Knappagh O'Connell's or the Sons of O'Connor, Knappagh. In the late 1930s the parish league included a White Arrows team from Maydown, and other teams from Milltown/Aughatarra, Ballymacully and Knappagh.

The O'Connell's name re-emerged around 1947.

== Gaelic football ==
=== Honours ===
- Armagh Intermediate Football League A
  - 2025
- Armagh Intermediate Football League B
  - 2019
- Armagh Intermediate Football Championship
  - Runner-Up 2016
- Armagh Junior Football Championship
  - 2015 Runner-up 1957, 2010
- Armagh Junior Football League
  - 1957
- Trodden Cup
  - 1957

== Camogie ==
- Ulster Junior Camogie Championship
  - 2016
- Ulster Junior B Camogie Championship
  - 2026
- Armagh Intermediate Camogie Championship
  - 2026

== Facilities ==
In the 1930s the games were played at Trainor's field at Knappagh crossroads. In 1970 the field behind the chapel was rented from the parish and Fr Clarke donated an asbestos bungalow as changing rooms. Major Terris donated goalposts and the club was going strong once more. In 1971 the clubrooms were destroyed in an explosion. New club rooms were later erected and remained until the 1990s.
