= Paddy Burns (Gaelic footballer) =

Armagh Gaelic footballer

Personal information
- Native name: Pádraig Ó Broin (Irish)
- Nickname: Bamber
- Born: 17th Feb, 1993 Newry
- Occupation: Actuary
- Height: 5 ft 11 in (180 cm)

Sport
- Sport: Gaelic Football
- Position: Right Corner Back
Club
- Years: Club
- Burren
College
- Years: College
- 2012 Freshers 'A' All Ireland
Inter-county
- Years: County
- 2018–: Armagh
Inter-county titles
- All-Irelands: 2024 Winner
- All Stars: 2024 Nominee

Paddy Burns is a Gaelic footballer who plays at senior level for the Armagh county team. Burns, a corner-back, was injured for the 2023 Ulster Senior Football Championship final, in the year his uncle Jarlath, who also played for Armagh, was elected GAA President. Jarlath's son Jarly Óg, a cousin of Paddy Burns, has also played for Armagh alongside Paddy Burns. Burns father, Fintan also represented Armagh at Senior Level in the late 80s and early 90s.

Burns played for Armagh from U15 right up to Minor and featured in an Ulster Minor Final where Armagh were defeated by Cavan in 2011 only to suffer a further defeat in the AI QF at the hands of Roscommon. He also represented Ulster at U16 Provincial level.

Burns attended QUB Belfast where he studied Actuarial Science. He won an All Ireland Freshers medal with QUB and featured on their Sigerson Cup panel throughout his time at the University.

Burns previously represented Dundalk Schoolboys at the Milk Cup having been selected to play at Centre Back following a successful season with Fatima Shamrocks FC. This was under the stewardship of mentors Brian Bird and 'Tubby'.
