= Joe McElroy =

Armagh Gaelic footballer

Sport
Club
- Years: Club
- Armagh Harps
Club titles
- titles: 1
Inter-county
- Years: County
- Armagh

Joe McElroy is a Gaelic footballer who plays for the Armagh Harps club and at senior level for the Armagh county team. He played against Kerry in the 2024 All-Ireland Senior Football Championship Semi-Final, helping to send his team through to a first final for 21 years.

McElroy performed a crucial block against an attempt by Galway player Paul Conroy to level the 2024 All-Ireland Senior Football Championship final in the seventh minute of injury-time. This proved critical to Armagh's eventual one-point victory, as otherwise the game would have gone to extra-time.
