= Ulster Championship =

Ulster Championship may refer to a number of Gaelic games competitions in Ulster:

- Inter-county Gaelic football competitions:
  - Ulster Senior Football Championship
  - Ulster Under-21 Football Championship
  - Ulster Minor Football Championship
  - Ulster Junior Football Championship
- Club Gaelic football competitions:
  - Ulster Senior Club Football Championship
  - Ulster Intermediate Club Football Championship
  - Ulster Junior Club Football Championship
  - Ulster Minor Club Football Championship
- Inter-county hurling competitions:
  - Ulster Senior Hurling Championship
  - Ulster Under-21 Hurling Championship
  - Ulster Minor Hurling Championship
  - Ulster Intermediate Hurling Championship
  - Ulster Junior Hurling Championship
- Club hurling competitions:
  - Ulster Senior Club Hurling Championship
  - Ulster Intermediate Club Hurling Championship
  - Ulster Junior Club Hurling Championship
  - Ulster Minor Club Hurling Championship

== See also ==
- Ulster GAA
