= 2009 All-Ireland Minor Football Championship =

Gaelic football competition

All-Ireland Minor Football Championship 2009
Championship details
- Dates: 15 April 2009 – 20 September 2009
- Teams: 32

All-Ireland Champions
- Winning team: Armagh (2nd win)
- Captain: Declan McKenna
- Manager: Paul McShane

All-Ireland Finalists
- Losing team: Mayo
- Captain: Aidan Walsh
- Manager: Ray Dempsey

Provincial Champions
- Munster: Kerry
- Leinster: Dublin
- Ulster: Armagh
- Connacht: Mayo

Championship statistics

The 2009 All-Ireland Minor Football Championship was the 78th staging of the All-Ireland Minor Football Championship, the Gaelic Athletic Association's premier inter-county Gaelic football tournament for boys under the age of 18.

Tyrone entered the championship as defending champions, however, they were defeated by Armagh in the Ulster quarter-final.

On 20 September 2009, Armagh won the championship following a 0-10 to 0-7 defeat of Mayo in the All-Ireland final. This was their second All-Ireland title overall and their first in sixty championship seasons.

== Results ==
=== Connacht Minor Football Championship ===
Quarter-final

| 16 May 2009 Quarter-final | Galway | 1-05 - 0-07 | Sligo | St. Jarlath's Park, Tuam |

Semi-finals

| 28 June 2009 Semi-final | Roscommon | 1-17 - 0-03 | Leitrim | Dr. Hyde Park, Roscommon |

| 28 June 2009 Semi-final | Mayo | 2-13 - 1-07 | Galway | Markievicz Park, Sligo |

Finals

| 19 July 2009 Final | Mayo | 1-05 - 0-08 | Roscommon | Pearse Stadium, Galway |

| 26 July 2009 Final | Roscommon | 0-05 - 1-08 | Mayo | Dr. Hyde Park, Roscommon |

=== Leinster Minor Football Championship ===
First round

| 18 April 2009 First round | Dublin | 4-15 - 0-5 | Louth | Drogheda Park, Drogheda |

| 18 April 2009 First round | Longford | 1-13 - 3-10 | Laois | Pearse Park, Longford |

| 18 April 2009 First round | Carlow | 1-06 - 1-15 | Westmeath | Dr. Cullen Park, Carlow |

| 18 April 2009 First round | Meath | 0-18 - 1-11 | Offaly | Páirc Tailteann, Navan |

| 18 April 2009 First round | Kilkenny | 0-05 - 3-19 | Wexford | Nowlan Park, Kilkenny |

| 18 April 2009 First round | Wicklow | 0-05 - 4-19 | Kildare | Aughrim County Ground, Aughrim |

Second round

| 25 April 2009 Second round | Wicklow | 2-12 - 1-08 | Carlow | Aughrim County Ground, Aughrim |

| 25 April 2009 Second round | Longford | 1-06 - 4-12 | Offaly | Pearse Park, Longford |

Third round

| 10 May 2009 Third round | Offaly | 1-15 - 0-16 | Louth | O'Connor Park, Tullamore |

| 10 May 2009 Third round | Wicklow | 8-15 - 1-01 | Kilkenny | Aughrim County Ground, Aughrim |

Quarter-finals

| 23 May 2009 Quarter-final | Meath | 0-18 - 0-9 | Westmeath | Páirc Tailteann, Navan |
| | D Carroll (0-4), C Devereaux (0-3), P McKeever (0-3), L Tolan (0-2), E Boyle (0-2); M O'Sullivan (0-1); S Tobin (0-1, free), H Silke (0-1), D Larkin (0-1). | | E Gorman (0-3), J Heslin (0-2); W Fox (0-1); G Egan (0-1), K Reilly (0-1), R Kenny (0-1). | Referee: F Barry (Kildare) |

| 23 May 2009 Quarter-final | Kildare | 3-13 - 2-04 | Wexford | St. Conleth's Park, Newbridge |
| | | | | Referee: F Kelly (Longford) |

| 23 May 2009 Quarter-final | Offaly | 3-13 - 2-11 | Wicklow | O'Connor Park, Tullamore |

| 23 May 2009 Quarter-final | Dublin | 0-14 - 1-10 (aet) | Laois | Parnell Park, Dublin |

Semi-finals

| 27 June 2009 Semi-final | Meath | 0-10 - 1-08 | Kildare | Páirc Tailteann, Navan |
| | S Tobin (0-4, 1f, 1'45), M Sullivan (0-2), H Silke (0-1), P McKeever (0-1), E Boyle (0-1), A Mahon (0-1). | | D Mulhall (1-5, 2f), C Reynolds (0-1), P Cribben (0-1), P Fogarty (0-1, 1f). |

| 27 June 2009 Semi-final | Offaly | 1-15 - 5-17 (aet) | Dublin | O'Connor Park, Tullamore |
| | B Allen (1f), D Scanlon (3f) 0-4 each, A Sullivan 1-1, M Young 0-3, N Graham, C Boland, J Crombie 0-1 each. | | P Hudson 2-7 (2f), D Stapleton 1-6, C Reddin, G Sweeney 1-0 each, P Ryan 0-2, M Concarr, F Duffy 0-1 each. | Referee: E Kinsella (Laois) |

Finals

| 12 July 2009 Final | Dublin | 1-10 - 1-10 | Kildare | Croke Park, Dublin |
| | C Carr (1-1); G Sweeney (0-3), P Hudson (0-2, 2f), D Stapleton (0-2, 1f), P Ryan (0-1), A Carr (0-1). | | P Fogarty (1-4, 2f), D Mulhall (0-4, 1 '45, 1f), T Moolick (0-2). | Referee: E Kinsella (Laois) |

| 18 July 2009 Final replay | Dublin | 1-15 - 1-10 | Kildare | Dr. Cullen Park, Carlow |
| | P Hudson (1-4, 2f), G Sweeney (0-5), F Duffy (0-2), C Carr (0-1), G Seaver (0-1), D Stapleton (0-1), F Breathnach (0-1), | | D Mulhall (1-1), P Cribbin (0-4), C Reynolds (0-3), S Hurley (0-2). | Referee: P Kneel (Louth) |

=== Munster Minor Football Championship ===
Quarter-finals

| 15 April 2009 Quarter-final | Waterford | 1-05 - 1-15 | Clare | Fraher Field, Dungarvan |
| | K Moore 1-1, B O’Halloran 0-2, B Nolan and P Whyte 0-1 each. |

| 15 April 2009 Quarter-final | Tipperary | 1-06 - 1-11 | Kerry | Semple Stadium, Thurles |
| | J McMahon 1-1, L Treacy 0-3, R McGrath 0-1, Billy Hewitt 0-1. | | E O’Connor 1-5, D O’Sullivan 0-3, N O’Shea 0-2, S Carroll 0-1. | Referee: R Moloney (Limerick) |

| 15 April 2009 Quarter-final | Cork | 2-12 - 1-06 | Limerick | Páirc Uí Rinn, Cork |
| | D Fitzgerald 1-6 (1f); J Dineen 0-4; B Hurley 1-0; D Drake, W O’Mahony, 0-1 each. | | P Donna 1-34 (1-0 pen, 3f); J Kelly, T Quilligan, M Ranahan (f), 0-1 each. | Referee: J Brew (Clare) |

Play-offs

| 20 April 2009 Play-off | Waterford | 0-09 - 0-06 | Limerick | Fraher Field, Dungarvan |
| | B O'Halloran 0-8, M O'Halloran 0-1. | | J Mulcahy 0-4; C Beehan 0-1, T Quilligan 0-1. |

| 20 April 2009 Play-off | Tipperary | 1-15 - 0-06 | Waterford | Semple Stadium, Thurles |
| | J McMahon (0-6, 5f), B Hewitt (1-1), R Peters (0-3, 2f); R McGrath (0-2), T Hill (0-1), J Lonergan (0-1), L Treacy (0-1). | | P Whyte (0-4, 2 45s, 1f), S Lawless (0-1), B O’Halloran (0-1). | Referee: C Lane (Cork) |

Semi-finals

| 13 May 2009 Semi-final | Kerry | 2-10 - 1-04 | Clare | Austin Stack Park, Tralee |
| | E O’Connor 1-2, D O’Sullivan 0-2, S Carroll 0-2, J Sherwood 0-1, M Brennan 0-1; N O’Shea 0-1, M Reen 0-1. | | C Ryan 1-0, S Malone 1-0 (og), C McInerney 0-3, D Sexton 0-1. | Referee: D O'Mahony (Tipperary) |

| 13 May 2009 Semi-final | Cork | 0-10 - 0-13 (aet) | Tipperary | Páirc Uí Rinn, Cork |
| | J Dineen, B Hurley 0-2 each, D Brosnan, A Cronin, D Drake (0-1′45), D Fitzgerald (0-1f), S Finn, G Minihane 0-1 each. | | B Hewitt (0-2f), R Peters (0-1f, 0-1 ‘45), R McGrath (0-1f) 0-3 each, L Treacy, L Murphy, T Hill, J McMahon 0-1 each. | Attendance: M Rock (Clare) |

Final

| 5 July 2009 Final | Kerry | 0-12 - 0-06 | Tipperary | Páirc Uí Chaoimh, Cork |
| | J Sherwood (0-4), E O'Connor (0-3, 3f), D O'Sullivan (0-1); N O'Shea (0-1), S Carroll (0-1), I Galvin (0-1), D Kelly (0-1). | | J McMahon (0-2), T Hill (0-1), R Peters (0-1); L Treacy (0-1), B Hewitt (0-1, 1f). | Referee: M Rock (Clare) |

=== Ulster Minor Football Championship ===
Preliminary round

| 17 May 2009 Preliminary round | Fermanagh | 0-04 - 1-12 | Down | Brewster Park, Enniskillen |
| | | | | Referee: E McHugh (Tyrone) |

Quarter-finals

| 24 May 2009 Quarter-final | Derry | 0-10 - 1-12 | Monaghan | Celtic Park, Derry |

| 30 May 2009 Quarter-final | Down | 1-11 - 2-07 | Cavan | Athletic Grounds, Armagh |

| 31 May 2009 Quarter-final | Armagh | 2-08 - 1-09 | Tyrone | St. Tiernach's Park, Clones |

| 14 June 2009 Quarter-final | Donegal | 0-14 - 0-11 | Antrim | MacCumhaill Park, Ballybofey |

Semi-finals

| 28 June 2009 Semi-final | Down | 1-10 - 1-08 | Donegal | St. Tiernach's Park, Clones |

| 4 July 2009 Semi-final | Monaghan | 2-08 - 2-14 | Armagh | St. Tiernach's Park, Clones |

Final

| 19 July 2009 Final | Armagh | 1-08 - 1-05 | Down | St. Tiernach's Park, Clones |

=== All-Ireland Minor Football Championship ===
Quarter-finals

| 1 August 2009 Quarter-final | Armagh | 2-14 - 2-08 | Kildare | Kingspan Breffni Park, Cavan |
| | E McVerry (0-7, 2f), G McParland (1-0), R Grugan (0-3, 2f), N Rowland (0-1), J Morgan (0-1); A Murnin (0-1), C King (0-1). | | D Mulhall (1-2, 2f), T Moolick (1-0 og), K Fitzpatrick (1-0), P Cribbin (0-2), C Reynolds (0-2), S Hurley (0-1); P Fogarty (0-1). | Referee: G Walsh (Antrim) |

| 3 August 2009 Quarter-final | Mayo | 3-10 - 1-08 | Tipperary | O'Connor Park, Tullamore |
| | C O'Connor (1-1), A Corduff (1-1), D Coen (1-0), A Farrell (0-2), C Charlton (0-2), A Walsh (0-1); J McDonnell (0-1), D Herbert (0-1), B Walsh (0-1). | | B Hewitt (0-4, 4f), J McMahon (0-4, 4f), E Hendrick (1-0). | Referee: E Kinsella (Laois) |

| 3 August 2009 Quarter-final | Kerry | 3-15 - 1-17 (aet) | Roscommon | Croke Park, Dublin |
| | M Reen (1-1), K Hurley (1-1), N O'Shea (1-1, 1pen), E O'Connor (0-4, 2f), D O'Sullivan (0-2), P Joy (0-1), J O'Sullivan (0-1), I Galvin (0-1), D Kelly (0-1), S Carroll (0-1), G Gibson (0-1). | | C Shine (1-1), N Kilroy (0-4), D Qualter (0-3, 1f), D Clabby (0-2), C Murtagh (0-2), B Carthy (0-1), A Feehily (0-1, 1f), S Oates (0-1), C Compton (0-1), S Leydon (0-1). |

| 15 August 2009 Quarter-final | Dublin | 2-14 - 2-16 | Down | Kingspan Breffni Park, Cavan |
| | D Stapleton (1-10, 5f); P Ryan (1-0), P Hudson (0-2), F Walsh (0-1), G Sweeney (0-1). | | R McGarry (1-3, 2f), N McParland (1-0); C Clarke (0-3, 2f), C Mooney (0-3); M Bagnall (0-2), D McKibben (0-1), R White (0-1), D O'Hanlan (0-1); K McClorey (0-1), R O'Hare (0-1). |

Semi-finals

| 23 August 2009 Semi-final | Armagh | 2-10 - 0-10 | Kerry | Croke Park, Dublin |
| | G McParland (2-0), R Grugan (0-6, 3f), E McVerry (0-3), R Tasker (0-1). | | É O'Connor (0-6, 6f), G Gibson (0-1), J Sherwood (0-1), N O'Shea (0-1), K Hurley (0-1). | Referee: M Duffy (Sligo) |

| 30 August 2009 Semi-final | Mayo | 2-09 - 0-09 | Down | Croke Park, Dublin |
| | C O'Connor (2-0), A Walsh (0-6, 6f), D Coen (0-1), J Carney (0-1), A Corduff (0-1). | | R McGarry (0-5, 2f, one '45), C Mooney (0-3), F McEvoy (0-1). | Referee: B O'Shea (Dublin) |

Final

| 20 September 2009 Final | Armagh | 0-10 - 0-7 | Mayo | Croke Park, Dublin |
| | R Tasker (0-3), E McVerry (0-3, 2f), R Grugan (0-1, 1f), A Murnin (0-1), P Carragher (0-1), T McAlinden (0-1). | Report | B Ruttledge (0-2, 1f), F Durkan (0-1), C Charlton (0-1), D Kirby (0-1), A Walsh (0-1, 1f), C O'Connor (0-1). | Referee: E Kinsella (Laois) |
