= Robert Finnerty =

Galway Gaelic footballer

Rob Finnerty
Personal information
- Native name: Roibeard Ó Fiannachta (Irish)
- Born: 14 April 1998 (age 28) Galway, Ireland
- Occupation: Primary school teacher
- Height: 1.85 m (6 ft 1 in)

Sport
- Sport: Gaelic Football
- Position: Right corner forward
Club
- Years: Club
- 2016–: Salthill–Knocknacarra
College
- Years: College
- NUI Galway
Inter-county
- Years: County
- 2019–: Galway
Inter-county titles
- Connacht titles: 3

Robert Finnerty (born 14 April 1998) is a Gaelic footballer who plays for Salthill–Knocknacarra and at senior level for the Galway county team.

Part of the Galway senior panel since 2017, he played for Galway in the 2016 All-Ireland Minor Football Championship final and the 2017 All-Ireland Under-21 Football Championship final. He has played Sigerson Cup football for NUI Galway and is the son of Anthony Finnerty, who played for Mayo.

Robert Finnerty made senior championship appearances for Galway in 2019, playing championship before he played in the league.

He scored a goal in Pádraic Joyce's first game as manager.

He took a penalty against Armagh in the 2022 All-Ireland SFC quarter-final game.

He came off injured after ten minutes of the 2024 All-Ireland Senior Football Championship final. He won an All Star at the end of the 2024 season.

== Honours ==
Galway

- Connacht Senior Football Championship (3): 2022, 2023, 2024

Individual

- All Star (1): 2024
