= Stefan Campbell =

Armagh Gaelic footballer

Personal information
- Nickname: Soupy
- Born: 1990 or 1991

Sport
Club
- Years: Club
- Clan na Gael
Inter-county
- Years: County
- 2010–2025: Armagh

Stefan Campbell (born 1990 or 1991) is a Gaelic footballer who has played for the Clan na Gael club and at senior level for the Armagh county team. He came on as a substitute in the 2024 All-Ireland Senior Football Championship final and, almost immediately, set up Aaron McKay for the game's only goal. He retired from inter-county football in 2025.

He has also played soccer for his local club, Lurgan Celtic FC. He reportedly re-signed with the club after Armagh were knocked out of the 2025 All-Ireland Senior Football Championship.
