= Ross McQuillan =

Ross McQuillan is an Ulster-born shooter and has won the Irish Open twice. He was also on the GB Palma Team that won the World Long Range Championships in Canada in 2007, with the second highest score on that team. He is now Irish Short Range Captain, effective 2010.
