= Mark Curran (Gaelic footballer) =

Irish Gaelic footballer

Mark Curran is a Gaelic footballer playing for Donegal. He won an Ulster title in his second season playing for them in 2024. After this he scored his first Senior Championship Point against Clare. He is a past Under 20 player.

== Honours ==
Donegal

- Ulster Senior Football Championship: 2024
- National Football League Division 2: 2024
