= Ross McQuillan (Gaelic footballer) =

Armagh Gaelic footballer

Personal information
- Born: 1999/2000

Sport
Club
- Years: Club
- Cullyhanna
Inter-county
- Years: County
- Armagh

Ross McQuillan (born 1999/2000) is a Gaelic footballer who plays for the Cullyhanna club and at senior level for the Armagh county team.

McQuillan scored a point against Kerry in the 2024 All-Ireland Senior Football Championship Semi-Final, to help send his team through to a first final for 21 years.

McQuillan went to the AFL at one point.
