= Rory Grugan =

Armagh Gaelic footballer (born 1991)

Personal information
- Born: 1991 (age 34–35)

Sport
- Sport: Football
Club
- Years: Club
- Ballymacnab
Inter-county*
Years	County	Apps (scores)
2011 - 2026	Armagh	50 (6-102)
- *Inter County team apps and scores correct as of match played 28 July 2024.

Rory Grugan (born 1991) was a Gaelic footballer who plays at senior level for the Armagh county team.

Grugan was a key member of Paul McShane’s 2009 All-Ireland Minor Football Championship winning Armagh team, scoring a point in the final defeat of Mayo.

In 2025, Grugan became the first inter-county player to coach in clubs and schools across France for a Gaelic Games Europe project in partnership with the Gaelic Players Association.

== Career statistics ==
As of match played 28 July 2024

Team	Year	National League			Ulster		All-Ireland		Total	
Team	Year	Division	Apps	Score	Apps	Score	Apps	Score	Apps	Score
Armagh	2011				0	0-00	0	0-00	0	0-00
Armagh	2012				0	0-00	0	0-00	0	0-00
Armagh	2013				0	0-00	1	0-00	1	0-00
Armagh	2014				2	0-01	4	0-02	6	0-03
Armagh	2015				******** DNP *******					
Armagh	2016				1	0-00	1	1-02	2	1-02
Armagh	2017				1	0-00	5	0-15	6	0-15
Armagh	2018				1	0-03	4	2-21	5	2-24
Armagh	2019				3	0-01	2	0-03	5	0-04
Armagh	2020				2	0-03	-		2	0-03
Armagh	2021				2	1-05	-		2	1-05
Armagh	2022				1	0-05	3	2-07	4	2-12
Armagh	2023				4	0-07	4	0-13	8	0-20
Armagh	2024				3	0-07	6	0-07	9	0-14
Career total					20	1-32	30	5-70	50	6-102
