= Blaine Hughes =

Armagh Gaelic footballer

Personal information
- Born: 1995/1996

Sport
- Position: Goalkeeper
Club
- Years: Club
- Carrickcruppen
Inter-county
- Years: County
- 2017–: Armagh

Blaine Hughes (born 1995/1996) is a Gaelic footballer who plays for the Carrickcruppen club and at senior level for the Armagh county team.

Hughes made his senior championship debut in 2017, then established himself as first choice goalkeeper. He played in the opening three matches of 2022 National League, but lost his place in the team after that.

He was given a one-match penalty for "behaving dangerously towards an opponent" during the 2022 All-Ireland SFC quarter-final against Galway, even though he did not play during the game.

In late-2022, Hughes opted out of inter-county football to focus on the business he co-owns, H&G Performance. Hughes returned at the start of 2024 after an injury to Ethan Rafferty.
