= Ben Crealey =

Armagh Gaelic footballer

Sport
Club
- Years: Club
- Maghery
Inter-county
- Years: County
- Armagh

Ben Crealey is a Gaelic footballer who plays for the Maghery club and at senior level for the Armagh county team.

He played against Kerry in the 2024 All-Ireland Senior Football Championship semi-final, helping to send his team through to a first final for 21 years.

A midfielder, Crealey is also a former rally driver. His father was a rally driver too. After winning the 2024 All-Ireland Senior Football Championship final, Crealey described rallying as his "family sport".

At the end of the game, he was reunited with his girlfriend Aoife Reynolds for the first time since she had left for Australia nine months previously. He won an All Star at the end of the 2024 season.

Crealey is a first cousin of Bláithín Bogue, a rookie signing in the 2023 AFL Women's draft.

== Honours ==
Armagh

- All-Ireland Senior Football Championship (1): 2024

Individual

- All Star (1): 2024
