= Peter McGrane =

Armagh Gaelic footballer

Sport
Inter-county
- Years: County
- Armagh

Peter McGrane is a Gaelic footballer who plays at senior level for the Armagh county team.

McGrane scored a point against Kerry in the 2024 All-Ireland Senior Football Championship Semi-Final, to help send his team through to a first final for 21 years. He also took a yellow card after fouling Paul Geaney in that game. A corner-back, he had earlier in the year scored his first inter-county goal in a 2–21 to 0–12 rout of Cavan.
