= Aaron McKay =

Armagh Gaelic footballer

Sport
- Sport: Gaelic Footballer
- Position: Full Back
Inter-county
- Years: County
- Armagh

Aaron McKay is a Gaelic footballer who plays at senior level for the Armagh county team. He is a defender and full-back.

He scored the goal in the 2024 All-Ireland Senior Football Championship final. It was rare, McKay scoring a goal.
