= Niall Grimley =

Armagh Gaelic footballer

Niall Grimley is an Irish Gaelic footballer who plays at senior level for the Armagh county team.

On 25 October 2017, Grimley was named in the Ireland squad for the 2017 International Rules Series against Australia in November.

He dedicated Armagh's victory in the 2024 All-Ireland Senior Football Championship final to his brother, who had died in a road accident less than a year before.
