= Liam Silke =

Irish Gaelic footballer (born 1994)

Personal information
- Native name: Liam Ó Sioda (Irish)
- Born: 22 November 1994 (age 31) Galway, Ireland
- Height: 1.828 m (6 ft 0 in)

Sport
- Sport: Gaelic football
- Position: Right corner-back
Club
- Years: Club
- 2013–: Corofin
Club titles
- Galway titles: 5
- Connacht titles: 3
- All-Ireland Titles: 3
Inter-county
- Years: County
- 2015–: Galway
Inter-county titles
- Connacht titles: 3
- NFL: 1 (Div.2)
- All Stars: 1

Liam Silke (born 22 November 1994) is an Irish Gaelic footballer who plays at senior level for the Galway county team. He is a nephew of All-Ireland SFC winning Galway captain Ray Silke. Silke plays his club football for Corofin.

Silke is an All-Ireland Senior Club Football Championship winner, having been part of the Corofin team that beat Slaughtneil in the 2015 Final.

Silke made his senior championship debut for Galway against New York in the 2015 Connacht Senior Football Championship, starting that game. He was part of the team that won the 2016 Connacht Championship, the county's first provincial title since 2008.

== Honours ==
Individual

- All Star (1): 2022
