= Jason Duffy =

Armagh Gaelic footballer

Personal information
- Born: 1998 (age 27–28)

Sport
Club
- Years: Club
- Cullyhanna
Inter-county
- Years: County
- Armagh

Jason Duffy is a Gaelic footballer who plays for the Cullyhanna club and at senior level for the Armagh county team. He is an Armagh Intermediate Football Championship, Ulster Intermediate Club Football Championship and All-Ireland Intermediate Club Football Championship winner.
