= Andrew Murnin =

Armagh Gaelic footballer

Sport
Club
- Years: Club
- St Paul's
Inter-county
- Years: County
- Armagh

Andrew Murnin is a Gaelic footballer who plays for the St Paul's club and at senior level for the Armagh county team. He plays in the attack, as a utility forward. Murnin was man of the match in the 2009 All-Ireland Minor Football Championship final win over Mayo, Armagh's first title since 1949. He scored the decisive goal to help Armagh to the 2018 Division Three title. His grandfather Andy played as a defender for Down in the 1946 All-Ireland Junior Football Championship final against Warwickshire.
