= Jarly Óg Burns =

Armagh Gaelic footballer

Personal information
- Born: 1998–1999

Sport
Club
- Years: Club
- Silverbridge
Inter-county
- Years: County
- Armagh

Jarlath "Jarly" Óg Burns (born 1998–1999) is a Gaelic footballer who plays for the Silverbridge club and at senior level for the Armagh county team. He is the son of Jarlath Burns, the former Armagh captain who was elected GAA President in 2023.
