= Oisín Conaty =

Irish Gaelic footballer

Personal information
- Born: 17 February 2003 (age 23) Portadown, County Armagh, Northern Ireland

Sport
Club
- Years: Club
- Tír na n-Óg
Inter-county
- Years: County
- Armagh

Oisín Conaty (born 17 February 2003) is a Gaelic footballer who plays at senior level for the Armagh county team. He also played soccer at a juvenile level. In Gaelic football, Conaty was presented with the Man of the Match trophy after the 2024 All-Ireland Senior Football Championship final. He had only joined the Armagh panel as a substitute the year before. His club team is Tír na nÓg, Portadown.

== Honours ==
Armagh

- All-Ireland Senior Football Championship (1): 2024

Individual

- All Star (1): 2024, 2025
- GAA/GPA Young Footballer of the Year (1): 2024 (2025 - Runner Up)
- Irish News Ulster All Star (1): 2024
- Irish News Ulster Rising Star Award (1): 2024
- All-Ireland Football Championship Final Man of the Match (1): 2024
