= Paul Conroy (Gaelic footballer) =

Irish Gaelic footballer

Personal information
- Born: 22 May 1989 (age 37) Galway, Ireland
- Occupation: Secondary school teacher
- Height: 1.9 m (6 ft 3 in)

Sport
- Sport: Gaelic football
- Position: Midfield
Club
- Years: Club
- 2006–: St James'
Club titles
- Galway titles: 1
- Connacht titles: 1
Inter-county*
Years	County	Apps (scores)
2008–2026	Galway	64 (4-93)
Inter-county titles
- Connacht titles: 7
- NFL: 1
- All Stars: 1
- *Inter County team apps and scores correct as of match played 28 July 2024.

Paul Conroy (born 22 May 1989) is an Irish Gaelic footballer who previously played at senior level for the Galway county team and works as a teacher. Conroy was captain of the All-Ireland winning Minor team in 2007 when they narrowly defeated Derry. Conroy made his Senior championship debut against Roscommon and finished the game with a tally of 0–6.

== Career ==
Conroy won an Galway Intermediate Club Championship with St James' in 2010 and followed that up with a Connacht title.

He played twice for Ireland against Australia in the 2013 International Rules Series.

Conroy was named as Galway captain for the 2014 season.

He is an Irish and business teacher at Coláiste Bhaile Chláir in Claregalway. His teammate Damien Comer also teaches in the school. The Irish language has been an integral part of Conroy's life as his parents hail from the Connemara Gaeltacht. In March 2022, Conroy was announced as the GAA's Irish language ambassador for 2022 at an event in Croke Park.

Conroy won an All Star and was selected as GAA/GPA Footballer of the Year at the end of the 2024 season.

In November 2026, Conroy announced his retirement from inter-county football.

== Career statistics ==
As of match played 28 July 2024

Team	Year	National League			Connacht		All-Ireland		Total	
Team	Year	Division	Apps	Score	Apps	Score	Apps	Score	Apps	Score
Galway	2008	Division 1			3	0-07	1	0-00	4	0-07
Galway	2009	Division 1			1(?)	0-00	1	0-02	2	0-02
Galway	2010	Division 1			2	0-01	1	0-00	3	0-01
Galway	2011	Division 1			1	1-00	1	0-00	2	1-00
Galway	2012	Division 1			2	1-07	1	0-01	3	1-08
Galway	2013	Division 1			1	0-01	4	0-08	5	0-09
Galway	2014	Division 1			2	0-04	2	0-04	4	0-08
Galway	2015	Division 1			3	0-10	3	0-07	6	0-17
Galway	2016	Division 1			3	0-04	1	0-01	4	0-05
Galway	2017	Division 1			2	0-02	2	0-01	4	0-03
Galway	2018	Division 1			2	0-00	1	0-01	3	0-01
Galway	2019	Division 1	DNP		DNP		DNP		DNP	
Galway	2020	Division 1			1	0-03	—		1	0-03
Galway	2021	Division 1			2	0-02	—		2	0-02
Galway	2022	Division 1			3	0-06	3	0-01	6	0-07
Galway	2023	Division 1			1	0-00	4	0-04	5	0-04
Galway	2024	Division 1			3	1-03	7	1-13	10	2-16
Career total					32	3-50	32	1-43	64	4-93

== Honours ==
St James'

- Galway Minor Football Championships (2): 2006, 2007,
- Galway Intermediate Football Championship (1): 2010
- Connacht Intermediate Club Football Championship (1): 2010

Galway

- Connacht Minor Football Championship (1): 2007
- All-Ireland Minor Football Championship (1): 2007
- Connacht Senior Football Championship (7): 2008, 2016, 2018, 2022, 2023, 2024, 2025.
- National Football League, Division 2 (1): 2017

Individual

- All Star (1): 2024
- GAA/GPA Footballer of the Year (1): 2024

Awards and achievements
Preceded by David Clifford	GAA/GPA Footballer of the Year; 2024	Succeeded by David Clifford
Sporting positions
Preceded by Finian Hanley	Galway Senior Football Captain; 2014–2016	Succeeded by Gary O'Donnell
