= Tiernan Kelly =

Armagh Gaelic footballer

Personal information
- Native name: Tiarnán Ó Ceallaigh (Irish)

Sport
- Sport: Gaelic football
- Position: Midfield
Club
- Years: Club
- Clann Éireann GAC
Club titles
- Armagh titles: 2
Inter-county
- Years: County
- 2021-: Armagh
Inter-county titles
- All-Irelands: 1

Tiernan Kelly is a Gaelic footballer who plays for the Armagh county football team.

== Gaelic football ==
Kelly won the Hogan Cup with St Ronan's, Lurgan, as well as representing Armagh at junior level before making his senior debut against Antrim in the 2021 Ulster Senior Football Championship, scoring a goal in that appearance.

Kelly played in all of Armagh's league games in 2022, but was absent for much of the championship campaign owing to injury problems. He returned for the All-Ireland quarter final against Galway, but in a fracas at the end of normal time, Kelly was judged to have gouged the eyes of Galway's Damien Comer, and received a 24-week ban.

Kelly was part of the Armagh team which won the 2024 All-Ireland Senior Football Championship, scoring one point in the final.

He plays club football for Clann Éireann, Lurgan, and was a member of their Armagh Senior Football Championship winning sides in 2021 and 2024.

== Honours ==
- All-Ireland Senior Football Championship: (1) 2024
- Hogan Cup: (1) 2018
- Armagh Senior Football Championship: (2) 2021, 2024
