= Kevin McLoughlin =

Irish Gaelic footballer

Personal information
- Born: 22 May 1989 (age 37) Dublin, Ireland
- Height: 1.55 m (5 ft 1 in)

Sport
- Sport: Gaelic football
- Position: Right Half Forward
Club
Years	Club	Apps (scores)
?–	Knockmore	2
Club titles
- Mayo titles: 2
Inter-county
Years	County	Apps (scores)
2009–2023	Mayo	5–60
Inter-county titles
- Connacht titles: 8
- All-Irelands: 0
- NFL: 1
- All Stars: 0

Kevin McLoughlin (born 1989) is a Gaelic footballer who plays for Knockmore and the Mayo county team.

He has started at right half forward in six All-Ireland football finals: the 2012 decider, which Mayo lost by 0–13 to 2–11 against Donegal and the 2013 decider, which Mayo lost by 1–14 to 2–12 against Dublin. He also played in the 2016, 2017, 2020 and 2021 finals.

McLoughlin played in the first Test for Ireland against Australia in the 2013 International Rules Series, scoring one goal.

== Honours ==
- Connacht Senior Football Championship (8): 2009, 2011, 2012, 2013, 2014, 2015, 2020, 2021
- FBD Connacht League (2): 2010, 2012
- Connacht Under-21 Football Championship (1): 2009
