= Lee Keegan =

Mayo Gaelic footballer

Personal information
- Born: 25 October 1989 (age 37)
- Height: 178 cm (5 ft 10 in)

Sport
- Sport: Gaelic football
- Position: Wing back
Club
- Years: Club
- 2006–: Westport
Club titles
- Mayo titles: 1
Inter-county*
Years	County	Apps (scores)
2011–2023	Mayo	67 (7–48)
Inter-county titles
- Connacht titles: 7
- All-Irelands: 0
- NFL: 1
- All Stars: 5
- *Inter County team apps and scores correct as of 27 June 2022.

Lee Keegan (born 25 October 1989) is a Gaelic footballer who plays as a defender for Westport and, formerly, for the Mayo county team. Many regard Keegan as his county's greatest ever footballer. He is also the highest scoring defender of all-time having clocked up 6–40 in 54 championship matches.

Keegan is the only player to win five All Stars without winning an All-Ireland medal. He also scored a goal against Dublin goalkeeper Stephen Cluxton in three consecutive championship matches.

He has been an analyst on The Sunday Game and a Gaelic football analyst for RTÉ Sport since 2022.

== Early life ==
Keegan attended Rice College, Westport and played football for the school. Kevin Keane, another Westport player, attended Rice College at the same time and played with Keegan on the school team. Rugby union interested Keegan as a child and he was part of Connacht Rugby underage academies.

== Playing career ==
=== Club ===
Keegan won the 2009 and 2016 Mayo Intermediate Football Championship with his club Westport.

In October 2016, he won a Connacht Intermediate Club Football Championship.

In February 2017, Keegan won an All-Ireland Intermediate Club Football Championship title with Westport, with the club defeating Meath's St Colmcilles by a scoreline of 2–12 to 3–08 in the final.

In October 2022, he won a Mayo Senior Football Championship, which was Westport's first.

=== Inter-county ===
Keegan never played at minor level. However, he played in the county under-21 team in 2009 and 2010.

As a senior player, Keegan became particularly known for his encounters with Dublin. He first played Dublin in a National Football League game that was abandoned midway due to fog (although the GAA officially counts those sorts of matches, even if the result is void).

Keegan started at right half back in consecutive All-Ireland football finals: the 2012 decider, which Mayo lost by a scoreline of 0–13 to 2–11 against Donegal and the 2013 decider, which Mayo lost by a scoreline of 1–14 to 2–12 against Dublin. He was named in the 2012 All Star football team in the right half-back position.

Keegan played against Dublin again in the 2016 All-Ireland Senior Football Championship Final and was shown a black card so had to be substituted. In November 2016, he was named as the GAA/GPA Footballer of the Year for 2016, and also picked up his fourth All-Star award.

Keegan played against Dublin again in the 2017 All-Ireland Senior Football Championship Final.

He was centrally involved in Mayo's 2021 All-Ireland SFC semi-final comeback against Dublin. He then attempted to help his team come from behind against Tyrone in the final but did not succeed and Mayo lost again. It was his seventh All-Ireland SFC final appearance. He received a fifth All-Star. He was also nominated for the All Stars Footballer of the Year Award for a second time.

On 9 January 2023, Keegan announced his retirement from inter-county football.

=== International ===
Keegan played twice for Ireland against Australia in the 2013 International Rules Series, which Ireland won.

Keegan was also named in the squad for the 2014 International Rules Series.

Keegan was named as vice-captain for the 2015 International Rules Series. Ireland won the 2015 Series.

== Player profile ==
The Irish Independent's Frank Roche described Keegan in 2022 as "A smiling assassin in one game; a man-marking pest the next". In June 2022, Maurice Brosnan (a sports journalist) tweeted a one-minute video montage featuring six points Keegan had scored in the championship over the previous ten months. Keegan scored the six points as follows: when Mayo were four points behind Dublin, five points behind Tyrone, six points behind Galway, after twenty scoreless minutes against Monaghan and — the latest two — against Kildare in June 2022 when Mayo was three points behind Kildare (leaning back and falling) and then four points behind the same team (with his weaker left foot, almost standing upright, past several Kildare players). Former Mayo forward John Casey commented: "The two points he got against Kildare were unreal. He was falling for the first one in the first half, he was leaning back and he fell as he kicked it. But the point he got in the second half — Jesus Christ. If Ciarán McDonald got it we'd have been raving about it for years".

Keegan had two hip surgeries at the end of 2017. He had an operation on a dislocated shoulder in 2018 (experiencing his third concussion at the same time) and damaged an ankle ligament in 2019. Mayo, Rice College and Westport teammate Kevin Keane later said: "People are very quick to judge. Even in 2019, against Dublin [when his performance against Con O'Callaghan was scrutinised], Lee was held together with an ankle injury".

== Personal life ==
Keegan is married to Aoife with two young daughters.

== Career statistics ==
As of match played 26 June 2022.

Team	Year	National League			Connacht		All-Ireland		Total	
Team	Year	Division	Apps	Score	Apps	Score	Apps	Score	Apps	Score
Mayo	2011	Division 1	2	0–00	—		2	0–01	4	0–01
Mayo	2012	Division 1	10	0–01	2	0–02	3	0–02	15	0–05
Mayo	2013	Division 1	8	0–04	3	0–04	3	0–05	14	0–13
Mayo	2014	Division 1	8	1–07	3	1–02	3	0–02	14	2–11
Mayo	2015	Division 1	7	0–00	2	1–00	3	1–04	12	2–04
Mayo	2016	Division 1	4	0–01	2	0–01	7	1–05	13	1–07
Mayo	2017	Division 1	5	0–06	2	0–00	7	2–06	14	2–12
Mayo	2018	Division 1	2	0–00	—		3	0–01	5	0–01
Mayo	2019	Division 1	7	0–01	2	0–02	7	1–05	16	1–08
Mayo	2020	Division 1	6	0–00	3	0–00	2	0–00	11	0–00
Mayo	2021	Division 2	4	0–01	2	0–00	2	0–02	8	0–03
Mayo	2022	Division 1	7	0–00	1	0–01	3	0–03	11	0–04
Career total			70	1–21	22	2–12	45	5–36	137	8–69

== Honours ==
Mayo

- Connacht Senior Football Championship (7): 2011, 2012, 2013, 2014, 2015, 2020, 2021
- National Football League (1): 2019

Westport

- Mayo Senior Football Championship (1): 2022
- Mayo Intermediate Football Championship (2): 2009, 2016
- Connacht Intermediate Club Football Championship(1): 2016
- All-Ireland Intermediate Club Football Championship (1): 2017

Ireland

- International Rules Series (2): 2013, 2015 (v.c.)

Individual

- GAA/GPA Footballer of the Year: 2016
  - Nominated again in 2021
- All Star: 2012, 2013, 2015, 2016, 2021
- In May 2020, a public poll conducted by RTÉ.ie named Keegan in the half-back line alongside Jack McCaffrey and Tomás Ó Sé in a team of footballers who had won All Stars during the era of The Sunday Game.
- Also in May 2020, the Irish Independent named Keegan as one of the "dozens of brilliant players" who narrowly missed selection for its "Top 20 footballers in Ireland over the past 50 years".
