= 2022 Connacht Senior Football Championship =

Gaelic football season

2022 Connacnt SFC
Tournament details
- Year: 2022
- Trophy: J. J. Nestor Cup
- Date: 17 April - 29 May 2022.

Winners
- Champions: Galway (48th win)

Runners-up
- Runners-up: Roscommon

Other
- Matches played: 6

The 2022 Connacht Senior Football Championship was the 2022 iteration of the Connacht Senior Football Championship organised by Connacht GAA.

London and New York were withdrawn from the 2020 and 2021 Connacht championships as part of the impact of the COVID-19 pandemic on Gaelic games, due to international travel restrictions, but both returned for the 2022 season.

Galway won the competition.

== Teams ==
The 2022 Connacht championship is contested by the five counties in the Irish province of Connacht and the two foreign-based teams of London and New York.

County	Sponsor	Manager	Captain	Last Connacht Title
Galway	Supermac's	Pádraic Joyce	Seán Kelly	2018
Leitrim	J. P. Clarke's Saloon, New York	Andy Moran	Wayne McKeon	1994
London	-	Michael Maher	-	-
Mayo	Intersport Elverys	James Horan	Stephen Coen	2021
New York	-	Johnny McGeeney	-	-
Roscommon	Ballymore	Anthony Cunningham	Enda Smith	2019
Sligo	AbbVie	Tony McEntee	Keelan Cawley	2007

== Draw ==
One team received a bye to the semi-finals. London and New York had home advantage in the quarter-finals.

Predetermined Match A	Predetermined Match B	Unseeded
New York Sligo	Leitrim London	Galway Mayo Roscommon

== Bracket ==
Quarter-finals
Mayo	0–16
Galway	1–14
London	2–11
Leitrim	3–12
New York	0–15
Sligo	1–16

Semi-finals
Galway	4–20
Leitrim	0–09
Sligo	0–11
Roscommon	0–23

Final
Galway	2–19
Roscommon	2–16

== Quarter-finals ==
17 April 2022; Quarter-final	New York	0-15 - 1-16	Sligo	Gaelic Park, New York; Attendance: 4,000; Referee: Sean Hurson (Tyrone)
17 April 2022; Quarter-final	A Varley 0-6 (0-3f), N Madine 0-4 (0-2f), D O'Sullivan 0-2, P Fox 0-2, M Brosnan 0-1.	Report	S Carrabine 1-3 (0-2f), N Murphy 0-5 (0-4f), P O’Connor 0-3, N Mullen 0-1, B Gorman 0-1, K Cawley 0-1, C Griffin 0-1, A Devanney 0-1.	Gaelic Park, New York; Attendance: 4,000; Referee: Sean Hurson (Tyrone)

17 April 2022; Quarter-final	London	2-11 - 3-12	Leitrim	McGovern Park, Ruislip; Referee: Martin McNally (Monaghan)
17 April 2022; Quarter-final	H Walsh (0-2), C Farley (0-2, frees 0-2), T Lenihan (0-1), L Gavaghan (0-4, frees 0-4), S Dornan (0-1), S Hickey (1-0), F McMahon (1-0), J Hynes (0-1)	Report	R O'Rourke (2-2), D Wrynn (1-3, 0-1 45'), P Dolan (0-3), D Rooney (0-2, 0-1 free), C Dolan (0-1), E Sweeney (0-1),	McGovern Park, Ruislip; Referee: Martin McNally (Monaghan)

24 April 2022
Quarter Final

Mayo	0-16 - 1-14	Galway
Cillian O'Connor 0-6f, Ryan O'Donoghue 0-4 (0-1m), James Carr 0-2, Lee Keegan, Eoghan McLaughlin, Diarmuid O'Connor, Kevin McLoughlin 0-1 each	Report	Shane Walsh 0-5 (0-3f, 2 '45), Johnny Heaney 1-1, Paul Conroy 0-3, Kieran Molloy, Niall Daly, Robert Finnerty, Damien Comer, Cillian McDaid 0-1 each

MacHale Park, Castlebar
Attendance: 24,557
Referee: David Coldrick (Meath)

== Semi-finals ==
30 April 2022
Semi Final

Sligo	0-11 - 0-23	Roscommon
	Report

Markievicz Park, Sligo
Attendance: 6,059

8 May 2022
Semi Final

Galway	4-20 - 0-09	Leitrim
	Report

Pearse Stadium, Galway
Attendance: 4,749
Referee: P Faloon (Down)

== Final ==
29 May 2022
Final

Galway	2-19 - 2-16	Roscommon
Shane Walsh 1-6 (1f, 245s), Rob Finnerty 0-5, Patrick Kelly 1-0, Damien Comer 0-3, Johnny Heaney 0-2, Kieran Molloy, Cillian McDaid, and Paul Conroy 0-1 each.	Report	Conor Cox 0-5 (3fs), Conor Daly and Diarmuid Murtagh (1f) 1-1 each, Ultan Harney 0-3, Donie Smith 0-2 (1f), Ciaráin Murtagh, Cian McKeon, Cathal Heneghan, and Enda Smith 0-1 each.

Pearse Stadium, Galway
Attendance: 21,419
Referee: Joe McQuillan (Cavan)

Galway advanced to the 2022 All-Ireland SFC quarter-finals, while Roscommon advanced to the 2022 All-Ireland SFC qualifiers.

== All-Ireland/Tailteann Cup qualification ==
NFL Rank	Team	Championship	Qualification Method
2	Mayo	Advance to the 2022 All-Ireland Senior Football Championship	Via the 2022 National Football League
7	Roscommon	Advance to the 2022 All-Ireland Senior Football Championship	Via Provincial Final
8	Galway	Advance to the 2022 All-Ireland Senior Football Championship	Via Provincial Final
27	Sligo	Advance to the 2022 Tailteann Cup	Via the 2022 National Football League
28	Leitrim	Advance to the 2022 Tailteann Cup	Via the 2022 National Football League
29	London	Advance to the 2022 Tailteann Cup	Via the 2022 National Football League
-	New York	Advance to the 2022 Tailteann Cup	Via the 2022 National Football League

== See also ==
- 2022 All-Ireland Senior Football Championship
- 2022 Leinster Senior Football Championship
- 2022 Munster Senior Football Championship
- 2022 Ulster Senior Football Championship
