= 2014 Connacht Senior Football Championship =

2014 Connacht SFC
Tournament details
- Year: 2014

Winners
- Champions: Mayo (45th win)
- Manager: James Horan

Runners-up
- Runners-up: Galway

The 2014 Connacht Senior Football Championship was the 115th installment of the annual Connacht Senior Football Championship held under the auspices of Connacht GAA. It was one of the four provincial competitions of the 2014 All-Ireland Senior Football Championship. Mayo entered the competition as defending Connacht champions.

The draw to decide the fixtures was made on 3 October 2013. As in previous competitions, the opponents of London and New York in the opening round were decided in advance. The teams that visit the 'Exiles' are chosen on a cyclical basis. As in the 2009 Connacht Championship five years previously, Galway face London and Mayo face New York. Sligo were given a bye to the semi-final stage.

Under new GAA rules, to allow counties to more easily predict the dates of their qualifier matches, the two sides of the draw were named as either A or B. Galway, London and Sligo were named on the A side of the draw, while Leitrim, Mayo, New York and Roscommon's draw was named as the B side.

The opening game of the Championship was played on 4 May 2014, with Mayo beating New York by 4-18 to 0-08. On 18 May 2014 Roscommon defeated Leitrim in Dr. Hyde Park, winning 1-18 to 0-13, and the following week Galway beat London in the last of the quarter-finals, with a final score of 3-17 to 0-07. In the first of the semi-finals, which took place on 8 June 2014, Mayo faced Roscommon in Hyde Park, coming out with a narrow victory, winning 0-13 to 1-09. The second semi-final was contested by Galway and Sligo in Markievicz Park on 25 June 2014, with the Tribesmen coming out on top by 0-16 to 0-11, qualifying for their first Connacht final since 2009.

The decider was played on 13 July 2014, with Galway facing Mayo in MacHale Park. Mayo were comfortably the better team in the first half, and led by 1-09 to 0-05 at the interval. Despite pressure from Galway early in the second half, with Shane Walsh hitting the crossbar and later having a penalty saved, Mayo maintained their lead through second half goals from Barry Moran and Jason Doherty. Mayo ultimately won by a score of 3-14 to 0-16. Mayo lifted the J.J. Nestor Cup for the fourth season in a row, the first time the county achieved a Connacht four-in-a-row since the 1951 season.

== Teams ==
The Connacht championship is contested by the five counties in the Irish province of Connacht and the two foreign based teams of London and New York.

Team	Colours	Sponsor	Manager	Captain	Most recent success
Team	Colours	Sponsor	Manager	Captain	All-Ireland	Provincial
Galway	Maroon and white	Supermac's	Alan Mulholland	Paul Conroy	2001	2008
Leitrim	Green and gold	The Bush Hotel	Seán Hagan	Emlyn Mulligan		1994
London	Green and white	Bewley's Hotels	Paul Coggins	Seamus Hannon
Mayo	Green and red	Elverys Sports	James Horan	Andy Moran	1951	2013
New York	Red, white and blue	Navillus Contracting	Ian Galvin	Brendan Quigley
Roscommon	Primrose and blue	Hospice Foundation	John Evans	Niall Carty	1944	2010
Sligo	Black and white	Radisson Blu, Sligo	Pat Flanagan	Adrian Marren		2007

== Bracket ==
Quarter-finals
New York	0-08
Mayo	4-18
Roscommon	1-18
Leitrim	0-13
London	0-07
Galway	3-17

Semi-finals
Mayo	0-13
Roscommon	1-09
Sligo	0-11
Galway	0-16

Final
Mayo	3-14
Galway	0-16

== Fixtures ==
=== Quarter-finals ===
4 May 2014
7.30pm (Irish time)
Quarter-Final

New York	0-8 – 4-18	Mayo
J. Kelly (0-03), R. Wherity, J. McGeeney, G. O'Driscoll, A. Rafferty, B. Quigley (0-01 each)	Report	C. O'Connor (2-05), E. Varley (1-01), D. O'Connor (1-00), A. Moran (0-03), A. O'Shea, K. McLoughlin, D. Vaughan (0-02 each), L. Keegan, J. Gibbons, D. Coen (0-01 each)

Gaelic Park, New York City
Attendance: 4,000
Referee: Pauric O Sullivan (Kerry)

18 May 2014
3.00pm
Quarter-Final

Roscommon	1-18 – 0-13	Leitrim
K. Higgins, S. Kilbride (0-04 each), R. Stack (1-00), C. Murtagh, D. Murtagh, N. Daly (0-02 each), C. Burns, C. Cafferkey, C. Cregg, C. Shine (0-01 each)	Report	E. Mulligan (0-08), C. Beirne (0-02), K. Conlon, W. McKeon, G. Reynolds (0-01 each)

Dr Hyde Park, Roscommon
Attendance: 8,055
Referee: Conor Lane (Cork)

25 May 2014
3.00pm
Quarter-Final

London	0-7 – 3-17	Galway
A. Faherty, L. Mulvey (0-03 each), J. Feeney (0-01)	Report	S. Walsh (1-06), D.Cummins, M. Martin (1-03 each), E. Hoare (0-03), M. Lundy, A. Varley (0-01 each)

Emerald GAA Grounds, London
Attendance: 3,000
Referee: Fergal Kelly (Longford)

=== Semi-finals ===
8 June 2014
2.00pm
Semi-Final

Roscommon	1-9 – 0-13	Mayo
C Cafferkey (1-00), S Kilbride, D Murtagh (0-03 each), D Shine, K Higgins, M Nally (0-01 each)	Report	C O’Connor (0-05), K McLoughlin (0-04), A Moran (0-02), J Doherty, S O’Shea (0-01 each)

Dr Hyde Park, Roscommon
Attendance: 15,873
Referee: Eddie Kinsella (Laois)

21 June 2014
7.00pm
Semi-Final

Sligo	0-11 – 0-16	Galway
A Marren (0-04), M Breheny (0-02), D Kelly, S McManus, P Hughes, N Murphy, K McDonnell (0-01 each)	Report	S Walsh (0-06), D Cummins (0-04), M Martin, E Hoare (0-02 each), M Lundy, D Comer (0-01 each)

Markievicz Park, Sligo
Attendance: 8,250
Referee: Maurice Deegan (Laois)

=== Final ===
13 July 2014
2.00pm
Final

Mayo	3-14 – 0-16	Galway
C O’Connor (0-08, 5fs), J Doherty, L Keegan (1-01 each), B Moran (1-00), K McLoughlin (0-03), A Dillon (0-01)	Report	S Walsh (0-07, 5fs), P Conroy (0-04), S Armstrong (0-02), G Bradshaw, M Lundy, D Cummins (0-01 each)

MacHale Park, Castlebar
Attendance: 26,738
Referee: R Hickey (Clare)

== See also ==
Fixtures and results

- 2014 All-Ireland Senior Football Championship
  - 2014 Leinster Senior Football Championship
  - 2014 Munster Senior Football Championship
  - 2014 Ulster Senior Football Championship
