= 2026 Connacht Senior Football Championship =

Gaelic football competition

2026 Connacht SFC
Tournament details
- Province: Connacht
- Year: 2026
- Trophy: Nestor Cup
- Date: 11 April – 10 May 2026
- Defending champions: Galway

Winners
- Champions: Roscommon (25th win)
- Manager: Mark Dowd
- Captain: Diarmuid Murtagh

Runners-up
- Runners-up: Galway
- Manager: Pádraic Joyce
- Captain: John Maher

The 2026 Connacht Senior Football Championship was the 2026 iteration of the annual Connacht Senior Football Championship organised by Connacht GAA. It was one of the four provincial competitions of the 2026 All-Ireland Senior Football Championship. The winning team received the Nestor Cup. The draw for the competition was made on 27 November 2025. The defending champion is Galway.

== Teams ==
=== General Information ===
Seven counties will compete in the Connacht Senior Football Championship:

County	Last Provincial Title	Last Championship Title	Position in 2025 Championship
Galway	2025	2001	Champions
Leitrim	1994	—	Semi-finals
London	—	—	Quarter-finals
Mayo	2021	2026	Runners-up
New York	—	—	Quarter-finals
Roscommon	2019	1944	Semi-finals
Sligo	2007	—	Quarter-finals

=== Personnel and kits ===
County	Manager(s)	Captain(s)	Sponsors
Galway	Pádraic Joyce	John Maher	Supermac's
Leitrim	Steven Poacher	Ryan O'Rourke	Gallagher Group
London	Michael Maher	Liam Gallagher	Clayton Hotel
Mayo	Andy Moran	Jack Coyne	Intersport Elverys
New York	Ronan McGinley	Jamie Boyle	Navillus
Roscommon	Mark Dowd	Diarmuid Murtagh	Ballymore
Sligo	Eamonn O'Hara Dessie Sloyan	Niall Murphy	AbbVie

== Bracket ==
Quarter-finals
11 April, Ruislip
London	1-15
Mayo	0-31
12 April, New York City
New York	1-10
Roscommon	5-22
12 April, Sligo
Sligo	1-20
Leitrim	3-15

Semi-finals
26 April, Castlebar
Mayo	1-18
Roscommon	2-25
25 April, Carrick-on-Shannon
Leitrim	2-12
Galway	1-20

Final
10 May, Roscommon
Roscommon	3-21
Galway	2-22

== Quarter-finals ==
11 April 2026 Quarter-final	Mayo	0-31 (31) – (18) 1-15	London	Ruislip
14:30		(HT: 0-17 - 0-6)		Venue: McGovern Park
	Pts: Ryan O'Donoghue 0-11 (1tpf, 1tp, 4f), Cian McHale 0-6 (2tp, 2f), Jack Carney 0-3 (1tp), Paul Towey 0-2 (tp), Michael Plunkett 0-2 (tp), Robbie Hennelly 0-2 (1'45, 1f), Paddy Durcan 0-2, Bob Tuohy 0-1, Jordan Flynn 0-1, Tommy Conroy 0-1	Report	Pts: Jim Davis 0-6 (3tp), Joe McGill 0-5 (1tp, 3f), Shay Rafter 0-3 (1f), Micheal O'Reilly 1-0, Kristian Healy 0-1	Referee: Patrick Neilan (Roscommon); TV: GAA+

12 April 2026 Quarter-final	Roscommon	5-22 (37) – (13) 1-10	New York	The Bronx
15:00 EDT (UTC–4)		(HT: 5-11 - 1-4)		Venue: Gaelic Park
	Pts: Enda Smith 1-2, Robert Heneghan 1-2, Dylan Ruane 1-1, Darragh Heneghan 1-1, Eoin McCormack 1-0, Daire Cregg 0-3 (1f), Diarmuid Murtagh 0-2 (1f), Keith Doyle 0-2, Senan Lambe 0-2 (1tp), Shane Cunnane 0-2, Conor Carroll 0-2 (2 45s), Eoin Ward 0-1, Conor Ryan 0-1, Paul Carey 0-1 (1f); Daire Cregg (red card) 35'	Report	Pts: Frank O'Reilly 0-5 (2f), Jack McKenna 1-1, Killian Butler 0-2, Jack Foley 0-1, Conor Keenan 0-1	Referee: Brendan Cawley (Kildare); TV: GAA+

12 April 2026 Quarter-final	Sligo	1-20 (23) – (24) 3-15	Leitrim	Sligo
15:00		(HT: 0-7 - 2-7)		Venue: Markievicz Park
	Pts: Lee Deignan 0-7 (1tp, 2f), Alan McLoughlin 0-5 (3f, 1tp), Luke Towey 0-3 (1tp), Pat Spillane 1-0, Niall Murphy 0-2 (1f), Cian Lally 0-1, Jack Lavin 0-1, David Quinn 0-1	Report	Pts: Barry McNulty 1-6 (1tp, 1f), Oisin McLoughlin 0-1, Ryan O'Rourke 1-0, Keith Keegan 1-0, Sean Harkin 0-2, Tom Prior 0-2, Fergal McLoughlin 0-1, Paul Honeyman 0-1	Referee: Fergal Kelly (Longford)

== Semi-finals ==
25 April 2026 Semi-final	Galway	1-20 (23) – 2-12 (18)	Leitrim	Carrick-on-Shannon
15:30		(HT: 0-11 - 0-4)		Venue: Páirc Seán Mac Diarmada
	Pts: Robert Finnerty 0-4 (1tp, 2f), Paul Conroy 0-3 (1tp), Shane Walsh 0-3 (2f), Liam Ó Conghaile 0-3 (1tp), Dylan McHugh 1-0, Cillian McDade 0-2, Sean Kelly 0-1, Shane McGrath 0-1, John Maher 0-1, Finnian Ó Laoi 0-1, John Daly 0-1	Report	Pts: Oisín McLaughlin 1-1, Killian Gaffey 0-3 (1tp, 1 45), Jack Kelly 1-0, Riordan O'Rourke 0-2, Barry McNulty 0-2 (1tpf), Paul Honeyman 0-2 (1tp), Ben Guckian 0-1 (1f), Ryan O'Rourke 0-1 (1f)	Referee: Niall Cullen (Fermanagh); Attendance: 4,843; TV: GAA+

26 April 2026 Semi-final	Mayo	1-18 (21) – 2-25 (31)	Roscommon	Castlebar
16:00		(HT: 1-11 - 1-08)		Venue: McHale Park
	Pts: Ryan O'Donoghue 1-4 (1tpf, 2f), Kobe McDonald 0-6 (1tpf), Conor Loftus 0-2, Paddy Durcan 0-2, Jordan Flynn 0-1, Paddy Durcan 0-1, Jack Carney 0-1, Matthew Ruane 0-1	Report	Pts: Diarmuid Murtagh 1-10 (1tp, 1tpf, 2f), Darragh Heneghan 1-3, Enda Smith 0-3, Dylan Ruane 0-3, Robert Heneghan 0-2 (1f), Keith Doyle 0-2, Colm Neary 0-1, Conor Hand 0-1	Referee: David Coldrick (Meath); Attendance: 15,321; TV: RTÉ2, GAA+

== Final ==
10 May 2026 Final	Galway	2-22 (28) – 3-21 (30)	Roscommon	Roscommon
		(HT: 1-14 - 2-8)		Venue: Dr Hyde Park
	Pts: Shane Walsh 0-9 (2tp, 1tpf, 1 45), Damien Comer 1-2, Robert Finnerty 1-1, Paul Conroy 0-4 (2tp), Kieran Molloy 0-2 (tp), Seán Kelly 0-2 (1f), Céin D’Arcy 0-1, Dylan McHugh 0-1.	Report	Pts: Darragh Heneghan 2-2, Diarmuid Murtagh 0-7 (1tpf, 2f), Robert Heneghan 1-0, Conor Ryan 0-3 (1tp), Daire Cregg 0-3 (1tp, 1f), Paul Carey 0-2 (1tp), Dylan Ruane 0-1, Senan Lambe 0-1, Keith Doyle 0-1, Conor Carroll 0-1 (1 45)	Referee: Sean Hurson (Tyrone); Attendance: 22,799; TV: RTÉ2, GAA+

GK	1	Conor Caroll
FB	2	Patrick Gavin (substituted off) 56'
FB	3	Caelim Keogh
FB	4	Eoin McCormack
HB	5	Eoin Ward	(substituted off) 51'
HB	6	Ronan Daly
HB	7	Senan Lambe
MF	8	Keith Doyle
MF	9	Conor Ryan	(substituted off) 64'
HF	10	Dylan Ruane
HF	11	Enda Smith
HF	12	Darragh Heneghan	(substituted off) 65'
FF	13	Diarmuid Murtagh (c)
FF	14	Colm Neary	(substituted off) 62'
FF	15	Robert Heneghan	(substituted off) 46'
Substitutes:
	16	Aaron Brady
	17	Niall Higgins
	18	Robbie Dolan
	19	Ruaidhrí Fallon	(substituted on) 51'
	20	Brian Stack
	21	Jack Duggan
	22	Shane Cunnane	(substituted on) 64'
	23	Daire Cregg	(substituted on) 46'
	24	Paul Carey	(substituted on) 56'
	25	Conor Hand	(substituted on) 62'
	26	Cian McKeon	(substituted on) 65'
Manager:
Mark Dowd

GK	1	Conor Flaherty
FB	2	Johnny McGrath
FB	3	Seán Kelly
FB	4	Jack Glynn
HB	5	Dylan McHugh
HB	18	Kieran Molloy	(substituted off) 51'
HB	7	Liam Silke
MF	8	Paul Conroy	(substituted off) 51'
MF	9	John Maher (c)
HF	10	Daniel O'Flaherty	(substituted off) 36'
HF	11	Cillian McDaid	(substituted off) 61'
HF	12	Cein Darcy
FF	13	Robert Finnerty	(substituted off) 60'
FF	14	Shane Walsh
FF	21	Ryan Roche	(substituted off) 42'
Substitutes:
	16	Conor Gleeson
	17	Brian Cogger
	6	John Daly	(substituted on) 51'
	19	Seán Mulkerrin
	20	Cian Hernon	(substituted on) 51'
	15	Liam Ó Conghaile
	22	Matthew Tierney	(substituted on) 60'
	23	Finnian Ó Laoi	(substituted on) 36'
	24	Ciarán Mulhern
	25	Shane McGrath	(substituted on) 61'
	26	Damien Comer	(substituted on) 42'
Manager:
Pádraic Joyce

== Statistics ==
=== Scoring Events ===
- Widest winning margin: 24 points
  - Roscommon 5-22 – 1-10 New York (Quarter-finals)
- Most goals in a match: 6
  - Roscommon 5-22 – 1-10 New York (Quarter-finals)
- Most points in a match: 46
  - Mayo 0-31 – 1-15 London (Quarter-finals)
- Most goals by one team in a match: 5
  - Roscommon 5-22 – 1-10 New York (Quarter-finals)
- Most points by one team in a match: 31
  - Mayo 0-31 – 1-15 London (Quarter-finals)
- Highest aggregate score: 58 points
  - Roscommon 3-21 – 2-22 Galway (Final)
- Lowest aggregate score: 41 points
  - Galway 1-20 - 2-12 Leitrim (Semi-finals)

== Miscellaneous ==
- Due to the impact of the COVID-19 pandemic on Gaelic games in 2021, it took an extra five years for Roscommon to play New York and Mayo to play London also to be featured on the draws for first since 2016.
- The Connacht final saw a first home win for Roscommon over Galway since 1990 at the same stage.

== See also ==
- 2026 All-Ireland Senior Football Championship
  - 2026 Leinster Senior Football Championship
  - 2026 Munster Senior Football Championship
  - 2026 Ulster Senior Football Championship
