= 2021 Connacht Senior Football Championship =

Gaelic football season

2021 Connacnt SFC
Tournament details
- Year: 2021
- Trophy: J. J. Nestor Cup

Winners
- Champions: Mayo (48th win)
- Manager: James Horan
- Captain: Aidan O'Shea

Runners-up
- Runners-up: Galway
- Manager: Pádraic Joyce
- Captain: Shane Walsh

Other
- Matches played: 4

The 2021 Connacht Senior Football Championship was the 2021 iteration of the Connacht Senior Football Championship organised by Connacht GAA.

== Teams ==
The 2021 Connacht championship was contested by the five counties in the Irish province of Connacht. London and New York were withdrawn from the 2020 and 2021 Connacht championships as part of the impact of the COVID-19 pandemic on Gaelic games, due to international travel restrictions. There was a full open draw for the first time in more than 40 years. It took place on 19 April 2021. Sligo withdrew from the championship in 2020 but returned in 2021. London and New York returned in 2022 but games for 2021 fixtures took place in 2026.

=== Cancelled games ===
2021 Quarter-final	Mayo	v	London	Ruislip
				Venue: McGovern Park

2021 Quarter-final	Roscommon	v	New York	New York
				Venue: Gaelic Park

Team	Colours	Sponsor	Manager	Captain	Most recent success
Team	Colours	Sponsor	Manager	Captain	All-Ireland	Provincial
Galway	Maroon and white	Supermac's	Pádraic Joyce	Shane Walsh	2001	2018
Leitrim	Green and gold	J. P. Clarke's Saloon, New York	Terry Hyland	Wayne McKeon		1994
London*	Green and white		Michael Maher
Mayo	Green and red	Intersport Elverys	James Horan	Aidan O'Shea	1951	2020
New York*	Red, white and blue
Roscommon	Blue and yellow	Ballymore	Anthony Cunningham	Enda Smith	1944	2019
Sligo	Black and white	AbbVie	Tony McEntee	Keelan Cawley		2007

- = Due to the COVID-19 pandemic, on 11 December 2020, the GAA decided to cancel Roscommon hosting New York, On 8 April 2021, Mayo cancelled hosting London. They were both back for the 2022 campaign.

== Bracket ==
Quarter-finals
Mayo	3-23
Sligo	0-12

Semi-finals
Leitrim	0-11
Mayo	5-20
Galway	2-11
Roscommon	0-12

Final
Mayo	2-14
Galway	2-8

== Quarter-finals ==
Two counties were randomly drawn to face each other in the quarter-finals. The lowest ranked county to play in the quarter-finals was Sligo of Division 4.

26 June 2021; 16:30; Quarter-final	Mayo (2)	3-23 - 0-12	Sligo (4)	Markievicz Park, Sligo; Attendance: 200; Referee: Paul Faloon (Down); Man of the Match: Aidan O'Shea (Breaffy)
26 June 2021; 16:30; Quarter-final	Aidan O'Shea 2-2, Darren McHale 1-5, Ryan O'Donoghue 0-5 (0-4f), Eoghan McLaughlin, Conor Loftus, Tommy Conroy 0-2 each, Patrick Durcan, Jordan Flynn, Fergal Boland, Stephen Coen, James Carr 0-1 each	Report	Niall Murphy 0-6 (0-1f), Sean Carrabine 0-2, Paddy O'Connor, Liam Gaughan, Mikey Gordon, Keelan Cawley 0-1 each	Markievicz Park, Sligo; Attendance: 200; Referee: Paul Faloon (Down); Man of the Match: Aidan O'Shea (Breaffy)

== Semi-finals ==
Three counties were given a bye to this stage and were joined by the winning team from quarter-final. The lowest ranked county to play in the semi-finals was Leitrim of Division 4.

4 July 2021; 13:15; Semi-final	Galway (1)	2-11 - 0-12	Roscommon (1)	Dr Hyde Park, Roscommon; Attendance: 1,049; Referee: Joe McQuillan (Cavan); Man of the Match: Matthew Tierney (Oughterard)
4 July 2021; 13:15; Semi-final	Matthew Tierney 1-3 (0-2f, 1 '45), Paul Kelly 1-2, Robert Finnerty and Shane Walsh (0-2f) 0-2 each, Sean Kelly and Damien Comer 0-1 each	Report	Enda Smith 0-3, Conor Daly and Donie Smith (1 '45) 0-2 each, Brian Stack, Conor Hussey, Ciaran Murtagh (0-1f), Diarmuid Murtagh, Cathal Cregg 0-1 each	Dr Hyde Park, Roscommon; Attendance: 1,049; Referee: Joe McQuillan (Cavan); Man of the Match: Matthew Tierney (Oughterard)

11 July 2021; 14:00; Semi-final	Mayo (2)	5-20 - 0-11	Leitrim (4)	MacHale Park, Castlebar; Attendance: 3,500; Referee: Fergal Kelly (Longford); Man of the Match: Ryan O'Donoghue (Belmullet)
11 July 2021; 14:00; Semi-final	Ryan O'Donoghue 1-6 (0-3f), Darren McHale 2-1, Darren Coen and Tommy Conroy 1-3 each, Matthew Ruane and Conor Loftus 0-2 each, Stephen Coen, Aidan O'Shea, James Carr 0-1 each	Report	Keith Beirne 0-5f, Conor Dolan and Riordan O'Rourke 0-2 each, Paddy Maguire and Evan Sweeney 0-1 each	MacHale Park, Castlebar; Attendance: 3,500; Referee: Fergal Kelly (Longford); Man of the Match: Ryan O'Donoghue (Belmullet)

== Final ==
25 July 2021; 13:30; Final	Mayo	2-14 - 2-8	Galway	Croke Park, Dublin; Attendance: 18,000; Referee: Conor Lane (Cork); Man of the Match: Matthew Ruane (Breaffy)
25 July 2021; 13:30; Final	Ryan O'Donoghue 1-3 (1-0 pen, 0-2f), Matthew Ruane 1-2, Conor Loftus and Tommy Conroy 0-2 each, Rob Hennelly (1 '45), Paddy Durcan, Darren McHale, Kevin McLoughlin, James Carr 0-1 each	Report	Shane Walsh 1-1, Matthew Tierney 0-4 (0-3f), Damien Comer 1-0, Paul Conroy 0-2, Cathal Sweeney 0-1	Croke Park, Dublin; Attendance: 18,000; Referee: Conor Lane (Cork); Man of the Match: Matthew Ruane (Breaffy)

Mayo qualified for the 2021 All-Ireland SFC semi-finals.

== See also ==
- 2021 All-Ireland Senior Football Championship
  - 2021 Leinster Senior Football Championship
  - 2021 Munster Senior Football Championship
  - 2021 Ulster Senior Football Championship
- Impact of the COVID-19 pandemic on Gaelic games
