= 2020 Connacht Senior Football Championship =

2020 Connacht SFC
Tournament details
- Year: 2020
- Trophy: J. J. Nestor Cup

Winners
- Champions: Mayo

Runners-up
- Runners-up: Galway

The 2020 Connacht Senior Football Championship was the 121st instalment of the annual Connacht Senior Football Championship organised by Connacht GAA. It is one of the four provincial competitions of the 2020 All-Ireland Senior Football Championship. The winning team (Mayo) received the J. J. Nestor Cup, named after J. J. Nestor of Quinaltagh, County Galway.

The draw for the Connacht Championship was made on 8 October 2019.

On 17 March, the GAA confirmed that the opening fixture – due to have taken place at Gaelic Park in The Bronx on 3 May – had been postponed due to the impact of the COVID-19 pandemic on Gaelic games.

Due to the COVID-19 pandemic, London, New York and Sligo did not compete in the championship. As a result, Galway advanced to the provincial final without playing a single match for the first time since 1965.

== Teams ==
The Connacht championship is contested by the five counties in the Irish province of Connacht plus London and New York.

Team	Colours	Sponsor	Manager	Captain	Most recent success
Team	Colours	Sponsor	Manager	Captain	All-Ireland	Provincial
Galway	Maroon and white	Supermac's	Pádraic Joyce	Shane Walsh	2001	2018
Leitrim	Green and gold	J.P. Clarke's Saloon, New York	Terry Hyland	Wayne McKeon		1994
London*	Green and white
Mayo	Green and red	Intersport Elverys	James Horan	Aidan O'Shea	1951	2015
New York*	Red, white and blue
Roscommon	Blue and yellow	Ballymore	Anthony Cunningham	Enda Smith	1944	2019
Sligo+	Black and white	AbbVie	Paul Taylor	Paddy O'Connor		2007

Due to COVID-19 withdrew teams: + = Back in 2021, * = Back in 2022.

== Bracket ==
Quarter-finals
Mayo	2-15
Leitrim	0-10

Semi-finals
Galway	w/o
Sligo	conc
Roscommon	0-13
Mayo	1-16

Final
Galway	0-13
Mayo	0-14

== Quarter-finals ==
=== Summary ===
Div	Team 1	Score	Team 2	Div
1	Galway	w/o - conc	New York	
2	Roscommon	w/o - conc	London	
3	Leitrim	0-10 - 2-15	Mayo	1

=== Matches ===
1 November 2020 Quarter-final	Galway	w/o – scr	New York	New York
				Venue: Gaelic Park

1 November 2020 Quarter-final	London	scr – w/o	Roscommon	Ruislip
				Venue: McGovern Park

1 November 2020 Quarter-final	Leitrim	0–10 (10) – (21) 2–15	Mayo	Carrick-on-Shannon
13:15 GMT (UTC+0)		(HT: 0-06 – 1-06)		Venue: Páirc Seán Mac Diarmada
	Pts: K Beirne 5 (5f), C Dolan 1, S Quinn 1, E Sweeney 1, D Flynn 1, D Casey 1.	Report	Gls: C O'Connor 1, T Conroy 1. Pts: C O'Connor 9 (4f, 2 ’45), A O'Shea 2, B Walsh 1, M Runae 1, J Carr 1, C Loftus 1.	Referee: Paul Faloon (Down); Attendance: 0 TV: RTÉ News Now

== Semi-finals ==
=== Summary ===
Div	Team 1	Score	Team 2	Div
1	Galway	w/o - conc	Sligo	4
2	Roscommon	0-13 - 1-16	Mayo	1

=== Matches ===
7 November 2020 Semi-final	Galway	w/o – scr	Sligo	Galway
				Venue: Pearse Stadium

8 November 2020 Semi-final	Roscommon	0–13 (13) – (19) 1–16	Mayo	Roscommon
13:30 GMT (UTC±0)		(HT: 0-05 – 1-08)		Venue: Dr Hyde Park
	Pts: C Cox 2 (1m, 1f), C McKeon 2 (2f), D Smith 3 (1f); D Murtagh 2; N Daly 1, T O'Rourke 1.	Report	Gls: D O'Connor 1 Pts: C O'Connor 9 (6f); P Durcan 2; A O'Shea 1, T Conroy 1, K McLoughlin 1, C Loftus 1, D O'Connor 1.	Referee: David Gough (Meath); Attendance: 0 TV: RTÉ

== Final ==
RTÉ

15 November 2020
13:30 GMT (UTC+0)
Final

Report

Galway	0-13 (13) – (14) 0-14	Mayo
(HT: 0-05 - 0-08)
Pts: S Walsh 7 (4f), P Conroy 3, D Conneely 1, P Kelly 1, G O'Donnell 1.		Pts: C O'Connor 4 (2f), T Conroy 3, M Ruane 2, B Walsh 2, P Durcan 1, D O’Connor 1, R O'Donoghue 1.

Pearse Stadium, Galway
Referee: Sean Hurson (Tyrone)
Attendance: 0

== Miscellaneous ==
- Sligo, London and New York withdrew due to the COVID-19 pandemic, Sligo for one year, London and New York for two years each.
- The competition featured the smallest number of teams since 1952.
- The postponement of the planned New York vs Galway and London vs Roscommon fixtures meant that they would not be fulfilled until 2025, having last been played in 2015.
- The cancellation of the Galway vs Sligo semi-final prevented the teams meeting for a third year in a row. They did not meet in Championship again until 2023.

== See also ==
- 2020 All-Ireland Senior Football Championship
  - 2020 Leinster Senior Football Championship
  - 2020 Munster Senior Football Championship
  - 2020 Ulster Senior Football Championship
- Impact of the COVID-19 pandemic on Gaelic games
