= 2016 Connacht Senior Football Championship =

2016 Connacht SFC
Tournament details
- Year: 2016

Winners
- Champions: Galway (45th win)
- Manager: Kevin Walsh
- Captain: Gary O'Donnell

Runners-up
- Runners-up: Roscommon
- Manager: Kevin McStay; Fergal O'Donnell
- Captain: Ciarán Murtagh

The 2016 Connacht Senior Football Championship was the 117th installment of the annual Connacht Senior Football Championship held under the auspices of Connacht GAA. It is one of the four provincial competitions of the 2016 All-Ireland Senior Football Championship. Mayo entered the competition as defending champions but were beaten by Galway in the semi-finals. Galway went on to win their first title in eight years by beating Roscommon after a replay.

== Teams ==
The Connacht championship is contested by the five counties in the Irish province of Connacht and the two foreign based teams of London and New York.

Team	Colours	Sponsor	Manager	Captain	Most recent success
Team	Colours	Sponsor	Manager	Captain	All-Ireland	Provincial
Galway	Maroon and white	Supermac's	Kevin Walsh	Gary O'Donnell	2001	2008
Leitrim	Green and gold	The Bush Hotel	Shane Ward	Gary Reynolds		1994
London	Green and white	Clayton Hotels	Ciarán Deely	David McGreevy
Mayo	Green and red	Elverys Sports	Stephen Rochford	Cillian O'Connor	1951	2015
New York	Red, white and blue	Navillus Contracting	Justin O'Halloran	Johnny Duane
Roscommon	Blue and yellow	Club Rossie	Kevin McStay; Fergal O'Donnell	Ciarán Murtagh	1944	2010
Sligo	Black and white	AbbVie Inc.	Niall Carew	Mark Breheny		2007

== Bracket ==
Preliminary round
New York	0-17
Roscommon	1-15

Quarter-finals
Roscommon	1-21
Leitrim	0-11
London	0-9
Mayo	2-16

Semi-finals
Roscommon	4-16
Sligo	2-13
Mayo	0-12
Galway	1-12

Final
Roscommon (R)	1-10; 0-14
Galway (R)	0-13; 3-16

== Fixtures ==
=== Preliminary round ===
1 May 2016
15:00 PM
Preliminary round

New York	0-17 – 1-15	Roscommon
D Freeman (0-5), B Connor (0-4), L Loughlin, P McNeice (0-3 each), K Connolly, B Gallagher (0-1 each)	Report	C Murtagh (1-3), F Cregg (0-4), C Devaney (0-3), D Murtagh (0-2), C Connolly, C Cregg, S Kilbride (0-1 each)

Gaelic Park, New York City
Attendance: 2,500
Referee: Maurice Deegan (Laois)

=== Quarter-finals ===
22 May 2016
15:30
Quarter Final

Leitrim	0-11 – 1-21	Roscommon
K Conlan, E Mulligan (0-3 each), A Croal, R Kennedy, K McHugh, N O’Donnell, D Wrynn (0-1 each)	Report	C Devaney (1-1), F Cregg (0-4), C Murtagh, D Shine (0-3 each), C Cregg, N Daly, R Daly, D Murtagh (0-2 each), C McHugh, C Shine (0-1 each)

Pairc Sean Mac Diarmada, Carrick-on-Shannon
Attendance: 8,157
Referee: Barry Cassidy (Derry)
29 May 2016
15:00
Quarter-Final

London	0-09 – 2-16	Mayo
A Moyles (0-4), L Gavaghan (0-2), S Conroy, M Gottsche, E Murray (0-1 each)	Report	E Regan (0-7), C Loftus (1-2), J Doherty (1-0), A Moran (0-2), S Coen, A Dillon, R Hennelly, K McLoughlin, A O’Shea (0-1 each)

Emerald GAA Grounds, Ruislip
Attendance: 5,000
Referee: Derek O’Mahony (Tipperary)

=== Semi-finals ===
12 June 2016
16:00
Semi-Final

Roscommon	4-16 – 2-13	Sligo
C Murtagh (2-2), E Smith (1-1), S Kilbride (1-0), C Devaney, D Keenan (0-3 each), D Shine, D Smith (0-2 each), G Claffey, F Cregg, J McManus (0-1 each)	Report	A Marren (1-3), P Hughes (0-5), Kyle Cawley (1-0), M Breheny (0-3), N Murphy (0-2)

Dr. Hyde Park, Roscommon
Attendance: 8,338
Referee: Joe McQuillan (Cavan)
18 June 2016
19:00
Semi-Final

Mayo	0-12 – 1-12	Galway
C O’Connor (0-6), C Boyle, T Parsons, L Keegan, S Coen, J Doherty, E Regan (0-1 each)	Report	G Sice (0-4), T Flynn (1-0), E Brannigan (0-3), P Conroy (0-2), S Walsh, J Heaney, D Cummins (0-1 each)

McHale Park, Castlebar
Attendance: 21,784
Referee: Conor Lane (Cork)

=== Final ===
10 July 2016; 14:00; Final	Galway	0-13 – 1-10	Roscommon	Pearse Stadium, Galway; Attendance: 24,324; Referee: Conor Lane (Cork); Man of the Match: Sean Mullooly (Strokestown)
10 July 2016; 14:00; Final	Danny Cummins 0-3, Gary Sice (0-2f) and Damien Comer 0-2 each, Bernard Power (1 '45), Gareth Bradshaw, Gary O'Donnell, Paul Conroy (0-1f), Johnny Heaney, Adrian Varley 0-1 each	Report	Enda Smith 1-0, Niall Daly, Fintan Cregg (0-1f), Ciaran Murtagh (0-1f) 0-2 each, Darren O'Malley (1 '45), Conor Devaney, Cathal Cregg, Donie Smith (0-1f) 0-1 each	Pearse Stadium, Galway; Attendance: 24,324; Referee: Conor Lane (Cork); Man of the Match: Sean Mullooly (Strokestown)

17 July 2016; 15:30; Final replay	Galway	3-16 – 0-14	Roscommon	McHale Park, Castlebar; Attendance: 15,960; Referee: Ciaran Branagan (Down); Man of the Match: Damien Comer (Annaghdown)
17 July 2016; 15:30; Final replay	Danny Cummins 2-1, Gary Sice 1-2 (0-2f), Damien Comer and Shane Walsh (0-2f) 0-3 each, Eamonn Brannigan 0-2, Bernard Power (1 '45), Eoghan Kerin, Gary O'Donnell, Paul Conroy, Paul Varley 0-1 each	Report	Ciaran Murtagh 0-4 (0-1f), Senan Kilbride, Enda Smith, Donie Shine 0-2 each, Cathal Cregg, Fergal Lennon, Thomas Corcoran, Ultan Harney 0-1 each	McHale Park, Castlebar; Attendance: 15,960; Referee: Ciaran Branagan (Down); Man of the Match: Damien Comer (Annaghdown)

== Miscellaneous ==
- Due to the impact of the COVID-19 pandemic on Gaelic games in 2021, this was the last time that Mayo could play London and Roscommon could host New York until 2026.

== See also ==
- 2016 All-Ireland Senior Football Championship
  - 2016 Leinster Senior Football Championship
  - 2016 Munster Senior Football Championship
  - 2016 Ulster Senior Football Championship
