= 2000–01 National Football League (Ireland) =

Gaelic football competition

League details
- Dates: 5 November 2000 – 29 April 2001
- Teams: 33

League champions
- Winners: Mayo (11th win)
- Captain: Noel Connelly
- Manager: Pat Holmes

League runners-up
- Runners-up: Galway
- Captain: Gary Fahey
- Manager: John O'Mahony

Other division winners
- Division 2: Westmeath

The 2000–01 Irish National Football League (NFL), known for sponsorship reasons as the Church & General National Football League, was the 70th staging of the National Football League, an annual Gaelic football tournament for the Gaelic Athletic Association county teams of Ireland.

Mayo beat Galway in the final. In Division 2 Westmeath beat Cork in the final.

== Format ==
Teams play in two divisions.

== Results ==
=== Division 1 ===
==== Division 1A Table ====
Compete in Division 1 semi-finals Automatic relegation to Division 2A

Team	Pld	W	D	L	F	A	Average	Pts
Galway	7	5	1	1	4-86	4-66	1.256	11
Roscommon	7	4	1	2	4-75	5-73	0.988	9
Tyrone	7	4	0	3	5-67	2-53	1.389	8
Offaly	7	3	2	2	4-69	2-69	1.080	8
Dublin	7	3	0	4	3-60	4-66	0.884	6
Donegal	7	2	1	4	3-75	2-80	0.977	5
Kerry	7	2	0	5	6-64	7-86	0.766	4
Louth	7	1	1	5	3-57	7-65	0.767	3

==== Division 1B Table ====
Compete in Division 1 semi-finals Automatic relegation to Division 2B

Team	Pld	W	D	L	F	A	Average	Pts
Mayo	7	5	2	0	5-88	5-57	1.430	12
Sligo	7	4	1	2	5-70	6-59	1.104	9
Derry	7	3	2	2	8-70	6-76	1.000	8
Cavan	7	3	1	3	10-65	8-70	1.012	7
Fermanagh	7	3	1	3	8-57	7-68	0.900	7
Clare	7	2	1	4	6-64	6-75	0.882	5
Laois	7	2	1	4	3-72	7-73	0.861	5
Meath	7	1	1	5	7-66	7-74	0.916	3

=== Finals ===
29 April 2001
Final

Mayo	0-13 – 0-12	Galway
J Gill 0-3 (2f); N Connelly, R Loftus (2f), M Sheridan (f, '45') 0-2 each; C McManamon, D McDonagh, S Carolan, M McNicholas 0-1 each		J. Donnellan 0-4 (2f); P Joyce 0-3 (2f); D Savage, M Donnellan 0-2 each; S Walsh 0-1

Croke Park, Dublin
Attendance: 22,623
Referee: Niall Barrett (Cork)
