= 2019 Connacht Senior Football Championship =

2019 Connacht SFC
Tournament details
- Year: 2019
- Trophy: J. J. Nestor Cup

Winners
- Champions: Roscommon (23rd win)
- Manager: Anthony Cunningham
- Captain: Enda Smith

Runners-up
- Runners-up: Galway
- Manager: Kevin Walsh
- Captain: Damien Comer

The 2019 Connacht Senior Football Championship was the 120th installment of the annual Connacht Senior Football Championship organised by Connacht GAA. It was one of the four provincial competitions of the 2019 All-Ireland Senior Football Championship. As of 2018, the competition winners advanced to the "All-Ireland Super 8s".

The draw for the 2019 Connacht Championship was made on 12 October 2018.

The winners receive the J. J. Nestor Cup, named after J. J. Nestor of Quinaltagh, County Galway. For a fourth year in a row, the final was contested between Galway and Roscommon. Roscommon were the winners of the championship, defeating Galway at Pearse Stadium in Salthill by 1-13 to 0-12.

== Teams ==
The Connacht championship is contested by the five counties in the Irish province of Connacht plus London and New York.

Team	Colours	Sponsor	Manager	Captain	Most recent success
Team	Colours	Sponsor	Manager	Captain	All-Ireland	Provincial
Galway	Maroon and white	Supermac's	Kevin Walsh	Damien Comer	2001	2018
Leitrim	Green and gold	J.P Clarke's New York	Terry Hyland	Micheal McWeeney		1994
London	Green and white	Clayton Hotels	Ciarán Deely	Liam Gavaghan
Mayo	Green and red	Elverys Sports	James Horan	Diarmuid O'Connor	1951	2015
New York	Red, white and blue	Navillus Contracting	Justin O'Halloran	Tom Cunniffe
Roscommon	Blue and yellow	Ballymore Properties	Anthony Cunningham	Enda Smith	1944	2017
Sligo	Black and white	AbbVie Inc.	Paul Taylor	Niall Murphy		2007

== Bracket ==
The Connacht county teams play London and New York on a rotational basis. The match involving New York was a quarter-final in 2019 – it was last a preliminary game in 2017.

Quarter-finals, May 5 and 12
New York	0-04
Mayo	1-22
Leitrim	0-12
Roscommon	3-17
London	1-9
Galway	0-16

Semi-finals, May 19 and 25
Mayo	0-17
Roscommon	2-12
Sligo	0-7
Galway	3-11

Final, June 16
Roscommon	1-13
Galway	0-12

== Matches ==
=== Quarter Finals ===
5 May 2019; Quarter Final	New York	0-4 - 1-22	Mayo	Gaelic Park, New York
5 May 2019; Quarter Final		Report		Gaelic Park, New York

12 May 2019; Quarter Final	Leitrim	0-12 - 3-17	Roscommon	Dr Hyde Park
12 May 2019; Quarter Final		Report		Dr Hyde Park

5 May 2019; Quarter Final	London	1-9 - 0-16	Galway	McGovern Park, Ruislip
5 May 2019; Quarter Final		Report		McGovern Park, Ruislip

=== Semi Finals ===
25 May 2019; Semi Final	Mayo	0-17 - 2-12	Roscommon	MacHale Park, Castlebar
25 May 2019; Semi Final		Report		MacHale Park, Castlebar

19 May 2019; Semi Final	Sligo	0-7 - 3-11	Galway	Markievicz Park, Sligo
19 May 2019; Semi Final		Report		Markievicz Park, Sligo

=== Final ===
16 June 2019; 16:00; Final	Galway	0-12 - 1-13	Roscommon	Pearse Stadium, Galway; Attendance: 17,639; Referee: Barry Cassidy (Derry); Man of the Match: David Murray (Padraig Pearses)
16 June 2019; 16:00; Final	Shane Walsh 0-4 (0-2f, 1 '45), Michael Daly 0-3 (0-1f), Antaine Ó Laoi 0-2, Gareth Bradshaw, Fiontán Ó Curraoin, Eamonn Brannigan 0-1 each	Report	Diarmuid Murtagh 1-3 (0-2f), Conor Cox 0-5 (0-2f), Niall Daly, Ronan Daly, Shane Killoran, Conor Devaney, Niall Kilroy 0-1 each	Pearse Stadium, Galway; Attendance: 17,639; Referee: Barry Cassidy (Derry); Man of the Match: David Murray (Padraig Pearses)

== See also ==
- 2019 All-Ireland Senior Football Championship
  - 2019 Leinster Senior Football Championship
  - 2019 Munster Senior Football Championship
  - 2019 Ulster Senior Football Championship
