= 2015 Connacht Senior Football Championship =

2015 Connacht SFC
Tournament details
- Year: 2015

Winners
- Champions: Mayo (46th win)
- Manager: Noel Connelly; Pat Holmes
- Captain: Keith Higgins

Runners-up
- Runners-up: Sligo
- Manager: Niall Carew
- Captain: Adrian Marren

The 2015 Connacht Senior Football Championship was the 116th instalment of the annual Connacht Senior Football Championship held under the auspices of Connacht GAA. It was one of four provincial competitions in the 2015 All-Ireland Senior Football Championship. Mayo entered the competition as defending Connacht champions and retained the title after a 6-25 to 2-11 win against Sligo in the final on 19 July.

The draw to decide the fixtures was made on 10 October 2014. As in previous competitions, the opponents of London and New York in the opening round were decided in advance. The teams that visit the 'Exiles' are chosen on a cyclical basis. As in the 2010 Connacht Championship, Roscommon faced London and Galway faced New York. Mayo and Sligo were drawn straight into the semi-final stage.

Under GAA rules introduced in 2014 to allow counties to more easily predict the dates of their qualifier matches, the two sides of the draw were named as either A or B. London, Roscommon and Sligo were named on the A side of the draw, while Galway, Leitrim, Mayo and New York's draw was named as the B side. New York, as in previous seasons did not compete in the All-Ireland qualifiers.

Note due to COVID-19 it would be Galway playing New York and Roscommon for London last games to be held were cancelled in the 2020 championship but now there are rotational fixtures took place in 2025.

== Teams ==
The Connacht championship is contested by the five counties in the Irish province of Connacht and the two foreign based teams of London and New York.

Team	Colours	Sponsor	Manager	Captain	Most recent success
Team	Colours	Sponsor	Manager	Captain	All-Ireland	Provincial
Galway	Maroon and white	Supermac's	Kevin Walsh	Paul Conroy	2001	2008
Leitrim	Green and gold	The Bush Hotel	Shane Ward	Danny Beck		1994
London	Green and white	Moran's Hotels	Paul Coggins	Martin Carroll
Mayo	Green and red	Elverys Sports	Noel Connelly; Pat Holmes	Keith Higgins	1951	2014
New York	Red, white and blue	Navillus Contracting	Ian Galvin	Keith Scally
Roscommon	Blue and Yellow	Club Rossie	John Evans	Niall Carty	1944	2010
Sligo	Black and white	Radisson Blu, Sligo	Niall Carew	Mark Breheny		2007

== Bracket ==
Preliminary round
New York	0-08
Galway	2-18

Quarter-finals
London	0-10
Roscommon	1-14
Galway	1-13
Leitrim	0-08

Semi-finals
Roscommon	0-13
Sligo	1-14
Galway	2-08
Mayo	1-15

Final
Sligo	2-11
Mayo	6-25

== Fixtures ==
=== Preliminary round ===
3 May 2015
8.00pm (Irish time)
Preliminary round

New York	0-08 – 2-18	Galway
PJ Banville (0-07), JJ Matthews (0-01)	Report	D. Comer, S. Walsh (1-04 each), P. Ó Gríofa, L. Silke, S. Denvir, F. Ó Curraoin, P. Conroy, D. Cummins, M. Martin (0-01 each)

Gaelic Park, New York City
Referee: Ciaran Branagan (Down)

=== Quarter-finals ===
17 May 2015
3.30pm
Quarter-Final

Leitrim	0-8 – 1-13	Galway
K. Conlon (0-03), S. McWeeney (0-02), F. Clancy, R. Kennedy, P. McGowan (0-01 each)	Report	P. Conroy (0-06), D. Comer (1-01), D Cummins (0-02), G. O'Donnel, M. Lundy, P. Óg Ó Gríofa, P. Sweeney (0-01 each)

Páirc Seán Mac Diarmada, Carrick-on-Shannon
Referee: Anthony Nolan (Wicklow)

24 May 2015
3.00pm
Quarter-Final

London	0-10 – 1-14	Roscommon
Ciaran Murtagh 1-2, Enda Smith 0-4, Cathal Shine 0-2, Donie Shine 0-2(2f), Diarmuid Murtagh 0-2, Ian Kilbride 0-1, Ultan Harney 0-1.	Report	Lorcan Mulvey 0-8(5f), Adrain Moyles 0-1(1f), Alan O’ Hara(0-1)

Emerald GAA Grounds, Ruislip
Referee: E Kinsella (Laois)

=== Semi-finals ===
14 June 2015
4.00pm
Semi-Final

Mayo	1-15 - 2-8	Galway
C O'Connor 0-9 (8fs), F Hanley 1-0 (og), A Moran 0-2, J Doherty, A O'Shea, M Ronaldson, S O'Shea 0-1 each.	Report	G Sice 1-3 (0-2fs), D Cummins 1-1, P Conroy 0-3 (3fs), D Comer 0-1.

Pearse Stadium
Attendance: 20,254
Referee: P Hughes (Armagh)

20 June 2015
7.00pm
Semi-Final

Sligo	1-14 - 0-13	Roscommon
Adrian Marren 1-7, Cian Breheny, David Kelly, Mark Breheny 0-2 each, Pat Hughes 0-1.	Report	Cathal Cregg 0-3, Ciaran Cafferkey, Enda Smith, Ciaráin Murtagh 0-2 each, Niall Daly, Donal Smith, Finbar Cregg 0-1 each.

Markievicz Park
Referee: Maurice Deegan (Laois)

=== Final ===
19 July 2015; 4:00 PM; Final	Mayo	6-25 - 2-11	Sligo	Dr. Hyde Park, Roscommon; Attendance: 23,196; Referee: Padraig O'Sullivan (Kerry); Man of the Match: Aidan O'Shea (Breaffy)
19 July 2015; 4:00 PM; Final	Aidan O'Shea 3-4, Cillian O'Connor 1-7 (0-5f, 1 '45), Diarmuid O'Connor 0-4, Lee Keegan and Seamus O'Shea 1-0 each, Jason Doherty 0-3, Donal Vaughan and Mark Ronaldson 0-2 each, Patrick Durcan, Barry Moran, Alan Dillon 0-1 each	Report	Mark Breheny 0-4 (0-2f), Brendan Egan and Pat Hughes 1-0 each, Adrian Marren 0-3, Cian Breheny, Niall Murphy, Neil Ewing, Eoin McHugh 0-1 each	Dr. Hyde Park, Roscommon; Attendance: 23,196; Referee: Padraig O'Sullivan (Kerry); Man of the Match: Aidan O'Shea (Breaffy)

== Miscellaneous ==
- Due to the impact of the COVID-19 pandemic on Gaelic games in 2020, it took an extra 5 years for Roscommon vs London and Galway vs New York to take place again.

== See also ==
- 2015 All-Ireland Senior Football Championship
  - 2015 Leinster Senior Football Championship
  - 2015 Munster Senior Football Championship
  - 2015 Ulster Senior Football Championship
