= 2018 Connacht Senior Football Championship =

2018 Connacht SFC
Tournament details
- Year: 2018
- Trophy: J. J. Nestor Cup

Winners
- Champions: Galway (46th win)
- Manager: Kevin Walsh
- Captain: Damien Comer

Runners-up
- Runners-up: Roscommon
- Manager: Kevin McStay
- Captain: Conor Devaney

Other
- Top Scorer: Shane Walsh (Galway); 16 points (0-16)

The 2018 Connacht Senior Football Championship was the 119th installment of the annual Connacht Senior Football Championship organised by Connacht GAA. It is one of the four provincial competitions of the 2018 All-Ireland Senior Football Championship. Unlike previous seasons, where the Connacht champions earned a place in the quarter-finals, this year's winners advanced to the new "All-Ireland Super 8s".

The draw for the Connacht Championship was made on 19 October 2017. Details on dates for the fixtures were announced on 31 October 2017.

The winners receive the J. J. Nestor Cup, named after J. J. Nestor of Quinaltagh, County Galway. Galway were the winners of the championship, defeating Roscommon in the final.

== Teams ==
The Connacht championship is contested by the five counties in the Irish province of Connacht plus London and New York. Sligo are the only team to come into the new season under a new manager, with Cathal Corey having replaced Niall Carew. In December 2017, Corey appointed Kevin McDonnell as the new Sligo captain. Roscommon and Galway likewise come into the competition under new captains. Kevin McStay appointed Conor Devaney in place of Ciaráin Murtagh during the winter break, while Damien Comer was named as the new Tribesmen skipper for their league campaign, replacing Gary O'Donnell. New York named Tom Cunniffe, a former All-Ireland finalist with Mayo, as their captain.

Team	Colours	Sponsor	Manager	Captain	Most recent success
Team	Colours	Sponsor	Manager	Captain	All-Ireland	Provincial
Galway	Maroon and white	Supermac's	Kevin Walsh	Damien Comer	2001	2016
Leitrim	Green and gold	The Bush Hotel	Brendan Guckian	Donal Wrynn		1994
London	Green and white	Clayton Hotels	Ciarán Deely	Liam Gavaghan
Mayo	Green and red	Elverys Sports	Stephen Rochford	Cillian O'Connor	1951	2015
New York	Red, white and blue	Navillus Contracting	Justin O'Halloran	Tom Cunniffe
Roscommon	Blue and yellow	Club Rossie	Kevin McStay	Conor Devaney	1944	2017
Sligo	Black and white	AbbVie Inc.	Cathal Corey	Kevin McDonnell		2007

== Bracket ==
Quarter-finals
New York	1-15
Leitrim (a.e.t.)	0-19
London	1-11
Sligo	1-21
Mayo	0-12
Galway	1-12

Semi-finals
Leitrim	0-10
Roscommon	0-24
Sligo	1-12
Galway	4-24

Final
Roscommon	2-06
Galway	0-16

== Fixtures ==
=== Quarter-finals ===
6 May 2018
3:30 pm
Quarter-Final B

Report

London	1-11 (14) – (24) 1-21	Sligo
(HT: 1-3 – 1-10)
Gls: A Marren 1 (pen); Pts: A Marren 6 (1f), C Henry 3, S Carrabine, S Coen, N Murphy 2 each, C Breheny, A Devaney (f), L Gaughan, P Hughes, E McHugh, P O’Connor 1 each		Gls: F McMahon 1 Pts: L Gavaghan 5 (2f), L Irwin 2 (1f), R Elliott, M Gottsche, F McMahon, E Murray 1 each

McGovern Park, Ruislip
Referee: Barry Cassidy (Derry)

6 May 2018
7:15 pm IST
15:15 EDT (UTC-4)
Quarter-Final A

Report

New York	1-15 (18) – (19) 0-19 (a.e.t.)	Leitrim
(HT: 1-5 – 0-9)
Gls: S Hogan 1 Pts: J Clarke 5, K O’Grady 3, T Donnelly 3, N Collins, D Culhane, L Kelly, D McKenna 1 each		Pts: K Beirne 7, E Mulligan 3, R O’Rourke 2, S Quinn 2, M Plunkett, D Rooney, D McGovern, A Flynn, N Plunkett 1 each

Gaelic Park, New York
Referee: Derek O'Mahony (Tipperary)
Attendance: 4,500

RTÉ

13 May 2018
4:00 pm
Quarter-Final C

Report

Mayo	0-12 (12) – (15) 1-12	Galway
(HT: 0-6 – 0-7)
Pts: C. Loftus 3 (3f), A. Moran 02, C. O’Connor 2 (1f), K. McLoughlin 2, D. O’Connor 1, K. Higgins 1, T. Parsons 1		Gls: J. Heaney 1 Pts: S. Walsh 3 (1f), D. Comer 2, B. McHugh 2 (2f), C. Duggan 2, T. Flynn 1, S. Armstrong 1, S. Kelly 1

MacHale Park, Castlebar
Referee: Conor Lane (Cork)
Attendance: 29,449

=== Semi-finals ===
26 May 2018
5:30 pm
Semi-Final

Report

Leitrim	0-10 (10) – (24) 0-24	Roscommon
(HT: 0-2 – 0-9)
Pts: D Moran 3, D Rooney 2, K Beirne 2 (1f), R O’Rourke 1, E Mulligan 1 (’45), S Quinn 1		Pts: D Murtagh 5 (2f), C Cregg 4, C Murtagh 3 (1f), D Smith 2, E Smith 2, C Devaney 1, C Compton 1, N Kilroy 1, F Cregg 1, B Stack 1, S Killoran 1, J McManus 1, T O’Rourke 1

Páirc Seán Mac Diarmada, Carrick-on-Shannon
Referee: Joe McQuillan (Cavan)
Attendance: 8,265

3 June 2018
3:30 pm
Semi-Final

Report

Galway	4-24 (36) – (15) 1-12	Sligo
(HT: 1-15 – 0-6)
Gls: D Comer 2, I Burke 1, S Kelly 1 Pts: S Walsh 5 (1f), E Brannigan 3, B McHugh 3 (2f), D Comer 2, I Burke 2, S Kelly 2, J Heaney 2, P Cooke 2, P Sweeney 1, G O'Donnell 1, F Burke 1		Gls: K Cawley 1 Pts: A Marren 4 (1f), L Gaughan 3 (2f), K Cawley 2, N Murphy 2, P Hughes 1

Pearse Stadium, Salthill
Referee: Noel Mooney (Cavan)
Attendance: 8,171

=== Final ===
17 June 2018; 16:00; Connacht Final	Roscommon	2-6 - 0-16	Galway	Dr. Hyde Park, Roscommon; Attendance: 18,864; Referee: David Coldrick (Meath); Man of the Match: Shane Walsh (Kilkerrin-Clonberne)
17 June 2018; 16:00; Connacht Final	Diarmuid Murtagh 0-5 (0-2f), Ciaráin Murtagh and Conor Devaney (1-0 pen) 1-0 each, Donie Smith 0-1	Report	Shane Walsh 0-8 (0-5f), Ian Burke 0-3, Damien Comer 0-2, Sean Kelly, Sean Armstrong, Adrian Varley 0-1 each	Dr. Hyde Park, Roscommon; Attendance: 18,864; Referee: David Coldrick (Meath); Man of the Match: Shane Walsh (Kilkerrin-Clonberne)

== See also ==
- 2018 All-Ireland Senior Football Championship
  - 2018 Leinster Senior Football Championship
  - 2018 Munster Senior Football Championship
  - 2018 Ulster Senior Football Championship
