= Connacht Senior Football Championship =

Annual Gaelic football competition played on two continents

- Current season or competition: 2026 Connacht Senior Football Championship
- Irish: Craobh Sinsir Peile Connachta
- Code: Gaelic football
- Founded: 1888; 138 years ago
- Region: Connacht (GAA)
- No. of teams: 7
- Title holders: Roscommon (25th title)
- Most titles: Galway (51 titles)
- Sponsors: SuperValu, Allianz, AIB
- TV partner: RTÉ
- Motto: Experience The Unforgettable
- Official website: Official website

The Connacht Senior Football Championship, known simply as the Connacht Championship and shortened to Connacht SFC, is an annual Gaelic football competition for the senior county teams of Connacht GAA. All of the county teams of Connacht participate in the championship, as well as London and New York. The winning team receives the Nestor Cup.

The Connacht SFC is run on a knock-out basis through which teams are eliminated from the competition. A series of games are played during the summer months and the final is played in June or July. The winner and runner-up progresses directly to the All-Ireland SFC Group Stage. Before 2020, all losing teams progressed to the All-Ireland SFC Qualifiers, while, prior to 2001, the All-Ireland SFC was a straight knock-out format, which meant all losing teams were eliminated after a single defeat.

Roscommon defeated the reigning champions Galway on a scoreline of 3–21 to 2–22 in the 2026 final at Dr. Hyde Park.

== History ==
Galway are Connacht's most successful county, with 51 Connacht SFC titles and 9 All-Ireland SFC titles. Mayo are next, with 47 Connacht SFC titles and 3 All-Ireland SFC titles. Roscommon have won the Connacht SFC title 25 times, most recently in 2026, as well having won 2 All-Ireland SFC titles. Apart from those three, no other team competing in Connacht has won an All-Ireland SFC title.

Sligo have won the Nestor Cup three times, most recently in 2007. Leitrim have won the competition twice, most recently in 1994.

London have competed in the Connacht SFC since 1975, while New York joined in 1999. In this time London have managed three victories: one in 1977 and two in 2013, against Sligo and Leitrim. New York recorded their first, and, so far, only, victory in the championship over Leitrim in 2023.

The competing counties play for the JJ Nestor Cup, which is presented to the winning captain on Connacht Final Day.

=== Connacht SFC moments ===
- Leitrim 0–12 – 2–4 Mayo (24 July 1994):
- Sligo 1–10 – 0–12 Galway (8 July 2007):
- Mayo 5–11 – 0–10 London (21 July 2013):
- New York 0–15 pen – 0–15 Leitrim (8 April 2023):

== Teams ==
=== 2026 Championship ===
Seven counties will compete in the 2026 Connacht Senior Football Championship: the five counties in the Irish province of Connacht and the two foreign-based teams of London and New York.

County team	Location	Stadium	Province	Pos. 2024	Champ. titles	Last champ. title	All-Ire. titles	Last All-Ire. title
Galway	Galway	Pearse Stadium	Connacht	Winner	51	2025	9	2001
Leitrim	Carrick-on-Shannon	Páirc Seán Mac Diarmada	Connacht	Semi-finalist	2	1994	0	—N/a
London	South Ruislip	McGovern Park	Britain	Quarter-finalist	0	—N/a	0	—N/a
Mayo	Castlebar	MacHale Park	Connacht	Finalist	47	2021	3	2026
New York	Bronx	Gaelic Park	North America	Quarter-finalist	0	—N/a	0	—N/a
Roscommon	Roscommon	Dr Hyde Park	Connacht	Semi-finalist	24	2026	2	1944
Sligo	Sligo	Markievicz Park	Connacht	Quarter-finalist	3	2007	0	—N/a

=== List of teams ===
The following teams have competed in the Connacht SFC for at least one season.

Team	App.	Debut	Most recent	Connacht SFC titles	Last Connacht SFC title	Best Connacht SFC result
Galway	—	1900	2025	51	2025	Winner
Leitrim	—	1906	2025	2	1994	Winner
London	—	1975	2025	0	—	Runner-up
Mayo	—	1901	2025	47	2021	Winner
New York	25	1999	2025	0	—	Semi-finalist
Roscommon	—	1901	2025	24	2019	Winner
Sligo	—	1905	2025	3	2007	Winner

=== Personnel and kits ===
County team	Manager	Captain(s)	Sponsors
Galway	Pádraic Joyce	John Maher	Supermac's
Leitrim	Steven Poacher	Ryan O'Rourke	Gallagher Group
London	Michael Maher	Liam Gallagher	Clayton Hotel
Mayo	Andy Moran	Jack Coyne	Intersport Elverys
New York	Ronan McGinley	Rob Wharton	Navillus
Roscommon	Mark Dowd	Diarmuid Murtagh	Ballymore
Sligo	Eamonn O'Hara; Dessie Sloyan	Niall Murphy; Canice Mulligan	AbbVie

== List of finals ==
=== Legend ===
All-Ireland SFC winner
All-Ireland SFC runner-up

=== List of Connacht SFC finals ===
Year	Date	Winner		Runner-up		Venue	Winning captain	Winning margin	Referee	Attendance
Year	Date	County team	Score	County team	Score	Venue	Winning captain	Winning margin	Referee	Attendance
1900		Galway								
1901	9 November 1902	Mayo	2-04	Galway	0-03	Claremorris		7		
1902		Galway								
1903	23 April 1905	Roscommon	1-02	Mayo	0-04	Claremorris		1		
1904	23 April 1905	Mayo	3-06	Roscommon	0-01	Claremorris		14		
1905	27 May 1906	Roscommon	0-07	Mayo	0-05	Tuam		2		
1906	7 April 1907	Mayo	2-13	Roscommon	0-05	Claremorris		14		
1907	26 May 1908	Mayo	3-09	Galway	0-01	Tuam		17		
1908	31 January 1909	Mayo	2-05	Galway	0-04	Tuam		7		
1909	30 October 1910	Mayo	1-04	Galway	0-03	Ballina		4		
1910	6 November	Galway	1-03	Roscommon	1-02	Athlone		2		
1911	24 September	Galway	won	Mayo	scr	Claremorris				
1912	15 September	Roscommon	0-02	Galway	0-00	Castlerea		2		
1913	28 September	Galway	1-02	Mayo	0-03	Castlerea		2		
1914	17 October 1915	Roscommon	1-02	Leitrim	0-01	Boyle		4		
1915	26 September	Mayo	3-01	Roscommon	1-03	Castlerea		1		
1916	1 October	Mayo	1-05	Roscommon	0-03	Castlerea		5		
1917	7 October	Galway	1-04	Mayo	1-01	Castlerea		4		
1918	22 September	Mayo	0-04	Galway	0-01	Castlerea		3		
1919	3 August	Galway	1-06	Roscommon	0-05	Tuam		4		
1920	22 August	Mayo	2-03	Sligo	1-04	Castlerea		2		
1921	25 March 1923	Mayo	1-04	Roscommon	0-01	Castlerea		7		
1922	2 September 1923; 30 September 1923	Galway	1-07; 2-04 *	Sligo	3-02; 2-02	Tuam; Croke Park		2		
1923	4 May 1924	Mayo	0-03	Galway	0-02	Tuam		1		
1924	19 October; 9 November	Mayo	0-01; 2-06 (R)	Galway	0-01; 0-05 (R)	Balla; Tuam		7		
1925	18 October	Galway	1-05	Mayo	1-03	Tuam		2		
1926	11 July	Galway	3-02	Mayo	1-02	Roscommon		6		
1927	7 August	Leitrim	2-04	Galway	0-03	Roscommon		7		
1928	5 August	Sligo	1-04	Mayo	0-06	Tuam		1		
1929	21 July	Mayo	1-06	Galway	0-04	Roscommon		5		
1930	10 August	Mayo	1-07	Sligo	1-02	Tuam		5		
1931	9 August	Mayo	2-10	Roscommon	3-02	Sligo		8		
1932	7 August	Mayo	2-06	Sligo	0-07	Tuam		5		
1933	23 July	Galway	1-07	Mayo	1-05	Castlerea	Michael Donnellan	2		
1934	22 July	Galway	2-04	Mayo	0-05	Castlerea	Michael Higgins	5		
1935	21 July	Mayo	0-12	Galway	0-05	Roscommon		7		
1936	19 July; 2 August	Mayo	2-04; 2-07 (R)	Galway	1-07; 1-04 (R)	St. Coman's Park	Séamus O'Malley	6		
1937	18 July	Mayo	3-05	Galway	0-08	St. Coman's Park		6		
1938	17 July	Galway	0-08	Mayo	0-05	St. Coman's Park	John "Tull" Dunne	3		
1939	16 July	Mayo	2-06 *	Galway	0-03	St. Coman's Park		9		
1940	21 July	Galway	1-07	Mayo	0-05	St. Coman's Park	John "Tull" Dunne	5		
1941	20 July	Galway	0-08	Roscommon	1-04	St. Coman's Park	Dinny O'Sullivan	1		
1942	19 July	Galway	2-06	Roscommon	3-02	Ballinasloe	Charlie Connolly	4		
1943	18 July	Roscommon	2-06	Galway	0-08	St. Coman's Park	Jimmy Murray	6		
1944	6 August	Roscommon	2-11	Mayo	1-06	Tuam	Jimmy Murray	8		
1945	22 July	Galway	2-06	Mayo	1-07	St. Coman's Park		2		
1946	21 July; 11 August	Roscommon	1-04; 1-09*	Mayo	0-06; 1-02	St. Coman's Park	Jimmy Murray	7		
1947	20 July	Roscommon	2-12	Sligo	1-08	Ballina		7		
1948	18 July; 25 July	Mayo	2-04; 2-10 (R)	Galway	1-07; 2-07 (R)	St. Coman's Park	John Forde	3		
1949	31 July	Mayo	4-06	Leitrim	0-03	St. Coman's Park		15		
1950	16 July	Mayo	1-07	Roscommon	0-04	St Jarlath's Park	Seán Flanagan	6		
1951	15 July	Mayo	4-13	Galway	2-03	St Jarlath's Park	Seán Flanagan	14		
1952	13 July	Roscommon	3-05	Mayo	0-06	MacHale Park		8		
1953	19 July	Roscommon	1-06	Mayo	0-06	St. Coman's Park		3		
1954	18 July	Galway	2-10	Sligo	3-04	St Jarlath's Park		3		
1955	17 July	Mayo	3-11	Roscommon	1-03	St Jarlath's Park		14		18,500
1956	15 July	Galway	3-12	Sligo	1-05	Markievicz Park	Jack Mangan	14	P Carroll (Offaly)	13,000
1957	14 July	Galway	4-08	Leitrim	0-04	Pearse Stadium		20		13,000
1958	13 July	Galway	2-10	Leitrim	1-11	St. Coman's Park		2		12,000
1959	9 August	Galway	5-08	Leitrim	0-12	Markievicz Park	Seán Purcell	9		18,000
1960	10 July	Galway	2-05	Leitrim	0-05	Markievicz Park		6		7,500
1961	9 July	Roscommon	1-11	Galway	2-07	MacHale Park		1		19,876
1962	22 July	Roscommon	3-07	Galway	2-09	MacHale Park	Gerry O'Malley	1		20,000
1963	14 July	Galway	4-11	Leitrim	1-08	MacHale Park	Mick Garrett	12		20,000
1964	19 July	Galway	2-12	Mayo	1-05	St Jarlath's Park	John Donnellan	10		35,000
1965	1 August	Galway	1-12	Sligo	2-06	St Jarlath's Park	Enda Colleran	3		30,000
1966	17 July	Galway	0-12	Mayo	1-08	MacHale Park	Enda Colleran	1	J Martin (Tyrone)	28,000
1967	16 July	Mayo	4-15	Leitrim	0-07	St Jarlath's Park		20	J Hatton (Wicklow)	
1968	21 July	Galway	2-10	Mayo	2-09	MacHale Park		1	P Kelly (Dublin)	30,000
1969	20 July; 3 August	Mayo	0–11; 1-11 (14)	Galway	1-08; 1-08 (11)	Pearse Stadium; MacHale Park		3	L Maguire (Cavan); J Moloney (Tipperary)	25,000
1970	12 July	Galway	2-15 (21)	Roscommon	1-08 (11)	Pearse Stadium		10	Mick Loftus (Mayo)	11,500
1971	11 July; 25 July	Galway	2–15; 1-17 (R)	Sligo	2–15; 3-10 (R)	MacHale Park	Liam Sammon	1	J Martin (Roscommon)	19,764; 20,000 (R)
1972	16 July	Roscommon	5-8	Mayo	3-10	MacHale Park		4		
1973	8 July	Galway	1-17	Mayo	2-12	MacHale Park	Liam Sammon	2	P Devlin (Tyrone)	30,000
1974	14 July	Galway	2-14	Roscommon	0-08	Pearse Stadium	Gay Mitchell	12	Mick Loftus (Mayo)	25,000
1975	6 July; 20 July	Sligo	2–10; 2-10 (R)	Mayo	1–13; 0-15 (R)	Markievicz Park; MacHale Park	Barnes Murphy	1	T Moran (Leitrim)	
1976	4 July; 18 July	Galway	1-08; 1-14 (R)	Roscommon	1-8; 0-9 (R)	MacHale Park; St Jarlath's Park		5	Mick Loftus (Mayo)	18,000; 16,000
1977	10 July	Roscommon	1-12	Galway	2-08	Dr Hyde Park		14	T Moran (Leitrim)	18,000
1978	9 July	Roscommon	2-07	Galway	0-09	Pearse Stadium		4	PJ McGrath (Mayo)	17,000
1979	15 July	Roscommon	3-15	Mayo	2-10	MacHale Park		9	P Gorman (Sligo)	23,700
1980	13 July	Roscommon	3-13	Mayo	0-08	Dr Hyde Park	Danny Murray	14	Mickey Kearins (Sligo)	17,880
1981	12 July	Mayo	0-12	Sligo	0-04	MacHale Park		8	T Cunningham (Galway)	
1982	11 July	Galway	3-17	Mayo	0-10	St Jarlath's Park	Gay McManus	16	P Gorman (Sligo)	18,000
1983	17 July	Galway	1-13	Mayo	1-10	MacHale Park	Séamus McHugh	3	S Mullaney (Roscommon)	18,000
1984	8 July	Galway	2-13	Mayo	2-09	Pearse Stadium	Séamus McHugh	4	Mickey Kearins (Sligo)	17,560
1985	14 July	Mayo	2-11	Roscommon	0-08	Dr Hyde Park		9	Mickey Kearins (Sligo)	18,000
1986	13 July	Galway	1-08	Roscommon	1-05	Dr Hyde Park	Tomás Tierney	3	P Gorman (Sligo)	13,000
1987	12 July	Galway	0-08	Mayo	0-07	MacHale Park	Val Daly	1	S Prior (Leitrim)	25,000
1988	24 July	Mayo	1-12	Roscommon	0-08	Dr Hyde Park	Dermot Flanagan	7	Mickey Kearins (Sligo)	20,000
1989	23 July; 30 July	Mayo	0–12; 3-14 (R)	Roscommon	1-09; 2-13 (R)	MacHale Park; Dr Hyde Park	Jimmy Browne	4	Mickey Kearins (Sligo)	20,000
1990	22 July	Roscommon	0-16	Galway	1-11	Dr Hyde Park	Paul Earley	2		18,000
1991	14 July; 28 July	Roscommon	0–14; 0-13 (R)	Mayo	0–14; 1-09 (R)	MacHale Park; Dr Hyde Park	John Newton	1	P Egan (Galway)	25,000; 24,000 (R)
1992	26 July	Mayo	1-14	Roscommon	0-10	MacHale Park	Peter Ford	7	S Prior (Leitrim)	30,000
1993	25 July	Mayo	1-05	Roscommon	0-07	Dr Hyde Park	Kevin Beirne	1	M Curley (Galway)	26,000
1994	24 July	Leitrim	0-12	Mayo	2-04	Dr Hyde Park	Declan Darcy	2	M Curley (Galway)	18,271
1995	23 July	Galway	0-17	Mayo	1-07	St Jarlath's Park	Jarlath Fallon	7	F Finan (Sligo)	17,000
1996	21 July	Mayo	3-09	Galway	1-11	MacHale Park	Noel Connelly	4	F Finan (Sligo)	
1997	3 August	Mayo	0-11	Sligo	1-07	Dr Hyde Park	Noel Connelly	1	M Curley (Galway)	22,000
1998	19 July; 1 August	Galway	0–11; 1-17 (R)	Roscommon	0–11; 0-17 (R)	St Jarlath's Park; Dr Hyde Park	Ray Silke	3	S Prior (Leitrim)	25,000; 30,000 (R)
1999	18 July	Mayo	1-14	Galway	1-10	St Jarlath's Park	Kenneth Mortimer	4	Brian White (Wexford)	31,000
2000	30 July	Galway	1-13	Leitrim	0-08	Dr Hyde Park	Pádraic Joyce	8	B Crowe (Cavan)	28,000
2001	1 July	Roscommon	2-10	Mayo	1-12	Dr Hyde Park	Fergal O'Donnell	1	S McCormack (Meath)	28,000
2002	30 June	Galway	1-11	Sligo	0-11	MacHale Park	Pádraic Joyce	3	J McKee (Armagh)	14,000
2003	6 July	Galway	1-14	Mayo	0-13	Pearse Stadium	Kevin Walsh	4	M Monahan (Kildare)	
2004	18 July	Mayo	2-13	Roscommon	0-09	MacHale Park	Fergal Costello	10	B White (Wexford)	34,790
2005	10 July	Galway	0-10	Mayo	0-08	Pearse Stadium	Pádraic Joyce	2	J. Gainey	29,711
2006	16 July	Mayo	0-12	Galway	1-08	MacHale Park	David Heaney	1	P. Russell (Tipperary)	34,613
2007	8 July	Sligo	1-10	Galway	0-12	Dr Hyde Park	Noel McGuire	1		11,317
2008	13 July	Galway	2-12	Mayo	1-14	MacHale Park	Pádraic Joyce	1	David Coldrick (Meath)	31,789
2009	19 July	Mayo	2-12	Galway	1-14	Pearse Stadium	Trevor Mortimer	1		25,627
2010	18 July	Roscommon	0-14	Sligo	0-13	MacHale Park	Peter Domican	1	Jimmy White (Donegal)	25,300
2011	17 July	Mayo	0-13	Roscommon	0-11	Dr Hyde Park	Alan Dillon	2	Michael Collins (Cork)	25,609
2012	15 July	Mayo	0-12	Sligo	0-10	Dr Hyde Park	Andy Moran	2	Cormac Reilly (Meath)	23,257
2013	21 July	Mayo	5-11	London	0-10	MacHale Park	Andy Moran	16	Conor Lane (Cork)	21,274
2014	13 July	Mayo	3-14	Galway	0-16	MacHale Park	Andy Moran	7	Rory Hickey (Clare)	26,738
2015	19 July	Mayo	6-25	Sligo	2-11	Dr Hyde Park	Keith Higgins	26	Padraig O'Sullivan (Kerry)	23,196
2016	10 July; 17 July	Galway	0–13; 3-16 (R)	Roscommon	1–10; 0-14(R)	Pearse Stadium; MacHale Park	Gary O'Donnell	11 (R)	Ciaran Branagan (Down)	24,324; 15,960 (R)
2017	9 July	Roscommon	2-15	Galway	0-12	Pearse Stadium	Ciarán Murtagh	9	David Gough (Meath)	18,287
2018	17 June	Galway	0-16	Roscommon	2-06	Dr Hyde Park	Damien Comer	4	David Coldrick (Meath)	18,864
2019	16 June	Roscommon	1-13	Galway	0-12	Pearse Stadium	Enda Smith	4	Barry Cassidy (Derry)	17,639
2020	15 November	Mayo	0-14	Galway	0-13	Pearse Stadium	Aidan O'Shea	1	Sean Hurson (Tyrone)	0
2021	25 July	Mayo	2-14	Galway	2-08	Croke Park	Aidan O'Shea	6	Conor Lane (Cork)	18,000
2022	29 May	Galway	2-19	Roscommon	2-16	Pearse Stadium	Seán Kelly	3	Joe McQuillan (Cavan)	21,419
2023	7 May	Galway	2-20	Sligo	0-12	MacHale Park	Seán Kelly	14	Brendan Cawley (Kildare)	11,867
2024	5 May	Galway	0-16	Mayo	0-15	Pearse Stadium	Seán Kelly	1	David Gough (Meath)	19,193
2025	4 May	Galway	1–17	Mayo	1–15	MacHale Park	Seán Kelly	2	Paddy Neilan (Roscommon)	27,137
2026	10 May	Roscommon	3-21	Galway	2-22	Dr Hyde Park	Diarmuid Murtagh	2	Sean Hurson (Tyrone)	22,799

=== Notes ===
- 1888–1891: No Connacht representative in All-Ireland series
- 1892: Roscommon represented the province
- 1893–1899: No Connacht representative in All-Ireland series
- 1900: Galway unopposed
- 1902: Galway unopposed
- 1922: Objection – refixed
- 1939: Game unfinished – awarded to Mayo
- 1934: Leitrim withdrew until 1941.
- 1938: Roscommon until 1940.
- 1946: Objection and counter-objection – replay ordered
- 1950: Leitrim withdrew until 1952.
- 1975: London join the championship.
- 1999: New York join the championship.
- 2001: London withdrew due to Foot and Mouth disease.
- 2025-2017: Preliminary round for New York fixture originally a Quarter-final revert to in 2018.
- 2020: Sligo withdrew for 1 year while London and New York for 2 years due to COVID-19.

== Team records and statistics ==
=== Roll of honour ===
==== Legend ====
- Golden background – Connacht SFC winner or runner-up also won the All-Ireland SFC that year.

==== Performance by team ====
County team	Title(s)	Runner-up	Championships won	Championships runner-up
Galway	51	35	1900, 1902, 1910, 1911, 1913, 1917, 1919, 1922, 1925, 1926, 1933, 1934, 1938, 1940, 1941, 1942, 1945, 1954, 1956, 1957, 1958, 1959, 1960, 1963, 1964, 1965, 1966, 1968, 1970, 1971, 1973, 1974, 1976, 1982, 1983, 1984, 1986, 1987, 1995, 1998, 2000, 2002, 2003, 2005, 2008, 2016, 2018, 2022, 2023, 2024, 2025	1901, 1907, 1908, 1909, 1910, 1912, 1918, 1923, 1924, 1927, 1929, 1935, 1936, 1937, 1939, 1943, 1948, 1951, 1961, 1962, 1969, 1977, 1978, 1990, 1996, 1999, 2006, 2007, 2009, 2014, 2017, 2019, 2020, 2021, 2026
Mayo	47	36	1901, 1904, 1906, 1907, 1908, 1909, 1915, 1916, 1918, 1920, 1921, 1923, 1924, 1929, 1930, 1931, 1932, 1935, 1936, 1937, 1939, 1948, 1949, 1950, 1951, 1955, 1967, 1969, 1981, 1985, 1988, 1989, 1992, 1993, 1996, 1997, 1999, 2004, 2006, 2009, 2011, 2012, 2013, 2014, 2015, 2020, 2021	1903, 1905, 1913, 1917, 1925, 1926, 1928, 1933, 1934, 1938, 1940, 1944, 1945, 1946, 1952, 1953, 1964, 1966, 1968, 1972, 1973, 1975, 1979, 1980, 1982, 1983, 1984, 1987, 1991, 1994, 1995, 2001, 2003, 2005, 2008, 2024, 2025
Roscommon	25	25	1892, 1903, 1905, 1912, 1914, 1943, 1944, 1946, 1947, 1952, 1953, 1961, 1962, 1972, 1977, 1978, 1979, 1980, 1990, 1991, 2001, 2010, 2017, 2019, 2026	1906, 1911, 1915, 1916, 1919, 1925, 1931, 1941, 1942, 1950, 1955, 1970, 1974, 1976, 1985, 1986, 1988, 1989, 1992, 1993, 1998, 2011, 2016, 2018, 2022
Sligo	3	16	1928, 1975, 2007	1920, 1922, 1930, 1932, 1947, 1954, 1956, 1965, 1971, 1981, 1997, 2002, 2010, 2012, 2015, 2023
Leitrim	2	9	1927, 1994	1914, 1949, 1957, 1958, 1959, 1960, 1963, 1967, 2000
London	0	1	—N/a	2013

=== Performance by province ===
Province	Titles	Runner-up	Total
Connacht	126	119	245
Britain	0	1	1

=== Team results ===
Legend

- 1st – Winner
- 2nd – Runner-up
- SF/QF/PR – Semi-finalist / Quarter-finalist / Preliminary round exit

For each year, the number of competing teams is shown (in brackets).

Team	2013 (7)	2014 (7)	2015 (7)	2016 (7)	2017 (7)	2018 (7)	2019 (7)	2020 (4)	2021 (5)	2022 (7)	2023 (7)	2024 (7)	2025 (7)	2026 (7)	Years
Galway	QF	2nd	SF	1st	2nd	1st	2nd	2nd	2nd	1st	1st	1st	1st	2nd	14
Leitrim	SF	QF	QF	QF	SF	SF	QF	QF	SF	SF	QF	QF	SF	SF	14
London	2nd	QF	QF	QF	QF	QF	QF	—N/a	—N/a	QF	QF	QF	QF	QF	12
Mayo	1st	1st	1st	SF	SF	QF	SF	1st	1st	QF	QF	2nd	2nd	SF	14
New York	QF	QF	PR	PR	PR	QF	QF	—N/a	—N/a	QF	SF	QF	QF	QF	12
Roscommon	SF	SF	SF	2nd	1st	2nd	1st	SF	SF	2nd	SF	SF	SF	1st	14
Sligo	QF	SF	2nd	SF	QF	SF	SF	—N/a	QF	SF	2nd	SF	QF	QF	13

=== Most recent championship meetings ===
	Gal	Lei	Lon	May	New	Ros	Sli
Galway	—N/a	2026	2024	2025	2025	2026	2024
Leitrim		—N/a	2022	2025	2023	2019	2026
London			—N/a	2026	-	2025	2023
Mayo				—N/a	2024	2026	2025
New York					—N/a	2026	2023
Roscommon						—N/a	2022
Sligo							—N/a

=== Consecutive titles ===
==== Quintuple ====
- Mayo (1906, 1907, 1908, 1909, 1910)
- Galway (1956, 1957, 1958, 1959, 1960)
- Mayo (2011, 2012, 2013, 2014, 2015)

==== Quadruple ====
- Mayo (1929, 1930, 1931, 1932)
- Mayo (1948, 1949, 1950, 1951)
- Galway (1963, 1964, 1965, 1966)
- Roscommon (1977, 1978, 1979, 1980)
- Galway (2022, 2023, 2024, 2025)

==== Treble ====
- Mayo (1935, 1936, 1937)
- Galway (1940, 1941, 1942)
- Galway (1982, 1983, 1984)

==== Double ====
- Mayo (1915, 1916)
- Mayo (1920, 1921)
- Mayo (1923, 1924)
- Galway (1925, 1926)
- Galway (1933, 1934)
- Roscommon (1943, 1944)
- Roscommon (1946, 1947)
- Roscommon (1952, 1953)
- Roscommon (1961, 1962)
- Galway (1970, 1971)
- Galway (1973, 1974)
- Galway (1986, 1987)
- Mayo (1988, 1989)
- Roscommon (1990, 1991)
- Mayo (1992, 1993)
- Mayo (1996, 1997)
- Galway (2002, 2003)
- Mayo (2020, 2021)

==== Single ====
- Galway (1900, 1902, 1911, 1913, 1917, 1919, 1922, 1938, 1945, 1954, 1968, 1976, 1995, 1998, 2000, 2005, 2008, 2016, 2018)
- Mayo (1901, 1904, 1918, 1939, 1955, 1967, 1969, 1981, 1985, 1999, 2004, 2006, 2009)
- Roscommon (1892, 1903, 1905, 1912, 1914, 1972, 2001, 2010, 2017, 2019, 2026)
- Sligo (1928, 1975, 2007)
- Leitrim (1927, 1994)

=== Titles by decade ===
The most successful team of each decade, judged by number of Connacht SFC titles, is as follows:

- 1900s: 6 for Mayo (1901, 1904, 1906, 1907, 1908, 1909)
- 1910s: 4 each for Mayo (1910, 1915, 1916, 1918) and Galway (1911, 1913, 1917, 1919)
- 1920s: 5 for Mayo (1920, 1921, 1923, 1924, 1929)
- 1930s: 7 for Mayo (1930, 1931, 1932, 1935, 1936, 1937, 1939)
- 1940s: 4 each for Mayo (1940, 1941, 1942, 1945) and Roscommon (1943, 1944, 1946, 1947)
- 1950s: 5 for Galway (1954, 1956, 1957, 1958, 1959)
- 1960s: 6 for Galway (1960, 1963, 1964, 1965, 1966, 1968)
- 1970s: 5 for Galway (1970, 1971, 1973, 1974, 1976)
- 1980s: 5 for Galway (1982, 1983, 1984, 1986, 1987)
- 1990s: 5 for Mayo (1992, 1993, 1996, 1997, 1999)
- 2000s: 5 for Galway (2000, 2002, 2003, 2005, 2008)
- 2010s: 5 for Mayo (2011, 2012, 2013, 2014, 2015)
- 2020s: 4 for Galway (2022, 2023, 2024, 2025)

=== Team debuts ===
Year	Debutants	Total
1900	Galway	1
1901	Mayo, Roscommon	2
1902–04	None	0
1905	Sligo	1
1906	Leitrim	1
1907–74	None	0
1975	London	1
1976–98	None	0
1999	New York	1
2000–	None	0
Total		7

=== Other records ===
==== Final success rate ====
No county teamss have appeared in the final, being victorious on all occasions.

On the opposite end of the scale, one team has appeared in the final, losing on each occasion:

- London (2013)

==== Gaps ====
- Longest gaps between successive Connacht SFC titles:
  - 67 years: Leitrim (1927–1994)
  - 47 years: Sligo (1928–1975)
  - 32 years: Sligo (1975–2007)
  - 29 years: Roscommon (1914–1943)
  - 12 years: Mayo (1955–1967)
  - 12 years: Mayo (1969–1981)
  - 11 years: Roscommon (1892–1903)
  - 10 years: Roscommon (1962–1972)
  - 10 years: Roscommon (1980–1990)
  - 10 years: Roscommon (1991–2001)
- Longest gaps between successive Connacht SFC finals:
  - 27 years: Leitrim (1967–1994)
  - 22 years: Leitrim (1927–1949)
  - 16 years: Sligo (1981–1997)
  - 15 years: Sligo (1932–1947)
  - 13 years: Leitrim (1914–1927)
  - 11 years: Roscommon (1892–1903)
  - 10 years: Roscommon (1931–1941)

==== Active gaps ====
- Longest active gaps since a Connacht SFC title:
  - 32 years: Leitrim (1994–)
  - 19 years: Sligo (2007–)
  - 5 years: Mayo (2021–)
  - 1 year: Galway (2025–)
- Longest active gap since a Connacht SFC final appearance:
  - 26 years: Leitrim (2000–)
  - 13 years: London (2013–)
  - 3 years: Sligo (2023–)
  - 1 year: Mayo (2025–)

==== Connacht final pairings ====
Pairing	Meetings	First meeting	Last meeting
Galway v Mayo	46	1901	2025
Mayo v Roscommon	26	1903	2011
Galway v Roscommon	22	1910	2026
Mayo v Sligo	9	1920	2015
Galway v Sligo	8	1922	2023
Galway v Leitrim	7	1927	2000
Leitrim v Mayo	3	1949	1994
Roscommon v Sligo	2	1947	2010
Leitrim v Roscommon	1	1914	
London v Mayo	1	2013	
Galway (unopposed / unknown)	2	1900	1902

== Player records ==
=== Each team's most recent winning captain ===
- Galway: Seán Kelly (2023)
- Leitrim: Declan Darcy (1994)
- Mayo: Aidan O'Shea (2021)
- Roscommon: Diarmuid Murtagh (2026)
- Sligo: Noel McGuire (2007)

== Managers ==
Managers in the Connacht SFC are involved in the day-to-day running of the team, including the training, team selection, and sourcing of players from the club championships. Their influence varies from county-to-county and is related to the individual county boards. From 2018, all inter-county head coaches must be Award 2 qualified. The manager is assisted by a team of two or three selectors and an extensive backroom team consisting of various coaches. Prior to the development of the concept of a manager in the 1970s, teams were usually managed by a team of selectors with one member acting as chairman.

=== Winning managers (1983–2024) ===
#	Manager(s)	Winning team(s)	Titles(s)	Winning years
1	John O'Mahony	Mayo; Leitrim; Galway	8	1988, 1989, 2009; 1994; 1998, 2000, 2002, 2003
2	James Horan	Mayo	6	2011, 2012, 2013, 2014, 2020, 2021
3	John Maughan	Mayo	4	1996, 1997, 1999, 2004
	Pádraic Joyce	Galway	4	2022, 2023, 2024, 2025
5	Mattie McDonagh	Galway	2	1982, 1983
5	Martin McDermott	Roscommon	2	1990, 1991
5	Jack O'Shea	Mayo	2	1992, 1993
5	Kevin Walsh	Galway	2	2016, 2018
9	Brian McEniff	Sligo	1	1975
9	Tony Regan	Galway	1	1984
9	Liam O'Neill	Mayo	1	1985
9	Cyril Dunne	Galway	1	1986
9	Willie Joyce	Galway	1	1987
9	Bosco McDermott	Galway	1	1995
9	John Tobin	Roscommon	1	2001
9	Peter Ford	Galway	1	2005
9	Mickey Moran	Mayo	1	2006
9	Tommy Breheny	Sligo	1	2007
9	Liam Sammon	Galway	1	2008
9	Fergal O'Donnell	Roscommon	1	2010
9	Noel Connelly	Mayo	1	2015
9	Pat Holmes	Mayo	1	2015
9	Kevin McStay	Roscommon	1	2017
9	Anthony Cunningham	Roscommon	1	2019

== Venues ==
=== Stadia and locations ===
County team	Location	Province	Stadium	Capacity
Galway	Galway	Connacht	Pearse Stadium	26,197
Leitrim	Carrick-on-Shannon	Connacht	Páirc Seán Mac Diarmada	9,331
London	South Ruislip	Britain	McGovern Park	3,000
Mayo	Castlebar	Connacht	MacHale Park	25,369
New York	Bronx	North America	Gaelic Park	2,000
Roscommon	Roscommon	Connacht	Dr Hyde Park	25,000
Sligo	Sligo	Connacht	Markievicz Park	18,558

== See also ==
- Connacht Senior Club Football Championship
- Connacht Senior Hurling Championship
- All-Ireland Senior Football Championship
  - Leinster Senior Football Championship
  - Munster Senior Football Championship
  - Ulster Senior Football Championship
