= Andy Moran =

Gaelic footballer and manager

Personal information
- Native name: Aindriú Ó Móráin (Irish)
- Born: 2 November 1983 (age 43) Ballaghaderreen, County Roscommon, Ireland
- Occupation: Co–Owner of The Movement Castlebar
- Height: 1.78 m (5 ft 10 in)

Sport
- Sport: Gaelic football
- Position: Full Forward
Club
- Years: Club
- 2001–2022: Ballaghaderreen
Club titles
- Mayo titles: 2
College(s)
- Years: College
- IT Sligo; UUJ
College titles
- Sigerson titles: 3
Inter-county*
Years	County	Apps (scores)
2004–2019	Mayo	92 (11–110)
Inter-county titles
- Connacht titles: 8
- NFL: 2
- All Stars: 2
Club management
- Years: Club
- 2021: Ballaghaderreen
Inter-county management
- Years: Team
- 2021–2024 2024–2025 2025–: Leitrim; Monaghan (back room coach); Mayo
Inter-county titles as manager
County	League	Province	All-Ireland
1			1
- *Inter County team apps and scores correct as of 21:28, 7 November 2025.

Andy Moran (born 2 November 1983) is an Irish Gaelic football manager and former player for Ballaghaderreen and Mayo. Prior to his appointment as Mayo manager in August 2025, Moran managed Leitrim and served as part of Gabriel Bannigan's backroom team with Monaghan.

Moran made his 150th league and championship appearance for Mayo in June 2017, his 13th season. As manager, he led Mayo to victory in the 2026 All-Ireland Football final, the county's first title since 1951.

== Playing career ==
Although Ballaghaderreen town was transferred from County Mayo to County Roscommon under the Local Government (Ireland) Act 1898, the GAA club competes in Mayo and many of its players declare for that county. As in this case, Moran chose to play for Mayo, this decision has been received negatively from Roscommon GAA supporters. Although, Roscommon GAA condemned fans who booed Moran in a 2017 All-Ireland SFC quarter-final game against Mayo.

In 2011, Moran (named at full-forward on the team selection) won his first All Star award.

In 2012, Moran, a former vice-captain, was named captain of the Mayo senior team. He then injured himself in the 53rd minute of the All-Ireland SFC quarter-final defeat of Down, having to be stretchered off the field of play and left lying on a medical trolley in the tunnel of Croke Park with ice strapped to his knee. As a result, he missed the rest of the season, including the 2012 All-Ireland Senior Football Championship final against Donegal, after undergoing surgery on his torn cruciate knee ligament. he returned against Galway in the 2013 Connacht SFC quarter-final and scored as Mayo won by 4-16 to 1-11 points. He was the highest scoring Mayo forward in the 2013 All-Ireland SFC. Moran was starting against Dublin in the 2016 All-Ireland SFC final, but his team was defeated by a single point. The following year, Mayo also lost to Dublin in the 2017 All-Ireland SFC final, again by a single point.

Throughout his playing days, Moran was an All-Ireland SFC runner-up on six occasions. In 2017, he was awarded his second All Star Award, and also a Footballer of the Year for the first and only time.

He played his last game for Ballaghaderreen at the age of 38 on 1 October 2022, scoring a hat-trick of goals and points (3–3) in a 6–8 to 2–8 win against Davitts.

== Managerial career ==
=== Ballaghaderreen, senior management with Leitrim and back room management with Monaghan ===
Moran helped Mayo under-20 team in a coaching capacity in 2020 before taking over his native Ballaghaderreen along with Mike Solan ahead of the 2021 season. In October 2021, it was announced that Andy Moran would be the Leitrim senior football manager, taking over from Terry Hyland who stepped down following the 2021 Connacht SFC semi-final against Mayo. Moran's first win with Leitrim was against Tipperary in Round 2 of the 2022 National Football League.

On 4 July 2024, Moran stepped down as Leitrim manager after three seasons.

Moran joined Gabriel Bannigan's backroom team when Bannigan was appointed as Monaghan senior manager in 2024.

=== Mayo senior management and All-Ireland win ===
On 14 August 2025, Mayo ratified Moran as the new manager of the Mayo senior football team.

Andy Moran's first Connacht Football Championship as Mayo manager started with a victory against London in the quarter final, but lost to Roscommon in the semi final.

On 26 July 2026, Moran won the 2026 All-Ireland Senior Football Championship final with Mayo, becoming the first manager to do so in 75 years.

== Media career ==
Moran has done broadcasting duties for eir Sport.

== Personal life ==
Moran is a supporter of the association football team Liverpool.

== Honours ==
=== As player ===
- Connacht Senior Football Championship (8): 2004, 2006, 2009, 2011, 2012, 2013, 2014, 2015
- National Football League (1): 2019
- Sigerson Cup (3): 2004–2005, 2008
- Connacht Under-21 Football Championship (2): 2003–2004
- Connacht Minor Football Championship (2): 2000–2001
- Mayo Senior Football Championship (2): 2008, 2012
- All Star (2): 2011, 2017
- GAA/GPA Footballer of the Year (1): 2017
- All-Ireland Senior Football Championship: Runner-Up (6): 2004, 2006, 2012–2013, 2016–2017

=== As manager ===
- All-Ireland Senior Football Championship: 2026
