= Shane Walsh (Gaelic footballer) =

Galway Gaelic footballer

Personal information
- Native name: Séan Breathnach (Irish)
- Nickname: Shaney
- Born: 4 June 1993 (age 33) Galway, Ireland
- Occupation: Student PE teacher
- Height: 1.85 m (6 ft 1 in)

Sport
- Sport: Gaelic football
- Position: Corner-forward
Clubs
- Years: Club
- 2010–2022 2022–: Kilkerrin–Clonberne; Kilmacud Crokes
Club titles
- Dublin titles: 2
- Connacht titles: 2
- All-Ireland Titles: 1
Inter-county*
Years	County	Apps (scores)
2013–	Galway	52 (7–186)
Inter-county titles
- Connacht titles: 6
- All Stars: 1
- *Inter County team apps and scores correct as of match played 28 July 2024.

Shane Walsh (born 4 June 1993) is a Gaelic footballer who, since 2022, plays for the Kilmacud Crokes club and, since 2013, for the Galway senior team. From 2010 to 2022, he played for the Kilkerrin–Clonberne club.

== Club ==
=== Kilkerrin–Clonberne ===
Walsh played for the Kilkerrin–Clonberne club in North Galway from 2010 to 2022. That club competes in the Galway Intermediate Football Championship.

=== Kilmacud transfer ===
On 30 July 2022, news emerged that Walsh was seeking a transfer to Kilmacud Crokes, the Dublin SFC title holder.this came as shock to the Kilkerrin cloberne fans .

On 1 August 2022, Walsh confirmed his intention to join Kilmacud Crokes in time to play in the upcoming Dublin SFC. In a brief statement, he mentioned that he was studying and living in Dublin and that, while he intended to return to his home club of Kilkerrin–Clonberne before the end of his playing days, a switch to the Stillorgan-based club was "the right move" for him. His transfer was completed on 25 August.

Walsh made his debut as a substitute against Templeogue Synge Street on 4 September. He scored 0–1 in the club's 3–25 to 1–6 win.

Walsh scored 1–3 for Kilmacud Crokes in the 2023 All-Ireland Club SFC final, and, in the process, won his first All-Ireland Club SFC title.

== Inter-county ==
After a successful underage county and schools' career with St Jarlath's College, Tuam, Walsh joined the Galway senior team in 2013. He was nominated for the Young Footballer of the Year award in 2014. The same year he was nominated for an All Star for the first time.

In his early inter-county career with Galway, Walsh reached the 2014 and 2016 All-Ireland SFC quarter-finals. He won his first two Connacht Senior Football Championship titles in 2016 and 2018, following this with a 2018 All-Ireland SFC semi-final appearance. He received his second All Star nomination in 2018.

Galway manager Pádraic Joyce named Walsh as captain ahead of the 2020 season. He received his third All Star nomination in 2020 and his fourth in 2021. Walsh remained as captain for two seasons until Joyce appointed Seán Kelly as his successor ahead of the 2022 season.

He won his third Connacht SFC title in 2022. Then he was at the centre of an incident during the first half of Galway's 2022 All-Ireland SFC semi-final win against Derry when the Hawk-Eye score detection system malfunctioned and overruled an umpire who signalled that Walsh's '45 into Hill 16 late in the half had gone over the bar. This meant that Galway entered the half-time break a point behind. However, the referee retrospectively awarded the point and the game resumed for the second half with the teams level on the scoreboard. Walsh played in the 2022 All-Ireland SFC final against Kerry, his first appearance in the decider. He was voted Footballer of the Week on the GAA.ie website after Galway's defeat, a game in which he scored 0–9. He also won an All Star that year.

Walsh won his fourth Connacht SFC title in 2023.

He won his fifth Connacht SFC title in 2024, later playing in the 2024 All-Ireland SFC final, his second appearance in the decider. Galway won their fourth consecutive Connacht SFC title in 2025, despite Walsh missing the championship with an injury.

== Career statistics ==
As of match played 28 July 2024

Team	Year	National League			Connacht		All-Ireland		Total	
Team	Year	Division	Apps	Score	Apps	Score	Apps	Score	Apps	Score
Galway	2013	Division 1			1	0–1	2	0–0	3	0–1
Galway	2014	Division 1			3	1–19	2	0–10	5	1–29
Galway	2015	Division 1			2	1–4	2	0–1	4	1–5
Galway	2016	Division 1			3	0–4	1	0–4	4	0–8
Galway	2017	Division 1			2	0–7	2	0–2	4	0–9
Galway	2018	Division 1			3	0–16	4	1–16	7	1–32
Galway	2019	Division 1			3	0–15	1	1–3	4	1–18
Galway	2020	Division 1			1	0–7	-		1	0–7
Galway	2021	Division 1			2	1–3	-		2	1–3
Galway	2022	Division 1			3	1–17	3	0–19	6	1–36
Galway	2023	Division 1			2	0–4	1	0–6	3	0–10
Galway	2024	Division 1			2	0–4	7	1–24	9	1–28
Career total					27	4–101	25	3–85	52	7–186

== Honours ==
=== Galway ===
- Connacht Under-21 Football Championship (1): 2013
- All-Ireland Under-21 Football Championship (1): 2013
- Connacht Senior Football Championship (6): 2016, 2018, 2022, 2023, 2024

=== Kilmacud Crokes ===
- All-Ireland Senior Club Football Championship (1): 2023
- Leinster Senior Club Football Championship (2): 2022, 2023
- Dublin Senior Football Championship (2): 2022, 2023

=== Individual ===
- The Sunday Game Team of the Year: 2022
- All Star (1): 2022

Sporting positions
Preceded by Damien Comer	Galway Senior Football Captain; 2020–2022	Succeeded by Seán Kelly
