= Noel Connelly =

Irish Gaelic footballer and manager

Noel Connelly (born 1972) is an Irish former Gaelic football manager and player.

== Career ==
He played as a midfielder at senior level for the Mayo county team before later serving as joint-manager of the team with Pat Holmes from 2014 until 2015. Connelly along with Pat Holmes left as joint managers of the Mayo team in 2015 after one year due to a player revolt and the threat of a strike by the team if they remained in charge.

== Honours ==
=== Player ===
Hollymount-Carramore

- Mayo Senior Football Championship (3): 1990, 1991, 1994

Mayo

- Connacht Senior Football Championship (3): 1996, 1997, 1999
- National Football League (1): 2000-01

=== Manager ===
Mayo

- Connacht Senior Football Championship (1): 2015
- All-Ireland Under-21 Football Championship (1): 2006

Sporting positions
Preceded by	Mayo Senior Football Captain; 1996–1997	Succeeded by
Preceded by James Horan	Mayo Senior Football Joint-Manager; 2014–2015	Succeeded by Stephen Rochford
