= 2009 Connacht Senior Football Championship =

2009 Connacht SFC
Tournament details
- Year: 2009

Winners
- Champions: Mayo

Runners-up
- Runners-up: Galway

The 2009 Connacht Senior Football Championship was that year's installment of the annual Connacht Senior Football Championship held under the auspices of the Connacht GAA. It was won by Mayo, who defeated Galway in the final. Commentators considered the final to be a weak affair. The winning Mayo team received the J. J. Nestor Cup and automatically advanced to the quarter-final stage of the 2009 All-Ireland Senior Football Championship.

== Bracket ==
Quarter-finals
New York	1-7
Mayo	1-18
Roscommon	2-13
Leitrim	2-9
London	1-7
Galway	1-18

Semi-finals
Mayo	3-18
Roscommon	0-7
Sligo	0-12
Galway	1-13

Final
Mayo	2-12
Galway	1-14

== Quarter-finals ==
10 May 2009
Quarter Final

New York	1-7 - 1-18	Mayo
P Smith 0-4, R Moran 0-2, F Cleary, R Caffrey, T McGovern, J McNicholas 0-1 each	Report	A O'Shea 1-3, A Moran 0-4, A Dillon, A Kilcoyne 0-3 each, P Harte 1-0, T Mortimer 0-2, T Parsons, P Gardiner, R McGarrity, B Moran 0-1 each

Gaelic Park, New York
24 May 2009
Quarter Final

London	1-7 - 1-18	Galway
M Alcorn 1-0, K Downes 0-2, J Hughes, A Moyles, K McMenamin, P Duffy, M Hughes 0-1 each	Report	M Meehan 1-5, S Armstrong 0-5, G Bradshaw, P Joyce 0-2 each, N Joyce, F Breathnach, C Bane, D Dunleavy 0-1 each

Ruislip, London
31 May 2009
Quarter Final

Leitrim	2-9 - 2-13	Roscommon
C Clarke, J McKeon 1-0 each, P McGuinness, James Glancy, R Cox 0-2 each, D Maxwell, T Beirne, S Foley 0-1 each	Report	D Shine 0-5, S Kilbride 1-1, K Mannion 1-0, G Cox 0-3, C Devaney, S McDermott, F Cregg, K Higgins 0-1

Páirc Sheáin Mhic Dhiarmada, Carrick-on-Shannon

== Semi-finals ==
20 June 2009
Semi Final

Mayo	3-18 - 0-7	Roscommon
A Dillon 0-6, A Kilcoyne 1-3, P Harte 1-1, A O'Shea 1-0, T Mortimer, R Garrity, P Gardiner 0-2 each, A Moran, M Ronaldson 0-1 each	Report	C Devaney, G Cox 0-2 each, K Mannion, D Shine, B Higgins 0-1 each

McHale Park, Castlebar
28 June 2009
Semi Final

Sligo	0-12 - 1-13	Galway
D Kelly 0-4, M Breheny, A Marren 0-2 each, R Donovan, J Davey, S Davey, S Coen 0-1 each, N Ewing SO	Report	S Armstrong 1-3, M Meehan 0-4, P Joyce 0-3, C Bane, J Bergin, G Bradshaw 0-1 each, G O'Donnell SO

Markievicz Park, Sligo

== Final ==
19 July 2009
Final

Mayo	2-12 - 1-14	Galway
C Mortimer 1-2, B Moran 1-0, D Heaney, A Dillon 0-2 each, P Gardiner, R McGarrity, P Harte, T Mortimer, A Kilcoyne, A O'Shea 0-1 each	Report	N Joyce 0-8, M Meehan 1-4, P Joyce, S Armstrong 0-1 each

Pearse Stadium, Galway
Attendance: 25,627
