= 2011 Connacht Senior Football Championship =

2011 Connacht SFC
Tournament details
- Year: 2011

Winners
- Champions: Mayo (42nd win)

Runners-up
- Runners-up: Roscommon

The 2011 Connacht Senior Football Championship was that year's installment of the annual Connacht Senior Football Championship held under the auspices of the Connacht GAA. It was won by Mayo who defeated Roscommon in the final. This was Mayo's 42nd Connacht senior title. They played the same team in the final as the semi-final victory over Galway. That semi-final was hailed as the "Connacht Classico." The winning Mayo team received the J. J. Nestor Cup, and automatically advanced to the quarter-final stage of the 2011 All-Ireland Senior Football Championship.

== Bracket ==
Quarter-finals
New York	1-11
Roscommon	3-21
Sligo	0-10
Leitrim	1-10
London	2-10
Mayo	0-19

Semi-finals
Roscommon	2-12
Leitrim	0-6
Galway	1-6
Mayo	1-12

Connacht final
Roscommon	0-11
Mayo	0-13

== Quarter-finals ==
22 May 2011
3:30pm
Quarter Final

Leitrim	1-10 - 0-10	Sligo
C Beirne 1-3 (0-1f), E Mulligan 0-2f, W McKeon, T Beirne, P Brennan, A Croal, J Glancy 0-1 each.	Report	A Marren 0-4 (2f), M Breheny 0-2 (1f), T Taylor, F Quinn, S Coen, D Maye (f) 0-1 each.

Markievicz Park, Sligo
Attendance: 7.354
Referee: J Curley (Meath)
1 May 2011
8:00pm
Quarter Final

New York	1-11 - 3-21	Roscommon
D Doona 0-4f, K O'Connor 1-1, J Kelly (1f, 1 '45'), CJ Molloy (1f) 0-2 each, S Harold, F Cleary 0-1 each.	Report	D Shine 0-5 (1f, 1 '45'), S Kilbride 1-4 (1f), K Higgins, C Cregg 1-1 each, C Devanney 0-3, I Kilbride, M Finneran, E Kenny, D Ward, P Domican, K Mannion, S O'Neill 0-1 each

Gaelic Park, New York
Attendance: 2,500
Referee: P McEnaney (Monaghan)
29 May 2011
3:00pm
Quarter Final

London	2-10 - 0-19 A.E.T.	Mayo
P Geraghty 1-1, C O'Sullivan 1-0, E O'Neill (2f), B Comer, K Phair (1f) 0-2 each, M Gottsche, J Collins, S McVeigh 0-1 each	Report	A Moran 0-7 (2f), A Dillon 0-4, K McLoughlin 0-2, J Doherty, T Mortimer, J Kilcullen, C O'Connor, A Freeman, R Hennelly ('45) 0-1 each

Ruislip
Attendance: 4,000
Referee: M Collins (Cork)

== Semi-finals ==
12 June 2011
2:00pm
Semi Final

Leitrim	0-6 - 2-12	Roscommon
E Mulligan, C Beirne (2f) 0-2 each, A Croal, R Gallagher 0-1 each.	Report	S Kilbride 0-5 (2f), D Shine, C Devaney 1-1 each, K Higgins 0-2, K Mannion, C Cregg, S O'Grady 0-1 each

Páirc Sheáin Mhic Dhiarmada, Carrick-on-Shannon
Attendance: 13,577
Referee: P McEnaney (Monaghan)
26 June 2011
2:00pm
Semi Final

Mayo	1-12 - 1-6	Galway
A Freeman 1-2, R Hennelly 0-2 (2f), T Mortimer, K McLoughlin, A Dillon (0-1f), A Moran, C O'Connor, J Doherty, E Varley, R McGarrity 0-1 each	Report	C Bane 0-4 (3f), P Conroy 1-0, P Joyce, E Concannon 0-1 each

McHale Park, Castlebar
Attendance: 19,375
Referee: R Hickey (Clare)

== Final ==
17 July 2011
2:00pm
Final

Roscommon	0-11 - 0-13	Mayo
D Shine (0-4fs, 0-1 '45) 0-8, D Ward, S Kilbride, C Cregg 0-1 each	Report	C O'Connor (0-8f) 0-8, P Gardiner, K McLoughlin, A Moran, A Dillon, E Varley 0-1 each

Dr Hyde Park, Roscommon
Attendance: 25,609
Referee: M Collins (Cork)
