= 2012 Connacht Senior Football Championship =

2012 Connacht SFC
Tournament details
- Year: 2012

Winners
- Champions: Mayo (43rd win)

Runners-up
- Runners-up: Sligo

The 2012 Connacht Senior Football Championship was that year's installment of the annual Connacht Senior Football Championship held under the auspices of the Connacht GAA. It was won by Mayo who defeated Sligo in the final. This was Mayo's 43rd Connacht senior title. Mayo were drawn at home with London or Leitrim in their semi-final, while Sligo's route was the harder—playing away to New York and overcoming Galway in their semi-final, only to fall at the final hurdle once again. The winning Mayo team received the J. J. Nestor Cup, and automatically advanced to the quarter-final stage of the 2012 All-Ireland Senior Football Championship. Sligo entered the All-Ireland Qualifiers but soon exited, with a tame 0-13 - 0-04 defeat by Kildare in their next game. Donegal defeated Connacht champions Mayo in the 2012 All-Ireland Senior Football Championship Final.

== Bracket ==
Quarter-finals
New York	0-6
Sligo	3-21
Galway	3-15
Roscommon	0-10
London	1-8
Leitrim	0-12

Semi-finals
Sligo	2-14
Galway	0-15
Mayo	4-20
Leitrim	0-10

Connacht final
Sligo	0-10
Mayo	0-12

== Quarter-finals ==
6 May 2012
8:00pm
Quarter Final

New York	0-6 - 3-21	Sligo
E Carew 0-3 (3f), CJ Molloy 0-2 (2f), S Kelly 0-1	Report	S Coen 2-4, A Marren 0-6 (2f), M Breheny 0-3 (3f), P Hughes 1-1, B Egan, S McManus, P McGovern, T Taylor, A Costello, R Donovan, E Mullen 0-1 each

Gaelic Park, New York
Referee: E Kinsella (Laois)
20 May 2012
4:00pm
Quarter Final

Roscommon	0-10 - 3-15	Galway
S Kilbride 0-3 (2f), D O'Gara, D Shine (2f) 0-2 each, C Cregg, K Mannion, G Heneghan 0-1 each	Report	P Conroy 1-4, G Sice 1-3 (2f), M Hehir 1-0, J Bergin, G Bradshaw, M Meehan (1f) 0-2 each, S Armstrong, K McGrath 0-1 each

Dr Hyde Park, Roscommon
Attendance: 12,962
Referee: J McQuillan (Cavan)
3 June 2012
3:00pm
Quarter Final

London	1-8 - 0-12	Leitrim
L Colfer 0-5 (4f), P McGoldrick 1-1, S Kelly, E O'Neill (f) 0-1 each.	Report	E Mulligan 0-5 (3f), J Glancy (Glencar-Manorhamilton) 0-2, C Clarke, A Croal, E Williams, D Sweeney, S Moran 0-1 each

Emerald GAA Grounds, London
Attendance: 1,000
Referee: R Hickey (Clare)

== Semi-finals ==
9 June 2012
6:00pm
Semi Final

Sligo	2-14 - 0-15	Galway
A Marren 2-6 (1-0 pen, 0-1 '45, 0-1f), A Costello 0-3 (1f) D Kelly 0-2, S McManus, M Breheny, P Hughes 0-1 each	Report	M Hehir 0-7 (6f), P Conroy 0-3, G Sice 0-3 (3f), M Meehan, S Armstrong 0-1 each

Pearse Stadium, Galway
Attendance: 8,556
Referee: M Deegan (Laois)
24 June 2012
3:30pm
Semi Final

Mayo	4-20 - 0-10	Leitrim
A Moran 2-0, C O'Connor 0-6f, K McLoughlin 1-2, A Freeman 1-0, A Dillon 0-3, C Mortimer 0-2 (1f), K Higgins, L Keegan, B Moran, D Geraghty, R McGarrity, M Conroy and E Varley 0-1 each	Report	E Mulligan 0-7 (5f), D Beck, D Sweeney and R Cox 0-1 each

McHale Park, Castlebar
Attendance: 14,398
Referee: M Higgins (Fermanagh)

== Final ==
15 July 2012
2:00pm
Final

Sligo	0-10 - 0-12	Mayo
A Marren 0-3 (2f), D Maye (f, '45'), A Costello (2f), M Breheny (1f) 0-2 each, D Kelly 0-1.	Report	C O’Connor 0-3 (2f, 1 ’45), A Dillon 0-2, A Moran, B Moran, L Keegan, C Boyle, A O’Shea, D Geraghty, E Varley (f) 0-1 each.

Dr Hyde Park, Roscommon
Attendance: 23,257
Referee: Cormac Reilly (Meath).
