= Pat Holmes (Gaelic footballer) =

Irish Gaelic footballer and manager

Pat Holmes is an Irish former Gaelic football manager and player.

He won a North Mayo Junior Championship in 1986 with Moygownagh. Work commitments caused him to join Castlebar for four years in the early ‘90s where he won Mayo and Connacht club championship medals in 1993.

He was very much involved in Mayo's All-Ireland runs in 1996 and 1997 and is the holder of six Connacht Senior Medals, a Connacht U21 Medal and a Hogan Cup Medal.

He was captain in 1994 when Mayo lost to Leitrim in the Connacht Final and is a former pupil of St Jarlath's College in Tuam, with whom he won an All-Ireland medal in 1984. He also earned an All Star in 1996.

== Career ==
He played in defence for the senior Mayo county team from 1988 to 1999 before taking over as manager from 2000 to 2002. He returned again to the Mayo management team, serving as joint-manager of the team from 2014 until 2015 with Noel Connelly.

Holmes and Noel Connelly stepped down as joint managers of the Mayo team in 2015 after just one year, following a player revolt and the teams threat to strike by the team if they remained in charge.

== Honours ==
=== Player ===
- Connacht Senior Football Championship (1): 1988, 1989, 1992, 1993, 1996, 1997
- Connacht Under-21 Football Championship (1): 1986
- Connacht club Senior Football Championship (with Castlebar Mitchels): 1993
- North Mayo Junior Championship (with Moygownagh): 1986

=== Manager ===
Mayo

- National Football League Division 1 : 2001
- Connacht Senior Football Championship (1): 2015
- All-Ireland Under-21 Football Championship (1): 2006

Sporting positions
Preceded by James Horan	Mayo Senior Football Joint-Manager; 2014–2015	Succeeded by Stephen Rochford
