= 2013 Connacht Senior Football Championship =

2013 Connacht SFC
Tournament details
- Year: 2013

Winners
- Champions: Mayo (44th win)

Runners-up
- Runners-up: London

The 2013 Connacht Senior Football Championship was that year's installment of the annual Connacht Senior Football Championship held under the auspices of the Connacht GAA. It was won by Mayo who defeated London in a final, which, historically, was the Exiles' first time to reach a provincial decider.

London's appearance in the Connacht final followed a remarkable turn of events. Having not won a Connacht championship match since 1977, they first overcame Sligo in their quarter-final meeting. They then secured a draw against Leitrim in the semi-final in Carrick-on-Shannon before winning the replay in Roscommon. Following that victory and with a first ever Connacht final ahead of them, the city's mayor Boris Johnson sent congratulations to the London team.

Mayo, on the other hand, had contested the previous year's All-Ireland Final and were extremely convincing on their march to the final. They humiliated their traditional rivals Galway in the quarter-finals, beating them comfortably in their own grounds. Galway had two players sent off and the game ended 4-16 to 0-11. Their next match saw Mayo face Roscommon in the semi-finals, a team who had run them close in the 2011 Connacht final two years earlier. This year, however, Mayo were winners by a much greater margin, beating them 0-21 to 0-09 in McHale Park.

In the end Mayo proved too much for London, winning the J. J. Nestor Cup, and automatically advanced to the quarter-final stage of the All-Ireland. This was Mayo's 45th Connacht title, and saw them overtake Galway on 44. They progressed to the 2013 All-Ireland Senior Football Championship Final. London entered the final round of the All-Ireland Qualifiers and headed to Croke Park for the first time, where they lost to Cavan.

== Bracket ==
Quarter-finals
New York	0-7
Leitrim	4-19
Sligo	0-14
London	1-12
Galway	0-11
Mayo	4-16

Semi-finals
Leitrim	1-13
London	2-11
Roscommon	0-9
Mayo	0-21

Final
London	0-10
Mayo	5-11

== Quarter-finals ==
5 May 2013
Quarter-Final

New York	0-7 - 4-19	Leitrim
J. Kelly 0-02, C. Molloy, C. Lynam, M. Annett, J. Burke, R. Woods 0-01 each	Report	E. Mulligan 3-07, R. Lowe 1-01, J. Glancy 0-03, T. Beirne, B. Brennan 0-02 each, W. McKeon, D. Sweeney, G. Hickey, K. Conlon 0-01 each

Gaelic Park, New York City
Referee: Martin Higgins (Fermanagh)

19 May 2013
Quarter-Final

Galway	0-11 - 4-16	Mayo
M. Meehan 0-05, D. Cummins, S. Armstrong 0-02 each, P. Conroy, S. Walsh 0-01 each	Report	C. O'Connor 0-06, E. Varley 1-03, D. Vaughan 1-01, C. Carolan, A. Moran 1-00 each, A. Dillon 0-02, L. Keegan, A. Freeman, R. Feeney, D. Coen 0-01 each

Pearse Stadium, Galway
Attendance: 16,233
Referee: Marty Duffy (Sligo)

26 May 2013
Quarter Final

London	1-12 - 0-14	Sligo
L. Mulvey 1-02, M. Gottche 0-04, C. McGee 0-03, P. McGoldrick, B. Mitchell, S. Kelly 0-01 each	Report	M. Breheny 0-04, T. Taylor, C. Harrison 0-03 each, A. Marren 0-02, N. Murphy, P. Hughes 0-01 each

Emerald GAA Grounds, London
Referee: Padraig O'Sullivan (Kerry)

== Semi-finals ==
16 June 2013
Semi-Final

Roscommon	0-9 - 0-21	Mayo
S. Kilbride 0-03, E. Smith 0-02, K. Higgins, C. Devaney, K. Mannion, D. Smith 0-01 each	Report	K. McLoughlin 0-05, A. Freeman 0-04, C. Boyle, D. Coen 0-02 each, K. Higgins, L. Keegan, D. Vaughan, A. O'Shea, R. Feeney, E. Varley, A. Dillon, A. Moran 0-01 each

McHale Park, Castlebar
Attendance: 19,867
Referee: Michael Duffy (Sligo)

23 June 2013
Semi Final

Leitrim	0-13 - 2-7	London
K. Conlon 0-03, P. McGowan, B. Brennan, D. Sweeney 0-02 each, E. Mulligan, P. Brennan, R. Lowe, J. Glancy 0-01 each	Report	L. Mulvey, S. Kelly 1-01 each, D. Traynor, S. Hannon, M. Gottsche, P. McGoldrick, C. Magee 0-01 each

Páirc Seán Mac Diarmada, Carrick-on-Shannon
Referee: Barry Cassidy (Derry)

30 June 2013
Semi Final Replay

London	2-11 - 1-13	Leitrim
L.Mulvey 0-05, C.McCallion 1-01, G.Crowley 1-00, E.O'Neill, T.Gaughan 0-02 each, C.Magee 0-01	Report	K.Conlon 0-08, J.Glancy 1-00, R.Lowe 0-03, B.Brennan, E.Mulligan 0-01 each

Dr Hyde Park, Roscommon
Attendance: 5,217
Referee: Cormac Reilly (Meath)

== Final ==
21 July 2013
Final

London	0-10 - 5-11	Mayo
L Mulvey 0-7 (6f), D Dunleavy 0-1, S Kelly 0-1 (1f), P McGoldrick 0-1	Report	C O'Connor 3-3 (1 pen, 2f), A Freeman 1-2, D Coen 1-0, K McLoughlin 0-2 (1f), L Keegan 0-2, A Moran 0-1, R Feeney 0-1

McHale Park, Castlebar
Attendance: 21,274
Referee: Conor Lane (Cork)
