= 2008 Connacht Senior Football Championship =

2008 Connacht SFC
Tournament details
- Year: 2008

Winners
- Champions: Galway (44th win)

Runners-up
- Runners-up: Mayo

The 2008 Connacht Senior Football Championship was that year's installment of the annual Connacht Senior Football Championship held under the auspices of the Connacht GAA. It was won by Galway who defeated Mayo in the final. It was their fifth title of the decade and their 44th in their history. Had Galway lost it would have been the first time since 1937 that they would have lost three consecutive Connacht finals.

This was Galway's ninth such final in eleven years. However, this marked an important stage in the decline of Galway football as it was also their last senior Connacht title to date - they lost the 2009 final, exited the 2010-2012 championships at the semi-final stage and exited the 2013 championship at the quarter-final stage. The winning Galway team received the J. J. Nestor Cup, and automatically advanced to the quarter-final stage of the 2008 All-Ireland Senior Football Championship.

== Bracket ==
Quarter-finals
New York	0-6
Leitrim	0-17
Roscommon	0-6
Galway	2-16
London	0-7
Sligo	2-17

Semi-finals
Leitrim	1-13
Galway	2-14
Mayo	3-11
Sligo	0-7

Final
Galway	2-12
Mayo	1-14

== Quarter-finals ==
11 May 2008
Quarter Final

New York	0-6 - 0-17	Leitrim
L. O'Donnell 0-02 (2f), A. O'Connor, D. Doona, P. Smyth, M. Dobbin 0-01 each.	Report	E. Mulligan 0-10 (9f), M. Duignan 0-03, D. Maxwell, D. O'Connor, D. Brennan, P. McGuinness 0-01 each.

Gaelic Park, New York
18 May 2008
Quarter Final

Galway	2-16 - 0-6	Roscommon
M Clancy 1-3, P Conroy 0-6 (4f), M Meehan 0-5 (2f, 2x'45'), N Coleman 1-0, P Joyce 0-2	Report	S Kilbride 0-3, G Heneghan 0-2 (2f), K Mannion 0-1; G Cox SO

Pearse Stadium, Galway
25 May 2008
Quarter Final

London	0-7 - 2-17	Sligo
P Hehir, CD Tara (0-3 each), A Rafferty (0-1)	Report	M Breheny 1-11, G Gaughan 1-2, J Davey 0-2, B Curran, D Kelly (0-01 each)

Ruislip, London

== Semi-finals ==
15 June 2008
Semi Final

Galway	2-14 - 1-13	Leitrim
P Joyce 1-4 (1f), C Bane 1-2, M Meehan 0-4 (1f), N Joyce 0-2, M Clancy, N Coleman 0-1 each	Report	E Mulligan 0-10 (10f), D Maxwell 1-1, D Brennan, M Foley 0-1 each

Pearse Stadium, Galway
22 June 2008
Semi Final

Mayo	3-11 - 0-7	Sligo
C Mortimer 0-5, A Kilcoyne 1-1, P Harte 1-1 (1-0 pen), T Mortimer 1-0, T Parsons, A O'Malley 0-2 each	Report	M Breheny 0-4 (3f), D Kelly 0-3

MacHale Park, Castlebar

== Final ==
13 July 2008
Final

Galway	2-12 - 1-14	Mayo
P Joyce 1-3, F Breathnach 1-0, M Meehan (2f), C Bane 0-3 each, G Bradshaw, S Armstrong, P Conroy 0-1 each	Report	A Dillon 0-7 (5f), A Kilcoyne 1-0, BJ Padden, C Mortimer 0-2 each, T Mortimer, R McGarrity, P Harte 0-1 each

MacHale Park, Castlebar
Attendance: 31,789
Referee: David Coldrick (Meath)

== Statistics ==
Top Scorer: E Mulligan (Leitrim); 0-20
