= James Horan (Gaelic footballer) =

Irish Gaelic footballer and manager

Personal information
- Native name: Séamus Ó hÓráin (Irish)
- Born: 1971 or 1972 (age 54–55) New Zealand
- Occupation: Process Quality Manager

Sport
- Sport: Gaelic football
- Position: Left half-forward
Club
- Years: Club
- 2007–2010: Ballintubber
Inter-county
- Years: County
- 2010–2014 2018–2022: Mayo; Mayo
Inter-county titles
- Connacht titles: 5
- All-Irelands: 0
- NFL: 1
- All Stars: 2

James Horan (born 1971 or 1972) is a Gaelic football manager and former player. He is the two-time former manager of the Mayo county team.

Horan led Mayo to consecutive All-Ireland SFC finals during his first spell in charge with a return of two defeats: in 2012 by Donegal and in 2013 by Dublin. He also led Mayo to consecutive All-Ireland SFC finals during his second spell in charge, again with a return of two defeats: in 2020 by Dublin (the fourth final Mayo had lost to Dublin in eight years) and in 2021 by Tyrone.

== Career ==
Horan was born in New Zealand.

Horan experienced a successful playing career at club level with Ballintubber and at inter-county level with Mayo. He was a key member of the half-forward line on the latter team throughout the 1990s and collected three Connacht titles and two All-Star awards in 1996 and 1999. Immediately after retiring from inter-county football, Horan became involved in team management. He was appointed manager of his native club, Ballintubber, in 2007 and guided the team back to the senior ranks and to a senior championship final after three years in charge.

Horan was appointed manager of the Mayo senior football team in October 2010 on a three-year term. Mayo lost the 2012 All-Ireland Senior Football Championship Final to Donegal. In October 2012 he agreed a new two-year extension to his contract. Mayo qualified for the 2013 All-Ireland Senior Football Championship Final after defeating Tyrone in the semi-final. Mayo lost in the final for the second year in a row, this time to Dublin on a 1–14 to 2–12 scoreline.

On 30 August 2014, following a semi-final replay defeat to Kerry, Horan resigned as Mayo manager. In his first interview after stepping down, Horan showed his frustration by lashing out at the Mayo County Board.

On 4 October 2018, Horan returned as Mayo manager on a four-year term. A 2022 All-Ireland SFC quarter-final exit to Kerry was followed within hours by Horan's resignation as manager.

Sporting positions
Preceded by John O'Mahony	Mayo Senior Football Manager; 2010–2014	Succeeded by Noel Connelly and Pat Holmes
Preceded by Stephen Rochford	Mayo Senior Football Manager; 2018–2022	Succeeded by Kevin McStay
