= Conor Lane =

Gaelic football referee

Conor Lane is a Gaelic football referee. He is a member of the Banteer/Lyre club in County Cork and has refereed three All-Ireland SFC finals.

== Career ==
Conor Lane was appointed to the national panel of referees for the senior championship panel in 2012. In 2013, he refereed the All-Ireland Minor final.

The Derry manager severely criticised Lane after the team exited the 2015 All-Ireland SFC to Galway.

In March 2016, he officiated at his first Club Senior Final in Croke Park when Ballyboden played Castlebar Mitchels in the All-Ireland Senior Club Football Championship final.

Lane was chosen as the referee for the 2016 All-Ireland Senior Football Championship Final (drawn game) between Dublin and Mayo; He was chosen as the referee for the 2018 All-Ireland Senior Football Championship Final between Dublin and Tyrone, his second All-Ireland final in three years.

Lane also took charge of the 2019 All-Ireland Senior Football Championship Final replay between Dublin and Kerry.

Lane would also referee the 2021 All Ireland semi-final between Mayo and Dublin.

Notable games Conor Lane has officiated in include:

2 All-Ireland Club Football Championship Finals (2016 and 2020)

1 All-Ireland Minor Football Championship Final (2013)

1 Sigerson Cup Final (2017)

3 Connacht Senior Football Championship Finals (2013, 2016 and 2021)

1 Ulster Senior Football Championship Final (2019)

1 Leinster Senior Football Championship Final (2023)

1 Allianz League Division 1 Final (2024)

2 All-Ireland Senior Football Championship semi-finals (2019 and 2021)

5 Cork County Senior Football Championship Finals (2009, 2014, 2017, 2018 and 2020)

His umpires since he made the breakthrough at inter-county level include his father, John Joe Lane (2016 and 2018 finals), DJ O'Sullivan (2016, 2018 and 2019 finals), Pat Kelly (2016, 2018 and 2019 finals), Raymond Hegarty (2016, 2018 and 2019 finals), Kevin Roche (2019 final), Ger Fleming (2013 Minor Final) and Denis Healy.
