= Markievicz Park =

GAA stadium in County Sligo, Ireland

- Páirc Markiewicz
- Interactive map of Markievicz Park
- Location: Cairns Road, Sligo, County Sligo, F91 NT02, Ireland
- Coordinates: 54°15′27.11″N 8°27′52.04″W
- Public transit: Sligo Mac Diarmada railway station
- Owner: Sligo GAA
- Capacity: 18,558 (2009–present)
- Field size: 142 x 90 m
- Surface: Grass

Construction
- Opened: 1955
- Renovated: 2009

Markievicz Park (Irish: Páirc Marcievicz) is the principal GAA stadium in County Sligo, Ireland, home to the Sligo Gaelic football and hurling teams. Built in 1955 in Sligo town (due mostly to Seán Forde who single-handedly gathered the funds necessary to build the stadium), it is named after Constance Markievicz, one of the participants of the 1916 Easter Rising, the first woman elected to Dáil Éireann and the first female elected to the British parliament, although she refused to take up her seat there.

A ten-year project to redevelop Markievicz Park completed work in 2009 and cost €2.4 million. This raised the safe capacity from 10,500 to 18,558 (3,585 seated under a covered stand, 14,936 standing terraced and 37 disabled spectator places).

On 25 July 2003, Irish vocal pop band Westlife held a concert for their Unbreakable Tour, supporting their album Unbreakable - The Greatest Hits Vol. 1.

== See also ==
- List of Gaelic Athletic Association stadiums
- List of stadiums in Ireland by capacity
- Markievicz Park, Ballyfermot, Dublin
