= Elverys Sports =

Irish sports retailer

Elverys Sports Ltd
- Company type: Limited Company (Ltd.)
- Industry: Clothing and consumer goods manufacture
- Founded: 1847 as Elverys Sports
- Founder: J.W. Elvery, Staunton Family
- Headquarters: Moneen, Castlebar, County Mayo, Ireland
- Area served: Ireland
- Products: Footwear, sportswear, sports equipment
- Revenue: €129.24 million (2023)
- Net income: €7.11 million (2023)
- Number of employees: >700 (2014)
- Website: www.elverys.ie

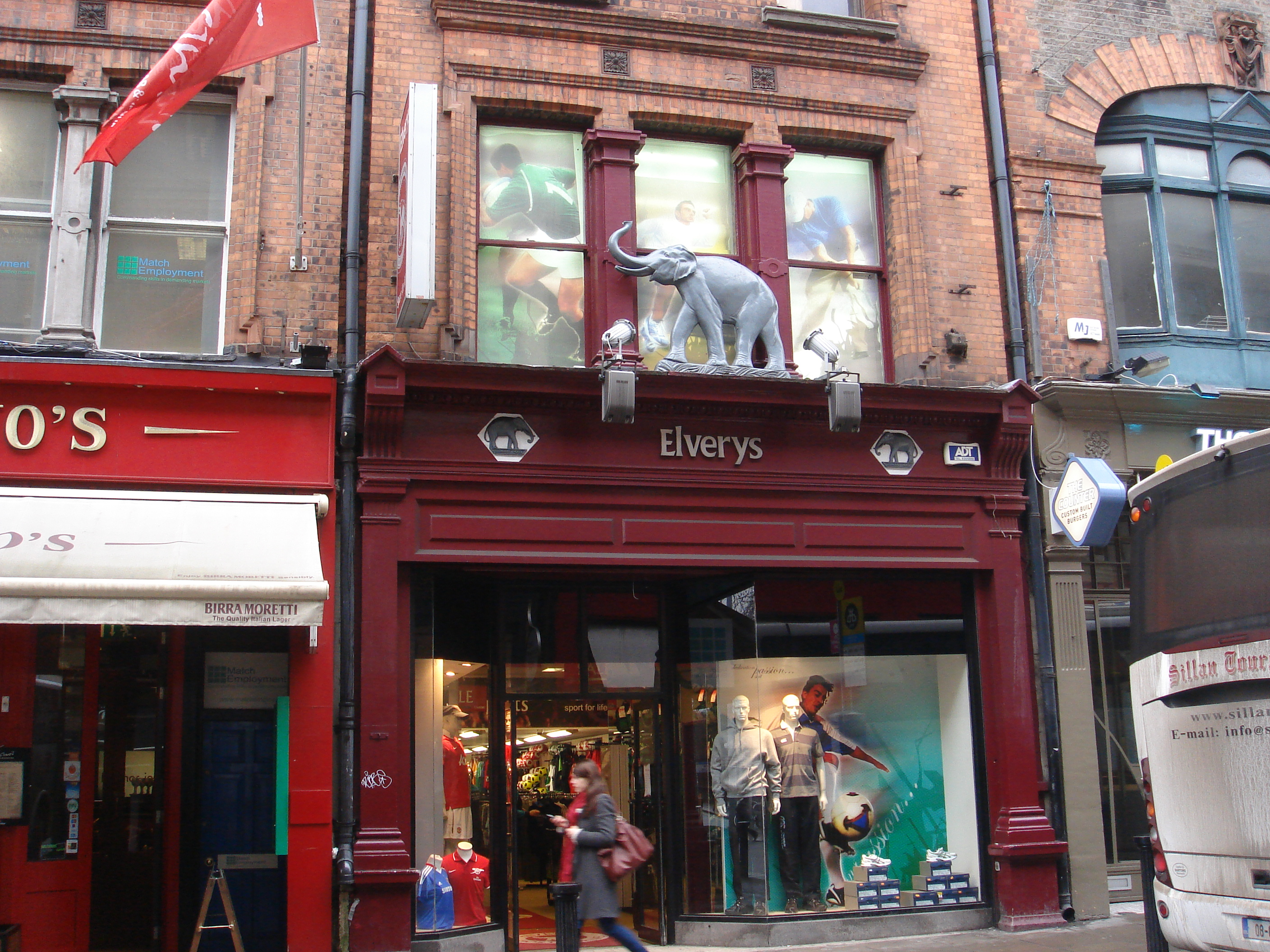
Elverys Sports on Suffolk Street, Dublin

Elverys Sports is a sports shop chain in Ireland. Founded in 1847, it is Ireland's oldest sports retailer. Elverys sell sports clothes and equipment, both third-party and own brand goods.

== History ==
Elverys was founded in 1847, and is Ireland's oldest sports retailer.

On 11 November 1850, Elverys opened a shop at 46 Lower O'Connell Street (then known as Sackville Street). The building had previously housed a business that displayed wild animals and was known as Elephant House. It had a statue of an elephant over the door, which became the Elverys symbol.

In 1894, Elverys expanded into the building next door, Number 47. During an attempt to move the golden elephant statue to a new plinth over the new door, it fell to the ground and was destroyed. A new elephant statue was commissioned and installed in its place. The building was sold in 1954. The elephant statue was removed, but the plinth on which it once stood remains visible, over the door of the Supermac's restaurant that now occupies the building.

Elverys opened further shops in Dublin's Abbey Street, in Cork and in London in the late 19th century.

The business was taken over by Staunton Sports in 1998, has gone from one shop to 46 nationwide since the takeover. The company has over 700 employees.

== Products ==
In its early years, Elverys specialised in the manufacture and sale of waterproof fabrics and garments, and gained a reputation for attire for outdoor activities and sports. Later in the 1850s, during the Crimean War, it marketed its products to soldiers who were being posted to the war. Elverys created a proto-sleeping bag known as the Crimea Wrapper.

Today, Elverys offers equipment and sportswear for Gaelic games, soccer, golf, rugby, basketball and other sports. It also stocks exercise equipment such as treadmills and walkers.
