= 2024 All-Ireland Senior Football Championship =

Championship details
- Dates: 6 April – 28 July 2024
- Teams: 31

All-Ireland Champions
- Winning team: Armagh (2nd win)
- Captain: Aidan Forker
- Manager: Kieran McGeeney

All-Ireland Finalists
- Losing team: Galway
- Captain: Seán Kelly
- Manager: Pádraic Joyce

Provincial Champions
- Munster: Kerry
- Leinster: Dublin
- Ulster: Donegal
- Connacht: Galway

Championship statistics
- Top Scorer: Ryan O'Donoghue (3–48)

The 2024 All-Ireland Senior Football Championship (SFC) was the 138th edition of the Gaelic Athletic Association's premier inter-county Gaelic football tournament since its establishment in 1887. Thirty-one of the thirty-two Irish counties took part – Kilkenny did not compete, while London and New York completed the lineup.

The championship worked as a two-tier system for the third time, with the Tailteann Cup being the second-tier competition for those that do not qualify for the Sam Maguire Cup competition.

The draws for the championship took place on 21 October 2023. The final was played on 28 July 2024 at Croke Park in Dublin, between Armagh and Connacht champion Galway. Armagh won a second title, with a 1–11 to 0–13 win against Galway in that game.

== Format ==
=== Provincial championships ===
Connacht, Leinster, Munster and Ulster each organise a provincial championship. All provincial matches are knock-out.

=== Group stage format ===
Sixteen teams progress to the All-Ireland Championship round-robin:

- The four provincial champions
- The four beaten provincial finalists
- The 2023 Tailteann Cup winners (Meath)
- The seven next-ranked teams, based on final position in the 2024 National Football League
  - Position is based on standing after promotion and relegation are applied and after finals are played; therefore, the top two teams in Division 2 outrank the bottom two teams in Division 1, and if the 2nd placed team in Division 2 wins the final, they are ranked above the 1st-place finishers who lost the final.
  - If Meath reaches the Leinster final, an 8th team will be chosen based on league position.

The other 17 county teams compete in the 2024 Tailteann Cup.

In the All-Ireland Championship round-robin, 16 teams are drawn into four groups of four teams. Each team plays the other in its group once, earning 2 points for a win and 1 for a draw. Each team plays one home, one away, and one neutral fixture.

The top three in each group advance to the knockout stages, first-place teams to the All-Ireland quarter-finals, and second and third-placed teams to the preliminary quarter-finals.

=== Knockout stage format ===
The four second-placed teams play against the third-placed teams in the preliminary quarter-finals. The winners of the preliminary quarter-finals advance to play the group winners in the All-Ireland quarter-finals. Two semi-finals and a final follow. All matches are knock-out.

== Teams ==
Thirty-three counties competed in the All-Ireland Senior Football Championship: seven teams in the Connacht Senior Football Championship, eleven teams in the Leinster Senior Football Championship, six teams in the Munster Senior Football Championship and nine teams in the Ulster Senior Football Championship.

County	Last provincial title	Last championship title	Position in 2023 championship	Current championship
Antrim	1951	—	Tailteann Cup semi-finals (19th–20th)	Ulster Senior Football Championship
Armagh	2008	2002	Quarter-finals (5th–8th)	Ulster Senior Football Championship
Carlow	1944	—	Tailteann Cup quarter-finals (21st–24th)	Leinster Senior Football Championship
Cavan	2020	1952	Tailteann Cup quarter-finals (21st–24th)	Ulster Senior Football Championship
Clare	1992	—	All-Ireland group stage (13th–16th)	Munster Senior Football Championship
Cork	2012	2010	Quarter-finals (5th–8th)	Munster Senior Football Championship
Derry	2023	1993	Semi-finals (3rd–4th)	Ulster Senior Football Championship
Donegal	2019	2012	Preliminary quarter-finals (9th–12th)	Ulster Senior Football Championship
Down	1994	1994	Tailteann Cup finalists (18th)	Ulster Senior Football Championship
Dublin	2023	2023	All-Ireland champions (1st)	Leinster Senior Football Championship
Fermanagh	—	—	Tailteann Cup preliminary quarter-finals (25th–28th)	Ulster Senior Football Championship
Galway	2023	2001	Preliminary quarter-finals (9th–12th)	Connacht Senior Football Championship
Kerry	2023	2022	Finalists (2nd)	Munster Senior Football Championship
Kildare	2000	1928	Preliminary quarter-finals (9th–12th)	Leinster Senior Football Championship
Laois	2003	—	Tailteann Cup semi-finals (19th–20th)	Leinster Senior Football Championship
Leitrim	1994	—	Tailteann Cup group stage (29th–33rd)	Connacht Senior Football Championship
Limerick	1896	1896	Tailteann Cup quarter-finals (21st–24th)	Munster Senior Football Championship
London	—	—	Tailteann Cup group stage (29th–33rd)	Connacht Senior Football Championship
Longford	1968	—	Tailteann Cup preliminary quarter-finals (25th–28th)	Leinster Senior Football Championship
Louth	1957	1957	All-Ireland group stage (13th–16th)	Leinster Senior Football Championship
Mayo	2021	1951	Quarter-finals (5th–8th)	Connacht Senior Football Championship
Meath	2010	1999	Tailteann Cup winners (17th)	Leinster Senior Football Championship
Monaghan	2015	—	Semi-finals (3rd–4th)	Ulster Senior Football Championship
New York	—	—	Tailteann Cup preliminary quarter-finals (25th–28th)	Connacht Senior Football Championship
Offaly	1997	1982	Tailteann Cup preliminary quarter-finals (25th–28th)	Leinster Senior Football Championship
Roscommon	2019	1944	Preliminary quarter-finals (9th–12th)	Connacht Senior Football Championship
Sligo	2007	—	All-Ireland group stage (13th–16th)	Connacht Senior Football Championship
Tipperary	2020	1920	Tailteann Cup group stage (29th–33rd)	Munster Senior Football Championship
Tyrone	2021	2021	Quarter-finals (5th–8th)	Ulster Senior Football Championship
Waterford	1898	—	Tailteann Cup group stage (29th–33rd)	Munster Senior Football Championship
Westmeath	2004	—	All-Ireland group stage (13th–16th)	Leinster Senior Football Championship
Wexford	1945	1918	Tailteann Cup quarter-finals (21st–24th)	Leinster Senior Football Championship
Wicklow	—	—	Tailteann Cup group stage (29th–33rd)	Leinster Senior Football Championship

== Provincial championships ==
=== Connacht Senior Football Championship ===
Quarter-finals

Semi-finals

Final

Leitrim
0-06

Sligo
0-15

Sligo
0-14

Galway
1-13

London
0-09

Galway
5-21

Galway
0-16

Mayo
0-15

Roscommon
0-13

Mayo
1-15

New York
2-06

Mayo
2-21

==== Quarter-finals ====
6 April 2024 Quarter-final	London	0–09 – 5–21	Galway	Ruislip
15:00	Gallagher 0-3f, Clarke 0–2, Rafter 0–2, Driver 0–1, Rafferty 0–1	Report	Culhane 2–0, Conroy 1–3, D'Arcy 1–2, Finnerty 0–4 (1m), Ó Curraoin 0–4 (3f), Sweeney 1–1, Heaney 0–4, Daly 0–1, McHugh 0–1, Silke 0–1	Stadium: McGovern Park; Referee: Liam Devenney (Mayo)

7 April 2024 Quarter-final	Leitrim	0–06 – 0–15	Sligo	Carrick-on-Shannon
15:30	O'Rourke 0–2, Rooney 0–2, Dolan 0–1, Sweeney 0–1	Report	Murphy 0-4f, Mullen 0–3, Cummins 0–2, Mulligan 0–2, Gordon 0–1, McLoughlin 0–1, Quinn 0–1	Stadium: Páirc Seán Mac Diarmada; Attendance: 4,117; Referee: Keiran Eannetta (Tyrone)

7 April 2024 Quarter-final	New York	2–06 – 2–21	Mayo	New York
15:00 EDT (UTC-4)	O'Reilly 1–2 (1m), Boyle 1–0, Butler 0–2, Wharton 0–1, Brosnan 0–1	Report	O'Donoghue 1–13 (9f), O'Connor 1–1 (1-0p), Carney 0–2, Boland 0–1, Durcan 0–1, O'Shea 0–1(1f), McHale 0–1, Towey 0–1	Stadium: Gaelic Park; Referee: Martin McNally (Monaghan)

==== Semi-finals ====
20 April 2024 Semi-final	Sligo	0–14 – 1–13	Galway	Sligo
15:30	Murphy 0–3 (1f, 1m), O'Connor 0–3, Alan McLoughlin 0–2, Carrabine 0–1, Cummins 0–1, Gordon 0–1, Lally 0–1, Nathan Mullen 0–1, Mulligan 0–1	Report	Finnerty 1–5 (1f), Darcy 0–2, Comer 0–2, Heaney 0–1, McHugh 0–1, Molloy 0–1, Walsh 0–1	Stadium: Markievicz Park; Attendance: 4,597; Referee: Barry Tiernan (Dublin)

21 April 2024 Semi-final	Roscommon	0–13 – 1–15	Mayo	Roscommon
16:00	Murtagh 0–5 (2f), Cregg 0–4 (2f), Daly 0–1, O'Carroll 0–1, Smith 0–1	Report	O'Donoghue 0–7 (3f, 1m), O'Shea 1–1, Boland 0–2, Conroy 0–2, Loftus 0–2, Durcan 0–1	Stadium: Dr Hyde Park; Attendance: 13,967; Referee: Séan Hurson (Tyrone)

==== Final ====
5 May 2024 Final	Galway	0–16 – 0–15	Mayo	Galway
16:00	Finnerty 0–8 (5f), Walsh 0–3 (1f), Gleeson 0-2f, Comer 0–2, Heaney 0–1	Report	O'Donoghue 0–6 (4f, 1m), Ruane 0–3, Conroy 0–2, Boland 0–1, McHugh 0–1, Flynn 0–1, O'Connor 0–1	Stadium: Pearse Stadium; Attendance: 19,193; Referee: David Gough Meath; Man of the Match: Damien Comer

=== Leinster Senior Football Championship ===
Preliminary round

Quarter-finals

Semi-finals

Final

Dublin
3-19

Longford
3-12

Meath
0-12

Meath
3-19

Dublin
3-22

Offaly
0-11

Laois
1-08

Offaly
2-13

Dublin
1-19

Westmeath
1-11

Louth
2-12

Wicklow
2-09

Kildare
0-16

Wicklow
1-12

Kildare
0-13

Carlow
0-08

Louth
0-17

Wexford
4-19

Louth
4-10

Wexford
0-15

==== Preliminary round ====
7 April 2024 Preliminary round	Longford	3–12 – 3–19	Meath	Longford
15:00	Matthews 1–3 (1f), Hughes 1–2 (2f), Gallagher 1–1(1f), De Reynolds 0–1, Quinn 0–1, Hagan 0–1, Da Reynolds 0–1, Farrell 0–1	Report	Conlon 1–6, Frayne 1–5 (1-0p, 1f), Morris 0–4, McBride 1–0, Caulfield 0–1, Jones 0–1, Walsh 0–1, Hickey 0–1	Stadium: Pearse Park; Attendance: ~2,500; Referee: Niall Cullen (Fermanagh)

7 April 2024 Preliminary round	Westmeath	1–11 – 2–09	Wicklow	Portlaoise
15:30	Loughlin 0–5 (3f), Lynam 1–0, Forde 0–2 (1f), Heslin 0–2(1f), McCartan 0–1, O'Toole 0–1	Report	Healy 1–2, JP Nolan 1–2(1 '45), O'Brien 0–3, Quinn 0–2(2f)	Stadium: O'Moore Park; Referee: Paddy Neilan (Roscommon)

7 April 2024 Preliminary round	Wexford	4–19 – 0–08	Carlow	Wexford
14:30	Rossiter 2–2(1m), S Nolan 1–7(6f, 1m), Bealin 1–0, Brosnan 0–3, Coleman 0–2, O'Grady 0–2, Hughes 0–1, E Nolan 0–1	Report	Hulton 0–4 (2f), Amond 0–1, Doyle 0–1(1f), Dunphy 0–1, Crowley 0–1	Stadium: Wexford Park; Attendance: 1,250; Referee: Derek O'Mahoney (Tipperary)

==== Quarter-finals ====
13 April 2024 Quarter-final	Laois	1–08 – 2–13	Offaly	Portlaoise
19:00	Fitzpatrick 1–0, O'Carroll 0–3 (2f), Barry 0–2, Roche 0–2, Buggie 0–1,	Report	O'Neill 1–3, Hyland 0–5 (4f), Bryant 0–3 (2f), Hayes 1–0, McNamee 0–1, Pearson 0–1	Stadium: O'Moore Park; Referee: Jerome Henry (Mayo)

14 April 2024 Quarter-final	Kildare	0–16 – 1–12	Wicklow	Portlaoise
13:45	Feely 0–7 (5f), Kelly 0–3, Kirwan 0–2, Woodgate 0–2 (1f), Masterson 0–1, Sargent 0–1	Report	McGraynor 1–1 (1f,1p), Healy 0–2, O'Brien 0–2, Quinn 0–2, Fee 0–1, Nolan 0–1, Moran 0–1, Murphy 0–1, O'Keane 0–1	Stadium: O'Moore Park; Referee: Sean Lonergan (Tipperary)

14 April 2024 Quarter-final	Louth	4–10 – 0–15	Wexford	Portlaoise
16:00	Mulroy 2–4 (1-0p, 4f), Downey 2–0, Durnin 0–2, Burns 0–1, Grimes 0-1m, L Jackson 0–1, T Jackson 0–1	Report	Cullen 0–3, Nolan 0–3 (2f), Coleman 0–2 (1'45), Hughes 0–2, Malone 0–2, Rossiter 0–2, O'Grady 0–1,	Stadium: O'Moore Park; Referee: Seamus Mulhare (Laois)

14 April 2024 Quarter-final	Dublin	3–19 – 0–12	Meath	Dublin
16:30	Mannion 1–6 (3f), O'Callaghan 1–2 (1m), Bugler 1–0, Kilkenny 0–3, Basquel 0–2, J Small 0–2, Costello 0–1, Murphy 0–1, Scully 0-1m, P Small 0–1,	Report	Frayne 0–3 (2f), Morris 0–3, Caulfield 0–1, Champion 0–1, Conlon 0–1, Costello 0-1f, Hogan 0–1 (1'45), Jones 0-1m,	Stadium: Croke Park; Attendance: 21,445; Referee: Thomas Murphy Galway GAA

==== Semi-finals ====
28 April 2024 Semi-final	Kildare	0–13 – 0–17	Louth	Dublin
13:45	Feely 0–4 (2f), Farrell 0-3f, Kirwan 0–2, Woodgate 0-2f, Archbold 0–1, Flynn 0–1	Report	Mulroy 0–7 (4f, 1'45), Durnin 0–2, Grimes 0–2, Lennon 0–2, Burns 0–1, Downey 0–1, Mathews 0–1, Sharkey 0–1	Stadium: Croke Park; Attendance: 21,957; Referee: Conor Lane (Cork)

28 April 2024 Semi-final	Dublin	3–22 – 0–11	Offaly	Dublin
16:00	Basquel 1–3 (1f), O'Callaghan 1–2, Costello 0–4 (2f), Scully 1–1, Mannion 0–3, O'Dell 0–2, Small 0–2, Fenton 0–1, MacMahon 0–1, McGinnis 0–1, Murphy 0–1, Kilkenny 0–1	Report	Hyland 0–5 (2f, 1'45), O'Neill 0–3 (1m), Flynn 0–1, Hayes 0–1, Pearson 0–1	Stadium: Croke Park; Attendance: 21,957; Referee: Paul Faloon (Down)

==== Final ====
12 May 2024 Final	Dublin	1–19 – 2–12	Louth	Dublin
13:45	O'Callaghan 1-04 (1m), Costello 0–6 (4f), Fenton 0–3, Basquel 0–1, Bugler 0–1, Lahiff 0–1, Mannion 0–1, Kilkenny 0–1, P Small 0–1	Report	Mulroy 0–6 (5f), Grimes 0–4, Keenan 1–0, Lennon 1–0, Downey 0–1, Durnin 0–1	Stadium: Croke Park; Attendance: 23,113; Referee: Noel Mooney (Cavan)

=== Munster Senior Football Championship ===
Quarter-finals

Semi-finals

Final

Waterford
1-09

Clare
2-20

Waterford
2-07

Tipperary
1-05

Clare
1-13

Kerry
0-23

Cork
3-13

Limerick
0-11

Kerry
0-18

Cork
1-12

==== Quarter-finals ====
7 April 2024 Quarter-final	Waterford	2–07 – 1–05	Tipperary	Dungarvan
14:00	O'Connell 2–3 (3f), S Curry 0–3, J Curry 0-1f	Report	Stokes 1–0, Doyle 0–1, Grogan 0–1, McGarry 0–1, Quigley 0–1, Sweeney 0–1	Stadium: Fraher Field; Attendance: 1,071; Referee: Brendan Griffin (Kerry)

7 April 2024 Quarter-final	Cork	3–13 – 0–11	Limerick	Cork
14:00	Jones 1–2, Hurley 0–4(3f), Deane 1–0, Maguire 1–0, Fahy 0–2, Corbett 0–1, O'Driscoll 0–1, O'Mahony 0–1, Taylor 0–1, Sherlock 0–1	Report	Naughton 0–4 (1f, 2'45), Rigter 0–2, B Childs 0–1, T Childs 0–1, Costello 0-1m, Nash 0-1f, Nix 0–1	Stadium: Páirc Uí Chaoimh; Attendance: 4,062; Referee: Fergal Kelly (Longford)

==== Semi-finals ====
20 April 2024 Semi-final	Waterford	1–09 – 2–20	Clare	Dungarvan
18:00	O'Connell 1–1 (1f), Dunwoody 0–3 (2f), Curry 0–2 (1f), Browne 0–1, McGrath 0–1, Whelan-Barrett 0–1	Report	McMahon 1–3 (1f), Griffin 0–5, McInerney 1–2 (1f), Downes 0–4 (1'45), Bohannon 0–2, O'Donnell 0–2, Coughlan 0–1, Murray 0–1	Stadium: Fraher Field; Attendance: 1,504; Referee: David Murnane (Cork)

20 April 2024 Semi-final	Kerry	0–18 – 1–12	Cork	Killarney
16:00	O'Shea 0–6 (3f), Clifford 0–4 (1f), T O'Sullivan 0–3, Moynihan 0–2, Burke 0–1, Geaney 0–1, G O'Sullivan 0–1	Report	Hurley 0–8 (4f), Walsh 1–0, Corbett 0–2 (1f), Jones 0–1, Taylor 0–1	Stadium: Fitzgerald Stadium; Attendance: 17,568; Referee: Noel Mooney (Cavan)

==== Final ====
5 May 2024 Final	Clare	1–13 – 0–23	Kerry	Ennis
13:45	McMahon 0–5 (4f), Ugwueru 1–0, Downes 0–2 (1f,1 '45), Griffin 0–2, Coughlan 0–1, McInerney 0–1, Murray 0–1, Walsh 0–1,	Report	O'Shea 0–9 (4f,1 '45, 1m), Clifford 0–4 (1f, 1m), Brosnan 0–3, Clifford 0–2, Foley 0–1, Geaney 0–1, Moynihan 0–1, Ó Beaglaoich 0–1, O'Sullivan 0–1	Stadium: Cusack Park; Attendance: 12,059; Referee: Fergal Kelly (Longford); Man of the Match: Tony Brosnan

=== Ulster Senior Football Championship ===
Preliminary round

Quarter-finals

Semi-finals

Final

Down
0–13

Antrim
0–9

Down
2–6

Armagh
0–13

Fermanagh
0–9

Armagh
3–11

Armagh
0–20 (5)

Donegal
0–20 (6)

Derry
0–17

Donegal
4–11

Donegal
0–18

Monaghan
1–12

Tyrone
0–16

Cavan
3–12

Cavan
3–16

Tyrone
1–23*

==== Preliminary round ====
7 April 2024 Preliminary round	Monaghan	1–12 – 3–12	Cavan	Clones
16:00	Hamill 1–0, Beggan 0–3 (1f, 1 '45), McManus 0–3 (2f), McCarron 0–2(1f), O'Connell 0–1, Garland 0–1, Wilson 0–1, Jones 0–1(1m)	Report	Lynch 1–9 (7f, 1 '45), G Smith 1–1, Faulkner 1–0, O'Connell 0–1, Madden 0–1	Stadium: St Tiernach's Park; Attendance: 8,324; Referee: Brendan Cawley (Kildare); Man of the Match: Pádraig Faulkner (CAV)

==== Quarter-finals ====
13 April 2024 Quarter-final	Down	0–13 – 0–09	Antrim	Newry
18:00	Savage 0–3 (2f,1m), Guinness 0–2, Annett 0–1, Doherty 0–1, Havern 0-1f, Johnston 0-1m, Kerr 0–1, McEvoy 0–1, Murdock 0–1, Rooney 0–1	Report	McQuillan 0–3 (2f), Byrne 0–1, Hand 0–1, Jordan 0–1, McBride 0–1, McCabe 0–1, McCann 0-1f	Stadium: Páirc Esler; Attendance: 5,429; Referee: Barry Cassidy (Derry)

14 April 2024 Quarter-final	Fermanagh	0–09 – 3–11	Armagh	Enniskillen
14:00	Love 0–2, O'Brien 0–2, Cassidy 0-1f, Jones 0-1f, Kelm 0–1, McGee 0–1, McShea 0–1	Report	Campbell 1–2, Burns 1–1, Turbitt 1–0, Mackin 0–2, Murnin 0–2, Grugan 0-1f, McCambridge 0–1, O O'Neill 0–1, R O'Neill 0–1	Stadium: Brewster Park; Attendance: 7,096; Referee: Joe McQuillan, (Cavan)

20 April 2024 Quarter-final	Derry	0–17 – 4–11	Donegal	Derry
18:15	E Doherty 0–4, McGuigan 0–4 (2f), Cassidy 0–2 (1m), Rogers 0–2, C Doherty 0–1, McKaigue 0–1, McKinless 0–1, Murray 0–1, Toner 0–1,	Report	Ó Baoill 2–1, Gallen 1–3 (1p,1f,1'45), Brennan 1–0, McHugh 0–2, McBrearty 0-1f, Mogan 0–1, Moore 0–1, N O'Donnell 0–1, Thompson 0–1	Stadium: Celtic Park; Attendance: 14,714; Referee: David Gough (Meath)

21 April 2024 Quarter-final	Cavan	3–16 – 1–23 (a.e.t.)	Tyrone	Cavan
16:00	Lynch 0–5 (3f), Madden 1–1, O Brady 0–3, Carolan 1–0, Faulkner 1–0, Madden 0–2, O'Connell 0–2, K Brady 0–1, Fortune 0–1, Smith 0–1	Report	D Canavan 0–7 (3f), McCurry 0–4 (2f), Gray 1–0, McKernan 0–3, R Canavan 0–2, Cullen 0–1, Daly 0–1, Devlin 0–1, Donnelly 0–1, Kennedy 0–1, Morgan 0–1 (1f), Quinn 0-1f	Stadium: Breffni Park; Attendance: 9,952; Referee: David Coldrick Meath

==== Semi-final ====
27 April 2024 Semi-final	Down	2–6 – 0–13	Armagh	Clones
16:00	Magill 1–1, Havern 0–2 (2f), Guiness 0–1, Johnston 0–1, Mgaill 0–1	Report	Grugan 0–5 (5f), Burns 1–0 (og.), R O'Neill 0–3 (1f), Forker 0–2, Duffy 0–1, O O'Neill 0–1, Nugent 0–1	Stadium: St Tiernach's Park; Attendance: 12,116; Referee: Liam Devenney (Mayo)

28 April 2024 Semi-final	Donegal	0–18 – 0–16 (a.e.t.)	Tyrone	Derry
14:00	Gallen 0–3 (3f), McBrearty 0–2 (1f), McGee 0–2, Ó Baoill 0–2, S O'Donnell 0–2, Thompson 0–2 (1f), McGonagle 0–1, Mac Ceallabhuí 0–1, McCole 0–1, Mogan 0–1, N O'Donnell 0–1	Report	Canavan 0–4 (1f,1m), Morgan 0–3 (3f), Daly 0–2, McCurry 0–2 (2f), McKernan 0–2, O'Donnell 0–1, Donnelly 0–1, McShane 0–1	Stadium: Celtic Park; Attendance: 14,714; Referee: Brendan Cawley (Kildare)

==== Final ====
12 May 2024 Final	Armagh	0–20 – 0–20 (a.e.t.) (5–6 p)	Donegal	Clones
16:00	Turbitt 0–4, Nugent 0–3 (1f), Campbell 0–2, Conaty 0–2, Crealey 0–2 (1m), Murnin 0–2, Forker 0–1, Grugan 0–1, Mackin 0–1, O O'Neill 0–1 (1m), R O'Neill 0–1 (1m)	Report	Gallen 0–6 (2f), Ó Baoill 0–2, N O'Donnell 0–2, S O'Donnell 0–2, McBrearty 0–2 (1f), Mogan 0–2, O Doherty 0–1, Langan 0–1, McGee 0–1, Mac Ceallabhuí 0–1	Stadium: St Tiernach's Park; Attendance: 28,896; Referee: Martin McNally (Monaghan)
	Penalties
	S McPartland; O Conaty; C Turbitt; A Nugent; T Kelly; S McPartland (penalty missed)		C Thompson; A Doherty; M Langan; J McGee; D Ó Baoill; A Doherty

== Team allocation and draw ==
=== Team allocation ===
Seven places in the All-Ireland group stage were allocated based on performance in the 2024 National Football League, as detailed below.

Key to colours
Qualified for round-robin phase	by reaching provincial final
Qualified for round-robin phase	by winning 2023 Tailteann Cup
Qualified for round-robin phase	based on NFL position
Compete in 2024 Tailteann Cup	

Position	Team
NFL champions	Derry
NFL finalists	Dublin
3rd Div 1	Kerry
4th Div 1	Mayo
5th Div 1	Tyrone
6th Div 1	Galway
Div 2 champions	Donegal
Div 2 finalists	Armagh
7th Div 1	Roscommon
8th Div 1	Monaghan
3rd Div 2	Cavan
4th Div 2	Cork
5th Div 2	Meath
6th Div 2	Louth
Div 3 champions	Westmeath
Div 3 finalists	Down
7th Div 2	Fermanagh
8th Div 2	Kildare
3rd Div 3	Clare
4th Div 3	Sligo
5th Div 3	Antrim
6th Div 3	Offaly
Div 4 champions	Laois
Div 4 finalists	Leitrim
7th Div 3	Wicklow
8th Div 3	Limerick
3rd Div 4	Wexford
4th Div 4	Longford
5th Div 4	Carlow
6th Div 4	Tipperary
7th Div 4	London
8th Div 4	Waterford
Did not enter	New York

=== Group stage draw ===
Number in brackets indicates ranking in the 2024 NFL.

==== Pot 1 ====
- Dublin (2)
- Kerry (3)
- Galway (6)
- Donegal (7)

==== Pot 2 ====
- Mayo (4)
- Armagh (8)
- Louth (14)
- Clare (19)

==== Pot 3 ====
- Derry (1)
- Tyrone (5)
- Roscommon (9)
- Monaghan (10)

==== Pot 4 ====
- Cavan (11)
- Cork (12)
- Meath (13)
- Westmeath (15)

== Group stage ==
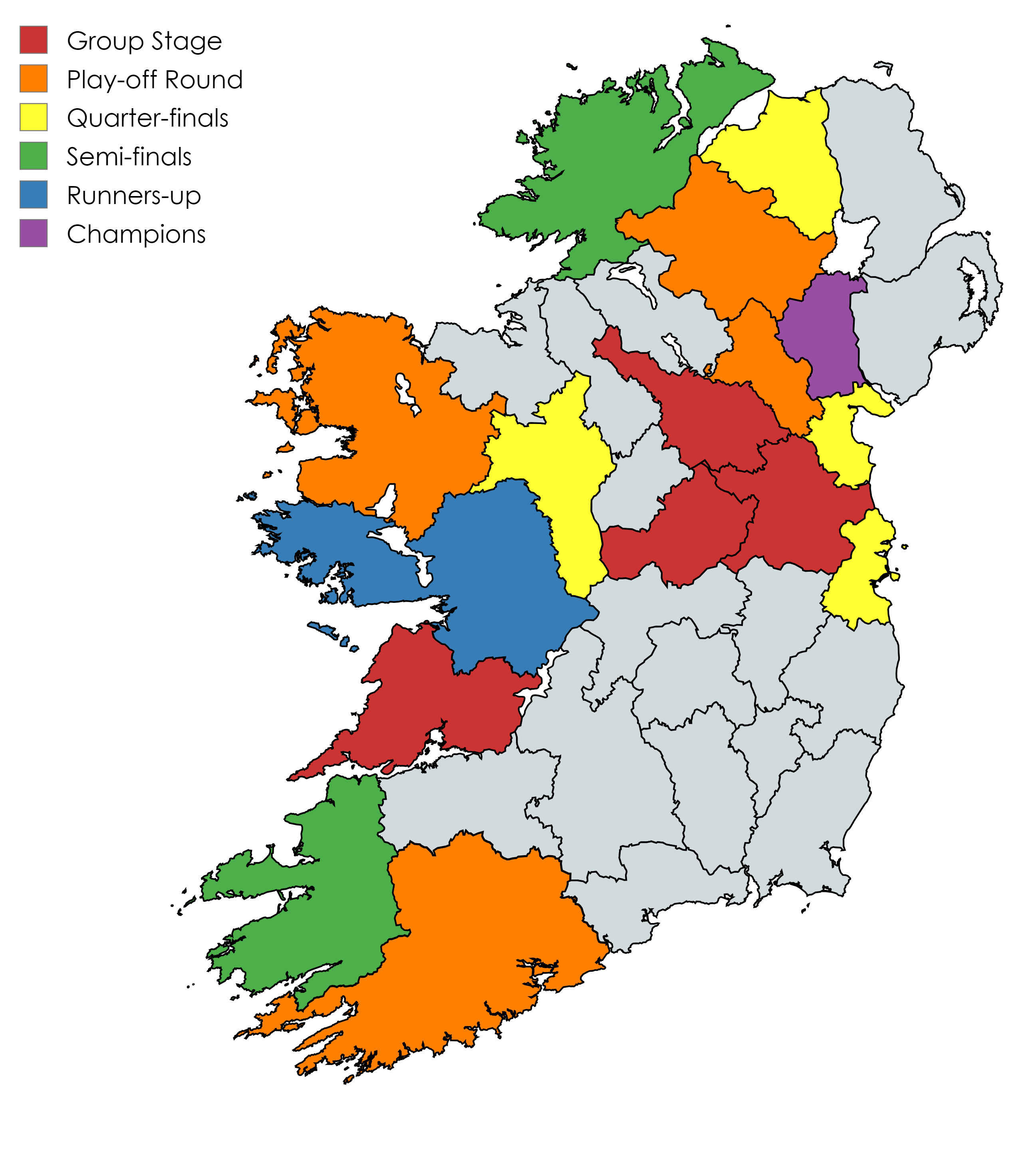
Results of teams participating in the 2024 All-Ireland Senior Football Championship

=== Group 1 ===
Pos	Team	Pld	W	D	L	PF	PA	PD	Pts	Qualification
1	Armagh	3	2	1	0	57	41	+16	5	Advance to quarter-final
2	Galway	3	2	1	0	50	41	+9	5	Advance to preliminary quarter-final
3	Derry	3	1	0	2	43	55	−12	2	Advance to preliminary quarter-final
4	Westmeath	3	0	0	3	31	44	−13	0	

Source: GAA

==== Round 1 ====
18 May 2024 Round 1	Galway	2–14 – 0–15	Derry	Salthill
17:30	Finnerty 0–4 (2f), Conroy 0–3, Darcy 1–0, Kelly 1–0, Daly 0–2, Walsh 0–2, Heaney 0–1, Ó Curraoin 0–1, Tierney 0–1	Report	McGuigan 0–4 (1f), Murray 0–3, McFaul 0–2, Bradley 0–1, Cassidy 0–1, Doherty 0–1, Gilmore 0–1, Glass 0–1, Rogers 0–1	Stadium: Pearse Stadium; Attendance: 7,602; Referee: Brendan Cawley (Kildare)

25 May 2024 Round 1	Armagh	0–16 – 0–11	Westmeath	Armagh
18:00	Grugan 0–5 (3f), Conaty 0–2, Nugent 0–2 (1f), Turbitt 0–2 (2f), Campbell 0–1, Kelly 0–1, Ciaran Mackin 0–1, Murnin 0–1, Conor O'Neill 0–1	Report	Heslin 0–3 (3f), Maguire 0–2, McCartan 0–2, O'Toole 0–2, Forde 0–1, Loughlin 0–1	Stadium: Athletic Grounds; Attendance: 5,989; Referee: Conor Lane (Cork)

==== Round 2 ====
2 June 2024 Round 2	Westmeath	0–11 – 1–12	Galway	Mullingar
15:00	Heslin 0-5f, Wallace 0–2, Connellan 0–1, Forde 0–1, Lynch 0–1, McCartan 0–1	Report	Walsh 1–4 (3f), Gleeson 0–2 (2'45), Tierney 0–2, Darcy 0–1, Hernon 0–1, McDaid 0–1, Molloy 0–1	Stadium: TEG Cusack Park; Referee: Niall Cullen (Fermanagh)

2 June 2024 Round 2	Derry	0–15 – 3–17	Armagh	Derry
16:00	McGuigan 0–7 (4f), Glass 0–3 (1m), Baker 0–1, Bradley 0–1, Cassidy 0–1, Doherty 0–1, Murray 0–1	Report	Turbitt 1–4 (1m,1f), R O'Neill 1–1, McQuillan 1–0, Conaty 0–2, Kelly 0–2, Crealey 0-1m, Forker 0–1, Grimley 0–1, Grugan 0–1, McCambridge 0–1, McPartlan 0–1, Nugent 0–1, O O'Neill 0–1	Stadium: Celtic Park; Attendance: ~10,000; Referee: David Coldrick (Meath)

==== Round 3 ====
15 June 2024 Round 3	Derry	2–07 – 0–09	Westmeath	Newry
19:00	McCluskey 1–0, Bradley 1–0, Glass 0–2 (1'45), McGuigan 0-2f, Mulholland 0–2, Murray 0–1	Report	O'Toole 0–3, Connellan 0–1, Dolan 0–1, Forde 0–1, Gonoud 0–1, J Smith 0–1, S Smith 0–1,	Stadium: Páirc Esler; Referee: Paul Faloon (Down)

16 June 2024 Round 3	Armagh	1–12 – 0–15	Galway	Sligo
13:45	Kelly 1–1, Turbitt 0–4 (1f), R O'Neill 0–3, Murnin 0–2, Campbell 0–1, Crealey 0–1	Report	Walsh 0–5 (3f), Finnerty 0–3 (2f), Conroy 0–2, Maher 0–1, McDaid 0–1, McHugh 0–1, Silke 0–1, Tierney 0–1	Stadium: Markievicz Park; Attendance: 8,870; Referee: Sean Hurson (Tyrone)

=== Group 2 ===
Pos	Team	Pld	W	D	L	PF	PA	PD	Pts	Qualification
1	Dublin	3	2	1	0	74	43	+31	5	Advance to quarter-final
2	Mayo	3	2	1	0	57	46	+11	5	Advance to preliminary quarter-final
3	Roscommon	3	1	0	2	60	68	−8	2	Advance to preliminary quarter-final
4	Cavan	3	0	0	3	47	81	−34	0	

Source: GAA

==== Round 1 ====
18 May 2024 Round 1	Mayo	0–20 – 1–08	Cavan	Castlebar
17:00	O'Donoghue 0–7 (4f), O'Connor 0–4, Ruane 0–3, McHale 0–2, Carney 0–1, Coen 0–1, Loftus 0–1, McLaughlin 0–1	Report	O Brady 0–5 (5f), Smith 1–0, Brady 0–1, O Kiernan 0–1, T Madden 0–1	Stadium: MacHale Park; Attendance: 9,197; Referee: David Coldrick (Meath)

25 May 2024 Round 1	Dublin	2–19 – 0–13	Roscommon	Dublin
17:00	O'Callaghan 1–4, Basquel 1–0, Costello 0–2 (2f), Fenton 0–2, Mannion 0–2, McGarry 0–2, Murphy 0–2, Scully 0–2, Bugler 0–1, Lahiff 0–1, Small 0–1	Report	Murtagh 0–5 (2f), Cox 0–4 (1f), Cregg 0–4 (1f)	Stadium: Croke Park; Attendance: 11,176; Referee: Derek O'Mahony (Tipperary)

==== Round 2 ====
1 June 2024 Round 2	Roscommon	1–15 – 2–14	Mayo	Roscommon
17:00	Cox 1–4 (1-0p,3f,1m), Murtagh 0-2f, D Smith 0–2, Carroll 0–1('45), Cregg 0–1, Dolan 0–1, Doyle 0–1, Harney 0–1, Lennon 0–1, Smith 0–1	Report	O'Donaghue 1–4 (1-0p,2f), McHugh 1–0, McLaughlin 0–3, Flynn 0–2, McHale 0–2, Conroy 0–1, O'Connor 0–1, Ruane 0–1	Stadium: Dr Hyde Park; Attendance: 8,597; Referee: Barry Cassidy (Derry)

1 June 2024 Round 2	Cavan	0–13 – 5–17	Dublin	Cavan
19:00	O Brady 0–8 (5f), Madden 0–2, L Brady 0–1('45),Kiernan 0–1, J Smith 0–1	Report	Costello 2–5 (1-0p,2f,1'45), Small 1–2, Bugler 1–1, Basquel 0–3, Fenton 0–3, McGinnis 1–0, Mannion 0-2f, Scully 0–1	Stadium: Breffni Park; Attendance: 9,028; Referee: Paddy Neilan (Roscommon)

==== Round 3 ====
15 June 2024 Round 3	Cavan	1–20 – 3–20	Roscommon	Longford
17:00	Smith 0–5, O'Reilly 0–4, Brady 0-3f, McVeety 1–0, Lovett 0–2 (1m), Kiernan 0–1, Madden 0–1, Madden 0–1, O'Neill 0–1, O'Rourke 0–1 (1'45), Smith 0–1	Report	Murtagh 1–6 (2f), Cox 0–4 (1f, 1m), Cregg 0–4 (1m), Smith 1–1, Stack 1–0, Cunnane 0–1, Harney 0–1, Glennon 0–1, Lennon 0–1, D Smith 0–1	Stadium: Pearse Park; Referee: David Gough (Meath)

16 June 2024 Round 3	Dublin	0–17 – 0–17	Mayo	Roscommon
15:45	Costello 0–7 (3f), Basquel 0–2, Bugler 0–1, Kilkenny 0–1, Mannion 0–1, McCaffrey 0–1, Murchan 0–1, O'Callaghan 0–1, Scully 0–1, Small 0–1	Report	O'Donoghue 0–7 (5f), Conroy 0–3, Ruane 0–2, Coen 0–1, Flynn 0–1, Loftus 0–1, O'Shea 0-1f, Reape 0–1 (1'45)	Stadium: Dr Hyde Park; Attendance: 16,870; Referee: Martin McNally (Monaghan)

=== Group 3 ===
Pos	Team	Pld	W	D	L	PF	PA	PD	Pts	Qualification
1	Donegal	3	2	0	1	66	37	+29	4	Advance to quarter-final
2	Tyrone	3	2	0	1	59	48	+11	4	Advance to preliminary quarter-final
3	Cork	3	2	0	1	51	51	0	4	Advance to preliminary quarter-final
4	Clare	3	0	0	3	29	69	−40	0	

Source: GAA

==== Round 1 ====
18 May 2024 Round 1	Clare	1–11 – 1–13	Cork	Ennis
18:00	McMahon 0–5 (5f), Griffin 1–0, Downes 0–2 (1f, 1'45), Walsh 0–2, Coughlan 0–1, Stack 0–1	Report	Hurley 0–3 (1f), Powter 1–0, Cronin 0–2 (1f), Sherlock 0–2 (1f), Walsh 0–2, Corbett 0–1, Jones 0–1, O'Callaghan 0–1, Walsh 0–1	Stadium: Cusack Park; Attendance: 3,262; Referee: Sean Lonergan (Tipperary)

25 May 2024 Round 1	Donegal	0–21 – 0–14	Tyrone	Ballybofey
19:15	Gallen 0–7 (5f), Mogan 0–3, McBrearty 0–2 (1f), McGee 0–2, Thompson 0–2 (1m), O Doherty 0–1, Gallagher 0–1, Langan 0–1, McHugh 0–1, S O'Donnell 0–1	Report	McCurry 0–4 (1f,1m), Canavan 0–3 (3f), McGeary 0–3, Devlin 0–1, Donnelly 0–1, Morgan 0-1f, O'Donnell 0–1	Stadium: MacCumhaill Park; Attendance: 16,607; Referee: Joe McQuillan, (Cavan)

==== Round 2 ====
1 June 2024 Round 2	Cork	3–09 – 0–16	Donegal	Cork
14:30	Hurley 0–3 (2f), Maguire 1–0, Powter 1–0, Taylor 1–0, Jones 0–2, O'Callaghan 0–2, Sherlock 0–1, Walsh 0–1	Report	McBrearty 0–7 (3f), Gallen 0–3 (2f), Moore 0–2, A Doherty 0–1, McHugh 0–1, McGonagle 0–1, N O'Donnell 0–1	Stadium: Pairc Ui Rinn; Attendance: 7,251; Referee: Brendan Griffin (Kerry)

2 June 2024 Round 2	Tyrone	3–15 – 0–10	Clare	Omagh
13:30	Devlin 2–2, Canavan 1–4 (2f,1m), Donnelly 0–4, Canavan 0–2, Daly 0–1, Kennedy 0–1, Kilpatrick 0–1	Report	McMahon 0–5 (3f), Rouine 0–2, Griffin 0–1, Lanigan 0–1, McInerney 0–1 ('45)	Stadium: Healy Park; Attendance: ~3,000; Referee: Jerome Henry (Mayo)

==== Round 3 ====
15 June 2024 Round 3	Clare	0–05 – 2–23	Donegal	Castlebar
15:00	McMahon 0–4 (3f), O'Donnell 0–1	Report	Gallen 1–4 (2'45), McHugh 1–4, McBrearty 0–5 (1f), C O'Donnell 0–2, Thompson 0–2, Curran 0–1, Langan 0–1, Mogan 0–1, Moore 0–1, O Baoill 0–1, S O'Donnell 0–1	Stadium: MacHale Park; Referee: Derek O'Mahoney (Tipperary)

15 June 2024 Round 3	Cork	0–17 – 1–18	Tyrone	Tullamore
15:00	Sherlock 0–8 (6f), Cronin 0–4 (2f), Jones 0–3, O'Driscoll 0–2	Report	Canavan 0–5 (1f), Cullen 1–0, McCurry 0–3 (1f), Morgan 0–3 (1f, 1'45), Canavan 0–2, Devlin 0–1, Kilpatrick 0–1, McKernan 0–1, O'Donnell 0–1, O'Neill 0–1	Stadium: O'Connor Park; Attendance: 16,212; Referee: Paddy Neilan (Roscommon)

=== Group 4 ===
Pos	Team	Pld	W	D	L	PF	PA	PD	Pts	Qualification
1	Kerry	3	3	0	0	75	36	+39	6	Advance to quarter-final
2	Louth	3	1	1	1	48	52	−4	3	Advance to preliminary quarter-final
3	Monaghan	3	1	1	1	50	57	−7	3	Advance to preliminary quarter-final
4	Meath	3	0	0	3	35	63	−28	0	

Source: GAA

==== Round 1 ====
18 May 2024 Round 1	Kerry	0–24 – 1–11	Monaghan	Killarney
15:00	Clifford 0–5 (3f), Geaney 0–5, O'Shea 0–4 (3f), O'Sullivan 0–3, Brosnan 0–2, P Clifford 0–2, Murphy 0–2, Moynihan 0–1	Report	Mohan 1-01 (1 '45), Bannigan 0–2, Beggan 0–1 (1f), O'Hanlon 0–1, O'Toole 0–1, McCarthy 0–1, McManus 0–1 (1f), Ward 0–1, Wilson 0–1 (1 '45), Woods 0–1 (1 '45)	Stadium: Fitzgerald Stadium; Attendance: 8,092; Referee: Sean Hurson (Tyrone)

25 May 2024 Round 1	Louth	3–10 – 0–09	Meath	Inniskeen
17:30	Mulroy 1–6 (6f), Lennon 2–1, Downey 0–1, Duffy 0–1, Keenan 0–1	Report	Frayne 0–3 (2f), Caulfield 0–1, Coffey 0–1, Costello 0–1, Hickey 0–1, Jones 0–1, O'Sullivan 0–1 (1m)	Stadium: Grattan Park; Referee: Paul Faloon (Down)

==== Round 2 ====
2 June 2024 Round 2	Monaghan	2–10 – 2–10	Louth	Clones
15:30	Bannigan 1–1, McCarthy 1–0, McManus 0-2f, Beggan 0-1f, Duffy 0-1m, McCarron 0-1f, McNulty 0–1, Mohan 0–1, O'Toole 0–1, Wilson 0–1	Report	Mulroy 0–7 (6f,1'45), Lennon 1–0, Grimes 1–0, Burns 0–2, Downey 0–1	Stadium: St Tiernach's Park; Attendance: 11,329; Referee: Fergal Kelly (Longford)

2 June 2024 Round 2	Meath	0–09 – 2–18	Kerry	Navan
14:00	Frayne 0–4 (2f), Costello 0–2 (1f), Caulfield 0–1, Coffey 0–1, O'Connor 0–1	Report	Clifford 2–2 (1f), O Beaglaoich 0–3, O'Shea 0–3 (1'45,1m), Brosnan 0–2, O'Sullivan 0–2, Clifford 0–1, Geaney 0–1, Moynihan 0–1, O'Connor 0–1, O'Connor 0–1, Spillane 0-1m	Stadium: Páirc Tailteann; Attendance: 8,224; Referee: Liam Devenney (Mayo)

==== Round 3 ====
16 June 2024 Round 3	Monaghan	1–17 – 1–14	Meath	Cavan
15:00	B McBennett 1–2, McCarron 0-4f, Bannigan 0–3 (2f), McCarthy 0–2, O'Hanlon 0–2, Irwin 0–1, Lavelle 0–1, McManus 0-1f, Woods 0–1	Report	Costello 0–4 (2f), Frayne 0–4 (2f), Hickey 1–0, Conlon 0–2, Jones 0–2, Hogan 0–1 (1'45), O'Sullivan 0–1	Stadium: Breffni Park; Referee: Joe McQuillan (Cavan)

16 June 2024 Round 3	Kerry	2–21 – 1–10	Louth	Portlaoise
15:00	Clifford 0–7 (5f), Clifford 1–2, O'Connor 1–1, Ó Beaglaoich 0–3, O'Connor 0–2, O'Shea 0–2 (1f), Brosnan 0–1, Moynihan 0–1, Murphy 0–1, O'Sullivan 0–1	Report	McKenny 1–0, Mulroy 0–3 (2f), Grimes 0–2, Byrne 0–1, Duffy 0–1, Keenan 0–1, Lennon 0–1, Mathews 0–1	Stadium: O'Moore Park; Referee: Conor Lane (Cork)

== Knockout stage ==
=== Bracket ===
Teams in bold advanced to the next round. The provincial champions are marked by an asterisk.

Preliminary quarter-finals
Tyrone	0-12
**Roscommon**	**0-14**
Mayo	1-12 (3)
**Derry** (pens.)	**0-15 (4)**
**Louth**	**1-09**
Cork	1-08
**Galway***	**0-14**
Monaghan	0-11

Quarter-finals
**Armagh**	**2-12**
Roscommon	0-12
**Kerry***	**0-15**
Derry	0-10
**Donegal***	**1-23**
Louth	0-18
Dublin*	0-16
**Galway***	**0-17**

Semi-finals
**Armagh** (a.e.t.)	**1-18**
Kerry*	1-16
Donegal*	0-15
**Galway***	**1-14**

Final
**Armagh**	**1-11**
Galway*	0-13

=== Knockout draws ===
==== Seeded in quarter-finals ====
- Armagh
- Dublin
- Donegal
- Kerry

==== Unseeded in quarter-finals ====
- Derry
- Galway
- Louth
- Roscommon

==== Seeded in preliminary quarter-finals ====
- Galway
- Louth
- Mayo
- Tyrone

==== Unseeded in preliminary quarter-finals ====
- Cork
- Derry
- Monaghan
- Roscommon

=== Preliminary quarter-finals ===
22 June 2024 Preliminary quarter-final	**Galway**	**0–14 – 0–11**	**Monaghan**	Salthill
16:00	Finnerty 0–5 (3f), Conroy 0–3, Tierney 0-2f, Comer 0–1, Maher 0–1, Ó'Conghaile 0–1, Walsh 0-1f	Report	McCarron 0–3 (2f), Bannigan 0–2 (1f), McManus 0-2f, O'Hanlon 0–2, McCarthy 0–1, Mohan 0–1	Stadium: Pearse Stadium; Attendance: 6,768; Referee: Sean Lonergan (Tipperary)

22 June 2024 Preliminary quarter-final	**Tyrone**	**0–12 – 0–14**	**Roscommon**	Omagh
17:00	McCurry 0–5 (4f), Canavan 0–3 (1f), McElholm 0–1, McKernan 0–1, O'Donnell 0–1, O'Neill 0-1m,	Report	Murtagh 0–4, Smith 0–4, Cox 0–3 (1f), Cregg 0–3	Stadium: Healy Park; Attendance: ~6,000; Referee: David Coldrick (Meath)

22 June 2024 Preliminary quarter-final	**Mayo**	**1–12 – 0–15** (a.e.t.) (**3–4** p)	**Derry**	Castlebar
18:30	O'Donaghue 1–4 (1-0p, 3f), Conroy 0–2, Flynn 0–2, Callinan 0–1, Loftus 0–1, O'Shea 0–1, Towey 0–1	Report	Murray 0–5 (1m), McGuigan 0–4 (2f), Doherty 0–2, Rogers 0–2, McKaigue 0–1, McKinless 0–1,	Stadium: MacHale Park; Attendance: 13,955; Referee: Brendan Cawley (Kildare)
	**Penalties**
	C O'Connor; P Towey; D O'Connor; R O'Donoghue; C Loftus		S McGuigan; C Glass; E Doherty; C McFaul; C Doherty

23 June 2024 Preliminary quarter-final	**Louth**	**1–09 – 1–08**	**Cork**	Inniskeen
15:00	Mulroy 0-4f, McKenny 1–0, Burns 0–2, Lennon 0–2, Matthews 0–1	Report	O'Callaghan 0–3, O'Mahony 1–0, Jones 0–2, Hurley 0–1, Maguire 0–1, O'Driscoll 0–1	Stadium: Grattan Park; Referee: Noel Mooney (Cavan)

=== Quarter-finals ===
29 June 2024 Quarter-final	**Armagh**	**2–12 – 0–12**	**Roscommon**	Dublin
16:00	McCambridge 1–2 (1m), Turbitt 1–2 (1f), Conaty 0–4, Campbell 0–2, Forker 0–1, Grimley 0–1	Report	Cox 0–5 (4f), Ruane 0–2, Higgins 0–1, McCormack 0–1, McDermott 0–1, Murtagh 0–1, Stack 0–1	Stadium: Croke Park; Attendance: 49,896; Referee: Martin McNally (Monaghan); Man of the Match: Barry McCambridge (Armagh)

29 June 2024 Quarter-final	**Dublin**	**0–16 – 0–17**	**Galway**	Dublin
18:15	Costello 0–4 (2f, 1'45), O'Callaghan 0–4 (2m, 1f), Bugler 0–2, Kilkenny 0–2, Fenton 0–1, Mannion 0–1, McGarry 0–1, Small 0-1m	Report	Walsh 0–7 (4f), McDaid 0–3, Conroy 0–1, Culhane 0–1, Darcy 0–1, Heaney 0–1, Maher 0–1, McHugh 0–1, Tierney 0-1m	Stadium: Croke Park; Attendance: 49,896; Referee: Sean Hurson (Tyrone); Man of the Match: Cillian McDaid (Galway)

30 June 2024 Quarter-final	**Donegal**	**1–23 – 0–18**	**Louth**	Dublin
13:15	Mogan 0–5, Gallen 0–4 (1f), Gallagher 1–0, Langan 0–3, McHugh 0–2, Moore 0–2, C O'Donnell 0–2, Thompson 0–2, Brennan 0–1, A Doherty 0–1, McBrearty 0–1,	Report	Mulroy 0–6 (4f), Durnin 0–4, Burns 0–2, Byrne 0–2, Early 0–1, L Jackson 0–1, T Jackson 0–1, Lennon 0–1	Stadium: Croke Park; Attendance: 47,406; Referee: Joe McQuillan (Cavan); Man of the Match: Peadar Mogan (Donegal)

30 June 2024 Quarter-final	**Kerry**	**0–15 – 0–10**	**Derry**	Dublin
15:15	Clifford 0–3 (1f, 1m), O'Shea 0–3 (2f), Brosnan 0–2, P Geaney 0–1, D Geaney 0–1, Ó Beaglaoich 0–1, D O'Connor 0–1, J O'Connor 0–1, Spillane 0–1, White 0–1	Report	McGuigan 0–5 (2f), Rodgers 0–2, Cassidy 0–1, Glass 0–1, Lynch 0–1	Stadium: Croke Park; Attendance: 47,406; Referee: David Coldrick (Meath); Man of the Match: Brian Ó Beaglaoich (Kerry)

=== Semi-finals ===
13 July 2024 Semi-final	**Armagh**	**1–18 – 1–16** (a.e.t.)	**Kerry**	Dublin
17:30	Turbitt 0–5 (3f), McCambridge 1–0, R O'Neill 0–3, Campbell 0–2, Forker 0–2, Grimley 0–2, J Burns 0–1, Grugan 0-1f, McGrane 0–1, McQuillan 0–1	Report	Clifford 0–4 (3f), O'Shea 0–4 (1f,1'45), Murphy 1–0, Clifford 0–3, Brosnan 0–1, Burke 0–1, D Geaney 0–1, Moynihan 0–1, O'Connor 0–1	Stadium: Croke Park; Attendance: 55,548; Referee: David Gough (Meath); Man of the Match: Rian O'Neill (Armagh)

14 July 2024 Semi-final	**Donegal**	**0–15 – 1–14**	**Galway**	Dublin
16:00	Langan 0–4, Gallen 0–3, McBrearty 0–3 (1f), S O'Donnell 0–2, Thompson 0–2 (1m), McGonagle 0–1	Report	Conroy 1–1, Finnerty 0–4 (2f), Walsh 0–3 (2f), McHugh 0–2, Silke 0–2, Maher 0–1, McDaid 0–1	Stadium: Croke Park; Attendance: 67,002; Referee: Brendan Cawley (Kildare); Man of the Match: Dylan McHugh (Galway)

=== Final ===
28 July 2024 Final	**Armagh**	**1–11 (14)–(13) 0–13**	**Galway**	Dublin
15:30	Conaty 0–3, McKay 1–0, Crealey 0–2, Forker 0–1, Grimley 0–1, Kelly 0–1, McCambridge 0–1, O. O'Neill 0–1, R. O'Neill 0–1	Report	Conroy 0–3, Darcy 0–3, McDaid 0–2, Walsh 0–2 (1f), Finnerty 0-1f, Maher 0–1, Silke 0–1	Stadium: Croke Park; Attendance: 82,300; Referee: Sean Hurson (Tyrone); Man of the Match: Oisín Conaty (Armagh)

== Stadia and locations ==
County	Location	Province	Stadium	Capacity
Antrim	Belfast	Ulster	Corrigan Park	3,700
Armagh	Armagh	Ulster	Athletic Grounds	18,500
Carlow	Carlow	Leinster	Dr Cullen Park	21,000
Cavan	Cavan	Ulster	Breffni Park	25,030
Clare	Ennis	Munster	Cusack Park	19,000
Cork	Cork	Munster	Páirc Uí Chaoimh	45,000
Derry	Derry	Ulster	Celtic Park	18,500
Donegal	Ballybofey	Ulster	MacCumhaill Park	18,000
Down	Newry	Ulster	Páirc Esler	20,000
Dublin	Dublin	Leinster	Croke Park	82,300
Fermanagh	Enniskillen	Ulster	Brewster Park	20,000
Galway	Galway	Connacht	Pearse Stadium	26,197
Kerry	Killarney	Munster	Fitzgerald Stadium	38,000
Kildare (Note: Kildare's usual home venue, St. Conleth's Park in Newbridge, is under redevelopment.)	Newbridge	Leinster	Manguard Park	1,200
Laois	Portlaoise	Leinster	O'Moore Park	22,000
Leitrim	Carrick-on-Shannon	Connacht	Páirc Seán Mac Diarmada	9,331
Limerick	Limerick	Munster	Gaelic Grounds	44,023
London	South Ruislip	Britain	McGovern Park	3,000
Longford	Longford	Leinster	Pearse Park	10,000
Louth	Drogheda	Leinster	Drogheda Park	3,500
Mayo	Castlebar	Connacht	MacHale Park	25,369
Meath	Navan	Leinster	Páirc Tailteann	11,000
Monaghan	Clones	Ulster	St Tiernach's Park	29,000
New York	Bronx	North America	Gaelic Park	2,000
Offaly	Tullamore	Leinster	O'Connor Park	18,000
Roscommon	Roscommon	Connacht	Dr Hyde Park	18,890
Sligo	Sligo	Connacht	Markievicz Park	18,558
Tipperary	Thurles	Munster	Semple Stadium	45,690
Tyrone	Omagh	Ulster	Healy Park	17,636
Waterford	Waterford	Munster	Fraher Field	15,000
Westmeath	Mullingar	Leinster	Cusack Park	11,000
Wexford	Wexford	Leinster	Chadwicks Wexford Park	18,000
Wicklow	Aughrim	Leinster	Aughrim County Ground	7,000

== Statistics ==
=== Top scorers ===
==== Overall ====
Rank	Player	County	Tally	Total	Matches	Average
1	Ryan O'Donoghue	Mayo	3–48	57	7	8
2	Sam Mulroy	Louth	3–43	52	8	6.5
3	Cormac Costello	Dublin	2–25	36	7	5
4	Robert Finnerty	Galway	1–29	32	8	4
4	Oisín Gallen	Donegal	2–26	32	6	5
6	Darragh Canavan	Tyrone	1–26	29	6	5
6	Con O'Callaghan	Dublin	4–16	28	7	4
8	David Clifford	Kerry	2–22	28	5	6
9	Diarmuid Murtagh	Roscommon	1–22	26	5	5
10	Emmet McMahon	Clare	1–22	25	5	5

==== In a single game ====
Rank	Player	County	Tally	Total	Opposition
1	Ryan O'Donoghue	Mayo	1–13	16	New York
2	Paddy Lynch	Cavan	1-09	12	Monaghan
3	Cormac Costello	Dublin	2-05	11	Cavan
4	Sean Nolan	Wexford	1-07	10	Carlow
4	Sam Mulroy	Louth	2-04	10	Wexford
6	Tom O'Connell	Waterford	2-03	09	Tipperary
6	Seán O'Shea	Kerry	0-09	09	Clare
6	James Conlon	Meath	1-06	09	Longford
6	Paul Mannion	Dublin	1-06	09	Meath
6	Diarmuid Murtagh	Roscommon	1-06	09	Cavan
6	Sam Mulroy	Louth	1-06	09	Meath

=== Scoring events ===
Does not include after extra-time.

- Widest winning margin: 27 points
  - London 0-09 – 5–21 Galway (Connacht quarter-final)
- Most goals in a match: 6
  - Longford 3–12 – 3–19 Meath (Leinster preliminary round)
- Most points in a match: 41
  - Donegal 1–23 – 0–18 Louth (All-Ireland quarter-final)
- Most goals by one team in a match: 5
  - London 0-09 – 5–21 Galway (Connacht quarter-final)
  - Cavan 0–13 – 5–17 Dublin (Round 2)
- Most points by one team in a match: 24
  - Kerry 0–24 – 1–11 Monaghan (Round 1)
- Highest aggregate score: 52 points
  - Cavan 1–20 – 3–20 Roscommon (Round 3)
- Lowest aggregate score: 21 points
  - Leitrim 0-06 – 0–15 Sligo (Connacht quarter-final)
  - Waterford 2-07 – 1-05 Tipperary (Munster quarter-final)

=== Miscellaneous ===
- Sligo and Leitrim met in the Connacht Championship for the first time since 2011.
- Waterford beat Tipperary for the first time since 1988 and had their first win in the Munster SFC since 2010.
- Dublin and Offaly met in the Leinster championship for the first time since 2007.
- Clare appeared in consecutive Munster finals for the first time since 1936 and 1937.
- Ennis hosted the Munster SFC final for the first time since 1919.
- Louth appeared in consecutive Leinster finals for the first time since 1957 and 1958.
- Louth defeated Meath in the championship for the first time since 1975.
- Galway won the Connacht title third year running for the first time since 1982–84.
- Dublin won a 14th Leinster title in a row.
- Inniskeen hosted its first ever championship game.
- Louth reached the All-Ireland quarter-finals for the first time. (They had reached the semi-finals and final on previous occasions, but had not reached the quarter-finals since that stage was introduced in 2001.)
- Armagh reached the All-Ireland semi-finals for the first time since 2005, reached the All-Ireland final for the first time since 2003 and won the All-Ireland for the first time since 2002.
- Armagh wore black against Kerry in the All-Ireland semi-final.
- Dublin failed to reach the All-Ireland semi-finals for the first time since 2009.
- Donegal reached the All-Ireland semi-finals for the first time since 2014.
- Derry played, and lost to, all four teams that reached the All-Ireland semi finals.

== See also ==
- 2024 Connacht Senior Football Championship
- 2024 Leinster Senior Football Championship
- 2024 Munster Senior Football Championship
- 2024 Ulster Senior Football Championship
- 2024 Tailteann Cup (Tier 2)
- 2024 All-Ireland Senior Hurling Championship
- 2024 All-Ireland Senior Ladies' Football Championship
