= West Kerry GAA =

Gaelic games club in County Kerry, Ireland

WestKerry
- Ciarraí Thiar
- County: Kerry
- Colours: Red & White
- Grounds: Paddy Kennedy Park Annascaul

Playing kits
Standard colours

Senior Club Championships
	All Ireland	Munster champions	Kerry champions
Football:	0	0	3

West Kerry is a Divisional Gaelic football team in Kerry. In 1924 the county convention of Kerry County Board agreed to setting up divisional boards to promote Gaelic football and hurling in Kerry.

The Premier competition in West Kerry is the West Kerry Championship and the West Kerry League.

== Member clubs ==
All Gaelic Football clubs.

- An Ghaeltacht
- Annascaul
- Castlegregory
- Dingle
- Lios Póil

== Achievements ==
- Kerry Senior Football Championship (3) 1984, 1985, 1990
- Kerry Under-21 Football Championship (5) 1977, 1989, 1994, 1996, 2009
- Kerry Minor Football Championship 1959, 1990, 1993, 2007, 2008, 2011

== Notable players ==
- Páidí Ó Sé
- Dara Ó Cinnéide
- Tomás Ó Flatharta
- Rónán Ó Flatharta
- Mícheál Ó Sé
- Marc Ó Sé
- Darragh Ó Sé
- Tomás Ó Sé
- Páidí Ó Sé
- Aodán Mac Gearailt
- Tommy Doyle
- Paddy Kennedy
- Bingo O'Driscoll
- Sean Murphy
- Fintan Ashe
- Paddy Bawn Brosnan
- Bill Dillon
- David Geaney
- Michael Geaney
- Paul Geaney
- Seán Geaney
- Tommy Griffin
- Diarmuid Murphy
- Vincent O'Connor
- Pat "Aeroplane" O'Shea
- Tom Moriarty
- Sean O'Mahony
- Bill Casey

== Divisional competitions ==
- West Kerry Senior Football Championship
