= Geaney =

Geaney is an Irish surname, the Anglicized form of the Gaelic Mag Éanna, which is derived from the personal name Éanna.

== Kerry Gaelic footballers ==
- David Geaney (Castleisland Gaelic footballer)
- David Geaney (Kerry Gaelic footballer, born 1985)
- Mary Geaney
- Michael Geaney
- Paul Geaney
- Seán Geaney
