= Vincent Knightley =

Irish Gaelic footballer

Personal information
- Born: Annascaul, County Kerry

Sport
- Sport: Gaelic football
- Position: Half back
Club
- Years: Club
- 1980s-1990s: Annascaul
Club titles
- Kerry titles: 1
Inter-county
- Years: County
- 1991: Kerry
Inter-county titles
- All-Irelands: 0
- All Stars: 0

Vincent Knightley is a former Gaelic footballer from Annascaul, County Kerry, Ireland. He played with Kerry during the late 80's and 90's.

== Club ==
He played his club football with Annascaul with whom he won County Intermediate Championships in 1987 and 1992 and helped the club to the Kerry Senior Football Championship final in 1993 when Annascaul lost out to Laune Rangers, he did however win a County Under 21 Championship in 1989 and Senior Championship in 1990 with West Kerry

== Minor ==
He joined the Kerry minor team in 1988. Wins over Waterford, Limerick and Cork seen him win a Munster title. Kerry later faced Dublin in the All-Ireland final, a 2-05 to 0-05 win seen Knightly win an All-Ireland medal.

== Under 21 ==
He later joined the Under 21 team where he had more success. He first joined the team in 1990 as the side's captain, where he played in all of Kerry's games as a win over Cork in the Munster final. In the final Knightly and co faced Ulster champions Tyrone. Goals proved to be the difference as The Kingdom hit the Ulster men for 5, in a 5-12 to 2-11 win. It gave Knightly an All-Ireland Under 21 title as well as being the team's captain.

He was underage again in 1991 and had more success. A win over Cork seen Knightly pick up a second Munster Under-21 Football Championship. A win over Meath in the All-Ireland semi-final seen Knightly and co back in the All-Ireland final. It was a repeat of the 1990 final as Kerry faced Tyrone. While goals won it for Kerry the year before it was the other way around this time as Tyrone hit Kerry for 4 in a 4-16 to 1-05 loss for Knightly side.

== Junior ==
He joined the county Junior side in 1990 lining out in the Munster Junior Football Championship semi-final win over Waterford, but played no part in the final.

He was again part of the side in 1991 where he was made captain of the team. He led his side to a Munster Junior Football Championship final win over Waterford on a 1-12 to 3-04 scoreline. Kerry later qualified for the All-Ireland Junior Football Championship final where they faced London. Knightley scored a point in the game as his side won out on a 2-14 to 0-05 win. Knightly was an All-Ireland winning captain for the second year in a row after the win.

== Senior ==
Despite his success at minor, Under 21 and Junior level he only had a limited senior career. Knightley played three games during the 1990–91 National Football League against Roscommon, Donegal and Cork.
