= Gene Farrell =

Irish Gaelic footballer

Personal information
- Born: 1972 (age 53–54) Camp, County Kerry

Sport
- Sport: Gaelic football
- Position: Forward
Club
- Years: Club
- 1988-2018: Annascaul
Inter-county
Years	County	Apps (scores)
1995-1996	Kerry	6 (0-05)
Inter-county titles
- Munster titles: 1
- All-Irelands: 0
- All Stars: 0

Gene Farrell is a Gaelic footballer from Camp, County Kerry in Ireland. He played with the Kerry intercounty team during the 1990s winning Munster Championships at Minor (1990), Under 21 (1992) and Senior level (1996).

== Club ==
He played his club football with Annascaul and West Kerry. He helped them to the 1993 County Final where they lost out to Laune Rangers. He won two Kerry Intermediate Football Championship, one Kerry Senior Club Football Championship, one Kerry County League Div 1, one Kerry Junior Football Championship, one Munster Intermediate Club Football Championship as well as West Kerry Senior Football Championship and West Kerry titles with Annascaul.

With the divisional West Kerry team, he won Kerry Minor Football Championship and Kerry Under 21 Football Championship titles.

In association football (soccer), Farrell played with Camp United in the Kerry District League.

== Third level ==
Farrell won Sigerson Cups with University College Galway in 1992, and with Tralee RTC/Tralee IT in 1997 and 1998.

== Intercounty ==
Minor

Farrell lined out with the Kerry minor team in 1990. Appearing as a sub in wins over Tipperary and Clare on route to picking up a Munster Minor Football Championship medal. He was used as a sub as Kerry drew with Galway in the All-Ireland semi-final. In the replay, he scored 1-02 in a 2-07 to 0-09 win. In the final, Kerry faced Meath, and Farrell scored two points in a 2-11 to 2-09 loss.

Under 21

He joined the Kerry Under 21 team in 1991. He missed the Munster championship winning campaign, instead joining for the All-Ireland semi-final. He scored a goal in a 2-07 to 1-06 win over Meath. Kerry faced Tyrone in the All-Ireland final, losing 4-16 to 1-05.

He was again part of the team in 1992. He scored 0-02 in a quarter-final against Limerick and 1-03 in the semi-final against Waterford. He missed out on the final win over Cork.

Junior

Farrell had a brief time with the Kerry Junior team. His only appearance in a Munster championship semi-final loss to Cork.

Senior

He joined the Kerry senior team during the 1994–95 National Football League. He played in all nine of the sides games as they lost out to Tyrone in the quarter-final. He made his championship debut as a sub against Tipperary in the Munster semi-final where he scored a point in a 7-13 to 1-12 win. He started in the Munster final against Cork. Despite scoring two points he ended up on the losing side on a 0-15 to 1-09 scoreline.

He played in six of Kerry's 1995–96 National Football League games. Wins over Tipperary and Waterford saw Farrell qualify for the Munster final once more when they again faced Cork. Despite not scoring himself a 0-14 to 0-11 win saw him pick up a Munster Senior Football Championship medal. In the All-Ireland semi-final, Kerry faced Mayo. Mayo won by 2-13 to 1-10.

In the 1996–97 National Football League, Farrell played in every game up to the quarter-final. In the quarter-final win over Down, he picked up an injury that ruled him out of the season and missed out as Kerry went on to win that years All-Ireland.

He made a surprise return for the 2000-01 National Football League, playing in losses to Louth and Tyrone.
