= 1941 Kerry Senior Football Championship =

Gaelic football competition

- Teams: 8
- Champions: Dingle (3rd title); Tom O'Connor (captain)
- Runners-up: Boherbee John Mitchels

The 1941 Kerry Senior Football Championship was the 41st staging of the Kerry Senior Football Championship since its establishment by the Kerry County Board in 1889.

Dingle entered the championship as the defending champions.

The final was played on 12 October 1941 at Austin Stack Park in Tralee, between Dingle and Boherbee John Mitchels, in what was their second meeting in the final and the first meeting in four years. Dingle won the match by 3–06 to 2–00 to claim their third championship title overall and a second title in succession.

== Results ==
=== Final ===
12 October 1941 Final	Dingle	3-06 - 2-00	Boherbee John Mitchels	Austin Stack Park
