= Sean O'Mahony =

Sean O'Mahony may refer to:

- Seán O'Mahony (1872–1934), Irish politician
- Sean O'Mahony (Gaelic footballer), Irish sportsperson
- Sean O'Mahony (journalist) (1932–2020), British music writer
