= Pat O'Shea =

Pat O'Shea may refer to:

- Pat O'Shea (Gaelic footballer, born 1888) (1888–1980), won All-Ireland Senior Football Championship titles with Kerry in 1913 and 1914
- Pat O'Shea (Gaelic footballer, born 1966), managed Kerry to the 2007 All-Ireland Senior Football Championship title
- Pat O'Shea (author) (1931–2007), Irish-born author
