= Sean O'Mahony (Gaelic footballer) =

Gaelic football player

Personal information
- Born: 1976 (age 49–50) Castlegregory, County Kerry

Sport
- Sport: Gaelic football
- Position: Full/half back
Club
- Years: Club
- 1990s-2010s: Castlegregory
Club titles
- Kerry titles: 0
Inter-county
- Years: County
- 1997: Kerry
Inter-county titles
- Munster titles: 4
- All-Irelands: 2

Sean O'Mahony is an Irish sportsperson. He plays Gaelic football with his local club Castlegregory and was a member of the Kerry inter-county teams during the 90's. He was part of the Kerry Minor, Under 21, Junior and Senior teams.

== Club ==
With Castlegregory O'Mahoney won County and Munster Junior titles and late won an All Ireland Junior Championship in 2010.

He also played with West Kerry with whom he won a Kerry Minor Football Championship in 1993 and Kerry Under-21 Football Championships in 1994 and 1996. He also played on the team who lost the 1996 Kerry Senior Football Championship.

== Underage ==
O'Mahoney first played with the Kerry minor team in 1993. He was Left corner back as Kerry lost to Cork in the first round.

He was still underage in 1994 and had more success. Wins over Limerick, Cork and Clare saw him win a Munster medal. Kerry later qualified for the All-Ireland after overcoming Armagh in the semi-final. In the final O'Mahoney and Kerry played Galway. Kerry took the title after a 0–16 to 1–07 win to give O'Mahoney an All-Ireland minor medal.

In 1997 O'Mahoney joined the Kerry Under 21 team and was made captain. Wins over Limerick and Clare saw Kerry book a place in the Munster final. In the final Kerry faced Cork. The sides ended level and a replay was needed. Kerry made no mistake second time out winning 0–12 to 1-07 and gave O'Mahoney a Munster title as captain. O'Mahoney and Kerry's season came to an end after losing out to Meath in a point in the All-Ireland semi-final.

== Junior ==
In 1997 O'Mahony joined the Kerry Junior team. Wins over Waterford and Clare saw O'Mahoney pick up a Munster title. In the All-Ireland semi-final Kerry overcame Meath. In the All-Ireland final Kerry faced Mayo. In the end Mayo took the title.

In 2000 O'Mahony again lined out with the Junior side. Wins over Cork and Clare saw O'Mahony win his second Munster title. Kerry overcame Wexford in the All-Ireland to book a place in the All-Ireland final. Im O'Mahony's second All-Ireland final at the Junior grade Kerry faced Roscommon. Like in 1997 the title went West as O'Mahony was an All-Ireland runner up for a second time.

He lined out with the team again in 2001, however Kerry had a surprise loss to Tipperary in the Munster first round.

== Senior ==
O'Mahony played only one game with Kerry when he played in a 1996/97 National League game against Tyrone.
