= Castlegregory GAA =

Gaelic sports club in County Kerry, Ireland

Castlegregory
- Cumann Lúthchleas Gael Caisléan Ghriaire
- Founded: 1889
- County: Kerry
- Nickname: Castle
- Colours: Green and Gold
- Grounds: Pairc an Caislean, Castlegregory
- Coordinates: 52°15′32.59″N 10°00′55.14″W

Playing kits
Standard colours

Castlegregory are a Gaelic Athletic Association club based in the parish of Castlegregory in County Kerry, Ireland. This is a Gaelic football only club, with no hurling played. The club is a member of the West Kerry division of Kerry GAA. They play their home games at Pairc An Caislean located just outside the parish's main village of the same name.

The club fields teams at all age groups from U10 through to senior and has had regular representation on county teams from U16 to U21.

== History ==
Football was played in Castlegregory long before the GAA was founded in 1884. The game of Caid was played in the parish of Castlegregory long before, and even after, the foundation of the GAA in Thurles in 1884. Caid itself seems to have been a combination of football and cross country running - the contestants being teams from neighbouring parishes.

One such game took place near Stradbally in 1866, between teams representing Castle and Cloghane, with both sides claiming victory. A replay took place 2 years later with Cloghane winning. A local balladeer recalled the game in a song called "The Kickers of Lios na Caol Bhuidhe" which contains the line: "..they'd kick all before them from here to Tralee". Another line recounts events when the game became a little too robust: "The referee, with his whistle, was up on top a tree".

The first official GAA club of the parish was known as Castlegregory Allen - in memory of William Allen, one of the Manchester Martyrs. The club took part in the first Kerry County Championship played in 1889 in which they met a team called Ó Breannan. After two draws, the second replay was played in Castle on 10 April, but the game was abandoned after O'Breannan refused to continue when Castle scored a disputed goal. However, both teams subsequently retired to a local hostelry and had a night of singing and dancing.

The first recorded meeting of the club took place in October 1889 and Thomas Moore was elected president. John Foran and Thomas McCarthy were elected captain and vice captain respectively. Tom O'Flaherty from Fahamore subsequently became Honorary Secretary of the Kerry County Board and not long after Castle became a fully affiliated club.

The club took part in the first Senior Kerry County Championship played in 1889 reaching the semi-final eventually losing to the Killarney Crokes (Dr. Crokes).

== Competitions ==
Kerry GAA competitions are divided into two distinct branches - divisional and county. In divisional competitions, teams face off against their neighbours from within their own geographical area. In Castlegregory's case, this means that they play against other West Kerry clubs such as Dingle, An Gaeltacht, Lispole and fierce rivals Annascaul.

County competitions involve matches against opposition from throughout County Kerry and are independent of divisional championships.

Castlegregory also send players to form part of the West Kerry divisional team which competes in the Kerry County Championships at Minor, U21 and Senior levels.

Castlegregory's underage teams take part in similar county Gaelic football and divisional competitions.

== Parish leagues ==
As a large parish, early Castlegregory teams suffered from logistical difficulties when it came to the organisation of training sessions. To overcome this, a parish league was formed which pitted the best 15 from each or the parish's larger townlands against each other. This included teams from Cloghane, Stradbally, Aughacasla, Camp, Maharees and Castlegregory.

As the local population declined, many townlands had trouble finding 15 players, to the point where the parish league was disbanded.

In its place an annual once off game is held between sides representing the east of the parish and the west of the parish. These clashes take place every December, normally around St Stephen's Day.

== Notable players ==
Castlegregory has produced a number of players who have played for Kerry. These include Jack Dowling (All Ireland senior medal 1959), Pat O'Shea and Tom Moriarty.

Castlegregory players have also played at university level in the Sigerson Cup, including Micheál O' Sé with UCC (2001), JB Spillane with UCC (2011) and Seán Mahoney with IT Tralee (1998).

== Kerry Senior football team ==
Castlegregory club members, who have played for Kerry senior teams, include:

- Pat "Aeroplane" O'Shea (1910 - 1914)
- James Kennedy (1950 - 1950) - 1 Appearances
- Michael Moriarty (1953 - 1953) - 3 Appearances
- Tom Moriarty (1951 - 1954)
- Jack Dowling (1956 - 1961) - 33 Appearances
- Pat Dowling (1960 - 1960) - 4 Appearances
- MJ O'Shea (1965 - 1968) - 4 Appearances
- Tom Kelliher (1967 - 1967) - 1 Appearances
- Mossie O'Connor (1969 - 1969) - 1 Appearances
- John Healy (1985 - 1985) - 4 Appearances
- Sean O'Mahony (1997 - 1997) - 21 Appearances
- Alan Fitzgerald (2014 - 2016) - 18 Appearances
- Ciara Butler (2018 – present)

== Roll of honour ==
- West Kerry Senior Football Championship: (3) 1966, 1973, 1977
- Kerry Intermediate Football Championship: (2) 1942, 1975
- Kerry Junior Football Championship: (3) 1974, 2009, 2021
- Munster Junior Club Football Championship: (1) 2009
- All-Ireland Junior Club Football Championship: (1) 2010
