= Barry McCambridge =

Armagh Gaelic footballer

Personal information
- Nickname: Baz
- Born: 1998 (age 27–28) Lurgan, Northern Ireland
- Occupation: Teacher
- Height: 6 ft 0 in (183 cm)

Sport
- Sport: Gaelic Football
- Position: Right Half Back
Club
- Years: Club
- 2015–: Clann Éireann
Club titles
- Armagh titles: 1
Inter-county
- Years: County
- Armagh county football team

Barry McCambridge (born 1998) is a Gaelic footballer who plays for the Clann Éireann club and at senior level for the Armagh county team. McCambridge scored a goal against Kerry in the 2024 All-Ireland Senior Football Championship Semi-Final, to send his team through to a first final for 21 years. Before that he scored a goal in the Quarter-Final against Roscommon. McCambridge is a versatile player, whether across the full-back line or at wing-back, where his scoring and "robust tackling" came to the fore during the 2024 run. He also played handball at a juvenile level.

The Sunday Game gave McCambridge its Footballer of the Year award for 2024. He won an All Star at the end of the 2024 season.

== Honours ==
Armagh

- All-Ireland Senior Football Championship (1): 2024

Individual

- All Star (1): 2024
