= 1940 Kerry Senior Football Championship =

Gaelic football competition

- Teams: 8
- Champions: Dingle (2nd title); Bill Dillon (captain)
- Runners-up: Strand Street O'Rahilly's

The 1940 Kerry Senior Football Championship was the 40th staging of the Kerry Senior Football Championship since its establishment by the Kerry County Board in 1889.

Strand Street O'Rahilly's entered the championship as the defending champions.

The final was played on 13 October 1940 at Austin Stack Park in Tralee, between Dingle and Strand Street O'Rahilly's, in what was their second consecutive meeting in the final. Dingle won the match by 2–06 to 1–07 to claim their second championship title overall and a first title in two years.

== Results ==
=== Final ===
13 October 1940 Final	Dingle	2-06 - 1-07	Strand Street O'Rahilly's	Austin Stack Park
