= Tom O'Sullivan (Dingle Gaelic footballer) =

Irish Gaelic footballer

Personal information
- Native name: Tom Ó Súilleabháin (Irish)
- Born: 1 November 1996 (age 30) Tralee, County Kerry, Ireland
- Height: 5 ft 11 in (180 cm)

Sport
- Sport: Gaelic football
- Position: Left corner-back
Club
- Years: Club
- Dingle
Club titles
- Kerry titles: 1
- Munster titles: 1
- All-Ireland Titles: 1
Inter-county
- Years: County
- 2016–present: Kerry
Inter-county titles
- Munster titles: 7
- All-Irelands: 2
- NFL: 4
- All Stars: 3

Tom O'Sullivan (born 1 November 1996) is an Irish Gaelic footballer. At club level he plays with Dingle, and at inter-county level with the Kerry senior football team.

== Career ==
O'Sullivan first played Gaelic football to a high standard as a schoolboy at Pobalscoil Chorca Dhuibhne. He was part of the school team that won back-to-back Hogan Cup titles in 2014 and 2015, while he was also part of four Corn Uí Mhuirí-winning teams. At club level, O'Sullivan plays with Dingle. After a Kerry MFC success in 2014, he has since gone on to win numerous West Kerry SFC titles, as well as a Kerry Club FC title in 2015.

O'Sullivan first appeared on the inter-county scene with Kerry as a member of the minor team that beat Donegal in the 2014 All-Ireland minor final. A two-year association with the under-21 team yielded a Munster U21FC medal in 2017.

Following his first season with the under-21 team, O'Sullivan was drafted onto the senior team in 2016. He won the first of seven Munster SFC medals in eight seasons that year. O'Sullivan was at left corner-back when Kerry were beaten by Dublin in the 2019 All-Ireland final replay, but ended the season with his first All Star. He won three consecutive National League medals from 2020 to 2022, having earlier won his first title in 2017. A second All Star followed in 2021, before O'Sullivan won an All-Ireland SFC medal after a defeat of Galway in the 2022 final.

== Honours ==
Pobalscoil Chorca Dhuibhne

- Hogan Cup: 2014, 2015
- Corn Uí Mhuirí: 2012, 2013, 2014, 2015

Dingle

- All Ireland Senior Club Football Championship: 2026
- Munster Senior Club Football Championship:2025
- Kerry Senior Football Championship:2025
- AIB GAA Club Team of the Year: 2026
- AIB GAA Club Player of the Year: 2026
- Kerry Club Football Championship: 2015, 2023
- West Kerry Senior Football Championship: 2014, 2016, 2018, 2019, 2020, 2021, 2022
- Kerry Minor Football Championship: 2014

Kerry

- All-Ireland Senior Football Championship: 2022
- Munster Senior Football Championship: 2016, 2017, 2018, 2019, 2021, 2022, 2023
- National Football League: 2017, 2020, 2021, 2022
- Munster Under-21 Football Championship: 2017
- All-Ireland Minor Football Championship: 2014
- Munster Minor Football Championship: 2013, 2014
