= Annascaul GAA =

Games club in Ireland

Annascaul
- Cumann Lúthchleas Gael Abhainn an Scáil
- Founded: 1920s
- County: Kerry
- Colours: Blue & White
- Grounds: Paddy Kennedy Memorial Park
- Coordinates: 52°09′11″N 10°02′51″W

Playing kits
Standard colours

Annascaul GAA Club (Irish: Cumann Lúthchleas Gael Abhainn an Scáil ) is a Gaelic Athletic Association club that plays Gaelic football and is based in Annascaul, County Kerry, Ireland. They play in Division 1 of the County Football League and in the Kerry Senior Football Championship. Annascaul is formed by three communities – Annascaul, Inch and Camp. Camp has the proud distinction of having the most All-Ireland medals per head of population of any village in Ireland. There are reports of Hurling being played in the area during the early part of the 20th century.

== History ==
In the mid-1950s, the parishes of Annascaul and Camp joined forces to establish the Annacaul GAA Club. The club won the West Kerry Championship in 1957.

It has had much success over the years; the most recent coming between 1981 and 1993 when the club won three Kerry Intermediate Football Championship, one Kerry County Football League - Division 1, four West Kerry Senior Football Championship, and one County Club Championship. The club played in one County Championship final, one Kerry Intermediate Football Championship, and two West Kerry Senior Football Championship finals.

Since 2000, the club has won the Kerry Junior Football Championship, Kerry Intermediate Football Championship, Munster Intermediate Club Football Championship, County League Division 2, a West Kerry Senior Football Championship and two West Kerry Leagues. They have also played in two other Kerry Intermediate Football Championship finals, one West Kerry Senior Football Championship Final, two West Kerry League Finals, two West Kerry Minor Championship Finals, and one Munster Junior Club Football Championship Final.

In 1993, the club played in the Kerry Senior Football Championship for the first time and made it to the final, where shorn of many of their star players due to injury, lost out to Laune Rangers. There were some notable wins along the way, including a first round win over then holders Mid Kerry and over locals West Kerry in the semi-final.

The club was the first in the county to have a weekly lottery.

The club's home ground is named after Paddy Kennedy who played for Kerry in the 1930s and 1940s. Regarded by many as one of the all-time greats of Kerry football, he was captain of the 1946 All-Ireland winning team. The pitch was opened in 1984; the first game played there was between Kerry and Dublin. Since then, there have been many West Kerry League championship games and finals played there by all age groups as well as many County League championships. In 2003, the Munster Ladies Minor Football Championship final between Kerry and Cork was played there. In 2008, a round of the Ladies National League was played between Kerry and Mayo.

In 2011, clubs in West Kerry set up a scholarship to honour the memory of Annascaul footballer Brendan "Bawnie" O'Driscoll who collapsed during a match and died.

== Roll of honour ==
- Kerry Senior Football Championship (Runners Up): 1993
- County Club Champions: Winners (1) 1989 (Runners up) 1991
- Kerry Intermediate Football Championship: Winners (4) 1982, 1987, 1992, 2007
- Munster Intermediate Club Football Championship: Winners (1) 2007
- Kerry Junior Football Championship: Winners (3) 1979, 2003, 2020
- Munster Junior Club Football Championship Runners-up 2004
- Kerry Novice Football Championship Winners (1) 1976
- Kerry County Football League - Division 1: (1) 1991
- County League Division 2: Winners (2) 1987, 2003
- County League Division 3: (2) Winners 1976, 1984
- County League Division 4: (1) Winners 2025
- West Kerry Senior Football Championship: Winners (6) 1957, 1988, 1989, 1990, 1992, 2009

== Notable players ==
- Tommy Doyle, seven-time All-Ireland Senior Football Championship winner and three-time All-Star; 1986 All-Ireland Senior Football Championship winning captain
- Gene Farrell: Minor, U21, Senior
- Paddy Kennedy Five time All-Ireland winner. 1946 All-Ireland Senior Football Championship winning captain.
- Vincent Knightley 1990 All-Ireland Under 21 Football Championship winning captain. 1991 All-Ireland Junior Football Championship winning captain.
- Bingo O'Driscoll Intercounty player with Kerry and New york.
- Sean Murphy
