= Fintan Ashe =

Irish Gaelic football player

Personal information
- Height: 6 ft 3 in (191 cm)

Sport
- Sport: Gaelic football
- Position: Midfield
Club
- Years: Club
- 1980s-2000s: Dingle GAA
Inter-county
- Years: County
- 1990@s: Kerry
Inter-county titles
- All Stars: 7

Fintan Ashe (born 1970 in Dingle, County Kerry) is an Irish sportsperson. He played Gaelic football with his local club Dingle and was the Kerry inter-county team at all levels during the late 1980s and 1990s. He won an All-Ireland minor medal in 1988. In 1990, he was part of the All-Ireland Under 21 winning panel and the following year he won an All-Ireland Junior title.

== Club ==
Ashe played his club football with Dingle. He won four Kerry Intermediate Football Championship in1988, 1989, 1997 and 2004. He also won a number of West Kerry Senior Football Championship titles.

== Underage ==
Ashe played with the Kerry minor team in 1988. He came on as a sub in the Munster final win over Cork, but was midfield for the All-Ireland final win over Dublin where he scored a point.

He then moved to the Under 21 team. He won a Munster medal in 1990 as Kerry overcame Cork in the final. He played no part as Kerry went on to win the All-Ireland title.

He was still underage in 1991. His first game was in the Munster final, where he scored 1–01 to win his second Munster title. He later lined out in the All-Ireland final loss to Tyrone.

== Junior ==
He played with the Kerry junior team for three seasons. His first two seasons in 1989 and 1990 seen no successes, with two losses in Munster finals to Cork being his lot.

He was still part of the team in 1991. He lined out in a third Munster final, this time facing Waterford. He scored a point as Kerry won the title. He later lined out in the All-Ireland final win over London, where he scored two points.

== Senior ==
Ashe never played with Kerry in the championship during his playing days, but played a number of National League games in the early 1990s. He was a member of the extended panel of Kerry's 1997 All-Ireland Senior Football Championship winning campaign.
