= Vincent O'Connor =

Irish Gaelic footballer (born 1957)

Personal information
- Native name: Uinseann Ó Conchubhair (Irish)
- Nickname: Shin
- Born: 1957 (age 68–69) Dingle, County Kerry, Ireland

Sport
- Sport: Gaelic football
- Position: Left wing-forward
Club
- Years: Club
- 1970s-1990s: Dingle
Club titles
- Kerry titles: 2
Inter-county*
Years	County	Apps (scores)
1977-1984	Kerry	12 (1-05)
Inter-county titles
- Munster titles: 3
- All-Irelands: 1
- NFL: 2
- All Stars: 0
- *Inter County team apps and scores correct as of 20:18, 23 September 2011.

Vincent 'Shin' O'Connor (born 1957 in Killarney, County Kerry, Ireland) is an Irish former sportsperson. He played Gaelic football with his local club Dingle and was a member of the Kerry senior inter-county team from 1977 until 1984. He was a selector under Páidí Ó Sé during his time a Clare manager.

== Club ==
At club level he lined out with Dingle and West Kerry. He won back to back Kerry Senior Football Championship titles in 1984/85 with West Kerry.

With Dingle he won back to back Kerry Intermediate Football Championship titles in 1988/89.

== Minor ==
O'Connor lined out with Kerry at minor level in 1975. A semi-final win over Tipperary on a 6-23 to 0-05 scoreline and a Munster final win over Cork on a 3-07 to 1-11 scoreline seen him pick up a Munster Minor Football Championship medal.

He missed the sides semi-final win over Roscommon but was back for the final. He was at Left Corner Back in a 1-10 to 0-04 win over Tyrone to pick up an All-Ireland Minor Football Championship medal.

== Under 21 ==
O'Connor joined the Under 21 team straight out of minor.

In 1976 wins over Tipperary and Cork seen him pick up a Munster Under 21 Football Championship medal. A semi-final win over Mayo seen Kerry qualify for the All-Ireland final. He was Right Half Back during a 0-14 to 1-03 win to pick up an All-Ireland Under 21 Football Championship medal.

In 1977 wins over Clare and Cork seen him pick up his second Munster title. An All-Ireland semi-final win over Leitrim seen him qualify for another final. In the final Kerry faced Down. A 1-11 to 1-05 win seen him pick up his second All-Ireland U21 title.

In 1978 wins over Tipperary, Clare and Cork seen O'Connor pick up his third Munster title in a row. A semi-final win over Louth seen O'Connor qualified for a third All-Ireland final in a row. There was to be no three in a row as Kerry came up short on a 1-09 to 1-08 scoreline to Rocommon.

== Senior ==
O'Connor first joined the Kerry senior team during the 1976/77 National League where he played four games. He played no part in the subsequent championship.

He played three games during the 1977/78 League. He was part of the championship panel that went on to win that years All-Ireland.

He played another four games in the 1978/79 league. He made his championship debut in a game later known as the Miltown Massacre. He was midfield, and scored 1-02, as powered to a 9-21 to 1-09 win over Clare. He was again midfield for the Munster final with Cork. A 2-14 to 2-04 win seen him pick up his first Munster Senior Football Championship title. He was again at midfield, and score a point, in the All-Ireland semi-final win over Monaghan. He lost his place for the All-Ireland final with Dublin. he did however come on in a 3-13 to 1-08 win to pick up his first All-Ireland on the field.

He played in all eight of Kerry's 1979/80 National League games, including the final loss to Cork. His only championship game came in the Munster final with Cork. A 3-13 to 0-12 win seen him pick up his second Munster title.

1981/82 seen him line out in another league final against Cork. The sides finished level; however, he missed out on the replay. He made his first championship start since 1979 when he lined out against Clare in the Munster semi-final. He was back among the subs, but appeared as he picked up his third Munster title after overcoming Cork in the final after a replay.

In 1983 he lined out in yet another Munster final with Cork. But for the second year in a row Kerry were undone by a late goal. This time by Tadhg Murphy as Cork took the Munster title for the first time since 1974.

In the 1983/84 National League he lined out in seven of Kerry's games. This including the final win over Galway. Despite his role in the league win his only championship appearance was also against Galway in the All-Ireland semi-final.

His final appearance with Kerry came in the 1987 Munster final replay loss to Cork.

Despite a successful underage and National League career O'Connor could never hold down a place in the championship team. In all he made 12 Championship appearances between 1979 and 1987.
