= Rory Maguire =

Irish Gaelic footballer (born 1999)

Personal information
- Native name: Ruairí Mag Uidhir (Irish)
- Born: 1999 (age 26–27) Ballinadee, County Cork, Ireland
- Occupation: Student

Sport
- Sport: Gaelic Football
- Position: Centre-back
Club
- Years: Club
- Castlehaven
Club titles
- Cork titles: 1
- Munster titles: 1
College
- Years: College
- 2018-present: MTU Cork
College titles
- Sigerson titles: 0
Inter-county*
Years	County	Apps (scores)
2022-present	Cork	4 (0-00)
Inter-county titles
- Munster titles: 0
- All-Irelands: 0
- NFL: 0
- All Stars: 0
- *Inter County team apps and scores correct as of 22:12, 10 February 2023.

Rory Maguire (born 1999) is an Irish Gaelic footballer who plays for club side Castlehaven and at inter-county level with the Cork senior football team. He usually lines out at centre-back.

== Honours ==
Castlehaven

- Munster Senior Club Football Championship: 2023
- Cork Premier Senior Football Championship: 2023

Cork

- All-Ireland Under-20 Football Championship: 2019
- Munster Under-20 Football Championship: 2019
