= Darren McHale =

Gaelic footballer

Darren McHale is a Gaelic footballer who plays at club level for Knockmore and at senior level for the Mayo county team.
