= Michael Geaney =

Kerry Gaelic footballer

Personal information
- Native name: Mícheál Ó Géibheannaigh (Irish)
- Born: 2 October 1989 (age 37) Tralee, Ireland
- Occupation: Sports Trader
- Height: 1.81 m (5 ft 11 in)

Sport
- Sport: Gaelic football
- Position: Right half forward
Club
- Years: Club
- 2006-: Daingean Uí Chúis
Inter-county
Years	County	Apps (scores)
2012-	Kerry	6 (0-3)
Inter-county titles
- Munster titles: 2
- All-Irelands: 1
- NFL: 1
- All Stars: 0

Michael Geaney (born 2 October 1989) is an Irish Gaelic footballer who plays for Dingle and has played at senior level for the Kerry county team since 2012.

He is a cousin of Kerry footballer Paul Geaney and younger brother of former Kerry player David Geaney.
