= 1938 Kerry Senior Football Championship =

Gaelic football competition

- Dates: May - 27 November 1933
- Teams: 10
- Champions: Dingle (1st title); Jimmy McKenna (captain)
- Runners-up: North Kerry; Con Brosnan (captain)

The 1938 Kerry Senior Football Championship was the 38th staging of the Kerry Senior Football Championship since its establishment by the Kerry County Board in 1889.

Boherbee John Mitchels entered the championship as the defending champions, however, they were beaten by North Kerry in the semi-finals.

The final was played on 27 November 1938 at Austin Stack Park in Tralee, between Dingle and North Kerry, in what was their first ever meeting in the final. Dingle won the match by 3–03 to 2–05 to claim their first ever championship title.

== Results ==
=== Semi-finals ===
28 August 1938 Semi-final	North Kerry	2-06 - 1-07	Boherbee John Mitchels	Austin Stack Park

28 August 1938 Semi-final	Dingle	0-09 - 0-08	Strand Street O'Rahilly's	Austin Stack Park

=== Final ===
27 November 1938 Final	Dingle	3-03 - 2-05	North Kerry	Austin Stack Park

== Championship statistics ==
=== Miscellaneous ===
- Dingle win the title for the first time.
- North Kerry qualify or the final for the first time since 1932.
