= Dingle GAA =

Gaelic games club in County Kerry, Ireland

Dingle
- Daingean Uí Chúis
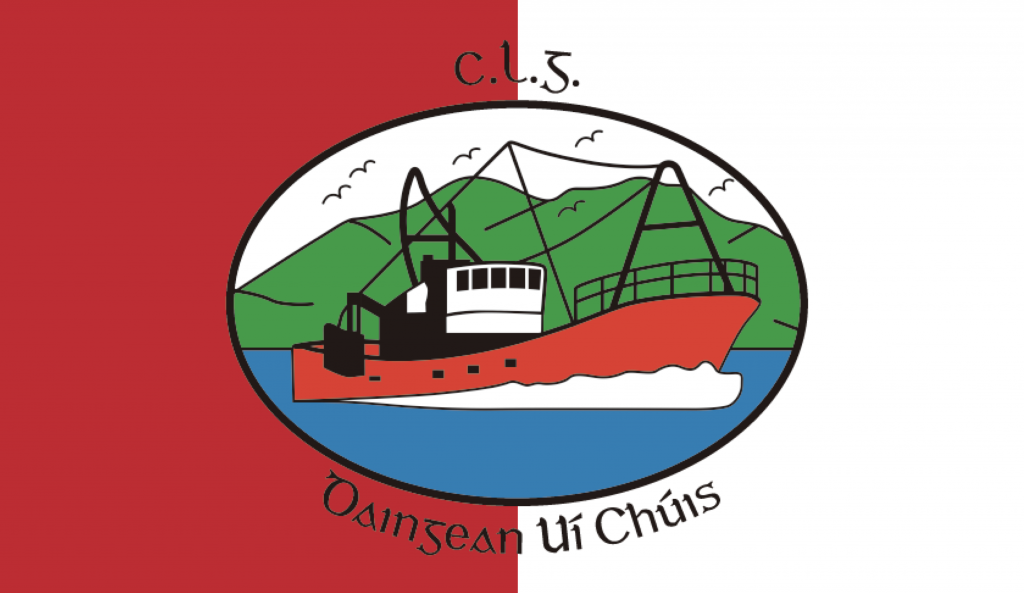
- Founded: 1891
- County: Kerry
- Colours: Red and white
- Grounds: Páirc an Ághsaigh
- Coordinates: 52°08′15″N 10°16′03″W

Playing kits
Home Kit	Change Kit

Senior Club Championships
	All Ireland	Munster champions	Kerry champions
Football:	1	1	7
Hurling:	-	-	0

CLG Daingean Uí Chúis (Dingle GAA) is a Gaelic Athletic Association (GAA) club based in the town of Dingle in County Kerry, Ireland. They compete in the Kerry Senior Football Championship and are seven time winners. As of 2025, Dingle are the Kerry Senior Football Championship title holders. Their traditional colours are red and white.

First founded in 1891 and affiliated with the Kerry County Board in the same year, the modern iteration of CLG Daingean Uí Chúis/Dingle GAA came in 1967 with the amalgamation of Na Piarsaigh and Sraid Eoin. Their away jersey reflects the combined colours of the two clubs.

== History ==
A team representing Dingle was first formed in 1891.

In 1903, they competed under the name of the 'Dingle Wreckers'. In 1905, the club was reorganised as the 'Dingle Gascons'. A local priest was one of the main contributors to the changes. In 1907, they lost the final against Tralee Mitchels.

In 1910 and 1911, two Dingle teams competed in the senior championship, the Dingle Gascons and Dingle St. Brendan's. Dingle Gascons reached the 1919 county final, falling short once again to Tralee Mitchels. This was the last great bid by them to win the county title. After that the team went into decline, severely hit by emigration.

The 1930s and 1940s, brought with it a "golden era of GAA" in Dingle. Between 1937 and 1948, Dingle competed in 9 county finals. During this period the team contained players from Lispole and the area now covered by An Ghaeltacht GAA

In 1937 and 1947, they lost finals against John Mitchels GAA Club. In 1938, Dingle defeated North Kerry to claim their first senior county championship. On 27 November 1938 in Austin Stack Park, Dingle won the match by 3–03 to 2–05. The 1940 final was won against Kerins O'Rahilly's while the 1941 final was won against John Mitchels GAA Club.

Dingle won back to back county titles, with Castleisland providing the final opposition in 1943 and 1944. The golden period for Dingle would come to an end in 1948, Tom Long captained then to a victory over Shannon Rangers.

On 23 January 1943, Dingle purchased Fort Field for the sum of £700. The club had been using the pitch since May 1907. The field was re-named Pairc an Aghasaigh in honour of Thomas Ashe of Kinard who was prominent in the Easter Rising.

In 1967, the modern version of Dingle GAA or CLG Daingean Uí Chúis was formed with the amalgamation of Na Piarsaigh and Sraid Eoin.

Dingle did not compete in another county final until 2012, which they lost to Dr Crokes 2-13 to 0-08. Dingle reached two more county finals in 2018 and 2024, also losing these finals to Dr Crokes.

A 77 year wait, for a senior Kerry football title, was ended by Dingle in 2025. On 26 August 2025 in Austin Stack Park, Paul Geaney captained Dingle in a 2-13 to 1-12 win versus Austin Stacks. While it was Dingle's seventh title, it was the first since the amalgamation of Dingle's Na Piarsaigh and Sraid Eoin clubs in the 1960s. The club went on to win the 2025 Munster Club Football Championship and 2026 All-Ireland Senior Club Football Championship.

=== Hurling ===
While predominantly known as a Gaelic football club, Dingle reached the 1940 Kerry Senior Hurling Championship final, losing to Banna GAA by 7 points in the final.

== Honours ==
- All-Ireland Senior Club Football Championship (1): 2026
- Munster Senior Club Football Championship (1): 2025
- Kerry Senior Football Championship (7): 1938, 1940, 1941, 1943, 1944, 1948, 2025
- Kerry Senior Hurling Championship (0): (runners-up in 1940)
- Kerry Club Football Championship (2): 2015, 2023
- Kerry County Football League - Division 1 (3): 1977, 2021, 2022
- Kerry Intermediate Football Championship (4): 1988, 1989, 1996, 2004
- Kerry Junior Football Championship (1): 1971
- Kerry Minor Football Championship (2): 2014, 2015
- Kerry Under-21 Football Championship (0): (runners up in 2016, 2018)
- Kerry Under-21 Club Championship (1): 2010
- West Kerry Senior Football Championship (16): 1981, 1993, 1994, 1995, 1996, 1999, 2003, 2007, 2010, 2012, 2013, 2014, 2016, 2018, 2019, 2020 2021, 2022, 2023, 2024

=== Winning Senior Kerry football finals ===
Year	Winners	Score	Runners-up	Score	Captain
1938	Dingle	3-03	North Kerry	2-05	Jimmy McKenna
1941	Dingle	2-06	Kerins O'Rahilly's	1-07	Bill Dillion
1941	Dingle	3-06	John Mitchels	2-00	Tom 'Gega' O'Connor
1943	Dingle	3-06	Castleisland Desmonds	2-02	Paddy Bawn Brosnan
1944	Dingle	1-03	Castleisland Desmonds	0-04	Tim 'Timaleen Deas' Brosnan
1948	Dingle	2-10	Shannon Rangers	0-05	Tom Long
2025	Dingle	2-13	Austin Stacks	1-12	Paul Geaney

== Notable players ==
Dingle club members, who have played for Kerry at inter-county level, include:

- Fintan Ashe, All-Ireland Minor Football Championship winner
- Paddy Bawn Brosnan, winner of 3 All-Ireland titles
- Bill Dillon, winner of 4 All-Ireland titles
- Jack Ferriter, 1994 All-Ireland Minor Football Championship winning captain
- David Geaney, Munster Senior Football Championship winner
- Michael Geaney, All-Ireland winner
- Paul Geaney, winner of 3 All-Irelands and several All Stars
- Seán Geaney, 2008 All-Ireland Under-21 Football Championship winning manager
- Tommy Griffin, winner of 5 All-Irelands
- Diarmuid Murphy, winner of 4 All-Irelands and several All Stars
- Tom 'Gega' O'Connor, winner of 5 All-Irelands
- Vincent O'Connor, All-Ireland winner
- Mark O'Connor, 2015 All-Ireland Minor Football Championship winning captain. 2022 AFL premiership winner with Geelong Football Club. O'Connor was a member of Dingle's 2025 Kerry SFC winning squad
- Tom O'Sullivan, winner of several All Stars and All-Ireland titles
