= Eoghan McLaughlin =

Gaelic footballer

Personal information
- Native name: Eoghan Mac Lochlainn (Irish)

Sport
- Sport: Gaelic Football
- Position: Left half back
Club
- Years: Club
- Westport
Inter-county
- Years: County
- 2020–: Mayo

Eoghan McLaughlin is a Gaelic footballer who plays at club level for Westport and at senior level for the Mayo county team.
