= West Kerry Senior Football Championship =

Gaelic football competition

The West Kerry Senior Football Championship is a Gaelic football competition between clubs affiliated to the West Kerry division of the Gaelic Athletic Association.

== Teams ==
As of 2026, the teams in the competition included:

Club	Location	Colours	Grade	Championship titles	Last championship title
An Ghaeltacht	Gaeltacht	White with Red sash	Senior	12	2025
Annascaul	Annascaul	Blue and white	Premier Junior	6	2009
Castlegregory	Castlegregory	Green and gold	Premier Junior	3	1977
Dingle	Dingle	Red and white	Senior	19	2023
Lispole	Lispole		Junior	10	2004

== List of finals ==
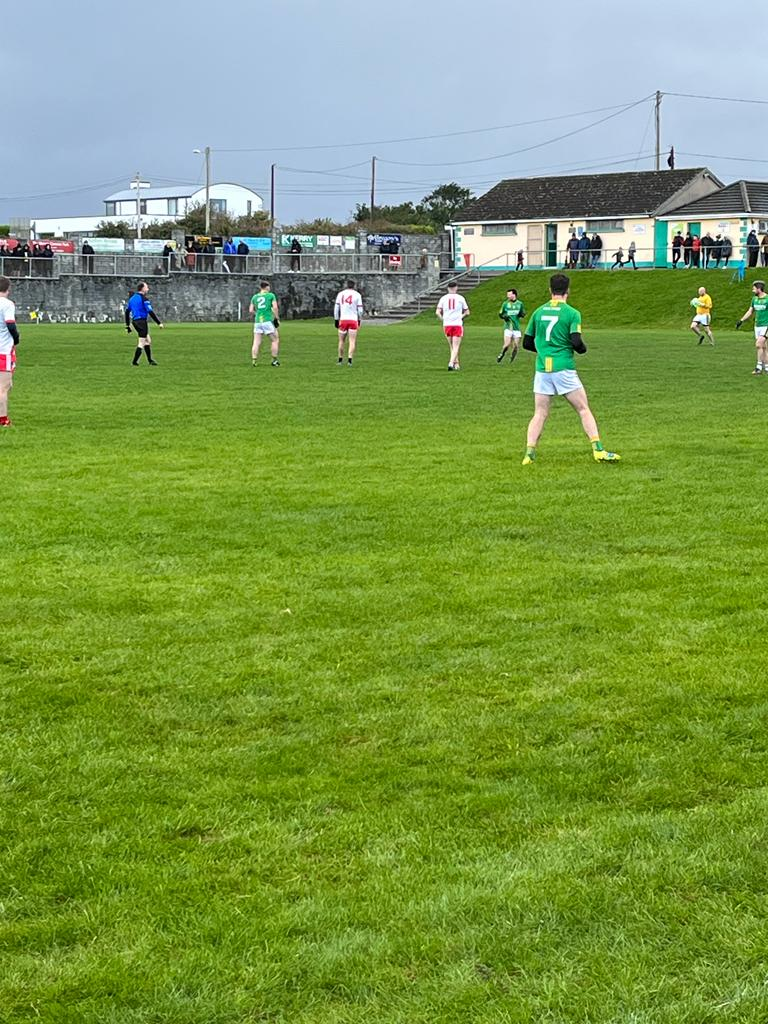
Castlegregory v An Ghaeltacht 2022

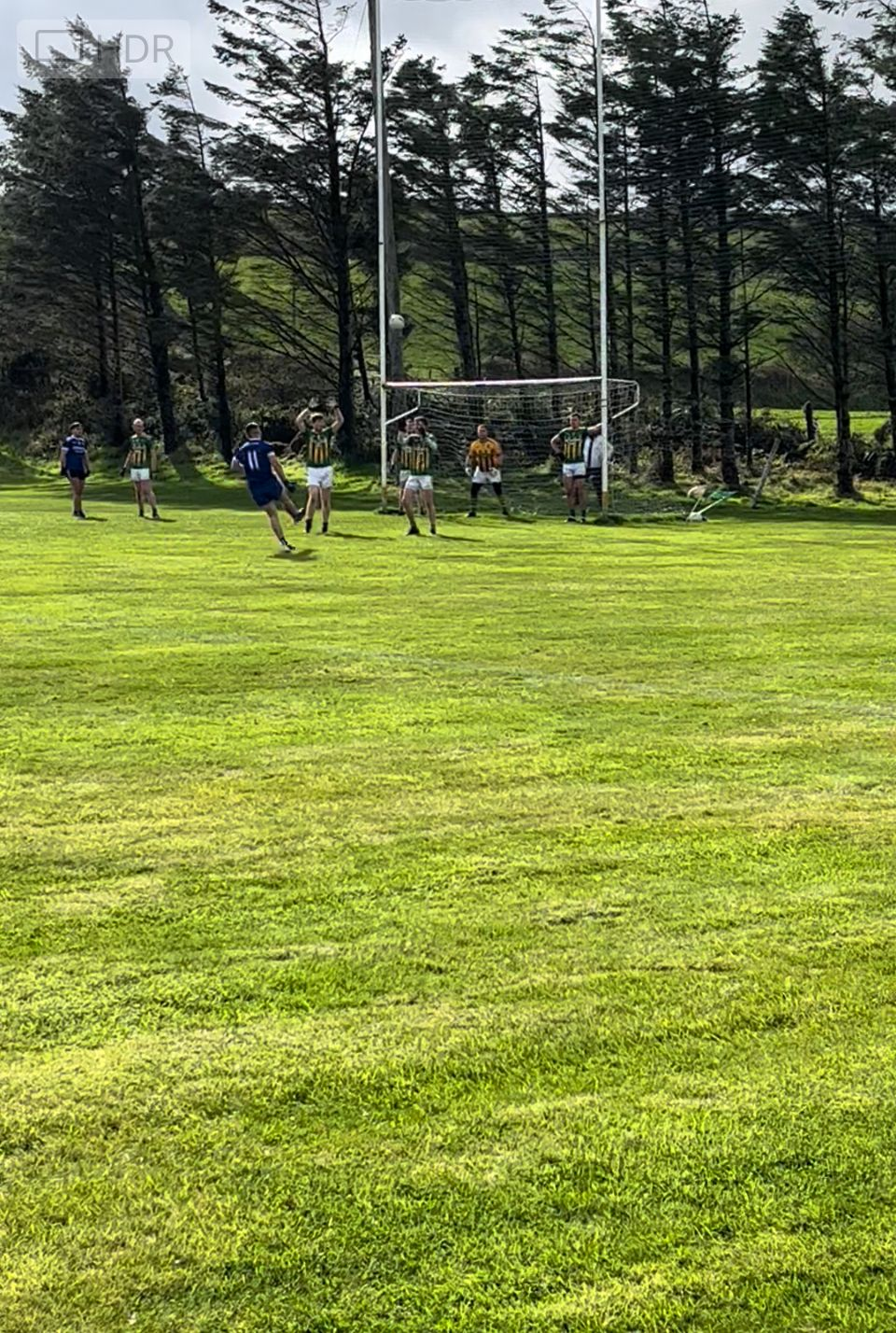
Annascaul play lispole in West Kerry Championship 2022

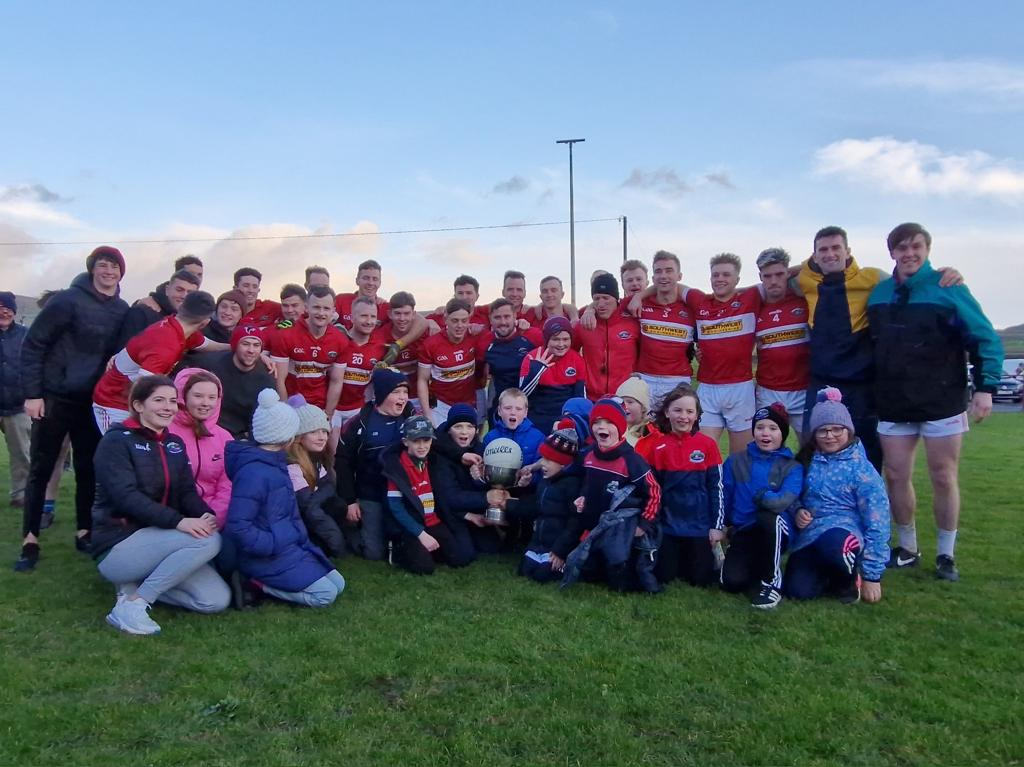
West Kerry Champions 2022

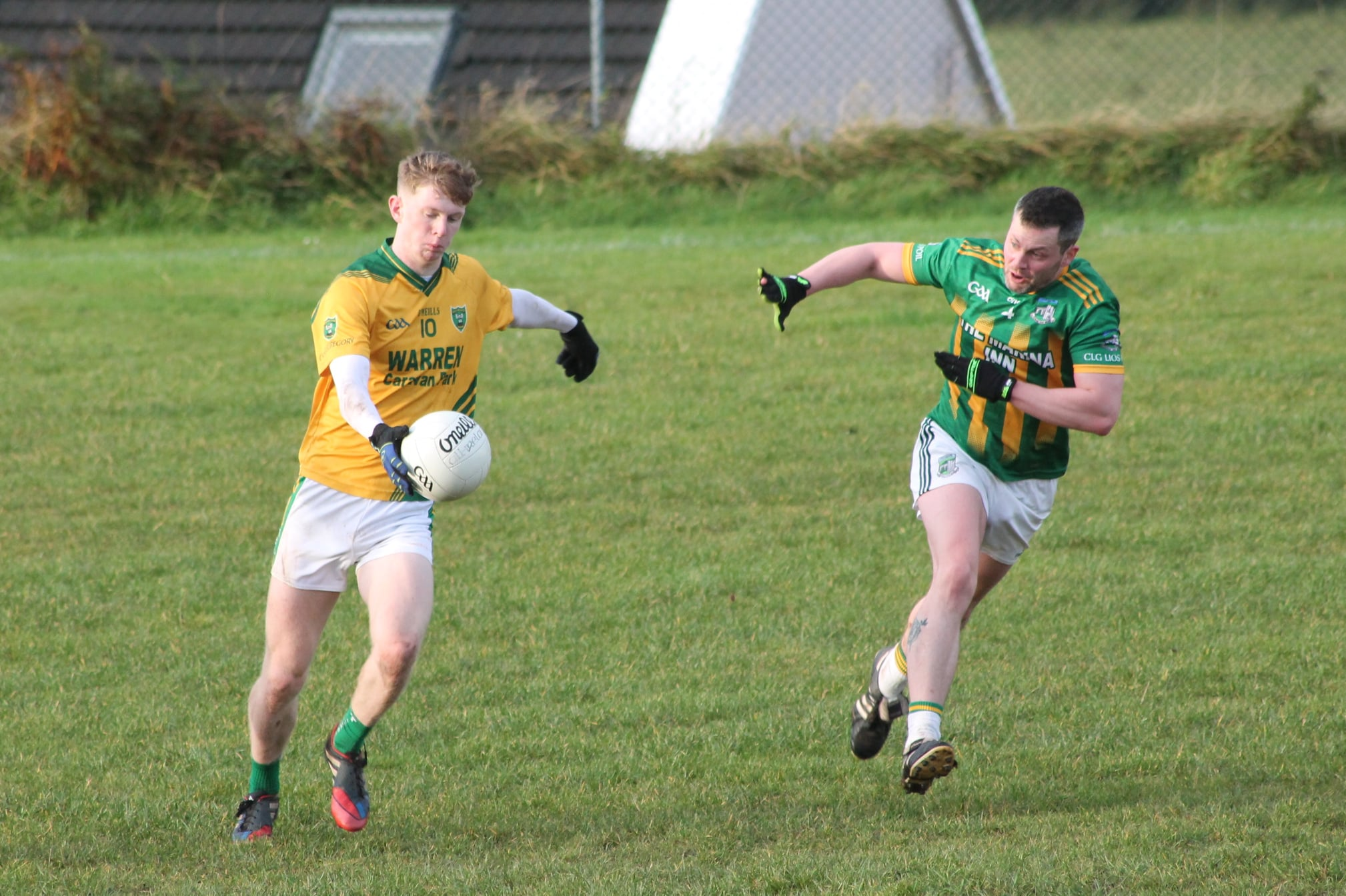
2021 West Kerry Championship Quarter-final Lios Póil v Caisléan Ghriaire

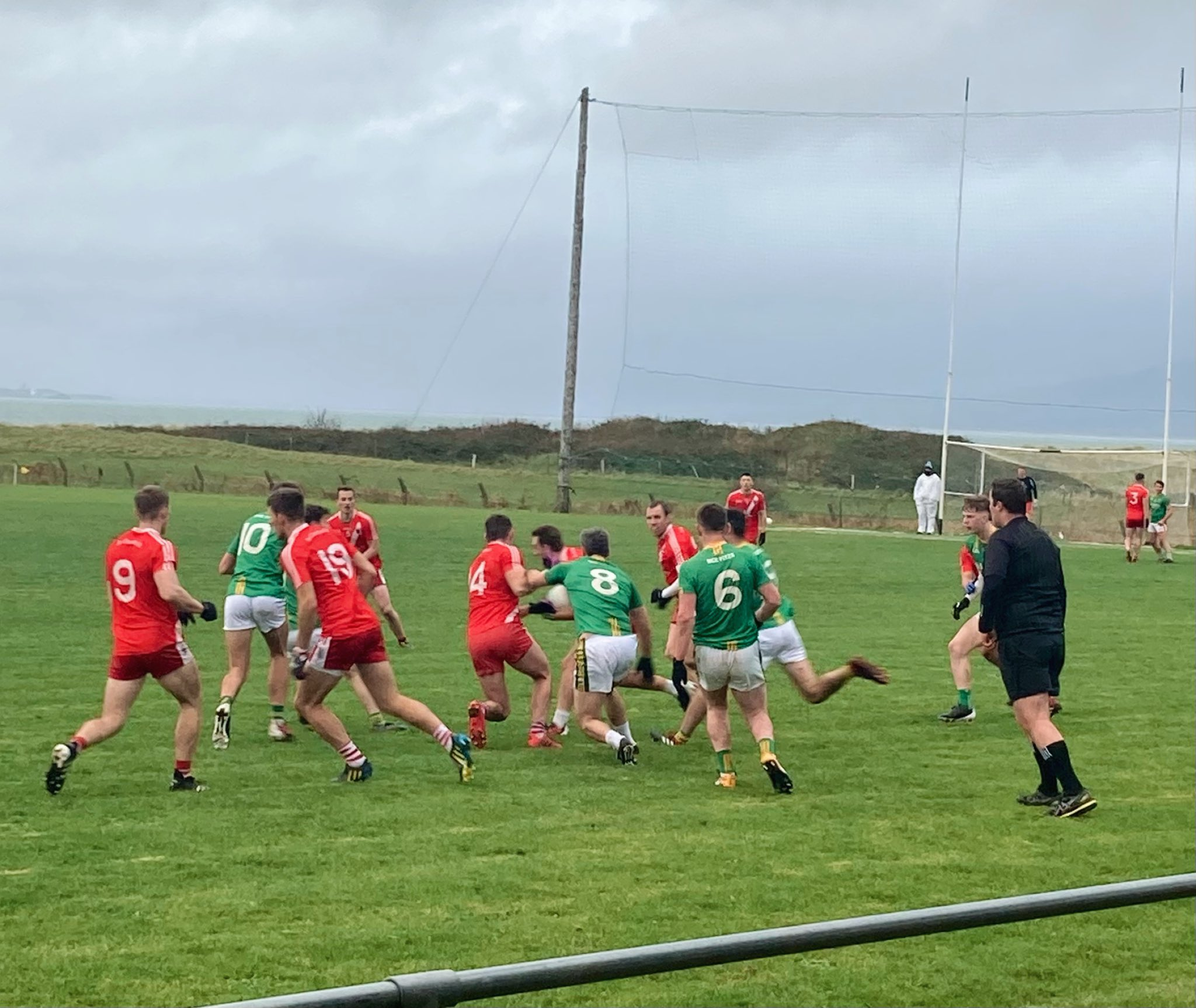
Castlegregory v An Ghaeltacht West Kerry Semi-final 2021

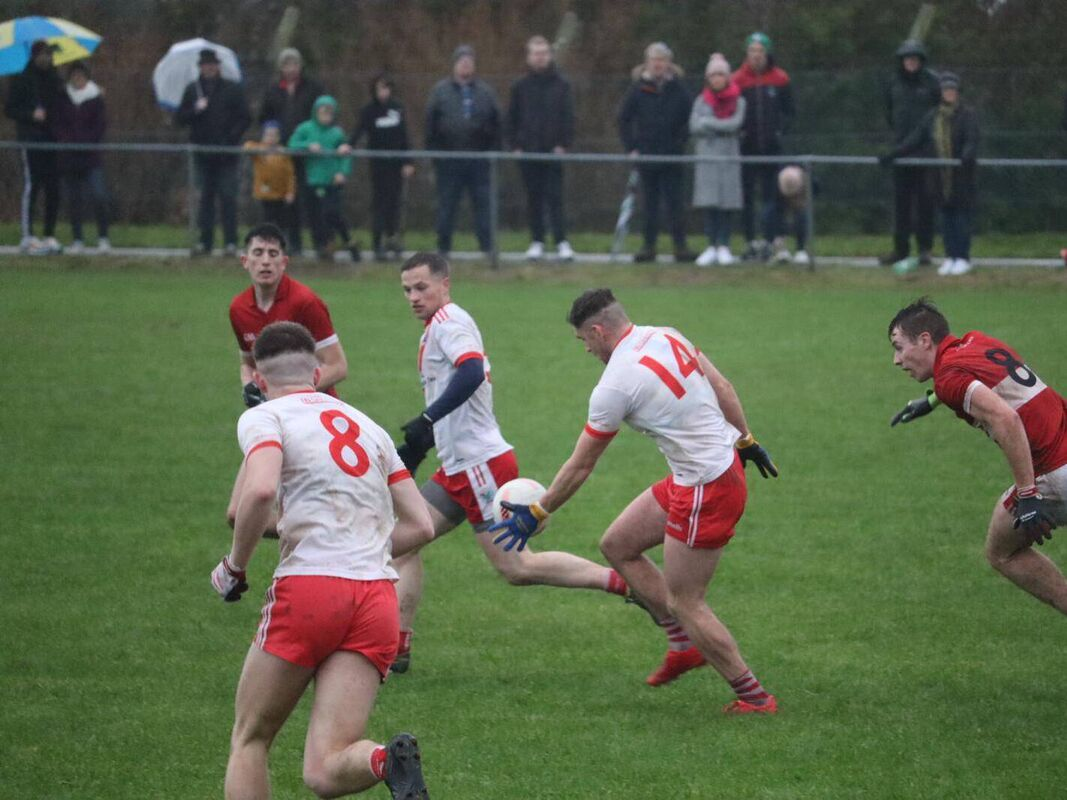
An Ghaeltacht v Dingle 2021 West Kerry Final

Year	Winner	Score	Opponent	Score
2026	Dingle	2-11	Castlegregory	0-09
2025	An Ghaeltacht	2-14	Castlegregory	1-16
2024	Dingle	1-16	Castlegregory	0-12
2023	Dingle	2-14	Annascaul	0-09
2022	Dingle	0-09	An Ghaeltacht	0-06
2021	Dingle	2-12	An Ghaeltacht	0-05
2020	Dingle	1-13	An Ghaeltacht	0-09
2019	Dingle	0-20	An Ghaeltacht	0-09
2018	Dingle	0-14	Annascaul	0-13
2017	An Ghaeltacht	2-04	Dingle	0-09
2016	Dingle	0-18	An Ghaeltacht	1-13
2015	An Ghaeltacht	0-12	Annascaul	0-09
2014	Dingle	0-15	An Ghaeltacht	0-10
2013	Dingle	3-08	An Ghaeltacht	0-11
2012	Dingle	3-19	Annascaul	0-09
2011	Not Played		Not Played	
2010	Dingle	1-06	An Ghaeltacht	1-05
2009	Annascaul	0-07	An Ghaeltacht	0-06
2008	An Ghaeltacht	0-14	Annascaul	1-10
2007	Dingle	1-11	Castlegregory	0-11
2006	An Ghaeltacht		Lispole	
2005	Not Played			
2004	Lispole		Annascaul	
2003	Dingle		Lispole	
2002	An Ghaeltacht		Dingle	
2001	An Ghaeltacht		Lispole	
2000	An Ghaeltacht		Castlegregory	
1999	Dingle		An Ghaeltacht	
1998	An Ghaeltacht		Annascaul	
1997	An Ghaeltacht		Dingle	
1996	Dingle		An Ghaeltacht	
1995	Dingle		Annascaul	
1994	Dingle		Lispole	
1993	Dingle		An Ghaeltacht	
1992	Annascaul			
1991	An Ghaeltacht		Annascaul	
1990	Annascaul			
1989	Annascaul		Dingle	
1988	Annascaul		Dingle	
1987	Lispole		Dingle	
1986	Lispole		Dingle	
1985	Lispole		Dingle	
1984	Lispole		Dingle	
1983	Lispole		An Ghaeltacht	
1982	Lispole			
1981	Dingle		Annascaul	
1980	Kerins O'Rahilly's		Dingle	
1979	Lispole		Annascaul	
1978	Lispole			
1977	Castlegregory		Annascaul	
1976	Castlegregory		Dingle	
1975	Dingle	2-08	Lispole	0-04
1974	Kerins O'Rahilly's	2-04	Dingle	0-06
1973	Castlegregory		Annascaul	
1972	Lispole			
1971				
1970	An Ghaeltacht			
1969				
1968				
1967				
1966	Castlegregory			
1965				
1964				
1963	Na Piarsaigh			
1962				
1961				
1960				
1959				
1958				
1957	Annascaul			
1956				
1955				
1954				
1953	Na Piarsaigh			
1952	Na Piarsaigh			
1951	Na Piarsaigh			
1950	Na Piarsaigh			
1949	Na Piarsaigh			

== Roll of honour ==
#	Club	Titles	Years won
1	Dingle	22	1975, 1981, 1993, 1994, 1995, 1996, 1999, 2003, 2007, 2010, 2012, 2013, 2014, 2016, 2018, 2019, 2020, 2021, 2022, 2023, 2024, 2026
2	An Ghaeltacht	12	1970, 1991, 1997, 1998, 2000, 2001, 2002, 2006, 2008, 2015, 2017, 2025
3	Lispole	10	1972, 1978, 1979, 1982, 1983, 1984, 1985, 1986, 1987, 2004
4	Na Piarsaigh	6	1949, 1950, 1951, 1952, 1953, 1963
4	Annascaul	6	1957, 1988, 1989, 1990, 1992, 2009
6	Castlegregory	4	1966, 1973, 1976, 1977
7	Kerins O'Rahilly's	2	1974, 1980

== Other competitions ==
=== West Kerry Senior Football League ===
The West Kerry Senior Football League which has been sponsored by Lee Strand since the mid 1980s is a competition that is traditionally played at the beginning of the year between the five member clubs.

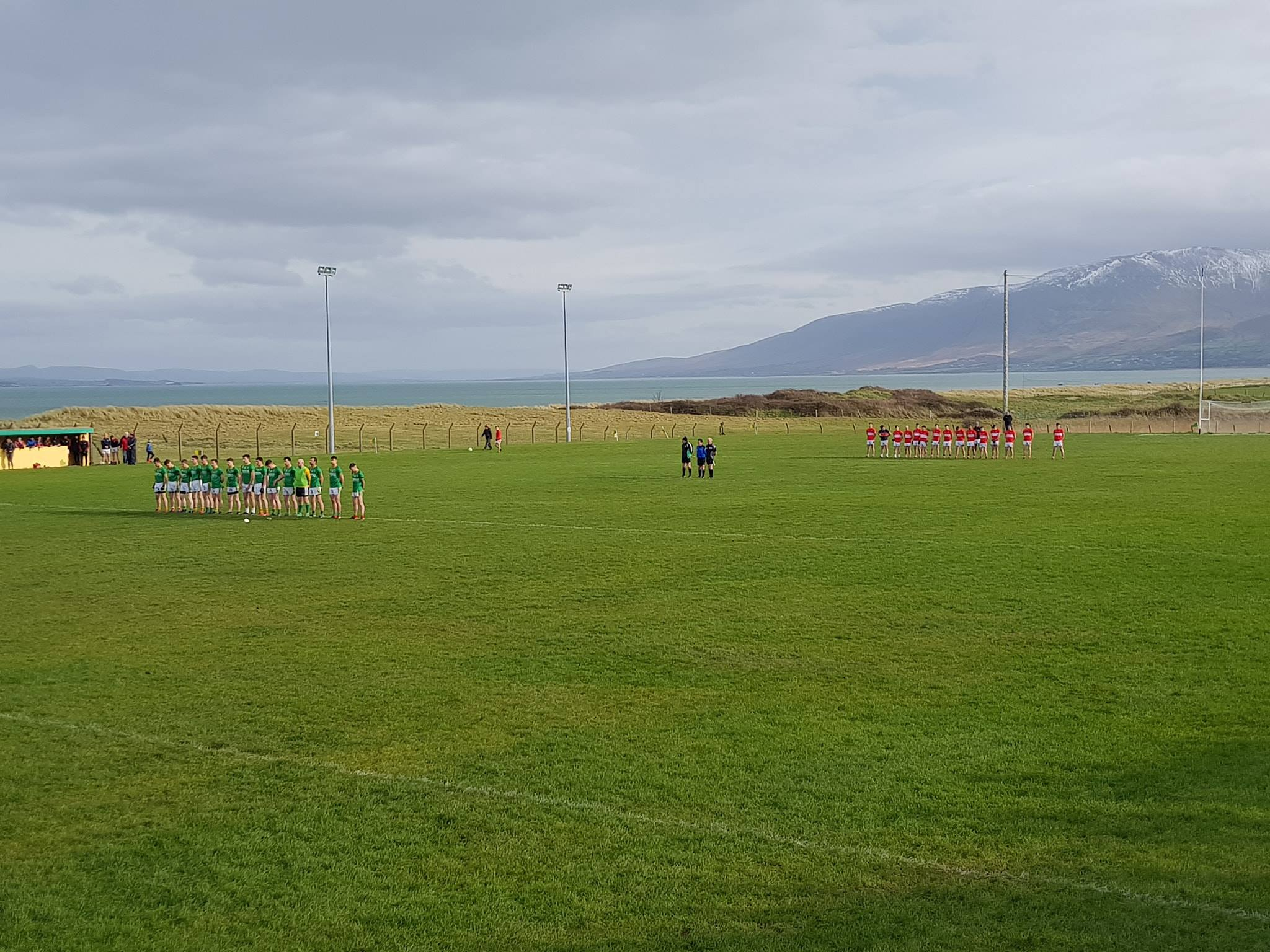
Castlegregory v Dingle 2018 West Kerry league Final

Year	Winner	Score	Opponent	Score
2025	Abha Na Scáil	0-10	Daingean Uí Chúis	0-09
2024	Daingean Uí Chúis	0-11	Castlegregory	0-10
2023	Daingean Uí Chúis	w/o	Lios Póil	scr
2022	An Ghaeltacht	2-08	Castlegregory	0-05
2021	Daingean Uí Chúis		An Ghaeltacht	
2020	Daingean Uí Chúis	0-07	An Ghaeltacht	0-05
2019	Daingean Uí Chúis			
2018	Daingean Uí Chúis	1-11	Castlegregory	1-07
2017	Lios Póil		An Ghaeltacht	
2016	Daingean Uí Chúis		Abha Na Scáil	
2015	An Ghaeltacht		Lios Póil	
2014	Daingean Uí Chúis		An Ghaeltacht	
2013	An Ghaeltacht		Lios Póil	
2012	Daingean Uí Chúis		Abha Na Scáil	
2011	Daingean Uí Chúis	2-10	Castlegregory	0-11
2010	Daingean Uí Chúis		Abha Na Scáil	
2009				
2008	Abha Na Scáíl	0-12	Lios Póil	1-08
2007	Daingean Uí Chúis	0-13	Castlegregory	0-12
2006	Lios Póil		Abha Na Scáíl	
2005	Daingean Uí Chúis		Castlegregory	
2004	Lios Póil			
2003	Abha Na Scáil		Daingean Uí Chúis	
2002	Castlegregory		Daingean Uí Chúis	

=== West Kerry Junior Championship ===
The West Kerry Junior Football Championship is a Gaelic football competition established in 1980 between the B teams of clubs affiliated to the West Kerry division of the Gaelic Athletic Association. An Ghaeltacht top the roll of honour with 18 championships.

Top Winners	
An Ghaeltacht	19
Daingean Uí Chúis	14
Caisléan Ghriaire	4
Abha na Scáil	4
Lios Póil	3
St.Pat's Blennerville	1

=== Roll of Honour ===
- 2025 - An Ghaeltacht
- 2024 - Dingle
- 2023 - An Ghaeltacht
- 2022 - An Ghaeltacht
- 2021 - Dingle
- 2020 - An Ghaeltacht
- 2019 - An Ghaeltacht
- 2018 - Dingle
- 2017 - Dingle
- 2016 - Annascaul
- 2015 - An Ghaeltacht
- 2014 - Dingle
- 2013 - An Ghaeltacht
- 2012 - An Ghaeltacht
- 2011 - Dingle
- 2010 - Dingle
- 2009 - Castlegregory
- 2008 - An Ghaeltacht
- 2007 - An Ghaeltacht
- 2006 - An Ghaeltacht
- 2005 - Castlegregory
- 2004 - Lios Póil
- 2003 - Annascaul
- 2002 - Dingle
- 2001 - An Ghaeltacht
- 2000 - An Ghaeltacht
- 1999 - An Ghaeltacht
- 1998 - Lios Póil
- 1997 - An Ghaeltacht
- 1996 - Castlegregory
- 1995 - Lios Póil
- 1994 - Blennerville
- 1993 - An Ghaeltacht
- 1992 - An Ghaeltacht
- 1991 - An Ghaeltacht
- 1990 - Castlegregory
- 1989 - Dingle
- 1988 - Annascaul
- 1987 - Dingle
- 1986 - Annascaul
- 1985 - An Ghaeltacht
- 1984 - Dingle
- 1983 - Dingle
- 1982 - Dingle
- 1981 - Dingle
- 1980 - Dingle

== All Stars ==
The West Kerry All Stars team comprises the best player in each position, regardless of club affiliation. The composition of the All Star teams are decided on the performance of individuals in the Moran's of Dingle West Kerry Championship. Compiled by a selection committee of sports journalists from local media & former players. The inaugural team was announced in 2018 and the awards have been sponsored since then by Quinn's Bar Ventry. There is also a Player of the Year award and a Young Player of the Year award. It is presented annually to the footballer who performed outstandingly in that year's West Kerry Championship.

2018

	Team of the Year	2018
1	Tomás Mac an tSaoir	An Ghaeltacht
2	Eoin Curry	Abha Na Scáil
3	Cathal Ó Lúing	An Ghaeltacht
4	Patrick O Connor	Daingean Uí Chúis
5	Gearoid Lyne	Abha Na Scáil
6	Tom O'Sullivan	Daingean Uí Chúis
7	Matthew Flaherty	Daingean Uí Chúis
8	Barry O'Sullivan	Daingean Uí Chúis
9	Rob Ó Sé	An Ghaeltacht
10	Jason Hickson	Abha Na Scáil
11	Mikey Geaney	Daingean Uí Chúis
12	Cathal Ferriter	Abha Na Scáil
13	Tomás Sheehy	Daingean Uí Chúis
14	Jimmy O Grady	Caisléan Ghriaire
15	Declan O Sullivan	Lios Póil

2018		
Player of the Year	Tomás Sheehy	Daingean Uí Chúis
Young Player of the Year	Gearoid Lyne	Abha Na Scáil
Lifetime Achievement Award	Marc Ó Sé	An Ghaeltacht

2019

	Team of the Year	2019
1.	Deividas Uosis	Daingean Uí Chúis
2.	Aidan O Connor	Daingean Uí Chúis
3.	Eoin Curry	Abha Na Scáil
4.	Colm Ó Muircheartaigh	An Ghaeltacht
5.	Matthew Flaherty	Daingean Uí Chúis
6.	Tom O'Sullivan	Daingean Uí Chúis
7.	Jason Hickson	Abha Na Scáil
8.	Barry O'Sullivan	Daingean Uí Chúis
9.	Eanna Ó Conchúir	An Ghaeltacht
10.	James Crean	Abha Na Scáil
11.	Paul Geaney	Daingean Uí Chúis
12.	Paul Devane	Daingean Uí Chúis
13.	Conor Geaney	Daingean Uí Chúis
14.	Declan O Sullivan	Lios Póil
15.	Pádraig Óigí Ó Sé	An Ghaeltacht

2019		
Player of the Year	Conor Geaney	Daingean Uí Chúis
Young Player of the Year	Killian Falvey	Abha Na Scáil
Lifetime Achievement Award	Thomas O Connor	Daingean Uí Chúis

2020

- The 2020 All Stars were not held due to the COVID-19 pandemic.

2021

	Team of the Year	2021
1.	Gavin Curran	Daingean Uí Chúis
2.	John Joe Hussey	Caisléan Ghriaire
3.	Tom Leo O Sullivan	Daingean Uí Chúis
4.	Caoimhín O'Beaglaoich	An Ghaeltacht
5.	Matthew Flaherty	Daingean Uí Chúis
6.	Padraig Ó Sé	An Ghaeltacht
7.	Michael Flannery	Daingean Uí Chúis
8.	Barry O'Sullivan	Daingean Uí Chúis
9.	Eanna Ó Conchúir	An Ghaeltacht
10.	Niall Geaney	Daingean Uí Chúis
11.	Alan Fitzgerald	Caisléan Ghriaire
12.	Dylan Geaney	Daingean Uí Chúis
13.	Maurice O'Connell	Caisléan Ghriaire
14.	Paul Geaney	Daingean Uí Chúis
15.	Conor Geaney	Daingean Uí Chúis

2021		
Player of the Year	Paul Geaney	Daingean Uí Chúis
Young Player of the Year	Dylan Geaney	Daingean Uí Chúis
Lifetime Achievement Award	Eugene Devane	Lios Póil

== See also ==
- East Kerry Senior Football Championship
- North Kerry Senior Football Championship
- Mid Kerry Senior Football Championship
