= Pat O'Shea (Gaelic footballer, born 1888) =

Irish Gaelic footballer

Pat 'Aeroplane' O'Shea
Personal information
- Native name: Pádraig Ó Sé (Irish)
- Nickname: Aeroplane
- Born: 1888 Castlegregory, County Kerry
- Died: 1980 (aged 91–92)

Sport
- Sport: Gaelic football
- Position: Mid Field
Club
- Years: Club
- 1900s–1920s: Castlegregory
Club titles
- Kerry titles: 0
Inter-county
- Years: County
- 1910-1914: Kerry
Inter-county titles
- Munster titles: 4
- All-Irelands: 2

Pat 'Aeroplane' O'Shea (1888–1980) was an Irish sportsperson. He played Gaelic football with his local club Castlegregory and was a member of the Kerry senior inter-county team between 1910 until 1914. An interview was undertaken with Pat O'Shea on Raidió na Gaeltachta in 1980 - it was aired again on 8 July 2021.
