= Annascaul =

Village in County Kerry, Ireland

Annascaul Abhainn an Scáil
- Village
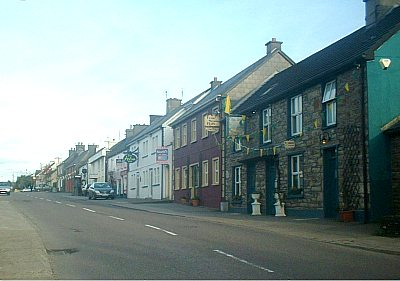
- Main Street

- Location in Ireland
- Coordinates: 52°09′11″N 10°03′05″W
- Country: Ireland
- Province: Munster
- County: County Kerry

Population (2022)
  - Total: 291
- Time zone: UTC+0 (WET)
  - Summer (DST): UTC-1 (IST (WEST))
- Irish Grid Reference: Q589019
- Website: http://www.annascaul.ie/

Annascaul or Anascaul (Irish: Abhainn an Scáil / Abha na Scáil) is a village on the Dingle Peninsula in County Kerry, Ireland. It is situated 32.9 kilometres west of Tralee on the N86 Tralee - Dingle national secondary road near its junction with the R561 regional road to Castlemaine and Farranfore leading to nearby Inch Strand. The village was recorded as having a population of 291 at the time of the 2022 census.

== Placename ==
Different suggestions as to the original meaning of the name include "Scáil's River" (Scáil Ní Mhúirnáin is a character in a local legend), "River of the Shadows", or "Ford of the Heroes".

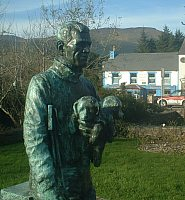
Statue of Tom Crean, with the South Pole Inn in the background

The late Tadhg Kennedy gave this explanation of the origin of the name in his submission to the Bureau of Military History of Ireland:

'The name of the village, Annascaul, is derived from the ford at that point where the road to Dingle leads across the river Scál and is a corruption of the word, Átha-na-Scáil, meaning, in English, the River of the Hero, and the hero being Cuchulainn whose grave is reputed to be on the side of the mountain above Droumavalla, north of Annascaul... There was a controversy in the "Leader" years ago about the meaning of the word Annascaul and I remember Dr. Douglas Hyde,"Beirt Fhear" (Mr. J.J. Doyle) and Mr. D.P. Moran, editor of the "Leader", visited Annascaul to carry out investigations locally into it. My grandmother determined it for them as Átha-an-scáil by the way in which she pronounced the word and her traditional knowledge that the lake, about two miles north of the village, is known as Loch-an-Scáil, and is traditionally associated with Cuchulainn, the legendary hero.'

== Geography ==
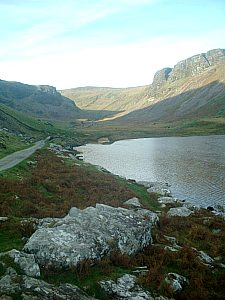
Annascaul Lake from the south, with the Slieve Mish range in the background

The Dingle Way walking route passes through the village. Annascaul Lake is situated inland and just above the village.

== History ==
The village is of relatively modern origins, having grown up around the beginning of the nineteenth century. In 1837 it was described as:

"...containing 11 houses and 92 inhabitants. This place is situated in a pleasant valley on the new mail coach road from Tralee to Dingle, to each of which it has a penny post recently established."

Annascaul was the birthplace of the Antarctic explorer Tom Crean, who was part of Robert Scott's ill-fated attempts to reach the South Pole and Ernest Shackleton's epic open boat journey from Elephant Island to South Georgia. In 2003 a statue of Crean was erected in the village opposite the South Pole Inn, the public house he owned. Irish American sculptor Jerome Connor, famous for his work the Nuns of the Battlefield in Washington D.C., was also born in Annascaul.

There was a long history in the locality, particularly around the late 19th and early 20th century, of young men joining the British Royal Navy.

== Sport ==
Annascaul GAA is the local Gaelic Athletic Association club. Annascaul FC is the local soccer club.

== See also ==
- List of towns and villages in Ireland
- Tralee and Dingle Light Railway - former narrow-gauge railway that passed through Annascaul.
