= Paul Geaney =

Kerry Gaelic footballer

Personal information
- Nickname: Paulo
- Born: 27 November 1990 (age 35) Tralee, County Kerry, Ireland
- Occupation: Barman
- Height: 1.85 m (6 ft 1 in)

Sport
- Sport: Gaelic football
- Position: Full-forward
Clubs
- Years: Club
- 2007-present 2011-2014: Dingle → University College Cork
Club titles
- Kerry titles: 1
- Munster titles: 1
- All-Ireland Titles: 1
College
- Years: College
- 2011-2014: University College Cork
College titles
- Sigerson titles: 2
Inter-county*
Years	County	Apps (scores)
2011-present	Kerry	57 (14-143)
Inter-county titles
- Munster titles: 11
- All-Irelands: 3
- NFL: 3
- All Stars: 2
- *Inter County team apps and scores correct as of match played 30 June 2024.

Paul Geaney (born 27 November 1990) is an Irish Gaelic footballer who plays for Dingle and at senior level for the Kerry county team. He usually lines out as a forward.

== Career ==
Geaney first came to prominence at juvenile and underage levels with the Dingle club. He joined the club's senior team in 2007 and won a Kerry Club Championship title in 2015. Geaney first lined out at inter-county level as captain of the Kerry minor team that won the Munster Minor Championship in 2008. After an unsuccessful two-year tenure with the Kerry under-21 team, he was drafted onto the Kerry senior football team during the 2011 league. After a number of years as a panel member, Geaney eventually broke onto the starting fifteen and was at right corner-forward when Kerry beat Donegal in the 2014 All-Ireland SFC final. His other honours include National League and Munster Championship titles.

== Personal life ==
Geaney works in the family business in Paul Geaney's Bar and Restaurant in Dingle. He married Siún Ó Sé, daughter of Páidí Ó Sé, in December 2018.

He is the grandson of Lispole man, Paudie Fitzgerald, winner of Ireland's top cycling event, the Rás Tailteann, in 1956, where he was a key figure in the renowned Kerry cycling team of the 1950s.

== Career statistics ==
As of match played 30 June 2024.

Team	Year	National League			Munster		All-Ireland		Total	
Team	Year	Division	Apps	Score	Apps	Score	Apps	Score	Apps	Score
Kerry	2011	Division 1	1	1-00	0	0-00	0	0-00	1	1-00
Kerry	2012	Division 1	0	0-00	0	0-00	0	0-00	0	0-00
Kerry	2013	Division 1	0	0-00	0	0-00	1	0-00	1	0-00
Kerry	2014	Division 1	6	3-08	2	0-09	4	1-11	12	4-28
Kerry	2015	Division 1	5	1-13	3	2-06	3	0-07	11	3-26
Kerry	2016	Division 1	1	0-00	2	2-08	2	1-07	5	3-15
Kerry	2017	Division 1	8	3-41	2	1-09	3	0-21	13	4-71
Kerry	2018	Division 1	6	1-10	2	2-12	3	0-04	11	3-26
Kerry	2019	Division 1	4	0-05	2	0-02	6	2-15	12	2-22
Kerry	2020	Division 1	6	1-07	0	0-00	—		6	1-07
Kerry	2021	Division 1	4	2-04	3	2-03	1	0-01	8	4-08
Kerry	2022	Division 1	7	0-14	2	0-06	3	0-05	12	0-25
Kerry	2023	Division 1	2	0-00	2	0-03	5	1-05	9	1-08
Kerry	2024	Division 1			2	0-02	4	0-07	6	0-09
Career total			50	12-102	22	9-60	35	5-83	107	26-245

== Honours ==
University College Cork

- Sigerson Cup: (2) 2011, 2014 (c)
- Cork Senior Football Championship: (1) 2011

Dingle

- All Ireland Senior Club Football Championship: (1) 2026 (c)
- Munster Senior Club Football Championship:(1) 2025 (c)
- Kerry Senior Football Championship:(1) 2025 (c)
- AIB GAA Club Team of the Year:(1) 2026
- Kerry Club Football Championship: (2) 2015, 2023
- Kerry County Football League Division 1: (1) 2021
- West Kerry Senior Football Championship: (13) 2007, 2010, 2012, 2013, 2014, 2016, 2018, 2019, 2020, 2021, 2022, 2023, 2024

Kerry

- All-Ireland Senior Football Championship: 2014, 2022, 2025
- Munster Senior Football Championship: 2013, 2014, 2015, 2016, 2017, 2018, 2019, 2021, 2022, 2023, 2024, 2025, 2026 (c)
- National Football League: 2017, 2020, 2021 2022, 2025
- All-Ireland Under-21 B Hurling Championship: 2010
- Munster Minor Football Championship: 2008 (c)
