= 2025 Galway county football team season =

Hurling (sport) season

Galway county football team
2025 season
Manager	Padraig Joyce
Captain	Sean Kelly
All-Ireland SFC	Quarter-Finals
Connacht SFC	Winners
National League	3rd
Top scorer Championship	Robert Finnerty (3-27)
Highest SFC attendance	27,137 (v Mayo 4 May)
Lowest SFC attendance	2,500 (v New York 6 April)

The 2025 season was Padraig Joyce's seventh year as manager of the Galway senior football team.

On January Seán Kelly was again named as captain for 2025, with Paul Conroy also retained as vice-captain.

The team was sponsored for the thirty-second year by Irish fast food restaurant chain Supermac's.

On 29 June 2025, Galway were defeated by Meath by 2–16 to 2–15 in the Quarter-Finals

== 2025 senior football management team ==
Padraig Joyce continued as manager for the seventh year with Cavan Gaels' Mickey Graham continuing as coach. Milltown's John Concannon, Kilkerrin-Clonberne's John Divilly and An Cheathrú Rua's Micheál Ó Domhnaill also continued as selectors, with Michelle Heally taking up the roll of performance analyst. Keith Begley was also part of the back-room team as a sport psychologist.

=== 2025 Senior Squad ===
On 23 January 2025 Padraig Joyce announced his 38-man panel for the National League. Under 20 championship players Matthew Thompson, Jack O'Neill, Diarmuid Kilcommins, Sam O'Neill, Shay McLinchey and Colm Costello were named in the panel.

The following players made their competitive senior debut in 2025.

- Sam O'Neill vs Armagh on 25 January.
- Colm Costello vs Mayo on 2 February.
- Matthew Thompson vs Derry on 15 February.
- Jack O'Neill vs Derry on 15 February
- Diarmuid Kilcommins vs New York on 6 April

== Panel ==
Team as per Galway vs Meath in the 2025 All-Ireland Senior Football Championship Quarter-Final, 29 June 2025

No.	Player	Position	Club
1	Conor Flaherty	Goalkeeper	Claregalway
2	Johnny McGrath	Right corner-back	Caherlistrane
3	Seán Fitzgerald	Full-back	Barna
4	Liam Silke	Left corner-back	Corofin
5	Dylan McHugh	Right half-back	Corofin
6	Seán Kelly (c)	Centre-back	Moycullen
7	Cian Hernon	Left half-back	Barna
8	Paul Conroy	Midfield	St James'
9	John Maher	Midfield	Salthill–Knocknacarra
10	Cein D'Arcy	Right half-forward	Ballyboden St Enda's
11	Matthew Tierney	Centre forward	Oughterard
12	Cillian McDaid	Left half-forward	Monivea-Abbey
13	Robert Finnerty	Right corner-forward	Salthill–Knocknacarra
14	Shane Walsh	Full-forward	Kilmacud Crokes
15	Matthew Thompson	Left corner-forward	Salthill–Knocknacarra

No.	Player	Position	Club
16	Connor Gleeson	Goalkeeper	Dunmore MacHales
17	Jack Glynn	Corner-back	Claregalway
18	Kieran Molloy	Wing-back	Corofin
19	Seán Ó Maoilchiaráin	Full-back	Oileáin Árann
20	Daniel O'Flaherty	Wing-back	Salthill–Knocknacarra
21	John Daly	Centre-back	Mountbellew–Moylough
22	Peter Cooke	Midfield	Moycullen
23	Sam O'Neill	Wing-forward	St James'
24	Tomo Culhane	Corner-forward	Salthill–Knocknacarra
25	Johnny Heaney	Wing-forward	Killanin
26	Damien Comer	Full-forward	Annaghdown

^{INJ} Player has had an injury which has affected recent involvement with the county team.
^{RET} Player has since retired from the county team.
^{WD} Player has since withdrawn from the county team due to a non-injury issue.

== Competitions ==
No FBD League in 2025.

=== National Football League 2025 ===
Match results

Round 1 (25 January 2025) – Galway 1–12, Armagh 0–9 Pearse Stadium, Salthill. Galway began their league campaign with a six-point home win. Matthew Tierney scored the game's only goal from a penalty, while Cillian O’Curraoin contributed five points.

Round 2 (1 February 2025) – Mayo 0–16, Galway 0–26, MacHale Park, Castlebar. Galway produced a strong attacking display, scoring 26 points without registering a goal. The result represented one of their biggest away wins over Mayo in recent years.

Round 3 (15 February 2025) – Derry 0–16, Galway 1–13, Celtic Park, Derry. Galway's goal kept them in contention but Derry edged the game by a single point thanks to their superior point-taking.

Round 4 (23 February 2025) – Galway 0–21, Donegal 0–14, Pearse Stadium. Galway secured their second home victory of the campaign, outscoring Donegal by seven points in Salthill.

Round 5 (2 March 2025) – Galway 1–18, Tyrone 1–18, Tuam Stadium. A tightly contested match ended level, with both sides finishing on 1–18 apiece.

Round 6 (15 March 2025) – Dublin 2–19, Galway 2–13, Croke Park, Dublin. Galway matched Dublin in goals scored but were outscored in points by six, resulting in defeat at Croke Park.

Round 7 (23 March 2025) – Galway 2–19, Kerry 3–24, Pearse Stadium. In a high-scoring match, Kerry's three goals proved decisive as they outscored Galway by eight points.

Overall

Galway finished the campaign with two wins, one draw and four defeats. Their victories came at home against Armagh and Donegal, while they also secured a notable away win against Mayo. However, defeats to Derry, Dublin and Kerry, along with a draw against Tyrone, left them mid-table in Division 1.

=== Table ===
Pos	Team	Pld	W	D	L	PF	PA	PD	Pts	Qualification
1	Mayo	7	4	1	2	133	134	−1	9	Advance to NFL Final
2	Kerry (Note: Ranked by score difference)	7	4	0	3	170	151	+19	8	Advance to NFL Final
3	Galway	7	3	2	2	143	134	+9	8	
4	Donegal	7	4	0	3	141	139	+2	8	
5	Dublin	7	4	0	3	143	142	+1	8	
6	Armagh (Note: Armagh are ranked ahead of Tyrone as they won the head-to-head game between the teams.)	7	3	1	3	144	137	+7	7	
7	Tyrone	7	3	1	3	138	131	+7	7	Relegation to 2026 NFL Division 2
8	Derry	7	0	1	6	136	180	−44	1	Relegation to 2026 NFL Division 2

Source: GAA.ie
Rules for classification: Tiebreakers

=== Championship ===
==== Connacht Senior Football Championship ====
Note that New York game that was postponed in 2020 because of Covid-19 was finally played.

Quarter-finals
5 April, Ruislip
London	0-13
Roscommon	2-26
6 April, New York City
New York	0-20
Galway	3-28
6 April, Castlebar
Mayo	2-20
Sligo	2-17

Semi-finals
20 April, Galway
Roscommon	0-18
Galway	1-24
19 April, Carrick-on-Shannon
Mayo	0-20
Leitrim	0-13

Final
4 May, Castlebar
Galway	1-17
Mayo	1-15

6 April 2025 Quarter-final	New York	0-20 – 3-28	Galway	New York
3pm EST (Irish time: 8pm GMT)				Venue: Gaelic Park
	Pts: C O'Dea 1, J Walsh 2 (1tp), K Murphy 1, F O’Reilly 7 (3tpfs, 1f), J Robinson 5, B O’Regan 4 (2fs, 1tpf)	Report	Gls: C Hernon 1, M Tierney 2 Pts: C Flaherty 2 (1tp), K Molloy 1, S Kelly 2, M Tierney 4 (1f, 1 tpf), J Maher 1, M Thompson 3, C McDaid 1, D O’Flaherty 2, Brian Mannion 1, R Finnerty 6 (3fs), F Ó Laoi 1, P Conroy 2 (1tpf), L Ó Conghaile 2	Referee: J McQuillan (Cavan)

20 April 2025 Semi-final	Roscommon	0-18 – 1-24	Galway	Galway
				Venue: Pearse Stadium

4 May 2025 Final	Mayo	1-15 – 1-17	Galway	Castlebar
				Venue: McHale Park
				Referee: Paddy Neilan (Roscommon)

=== Group 4 ===
Pos	Team	Pld	W	D	L	PF	PA	PD	Pts	Qualification
1	Armagh	3	2	0	1	78	70	+8	4 (Note: Armagh are ranked ahead of Dublin as they won the head-to-head game between the teams.)	Advance to quarter-final
2	Dublin	3	2	0	1	62	64	−2	4	Advance to preliminary quarter-final
3	Galway	3	1	1	1	74	74	0	3	Advance to preliminary quarter-final
4	Derry	3	0	1	2	69	75	−6	1	

Source: GAA
Notes:

17 May 2025 All-Ireland Group 4 Rd 1	Galway	2–14 (20) – (21) 1–18	Dublin	Salthill
17:00		(HT: 0-08 – 1-09)		Venue: Pearse Stadium
	Gls: R Finnerty 1, M Thompson 1 Pts: R Finnerty 0–6 (1f, 1tp), M Tierney 0–2, S Walsh 0–2 (tp), M Thompson 0–1, J McGrath 0–1, C McDaid 0–1, J Maher 0–1	Report	Gls: C Costello 1 Pts: C Costello 0–3 (2f), C O'Callaghan 0–3, S Bugler 0–3, L O'Dell 0–3, K McGinnis 0–2, C Kilkenny 0–2, B O'Leary 0–1, T Lahiff 0–1	Referee: David Gough (Meath); Attendance: ~18,000

1 June 2025 All-Ireland Group 4 Rd 2	Derry	2–20 (26) – (26) 4–14	Galway	Derry
14:00		(HT: 1–11 – 2–6)		Venue: Celtic Park
	Gls: C Glass 1, N Loughlin 1 Pts: S McGuigan 0–4 (1tpf, 1f), C Glass 0–3 (1'45), B Rogers 0–3 (1tp), P Cassidy 0–3 (tp), N Loughlin 0–2, L Murray 0–2, C McFaul 0–1, N Toner 0–1, C Doherty 0–1	Report	Gls: M Tierney 2, R Finnerty 1, S Walsh 1 Pts: R Finnerty 0–3 (1f), M Thompson 0–2, P Crooke 0–2 (tp), S Kelly 0–1, P Conroy 0–1, J Maher 0–1, S O'Neill 0–1, S Walsh 0–1 (f), C Darcy 0–1, D Comer 0–1

14 June 2025 All-Ireland Group 4 Rd 3	Galway	2–22 (28) – (27) 0–27	Armagh	Cavan
18:30		(HT: 0–7 – 0–15)		Venue: Breffni Park
	Gls: R Finnerty 1 (pen), J Maher; Pts: S Walsh 0–9 (1tpf, 1f), R Finnerty 0–4, P Cooke 0–3 (1tp), C McDaid 0–2, C Darcy 0–1, M Tierney 0–1, C Sweeney 0–1, P Conroy 0–1	Report	Pts: E Rafferty 0–7 (2tpf, 1tp), R McQuillan 0–3, N Grimley 0–3 (1tp), C McConville 0–3, D McMullan 0–2, R O'Neill 0–1, J Burns 0–1, P McGrane 0–1, S Campbell 0–1, S McPartlan 0–1, C Turbitt 0–1, A Murnin 0–1, J Duffy 0–1

22 June 2025 Preliminary quarter-final	Down	3–21 (30)–(32) 2–26	Galway	Newry
13:45	3	Report	2	Attendance: 14,435

29 June 2025 Quarter-final	Meath	2-16 (22)–(21) 2–15	Galway	Dublin
13:45				Stadium: Croke Park; Attendance: 70,530

== Results ==
25 January
14:00
Round 1

Galway	1–12 – 0–9	Armagh
Matthew Tierney 1-1 (1-0 pen), Colm O’Curraoin 0-5 (3f, 1 '45), Shane Walsh 0-2 (1f), Finian Ó Laoi and Daniel O'Flaherty (0-01 each)	Report	Oisín Conaty (3f) and Ruairi Grugan (0-04 each), Conor Turbitt (0-01)

Pearse Stadium, Salthill
Referee: Conor Lane
1 February
19:30
Round 2

Mayo	0–16 – 0–26	Galway
Shane Walsh 0-09 (2tp, 2tpf), Cillian Ó Curraoin 0-08 (1f, 2tp, 2tpf), Paul Conroy (0-03), Seán Kelly nad Robert Finnerty (0-02 each), Conor Gleeson and Dylan McHugh (0-01 each)	Report	Paul Towey 0-05 (1tp), Ryan O'Donoghue (3f) and Dylan Neary (0-03), C. Reid (0-02), Sean Morahan, D. McHugh and F. Irwin (0-01 each)

MacHale Park, Castlebar
Referee: N Mooney
15 February
17:00
Round 3

Derry	0–16 – 1–13	Galway
Shane Walsh 0-08 (2tp, 1tpf, 1f), Dylan McHugh (1-00), Cein Darcy, Cillian Ó Curraoin, and Matthew Tierney (0-01 each)	Report	Shane McGuigan 0-08 (1tpf, 3f), Paul Cassidy and Lachlan Murray (0-03 each), Neil McNicholl (0-01)

Celtic Park, Derry
Referee: David Gough
23 February
14:00
Round 4

Galway	0–21 – 0–14	Donegal
Shane Walsh 0-11 (3tp, 1tpf), Robert Finnerty 0-03 (1tpf), Matthew Tierney, Conor Flaherty (0-02 each), Daneil O'Flaherty, John Maher and Liam Silke (0-01 each)	Report	Daire Ó Baoill 0-06 (2tpf), Peadar Mogan (1tp), Conor O'Donnell (1f) and Ciaran Thompson (0-02 each), Oisín Gallen and Shane O'Donnell (0-01 each)

Pearse Stadium, Salthill
Referee: David Coldrick
2 March
14:00
Round 5

Galway	1–18 – 1–18	Tyrone
Shane Walsh 1-07 (1 pen, 3tpf), Robert Finnerty 0-04 (2tpf), Cillian McDaid and Jack O'Neill (1f) (0-02 each), Cein Darcy (0-01)	Report	Darragh Canavan 1-05 (1 pen, 2f), Mark Bradley 0-07 (1tpf, 1f), Matthew Donnelly 0-03 (1tp), Conn Kilpatrick (0-01)

Tuam Stadium
Referee: Brendan Cawley
15 March
19:30
Round 6

Dublin	2–19 – 2–13	Galway
Damien Comer (1-02), John Maher (1-00), Robert Finnerty (1f) and Matthew Tierney (0-02 each), Cein Darcy, Cillian McDaid, Matthew Thompson and Liam Ó Conghaile (0-01 each)	Report	Sean Bulger (2-00), Cormac Costello 0-05 (2f, 1 45), Con O'Callaghan and Luke Breathnach (0-04 each), Ross McGarry (0-02), Cian Murphy, Killian McGinnis, Lorcan O'Dell and Cian Murphy (0-01 each)

Croke Park, Dublin
Referee: Martin McNally
23 March
14:00
Round 7

Galway	2–19 – 3–24	Kerry
Robert Finnerty 1-06 (5f), Matthew Tierney 1-03 (1tpf), K. Molloy 0-03 (1tp), Paul Conroy 0-02 (1tp), Cillian McDaid, Cillian Ó Curraoin (1f), Finian Ó Laoi, Damien Comer and Johnny Heaney (0-01 each)	Report	Paul Geaney 0-07 (6f), Dylan Geaney (1-02), David Clifford 0-03 (1f), D. Bourke and Gavin White (1-00 each), Paudie Clifford, Tony Brosnan, BD. O'Sullivan and C. Geaney (0-02 each), Killian Spillane, D. Casey, Brian Ó Beaglaoich, M. Burns (0-01 each)

Pearse Stadium, Salthill
Referee: D. O'Mahoney
