= 2026 Connacht Senior Football Championship final =

- Event: 2026 Connacht Senior Football Championship
Roscommon	Galway
3–21	2–22
- Date: 10 May 2026
- Venue: Dr Hyde Park, Roscommon
- Referee: Seán Hurson (Tyrone)
- Attendance: 22,799

The 2026 Connacht Senior Football Championship final was played at Dr Hyde Park in Roscommon on 10 May 2026. It was contested by Roscommon and Galway. Roscommon won their 25th championship and their first since 2019. It was Roscommon's first home win over Galway since 1990 at the same stage.

== Route to final ==
Quarter-final: Roscommon 5-22 New York 1-10; Galway (BYE)

Semi-final: Roscommon 2-25 Mayo 1-18; Galway 1-20 Leitrim 2-12

== Match details ==
10 May 2026

Roscommon	3–21 – 2–22	Galway
Darragh Heneghan 2-2, Diarmuid Murtagh 0-7 (1tpf, 2f), Robert Heneghan 1-0, Conor Ryan 0-3 (1tp), Daire Cregg 0-3 (1tp, 1f), Paul Carey 0-2 (tp), Dylan Ruane 0-1, Senan Lambe 0-1, Keith Doyle 0-1, Conor Carroll 0-1 ('45)	Report	Shane Walsh 0-9 (2tp, 1tpf, 1'45), Damien Comer 1-2, Robert Finnerty 1-1, Paul Conroy 0-4 (2tp), Kieran Molloy 0-2 (tp), Seán Kelly 0-2 (1f), Céin D'Arcy 0-1, Dylan McHugh 0-1

Dr Hyde Park, Roscommon
Attendance: 22,799
Referee: Seán Hurson (Tyrone)

Roscommon	Galway

GK	1	Conor Caroll
FB	2	Patrick Gavin (substituted off) 56'
FB	3	Caelim Keogh
FB	4	Eoin McCormack
HB	5	Eoin Ward	(substituted off) 51'
HB	6	Ronan Daly
HB	7	Senan Lambe
MF	8	Keith Doyle
MF	9	Conor Ryan	(substituted off) 64'
HF	10	Dylan Ruane
HF	11	Enda Smith
HF	12	Darragh Heneghan	(substituted off) 65'
FF	13	Diarmuid Murtagh (c)
FF	14	Colm Neary	(substituted off) 62'
FF	15	Robert Heneghan	(substituted off) 46'
Substitutes:
	16	Aaron Brady
	17	Niall Higgins
	18	Robbie Dolan
	19	Ruaidhrí Fallon	(substituted on) 51'
	20	Brian Stack
	21	Jack Duggan
	22	Shane Cunnane	(substituted on) 64'
	23	Daire Cregg	(substituted on) 46'
	24	Paul Carey	(substituted on) 56'
	25	Conor Hand	(substituted on) 62'
	26	Cian McKeon	(substituted on) 65'
Manager:
Mark Dowd

GK	1	Conor Flaherty
FB	2	Johnny McGrath
FB	3	Seán Kelly
FB	4	Jack Glynn
HB	5	Dylan McHugh
HB	18	Kieran Molloy	(substituted off) 51'
HB	7	Liam Silke
MF	8	Paul Conroy	(substituted off) 51'
MF	9	John Maher (c)
HF	10	Daniel O'Flaherty	(substituted off) 36'
HF	11	Cillian McDaid	(substituted off) 61'
HF	12	Cein Darcy
FF	13	Robert Finnerty	(substituted off) 60'
FF	14	Shane Walsh
FF	21	Ryan Roche	(substituted off) 42'
Substitutes:
	16	Conor Gleeson
	17	Brian Cogger
	6	John Daly	(substituted on) 51'
	19	Seán Mulkerrin
	20	Cian Hernon	(substituted on) 51'
	15	Liam Ó Conghaile
	22	Matthew Tierney	(substituted on) 60'
	23	Finnian Ó Laoi	(substituted on) 36'
	24	Ciarán Mulhern
	25	Shane McGrath	(substituted on) 61'
	26	Damien Comer	(substituted on) 42'
Manager:
Pádraic Joyce

Man of the Match:

Darragh Heneghan
