= 2022 All-Ireland Senior Football Championship final =

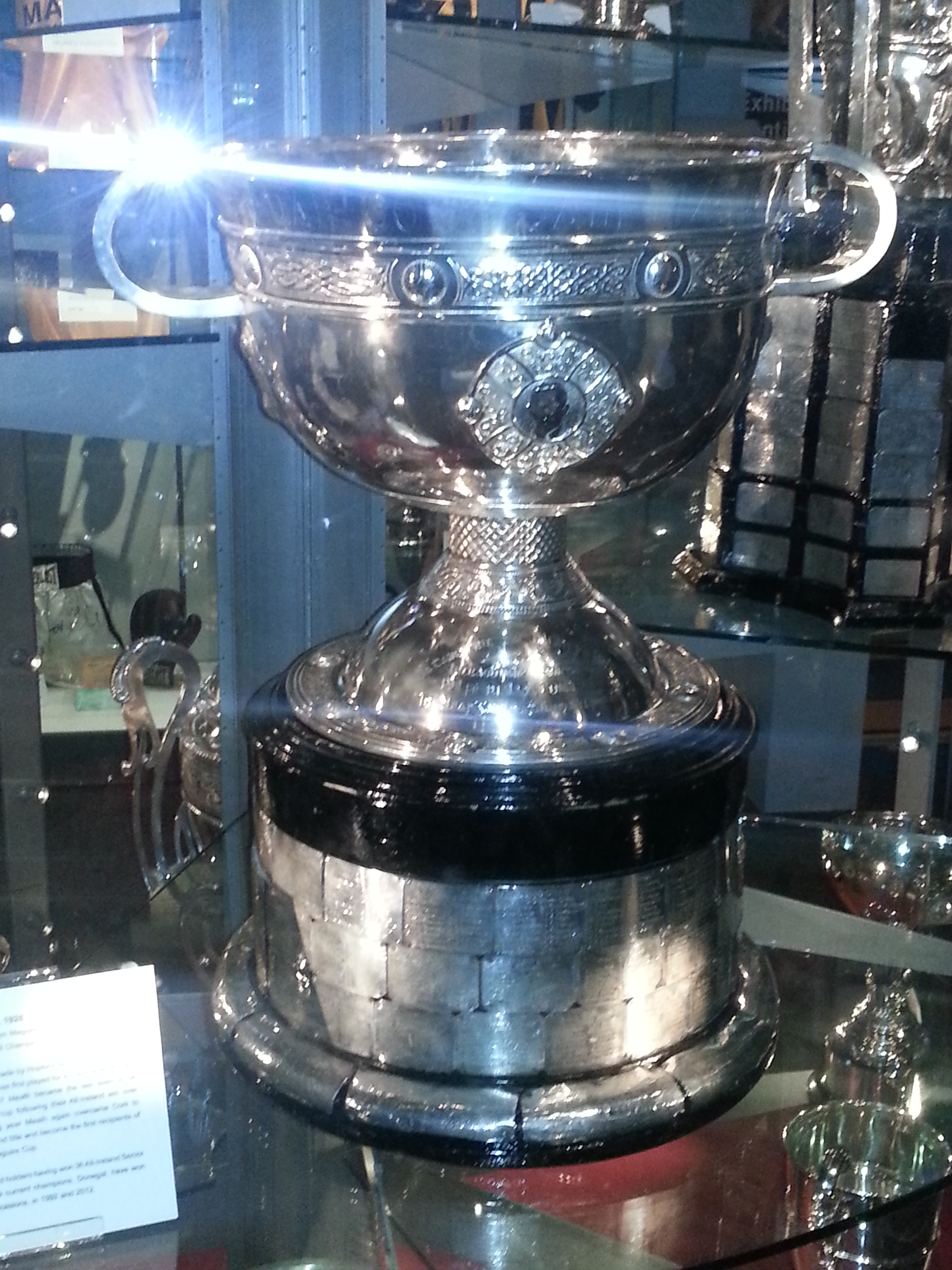
- Event: 2022 All-Ireland Senior Football Championship
Kerry	Galway
0–20	0–16
- Date: 24 July 2022
- Venue: Croke Park, Dublin
- Man of the Match: David Clifford
- Referee: Sean Hurson (Tyrone)
- Attendance: 82,300
- Weather: Breezy with sunny spells and scattered showers 22 °C (72 °F)

The 2022 All-Ireland Senior Football Championship final was a Gaelic football match played at Croke Park in Dublin on 24 July 2022 between Galway and Kerry, the culmination of the 2022 All-Ireland Senior Football Championship. This was the earliest in the year that the final has ever taken place. It was the 135th final of that sport's primary competition, the All-Ireland Senior Football Championship.

Munster champion Kerry took on Connacht champion Galway. It was the eighth time the teams had met in the final; Galway won the first encounter in a final replay in 1938.

Kerry won the final by a margin of four points, on a scoreline of 0–20 to 0–16 to claim their 38th title.

The final was played before a capacity attendance of 82,300 people. An average of 862,000 people watched the game, with a peak figure of 1.09 million as the match reached its climax. The game received a 75% audience share.

The game was televised nationally on RTÉ2 as part of The Sunday Game live programme, presented by Joanne Cantwell from the Croke Park studio, with analysis from Ciarán Whelan, Seán Cavanagh and Pat Spillane. Match commentary was provided by Darragh Maloney, assisted by Kevin McStay. This was Spillane's last appearance as a pundit on The Sunday Game after three decades, having decided to retire at the end of the 2022 GAA season. The game was also televised internationally by Sky Sports, this being their final GAA broadcast after announcing a mutual agreement to end their broadcast partnership in October.

== Background ==
Kerry entered the game as the most successful Gaelic football team in the history of the competition, having previously won 37 since the competition's inception in 1887. They were aiming to win their first All-Ireland since 2014 and an unprecedented 38th All-Ireland title. Galway were the third most successful team, having won nine.

Galway's qualification for the final was the first time since 2010 that a team other than Donegal, Dublin, Mayo or Tyrone made the final.

It was Galway's first All-Ireland final since winning in 2001. Galway aimed to win a tenth All-Ireland; this would make them only the third county to reach double figures in the all-time rankings.

The two counties have met in the final on seven previous occasions, with Galway winning three of these (1938, 1964, 1965) and Kerry winning four (1940, 1941, 1959, 2000).

Kerry were priced at odds of 1/3 to win the match, with Galway at 10/3 and the draw at 8/1. Pundits from outside the counties involved, such as Colm O'Rourke, tipped Kerry to win.

== Paths to the final ==
=== Galway ===
24 April 2022 Connacht Quarter-final	Mayo	0–16 – 1–14	Galway	MacHale Park, Castlebar
	Pts: Cillian O'Connor 6f, Ryan O'Donoghue 4 (1m), James Carr 2, Lee Keegan, Eoghan McLaughlin, Diarmuid O'Connor, Kevin McLoughlin 1 each	Report	Gls: Johnny Heaney 1 Pts: Shane Walsh 5 (3f, 2 '45), Johnny Heaney 1, Paul Conroy 3, Kieran Molloy, Niall Daly, Robert Finnerty, Damien Comer, Cillian McDaid 1 each	Referee: David Coldrick (Meath); Attendance: 24,557

8 May 2022 Connacht Semi-final	Galway	4–20 – 0–09	Leitrim	Pearse Stadium, Galway
	Gls: Patrick Kelly 2-1, Shane Walsh 0-6 (5fs), Niall Daly and Owen Gallagher 1-0 each, Cillian McDaid and Rob Finnerty (1m) 0-3 each, Paul Conroy 0-2, John Daly, Finnian Ó Laoi, Matthew Tierney, Johnny Heaney, and Dessie Conneely 0-1 each.	Report	Gls: Keith Beirne and Ryan O'Rourke (1f) 0-2 each, Donal Wrynn, Conor Dolan, Ciarán Cullen, Tom Prior and Riordan O'Rourke (m) 0-1 each.	Referee: P Faloon (Down); Attendance: 4,749

29 May 2022 Connacht Final	Galway	2–19 – 2–16	Roscommon	Pearse Stadium, Galway
	Gls: Shane Walsh 1-6 (1f, 245s), Rob Finnerty 0-5, Patrick Kelly 1-0, Damien Comer 0-3, Johnny Heaney 0-2, Kieran Molloy, Cillian McDaid, and Paul Conroy 0-1 each.	Report	Gls: Conor Cox 0-5 (3fs), Conor Daly and Diarmuid Murtagh (1f) 1-1 each, Ultan Harney 0-3, Donie Smith 0-2 (1f), Ciaráin Murtagh, Cian McKeon, Cathal Heneghan, and Enda Smith 0-1 each.	Referee: Joe McQuillan (Cavan); Attendance: 21,419

26 June 2022 All-Ireland Quarter-final	Galway	2–21 (27) – (27) 3–18 (a.e.t.) (4–1 pen)	Armagh	Croke Park, Dublin
13:45
	Gls: Cillian McDaid 1, Johnny Heaney 1 Pts: Shane Walsh 6 (5f), Cillian McDaid 2, Robert Finnerty 4, Damien Comer 3, Matthew Tierney 2, Patrick Kelly 1, Finnian O Laoi 1, Kieran Molloy 1, Paul Conroy 1 Penalty kicks Shane Walsh; Damien Comer; Robert Finnerty; Matthew Tierney	Report	Gls: Rory Grugan 1, Aidan Nugent 1, Conor Turbitt 1 Pts: Rory Grugan 3 (2f), Aidan Nugent 2 (1m), Conor Turbitt 1, Rian O'Neill 4 (3f), Stefan Campbell 3, Jarlath Og Burns 1, Conor O'Neill 1, Eoin Woods 1, Jemar Hall 1, Justin Kieran 1 Penalty kicks Stefan Campbell; Rian O'Neill; Conor Turbitt	Referee: David Coldrick (Meath); Attendance: 71,353

9 July 2022 All-Ireland Semi-final	Galway	2–08 (14) – (9) 1–06	Derry	Croke Park, Dublin
17:30		(HT: 0–03 – 0–04)
	Gls: Damien Comer 2 Pts: Damien Comer 2, Shane Walsh 4 (3f and 1 45), John Daly and Johnny Heaney 1 each	Report	Gls: Lachlan Murray 1 Pts: Shane McGuigan 3 (2f), Brendan Rogers 2, Niall Loughlin 1	Referee: Brendan Crawley (Kildare); Attendance: 68,830

=== Kerry ===
7 May 2022 Munster Semi-final	Kerry	0–23 – 0–11	Cork	Pairc Ui Rinn, Cork
	Pts: Sean O'Shea 10 (7f, 1 '45), David Clifford 4 (3f), Stephen O'Brien, Paudie Clifford, Paul Geaney 2 each, Diarmuid O'Connor, Tony Brosnan, Micheal Burns 1 each	Report	Pts: Stephen Sherlock 6 (5f), Cathail O'Mahony 3, Kevin O'Donovan and Eoghan McSweeney 1 each	Referee: Brendan Cawley (Kildare); Attendance: 10,743

28 May 2022 Munster Final	Kerry	1–28 – 0–08	Limerick	Fitzgerald Stadium, Killarney
	Gls: Killian Spillane (1-3), Sean O’Shea (0-6), one ‘45, one free, Paul Geaney (0-4, one mark), Tony Brosnan and Tom O’Sullivan (0-3), Brian Ó Beaglaoich, Paudie Clifford, Micheál Burns(0-2 each), Gavin White, Stephen O’Brien, Adrian Spillane (0-1 each )	Report	Gls: Cian Sheehan (0-3) Josh Ryan (0-2, one ’45, one free), Iain Corbett (0-2), Gordon Brown (0-1)	Referee: Martin McNally (Monaghan); Attendance: 14,587

26 June 2022 All-Ireland Quarter-final	Kerry	1–18 (21) – (13) 0–13	Mayo	Croke Park, Dublin
17:00
	Gls: David Clifford 1 Pts: David Clifford 3 (2 marks, 1 free), Paul Geaney 4 (1 mark), Tom O’Sullivan 3, Sean O’Shea 3 (1f), David Moran 2, Graham O’Sullivan, Gavin White, Killian Spillane 1 each	Report	Pts: Cillian O’Connor 3 (2f), Jordan Flynn 2, Stephen Coen, Aidan O’Shea, Matthew Ruane, Conor Loftus, James Carr, Kevin McLoughlin, Jack Carney, Rob Hennelly (free) 1 each	Referee: David Gough (Meath); Attendance: 71,353

10 July 2022 All-Ireland Semi-final	Dublin	1–13 (16) – (17) 1–14	Kerry	Croke Park, Dublin
15:30		(HT: 0–06 – 1–08)
	Gls: Cormac Costello 1 Pts: Ciarán Kilkenny 3, Dean Rock 3 (3f), Lee Gannon 1, John Small 1, Seán Bugler 1, Brian Fenton 1, Paddy Small 1, Brian Howard 1, James McCarthy 1	Report	Gls: Seán O'Shea 1 Pts: Seán O'Shea 4 (2f), David Clifford 6 (1f, 1 mark), Paudie Clifford 2, Dara Moynihan 1, Tom O’Sullivan 1	Referee: Paddy Neilan (Roscommon); Attendance: 73,609

== Pre-match ==
Galway International Arts Festival and Galway City Council arranged to screen the final in a large tent in Galway, with tickets being free of charge.

Demand for tickets for the final was extremely high. Kerry made tickets available for a post-match party at a Dublin nightclub. The scramble for coaches and trains was also unmatched. A special extra Iarnród Éireann train for the final was sold out in minutes, reflecting the huge demand for train transport to and from the game.

The Athlone Railway Bridge was lit up in maroon and white colours in a show of support for the Galway footballers.

On 13 July, Tyrone's Sean Hurson was named as referee for the final, his first All-Ireland SFC final.

Immediately prior to the match, the Kerry team that won the 1997 All-Ireland Final, along with the Dublin and Meath teams that won the 1995 and 1996 All-Ireland Finals were presented to the crowd.

== Match ==
=== Summary ===
Prior to the game, Kerry were the favourites to win. Galway had the first score of the encounter, a '45 by Shane Walsh in the 5th minute. Three minutes later, Galway had the first goal chance of the day but Johnny Heaney's effort was partially blocked by Kerry's Stephen O'Brien, and the ball went over the bar. Kerry's opening point arrived a minute later, David Clifford putting over after calling for the mark in front of goals.

Kerry were surprisingly poor in the first half. Often stripped of possession when they took the ball into the tackle, facing a heavily manned Galway defence, they were unable to create any goal chances or much in the way of flowing moves. Galway, as the underdogs, played dominantly throughout the opening 35 minutes, scoring seven points to take a one-point lead in at half-time, 0–8 to 0–7, resulting in a rousing rendition of "The Fields of Athenry" ringing out around Croke Park. Shooting into the Hill goal, Galway continued to be far more economical in attack. At six apiece, corner-back Jack Glynn side-stepped a tackle, darted into traffic, somehow extricated himself before clipping over a point.

By half-time, the wide tally read 7–1 to Kerry and the consensus was they were labouring under the pressure of local expectancy. However, after the second half began, the game took on a different complexion when Kerry stepped up their game. The third quarter featured some outstanding passages of play. The teams were level four times in the opening ten minutes of the second half before Kieran Molloy and Shane Walsh sent Galway two clear. Yet Kerry found a way to gain a stronger grip on the exchanges.

On 67 minutes, with pressure ratcheting up on Kerry, Damien Comer, largely blunted as an attacking force, won a turnover near the Cusack Stand, was shunted to the deck and denied a free. He managed to feed the ball out to John Daly who then went to round the tackle of Spillane. As the players grappled, Tyrone referee Sean Hurson immediately whistled for a Kerry free, signalling that Daly had grabbed Spillane's arm in contact. The Galway players raged at the call, Daly appealing in vain to the linesman for moral support. Amid a sustained volley of boos – aimed at the referee Hurson, his first All-Ireland SFC final, rather than the kicker – David Clifford curled over the lead score from a very tight angle.

Kerry's opening 35 minutes were weak, but a strong final quarter and late points from David Clifford, Killian Spillane, Gavin White and Seán O'Shea with five minutes remaining saw the team win the game by four points, to claim their 38th title. Above all, it was a game adorned by majestic displays from the both teams' most gifted forwards, Shane Walsh and David Clifford. Walsh and Clifford scored 0-09 and 0-08 respectively, with Clifford having a 100% shooting record in the second-half. Winning the final quarter by six points was reflective of their control to land the prize this group had long desired.

The nine points scored by Shane Walsh made this the seventh ever time that a losing player had scored nine points or more in a senior football final, following Mickey Fay (Meath, 10pts, 1970), Seamus Leydon (Galway, 9pts, 1971), Peter Canavan (Tyrone, 11pts, 1995) and Cillian O'Connor (Mayo, 9pts, 2013; 10pts, 2016 replay; 9pts, 2020).

=== Details ===
RTÉ
Sky Sports

24 July 2022
15:30 IST (UTC+1)
Final

Report

Kerry	0–20 – 0–16	Galway
(HT: 0–07 – 0–08)
Pts: David Clifford 8 (3f, 2 mark), Seán O'Shea 3 (3f), Paudie Clifford 2, Killian Spillane 2, Graham O’Sullivan 1, Paul Geaney 1 (1 mark), Diarmuid O'Connor 1, Stephen O’Brien 1, Gavin White 1		Pts: Shane Walsh 9 (4f, 1 '45), Cillian McDaid 4, Jack Glynn 1, Kieran Molloy 1, Johnny Heaney 1

Croke Park, Dublin
Referee: Sean Hurson (Tyrone)
Attendance: 82,300
Standby: Paddy Neilan (Roscommon)
Linesman: Barry Cassidy (Derry)
Sideline: Sean Laverty (Antrim)
Umpires: Mark Coney (Ardboe O'Donovan Rossa), Mel Taggart (Clonoe O'Rahilly's), Cathal Forbes (Ardboe O'Donovan Rossa), Martin Conway (Moortown St Malachy's)

Kerry	Galway

1	Shane Ryan
2	Graham O'Sullivan
3	Jason Foley
4	Tom O'Sullivan
5	Brian Ó Beaglaoich	(substituted off) 64'
6	Tadhg Morley
7	Gavin White
8	David Moran	(substituted off) HT'
9	Jack Barry
10	Diarmuid O'Connor
11	Seán O'Shea (c)
12	Stephen O'Brien	(substituted off) 57'
13	Paudie Clifford	(substituted off) 44-47', 74'
14	David Clifford	(yellow card) 25'
15	Paul Geaney	(substituted off) HT'
Substitutes:
16	Shane Murphy
17	Paul Murphy	(substituted on) 64'
18	Killian Spillane	(substituted on) HT'
19	Adrian Spillane	(substituted on) HT'
20	Micheál Burns	(substituted on) 57'
21	Joe O'Connor (c)	(substituted on) 74'
22	Tony Brosnan
23	Gavin Crowley
24	Jack Savage	(substituted on) 44-47'
25	Jack O'Shea
26	Stefan Okunbor
Manager:
Jack O'Connor

1	Connor Gleeson
2	Liam Silke
3	Seán Kelly (c)
4	Jack Glynn
5	Dylan McHugh
6	John Daly
7	Kieran Molloy
8	Paul Conroy	(substituted off) 58'
9	Cillian McDaid
10	Patrick Kelly
11	Matthew Tierney	(substituted off) 75'
12	Johnny Heaney	(substituted off) 63'
13	Robert Finnerty	(substituted off) 47'
14	Damien Comer
15	Shane Walsh
Substitutes:
16	James Keane
17	James Foley
18	Billy Mannion
19	Cathal Sweeney	(substituted on) 58'
20	Niall Daly	(substituted on) 75'
21	Paul Kelly
22	Owen Gallagher
23	Finnian Ó Laoi	(substituted on) 47'
24	Eoin Finnerty	(substituted on) 63'
25	Dessie Conneely
26	Dylan Canney
Manager:
Pádraic Joyce

Man of the Match:
David Clifford (Kerry)

== Post-match ==
Kerry captains Seán O'Shea and Joe O'Connor accepted the Sam Maguire Cup from GAA president Larry McCarthy in the Hogan Stand. In his post-match speech, O'Shea thanked the Kerry panel, selectors, and back room team for their work throughout the year and declared that Paddy Tally was now an "honourary [sic] Kerry man" after his coaching impact in the 2022 season.

=== Reaction ===
Kerry captain Seán O'Shea spoke to RTÉ after the match about leading Kerry to an All-Ireland and particularly given there was a "barren" period for the county. Speaking to RTÉ Sport, O'Shea said: "To finally get over the line is like a weight lifted off your shoulders".

Man of the match David Clifford speaking to RTÉ after the match said lifting the Sam Maguire Cup was "something I dreamt of all my life". He said: "It is very hard to put into words. I was always confident we'd get over the line even though over the last few years it did not work out for us".

Kerry manager Jack O'Connor speaking after the match said that he "enjoyed the year" in working with the squad. Speaking to RTÉ Sport, O'Connor said: "We had great fun, great craic. I'm a bit long in the tooth to be feeling pressure."

Galway manager Pádraic Joyce spoke to RTÉ after the match and paid tribute to his squad and their efforts. Speaking to RTÉ Sport, Joyce said: "We were in control in the game for a long time. I think overall people were very good, we worked the first-half really well and got our match-ups set-up." However, he said he could not hide his annoyance over a free awarded against John Daly in the closing stages, saying he "could not get over it."

Outgoing RTÉ pundit Pat Spillane, who watched his two nephews Killian and Adrian Spillane win their first All-Ireland medals, remembered his late father Tom, who he said on television afterwards "would have been a proud man to now have 21 All-Ireland medals into his house". He told The Sunday Game Live: "In 1964, my father was a selector on the Kerry team against Galway. The night before the game he had a pain in his chest. He would not go to the doctor and went to the game the following day as a selector. He was dead by Tuesday. Kerry-Galway matches to me always bring back this memory. He would have been a proud man to have 21 All-Ireland medals into his house. It's just a special day."

Highlights of the final were shown on The Sunday Game programme which aired at 9:30pm that night on RTÉ2 and was presented by Des Cahill with match analysis from Colm Cooper, Colm O'Rourke, Rory Gallagher, Éamonn Fitzmaurice, Noelle Healy and Oisín McConville.

=== Awards ===
David Clifford won the man of the match award which was presented by GAA president Larry McCarthy at the Kerry team's celebration banquet in Dublin. He also won The Sunday Game Footballer of the Year award. The Sunday Game panel also picked their 2022 Team of the Year on the Sunday night programme, with seven members of the Kerry team and four members of the Galway team included.

Galway's Shane Walsh was voted Footballer of the Week on the GAA.ie website on 27 July, three days after the final.

=== Celebrations ===
The Kerry team made their way on an open deck bus from Boherbee to a "Welcome Home" reception in Denny Street at around 6:30pm. Celebrations commenced in Tralee with live music on the Denny Street platform at 4:15pm, where crowds lined the streets of the town to a reception at the Ashe Memorial Hall. Among the attendees was the Minister for Education, Norma Foley. They then travelled to the Fitzgerald Stadium at 8pm where more than 10,000 people attended, and then to the Gleneagle Hotel in Killarney where further celebrations took place at 9pm. Speaking in Tralee, joint-captain Seán O'Shea said: "To be here today and see this crowd is unbelievable." He paid tribute to Galway, and said there was great respect between the two counties.

Meanwhile, the Galway team, as runners-up, also had a homecoming celebration the day after the final to honour both the senior team and the minor team who won the All-Ireland Minor Football Championship. Both teams visited Tuam Stadium and Pearse Stadium between 4pm and 7pm respectively, while the senior footballers also came to the Fair Green in Ballinasloe beforehand en route to Tuam.
