= Armagh v Galway (2022 All-Ireland Senior Football Championship) =

Football match at Croke Park in Dublin

2022 All-Ireland Football Championship Quarter-Final
- Event: 2022 All-Ireland Senior Football Championship
Galway	Armagh
2–21 (27)	3–18 (27)
- After extra-time Galway won 4–1 on penalties
- Date: 26 June 2022
- Venue: Croke Park, Dublin
- Man of the Match: Cillian McDaid (Galway)
- Referee: David Coldrick (Meath)
- Attendance: 71,353
- Weather: 16 °C (61 °F), Sunny and showery

The Armagh vs Galway football match that took place on 26 June 2022 at Croke Park in Dublin, Ireland, was the third quarter-final match of the 2022 All-Ireland Senior Football Championship. Galway reached the stage with an undefeated record in the competition, having won the 2022 Connacht Senior Football Championship. Armagh reached this stage through the qualifiers. The game was administered by Meath officials led by Blackhall Gaels referee David Coldrick.

The game was noteworthy as the first knockout match in the All-Ireland SFC Series to be decided by penalties and the first game at Croke Park to be so decided. It also featured a brawl ahead of the extra-time period. Galway forward Damien Comer was filmed having his eyes gouged. Referee Coldrick controversially issued red cards to Seán Kelly and Aidan Nugent, even though replays suggested they were acting as peacemakers. Government members, including Taoiseach Micheál Martin, condemned the fighting. Charles Flanagan, the former Minister for Justice, asked for a Garda investigation to be conducted. Called as "chaotic and hair-raising" by RTÉ, it overshadowed and delayed the main game of the day, between "two A-listers from the 2010s", Kerry vs Mayo.

The game was televised nationally on RTÉ2 as part of The Sunday Game live programme, presented by Joanne Cantwell from the outdoor COVID-19 pandemic-proofed studio at Croke Park, with analysis from (positioned left to right onscreen) Colm Boyle, Oisín McConville and Pat Spillane. Match commentary was provided by Darragh Maloney, assisted by Éamonn Fitzmaurice. BBC Radio's coverage included Peter Canavan, Conleith Gilligan and Mark McHugh. Des Cahill presented the highlights programme on RTÉ2 that night, with analysis from Seán Cavanagh, Colm Cooper and Ciarán Whelan.

== Pre-match ==
Galway won the 2022 Connacht Senior Football Championship, defeating Roscommon in the final. Donegal knocked Armagh out of the 2022 Ulster Senior Football Championship but gained their revenge by winning against the same team in the 2022 All-Ireland Senior Football Championship qualifier.

Armagh and Galway played each other for the fourth time in the championship and the first since 2015. Apart from the second meeting in 2013 (which took place at Pearse Stadium), all other games occurred at Croke Park. Galway won each of the previous three games. Those were: a 2001 Round 2 Qualifier (which ended Galway 0–13 Armagh 0–12), a 2013 Qualifier (which ended Galway 1–11 Armagh 0–9) and a 2015 Qualifier (which ended Galway 1–12 Armagh 0–12).

Armagh's 2002 All-Ireland Senior Football Championship Final-winning goalkeeper Benny Tierney had Armagh as the "marginal" favourite ahead of the game.

Most of the supporters who travelled to Dublin for the game were following Armagh.

== Match ==
=== First half ===
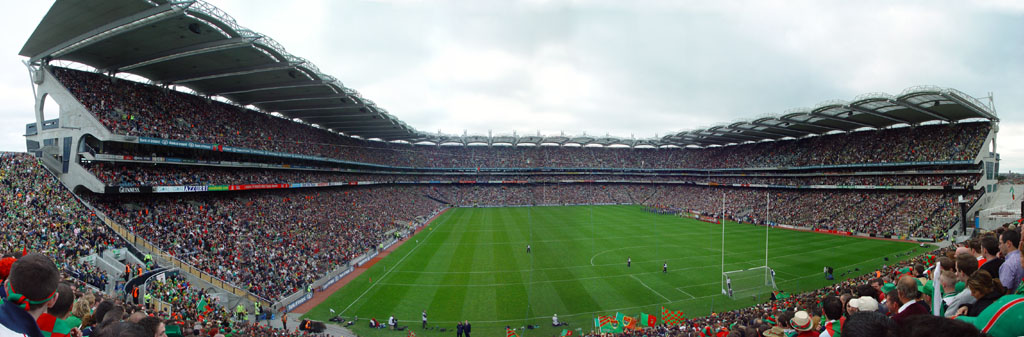
The game took place at Croke Park in Dublin

Jemar Hall was named to start the game for Armagh but Andrew Murnin actually started it and Hall appeared later as a substitute. Armagh played towards the Hill 16 end in the first half. Galway were given a free immediately from the throw-in.

On Armagh's first venture forward, Aidan Nugent sent the ball wide. Damien Comer scored the opening point of the game, for Galway, after four minutes of play. Rian O'Neill levelled the game for Armagh in the seventh minute. Then Stefan Campbell put Armagh into the lead. Rory Grugan scored Armagh's third point, followed by a fourth from Nugent.

Matthew Tierney then scored Galway's second point of the game. And Robert Finnerty their third. Jarly Óg Burns scored a fisted point for Armagh. Cillian McDaid scored Galway's fourth point of the game. Armagh then got a free, which Grugan converted, the game's first. Grugan followed it with a second free. Armagh player James Morgan pulled on the jersey of Galway forward Shane Walsh; Walsh converted the free to a score from his hands, leaving the game at Armagh 0–7 Galway 0–5. Then Walsh converted another free for Galway. Seán Kelly blocked an attempt on goal by Nugent. Tierney levelled the game by scoring for Galway after 34 minutes, the second time the two teams were even on the scoreboard. Armagh goalkeeper Ethan Rafferty ran out the field with the ball. Tierney attempted a point but it dropped short.

=== Second half ===
Galway's Finnerty scored the second half's opening point to give his team the lead for a second time. Armagh's Conor O'Neill fisted the equalising point. A shot from Tierney struck the crossbar and fell to Tierney who handpassed it to Johnny Heaney. Heaney scored the first goal of the game, for Galway. Then Walsh scored a point. Then Nugent and Campbell, for Armagh. Then Finnerty, for Galway. Then Campbell, for Armagh. Finnian Ó Laoi, on as a blood replacement, scored a point for Galway shortly after taking to the field. Galway forward Walsh was knocked again.

Rian O'Neill scored a point from a free for Armagh. Then Grugan missed another free. Armagh substitute Conor Turbitt fisted the ball onto the crossbar and it went over to leave the score at Galway 1–12 Armagh 0–13 with twelve minutes of play left.

With Galway having a two-point lead, and in the 61st minute of the game, Armagh's Greg McCabe struck with his shoulder Galway player Matthew Tierney against Tierney's head. Referee David Coldrick showed McCabe a straight red card, meaning he had to exit the game. The panel on The Sunday Game highlights programme was unanimous in its support for the decision. Tierney's head was cut open.

Armagh were six points and one man down after Greg McCabe was shown a straight red card for colliding with Galway player Matthew Tierney. Eight minutes of stoppage time were added. Armagh scored two goals in injury time. The first resulted from a ball landing in front of Aidan Nugent. Galway forward Damien Comer then scored a point which seemed to send his team through to the semi-final. However, Armagh substitute Turbitt then sent the ball into the Galway net to leave his team one point behind. Armagh received a free at a difficult angle and at distance of fifty metres from the Galway posts. Rian O'Neill stepped up and sent the ball over the bar to tie the game at 2–14 to 1–17 and also the game to extra-time.

As the teams proceeded to the tunnel a brawl began. The violence occurred at the entrance to the Cusack Stand tunnel.

=== Extra-time ===
Before extra-time got underway, referee Coldrick could be seen spending a great deal of time speaking with the other match officials.

Coldrick showed straight red cards to both captains (Armagh's Aidan Nugent and Seán Kelly of Galway), even though replays showed theirs were efforts to end the brawl. Suggestions that their roles as captains might have led to their dismissal were contradicated by the Irish Independent which said no rule exists for this — "But there may be acknowledgement that they were identified in error and that would lay out a strong case for any proposed suspension to be overturned. Both players would still have to seek a hearing but there is no video evidence to support any case for penalties against either player to stick." The Irish Times said that Coldrick "hadn't had his sharpest day at the office". However, the rulebook allowed both players to be replaced before the game resumed, meaning each team had a full complement of players for the remainder of the game.

Ahead of the 2022 All-Ireland Senior Football Championship final (where Galway met Kerry), the Irish Independent returned to the game and noted how, ahead of extra-time: "The manager passes on a message to Seán Kelly, whose immediate response is one of shock and disbelief. After a quick talk in the huddle, and several consoling pats from his team-mates, the Galway captain puts his hands to his head." Kelly, asked what Coldrick had said, responded: "At the time he was just like we were an instigator to the melee ... he had to pick someone. I got the short straw, you could say." Kelly also said that his status (and that of Nugent) as captain had not been mentioned.

=== Penalties ===
With the teams still level after extra-time the game went to penalties. It was the first time a knockout match in the All-Ireland SFC Series was decided by penalties and the first game at Croke Park to be so decided. Galway won the shootout 4–1.

Galway's Shane Walsh, Damien Comer, Robert Finnerty and Matthew Tierney each scored their penalties, with Tierney's the decisive kick after Armagh's Stefan Campbell sent his penalty wide, Rian O'Neill hit his into the net and Conor Turbitt hit his effort against the post. Galway advanced to a semi-final game against Derry, who had beaten Clare at Croke Park the previous day.

Galway manager Pádraic Joyce called it "disgraceful" that a championship match would be decided on penalties. RTÉ analyst Seán Cavanagh, speaking on The Sunday Game highlights programme, said he accepted penalties served a purpose to determine the winner of some games but that an All-Ireland quarter-final should not be decided in this way ("These aren't the skills that we typically coach our players"). Former President Liam O'Neill responded the next day: "I don't like it, but we legislated for that. People got into a room at some stage and voted for it. We have to accept that if it's in the rules, that's what happens. It's not our way of doing things. We were frogmarched into this split season — getting the championship over early — by the media and people saying we had to look after the clubs. It hasn't really worked. We were told this was the way it should be, and responded and thought it was good to go along with it. We've given away August and September to other sports. I thought we had a very good system and somehow we changed it and it hasn’t worked. We have to admit that now."

=== Details ===
26 June 2022
13:45
Quarter-final
Galway
2–21 (27) – (27) 3–18 (a.e.t.)
(4–1 pen)
Armagh
Croke Park, Dublin
Attendance: 71,353
Referee: David Coldrick (Meath)
Man of the Match: Cillian McDaid (Galway)
Shane Walsh 0–6 (0–5f), Cillian McDaid 1–2, Robert Finnerty 0–4, Johnny Heaney 1–0, Damien Comer 0–3, Matthew Tierney 0–2, Patrick Kelly 0–1, Finnian Ó Laoi 0–1, Kieran Molloy 0–1, Paul Conroy 0–1.

Penalty kicks
Shane Walsh
Damien Comer
Robert Finnerty
Matthew Tierney

Report
Rory Grugan 1–3 (0–2f), Aidan Nugent 1–2 (0–1m), Conor Turbitt 1–1, Rian O'Neill 0–4 (0–3f), Stefan Campbell 0–3, Jarly Óg Burns 0–1, Conor O'Neill 0–1, Eoin Woods 0–1, Jemar Hall 0–1, Justin Kieran 0–1.

Penalty kicks
Stefan Campbell
Rian O'Neill
Conor Turbitt

Galway	Armagh

1	Connor Gleeson
2	Liam Silke
3	Seán Kelly (c)	(red card) ET'
4	Jack Glynn
5	Dylan McHugh
6	John Daly
7	Kieran Molloy
8	Paul Conroy
9	Cillian McDaid
10	Patrick Kelly
11	Matthew Tierney
12	Johnny Heaney
13	Robert Finnerty
14	Damien Comer
15	Shane Walsh
Substitutes:
23	Finnian Ó Laoi for Seán Kelly (69 mins)
20	Niall Daly for Rob Finnerty (70+4 mins)
22	Owen Gallagher for Shane Walsh (70+9 mins)
15	Shane Walsh for Owen Gallagher (start of extra-time)
18	Billy Mannion (start of extra-time)
13	Robert Finnerty for Niall Daly (start of extra-time)
17	James Foley for Liam Silke (82 mins)
19	Cathal Sweeney for Dylan McHugh (90 mins)
Manager:
Pádraic Joyce Man of the Match: Cillian McDaid (Galway)

1	Ethan Rafferty
2	James Morgan
3	Aidan Forker
4	Conor O'Neill
5	Aaron McKay
6	Greg McCabe	(red card) 61'
7	Jarly Óg Burns
8	Stephen Sheridan
9	Ben Crealey
10	Rory Grugan
11	Stefan Campbell
12	Jemar Hall
13	Aidan Nugent (c)	(red card) ET'
14	Rian O'Neill (c)
15	Jason Duffy
Substitutes:
20	Connaire Mackin for Stephen Sheridan (43 mins)
22	Ciarán Mackin for Aaron McKay (55 mins)
23	Eoin Woods for Jason Duffy (68 mins)
25	Justin Kieran for Jarly Og Burns (68 mins)
18	Niall Rowland (start of extra-time)
7	Jarly Óg Burns for Aidan Nugent (start of extra-time)
17	Mark Shields for Aidan Forker (74 mins)
12	Jemar Hall for Rory Grugan (83 mins)
15	Jason Duffy for Ben Crealey (83 mins)
Manager:
Kieran McGeeney

== Reactions ==
Armagh manager Kieran McGeeney had a confrontation with a BBC journalist after the game.

=== Media ===
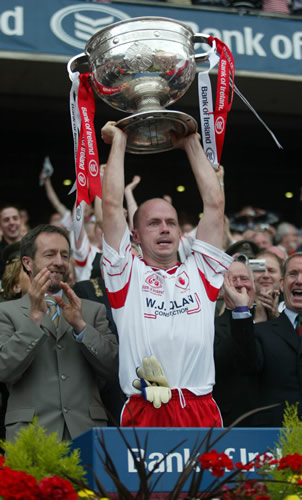
Peter Canavan

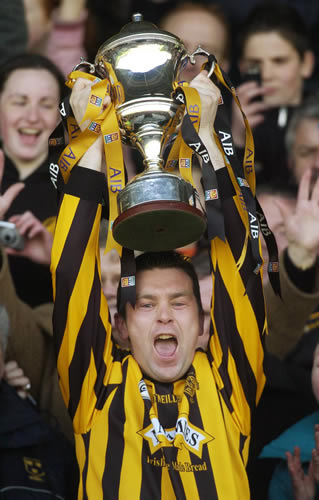
Oisín McConville

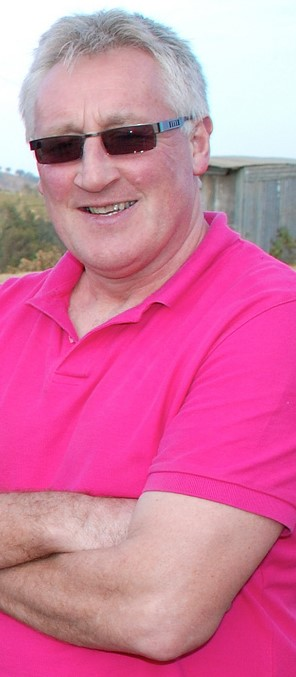
Pat Spillane

McConville and Spillane were in the RTÉ outdoor studio at Croke Park, while Canavan was covering the game for the BBC.

One of the first reactions to the scenes before the extra-time period was provided by Oisín McConville (himself a former player with Armagh), who was covering the game live as a television analyst for RTÉ. His immediate reaction was: "I think it's scenes that we shouldn't hide behind, Joanne, regardless of what county's involved. This is, like people talk about unsavoury — it's not. It's disgusting." [At this point, fellow analyst Pat Spillane interrupted: "It's disgraceful"]. McConville continued: "It's, it's, it's something that we just don't want to see, simple as that. And, I know, there's a load of clichés that we could roll out at this stage but…" Presenter Cantwell interrupted McConville as the eye gouging of Galway's Comer was replayed: "Just look closely at Damien Comer…" — "Look at Damien Comer", Spillane roared over her, his voice breaking. "It looks ver, look, we should be here praising a great game, instead we're looking at disgraceful scenes. A shame on all the players involved. But it's absolutely, I mean, there was a gouging incident. Thees is, this is terrible and it's a shame on all the players in but Jesus, Holy God, we've, we've so many rules and regulations here in Croke Park. There's a million rules and regulations and you'll send two teams running in the same spot straight after extra-time[sic]. It's crazy and, and, you have fellas who are not subs involved. So, fellas'll have to get red cards but I mean the, the, the possible eye-gouging, which looked like an eye-gouging, was done by a fella who's not on the official panel. So, you had everyone there. That was disgraceful, scandalous and shame on all involved, it was…" Cantwell tried to speak yet Spillane continued to roar, arms waving: "We should be talking about a great game of football and we had a brilliant game of football and I'd be jealous of the hurling boys, every day they're praising and they're enthusiastic and I say 'I'd love to get a game' [that matches the excitement of the Hurling Championship]", we just got the game and then they, they went and destroyed it".

Mark McHugh, covering the game for BBC Radio, said about the brawl: "The very sad thing is that after what an incredible game it was, this has destroyed it. It has ruined it." Conleith Gilligan, also on BBC Radio, said: "The big question for me will be how many players will be on the pitch when they come back on. I wouldn't say it was unprecedented but it was highly unusual".

Des Cahill presented the highlights programme on RTÉ2 that night, with analysis from Seán Cavanagh, Colm Cooper and Ciarán Whelan. The programme questioned the red cards for Nugent and Kelly, Cahill asking Whelan: "Why were they sent off?". Whelan responded: "We were struggling to understand, Des, why they were sent off… there was a lot of guys trying to be peacemakers, I think we have to recognise that as well… Aidan Nugent doesn't look to be involved in any shape or form at all, and, you can see, if anything he's trying to split it up… a lot of guys with bibs [i.e. not playing] getting much more involved and pulling guys to the ground and then, obviously, Seán Kelly gets significantly aggrieved over the Tiernan Kelly incident, but there's no evidence that he strikes anybody, or, if anything, he's trying to probably calm the situation and certainly not involved in anything that we can see". Cahill then said: "He [Kelly] reacts to the hand in the face". Whelan responded: "But he doesn't react in any aggressive way… and he's actually trying to calm the situation, and you can see he's aggrieved, he's annoyed, and why they were picked out or sent off… [voice trailing away]" Cavanagh then said: "I think the referee should have to answer those questions as well. Seán Kelly and Aidan Nugent were two of the best players on the pitch".

RTÉ analyst McConville, speaking later to the BBC, said: "I think it's right that he [Tiernan Kelly] pays as in suspension, but I also think that trial by social media is not the way to answer this, we're talking about a human being here. Show me an individual who hasn't made a mistake. It was spur of a moment and all of those things."

There were calls for Armagh to be excluded from the following year's All-Ireland. Eamonn Sweeney wrote in the Irish Independent: "The GAA shouldn't just impose a long suspension on the imbecile who gouged Damien Comer's eyes at Croke Park, they should consider doing the same thing to Armagh".

Satirical news website Waterford Whispers News (WWN) went with the headline "Hero Armagh Player Intervenes To Put Contact Lens Back In For Galway Player" above a still image of Comer's face being crushed. The website reported: "'We at the GAA just want to say this man is a hero — to see an opposition player lose a contact lens and quickly act to put it back on his eye. It must have been terrifying for Damien Comer to have blurry vision for those moments before this brave soul aggressively jammed the contact lens back onto his eye. That's the fairness and upstanding behaviour we should be known for', one GAA official said. The official also backed referee David Coldrick's decision to send off Galway's Seán Kelly for failing to come to the aid of his teammate. 'Your teammate lost his contact, we'd back the ref if he wanted to send the whole Galway team off. It's unforgivable not to be there for your teammate in his hour of need'. Sadly, the heroic moment of unparalleled courage wasn’t enough to fully take the attention away from Mayo bottling it yet again in their semi-final against Kerry." The website had also run a mixed martial arts-based story, following the first of Armagh's three brawls in 2022.

Seán Moran of The Irish Times wrote: "This most tumultuous All-Ireland quarter-final, probably ever, featured so many extraordinary elements: the first penalty shootout at such an advanced stage [and] another depressing free-for-all, as the teams came off after the end of normal time…" Colm Keys of the Irish Independent said "The stigma of the eye-gouge will follow Armagh around for some time".

=== GAA administrators ===
Former President Liam O'Neill told Morning Ireland the following day that "we're talking about violence and that is a huge pity". O'Neill said: ""We had a situation in Croke Park on Sunday where we had excellent dressing rooms on both sides of the field. We could have used one for either team and avoided this. People say it's the same around the country. It's not. In Portlaoise we have two dressing rooms and the players come out of either end of the same stand. There's never a difficulty. Admittedly it was a response to a situation that developed but we solved it and Croke Park really have to get to grips with this. There is no need for the extended panels to go into the dressing rooms at half-time. What do they contribute in there anyway? We should have people sitting in the stands and have the managers and selectors in the dressing rooms with their players. It'd be much tidier and we wouldn't have had the situation we had on Sunday."

When pressed on the lack of belief that the GAA's disciplinary system stood up to scrutiny, O'Neill responded: "That has to be admitted, that we have to tidy up our act. We should move to a situation where penalties are imposed on the day. We had that at one stage where the black card lasted for an entire game, that meant people weren't doing the sort of things they’re doing now. We have to get back to that."

Monaghan's Pat McEnaney — the retired referee and veteran of four All-Ireland SFC finals — also thought teams should be in dressing rooms at opposite sides of the stadium. He told the Today with Claire Byrne programme that a "line was crossed" during this quarter-final clash. McEnaney also stated: "Our [i.e. the GAA's] disciplinary system is broken. There is no question about that. That is not today or yesterday and that is not this past six months or year. It has been broken quite a long time… We have too many procedures, too many appeals and too many members not buying into the concept. People appeal situations where we have clear video evidence of someone striking someone — but yet we go and appeal it. There is a very simple solution. Matchday is Sunday, we do a video review and if a player can be exonerated by video evidence, he can also be found guilty by video evidence. We have that video review on a Monday night. Whatever decision is taken by that video review, everyone stands up and accepts that. No further appeals. I would make one exception — the All-Ireland final — as the one game you are allowed not to miss and you serve your suspension the following year… There's two disappointing things. Attempting to gouge is just a no-no. A Gaelic footballer will tell you a box is a decent thing in a football match, even though that is unacceptable as well. But they will tell you that. Eye-gouging and spitting are two things which there is a line. A box is decent compared to those two items… The other disappointing thing is there was a lot of subs and a lot of people who weren't directly involved in that game that got involved in a situation they shouldn't have. Full credit to the players because a lot them were seen pulling people away."

McEnaney also said: "The annoying thing for the association I'm a member of is what a classic game it was. It was all taken away from us by one silly moment. That is my overriding emotion".

McEnaney also opposed Armagh manager Kieran McGeeney's claim that the GAA was at fault for allowing the teams to exit the pitch together: "Galway were due down the tunnel first at half time. Armagh down second when the tunnel is cleared. That is an instruction… that is the protocol, there is no doubt about that. And that didn't happen. Armagh did not wait until Galway left the field. That is a protocol that would have been sent to both county boards… Armagh needs to lose their tag, and that image they have. You can be unfortunate and you can be unlucky. But it needs to stop."

=== Other GAA personalities ===
John O'Mahony described it as "unbelievable that players trying to stop [the] brawl were sent off".

Joe Bergin described Coldrick's decision to issue red cards to Kelly and Nugent as "completely bonkers".

Former Tipperary hurler Pádraic Maher described the gouging of Comer's eyes as "filth of the highest order".

Colm O'Rourke told the GAA Podcast on the day after the game that it was "just pure thuggery, and it should be called out as such… a brilliant game really marred by disgraceful scenes". He blamed the Armagh County Board because it appealed suspensions given to Armagh players for acts carried out during two previous games earlier in the season (2022 National Football League). O'Rourke said: "The common denominator unfortunately in this has been Armagh this year. This is the third incident they have been involved in. They were involved in a very big incident a few years ago at U20 level when 10 players were suspended." O'Rourke also blamed the referee: "It wasn't a good day for the officials. They allowed so much extra time. The whole thing was a shambles and I can imagine the Mayo and Kerry players and officials inside [waiting for their game that was scheduled to follow] must have been really annoyed by what was allowed to happen. The referee and his officials had about 20 minutes [after the end of normal time]. They could have gone in and looked at a television screen inside and they'd have known exactly what had happened by the time the players came back out on the field. Then we had the joke situation where two players were sent off, but both teams still had 15 players [for extra-time]. O'Rourke also dismissed such as ideas as having teams go down separate tunnels and limiting the presence of extended panels on the pitch as evading personal responsibility at the heart of the issue. O'Rourke later wrote in the Sunday Independent: "Seán Kelly acted with incredible restraint during the fracas at the end of normal time, but was put on death row for next weekend's All-Ireland semi-final. He did not deserve that and his gesture in immediately shaking hands with Aidan Nugent after both were sent off by David Coldrick said a lot about the man." O'Rourke wrote elsewhere in the same publication: "If anything, Kelly was the closest thing to Mother Teresa, as he looked more a peacemaker than a combatant and showed remarkable restraint in not flattening Tiernan Kelly".

Joe Brolly condemned Armagh (like O'Rourke, he referred to Armagh's previous that season): "They are out of control and it is only a matter of time before someone gets very seriously injured. This was deliberate goading, deliberate assaults during the course of the game, way beyond what is acceptable. I invite the GAA to look at all the camera footage. They should be asking RTÉ for all of the camera footage, because a lot was missed yesterday. It's not good enough… There is, unfortunately, a culture within this Armagh squad and it's difficult to know if it is encouraged, but it is certainly being tolerated. This is the third time this season. And the most disappointing thing about (Sunday's) game is the number of occasions when you could clearly see an Armagh player setting out to injure an opponent… The eye-gouger, no doubt, will get 12 months as a minimum… Possibly longer than that. It is a scandal to see that in our games, deeply depressing. That is the third riot on the pitch that there has been associated with [Armagh's] games and it is not a coincidence."

2010 All-Ireland SFC winner Eoin Cadogan described team captains Kelly and Nugent as "sacrificial lambs, which was unfortunate… For me, he [Seán Kelly] tried to negate it, as did Aidan Nugent. To be fair to both captains, I thought they were the peacemakers in the whole thing." He also suggested having teams use dressing rooms at opposite sides of the stadium.

Former hurling referee Brian Gavin said the game had resulted in "the most major disciplinary matter in years".

Former Tyrone All-Ireland SFC winner Owen Mulligan defended the eye-gouging incident.

=== Politicians ===
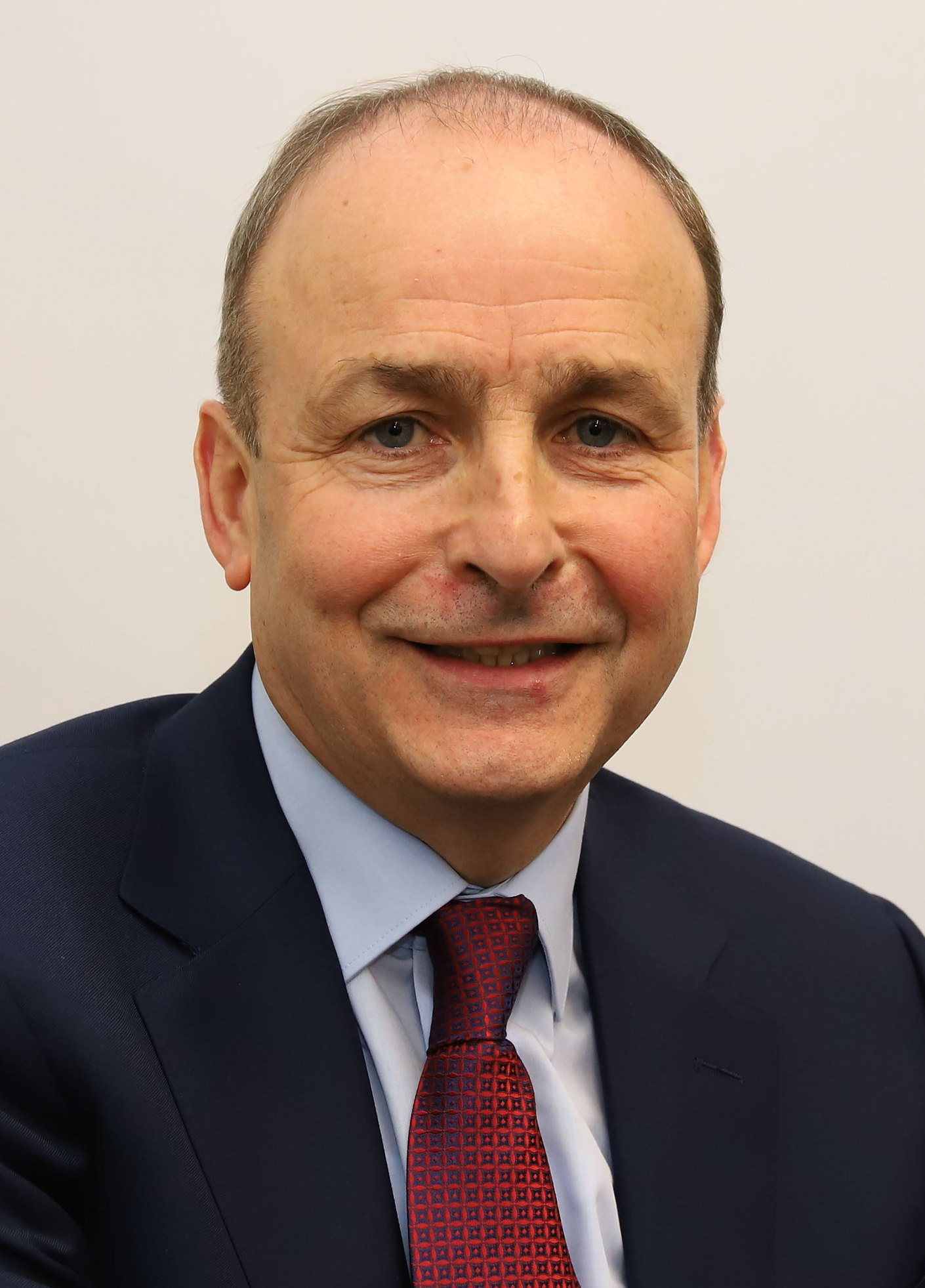
Micheál Martin

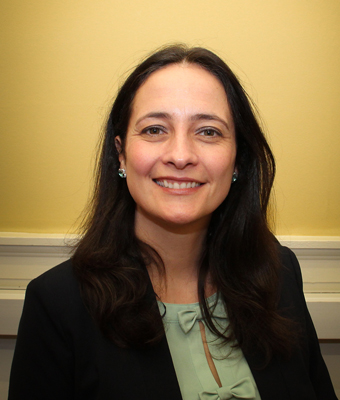
Catherine Martin

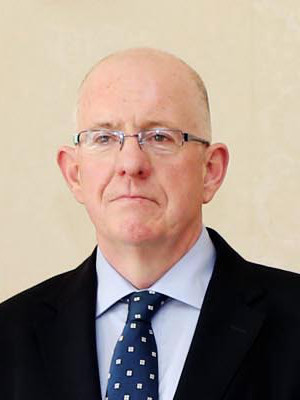
Charles Flanagan

Martin, Martin and Flanagan all condemned the scenes that occurred at Croke Park on 27 June 2022.

Taoiseach Micheál Martin condemned the scenes, describing it as "shocking", "disturbing" and "concerning".

Catherine Martin, the Minister for Tourism, Culture, Arts, Gaeltacht, Sport and Media, also condemned it, describing it as "absolutely appalling". She said: "I know of one five-year-old who was at that match yesterday as a first-time experience. They should have come home remembering what an amazing game it was; as I said, edge-of-the-seat stuff. Instead they see sports players behaving like that, and it is despicable."

Charles Flanagan, a former Minister for Justice, called for a Garda investigation into what he called a "violent confrontation". However, Gardaí confirmed on 27 June that they were not investigating the incident.

The Oireachtas Committee on Sport released a report titled "The Elimination of Abuse Directed Toward Referees, Officials and Players in Sport" on 28 June, with Fine Gael TD Alan Dillon referring to what had happened at Croke Park two days before as "ugly".

Seán Kelly, a Member of the European Parliament (MEP) and a former GAA president himself, told RTÉ Radio: "I would think that the eye-gouging incident is on a different level and is something that we do not want to see ever happening again in the GAA and I think the one way to make sure that doesn’t happen is by having a very strong deterrent and I would hope that that would be reflected in the punishment dished out to the perpetrator." "I was appalled, quite frankly, and particularly at the nature of it… the eye-gouging, which is a new low and must be really penalised really heavily. I think an idea of giving a guy [suspended for] maybe a month or two for such an incident, it should be six months or a year, maybe two years because that message has to be said very clearly, it has no place in the GAA whatsoever. I think if there is a serious violence in the case of one person physically attacking another, it has to be called for what it is, and I think that is very important to send that message out."

== Aftermath ==
Another game occurred, between Kerry and Mayo. Kerry won.

Galway midfielder Cillian McDaid was voted man of the match and Footballer of the Week on GAA.ie.

Tiernan Kelly's name circulated on social media, prompting his club Clann Éireann to release a statement defending their player: "The vilification of Tiernan on social media over the last few days has been both unjust and unfair. Tiernan has been, and always will be, a great ambassador for our club… His dedication to the GAA, both on the field and behind the scenes, has been nothing short of amazing."

David Coldrick — the referee of the Armagh–Galway game — submitted his report on 27 June, the day following the game. The GAA's Central Competitions Control Committee (CCCC) met on 28 June. According to HoganStand.com, the CCCC asked for more information from Coldrick and set 30 June as the date of its next meeting. MidWest Radio said the CCCC was seeking "clarification" on the red cards Coldrick had issued to Kelly and Nugent.

The CCCC concluded its investigation on the evening of 30 June and proposed sanctions for four players involved. Armagh's Tiernan Kelly received a 24-week ban, Blaine Hughes (who was not playing) and Conor Turbitt of Armagh and Cathal Sweeney of Galway all received one-match penalties for "behaving dangerously towards an opponent", while both counties Galway and Armagh received €10,000 fines.

== See also ==
- 2010 Leinster Senior Football Championship final, another football game at Croke Park featuring violent scenes
