= Cian O'Neill =

Irish Gaelic footballer and coach

Personal information
- Native name: Cian Ó Néill (Irish)

Sport
Inter-county management
- Years: Team
- ? 2006–2007 2008–2011 2012 2013–2015 2016–2019 2022–2024 2024–2026 2026-: Cork; Limerick (coach); Tipperary (trainer); Mayo (coach); Kerry (trainer); Kildare; Galway (coach); Kerry (coach); Cork (coach)

Dr Cian O'Neill is an Irish former Gaelic footballer who has since been a Gaelic games coach (physical trainer), selector and manager with various county teams. He has been attached to the Kerry county football team, under Jack O'Connor, from 2024 until 2026, when he left to join the Cork senior hurling team as head coach.

O'Neill trained the Tipperary county hurling team that won the 2010 All-Ireland Senior Hurling Championship. After involvement with the Mayo and Kerry county football teams, he served as manager of the Kildare county football team for several years. He then coached Galway to two All-Ireland SFC finals in 2022 and 2024, before returning to Kerry as team coach.

According to The Kerryman newspaper, O'Neill "came to national prominence in the Newbridge or Nowhere furore in 2018".

== Career ==
O'Neill is originally from Newbridge, County Kildare. He played football for Kildare GAA club Moorefield, but his career was cut short by serious back injury.

O'Neill has coached both the Tipperary county hurling team and the Kerry county football team. As well as the Mayo county football team, after Tipperary and before Kerry and while with Kerry he was also a selector. While with Kerry he was involved in the documentary All Ireland Day.

O'Neill was a member of Liam Sheedy's management team that won the 2009 Munster Senior Hurling Championship. The team also reached the 2009 All-Ireland Senior Hurling Championship final but lost to Kilkenny. O'Neill was also the Tipperary trainer when the county won the 2010 All-Ireland Senior Hurling Championship final and was runner-up in 2011. At the end of September 2011 he left the Tipperary panel after being involved for four years.

He coached the Mayo team that contested the 2012 All-Ireland Senior Football Championship final.

O'Neill later served as manager of the senior Kildare county team between 2015 and 2019. He was a lecturer at the Department of Physical Education and Sports Science in UL and in September 2013 was appointed as Head of Department of Sports, Leisure and Childhood Studies at Cork Institute of Technology.

He joined the Galway county football team as coach under the management of Pádraic Joyce ahead of the 2022 season. He then coached Galway to two All-Ireland SFC finals in 2022 and 2024, before returning to Kerry as team coach.

O'Neill has also worked with the Cork footballers.
