= Greg McCabe =

Armagh Gaelic footballer

Personal information
- Born: 1995 or 1996 (age 30–31)
- Occupation: Coach

Sport
Club
- Years: Club
- Shane O'Neill's
Inter-county
- Years: County
- Armagh

Greg McCabe is a Gaelic footballer who plays for the Shane O'Neill's club and at senior level for the Armagh county team.

He was sent off in the 2022 All-Ireland Senior Football Championship quarter-final against Galway for striking Matthew Tierney in the face. The panel on The Sunday Game highlights programme was unanimous in its support for the decision. He was also sent off that season against Tyrone in the 2022 National Football League. He had earlier scored a goal in that game.
