= Seán Kelly (Galway Gaelic footballer) =

Galway Gaelic footballer

Personal information
- Native name: Seán Ó Ceallaigh (Irish)
- Born: 12 April 1997 (age 29) Galway, Ireland
- Height: 1.88 m (6 ft 2 in)

Sport
- Sport: Gaelic football
- Position: Full Back
Club
- Years: Club
- 2015–: Moycullen
Club titles
- Galway titles: 2
College
- Years: College
- 2017–2022: NUI Galway
College titles
- Sigerson titles: 1
Inter-county
- Years: County
- 2018–: Galway
Inter-county titles
- Connacht titles: 2

Seán Kelly (born 12 April 1997) is a Gaelic footballer who plays as a defender for Moycullen and the Galway county team. He captained Galway in the 2022 All-Ireland Senior Football Championship final and was also captain for the 2024 All-Ireland Senior Football Championship final, though he was unable to start that game. John Maher replaced him as captain in 2026.

== Playing career ==
=== Club ===
Kelly scored an extra-time goal for Moycullen against Strokestown in the 2022 Connacht Senior Club Football Championship semi-final to send his team through to the final against Tourlestrane.

=== College ===
Kelly played on the NUI Galway team that lost the 2018 Sigerson Cup final. He was still on the NUI Galway team when the university won the 2022 Sigerson Cup, the only player to have featured in both games.

=== Inter-county ===
Kelly played for Galway in the 2017 All-Ireland Under-21 Football Championship final loss to Dublin.

Kevin Walsh introduced him to the senior county team in 2018. After Walsh's successor Pádraic Joyce took over as manager, Kelly was injured in the first half of the 2021 Connacht Senior Football Championship final defeat to Mayo and was a loss for his team. Joyce appointed Kelly as captain of the Galway team for 2022, with Matthew Tierney as vice-captain.

In the 2022 All-Ireland quarter-final between Armagh and Galway at Croke Park, he — along with Armagh joint captain Aidan Nugent — was controversially shown a straight red card following a brawl before extra-time. Television cameras could not detect any involvement by Kelly in the violence, apart from annoyance and efforts to point out that Armagh's Tiernan Kelly had attempted to gouge the eyes of Kelly's teammate Damien Comer. Kelly was later described as a "sacrificial lamb". Kelly would have missed the semi-final against Derry had referee David Coldrick's decision stood. But it was set to be overturned in the absence of any wrongdoing on Kelly's part. Colm O'Rourke later wrote in the Sunday Independent: "Seán Kelly acted with incredible restraint during the fracas at the end of normal time, but was put on death row for next weekend's All-Ireland semi-final. He did not deserve that and his gesture in immediately shaking hands with Aidan Nugent after both were sent off by David Coldrick said a lot about the man." O'Rourke wrote elsewhere in the same publication: "If anything, Kelly was the closest thing to Mother Teresa, as he looked more a peacemaker than a combatant and showed remarkable restraint in not flattening Tiernan Kelly [who had just gouged the eyes of Damien Comer]".

But, troubled by injury, Kelly began to be displaced as Galway full-back by Seán Fitzgerald. The back ground to this began as early as 2022, Fitzgerald's first year on the senior team. With the 2022 National League done and dusted, Fitzgerald made a belated blood sub appearance in place of Kelly against Derry. Fitzgerald went onto start in the half-back line in the league final loss to Roscommon. He moved to the full-back line as a corner-back alongside regular full-back Kelly for the 2023 National League games against Armagh and Kerry as Galway qualified for the Division 1 League final. Galway lost to Mayo, with Fitzgerald playing the entire game as full-back, swapping with Kelly who went too corner-back.

Fitzgerald went on to become the senior team's starting full-back, gradually ousting Kelly from the team in the process. Fitzgerald played this role in the opening 2024 National League game against Mayo; with Kelly absent, Fitzgerald was given a torrid time by opponent Aidan O'Shea. Kelly made a first appearance of the season as a substitute in the league game against Tyrone. But injury was a problem; he was a second half sub against Derry, started further forward and scored a point against Monaghan, then was absent for the league game against Dublin.

Namd in the starting line-up for the 2024 All-Ireland Senior Football Championship final, Kelly was unable to start, with Cein Darcy replacing him in a late change, just before the game began.

John Maher replaced him as captain in 2026.

== Personal life ==
Kelly's father, Padraig "Dandy" Kelly, was a substitute for Galway in the 1983 All-Ireland Senior Football Championship final defeat to Dublin. He died in 2001 at the age of 40.

== Honours ==
Moycullen

- Galway Senior Football Championship (2): 2020, 2022

Galway

- Connacht Senior Football Championship (2): 2018, 2022

NUI Galway

- Sigerson Cup: 2022

Preceded by Shane Walsh	Galway Senior Football Captain; 2022–2026	Succeeded by John Maher
