= Weeshie Fogarty =

Irish Gaelic footballer, referee, and sports broadcaster (1941–2018)

Aloysius Weeshie Fogarty
- Alabhaois Ó Fógartaigh
- Born: March 1941; Cork, Ireland
- Died: 18 November 2018 (aged 77); Kerry, Ireland
- Other name: Weeshie
- Occupation: Broadcaster・Psychiatric Nurse・Referee
- Spouse: Joan Fogarty (m. 1969)
- Gaelic games career
- Sport: Gaelic football
- Position: Goalkeeper
Clubs
- Years: Club
- Killarney Legion; East Kerry
Club titles
- Kerry titles: 4
- Munster titles: 2
- All-Ireland Titles: 1
Inter-county
| Years | County | Apps (scores) |
| 1969–1971 | Kerry | 0 (0-00) |
Inter-county titles
- Munster titles: 1
- All-Irelands: 1

Aloysius "Weeshie" Fogarty (March 1941 – 18 November 2018) was an Irish Gaelic footballer, referee and sports broadcaster. His league and championship career with the Kerry senior team lasted three seasons from 1969 to 1971.

== Biography ==
"Weeshie" Fogarty was born in Cork in March 1941 to parents Richard and Kathleen Fogarty. He joined the Killarney Legion GAA club in February 1955 at the age of fourteen and went on to win several divisional senior championship medals with the club.

Fogarty made his debut on the inter-county scene at the age of seventeen when he was selected for the Kerry minor team in 1959. He enjoyed one championship season with the minor team, however, he was a Munster runner-up. Fogarty subsequently joined the Kerry under-21 team, winning a Munster medal in 1962. In 1965, Fogarty qualified as a psychiatric nurse and found employment in St. Finan's Psychiatric Hospital, working there for 38 years until 2003. The death of his father Richard at the age of 62 following a heart attack, stroke and prostate cancer deeply affected Fogarty, who stated in his autobiography that "the memory of his suffering remains vivid to me".

As a member of the Kerry junior team, Fogarty won an All-Ireland medal in 1967. He later joined the Kerry senior team when he was added to the panel for the 1969 championship. Over the course of the next few seasons, he won one All-Ireland medal as a non-playing substitute in 1969. He also won one Munster medal. Fogarty played his last game for Kerry in October 1970 after a serious eye injury ended his inter-county career. With the divisional East Kerry team he won an All-Ireland medal as a non-playing substitute in 1971. Fogarty also won two Munster medals and four county senior championship medals.

Following his retirement from football, Fogarty served as a referee. He oversaw All-Ireland football semi-finals from 1981 to 1983, and was the first referee in the history of the GAA to deploy a yellow card.

From 1998, Fogarty worked as a sports broadcaster. He worked for Radio Kerry where he hosted his own show called Terrace Talk on Monday evenings, while he also wrote for The Kerryman newspaper. Fogarty's autobiography, My Beautiful Obession: Chasing the Kerry Dream, was published in November 2012.

In 2015, he was involved in the documentary All Ireland Day.

On 18 November 2018, Fogarty died at the age of 77.

On 28 April 2022, a roundabout at the junction between Dalton's Avenue and Marian Terrace in Killarney was named after Fogarty.
