= Aidan Nugent =

Armagh Gaelic footballer

Sport
Club
- Years: Club
- Cullyhanna
Inter-county
- Years: County
- 2019–2024: Armagh
Inter-county titles
- All-Irelands: 1

Aidan Nugent is a Gaelic footballer who formerly played at senior level for the Armagh county team and was the Armagh captain in 2022. He scored a goal in the 2022 All-Ireland quarter-final between Armagh and Galway at Croke Park. Along with Galway captain Seán Kelly he was controversially issued a straight red card following a brawl before extra-time.

In December 2024, the PSNI began investigating an "incident" which was alleged to have taken place in November during a trip to Miami, Florida, by members of the Armagh All-Ireland champions. A 30-year-old man was subsequently arrested and charged with two counts of sexual assault and two of causing a person to engage in a sexual act without consent. In May 2025, Nugent was named as the man charged with the four sexual offences.
