= All Ireland Day =

Irish documentary

- Genre: Documentary
- Starring: David Coldrick; Cian O'Neill; Weeshie Fogarty
- Country of origin: Ireland

Production
- Production company: Loosehorse

Original release
- Network: RTÉ One
- Release: 9 November 2015

All Ireland Day (which some sources refer to as All-Ireland Day) is a documentary about the 2015 All-Ireland Senior Football Championship Final.

It first aired on RTÉ One on 9 November 2015. Loosehorse were responsible for putting it together.

Referee David Coldrick, Kerry selector Cian O'Neill and Radio Kerry commentator Weeshie Fogarty all featured.

The Gaelic Players Association afterwards reported that several players involved in the game had contacted it after first learning while watching the documentary that their words with referee Coldrick on the day were being aired to a national audience. A few days after it was aired, Kerry player Colm Cooper publicly criticised the decision not to inform the players.

Kerry player Kieran Donaghy was filmed telling Coldrick that Dublin player Philly McMahon had gouged him in the eyes. The incident had been downplayed at the time of the game, many weeks earlier, including by both Donaghy and McMahon.
