= Conor Turbitt =

Armagh Gaelic footballer (born 1999)

Personal information
- Native name: Conchubhar Torbóid (Irish)
- Nickname: Turbo
- Born: 1999 (age 26–27) Lurgan, Northern Ireland
- Height: 6’3

Sport
- Sport: Gaelic Football
- Position: Left Corner Forward
Club
- Years: Club
- 2016–: Clann Éireann
Club titles
- Armagh titles: 2
Inter-county
- Years: County
- 2020–: Armagh
Inter-county titles
- All-Irelands: 1
- All Stars: 1

Conor Turbitt (born 1999) is a Gaelic footballer who plays for the Clann Éireann club and at senior level for the Armagh county team. He is a forward.

He was given a one-match penalty for "behaving dangerously towards an opponent" during the 2022 All-Ireland SFC quarter-final against Galway. His father Brian is a native of Tyrone.

He won an All Star at the end of the 2024 season.

== Honours ==
Armagh

- All-Ireland Senior Football Championship (1): 2024

Individual

- All Star (1): 2024
