= Paddy Tally =

Gaelic football manager and coach

Paddy Tally (born 1970s) is a Gaelic football manager and coach.

A member of the Galbally Pearses club, Tally was a squad member when Tyrone played in the 1995 All-Ireland Senior Football Championship Final. He was Tyrone coach when that team won the 2003 All-Ireland Senior Football Championship. Tally left Tyrone at the end of the 2004 season. His role never prescribed any involvement in picking the team."

Tally was part of Down's backroom team when that county reached the 2010 All-Ireland Senior Football Championship final. He won an unexpected Sigerson Cup as manager of the St Mary's University College, Belfast team in 2017. Under the management of Kevin Walsh, he coached the Galway county team in 2018 when that county reached the "Super 8s". He left Galway when a managerial vacancy arose after Éamonn Burns left his role as Down senior manager.

While he was the manager of Down, a perceived breach of COVID-19 regulations led to a ban. Down lost all their home 2022 National Football League games as punishment. Tally's ban was later reduced. Although Down approved a one-year extension, Tally did not think Down's clubs' vote on the issue was large enough to give him the confidence to stay as manager.

Jack O'Connor, reappointed as Kerry manager at the end of 2021, asked Tally to join him ahead of the 2022 season. Tally was head coach of the team that won the 2022 All-Ireland Senior Football Championship Final. Ahead of that game (when it turned out he shared a club with referee Sean Hurson), Galway manager Pádraic Joyce was asked to comment on this, as was Kerry manager Jack O'Connor.

He was appointed as manager for Derry county football team for the 2025 season.

Paddy is currently part of the Mayo coaching team for 2026 along with manager Andy Moran and other coach Colm Boyle.

Preceded by Éamonn Burns	Down Senior Football Manager; 2018–2021	Succeeded by James McCartan Jnr
