= Keith Begley =

Irish sports psychologist and Gaelic football manager

Keith Begley is an Irish sports psychologist and Gaelic football manager. He has worked with the Carlow senior hurling team, the Clare senior football team and Cuala's senior hurlers. He has also led the Offaly minor football team.

An accredited sports psychologist with the Sport Ireland Institute and a former physical education teacher, he is often referenced in the national media.
