= Johnny Heaney =

Galway Gaelic footballer

Johnny Heaney is a Gaelic footballer who plays for Killannin and the Galway county team. His usual position is as a half-forward.

His father comes from Mayo. He scored a goal against Mayo at MacHale Park, towards the end of the 2018 Connacht Senior Football Championship quarter-final. It was his fourth year of involvement with the Galway team, having made his championship debut in 2016.

He scored a goal against Armagh in the quarter-final of the 2022 All-Ireland Senior Football Championship.

== Career statistics ==
As of match played 24 July 2022

| Team | Year | National League | | | Connacht | | All-Ireland | | Total | |
| Team | Year | Division | Apps | Score | Apps | Score | Apps | Score | Apps | Score |
|---|---|---|---|---|---|---|---|---|---|---|
| Galway | 2016 | Division 1 | | | 3 | 0-02 | 1 | 0-00 | 4 | 0-02 |
| Galway | 2017 | Division 1 | | | 2 | 0-01 | 2 | 2-03 | 4 | 2-04 |
| Galway | 2018 | Division 1 | | | 3 | 1-02 | 4 | 0-02 | 7 | 1-04 |
| Galway | 2019 | Division 1 | | | 3 | 1-01 | 1 | 0-00 | 4 | 1-01 |
| Galway | 2020 | Division 1 | | | 1 | 0-00 | - | | 1 | 0-00 |
| Galway | 2021 | Division 1 | | | 2 | 0-00 | - | | 2 | 0-00 |
| Galway | 2022 | Division 1 | | | 3 | 1-04 | 3 | 1-02 | 6 | 2-06 |
| Career total | | | | | 17 | 3-10 | 11 | 3-07 | 28 | 6-17 |
