= Rian O'Neill =

Armagh Gaelic footballer (born 1998)

Personal information
- Born: 1998 (age 27–28)

Sport
- Sport: Gaelic Football
- Position: Centre Forward
Club
- Years: Club
- 2016–: Crossmaglen
Club titles
- Armagh titles: 4
Inter-county
- Years: County
- 2019–: Armagh
Inter-county titles
- All-Irelands: 1

Rian O'Neill (born 1998) is a Gaelic footballer who plays for the Crossmaglen club and at senior level for the Armagh county team. He plays as a forward. He has shared the Armagh captaincy role with Aidan Nugent.

O'Neill was man of the match against Kerry in the 2024 All-Ireland Senior Football Championship Semi-Final, when his team made it through to a first final for 21 years.

He was nominated for an All Star in 2022, but he didn't win. He won an All Star at the end of the 2024 season.

His brother Oisín plays alongside him for Armagh and Crossmaglen.

== Honours ==
Armagh

- All-Ireland Senior Football Championship (1): 2024

Individual

- All Star (1): 2024
