= John Maher (Gaelic footballer) =

Galway Gaelic footballer

Personal information
- Native name: Seán Ó Meachair (Irish)
- Born: 5 November 1998 (age 27) Galway, Ireland
- Occupation: Engineer
- Height: 1.93 m (6 ft 4 in)

Sport
- Sport: Gaelic football
- Position: Midfield
Club
- Years: Club
- 2016–: Salthill–Knocknacarra
College
- Years: College
- NUI Galway
Inter-county
- Years: County
- 2018–: Galway
Inter-county titles
- Connacht titles: 3
- All Stars: 1

John Maher (born 5 November 1998) is a Gaelic footballer who plays for the Galway county team, and club football for Salthill–Knocknacarra.

== Playing career ==
Maher made his inter-county debut during the 2018 FBD League, but didn't feature in any subsequent National League or Championship campaign until the COVID-hit 2020 National League season against Mayo. He was substituted at half time and would not appear for the county team again until the 2023 FBD League.

His championship debut came against Roscommon in the 2023 Connacht SFC on 23 April, where he scored two points.

Maher missed the first two games of Galway's 2024 Connacht SFC campaign due to injury but he returned for the Connacht SFC final win against Mayo, replacing Kieran Molloy.

The 2024 All-Ireland SFC final was Maher's first appearance in the decider, with Galway losing that game to Armagh.

Maher was nominated for the 2024 PwC GAA/GPA Footballer of the Year, but lost to fellow Galway player Paul Conroy. He was named at centre half-forward in the 2024 All-Star team.

He replaced Seán Kelly as captain in 2026.

Preceded by Seán Kelly	Galway Senior Football Captain; 2026–	Incumbent
