= 2022 All-Ireland Senior Football Championship =

Championship details
- Dates: 16 April – 24 July 2022
- Teams: 33

All-Ireland Champions
- Winning team: Kerry (38th win)
- Captain: Seán O'Shea
- Manager: Jack O'Connor

All-Ireland Finalists
- Losing team: Galway
- Captain: Seán Kelly
- Manager: Pádraic Joyce

Provincial Champions
- Munster: Kerry
- Leinster: Dublin
- Ulster: Derry
- Connacht: Galway

Championship statistics
- Top Scorer: Shane Walsh (1–36)
- Player of the Year: David Clifford

The 2022 All-Ireland Senior Football Championship (SFC) was the 136th edition of the Gaelic Athletic Association's premier inter-county Gaelic football tournament since its establishment in 1887.

Tyrone entered the competition as the defending champion, but lost to Derry in the Ulster Championship before being eliminated by Armagh in the All-Ireland Qualifiers.

Thirty three teams took part: all thirty two Irish counties except Kilkenny were joined by London and New York, both of whom were back in the competition for the first time since 2019, an absence caused by public health restrictions imposed by the COVID-19 pandemic.

This year, the championship split into a two-tier system for the first time, with the Tailteann Cup being the second-tier competition for those teams that did not qualify for the tier 1 Sam Maguire Cup competition. To qualify for the Sam Maguire competition, a county team needed to (a) reach their provincial final or (b) finish in Division 1 or 2 (after promotion and relegation were determined in the 2022 National Football League). This system was planned to only be used for the 2022 season, with it moving to exactly sixteen teams continuing in the Sam Maguire competition from 2023 onwards.

The draws for the provincial championships took place on 27 November 2021.

The final was played on 24 July 2022 at Croke Park in Dublin, between Galway and Kerry. Kerry won their 38th title after a 0–20 to 0–16 win against Galway.

== Format ==
=== Provincial Championships format ===
Connacht, Leinster, Munster and Ulster each organise a provincial championship. All teams who lose a match in their provincial championship progress to either the All-Ireland qualifiers (tier 1) or the Tailteann Cup (tier 2). All provincial matches are knock-out.

=== Qualifiers format ===
All counties in the competition play in their provincial championships. However, only the counties in National Football League Division 1 and Division 2 play in the All-Ireland Championship qualifiers after losing a game in their provincial championships. The counties in National Football League Division 3 and Division 4 (as they stand when the 2022 league concludes after the resulting promotion and relegation changes have been applied) do not progress into the All-Ireland series and instead enter the second-tier Tailteann Cup once they are knocked out of their provincial championship. The only exception to this is that all eight provincial finalists progress, regardless of their league division; the four provincial champions progress to the All-Ireland quarter-finals, while the four beaten provincial finalists will play off against the best four teams from the Qualifiers for a place in the quarter-finals.

Division 1 and 2 teams who are knocked out of their province without reaching the provincial final play off in the Qualifiers, on a straight knock-out basis. The four survivors play off with the four beaten provincial championship finalists, in a final qualifier round to complete the double-elimination format. The four winners of this final qualifier round join the four provincial champions in the All-Ireland quarter-finals.

=== All-Ireland format ===
The four provincial champions play the four winners of the final round of the qualifiers in the quarter-finals. Two semi-finals and a final follow. All matches are knock-out.

== Teams ==
=== General Information ===
Thirty three counties will compete in the All-Ireland Senior Football Championship: seven teams in the Connacht Senior Football Championship, eleven teams in the Leinster Senior Football Championship, six teams in the Munster Senior Football Championship and nine teams in the Ulster Senior Football Championship.

County	Last Provincial Title	Last Championship Title	Position in 2021 Championship	Current Championship
Antrim	1951	—		Ulster Senior Football Championship
Armagh	2008	2002		Ulster Senior Football Championship
Carlow	1944	—		Leinster Senior Football Championship
Cavan	2020	1952		Ulster Senior Football Championship
Clare	1992	—		Munster Senior Football Championship
Cork	2012	2010		Munster Senior Football Championship
Derry	1998	1993		Ulster Senior Football Championship
Donegal	2019	2012		Ulster Senior Football Championship
Down	1994	1994		Ulster Senior Football Championship
Dublin	2021	2020		Leinster Senior Football Championship
Fermanagh	—	—		Ulster Senior Football Championship
Galway	2018	2001		Connacht Senior Football Championship
Kerry	2021	2014		Munster Senior Football Championship
Kildare	2000	1928		Leinster Senior Football Championship
Laois	2003	—		Leinster Senior Football Championship
Leitrim	1994	—		Connacht Senior Football Championship
Limerick	1896	1896		Munster Senior Football Championship
London	—	—		Connacht Senior Football Championship
Longford	1968	—		Leinster Senior Football Championship
Louth	1957	1957		Leinster Senior Football Championship
Mayo	2021	1951		Connacht Senior Football Championship
Meath	2010	1999		Leinster Senior Football Championship
Monaghan	2015	—		Ulster Senior Football Championship
New York	—	—		Connacht Senior Football Championship
Offaly	1997	1982		Leinster Senior Football Championship
Roscommon	2019	1944		Connacht Senior Football Championship
Sligo	2007	—		Connacht Senior Football Championship
Tipperary	2020	1920		Munster Senior Football Championship
Tyrone	2021	2021		Ulster Senior Football Championship
Waterford	1898	—		Munster Senior Football Championship
Westmeath	2004	—		Leinster Senior Football Championship
Wexford	1945	1918		Leinster Senior Football Championship
Wicklow	—	—		Leinster Senior Football Championship

=== Team allocation ===
All-Ireland Senior Football Championship
Entry Round	Counties			
All-Ireland Quarter-finals	Kerry (1st)	Dublin (1st)	Galway (1st)	Derry (1st)
Qualifiers Round 2	Limerick (2nd)	Kildare (2nd)	Roscommon (2nd)	Donegal (2nd)
Qualifiers Round 1	Armagh	Cork	Mayo	Monaghan
Qualifiers Round 1	Clare	Louth	Tyrone	Meath
Tailteann Cup
Entry Round	Counties			
Quarter-finals	New York			
First round	Antrim	Down	Leitrim	Sligo
First round	Carlow	Fermanagh	London	Tipperary
First round	Cavan	Laois	Longford	Westmeath
Preliminary round	Offaly	Waterford	Wexford	Wicklow

== Provincial championships ==
=== Connacht Senior Football Championship ===
London and New York were withdrawn from the 2020 and 2021 Connacht championships due to international travel restrictions imposed due to the COVID-19 pandemic, but both are back in the 2022 season.

Quarter-finals
Mayo	0–16
Galway	1–14
London	2–11
Leitrim	3–12
New York	0–15
Sligo	1–16

Semi-finals
Galway	4–20
Leitrim	0–09
Sligo	0–11
Roscommon	0–23

Final
Galway	2–19
Roscommon	2–16

29 May 2022 Connacht Final	Galway	2–19 – 2–16	Roscommon	Pearse Stadium, Galway
		Report		Attendance: 21,419; Referee: Joe McQuillan (Cavan)

The winning finalist advanced to the All-Ireland SFC quarter-finals, while the losing finalist advanced to the All-Ireland SFC qualifiers.

=== Leinster Senior Football Championship ===
Preliminary round 24 April
Louth	5-10
Carlow	0-10
Wexford	1-15
Offaly	1-12
Wicklow	5-15
Laois	4-12

Quarter-finals; 30 April / 1 May
Louth	0-12
Kildare	2-22
Westmeath	3-13
Longford	0-14
Wexford	0-04
Dublin	1-24
Meath	4-13
Wicklow	1-12

Semi-finals; 15 May
Kildare	1-21
Westmeath	2-15
Dublin	1-27
Meath	1-14

Final; 29 May
Kildare	1-15
Dublin	5-17

28 May 2022 Leinster Final	Dublin	5–17 – 1–15	Kildare	Croke Park, Dublin
	Con O'Callaghan 1–5 (0-1m), Cormac Costello 2–1, Dean Rock 0-4f, John Small and Ciaran Kilkenny 1–0 each, Brian Fenton 0–3, Lee Gannon 0–2, Niall Scully and Aaron Byrne 0–1 each	Report	Jimmy Hyland 1–4 (0-3f), Ben McCormack 0–5 (0-1m), Kevin Feely 0–2 (0-1m), Kevin Flynn, Paul Cribbin, Darragh Kirwan, Paddy Woodgate (0-1f) 0–1 each	Attendance: 33,328; Referee: Paddy Neilan (Roscommon); Man of the Match: Con O'Callaghan (Cuala)

The winning finalist advanced to the All-Ireland SFC quarter-finals, while the losing finalist advanced to the All-Ireland SFC qualifiers.

=== Munster Senior Football Championship ===
Quarter-finals; 30 April
Waterford	1-08
Tipperary	2-13
Clare	1-19
Limerick	2-16 (p)

Semi-finals; 7/14 May
Cork	0-11
Kerry	0-23
Tipperary	0-10
Limerick	2-10

Final; 28 May
Kerry	1-28
Limerick	0-8

28 May 2022 Munster Final	Kerry	1–28 – 0–08	Limerick	Fitzgerald Stadium, Killarney
		Report		Attendance: 14,587; Referee: Martin McNally (Monaghan)

The winning finalist advanced to the All-Ireland SFC quarter-finals, while the losing finalist advanced to the All-Ireland SFC qualifiers.

=== Ulster Senior Football Championship ===
Preliminary round 16 April
Fermanagh	2–10
Tyrone	2–17

Quarter-finals; 23/24/30 April, 1 May
Donegal	1–16
Armagh	0–12
Antrim	0–10
Cavan	1–20
Monaghan	0–23
Down	2–7
Tyrone	0–10
Derry	1–18

Semi-finals; 8/15 May
Donegal	2–16
Cavan	0–16
Derry	3–12
Monaghan	0–17

Final; 29 May
Donegal	1–14
Derry	1–16

29 May 2022 Ulster Final	Donegal	1–14 – 1–16 (a.e.t.)	Derry	St Tiernach's Park, Clones
		Report		Referee: Sean Hurson (Tyrone)

The winning finalist advanced to the All-Ireland SFC quarter-finals, while the losing finalist advanced to the All-Ireland SFC qualifiers.

== Qualifiers ==
=== Round 1 ===
4 June 2022 Round 1	Mayo	1–13 – 0–12	Monaghan	McHale Park, Castlebar
	Cillian O’Connor (1–6, 5f), Lee Keegan (0–1), Patrick Durcan (0–1), Eoghan McLaughlin (0–1), Matthew Ruane (0–1), Jack Carney (0–1), Darren McHale (0–1), Robbie Hennelly (0–1)	Report	Jack McCarron (0–3, 1m), Gary Mohan (0–2), Shane Carey (0–2. 2f), Conor McManus (0–1, 1f), Kieran Duffy (0–1), Conor McCarthy (0–1), Conor Leonard (0–1), Micheal Brannigan (0–1)	Attendance: 16,377; Referee: Barry Cassidy (Derry)

4 June 2022 Round 1	Clare	1–11 – 1–09	Meath	Cusack Park, Ennis
	E Cleary (0-04 1f), P Lillis (1-00), E McMahon (0-02), D O’Neill (0-01), J Malone (0-01), D Tubridy (0-01 1f), K Sexton (0-01 1’45), M Doherty (0-01)	Report	C McGill (1-00 1’Pen), C O’Sullivan (0-02 1f), T O’Reilly (0-01), M Costello (0-01), J O’Connor (0-01 1f), J Scully (0-01), E Harkin (0-01), D McGowan (0-01), B McMahon (0-01 1f)	Attendance: 2,460; Referee: Brendan Cawley (Kildare)

4 June 2022 Round 1	Cork	2–12 – 2–08	Louth	Páirc Uí Chaoimh, Cork
	S Sherlock (0–8, 0–6 frees); B Hurley (1–4, 0–1 mark); C O’Callaghan (1–0).	Report	L Jackson (1–1); S Mulroy (0–4, 0–4 frees); C Grimes (1–0); D Corcoran, C Downey, T Jackson (0–1 each).	Referee: Fergal Kelly (Longford)

5 June 2022 Round 1	Armagh	1–16 – 1–10	Tyrone	Athletic Grounds, Armagh
	A Nugent (1–1), R O’Neill (0–4, 3f), E Rafferty, S Campbell, A Murnin (0–2 each), C O’Neill, S Sheridan, R Grugan, J Duffy, C Turbitt (0–1 each)	Report	D McCurry (0–7, 4f, 1 mark), C McKenna (1–0), P Harte, C Kilpatrick, R Donnelly (0–1 each)	Attendance: 16,292; Referee: David Coldrick (Meath)

=== Round 2 ===
The four beaten provincial finalists played the four round 1 winners.

11 June 2022 Round 2	Roscommon	1–17 – 2–15	Clare	Croke Park, Dublin
	Diarmuid Murtagh 1–2 (0-2f), Ciaráin Murtagh 0–5 (0-1f), Ronan Daly 0–2, Donie Smith 0–2 (0-1f), Cian McKeon 0–1, Conor Cox 0-1f, Niall Kilroy 0–1, Conor Daly 0–1, Richard Hughes 0–1, Keith Doyle 0–1.	Report	Keelan Sexton 2–6 (1–0 pen, 0-5f), Emmet McMahon 0–2, Cathal O’Connor 0–2, Eoin Cleary 0-2f, Pádraic Collins 0–1, Cillian Rouine 0–1, Jamie Malone 0–1	Attendance: 16,425

11 June 2022 Round 2	Kildare	0–14 – 2–13	Mayo	Croke Park, Dublin
	Jimmy Hyland 0–6 (0-5f), Kevin O’Callaghan 0–2, Darragh Malone 0–1, Kevin Feely 0–1, Ben McCormack 0–1, Daniel Flynn 0–1, Neil Flynn 0–1, Shea Ryan 0–1.	Report	Cillian O‘Connor 0–3 (0-1f), Oisín Mullin 1–0, Jordan Flynn 1–0, Eoghan McLaughlin 0–2, Lee Keegan 0–2, Fergal Boland 0–2, Jack Carney 0–1, Diarmuid O’Connor 0–1, Conor Loftus 0–1, Darren McHale 0–1.	Attendance: 16,425; Referee: Derek O'Mahoney (Tipperary)

12 June 2022 Round 2	Limerick	1–16 – 2–18	Cork	Páirc Uí Chaoimh, Cork
	Hugh Bourke 0–5 (0-4f), Adrian Enright 0–4, Brian Donovan 1–0, Josh Ryan 0–2, Gordon Brown 0–2, Cian Sheehan 0–1, Robbie Burke 0–1, James Naughton 0–1.	Report	Steven Sherlock 0–8 (0-5f, 0–1 ’45), Brian Hurley 1–2 (1–0 pen), Cathail O’Mahony 1–0, John O’Rourke 0–3, Eoghan McSweeney 0–2, Kevin O’Donovan 0–1, Colm O’Callaghan 0–1, Damien Gore 0–1.	Referee: Jerome Henry (Mayo)

12 June 2022 Round 2	Donegal	0–16 – 3–17	Armagh	St Tiernach's Park, Clones
	M Murphy (0–6, 0–5 frees), S O’Donnell (0–4), A Doherty, R McHugh, J McGee, C Thompson, P McBrearty, N O’Donnell (0–1 each)	Report	R O’Neill (1–7, 1–0 Pen, 2 frees, 1x’45), R Grugan (1–3, 1 free), J Óg Burns (0–3), S Sheridan (1–0), C Turbitt (0–2), S Campbell, J Duffy (0–1 each)	Referee: Brendan Cawley (Kildare)

== Quarter-finals ==
The four provincial champions played the four winners of the qualifiers round 2.

25 June 2022; 15:45; Quarter-final	Derry	5–13 (28) – (14) 2–08	Clare	Croke Park, Dublin; Attendance: 50,874; Referee: Martin McNally (Monaghan)
25 June 2022; 15:45; Quarter-final	Shane McGuigan 1–8 (0-1f), Conor Glass 1–1, Benny Heron 1–1, Paul Cassidy 1–1, Gareth McKinless 1–0, Niall Loughlin 0–1 (0-1f), Conor McCluskey 0–1.	Report	Eoin Cleary 1–5 (0-2f), Pearse Lillis 1–0, David Tubridy 0–2, (0-2f), Jamie Malone 0–1.	Croke Park, Dublin; Attendance: 50,874; Referee: Martin McNally (Monaghan)

25 June 2022; 18:00; Quarter-final	Dublin	0–21 – 0–10	Cork	Croke Park, Dublin; Attendance: 50,874; Referee: Sean Hurson (Tyrone)
25 June 2022; 18:00; Quarter-final	Dean Rock 0–9 (0–8 f, 0–1 mark), Ciaran Kilkenny 0–3, Brian Fenton, Lee Gannon 0–2 each, Cormac Costello, Sean Bugler, Paddy Small, Tom Lahiff, Aaron Byrne 0–1 each.	Report	Steven Sherlock 0–3 (0–2 f), Cathal O’Mahony 0–3 (0–1 f, 0–1 mark), Brian Hurley 0–2, Eoghan McSweeney, John O’Rourke 0–1 each	Croke Park, Dublin; Attendance: 50,874; Referee: Sean Hurson (Tyrone)

26 June 2022
13:45
Quarter-final
Galway
2–21 (27) – (27) 3–18 (a.e.t.)
(4–1 pen)
Armagh
Croke Park, Dublin
Attendance: 71,353
Referee: David Coldrick (Meath)
Man of the Match: Cillian McDaid
Shane Walsh 0–6 (0-5f), Cillian McDaid 1–2, Robert Finnerty 0–4, Johnny Heaney 1–0, Damien Comer 0–3, Matthew Tierney 0–2, Patrick Kelly 0–1, Finnian O Laoi 0–1, Kieran Molloy 0–1, Paul Conroy 0–1.

Penalty kicks
Shane Walsh
Damien Comer
Robert Finnerty
Matthew Tierney

Report
Rory Grugan 1–3 (0-2f), Aidan Nugent 1–2 (0-1m), Conor Turbitt 1–1, Rian O'Neill 0–4 (0-3f), Stefan Campbell 0–3, Jarlath Og Burns 0–1, Conor O'Neill 0–1, Eoin Woods 0–1, Jemar Hall 0–1, Justin Kieran 0–1.

Penalty kicks
Stefan Campbell
Rian O'Neill
Conor Turbitt

26 June 2022; 17:00; Quarter-final	Kerry	1–18 (21) – (13) 0–13	Mayo	Croke Park, Dublin; Attendance: 71,353; Referee: David Gough (Meath)
26 June 2022; 17:00; Quarter-final	David Clifford 1–3 (2 marks, 1 free), Paul Geaney 0–4 (1 mark), Tom O’Sullivan 0–3, Sean O’Shea 0–3 (1f), David Moran 0–2, Graham O’Sullivan, Gavin White, Killian Spillane all 0–1.	Report	Cillian O’Connor 0–3 (2f), Jordan Flynn 0–2, Stephen Coen, Aidan O’Shea, Matthew Ruane, Conor Loftus, James Carr, Kevin McLoughlin, Jack Carney, Rob Hennelly (free) all 0–1	Croke Park, Dublin; Attendance: 71,353; Referee: David Gough (Meath)

== Semi-finals ==
There was no semi-final draw as the pairings were arranged by rota.

9 July 2022; 17:30; Semi-final	Galway	2–08 (14) – (9) 1–06	Derry	Croke Park, Dublin; Attendance: 68,830; Referee: Brendan Cawley (Kildare); Man of the Match: Damien Comer
9 July 2022; 17:30; Semi-final	Damien Comer 2–2, Shane Walsh 0–4 (0-3f and 0–1 45), John Daly and Johnny Heaney 0–1 each	Report	Lachlan Murray 1–0, Shane McGuigan 0–3 (0-2f), Brendan Rogers 0–2, Niall Loughlin 0–1	Croke Park, Dublin; Attendance: 68,830; Referee: Brendan Cawley (Kildare); Man of the Match: Damien Comer

10 July 2022; 15:30; Semi-final	Dublin	1–13 (16) – (17) 1–14	Kerry	Croke Park, Dublin; Attendance: 73,609; Referee: Paddy Neilan (Roscommon); Man of the Match: Paudie Clifford
10 July 2022; 15:30; Semi-final	Ciarán Kilkenny 0–3, Dean Rock 0–3 (0–3f), Cormac Costello 1–0, Lee Gannon 0–1, John Small 0–1, Seán Bugler 0–1, Brian Fenton 0–1, Paddy Small 0–1, Brian Howard 0–1, James McCarthy 0–1	Report	Seán O'Shea 1–4 (0–2f), David Clifford 0–6 (0–1f, 0–1 mark), Paudie Clifford 0–2, Dara Moynihan 0–1, Tom O’Sullivan 0–1	Croke Park, Dublin; Attendance: 73,609; Referee: Paddy Neilan (Roscommon); Man of the Match: Paudie Clifford

== Final ==
RTÉ
Sky Sports

24 July 2022
15:30 IST (UTC+1)
All-Ireland Final

Report

Galway	0–16 – 0–20	Kerry
(HT: 0–08 – 0–07)
Pts: Shane Walsh 9 (4f, 1 '45), Cillian McDaid 4, Jack Glynn 1, Kieran Molloy 1, Johnny Heaney 1		Pts: David Clifford 8 (3f, 2 mark), Seán O'Shea 3 (3f), Paudie Clifford 2, Killian Spillane 2, Graham O’Sullivan 1, Paul Geaney 1 (1 mark), Diarmuid O'Connor 1, Stephen O’Brien 1, Gavin White 1

Croke Park, Dublin
Referee: Sean Hurson (Tyrone)
Attendance: 82,300
Standby: Paddy Neilan (Roscommon)
Linesman: Barry Cassidy (Derry)
Sideline: Sean Laverty (Antrim)
Umpires: Mark Coney (Ardboe O'Donovan Rossa), Mel Taggart (Clonoe O'Rahilly's), Cathal Forbes (Ardboe O'Donovan Rossa), Martin Conway (Moortown St Malachy's)

=== Bracket ===
Quarter-finals; 25/26 June
Galway (p)	2–21(4)
Armagh	3–18(1)
Derry	5–13
Clare	2–08
Dublin	0–21
Cork	0–10
Kerry	1–18
Mayo	0–13

Semi-finals; 9/10 July
Galway	2–08
Derry	1–06
Dublin	1–13
Kerry	1–14

Final; 24 July
Galway	0–16
Kerry	0–20

== Incidents ==
=== Hawk-Eye malfunction ===
The Hawk-Eye score detection system malfunctioned during the first half of the first All-Ireland SFC semi-final on 9 July between Derry and Galway, overruling an umpire who signalled that Shane Walsh's '45 into Hill 16 late in the half had gone over the bar. This meant that Galway entered the half-time break a point behind.

On Sky Sports at half-time, Jim McGuinness said: "It's a huge decision in the context of the game, and levelling the game up and Galway where they were, and to be back level at half time. I think the scoreboard should be level at half time, the reason I think that is because the technology got it wrong. The referee chalked it down as a point, the technology stepped in — it's not the other way around. the referee is well within his rights to say 'I got that right first time around, that's proven that it's right' and then to change the scoreboard. Otherwise, this game is going down to the wire, it feels that way and if it does go down to the wire, and that's what decides it, then we're in for major drama in the next couple of weeks". Over on RTÉ, Pat Spillane said: "It's an absolute joke. With our own two eyes, all of us here, that it went between the posts. It was most definitely a point. Hawk-Eye is available in a few grounds in Ireland, and they are getting huge money to get things right. A human error or not, that is scandalous. That is wrong". Lee Keegan added: "I can't even understand why they are calling Hawk-Eye. I don't see point in having it there if we can't get it right. As Pat rightly said, if that isn't rectified it is going to spoil the game."

A Conor Glass effort into the Davin End that Hawk-Eye ruled wide during the first half also came under scrutiny. "Conor Glass in the first-half... it looks like a point", Peter Canavan said on Sky Sports when the game had finished. Cora Staunton said on The Sunday Game the next evening: "When you look at that and get the behind the goals vision, that looks like it's a clear point, so yeah what happened yesterday with Hawk-Eye, it's not acceptable at that level. In an All-Ireland semi-final, you're training all year and something like that happens", while Oisín McConville said: "Even the Tailteann Cup game before it, it went to Hawk-Eye I think three times and you know, you question everything now. I mean all of the teams that have been beaten by a point, you question you know all along. Marty Clarke has also said that he thought had been a problem with Hawk-Eye and I think we all had accepted that that ball that's just marginally on the post, that that's over the bar. So it's not a correct science..."

The GAA issued a statement that evening confirming that Hawk-Eye would not be used during the second semi-final between Dublin and Kerry.

Galway GAA chairman Paul Bellew later stated that the team would not have returned to complete the second half of the game if Walsh's 45' had not been retrospectively awarded by the referee.

The GAA confirmed on 15 July that Hawk-Eye would return for the All-Ireland SHC final, following comprehensive testing and a full review of the score detection technology.

Glass, who expressed confusion after seeing Walsh's effort go over the bar only for it to be ruled out by Hawk-Eye, later said in an RTÉ Radio 1 interview: "I actually didn't realise (that the previous point was added on) until they went a point up after Shane Walsh's free kick five minutes into the second half... It wasn't communicated very well, either to the Derry staff or even the referee or GAA officials, that the point was added back on. The players didn't have a clue that it was."

== Stadia and locations ==
Locations of stadia used during the championship

Stadia
County	Location	Stadium	Capacity
Antrim	Belfast	Corrigan Park	3,700
Clare	Ennis	Cusack Park	19,000
Cork	Cork	Páirc Uí Rinn	16,440
Cork	Cork	Páirc Uí Chaoimh	45,000
Donegal	Ballybofey	MacCumhaill Park	17,500
Dublin	Drumcondra	Croke Park	82,300
Fermanagh	Enniskillen	Brewster Park	20,000
Galway	Galway	Pearse Stadium	26,197
Kerry	Killarney	Fitzgerald Stadium	40,000
Mayo	Castlebar	McHale Park	25,369
Meath	Navan	Pairc Tailteann	11,000
Monaghan	Clones	St Tiernach's Park	29,000
Offaly	Tullamore	O'Connor Park	18,000
Tipperary	Thurles	Semple Stadium	45,690
Waterford	Dungarvan	Fraher Field	15,000
Westmeath	Mullingar	Cusack Park	11,500
Wexford	Wexford	Wexford Park	18,000
Wicklow	Aughrim	Aughrim	7,000

== Referees panel ==
Anthony Nolan was unavailable for the 2022 championship due to injury. Ciaran Branagan retired as he had turned 50 in 2021. Noel Mooney and Niall Cullen returned in their place. Maurice Deegan turned 50 in 2022 and retired at the end of this season.

Championship Panel
Name	County	Club	Matches refereed
CASSIDY, Barry	Derry	Bellaghy	
CAWLEY, Brendan	Kildare	Sarsfields	
COLDRICK, David	Meath	Blackhall Gaels	
CULLEN, Niall	Fermanagh		
DEEGAN, Maurice	Laois	Stradbally	
FALOON, Paul	Down		
GOUGH, David	Meath	Slane	
HENRY, Jerome	Mayo		
HURSON, Sean	Tyrone	Galbally Pearses	
KELLY, Fergal	Longford		
LANE, Conor	Cork	Banteer	
MCNALLY, Martin	Monaghan	Corduff	
MCQUILLAN, Joe	Cavan	Kill Shamrocks	
MOONEY, Noel	Cavan		
NEILAN, Paddy	Roscommon	St Faithleach's	
O'MAHONEY, Derek	Tipperary		

== Statistics ==
=== Top scorers ===
==== Overall ====
Rank	Player	County	Tally	Total	Matches	Average
1	Shane Walsh	Galway	1–36	39	6	6.5
2	Shane McGuigan	Derry	2–28	34	5	6.8
3	Dean Rock	Dublin	1–27	30	4	7.5
4	Seán O'Shea	Kerry	1–26	29	5	5.8
5	Jimmy Hyland	Kildare	2–19	25	4	6.2
5	Steven Sherlock	Cork	0–25	25	4	6.2
7	David Clifford	Kerry	1–21	24	4	6
8	Cillian O'Connor	Mayo	1–18	21	4	5.2
9	Con O'Callaghan	Dublin	2–13	19	3	6.3
10	Darren McCurry	Tyrone	0–17	17	3	5.6

==== Single game ====
Rank	Player	County	Tally	Total	Opposition
1	Keelan Sexton	Clare	2-06	12	Roscommon

=== Scoring events ===
All records exclude extra time.

- Widest winning margin: 23 points
  - Dublin 1–24 – 0-04 Wexford (Leinster Quarter-final)
  - Galway 4–20 – 0-09 Leitrim (Connacht Semi-final)
  - Kerry 1–28 – 0-08 Limerick (Munster Final)
- Most goals in a match: 9
  - Wicklow 5–15 – 4–12 Laois (Leinster Preliminary round)
- Most points in a match: 41
  - Dublin 1–27 – 1–14 Meath (Leinster Semi-final)
- Most goals by one team in a match: 5
  - Louth 5–10 – 0–10 Carlow (Leinster Preliminary round)
  - Wicklow 5–15 – 4–12 Laois (Leinster Preliminary round)
  - Dublin 5–17 – 1–15 Kildare (Leinster Final)
  - Derry 5–13 – 2-08 Clare (All-Ireland Quarter-final)
- Most points by one team in a match: 28
  - Kerry 1–28 – 0-08 Limerick (Munster Final)
- Highest aggregate score: 54 points
  - Wicklow 5–15 – 4–12 Laois (Leinster Preliminary round)
- Lowest aggregate score: 23 points
  - Derry 1-06 – 2-08 Galway (All-Ireland Semi-final)

=== Miscellaneous ===
- First-time championship meetings:
  - Mayo v Monaghan (qualifiers round 1)
  - Clare vs Derry (quarter-finals)
- London and New York were both back in the Connacht championship after a 2-year break due to COVID-19.
- Dublin's longest period as Leinster champions continues with a historic 12 in a row.
- The All-Ireland title holders, Tyrone, were eliminated in the qualifiers; this is only the second time this has happened — the last time the holders were knocked out in the qualifiers was Tyrone in 2006.
- Its the first All-Ireland final between Galway and Kerry since 2000.
- Its the first Connacht final between Galway and Roscommon since 2019.
- Its the second Leinster final between Dublin and Kildare in a row.
- Its the first Munster final between Kerry and Limerick since 2010.
- Its the first Ulster final between Derry and Donegal since 2011.
- Derry win the Ulster Senior Football Championship for the first time since 1998, and reached the All-Ireland semi-finals for the first time since 2004.
- Galway reached the All-Ireland final for the first time since 2001.
- Jack O'Connor of Meath scored the fastest ever championship goal against Wicklow, scoring 7 seconds into their Leinster Quarter-final meeting.
- Clare retain their 100% win rate against Roscommon by beating the connacht side in the qualifiers.

== Awards ==
=== The Sunday Game Team of the Year ===
The Sunday Game team of the year was picked on 24 July, the night of the final. David Clifford was chosen as the Footballer of the Year by the RTÉ panel.

The Sunday Game Team of the Year

1. Shane Ryan (Kerry)
2. Liam Silke (Galway)
3. Jason Foley (Kerry)
4. Chrissy McKaigue (Derry)
5. James McCarthy (Dublin)
6. Tadhg Morley (Kerry)
7. Gavin White (Kerry)
8. Rian O'Neill (Armagh)
9. Cillian McDaid (Galway)
10. Paudie Clifford (Kerry)
11. Seán O'Shea (Kerry)
12. Ciarán Kilkenny (Dublin)
13. David Clifford (Kerry)
14. Damien Comer (Galway)
15. Shane Walsh (Galway)

=== All Star Team of the Year ===
The All Star Team of the Year was picked on 28 October. David Clifford was named as the All Stars Footballer of the Year with Galway's Jack Glynn picked as the All Stars Young Footballer of the Year.

Pos.	Player	Team	Appearances
GK	Shane Ryan	Kerry	1
RCB	Chrissy McKaigue	Derry	1
FB	Jason Foley	Kerry	1
LCB	Liam Silke	Galway	1
RWB	Tadhg Morley	Kerry	1
CB	John Daly	Galway	1
LWB	Gavin White	Kerry	1
MD	Conor Glass	Derry	1
MD	Cillian McDaid	Galway	1
RWF	Paudie Clifford	Kerry	2
CF	Seán O'Shea	Kerry	2
LWF	Ciarán Kilkenny	Dublin	6
RCF	David Clifford	Kerry	4
FF	Damien Comer	Galway	1
LCF	Shane Walsh	Galway	1

Player has previously been selected.

County breakdown

- Kerry = 7
- Galway = 5
- Derry = 2
- Dublin = 1

== See also ==
- 2022 Connacht Senior Football Championship
- 2022 Leinster Senior Football Championship
- 2022 Munster Senior Football Championship
- 2022 Ulster Senior Football Championship
- 2022 Tailteann Cup (Tier 2)
- 2022 All-Ireland Junior Football Championship (Tier 3)
