= Gavin White =

Irish Gaelic footballer

Gavin White is an Irish Gaelic footballer who plays for the Dr Crokes club and at senior level for the Kerry county team.

== Honours ==
Kerry

- All-Ireland Senior Football Championship (2): 2022, 2025

Individual

- All Star (1): 2022
- The Sunday Game Team of the Year (2): 2022, 2025
- All-Ireland Senior Football Championship Final Man of the Match (1): 2025

Sporting positions
Preceded by Shane Murphy	Kerry Senior Football Captain; 2019	Succeeded by David Clifford
