= David Coldrick =

Gaelic football referee

Personal information
- Occupations: Chief Risk Officer and Head of Actuarial Function
- Years active: 1994–2026
- Employer: GAA

Sport
- Sport: Gaelic football
- Position: Referee
- Club: Blackhall Gaels

David Coldrick (born 1976). is a former inter-county referee from County Meath. A member of the Blackhall Gaels club, he refereed four finals of the All-Ireland SFC.

Seán Moran, writing in The Irish Times in 2015, described Coldrick as "one of the least excitable referees on the inter-county scene. What might have been seen as diffidence earlier in his career has evolved into a patient and punctiliously polite demeanour, like a schoolteacher with a difficult class". In 2022, Martin Breheny named him among "five of the best football referees".

== Career ==
Coldrick began refereeing in 1994.

=== Club ===
Coldrick refereed the 2004 Meath SFC final and 2007 Meath SFC final replay.

=== Inter-county ===
Coldrick refereed the 2005 Munster SFC final.

He refereed the 2007 All-Ireland Senior Football Championship final between Cork and Kerry at Croke Park. He was the fourth Meathman to referee an All-Ireland final, following Dick Blake (1894, Dublin v Cork, drawn game and replay), Peter McDermott (1953, Kerry v Armagh, & 1956, Galway v Cork) and Paddy Kavanagh (1985, Dublin v Kerry). Coldrick later became part of a select group to referee more than one All-Ireland final when he took charge of the 2010 All-Ireland SFC final between Cork and Down.

In 2013, he toured counties, such as Meath, Longford and Louth, to explain the new black card to referees.

Coldrick was named as the referee for the 2015 All-Ireland SFC final between Dublin and Kerry on 8 September. That game (and Coldrick) featured in the documentary All Ireland Day.

In December 2020, he was named as referee for the 2020 All-Ireland SFC final between Dublin and Mayo.

At a referee conference in January 2015, Coldrick described missing the chance to show Down player Conor Maginn a black card in the 2014 Ulster Senior Football Championship and not awarding a penalty to Dublin when Cork players handled the ball on the ground during the 2013 All-Ireland SFC quarter-final as two of the lowest points of his career at that stage. He also said the following about the Ulster SFC: "Ulster makes or breaks you. It can be a graveyard. The games are different. There is an extra dimension and intensity, and you must be at your best. If you aren't prepared physically and mentally, the chances are you will be caught out. But when you are appointed for your first Ulster championship match, that's making progress".

Coldrick was referee for the 2022 All-Ireland SFC quarter-final between Armagh and Galway at Croke Park, during which he controversially issued straight red cards to both team captains following a brawl before extra-time, while missing Armagh's eye-gouging of Galway forward Damien Comer, which was immediately picked up by television cameras and widely condemned. The Irish Times said that Coldrick "hadn't had his sharpest day at the office".

In a 2025 interview with BBC Sounds, Coldrick described failing a fitness test ahead of the 2023 All-Ireland SFC as "the lowest point in my refereeing career obviously and it was splattered all over papers... I just felt like after 20 plus years of service to the GAA, that this was how I was treated?". Coldrick said he had injured his calf while refereeing a game in the last round of fixtures in the National League, and that he would like to have had the opportunity to do the test again when he had recovered.

2026 was his final year as an inter-county referee as he was forced to retire because of becoming 50 years of age. That year, he refereed the 2026 Connacht SFC semi-final (Mayo v Roscommon), the 2026 Leinster SFC final (Dublin v Westmeath), the 2026 All-Ireland SFC Round 1 (Mayo v Monaghan) and the 2026 All-Ireland SFC Round 3 (Armagh v Kerry).

=== International ===
Coldrick refereed during the 2005 and 2006 International Rules Series. He refereed the second test of the 2006 Series, at Croke Park, with Pat McEnaney chosen to referee the First Test at Pearse Stadium.

== Personal life ==
Coldrick left college in 1997 and joined Irish Life where he is Executive Manager of the Actuarial Reporting team.
