= Sean Hurson =

Gaelic football referee

Personal information
- Years active: 2008–present
- Employer: GAA

Sport
- Sport: Gaelic football
- Position: Referee
- Club: Galbally Pearses

Sean Hurson is a Gaelic football referee. He is a member of the Galbally Pearses club in County Tyrone. He was appointed to referee the 2022 All-Ireland Senior Football Championship Final, becoming the first Tyrone man to do so since Paddy Devlin oversaw the 1974 final.

Hurson was later appointed to referee the 2024 All-Ireland Senior Football Championship final.

== Career ==
Hurson began refereeing in 2008.

The coin that is used by Hurson, in the coin toss between the two captains at the beginning of each of Hurson's games, is a one pound coin engraved with Hurson's initials. It was presented to him by a former umpire of his, Dermot McCaffrey, the week before McCaffrey died in February 2019. McCaffrey advised Hurson that he would be there in spirit for the coin toss if he used it. That coin is kept by Hurson's umpires and used before every game in McCaffrey's memory.

=== Club ===
Hurson refereed the 2010, 2012 and 2013 Tyrone JFC final, as well as the 2013 Tyrone IFC final. He also refereed the 2014, 2016 and 2018 Tyrone Senior Football Championship finals.

At provincial club level, Hurson oversaw the 2016 and 2019 Ulster Club finals. At national level, he took charge of the 2015 All-Ireland Intermediate Club Football Championship final. He then oversaw the 2021–22 All-Ireland Senior Club Football Championship final between Kilcoo and Kilmacud Crokes.

=== Inter-county ===
Hurson refereed the 2014 National Football League Division 3 final and 2018 National Football League Division 2 final. He refereed the 2018 All-Ireland Minor Football Championship final, the 2021 All-Ireland Under-20 Football Championship final, the 2019 Leinster Senior Football Championship final, and the 2020 Connacht Senior Football Championship final.

He refereed his first championship game in 2016.

In the 2022 inter-county championship, Hurson oversaw the 2022 Connacht Senior Football Championship quarter-final between New York and Sligo, the 2022 Leinster Senior Football Championship semi-final between Kildare and Westmeath, the 2022 Ulster Senior Football Championship final between Donegal and Derry and the 2022 All-Ireland Senior Football Championship quarter-final between Dublin and Cork. He finished the season with the 2022 All-Ireland Senior Football Championship Final between Galway and Kerry, a first senior final for Hurson. Hurson is a clubmate of Kerry coach Paddy Tally. Ahead of the 2022 All-Ireland SFC final, Galway manager Pádraic Joyce was asked to comment on this. Kerry manager Jack O'Connor was also asked about it. Hurson sent off Paul Conroy in Galway's 2022 National Football League game against Derry.

By the end of 2022, Hurson had refereed every major national final except the Munster Senior Football Championship and the MacRory Cup, the latter of which he was appointed to referee in 2020 but the competition ended prematurely due to the COVID-19 pandemic.

Hurson was later appointed to referee the 2024 All-Ireland Senior Football Championship final. It was the 36th championship game (34th SFC) he had refereed.

== Personal life ==
Hurson is married and, as of 2022, was the father of two daughters and a son.
