= Matthew Tierney (Gaelic footballer) =

Gaelic footballer

Personal information
- Native name: Maithiú Ó Tiarnaigh (Irish)
- Born: 9 August 2000 (age 26)

Sport
- Sport: Gaelic Football
- Position: Right Half Forward
Club
- Years: Club
- 2018–: Oughterard
Club titles
- Galway titles: 1
- Connacht titles: 1
- All-Ireland Titles: 1
College
- Years: College
- NUI Galway
College titles
- Sigerson titles: 1
Inter-county
- Years: County
- 2021–: Galway
- Connacht titles: 3

Matthew Tierney is a Gaelic footballer who plays for Oughterard and the Galway county team.

== Playing career ==
Tierney won an All-Ireland Under-20 Football Championship with Galway in 2020, scoring four points in the final against Dublin.

He captained NUI Galway to the Sigerson Cup in 2022, meaning he had won an All-Ireland Under-20 FC, an All-Ireland Intermediate Club Football Championship and a Sigerson Cup by the time he was 21.

He made his championship debut in 2021, scoring a goal and three points against Roscommon and getting the RTÉ man of the match award. He was nominated for the Young Footballer of the Year Award. Pádraic Joyce appointed Tierney as vice-captain of Galway in 2022, he appointed Dylan McHugh as vice-captain in 2026.

In the 2022 All-Ireland quarter-final between Armagh and Galway at Croke Park, Armagh's Greg McCabe struck Tierney's head with his shoulder. Referee David Coldrick showed McCabe a straight red card, meaning he had to exit the game. The panel on The Sunday Game highlights programme was unanimous in its support for the decision. Tierney "got himself together" for the shootout and scored the penalty that sent Galway through.

== Honours ==
Galway

- Connacht Senior Football Championship: 2022
- All-Ireland Under-20 Football Championship: 2020

Oughterard

- All-Ireland Intermediate Club Football Championship: 2020

NUI Galway

- Sigerson Cup: 2022
