= John Daly (Gaelic footballer) =

Galway Gaelic footballer

Personal information
- Native name: Seán Ó Dálaigh (Irish)
- Born: 18 February 1998 (age 28) Galway, Ireland

Sport
- Sport: Gaelic football
- Position: Centre Back
Club
- Years: Club
- 2015–: Mountbellew–Moylough
Club titles
- Galway titles: 1
Inter-county
- Years: County
- 2019–: Galway
Inter-county titles
- Connacht titles: 3

John Daly is a Gaelic footballer who plays for the Mountbellew–Moylough club and at senior level for the Galway county team.

He is the son of Val Daly, who also played for Galway and was also a manager.

John Daly played for Galway in the 2022 All-Ireland Senior Football Championship Final. The referee Sean Hurson took him to task in the closing stages and Jim McGuinness said this was unfair afterwards. Daly won an All Star Award at the end of the season, joining his father as a recipient.

== Honours ==
Galway

- Connacht Senior Football Championship (2): ?, 2022

Individual

- All Star (1): 2022
