= Cillian McDaid =

Gaelic footballer

Personal information
- Native name: Cillian Mac Daibhéid (Irish)
- Born: 14 August 1997 (age 29)
- Height: 6 ft 1 in (185 cm)

Sport
- Position: Midfield
Club
- Years: Club
- Monivea Abbey
Inter-county
- Years: County
- 2017–: Galway
Inter-county titles
- Connacht titles: 3
- All-Irelands: 0
- All Stars: 1

Cillian McDaid (born 14 August 1997) is an Irish Gaelic footballer for Monivea Abbey and Galway.

== Career ==
He played Australian rules football with Carlton. He had a two-year professional contract which ended in 2018. He did not play a senior game though did play 6 games with the Northern Bullants Carlton's reserves affiliate in the Victorian Football League

He scored a goal and two points in the 2022 All-Ireland quarter-final between Armagh and Galway at Croke Park. He was the man of the match. He scored the second goal for Galway in the game. He was voted Footballer of the Week on the GAA.ie website. He also won an All Star that year.

He also played hurling for Craughwell and won an All-Ireland Minor Hurling Championship with Galway in 2015.

== Honours ==
Galway

- Connacht Senior Football Championship (3): 2022, 2023, 2024

Individual

- The Sunday Game Team of the Year (1): 2022
- PwC GAA/GPA Player of the Month Award: June 2022
- All Star (1): 2022
