= Kieran Molloy (Gaelic footballer) =

Gaelic footballer

Personal information
- Native name: Ciarán Ó Maolaí (Irish)
- Born: 27 June 1996 (age 30) Galway, Ireland
- Occupation: Site Engineer
- Height: 1.8 m (5 ft 11 in)

Sport
- Sport: Gaelic football
- Position: Wing back
Club
- Years: Club
- 2015–: Corofin
Club titles
- Galway titles: 6
- Connacht titles: 4
- All-Ireland Titles: 3
College
- Years: College
- University of Galway
Inter-county
- Years: County
- 2018–: Galway
Inter-county titles
- Connacht titles: 3

Kieran Molloy (born 27 June 1996) is a Gaelic footballer who plays as a half-back for Corofin and the Galway county team.

He played for Corofin and University of Galway in the same day in 2018 (All-Ireland Club and Sigerson Cup), rushing to Dublin to play in the Sigerson after the Corofin game.

Molloy was selected as Footballer of the Year at the AIB GAA Club Players' Awards at Croke Park in April 2019. He attempted the same in 2018.
