= Damien Comer =

Galway Gaelic footballer

Personal information
- Native name: Damien Ó Ciaragáin (Irish)
- Born: 11 January 1994 (age 32) Galway, Ireland
- Occupation: Secondary school teacher
- Height: 1.83 m (6 ft 0 in)

Sport
- Sport: Gaelic football
- Position: Full Forward
Club
- Years: Club
- 2012–: Annaghdown
Inter-county*
Years	County	Apps (scores)
2014–	Galway	37 (11-48)
Inter-county titles
- Connacht titles: 3
- NFL: 1 (Div.2)
- All Stars: 1
- *Inter County team apps and scores correct as of 23 April 2023.

Damien Comer (born 11 January 1994) is an Irish Gaelic footballer who plays for Annaghdown and at senior level for the Galway county team.

== Early life and playing career ==
Comer is a former pupil of St Jarlath's College in Tuam, and also a graduate of NUI Galway, with whom he reached the 2018 Sigerson Cup final.

Comer did not play for Galway at minor level.

He was a member of the Galway team that won the All-Ireland Under-21 Football Championship in 2013. He made his senior championship debut when he came on as a substitute against London in the 2014 Connacht SFC. Comer was part of the Galway team that won the 2016 Connacht SFC. He started all of the team's games as the county won its first Connacht SFC title since 2008.

Comer was introduced as a late substitute in Galway's 2025 Connacht SFC semi-final victory against Roscommon. He sustained an injury before the Connacht SFC final and did not feature in the matchday 26 until just before the second round robin game against Derry.

== Personal life ==
Comer completed a Bachelor of Science in anatomy and a master's degree in Teacher Education and Professional Development between 2016 and 2018.

He is a science and maths teacher at Coláiste Bhaile Chláir in Claregalway; during the COVID-19 pandemic in 2020, he spoke about the difficulty of teaching from home. His Galway teammate Paul Conroy also teaches at the same school.

Comer is in a long-term relationship with his girlfriend Megan Glynn.

== Career statistics ==
As of match played 23 April 2023

Team	Year	National League			Connacht		All-Ireland		Total	
Team	Year	Division	Apps	Score	Apps	Score	Apps	Score	Apps	Score
Galway	2014	Division 2	2	0–0	3	0–1	2	0–2	7	0–3
Galway	2015	Division 2	5	1–7	3	2–6	3	1–3	11	4–16
Galway	2016	Division 2	7	4–10	3	0–5	1	1–0	11	5–15
Galway	2017	Division 2	3	1–2	2	0–4	2	0–1	7	17
Galway	2018	Division 1	7	1–14	3	2–6	4	1–6	14	4–26
Galway	2019	Division 1	0	0–0	0	0–0	1	0–0	1	0–0
Galway	2020	Division 1	6	0–6	1	0–0	-		7	0–6
Galway	2021	Division 1	2	0–2	2	1–1	-		4	1–3
Galway	2022	Division 2	6	4–11	3	0–4	3	2–5	12	6–20
Galway	2023	Division 1	4	0–4	1	1–4			5	1–8
Career total			42	11–56	21	6–31	16	5–17	79	22–104

== Honours ==
Annaghdown

- Connacht Junior Club Hurling Championship: 2014
- Galway Junior A Hurling Championship: 2014

Galway

- Connacht Senior Football Championship(6): 2016, 2018 (c), 2022, 2023, 2024, 2025
- National Football League Division 2: 2017
- All-Ireland Under-21 Football Championship: 2013
- Connacht Under-21 Football Championship: 2013

Individual

- All Star (1): 2022

Preceded by Gary O'Donnell	Galway Senior Football Captain; 2018–2020	Succeeded by Shane Walsh
