= Owenie McAuliffe =

Irish Gaelic footballer, hurler, coach and administrator (1932–2021

Personal information
- Native name: Eoghan Mac Amhlaoibh (Irish)
- Nickname: Owenie
- Born: Eugene McAuliffe; 1932 Glanworth, County Cork, Ireland
- Died: 1 August 2021 (aged 89) Glanworth, County Cork, Ireland
- Occupation: Driver

Sport
- Sport: Hurling
- Position: Left corner-forward
Clubs
- Years: Club
- Ballyhooly; St. Patrick's, Fermoy; Glanworth; Shanballymore; Avondhu; Castlemagner; Duhallow; Kilworth
Club titles
	Football	Hurling
Cork titles	1	1
Inter-county
Years	County	Apps (scores)
1952–1954	Cork	0 (0-00)
Inter-county titles
- Munster titles: 0
- All-Irelands: 0
- NHL: 1

Eugene McAuliffe (1932 – 1 August 2021), known as Owenie McAuliffe, was an Irish hurler, Gaelic footballer, selector, coach and administrator. He played with a range of club sides, most notably Glanworth, divisional side Avondhu and in various inter-county grades with Cork.

== Playing career ==
McAuliffe first played hurling at under-16 level with Ballyholy, before later winning consecutive North Cork MHC medals with the St. Patrick's club in Fermoy. He was still eligible for the minor grade when he won the first of seven North Cork JFC medals with Glanworth in 1949. McAuliffe played his hurling with Shanballymore at this time and won a Cork IHC medal in 1951, after being runners-up the previous year.

McAuliffe's performances at club level resulted in a call-up to the Avondhu divisional team that won the Cork SHC title in 1952. He achieved a senior double in 1961 when, as part of the Avondhu senior football team, he won a Cork SFC medal. McAuliffe had earlier secured a junior double in 1954 when he won a Cork JHC medal with Castlemagner and a Cork JFC medal with Glanworth.

On the inter-county scene, McAuliffe first appeared as a member of the Cork senior hurling team that won the 1952–53 National League title. He never made the championship team but won a St. Brendan's Cup title after a defeat of New York in 1954. McAuliffe became a dual player at junior level in 1955 and captained the junior footballers to the All-Ireland JFC title after a defeat of Warwickshire in the final.

== Post-playing career ==
McAuliffe had been involved in the administrative affairs of the Glanworth club since 1959. He served in various capacities, including vice-chairman, secretary and treasurer. McAuliffe also held the role of president of the North Cork Board.

McAuliffe was a coach and trainer to various club teams throughout North Cork. At inter-county level with Cork, he had a long-standing association as trainer-selector with the minor team, with whom he won five All-Ireland MFC titles between 1967 and 1974. McAuliffe also trained two All-Ireland U20FC-winning teams around the same time and was a selector when the senior team won the Munster SFC title in 1971.

== Death ==
McAuliffe died on 1 August 2021, at the age of 89.

== Honours ==
=== Player ===
St. Patrick's, Fermoy

- North Cork Minor Hurling Championship: 1949, 1950
- North Cork Minor Football Championship: 1949, 1950

Glanworth

- Cork Junior Football Championship: 1954
- North Cork Junior Football Championship: 1949, 1950, 1952, 1953, 1954, 1962, 1963

Shanballymore

- Cork Intermediate Hurling Championship: 1951

Castlemagner

- Cork Junior Hurling Championship: 1954
- Duhallow Junior Hurling Championship: 1954

Kilworth

- North Cork Junior Hurling Championship: 1961

Avondhu

- Cork Senior Hurling Championship: 1952
- Cork Senior Football Championship: 1961

Cork

- National Hurling League: 1952–53
- All-Ireland Junior Football Championship: 1955 (c)
- Munster Junior Hurling Championship: 1955
- Munster Junior Football Championship: 1955 (c), 1957 (c)

=== Management ===
St. Dominic's

- Cork Minor Football Championship: 1966, 1967
- Cork Minor Football Championship: 1965, 1966, 1967, 1968

Cork

- Munster Senior Football Championship: 1971
- All-Ireland Under-21 Football Championship: 1970, 1971
- Munster Under-21 Football Championship: 1970, 1971
- All-Ireland Minor Football Championship: 1967, 1968, 1969, 1972, 1974
- Munster Minor Football Championship: 1966, 1967, 1968, 1969, 1971, 1972, 1973, 1974, 1976

Sporting positions
Preceded by	Cork junior football team captain 1955	Succeeded by
Achievements
Preceded by John O'Connor	All-Ireland Junior Football Final winning captain 1955	Succeeded by Pat Clarke
