= Connie Hartnett =

Irish Gaelic footballer (1951–2019)

Personal information
- Native name: Conchur Ó hAirtnéada (Irish)
- Nickname: con
- Born: 1951 Millstreet, Cork, Ireland
- Died: 17 December 2019 (aged 68) Cork, Ireland
- Occupation: Cattle dealer
- Height: 5 ft 10 in (178 cm)

Sport
- Sport: Gaelic football
- Position: Left wing-back
Club
- Years: Club
- Millstreet
Club titles
- Cork titles: 1
Inter-county
Years	County	Apps (scores)
1970–1976	Cork	10 (0-00)
Inter-county titles
- Munster titles: 3
- All-Irelands: 1
- NFL: 0
- All Stars: 0

Cornelius G. M. Hartnett (1951 – 17 December 2019) was an Irish Gaelic footballer who played for Cork Championship club Millstreet. He was a member of the Cork senior football team for six seasons, during which time he usually lined out as a left wing-back.

Hartnett began his Gaelic football career at club level with Millstreet. He broke onto the club's top adult team as a 17-year-old in 1968 after enjoying a hugely successful career at underage level that saw him secure five successive Duhallow Minor Championship titles.

At inter-county level, Hartnett was part of the successful Cork minor team that won back-to-back All-Ireland Championships in 1968 and 1969 before later winning back-to-back All-Ireland Championships with the under-21 team in 1970 and 1971. He joined the Cork senior team during the 1969–70 National League. Hartnett eventually became the first-choice left wing-back and made numerous National League and Championship appearances in a career that ended with his last game in 1975 before effectively being dropped from the team. During that time he was left wing-back on Cork's 1973 All-Ireland Championship-winning team. Hartnett also secured three Munster Championship medals.

== Playing career ==
=== Millstreet ===
Hartnett joined the Millstreet club at a young and played in all grades at juvenile and underage levels. He enjoyed a hugely successful underage career, winning five successive Duhallow Minor Championship medals between 1965 and 1969.

On 29 November 1968, Hartnett was still just 17-years-old when he lined out at left wing-back for the Millstreet senior team in the Tadhg Crowley Cup final. He ended the game with his first silverware at senior level after a 2–05 to 0–07 defeat of St. Finbarr's.

=== Cork ===
==== Minor and under-21 ====
Hartnett first played for Cork as a member of the minor team during the 1968 Munster Championship. He made his first appearance for the team on 5 July 1968 when he lined out at left wing-back in a 3–08 to 1–06 defeat of Waterford. On 14 July 1968, Hartnett won a Munster Championship when he again lined out at left wing-back in Cork's 2–13 to 0–02 defeat of Kerry in the final. He won an All-Ireland medal on 22 September 1968 following Cork's 3-05 to 1–10 defeat of Sligo in the All-Ireland final.

On 20 July 1969, Hartnett lined out in a second successive Munster final against Kerry. He ended the game with a second winners' medal after the 3–11 to 0–12 victory. On 28 September 1969, Hartnett was again selected at left wing-back when Cork faced Derry in the All-Ireland final. He claimed a second successive All-Ireland medal after the 2-07 to 0–11 victory.

Hartnett immediately progressed onto the Cork under-21 team and was included on the panel for the 1970 Munster Championship. He made his debut in the grade on 15 July 1970 when he lined out at left wing-back in a 2–13 to 0–10 defeat of Kerry. On 23 August 1970, he won a Munster Championship medal following Cork's 5–12 to 1–07 victory over Clare in the final. On 4 October 1970, Hartnett lined out at left wing-back when Cork qualified to play Fermanagh in the All-Ireland final. He ended the game with a winners' medal after the 2–11 to 0–09 victory.

On 12 August 1971, Hartnett claimed a second successive Munster Championship medal after Cork's 1–10 to 2–05 defeat of Waterford in the final. He was again selected at left wing-back when Cork qualified to play Fermanagh in a second successive All-Ireland final. Hartnett collected a second successive winners' medal after the 3–10 to 0–03 victory.

Hartnett lined out in a third successive Munster final on 22 August 1972. He ended the game on the losing side after the 1–11 to 2–07 defeat by Kerry in what was his last game in the grade.

==== Senior ====
Hartnett was just out of the minor grade when he was added to the Cork senior team during the 1969–70 National League. On 26 July 1970, he was an unused substitute when Cork suffered a 2–22 to 2–09 defeat by Kerry in the Munster final.

On 18 July 1971, Hartnett was selected amongst the substitutes when Cork qualified to play Kerry in the Munster final. He was introduced as a 74th-minute substitute for Kevin Jer O'Sullivan at right wing-back and claimed his first winners' medal after the 0–25 to 0–14 victory.

Hartnett was selected as a substitute when Cork faced Kerry in the Munster final on 16 July 1972. He remained on the bench throughout the game and ended on the losing side after a 2–21 to 2–15 defeat.

On 15 July 1973, Hartnett made his first championship start when he was selected at left wing-back when Cork faced Kerry in the Munster final. He ended the game with a second winners' medal following the 5–12 to 1–15 victory. Hartnett retained his position on the starting fifteen for the All-Ireland final against Galway on 23 September 1973. He ended the game with a winners' medal as Cork claimed the title for the first time since 1945.

On 14 July 1974, Hartnett participated in his fifth successive Munster final when he was selected in his customary position of left wing-back against Kerry. He ended the game with a third winners' medal after the 1–11 to 0–07 victory.

Hartnett made his sixth successive Munster final appearance on 13 July 1975. Lining out once again at left wing-back, he ended the game on the losing side after the 1–14 to 0–07 defeat.

Hartnett made no appearances for Cork during the 1975–76 National League after effectively being dropped from the team. He made several attempts to regain his place but was not included on the panel for the 1976 Munster Championship.

=== Munster ===
Hartnett was selected for the Munster inter-provincial team in advance of the 1974 Railway Cup. He was an unused substitute when Munster suffered a 1–07 to 1–04 defeat by the Combined Universities on 26 January 1974.

== Honours ==
Millstreet

- Tadhg Crowley Cup (1): 1968
- Duhallow Novice Hurling Championship (1): 1968
- Duhallow Minor Football Championship (5): 1965, 1966, 1967, 1968, 1969

Cork

- All-Ireland Senior Football Championship (1): 1973
- Munster Senior Football Championship (3): 1971, 1973, 1974
- All-Ireland Under-21 Football Championship (2): 1970, 1971
- Munster Under-21 Football Championship (2): 1970, 1971
- All-Ireland Minor Football Championship (2): 1968, 1969
- Munster Minor Football Championship (2): 1968, 1969
