= Séamus Looney =

Irish hurler and Gaelic footballer (1950–2022)

Personal information
- Native name: Séamus Ó Luanaigh (Irish)
- Born: 1950 Cork, Ireland
- Died: 6 June 2022 (aged 72) Cork, Ireland
- Occupation: General practitioner
- Height: 6 ft 0 in (183 cm)

Sport
- Football Position: Right corner-back
- Hurling Position: Centre-back
Clubs
- Years: Club
- 1968; 1974–1977 1968–1974: St Finbarr's → University College Cork
Club titles
	Football	Hurling
Cork titles	3	3
Munster titles	1	1
All-Ireland titles	0	1
College
- Years: College
- 1968–1974: University College Cork
College titles
- Sigerson titles: 3
- Fitzgibbon titles: 2
Inter-county
Years	County	Apps (scores)
1968–1972 1971–1972; 1977	Cork (hurling); Cork (football)	11 (0–02); 6 (0–00)
Inter-county titles
	Football	Hurling
Munster Titles	1	3
All-Ireland Titles	0	1
League titles	0	3

James V. Looney (1950 – 6 June 2022), known as Séamus Looney, was an Irish former hurler and Gaelic footballer. At club level he played with St Finbarr's and University College Cork and was also a member of the Cork senior teams as a dual player. In spite of a brief senior career, he was one of the most decorated players of his generation having won ten All-Ireland medals at various levels between 1967 and 1975.

== Career ==
Born in Cork, Looney first came to prominence at colleges level with Coláiste Chríost Rí. After winning provincial colleges titles in both codes in 1968, he subsequently won a Hogan Cup title. Looney simultaneously made his first impact on the club scene and won a County Hurling Championship title with St Finbarr's in his first full season. His medical studies at University College Cork saw him spend five seasons lining out with the college in the championship and various other tournaments. During that time Looney claimed multiple Fitzgibbon Cup and Sigerson Cup titles, three County Championship titles across both codes and a Munster Club Championship title.

On resuming his club career with St Finbarr's, he won an All-Ireland Club Championship in 1975. Looney began his inter-county career as a dual player at minor level with Cork. After winning consecutive All-Ireland Championships as a footballer, he subsequently won five All-Ireland titles in three seasons with the respective Cork under-21 teams. Looney was drafted onto the Cork senior hurling team in 1968 and was at midfield for their 1970 All-Ireland Championship success. His other honours include two Munster Championship titles, three National Hurling League titles and a Munster Championship title with the Cork senior football team.

== Death ==
Looney died in Cork on 6 June 2022, aged 72.

== Honours ==
Coláiste Chríost Rí

- Hogan Cup: 1968
- Corn Uí Mhuirí: 1968
- Dr Harty Cup: 1968
- Frewen Cup: 1967

University College Cork

- Munster Senior Club Football Championship: 1971
- Cork Senior Football Championship: 1969, 1973
- Cork Senior Hurling Championship: 1970
- Sigerson Cup: 1969, 1970, 1972
- Fitzgibbon Cup: 1971, 1972

St Finbarr's

- All-Ireland Senior Club Hurling Championship: 1975
- Munster Senior Club Hurling Championship: 1974
- Cork Senior Hurling Championship: 1968, 1974
- Cork Senior Football Championship: 1976

Cork

- All-Ireland Senior Hurling Championship: 1970
- Munster Senior Hurling Championship: 1969, 1970, 1972
- Munster Senior Football Championship: 1971
- National Hurling League: 1968–69, 1969–70, 1971–72
- All-Ireland Under-21 Hurling Championship: 1969, 1970, 1971
- All-Ireland Under-21 Football Championship: 1970, 1971
- Munster Under-21 Hurling Championship: 1969, 1970, 1971
- Munster Under-21 Football Championship: 1970, 1971
- All-Ireland Minor Football Championship: 1967, 1968
- Munster Minor Football Championship: 1967, 1968
- Munster Minor Hurling Championship: 1968
