= Martin O'Doherty =

Irish hurler and Gaelic footballer

Personal information
- Native name: Máirtin Ó Dochartaigh (Irish)
- Born: 26 March 1952 (age 74) Galway, Ireland
- Occupation: Construction project manager
- Height: 6 ft 2 in (188 cm)

Sport
- Sport: Hurling
- Position: Full-back
Clubs
- Years: Club
- 1969–1979 1970–1982: St. Nicholas'; Glen Rovers
Club titles
- Cork titles: 2
- Munster titles: 2
- All-Ireland Titles: 2
College
- Years: College
- University College Cork
College titles
- Fitzgibbon titles: 0
Inter-county*
| Years | County | Apps (scores) |
| 1971–1982 | Cork | 25 (0–00) |
Inter-county titles
- Munster titles: 6
- All-Irelands: 3
- NHL: 1
- All Stars: 3
- *Inter County team apps and scores correct as of 15:25, 28 February 2015.

Martin O'Doherty (born 26 March 1952) is an Irish former hurler who played as a full-back for the Cork senior team.

Born in Galway, O'Doherty first played competitive hurling during his schooling at Coláiste Chríost Rí. He arrived on the inter-county scene at the age of sixteen when he first linked up with the Cork minor teams as a dual player, before later joining the under-21 sides. He made his senior hurling debut during the 1971 championship. O'Doherty later became a regular member of the starting fifteen, and won three All-Ireland medals, six Munster medals and one National Hurling League medal. The All-Ireland-winning captain 1in 1977, he was an All-Ireland runner-up on one occasion.

As a member of the Munster inter-provincial team on a number of occasions, O'Doherty won one Railway Cup medal. At club level he is a two-time All-Ireland medallist with Glen Rovers O'Doherty also won two Munster medals and two championship medals.

Throughout his career O'Doherty made 25 championship appearances. He retired from inter-county hurling following the conclusion of the 1982 championship.

== Playing career ==
=== Colleges ===
During his schooling at Coláiste Chríost Rí in Cork, O'Doherty established himself as a key member of the senior hurling and Gaelic football teams. In 1968 he secured a remarkable provincial double, winning Harty Cup and Corn Uí Mhuirí medals following respective defeats of CBS Sexton Street and Coláiste Íosagáin. After a defeat by St. Peter's College in the subsequent Croke Cup decider, O'Doherty won a Hogan Cup medal following a 3–11 to 1–10 defeat of Belcamp College.

Two years later O'Doherty won a second Corn Uí Mhuirí medal following another defeat of Coláiste Íosagáin. He later added a second Hogan Cup medal to his collection following a narrow 4–5 to 1–13 defeat of St. Malachy's from Belfast.

=== University ===
During his studies at University College Cork, O'Doherty was an automatic inclusion on the college hurling team. In 1978 he was at full-back as UCC faced University College Dublin in the final of the Fitzgibbon Cup. A 3–15 to 2–7 defeat was the result on that occasion.

=== Club ===
O'Doherty enjoyed little success with Glen Rovers in the minor and under-21 grades, however, by 1972 he was a key member of the senior team. He won his first championship medal that year following a 3–15 to 1–10 of first-time finalists Youghal. A subsequent 2–9 to 1–10 defeat of former champions Roscrea gave O'Doherty a first Munster medal. On 9 December 1973 O'Doherty lined out in the All-Ireland decider against St. Rynagh's. Tom Buckley and Red Crowley inspired the Glen to a 2–18 to 2–8 victory, giving O'Doherty his first All-Ireland medal.

Glen Rovers surrendered their titles the following season, however, the team bounced back in 1976 with O'Doherty as captain. A 2–7 to 0–10 defeat of Blackrock gave him a second championship medal. He later added a second Munster medal to his collection following a 2–8 to 2–4 defeat of South Liberties. The subsequent All-Ireland decider on 27 March 1977 saw Glen Rovers face Camross. A relatively comfortable 2–12 0–8 victory gave O'Doherty a second All-Ireland medal, while he also had the honour of lifting the cup as captain.

=== Minor, under-21 and junior ===
O'Doherty first played for Cork as a member of the minor football team in 1968. He was a late addition to the starting fifteen, making his debut in the All-Ireland decider against Sligo on 22 September 1968. A narrow 3–5 to 1–10 victory gave O'Doherty an All-Ireland Minor Football Championship medal.

In 1969 O'Doherty was a dual player in the minor grade. He added a second Munster medal to his collection, as the footballers defeated Kerry by 3–11 to 0–12. A week later O'Doherty won his first Munster medal with the hurlers as Tipperary were accounted for on a score line of 1–12 to 2–4. On 7 September 1969 Cork faced Kilkenny in the All-Ireland decider. A 2–15 to 3–6 victory gave O'Doherty his first All-Ireland medal.

O'Doherty collected a second Munster medal with the hurlers in 1970 following a 3–8 to 4–4 defeat of Tipperary once again. The subsequent All-Ireland final on 6 September 1970 saw Cork faced Galway. A 5–19 to 2–9 trouncing gave O'Doherty a second consecutive All-Ireland medal, in what was his last game in the minor grade.

By the end of 1970 O'Doherty was also added to the Cork under-21 teams in both codes. He was an unused substitute as the Cork hurlers defeated Wexford by 5–17 to 0–8 in a replay of the All-Ireland decider, however, he was a regular member of the under-21 football side for the latter stages of the championship. On 4 October 1970 Cork faced Fermamagh in the All-Ireland final. A convincing 2–11 to 0–9 victory gave O'Doherty a first All-Ireland medal in that grade.

O'Doherty was a dual provincial medallist with the under-21s in 1971. A 5–11 to 4–9 defeat of Tipperary gave him his first Munster medal with the hurlers, while he also collected a first Munster medal with the footballers following a 1–10 to 2–5 defeat of Waterford. O'Doherty was at right corner-back for the subsequent All-Ireland hurling decider against Wexford on 12 September 1971. John Rothwell ran riot and scored four goals as Cork powered to a 7–8 to 1–11 victory. It was his first All-Ireland medal with the under-21s on the field of play. A week later Cork faced Fermanagh for the second successive year in the All-Ireland football decider. A 3–10 to 0–3 trouncing gave O'Doherty a second All-Ireland medal in that code.

1971 also saw Doherty link up with the Cork junior football team. A 2–7 to 1–5 defeat of Clare gave him a Munster medal.

The following year O'Doherty missed the Cork junior footballers provincial campaign, however, he was at left corner-back for the All-Ireland decider against Hertfordshire on 1 October 1972. A 5–16 to 0–3 thrashing gave him an All-Ireland medal.

In 1973 O'Doherty was captain of the under-21 hurling side. After missing the provincial decider he was back on the starting fifteen for the All-Ireland decider against Wexford on 11 November 1973. A 2–10 to 4–2 victory gave O'Doherty a second All-Ireland medal on the field of play, his third over all, while he also had the honour of collecting the cup.

=== Senior ===
O'Doherty made his senior championship debut on 4 July 1971 in a 2–16 to 2–14 Munster semi-final defeat by Limerick.

After being dropped from the panel the following year, O'Doherty returned as Cork's first-choice full-back from 1973. He won a National Hurling League medal the following year after a 6–15 to 1–12 trouncing of Limerick.

O'Doherty won his first Munster medal in 1975 following a 3–14 to 0–12 defeat of Limerick.

1976 saw Cork retain their provincial title with another huge 4–14 to 3–5 win over neighbouring Limerick. It was O'Doherty's second Munster medal. Wexford provided the opposition in the subsequent All-Ireland final on 5 September 1976. Wexford got off to a great start and were 2–2 to no score ahead after just six minutes. Wexford had a two-point lead with ten minutes to go, however, three points from Jimmy Barry-Murphy, two from Pat Moylan and a kicked effort from Ray Cummins gave Cork a 2–21 to 4–11 victory. It was O'Doherty's first All-Ireland medal.

O'Doherty was appointed captain of the team in 1977. He won a third successive Munster medal that year following a 4–15 to 4–10 defeat of fourteen-man Clare. The All-Ireland final on 4 September 1977 was a repeat of the previous year, with Wexford providing the opposition once again. Seánie O'Leary score the decisive goal for Cork as the game entered the last quarter, while Martin Coleman brought off a match-winning save from Christy Keogh to foil the Wexford comeback. A 1–17 to 3–8 victory gave O'Doherty a second All-Ireland medal, while he also had the honour of lifting the Liam MacCarthy Cup. He was later presented with his first All-Star.

Cork made it a fourth successive provincial title in 1978, with O'Doherty also collecting his fourth winners' medal following a narrow 0–13 to 0–11 defeat of Clare. On 3 September 1978 Cork faced Kilkenny in the All-Ireland decider. Cork went on to secure a first three-in-a-row of All-Ireland titles for the first time in over twenty years, as a Jimmy Barry-Murphy goal helped the team to a 1–15 to 2–8 victory over Kilkenny. It was O'Doherty's third successive All-Ireland medal, while he later secured a second All-Star.

Cork and O'Doherty won a record-equaling fifth successive Munster title in 1979 following a 2–15 to 0–9 trouncing of Limerick. Cork's quest for a fourth successive All-Ireland title ended with a semi-final defeat by Galway, however, O'Doherty was later presented with a third successive All-Star.

After emigrating to Los Angeles O'Doherty missed Cork's championship campaign in 1981. He was back the following year as Cork powered their way through the championship. A massive 5–21 to 3–6 defeat of Waterford in the provincial decider gave him a sixth Munster medal. On 5 September 1982 Cork faced Kilkenny in the All-Ireland decider. "The Cats", who many viewed as the underdogs, surprised all on the day, with Christy Heffernan scoring two goals in a forty-second spell just before the interval to take the wind out of Cork's sails. Ger Fennelly got a third goal within eight minutes of the restart, giving Kilkenny a 3–18 to 1–15 victory. O'Doherty retired from inter-county hurling following this defeat.

=== Inter-provincial ===
In 1978 O'Doherty was chosen at full-back on the Munster inter-provincial team. A 0–20 to 1–11 defeat of Connacht in the decider gave him a Railway Cup medal.

== Honours ==
Coláiste Chríost Rí

- Hogan Cup: 1968, 1970
- Corn Uí Mhuirí: 1968, 1970
- Harty Cup: 1968
- Frewen Cup: 1967

Glen Rovers

- All-Ireland Senior Club Hurling Championship: 1973, 1977 (c)
- Munster Senior Club Hurling Championship: 1972, 1976 (c)
- Cork Senior Hurling Championship: 1972, 1976 (c)

Cork

- All-Ireland Senior Hurling Championship: 1976, 1977 (c), 1978
- Munster Senior Hurling Championship: 1975, 1976, 1977, 1978, 1979, 1982
- National Hurling League: 1973–74
- All-Ireland Junior Football Championship: 1972
- Munster Junior Football Championship: 1971, 1972
- All-Ireland Under-21 Hurling Championship: 1970, 1971, 1973 (c)
- Munster Under-21 Hurling Championship: 1971
- All-Ireland Minor Hurling Championship: 1969, 1970
- Munster Minor Hurling Championship: 1969, 1970
- All-Ireland Minor Football Championship: 1968, 1969
- Munster Minor Football Championship: 1969

Munster

- Railway Cup: 1978

Sporting positions
| Preceded by Denis Coughlan | Cork senior hurling team captain 1977 | Succeeded by Charlie McCarthy |
Achievements
| Preceded by Iggy Clarke | All-Ireland Under-21 Hurling Final winning captain 1973 | Succeeded by Ger Fennelly |
| Preceded by Phil Larkin | All-Ireland Senior Club Hurling Final winning captain 1977 | Succeeded by Denis Burns |
| Preceded by Ray Cummins | All-Ireland Senior Hurling Final winning captain 1977 | Succeeded by Charlie McCarthy |
