= Pat Barry (hurler) =

Irish hurler and Gaelic footballer

Personal information
- Native name: Pádraig de Barra (Irish)
- Nickname: Fr. Pat
- Born: 1951 (age 74–75) Ballyphehane, Cork, Ireland
- Occupation: Roman Catholic priest
- Height: 6 ft 3 in (191 cm)

Sport
- Sport: Hurling
- Position: Right wing-back
Clubs
- Years: Club
- 1972-1980 1971-1976: Glen Rovers; St. Nicholas'
Club titles
- Cork titles: 2
- Munster titles: 1
- All-Ireland Titles: 1
College
- Years: College
- 1971-1976: Maynooth University
College titles
- Fitzgibbon titles: 2
Inter-county
Years	County	Apps (scores)
1973-1976	Cork	4 (0-00)
Inter-county titles
- Munster titles: 2
- All-Irelands: 1
- NHL: 0
- All Stars: 0

Patrick Barry (born 1951) is an Irish former hurler and Gaelic footballer. At club level he played with Glen Rovers and St. Nicholas' and was also a dual player with the Cork senior teams.

== Early life ==
Born and raised in Ballyphehane, Barry first played as a schoolboy in various juvenile competitions with Ballyphehane National School before later lining out as a student at Sullivan's Quay CBS in Cork. After beginning his clerical studies at St Patrick's College in Maynooth, Barry was part of the university's first ever Fitzgibbon Cup team. Maynooth University contested four successive finals during his time there and Barry won successive Fitzgibbon Cup titles in 1973 and as team captain in 1974.

== Club career ==
After beginning his underage career with Ballyphehane, a family connection to Blackpool resulted in Barry subsequently moving to Glen Rovers and sister club St. Nicholas'. After making his St. Nick's senior football team debut in 1971, he first played for the Glen's senior hurling team in 1972. Barry's debut season as a hurler ended with a defeat of Youghal in the county final. After claiming the subsequent Munster Championship title, he was at left corner-back when Glen Rovers beat St. Rynagh's in the 1973 All-Ireland club final.

Barry's clerical studies confined his sporting career to a degree as he was often only permitted to play during his summer holidays. After losing SHC finals in 1973 and 1975, he was team captain when Glen Rovers beat Blackrock in the 1976 final. Barry also lined out in the finals of 1978 and 1980 when he was home on holidays, however, the Glen was beaten on both occasions.

== Inter-county career ==
Barry first appeared on the inter-county scene when he was selected for the Cork minor football team in 1969. It was a successful season which culminated with him claiming an All-Ireland medal after a two-point win over Derry in the 1969 All-Ireland minor final. Barry was drafted onto the Cork under-21 hurling team in 1970 and was an unused substitute for the 1970 All-Ireland final replay defeat of Wexford. He switched codes once again the following year and claimed an All-Ireland U21FC medal after lining out at right corner-back in the 16-point defeat of Fermanagh in the 1971 All-Ireland under-21 final.

Barry was called up to the Cork senior football team during the 1971-72 National League. He made his championship debut when Cork beat Waterford in the 1972 Munster semi-final and was an unused substitute for the subsequent Munster final defeat by Kerry. Barry spent a further season as a Gaelic footballer before joining the Cork senior hurling team for the first of three successive Oireachtas Cup successes in 1973. He was panel member when Cork beat Limerick to win the 1975 Munster final before claiming his first title on the field of play in 1976. Barry was at right wing-back for the 2-21 to 4-11 defeat of Wexford in the 1976 All-Ireland final.

== Honours ==
Maynooth University

- Fitzgibbon Cup: 1973, 1974 (c)

Glen Rovers

- All-Ireland Senior Club Hurling Championship: 1973
- Munster Senior Club Hurling Championship: 1972
- Cork Senior Hurling Championship: 1972, 1976 (c)

Cork

- All-Ireland Senior Hurling Championship: 1976
- Munster Senior Hurling Championship: 1975, 1976
- National Hurling League: 1973-74
- Oireachtas Cup: 1973, 1974, 1975
- Munster Junior Football Championship: 1972
- All-Ireland Under-21 Football Championship: 1971
- Munster Under-21 Football Championship: 1971
- All-Ireland Under-21 Hurling Championship: 1970
- Munster Under-21 Hurling Championship: 1970
- All-Ireland Minor Football Championship: 1969
- Munster Minor Football Championship: 1969
