= Teddy O'Brien =

Irish hurler and Gaelic footballer

Personal information
- Native name: Éamonn Ó Briain (Irish)
- Nickname: Starry
- Born: 1949 Blackpool, Cork, Ireland
- Died: 8 August 2000 (aged 50) College Road, Cork, Ireland
- Occupation: Bank official
- Height: 5 ft 9 in (175 cm)

Sport
- Football Position: Full-forward
- Hurling Position: Left corner-back
Clubs
- Years: Club
- 1968-1983 1968-1983: Glen Rovers; St. Nicholas'
Club titles
	Football	Hurling
Cork titles	0	3
Munster titles	0	2
All-Ireland titles	0	1
Inter-county
Years	County	Apps (scores)
1969-1975 1971-1977	Cork (SF); Cork (SH)	6 (0-01); 4 (0-01)
Inter-county titles
	Football	Hurling
Munster Titles	2	3
All-Ireland Titles	1	1
League titles	0	2
All-Stars	0	0

James Edward M. O'Brien (1949 – 8 August 2000), known as Teddy O'Brien, was an Irish hurler and Gaelic footballer. At club level he played with Glen Rovers and St. Nicholas' and was also a member of the Cork senior teams as a dual player.

== Early life ==
Born and raised in Blackpool on Cork's northside, O'Brien first played as a schoolboy in various juvenile competitions before later lining out as a student at the North Monastery in various competitions, including the Harty Cup.

== Club career ==
O'Brien began his club career at minor level as a hurler with Glen Rovers and as a Gaelic footballer with sister club St. Nicholas'. He joined both clubs' senior teams in 1968. O'Brien enjoyed his first major success at club level when he lined out at left wing-forward on the Glen Rovers team that beat University College Cork in the 1969 Cork SHC final. Three years later he claimed a second winners' medal, this time lining out at left wing-back, when Youghal were beaten in the 1972 final. O'Brien later won his first Munster Club Championship medal after a two-point win over Roscrea, however, a suspension meant that he missed the Glen's defeat of St. Rynagh's in the 1973 All-Ireland club final.

Glen Rovers lost the 1973 Cork SHC final to Blackrock and again faced defeat by the same opposition in 1975 when O'Brien was team captain. He won a third county title with the Glen in 1976 when Blackrock were beaten by three points. O'Brien subsequently collected a second Munster Club Championship medal before lining out at left corner-back in the 2-12 to 0-08 defeat of Camross in the 1977 All-Ireland club final.

The following five seasons from 1977 to 1981 saw O'Brien lose four county finals with Glen Rovers. He was again team captain for the 1981 defeat by St. Finbarr's. O'Brien retired from club activity after the conclusion of the 1983 season.

== Inter-county career ==
O'Brien first lined out at inter-county level as a dual player with the Cork minor teams in 1967. His one-year tenure with the minors was a successful one as Cork completed a double of All-Ireland victories after defeats of Wexford and Laois. After a year out of the inter-county scene O'Brien was called up to the Cork under-21 teams in 1969 where he continued as a dual player. His debut season with the under-21 hurling team ended with a 5-13 to 4-07 defeat of Wexford in the 1969 All-Ireland under-21 final. O'Brien won a second successive All-Ireland medal as team captain after a replay defeat of Wexford in 1970, while he also won an All-Ireland medal with the under-21 football team after a defeat of Fermanagh in the 1970 All-Ireland under-21 football final.

O'Brien was still eligible for the under-21 grade when he made his Cork senior football team debut in the 1969-70 National League. He quickly became a member of the starting fifteen and claimed his first silverware after an 11-point defeat of Kerry in the 1971 Munster SFC final. O'Brien subsequently joined the Cork senior hurling team and was part of the team that won the 1971-72 National League title. His debut season as a hurler ended with a defeat by Kilkenny in the 1972 All-Ireland hurling final.

O'Brien spent much of the 1973 season as an unused substitute with the Cork senior football team. After making his only championship appearance of the year in the All-Ireland semi-final defeat of Tyrone, he remained as an unused substitute for the subsequent All-Ireland final defeat of Galway. O'Brien ended his dual status shortly after this win and committed solely to the Cork senior hurling team. He won a second National League title in 1974 before claiming a second Munster SHC title after a defeat of Limerick in the 1975 Munster final. After being dropped off the panel shortly afterwards he earned a recall a year later and was an unused substitute when Cork beat Wexford in the 1977 All-Ireland final. In what was his final game for Cork, O'Brien became the 15th player to have won All-Ireland senior medals in both codes.

== Personal life and death ==
O'Brien spent his working life with Lombard and Ulster Bank. He died after a period of illness on 8 August 2000, aged 50.

== Honours ==
Glen Rovers

- All-Ireland Senior Club Hurling Championship: 1977
- Munster Senior Club Hurling Championship: 1972, 1976
- Cork Senior Hurling Championship: 1969, 1972, 1976

Cork

- All-Ireland Senior Football Championship: 1973
- All-Ireland Senior Hurling Championship: 1977
- Munster Senior Football Championship: 1971, 1973
- Munster Senior Hurling Championship: 1972, 1975, 1977
- National Hurling League: 1971-72, 1973-74
- All-Ireland Under-21 Football Championship: 1970
- All-Ireland Under-21 Hurling Championship: 1969, 1970
- Munster Under-21 Hurling Championship: 1969, 1970
- Munster Under-21 Football Championship: 1969, 1970
- All-Ireland Minor Football Championship: 1967
- All-Ireland Minor Hurling Championship: 1967
- Munster Minor Football Championship: 1967
- Munster Minor Hurling Championship: 1967

Sporting positions
Preceded by Mick McCarthy	Cork under-21 hurling team captain 1970	Succeeded by Pat McDonnell
Achievements
Preceded by Mick McCarthy	All-Ireland Under-21 Hurling Final winning captain 1970	Succeeded by Pat McDonnell
