= Simon Murphy (hurler) =

Irish hurler and Gaelic footballer

Personal information
- Native name: Siomón Ó Murchú (Irish)
- Born: 1949 Ballinlough, Cork, Ireland
- Died: 7 April 1997 (aged 47) Mercy Hospital, Cork, Ireland
- Occupation: Engineer

Sport
- Sport: Hurling
- Position: Right wing-back
Clubs
- Years: Club
- 1967-1973 1967-1973 1967-1972: Blackrock; St Michael's → University College Cork
Club titles
	Football	Hurling
Cork titles	1	1
Munster titles	1	1
All-Ireland titles	1	1
College
- Years: College
- 1967-1972: University College Cork
College titles
- Sigerson titles: 1
- Fitzgibbon titles: 1
Inter-county
Years	County	Apps (scores)
1969-1972	Cork	1 (0-00)
Inter-county titles
- Munster titles: 1
- All-Irelands: 1
- NHL: 2
- All Stars: 0

Simon Murphy (1949 – 7 April 1997) was an Irish hurler and Gaelic footballer. At club level he played with St Michael's, Blascktock and University College Cork and was also a member of the Cork senior hurling team. In spite of a brief senior career, he was one of the most decorated players of his generation having won seven All-Ireland medals at various levels in both codes between 1967 and 1972.

== Career ==
Murphy studied at Presentation Brothers College in Cork where he was a noted athlete. He won the bronze medal in the high jump in the Willwood Tailteann Games in 1963. Around his time Murphy also began a remarkable run of success as a hurler and Gaelic football with Blackrock and its sister club St Michael's, winning numerous juvenile and underage honours. He eventually progressed onto the club's top adult teams and won an All-Ireland Club Championship title with Blackrock in 1972. He also lined out with University College Cork and was a Fitzgibbon Cup and Sigerson Cup medal-winner during his tenure there. Murphy first appeared on the inter-county scene as a dual player at minor level. He won four Munster minor medals, two in each code, across 1966 and 1967 while he was also a dual All-Ireland medallist in 1967 after Cork completed the double. Further success followed at under-21 level, with Murphy never losing a game and collecting three successive All-Ireland U21HC medals during his three seasons in the grade. He once again completed the double by also claiming an All-Ireland U21FC title in 1970. Murphy joined the Cork senior hurling team during their successful 1969-70 National League campaign before ending the season with an All-Ireland SHC title after coming on as a substitute in the final against Wexford in what was his only championship appearance. He claimed a second National League winners' medal in 1972 before announcing his complete retirement from club and inter-county activity.

== Death ==
Murphy died from cancer on 7 April 1997, aged 47.

== Honours ==
St Michael's

- Cork Intermediate Football Championship: 1969

Blackrock

- All-Ireland Senior Club Hurling Championship: 1972
- Munster Senior Club Hurling Championship: 1971
- Cork Senior Hurling Championship: 1971

University College Cork

- Munster Senior Club Football Championship: 1971
- Cork Senior Football Championship: 1969
- Fitzgibbon Cup: 1969
- Sigerson Cup: 1970

Cork

- All-Ireland Senior Hurling Championship: 1970
- Munster Senior Hurling Championship: 1970
- National Hurling League: 1969-70, 1971-72
- Munster Junior Football Championship: 1970
- All-Ireland Under-21 Football Championship: 1970
- All-Ireland Under-21 Hurling Championship: 1968, 1969, 1970
- Munster Under-21 Football Championship: 1970
- Munster Under-21 Hurling Championship: 1968, 1969, 1970
- All-Ireland Minor Hurling Championship: 1967
- All-Ireland Minor Football Championship: 1967
- Munster Minor Hurling Championship: 1966, 1967
- Munster Minor Football Championship: 1966, 1967
