= 2021 All-Ireland Minor Football Championship =

Gaelic football competition

All-Ireland Minor Football Championship 2021
Championship details
- Dates: 26 June - 28 August 2021
- Teams: 31

All-Ireland Champions
- Winning team: Meath (4th win)
- Captain: Liam Kelly
- Manager: Cathal Ó Bric

All-Ireland Finalists
- Losing team: Tyrone
- Captain: Cormac Devlin
- Manager: Gerard Donnelly

Provincial Champions
- Munster: Cork
- Leinster: Meath
- Ulster: Tyrone
- Connacht: Sligo

Championship statistics
- No. matches played: 30
- Goals total: 93 (3.1 per game)
- Points total: 699 (23.3 per game)
- Top Scorer: Hugh O'Connor (1-24)
- Player of the Year: Conor Ennis

The 2021 All-Ireland Minor Football Championship was the 90th staging of the All-Ireland Minor Football Championship since its establishment by the Gaelic Athletic Association in 1929. The championship began on 26 June 2021 and ended on 28 August 2021.

The 2021 championship was the first in over 90 years to begin before the previous year's championship has concluded. Derry entered the championship as the defending champions, however, they were beaten by Armagh in the Ulster quarter-final.

The All-Ireland final was played on 28 August 2021 at Croke Park in Dublin, between Meath and Tyrone, in what was their first ever meeting in a final. Meath won the match by 1-12 to 1-11 to claim their fourth championship title overall and a first title since 1992.

Cork's Hugh O'Connor was the championship's top scorer with 1-24.

== Results ==
=== Connacht Minor Football Championship ===
==== Connacht quarter-final ====
23 July 2021 Quarter-final	Roscommon	4-13 - 2-12	Mayo	Dr. Hyde Park
	B Nugent 0-4 (2f), S McGinley (0-1m), C Neary, R Heneghan (f) 1-1 each, R Conlon 1-0 (pen), DJ Hession 0-3, S Walsh 0-2, J McGreal 0-1.	Report	R Clarke 0-5 (5f), F Cruise 1-1, B McHale 1-0, C Dawson, P Deane (f) 0-2 each, C Corless, A Browne 0-1 each.

==== Connacht semi-finals ====
30 July 2021 Semi-final	Sligo	2-18 - 2-09	Leitrim	Markievicz Park
	L Marren 0-8, 4f; R Doherty 2-0; B Duffy 0-3; K Davey (50), J Donlon, M McDaniel, R Niland, S Rogan, S Donoghue & C McMorrow 0-1 each	Report	C McMorrow 1-2, 1f; B McKenna 1-1; C Doyle, B Guckian (f), J Casey (M), P Moran, B McNulty 0-1 each

31 July 2021 Semi-final	Galway	2-11 - 1-16	Roscommon	Tuam Stadium
	S Bermingham (0-2f) and E Monaghan (0-3f) 1-4 each, J Nolan 0-2 (0-1f), J Folan & C Greaney 0-1 each.	Report	B Nugent 0-8 (0-5f, 0-1m), S Walsh 0-3, R Heneghan 1-0, S McGinley (0-1 45, 0-1f) & R Conlon 0-2 each, DJ Hession 0-1.

==== Connacht final ====
6 August 2021 Final	Sligo	0-19 - 1-11	Roscommon	Dr. Hyde Park
	Luke Marren 0-11 (0-7f), Brian Duffy and Jack McGovern 0-2 each, Kyle Davey (1 '45), James Donlon, Joshua Flynn, Conor McMorrow (0-1f) 0-1 each	Report	Shane McGinley 1-2 (0-1m), Bobby Nugent 0-4f, Shane Walsh, DJ Hession, Ryan Conlon, Oisin O'Flaherty, Paddy Higgins 0-1 each	Referee: John Glavey (Mayo); Man of the Match: Luke Marren (Bunninadden)

=== Leinster Minor Football Championship ===
==== Leinster first round ====
26 June 2021 First round	Laois	1-11 - 0-14 (aet) (4-3 on penalties)	Wexford	MW Hire O'Moore Park
	K O'Donnell (0-6), C Murphy (1-2); S Brennan (0-1), D McGrath (0-1), D Costello (0-1).		K Rankin (0-5), D Purcell (0-3), C Hughes (0-2); D Cooke Leonard (0-1); C Murphy (0-1), E Whelan (0-1); T Mythen (0-1).

26 June 2021 First round	Westmeath	0-10 - 3-10	Louth	TEG Cusack Park
	B Cooney (0-5), S Keenan (0-4), R Holding (0-1).		L Flynn (2-5), K McArdle (1-0), A Lambe (0-1); G Hanlon (0-1), D Akin (0-1), D McDonnell (0-1), C Maher (0-1).

26 June 2021 First round	Kildare	4-10 - 1-12	Longford	St Conleth's Park
	G Thompson (1-5), E Beirne (1-3), J Harris (1-0), N Dolan (1-0), F Cooke (0-2).		M Flynn (0-7), P Moran (1-1), E Brady (0-3); M Duffy (0-1).

26 June 2021 First round	Carlow	3-14 - 2-15	Wicklow	Netwatch Cullen Park
	R Quinlan 1-8, O Doyle 1-2, B Bolger 1-0, D Murphy 0-2, S Smyth 0-1, C Fegan 0-1.		C Fee 1-5, F Treacy 1-4, S Doyle 0-2, W Moorehouse 0-2, C Baker 0-1, A Brennan 0-1.

==== Leinster quarter-finals ====
10 July 2021 Quarter-final	Dublin	3-12 - 0-6	Offaly	Bord na Móna O'Connor Park
	Tadhg Gorman 0-6 (0-3f), Sean Gannon 1-3 (0-1f), Scott McConnell 1-1 (0-1f), Mark McNally 1-0, Ciaran Duggan and Eoghan O’Connor Flanagan 0-1 each	Report	Geordi O'Meara 0-2f, Donal Shirley, Marcus Dalton, Luke Bourke, Robbie Gallagher 0-1 each	Referee: Keith O'Brien (Westmeath)

10 July 2021 Quarter-final	Louth	4-07 - 1-07	Laois	Stabannon Parnells Grounds
	K McArdle 4-1 (one 45), L Flynn 0-2 (one free), F Cumiskey 0-1, D McDonnell 0-1, G Hanlon 0-1, D Akin 0-1	Report	K O’Donnell 1-0, D Costello 0-2, J Byrne 0-2, C Murphy 0-2 (two free), C Brown 0-1 (one 45)

10 July 2021 Quarter-final	Kildare	6-18 - 1-07	Carlow	St Conleth's Park
	G Thompson 1-3 (penalty, 3 frees), P Mahoney 0-4 (1 free), E Beirne 0-4, F Cooke 1-1, C Dalton 1-0, M Gibbons 1-0, M O'Donovan 1-0, R Behan O'Shea 1-0, N Dolan 0-3 (1 free), J Harris 0-1, D MacPartlin 0-1 (45), K Browne 0-1.	Report	R Quinlan 0-5 (4 frees), S Smyth 1-0, O Doyle 0-2.

==== Leinster semi-finals ====
24 July 2021 Semi-final	Meath	1-15 - 1-11	Louth	Páirc Tailteann
	Hughie Corcoran 0-7 (0-2f), Oisin O Murchu 1-0, Jack Kinlough, Andrew Moore, Rian McConnell (0-1f) 0-2 each, Paul Wilson and Conor McWeeney 0-1 each	Report	Fionn Cumiskey 1-0, Liam Flynn 0-3f, Sean Reynolds (0-2f) and Kieran McArdle (1 '45) 0-2 each, Aaron McGlew, Dara McDonnell, Adam Lambe, Oisin Gray 0-1 each	Referee: Marius Stones (Offaly)

24 July 2021 Semi-final	Dublin	0-13 - 2-05	Kildare	Parnell Park
	Tadhg Gorman 0-5 (0-2f), Ciaran Duggan and Mark McNally 0-2 each, Ronan Geoghegan, Sean Gannon (0-1f), Scott McConnell (0-1m), Karl Flynn (0-1m) 0-1 each	Report	Gavin Thompson 0-4 (0-2f), Elliot Byrne 1-1, Fionn Cooke 1-0	Referee: Patrick Maguire (Longford)

==== Leinster final ====
2 August 2021 Final	Dublin	1-03 - 3-08	Meath	Bord na Móna O'Connor Park
	Hughie Corcoran 1-5 (0-5f), Oisin O Murchu 1-2, Sean Emmanuel 1-0, Shaun Leonard 0-1	Report	Scott McConnell 1-1 (0-1f), Sean Gannon (0-1f) and Reuban Cahill 0-1 each	Referee: Fintan Pierce (Offaly); Man of the Match: Sean Emmanuel (St Patrick's)

=== Munster Minor Football Championship ===
==== Munster quarter-finals ====
21 July 2021 Quarter-final	Limerick	2-09 - 1-09	Tipperary	LIT Gaelic Grounds
	D Murray (0-4, 3f), C O’Duinn (0-3, 1f), M Nolan and R Cronin (1-0) each, J Somers (0-2).	Report	D McVicker (0-3, 2f), D O’Riordan (1-0), N O’Connor, C King, T Sheehan, F Fitzgerald, E Craddock and C Smith (0-1) each.	Referee: E Moran (Kerry)

21 July 2021 Quarter-final	Waterford	0-03 - 5-28	Cork	Fraher Field
	A Murray 0-3 (3fs).	Report	J O’Driscoll 3-0, H O’Connor 0-9 (3fs, 2 marks), N Kelly 0-8, R Corkery 0-7 (2fs), D O’Brien, N Daly 1-0 each, M McSweeney 0-2, F Crowley, R O’Shaughnessy 0-1 each.	Referee: N Quinn (Clare)

==== Munster semi-finals ====
30 July 2021 Semi-final	Clare	0-12 - 3-11	Limerick	Cusack Park
	C Riordan (0-6, 2 ’45, 2f), O Cunningham (0-1), C Meaney (0-1), O Sexton (0-1), S Rynne (0-1), D O’Brien (0-1), S McMahon (Miltown) (0-1).	Report	D Murray (1-4, 1-0 pen, 2f, 1 ’45), R Quirke (1-0), E Rigter (1-0), C Ó Duinn (0-2), L Murphy (0-1), R Cronin (0-1), J Somers (0-1), M Nolan (0-1), S Geraghty (0-1).	Referee: C Dineen (Cork)

30 July 2021 Semi-final	Cork	1-15 - 1-14	Kerry	Páirc Uí Chaoimh
	N Kelly (0-6, 0-1 free); H O’Connor (0-4, 0-3 frees); J O’Neill (0-3); M McSweeney (1-0); D O’Brien, J O’Driscoll (0-1 each).	Report	E Hassett (1-9, 0-5 frees); L Crowley (0-2); R Monahan, J Clifford, D O’Callaghan (0-1 each).	Referee: C Maguire (Clare)

==== Munster final ====
11 August 2021 Final	Cork	1-17 - 0-13	Limerick	Semple Stadium
	Hugh O'Connor 1-7 (0-2f), Jamie O’Driscoll 0-2, Dan Twomey, Sam Copps, Michael McSweeney, Rory O'Shaughnessy, Jack O'Neill, Colm Gillespie, Dylan Crowley, Luke O'Herlihy 0-1 each	Report	Darragh Murray 0-8 (0-7f), Sean Geraghty 0-2, Emmet Rigter, Ruairi Cronin, Conall Ó Duinn 0-1 each	Referee: Chris Maguire (Clare); Man of the Match: Hugh O'Connor (Newmarket)

=== Ulster Minor Football Championship ===
==== Ulster preliminary round ====
21 July 2021 Preliminary round	Donegal	4-22 - 0-08	Antrim	MacCumhaill Park
	P McElwee (2-2), K McCormack (1-5), M Callaghan (1-3, 0-1M), L McGlynn (0-6, 0-3fs), S Ward (0-2, 0-1f, C Reid (0-1); C McGinty (0-1); D Marley (0-1), E Friel (0-1).	Report	S Byrne (0-2, 0-2fs), D Rogan (0-2), P Gowdy (0-1, 0-1f), C Hastings (0-1, 0-1f), J Hannon (0-1, 0-1f); T Shivers (0-1).

==== Ulster quarter-finals ====
28 July 2021 Quarter-final	Cavan	1-11 - 1-12	Fermanagh	Kingspan Breffni Park
	D Madden (0-3, 1f); D Lovett (1-3, 2f, pen); O McCrystal (0-1), B Donnelly (0-1), C McGovern (0-1), R Tobin (0-1), O McCrystal (0-1).	Report	C Farry (0-7, 6f); C O’Brien (1-0); D Morris (0-1); D Owens (0-1), J McCaffrey (0-1), C O’Hanlon (0-1); C Ward (0-1).

28 July 2021 Quarter-final	Tyrone	3-16 - 0-09	Down	Healy Park
	G Potter 1-3, R McHugh 1-2, S O’Hare 1-0, C Devlin 0-7 (3 frees), E McElholm 0-3, C Owens 0-1 (f).	Report	D Scullion 0-3 (2f), E Rogers 0-2, M Murdock (mark), J Doran, E Loughran (f), PJ McKeown 0-1 each

28 July 2021 Quarter-final	Derry	0-11 - 0-12	Armagh	Owenbeg
	J McGroarty, R McNicholl, N O’Donnell and R McGill 0-2 each, R Walls, P Walls, and C Bateson 0-1 each.	Report	L McKeever, C Campbell and E McKenna 0-2 each. C O’Neill, T Grimley, M Burnett, R McVeigh, A O’Neill and B Cassidy 0-1 each.

28 July 2021 Quarter-final	Monaghan	0-10 - 1-09	Donegal	St Tiernach's Park
	S Mooney 0-7 (2f, 1m); N Rice 0-2 (1m); C Conlon 0-1f.	Report	L McGlynn 1-1 (1-0 pen); C Reid, M Callaghan 0-2 each; C McGinty, S Martin, P McElwee, G Kelly 0-1 each.

==== Ulster semi-finals ====
6 August 2021 Semi-final	Armagh	0-05 - 1-06	Donegal	Healy Park
	R Stevens 0-2, F O’Brien, L McKeever (f) C Campbell 0-1 each.	Report	L McGlynn 1-1 (0-1f), K McCormack, S Ward, O Caulfield, K Magee, C McGeever 0-1 each.

7 August 2021 Semi-final	Tyrone	6-21 - 1-06	Fermanagh	Healy Park
	R Cassidy 2-3, E McElholm, N Grimes 1-1 each, P McCann, S O’Hare 1-0 each, C Devlin 0-6 (3f), C Owens 0-4 (1f)) G Potter, 0-3, R Strain 0-2 each, B Hampsey 0-1.	Report	D McCann 1-1 (0-1f), C Farry 0-2 (2f), D Owens 0-2 each, S Conlon 0-1 each.

==== Ulster final ====
13 August 2021 Final	Donegal	1-07 - 2-11	Tyrone	Brewster Park
	K Molloy (1-0), S Martin (0-1), S Ward (0-1), K McCormack (0-1), D Marley (0-1), M Callaghan (0-1), L McGlynn (0-1 free), D Gallagher (0-1).	Report	C Devlin (1-3), C Owens (1-1), R Cassidy (0-2, one free), E McElholm (0-2, one mark), R Donnelly (0-1), R Strain (0-1), G Potter (0-1).

=== All-Ireland Minor Football Championship ===
==== All-Ireland semi-finals ====
21 August 2021 Semi-final	Meath	2-14 - 2-09	Sligo	Kingspan Breffni Park
	C Finlay (1-3); J Mannion (1-0); H Corcoran (0-3, 2f); O O Murchu (mark), S Leonard (0-2 each); O McDermott ('45), C Ennis, T Corbett, C McWeeney (0-1 each).	Report	L Marren (0-6, 6f); B Duffy (pen), J McGovern (1-0 each); C McMorrow (0-2, 1f); M McDaniel (0-1).	Referee: P Faloon (Down)

21 August 2021 Semi-final	Tyrone	0-23 - 1-06	Cork	Bord na Móna O'Connor Park
	R Cassidy 0-5 (0-2 f), E McElholm 0-4, C Owens 0-4 (0-3 f), J Martin 0-3, C Devlin 0-2 (0-1 f), H Cunningham 0-2 f, R McHugh, R Strain, G Potter 0-1 each.	Report	H O’Connor 0-4 (0-3 f), D Crowley 1-1, A Kelleher 0-1.	Referee: B Tiernan (Dublin)

==== All-Ireland final ====
28 August 2021 Final	Meath	1-12 - 1-11	Tyrone	Croke Park
	O Ó Murchú 1-2, H Corcroan 0-3, 1f, O McDermott,(2 45s), S Leonard 0-2 each, J Kinlough 0- S Emmanuel, C McSweeney 0-1 each.	Report	C Devlin 1-1 R Cassidy 0-3, (2f) R McHugh E McElhom (2f), C Owens (2f), 0-2 each, H Cunningham 0-1 (1f).	Referee: D O'Mahoney (Tipperary)

== Championship statistics ==
=== Top scorers ===
Top scorer overall

Rank	Player	Club	Tally	Total	Matches	Average
1	Hugh O'Connor	Cork	1-24	27	4	6.75
2	Cormac Devlin	Tyrone	2-19	25	5	5.00
2	Luke Marren	Sligo	0-25	25	3	8.33
4	Hughie Corcoran	Meath	1-18	21	4	5.25
5	Ronan Cassidy	Tyrone	2-13	19	5	3.80
5	Darragh Murray	Limerick	1-16	19	3	6.33
7	Kieran McArdle	Louth	5-03	18	3	6.00
7	Gavin Thompson	Kildare	2-12	18	3	6.00
9	Liam Flynn	Louth	2-10	16	3	5.33
9	Ronan Quinlan	Carlow	1-13	16	2	8.00
9	Bobby Nugent	Roscommon	0-16	16	3	5.33

In a single game

Rank	Player	Club	Tally	Total	Opposition
1	Kieran McArdle	Louth	4-01	13	Laois
2	Eoghan Hassett	Kerry	1-09	12	Cork
3	Liam Flynn	Louth	2-05	11	Westmeath
3	Ronan Quinlan	Carlow	1-08	11	Wicklow
3	Luke Marren	Sligo	0-11	11	Roscommon
6	Hugh O'Connor	Cork	1-07	10	Limerick
7	Jamie O'Driscoll	Cork	3-00	9	Waterford
7	Ronan Cassidy	Tyrone	2-03	9	Fermanagh
7	Hugh O'Connor	Cork	0-09	9	Waterford
10	Paddy McElwee	Donegal	2-02	8	Antrim
10	Gavin Thompson	Kildare	1-05	8	Longford
10	Hughie Corcoran	Meath	1-05	8	Dublin
10	Conor Fee	Wicklow	1-05	8	Carlow
10	Kevin McCormack	Donegal	1-05	8	Antrim
10	Niall Kelly	Cork	0-08	8	Waterford
10	Luke Marren	Sligo	0-08	8	Leitrim
10	Bobby Nugent	Roscommon	0-08	8	Galway
10	Darragh Murray	Limerick	0-08	8	Cork

=== Miscellaneous ===
- Sligo won the Connacht Championship for the first time since 1968.
- Cork won the Munster Championship for the first time since 2010.
