= Hugh O'Connor (Gaelic footballer) =

Irish Gaelic footballer and hurler

Personal information
- Native name: Aodh Ó Conchubhair (Irish)
- Born: 2004 (age 21–22) Newmarket, County Cork, Ireland
- Occupation: Student
- Height: 5 ft 10 in (178 cm)

Sport
- Sport: Gaelic Football, Hurling
- Position: Centre-forward
Clubs
- Years: Club
- 2023-present 2024-present: Newmarket → Duhallow
Club titles
- Cork titles: 0
College
- Years: College
- 2022-present: University College Cork
College titles
- Sigerson titles: 0
Inter-county
Years	County	Apps (scores)
2025-	Cork	0 (0-00)
Inter-county titles
- Munster titles: 0
- All-Irelands: 0
- NFL: 0
- All Stars: 0

Hugh O'Connor (born 2004) is an Irish Gaelic footballer and Hurler. At club level, he plays with Newmarket and at inter-county level with the Cork senior football team. O'Connor usually lines out as a forward.

== Career ==
O'Connor played Gaelic football and hurling at all levels as a student at Coláiste Treasa in Kanturk. He was part of the school's senior team that won the Munster PPS SCHC title in 2020 after a 2-14 to 2-12 win over Scoil Pól Kilfinane in the final. O'Connor later lined out with University College Cork in the Sigerson Cup.

At club level, O'Connor played with Robert Emmets at juvenile and underage levels. He top scored with seven points when the amalgamation won the Duhallow U21AFC title in 2025, following a 0-14 to 1-10 win over Dromtarriffe/Kanturk in the final. O'Connor first played at adult level with the Newmarket club as a dual player in 2023. He won a Duhallow JAHC title in 2023, after scoring 2-01 in the 4-14 to 2-13 win over Dromtarriffe in the final. O'Connor has also been selected for the Duhallow divisional hurling team.

At inter-county level, O'Connor first played for Cork as a member of the minor team in 2021. He was joint-captain that year when the team claimed the Munster MFC title after a 1-17 to 0-13 win over Limerick. He ended the season as the championship's top scorer with 1-24. O'Connor later spent three seasons with the under-20 team, including one as team captain, but ended his tenure in that grade without silverware. He also lined out with Cork's under-20 hurling team.

O'Connor made his senior team debut when he came on as a substitute for Chris Óg Jones in a 2-21 to 0-13 defeat by Roscommon in March 2025.

== Career statistics ==
=== Club ===
As of match played 14 September 2025.

Team	Year	Cork SAFC	
Team	Year	Apps	Score
Newmarket	2023	4	0-15
Newmarket	2024	3	1-09
Newmarket	2025	3	0-12
Career total		10	1-36

=== Inter-county ===
As of 5 April 2026

Team	Year	National League			Munster		All-Ireland		Total	
Team	Year	Division	Apps	Score	Apps	Score	Apps	Score	Apps	Score
Cork	2026	Division 2	3	0-02	0	0-00	0	0-00	3	0-02
Total			3	0-02	0	0-00	0	0-00	3	0-02

== Honours ==
Coláiste Treasa

- Munster PPS Senior C Hurling Championship: 2020

Robert Emmets

- Duhallow Under-21 A Football Championship: 2025

Newmarket

- Duhallow Junior A Hurling Championship: 2023, 2025, 2026

Cork

- Munster Minor Football Championship: 2021

Sporting positions
Preceded by Eoghan Nash	Cork minor football team co-captain 2021	Succeeded by Colm Gillespie
Preceded by Jacob O'Driscoll	Cork under-20 football team captain 2024	Succeeded by Colin Molloy
