= Pat O'Doherty (dual player) =

Irish former sportsperson (born 1947)

Personal information
- Native name: Pádraig Ó Dochartaigh (Irish)
- Born: 1947 (age 78–79) Mullingar, County Westmeath, Ireland
- Occupation: Accountant

Sport
- Football Position: Midfield
- Hurling Position: Left wing-forward
Clubs
- Years: Club
- 1965-1970 1968-1970 1972-1979 1972-1979: St Patrick's → University College Cork; Glen Rovers; St Nicholas'
Club titles
	Football	Hurling
Cork titles	1	2
Munster titles	0	2
All-Ireland titles	0	2
College
- Years: College
- 1966-1970: University College Cork
College titles
- Sigerson titles: 2
- Fitzgibbon titles: 0
Inter-county
Years	County	Apps (scores)
1968 1972-1973; 1976 1970	Limerick (SH); Cork (SH); Cork (SF)	0 (0-00); 2 (0-00)
Inter-county titles
	Football	Hurling
Munster Titles	0	0
All-Ireland Titles	0	0
League titles	0	0

Patrick O'Doherty (born 1947) is an Irish former hurler and Gaelic footballer. At club level he played with St Patrick's, Glen Rovers and St Nicholas'. O'Doherty also lined out at inter-county level with Limerick and Clare. His brother, Martin O'Doherty, captained Cork to the All-Ireland SHC title in 1977.

== Career ==
Born in County Westmeath, O'Doherty had his first sporting successes as a student at Limerick CBS. He was part of the school team that won three successive Harty Cup titles, as well as Croke Cup medals in 1964 and 1966. These victories resulted in a call-up to the Limerick minor team, and O'Doherty was at midfield for the defeat by Dublin in the 1965 All-Ireland minor final. He later progressed to the under-21 and senior teams as a dual player and made his Munster SHC debut against Cork in 1968.

O'Doherty was, by that stage, playing his club hurling with St Patrick's. He continued his dual player status during his student days with University College Cork and won consecutive Sigerson Cup medals while also playing with the Fitzgibbon Cup team. After winning the Cork SFC title with UCC in 1969, O'Doherty was called up to the Cork senior football team and captained the team in 1970.

After a period of time spent in England, O'Doherty joined the Glen Rovers club in Cork. He was part of the team that beat St. Rynagh's in the 1973 All-Ireland club final. O'Doherty's club performances earned a call-up to the Cork senior hurling team, however, he was limited to just four National Hurling League appearances. He later claimed a second All-Ireland Club SHC medal after a defeat of Camross in 1977. O'Doherty was, once again, called up to the Cork senior team during this period.

== Honours ==
Limerick CBS

- Dr Croke Cup: 1964, 1966
- Dr Harty Cup: 1964, 1965, 1966

University College Cork

- Sigerson Cup: 1969, 1970
- Cork Senior Football Championship: 1969

Glen Rovers

- All-Ireland Senior Club Hurling Championship: 1973, 1977
- Munster Senior Club Hurling Championship: 1972, 1976
- Cork Senior Hurling Championship: 1972, 1976

Limerick

- Munster Minor Hurling Championship: 1965

Sporting positions
Preceded by Donal Hunt	Cork Senior Football Captain; 1970	Succeeded by Mick Scannell
