= 1992 All-Ireland Minor Football Championship =

Gaelic football competition

Championship details

All-Ireland Champions
- Winning team: Meath (3rd win)

All-Ireland Finalists
- Losing team: Armagh

Provincial Champions
- Munster: Cork
- Leinster: Meath
- Ulster: Armagh
- Connacht: Roscommon

The 1992 All-Ireland Minor Football Championship was the 61st staging of the All-Ireland Minor Football Championship, the Gaelic Athletic Association's premier inter-county Gaelic football tournament for boys under the age of 18.

Cork entered the championship as defending champions, however, they were defeated by Meath in the All-Ireland semi-final.

On 20 September 1992, Meath won the championship following a 2–5 to 0–10 defeat of Armagh in the All-Ireland final. This was their 3rd All-Ireland title overall and their first in two championship seasons.

== Results ==
=== Connacht Minor Football Championship ===
Preliminary Round

1992 Preliminary Round	Leitrim	0–3 – 2–9	Galway

Quarter-Final

1992 Quarter-Final	Mayo	1–13 – 1–5	Galway

Semi-Finals

28 June 1992 Semi-Final	Roscommon	2–11 – 3–7	Leitrim	Dr Hyde Park, Roscommon

5 July 1992 Semi-Final	Mayo	2–14 – 0–11	Sligo	McHale Park, Castlebar

Final

26 July 1992 Final	Roscommon	0–10 – 0–9	Mayo	McHale Park, Castlebar

=== Leinster Minor Football Championship ===
Preliminary Round

1992 Preliminary Round	Westmeath	2–18 – 0–2	Kilkenny	Nowlan Park, Kilkenny

1992 Preliminary Round	Meath	1–12 – 1–4	Laois	Páirc Tailteann, Navan

1992 Preliminary Round	Wicklow	1–10 – 0–5	Longford	Pearse Park, Longford

1992 Preliminary Round	Dublin	0–7 – 0–7	Offaly	O'Connor Park, Tullamore

Quarter-Finals

1992 Quarter-Final	Kildare	2–7 – 1–9	Wicklow	St Conleth's Park, Newbridge

1992 Quarter-Final	Carlow	1–9 – 2–9	Westmeath	Cusack Park, Mullingar

1992 Quarter-Final	Dublin	0–3 – 1–8	Wexford	Wexford Park, Wexford

Semi-Finals

1992 Semi-Final	Kildare	2–4 – 1–12	Westmeath	O'Connor Park, Tullamore

1992 Semi-Final	Meath	1–8 – 0–11	Wexford	Croke Park, Dublin

1992 Semi-Final Replay	Meath	3–10 – 2–10	Wexford	Croke Park, Dublin

Final

26 July 1992 Final	Meath	1–8 – 1–5	Westmeath	O'Connor Park, Tullamore

=== Munster Minor Football Championship ===
Quarter-Finals

1992 Quarter-Final	Clare	2–10 – 0–6	Waterford	Seán Treacy Park, Tipperary

1992 Quarter-Final	Kerry	1–15 – 1–5	Tipperary	Beaufort

Semi-Finals

1992 Semi-Final	Cork	6–11 – 2–7	Clare	FitzGerald Park, Kilmallock

1992 Semi-Final	Limerick	1–5 – 7–16	Kerry	Castleisland

Finals

19 July 1992 Final	Cork	0–11 – 0–11	Kerry	Gaelic Grounds, Limerick

26 July 1992 Final Replay	Cork	3–6 – 2–7	Kerry	Páirc Uí Chaoimh, Cork

=== Ulster Minor Football Championship ===
Quarter-Finals

1992 Quarter-Final	Tyrone	1–16 – 0–9	Derry	Celtic Park, Belfast

1992 Quarter-Final	Donegal	1–11 – 0–6	Cavan	Breffni Park, Cavan

1992 Quarter-Final	Fermanagh	1–6 – 1–5	Antrim	St. Molaise Park, Irvinestown

1992 Quarter-Final	Down	0–11 – 1–9	Armagh	Athletic Grounds, Armagh

Semi-Finals

1992 Semi-Final	Fermanagh	2–13 – 1–4	Donegal	Healy Park, Omagh

1992 Semi-Final	Armagh	3–12 – 1–8	Tyrone	Casement Park, Belfast

Final

19 July 1992 Final	Armagh	0–13 – 0–9	Donegal	St Tiernach's Park, Clones

=== All-Ireland Minor Football Championship ===
Semi-Finals

16 August 1992 Semi-Final	Armagh	3–12 – 0–13	Roscommon	Croke Park, Dublin

23 August 1992 Semi-Final	Meath	3–13 – 2–12	Cork	Croke Park, Dublin

Final

20 September 1992 Final	Meath	2–05 – 0–10	Armagh	Croke Park, Dublin
