= Eugene Sheelan =

Irish Gaelic footballer

Personal information
- Born: 1949
- Died: 27 August 2012 (aged 63) Wicklow, County Wicklow, Ireland
- Occupation: retired Garda

Sport
- Sport: Gaelic football
- Position: Midfield/Forward
Clubs
- Years: Club
- St Patrick's; Garda (Dublin); Civil Service (Dublin)
Inter-county
- Years: County
- 1969-1979: Louth

Eugene Sheelan (1949–2012) was an Irish Gaelic footballer who played as a Midfielder and Forward for the Louth senior team.

== Playing career ==
Sheelan made his senior inter-county debut in 1969 and for the next decade was a regular for Louth. In 1973 he scored a decisive goal as Louth defeated Dublin in a second round replay of the Leinster Senior Football Championship.

In Louth club football he lined out for his local team St Patrick's. Based in Dublin for work purposes, he eventually transferred to Garda before moving to the Civil Service club, where he would win a Dublin Senior Football Championship medal in 1980 alongside his Louth team-mate Benny Gaughran.

== Death ==
He died suddenly at his home in Glebemount, Wicklow on 27 August 2012. He was predeceased by his wife Josephine.

== Honours ==
- Leinster Under-21 Football Championship (1): 1970
- Louth Junior Football Championship (1): 1972
- Louth Junior A Football League (2): 1970, 1972
- Ranafast Cup (1): 1966
- Dublin Senior Football Championship (1): 1980
