= Donal Aherne =

Irish Gaelic footballer and coach

Donal (Dan) Aherne
Personal information
- Born: 1950 (age 75–76) Glanworth, County Cork, Ireland
- Occupation: Business coach

Sport
- Sport: Gaelic football
- Position: Midfield
Club
- Years: Club
- Glanworth
Club titles
- Cork titles: 5
Inter-county*
Years	County	Apps (scores)
1967-1973	Cork	1 (0-00)
Inter-county titles
- Munster titles: 1
- All-Irelands: 1
- NFL: 0
- All Stars: 0
- *Inter County team apps and scores correct as of 21:28, 18 December 2016.

Donal Aherne (born 1950) is an Irish retired Gaelic football coach and player. He had a brief league and championship career with the Cork senior team from 1971 until 1973.

== Career ==
Born in Glanworth, County Cork, Aherne first played competitive Gaelic football at underage levels with Glanworth. He won back-to-back county minor championship medals in 1966 and 1967, before claiming a county junior championship medal in 1971. Aherne also won a county intermediate championship medal in 1976.

Aherne made his debut on the inter-county scene when he was selected on the Cork minor team in 1967. He played in two championship seasons with the minors and collected back-to-back All-Ireland medals as captain. Aherne subsequently joined the Cork under-21 team, winning back-to-back All-Ireland medals in 1970 and 1971. He joined the Cork senior team in 1972. He was a member of the extended panel when the team won the All-Ireland title in 1973.

== Honours ==
Glanworth

- Cork Intermediate Football Championship: 1976
- Cork Junior Football Championship: 1971
- Cork Minor Football Championship: 1966, 1967

Cork

- All-Ireland Under-21 Football Championship: 1970, 1971
- Munster Under-21 Football Championship: 1969, 1970, 1971
- All-Ireland Minor Football Championship: 1967 (c), 1968 (c)
- Munster Minor Football Championship: 1967 (c), 1968 (c)

Achievements
Preceded by Séamus O'Dowd	All-Ireland Minor Football Final winning captain 1967-1968	Succeeded by Éamonn Fitzpatrick
