= 1976 Cork Senior Hurling Championship =

Annual hurling competition season

- Dates: 25 April – 3 October 1976
- Teams: 17
- Champions: Glen Rovers (24th title); Pat Barry (captain); Johnny Clifford (manager); Donie O'Donovan (manager)
- Runners-up: Blackrock; Ray Cummins (captain); Joe McGrath (manager)

Tournament statistics
- Matches played: 16
- Goals scored: 73 (4.56 per match)
- Points scored: 337 (21.06 per match)
- Top scorer(s): Tom Collins (5-08)

The 1976 Cork Senior Hurling Championship was the 88th staging of the Cork Senior Hurling Championship since its establishment by the Cork County Board in 1887. The championship began on 25 April 1976 and ended on 3 October 1976.

Blackrock entered the championship as the defending champions.

The final was played on 3 October 1976 at the newly opened Páirc Uí Chaoimh in Cork, between Glen Rovers and Blackrock, in what was their second consecutive meeting in the final. Glen Rovers won the match by 2–07 to 0–10 to claim their 24th championship title overall and a first title in four years.

Tom Collins was the championship's top scorer with 5-08.

== Team changes ==
=== To Championship ===
Promoted from the Cork Intermediate Hurling Championship

- Ballinhassig

=== From Championship ===
Regraded to the Cork Intermediate Hurling Championship

- St. Vincent's

== Results ==
=== First round ===
25 April 1976 First round	Mallow	0-09 - 1-10	Na Piarsaigh	Blarney
	Paddy Buckley 0-8, J Hayes 0-1.		J Sullivan 1-4, V Twomey 0-2, R McDonnell 0-2, J O'Sullivan 01-, J Gardiner 0-1.	Referee: D O'Connor (Bishopstown)

=== Second round ===
2 May 1976 Second round	Blackrock	6-13 - 3-08	Avondhu	Páirc Mac Gearailt
	D Collins 1-4, B Cummins 1-2, P Kavanagh 1-1, R Cummins 1-1, F Cummins 1-0, P Moylan 0-3, J Horgan 0-1, É O'Donoghue 0-1.		J Duane 1-3, J Buckley 1-1, D Relihan 1-1, D Herlihy 0-2, W Shanahan 0-1, J Keane 0-1.	Referee: J Motherway (Aghada)

8 May 1976 Second round	Seandún	3-15 - 4-09	University College Cork	The Mardyke
	P Meade 1-3, P O'Regan 1-2, M Keane 1-0, W Murphy 0-3, J McCarthy 0-3, P O'Sullivan 0-2, J Nodwell 0-2.		B Waldron 2-4, T Sullivan 1-2, J Higgins 1-1, D McGovern 0-1, W Veriker 0-1.	Referee: D Collins (Kinsale)

9 May 1976 Second round	Na Piarsaigh	0-09 - 3-10	St. Finbarr's	The Mardyke
	J O'Sullivan 0-4, R McDonnell 0-2, J Moynihan 0-1, T Kennefick 0-1, T Mullins 0-1.		J Barry-Murphy 1-2, C McCarthy 1-1, J O'Shea 1-0, S Gillen 0-3, É Fitzpatrick 0-2, J McCarthy 0-1, G McCarthy 0-1.	Referee: D O'Connell (Bishopstown)

9 May 1976 Second round	Youghal	1-07 - 3-15	Muskerry	Riverstown
	P Hegarty 1-0, R O'Sullivan 0-3, W Walsh 0-1, F Keane 0-1, S O'Leary 0-1, M Butler 0-1.		T Ryan 0-6, T Hourihane 1-2, T O'Mahony 1-2, P McDonnell 1-0, S Noonan 0-3, J Allen 0-1, P Connell 0-1.	Referee: W Horgan (Brian Dillons)

9 May 1976 Second round	Nemo Rangers	4-14 - 1-08	Imokilly	Riverstown
	B Morgan 1-7, N Morgan 2-3, J Cremin 1-0, D Allen 0-2, W Barry 0-1, J O'Leary 0-1.		J Murphy 1-1, M Ahern 0-3, F Wall 0-3, S Kearney 0-1.	Referee: O Twomey (Ballincollig)

9 May 1976 Second round	Carbery	1-11 - 2-06	Carrigdhoun	Ballinspittle
	K Kehilly 0-7, D Healy 1-3, G O'Sullivan 0-1.		G O'Sullivan 2-1, K O'Donovan 0-3, D O'Sullivan 0-1, D Cronin 0-1.	Referee: P Cronin (St. Finbarr's)

16 May 1976 Second round	Bandon	3-08 - 4-11	Sarsfields	Ballinhassig
	P Crowley 2-0, P O'Riordan 1-0, N Crowley 0-3, N Gallagher 0-2, R Wilmot 0-1, K O'Driscoll 0-1, J Gabriel 0-1.		T Murphy 2-3, B Óg Murphy 0-4, F O'Keeffe 1-0, P Riordan 1-0, R Fitzgerald 0-3, M Carroll 0-1.	Referee: D O'Connor (Bishopstown)

23 May 1976 Second round	Glen Rovers	1-17 - 1-10	Ballinhassig	Carrigaline Park
	T Collins 1-1, P Horgan 0-4, V Marshall 0-4, P O'Doherty 0-3, M Ryan 0-2, D Coughlan 0-1, P Harte 0-1, R Mahony 0-1.		D Coleman 0-6, B Coleman 1-1, T Hayes 0-1, J Reynolds 0-1, B Walsh 0-1.	Referee: P Cronin (St. Finbarr's)

=== Quarter-finals ===
5 June 1976 Quarter-final	St. Finbarr's	2-12 - 2-11	Muskerry	The Mardyke
	J Barry-Murphy 1-3, C McCarthy 0-6, S Looney 1-1, G McCarthy 0-1, C Roche 0-1.		T Ryan 0-6, S Noonan 1-1, T Hourihane 1-0, J Allen 0-3, J O'Leary 0-1.	Referee: W Horgan (Brian Dillons)

5 June 1976 Quarter-final	Glen Rovers	4-14 - 2-11	Sarsfields	The Mardyke
	T Collins 1-4, P Doherty 1-4, M Ryan 1-1, D Clifford 1-0, P Harte 0-2, R Crowley 0-1, V Marshall 0-1, JJ O'Neill 0-1.		T Murphy 1-1, B Óg Murphy 0-4, S Barrett 0-4, P Riordan 1-0, DJ Foley 0-1, B Cotter 0-1.	Referee: P Cronin (St. Finbarr's)

5 June 1976 Quarter-final	Seandún	2-17 - 1-01	Nemo Rangers	Church Road
	P O'Sullivan 1-2, K Keane 1-2, B Meade 0-4, W Murphy 0-2, J Crowley 0-2, P Regan 0-2, S Lucey 0-1, J Nodwell 0-1, E Murphy 0-1.		N Morgan 1-0, B Morgan 0-1.

6 June 1976 Quarter-final	Blackrock	3-14 - 3-04	Carbery	Cloughduv
	R Cummins 1-2, D Collins 1-2, J Murphy 0-5, B Cummins 1-0, P Moylan 0-3, É O'Donoghue 0-1, F Cummins 0-1.		T Crowley 1-2, D Healy 1-0, M O'Mahony 1-0, D Noonan 0-1, P Brennan 0-1.	Referee: M Keane (Cloughduv)

=== Semi-finals ===
20 August 1976 Semi-final	Glen Rovers	4-10 - 1-06	Seandún	Páirc Uí Chaoimh
	T Collins 3-3, P Harte 1-1, P Horgan 0-3, P Barry 0-1, JJ O'Neill 0-1, R Crowley 0-1.		J Quigley 1-0, J Nodwell 0-1, J McCarthy 0-1, K Keane 0-1, W Murphy 0-1, P O'Sullivan 0-1, B Meade 0-1.	Referee: P Cronin (St. Finbarr's)

21 August 1976 Semi-final	Blackrock	4-17 - 2-13	St. Finbarr's	Páirc Uí Chaoimh
	P Moylan 0-7, P Butler 2-0, É O'Donoghue 1-2, B Cummins 1-1, J Murphy 0-4, R Cummins 0-2, T Cashman 0-1.		J Barry-Murphy 0-4, S Looney 1-0, É Fitzpatrick 1-0, S Gillen 0-3, C Roche 0-2, C McCarthy 0-2, G McCarthy 0-1, G O'Shea 0-1.	Referee: W Horgan (Brian Dillons)

=== Final ===
3 October 1976 Final	Glen Rovers	2-07 - 0-10	Blackrock	Páirc Uí Chaoimh
	P Harte 2-2, D Clifford 0-1, P O'Doherty 0-1, P Horgan 0-1, R Crowley 0-1, M Ryan 0-1.		P Moylan 0-5, J Murphy 0-2, É O'Donoghue 0-1, P Kavanagh 0-1, B Cummins 0-1.	Attendance: 25,080; Referee: W Horgan (Cork)

== Championship statistics ==
=== Top scorers ===
Overall

Rank	Player	County	Tally	Total	Matches	Average
1	Tom Collins	Glen Rovers	5-08	23	4	5.75
2	Pat Moylan	Blackrock	0-18	18	4	4.50
3	Patsy Harte	Glen Rovers	3-06	15	4	3.75
4	Jimmy Barry-Murphy	St. Finbarr's	2-09	15	3	5.00
4	John Murphy	Blackrock	1-12	15	4	3.75
6	Tadhg Murphy	Sarsfields	3-04	13	2	6.50
6	Brendan Cummins	Blackrock	3-04	13	4	3.25
8	Noel Morgan	Nemo Rangers	3-03	12	2	6.00
8	Donie Collins	Blackrock	2-06	12	4	3.00
8	Charlie McCarthy	St. Finbarr's	1-09	12	3	4.00
8	Tomás Ryan	Muskerry	0-12	12	2	6.00

In a single game

Rank	Player	County	Tally	Total	Opposition
1	Tom Collins	Glen Rovers	3-03	12	Seandún
2	Brian Waldron	UCC	2-04	10	Seandún
2	Billy Morgan	Nemo Rangers	1-07	10	Imokilly
4	Noel Morgan	Nemo Rangers	2-03	9	Imokilly
4	Tadhg Murphy	Sarsfields	2-03	9	Bandon
6	Patsy Harte	Glen Rovers	2-02	8	Blackrock
6	Paddy Buckley	Mallow	0-08	8	Na Piarsaigh
8	G. O'Sullivan	Carrigdhoun	2-01	7	Carbery
8	Jim Sullivan	Na Piarsaigh	1-04	7	Mallow
8	Donie Collins	Blackrock	1-04	7	Avondhu
8	Tom Collins	Glen Rovers	1-04	7	Sarsfields
8	Pat O'Doherty	Glen Rovers	1-04	7	Sarsfields
8	Pat Moylan	Blackrock	0-07	7	St. Finbarr's
8	Kevin Kehilly	Carbery	0-07	7	Carrigdhoun

=== Miscellaneous ===
- On 20 August 1976, Glen Rovers defeated Seandún in the first senior championship game to take place at Páirc Uí Chaoimh.
- The final is played in Páirc Uí Chaoimh for the first time.
