= 1967 All-Ireland Minor Football Championship =

Gaelic football competition

Championship details

All-Ireland Champions
- Winning team: Cork (2nd win)
- Captain: Donal Aherne

All-Ireland Finalists
- Losing team: Laois

Provincial Champions
- Munster: Cork
- Leinster: Laois
- Ulster: Tyrone
- Connacht: Roscommon

The 1967 All-Ireland Minor Football Championship was the 36th staging of the All-Ireland Minor Football Championship, the Gaelic Athletic Association's premier inter-county Gaelic football tournament for boys under the age of 18.

Mayo entered the championship as defending champions, however, they were defeated by Roscommon in the Connacht final.

On 24 September 1967, Cork won the championship following a 5-14 to 2-3 defeat of Laois in the All-Ireland final. This was their second All-Ireland title overall and their first in six championship seasons.

== Results ==
=== Connacht Minor Football Championship ===
==== Connacht quarter-final ====
2 July 1967 Quarter-final	Mayo	5-03 - 0-05	Sligo	Fr. O'Hara Park, Charlestown
	P Glavey 3-0, A Kelly 1-0, J Smith 1-0, D Griffiths 0-1, S O'Grady 0-1, B O'Reilly 0-1.		D O'Connor 0-4, B Colleran 0-1.

==== Connacht semi-finals ====
7 July 1967 Semi-final	Leitrim	0-03 - 9-12	Roscommon	Páirc Seán Mac Diarmada, Carrick-on-Shannon
	T Faughnan 0-3.		S McHugh 4-3, C Doolan 2-3, P Shalloe 1-3, J O'Callaghan 1-1, B O'Hara 1-1, M Flanagan 0-1.

16 July 1967 Semi-final	Galway	1-04 - 2-10	Mayo	Tuam Stadium, Tuam
	A Conneely 1-0, T O'Malley 0-2, M McDonnell 0-2.		D Griffith 2-2, B O'Reilly 0-3, S O'Grady 0-2, T Cribbin 0-1, L Kelly 0-1, F Galvey 0-1.

==== Connacht final ====
30 July 1967 Final	Roscommon	2-05 - 1-05	Mayo	St Coman's Park, Roscommon
	M Flanagan 1-1, P Shalloe 0-4, C Doolan 1-0.		G Griffith 1-1, B Reilly 0-4.

=== Leinster Minor Football Championship ===
==== Leinster first round ====
7 May 1967 First round	Laois	7-11 - 2-01	Kilkenny	Geraldine Park, Athy
	S Allen 3-2, J Lalor 1-5, R Miller 2-0, S Furey 1-2, T Keane 0-1, A Purcell 0-1.		M Brennan 1-0, C Brennan 1-0, M Phelan 0-1.

==== Leinster second round ====
28 May 1967 Second round	Laois	5-09 - 2-01	Wexford	Dr. Cullen Park, Carlow
	S Allen 4-2, S Furey 1-2, J Lalor 0-2, T Keane 0-1, I Houlihan 0-1, S Fleming 0-1.		P Byrne 1-1, E Walsh 1-0.

==== Leinster quarter-finals ====
25 June 1967 Quarter-final	Longford	1-10 - 1-09	Kildare	Cusack Park, Mullingar
	F Farrell 1-7, K Hanniffy 0-2, S Lee 0-1.		P Hennessy 1-5, J Kelly 0-2, R Flanagan 0-1, V Donoghue 0-1.

25 June 1967 Quarter-final	Westmeath	1-05 - 4-07	Dublin	Cusack Park, Mullingar
	T Gunning 1-0, M Bannon 0-3, W Duggan 0-1, R Bradley 0-1.		N Redmond 3-0, B Lee 1-1, J Woodhead 0-3, K McConnell 0-1, M Fitzpatrick 0-1, T Martin 0-1.

25 June 1967 Quarter-final	Louth	1-10 - 0-13	Meath	Drogheda Park, Drogheda
	A McGrath 1-2, T Doherty 0-4, D Murray 0-2, R Barry 0-1, M McDonnell 0-1.

2 July 1967 Quarter-final	Laois	5-17 - 1-08	Offaly	Drogheda Park, Drogheda
	E Condron 2-2, J Rowlon 1-4, S Furey 1-2, S Allen 1-1, I Houlihan 0-4, B Miller 0-2, T Keane 0-1, S Fleming 0-1.		P Maguire 1-1, P Keegan 0-3, P Fleming 0-2, K Kilmurray 0-1, D Daly 0-1.

7 July 1967 Quarter-final replay	Meath	0-17 - 3-08 (aet)	Louth	Páirc Tailteann, Navan

12 July 1967 Quarter-final second replay	Meath	1-16 - 3-06	Louth	Croke Park, Dublin
	M Fay 0-6, J Donegan 1-2, A Burns 0-2, E Geraghty 0-2, B Cummins 0-2, D Cusack 0-1, D Connolly 0-1.		J McLoughlin 2-0, D Byrne 1-1, T Doherty 0-2, M McDonnell 0-2, D Murray 0-1.

==== Leinster semi-finals ====
20 July 1967 Semi-final	Laois	4-09 - 2-08	Longford	O'Connor Park, Tullamore
	T Keane 2-0, S Allen 1-1, J Lalor 0-4, S Furey 1-0, B Miller 0-2, I Houlihan 0-1, S Fleming 0-1.		F Farrell 1-2, S Lee 1-1, P Burke 0-3, TP Cassells 0-1, M Sheridan 0-1.

23 July 1967 Semi-final	Dublin	3-05 - 2-04	Meath	Croke Park, Dublin
	J Martin 1-1, V Daly 1-1, N Redmond 1-0, J Woodhead 0-3.		A Burns 1-1, J Dunnigan 1-0, M Fee 0-1, G Geraghty 0-1, D Connolly 0-1.

==== Leinster final ====
30 July 1967 Final	Laois	1-08 - 2-04	Dublin	Croke Park, Dublin
	J Lawlor 0-5, E Condron 1-0, H Fury 0-3.		N Redmond 1-0, K Hegarty 1-0, J Reilly 0-1, J Woodhead 0-1, V Daly 0-1, J Martin 0-1.

=== Munster Minor Football Championship ===
==== Munster quarter-finals ====
21 May 1967 Quarter-final	Clare	1-05 - 1-06	Waterford	Hennessy Memorial Park, Milltown Malbay

21 May 1967 Quarter-final	Limerick	0-01 - 2-10	Tipperary	Gaelic Grounds, Limerick
	S O'Connell 0-1.		S Downes 1-2, C Robinson 1-2, C O'Flaherty 0-5, P Coffey 0-1.

==== Munster semi-finals ====
23 June 1967 Semi-final	Cork	6-18 - 1-05	Waterford	Páirc Mac Gearailt, Fermoy
	D Morley 2-6, T O'Brien 3-1, D Long 1-3, D Hunt 0-3, J Barrett 0-2, E Kirby 0-2, D Cogan 0-1.		M Hickey 1-1, J Hearne 0-1, J O'Sullivan 0-1, P Phelan 0-1, J McDonnell 0-1.

4 July 1967 Semi-final	Tipperary	3-11 - 4-10	Kerry	Seán Treacy Park, Tipperary
	C O'Flaherty 0-8, P Downes 1-2, P O'Neill 1-1, J Tynan 1-0.		B Lynch 2-5, J Kenneally 2-1, M O'Donnell 0-3, S Hurley 0-1.

==== Munster final ====
16 July 1967 Final	Cork	2-08 - 0-03	Kerry	Cork Athletic Grounds, Cork
	D Hunt 1-2, D Long 1-0, D Morley 0-2, T O'Brien 0-1, J Barrett 0-1, E Kirby 0-1, C O'Sullivan 0-1.		B Lynch 0-1, M O'Donnell 0-1, J Bunyan 0-1.	Referee: M Slattery (Clare)

=== Ulster Minor Football Championship ===
==== Ulster preliminary round ====
1967 Preliminary round	Armagh	4-08 - 2-05	Mongahan	St. Mary's Park, Castleblaney

==== Ulster quarter-finals ====
1967 Quarter-final	Tyrone	4-16 - 0-04	Donegal	The Playing Fields, Lurgan

1967 Quarter-final	Derry	2-11 - 4-02	Antrim	Rossa Park, Magherafelt

1967 Quarter-final	Fermanagh	5-05 - 3-05	Cavan	St. Molaise Park, Irvinestown

1967 Quarter-final	Armagh	2-08 - 0-04	Down	The Playing Fields, Lurgan

==== Ulster semi-finals ====
1967 Semi-final	Tyrone	0-07 - 0-10	Derry	St. Tiernach's Park, Clones

1967 Semi-final	Fermanagh	1-11 - 0-11	Armagh	St. Molaise Park, Irvinestown

==== Ulster final ====
30 July 1967 Final	Tyrone	0-16 - 2-05	Fermanagh	St. Tiernach's Park, Clones
	E Morgan 0-8, P Park 0-5, J Donaghy 0-2, B McQuaid 0-1.		P McManus 1-2, F Roofe 1-0, E McParland 0-2, T O'Boyle 0-1.

=== All-Ireland Minor Football Championship ===
==== All-Ireland semi-finals ====
6 August 1967 Semi-final	Cork	3-06 - 0-07	Tyrone	Croke Park, Dublin
	T O'Brien 1-1, D Morley 1-1, E Kirby 1-0, J Barrett 0-2, D Cogan 0-2.		E Morgan 0-4, S Donaghy 0-1, P Garvey 0-1, B McQuaide 0-1.	Referee: J Martin (Roscommon)

20 August 1967 Semi-final	Laois	2-08 - 2-07	Roscommon	Croke Park, Dublin
	S FLeming 1-1, E Condron 1-0, J Lalor 0-3, S Furey 0-2, R Millar 0-1, S Allen 0-1.		P Shallow 1-4, J McHugh 1-1, W Morris 0-1, W O'Hara 0-1.	Attendance: P Devlin (Tyrone)

==== All-Ireland final ====
24 September 1967 Final	Cork	5-14 - 2-03	Laois	Croke Park, Dublin
	D Hunt 1-5, T O'Brien 2-0, D Ahern 1-1, D Morley 1-1, N Kirby 0-3, D Long 0-2, J Barrett 0-1, J Horgan 0-1.		E Condron 1-0, S Allen 1-0, J Lalor 0-2, L Houlihan 0-1.	Referee: P Devlin (Tyrone)

== Championship statistics ==
=== Miscellaneous ===
- Cork achieve the double for the first time in their history, after earlier winning the All-Ireland Minor Hurling Championship. Teddy O'Brien, Jimmy Barrett and Simon Murphy claim winners' medals in both All-Ireland victories.
