= Mickey Freyne =

Roscommon Gaelic footballer

Personal information
- Born: County Roscommon, Ireland

Sport
- Sport: Gaelic football
Club
- Years: Club
- Castlerea St Kevin's
Inter-county
- Years: County
- 1972 - ?: Roscommon
Inter-county titles
- Connacht titles: 4
- NFL: 1
- All Stars: 1

Mickey Freyne is a former GAA All Star Gaelic footballer from Castlerea, County Roscommon, Ireland. He played senior football for Roscommon and won an All Star in 1972. He played his club football with Castlerea St Kevins. Freyne made his debut with Roscommon during the 1972 season, where Roscommon won the Connacht Senior Football Championship, and went on to captain the team to their next championship win in 1977. He later won a National Football League medal in 1979.
