= 1969 All-Ireland Minor Football Championship =

Gaelic football competition

Championship details

All-Ireland Champions
- Winning team: Cork (4th win)

All-Ireland Finalists
- Losing team: Derry

Provincial Champions
- Munster: Cork
- Leinster: Wexford
- Ulster: Derry
- Connacht: Galway

The 1969 All-Ireland Minor Football Championship was the 38th staging of the All-Ireland Minor Football Championship, the Gaelic Athletic Association's premier inter-county Gaelic football tournament for boys under the age of 18.

Cork entered the championship as defending champions.

On 28 September 1969, Cork won the championship following a 2-7 to 0-11 defeat of Derry in the All-Ireland final. This was their fourth All-Ireland title overall and their third in succession.

== Results ==
=== Connacht Minor Football Championship ===
Quarter-final

1969 Quarter-final	Galway	1-11 – 0-05	Sligo	St. Comans Park, Roscommon

Semi-finals

1969 Semi-final	Mayo	2-14 – 2-04	Leitrim

1969 Semi-final	Roscommon	0-12 – 3-06	Galway	Pearse Stadium, Galway

Final

3 August 1969 Final	Mayo	3-03 – 0-08	Galway	MacHale Park, Castlebar

=== Munster Minor Football Championship ===
Quarter-finals

1969 Quarter-final	Clare	2-10 - 1-06	Limerick	Gaelic Grounds, Limerick

1969 Quarter-final	Tipperary	4-16 - 0-06	Waterford	Ned Hall Park, Clonmel

Semi-finals

1969 Semi-final	Cork	4-14 - 0-05	Clare	Cork Athletic Grounds, Cork

1969 Semi-final	Tipperary	0-03 - 3-14	Kerry	Ned Hall Park, Clonmel

Final

20 July 1969 Final	Cork	3-11 - 0-12	Kerry	Cork Athletic Grounds, Cork

=== Leinster Minor Football Championship ===
First round

1969 First round	Wexford	4-10 – 0-02	Kilkenny	O'Kennedy Park, New Ross

1969 First round	Wicklow	1-11 – 1-12	Carlow	Páirc Éanna, Gorey

Second round

1969 Second round	Louth	3-05 – 2-08	Westmeath	Páirc Tailteann, Navan

1969 Second round replay	Louth	3-09 – 2-08	Westmeath	Páirc Tailteann, Navan

1969 Second round	Wexford	3-07 – 0-09	Wicklow	O'Connor Park, Tullamore

Quarter-finals

1969 Quarter-final	Dublin	1-12 – 1-04	Laois	Dr Cullen Park, Carlow

1969 Quarter-final	Offaly	3-12 – 2-04	Louth	Croke Park, Dublin

1969 Quarter-final	Meath	1-10 – 1-08	Kildare	Maynooth

1969 Quarter-final	Wexford	1-12 – 0-09	Longford	Croke Park, Dublin

Semi-finals

1969 Semi-final	Dublin	1-12 – 2-06	Meath	Croke Park, Dublin

1969 Semi-final	Wexford	1-04 – 0-07	Offaly	Croke Park, Dublin

1969 Semi-final replay	Wexford	1-07 – 0-08	Offaly	Croke Park, Dublin

Final

27 July 1969 Final	Wexford	1-07 – 0-08	Dublin	Dr Cullen Park, Carlow

=== Ulster Minor Football Championship ===
Quarter-finals

1969 Quarter-final	Cavan	1-07 – 4-06	Monaghan	Breffni Park, Cavan

1969 Quarter-final	Tyrone	4-07 – 0-04	Monaghan	O'Neill Park, Irvinestown

1969 Quarter-final	Fermanagh	1-07 – 1-12	Antrim	St. Molaise Park, Irvinestown

Semi-finals

1969 Semi-final	Tyrone	2-07 – 0-10	Derry	St Tiernach's Park, Clones

1969 Semi-final	Derry	3-07 – 1-04	Antrim	Coalisland

Final

27 July 1969 Final	Derry	3-07 – 1-04	Tyrone	Casement Park, Belfast

=== All-Ireland Minor Football Championship ===
Semi-finals

10 August 1969 Semi-final	Cork	4-09 - 1-08	Galway	Croke Park, Dublin

31 August 1969 Semi-final	Derry	0-14 - 3-04	Wexford	Croke Park, Dublin
				Referee: T Cunningham (Galway)

Final

28 September 1969 Final	Cork	2-07 - 0-11	Derry	Croke Park, Dublin
	D Barron 2-0, S Courtney 0-4, PJ Lonergan 0-2, D Curran 0-1.		S Mullan 0-8, B Ward 0-1, M Moran 0-1, M O'Neill 0-1.	Referee: B Lowth (Dublin)

== Championship statistics ==
=== Miscellaneous ===
- Cork achieve the double for the second time in their history, after earlier winning the All-Ireland Minor Hurling Championship. They also become the second team after Dublin in 1956 to win three successive All-Ireland titles. Brian Murphy and Ger Hanley claim winners' medals in both All-Ireland victories.
