= 1966 All-Ireland Minor Football Championship =

Gaelic football competition

Championship details

All-Ireland Champions
- Winning team: Mayo (3rd win)

All-Ireland Finalists
- Losing team: Down

Provincial Champions
- Munster: Cork
- Leinster: Laois
- Ulster: Down
- Connacht: Mayo

The 1966 All-Ireland Minor Football Championship was the 35th staging of the All-Ireland Minor Football Championship, the Gaelic Athletic Association's premier inter-county Gaelic football tournament for boys under the age of 18.

Derry entered the championship as defending champions, however, they were defeated by Down in the Ulster final.

On 25 September 1966, Mayo won the championship following a 1–12 to 1–8 defeat of Down in the All-Ireland final. This was their third All-Ireland title overall and their first title in 13 championship seasons.

== Results ==
=== Connacht Minor Football Championship ===
Quarter-Final

1966 Quarter-Final	Leitrim	Lost – Won	Roscommon	St. Coman's Park, Roscommon

Semi-Finals

1966 Semi-Final	Mayo	4-01 – 0-07	Sligo	Markievicz Park, Sligo

1966 Semi-Final	Galway	Lost – Won	Roscommon	St. Coman's Park, Roscommon

Final

17 July 1966 Final	Mayo	1-09 – 0-07	Roscommon	MacHale Park, Castlebar

=== Leinster Minor Football Championship ===
Preliminary round

1966 Preliminary round	Kildare	2-12 – 1-01	Wicklow	Nowlan Park, Kilkenny

1966 Preliminary round	Wexford	3-12 – 0-07	Wicklow	Páirc Uí Shíocháin, Gorey

1966 Preliminary round	Carlow	3-06 – 1-05	Westmeath	St Conleth's Park, Newbridge

1966 Preliminary round	Longford	3-03 – 0-04	Louth	Páirc Tailteann, Navan

Quarter-Finals

1966 Quarter-Final	Meath	1-04 – 0-08	Wexford	Croke Park, Dublin

1966 Quarter-Final	Offaly	0-10 – 0-04	Kildare	O'Moore Park, Portlaoise

1966 Quarter-Final	Laois	4-10 – 0-07	Carlow	O'Moore Park, Portlaoise

1966 Quarter-Final	Dublin	4-02 – 3-09	Longford	O'Connor Park, Tullamore

Semi-Finals

1966 Semi-Final	Offaly	2-10 – 1-06	Longford	Páirc Tailteann, Navan

1966 Semi-Final	Wexford	3-01 – 2-05	Laois	St. Patrick's Park, Enniscorthy

Final

24 July 1966 Final	Laois	1-10 – 0-07	Offaly	Croke Park, Dublin

=== Ulster Minor Football Championship ===
Preliminary round

1966 Preliminary round	Tyrone	3-11 – 0-04	Cavan

Quarter-Finals

1966 Quarter-Final	Antrim	2-04 – 1-09	Cavan	O'Neill Park, Dungannon

1966 Quarter-Final	Tyrone	1-18 – 0-07	Armagh	Pairc Esler, Newry

1966 Quarter-Final	Derry	1-18 – 0-06	Donegal	St. Brendan's Park, Birr

Semi-Finals

1966 Semi-Final	Derry	1-09 – 1-07	Tyrone	Casement Park, Dungannon

1966 Semi-Final	Down	5-11 – 3-07	Cavan	O'Neill Park, Dungannon

Final

31 July 1966 Final	Down	1-12 – 1-09	Derry	Casement Park, Belfast

=== Munster Minor Football Championship ===
Quarter-Finals

1966 Quarter-Final	Cork	2-12 – 1-02	Clare	Cusack Park, Ennis

1966 Quarter-Final	Waterford	4-05 – 1-02	Tipperary	Fraher Field, Dungarvan

Semi-Finals

1966 Semi-Final	Cork	6-20 – 1-02	Limerick	Fitzgerald Stadium, Killarney

1966 Semi-Final	Kerry	4-12 – 0-06	Waterford	Fraher Field, Dungarvan

Final

17 July 1966 Final	Kerry	1-07 – 5-12	Cork	Fitzgerald Stadium, Killarney

=== All-Ireland Minor Football Championship ===
Semi-Finals

21 August 1966 Semi-Final	Mayo	5-06 - 2-06	Cork	Croke Park, Dublin

21 August 1966 Semi-Final	Laois	2-08 - 1-11	Down	Croke Park, Dublin

27 August 1966 Semi-Final Replay	Laois	2-04 - 3-08	Down	Páirc Tailteann, Navan

Final

25 September 1966 Final	Mayo	1-12 - 1-08	Down	Croke Park, Dublin
