= 1971 All-Ireland Under-21 Football Championship =

Thevinayakvvc struggle

Championship details

All-Ireland Champions
- Winning team: Cork (2nd win)
- Captain: Séamus Looney

All-Ireland Finalists
- Losing team: Fermanagh

Provincial Champions
- Munster: Cork
- Leinster: Offaly
- Ulster: Fermanagh
- Connacht: Mayo

The 1971 All-Ireland Under-21 Football Championship was the eighth staging of the All-Ireland Under-21 Football Championship since its establishment by the Gaelic Athletic Association in 1964.

Cork entered the championship as defending champions.

On 19 September 1971, Cork won the championship following a 3-10 to 0-3 defeat of Fermanagh in the All-Ireland final. This was their second All-Ireland title overall and their second in succession.

== Munster Under-21 Football Championship ==
=== Munster quarter-finals ===
23 May 1971 Quarter-final	Clare	2-04 - 3-14	Kerry	Páirc Uí Seancháin
	O Devitt 1-1, M O'Gorman 1-0, J McMahon 0-1, L Friel 0-1, S Moloney 0-1.		G Coffey 2-4, P Lynch 1-1, G Horan 0-4, J Power 0-3, M Tarpey 0-1, J Egan 0-1.

1 June 1971 Quarter-final	Tipperary	3-12 - 3-06	Limerick	Seán Treacy Park
	P O'Sullivan 1-4, C O'Flaherty 1-1, E Brennan 1-0, V O'Donnell 0-3, AB Kennedy 0-2, J Williams 0-1, M Hynes 0-1.		M Carroll 2-2, L Moloney 1-1, J Ryan 0-2, M Williams 0-1.

=== Munster semi-finals ===
6 July 1971 Semi-final	Tipperary	0-12 - 2-11	Waterford	Páirc Daibhín
	P Sullivan 0-6, C Flaherty 0-3, J Stapleton 0-2, J Williams 0-1.		J Ahearne 1-7, T Moore 0-4, J Walsh 1-0.

8 July 1971 Semi-final	Kerry	1-12 - 3-06	Cork	FitzGerald Stadium
	J Walsh 1-3, G Power 0-3, P Horan 0-2, J Egan 0-2, M O'Sullivan 0-2.		B Cogan 1-0, D Curran 1-0, D Murray 1-0, E Fitzpatrick 0-3, D Allen 0-2, D Barron 0-1.

4 August 1971 Semi-final replay	Cork	3-09 - 2-03	Kerry	Cork Athletic Grounds
			J Walsh 1-1, J Egan 1-0, P Horan 0-2.

=== Munster final ===
12 August 1971 Final	Cork	1-10 - 2-05	Waterford	Páirc Mac Gearailt

== All-Ireland Under-21 Football Championship ==
=== All-Ireland semi-finals ===
29 August 1971 Semi-final	Fermanagh	3-05 - 1-05	Offaly	St. Molaise Park
	B Reilly 2-1, G Gallagher 1-0, E Treacy 0-4.		F Grehan 1-3, P Fanning 0-1, T Clavin 0-1.

29 August 1971 Semi-final	Cork	4-11 - 0-05	Mayo	Cork Athletic Grounds
	B Daly 1-6, B Cogan 2-1, J Lynch 1-0, D Allen 0-2, T Murphy 0-2.		M Padden 0-2, N Moloney 0-1, S Kilbride 0-1, D Griffith 0-1.

=== All-Ireland final ===
19 September 1971 Final	Cork	3-10 - 0-03	Fermanagh	Croke Park
	B Cogan 2-0, D Barron 1-2, D Curran 0-3, B Daly 0-3, T Murphy 0-2.		E Treacy 0-2, P McGinnity 0-1.

== Statistics ==
- The All-Ireland semi-final between Fermanagh and Offaly remains their only championship meeting.
