= 1968 All-Ireland Minor Football Championship =

Gaelic football competition

Championship details

All-Ireland Champions
- Winning team: Cork (3rd win)
- Captain: Donal Aherne

All-Ireland Finalists
- Losing team: Sligo

Provincial Champions
- Munster: Cork
- Leinster: Dublin
- Ulster: Armagh
- Connacht: Sligo

The 1968 All-Ireland Minor Football Championship was the 37th staging of the All-Ireland Minor Football Championship, the Gaelic Athletic Association's premier inter-county Gaelic football tournament for boys under the age of 18.

Cork entered the championship as defending champions.

On 22 September 1968, Cork won the championship following a 3-5 to 1-10 defeat of Sligo in the All-Ireland final. This was their third All-Ireland title overall and their second in succession.

== Results ==
=== Connacht Minor Football Championship ===
Quarter-finals

1968 Quarter-final	Galway	1-09 – 2-06	Roscommon	Dunlo GAA Grounds, Ballinasloe

1968 Quarter-final replay	Galway	2-09 – 1-07	Roscommon	St. Comans Park, Roscommon

Semi-finals

7 July 1968 Semi-final	Mayo	3-05 – 1-07	Sligo	Markievicz Park, Sligo

1968 Semi-final	Leitrim	0-02 – 2-10	Galway	Markievicz Park, Sligo

Final

21 July 1968 Final	Sligo	1-08 – 0-07	Galway	MacHale Park, Castlebar

=== Munster Minor Football Championship ===
Preliminary round

1968 Preliminary round	Tipperary	2-10– 2-04	Waterford	Ned Hall Park, Clonmel

Quarter-finals

1968 Quarter-final	Cork	1-13– 1-10	Finbars

1968 Quarter-final	Clare	1-10 – 2-07	Waterford

1968 Quarter-final	Tipperary	3-11 – 1-06	Limerick	Seán Treacy Park, Tipperary

1968 Quarter-final replay	Clare	1-08 – 1-07	Waterford	Seán Treacy Park, Tipperary

Semi-finals

1968 Semi-final	Cork	3-08 – 1-06	Waterford	Fraher Field, Dungarvan

1968 Semi-final	Kerry	2-13 – 1-08	Tipperary	Austin Stack Park, Tralee

Final

14 July 1968 Final	Kerry	0-02 – 2-13	Cork	Fitzgerald Stadium, Killarney

=== Ulster Minor Football Championship ===
Quarter-finals

1968 Quarter-final	Derry	0-08 – 0-05	Antrim	Casement Park, Belfast

1968 Quarter-final	Tyrone	3-11 – 0-07	Donegal	Bundoran

1968 Quarter-final	Cavan	6-12 – 0-08	Fermanagh	Breffni Park, Cavan

Semi-finals

1968 Semi-final	Derry	0-07 – 1-04	Tyrone

1968 Semi-final	Armagh	1-10 – 1-07	Down	St Tiernach's Park, Clones

Final

28 July 1968 Final	Armagh	4-08 – 1-07	Derry	Casement Park, Belfast

=== Leinster Minor Football Championship ===
First round

1968 First round	Laois	3-14 – 3-06	Wexford	Dr Cullen Park, Carlow

1968 First round	Wicklow	4-03 – 4-05	Carlow	Geraldine Park, Athy

Second round

1968 Second round	Laois	8-16 – 0-07	Carlow	Geraldine Park, Athy

1968 Second round	Kildare	6-17 – 1-02	Kilkenny	St Conleth's Park, Newbridge

Quarter-finals

1968 Quarter-final	Meath	4-04 – 1-07	Westmeath	Croke Park, Dublin

1968 Quarter-final	Louth	2-09 – 1-07	Kildare	Croke Park, Dublin

1968 Quarter-final	Laois	2-09 – 1-06	Kildare

1968 Quarter-final	Dublin	1-10 – 0-12	Longford

Semi-finals

1968 Semi-final	Laois	3-07 – 2-09	Louth	Croke Park, Dublin

1968 Semi-final	Dublin	0-09 – 0-08	Meath	Páirc Tailteann, Navan

Final

21 July 1968 Final	Dublin	1-11 – 0-08	Laois	Croke Park, Dublin

=== All-Ireland Minor Football Championship ===
Semi-finals

4 August 1968 Semi-final	Cork	2-10 - 1-06	Dublin	Croke Park, Dublin
	A Murphy 1-8, D Ahern 1-0, D McCarthy 0-1, J Coleman 0-1.		V Daly 1-0, J Reilly 0-5, P Gogarty 0-1.	Referee: S McLoughlin (Galway)

18 August 1968 Semi-final	Sligo	1-06 - 1-03	Armagh	Croke Park, Dublin
	R Boland 1-1, R Sherlock 0-2, J Quinn 0-2, P Kearins 0-1.		M Murphy 1-1, P Loughran 0-1, M Maginn 0-1.	Attendance: J Dennigan (Cork)

Final

22 September 1968 Final	Cork	3-05 - 1-10	Sligo	Croke Park, Dublin
	J Coleman 1-1, F Twomey 1-0, B Cummins 1-0, A Murphy 0-2, B Murphy 0-1.		D Kearins 0-5, N Kelleher 1-0, H Quinn 0-3, R Henry 0-1, A Richardson 0-1.	Referee: L Maguire (Monaghan)

== Championship statistics ==
=== Miscellaneous ===
- Donal Aherne of Cork becomes the second player after Tyrone's Eddie Devlin to captain a team to two All-Ireland titles.
