= 1972 Cork Senior Hurling Championship =

Annual hurling competition season

- Dates: 7 April – 12 November 1972
- Teams: 17
- Champions: Glen Rovers (23rd title); Patsy Harte (captain)
- Runners-up: Youghal; Frank Cooper (captain)

Tournament statistics
- Matches played: 16
- Goals scored: 90 (5.63 per match)
- Points scored: 305 (19.06 per match)
- Top scorer(s): Patsy Harte (3-14)

The 1972 Cork Senior Hurling Championship was the 84th staging of the Cork Senior Hurling Championship since its establishment by the Cork County Board in 1887. The championship began on 7 April 1972 and ended on 12 November 1972.

Blackrock entered the championship as the defending champions, however, they were beaten by St. Finbarr's in the first round.

The final was played on 12 November 1972 at the Athletic Grounds in Cork, between Glen Rovers and Youghal, in what was their first ever meeting in the final. Glen Rovers won the match by 3–15 to 1–10 to claim their 23rd championship title overall and a first title in three years.

Patsy Harte from the Glen Rovers club was the championship's top scorer with 3–14.

== Team changes ==
=== To Championship ===
Promoted from the Cork Intermediate Hurling Championship

- Nemo Rangers

=== From Championship ===
Regraded to the Cork Intermediate Hurling Championship

- Cloyne

== Results ==
=== First round ===
19 August 1972 First round	St. Finbarr's	6-11 - 1-14	Blackrock	Cork Athletic Grounds
	M Archer 2-1, E Fitzpatrick 2-1, C McCarthy 1-4, J Barry-Murphy 1-0, G McCarthy 0-2, B Wylie 0-1, C Cullinane 0-1, S Gillen 0-1.		É O'Donoghue 1-4, P Moylan 0-6, D Collins 0-3, W Cronin 0-1.

=== Second round ===
7 April 1972 Second round	Na Piarsaigh	8-10 - 4-10	Duhallow	Bishop Casey Memorial Park
	P Buckley 4-0, S Twomey 1-6, D Sheehan 2-0, D Daly 1-0, T Mullins 0-3, V Twomey 0-1.		B Buckley 1-2, D Kenneally 1-1, D Burke 1-1, TD Cronin 1-0, T Cremin 0-2, B Daly 0-2, P Buckley 0-1, P O'Connor 0-1.	Referee: T O'Riordan (Mallow)

7 April 1972 Second round	Seandún	1-04 - 2-05	Imokilly	Riverstown
	J O'Sullivan 1-2, W Murphy 0-2.		M Sheehan 1-2, S O'Farrell 1-1, T Brown 0-1, P Barry 0-1, D Clifford 0-1.

30 April 1972 Second round	Youghal	4-11 - 2-11	Sarsfields	Clonmult Memorial Park
	F Cooper 2-0, R O'Sullivan 1-3, F Keane 1-1, S O'Leary 0-4, N Hogan 0-2, S Ring 0-1.		B Óg Murphy 1-6, P Cashman 1-0, R Fitzgerald 0-2, JJ Long 0-1, E Kelleher 0-1, P McEvoy 0-1.	Referee: D Twomey (Mitchelstown)

14 May 1972 Second round	Passage	2-08 - 4-14	Nemo Rangers	Carrigaline
	B Meade 0-5, J McCarthy 1-1, K Keane 1-0, G O'Sullivan 0-2.		D Allen 3-5, B Morgan 0-5, D Calnan 1-1, N Morgan 0-3.	Referee: D O'Brien (Cobh)

14 May 1972 Second round	Carbery	3-04 - 5-11	Glen Rovers	Ballinhassig
	R Crowley 1-3, P Harrington 1-1, B Nyhan 1-0.		P Harte 1-7, P Doherty 2-2, L McAuliffe 2-1, J O'Neill 0-1.	Referee: D Coleman (Ballinhassig)

14 May 1972 Second round	Carrigdhoun	5-10 - 3-09	St. Vincent's	Manning Park
	F Coleman 2-1, B Coleman 1-3, JK Coleman 1-2, T Fogarty 1-1, D Coleman 0-2, TF Hayes 0-1.		C O'Shea 2-1, D Linehan 0-4, J Russell 0-4, B O'Neill 1-0.	Referee: D O'Brien (Cobh)

28 May 1972 Second round	Muskerry	3-17 - 3-03	Avondhu	Cork Athletic Grounds
	C Kelly 2-4, T O'Mahony 0-6, M Malone 1-1, T Ryan 0-3, P Lucey 0-2, B Fitton 0-1.		D Fenton 2-0, E O'Sullivan 1-1, P Buckley 0-2.	Referee: P Cronin (St. Finbarr's)

17 September 1972 Second round	St. Finbarr's	4-15 - 2-05	University College Cork	Cork Athletic Grounds
	J Barry-Murphy 3-0, G McCarthy 0-5, C Cullinane 1-1, C McCarthy 0-4, C Roche 0-2, E Fitzpatrick 0-1, S Gillen 0-1, M Archer 0-1.		W Moore 1-0, N Coleman 1-0, J Buckley 0-2, J Collins 0-2, J O'Grady 0-1.	Referee: M Walsh (Mayfield)

=== Quarter-finals ===
11 June 1972 Quarter-final	Youghal	4-09 - 2-14	Imokilly	Castlemartyr
	W Doyle 1-1, N Hogan 1-1, P Hegarty 1-0, N Gallagher 1-0, S O'Leary 0-3, R Sullivan 0-3, F Cooper 0-1.		W Glavin 0-12, P Barry 1-1, S Farrell 1-0, M Sheehan 0-1.	Referee: P Murphy (Blackrock)

2 July 1972 Quarter-final	Nemo Rangers	2-15 - 4-02	Na Piarsaigh	Ballinlough
	D Calnan 0-8, N Morgan 2-1, D Allen 0-4, J Barrett 0-1, S Buckley 0-1.		S Twomey 2-1, B Joyce 1-1, P Buckley 1-0.	Referee: M Walsh (Mayfield)

20 August 1972 Quarter-final	Glen Rovers	4-06 - 2-11	Muskerry	Charlie Hurley Park
	L McAuliffe 2-1, P Doherty 1-1, JJ O'Neill 1-0, P Harte 0-2, M Corbett 0-1, S Kennefick 0-1.		T Ryan 0-6, M Malone 1-2, C Kelly 1-1, P Lucey 0-2.	Referee: P Cronin (St. Finbarr's)

1 October 1972 Quarter-final	St. Finbarr's	2-15 - 0-02	Carrigdhoun	Manning Park
	C McCarthy 1-4, M Archer 1-2, C Roche 0-3, S Gillen 0-2, J Barry-Murphy 0-2, G McCarthy 0-1, B Wylie 0-1.		T Fogarty 0-1, B Coleman 0-1.	Referee: D O'Brien (Cobh)

=== Semi-finals ===
10 September 1972 Semi-final	Youghal	2-13 - 3-08	Nemo Rangers	Páirc Séamus de Barra
	F Cooper 1-1, F Keane 1-1, S O'Leary 0-4, R O'Sullivan 0-3, N Horgan 0-2, W Doyle 0-2.		S Coughlan 1-2, S Buckley 1-1, D Allen 1-1, B Morgan 0-3, F Cogan 0-1.

29 October 1972 Semi-final	Glen Rovers	1-09 - 1-04	St. Finbarr's	Cork Athletic Grounds
	P Doherty 1-1, P Harte 0-4, JJ O'Neill 0-2, J Young 0-1, T Buckley 0-1.		J Barry-Murphy 1-0, S Gillen 0-2, B Wylie 0-1, C Roche 0-1.	Attendance: 9,397; Referee: F Murphy (Blackrock)

=== Final ===
12 November 1972 Final	Glen Rovers	3-15 - 1-10	Youghal	Cork Athletic Grounds
	T Buckley 1-5, P Harte 2-1, P Doherty 0-4, P Barry, T O'Brien, M Ryan, L McAuliffe and J O'Sullivan 0-1 each.		S O'Leary 0-5, F Cooper 1-0, N Gallagher 0-2, R O'Sullivan, W Doyle and N Hogan 0-1 each.	Attendance: 7,873; Referee: F Murphy (Blackrock)

== Championship statistics ==
=== Top scorers ===
Top scorers overall

Rank	Player	Club	Tally	Total	Matches	Average
1	Patsy Harte	Glen Rovers	3-14	23	4	5.75
2	Dinny Allen	Nemo Rangers	4-10	22	3	7.33
3	Pat O'Doherty	Glen Rovers	4-08	20	4	5.00
4	Charlie McCarthy	St. Finbarr's	2-12	18	4	4.50
5	Jimmy Barry-Murphy	St. Finbarr's	5-02	17	4	4.25
6	Seán Twomey	Na Piarsaigh	3-07	16	2	8.00
6	Seánie O'Leary	Youghal	0-16	16	4	4.00
8	Paul Buckley	Na Piarsaigh	5-00	15	2	7.50
8	Liam McAuliffe	Glen Rovers	4-03	15	4	3.75
10	Frank Cooper	Youghal	4-02	14	4	3.50
10	Connie Kelly	Muskerry	3-05	14	2	7.00

Top scorers in a single game

Rank	Player	Club	Tally	Total	Opposition
1	Dinny Allen	Nemo Rangers	3-05	14	Passage
2	Paul Buckley	Na Piarsaigh	4-00	12	Duhallow
2	Willie Glavin	Imokilly	0-12	12	Youghal
4	Connie Kelly	Muskerry	2-04	10	Avondhu
4	Patsy Harte	Glen Rovers	1-07	10	Carbery
6	Jimmy Barry-Murphy	St. Finbarr's	3-00	9	UCC
6	Bertie Óg Murphy	Sarsfields	1-06	9	Youghal
6	Seán Twomey	Na Piarsaigh	1-06	9	Duhallow
9	Pat O'Doherty	Glen Rovers	2-02	8	Carbery
9	Tom Buckley	Glen Rovers	1-05	8	Youghal
9	Dan Calnan	Nemo Rangers	0-08	8	Na Piarsaigh

=== Miscellaneous ===
- Youghal qualified for the final for the first time in their history.
