= 1970 All-Ireland Under-21 Football Championship =

Gaelic football competition

- Dates: 5 April - 4 October 1970
- Teams: 31
- Champions: Cork (1st title); Donal Hunt (captain)
- Runners-up: Fermanagh; Éamonn McPartland (captain)

Tournament statistics
- Matches played: 33
- Goals scored: 94 (2.85 per match)
- Points scored: 585 (17.73 per match)
- Top scorer(s): Mickey Freyne (1-17)

The 1970 All-Ireland Under-21 Football Championship was the seventh staging of the All-Ireland Under-21 Football Championship since its establishment by the Gaelic Athletic Association in 1964. The championship ran from 5 April to 4 October 1970.

Antrim entered the championship as defending champions, however, they were beaten by Derry in the Ulster quarter-final.

The All-Ireland final was played on 4 October 1970 at Croke Park in Dublin, between Cork and Fermanagh, in what was their first ever meeting in the final. Cork won the match by 2-11 to 0-09 to claim their first ever All-Ireland U21 title.

Roscommon's Mickey Freyne was the championship's top scorer with 1-17.

== Connacht Under-21 Football Championship ==
=== Connacht quarter-final ===
3 May 1970 Quarter-final	Roscommon	1-08 - 1-07	Sligo	Kilcoyne Park
	T Regan 1-1, M Flanagan 0-3, M McDermott 0-1, T Hunt 0-1, J Gavin 0-1, M Freyne 0-1.		J Noone 1-2, M Brennan 0-2, H Quinn 0-2, S Feeney 0-1.

=== Connacht semi-finals ===
3 May 1970 Semi-final	Mayo	1-08 - 0-05	Galway	Claremorris Grounds
	D Griffith 1-3, T O'Malley 0-2, P O'Grady 0-1, S Kilbride 0-1, T Holland 0-1.		G Dooley 0-3, J Hughes 0-1, F Rushe 0-1.

10 May 1970 Semi-final	Leitrim	1-05 - 2-14	Roscommon	Páirc Seán Mac Diarmada
	S Keegan 1-1, P Rourke 0-3, D Brennan 0-1.		M Freyne 1-8, M Flanagan 1-3, A Regan 0-2, M McDermott 0-1.

=== Connacht final ===
19 July 1970 Final	Roscommon	1-10 - 0-14	Mayo	Dr. Hyde Park
	M Freyne 0-8, B O'Hara 1-1, C Keaveney 0-1.		T Holland 0-4, T O'Malley 0-2, S O'Grady 0-2, A Kelly 0-2, M McIntyre 0-1, W Henry 0-1, D Griffiths 0-1, S O'Reilly 0-1.

== Leinster Under-21 Football Championship ==
=== Leinster first round ===
5 April 1970 First round	Carlow	2-05 - 0-11	Wicklow	Dr. Cullen Park
	L Foster 1-1, P Doyle 1-0, K Conway 0-3, E Ellis 0-1.		G O'Toole 0-3, J Simpson 0-3, M O'Toole 0-3, T Fortune 0-2.

5 April 1970 First round	Laois	1-07 - 3-07	Offaly	O'Moore Park
	T O'Brien 1-6, S Allen 0-1.		S Darby 1-2, R Gleeson 1-2, P Fenning 1-1, P Moran 0-2.

5 April 1970 First round	Westmeath	0-02 - 0-16	Longford	Cusack Park
	W Bray 0-1, D Hogan 0-1.		P Burke 0-8, F Sheridan 0-4, F Farrell 0-1, K Hanniffy 0-1, S Lee 0-1, TP Cashell 0-1.

19 April 1970 First round replay	Wicklow	1-09 - 2-08	Carlow	Aughrim County Ground
	J Simpson 1-2, M O'Toole 0-4, G Farrell 0-1, G O'Toole 0-1, P Carthy 0-1.		K Conway 1-2, T Geoghegan 1-2, P Doyle 0-2, T Moriarty 0-1, D Power 0-1.

=== Leinster quarter-finals ===
19 April 1970 Quarter-final	Louth	1-10 - 1-09	Dublin	Gaelic Grounds
	D Reid 0-5, D Lynch 1-1, Terry Doherty 0-2, M McDonald 0-1, R Barry 0-1.		P Leahy 0-4, K Hegarty 1-0, D Hickey 0-3, P O'Neill 0-1, V Daly 0-1.

3 May 1970 Quarter-final	Longford	1-07 - 1-10	Offaly	Cusack Park
	K Hanniffy 1-2, P Burke 0-4, K Higgins 0-1.		S Darby 0-5, F Grehan 1-1, P Fenning 0-1, C Dunne 0-1, R Gleeson 0-1, S Lowry 0-1.

3 May 1970 Quarter-final	Wexford	8-08 - 0-06	Carlow	Páirc Uí Shíocháin
	L Bent 2-4, M Molloy 2-1, D Carthy 2-0, L Byrne 1-2, W French 1-1.		W Cullen 0-2, L Foster 0-1, E Ellis 0-1, J Sheerin 0-1, T Moriarty 0-1.

27 May 1970 Quarter-final	Meath	1-09 - 1-09	Kildare	Drumree Road
	M Costello 1-1, E Mulvihill 0-3, A Burns 0-2, M Fay 0-1, K Rennicks 0-1, B Blighe 0-1.		J Reilly 1-1, K Connolly 0-4, D Flanagan 0-2, J Balfe 0-1, A Comerford 0-1.

24 June 1970 Quarter-final replay	Meath	0-11 - 2-12	Kildare	Páirc Mhuire
				Referee: D Guerin (Dublin)

=== Leinster semi-finals ===
9 July 1970 Semi-final	Louth	2-08 - 1-09	Kildare	Páirc Tailteann
	A McGrath 1-2, J Byrne 1-2, D Reid 0-2, R Brennan 0-1, R Barry 0-1.		J Goulding 0-6, K Connolly 1-0, J Kelly 0-2, D Flanagan 0-1.

26 July 1970 Semi-final	Offaly	3-08 - 2-08	Wexford	Croke Park
	C Dunne 2-0, F Grehan 0-4, M Quirke 1-0, S Darby 0-3, V Smith 0-1.		P Cullen 1-1, M Kehoe 1-1, J Dunphy 0-4, D Carthy 0-1, G Howlin 0-1.

=== Leinster final ===
2 August 1970	Louth	2-13 - 3-09	Offaly	Croke Park
	D Reid 1-4, R Barry 1-3, E Sheelan 0-2, A McGrath 0-2, T Doherty 0-1, J Boylan 0-1.		F Grehan 1-3, D Murphy 1-2, M Connor 1-0, S Darby 0-2, L Hanlon 0-1, K Malone 0-1.	Referee: R Barry (Meath)

GK	1	Paddy Bird (Naomh Mhuire)
RCB	2	Paddy Oliver (St Patrick's)
FB	3	Terry Lennon (St Bride's) (c)
LCB	4	Gerry Carroll (St Patrick's)
RHB	5	Davy Byrne (Newtown Blues)
CHB	6	Gerry Sheridan (Glyde Rangers)
LHB	7	Jack Curran (Dowdallshill)
MF	8	John Boylan (St Kevin's)
MF	9	Eugene Sheelan (St Patrick's)
RHF	10	Richie Barry (Dowdallshill)
CHF	11	Denis Lynch (Oliver Plunketts)
LHF	12	Terry Doherty (Dundalk Gaels)
RCF	13	Damien Reid (Mattock Rangers)
FF	14	Richie Brennan (Glyde Rangers)
LCF	15	Alo McGrath (Cooley Kickhams)
Substitutes:
	16	Larry Muckian (Clan na Gael) for Lynch
	17	Pat Murphy (St Patrick's) for Doherty
	18	Peter Lennon (St Bride's) for Muckian

GK	1	Gerry McGee (Tullamore)
RCB	2	Liam Pender (Edenderry)
FB	3	Jackie Egan (Doon)
LCB	4	Pádraig Horan (St Rynagh's)
RHB	5	Seán Lowry (Ferbane)
CHB	6	Christy Dunne (Edenderry)
LHB	7	Ollie Daly (Ballycumber)
MF	8	Kieran Claffey (Doon)
MF	9	Murt Connor (Éire Óg)
RHF	10	Daithí Murphy (Gracefield)
CHF	11	Paddy Fenning (Tullamore) (c)
LHF	12	Freddie Grehan (Edenderry)
RCF	13	Séamus Darby (Rhode)
FF	14	Kevin Malone (Rhode)
LCF	15	Steve Coughlan (Tullamore)
Substitutes:
	16	Liam Hanlon (Daingean) for Daly
	17	Mick Currams (Na Piarsaigh) for Coughlan
	18	Mick Slattery (Éire Óg) for Darby

== Munster Under-21 Football Championship ==
=== Munster quarter-finals ===
5 April 1970 Quarter-final	Tipperary	0-04 - 2-10	Kerry	St. Ailbe's Park
	C O'Flaherty 0-2, P Coffey 0-1, P O'Sullivan 0-1.		P Lynch 0-5, B Lynch 0-4, J Galwey 1-1, M Moran 1-0.

12 April 1970 Quarter-final	Limerick	0-08 - 1-05	Waterford	FitzGerald Park
	C Cregan 0-3, S Bourke 0-2, P Geoghegan 0-2, D Enright 0-1.		J Murphy 1-0, S Fitzgerald 0-2, T Doyle 0-1, J Flynn 0-1, P Morrissey 0-1.	Referee: D Twomey (Cork)

31 May 1970 Quarter-final replay	Waterford	2-09 - 3-08	Limerick	Fraher Field
	P Morrissey 1-2, M Coffey 1-1, T Power 0-3, S Fitzgerald 0-2, T Doyle 0-1.		S Burke 2-0, J Landers 1-0, D Geoghegan 0-3, C Cregan 0-3, D Holmes 0-1, P Ryan 0-1.

=== Munster semi-finals ===
12 July 1970 Semi-final	Clare	1-10 - 0-08	Limerick	MacDonagh Park
	J Hehir 1-4, L Friel 0-2, M Tubridy 0-1, S Moloney 0-1, E Mescall 0-1, P Friel 0-1.		D Geoghegan 0-4, J Heddigan 0-2, J Martin 0-1, D Holmes 0-1.

15 July 1970 Semi-final	Cork	2-13 - 0-10	Kerry	Cork Athletic Grounds
	J Barrett 2-1, D Long 0-5, T O'Brien 0-3, N Kirby 0-2, D Hunt 0-1, D Barron 0-1.		B Lynch 0-6, N O'Sullivan 0-2, P O'Connell 0-1, M O'Donnell 0-1.	Referee: S Moloney (Tipperary)

=== Munster final ===
23 August 1970 Final	Cork	5-12 - 1-07	Clare	Fr. Con Buckley Park
	J Coleman 2-1, N Kirby 1-2, T O'Brien 0-5, J Barrett 1-1, D Hunt 1-0, T Murphy 0-2, D Barron 0-1.		S Moloney 1-3, P Friel 0-3, E Mescall 0-1.	Referee: S Moloney (Tipperary)

== Ulster Under-21 Football Championship ==
=== Ulster preliminary round ===
24 May 1970 Preliminary round	Antrim	4-11 - 0-04	Monaghan	Casement Park
	G McCann 1-3, A Hamill 1-2, R Graffin 1-2, A McCallin 1-0, B Rainey 0-3, B Storie 0-1.		E Donnelly 0-2, M Quinn 0-1, D Beatty 0-1.

=== Ulster quarter-finals ===
17 May 1970 Quarter-final	Cavan	4-06 - 2-10	Armagh	Breffni Park
	G Cusack 2-1, O Leddy 1-2, M Galligan 1-0, J Brown 0-1, T Corcoran 0-1, T O'Reilly 0-1.		P Loughran 1-3, L McCabe 1-1, J Smith 0-2, C Sweeney 0-2, G Hart 0-2.

24 May 1970 Quarter-final	Tyrone	2-10 - 2-05	Down	Fr. Peter Campbell Park
	F Daly 1-1, P Park 0-4, T Donnelly 1-0, E Morgan 0-2, N Barbour 0-1, W Martin 0-1, S Donaghy 0-1.		P Rooney 1-2, E Grant 1-1, J Swail 0-1, E Tomelty 0-1.

24 May 1970 Quarter-final	Donegal	1-04 - 1-11	Fermanagh	MacCumhaill Park
	S Driscoll 1-0, T Bradley 0-2, M Carney 0-2.		E Treacy 1-1, A Campbell 0-3, T Boyle 0-2, P McGinnity 0-2, D McKenna 0-1, T McGrath 0-1, S Sheridan 0-1.

14 June 1970 Quarter-final	Derry	2-07 - 1-08	Antrim	Rossa Park
	B Gormley 1-1, J O'Leary 0-4, H Niblock 1-0, P Doherty 0-1, B Ward 0-1.		G Gillon 1-0, A McCallin 0-3, P Storie 0-2, T Dunlop 0-2, G McCann 0-1.

=== Ulster semi-finals ===
14 June 1970 Semi-final	Cavan	1-15 - 3-07	Tyrone	Breffni Park
	G Cusack 0-8, P O'Reilly 1-3, S McGuigan 0-2, J Brown 0-1, F Donnelly 0-1.		T Donnelly 2-2, N Barbour 1-0, P Park 0-2, F Daly 0-1, L Kelly 0-1, J McCarroll 0-1.

21 June 1970 Semi-final	Fermanagh	2-09 - 1-10	Derry	St. Molaise Park
	E Treacy 1-2, E McPartland 0-4, A Campbell 1-0, P McGinnity 0-3.		G Forrest 1-2, JJ Rocks 0-2, M Moran 0-1, B Gormley 0-1, A McGurk 0-1, C Mullan 0-1, H Niblock 0-1, P Doherty 0-1.

=== Ulster final ===
19 July 1970 Final	Fermanagh	0-13 - 0-08	Cavan	St. Tiernach's Park
	E Tracey 0-5, E McPartland 0-2, G Gallagher 0-2, P McGinnity 0-2, D McKenna 0-1, D Campbell 0-1.		S O'Reilly 0-3, G Cusack 0-2, M Hanna 0-1, S McGuigan 0-1, J Browne 0-1.	Referee: J Greene (Antrim)

== All-Ireland Under-21 Football Championship ==
=== All-Ireland semi-finals ===
30 August 1970 Semi-final	Louth	1-05 - 1-08	Fermanagh	St Brigid's Park
	E Sheelan 1-1, D Reid 0-3, T Lennon 0-1.		E McParland 1-2, A Campbell 0-3, E Treacy 0-1, D Campbell 0-1, C Campbell 0-1.	Referee: P Rooney (Down)

30 August 1970 Semi-final	Mayo	1-13 - 1-15	Cork	MacHale Park
	D Griffith 1-3, D Holland 0-5, D Dolan 0-2, T O'Malley 0-1, B O'Reilly 0-1, M McIntyre 0-1.		D Hunt 0-6, D Barron 1-1, T O'Brien 0-2, T Murphy 0-2, D Long 0-2, D Aherne 0-1, N Kirby 0-1.	Referee: F Tierney (Cavan)

=== All-Ireland final ===
4 October 1970 Final	Cork	2-11 - 0-09	Fermanagh	Croke Park
	T O'Brien 1-5, N Kirby 1-2, J Coleman 0-2, D Long 0-1, D Hunt 0-1.		E Treacy 0-3, E McPartland 0-3, D McKenna 0-1, P McGinnity 0-1, D Campbell 0-1.	Referee: P Kelly (Dublin)

== Statistics ==
=== Top scorers ===
Rank	Player	County	Tally	Total	Matches	Average
1	Mickey Freyne	Roscommon	1-17	20	3	6.66
2	Eugene Treacy	Fermanagh	2-12	18	5	3.60
2	Teddy O'Brien	Cork	1-15	18	4	4.50
4	Gene Cusack	Cavan	2-11	17	3	5.66
4	Damien Reid	Louth	1-14	17	4	4.25
6	Freddie Grehan	Offaly	2-08	14	3	4.66
6	Éamonn McPartland	Fermanagh	1-11	14	4	3.50
8	Ned Kirby	Cork	2-07	13	4	3.25
8	Des Griffith	Mayo	2-07	13	3	4.33
8	Séamus Darby	Offaly	1-10	13	3	4.33

=== Miscellaneous ===
- In the provincial championships there were a number of firsts as Fermanagh and Louth won the respective Ulster and Leinster titles for the first time in their history.
- The All-Ireland semi-final between Louth and Fermanagh remains their only championship meeting.
