= Munster Minor Football Championship =

Gaelic football tournament

- Founded: 1928
- Region: Munster (GAA)
- No. of teams: 6
- Title holders: Cork (32nd title)
- Most titles: Kerry (52 titles)
- Official website: www.munster.gaa.ie

The Munster Minor Football Championship is an annual Gaelic football competition organised by the Munster Council of the Gaelic Athletic Association since 1928 for the youngest competitors (under-18) in the province of Munster in Ireland. It is currently sponsored by Electric Ireland and therefore officially known as the Electric Ireland Munster GAA Football Minor Championship.

The series of games are played during the summer months with the Munster final currently being played on the second Sunday in July. The minor final provides the curtain-raiser to the senior final. The winning team is presented with the Tadhg Crowley Cup. This was presented by Munster Council in 1990 to commemorate Tadhg Crowley, who was elected as Munster Council Treasurer in 1968 and served until his death in December 1989. The championship had always been played on a straight knockout basis whereby once a team lost they are eliminated from the series; however, in recent years the championship has expanded to include a first-round losers' group.

The Munster Championship is an integral part of the wider All-Ireland Minor Football Championship. The winners of the Munster final, like their counterparts in the other provincial championships, are rewarded by advancing to the quarter-final stage of the All-Ireland series of games. The losers of the Munster final also enter the All-Ireland series at the quarter-final stage.

== Top winners ==
	County	Won	Years won	Runner-up	Years runner-up
1	Kerry	52	1931, 1932, 1933, 1936, 1937, 1938, 1940, 1941, 1945, 1946, 1947, 1948, 1949, 1950, 1951, 1954, 1957, 1958, 1962, 1963, 1965, 1970, 1975, 1978, 1979, 1980, 1982, 1988, 1989, 1990, 1994, 1996, 1997, 1998, 2001, 2002, 2003, 2004, 2006, 2008, 2009, 2013, 2014, 2015, 2016, 2017, 2018, 2019, 2020, 2023, 2024, 2025,	30	1939, 1955, 1956, 1959, 1960, 1966, 1967, 1968, 1969, 1971, 1972, 1973, 1974, 1976, 1977, 1981, 1984, 1985, 1986, 1987, 1991, 1992, 1999, 2000, 2005, 2007, 2010, 2012, 2022, 2026
2	Cork	32	1939, 1952, 1959, 1960, 1961, 1964, 1966, 1967, 1968, 1969, 1971, 1972, 1973, 1974, 1976, 1977, 1981, 1983, 1985, 1986, 1987, 1991, 1992, 1993, 1999, 2000, 2005, 2007, 2010, 2021, 2022, 2026	36	1932, 1933, 1935, 1938, 1945, 1947, 1948, 1949, 1951, 1953, 1954, 1957, 1962, 1963, 1965, 1970, 1975, 1978, 1979, 1980, 1982, 1988, 1989, 1990, 1995, 1996, 2001, 2003, 2004, 2011, 2014, 2016, 2019, 2023, 2024, 2025,
3	Tipperary	7	1934, 1935, 1955, 1984, 1995, 2011, 2012	12	1930, 1931, 1936, 1946, 1983, 1993, 2002, 2006, 2008, 2009, 2013, 2015
4	Clare	3	1929, 1930, 1953	9	1937, 1940, 1952, 1961, 1964, 1994, 2017, 2018, 2020
5	Limerick	1	1956	4	1950, 1997, 1998, 2021
6	Waterford	0		4	1929, 1934, 1941, 1958

== List of finals ==
All-Ireland champions
All-Ireland runners-up

Year	Winners	Score	Runners-up	Score	Venue	Winning Captain
1929	Clare	1–06 (9)	Waterford	0–04 (4)		George Comerford
1930	Clare	2–03 (9)	Tipperary	1–03 (6)	Gaelic Grounds	
1931	Kerry	3–06 (15)	Tipperary	0–07 (7)	Tralee	Jimmy O'Gorman
1932	Kerry	4–05 (17)	Cork	2–05 (11)	Clonakilty	Charlie O'Sullivan
1933	Kerry	2–09 (15)	Cork	3–04 (13)	Macroom	
1934	Tipperary	3–10 (19)	Waterford	0–05 (5)	Walsh Park	Andy Greensmith
1935	Tipperary	3–05 (14)	Cork	0–04 (4)	Fermoy	Dick Power
1936	Kerry	1–05 (8)	Tipperary	1–02 (5)	Gaelic Grounds	Tom "Gega" O'Connor
1937	Kerry	3–08 (17)	Clare	1–02 (5)		
1938	Kerry	8–09 (33)	Cork	1–02 (5)	Clonakilty	D. Rice
1939	Cork	3–03 (12)	Kerry	3–02 (11)	Clonmel	Paddy O Grady
1940	Kerry	1–03 (6)	Clare	1–02 (5)		
1941	Kerry	7–05 (26)	Waterford	2–01 (7)		
1942	No Championship					
1943	No Championship					
1944	No Championship					
1945	Kerry	2–04 (10)	Cork	2–03 (9)	Fitzgerald Stadium	
1946	Kerry	4–17 (29)	Tipperary	0–02 (2)	Fitzgerald Stadium	Tom Moriarty
1947	Kerry	0–07 (7)	Cork	1–03 (6)	Cork Athletic Grounds	
1948	Kerry	3–04 (13)	Cork	1–05 (8)	Fitzgerald Stadium	
1949	Kerry	0–07 (7)	Cork	0–05 (5)	Gaelic Grounds	Jerry Moriarty
1950	Kerry	4–10 (22)	Limerick	1–05 (8)		Mick Brosnan
1951	Kerry	0–07 (7)	Cork	0–03 (3)	Fitzgerald Stadium	
1952	Cork	3–09 (18)	Clare	1–01 (4)	Cork Athletic Grounds	Dick Cronin
1953	Clare	0–07 (7)	Cork	0–02 (2)	Fitzgerald Stadium	
1954	Kerry	4–10 (22)	Cork	1–03 (6)	Cork Athletic Grounds	
1955	Tipperary	0–09 (9) 0–09 (9) (R)	Kerry	1–06 (9) 1–05 (8) (R)	Fitzgerald Stadium, Semple Stadium	Liam Boland
1956	Limerick	1–07 (10)	Kerry	1–05 (8)		Eamonn O'Connor
1957	Kerry	1–05 (8)	Cork	0–05 (5)	Semple Stadium	
1958	Kerry	3–11 (20)	Waterford	0–04 (4)		Dave Geaney
1959	Cork	2–07 (13)	Kerry	0–07 (7)	Fitzgerald Stadium	Patsy Harte
1960	Cork	3–08 (17)	Kerry	0–07 (7)	Cork Athletic Grounds	Jim Travers
1961	Cork	2–12 (18)	Clare	0–02 (2)	Cork Athletic Grounds	Ned Coughlan
1962	Kerry	2–09 (15)	Cork	0–09 (9)	Cork Athletic Grounds	Jimmy O'Mahony
1963	Kerry	0–11 (11)	Cork	0–04 (4)	Cork Athletic Grounds	
1964	Cork	4–11 (23)	Clare	0–05 (5)	Cork Athletic Grounds	Con Roche
1965	Kerry	3–11 (20)	Cork	1–05 (8)	Gaelic Grounds	
1966	Cork	5–12 (27)	Kerry	1–07 (10)	Fitzgerald Stadium	
1967	Cork	2–08 (14)	Kerry	0–03 (3)	Cork Athletic Grounds	Donal Aherne
1968	Cork	2–13 (19)	Kerry	0–02 (2)	Fitzgerald Stadium	Donal Aherne
1969	Cork	3–11 (20)	Kerry	0–12 (12)	Cork Athletic Grounds	Eamonn Fitzpatrick
1970	Kerry	4–09 (21)	Cork	1–11 (14)	Fitzgerald Stadium	Ger Power
1971	Cork	2–13 (19)	Kerry	1–02 (5)	Cork Athletic Grounds	
1972	Cork	2–14 (20)	Kerry	1–14 (27)	Fitzgerald Stadium	Gerard Aherne
1973	Cork	1–13 (16)	Kerry	3–05 (14)	Cork Athletic Grounds	
1974	Cork	0–13 (13)	Kerry	1–06 (9)	Fitzgerald Stadium	Gene Desmond
1975	Kerry	3–07 (16)	Cork	1–11 (14)	Fitzgerald Stadium	Robert Bunyan
1976	Cork	0–10 (10)	Kerry	1–05 (8)	Páirc Uí Chaoimh	John Cremin
1977	Cork	1–07 (10)	Kerry	1–03 (6)	Páirc Uí Chaoimh	Liam Hedderman
1978	Kerry	1–04 (7)	Cork	0–06 (6)	Páirc Uí Chaoimh	Michael F. O'Shea
1979	Kerry	3–06 (15) 1–11 (14)	Cork	2–09 (15) 1–05 (8)	Fitzgerald Stadium Replay Páirc Uí Chaoimh	John Chute
1980	Kerry	1–12 (15)	Cork	1–10 (13)	Páirc Uí Chaoimh	Michael McAuliffe
1981	Cork	0–9 (9)	Kerry	1–5 (8)	Fitzgerald Stadium	Vivian Hedderman
1982	Kerry	1–11 (14)	Cork	0–05 (8)	Páirc Uí Chaoimh	
1983	Cork	1–11 (14)	Tipperary	1–05 (8)	Páirc Uí Chaoimh	Mick Slocum
1984	Tipperary	2–03 (9)	Kerry	0–08 (8)	Fitzgerald Stadium	Frank Howlin
1985	Cork	1–08 (11)	Kerry	0–04 (4)	Páirc Uí Chaoimh	Kevin Keily
1986	Cork	2–12 (18)	Kerry	0–04 (4)	Fitzgerald Stadium	Fintan Corrigan
1987	Cork	0–08 (8), 0–12 (12)	Kerry	0–08 (8), 1–08 (11)	Páirc Uí Chaoimh Replay – Fitzgerald Stadium	Noel Twomey
1988	Kerry	1–08 (11)	Cork	0–10 (10)	Páirc Uí Chaoimh	Peter Linehan
1989	Kerry	2–10 (16)	Cork	2–09 (15)	Fitzgerald Stadium	Billy O'Sullivan
1990	Kerry	1–10 (13)	Cork	0–03 (3)	Páirc Uí Chaoimh	Owen Joy
1991	Cork	0–10 (10)	Kerry	0–08 (8)	Fitzgerald Stadium	Alan McCarthy
1992	Cork	0–11 (11), 3–06 (15)	Kerry	2–05 (11), 2–07 (13)	Gaelic Grounds Páirc Uí Chaoimh	Kevin Harrington
1993	Cork	2–15 (21)	Tipperary	2–07 (13)	Semple Stadium	Conor O'Brien
1994	Kerry	2-11 (17)	Clare	3-5 (14)	Páirc Uí Chaoimh	Jack Ferriter
1995	Tipperary	2–06 (12)	Cork	0–10 (10)	Fitzgerald Stadium	Mark O'Shea
1996	Kerry	3–09 (18)	Cork	2–06 (12)	Páirc Uí Chaoimh	John Lynch
1997	Kerry	4–12 (24)	Limerick	1–07 (10)	Gaelic Grounds	Paul McCarthy
1998	Kerry	2-11 (17)	Limerick	0-8 (8)	Semple Stadium	Eugene Courtney
1999	Cork	2–16 (22)	Kerry	1–08 (11)	Páirc Uí Chaoimh	Paddy O'Shea
2000	Cork	1–13 (16)	Kerry	0–14 (14)	Gaelic Grounds	James Masters
2001	Kerry	0–15 (15)	Cork	0–12 (12)	Páirc Uí Chaoimh	Declan O'Sullivan
2002	Kerry	3–16 (25)	Tipperary	2–06 (12)	Semple Stadium	Bryan Sheehan
2003	Kerry	1–14 (17)	Cork	0–10 (10)	Fitzgerald Stadium	Damien Breen
2004	Kerry	0–09, 0–13	Cork	0–09, 1–07	Gaelic Grounds Páirc Uí Chaoimh	Shane Murphy
2005	Cork	3–08 (17)	Kerry	1–11 (14)	Páirc Uí Chaoimh	Eoin Cotter
2006	Kerry	1–13 (16)	Tipperary	0–08 (8)	Fitzgerald Stadium	Paddy Curran
2007	Cork	1–16 (19)	Kerry	2–08 (14)	Fitzgerald Stadium	Chris O'Donovan
2008	Kerry	1–09, 2–12	Tipperary	1–09, 0–08	Páirc Uí Chaoimh, Cork	Paul Geaney
2009	Kerry	0–12 (12)	Tipperary	0–06 (6)	Páirc Uí Chaoimh	Niall O'Shea
2010	Cork	1–08 (11)	Kerry	1–07 (10)	Fitzgerald Stadium	Daniel Fitzpatrick
2011	Tipperary	3–11 (20)	Cork	1–09 (12)	Páirc Uí Chaoimh	Liam McGrath
2012	Tipperary	2–14 (20)	Kerry	1–14 (17)	Gaelic Grounds	Dylan Fitzelle
2013	Kerry	0–15 (15)	Tipperary	0–10 (10)	Fitzgerald Stadium	Kevin Shanahan
2014	Kerry	2–17 (23)	Cork	2–13 (19)	Páirc Uí Chaoimh	Liam Kearney
2015	Kerry	2–12 (18)	Tipperary	0–07 (7)	Fitzgerald Stadium	Mark O'Connor
2016	Kerry	3–14 (23)	Cork	3–08 (17)	Fitzgerald Stadium	Sean O'Shea
2017	Kerry	2–21 (27)	Clare	0–03 (3)	Fitzgerald Stadium	David Clifford
2018	Kerry	3–21 (30)	Clare	1–07 (10)	Páirc Uí Chaoimh	Paul O'Shea
2019	Kerry	3-14 (23)	Cork	2-14 (20)	Páirc Uí Chaoimh	Jack O'Connor
2020	Kerry	2-14 (20)	Clare	1-07 (10)	Gaelic Grounds	Oisín Maunsell
2021	Cork	1-17 (20)	Limerick	0-13 (13)	Semple Stadium	Rory O'Shaughnessy & Hugh O'Connor
2022	Cork	3-11 (20)	Kerry	0-09 (9)	Páirc Uí Rinn	Colm Gillespie
2023	Kerry	2-10 (16)	Cork	0-11 (11)	Austin Stack Park	Evan Boyle
2024	Kerry	2-18 (24)	Cork	1-06 (9)	Páirc Uí Rinn	Ben Murphy
2025	Kerry	0-18 (18)	Cork	0-9 (9)	Austin Stack Park	Gearóid White
2026	Cork	1-13 (16)	Kerry	0-14 (14)	Páirc Uí Rinn	Joe Miskella

== Sources ==
- Roll of Honour on www.gaainfo.com
- Complete Roll of Honour on Kilkenny GAA bible
