= Dinny Allen =

Irish hurler and Gaelic football player

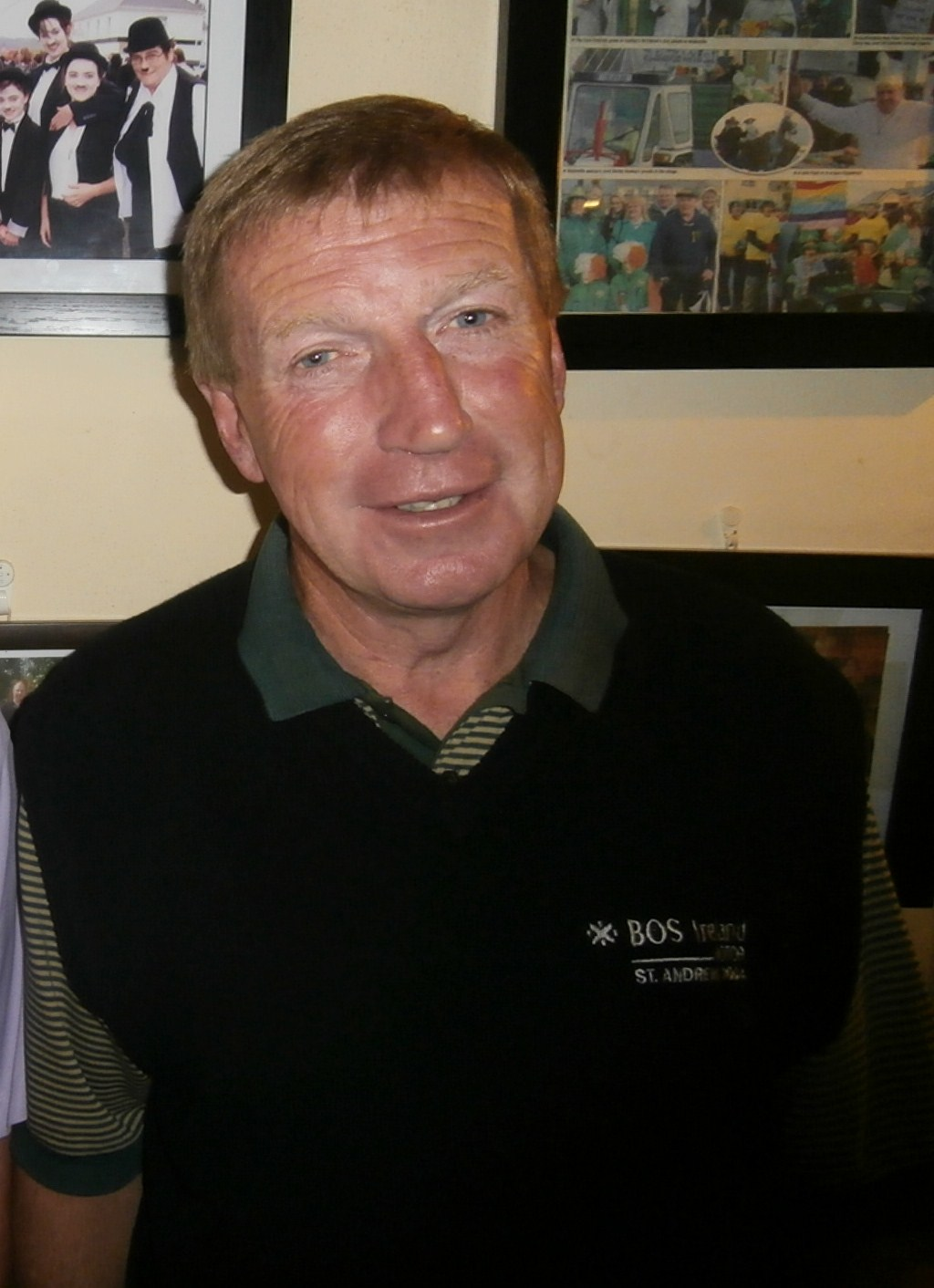
- Dinny Allen. Villa Maria. Waterville

Personal information
- Native name: Donnacha Ó hAilín (Irish)
- Nicknames: The Dinnmeister, Wise Dennis
- Born: 9 August 1952 (age 74) Cork, Ireland
- Occupation: Bank official
- Height: 5 ft 9 in (175 cm)

Sport
- Football Position: Full-forward
- Hurling Position: Half-forward
Club
| Years | Club | Apps (scores) |
| 1969–1991 | Nemo Rangers | 108 (40-245) |
Club titles
- Cork titles: 8
- Munster titles: 6
- All-Ireland Titles: 4
Inter-county
| Years | County | Apps (scores) |
| 1972–1989 1975 | Cork (SF); Cork (SH) | 34 (13–62); 4 (0–6) |
Inter-county titles
| | Football | Hurling |
| Munster Titles | 3 | 1 |
| All-Ireland Titles | 1 | 0 |

Denis 'Dinny' Allen (born 9 August 1952) is a retired Gaelic football manager and former dual player. He played both hurling and Gaelic football with his local club Nemo Rangers and was a member of the Cork senior inter-county teams in both codes from 1972 until 1989. Allen is regarded as one of the greatest Gaelic footballers of all time.

== Playing career ==
=== Club ===
Allen played his club football with the famous Nemo Rangers club in Cork and enjoyed much success. He secured his first senior county championship winners' medal in 1970 as 'Nemo' trounced west Cork side Dohenys. The club's march to success continued later in the year as the club captured the Munster club title following a three-game saga with Kerry champions Austin Stacks. Nemo Rangers werelater trounced in the All-Ireland semi-final.

After surrendering their county title in 1976, Nemo were back the following year with Allen picking up a second county winners' medal. A third county championship of the decade followed in 1978 before Allen collected a second Munster club title. The subsequent All-Ireland final pitted Nemo against Scotstown of Monaghan. Snow hampered the game, however, Cogan proved the hero as Nemo won the game by 2–9 to 1–3. It was his first All-Ireland club winners' medal.

In 1981 Allen won his fourth county championship title following a 3–11 to 0–6 defeat of Bantry Blues. A third Munster club winners' medal quickly followed before Allen lined out in another All-Ireland final. Mayo champions Garrymore provided the opposition, however, Nemo were far too powerful. Allen scored 2–2 in the first half and the Cork champs had an extraordinary 5–6 to 0–1 lead at the interval. Nemo went on to secure a record 6–11 to 1–8 victory and Allen collected a second All-Ireland winners' medal.

After losing out in 1982, Nemo were back in 1983 and Allen won his fifth county championship winners' medal. A fourth Munster club title soon followed before another All-Ireland final appearance beckoned. Walterstown provided the opposition, however, Nemo proved to be the masters again. Allen engineered two goal chances for Ephie FitzGerald as the Cork champions sealed a 2–10 to 0–5 victory. The win gave Allen a third All-Ireland club title.

Nemo Rangers went into a slight decline following this victory. The club bounced back in 1987 with Allen winning his sixth county championship winners' medal. A fifth provincial club title quickly followed, however, Nemo were subsequently defeated in the All-Ireland semi-final.

Allen secured a seventh county championship title in 1988 as Duhallow fell in the championship decider. He later picked up his sixth Munster club winners' medal as Nemo completely dominated the inter-county club championship again. Another All-Ireland final beckoned, this time with Roscommon champions Clan na Gael providing the opposition. Eoin O'Mahoney's free-taking helped Nemo to victory and Allen ended his club football career with a fourth All-Ireland winners' medal.

=== Inter-county ===
Allen first came to prominence on the inter-county scene as a member of the Cork under-21 football team in the early 1970s. He captured a Munster title in this grade in 1971 following a two-goal defeat of Kerry. Allen's side later qualified for the All-Ireland final with Fermanagh providing the opposition. A 3–10 to 0–3 score line gave Cork the victory and gave Allen an All-Ireland under-21 winners' medal. That year he also helped Cork win the Munster Junior Championship.

Allen made his senior debut for Cork in the 1972 Munster final. Cork were defeated on that occasion, however, Allen was singled out as one of Cork football's rising stars. That same year he also played soccer with Cork Hibernians, going on to win an FAI Cup winners' medal in 1973. He also later played with Cork Celtic F.C.. He showed great promise as a soccer player, even being linked with a transfer to Brian Clough's Derby County. This involvement in soccer was allegedly frowned upon by some in the Gaelic Athletic Association; despite Rule 27 being abolished in 1971, negative attitudes towards Gaels who played "foreign sports" remained. Because of this Allen lost his place on the Cork panel for 1973, denying him the chance to be part of a team which claimed both the Munster and All-Ireland titles.

Two years later in 1975 Allen returned to the Cork GAA set-up, this time as a member of the senior inter-county team. He captured a Munster winners' medal that year following the provincial final trouncing of Limerick. Cork, however, were defeated by surprise package Galway in the subsequent All-Ireland semi-final. This defeat brought Allen's hurling involvement to an end. Unfortunately for Allen, Cork went on to win the next three All-Ireland titles.

The following year Allen was appointed captain of the Cork senior football team. It was unfortunate for Allen that his senior inter-county football career coincided with the era of the greatest Kerry football team of all time. Cork lost eight consecutive Munster finals between 1975 and 1982. For a while it looked as if fate would result in Allen ending his career without any success with the footballers.

In 1983 Kerry were aiming to capture a record-breaking ninth Munster title in-a-row. Cork had different ideas and provided stern opposition. At the full-time whistle Cork were the champions by the narrowest of margins. After eighth consecutive provincial final defeats, the 3–10 to 3–9 score line finally gave Allen a Munster winners' medal. The subsequent All-Ireland semi-final pitted Cork against Dublin. That game ended in a draw and the replay was played at Páirc Uí Chaoimh. In spite of Allen scoring two goals Cork were outclassed on that occasion as 'the Dubs' won by 4–15 to 2–10.

Kerry reclaimed their provincial title in 1984 and it looked as if Allen's career was drawing to a close. That same year he was named on a special team to mark the centenary year of the Gaelic Athletic Association. Allen was named in the left corner-forward position on the Football Team of the Century, made up of players who never won a senior All-Ireland medal.

In 1986 Allen was dropped from the panel. He was recalled to the side two years later in 1988 at the age of 36 and captured a second Munster winners' medal following a narrow 1–14 to 0–16 win over arch-rivals Kerry. Cork later qualified for the All-Ireland final with Meath providing the opposition. Cork stormed ahead after just three minutes when Teddy McCarthy scored the only goal of five consecutive All-Ireland final appearances for Cork. Meath fought back and secured a 0–12 to 1–9 draw. The replay proved to be a tough, controversial affair with Meath reduced to fourteen men with the sending off of Gerry McEntee. In spite of being outnumbered Meath still won the game by 0–13 to 0–12.

Following this result Allen contemplated retiring from inter-county football, however, after another impressive campaign with Nemo Rangers he was persuaded by Billy Morgan to stay on for another year. His decision bore fruit as he was rewarded with the captaincy of the team. 1989 began well with Allen playing a key role in helping Cork to claim the National League title. He later added a third Munster medal to his collection following another win over Kerry. The subsequent All-Ireland final saw Mayo play Cork in a unique pairing. Cork were on top for much of the game, however, a goal by substitute Anthony Finnerty gave Mayo a brief lead. Mayo failed to score for the last nineteen minutes as Teddy McCarthy took over and gave a masterful display at midfield. Cork held on to win the game by 0–17 to 1–11. Seventeen years after he first lined out for Cork Allen had finally collected a senior All-Ireland winners' medal. He also had the honour of accepting the Sam Maguire Cup on behalf of his county.

Allen retired from inter-county football following this triumph.

=== Association football ===
In addition to his Gaelic games career, Allen played association football at both junior and League of Ireland level. He played junior football with St Mary's, reaching a FAI Junior Cup final which he missed to play a hurling match for Nemo, a decision which he would later describe by saying "to this day I would put it down as the worst decision I made in sport". Allen would later sign for Cork Hibs and go on to win the FAI Senior Cup in 1972. He later played with Cork Celtic (78-79), Cork United (79-81) and finally Cork City in their debut season in 1984.

== Personal life ==
He is married to Frances Barry-Murphy, sister of Jimmy Barry-Murphy.

== Career statistics ==
| Team | Season | Cork | | Munster | | All-Ireland | | Total | |
| Team | Season | Apps | Score | Apps | Score | Apps | Score | Apps | Score |
|---|---|---|---|---|---|---|---|---|---|
| Nemo Rangers | 1969–70 | 0 | 0–00 | — | | — | | 0 | 0–00 |
| Nemo Rangers | 1970–71 | 4 | 4–14 | — | | — | | 4 | 4–14 |
| Nemo Rangers | 1971–72 | 3 | 0–01 | — | | — | | 3 | 0–01 |
| Nemo Rangers | 1972–73 | 5 | 1–18 | 0 | 0–00 | 0 | 0–00 | 5 | 1–18 |
| Nemo Rangers | 1973–74 | 0 | 0–00 | — | | — | | 0 | 0–00 |
| Nemo Rangers | 1974–75 | 0 | 0–00 | 0 | 0–00 | 0 | 0–00 | 0 | 0–00 |
| Nemo Rangers | 1975–76 | 6 | 5–13 | 4 | 3–12 | 1 | 0–01 | 11 | 8–26 |
| Nemo Rangers | 1976–77 | 3 | 1–03 | — | | — | | 3 | 1–03 |
| Nemo Rangers | 1977–78 | 4 | 3–08 | 2 | 0–03 | — | | 6 | 3–11 |
| Nemo Rangers | 1978–79 | 7 | 2–36 | 3 | 1–12 | 2 | 0–04 | 12 | 3–52 |
| Nemo Rangers | 1979–80 | 3 | 0–08 | — | | — | | 3 | 0–08 |
| Nemo Rangers | 1980–81 | 6 | 2–25 | — | | — | | 6 | 2–25 |
| Nemo Rangers | 1981–82 | 4 | 0–18 | 2 | 1–07 | 2 | 2–06 | 8 | 3–31 |
| Nemo Rangers | 1982–83 | 3 | 0–07 | — | | — | | 3 | 0–07 |
| Nemo Rangers | 1983–84 | 5 | 2–08 | 2 | 0–04 | 2 | 0–04 | 9 | 2–16 |
| Nemo Rangers | 1984–85 | 1 | 0–01 | — | | — | | 1 | 0–01 |
| Nemo Rangers | 1985–86 | 3 | 0–03 | — | | — | | 3 | 0–03 |
| Nemo Rangers | 1986–87 | 3 | 1–07 | — | | — | | 3 | 1–07 |
| Nemo Rangers | 1987–88 | 5 | 3–03 | 3 | 2–02 | 1 | 0–00 | 9 | 5–05 |
| Nemo Rangers | 1988–89 | 5 | 3–06 | 2 | 1–01 | 2 | 0–01 | 9 | 4–08 |
| Nemo Rangers | 1989–90 | 3 | 0–04 | — | | — | | 3 | 0–04 |
| Nemo Rangers | 1990–91 | 4 | 2–04 | — | | — | | 4 | 2–04 |
| Nemo Rangers | 1991–92 | 3 | 1–01 | — | | — | | 3 | 1–01 |
| Career total | | 80 | 30-188 | 18 | 8-41 | 10 | 2-16 | 108 | 40-245 |

== Honours ==
=== Player ===
Nemo Rangers

- All-Ireland Senior Club Football Championship: 1979, 1982, 1984, 1989
- Munster Senior Club Football Championship: 1975, 1978, 1981, 1983, 1987, 1988
- Cork Senior Football Championship: 1972, 1975, 1977, 1978, 1981, 1983, 1987, 1988
- Cork Intermediate Hurling Championship: 1971
- Cork Minor Football Championship: 1970
- Cork Minor Hurling Championship: 1970

Cork

- All-Ireland Senior Football Championship: 1989 (c)
- Munster Senior Football Championship: 1983, 1988, 1989 (c)
- Munster Senior Hurling Championship: 1975
- All-Ireland Under-21 Football Championship: 1971
- Munster Under-21 Football Championship: 1971

Munster

- Railway Cup: 1976, 1977, 1981, 1982

=== Manager ===
Nemo Rangers

- All-Ireland Senior Club Football Championship: 1994
- Munster Senior Club Football Championship: 1993
- Cork Senior Football Championship: 1993

Sporting positions
| Preceded by Jimmy Barrett | Cork Senior Football Captain; 1976 | Succeeded by Jimmy Barry-Murphy |
| Preceded by Christy Ryan | Cork Senior Football Captain; 1982 | Succeeded by Christy Ryan |
| Preceded by Tony Nation | Cork Senior Football Captain; 1989 | Succeeded by Larry Tompkins |
Achievements
| Preceded by Joe Cassells (Meath) | All-Ireland Senior Football winning captain 1989 | Succeeded by Larry Tompkins (Cork) |
