= Colm Murphy (Gaelic footballer) =

Irish Gaelic footballer

Personal information
- Native name: Colm Ó Murchú (Irish)
- Born: 1952 (age 73–74) Cork, Ireland
- Occupation: ESB supervisor

Sport
- Sport: Gaelic football
- Position: Left corner-forward
Club
- Years: Club
- 1970-1988: Nemo Rangers
Club titles
- Cork titles: 8
- Munster titles: 7
- All-Ireland Titles: 4
Inter-county
| Years | County | Apps (scores) |
| 1975-1976 | Cork | 1 (0-00) |
Inter-county titles
- Munster titles: 0
- All-Irelands: 0
- NFL: 0
- All Stars: 0

Colm Murphy (born 1952) is an Irish former Gaelic footballer. He played for club side Nemo Rangers and at inter-county level with the Cork senior football team.

== Career ==
Murphy first came to prominence as a Gaelic footballer at schools' level with Coláiste Chríost Rí. He simultaneously lined out with the Nemo Rangers club at juvenile and underage levels before joining the club's senior team in 1970. Murphy was a mainstay of the team for several years, and won four All-Ireland Club Championship titles, including one as team captain. His silverware at club level also includes seven Munster Club Championships, while he also became the first player to win eight Cork County Championship medals. Murphy was a member of the Cork senior football team for two seasons.

== Honours ==
Nemo Rangers

- All-Ireland Senior Club Football Championship: 1973, 1979, 1982 (c), 1984
- Munster Senior Club Football Championship: 1972, 1974, 1975, 1978, 1981, 1983, 1987
- Cork Senior Football Championship: 1972, 1974, 1975, 1977, 1978, 1981, 1983, 1987
