= Kieran Murphy (Gaelic footballer) =

Irish Gaelic footballer

Personal information
- Native name: Ciarán Ó Murchú (Irish)
- Born: 1955 (age 70–71) Cork, Ireland

Sport
- Sport: Gaelic football
- Position: Left corner-back
Club
- Years: Club
- Nemo Rangers
Club titles
- Cork titles: 6
- Munster titles: 5
- All-Ireland Titles: 3
Inter-county
Years	County	Apps (scores)
1976-1978	Cork	3 (0-00)
Inter-county titles
- Munster titles: 0
- All-Irelands: 0
- NFL: 0
- All Stars: 0

Kieran Murphy (born 1955) is an Irish retired Gaelic footballer who played for Cork Championship club Nemo Rangers and at inter-county level with the Cork senior football team.

== Career ==
Murphy first came to sporting prominence as a dual player at schoolboy level with Coláiste Chríost Rí. He simultaneously lined out at juvenile and underage levels with the Nemo Rangers club and won several championship titles in the minor and under-21 grades. At adult level he was part of three All-Ireland Club Championship-winning teams with Nemo. Murphy first appeared on the inter-county scene with the Cork minor football team. His three-year tenure with the team yielded an All-Ireland MFC title in 1972 before later lining out with the under-21 team. Murphy joined the Cork senior football team in 1976 and was a panel member for three seasons before leaving the team. He usually lined out at corner-back.

== Honours ==
Nemo Rangers

- All-Ireland Senior Club Football Championship: 1979, 1982, 1984
- Munster Senior Club Football Championship: 1974, 1975, 1978, 1981, 1983
- Cork Senior Football Championship: 1974, 1975, 1977, 1978, 1981, 1983
- Cork Under-21 Football Championship: 1974, 1975
- Cork Minor Football Championship: 1972

Cork

- Munster Under-21 Football Championship: 1974
- All-Ireland Minor Football Championship: 1971
- Munster Minor Football Championship: 1971, 1972
- Munster Minor Hurling Championship: 1971
