= Séamus Coughlan =

Cork Gaelic footballer

Seámus Coughlan
Personal information
- Native name: Seámus Ó Cochlainn (Irish)
- Nickname: Séamie
- Born: 27 March 1953 Ballyphehane, Cork, Ireland
- Died: 9 February 2013 (aged 59) Curraheen, Cork, Ireland
- Occupation: Army commandant
- Height: 6 ft 3 in (191 cm)

Sport
- Sport: Gaelic football
- Position: Centre-forward
Club
- Years: Club
- 1971–1988: Nemo Rangers
Club titles
- Cork titles: 7
- Munster titles: 6
- All-Ireland Titles: 3
Inter-county
Years	County	Apps (scores)
1973–1978	Cork	8 (3–8)
Inter-county titles
- Munster titles: 1
- All-Irelands: 1
- NFL: 0
- All Stars: 0

James J. Coughlan (27 March 1953 – 9 February 2013), known as Séamus Coughlan, was an Irish Gaelic footballer and coach. At club level he played with Nemo Rangers and was also a member of the Cork senior football team.

== Early life ==
Born and raised in Cork, Coughlan first played with Ballyphehane side Joseph Plunkett's that won city under-13 hurling and football titles; however, following an objection to an overage player, were not awarded medals. He was a contemporary of Carl Humphries, and briefly played schoolboy soccer with Everton as a centre-forward. Coughlan attended Coláiste Chríost Rí, and was a member of the school's senior football team that won the Corn Uí Mhuirí title in 1970, before later claiming the Hogan Cup after a defeat of a St Malachy's College team that featured Martin O'Neill.

== Club career ==
After his juvenile playing days with the Ballyphehane outfit came to an end, Coughlan joined the Nemo Rangers club. His underage career began as a dual player and he was part of the Nemo minor teams that claimed a double of county titles in 1970. He later won a Cork U21FC title in his final year in the under-21 grade.

By that stage Coughlan had already broken onto the club's top adult teams in both codes. He was still eligible for the minor grade when he won a Cork IHC title after a win over Carrigtwohill in a 1971 final replay. A year later, Coughlan was amongst the goal-scorers when Nemo Rangers won their very first Cork SFC title after beating University College Cork in the 1972 final. After claiming the Munster SCFC title his season ended with further honours when Nemo beat St. Vincent's in the 1973 All-Ireland club final replay. Coughlan was again part of the Nemo team that won the 1974 Cork SFC title; however, his side were subsequently beaten by University College Dublin in the 1975 All-Ireland Club SFC final.

Coughlan won a third set of Cork SFC and Munster SCFC titles after respective defeats of Dohenys and Austin Stacks in 1975. He was appointed team captain in 1977, and ended the season with a fourth Cork SFC winners' medal after a defeat of St Michael's in the final. Coughlan retained the captaincy the following year; however, his season ended prematurely when he was diagnosed with hepatitis.

After losing four stone in weight and spending a prolonged period of time out of the game, Coughlan fought his way back fitness to reclaim his position on the team in 1981. After winning a fourth Munster SCFC that year he later claimed a second All-Ireland Club SFC winners' medal after a 15-point defeat of Garrymore in the 1982 All-Ireland Club SFC final. Nemo Rangers made another clean sweep of all available football titles during the 1983-84 season, with Coughlan claimed a third All-Ireland Club SFC title after beating Walterstown in the 1984 All-Ireland Club SFC final. He was in the twilight of his career when he won his seventh Cork SFC title after a defeat of Imokilly in the 1987 Cork SFC final, before later claiming a sixth Munster SCFC medal. Coughlan ended his club career after Nemo's defeat by St Mary's, Burren in the 1988 All-Ireland Club SFC semi-final.

== Inter-county career ==
Coughlan began his inter-county career as a dual player when he captained both the Cork minor hurling and football teams in 1971. After captaining both teams to their respective Munster Championship titles he was dropped from the starting fifteen for the 1971 All-Ireland MHC final against Kilkenny, a move which resulted in protests by the Nemo Rangers club. Coughlan came on as a substitute for Jimmy Barry-Murphy to claim a winners' medal after the three-point victory. Coughlan retained the captaincy of the Cork minor football team that lost the 1971 All-Ireland MFC final to Mayo three weeks later.

Coughlan subsequently progressed to under-21 level where he continued his dual player status for a period. He was a member of the extended panel of the Cork under-21 hurling team that beat Wexford in the 1973 All-Ireland U21HC final. Coughlan won a Munster U21FC title with the under-21 football team in 1974.

By that stage Coughlan had joined the Cork senior football team. After coming on as a substitute for John Coleman and scoring 1–1 in the 1973 All-Ireland SFC semi-final defeat of Tyrone, he later claimed an All-Ireland SFC winners' medal as a substitute in the 1973 All-Ireland SFC final defeat of Galway. Coughlan's army career resulted in him missing out on Cork's second successive Munster SFC title in 1974. He subsequently returned to the team and lined out when Cork suffered Munster SFC final defeats by Kerry in 1975, 1976 and 1977. Coughlan's last game for Cork was as a substitute in the 1978 Munster SFC final defeat.

== Army career ==
Coughlan spent 24 years with the Irish Army. During that time he served on a UN peacekeeping mission in the Lebanon before attaining the rank of Commandant.

== Personal life and death ==
After his retirement from the Army he spent 16 years as manager of the Cork County Board GAA Clubs' draw. His son, Derek, played association football in the League of Ireland with Cork City and Bohemians.

Coughlan died from cancer on 9 February 2013, aged 59.

== Honours ==
Coláiste Chríost Rí

- Hogan Cup: 1970
- Corn Uí Mhuirí: 1970

Nemo Rangers

- All-Ireland Senior Club Football Championship: 1973, 1982, 1984
- Munster Senior Club Football Championship: 1972, 1974, 1975, 1981, 1983, 1987
- Cork Senior Football Championship: 1972, 1974, 1975, 1977, 1978, 1983, 1987
- Cork Intermediate Hurling Championship: 1971
- Cork Under-21 Football Championship: 1974
- Cork Minor Football Championship: 1970
- Cork Minor Hurling Championship: 1970

Cork

- All-Ireland Senior Football Championship: 1973
- Munster Senior Football Championship: 1973
- All-Ireland Under-21 Hurling Championship: 1973
- Munster Under-21 Hurling Championship: 1973
- Munster Under-21 Football Championship: 1974
- All-Ireland Minor Hurling Championship: 1971
- All-Ireland Minor Football Championship: 1971
- Munster Minor Hurling Championship: 1971 (c)
- Munster Minor Football Championship: 1971

Sporting positions
Preceded by Pat Kavanagh	Cork minor hurling team captain 1971	Succeeded by John Buckley
Preceded by	Cork minor football team captain 1971	Succeeded by Gerard Aherne
