= Frank Cogan =

Irish former sportsperson

Personal information
- Native name: Prionsias Ó Cógáin (Irish)
- Born: 15 June 1944 (age 82) Blackrock, Cork, Ireland
- Occupation: Retired FÁS supervisor
- Height: 5 ft 11 in (180 cm)

Sport
- Sport: Gaelic football
- Position: Right corner-back
Clubs
- Years: Club
- 1963–1982 1963–1966: Nemo Rangers → University College Cork
Club titles
- Cork titles: 7
- Munster titles: 5
- All-Ireland Titles: 3
College
- Years: College
- 1963–1966: University College Cork
College titles
- Sigerson titles: 1
Inter-county*
Years	County	Apps (scores)
1965–1974	Cork	23 (0–00)
Inter-county titles
- Munster titles: 5
- All-Irelands: 1
- NFL: 0
- All Stars: 1
- *Inter County team apps and scores correct as of 13:56, 5 September 2021.

Matthew Francis Cogan (born 15 June 1944), known as Frank Cogan, is an Irish former Gaelic football coach and player. At club level he played with Nemo Rangers and was a member of and later coached the Cork senior football team. Cogan usually lined out as a defender.

== Playing career ==
Cogan first came to Gaelic football prominence as a schoolboy at Coláiste Chríost Rí before later winning a Sigerson Cup title with University College Cork in 1966. He had earlier won the first of seven County Championship medals with the college; the other six were claimed with the Nemo Rangers club, with whom he also won three All-Ireland Club Championship titles. Cogan first appeared on the inter-county scene as a member of the Cork minor team that won the county's inaugural All-Ireland Minor Championship title in 1961. He later spent three seasons with the Cork under-21 team and was at centre-back for the 1965 All-Ireland under-21 final defeat by Kildare. Cogan's performances at underage levels saw him drafted onto the Cork senior football team and he made his debut against Dublin during the 1965-66 league. He was a mainstay on the team for much of the following decade and was at left corner-back for Cork's 1973 All-Ireland Championship success. Cogan's other honours include five Munster Championship medals and a Railway Cup title with Munster, however, a serious leg injury brought his inter-county career to an end in 1974.

== Coaching career ==
Cogan first became involved in coaching at various levels with the Nemo Rangers club. At inter-county level he coached the Cork minor team to an All-Ireland final defeat by Galway in 1976. Cogan subsequently took charge of the coaching duties with the Cork senior team, guiding the team to a league final defeat by Roscommon in 1979. He became a close coaching associate of Billy Morgan and was defensive coach and assistant team masseur when the Cork senior team won two All-Ireland Championship titles from four consecutive finals appearances between 1987 and 1990.

== Personal life ==
Cogan's grandfather, Matt Gargan, won five All-Ireland Championships with the Kilkenny senior hurling team in a seven-season spell from 1907 to 1913. His uncle, Jack Gargan, also claimed All-Ireland honours as part of the Kilkenny team that beat Cork in the 1939 All-Ireland final. Cogan's brother-in-law, Billy Morgan, was a teammate at club and inter-county levels, while another brother-in-law, Ray Cummins, captained the Cork senior hurling team.

== Honours ==
=== Player ===
Coláiste Chríost Rí

- Frewen Cup: 1960

University College Cork

- Sigerson Cup: 1966
- Cork Senior Football Championship: 1964

Nemo Rangers

- All-Ireland Senior Club Football Championship: 1973, 1979, 1982
- Munster Senior Club Football Championship: 1972, 1974, 1975 (c), 1978, 1981
- Cork Senior Football Championship: 1972, 1974, 1975 (c), 1977, 1978, 1981
- Cork Intermediate Hurling Championship: 1971 (c)

Cork

- All-Ireland Senior Football Championship: 1973
- Munster Senior Football Championship: 1966, 1967, 1971, 1973, 1974
- Munster Under-21 Football Championship: 1965
- All-Ireland Minor Football Championship: 1961
- Munster Minor Football Championship: 1961

Munster

- Railway Cup: 1972

=== Coach ===
Cork

- Munster Minor Football Championship: 1976, 1977

Sporting positions
Preceded by Donie O'Donovan	Cork Senior Football Team Coach; 1977-1979	Succeeded by Billy Morgan
