= 2001 Cork Intermediate Football Championship =

Gaelic football competition

- Sponsor: Permanent TSB
- Champions: Newcestown (2nd title); Dan McCarthy (captain); Gene O'Driscoll (manager)
- Runners-up: Nemo Rangers; Dinny Allen (manager)

The 2001 Cork Intermediate Football Championship was the 66th staging of the Cork Intermediate Football Championship since its establishment by the Cork County Board in 1909.

The final was played on 14 October 2001 at Brinny Sportsfield, between Newcestown and Nemo Rangers, in what was their first ever meeting in the final. Newcestown won the match by 0–13 to 0–06 to claim their second championship title overall and a first title in 30 years.

== Results ==
=== Final ===
14 October 2001 Final	Newcestown	0-13 - 0-06	Nemo Rangers	Brinny Sportsfield
