= List of Cork senior Gaelic football team captains =

This article lists players who have captained the senior Cork county football team in the Munster Senior Football Championship and the All-Ireland Senior Football Championship. The captain is no longer chosen from the club that has won the Cork Senior Football Championship.

== List of captains ==
Year	Player	Club	National Titles	Provincial Titles
1928	Joe Kearney	UCC		Munster Football Final winning captain
1929				
1930	James J. Hogan			
1931				
1932				
1933				
1934				
1935				
1936				
1937				
1938	Tim Harrington	Bantry Blues		
1939	Jack Lynch	St. Nicholas'		
1940	Mick Finn	Clonakilty		
1941	Denis J. O'Sullivan	Garnish		
1942				
1943	Tadhgo Crowley	Clonakilty		Munster Football Final winning captain
1944	Mick Finn	Clonakilty		
1945	Dessie Cullinane	Clonakilty		
1945	Tadhgo Crowley	Clonakilty	All-Ireland Football Final winning captain	Munster Football Final winning captain
1946	Dave Magnier	Fermoy		
1947	Fachtna O'Donovan	Clonakilty		
1948	Fachtna O'Donovan	Clonakilty		
1949	John O'Keeffe	Millstreet		Munster Football Final winning captain
1950	John Cronin	Collins		
1951	Con McGrath	Garda		
1952	Éamonn Young	Collins		Munster Football Final winning captain
1953	Humphrey O'Neill	Clonakilty		
1954	Niall FitzGerald	Collins		
1955				
1956	Donal O'Sullivan	Lees		Munster Football Final winning captain
1957	Nealie Duggan	Lees		Munster Football Final winning captain
1958	Paddy O'Driscoll	Garda		
1959	Dan Murray	Macroom		
1960	Donal Hurley	St. Finbarr's		
1961	Paddy Harrington	Garda		
1962	Johnny O'Flynn	Kilshannig		
1963				
1964				
1965				
1966	Jerry O'Sullivan	St. Nicholas'		Munster Football Final winning captain
1967	Denis Coughlan	St. Nicholas'		Munster Football Final winning captain
1968	Bernie O'Neill	Adrigole		
1969	Dan Dineen	Bantry Blues		
1969	Donal Hunt	Bantry Blues		
1970	Pat O'Doherty	St Nicholas'		
1971	Mick Scannell	Naomh Abán		Munster Football Final winning captain
1972	Donal Hunt	Bantry Blues		
1973	Billy Morgan	Nemo Rangers	All-Ireland Football Final winning captain	Munster Football Final winning captain
1974	Denis Coughlan	St. Nicholas'		Munster Football Final winning captain
1975	Jimmy Barrett	Nemo Rangers		
1976	Dinny Allen	Nemo Rangers		
1977	Jimmy Barry-Murphy	St. Finbarr's		
1978	Brian Murphy	Nemo Rangers		
1979	Brian Murphy	Nemo Rangers		
1980	Christy Ryan	St. Finbarr's		
1981	Christy Ryan	St. Finbarr's		
1982	Dinny Allen	Nemo Rangers		
1983	Christy Ryan	St. Finbarr's		Munster Football Final winning captain
1984	Jimmy Kerrigan	Nemo Rangers		
1985	Conor Counihan	Aghada		
1986	John Kerins	St. Finbarr's		
1987	Conor Counihan	Aghada		Munster Football Final winning captain
1988	Tony Nation	Nemo Rangers		Munster Football Final winning captain
1989	Dinny Allen	Nemo Rangers	All-Ireland Football Final winning captain	Munster Football Final winning captain
1990	Larry Tompkins	Castlehaven	All-Ireland Football Final winning captain	Munster Football Final winning captain
1991	Danny Culloty	Duhallow		
1992	Danny Culloty	Duhallow		
1993	Mick McCarthy	O'Donovan Rossa		Munster Football Final winning captain
1994	Steven O'Brien	Nemo Rangers		Munster Football Final winning captain
1995	Niall Cahalane	Castlehaven		Munster Football Final winning captain
1996	Mark O'Connor	Bantry Blues		
1997	Brian Murphy	Clonakilty		
1998	Ciarán O'Sullivan	Urhan		
1999	Philip Clifford	Bantry Blues		Munster Football Final winning captain
2000	Philip Clifford	UCC		
2001	Joe Kavanagh	Nemo Rangers		
2002	Colin Corkery	Nemo Rangers		Munster Football Final winning captain
2003	Martin Cronin	Nemo Rangers		
2004	Colin Crowley	Castlehaven		
2005	Eoin Sexton	Kilbrittain		
2006	Derek Kavanagh	Nemo Rangers		Munster Football Final winning captain
2007	Derek Kavanagh	Nemo Rangers		
2008	Graham Canty	Bantry Blues		Munster Football Final winning captain
2009	Graham Canty	Bantry Blues		Munster Football Final winning captain
2010	Graham Canty	Bantry Blues	All-Ireland Football Final winning captain	
2011	Graham Canty	Bantry Blues		
2012	Graham Canty	Bantry Blues		Munster Football Final winning captain
2013	Graham Canty	Bantry Blues		
2014	Michael Shields	St. Finbarr's		
2015	Michael Shields	St. Finbarr's		
2016	Paul Kerrigan	Nemo Rangers		
2017	Paul Kerrigan	Nemo Rangers		
2018	Ian Maguire	St. Finbarr's		
2019	Ian Maguire	St. Finbarr's		
2020	Ian Maguire	St. Finbarr's		
2021	Ian Maguire	St. Finbarr's		

== See also ==
- List of Cork senior ladies' Gaelic football team captains
