= Brian Murphy (Gaelic games) =

Irish Gaelic footballer and hurler (born 1952)

Personal information
- Native name: Briain Ó Murchú (Irish)
- Born: 2 February 1952 (age 74) Cork, Ireland
- Occupation: Garda Síochána
- Height: 5 ft 10 in (178 cm)

Sport
- Football Position: Left corner-back
- Hurling Position: Right corner-back
Club
- Years: Club
- 1970–1987: Nemo Rangers
Club titles
	Football	Hurling
Cork titles	7	0
Munster titles	6	0
All-Ireland titles	4	0
Inter-county*
Years	County	Apps (scores)
1972–1979 1971–1983	Cork (football); Cork (hurling)	19 (0-00); 35 (0-00)
Inter-county titles
	Football	Hurling
Munster Titles	2	7
All-Ireland Titles	1	3
League titles	0	3
All-Stars	2	2
- *Inter County team apps and scores correct as of 15:00, 30 March 2013.

Brian Murphy (born 2 February 1952) is an Irish retired dual player of Gaelic football and hurler who played as a corner-back for the Cork senior teams.

Regarded as one of the greatest dual players of all-time due to his unique distinction of winning All-Ireland medals at minor, under-21, and senior levels in both codes, Murphy joined the team during the 1971–72 National Hurling League and was a regular member of the starting fifteen in both codes until his retirement after the 1983 hurling championship. During that time his hurling honours include three All-Ireland medals, seven Munster medals, three National League medals and two All-Star awards. His football honours include one All-Ireland medal, two Munster medals and two All-Star awards. Murphy was an All-Ireland runner-up on three occasions.

At club level Murphy was a four-time All-Ireland medalist with Nemo Rangers GAA. In addition to this he has also won six Munster medals and seven county football championship medals.

== Playing career ==
=== Colleges ===
Murphy first tasted success while receiving his secondary school education at Coláiste Chríost Rí.

In 1968 he was part of the college hurling team that defeated CBS Sexton Street of Limerick to claim the Dr. Harty Cup for the first and only time in their history.

Two years later Murphy was captain of the Coláiste Chríost Rí senior football team and won a Corn Uí Mhuirí medal following a defeat of Coláiste Íosagáin from Ballyvourney. The subsequent All-Ireland decider saw St. Malachy's of Belfast, a team featuring future Northern Ireland soccer international Martin O'Neill, provide the opposition. The game has gone down as one of the most exciting ever, with Coláiste Chríost Rí coming back from an eight-point deficit to defeat St. Malachy's with a last-minute goal. A 4–5 to 1–13 victory gave Murphy an All-Ireland medal while he also had the honour of collecting the cup as captain.

=== Club ===
Murphy played his club hurling and football with Nemo Rangers and enjoyed much success during a golden age for the club.

A dual championship medalist in the respective minor grades in 1970, Murphy subsequently joined the top teams at the club. The following year he won an intermediate hurling championship medal following a 4–11 to 2–3 trouncing of Carrigtwohill in a replay of the decider.

In 1972 Murphy was a key member of the Nemo Rangers senior football team that qualified for the senior championship decider. A 2–9 to 0–8 defeat of University College Cork gave him his first championship medal. Murphy later added a Munster medal to his collection as Doonbeg were accounted for by 3–9 to 0–5. St. Vincent's of Dublin provided the opposition in the subsequent All-Ireland decider, however, a late Jimmy Keaveney point forced a 2–11 apiece draw. The replay was much more conclusive as first-half goals by Jimmy Barrett and Billy Cogan were followed by two more Liam Goode and Séamus Coughlan goals in the second-half. The final score of 4–6 to 0–10 gave Murphy a first All-Ireland medal.

Murphy added a second championship medal to his collection in 1974 as divisional side Carbery were defeated by 2–8 to 1–8. He later won a second Munster medal as Nemo defeated Austin Stack's by 2–6 to 1–7. University College Dublin later provided the opposition in the All-Ireland decider, however, Murphy's side were defeated by 1–11 to 0–12.

1975 saw Murphy capture a third championship medal as Dohenys were trounced by 4–12 to 0–7. A second successive 1–9 to 0–10 defeat of Austin Stack's, after two drawn games, gave him a third Munster medal.

After surrendering their titles in 1976, Nemo were back the following year with Murphy picking up a fourth championship medal following a 1–8 to 1–3 defeat of St Michael's.

Nemo made it two-in-a-row in 1978, with Murphy winning a fifth championship medal as captain as St. Michael's were bested once again. He later added a fourth Munster medal to his collection as Kilrush Shamrocks were defeated by three points. The subsequent All-Ireland final pitted Nemo against Scotstown of Monaghan. Snow hampered the game, however, Frank Cogan proved the hero as Nemo won the game by 2–9 to 1–3. It was Murphy's second All-Ireland medal.

In 1981 Murphy won a sixth championship medal as Nemo defeated Bantry Blues by 3–11 to 0–6. A subsequent 3–9 to 1–6 defeat of Kilrush Shamrocks gave him a fifth Munster medal. Garrymore of Mayo provided the opposition in the All-Ireland final, however, the game turned into a rout. A 6–11 to 1–8 victory gave Murphy a third All-Ireland medal.

Nemo surrendered their titles the following year, however, in 1983 Murphy picked up his seventh and final championship medal following a huge 4–12 to 2–3 defeat of Clonakilty. Another 2–10 to 0–3 trouncing of Doonbeg gave him a sixth Munster medal before later lining out in another All-Ireland decider. A 2–10 to 0–5 defeat of Walterstown gave Murphy a fourth and final All-Ireland medal.

=== Minor and under-21 ===
Murphy first came to prominence on the inter-county scene as a dual player in the minor grades in 1969. He was an unused substitute that year as the Cork minor hurlers captured the Munster and All-Ireland crowns.

That same year Murphy was also a regular starter with the Cork minor football team and won a Munster medal following a 3–11 to 0–12 defeat of Kerry. Cork later faced Derry in the All-Ireland decider. A 2–7 to 0–11 victory gave Murphy an All-Ireland Minor Football Championship medal.

In 1970 Murphy established himself on the Cork minor hurling team and won his first Munster medal on the field of play following a narrow 3–8 to 4–4 defeat of Tipperary. Cork later faced Galway in the All-Ireland decider and a rout took place. A huge 5–19 to 2–9 victory gave Murphy an All-Ireland medal in what was his last game in that grade.

The following year Murphy lined in both codes in the under-21 grade. He was an unused substitute as Cork captured the Munster crown in hurling, however, he was at left corner-back for the subsequent All-Ireland decider. Wexford stood in the way of Cork securing a record-breaking fourth successive championship and a high-scoring game ensued. A 7–8 to 1–11 victory gave Murphy his first All-Ireland medal.

The Cork under-21 football team also enjoyed a successful championship campaign in 1971. A 1–10 to 2–5 defeat of Waterford gave Murphy a Munster medal in that code. Cork later faced Fermanagh in the All-Ireland final, however, the game was a complete mismatch. A comprehensive 3–10 to 0–3 victory for Cork gave Murphy an All-Ireland medal.

Two years later in 1973 Murphy won a Munster under-21 hurling medal on the field of play as Limerick were accounted for on a 4–11 to 2–7 score line. Once again Cork later faced Wexford in the All-Ireland decider and a close game developed. A 2–10 to 4–2 victory gave Murphy a second All-Ireland medal in that code.

=== Senior ===
Murphy made his senior hurling debut for Cork during the 1969–70 National League. It was a successful campaign for the Rebels as a 3–14 to 2–14 defeat of Limerick in the decider gave Murphy his first National Hurling League medal. A subsequent 6–18 to 2–8 thrashing of Clare gave him a first Munster medal. The subsequent All-Ireland decider saw Cork face Kilkenny. The Rebels dominated the early exchanges and went eight points clear after a long-range score from wing-back Con Roche in the 17th minute of the second half. Remarkably they didn't didn't score again. Kilkenny took control with Pat Henderson a key figure at centre-back and Eddie Keher cutting loose up front. They were level after a Frank Cummins goal and went on to win by eight points.

The following year Murphy was in his second season as a regular with the Cork senior football team. He won his first Munster medal that year following a 5–12 to 1–15 defeat of arch-rivals Kerry. The subsequent All-Ireland final pitted Cork against Galway. Teenage sensation Jimmy Barry-Murphy scored the first of his two goals after just two minutes, while a third goal gave Cork a 3–17 to 2–13 victory and gave Murphy an All-Ireland medal He finished off the year by claiming his first All-Star award.

Murphy won another Munster football title in 1974, as well as a National Hurling League medal. 1975 saw him win another Munster hurling medal – the first of five in-a-row for Murphy and Cork – as well as a Munster club football title with Nemo Rangers once again. The following year (1976) saw Cork begin a series of wins in the hurling championship, with Murphy playing a key role at corner-back. That year he won his first senior All-Ireland medal, before winning a Railway Cup medal with Munster and a second All Star Award for football. In 1977 Murphy claimed his second All-Ireland hurling medal in-a-row, together with his second Railway Cup medal in-a-row. 1978 saw Murphy was instrumental in helping Cork to complete a remarkable three All-Ireland hurling victories in-a-row, marking the team out as one of the greatest of all time. Once again Murphy completed another treble by claiming a third consecutive Railway Cup title with Munster. In 1979 the Cork senior hurlers almost succeeded in making it to the hurling final again, however, they were defeated by Galway in the semi-final. The year ended, however, with Murphy winning a second All-Ireland club title with Nemo Rangers as well as his first All Star Award in hurling.

1979 was Murphy's last year as a dual star. He retired from inter-county football and decided to concentrate full-time on inter-county hurling. His decision paid off as he won back-to-back National Hurling League titles in 1980 and 1981, as well as his first Railway Cup medal in hurling and another hurling All Star Award. In 1982 and 1983 Murphy won a further two Munster hurling medals, but faced defeat in the All-Ireland finals against Kilkenny. He retired from inter-county hurling following the second defeat. He finished off his playing career by winning two more All-Ireland club titles with Nemo Rangers in 1982 and 1984.

== Personal life ==
Following his retirement from play, Murphy, a Garda based in Kilkenny, has remained active in local GAA. He was a selector on the O'Loughlin Gaels club in Kilkenny when his son, also called Brian, won a Leinster Senior Club Hurling Championship title in 2003. He was in the Gardaí for 38 years and was also promoted to detective. He is now chairman.. His great-nephew Finn Azaz plays soccer for Middlesbrough and the Republic of Ireland national team.

== Honours ==
=== Team ===
Coláiste Chríost Rí

- All-Ireland Senior Colleges' Football Championship (1): 1970 (c)
- Munster Senior Colleges' Football Championship (1): 1970 (c)
- Munster Senior Colleges' Hurling Championship (1): 1968

Nemo Rangers

- All-Ireland Senior Club Football Championship (4): 1973, 1979 (c), 1982, 1984
- Munster Senior Club Football Championship (6): 1972, 1974, 1975, 1978 (c), 1981, 1983
- Cork Senior Club Football Championship (7): 1972, 1974, 1975, 1977, 1978 (c), 1981, 1983
- Cork Intermediate Hurling Championship (1): 1971

Cork

- All-Ireland Senior Football Championship (1): 1973
- All-Ireland Senior Hurling Championship (3): 1976, 1977, 1978
- Munster Senior Hurling Championship (7): 1972, 1975, 1976, 1977, 1979, 1982, 1983
- Munster Senior Football Championship (2): 1973, 1974
- National Hurling League (3): 1971–72, 1979–80, 1980–81
- All-Ireland Under-21 Hurling Championship (2): 1971, 1973
- Munster Under-21 Hurling Championship (2): 1971 (sub), 1973
- All-Ireland Under-21 Football Championship (1): 1971
- Munster Under-21 Football Championship (1): 1971
- All-Ireland Minor Hurling Championship (2): 1969 (sub), 1970
- Munster Minor Hurling Championship (2): 1969 (sub), 1970
- All-Ireland Minor Football Championship (1): 1969
- Munster Minor Football Championship (1): 1969

Munster

- Railway Cup Hurling (1): 1981
- Railway Cup Football (4): 1975 (sub), 1976, 1977, 1978

Sporting positions
Preceded by Jimmy Barry-Murphy	Cork Senior Football Captain; 1978–1979	Succeeded by Christy Ryan
Achievements
Preceded by John O'Keeffe	All-Ireland Senior Colleges' Football Final winning captain 1970	Succeeded by Gerry McHugh
Preceded by Richie Bell	All-Ireland Senior Club Football Final winning captain 1979	Succeeded by Christy Ryan
