= 2004 Cork Intermediate Football Championship =

Gaelic football competition

- Sponsor: Permanent TSB
- Champions: Nemo Rangers (4th title); Ivan Gibbons (captain)
- Runners-up: Carbery Rangers; Johnny Murphy (captain)

The 2004 Cork Intermediate Football Championship was the 69th staging of the Cork Intermediate Football Championship since its establishment by the Cork County Board in 1909.

The final was played on 7 November 2004 at Páirc Uí Rinn in Cork, between Nemo Rangers and Carbery Rangers, in what was their first ever meeting in the final. Nemo Rangers won the match by 3–06 to 1–10 to claim their fourth championship title overall and a first title in two years.

== Results ==
=== Final ===
| 7 November 2004 Final | Nemo Rangers | 3-06 - 1-10 | Carbery Rangers | Páirc Uí Rinn |
| | N O'Sullivan 1-0, M Morgan 1-0, S Marshall 1-0, W Morgan 0-2, P O'Shea, O Weldon, A Hogan and J Kerins 0-1 each. | | M Moore 1-0 (1-0 from penalty), K McMahon 0-2; M O'Sullivan 0-2, S Hayes 0-2, D Hayes, M Ronan, J Hayes (free), J Murphy (free) 0-1 each. |
