= 1984–85 All-Ireland Senior Club Football Championship =

Irish Football Championship

- Teams: 33
- Champions: Castleisland Desmonds (1st title)
- Runners-up: St Vincent's

The 1984–85 All-Ireland Senior Club Football Championship was the 15th staging of the All-Ireland Senior Club Football Championship since its establishment by the Gaelic Athletic Association in 1970-71.

Nemo Rangers were the defending champions, however, they failed to qualify after being beaten by Carbery in the 1984 Cork County Championship.

On 24 March 1985, Castleisland Desmonds won the championship following a 2–02 to 0–07 defeat of St Vincent's in the All-Ireland final at Seán Treacy Park. It remains their only championship title.

== Munster ==
=== First round ===
28 October 1984 First round	Fethard	1-10 - 1-06	Claughaun	Barracks Field
	N Sharpe 1-0, M Healy 0-2, M Harrington 0-2, J Keane 0-2, M Fitzgerald 0-1, D Burke 0-1, B Burke 0-1, AB Kennedy 0-1.		J Fitzgerald 1-4, M Molyneaux 0-1, D O'Brien 0-1.

17 November 1984 First round	St Senan's	1-05 - 1-09	St Finbarr's	Páirc Naomh Seanáin

=== Semi-finals ===
8 December 1984 Semi-final	St Finbarr's	1-16 - 0-04	Tramore	Páirc Uí Chaoimh
	T Power 1-3, K McCarthy 0-4, J Allen 0-3, T Leahy 0-2, R Kenny 0-2, M Slocum 0-1, D Philpott 0-1.		J Purcell 0-1, R Prendeville 0-1, L Power 0-1, L Fardy 0-1.

9 December 1984 Semi-final	Fethard	1-08 - 3-07	Castleisland Desmonds	Barracks Field
	J Keane 0-5, T Sheehan 1-0, M Harrington 0-1, P Harrington 0-1, M Healy 0-1.		M Downey 1-4, P Horan 1-1, W O'Connor 1-0, D Lyons 0-1, J Lordan 0-1.

=== Final ===
23 December 1984 Final	Castleisland Desmonds	2-06 - 0-09	St Finbarr's	Bruff Sportsfield
	P Horan 1-2, W O'Connor 1-0, M O'Connor 0-1, M Downey 0-1, C Kearney 0-1, D Lyne 0-1.		T Leahy 0-3, J Allen 0-2, R Kenny 0-2, C Ryan 0-1, K McCarthy 0-1.

== Quarter-final ==
16 December 1984 Quarter-final	Clann na nGael	0-11 - 0-05	Parnells	Páirc Chiaráin

== Semi-finals ==
24 February 1985 Semi-final	Burren	0-08 - 2-05	St Vincent's	St Mary's Park

24 February 1985 Semi-final	Castleisland Desmonds	1-04 - 0-07	Clann na nGael	Castleisland Desmonds Park

18 March 1985 Semi-final replay	Clann na nGael	0-08 - 2-06	Castleisland Desmonds	Páirc Chiaráin

== Final ==
24 March 1985 Final	Castleisland Desmonds	2-02 - 0-07	St Vincent's	Seán Treacy Park
