= Jack Gargan (hurler) =

Irish hurler

Personal information
- Native name: Seán Ó Gargáin (Irish)
- Born: 8 November 1918 Kilkenny, Ireland
- Died: 1991 (aged 72) Los Angeles, United States
- Height: 5 ft 9 in (175 cm)

Sport
- Sport: Hurling
- Position: Left wing-forward
Clubs
- Years: Club
- Éire Óg; Faughs
Club titles
- Kilkenny titles: 2
Inter-county
- Years: County
- 1939-1946 1947: Kilkenny; Dublin
Inter-county titles
- Leinster titles: 4
- All-Irelands: 1
- NHL: 0

John Gargan (8 November 1918 – 1991) was an Irish hurler who played as a left wing-forward for the Kilkenny and Dublin senior teams.

Gargan made his first appearance for the Kilkenny team during the 1939 championship and was a regular on the inter-county scene until his retirement from Dublin after the 1947 championship. During that time he won one All-Ireland medal and four Leinster medals.

At club level Gargan enjoyed successful spells with Éire Óg and Faughs.

Gargan's father, Matt, won six All-Ireland medals with Kilkenny between 1907 and 1913, while his nephew, Frank Cogan, won an All-Ireland medal in football with Cork in 1973.
