= 1982–83 All-Ireland Senior Club Football Championship =

Irish Football Championship

- Teams: 33
- Champions: Portlaoise (1st title)
- Runners-up: Clann na nGael

The 1982–83 All-Ireland Senior Club Football Championship was the 13th staging of the All-Ireland Senior Club Football Championship since its establishment by the Gaelic Athletic Association in 1970-71.

Nemo Rangers were the defending champions, however, they failed to qualify after being beaten by Duhallow in the 1982 Cork County Championship.

On 20 March 1983, Portlaoise won the championship following a 0–12 to 2–00 defeat of Clann na nGael in the All-Ireland final at MacDonagh Park. It remains their only championship title.

== Munster ==
=== First round ===
30 October 1982 First round	Stradbally	0-04 - 1-11	Clonmel Commercials	Páirc Uí Chuimín
	E O'Brien 0-3, S Aherne 0-1.		G McGrath 1-1, F Kelly 0-3, J McNamara 0-2, W Peters 0-2, M Boland 0-1, S Lonergan 0-1, F Kavanagh 0-1.	Referee: D O'Connor (Cork)

14 November 1982 First round	Claughaun	1-03 - 1-05	Doonbeg	Bruff Sportsfield

=== Semi-finals ===
14 November 1982 Semi-final	Clonmel Commercials	0-04 - 0-04	Castleisland Desmonds	Clonmel Sportsground
	M Boland 0-1, F Kelly 0-1, G McGrath 0-1, W Peters 0-1.		P Horan 0-2, W O'Connor 0-1, T Lynch 0-1.

12 December 1982 Semi-final	Doonbeg	0-09 - 3-09	St Finbarr's	Cusack Park
	G Killeen 0-6, T Tubridy 0-3.		J Allen 2-1, J O'Callaghan 0-4, F O'Mahony 1-0, G Desmond 0-1, T Leahy 0-1, D Barr 0-1, D Brosnan 0-1.

19 December 1982 Semi-final replay	Castleisland Desmonds	1-07 - 0-06	Clonmel Commercials	Páirc Naomh Breandán
	D Buckley 1-0, W O'Connor 0-2, P Horan 0-2, E O'Connor 0-1, C Kearney 0-1, T Lynch 0-1.		F Kelly 0-3, D O'Keeffe 0-2, M Boland 0-1.

=== Finals ===
23 January 1983 Final	St Finbarr's	0-11 - 1-08	Castleisland Desmonds	Bruff Sportsfield
	J O'Callaghan 0-4, D Barry 0-2, T Leahy 0-2, J Allen 0-1, T O'Reilly 0-1, D Brosnan 0-1.		D Buckley 1-1, E O'Connor 0-3, W O'Connor 0-1, M O'Connor 0-1, B Lyons 0-1, P Horan 0-1.

30 January 1983 Final	St Finbarr's	2-06 - 0-06	Castleisland Desmonds	Bruff Sportsfield
	T O'Reilly 0-4, T Holland 1-0, F O'Mahony 1-0, D Barry 0-1, D Brosnan 0-1.		E O'Connor 0-2, P Horan 0-2, C Kearney 0-1, W O'Connor 0-1.

== Quarter-final ==
6 February 1983 Quarter-final	St Finbarr's	5-21 - 1-06	Hugh O'Neill's	Neenan Park

== Semi-finals ==
6 March 1983 Semi-final	Portlaoise	0-07 - 0-06	St Finbarr's	McCann Park

6 March 1983 Semi-final	Clann na nGael	3-06 - 2-08	St Gall's	Páirc Chiaráin

Final

20 March 1983 Final	Portlaoise	0-12 - 2-00	Clann na nGael	MacDonagh Park

== Statistics ==
=== Miscellaneous ===
- Clann na nGael won the Connacht Club Championship title for the first time in their history.
- Portlaoise became the first team to win three Leinster Club Championship titles.
