= 1980 Cork Intermediate Football Championship =

Gaelic football competition

- Champions: Nemo Rangers (2nd title); Noel Morgan (captain)
- Runners-up: Midleton

The 1980 Cork Intermediate Football Championship was the 45th staging of the Cork Intermediate Football Championship since its establishment by the Cork County Board in 1909.

The final was played on 14 September 1980 at Páirc Uí Chaoimh in Cork, between Nemo Rangers and Midleton, in what was their first ever meeting in the final. Nemo Rangers won the match by 2-06 to 1-04 to claim their second championship title overall and a first championship title in 52 years.

== Results ==
=== Semi-finals ===
26 July 1980 Semi-final	Nemo Rangers	1-09 - 0-07	MItchelstown	Felix Sarsfield Memorial Park

31 August 1980 Semi-final	Midleton	1-12 - 0-08	Douglas	Riverstown Sportsfield

=== Final ===
14 September 1980 Final	Nemo Rangers	2-06 - 1-04	Midleton	Páirc Uí Chaoimh
	J Barrett 2-0, D Murphy 0-2, C Murphy 0-1, C McLoughlin 0-1, N Morgan 0-1, M Niblock 0-1.		G Glavin 1-0, W Glavin 0-2, K Hennessy 0-1, C O'Neill 0-1.	Referee: M Brosnan (Caheragh)
