= 2002 Cork Intermediate Football Championship =

Gaelic football competition

- Sponsor: Permanent TSB
- Champions: Nemo Rangers (3rd title); Stephen Calnan (captain)
- Runners-up: Newmarket

The 2002 Cork Intermediate Football Championship was the 67th staging of the Cork Intermediate Football Championship since its establishment by the Cork County Board in 1909.

The final was played on 15 September 2002 at the Castle Grounds in Macroom, between Nemo Rangers and Newmarket, in what was their first ever meeting in the final. Nemo Rangers won the match by 2–09 to 0–10 to claim their third championship title overall and a first title in 22 years.

== Results ==
=== Final ===
| 15 September 2002 Final | Nemo Rangers | 2-09 - 0-10 | Newmarket | Castle Grounds |
