= 1957 Cork Junior Football Championship =

Irish hurling competition

- Champions: Nemo Rangers (1st title)
- Runners-up: Mitchelstown

The 1957 Cork Junior Football Championship was the 59th staging of the Cork Junior Football Championship since its establishment by the Cork County Board in 1895.

The final was played on 24 November 1957 at the Athletic Grounds in Fermoy, between Nemo Rangers and Mitchelstown, in what was their first ever meeting in the final. Nemo Rangers won the match by 1–05 to 0–05 to claim their first ever championship title.

== Results ==
=== Final ===
24 November 1957 Final	Nemo Rangers	5–06 – 0–05	Mitchelstown	Fermoy Athletic Grounds
