= 1971 Cork Intermediate Hurling Championship =

Irish hurling competition

- Date: 11 April - 7 November 1971
- Teams: 15
- Champions: Nemo Rangers (3rd title); Frank Cogan (captain)
- Runners-up: Carrigtwohill; Michael Sheehan (captain)

Tournament statistics
- Matches played: 15
- Goals scored: 93 (6.2 per match)
- Points scored: 264 (17.6 per match)

The 1971 Cork Intermediate Hurling Championship was the 62nd staging of the Cork Intermediate Hurling Championship since its establishment by the Cork County Board in 1909. The draw for the opening round fixtures took place on 30 January 1972. The championship began on 11 April 1971 and ended on 7 November 1971.

On 7 November 1971, Nemo Rangers won the championship following a 4–11 to 2–03 defeat of Carrigtwohill in a final replay. This was their third championship title overall and their first title since 1928.

== Team changes ==
=== To Championship ===
Promoted from the Cork Junior Hurling Championship

- Cloughduv

Entered their second team

- Blackrock

=== From Championship ===
Promoted to the Cork Senior Hurling Championship

- Cloyne

Regraded to North Cork Junior A Hurling Championship

- Kilworth

== Results ==
=== First round ===
11 April 1971 First round	Newtownshandrum	2-10 - 4-10	Nemo Rangers	Castletownroche GAA Grounds
	A Noonan 1-4, P Morrissey 0-4, P Herlihy 1-0, M Naughton 0-1, J Buckley 0-1.		J Barrett 1-4, J O'Leary 1-1, S Buckley 1-1, P McCarthy 1-0, W Cogan 0-1, S Coughlan 0-1, D Allen 0-1, C O'Donovan 0-1.

11 April 1971 First round	Kanturk	1-03 - 3-17	Midleton	Páirc Mac Gearailt

25 April 1971 First round	Brian Dillons	1-03 - 4-08	Carrigtwohill	Páirc Uí Chonaill

16 May 1971 First round	Tracton	3-10 - 2-05	Mallow	Cork Athletic Grounds

4 June 1971 First round	Blackrock	5-08 - 3-02	Shamrocks	Carrigaline Park

5 June 1971 First round	Ballincollig	2-08 - 2-11	Glen Rovers	Ballincollig GAA Grounds

6 June 1971 First round	Cobh	4-07 - 2-15	Cloughduv	Cork Athletic Grounds

- Castletownroche received a bye in this round.

=== Quarter-finals ===
11 July 1971 Quarter-final	Blackrock	5-08 - 2-13	Midleton	Carrigtwohill GAA Grounds
	J Redmond 2-0, E O'Donoghue 1-3, S Geary 1-0, R Cummins 1-0, P Casey 0-2, P Doyle 0-1, W Cronin 0-1, A Creagh 0-1.		W Glavin 0-7, T O'Mahony 1-0, J O'Lomasney 1-0, P Fitzgerald 0-2, M Parker 0-2, W Coad 0-1, M O'Brien 0-1.

11 July 1971 Quarter-final	Tracton	3-04 - 0-18	Cloughduv	Courcey Rovers GAA Grounds

18 July 1971 Quarter-final	Glen Rovers	3-09 - 4-12	Carrigtwohill	Riverstown Sportsfield
	P Murphy 1-6, P McCarthy 2-1, M O'Halloran 0-1, D Carroll 0-1.		M Sheehan 1-10, O O'Connor 2-1, M Roche 1-0, S Barry 0-1.

30 July 1971 Quarter-final	Nemo Rangers	3-10 - 3-03	Castletownroche	Castlelyons GAA Grounds

=== Semi-finals ===
8 August 1971 Semi-final	Carrigtwohill	4-14 - 5-07	Blackrock	Riverstown Sportsfield
	M Sheehan 1-8, S Barry 1-2, MJ Roche 1-2, T Browne 1-2,		J Rothwell 3-0, J Redmond 1-2, E O'Donoghue 1-0, A Creagh 0-3, G Buckley 0-1, K Cummins 0-.

3 October 1971 Semi-final	Nemo Rangers	3-13 - 2-08	Cloughduv	Ballinhassig GAA Grounds
	D Allen 1-7, S Buckley 1-0, S Coughlan 1-0, B Morgan 0-3, N Morgan 0-1, B Cogan 0-1, J Leary 0-1.		C Kelly 1-5, P Lucey 1-0, N Dunne 0-1, G Kelly 0-1, S Cunningham 0-1.

=== Final ===
31 October 1971 Final	Nemo Rangers	4-13 - 8-01	Carrigtwohill	Páirc Uí Chonaill
	B Morgan 1-8, D Allen 3-0, S Coughlan 0-2, F Cogan 0-2, N Morgan 0-1.		Michael "Fox" Sheehan 6-1. Two goals were scored from melees.

7 November 1971 Final replay	Nemo Rangers	4-11 - 2-03	Carrigtwohill	Páirc Uí Chonaill
	D Calnan 2-2, D Allen 1-2, N Morgan 1-1, B Morgan 0-3, S Buckley 0-2, S Coughlan 0-1.		P O'Connor 1-0, ML Roche 1-0, M Sheehan 0-1, S Barry 0-1, T Brown 0-1.
