= 1971 Cork Intermediate Football Championship =

Gaelic football competition

- Dates: 16 May – 19 September 1971
- Teams: 11
- Champions: Newcestown (1st title)
- Runners-up: St. Finbarr's

Tournament statistics
- Matches played: 11
- Goals scored: 38 (3.45 per match)
- Points scored: 194 (17.64 per match)

The 1971 Cork Intermediate Football Championship was the 36th staging of the Cork Intermediate Football Championship since its establishment by the Cork County Board in 1909. The draw for the opening round fixtures took place on 31 January 1971. The championship began on 16 May 1971 and ended on 19 September 1971.

The final was played on 19 September 1971 at Cloughduv GAA Grounds, between Newcestown and St. Finbarr's, in what was their first-ever final meeting. Newcestown won the match by 2-11 to 3-02 to claim their first-ever championship title.

== Results ==
=== First round ===
16 May 1971 First round	St. Vincent's	2-07 - 2-11	Canovee	Ballincollig GAA Grounds

11 June 1971 First round	St. Finbarr's	2-11 - 2-01	St. Nicholas'

20 June 1971 First round	St. Michael's	2-06 - 2-10	Dohenys	Charlie Hurley Park

=== Quarter-finals ===
16 May 1971 Quarter-final	Cobh	2-10 - 2-10	Newmarket	Castletownroche GAA Grounds

16 May 1971 Quarter-final	Youghal	1-04 - 2-12	Newcestown	Cork Athletic Grounds

20 June 1971 Quarter-final replay	Cobh	1-14 - 0-11	Newmarket	O'Connell Park

25 July 1971 Quarter-final	Canovee	0-07 - 0-09	Dohenys	St. Mary's Grounds

31 July 1971 Quarter-final	St. Finbarr's	2-13 - 2-07	Kilmurry	Coachford Sportsfield

=== Semi-finals ===
25 July 1971 Semi-final	Newcestown	2-13 - 0-11	Cobh	Cork Athletic Grounds

14 August 1971 Semi-final	St. Finbarr's	4-06 - 3-08	Dohenys	Cloughduv GAA Grounds

=== Final ===
19 September 1971 Final	Newcestown	2-11 - 3-02	St. Finbarr's	Cloughduv GAA Grounds
				Referee: F Halbert (Glenville)
