= 1928 Cork Intermediate Hurling Championship =

Irish hurling competition

- Champions: Nemo Rangers (1st title); G. O'Connor (captain)
- Runners-up: Buttevant

The 1928 Cork Intermediate Hurling Championship was the 19th staging of the Cork Intermediate Hurling Championship since its establishment by the Cork County Board.

The final was played on 21 October 1928 at the Athletic Grounds in Cork, between Nemo Rangers and Buttevant, in what was their first ever meeting in the final. Nemo Rangers won the match by 5–07 to 0–00 to claim their first ever championship title.

== Results ==
=== Final ===
21 October 1928 Final	Nemo Rangers	5-07 - 0-00	Buttevant	Cork Athletic Grounds
