= 1928 Cork Intermediate Football Championship =

Gaelic football competition

- Champions: Nemo Rangers (1st title)
- Runners-up: Kilmurry

The 1928 Cork Intermediate Football Championship was the 19th staging of the Cork Intermediate Football Championship since its establishment by the Cork County Board in 1909.

The final was played on 28 October 1928 at the Athletic Grounds in Ballincollig, between Nemo Rangers and Kilmurry, in what was their first ever meeting in the final. Nemo Rangers won the match by 2–03 to 0–01 to claim their first ever championship title.

== Results ==
=== Final ===
28 October 1928 Final	Nemo Rangers	2-03 - 0-01	Kilmurry	Ballincollig Athletic Grounds
