= 1981 Cork Senior Football Championship =

Gaelic football competition

- Dates: 26 April – 4 October 1981
- Teams: 23
- Champions: Nemo Rangers (6th title); Billy Morgan (captain); Billy Morgan (manager)
- Runners-up: Bantry Blues; Vincent McCarthy (captain); Pat Spillane (manager)

Tournament statistics
- Matches played: 27
- Goals scored: 63 (2.33 per match)
- Points scored: 423 (15.67 per match)
- Top scorer(s): Pat O'Driscoll (2-31)

The 1981 Cork Senior Football Championship was the 93rd staging of the Cork Senior Football Championship since its establishment by the Cork County Board in 1887. The championship began on 26 April 1981 and ended on 4 October 1981.

St. Finbarr's entered the championship as the defending champions, however, they were defeated by Nemo Rangers at the semi-final stage.

On 4 October 1981, Nemo Rangers won the championship following a 3-11 to 0-06 defeat of Bantry Blues in the final. This was their sixth championship title overall and their first title since 1978.

Pat O'Driscoll was the championship's top scorer with 2-31.

== Format change ==
At the County Convention on 25 January 1981, it was decided to introduce a new graded draw with divisional, rural and city clubs all being grouped individually. The winners of the first two groupings progressed to one semi-final, with two of the city teams qualifying for the other semi-final. The new format was introduced to guarantee a city-county pairing in the final.

== Results ==
=== Divisional section ===
26 April 1981 Round 1	Duhallow	2-05 - 1-09	Seandún	Ballyanly
	J O'Keeffe 1-2, G O'Sullivan 1-0, P O'Connor 0-2, N O'Connor 0-1.		K O'Reilly 1-0, E Forde 0-3, J O'Sullivan 0-2, M Tobin 0-1, G Murphy 0-1, F Taltan 0-1, D McCarthy 0-1.

26 April 1981 Round 1	Imokilly	2-09 - 1-09	Carbery	Innishannon
	R Swayne 1-1, B Aherne 0-4, S O'Brien 1-0, G Glavin 0-2, K Hennessy 0-1, T Murphy 0-1.		M Connolly 1-3, T Murphy 0-4, P Crowley 0-2.

26 April 1981 Round 1	Beara	0-07 - 1-12	Muskerry	Wolfe Tone Park, Bantry
	B O'Dwyer 0-2, G Murphy 0-2, S O'Sullivan 0-1, F McCarthy 0-1, J Murphy 0-1.		S Murphy 0-4, D Walsh 0-3, L Goold 0-2, M Mehigan 0-1, V Coakley 0-1, T O'Sullivan 0-1.

26 April 1981 Round 1	Avondhu	3-11 - 0-06	Carrigdhoun	Riverstown
	M Dorney 3-0, D O'Hagan 0-3, J Fouhy 0-2, J Dillon 0-2, T O'Callaghan 0-1, M Dolan 0-1, M Murphy 0-1.		D O'Neill 0-2, E Hanley 0-2, G Murphy 0-1, D Murphy 0-1.

13 June 1981 Round 2	Muskerry	1-08 - 1-06	Avondhu	Kilbrin
	M Mehigan 1-0, D Walsh 0-3, T Creedon 0-2, V Coakley 0-1, L Goold 0-1, D Creedon 0-1.		C Hogan 1-0, M Dorney 0-2, T O'Callaghan 0-1, F O'Grourke 0-1, N Kirby 0-1.

28 June 1981 Round 2	Seandún	2-07 - 1-10	Imokilly	Riverstown
	E Forde 1-2, J O'Sullivan 1-0, M Tobin 0-3, F Thornton 0-2.		R Swayne 1-0, B Ahern 0-3, B Murphy 0-2, G Glavin 0-2, J Fenton 0-1, T Murphy 0-1.

30 July 1981 Round 2 replay	Seandún	0-11 - 1-11	Imokilly	Riverstown
	E Forde 0-3, M Tobin 0-3, K O'Reilly 0-2, F Thornton 0-1, P Harrington 0-1.		T Murphy 1-2, G Glavin 0-4, B Ahern 0-3, R Swayne 0-1, M Walsh 0-1.

=== Rural section ===
3 May 1981 Round 1	Glanworth	1-08 - 1-05	Clonakilty	Páirc Uí Chaoimh, Cork
	B Quinn 1-3, C Aherne 0-3, T Downes 0-1, DJ Ryan 0-1.		J O'Donovan 1-0, C O'Neill 0-1, D McCarthy 0-1, J Good 0-1, R Donovan 0-1, P Griffin 0-1.

3 May 1981 Round 1	Millstreet	3-08 - 1-05	Dohenys	Macroom
	L Buckley 1-2, L Dennehy 1-0, B Kelleher 0-3, B McSweeney 0-3.		B Herlihy 1-1, T Ross 0-2, C O'Rourke 0-1, D Herlihy 0-1.

3 May 1981 Round 1	Naomh Abán	1-01 - 1-04	Castlehaven	Sam Maguire Park, Dunmanway
	P Healy 1-0, D McCarthy 0-1.		B Collins 1-0, A Collins 0-1, C Collins 0-1, B Terry 0-1.

10 May 1981 Round 1	Bantry Blues	0-03 - 0-03	Adrigole	Kealkill
	P O'Driscoll 0-2, P McCarthy 0-1.		KJ O'Sullivan 0-1,

31 May 1981 Round 1 replay	Bantry Blues	0-06 - 1-03	Adrigole	Kealkill
	P O'Driscoll 0-3, J Cotter 0-1.		T Carey 1-0, KJ O'Sullivan 0-2, MJ O'Sullivan 0-1.

21 June 1981 Round 1 2nd replay	Bantry Blues	3-08 - 0-09	Adrigole	Kealkill
	D Barron 2-0, P O'Driscoll 1-2, P McCarthy 0-1, D Hunt 0-1, J Cotter 0-1,		B O'Neill 0-4,	Referee: M Brosnan

7 June 1981 Round 2	Castlehaven	2-06 - 1-05	Glanworth	Páirc Uí Chaoimh, Cork
	D Nolan 2-0, J Cleary 0-4, B Terry 0-1, A Collins 0-1.		DJ Ryan 1-0, B Quinlan 0-3, J O'Brien 0-2.

5 July 1981 Round 2	Bantry Blues	3-12 - 0-10	Millstreet	Ballyvourney
	P O'Driscoll 1-8, D Hunt 2-0, J Cotter 0-3, T Delaney 0-1.		N Crowley 0-4, L Dennehy 0-2, B McSweeney 0-2, T Curtin 0-1, B Kelleher 0-1.	Referee: J Walsh

=== City section ===
9 May 1981 Round 1	Nemo Rangers	2-13 - 1-08	St. Nicholas	Páirc Uí Chaoimh, Cork
	M Dorgan 1-2, D Allen 0-5, E Fitzgerald 1-1, T Dalton 0-4, S Hayes 0-1.		L Mulcahy 0-4, T O'Brien 1-0, J Nuckley 0-2, J O'Callaghan 0-1, P O'Doherty 0-1.

9 May 1981 Round 1	St. Finbarr's	6-10 - 0-07	Na Piarsaigh	Ballinlough
	J O'Callaghan 2-3, T Holland 1-2, D Barry 1-1, M Lynch 1-0, F O'Mahony 1-0, J Barry-Murphy 0-3, J Cremin 0-1.		J O'Sullivan 0-4, D Murphy 0-1, F Buckley 0-1, R McDonald 0-1.

31 May 1981 Round 1	Bishopstown	0-09 - 1-06	St Michael's	Páirc Uí Chaoimh, Cork
	T O'Reilly 0-6, E Murphy 0-2, C Coffey 0-1.		P Crowley 1-1, E o'Donoghue 0-2, F O'Neill 0-1, M Kilcoyne 0-1, T Murphy 0-1.

11 July 1981 Round 1 replay	Bishopstown	1-09 - 2-11 (aet)	St Michael's	Páirc Uí Chaoimh, Cork
	G McCarthy 0-4, C Coffey 1-0, E Murphy 0-2, J Walsh 0-1, T Hayes 0-1, P O'Neill 0-1.		T Cashman 1-1, E O'Donoghue 1-1, F Delaney 0-4, D Buckley 0-2, M Kilcoyne 0-1, C O'Leary 0-1, B Field 0-1.

=== Quarter-finals ===
24 July 1981 Quarter-final	University College Cork	0-02 - 2-14	Nemo Rangers	Bishopstown
	T Kiely 0-1, M Downes 0-1.		T Dalton 1-2, E Fitzgerald 0-5, M Dorgan 1-0, D Allen 0-2, Colm Murphy 0-2, Charlie Murphy 0-1, S Hayes 0-1, M Niblock 0-1.

26 July 1981 Quarter-final	Bantry Blues	1-08 - 0-11	Castlehaven	Rossa Park, Skibbereen
	P O'Driscoll 0-5, R Dix 1-0, T Delaney 0-1, D Barron 0-1, F Lynch 0-1.		J Cleary 0-6, M Burns 0-2, A Collins 0-1, TJ O'Regan 0-1, F Collins 0-1.

1 August 1981 Quarter-final replay	Bantry Blues	2-11 - 1-06	Castlehaven	Rossa Park, Skibbereen
	P O'Driscoll 0-6, D Hunt 1-1, D Barron 1-0, P McCarthy 0-2, T Delaney 0-2.		B Terry 1-3, J Cleary 0-2, F Collins 0-1.

1 August 1981 Quarter-final	St. Finbarr's	2-12 - 1-11	St Michael's	Páirc Uí Chaoimh, Cork
	F O'Mahony 1-1, M Lynch 1-0, J O'Callaghan 0-3, T Holland 0-2, D Barry 0-2, C Ryan 0-2, D Brosnan 0-1, J Barry 0-1.		D Buckley 0-9, T Cashman 1-0, R Cummins 0-1, F Delaney 0-1.

9 August 1981 Quarter-final	Muskerry	0-10 - 0-06	Imokilly	Páirc Uí Chaoimh, Cork
	L Goold 0-3, M Mehigan 0-2, T Creedon 0-1, D Creedon 0-1, S Murphy 0-1, T O'Sullivan 0-1, G Fitzgerald 0-1.		G Galvin 0-3, S O'Brien 0-2, R Swayne 0-1.

=== Semi-finals ===
16 August 1981 Semi-final	Nemo Rangers	1-10 - 2-03	St. Finbarr's	Páirc Uí Chaoimh, Cork
	D Allen 0-8, S Hayes 1-1, C Murphy 0-1.		F O'Mahony 2-0, D Brosnan 0-1, C Ryan 0-1, J Barry-Murphy 0-1.

23 August 1981 Semi-final	Bantry Blues	1-06 - 0-06	Muskerry	Sam Maguire Park, Dunmanway
	D Barron 1-2, P O'Driscoll 0-2, F Carroll 0-1, D Hunt 0-1.		L Goold 0-3, G Fitzgerald 0-2, S Murphy 0-1.

=== Final ===
4 October 1981 Final	Nemo Rangers	3-11 - 0-06	Bantry Blues	Páirc Uí Chaoimh, Cork
	E Fitzgerald 2-1, S Hayes 1-1, M Dorgan 0-4, D Allen 0-3, C Murphy 0-2.		P O'Driscoll 0-3, D Hunt 0-2, J Cotter 0-1.	Attendance: 7,227; Referee: J Dennigan

== Championship statistics ==
=== Top scorers ===
Overall

Rank	Player	Club	Tally	Total	Matches	Average
1	Pat O'Driscoll	Bantry Blues	2-31	37	8	4.62
2	Dinny Allen	Nemo Rangers	0-18	18	4	4.50
3	Ephie Fitzgerald	Nemo Rangers	3-07	16	4	4.00
4	Declan Barron	Bantry Blues	4-03	15	8	1.87
5	Donal Hunt	Bantry Blues	3-05	14	8	1.75

In a single game

Rank	Player	Club	Tally	Total	Opposition
1	Pat O'Driscoll	Bantry Blues	1-08	11	Millstreet
2	Martin Dorney	Avondhu	3-00	9	Carrigdhoun
2	Jamesie O'Callaghan	St. Finbarr's	2-03	9	Na Piarsaigh
2	Danny Buckley	St. Michael's	0-09	9	St. Finbarr's
5	Dinny Allen	Nemo Rangers	2-02	8	St. Finbarr's
6	Ephie Fitzgerald	Nemo Rangers	2-01	7	Bantry Blues
7	Declan Barron	Bantry Blues	2-00	6	Adrigole
7	Denis Nolan	Castlehaven	2-00	6	Glanworth
7	Donal Hunt	Bantry Blues	2-00	6	Millstreet
7	Finny O'Mahony	St. Finbarr's	2-00	6	Nemo Rangers
7	Brendan Terry	Castlehaven	1-03	6	Bantry Blues
7	Martin Connolly	Carbery	1-03	6	Imokilly
7	Brian Quinlan	Glanworth	1-03	6	Castlehaven
7	Tadhg O'Reilly	Bishopstown	0-06	6	St. Michael's
7	John Cleary	Castlehaven	0-06	6	Bantry Blues
7	Pat O'Driscoll	Bantry Blues	0-06	6	Castlehaven

=== Miscellaneous ===
- Bantry Blues qualify for the final for the first time since 1909.
