= Billy Morgan (Gaelic footballer) =

Irish Gaelic football manager and player

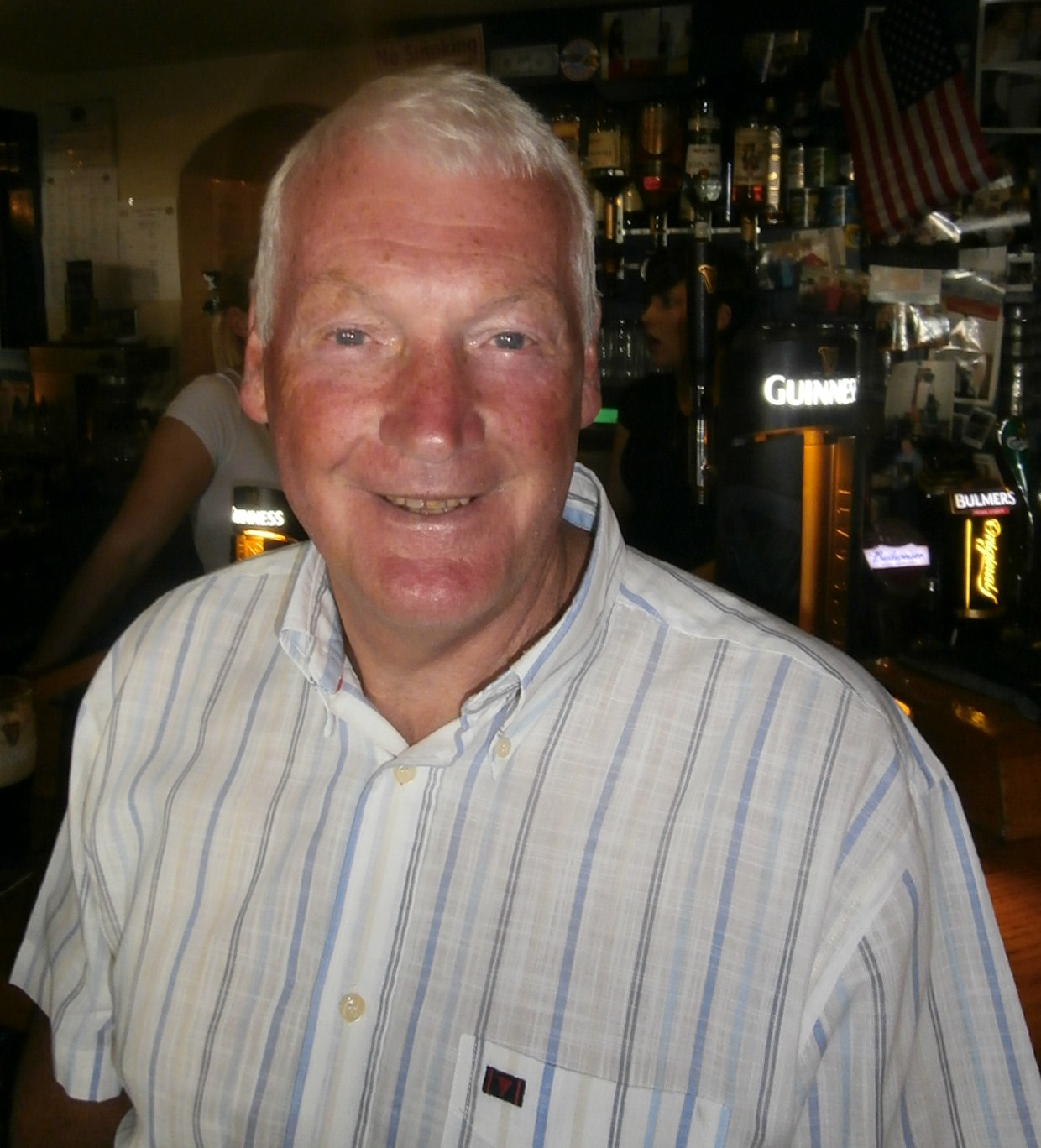

Personal information
- Native name: Liam Ó Morgáin (Irish)
- Born: 2 February 1945 (age 81) Tonyville Terrace, Cork, Ireland
- Occupation: Financial advisor
- Height: 5 ft 10 in (178 cm)

Sport
- Sport: Gaelic football
- Position: Goalkeeper
Club
- Years: Club
- 1969-1995: Nemo Rangers
Club titles
- Cork titles: 7
- Munster titles: 4
- All-Ireland Titles: 2
College
- Years: College
- 1964–1968: University College Cork
College titles
- Sigerson titles: 2
Inter-county
Years	County	Apps (scores)
1966–1981	Cork	40 (0–0)
Inter-county titles
- Munster titles: 5
- All-Irelands: 1
- NFL: 1
- All Stars: 1

William Morgan (born 2 February 1945) is an Irish former Gaelic football manager who played as goalkeeper at senior level for the Cork county team, and later managed it. His five-decade-long association with the team has led to him being regarded as one of the most iconic figures within Cork football.

Born in Cork, Morgan was introduced to Gaelic games by his father, a native of County Galway who had played hurling at junior level with the county. He came to prominence with Coláiste Chríost Rí before winning back-to-back Sigerson Cup medals with University College Cork. A two-time All-Ireland medallist with the Nemo Rangers senior team, Morgan also won four Munster medals and seven championship medals.

Morgan made his debut on the inter-county scene at the age of eighteen when he first linked up with the Cork minor team. He enjoyed an unsuccessful tenure in this grade, and was later an All-Ireland runner-up with the under-21 team. Morgan made his senior debut during the 1966 championship. He went on to play a key role for Cork as a goalkeeper during a successful era, and won one All-Ireland medal, five Munster medals and one National Football League medal. An All-Ireland runner-up on one occasion, Morgan captained the team to All-Ireland victory in 1973.

As a member of the Munster inter-provincial team, Morgan won four Railway Cup medals. Throughout his inter-county career he made 40 championship appearances. Morgan retired from inter-county football following the conclusion of the 1981 championship.

Morgan has enjoyed success at all grades as a coach and selector with Nemo Rangers and University College Cork, however, it was as manager of the Cork senior team that he enjoyed his greatest triumphs. As manager on three separate occasions he guided Cork through a period of unprecedented provincial and national dominance, winning fourteen major honours. These include two All-Ireland Championships, the first time Cork claimed back-to-back titles, eight Munster Championships, two National Leagues, including one league-championship double, and two McGrath Cups.

== Biography ==
Billy Morgan was born in Douglas on the south side of Cork city in 1945. He was born into a household that, ironically, had a strong hurling tradition. Both his parents were from County Galway and, from an early age, Morgan's dream was to play hurling for Cork. Over time, however, he became interested in Gaelic football. Morgan was educated at the Coláiste Chríost Rí school and later attended University College Cork. Here Morgan made a name for himself as a goalkeeper and became a key member of the university's football team. In 1966 he won a Sigerson Cup winners' medal as UCC defeated University College Galway (UCG) in the inter-varsities tournament. A second consecutive defeat of UCG in 1967 gave Morgan a second Sigerson Cup title.

Morgan later worked as a secondary school teacher, before travelling to New York University in the early 1980s to complete a master's degree in physical education. He also ran a pub in the centre of Cork city for a period and he currently works as a financial adviser with his son Brian Morgan and with his nephew William Morgan. Both of these younger Morgan's have followed in Billy's football footsteps and have had successes with Nemo Rangers. Morgan's second son, Alan Morgan, also plays football with the club and regularly comes off the bench.

According to Colm O'Rourke in his Sunday Independent column of 15 November 2020, Morgan had recently been seriously ill after contracting COVID-19.

== Playing career ==
=== Club ===
Morgan played his club football with Nemo Rangers club. He lined out in his first senior county championship final in 1970, however, Muskerry defeated Nemo in their first final appearance. Two years later in 1972 Morgan was captain of the team when he captured that elusive county winners' medal when Nemo Rangers defeated UCC. Nemo's march to success continued later in the year as the club captured the Munster club title before Morgan lined out in the All-Ireland final. St. Vincent's of Dublin provided the opposition, however, a late Jimmy Keaveney point forced a draw and a replay. First-half goals in the replay by Jimmy Barrett and Billy Cogan were followed by two more Liam Goode and Séamus Coughlan goals in the second-half. The final score of 4–6 to 0–10 gave Morgan a first All-Ireland club winners' medal and the honour of collecting the cup on behalf of his club.

Two years later in 1974 Morgan added a second county championship winners' medal to his collection. A second Munster club title followed, before Nemo booked their place in another All-Ireland final. UCD provided the opposition on that occasion, however, Morgan's side were defeated by 1–11 to 0–12. 1975 saw Morgan capture a third county title. A third Munster club winners' medal soon followed, however, Nemo were beaten in the subsequent All-Ireland semi-final.

After surrendering their county title in 1976, Nemo were back the following year with Morgan picking up a fourth county winners' medal. A fifth county championship of the decade followed in 1978 before Morgan collected a fourth Munster club title. The subsequent All-Ireland final pitted Nemo against Scotstown of Monaghan. Snow hampered the game, however, Cogan proved the hero as Nemo won the game by 2–9 to 1–3. It was his second All-Ireland club winners' medal and his last major victory with Nemo.

Morgan remained as a non-playing substitute with Nemo Rangers, as the club secured further county and provincial titles throughout the 1980s.

=== Inter-county ===
By the early 1960s Morgan was a key part of Cork's inter-county set-up and was playing on the county's minor team as an outfield player. He lined out at centre-forward on the Cork team that was beaten by Kerry in the 1963 Munster minor final.

Morgan later joined the county's under-21 team, where he was installed in his favoured position of goalkeeper. He won a Munster title in this grade in 1965, however, Cork were later shocked by Kildare in the All-Ireland final. A 2–11 to 1–7 win for the 'Lilywhites' resulted in Morgan ending up on the losing side.

Following the county under-21 campaign in 1965 Morgan was invited to join the Cork senior football panel. He was the sub-goalie for the 1965–1966 National Football League and made his senior debut in the Munster Championship in 1966. He won his first senior Munster title that year as Cork defeated a Kerry team attempting to capture a record-breaking ninth consecutive provincial title. Cork were subsequently defeated in the All-Ireland semi-final by eventual champions Galway.

In 1967 Morgan secured a second Munster winners' medal as Kerry were defeated by a single point in the provincial decider. Cork went one step further this year and reached the All-Ireland final. Meath were the opponents on that occasion. Cork led by 0–3 to 0–1 after a terrible first half of football; however, Meath's Terry Kearns scored a key goal after the interval. At the final whistle Meath were the champions by 1–9 to 0–9.

After losing their provincial title over the course of the next few years Cork were back in 1971. A 0–25 to 0–14 trouncing of back-to-back All-Ireland champions Kerry gave Morgan a third Munster winners' medal. Cork, however, were later defeated by eventual champions Offaly in the All-Ireland semi-final.

Two years later Morgan became the first Nemo Rangers man to captain the Cork senior football team. That year he secured his fourth and final Munster winners' medal. The 5–12 to 1–15 defeat of arch-rivals Kerry showed the traditional football powers that Cork were coming. The subsequent All-Ireland final pitted Cork against Galway. Teenager Jimmy Barry-Murphy scored the first of his two goals after just two minutes before scored a third for Cork after switching to left wing-forward. At full-time Cork were the champions by 3–17 to 2–13. This victory gave Morgan an All-Ireland winners' medal while he also became the first Cork man since 1945 to lift the Sam Maguire Cup. He was later presented with the Texaco Footballer of the Year award. Morgan remains the only goalkeeper to be presented with that award.

In 1974 Cork proved that their success was not a flash in the pan. A 1–11 to 0–7 defeat gave the county a second consecutive Munster title. It was Morgan's fifth provincial winners' medal in all. A certain amount of over-confidence crept into the side as Cork were subsequently defeated by eventual champions Dublin in the All-Ireland semi-final.

The next seven years saw Morgan's side lose every Munster final to a Kerry team widely regarded as the greatest of all-time. There was some consolation towards the end of his career as Cork won a National League title in 1980. Morgan retired from inter-county football in 1981.

=== Inter-provincial ===
Morgan also lined out with Munster in the inter-provincial football competition and enjoyed much success over the course of a decade. He first lined out with his province in 1967, however, Munster were defeated by Connacht on that occasion. It was the first of four consecutive years of defeats for Morgan and for Munster. After losing his place on the team to Kerry's Johnny Culloty in 1971, Morgan was back the following year. That year he won his first Railway Cup winners' medal as Leinster were accounted for after a replay. After defeat in 1973 and the loss of his place on the team in 1974, Morgan returned to win a second Railway Cup title in 1975. He was a non-playing substitute as Munster when Munster made it two-in-a-row in 1976. Morgan was back as the first-choice goalkeeper for two more Railway Cup wins on 1977 ad 1978.

== Managerial career ==
=== Cork: 1986–1996 ===
Morgan first got a taste of inter-county managerial experience in his last championship season when he was player-manager with Cork. His period in charge ended with defeat in the Munster final of 1981.

Five year later in the autumn of 1986 Morgan was appointed Cork manager for a second time. The task ahead was enormous as Cork's nearest neighbours, Kerry, had won eleven of the last twelve Munster titles and had put Cork to the sword on most of those occasions. In his first year in charge Morgan worked the oracle. The traditional Munster final between Cork and Kerry ended in a draw, however, Cork triumphed over the four-in-a-row hopefuls by 0–13 to 1–5. Cork subsequently qualified for the All-Ireland final with Meath providing the opposition. Midway through the first-half Cork had a goal chance blocked by Mick Lyons when Jimmy Kerrigan looked to be through for a seven-point lead. Instead, it was Meath who led by 1–6 to 0–8 at half-time, courtesy of a Colm O'Rourke goal. Cork's Larry Tompkins's radar was also off course as he missed six out of eight free-kicks. At the full-time whistle Meath were the winners by 1–14 to 0–11.

In 1988 Morgan's team retained their Munster title before a second All-Ireland final appearance beckoned. Meath provided the opposition once again as Cork got off to a good start with a Teddy McCarthy goal. By the end of the game Cork led by a point, however, Brian Stafford scored the equaliser. The replay was a controversial affair. Meath's Gerry McEntee was sent-off after just seven minutes. In spite of being reduced to fourteen men, Meath hung on for a narrow 0–13 to 0–12 victory. It was Morgan's second consecutive defeat as manager.

A third consecutive Munster title was secured in 1989 and, once again, Cork qualified for a third consecutive All-Ireland final. Mayo were the opponents on this occasion and the game was a close affair for much of the opening half. An Anthony Finnerty goal after thirty-eight minutes gave Mayo a brief lead, however, the Connacht champs failed to score for the last nineteen minutes. Teddy McCarthy took control and Cork secured victory by 0–17 to 1–11. It was Morgan's first All-Ireland title as manager and Cork's first since 1973, when Morgan was captain.

In 1990, while still under Morgan's guidance, Cork made it a remarkable four Munster titles on the trot. A fourth consecutive All-Ireland final appearance quickly followed, with old rivals Meath providing the opposition. Cork suffered a blow in the first-half when Colm O'Neill was sent off; however, Shay Fahy was playing a blinder at midfield. In spite of only having fourteen men Cork won the game by 0–11 to 0–9. It was a second consecutive All-Ireland title for Morgan, the first time that Cork had achieved the feat. This victory was all the more special as the Cork hurling team had already won their respective All-Ireland title a fortnight earlier. It was the first time in the modern era that a county had won the hurling and football 'double'.

In 1991 Cork lost their provincial crown to Kerry and Morgan faced a year of difficulties with the Cork County Board. For a period it looked as if he might resign, however, he stayed on only to face defeat again in 1992. Once again the knives were out for him, however, Cork won back to Munster title in 1993. Cork subsequently qualified for the All-Ireland final, with Derry providing the opposition. Things did not go to plan as 'the Rebels' were reduced to fourteen men when Tony Davis was harshly red-carded. Séamus Downey scored the winning goal as Derry secured their first All-Ireland with a 1–14 to 2–8 victory.

In 1994 Morgan managed Cork to a second consecutive Munster winners' medal following another convincing victory over Tipperary. Cork, however, were later defeated by eventual champions Down in the All-Ireland semi-final.

In 1995 Morgan's Cork won a third consecutive Munster title, a record-breaking seventh in nine seasons, as Kerry fell in the provincial decider. Once again Cork were subsequently defeated by eventual All-Ireland champions Dublin in the All-Ireland semi-final.

In 1996 the old order in Munster was restored. Kerry defeated Cork by 0–14 to 0–11 in the Munster final, taking their first provincial title since 1991 in the process. This defeat saw Cork exit the championship and effectively brought Morgan's ten-season tenure as manager to an end.

=== Nemo Rangers: 2000–2003 ===
Morgan has been involved in coaching various Nemo Rangers teams at all levels; however, in the late 1990s he took charge of the club’s senior football team. In 2000 Nemo Rangers broke back after a six-year absence and won the county senior championship following a ten-point defeat of divisional side Carbery. Nemo later represented Cork in the provincial club championship and even reached the final of that competition. A 0–11 to 0–7 defeat of Glenflesk gave the club another Munster club winners' medal. Morgan subsequently guided his team to a foot-and-mouth delayed All-Ireland club final, with Mayo's Crossmolina providing the opposition. Nemo looked to be in the driving seat, however, a second-half comeback, inspired by Kieran McDonald, saw the momentum switch to the Mayo side. A late Colin Corkery goal narrowed the deficit to one point, however, Morgan's side were eventually and narrowly defeated by 0–16 to 1–12.

In 2001 Morgan coached Nemo to a second county championship title as the club trounced Bantry Blues in the final. A second Munster club winners' medal was quickly captured, after a 1–11 to 0–10 defeat of Fethard. Morgan's side subsequently lined out in his second All-Ireland club final, this time with Ballinderry providing the opposition. The championship decider was switched to Semple Stadium because of the reconstruction of Croke Park, however, a change of venue did not suit Nemo. Goals by Gerard Cassidy and Declan Bateson gave the Derry side a comfortable 2–10 to 0–9 victory. It was a second consecutive All-Ireland defeat for Nemo.

2002 saw Nemo becoming the first team in nearly sixty years to win three county championship titles in-a-row. A third consecutive Munster club title quickly followed for Morgan's team, as Nemo trounced Monaleen of Limerick by 4–15 to 0–6. For the third successive year Rangers subsequently lined out in the All-Ireland club final, however, the club faced the unpalatable prospect of becoming three-in-a-row losers. Crossmolina provided the opposition for the second time in three years and the game was a close affair. It was played in Croke Park on St.Patrick's day. Colin Corkery scored six points to give Nemo a merited 0–14 to 1–9 victory. At the third time of asking Morgan had finally guided his club to an All-Ireland club winners' medal.

=== Cork: 2003–2007 ===
In late 2003 Morgan was coaxed back to managing the Cork senior football team, however, his third time in charge saw Cork enjoy some mixed results. Beginning with his first season back, Cork were disappointing in the championship. After exiting the Munster championship at the hands of Kerry, Cork were unceremoniously dumped out of the championship by Fermanagh in the third-round of the All-Ireland qualifiers.

In 2005 Morgan guided his young, new Cork team to a first Munster final appearance under his tenure. Reigning All-Ireland champions Kerry provided the opposition, however, Cork were still off the mark. The 1–11 to 0–10 defeat was not the end of the road as Cork still had another chance to claim the All-Ireland title. Because of the structure of the championship Cork and Kerry met for a second time in the All-Ireland semi-final. That game turned into a rout as Kerry trounced their greatest rivals by 1–19 to 0–9.

In 2006 Morgan's side lined out against Kerry in the Munster final once again. That game ended in a 0–10 apiece draw. The replay saw a much fresher Cork team defeat Kerry by 1–12 to 0–9. James Masters proved the hero of the day, as he scored 1–7. Morgan had finally secured a Munster winners' medal with his new team. The quirks of the championship saw Cork face Kerry again in the subsequent All-Ireland semi-final for the second year in-a-row. In a similar pattern to the two previous encounters Cork failed to beat Kerry at Croke Park. A 0–16 to 0–10 resulted in Morgan's side being dumped out of the championship.

In 2007 Morgan's Cork narrowly lost their Munster crown to Kerry. In spite of the 1–15 to 1–13 defeat Cork still had another chance to claim the All-Ireland title. Cork later did well in the All-Ireland series and finally qualified for the championship decider. It was the seventh time that Morgan was aiding a Cork team in an All-Ireland final, either as a player or as a manager. Kerry, however, were the opponents. While the first half was played on an even keel, 'the Kingdom' ran riot in the second half and a rout ensued. At the full-time whistle Cork were trounced by 3–13 to 1–9. Morgan subsequently stepped down as Cork football manager.

== Honours ==
=== Player ===
University College Cork

- Sigerson Cup (2): 1965, 1966

Nemo Rangers

- All-Ireland Senior Club Football Championship (2): 1973 (c), 1979
- Munster Senior Club Football Championship (4): 1972 (c), 1974, 1975, 1978
- Cork Senior Football Championship (7): 1972 (c), 1974, 1975, 1977, 1978, 1981, 1987

Cork

- All-Ireland Senior Football Championship (1): 1973 (c)
- Munster Senior Football Championship (5): 1966, 1967, 1971, 1973 (c), 1974
- National Football League (1): 1979-80
- Munster Under-21 Football Championship (1): 1965

Munster

- Railway Cup (5): 1972, 1975 (c), 1976 (sub), 1977, 1978

Individual

- In May 2020, the Irish Independent named Morgan as one of the "dozens of brilliant players" who narrowly missed selection for its "Top 20 footballers in Ireland over the past 50 years".

=== Manager ===
University College Cork

- Sigerson Cup (4): 2011, 2014, 2019, 2023

Nemo Rangers

- All-Ireland Senior Club Football Championship (4): 1973, 1979, 1989, 2003
- Munster Senior Club Hurling Championship (9): 1972, 1974, 1975, 1978, 1987, 1988, 2000, 2001, 2002
- Cork Senior Football Championship (11): 1972, 1974, 1975, 1977, 1978, 1981, 1987, 1988, 2000, 2001, 2002

Cork

- All-Ireland Senior Football Championship (2): 1989, 1990
- Munster Senior Football Championship (8): 1987, 1988, 1989, 1990, 1993, 1994, 1995, 2006
- National Football League (1): 1988-89
- Philips Sports Manager of the Year (1): 1990

Sporting positions
Preceded by Donal Hunt	Cork Senior Football Captain; 1973	Succeeded by Denis Coughlan
Preceded by Frank Cogan	Cork Senior Football Manager; 1979–1980	Succeeded by Éamonn Ryan
Preceded by Denis Coughlan	Cork Senior Football Manager; 1986–1996	Succeeded by Larry Tompkins
Preceded by Larry Tompkins	Cork Senior Football Manager; 2003–2007	Succeeded by Teddy Holland
Achievements
Preceded by Tony Scullion (Ballaghy)	All-Ireland Club SFC winning captain 1973	Succeeded by Paddy Kerr (UCD)
Preceded by Tony McTague (Offaly)	All-Ireland SFC winning captain 1973	Succeeded by Seán Doherty (Dublin)
Preceded by Martin Furlong (Leinster)	Railway Cup Football final winning captain 1975	Succeeded by Mickey 'Ned' O'Sullivan (Munster)
Preceded by Seán Boylan (Meath)	All-Ireland SFC winning manager 1989–1990	Succeeded by Pete McGrath (Down)
Preceded by Brian McIver (Ballinderry Shamrocks)	All-Ireland Club SFC winning manager 2003	Succeeded by Frank Doherty; Gabriel Naughten (Caltra)
Awards
Preceded by Willie Bryan (Offaly)	Texaco Footballer of the Year; 1973	Succeeded by Kevin Heffernan (Dublin)
