= 1978–79 All-Ireland Senior Club Football Championship =

All-Ireland Senior Club Football Championship

- Teams: 33
- Champions: Nemo Rangers (2nd title); Brian Murphy (captain)
- Runners-up: Scotstown; Cormac Morgan (captain)

The 1978–79 All-Ireland Senior Club Football Championship was the ninth staging of the All-Ireland Senior Club Football Championship since its establishment by the Gaelic Athletic Association in 1970-71.

Thomond College were the defending champions, however, they failed to qualify after being between in the Limerick County Championship.

On 17 March 1979, Nemo Rangers won the championship following a 2-09 to 1-03 defeat of Scotstown in the All-Ireland final at Croke Park. It was their second championship title overall and their first title since 1973.

== Munster ==
=== First round ===
29 October 1978 First round	Kilrush Shamrocks	1-11 - 0-07	Fethard	The Cricket Field

12 November 1978 First round	Austin Stacks	1-12 - 0-05	Monaleen	Austin Stack Park
	M Sheehy 0-6, B Carroll 1-0, B O'Sullivan 0-2, JL McEligott 0-2, J O'Keeffe 0-1, J Power 0-1.		N Moloney 0-2, N Bridgeman 0-2, W Cremin 0-1.

=== Semi-finals ===
12 November 1978 Semi-final	Ballinacourty	3-03 - 1-10	Kilrush Shamrocks	Fraher Field
	J O'Dwyer 1-1, J Kiely 1-0, M Hanrahan 1-0, S Fitzgerald 0-2.		S Roche 0-5, S Moloney 1-0, B O'Reilly 0-3, M O'Reilly 0-2.

26 November 1978 Semi-final	Nemo Rangers	1-11 - 2-08	Austin Stacks	Páirc Uí Chaoimh
	T Dalton 1-3, D Allen 0-4, D Gaery 0-1, J Barrett 0-1, S Hayes 0-1, K Collins 0-1.		M Sheehy 2-4, B O'Sullivan 0-2, B Carroll 0-1, P Moriarty 0-1.

17 December 1978 Semi-final replay	Austin Stacks	2-08 - 1-12	Nemo Rangers	Austin Stack Park
	M Sheehy 2-4, P McCarthy 0-2, B O'Sullivan 0-1, JL McEligott 0-1.		D Allen 1-7, K Brady 0-1, N Morgan 0-1, D O'Driscoll 0-1, T Dalton 0-1, J Barrett 0-1.

=== Final ===
4 February 1979 Final	Kilrush Shamrocks	0-05 - 0-08	Nemo Rangers	The Cricket Field
	S Moloney 0-2, A Moloney 0-1, T Fitzpatrick 0-1, J Keogh 0-1.		D Linehan 0-2, J Barrett 0-2, D Allen 0-1, D O'Driscoll 0-1, T Dalton 0-1, J Kerrigan 0-1.

== Quarter-final ==
Quarter-final	Killererin	w/o - scr.	Kingdom

== Semi-finals ==
4 March 1979 Semi-final	Killererin	1-06 - 3-06	Nemo Rangers	Tuam Stadium

4 March 1979 Semi-final	Walsh Island	0-08 - 3-04	Scotstown	O'Connor Park

== Final ==
17 March 1979 Final	Nemo Rangers	2-09 - 1-03	Scotstown	Croke Park

== Statistics ==
=== Miscellaneous ===
- Walsh Island won the Leinster Club SFC for the first time.
- Nemo Rangers became the first team to win four Munster Club SFC titles.
- Scotstown won the Ulster Club SFC for the first time. They were also the first team from Monaghan to win the provincial title.
- Jim McCabe became the first Ulster player to top the scoring charts for a club football season.
