= 1983–84 All-Ireland Senior Club Football Championship =

Irish Football Championship

- Teams: 33
- Champions: Nemo Rangers (4th title); Jimmy Kerrigan (captain)
- Runners-up: Walterstown; Tommy McGovern (captain)

The 1983–84 All-Ireland Senior Club Football Championship was the 14th staging of the All-Ireland Senior Club Football Championship since its establishment by the Gaelic Athletic Association in 1970-71.

Portlaoise were the defending champions, however, they failed to qualify after being beaten in the Laois County Championship.

On 12 February 1984, Nemo Rangers won the championship following a 2–10 to 0–05 defeat of Walterstown in the All-Ireland final at Páirc Chiaráin. This was their fourth championship title overall and their first title since 1982.

== Munster ==
=== First round ===
| 13 November 1983 First round | Croom | 1-04 - 0-09 | Loughmore–Castleiney | Páirc na nGael |
| | M Moloney 1-0, P Kiely 0-3, G Murray 0-1. | | T McGrath 0-4, P McGrath 0-3, J Treacy 0-2. |

| 11 December 1983 First round | Kilrossanty | 0-01 - 2-18 | Nemo Rangers | Páirc Naomh Bríd |
| | M Walsh 0-1. | | E Fitzgerald 1-3, M Dorgan 1-1, S Coughlan 0-4, D Allen 0-3, S Hayes 0-2, C Murphy 0-2, T Dalton 0-2, D Murphy 0-1. |

=== Semi-finals ===
| 27 November 1983 Semi-final | Loughmore–Castleiney | 0-08 - 0-08 | Doonbeg | St. Michael's Park |
| | P McGrath 0-3, M McGrath 0-2, J Treacy 0-1, T Ryan 0-1, T McGrath 0-1. | | G Killeen 0-4, E O'Neill 0-2, T Killeen 0-1, J Killeen 0-1. |

| 11 December 1983 Semi-final replay | Doonbeg | 1-07 - 1-02 (aet) | Loughmore–Castleiney | Cusack Park |
| | G Killeen 0-5, T Tubridy 1-0, J Doyle 0-1, M Killeen 0-1. | | G Stapleton 1-0, T McGrath 0-1, M McGrath 0-1. |

| 18 December 1983 Semi-final | Nemo Rangers | 2-06 - 1-06 | Kenmare | Cloughduv Sportsfield |
| | Charlie Murphy 1-3, E Fitzgerald 1-2, T Nation 0-1. | | E O'Sullivan 1-0, Danny O'Sullivan 0-2, D O'Dwyer 0-1, M Maybury 0-1, Dan O'Sullivan 0-1, M O'Shea 0-1. |

=== Final ===
| 22 January 1984 Final | Nemo Rangers | 2-10 - 0-03 | Doonbeg | Gaelic Grounds |
| | Charlie Murphy 2-1, E Fitzgerald 0-6, Colm Murphy 0-1, D Allen 0-1, T Dalton 0-1. | | G Killeen 0-3. |

== Quarter-final ==
| 29 January 1984 Quarter-final | Burren | 3-12 - 0-02 | Tír Chonaill Gaels | St Mary's Park |

== Semi-finals ==
| 11 February 1984 Semi-final | Walterstown | 3-06 - 0-08 | Burren | Páirc Naomh Bríd |

| 11 February 1984 Semi-final | St Mary's | 1-07 - 2-10 | Nemo Rangers | Páirc Chiaráin |

== Final ==
| 12 February 1984 Final | Nemo Rangers | 2-10 - 0-05 | Walterstown | Páirc Chiaráin |

== Statistics ==
=== Miscellaneous ===
- St Mary's became the first team to win three Connacht Club Championship titles.
