= 1972–73 All-Ireland Senior Club Football Championship =

Irish Football Championship

- Dates: 1 October 1972 – 24 June 1973
- Teams: 33
- Champions: Nemo Rangers (1st title); Billy Morgan (captain)
- Runners-up: St Vincent's; Jimmy Keaveney (captain)

Tournament statistics
- Matches played: 34
- Goals scored: 98 (2.88 per match)
- Points scored: 517 (15.21 per match)
- Top scorer(s): Jimmy Keaveney (2–26)

Provincial Champions
- Munster: Nemo Rangers
- Leinster: St Vincent's
- Ulster: Clan na Gael
- Connacht: Fr Griffin's

The 1972–73 All-Ireland Senior Club Football Championship was the third staging of the All-Ireland Senior Club Football Championship since its establishment by the Gaelic Athletic Association in 1970–71. The competition ran from 1 October 1972 to 24 June 1973.

Bellaghy entered the championship as the defending champions, however, they were beaten by Ardboe O'Donovan Rossa in the Ulster quarter-finals.

The All-Ireland final, the first to go to a replay, was played on 24 June 1973 at Semple Stadium in Thurles, between Nemo Rangers and St Vincent's, in what was their first ever championship meeting. Nemo Rangers won the match by 4–6 to 0–10 to claim a first title.

Jimmy Keaveney was the top scorer, finishing with 2–26.

== Connacht ==
=== First round ===
14 January 1973 First round	Fr Griffin's	1-07 - 2-03	Curry	Pearse Stadium
	G Mahony 0-5, J Flaherty 1-0, D Flynn 0-1, M Newell 0-1.		T Colleary 1-0, A Colleary 1-0, M Durcan 0-1, M Brennan 0-1, O Henry 0-1.

=== Semi-finals ===
21 January 1973 Semi-final	Ballaghaderreen	0-08 - 1-03	Ballinamore Seán O'Heslin's	Fr O'Hara Park
	J Morley 0-6, G Coleman 0-1, S Kilbride 0-1.		D Gannon 1-1, F Duignan 0-1, T Gallagher 0-1.

28 January 1973 Semi-final	Roscommon Gaels	1-06 - 2-06	Fr Griffin's	Dr Hyde Park
	T Donnellan 1-0, M McNamara 0-3, B Penny 0-1, T Keaveney 0-1, T Hunt 0-1.		G Mahony 1-3, M Nolan 0-1, L Salmon 0-1, MJ Keane 0-1.

=== Final ===
11 February 1973 Final	Fr Griffin's	1-08 - 0-06	Ballaghaderreen	Pearse Stadium
	G Mahony 0-5, M Nolan 1-1, D Flynn 0-1, D O'Shea 0-1.		J Morley 0-4, M Dooney 0-1, J Duffy 0-1.

== Leinster ==
=== First round ===
19 November 1972 First round	Clonguish	1-08 - 2-07	The Downs	Pearse Park
	S Allen 1-0, P Burke 0-3, T Hopkins 0-2, T McCormack 0-2, J Flynn 0-1.		T Cleary 1-3, S Conroy 1-0, D Smyth 0-2, M Carley 0-1, L Eggerton 0-1.

19 November 1972 First round	Carbury	3-10 - 2-05	Emo	Weavers Fields
	K Kelly 3-2, K Connolly 0-4, P Mangan 0-1, M McKeever 0-1, T Moore 0-1, M Moore 0-1.		B Lawlor 2-1, T Browne 0-2, C O'Connor 0-1, C O'Connor 0-1.

19 November 1972 First round	St Mary's	3-07 - 2-06	Seneschalstown	St Mary's Park
	B Landy 2-5, T McDonald 1-0, A Courtney 0-1, M McDonald 0-1.		S Carter 1-3, T McDonagh 0-2, O Geraghty 0-1, F Heskin 0-1.

19 November 1973 First round	Baltinglass	1-07 - 1-04	Tinryland	Aughrim County Ground

=== Quarter-finals ===
3 December 1972 Quarter-final	Baltinglass	3-03 - 1-08	Ballyhogue	Pearse Park
	L Norton 1-0, J Cullen 1-0, S Cunningham 1-0, P Burke 0-2, J Wall 0-1.

3 December 1972 Quarter-final	Carbury	3-10 - 0-05	Clann na Gael	St Conleth's Park
	K Connolly 1-5, T Moore 2-1, P Tyrrell 0-2, M McKeever 0-1, J Farrell 0-1.

3 December 1972 Quarter-final	The Downs	1-11 - 1-09	Ferbane	Cusack Park
	T Cleary 0-5, T Carr 0-4, B Smyth 1-0, D Smyth 0-1, J Henry 0-1.		T McTague 0-8, S Lowry 1-0, L Grogan 0-1.

3 December 1972 Quarter-final	St Mary's	0-08 - 0-06	St Vincent's	St Mary's Park
	J Keaveney 0-4, PJ Reid 0-2, B Mullins 0-1, P Doyle 0-1.		T McDonald 0-2, M McDonald 0-2, B Landy 0-1, J Maguire 0-1.

=== Semi-finals ===
18 March 1973 Semi-final	The Downs	3-08 - 2-07	Carbury	O'Connor Park
	J McKay 1-2, D Smyth 1-2, M Carley 1-1, J Henry 0-1, T Carr 0-1, T Cleary 0-1.		K Connolly 1-2, K Kelly 1-0, M Moore 0-2, P Ryrrell 0-2, P Mangan 0-1.

25 March 1973 Semi-final	St Vincent's	2-16 - 0-09	Baltinglass	St Conleth's Park
	J Keaveney 0-8, D Redmond 1-1, G Keavey 1-1, B Doyle 0-4, T Hanahoe 0-2.		P Burke 0-7, W Wall 0-2.

=== Final ===
15 April 1973 Final	St Vincent's	6-10 - 2-05	The Downs	Páirc Tailteann
	D Foley 2-3, J Keaveney 2-2, C Leaney 1-1, D Redmond 0-4, R Doyle 1-0.		L Egerton 2-0, D Smith 0-2, J Henry 0-1, D Murtagh 0-1, M Carley 0-1.

== First round ==
4 March 1973 First round	Kilsheelan	1-05 - 0-11	Doonbeg	Kilsheelan GAA Grounds
	J Kehoe 0-5, L Murphy 1-0.		J Griffin 0-4, F Griffin 0-3, P O'Grady 0-2, M Killeen 0-1, E O'Neill 0-1.

4 March 1973 First round	Stradbally	1-05 - 1-11	Nemo Rangers	Walsh Park
	S Ahern 0-5, R Ahern 1-0.		B Cogan 0-4, S Coughlan 1-0, J Barrett 0-3, C Murphy 0-2, L Good 0-1, K Collins 0-1.

=== Semi-finals ===
25 March 1973 Semi-final	Nemo Rangers	2-09 - 2-07	Kenmare	Cork Athletic Grounds
	S Coughlan 1-2, B Cogan 1-0, C Murphy 0-3, D Philpott 0-2, G Noonan 0-1, L Good 0-1.		P Finnegan 1-5, N Sullivan 1-0, F Sullivan 0-1, J O'Neill 0-1.

1 April 1973 Semi-final	Doonbeg	0-10 - 1-04	Claughaun	Michael Tubridy Memorial Park
	F Griffin 0-5, M Kileen 0-2, P O'Grady 0-1, E O'Neill 0-1, P Cotter 0-1.		G McGrath 1-0, M Tynan 0-2, M Graham 0-1, E Cregan 0-1.

=== Final ===
23 April 1973 Final	Nemo Rangers	3-09 - 0-05	Doonbeg	Fitzgerald Park
	D Cogan 2-1, K Collins 0-5, J Barrett 1-1, L Good 0-1, S Coughlan 0-1.		S Griffin 0-4, J Griffin 0-1.

== Ulster ==
=== First round ===
1 October 1972 First round	Glasgow	2-03 - 4-12	Clan na Gael	Glasgow

1 October 1972 First round	St Eunan's	0-10 - 0-10	Bellaghy	O'Donnell Park
	J Winston 0-6, L Byrne 0-2, S Ferriter 0-1, M Sweeeny 0-1.		T Quinn 0-3, F O'Loane 0-2, K Cassidy 0-2, T Diamond 0-1, S O'Neill 0-1, L Diamond 0-1.

8 October 1972 First round replay	Bellaghy	3-10 - 1-13	St Eunan's	Rossa Park
	F O'Loane 1-3, S O'Neill 1-1, L Diamond 1-1, K Cassidy 0-2, B Cassidy 0-1, T Quinn 0-1, H McGoldrick 0-1.		J Winston 0-10, M Sweeney 1-0, J Gallagher 0-1, S Ferriter 0-1, P McGowan 0-1.

=== Quarter-finals ===
8 October 1972 Quarter-final	Crosserlough	5-09 - 0-04	Tempo Maguires	Breffni Park
	H Sheridan 2-0, P Cahill 1-3, T Rehill 0-3, T Brady 0-1, P Boyle 0-1.		S McCusker 0-1, T McPhillips 0-1, D Campbell 0-1, A Campbell 0-1.

8 October 1972 Quarter-final	Clan na Gael	2-08 - 2-05	St John's	Lurgan Grounds

8 October 1972 Quarter-final	Castleblayney Faughs	2-09 - 0-12	Russell Gaelic Union, Downpatrick	St Mary's Park
	P McEnerney 2-2, T Loughman 0-2, G Fitzpatrick 0-2, B McDonald 0-1, E Tavey 0-1, D Mulligan 0-1.		P Smith 0-4, P Kelly 0-4, T King 0-3, B Moore 0-1.

5 November 1972 Quarter-final	Bellaghy	1-05 - 1-07	Ardboe O'Donovan Rossa	Rossa Park
	B Cassidy 1-0, K Cassidy 0-2, T O'Loane 0-2, H McGoldrick 0-1.		F McGuigan 0-7, P Devlin 1-0.

=== Semi-finals ===
5 November 1972 Semi-final	Clan na Gael	1-05 - 1-05	Castleblayney Faughs	Páirc Esler
	B Murphy 1-0, J Smyth 0-2, S Lavery 0-1, J McKenna 0-1, N O'Hagan 0-1.		E Tavey 1-2, G Fitzpatrick 0-1, McKenna 0-1, M Moore 0-1.

19 November 1972 Semi-final replay	Clan na Gael	5-02 - 0-06	Castleblayney Faughs	Páirc Esler
	C McKinstry 1-0, S Laverty 1-0, T McCaughey 1-0, J McKenna 0-1, S Donaghy 0-1.		G Fitzpatrick 0-3, B McDonald 0-1, D Brereton 0-1, N O'Hagan 0-1.

19 November 1972 Semi-final	Crosserlough	2-08 - 1-07; Declared void	Ardboe O'Donovan Rossa	St Tiernach's Park

=== Final ===
31 December 1972 Final	Clan na Gael	0-08 - 1-03	Ardboe O'Donovan Rossa	St. Mary's Park
	J Smith 0-3, S O'Hagan 0-2, J McKenna 0-2, P McGennis 0-1.		J Greene 1-0 (og), K Teague 0-2, S Coyne 0-1.

== Semi-finals ==
29 April 1973 Semi-final	Fr Griffin's	0-09 - 0-17	Nemo Rangers	Pearse Stadium
	G Mahoney 0-8, D Flynn 0-1.		J Barrett 0-6, K Collins 0-4, S Coughlan 0-2, F Cogan 0-2, B Cogan 0-2, B Murphy 0-1.

28 April 1973 Semi-final	St Vincent's	2-08 - 0-07	Clan na Gael	Croke Park
	C Leaney 1-1, B Mullins 1-0, B Doyle 0-2, J Keaveney 0-2, T Hanahoe 0-1, P Hallinan 0-1, B Pocock 0-1.		M O'Neill 0-6, N O'Hagan 0-1.

== Final ==
4 June 1973 Final	Nemo Rangers	2-11 - 2-11	St Vincent's	O'Moore Park
	J Barrett 1-2, K Collins 0-4, L Good 1-0, C Murphy 0-2, S Coughlan 0-2, F Cogan 0-1.		D Foley 1-2, J Keaveney 0-5, C Leaney 1-0, B Doyle 0-2, T Hanahoe 0-1, D Redmond 0-1.	Referee: Mick Spain (Offaly)

24 June 1973 Final replay	Nemo Rangers	4-06 - 0-10	St Vincent's	Semple Stadium
	J Barrett 1-1, B Cogan 1-0, S Coughlan 1-0, L Good 1-0, K Collins 0-3, C Murphy 0-1, D Barrett 0-1.		J Keaveney 0-5, PJ Reid 0-3, T Hanahoe 0-2.	Referee: Mick Spain (Offaly)

== Statistics ==
=== Top scorers ===
Rank	Player	Club	Tally	Total	Matches	Average
1	Jimmy Keaveney	St Vincent's	2-26	32	6	5.40
1	Gerry Mahony	Fr Griffin's	1-21	24	4	6.00
3	Jimmy Barrett	Nemo Rangers	3-13	22	6	3.66

=== Miscellaneous ===
- St Vincent's won the Leinster Club SFC for the first time. They were also the first team from Dublin to win the provincial title.
- Clan na Gael won the Ulster Club SFC for the first time. They were also the first team from Armagh to win the provincial title.
- The Central Council was spared some embarrassment when the All-Ireland final ended in a draw as there was no trophy available to be presented.
