= 1981–82 All-Ireland Senior Club Football Championship =

Irish Football Championship

- Teams: 33
- Champions: Nemo Rangers (3rd title); Colm Murphy (captain)
- Runners-up: Garrymore

The 1981–82 All-Ireland Senior Club Football Championship was the 12th staging of the All-Ireland Senior Club Football Championship since its establishment by the Gaelic Athletic Association in 1970-71.

St Finbarr's were the defending champions, but failed to qualify after being beaten by Nemo Rangers in the 1981 Cork County Championship.

On 16 May 1982, Nemo Rangers won the championship following a 6-11 to 1-08 defeat of Garrymore in the All-Ireland final at Cusack Park. It was their third championship title overall and their first title since 1979.

== Munster ==
=== First round ===
11 October 1981 First round	Kilrush Shamrocks	1-09 - 2-06	Galtee Rovers	The Cricket Field
	B O'Reilly 0-5, S Moloney 1-1, A Moloney 0-2, M Fennell 0-1.		E McCarthy 2-0, M McCarthy 0-4, J O'Dwyer 0-1, J Hayes 0-1.

24 October 1981 First round	Ballinacourty	1-03 - 4-14	Nemo Rangers	Fraher Field
	M Hanrahan 1-0, T Whelan 0-1, J Mulligan 0-1, S Fitzgerald 0-1.		Charlie Murphy 2-3, D Allen 0-5, M Dorgan 1-1, A Burke 1-0 (og), E Fitzgerald 0-2, S Hayes 0-2, D O'Driscoll 0-1.

8 November 1981 First round replay	Galtee Rovers	0-03 - 1-06	Kilrush Shamrocks	Canon Hayes Park
	S McCarthy 0-2, M McCarthy 0-1.		S Moloney 1-0, C Fennell 0-1, M O'Reilly 0-1, J Roche 0-1, B O'Reilly 0-1, M Brugh 0-1, A Moloney 0-1.

=== Semi-finals ===
22 November 1981 Semi-final	Kilrush Shamrocks	1-08 - 0-07	St Kieran's	The Cricket Field
	M Brugh 1-0, B O'Reilly 0-3, A Moloney 0-3, S Moloney 0-1, A O'Reilly 0-1.		P Leahy 0-5, T Greaney 0-1, P O'Connor 0-1.

5 December 1981 Semi-final	Nemo Rangers	0-11 - 0-02	Castleisland Desmonds	Ballinlough Sportsfield
	Charlie Murphy 0-3, T Hennebrey 0-2, T Dalton 0-2, S Hayes 0-2, M Niblock 0-1, M Dorgan 0-1.		W O'Connor 0-1, P O'Connor 0-1.

=== Final ===
6 March 1982 Final	Nemo Rangers	3-09 - 1-06	Kilrush Shamrocks	Páirc Uí Chaoimh
	D Allen 1-2, S Hayes 1-1, Charlie Murphy 1-0, T Dalton 0-3, J Kerrigan 0-2, S Coughlan 0-1.		S Moloney 1-1, A Moloney 0-4, J Roche 0-1.

== Quarter-final ==
11 April 1982 Quarter-final	Garrymore	0-09 - 0-08	Parnells	Hollymount

== Semi-finals ==
18 April 1982 Semi-final	Nemo Rangers	1-10 - 0-07	Raheens	Páirc Uí Chaoimh

25 April 1982 Semi-final	Ballinderry	1-04 - 0-08	Garrymore	Wolfe Tone Park

== Final ==
16 May 1982 Final	Nemo Rangers	6-11 - 1-08	Garrymore	Cusack Park

== Statistics ==
=== Miscellaneous ===
- Raheens won the Leinster Club Championship for the first time in their history. They were also the first team from Kildare to win the provincial title.
- Garrymore won the Connacht Club Championship title for the first time in their history.
