= 1978 Cork Senior Football Championship =

Gaelic football competition

- Dates: 9 April – 17 September 1978
- Teams: 20
- Champions: Nemo Rangers (5th title); Brian Murphy (captain)
- Runners-up: St Michael's

Tournament statistics
- Matches played: 35
- Goals scored: 99 (2.83 per match)
- Points scored: 545 (15.57 per match)
- Top scorer(s): Dinny Allen (2-36)

The 1978 Cork Senior Football Championship was the 90th staging of the Cork Senior Football Championship since its establishment by the Cork County Board in 1887. The championship began on 9 April 1978 and ended on 17 September 1978. It was the first championship to use a group stage format followed by a knockout phase.

Nemo Rangers entered the championship as the defending champions.

On 17 September 1978, Nemo Rangers won the championship following a 1-09 to 1-03 defeat of St Michael's in the final. This was their fifth championship title overall and their second title in succession. It was the first time that two teams had qualified for the final having earlier lost a match. St. Michael's became the first team since Fermoy in 1944 to lose three finals in-a-row.

Dinny Allen was the championship's top scorer with 2-36.

== Format change ==
Since its inception in 1887 the championship had been played on a straight knock-out basis. If any team was defeated at any stage it meant automatic elimination. This system was deemed the fairest as the county champions would always be the team who won all of their games. There were some problems with this system and a special committee was established to examine the standard of competing teams. At the County Convention on 5 February 1978, delegates voted by 138 to 83 in favour of changing the format of the championship. The new format incorporated a group stage involving four different divisions followed by a knockout stage.

== Team changes ==
=== To Championship ===
Promoted from the Cork Intermediate Football Championship

- Naomh Abán

=== From Championship ===
Declined to field a team

- Imokilly

== Results ==
=== Division 1 ===
==== Table ====
Pos	Team	Pld	W	D	L	SF	SA	Diff	Pts
1	St. Finbarr's	4	4	0	0	7-30	2-33	12	8
2	Nemo Rangers	4	3	0	1	11-45	3-21	48	6
3	St Michael's	4	2	0	2	8-30	6-32	4	4
4	St. Nicholas'	4	1	0	3	3-25	14-30	-38	2
5	UCC	4	0	0	4	6-25	10-39	-26	0
Green background The top-placed team qualified for the semi-final stage of the championship proper. Yellow background The second and third-placed teams qualified for the quarter-final stage of the championship proper.

==== Results ====
14 April 1978	University College Cork	2-05 - 3-10	St Michael's	Ballinlough Stadium, Ballinlough
	H Moynihan 1-1, C Kearney 1-0, S Walsh 0-3, B Kearney 0-1.		T Cashman 1-6, T Lyons 2-2, B Field 0-1, D McCurtain 0-1.

15 April 1978	St. Finbarr's	1-07 - 0-08	Nemo Rangers	Páirc Uí Chaoimh, Cork
	C Ryan 1-1, F Twomey 0-2, D Burns 0-1, R Kenny 0-1, C Myers 0-1, J Barry-Murphy 0-1.		D Allen 0-4, K Brady 0-1, D Murphy 0-1, T Dalton 0-1, D O'Driscoll 0-1.	Referee: J Dennigan

29 April 1978	St. Finbarr's	2-08 - 1-09	University College Cork	Páirc Uí Chaoimh, Cork
	J Barry-Murphy 1-3, J Allen 1-0, C Ryan 0-2, E Fitzpatrick 0-1, C Myers 0-1, F O'Mahony 0-1.		S Walsh 1-1, H Moynihan 0-2, M Kerins 0-2, C Mangan 0-1, J Meyler 0-1, C Kearney 0-1.

30 April 1978	St Michael's	4-08 - 1-08	St. Nicholas'	Páirc Uí Chaoimh, Cork
	E O'Donoghue 2-1, T Cashman 1-1, D McCurtain 1-0, P Kavanagh 0-3, B Field 0-2, P Crowley 0-1.		T O'Brien 1-2, F O'Sullivan 0-1, J Buckley 0-1, G O'Sullivan 0-1, G O'Callaghan 0-1, D O'Donoghue 0-1, R Whitley 0-1.

5 May 1978	St. Nicholas'	1-07 - 2-03	University College Cork	Páirc Uí Chaoimh, Cork
	G O'Callaghan 1-1, F O'Sullivan 0-3, T O'Brien 0-1, J O'Neill 0-1, J Buckley 0-1.		J Meyler 1-0, H Moynihan 1-0, C Kearney 0-2, C Mangan 0-1.

13 May 1978	Nemo Rangers	4-14 - 1-08	University College Cork	Páirc Uí Chaoimh, Cork
	D Allen 1-6, D Linehan 1-2, C Murphy 1-1, T Dalton 1-1, J Barrett 0-2, D Murphy 0-1, J Kerrigan 0-1.		C Kearney 1-1, L Gould 0-3, S Murphy 0-1, J Meyler 0-1, D Nyhan 0-1, F Coffey 0-1.

4 June 1978	Nemo Rangers	6-10 - 0-01	St. Nicholas'	Ballinlough Stadium, Ballinlough
	S Coughlan 1-2, N Morgan 1-2, D Linehan 1-2, J Barrett 1-0, R Whitley 1-0 (og), D Allen 0-2, D Murphy 0-1, T Dalton 0-1.		J O'Sullivan 0-1.

4 June 1978	St. Finbarr's	2-06 - 0-07	St Michael's	Ballinlough Stadium, Ballinlough
	M Lynch 1-1, J O'Callaghan 1-0, E Fitzpatrick 0-3, J McCarthy 0-1, C Ryan 0-1.		B Field 0-3, T Cashman 0-1, E O'Donoghue 0-1, R Cummins 0-1, C O'Leary 0-1.

14 June 1978	St. Finbarr's	2-09 - 1-09	St. Nicholas'	Páirc Uí Chaoimh, Cork
	J Barry-Murphy 2-0,

16 June 1978	Nemo Rangers	1-13 - 1-05	St Michael's	Páirc Uí Chaoimh, Cork
	D Allen 0-10, D Geary 1-0, S Coughlan 0-1, D O'Driscoll 0-1, T Dalton 0-1.		B Field 1-0, D Buckley 0-3, T Cashman 0-1, R Cummins 0-1.

=== Division 2 ===
==== Table ====
Pos	Team	Pld	W	D	L	SF	SA	Diff	Pts
1	Clonakilty	3	2	0	1	6-28	4-23	11	4
2	Millstreet	3	2	0	1	4-31	4-26	5	4
3	Bishopstown	3	2	0	1	3-24	3-26	-2	4
4	Dohenys	3	0	0	3	5-13	9-31	-30	0
Yellow background The first and second-placed teams qualified for the quarter-final stage of the championship proper.

==== Results ====
16 April 1978	Millstreet	0-09 - 1-10	Bishopstown	Castle Grounds, Macroom
	T Kennelly 0-4, B McSweeney 0-2, M Gilsenan 0-1, D Kelleher 0-1, J Kennelly 0-1.		J Crowley 1-3, T O'Reilly 0-3, J Lynch 0-2, E Murphy 0-1, D O'Connor 0-1.

16 April 1978	Clonakilty	2-08 - 1-05	Dohenys	Rossa Park, Skibbereen
	J O'Neill 1-1, J O'Donovan 1-0, P Griffin 0-3, P O'Regan 0-2, F O'Regan 0-1, P Gavin 0-1.		D O'Herlihy 1-1, C O'Rourke 0-4.

29 April 1978	Bishopstown	0-08 - 0-06	Dohenys	Cloughduv
	J Crowley 0-3, T O'Reilly 0-3, J Lynch 0-1, B Murphy 0-1.		J Carroll 0-1, J Collins 0-1, B O'Rourke 0-1, C O'Rourke 0-1, D Collins 0-1, V Sullivan 0-1.

14 May 1978	Millstreet	1-12 - 1-09	Clonakilty	Castle Grounds, Macroom
	T Kenneally 0-7, J Kenneally 1-2, D Kelleher 0-2, B McSweeney 0-1.		D McCarthy 1-0, P Griffin 0-3, P Coogan 0-2, TF Hayes 0-2, J O'Donovan 0-2.

18 June 1978	Millstreet	3-10 - 2-07	Dohenys	Castle Grounds, Macroom
	J Kenneally 1-1, D O'Connor 1-1, D O'Shea 1-0, M McSweeney 0-3, T Kenneally 0-3, D O'Hare 0-2.		D Collins 1-2, V O'Sullivan 1-2, D Herlihy 0-2, C O'Rourke 0-1.

18 June 1978	Clonakilty	3-11 - 2-06	Bishopstown	Kinsale
	J O'Donovan 3-1, P Griffin 0-4, D McCarthy 0-2, P O'Neill 0-1, J O'Neill 0-1, P Coogan 0-1, F O'Regan 0-1.		T O'Reilly 1-1, E O'Connoor 1-0, M Fleming 0-1, J Crowley 0-1, J Walsh 0-1, J Lynch 0-1, D O'Connor 0-1.

==== Playoff ====
8 July 1978	Millstreet	2-09 - 0-05	Bishopstown	Coachford
	T Kenneally 1-4, D O'Shea 1-0, D O'Driscoll 0-1, D O'Connor 0-1, D Kelleher 0-1, T Burke 0-1, J Kenneally 0-1.		T O'Reilly 0-2, D Coakley 0-1, E Murphy 0-1, J Crowley 0-1.

=== Division 3 ===
==== Table ====
Pos	Team	Pld	W	D	L	SF	SA	Diff	Pts
1	Naomh Abán	3	3	0	0	4-29	2-17	18	6
2	Glanworth	3	2	0	1	6-25	4-26	5	4
3	Bantry Blues	3	1	0	2	5-27	5-20	7	2
4	Na Piarsaigh	3	0	0	3	5-13	9-31	-30	0
Yellow background The first-placed team qualified for the quarter-final stage of the championship proper.

==== Results ====
16 April 1978	Bantry Blues	1-11 - 3-08	Glanworth	Innishannon
	D Barron 1-3, F Carroll 0-3, D Hunt 0-2, V McCarthy 0-2, P McCarthy 0-1.		J O'Brien 2-1, A Fahy 1-1, J Courtney 0-3, D Courtney 0-2, K Ahern 0-1.

16 April 1978	Na Piarsaigh	1-06 - 3-09	Naomh Abán	Coachford
	R McDonnell 1-1, J Sullivan 0-3, R Murphy 0-1, M Feehan 0-1.		P Lynch 2-0, D McCarthy 1-2, D Healy 0-4, S Kelleher 0-2, J Hoare 0-1.

14 May 1978	Bantry Blues	3-11 - 2-01	Na Piarsaigh	Castle Grounds, Macroom
	D Hunt 2-1, R Dix 1-3, D Barron 0-6, J Riordan 0-1.		R Murphy 1-0, R McDonnell 1-0, J O'Sullivan 0-1.

14 May 1978	Naomh Abán	1-09 - 0-06	Glanworth	Blarney
	D McCarthy 1-1, D Healy 0-3, J Lynch 0-2, P Lynch 0-2, L Forde 0-1.		J Courtney 0-2, DJ Courtney 0-2, A Fahy 0-1, L O'Brien 0-1.

18 June 1978	Glanworth	3-11 - 2-06	Na Piarsaigh	Watergrasshill
	DJ Ryan 1-4, K Aherne 1-1, D Courtney 1-1, J O'Brien 0-2, P O'Brien 0-2, J Cummins 0-1.		D Hickey 1-1, P McLafferty 1-0, J O'Sullivan 0-3, M Feehan 0-2.

18 June 1978	Naomh Abán	0-11 - 1-05	Bantry Blues	Ballingeary

=== Division 4 ===
9 April 1978 Round 1	Muskerry	1-05 - 2-05	Seandún	Charlie Hurley Park, Bandon
	C Kelly 1-0, G Fitzgerald 0-2, D Shorten 0-2, P Lucey 0-1.		E Murphy 2-1, B Murphy 0-1, P Mackey 0-1, J Barry 0-1, E Forde 0-1.

9 April 1978 Round 1	Carbery	3-12 - 0-05	Carrigdhoun	Charlie Hurley Park, Bandon
	T Holland 2-1, T Murphy 0-5, M Burns 1-1, F Collins 0-3, L Holland 0-1, P Ryan 0-1.		E Hanley 0-2, J Dineen 0-1, G Slyne 0-1, P Kelly 0-1.

9 April 1978 Round 1	Duhallow	0-09 - 3-07	Beara	Ballingeary
	T Horgan 0-8, J Collins 0-1.		J McCarthy 2-0, O O'Sullivan 1-0, B O'Neill 0-3, S O'Sullivan 0-2, S O'Shea 0-1, KJ O'Sullivan 0-1.

30 April 1978 Round 2	Avondhu	0-08 - 1-11	Carbery	Páirc Uí Chaoimh, Cork
	G Mulcahy 0-4, B O'Neill 0-2, T Monaghan 0-2.		M Byrne 1-0, C Swanton 0-3, T Holland 0-2, T Murphy 0-2, P Ryan 0-2, F Collins 0-1, L Holland 0-1.

21 May 1978 Round 2	Beara	3-08 - 1-08	Seandún	Clonakilty

18 June 1978 Round 3	Carbery	1-11 - 1-06	Beara	Rossa Park, Skibbereen
	J Fitzgerald 1-1, T Murphy 0-3, T Holland 0-2, M Burns 0-1, F Collins 0-1, C Collins 0-1, B Evans 0-1, P Ryan 0-1.		S O'Sullivan 1-0, M Reynolds 0-3, O O'Sullivan 0-2, M O'Sullivan 0-1.

=== Quarter-finals ===
22 July 1978 Quarter-final	Nemo Rangers	0-15 - 1-06	Naomh Abán	Castle Grounds, Macroom
	D Allen 0-5, N Morgan 0-4, R Dalton 0-2, C Murphy 0-2, D O'Driscoll 0-1, D Linehan 0-1.		D Healy 1-2, D McCarthy 0-2, G Healy 0-2.

23 July 1978 Quarter-final	St Michael's	3-08 - 0-10	Millstreet	Coachford
	P Kavanagh 3-1, D Buckley 0-3, T Cashman 0-2, A Creagh 0-1, E O'Donoghue 0-1.		T Kenneally 0-5, D O'Driscoll 0-1, D O'Hare 0-1, B McSweeney 0-1, V Coakley 0-1, D O'Connor 0-1.

23 July 1978 Quarter-final	Clonakilty	1-07 - 1-04	Carbery	Clonakilty
	P O'Regan 1-0, P Griffin 0-3, P Googan 0-3, J O'Donovan 0-1.		R Wilmot 1-1, T Holland 0-2, F Collins 0-1.

=== Semi-finals ===
6 August 1978 Semi-final	St Michael's	1-06 - 0-06	St. Finbarr's	Páirc Uí Chaoimh, Cork
	R Cummins 1-0, P Kavanagh 0-2, D Buckley 0-2, T Cashman 0-1, E O'Donoghue 0-1.		J McCarthy 0-4, C Myers 0-1, J Barry-Murphy 0-1.

20 August 1978 Semi-final	Nemo Rangers	0-10 - 0-04	Clonakilty	Charlie Hurley Park, Bandon
	D Allen 0-6, N Morgan 0-2, C Murphy 0-1, J Barrett 0-1.		P Griffin 0-1, TF Hayes 0-1, P McCarthy 0-1, P O'Neill 0-1.

=== Final ===
17 September 1978 Final	Nemo Rangers	1-09 - 1-03	St Michael's	Páirc Uí Chaoimh, Cork
	D Allen 1-3, T Dalton 0-3, N Morgan 0-1, D O'Driscoll 0-1, D Geary 0-1.		D Buckley 1-1, R Cummins 0-1, P Kavanagh 0-1.	Attendance: 5,569; Referee: E Porter (Brian Dillons)

== Championship statistics ==
=== Top scorers ===
Overall

Rank	Player	Club	Tally	Total	Matches	Average
1	Dinny Allen	Nemo Rangers	2-36	42	7	6.00
2	Tim Kenneally	Millstreet	1-23	26	5	5.20
3	Tom Cashman	St. Michael's	2-12	18	7	2.57

=== Miscellaneous ===
- Nemo Rangers officials refused to allow team captain Brian Murphy to receive the cup in protest against the County Board's earlier decision to expel the Nemo Rangers senior hurling team from the 1978 Cork SHC and fine the club £75.
- St. Michael's become the first team since Fermoy between 1942-44 to lose three finals in a row.
