= Nemo Rangers GAA =

Gaelic games club

Nemo Rangers
- Raonaithe Nemo
- Founded: 1922
- County: Cork
- Nickname: Nemo
- Colours
- Grounds: Trabeg GAA Grounds
- Coordinates: 51°52′32.04″N 8°27′04.14″W

Playing kits
Standard colours

Senior Club Championships
	All Ireland	Munster champions	Cork champions
Football:	7	17	24

Nemo Rangers Hurling and Football Club is a Gaelic Athletic Association club in Ballinlough, Cork, Ireland. The club is affiliated to the Seandún Board and the Cork County Board and fields teams in Gaelic football, hurling and camogie.

== Foundation ==
Gaelic games had been played in the area Ballinlough, Turners Cross and South Parish areas since the early years of the Gaelic Athletic Association. Rangers GAA Club was established in 1893 and had been active in Gaelic football circles. Several years later, a group of students from the North Monastery were interested in playing hurling, however, the school principal discouraged Gaelic games in favour of rugby. A lay teacher at the school, Séamus Ó hAodha, supported the students' efforts and proposed the name "Nemo" as a way to preserve the initials "NM" associated with the school. Latin was also part of the school curriculum and "nemo" is the Latin word for "nobody". The Nemo club was established in 1915. But Rangers and Nemo existed as separate clubs until 1922 when, due to falling numbers caused by emigration and the imprisonment of players during the War of Independence, the two clubs amalgamated as Nemo Rangers.

== History ==
From its foundation, the Nemo Rangers Hurling and Football Club was competitive in both codes. The first notable successes occurred in 1928 when Nemo Rangers completed a unique double by winning the Cork IHC and Cork IFC titles. No other club, before or since, has claimed the interemdiate double. After securing senior status in both codes, the decades that followed brought little in terms of success, apart from a Cork JFC title in 1957 and a second Cork IHC title in 1971.

Nemo Rangers celebrated its golden jubilee in 1972 by winning the Cork SFC title for the first time, following a 2–09 to 0–08 win over University College Cork in the final. This title win ushered in an unprecedented period of dominance, with the club, backboned by such players as Billy Morgan, Frank Cogan and Jimmy Barrett, later claiming the Munster Club SFC title. Nemo Rangers ended the campaign with the All-Ireland Club SFC title, after beating St Vincent's by 4–06 to 0–10 in the 1973 All-Ireland Club SFC final replay. The decade ended with Nemo Rangers winning their second All-Ireland Club SFC title, having also claimed five Cork SFC title and four Munster Club SFC titles.

The dominance of the local Gaelic football competitions continued into the following decade and beyond, with new players Dinny Allen, Tony Nation, Jimmy Kerrigan and Shea Fahy coming on the scene. Nemo Rangers won a further five Cork SFC titles between 1981 and 1993. Each one of these titles was subsequently converted a Munster Club SHC success. Nemo Rangers also became the first team to win a third All-Ireland Club SFC title, after beating Garrymore by 6–11 to 1–08 in the 1982 All-Ireland Club SFC final. Further All-Ireland Club SFC titles were claimed after defeats of Clann na nGael (1987 and 1989) and Castlebar Mitchels (1994).

Nemo Rangers began the 21st century by winning three consecutive Cork SFC titles, with their 2002 win over Bishopstown securing a record 13th title and putting Nemo in first place on the all-time roll of honour. Once again, these titles were all followed by Munster Club SFC titles. After consecutive defeats in finals, Nemo Rangers, captained by Colin Corkery, won a record-setting seventh All-Ireland Club SFC title in 2003, following a 0–14 to 1–09 win over Crossmolina Deel Rovers.

Nemo set a new local record by winning four consecutive Cork SFC titles between 2005 and 2008. The club made it five titles in six years in 2010, after beating St Finbarr's by 2–10 to 1–08 in the final. Nemo Rangers won their 21st Cork SFC title in 2019, a win which was subsequently converted into their 17th and last Munster Club SFC title. The club won it's 23rd Cork PSFC title in 2022, following a 1–16 to 2–09 defeat of St Finbarr's in the final.

== Honours ==
=== Football ===
- All-Ireland Senior Club Football Championship (7): 1973, 1979, 1982, 1984, 1989, 1994, 2003
- Munster Senior Club Football Championship (17): 1972, 1974, 1975, 1978, 1981, 1983, 1987, 1988, 1993, 2000, 2001, 2002, 2005, 2007, 2010, 2017, 2019
- Cork Premier Senior Football Championship (24): 1972, 1974, 1975, 1977, 1978, 1981, 1983, 1987, 1988, 1993, 2000, 2001, 2002, 2005, 2006, 2007, 2008, 2010, 2015, 2017, 2019, 2020, 2022, 2026
- Cork Intermediate Football Championship (5): 1928, 1980, 2001, 2002, 2004
- Cork Junior Football Championship (1): 1957
- Cork City Junior A Football Championship (10): 1957, 1967, 1979, 1990, 1995, 1996, 1999, 2002, 2007, 2025
- Cork Under-21 Football Championship (14): 1974, 1975, 1979, 1980, 1988, 1989, 1991, 2001, 2002, 2004, 2005, 2012, 2014, 2018
- Cork City City Under-21 Football Championship (14): 1974, 1975, 1979, 1980, 1988, 1989, 1991, 2001, 2002, 2004, 2005, 2011, 2012, 2013, 2014
- Cork Minor Football Championships (11): 1954, 1955, 1957, 1970, 1972, 1989, 1990, 1991, 1999, 2005, 2016

=== Hurling ===
- Cork Intermediate Hurling Championship (2): 1928, 1971
- Cork Junior A Hurling Championship (2): 2000, 2023
- Cork City Junior A Hurling Championship (15): 1960, 1961, 1962, 1963, 1964, 1991, 1994, 1998, 2000, 2007, 2009, 2017, 2018, 2022, 2023
- Cork Minor Hurling Championships (2): 1955, 1970

== Notable players ==
- Dinny Allen: All-Ireland SFC-winning captain (1989)
- Jimmy Kerrigan: All-Ireland SFC-winner (1989, 1990)
- Paul Kerrigan: All-Ireland SFC-winner (2010)
- Billy Morgan: All-Ireland SFC-winning captain (1973)
- Steven O'Brien: All-Ireland SFC-winner (1989, 1990)
