= 1973 All-Ireland Senior Football Championship final =

Football match

- Event: 1973 All-Ireland Senior Football Championship
Cork	Galway
3–17 (26)	2–13 (19)
- Date: 23 September 1973
- Venue: Croke Park, Dublin
- Referee: John Moloney
- Attendance: 73,308

The 1973 All-Ireland Senior Football Championship final was a Gaelic football match played at Croke Park on 23 September 1973 to determine the winners of the 1973 All-Ireland Senior Football Championship, the 87th season of the All-Ireland Senior Football Championship, a tournament organised by the Gaelic Athletic Association for the champions of the four provinces of Ireland. The final was contested by Galway of Connacht and Cork of Munster, with Cork winning by 3–17 to 2–13.

Cork's All-Ireland victory was their first since 1945. The win gave them their fourth All-Ireland title over all and put them joint sixth on the all-time roll of honour along with Kildare and Tipperary. The game, which remains the highest scoring All-Ireland Senior Football Championship final in history, also marked the emergence of a nineteen-year-old Jimmy Barry-Murphy onto the national stage. Barry-Murphy finished the game with 2–1 (seven points).

Galway's All-Ireland defeat was their second as part of a hat-trick of All-Ireland defeats between 1971 and 1974.

Writers such as John D. Hickey and Martin Breheny have praised the manner in which the game was played.

== Match ==
This year's final was played on 23 September.

=== Summary ===
The game was expected to be an open affair and so it proved, with Cork taking the initiative early on. Dinny Long's centre was punched against the crossbar by Jimmy Barrett; however, 19-year-old Jimmy Barry-Murphy was alert to the rebound and pounced for a well-taken goal after just two minutes. With their confidence boosted, the Cork forwards settled quickly and scores came freely. At the other end of the field, Cork's John Coleman curbed the threat of Galway captain and centre-forward Liam Sammon. Cork led at the interval by 1–10 to 0–6.

The second half produced the unusually high tally of 4–14 with each side landing 2–7. Cork were slow to find the target after the interval; however, once Dinny Long scored a difficult free from under the Hogan Stand and Ray Cummins followed suit from the other side they appeared to be coasting to victory. A Galway revival saw them cut the margin to just three points when Tom Naughton scored a goal, but Cork's response was controlled and efficient. Ray Cummins steadied Cork with three points in quick succession before setting up Jimmy Barry-Murphy for the clinching goal. Johnny Hughes pulled one back for the men from the West; however, it was as close as they got and the Leesiders closed out the contest with their third goal, scored by Jimmy Barrett.

The 1973 All-Ireland decider holds the record as the final which produced the highest cumulative score with 5–30 (i.e. 45 points). At the time, Cork's tally of 3–17 was the highest in a final; however, Dublin bettered this by one point four years later when they recorded 5–12 against Armagh. Galway's tally of 2–13 remains the highest by a losing finalist.

Due to the similarity of the colour of their jerseys a change was necessary. This was done in a bid to aid television viewers who may have been watching in black and white. A coin toss decided that Cork would wear a reversal of their usual jerseys. To help prepare for the All-Ireland final, Cork trained in the jerseys of Tyrone, whom they had beaten in the All-Ireland semi-final.

=== Details ===
23 September 1973
15:15 IST

Galway	2-13 - 3-17	Cork
M Hughes 0-7, T Naughton 1-0, J Hughes 1-0, M Burke 0-2, J Duggan 0-2, TJ Gilmore 0-1, L Sammon 0-1.		R Cummins 0-8, J Barry-Murphy 2-1, J Barrett 1-2, D Long 0-3, E Kirby 0-1, D Coughlan 0-1, D Barron 0-1.

Croke Park, Dublin
Attendance: 73,308
Referee: John Moloney (Tipperary)

Galway	Cork

GK	1	Gay Mitchell
RCB	2	Joe Waldron
FB	3	Jack Cosgrove
LCB	4	Brendan Colleran
RWB	5	Liam O'Neill
CB	6	Tommy Joe Gilmore
LWB	7	Johnny Hughes
M	8	Willie Joyce
M	9	Jimmy Duggan
RWF	10	Maurice Burke
CF	11	Liam Sammon (c)
LWF	12	Michael Rooney
RCF	13	Johnny Coughlan
FF	14	Tom Naughton
LCF	15	Morgan Hughes
Substitutes:
RCF		Frank Canavan
RWF		Colie McDonagh
Coach:
John "Tull" Dunne

GK	1	Billy Morgan (c)
RCB	2	Frank Cogan
FB	3	Humphrey Kelleher (substituted off) ?'
LCB	4	Brian Murphy
RWB	5	Kevin Jer O'Sullivan
CB	6	John Coleman (substituted off) ?'
LWB	7	Con Hartnett
M	8	Dinny Long
M	9	Denis Coughlan
RWF	10	Ned Kirby
CF	11	Declan Barron
LWF	12	Dave McCarthy (substituted off) ?'
RCF	13	Jimmy Barry-Murphy
FF	14	Ray Cummins
LCF	15	Jimmy Barrett
Substitutes:
FB	16	Mick Scannell (substituted on) ?'
	17	Robert Wilmot
LWF	18	Donal Hunt (substituted on) ?'
CB	19	Séamus Coughlan (substituted on) ?'
	20	Teddy O'Brien
	21	Noel Murphy
Coach:
Donie O'Donovan

MATCH RULES

- 80 minutes.
- Replay if scores level.
- Three substitutes allowed.

== Post-match ==
It would be another quarter of a century before Galway won another All-Ireland, doing so in 1998. Before that they would appear in the finals of 1974 and 1983. Cork had to wait sixteen years to win another All-Ireland title, doing so in 1989.

John D. Hickey, writing afterwards in the Irish Independent, described it as "one of the most honest and most wholesome games I have seen". In 2018, Martin Breheny listed this as the sixth greatest All-Ireland Senior Football Championship final, describing it as a game "played in a wonderful spirit, with open, attacking football the priority for both teams" and noting that it marked the emergence of a nineteen-year-old Jimmy Barry-Murphy onto the national stage; this was Barry-Murphy's only All-Ireland football title - the rest were in hurling.
