= John Coleman (Gaelic footballer) =

Irish retired Gaelic footballer

Personal information
- Native name: Seán Ó Colmáin (Irish)
- Born: 1951 (age 74–75) Millstreet, County Cork, Ireland
- Occupation: Car salesman
- Height: 5 ft 10 in (178 cm)

Sport
- Sport: Gaelic football
- Position: Centre-back
Club
- Years: Club
- 1968-1992: Millstreet
Club titles
- Cork titles: 0
Inter-county*
Years	County	Apps (scores)
1970-1979	Cork	20 (0-00)
Inter-county titles
- Munster titles: 3
- All-Irelands: 1
- NFL: 0
- All Stars: 0
- *Inter County team apps and scores correct as of 20:28, 18 December 2016.

John Coleman (born 1951) is an Irish retired Gaelic footballer. His league and championship career with the Cork senior team spanned nine seasons from 1970 to 1979.

Born in Millstreet, County Cork, Coleman first played competitive Gaelic football during his tenure at Millstreet National School. He later attended Rockwell College, however, here he favoured rugby union, winning a Munster medal in 1967. Coleman first appeared for the Millstreet club at underage levels, winning a host of divisional minor championship medals. He also claimed a county under-21 championship medal in 1972.

Coleman made his debut on the inter-county scene when he was selected on the Cork minor team in 1968. He enjoyed two championship seasons with the minors and collected back-to-back All-Ireland medals. Coleman subsequently joined the Cork under-21 team, winning back-to-back All-Ireland medals in 1970 and 1971. By this stage he had also joined the Cork senior team, making his debut during the 1970-71 league. Over the course of the next nine seasons, Coleman won one All-Ireland in 1973.. He also won three Munster medals. Coleman played his last game for Cork in July 1979.

Following the abolition of the ban in 1972, Coleman combined his Gaelic football career with one in rugby union. He represented Munster on a number of occasions, while he also played with the Ireland B team. His older brother Billy Coleman was a former rally driver.

== Playing career ==
=== Minor and under-21 ===
Coleman was just sixteen-years-old when he was selected for the Cork minor team in 1968. He scored 2-2 from centre-forward when he made his debut against Waterford on 5 July 1968. Coleman later won his first Munster medal following a 2-13 to 0-2 trouncing of Kerry in the provincial decider. Cork subsequently qualified for the All-Ireland final against Sligo on 22 September 1968. Coleman missed two guilt-edged goal opportunities, however, Cork built up an impressive eleven-point lead. Sligo launched a stunning comeback in the final twenty minutes and were unlucky not to claim a draw. The 3-5 to 1-10 victory gave Coleman his first All-Ireland medal.

Once again eligible for the minor grade in 1969, Coleman was moved to midfield for the championship campaign. He won a second successive Munster medal that year as Kerry were bested by 3-11 to 0-12. On 28 September 1969 Cork faced Derry in the All-Ireland final. Trailing by 0-8 to 0-3 shortly after the interval, Cork staged a comeback courtesy of two goals by Declan Barron. The 2-7 to 0-11 scoreline secured a third successive championship for Cork and a second winners' medal for Coleman.

Coleman was also a member of the Cork under-21 football panel in 1969. He was an unused substitute that year, however, he collected a Munster medal from the bench as Cork defeated Kerry by 1-14 to 1-11.

In 1970 Coleman joined the Cork under-21 starting team and was positioned at left wing-forward. He won a second Munster medal that year as Cork outclassed Clare by 5-12 to 1-7 in the Munster final. On 4 October 1970 Cork faced Fermamagh in the All-Ireland final. Cork built up a strong 1-7 to 0-3 half-time lead and eventually secured a 2-11 to 0-9 victory. Coleman collected his first All-Ireland medal in the grade, in what was Cork's inaugural under-21 championship title.

Cork dominated in the under-21 grade once again in 1971, with Coleman moving to the centre-back position. He won a third successive Munster medal that year as Cork defeated Waterford by 1-10 to 2-5 in the provincial decider. On 19 September 1971 Cork renewed their rivalry with Fermanagh in the All-Ireland final. Declan Barron and Billy Cogan scored the goals which powered Cork to a 3-10 to 0-3 victory. It was Coleman's second All-Ireland medal in the grade.

=== Senior ===
Coleman made his senior championship debut for Cork on 13 June 1971 in a 2-10 to 0-5 Munster semi-final victory over Clare. In the subsequent provincial final, Cork completely outplayed Kerry in securing a 0-25 to 0-14 victory. It was Coleman's first Munster medal.

Two years later Coleman won a second Munster medal. The 5–12 to 1–15 victory over arch-rivals Kerry showed the traditional football powers that Cork were coming. The subsequent All-Ireland final on 23 September 1973 pitted Cork against Galway. The game was expected to be an open affair and so it proved, with Cork taking the initiative early on. Dinny Long's centre was punched against the crossbar by Jimmy Barrett; however, Jimmy Barry-Murphy was alert to the rebound and pounced for a well-taken goal after just two minutes. With their confidence boosted, the Cork forwards settled quickly and scores came freely. At the other end of the field, Coleman, in spite if suffering from concussion, curbed the threat of Galway captain and centre-forward Liam Sammon. Cork held an interval lead of 1-10 to 0-6. A Galway revival saw them cut the margin to just three points when Tom Naughton scored a goal, but Cork's response was controlled and efficient. Ray Cummins steadied Cork with three points in quick succession before setting up Jimmy Barry-Murphy for the clinching goal. Johnny Hughes pulled one back for the men from the West; however, it was as close as they got and the Leesiders closed out the contest with their third goal, scored by Jimmy Barrett. The 3-17 to 2-13 victory gave Coleman an All-Ireland medal.

In 1974 Cork dominated the provincial championship once again. A 1–11 to 0–7 victory over Kerry gave the county a second consecutive Munster title. It was Coleman's third provincial winners' medal in all. A certain amount of over-confidence crept into the side as Cork were subsequently defeated by eventual champions Dublin in the All-Ireland semi-final.

== Career statistics ==
Team	Season	Munster		All-Ireland		Total	
Team	Season	Apps	Score	Apps	Score	Apps	Score
Cork	1971	2	0-00	1	0-00	3	0-00
Cork	1972	2	0-00	0	0-00	2	0-00
Cork	1973	1	0-00	2	0-00	3	0-00
Cork	1974	0	0-00	1	0-00	1	0-00
Cork	1975	2	0-00	0	0-00	2	0-00
Cork	1976	3	0-00	0	0-00	3	0-00
Cork	1977	2	0-00	0	0-00	2	0-00
Cork	1978	2	0-00	0	0-00	2	0-00
Cork	1979	2	0-00	0	0-00	2	0-00
Total		16	0-00	4	0-00	20	0-00

== Honours ==
Cork

- All-Ireland Senior Football Championship (1): 1973
- Munster Senior Football Championship (3): 1971, 1973, 1974
- All-Ireland Under-21 Football Championship (2): 1970, 1971
- Munster Under-21 Football Championship (3): 1969, 1970, 1971
- All-Ireland Minor Football Championship (2): 1968, 1969
- Munster Minor Football Championship (2): 1968, 1969
