= 1974 Cork Senior Football Championship =

Gaelic football competition

- Dates: 7 April 1974 – 6 October 1974
- Teams: 19
- Champions: Nemo Rangers (2nd title); Billy Morgan (captain)
- Runners-up: Carbery; Christy Collins (captain)

Tournament statistics
- Matches played: 20
- Goals scored: 62 (3.1 per match)
- Points scored: 298 (14.9 per match)
- Top scorer(s): Tony Murphy (0-22)

The 1974 Cork Senior Football Championship was the 86th staging of the Cork Senior Football Championship since its establishment by the Cork County Board in 1887. The draw for the opening round fixtures took place on 27 January 1974. The championship began on 7 April 1974 and ended on 6 October 1974.

University College Cork entered the championship as the defending champions, however, they were beaten by St. Nicholas' in the first round.

On 6 October 1974, Nemo Rangers won the championship following a 2-08 to 1-08 defeat of Carbery in the final. This was their second championship title overall and their first title since 1972.

Carbery's Tony Murphy was the championship's top scorer with 0-22.

== Team changes ==
=== To Championship ===
Promoted from the Cork Intermediate Football Championship

- Canovee

=== From Championship ===
Regraded to the Cork Intermediate Football Championship

- Newcestown

== Results ==
=== First round ===
7 April 1974 First round	Seandún	2-13 - 0-08	Avondhu	Castlelyons
	D Curran 2-1, V Twomey 0-4, M Regan 0-4, R Murphy 0-1, J Rall 0-1, P O'Sullivan 0-1, J Goode 0-1.		T Monaghan 0-2, DJ Ryan 0-2, K McGann 0-1, E Fleming 0-1, E O'Sullivan 0-1, T Molan 0-1.

14 April 1974 First round	Imokilly	1-10 - 2-09	Clonakilty	Ballinhassig
	E Ryan 0-5, M McGee 0-5, H Kennedy 1-0.		P Griffin 1-3, M O'Neill 0-2, G Murphy 0-2, M Leahy 0-1, K Dillon 0-1.

14 April 1974 First round	University College Cork	0-05 - 1-07	St. Nicholas'	Cork Athletic Grounds, Cork
	S Murphy 0-4, B Cronin 0-1.		D Coughlan 0-5, JJ O'Neill 1-0, M O'Halloran 0-1, P Doherty 0-1.

=== Second round ===
7 April 1974 Second round	Carbery	1-10 - 1-07	Beara	Beara Park, Castletownbere
	T Murphy 0-7, D Hunt 1-1, T Crowley 0-1, K Kehilly 0-1.		M Hanley 1-1, T O'Neill 0-4, T Harrington 0-2.

14 April 1974 Second round	Muskerry	0-08 - 1-09	Dohenys	Charlie Hurley Park, Bandon
	J Lynch 0-4, C Twomey 0-1, N Collins 0-1, S Mullane 0-1, V Coakley 0-1.		D Collins 0-5, V O'Sullivan 1-1, C O'Rourke 0-2, S Crowley 0-1.

14 April 1974 Second round	Carrigdhoun	0-05 - 3-11	St. Finbarr's	Shanbally
	P Tuohy 0-2, J Murphy 0-1, G Hanley 0-1, J Buckley 0-1.		J McCarthy 1-7, J Barry-Murphy 1-1, J Hayes 1-0, C Roche 0-2, D Murphy 0-1.

14 April 1974 Second round	Duhallow	3-04 - 2-05	Canovee	Millstreet
	DJ O'Keeffe 1-2, D Buckley 1-1, G O'Sullivan 1-0, N English 0-1.		T O'Leary 1-0, M Walsh 1-0, M Mehigan 0-3, L Nash 0-2.

21 April 1974 Second round	Seandún	3-05 - 2-09	St Michael's	Cork Athletic Grounds, Cork
	R Murphy 1-2, G Good 1-2, D Curran 1-1.		R Cummins 0-6, P Kavanagh 1-0, F O'Connell 1-0, B Field 0-2, D Hartnett 0-1.

28 April 1974 Second round	Nemo Rangers	5-10 - 0-02	Na Piarsaigh	Cork Athletic Grounds, Cork
	C Murphy 3-1, L Good 1-2, K Collins 0-5, D Murphy 1-1, J Barrett 0-1.		J Gardiner 0-1, R Whitley 0-1.

28 April 1974 Second round	Millstreet	2-07 - 1-08	Macroom	Castle Grounds, Macroom
	T Kelleher 0-4, A Kiely 1-0, D O'Shea 1-0, J Kenneally 0-2, D O'Hare 0-1.		L Goold 0-5, J Allen 1-1, T O'Sullivan 0-2.

28 April 1974 Second round	Clonakilty	1-02 - 1-10	St. Nicholas'	Charlie Hurley Park, Bandon
	P Griffin 1-0, B Keohane 0-2.		T O'Brien 1-2, L McAuliffe 0-4, D Coughlan 0-2, JJ O'Neill 0-1, P Harte 0-1.

=== Quarter-finals ===
12 May 1974 Quarter-final	Carbery	2-10 - 1-03	Duhallow	Castle Grounds, Macroom
	T Murphy 0-5, M Burns 1-1, J O'Riordan 1-1, D Hunt 0-2, T Crowley 0-1.		G O'Sullivan 1-0, D Buckley 0-3.

12 May 1974 Quarter-final	Dohenys	3-05 - 3-05	Millstreet	Castle Grounds, Macroom
	V O'Sullivan 1-2, D Collins 1-1, J Carroll 1-1, S O'Sullivan 0-1.		J Kenneally 1-1, D Long 1-0, D O'Shea 1-0, T Kenneally 0-2, A Kiely 0-1.

16 June 1974 Quarter-final replay	Dohenys	1-08 - 1-06	Millstreet	Castle Grounds, Macroom
	D Collins 0-6, D Crowley 1-0, J Carroll 0-1, V O'Sullivan 0-1.		T Kelleher 1-0, D Long 0-2, J Kenneally 0-1, T Kenneally 0-1, D O'Shea 0-1, D O'Hare 0-1.

23 June 1974 Quarter-final	Nemo Rangers	1-10 - 0-11	St. Finbarr's	Cork Athletic Grounds, Cork
	J Barrett 1-3, K Murphy 0-3, S Buckley 0-2, C Murphy 0-1, L Good 0-1.		G McCarthy 0-3, J Hayes 0-2, E Fitzpatrick 0-2, J Barry-Murphy 0-1, B Wiley 0-1, D Murray 0-1, C Myers 0-1.

21 July 1974 Quarter-final	St. Nicholas'	2-11 - 3-08	St Michael's	Cork Athletic Grounds, Cork
	P Harte 1-1, T O'Brien 0-4, D Morley 1-0, JJ O'Neill 0-2, M O'Halloran 0-1, D Coughlan 0-1, P Doherty 0-1, L McAuliffe 0-1.		R Cummins 1-2, D Hartnett 1-0, F O'Connell 1-0, N O'Keeffe 0-3, B Field 0-1, E O'Donoghue 0-1, P Kavanagh 0-1.

2 August 1974 Quarter-final replay	St. Nicholas'	4-06 - 1-06	St Michael's	Cork Athletic Grounds, Cork
	T O'Brien 2-0, F Cunningham 1-1, D Coughlan 1-1, P Harte 0-3, JJ O'Neill 0-1.		N O'Keeffe 1-0, R Cummins 0-3, E O'Donoghue 0-2, B Field 0-1.

=== Semi-finals ===
28 July 1974 Semi-final	Carbery	3-10 - 0-05	Dohenys	Clonakilty
	T Murphy 0-6, D Hunt 1-1, D Barron 1-0, R Wilmot 1-0, T Holland 0-1, B Evans 0-1, J Gabriel 0-1.		D Collins 0-3, V O'Sullivan 0-1, A Collins 0-1.

29 September 1974 Semi-final	Nemo Rangers	1-11 - 1-03	St. Nicholas'	The Mardyke, Cork
	S Coughlan 1-3, C Murphy 0-3, L Good 0-3, K Collins 0-1, M O@Donoghue 0-1.		P Harte 1-0, F Cunningham 0-1, D Coughlan 0-1, M Corbett 0-1.	Referee: F Halbert (Glenville)

=== Final ===
6 October 1974 Final	Nemo Rangers	2-08 - 1-08	Carbery	The Mardyke, Cork
	L Good 1-0, N Morgan 1-0, J Barrett 0-3, K Collins 0-2, S Coughlan 0-1, B Cogan 0-1, C Murphy 0-1.		D Hunt 1-2, T Murphy 0-4, T Holland 0-1, D Barron 0-1.	Attendance: 10,730

== Championship statistics ==
=== Top scorers ===
Overall

Rank	Player	Club	Tally	Total	Matches	Average
1	Tony Murphy	Carbery	0-22	22	4	5.50
2	Denis Collins	Dohenys	1-15	18	4	4.50
3	Teddy O'Brien	St. Nicholas'	3-06	15	4	3.00
3	Donal Hunt	Carbery	3-06	15	4	3.00
3	Colm Murphy	Nemo Rangers	3-06	15	4	3.00
6	Ray Cummins	St Michael's	1-11	14	3	4.66
7	Jerry McCarthy	St. Finbarr's	1-10	13	2	6.50
7	Denis Coughlan	St. Nicholas'	1-10	13	5	2.40
9	Liam Good	Nemo Rangers	2-06	12	4	3.00
10	Donal Curran	Seandún	3-02	11	2	5.50
10	Vincent O'Sullivan	Dohenys	2-05	11	4	2.75
10	Patsy Harte	St. Nicholas'	2-05	11	5	2.20

In a single game

Rank	Player	Club	Tally	Total	Opposition
1	Colm Murphy	Nemo Rangers	3-01	10	Na Piarsaigh
1	Jerry McCarthy	St. Finbarr's	1-07	10	Carrigdhoun
3	Donal Curran	Seandún	2-01	7	Avondhu
3	Tony Murphy	Carbery	0-07	7	Beara
5	Teddy O'Brien	St. Nicholas'	2-00	6	St Michael's
5	Séamus Coughlan	Nemo Rangers	1-03	6	St. Nicholas'
5	Pat Griffin	Clonakilty	1-03	6	Imokilly
5	Jimmy Barrett	Nemo Rangers	1-03	6	St. Finbarr's
5	Ray Cummins	St Michael's	0-06	6	Seandún
5	Denis Collins	Dohenys	0-06	6	Millstreet
5	Tony Murphy	Carbery	0-06	6	Dohenys
