= 1972 Cork Senior Football Championship =

Gaelic football competition

- Dates: 7 April – 19 November 1972
- Teams: 18
- Champions: Nemo Rangers (1st title); Billy Morgan (captain)
- Runners-up: University College Cork; Jim Gleeson (captain)

Tournament statistics
- Matches played: 18
- Goals scored: 56 (3.11 per match)
- Points scored: 251 (13.94 per match)
- Top scorer(s): Dinny Allen (1-18)

The 1972 Cork Senior Football Championship was the 84th staging of the Cork Senior Football Championship since its establishment by the Cork County Board in 1887. The draw for the opening round fixtures took place on 30 January 1972. The championship ran from 7 April to 19 November 1972.

Carbery entered the championship as the defending champions, however, they were beaten by Muskerry in the quarter-finals.

The final was played on 19 November 1972 at the Athletic Grounds in Cork between Nemo Rangers and University College Cork in what was their first ever meeting in the final. Nemo Rangers won the match by 2-09 to 0-08 to claim their first ever championship title.

Dinny Allen was the championship's top scorer with 1-18.

== Team changes ==
=== To Championship ===
Promoted from the Cork Intermediate Football Championship

- Newcestown

== Results ==
=== First round ===
7 May 1972 First round	Seandún	1-07 - 2-09	Millstreet	Castle Grounds
	D Murphy 1-1, V Twomey 0-3, B Meade 0-3.		T Kelleher 1-2, D Long 0-5, C Kelleher 1-0, L Sweeney 0-1, T Burke 0-1.

16 June 1972 First round	Na Piarsaigh	0-06 - 0-10	St Michael's	Cork Athletic Grounds
	R Whitley 0-2, P McCarthy 0-2, P Buckley 0-1, D Sheehan 0-1.		N O'Keeffe 0-6, D McCarthy 0-1, P Kavanagh 0-1, J Brohan 0-1, P Moylan 0-1.

=== Second round ===
7 April 1972 Second round	Macroom	1-04 - 2-10	Muskerry	Castle Grounds
	J Downey 1-0, E Hallinan 0-1, T O'Sullivan 0-1, L Quinlan 0-1.		S Murphy 1-2, N Dunne 0-5, C Twomey 1-1, D Murphy 0-1, D McCarthy 0-1.	Referee: F Halbert (Glenville)

30 April 1972 Second round	Clonakilty	1-07 - 2-08	University College Cork	Charlie Hurley Park
	TF Hayes 0-5, P Griffin 1-0, S McCarthy 1-0, P Finn 0-1.		D Kavanagh 2-0, B Lynch 0-5, N Sullivan 0-1, N Brosnan 0-1,	Referee: F Halbert (Glenville)

30 April 1972 Second round	Carrigdhoun	3-08 - 4-08	Duhallow	Coachford Sportsfield
	N White 2-2, G Hanley 1-4, M Tobin 0-2.		S Kelly 2-0, TD Cronin 1-1, J Sullivan 1-1, Dl Burke 0-3, B Daly 0-1, D Dennehy 0-1, J Collins 0-1.	Referee: D O'Mahony (Kilmichael)

30 April 1972 Second round	Carbery	6-08 - 4-08	St. Finbarr's	Charlie Hurley Park
	D Hunt 1-4, D Barron 2-0, T Holland 1-2, T Murphy 1-1, J Carroll 1-1.		M Archer 1-1, J Barry-Murphy 1-0, F Twomey 1-0, C McCarthy 1-0, E Philpott 0-3, M Fleming 0-3, E Fitzpatrick 0-1.	Referee: J Dennigan (Fermoy)

6 May 1972 Second round	Avondhu	2-14 - 2-08	Imokilly	Cork Athletic Grounds
	T Monaghan 1-3, N Kirby 0-6, T Linehan 1-0, DJ Ryan 0-2, M Golden 0-2, T Molan 0-1.		S O'Connor 0-5, E Ryan 1-1, W Glavin 1-1, T Johnston 0-1.	Referee: M McCarthy (St. Nicholas')

3 June 1972 Second round	Nemo Rangers	0-08 - 0-03	St. Nicholas'	Cork Athletic Grounds
	K Collins 0-4, N Morgan 0-2, S McGann 0-1, M O'Donoghue 0-1.		P Harte 0-3.	Referee: F Halbert

4 June 1972 Second round	Beara	1-03 - 1-08	Newcestown	Wolfe Tone Park
	Jerry Ger O'Sullivan 1-0, M Driscoll 0-2, EJ O'Sullivan 0-1.		M O'Callaghan 1-2, G O'Leary 0-3, A Flynn 0-2, N Kehilly 0-1.	Referee: P Donovan (Bantry)

23 July 1972 Second round	Millstreet	0-08 - 1-09	St Michael's	O'Connell Park
	D Long 0-6, L McSweeney 0-2.		T Murphy 1-0, N O'Keeffe 0-3, R Cummins 0-3, B Field 0-1, J Brohan 0-1, E O'Donoghue 0-1.

=== Quarter-finals ===
18 June 1972 Quarter-final	Carbery	1-06 - 1-11	Muskerry	Castle Grounds
	T Murphy 0-4, B O'Rourke 1-0, J Carroll 0-2.		N Dunne 0-5, S McCarthy 1-0, F Cooper 0-1, C Twomey 0-1, M Mehigan 0-1, J Lynch 0-1, S Murphy 0-1, C Kelly 0-1.	Referee: F Halbert (Glenville)

23 July 1972 Quarter-final	Nemo Rangers	3-13 - 3-09	Avondhu	Páirc Mac Gearailt
	N Morgan 1-2, J Barrett 0-5, S McGann 1-1, B Cogan 1-0, D Allen 0-3, K Collins 0-1, M O'Donoghue 0-1.		DJ Ryan 1-2, N Kirby 0-5, W McAuliffe 1-0, M Golden 0-1, T Linehan 0-1.	Referee: L Meade (Ballinascarty)

23 July 1972 Quarter-final	University College Cork	4-06 - 1-05	Duhallow	Newmarket Grounds
	D Kavanagh 1-1, N Brosnan 1-1, D Cotter 1-1, D Murray 1-0, P Lynch 0-2, D Coffey 0-1.		B Eardley 1-1, D Burke 0-2, S Kelly 0-1, J O'Sullivan 0-1.	Referee: J Dennigan (Fermoy)

17 September 1972 Quarter-final	St Michael's	4-12 - 0-05	Newcestown	Ballinspittle Grounds
	D Hartnett 3-1, J Brohan 1-2, N O'Keeffe 0-4, B Field 0-2, E O'Donoghue 0-1, P Kavanagh 0-1, R Cummins 0-1.		N Kehilly 0-1, A O'Flynn 0-1, M O'Callaghan 0-1, J O'Leary 0-1, J O'Callaghan 0-1.	Referee: J Dennigan (Fermoy)

=== Semi-finals ===
8 October 1972 Semi-final	Nemo Rangers	1-08 - 1-08	St Michael's	Cork Athletic Grounds
	D Allen 0-5, B Cogan 1-1, K Collins 0-1, M O'Donoghue 0-1.		E O'Donoghue 1-1, N O'Keeffe 0-3, B O'Loughlin 0-2, B Field 0-2.	Referee: J Dennigan (Fermoy)

8 October 1972 Semi-final	University College Cork	0-11 - 1-03	Muskerry	Cloughduv Grounds
	D Kavanagh 0-3, D Coffey 0-3, D Cotter 0-2, R Bambury 0-1, P Lynch 0-1.		S Murphy 1-0, S McCarthy 0-1, C Kelly 0-1, M Mehigan 0-1.

22 October 1972 Semi-final replay	Nemo Rangers	4-05 - 1-10	St Michael's	Cork Athletic Grounds
	J Barrett 2-1, D Allen 0-4, S Coughlan 1-0, N Morgan 1-0.		N O'Keeffe 1-4, P Kavanagh 0-2, B O'Loughlin 0-1, B Field 0-1, E O'Donoghue 0-1, S Rothwell 0-1.

=== Final ===
19 November 1972 Final	Nemo Rangers	2-09 - 0-08	University College Cork	Cork Athletic Grounds, Cork
	D Allen 1-6, S Coughlan 1-0, N Morgan 0-2, F Cogan 0-1.		B Lynch 0-5, D Kavanagh 0-1, P Lynch 0-1, D Coffey 0-1.	Attendance: 4,015; Referee: F Halbert

== Championship statistics ==
=== Top scorers ===
Top scorers overall

Rank	Player	Club	Tally	Total	Matches	Average
1	Dinny Allen	Nemo Rangers	1-18	21	5	4.20
2	Neally O'Keeffe	St Michael's	1-17	20	5	4.00
3	Dan Kavanagh	UCC	3-05	14	4	3.50
4	Noel Morgan	Nemo Rangers	2-06	12	5	2.40
4	Jimmy Barrett	Nemo Rangers	2-06	12	5	2.40
6	Ned Kirby	Avondhu	0-11	11	2	5.50
6	Dinny Long	Millstreet	0-11	11	2	5.50
8	Derry Hartnett	St Michael's	3-01	10	5	2.00
8	Noel Dunne	Muskerry	0-10	10	3	3.33
8	Brendan Lynch	UCC	0-10	10	2	5.00

Top scorers in a single game

Rank	Player	Club	Tally	Total	Opposition
1	Derry Hartnett	St Michael's	3-01	10	Newcestown
2	Dinny Allen	Nemo Rangers	1-06	9	UCC
3	Neilly White	Carrigdhoun	2-02	8	Duhallow
4	Jimmy Barrett	Nemo Rangers	2-01	7	St Michael's
4	Gerald Hanley	Carrigdhoun	1-04	7	Duhallow
4	Donal Hunt	Carbery	1-04	7	St. Finbarr's
4	Neally O'Keeffe	St Michael's	1-04	7	Nemo Rangers
8	Dan Kavanagh	UCC	2-00	6	Clonakilty
8	Seán Kelly	Duhallow	2-00	6	Carrigdhoun
8	Declan Barron	Carbery	2-00	6	St. Finbarr's
8	Tom Monaghan	Avondhu	1-03	6	Imokilly
8	Neally O'Keeffe	St Michael's	0-06	6	Na Piarsaigh
8	Ned Kirby	Avondhu	0-06	6	Imokilly
8	Dinny Long	Millstreet	0-06	6	St Michael's

=== Miscellaneous ===
- Nemo Rangers win their first title.
