= 1975 Cork Senior Football Championship =

Gaelic football competition

- Dates: 6 April 1975 – 21 September 1975
- Teams: 20
- Champions: Nemo Rangers (3rd title); Frank Cogan (captain)
- Runners-up: Dohenys; Colman O'Rourke (captain)

Tournament statistics
- Matches played: 20
- Goals scored: 79 (3.95 per match)
- Points scored: 332 (16.6 per match)
- Top scorer(s): Dinny Allen (5-13)

The 1975 Cork Senior Football Championship was the 87th staging of the Cork Senior Football Championship since its establishment by the Cork County Board in 1887. The draw for the opening round fixtures took place on 26 January 1975. The championship began on 6 April 1975 and ended on 21 September 1975.

Nemo Rangers entered the championship as the defending champions.

On 21 September 1975, Nemo Rangers won the championship following a 4-12 to 0-07 defeat of Dohenys in the final. This was their third championship title overall and their second title in succession.

Nemo's Dinny Allen was the championship's top scorer with 5-13.

== Team changes ==
=== To Championship ===
Promoted from the Cork Intermediate Football Championship

- Bishopstown

== Results ==
=== First round ===
6 April 1975 First round	Clonakilty	3-11 - 3-06	Carrigdhoun	Ballinspittle
	M Leahy 1-2, TF Hayes 0-5, D McCarthy 1-1, J Donovan 1-1, P Griffin 0-1, F O'Regan 0-1.		P Tuohy 1-1, G Hanley 0-4, C O'Callaghan 1-0, J Hurley 1-0, M Burke 0-1.

6 April 1975 First round	Na Piarsaigh	3-07 - 2-09	University College Cork	Ballinlough Stadium, Ballinlough
	R Whitley 1-1, S Twomey 1-1, J O'Sullivan 1-1, T Nott 0-2, G Moynihan 0-1, L Nott 0-1.		T Foley 1-3, B Murphy 1-1, S Murphy 0-3, E O'Sullivan 0-1, S O'Shea 0-1.

18 May 1975 First round	St Michael's	0-04 - 5-15	Carbery	Coachford
	R Cummins 0-2, E O'Donoghue 0-1, P Kavanagh 0-1.		D Barron 4-3, T Murphy 0-7, J Riordan 1-0, M Burns 0-2, C Collins 0-1, R Wilmot 0-1, T Crowley 0-1.

25 May 1975 First round	Canovee	0-05 - 2-10	Nemo Rangers	Coachford
	P Mehigan 0-3, M Mehigan 0-1, T O'Mahony 0-1.		D Allen 1-2, K Collins 1-1, S Coughlan 0-3, D Murphy 0-2, S Leyden 0-1, C Murphy 0-1.

=== Second round ===
6 April 1975 Second round	Muskerry	0-11 - 1-05	Avondhu	Ballinlough Stadium, Ballinlough
	C Twomey 0-3, J O'Leary 0-2, P Corkery 0-2, F Cooper 0-1, V Coakley 0-1, P Lynch 0-1.		K McGann 1-0, J Courtney 0-2, M Dennehy 0-2, E O'Sullivan 0-1.

13 April 1975 Second round	Millstreet	3-04 - 3-05	Macroom	Coachford
	D O'Shea 2-0, J Kenneally 1-2, T Kelleher 0-1, T Burke 0-1.		S Noonan 1-1, E Hallinan 1-0, Tim O'Sullivan 1-0, L Gould 0-2, Tony O'Sullivan 0-1, L Quinlan 0-1.

13 April 1975 Second round	Bishopstown	3-11 - 2-04	Seandún	Church Road, Blackrock
	S Lynch 1-5, D Murphy 2-0, M Fleming 0-4, J Crowley 0-1, M Crowley 0-1.		B Meade 1-3, M O'Regan 1-0, T O'Brien 0-1.

27 April 1975 Second round	St. Nicholas'	1-09 - 0-13	St. Finbarr's	Ballinlough Stadium, Bllinlough
	P Shorrt 0-5, F O'Sullivan 1-0, P Harte 0-2, T O'Neill 0-1, R O'Mahony 0-1.		J Barry-Murphy 0-3, E Fitzpatrick 0-3, E McCarthy 0-3, J McCarthy 0-2, M Lynch 0-1, H Kennedy 0-1.

4 May 1975 Second round	Duhallow	3-07 - 2-08	Beara	Ballingeary
	G O'Sullivan 2-2, C Kearney 1-2, D Buckley 0-2, D Fitzgerald 0-1.		EG O'Sullivan 1-5, M Hanley 1-0, B Twomey 0-2, JG O'Sullivan 0-1.

18 May 1975 Second round	Dohenys	1-13 - 1-08	Imokilly	Ballinhassig
	D Collins 0-5, V O'Sullivan 1-1, C O'Rourke 0-4, E Cagney 0-2, D Crowley 0-1.		M McGee 0-6, T Murphy 1-0, W Glavin 0-1, W Keane 0-1.

22 June 1975 Second round	Clonakilty	3-12 - 2-01	Na Piarsaigh	Innishannon
	TF Hayes 0-5, J O'Donovan 1-1, K Dillon 1-0, P Coogan 1-0, D McCarthy 0-3, P Griffin 0-2, M Leahy 0-1.		R Whitley 1-0, R Tuohy 1-0, F Buckley 0-1.

10 August 1975 Second round	Carbery	2-08 - 2-10	Nemo Rangers	Castle Grounds, Macroom
	T Holland 1-1, D Barron 1-0, T Murphy 0-3, M Burns 0-2, D Crowley 0-2.		J Barrett 1-1, D Allen 0-4, D Linehan 1-0, N Morgan 0-2, K Collins 0-1, S Coughlan 0-1, C Murphy 0-1.

=== Quarter-finals ===
4 May 1975 Quarter-final	Bishopstown	4-09 - 4-01	Macroom	Coachford
	E McCarthy 3-0, D Healy 1-5, J Lynch 0-3, J Crowley 0-1.		Tony O'Sullivan 2-0, S Noonan 1-0, L Quinlan 1-0, L Gould 0-1.

8 June 1975 Quarter-final	Dohenys	2-11 - 2-10	Muskerry	Clonakilty
	D Crowley 2-0, C O'Rourke 0-3, J Collins 0-3, D Collins 0-2, B O'Rourke 0-2, V O'Sullivan 0-1.		D McCarthy 1-6, F Cooper 1-0, V Coakley 0-3, G Lynch 0-1.

6 July 1975 Quarter-final	St. Finbarr's	3-11 - 2-04	Duhallow	Castle Grounds, Macroom
	J Barry-Murphy 1-2, J McCarthy 0-4, D Murray 1-0, F Twomey 1-0, E Fitzpatrick 0-3, E McCarthy 0-1, B Manley 0-1.		P O'Connor 1-1, C Kearney 1-0, D Buckley 0-2, DJ O'Keeffe 0-1.

24 August 1975 Quarter-final	Nemo Rangers	3-12 - 0-05	Clonakilty	Kinsale
	K Collins 0-5, D Allen 1-1, J Barrett 1-1, C Murphy 1-1, S Coughlan 0-2, N Morgan 0-1, D Murphy 0-1.		D McCarthy 0-1, S McCarthy 0-1, TF Hayes 0-1, J O'Donovan 0-1, P Griffin 0-1.

=== Semi-finals ===
6 July 1975 Semi-final	Dohenys	1-10 - 1-05	Bishopstown	Charlie Hurley Park, Bandon
	C O'Rourke 0-4, D Crowley 1-0, J Carroll 0-3, J Collins 0-2, V O'Sullivan 0-1.		J Lynch 1-1, D Murphy 0-4.

6 September 1975 Semi-final	Nemo Rangers	2-10 - 3-07	St. Finbarr's	The Mardyke, Cork
	D Allen 1-4, N Morgan 1-0, C Murphy 0-2, S Coughlan 0-2, J Barrett 0-1, K Collins 0-1.		J McCarthy 1-4, T Goulding 2-0, F Twomey 0-2, D Murray 0-1.

14 September 1975 Semi-final replay	Nemo Rangers	2-09 - 0-13	St. Finbarr's	The Mardyke
	D Allen 1-2, S Coughlan 0-4, C Murphy 1-0, J Barrett 0-2, N Morgan 0-1.		J McCarthy 0-5, J Barry-Murphy 0-3, D Murray 0-2, F Twomey 0-1, E McCarthy 0-1, T Goulding 0-1,

=== Final ===
21 September 1975 Final	Nemo Rangers	4-12 - 0-07	Dohenys	The Mardyke, Cork
	N Morgan 2-3, S Coughlan 0-4, C Murphy 1-0, D Allen 1-0, K Collins 0-3, S Leydon 0-1, J Barrett 0-1.		C O'Rourke 0-3, D Collins 0-2, J Carroll 0-1, J Collins 0-1.	Attendance: 8,030; Referee: J Dennigan (Fermoy)

== Championship statistics ==
=== Top scorers ===
Overall

Rank	Player	Club	Tally	Total	Matches	Average
1	Dinny Allen	Nemo Rangers	5-13	28	6	4.66
2	Declan Barron	Carbery	5-03	18	2	9.00
2	Gerry McCarthy	St. Finbarr's	1-15	18	4	4.50
4	Noel Morgan	Nemo Rangers	3-07	16	6	2.66
4	Séamus Coughlan	Nemo Rangers	0-16	16	6	2.66
6	Colm Murphy	Nemo Rangers	3-05	14	6	2.33
6	Kieran Collins	Nemo Rangers	1-11	14	6	2.33
6	Colman O'Rourke	Dohenys	0-14	14	4	3.50
9	Jimmy Barrett	Nemo Rangers	2-06	12	6	2.00
10	Jimmy Barry-Murphy	St. Finbarr's	1-08	11	4	2.75
10	Tim F. Hayes	Clonakilty	0-11	11	3	3.66

In a single game

Rank	Player	Club	Tally	Total	Opposition
1	Declan Barron	Carbery	4-03	15	St Michael's
2	Gene McCarthy	Bishopstown	3-00	9	Macroom
2	Noel Morgan	Nemo Rangers	2-03	9	Dohenys
2	Diarmuid McCarthy	Muskerry	1-06	9	Dohenys
5	Gerard O'Sullivan	Duhallow	2-02	8	Beara
5	Eddie Ger O'Sullivan	Beara	1-05	8	Duhallow
5	Seán Lynch	Bishopstown	1-05	8	Seandún
5	Denis Healy	Bishopstown	1-05	8	Macroom
9	Dinny Allen	Nemo Rangers	1-04	7	St. Finbarr's
9	Gerry McCarthy	St. Finbarr's	1-04	7	Nemo Rangers
9	Tony Murphy	Carbery	0-07	7	St Michael's

=== Miscellaneous ===
- Na Piarsaigh recorded their first ever championship victory since promotion to the senior grade in 1967.
- Dohenys qualified for the final for the first time since 1897.
