= 1973 Cork Senior Football Championship =

Gaelic football competition

- Dates: 1 April 1973 – 30 September 1973
- Teams: 19
- Champions: University College Cork (8th title); Tom Looney (captain)
- Runners-up: Carbery; Donal Hunt (captain)

Tournament statistics
- Matches played: 22
- Goals scored: 73 (3.32 per match)
- Points scored: 406 (18.45 per match)
- Top scorer(s): Jim Kenneally (3-20)

The 1973 Cork Senior Football Championship was the 85th staging of the Cork Senior Football Championship since its establishment by the Cork County Board in 1887. The draw for the opening round fixtures took place on 28 January 1973. The championship began on 1 April 1973 and ended on 30 September 1973.

Nemo Rangers entered the championship as the defending champions, however, they were defeated by St. Finbarr's in the first round.

On 30 September 1973, University College Cork won the championship following a 3-08 to 1-10 defeat of Carbery in the final. This was their 8th championship title overall and their first since 1969.

Millstreet's Jim Kenneally was the championship's top scorer with 3-20.

== Team changes ==
=== To Championship ===
Promoted from the Cork Intermediate Football Championship

- Dohenys

== Results ==
=== First round ===
8 April 1973 First round	St. Finbarr's	0-09 - 0-07	Nemo Rangers	Cork Athletic Grounds, Cork
	S Gillen 0-5, E Philpott 0-2, J Barry-Murphy 0-2.		M O'Donoghue 0-2, S Leyden 0-2, C Murphy 0-1, D Cogan 0-1, S Coughlan 0-1.	Referee: F Halbert

8 April 1973 First round	Beara	1-09 - 1-09	Millstreet	Sam Maguire Park, Dunmanway
	JJ Murphy 1-1, B Hanley 0-2, B O'Neill 0-2, N Murphy 0-1, J O'Neill 0-1, EJ O'Sullivan 0-1, N O'Sullivan 0-1.		D O'Shea 1-1, D Long 0-3, T Kelleher 0-2, A Kiely 0-1, D O'Hare 0-1, J Kenneally 0-1.	Referee: J McDonnell

15 April 1973 First round replay	Beara	1-07 - 0-10	Millstreet	Sam Maguire Park, Dunmanway
	B Hanley 0-4, J O'Neill 1-0, EJ O'Sullivan 0-1, JJ Murphy 0-1, B O'Neill 0-1.		J Kenneally 0-6, T Kelleher 0-2, D O'Shea 0-1, D O'Hare 0-1.	Referee: J McDonnell

22 April 1973 First round	Newcestown	1-07 - 2-08	Carbery	Clonakilty
	J O'Leary 0-5, M O'Callaghan 1-1, K Kehilly 0-1.		D Barron 2-1, D Hunt 0-2, T Murphy 0-2, B Murphy 0-1, M Burns 0-1, T Holland 0-1.

29 April 1973 First round 2nd replay	Beara	0-06 - 3-14	Millstreet	Sam Maguire Park, Dunmanway
	B Hanley 0-3, EJ O'Sullivan 0-1, J O'Neill 0-1, KJ O'Sullivan 0-1.		A Kiely 2-1, D O'Shea 1-2, J Kenneally 0-3, T Kelleher 0-3, T Burke 0-3, D Long 0-2.	Referee: J McDonnell

=== Second round ===
1 April 1973 Second round	Avondhu	2-04 - 1-07	Clonakilty	Cork Athletic Grounds, Cork
	N Kirby 1-2, T Monaghan 1-0, DJ Ryan 0-1, B Honohan 0-1.		P Griffin 1-0, TF Hayes 0-3, M Leahy 0-2, P Finn 0-1, D McCarthy 0-1.	Referee: F Halbert

1 April 1973 Second round	Na Piarsaigh	1-05 - 6-12	University College Cork	Cork Athletic Grounds, Cork
	D O'Sullivan 0-4, J O'Sullivan 1-0, B Joyce 0-1.		B Lynch 1-7, D Kavanagh 1-1, D Cotter 1-1, D Murray 1-0, S O'Shea 1-0, P Lynch 1-0, N Sullivan 0-1, F Hanlon 0-1, N Brosnan 0-1.	Referee: P Finnegan

1 April 1973 Second round	Duhallow	1-08 - 1-11	Macroom	Millstreet
	TD Cronin 1-0, B Daly 0-3, DJ O'Keeffe 0-2, D Buckley 0-2, N Collins 0-1.		J Downey 1-2, T O'Sullivan 0-4, L Gould 0-2, S Noonan 0-2, G Kelleher 0-1.	Referee: D Twomey

1 April 1973 Second round	Dohenys	2-11 - 1-03	Imokilly	Kinsale
	V O'Sullivan 1-1, D Collins 0-4, R Rourke 1-0, A Collins 0-2, J Carroll 0-2, C Rourke 0-2.		S O'Connor 1-0, W Glavin 0-1, B Óg Murphy 0-1, E Kelleher 0-1.	Referee: P Cronin

8 April 1973 Second round	St. Nicholas'	2-14 - 0-04	Seandún	Cork Athletic Grounds, Cork
	T O'Mahony 1-4, T O'Brien 1-2, P Harte 0-3, P Doherty 0-1, D Coughlan 0-1, JJ O'Neill 0-1, L McAuliffe 0-1, F Crowley 0-1.		O O'Brien 0-1, M Fleming 0-1, B Meade 0-1, D Healy 0-1.	Referee: D O'Brien

8 April 1973 Second round	Carrigdhoun	1-04 - 3-12	St Michael's	Manning Park, Passage
	J Barrett 1-0, M Burke 0-3, P Tuohy 0-1.		B Field 1-4, R Cummins 1-2, B O'Loughlin 1-0, M Lynch 0-2, N O'Keeffe 0-2, P Moylan 0-1, F O'Connell 0-1.	Referee: A Twomey

6 May 1973 Second round	Millstreet	4-11 - 3-07	Muskerry	Macroom
	J Kenneally 2-4, D O'Shea 1-1, D O'Hare 1-0, T Burke 0-3, D Long 0-2, T Kelleher 0-1.		N Dunne 2-5, M Malone 1-0, S Murphy 0-2.	Referee: S McDonnell

13 May 1973 Second round replay	Avondhu	2-18 - 3-18 (aet)	Clonakilty	Cork Athletic Grounds, Cork
	J Barrett 0-11, N Kirby 0-5, T Sheehan 1-0, DJ Ryan 1-0, J Cummins 0-1, B Honohan 0-1.		K Dillon 2-1, M Leahy 0-6, B Keohane 1-1, T Hayes 0-3, TF Hayes 0-3, D McCarthy 0-2, P Finn 0-1, P Griffin 0-1.	Referee: F Halbert

3 June 1973 Second round	Carbery	3-10 - 3-08	St. Finbarr's	Kinsale
	M Burns 2-1, T Murphy 0-6, D Barron 1-0, J Gabriel 0-2, B Evans 0-1.		T Moore 1-1, E Philpott 0-4, J Barry-Murphy 1-0, B Murphy 1-0, G Ahern 0-1, S Gillen 0-1, F Twomey 0-1.	Referee: J Dennigan

=== Quarter-finals ===
20 May 1973 Quarter-final	St. Nicholas'	1-13 - 0-09	Dohenys	Innishannon
	T O'Brien 1-2, P Harte 0-5, T O'Mahony 0-2, R Crowley 0-2, JJ O'Neill 0-1, M O'Halloran 0-1.		D Collins 0-2, B Rourke 0-2, V O'Sullivan 0-1, C Rourke 0-1, A Collins 0-1, K Driscoll 0-1, J Carroll 0-1.	Referee: J Dennigan

24 June 1973 Quarter-final	University College Cork	4-07 - 0-13	Clonakilty	Charlie Hurley Park, Bandon
	S O'Shea 2-0, B Lynch 0-5, D Cotter 1-1, D Kavanagh 1-0, N Brosnan 0-1.		TF Hayes 0-5, S McCarthy 0-3, P Griffin 0-2, T Hayes 0-1, D Keohane 0-1, D McCarthy 0-1.	Referee: F Halbert

24 June 1973 Quarter-final	Carbery	1-08 - 1-08	Millstreet	Macroom
	T Murphy 0-4, D Hunt 1-0, T Holland 0-1, M Burns 0-1, J O'Riordan 0-1, B Evans 0-1.		J Kenneally 0-5, A Kiely 1-1, T Kelleher 0-1, D Long 0-1.	Referee: J Dennigan

26 June 1973 Quarter-final	St Michael's	1-12 - 2-07	Macroom	Cloughduv
	B Field 0-8, N O'Keeffe 1-2, R Cummins 0-1, E O'Donoghue 0-1.		J Gould 0-6, T Noonan 1-1, M Browne 1-0.	Referee: L Meade

22 July 1973 Quarter-final replay	Carbery	3-11 - 2-12	Millstreet	Macroom
	D Hunt 2-1, T Holland 1-3, T Murphy 0-3, B Evans 0-1, M Burns 0-1, J Weldon 0-1, D Barron 0-1.		A Kiely 1-2, J Kenneally 1-1, D Long 0-4, T Kelleher 0-3, D O'Shea 0-1, D O'Hare 0-1.	Referee: J Dennigan

=== Semi-finals ===
29 July 1973 Semi-final	St. Nicholas'	1-09 - 3-08	Carbery	Coachford
	P Harte 0-5, T O'Brien 1-1, T O'Mahony 0-1, R Crowley 0-1, JJ O'Neill 0-1.		T Murphy 1-4, D Barron 1-1, J O'Riordan 1-0, R Wilmot 0-1, B Evans 0-1, B Murphy 0-1.	Referee: F Halbert

22 August 1973 Semi-final	University College Cork	2-06 - 0-11	St Michael's	Cork Athletic Grounds, Cork
	D Kavanagh 1-0, B Lynch 0-3, D Murphy 0-1, N Brosnan 0-1, T Looney 0-1.		N O'Keeffe 0-6, E O'Donoghue 0-2, R Cummins 0-1, F O'Connell 0-1, D Hartnett 0-1.	Referee: J Dennigan

=== Final ===
30 September 1973 Final	University College Cork	3-09 - 1-10	Carbery	Cork Athletic Grounds, Cork
	B Lynch 0-8, D Kavanagh 2-0, J McMahon 1-0, N O'Sullivan 0-1.		T Murphy 0-8, D Hunt 1-0, T Holland 0-1, R Wilmot 0-1.	Attendance: 10,991; Referee: F Halbert

== Career statistics ==
=== Top scorers ===
Top scorers overall

Rank	Player	Club	Tally	Total
1	Jim Kenneally	Millstreet	3-20	29
2	Tony Murphy	Carbery	1-27	30
3	Brendan Lynch	UCC	1-23	26
4	Andy Kiely	Millstreet	4-05	17
5	Dan Kavanagh	UCC	5-01	16
6	Donal Hunt	Carbery	4-03	15
6	Declan Barron	Carbery	4-03	15
6	D. O'Shea	Millstreet	3-06	15
6	Billy Field	St Michael's	1-12	15
10	Teddy O'Brien	St. Nicholas'	3-05	14

Top scorers in a single game

Rank	Player	Club	Tally	Total	Opposition
1	Jimmy Barrett	Avondhu	0-11	11	Clonakilty
2	Jim Kenneally	Millstreet	2-04	10	Muskerry
2	Brendan Lynch	UCC	1-07	10	Na Piarsaigh
4	Billy Field	St Michael's	0-08	8	Macroom
4	Brendan Lynch	UCC	0-08	8	Carbery
4	Tony Murphy	Carbery	0-08	8	UCC
7	Donal Hunt	Carbery	2-01	7	Millstreet
7	Declan Barron	Carbery	2-01	7	Newcestown
7	Andy Kiely	Millstreet	2-01	7	Beara
7	Kevin Dillon	Clonakilty	2-01	7	Avondhu
7	Mick Burns	Carbery	2-01	7	St. Finbarr's
7	Tim O'Mahony	St. Nicholas'	1-04	7	Seandún
7	Billy Field	St Michael's	1-04	7	Carrigdhoun
7	Tony Murphy	Carbery	1-04	7	St. Nicholas'
