= Noel Murphy =

Noel Murphy may refer to:

- Noel Murphy (rugby union, born 1904) (1904–1987), Ireland rugby union international
- Noel Murphy (rugby union, born 1937), former Irish rugby union player
- Noel Murphy (musician) (born 1943), Irish-born singer, guitarist and humourist
- Noel Murphy (politician) (1915–2005), Canadian politician
- Noel Murphy (comedian) (born 1961), American stand-up comedian and film director
- Noel Murphy (Gaelic footballer) (born 1952), Irish Gaelic footballer
- Noel Murphy (hurler) (1936–1997), Irish hurler
