= Tom Naughton =

Irish Gaelic footballer, selector and manager

Personal information
- Native name: Tomás Ó Neachtain (Irish)
- Born: 1952 (age 73–74) Annaghdown, County Galway, Ireland
- Occupation: Car salesman
- Height: 5 ft 11 in (180 cm)

Sport
- Sport: Gaelic football
- Position: Right wing-forward
Club
- Years: Club
- Annaghdown
Club titles
- Galway titles: 3
Inter-county
- Years: County
- 1973–1987: Galway
Inter-county titles
- Connacht titles: 8
- All-Irelands: 0
- NFL: 1
- All Stars: 1

Thomas Naughton (born 1952) is an Irish former Gaelic footballer who played for the Annaghdown club and at inter-county level with the Galway senior football team. He later served as a selector and manager.

== Playing career ==
Naughton first played Gaelic football at juvenile and underage levels with the Annaghdown club. He eventually progressed to the club's senior team and claimed three Galway SFC titles in 1982, 1985 and 1987.

Naughton first appeared on the inter-county scene for Galway as a member of the minor team. He was an unused substitute when the minor team beat Kerry in the 1970 All-Ireland minor final replay. He progressed to the under-21 team and won an All-Ireland U21 medal in 1972. Naughton joined the Galway senior football team in 1973 and won the first of eight Connacht SFC medals in his debut season. He also made the first of three unsuccessful All-Ireland final appearances that year, losing to Cork before losing to Dublin in 1974 and 1983.

Naughton's only senior national title was a National League title in 1981. He also earned selection to the Connacht team in the Railway Cup and was named on the All-Star team in 1974.

== Managerial career ==
In retirement from playing, Naughton became involved in team management and coaching. He was appointed manager of the Galway minor team in advance of the 1993 All-Ireland MFC, however, his tenure was short-lived after he received a two-year suspension after a controversial game against Roscommon. Naughton later served under team manager Joe Kernan as a selector with the Galway senior team.

== Honours ==
Annaghdown

- Galway Senior Football Championship: 1982, 1985, 1987

Galway

- Connacht Senior Football Championship: 1973, 1974, 1976, 1982, 1983, 1984, 1986, 1987
- National Football League: 1980–81
- All-Ireland Under-21 Football Championship: 1972
- Connacht Under-21 Football Championship: 1972
- All-Ireland Minor Football Championship: 1970
- Connacht Minor Football Championship: 1970
