= Ned Kirby =

Irish Gaelic footballer (born 1949)

Personal information
- Native name: Éamonn Ó Ciarba (Irish)
- Born: 1949 (age 76–77) Glanworth, County Cork, Ireland
- Occupation: Garda Síochána
- Height: 5 ft 11 in (180 cm)

Sport
- Sport: Gaelic football
- Position: Right wing-forward
Clubs
- Years: Club
- 1966-1993 1967-1983 1973-1976: Grange → Avondhu; Blackrock
Club titles
- Cork titles: 0
Inter-county
Years	County	Apps (scores)
1969-1974	Cork	12 (0-09)
Inter-county titles
- Munster titles: 3
- All-Irelands: 1
- NFL: 0
- All Stars: 0

Edmond Kirby (born 1949) is a retired Gaelic footballer and hurler. At club level, he played with Grange and Blackrock and at inter-county level was a member of the Cork senior football team.

== Career ==
Kirby played both hurling and Gaelic football as a student at St Colman's College. He began his club career at juvenile and underage levels with the St Dominic's club, and won back-to-back Cork MFC titles in 1966 and 1967.

At adult level, Kirby's club career with Grange spanned four decades. He won four North Cork JAFC titles between 1966 and 1979, and was at centre-back for Grange's 0-14 to 2-04 win over Knocknagree to claim the Cork JFC title in 1979. Kirby also played hurling with Blackrock, and was part of their City JAHC title-winning team in 1973.

At inter-county level, Kirby first played for Cork as a dual player with the minor teams. He won Munster MHC and Munster MFC honours in 1967, before lining out at full-forward for Cork's 5-14 to 2-03 win over Laois in the 1967 All-Ireland minor football final. Kirby added an All-Ireland U21FC medal to his collection in 1970.

Kirby made his senior team debut during the 1969–70 National Football League. He dropped back to the junior team and also won a Munster JFC medal in that grade in 1970, before winning the first of three Munster SFC medals in 1971. Kirby was at right wing-forward for the 3-17 to 2-13 win over Galway in the 1973 All-Ireland final.

== Honours ==
St Dominic's

- Cork Minor Football Championship: 1966, 1967

Grange

- Cork Junior Football Championship: 1979
- North Cork Junior A Football Championship: 1966, 1970, 1977, 1979

Blackrock

- Cork City Junior A Hurling Championship: 1973

Cork

- All-Ireland Senior Football Championship: 1973
- Munster Senior Football Championship: 1971, 1973, 1974
- Munster Junior Football Championship: 1970
- All-Ireland Under-21 Football Championship: 1970
- Munster Under-21 Football Championship: 1969, 1970
- All-Ireland Minor Football Championship: 1967
- Munster Minor Football Championship: 1966, 1967
- Munster Minor Hurling Championship: 1967
