= Humphrey Kelleher =

Cork Gaelic footballer

Personal information
- Native name: Amhlaoibh Ó Céileachair (Irish)
- Born: 1946 Millstreet, County Cork, Ireland
- Died: 21 September 2005 (aged 59) Mallow, County Cork, Ireland
- Occupations: Fitter, mechanic
- Height: 6 ft 2 in (188 cm)

Sport
- Sport: Gaelic football
- Position: Full-back
Clubs
- Years: Club
- 1962–1978: Millstreet → Duhallow
Club titles
- Cork titles: 0
Inter-county
Years	County	Apps (scores)
1971–1975	Cork	14 (0–00)
Inter-county titles
- Munster titles: 3
- All-Irelands: 1
- NFL: 0
- All Stars: 0

Humphrey Kelleher (1946 – 21 September 2005) was an Irish Gaelic footballer. At club level, he played with Millstreet, divisional side Duhallow and at inter-county level with the Cork senior football team.

== Career ==
Kelleher first played Gaelic football and hurling at club level with Millstreet. He was still a teenager when he won consecutive Duhallow JHC titles in 1962 and 1963. Kelleher also won three Crowley Cup titles and a Kelleher Shield in 1971, however, injury resulted in his retirement in 1978.

At inter-county level, Kelleher first played for Cork as part of the junior team that won the Munster JFC title in 1970. This success resulted in him being drafted onto the senior team and he won the first of three Munster SFC medals in four years in 1971. Kelleher lined out at full-back when Cork beat Galway by 3–17 to 2–13 in the 1973 All-Ireland SFC final.

Kelleher's performances at inter-county level resulted in his inclusion on the Munster inter-provincial team between 1974 and 1976. He won consecutive Railway Cup medals during this time, after respective defeats of Ulster and Leinster.

== Death ==
Kelleher died on 21 September 2005, at the age of 59.

== Honours ==
Millstreet

- Kelleher Shield (1): 1971
- Duhallow Junior Hurling Championship (2): 1962, 1963

Cork

- All-Ireland Senior Football Championship (1): 1973
- Munster Senior Football Championship (3): 1971, 1973, 1974
- Munster Junior Football Championship (1): 1970

Munster

- Railway Cup (2): 1975, 1976
