= 1971 All-Ireland Minor Football Championship =

Gaelic football competition

Championship details

All-Ireland Champions
- Winning team: Mayo (4th win)
- Captain: John P. Kean

All-Ireland Finalists
- Losing team: Cork

Provincial Champions
- Munster: Cork
- Leinster: Dublin
- Ulster: Tyrone
- Connacht: Mayo

The 1971 All-Ireland Minor Football Championship was the 40th staging of the All-Ireland Minor Football Championship, the Gaelic Athletic Association's premier inter-county Gaelic football tournament for boys under the age of 18.

Galway entered the championship as defending champions, however, they were defeated by Mayo on a scoreline of 1-7 to 0-9 in the Connacht semi-final.

On 26 September 1971, Mayo won the championship following a 2-15 to 2-7 defeat of Cork in the All-Ireland final. This was their fourth All-Ireland title overall and their first title in five championship seasons.

== Results ==
=== Connacht Minor Football Championship ===
Quarter-Final

| 4 July 1971; Quarter-Final | Mayo | 5-18 – 0-02 | Leitrim | Páirc Seán Mac Diarmada, Carrick-on-Shannon |

Semi-Finals

| 4 July 1971; Semi-Final | Roscommon | 2-10 – 0-10 | Sligo | Dr Hyde Park, Roscommon |

| 11 July 1971; Semi-Final | Mayo | 1-07 – 0-09 | Galway | McHale Park, Castlebar |

Final

| 25 July 1971; Final | Mayo | 2-12 – 1-08 | Roscommon | McHale Park, Castlebar |

=== Munster Minor Football Championship ===
Quarter-Finals

| 1971; Quarter-Final | Clare | 3-12 – 1-03 | Limerick | Hennessy Memorial Park, Miltown Malbay |

| 1971; Quarter-Final | Waterford | 0-07 – 1-07 | Tipperary | Ned Hall Park, Clonmel |

Semi-Finals

| 1971; Semi-Final | Kerry | 2-16 – 2-01 | Tipperary | Páirc Mhic Gearailt, Fermoy |

| 1971; Semi-Final | Cork | 5-12 – 0-04 | Clare | Gaelic Grounds, Limerick |

Final

| 18 July 1971; Final | Cork | 2-13 – 1-02 | Kerry | Cork Athletic Grounds, Cork |

=== Leinster Minor Football Championship ===
First round

| 1971; First round | Wexford | 2-12 – 2-05 | Wicklow |

| 1971; First round | Carlow | 0-05 – 3-15 | Laois | Geraldine Park, Athy |

Second round

| 1971; Second round | Meath | 2-07 – 0-09 | Westmeath | O'Connor Park, Tullamore |

| 1971; Second round | Laois | 3-12 – 2-09 | Wexford | Dr Cullen Park, Carlow |

Quarter-Finals

| 1971; Quarter-Final | Offaly | 1-07 – 0-09 | Longford | Cusack Park, Mullingar |

| 1971; Quarter-Final | Wexford | 2-12 – 1-02 | Kilkenny | St Patrick's Park, Enniscorthy |

| 1971; Quarter-Final | Dublin | 0-13 – 0-10 | Laois | O'Moore Park, Portlaoise |

Semi-Finals

| 1971; Semi-Final | Meath | 2-06 – 1-12 | Louth | Croke Park, Dublin |

| 1971; Semi-Final | Dublin | 1-14 – 0-08 | Offaly | Croke Park, Dublin |

==== Final ====
| 25 July 1971 | Dublin | 2-07 – 0-04 | Louth | Croke Park, Dublin |
| | | | A. Hoey (0-3, 3f), S. Ross (0-1) | Referee: P. Clandillon (Wicklow) |

| GK | 1 | Tony Fayne (Scoil Ui Chonaill) |
| RCB | 2 | Dave Billings (St Vincent's) |
| FB | 3 | Dermot Hobbs (Scoil Ui Chonaill) |
| LCB | 4 | Gerry McCaul (Ballymun Kickhams) |
| RHB | 5 | Pat Glavey (Raheny) |
| CHB | 6 | Vinnie Holden (Cuala) |
| LHB | 7 | Brendan Pocock (St Vincent's) |
| MF | 8 | John McCarthy (Na Fianna) |
| MF | 9 | Bernard Salmon (Good Counsel) |
| RHF | 10 | Seán McCarthy (Kilmacud Crokes) |
| CHF | 11 | Pat Hickey (Raheny) |
| LHF | 12 | Dave Redmond (St Vincent's) |
| RCF | 13 | Mick Hickey (Raheny) |
| FF | 14 | Mick Holden (Cuala) |
| LCF | 15 | Martin O'Donoghue (Na Fianna) |
Substitutes:

| GK | 1 | Tom Matthews (Newtown Blues) |
| RCB | 2 | Andy Devine (St Mary's) |
| FB | 3 | Páidín O'Hare (Kilkerley Emmets) |
| LCB | 4 | Liam O'Neill (Oliver Plunketts) |
| RHB | 5 | Paul Fitzpatrick (Oliver Plunketts) |
| CHB | 6 | Pat Taaffe (Glyde Rangers) |
| LHB | 7 | Gerry Gorham (St Joseph's) |
| MF | 8 | Jimmy Kirk (Cooley Kickhams) |
| MF | 9 | Willie Kirk (Cooley Kickhams) |
| RHF | 10 | Niall O'Dowd (Oliver Plunketts) |
| CHF | 11 | Frank Taaffe (Oliver Plunketts) |
| LHF | 12 | Mickey Lynch (Newtown Blues) (c) |
| RCF | 13 | Declan Keegan (Wolfe Tones) |
| FF | 14 | Seán Ross (St Mary's) |
| LCF | 15 | Anthony Hoey (St Bride's) |
Substitutes:
| | 16 | Kevin Thornton (Cooley Kickhams) for Gorham |
| | 17 | Joe O'Donoghue (Oliver Plunketts) for Hoey |

=== Ulster Minor Football Championship ===
Quarter-Final

| 1971; Quarter-Final | Armagh | 1-06 – 5-08 | Down | St. Mary's Park, Castleblaney |

Semi-Final

| 1971; Semi-Final | Cavan | 2-11 – 0-09 | Down | Pearse Park, Ballybay |

Final

| 25 July 1971; Final | Tyrone | 0-19 – 0-07 | Fermanagh | Casement Park, Belfast |

=== All-Ireland Minor Football Championship ===
Semi-Finals

| 8 August 1971 Semi-Final | Mayo | 3-08 - 0-13 | Tyrone | Croke Park, Dublin |

| 22 August 1971 Semi-Final | Cork | 2-13 - 1-10 | Dublin | Croke Park, Dublin |
| | | | | Referee: S. Martin (Roscommon) |

Final

| 26 September 1971 Final | Mayo | 2-15 - 2-07 | Cork | Croke Park, Dublin |
