= Denny Long =

Irish Gaelic footballer

Personal information
- Native name: Donncha Ó Longáin (Irish)
- Born: 1949 (age 76–77) Cullen, County Cork, Ireland
- Occupation: Electrician
- Height: 6 ft 0 in (183 cm)

Sport
- Sport: Gaelic football
- Position: Midfield
Clubs
- Years: Club
- Cullen; Millstreet; Austin Stacks
Club titles
- Kerry titles: 3
- Munster titles: 1
- All-Ireland Titles: 1
Inter-county
Years	County	Apps (scores)
1969-1977	Cork	18 (0-26)
Inter-county titles
- Munster titles: 3
- All-Irelands: 1
- NFL: 0
- All Stars: 2

Denis Long (born 1949) is an Irish former Gaelic footballer. At club level, he played with Cullen, Millstreet and Austin Stacks, and at inter-county level with the Cork senior football team.

== Career ==
Long first played Gaelic football at club level with Cullen. He was still eligible for the minor grade when he won a Duhallow JFC medal with the club in 1967. Long subsequently transferred to the Millstreet club and won a Kelleher Shield title in 1971. He joined the Austin Stacks club after moving to Tralee in 1975. Long was part of the Stacks team that beat Ballerin by 1–13 to 2–07 to win the All-Ireland Club SFC title in 1977.

At inter-county level, Long first played for Cork as part of the minor team that beat Laois to win the All-Ireland MFC title in 1967. He progressed to the under-21 team and won consecutive Munster U21FC medals before winning an All-Ireland U21FC medal in 1970, in what was his last game in the grade.

By that stage, Long had already made his first appearance for the senior team. He won the first of three Munster SFC medals in four years in 1971. Long lined out as midfield partner to Denis Coughlan when Cork beat Galway by 3–17 to 2–13 in the 1973 All-Ireland SFC final. He ended the year by winning the first of two All Stars. During a carnival at Banteer in 1973, Long refereed a ladies' Gaelic football match between Kerry and Cork. This was one of the earliest ladies' Gaelic football inter-county games in Munster.

Long's performances at inter-county level resulted in his inclusion on the Munster inter-provincial team at various times between 1971 and 1977. He won three consecutive Railway Cup medals between 1975 and 1977, after respective defeats of Ulster, Leinster and Connacht.

== Personal life ==
Long moved to Tralee in 1975 and ran a general electrical business until his retirement in 2007. His son, Darragh Long, played for and managed Austin Stacks, as well as playing minor and under-21 football with Kerry.

== Honours ==
Cullen

- Duhallow Junior Football Championship (1): 1967

Millstreet

- Kelleher Shield (1): 1971

Austin Stacks

- All-Ireland Senior Club Football Championship (1): 1977
- Munster Senior Club Football Championship (1): 1976
- Kerry Senior Football Championship (3): 1975, 1976, 1979

Cork

- All-Ireland Senior Football Championship (1): 1973
- Munster Senior Football Championship (3): 1971, 1973, 1974;
- All-Ireland Under-21 Football Championship (1) 1970
- Munster Under-21 Football Championship (2) 1969, 1970
- All-Ireland Minor Football Championship (1) 1967
- Munster Minor Football Championship (1) 1967

Munster

- Railway Cup (3): 1975, 1976, 1977
