= Donal Hunt =

Irish Gaelic footballer

Personal information
- Native name: Dónall Ó Fiaich (Irish)
- Born: February 1949 (age 77) Bere Island, County Cork, Ireland
- Occupation: Company director
- Height: 5 ft 11 in (180 cm)

Sport
- Sport: Gaelic football
- Position: Midfield
Clubs
- Years: Club
- Bantry Blues → Carbery
Club titles
- Cork titles: 2
Inter-county
Years	County	Apps (scores)
1967-1978	Cork	17 (3-10)
Inter-county titles
- Munster titles: 3
- All-Irelands: 1
- NFL: 0
- All Stars: 0

Donal Hunt (born February 1949) is an Irish retired Gaelic footballer who played for club side Bantry Blues, divisional side Carbery and at inter-county level with the Cork senior football team.

== Career ==
Born on Bere Island, Hunt later came to prominence during his schooldays at Bantry Vocational School before later lining out with the Bantry Blues club. He won the first of three divisional championship titles in 1968, before later claiming county titles in junior and intermediate. He completed the county set of medals by winning County Senior Championship titles with Carbery in 1968 and 1971. By this stage Hunt had already made an impression on the inter-county scene with Cork and was the holder of All-Ireland medals in minor and under-21. He was added to the Cork senior football team in the autumn of 1967 and won three Munster Championship medals over the course of the following decade. Injury ruled Hunt out of a starting berth on the Cork team that faced Galway in the 1973 All-Ireland final, however, he claimed a winners' medal after coming on as a substitute. He also captained Munster to the Railway Cup title in 1972.

== Honours ==
Bantry Blues

- Cork Intermediate Football Championship: 1975
- Cork Junior Football Championship: 1972
- South West Junior A Football Championship: 1968, 1969, 1972

Carbery

- Cork Senior Football Championship: 1968, 1971

Cork

- All-Ireland Senior Football Championship: 1973
- Munster Senior Football Championship: 1971, 1973, 1974
- All-Ireland Under-21 Football Championship: 1970
- Munster Under-21 Football Championship: 1969, 1970
- All-Ireland Minor Football Championship: 1967
- Munster Minor Football Championship: 1966, 1967

Munster

- Railway Cup: 1972 (c)

Sporting positions
Preceded by Dan Dineen	Cork Senior Football Captain; 1969	Succeeded by Pat O'Doherty
Preceded by Mick Scannell	Cork Senior Football Captain; 1972	Succeeded by Billy Morgan
Achievements
Preceded by Mal McAfee	Railway Cup Football Final winning captain 1972	Succeeded by Brendan Lynch
