= Noel Murphy (Gaelic footballer) =

Irish Gaelic footballer

Personal information
- Native name: Nollaig Ó Murchú (Irish)
- Born: 1952 (age 73–74) Bishopstown, Cork, Ireland
- Height: 5 ft 11 in (180 cm)

Sport
- Sport: Gaelic football
- Position: Goalkeeper
Club
- Years: Club
- Bishopstown
Club titles
- Cork titles: 0
College
- Years: College
- University College Cork
College titles
- Sigerson titles: 1
Inter-county
Years	County	Apps (scores)
1973-1974	Cork	0 (0-00)
Inter-county titles
- Munster titles: 2
- All-Irelands: 1
- NFL: 0
- All Stars: 0

Noel Murphy (born 1952) is an Irish retired Gaelic footballer who played for Cork Championship club Bishopstown. He was a member of the Cork senior football team for two seasons, during which time he usually lined out as a goalkeeper.

At inter-county level, Murphy was part of the successful Cork junior team that won the All-Ireland Championship in 1972. He joined the Cork senior team during the 1972-73 National League and served as understudy to regular goalkeeper Billy Morgan for two seasons. During that time Murphy was sub-goalkeeper on Cork's 1973 All-Ireland Championship-winning team. He also secured two Munster Championship medals.

== Honours ==
University College Cork

- Sigerson Cup (1): 1972
- Munster Senior Club Football Championship (1): 1971

Bishopstown

- Cork Intermediate Football Championship (1): 1974

Cork

- All-Ireland Senior Football Championship (1): 1973
- Munster Senior Football Championship (2): 1973, 1974
- All-Ireland Junior Football Championship (1): 1972
- Munster Junior Football Championship (1): 1972
