= Grange GAA =

Irish athletic club

Grange
- An Grainseach
- County: Cork
- Colours: Yellow and white

Playing kits
Standard colours

Senior Club Championships
	All Ireland	Munster champions	Cork champions
Football:	0	0	0

Grange GAA is a Gaelic Athletic Association club located near Fermoy, County Cork, Ireland. The club is almost exclusively concerned with the game of Gaelic football and plays in the Avondhu division of Cork GAA.

== Honours ==
- Cork Junior Football Championship (1): 1979
- Cork Junior B Football Championship (1) 2019
- Cork Junior C Football Championship (1) 2026
- North Cork Junior A Football Championship (5): 1964, 1966, 1970, 1977, 1979
- North Cork Junior B Football Championship (2): 2016,2017
- North Cork Junior B Division 3 Football League (1): 2011
- North Cork Junior B Division 2 Football League (1): 2018

== Notable players ==
- Ned Kirby - Cork senior footballer - All Ireland winning player with Cork in 1973
- Damien O'Hagan
