= Mick Scannell =

Irish Gaelic footballer

Personal information
- Native name: Mícheál Ó Scannail (Irish)
- Born: 1949 (age 76–77) Ballyvourney, County Cork, Ireland
- Height: 5 ft 10 in (178 cm)

Sport
- Sport: Gaelic football
- Position: Full-back
Clubs
- Years: Club
- Naomh Abán; Muskerry
Club titles
- Cork titles: 1
Inter-county*
Years	County	Apps (scores)
1969-1973	Cork	5 (0-00)
Inter-county titles
- Munster titles: 2
- All-Irelands: 1
- NFL: 0
- All Stars: 0
- *Inter County team apps and scores correct as of 19:53, 20 December 2016.

Michael Scannell (born 1949) is an Irish retired Gaelic footballer. His league and championship career with the Cork senior team spanned five seasons from 1969 to 1973.

Born in Ballyvourney, County Cork Scannell first played competitive Gaelic football in his youth. He first appeared for the Naomh Abán club at underage levels, winning a host of divisional minor and under-21 championship medals. Scannell subsequently won county junior championship and county intermediate championship medals. As a member of the Muskerry divisional team, he won a county senior championship medal in 1970.

Scannell made his debut on the inter-county scene when he was selected on the Cork minor team in 1967. He enjoyed one championship season with the minors won an All-Ireland medal as a non-playing substitute in 1967. Scannell subsequently joined the Cork under-21 team, an All-Ireland medal in 1970. By this stage he had also joined the Cork senior team, becoming a member of the extended panel during the 1969 championship. Over the course of the next five seasons, Scannell won one All-Ireland in 1973 as a non playing substitute. He also won two Munster medals. Scannell played his last game for Cork in September 1973.

Scannell lined out with the Munster inter-provincial team for one season in 1972. He won a Railway Cup medal that year.

== Honours ==
Naomh Abán

- Cork Intermediate Football Championship (1): 1977
- Cork Junior Football Championship (1): 1973

Muskerry

- Cork Senior Football Championship (1): 1970

Cork

- All-Ireland Senior Football Championship (1): 1973
- Munster Senior Football Championship (2): 1971 (c), 1973
- All-Ireland Under-21 Football Championship (1): 1970
- Munster Under-21 Football Championship (2): 1969, 1970
- All-Ireland Minor Football Championship (1): 1967
- Munster Minor Football Championship (1): 1967

Munster

- Railway Cup (1): 1972

Sporting positions
Preceded by Pat O'Doherty	Cork Senior Football Captain; 1971	Succeeded by Donal Hunt
