= John Tobin (Gaelic footballer) =

Galway Gaelic footballer and manager

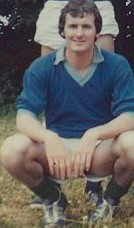
- Tobin in 1975

Personal information
- Native name: Seán Ó Tóibín (Irish)
- Born: 1952 (age 73–74) Tuam, County Galway, Ireland
- Occupation: Retired secondary school teacher

Sport
- Sport: Gaelic football
- Position: Left corner-forward
Club
- Years: Club
- Tuam Stars
Club titles
- Galway titles: 1
Inter-county*
Years	County	Apps (scores)
1971–1983	Galway	16 (5-59)
Inter-county titles
- Connacht titles: 5
- All-Irelands: 0
- NFL: 0
- All Stars: 1
- *Inter County team apps and scores correct as of 17:54, 23 October 2016.

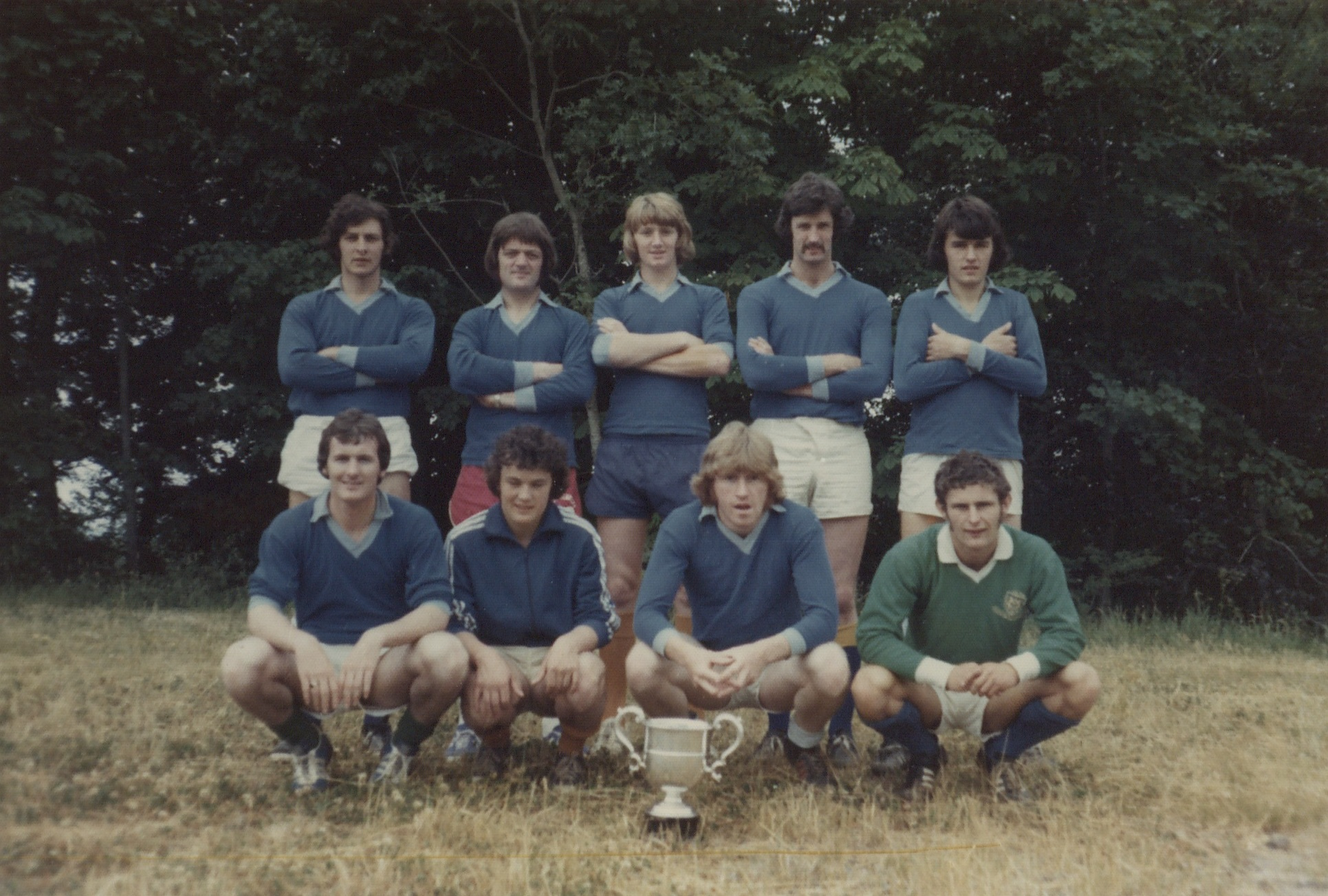
Tobin in 1975 (front row, far left)

John Tobin (born 1952) is an Irish former Gaelic football manager and player. His league and championship career at senior level with the Galway county team spanned twelve seasons from 1971 until 1983. Tobin served as manager of the team from 1989 until 1993 before taking charge of Roscommon from 2000 to 2001.

== Honours ==
=== Player ===
Tuam Stars

- Galway Senior Football Championship (1): 1984

Galway

- Connacht Senior Football Championship (5): 1973, 1974, 1976, 1982, 1983
- All-Ireland Minor Football Championship (1): 1970
- Connacht Minor Football Championship (1): 1970
- All-Ireland Under-21 Football Championship (1): 1972
- Connacht Under-21 Football Championship (1): 1972

Individual

- All Star Football Award (1): 1974

=== Manager ===
Roscommon

- Connacht Senior Football Championship (1): 2001
