= Noel Murphy (hurler) =

Irish hurler

Personal information
- Native name: Nollaig Ó Murchú (Irish)
- Born: 1936 Thurles, County Tipperary, Ireland
- Died: December 1997 (aged 61) Thurles, County Tipperary, Ireland

Sport
- Sport: Hurling
- Position: Left wing-back
Club
- Years: Club
- Thurles Sarsfields
Inter-county
- Years: County
- 1958-1962: Tipperary
Inter-county titles
- Munster titles: 3
- All-Irelands: 2

Noel Murphy (born 1931) was an Irish hurler who played for Tipperary Senior Championship club Thurles Sarsfields. He played for the Tipperary senior hurling team for a number of seasons, during which time he usually lined out as a wing-back.

== Honours ==
Tipperary

- All-Ireland Senior Hurling Championship (2): 1958, 1962
- Munster Senior Hurling Championship (3): 1958, 1960, 1962
