= 1979 Cork Junior Football Championship =

- Teams: 8
- Champions: Grange (1st title)
- Runners-up: Knocknagree

The 1979 Cork Junior Football Championship was the 81st staging of the Cork Junior Football Championship since its establishment by Cork County Board in 1895.

The final was played between Grange and Knocknagree, in what was their first ever meeting in the final. Grange won the match by 0–14 to 2–04 to claim their first ever championship title.

== Results ==
=== Final ===
Final	Grange	0–14 – 2–04	Knocknagree
