= 1971 Cork Senior Football Championship =

- Dates: 18 April – 10 October 1971
- Teams: 17
- Champions: Carbery (3rd title); Noel Crowley (captain)
- Runners-up: University College Cork; Jim Coughlan (captain)

Tournament statistics
- Matches played: 16
- Goals scored: 56 (3.5 per match)
- Points scored: 300 (18.75 per match)
- Top scorer(s): Brendan Lynch (2-17)

The 1971 Cork Senior Football Championship was the 83rd staging of the Cork Senior Football Championship since its establishment by the Cork County Board in 1887. The draw for the opening round fixtures took place at the Cork Convention on 31 January 1971. The championship ran from 18 April to 10 October 1971.

Muskerry entered the championship as the defending champions, however, they were beaten by Carbery in the quarter-finals.

The final was played on 10 October 1971 at the Athletic Grounds in Cork between Carbery and University College Cork in what was their second ever meeting in the final and the first in seven years. Carbery won the match by 3-11 to 2-08 to claim their second championship title overall and a first title in three years.

University College Cork's Brendan Lynch was the championship's top scorer with 2-17.

== Results ==
=== First round ===
23 April 1971 First round	St. Finbarr's	3-15 - 1-04	Na Piarsaigh	Cork Athletic Grounds, Cork
	E Fitzpatrick 0-8, P McMahon 2-0, M Archer 1-0, C McCarthy 0-2, M Fleming 0-2, G McCarthy 0-1, F Twomey 0-1, C Cullinane 0-1.		T Nott 1-3, J O'Sullivan 0-1.

=== Second round ===
18 April 1971 Second round	Beara	5-12 - 0-09	Imokilly	Sam Maguire Park, Dunmanway
	C O'Sullivan 2-0, EJ O'Sullivan 1-3, JJ Murphy 1-2, N O'Sullivan 1-1, KJ O'Sullivan 0-3, B O'Neill 0-2, N O'Reilly 0-1 (own point).		S O'Connor 0-6, E Ryan 0-1, M Cronin 0-1, J Barry 0-1.

18 April 1971 Second round	Seandún	0-10 - 2-07	Millstreet	Castle Ground, Macroom
	B Meade 0-7.		J Kenneally 1-4.

2 May 1971 Second round	Avondhu	0-08 - 4-10	Carbery	Cork Athletic Grounds, Cork
	P Lonergan 0-4, E Kirby 0-3, T Monaghan 0-1.		T Murphy 1-7, D Barron 1-1, B Evans 1-1, T Holland 1-0, D Hunt 0-1.

2 May 1971 Second round	St. Finbarr's	2-06 - 2-14	University College Cork	Cork Athletic Grounds, Cork
	E Fitzpatrick 1-4, F Twomey 1-1, M Fleming 0-1.		P Lynch 1-2, B Lynch 0-5, D Kavanagh 1-1, D Coffey 0-4, T Looney 0-2.

2 May 1971 Second round	Duhallow	1-06 - 4-12	Nemo Rangers	Bishop Casey Memorial Park, Mallow
	DJ O'Keeffe 0-5, PJ Cremin 1-1.		J Barrett 2-2, B Cogan 2-1, M O'Donoghue 0-4, C Murphy 0-3, F Cogan 0-1, D Allen 0-1.

2 May 1971 Second round	Macroom	0-05 - 4-11	Muskerry	Cloughduv GAA Grounds, Cloughduv
	T O'Sullivan 0-2, L Quinlan 0-2, H Casey 0-1.		F Cooper 3-1, N Dunne 0-7, C Twomey 1-0, M Mehigan 0-2, C Kelly 0-1.	Referee: F Halbert (Glenville)

9 May 1971 Second round	Carrigdhoun	0-06 - 4-11	Clonakilty	Kinsale Sportsfield, Kinsale
	C Cooney 0-3, J Hurley 0-1, J Foster 0-1, Hanley 0-1.		TF Hayes 0-11, F Hayes 2-0, J Donovan 1-0, D McCarthy 1-0.	Referee: P Finnegan (Cork)

26 May 1971 Second round	St. Nicholas'	2-11 - 1-11	St Michael's	Cork Athletic Grounds, Cork
	T O'Brien 0-8, P Harte 1-1, D Moore 1-1, D Coughlan 0-1.		N O'Keeffe 1-4, R Cummins 0-4, J Horgan 0-1, F O'Connell 0-1, D McCarthy 0-1.	Referee: F Halbert (Glenville)

=== Quarter-finals ===
30 May 1971 Quarter-final	Beara	2-14 - 3-06	Clonakilty	Wolfe Tone Park, Bantry
	C O'Sullivan 1-3, B Hanley 0-6, M O'Driscoll 1-1, KJ O'Sullivan 0-1, JL O'Sullivan 0-1, JJ Murphy 0-1, B O'Neill 0-1.		TF Hayes 1-3, F Hayes 1-0, Ted Hayes 1-0, D McCarthy 0-2, N Lane 0-1.	Referee: T Finnegan

27 June 1971 Quarter-final	Carbery	1-09 - 1-07	Muskerry	Clonakilty Sportsfield, Clonakilty
	T Holland 1-4, T Murphy 0-3, J Gabriel 0-1, B Evans 0-1.		M Buckley 0-4, S McCarthy 1-0, J McCarthy 0-3.	Referee: F Halbert (Glenville)

27 June 1971 Quarter-final	University College Cork	2-10 - 1-10	Millstreet	Coachford Sportsfield, Coachford
	B Lynch 1-3, D Coffey 1-1, P Lynch 0-3, D Murray 0-2, T Mahon 0-1.		S Kenneally 1-6, T Burke 0-2, T Dennehy 0-1, D Long 0-1.

21 July 1971 Quarter-final	Nemo Rangers	0-09 - 1-03	St. Nicholas'	Cork Athletic Grounds, Cork
	C Murphy 0-4, S Buckley 0-2, J Barrett 0-2, M O'Donoghue 0-1.		T O'Brien 1-3.

=== Semi-finals ===
25 July 1971 Semi-final	University College Cork	3-12 - 0-11	Beara	Rossa Park, Skibbereen
	B Lynch 1-5, D Lynch 0-5, D Kavanagh 1-0, E Crowley 1-0, P Lynch 0-1, T Looney 0-1.		C O'Sullivan 0-5, N O'Sullivan 0-2, E O'Sullivan 0-2, S O'Sullivan 0-1, JJ Murphy 0-1.

8 August 1971 Semi-final	Carbery	2-09 - 0-13	Nemo Rangers	Kinsale Sportsfield, Kinsale
	T Holland 0-7, D Hunt 1-1, B Desmond 1-0, D Barron 0-1.		C Murphy 0-4, J Barrett 0-3, B Cogan 0-3, M O'Donoghue 0-2, D Barrett 0-1.	Referee: F Halbert

=== Final ===
10 October 1971 Final	Carbery	3-11 - 2-08	University College Cork	Cork Athletic Grounds, Cork
	D Barron 2-0, J Carroll 1-1, D Hunt 0-4, T Holland 0-3, F Murphy 0-2, B Evans 0-1.		D Coffey 1-1, B Lynch 0-4, D Kavanagh 1-0, P Lynch 0-2, N O'Sullivan 0-1.	Referee: J Dennigan (Fermoy)

== Championship statistics ==
=== Top scorers ===
Overall

Rank	Player	Club	Tally	Total	Matches	Average
1	Brendan Lynch	UCC	2-17	23	4	5.75
2	Teddy Holland	Carbery	2-14	20	4	5.00
3	Con O'Sullivan	Beara	3-08	17	3	5.66
3	Tim F. Hayes	Clonakilty	1-14	17	2	8.50
5	Jim Kenneally	Millstreet	2-10	16	2	8.00
6	Éamonn Fitzpatrick	St. Finbarr's	1-12	15	2	7.50
7	Teddy O'Brien	St. Nicholas'	1-11	14	2	7.00
8	Jimmy Barrett	Nemo Rangers	2-07	13	3	4.33
8	Tony Murphy	Carbery	1-10	13	4	3.25
10	Denis Coffey	UCC	2-06	12	4	3.00
10	Declan Barron	Carbery	3-02	11	4	2.75
10	Paudie Lynch	UCC	1-08	11	4	2.75
10	Colm Murphy	Nemo Rangers	0-11	11	3	3.66
