= 1972 All-Ireland Under-21 Football Championship =

Gaelic football competition

Championship details

All-Ireland Champions
- Winning team: Galway (1st win)
- Captain: Joe Waldron

All-Ireland Finalists
- Losing team: Kerry

Provincial Champions
- Munster: Kerry
- Leinster: Kildare
- Ulster: Tyrone
- Connacht: Galway

The 1972 All-Ireland Under-21 Football Championship was the ninth staging of the All-Ireland Under-21 Football Championship since its establishment by the Gaelic Athletic Association in 1964.

Cork entered the championship as defending champions, however, they were defeated by Kerry in the Munster final.

On 22 October 1972, Galway won the championship following a 2-6 to 0-7 defeat of Kerry in the All-Ireland final. This was their first All-Ireland title.

== Results ==
=== All-Ireland Under-21 Football Championship ===
Semi-finals

27 August 1972 Semi-final	Galway	4-05 - 1-09	Tyrone	Pearse Stadium, Galway

2 September 1972 Semi-final	Kildare	0-06 - 0-13	Kerry	St. Conleth's Park, Newbridge

Final

22 October 1972 Final	Galway	2-06 - 0-07	Kerry	Croke Park, Dublin

== Statistics ==
=== Miscellaneous ===
- Tyrone win the Ulster title for the first time in their history.
