= Declan Barron =

Irish Gaelic footballer

Personal information
- Native name: Déaglán Barún (Irish)
- Nickname: Deccie
- Born: 1951 (age 74–75) Bantry, County Cork, Ireland
- Occupation: Oil refinery employee
- Height: 6 ft 0 in (183 cm)

Sport
- Sport: Gaelic football
- Position: Centre-forward
Clubs
Years	Club	Apps (scores)
1968-1985 1970-1975	Bantry Blues → Carbery	29 (8-35); 19 (15-10)
Club titles
- Cork titles: 1
Inter-county*
Years	County	Apps (scores)
1971-1982	Cork	23 (5-23)
Inter-county titles
- Munster titles: 3
- All-Irelands: 1
- NFL: 1
- All Stars: 2
- *Inter County team apps and scores correct as of 18:14, 28 May 2018.

Declan Barron (born 1951) is an Irish former Gaelic football player who played for club side Bantry Blues, divisional side Carbery and at inter-county level with the Cork senior football team. He usually lined out at midfield or in the forwards.

== Career ==
Barron, whose father had played with the Carlow senior football team, first played Gaelic football at Bantry National school and from there he moved to play at club level with Bantry Blues. He won the first of four divisional championship titles in 1968, before later claiming county titles in junior and intermediate. He completed the county set of medals by winning a County Senior Championship title with Carbery in 1971.

By this stage Barron had already made an impression on the inter-county scene with Cork and was the holder of two All-Ireland minor championship medals and two All-Ireland under-21 championship medals. He was added to the Cork senior team in 1971 and won the first of three Munster Championship medals that year. Barron was at centre-forward when Cork claimed the All-Ireland title after a defeat of Galway in the final. He continued to line out with Cork for much of the following decade and ended his career by winning a National League medal. Having won two All-Star awards during his playing days, Barron was later named on the Cork Football Teams of the Century and Millennium.

== Honours ==
Bantry Blues

- Cork Intermediate Football Championship: 1975
- Cork Junior Football Championship: 1972
- South West Junior A Football Championship: 1968, 1969, 1972, 1985

Carbery

- Cork Senior Football Championship: 1971

Cork

- All-Ireland Senior Football Championship: 1973
- Munster Senior Football Championship: 1971, 1973, 1974
- National Football League: 1979–80
- All-Ireland Under-21 Football Championship: 1970, 1971
- Munster Under-21 Football Championship: 1970, 1971
- All-Ireland Minor Football Championship: 1968, 1969
- Munster Minor Football Championship: 1968, 1969

Munster

- Railway Cup:1975
