= Johnny Hughes =

Galway Gaelic footballer

Johnny Huges
Personal information
- Native name: Seán Ó hAodha (Irish)
- Born: 1950 (age 75–76) Mountbellew, County Galway, Ireland
- Occupation: Area sales manager

Sport
- Sport: Gaelic football
- Position: Left wing-back
Club
- Years: Club
- Mountbellew–Moylough
Club titles
- Galway titles: 1
Inter-county
- Years: County
- 1973–1983: Galway
Inter-county titles
- Connacht titles: 5
- All-Irelands: 0
- NFL: 1
- All Stars: 2

John "Johnny" Hughes (born 1950) is an Irish former Gaelic footballer who played as a left wing-back at senior level for the Galway county team.

Born in Mountbellew, County Galway, Hughes served his Gaelic football apprenticeship with the local club, moving upwards through the grades. An injury prevented him from appearing for the Galway minor team; however, he later spent three years with the under-21 side. He made his senior debut in various tournament games in 1973. Hughes played a key role in defence over the next decade, and won five Connacht medals, one National Football League medal and two All-Star awards.

Hughes represented the Connacht inter-provincial team on a number of occasions and was a Railway Cup runner-up on two occasions. At club level he won one championship medal with Mountbellew–Moylough.

Hughes effectively retired from inter-county football after the 1983 championship, while his club football career ended several years later.
