= Tony Murphy (Gaelic footballer) =

Irish Gaelic footballer

Personal information
- Native name: Antaine Ó Murchú (Irish)
- Born: 4 July 1950 Rosscarbery, County Cork, Ireland
- Died: 13 October 2004 (aged 54) Rosscarbery, County Cork, Ireland
- Occupation: County council employee

Sport
- Sport: Gaelic football
- Position: Left wing-forward
Clubs
- Years: Club
- Carbery Rangers → Carbery
Club titles
- Cork titles: 2
Inter-county
Years	County	Apps (scores)
1971-1975	Cork	2 (0-09)
Inter-county titles
- Munster titles: 0
- All-Irelands: 0
- NFL: 0
- All Stars: 0

Anthony Murphy (4 July 1950 – 13 October 2004) was an Irish Gaelic football player, selector, and administrator. He played for club side Carbery Rangers, divisional side Carbery and at the inter-county level with the Cork senior football team.

== Career ==
Murphy first came to prominence as a member of the Carbery Rangers minor team that won three successive championships. His performances at the club level resulted in his inclusion on the Cork minor team that secured the All-Ireland title in 1968. Murphy progressed onto the Cork under-21 team and enjoyed three undefeated years at the provincial level before winning consecutive All-Ireland Under-21 Championships in 1970–71. By this stage, he had also been drafted onto the Cork senior team and made a number of appearances between 1971 and 1975. Murphy also won County Senior Championship titles with Carbery in 1968 and 1971 before ending his career with a number of divisional championship titles with Carbery Rangers. In retirement from playing he became involved in coaching, and was a selector with the Carbery Rangers team that won the County Junior Championship title in 2003.

== Honours ==
=== Player ===
Carbery Rangers

- South West Junior A Football Championship: 1980, 1984, 1987
- West Cork Minor B Football Championship: 1966, 1967, 1968

Carbery

- Cork Senior Football Championship: 1968, 1971

Cork

- All-Ireland Junior Football Championship: 1972
- Munster Junior Football Championship: 1972
- All-Ireland Under-21 Football Championship: 1970, 1971
- Munster Under-21 Football Championship: 1969, 1970, 1971
- All-Ireland Minor Football Championship: 1968
- Munster Minor Football Championship: 1968

=== Selector ===
Carbery Rangers

- Cork Junior A Football Championship: 2003
- South West Junior A Football Championship: 2003
