= 1970 All-Ireland Minor Football Championship =

Gaelic football competition

All-Ireland Minor Football Championship 1970
All-Ireland Champions
- Winning team: Galway (3rd win)
- Captain: Joe Corcoran

All-Ireland Finalists
- Losing team: Kerry
- Captain: Ger Power

Provincial Champions
- Munster: Kerry
- Leinster: Dublin
- Ulster: Derry
- Connacht: Galway

Championship statistics

The 1970 All-Ireland Minor Football Championship was the 39th staging of the All-Ireland Minor Football Championship, the Gaelic Athletic Association's premier inter-county Gaelic football tournament for boys under the age of 18.

Cork entered the championship as defending champions in search of a record-breaking fourth successive All-Ireland title, however, they were defeated by Kerry on a scoreline of 4–9 to 1–11 in the Munster final.

On 25 October 1970, Galway won the championship following a 1–11 to 1–10 defeat of Kerry in the All-Ireland final. This was their third All-Ireland title overall and their first in ten championship seasons.

== Results ==
=== Connacht Minor Football Championship ===
Quarter-final

1970 Quarter-final	Roscommon	0-08 – 0-04	Leitrim	Páirc Seán Mac Diarmada, Carrick-on-Shannon

Semi-finals

1970 Semi-final	Galway	4-12 – 2-06	Sligo	Fr O'Hara Park, Charlestown

1970 Semi-final	Roscommon	2-05 – 3-08	Mayo	Pearse Stadium, Galway

Final

12 July 1970 Final	Galway	2-11 – 1-6	Mayo	Pearse Stadium, Galway
				Referee: Paddy O'Connor (Roscommon)

=== Leinster Minor Football Championship ===
Quarter-finals

1970 Quarter-final	Laois	3-12 – 0-02	Westmeath	O'Connor Park, Tullamore

1970 Quarter-final	Dublin	3-12 – 0-02	Longford	Cusack Park, Mullingar

1970 Quarter-final	Wicklow	0-11 – 0-05	Kildare	Dr Cullen Park, Carlow

1970 Quarter-final replay	Wicklow	0-12 – 1-06	Kildare	Dr Cullen Park, Carlow

Semi-finals

1970 Semi-final	Meath	0-12 – 1-06	Kildare	Páirc Tailteann, Navan

1970 Semi-final	Offaly	1-05 – 3-09	Dublin	Cusack Park, Mullingar

Final

19 July 1970 Final	Meath	0-13 – 2-08	Dublin	Croke Park, Dublin

=== Ulster Minor Football Championship ===
Quarter-finals

1970 Quarter-final	Tyrone	5-13 – 1-03	Monaghan	Dean McGlinchey Park, Irvinestown

1970 Quarter-final	Donegal	1-08 – 0-04	Cavan	Bundoran

Semi-final

1970 Semi-final	Derry	2-11 – 0-06	Tyrone	MacCumhaill Park, Ballybofey

Final

26 July 1970 Final	Derry	1-14 – 0-11	Fermanagh	St. Tiernach's Park, Clones

=== Munster Minor Football Championship ===
Quarter-final

1970 Quarter-final	Limerick	4-09 – 0-06	Waterford	Fraher Field, Dungarvan

Semi-finals

5 July 1970 Semi-final	Cork	4-14 – 0-04	Tipperary	Ned Hall Park, Clonmel

5 July 1970 Semi-final	Kerry	2-10 – 0-04	Limerick	Páirc na nGael, Askeaton

Final

26 July 1970 Final	Kerry	4-09 – 1-11	Cork	Fitzgerald Stadium, Killarney

=== All-Ireland Minor Football Championship ===
Semi-finals

9 August 1970 Semi-final	Galway	3-12 - 0-10	Dublin	Croke Park, Dublin
	J Tobin 2-8, M Burke 1-1, M Rooney 0-2, I Barrett 0-1.		P Hickey 0-3, PJ Reid 0-2, D Clarke 0-2, P Byrne 0-2, S McCarthy 0-1.	Referee: P Greene (Antrim)

23 August 1970 Semi-final	Kerry	2-10 - 0-11	Derry	Croke Park, Dublin
	PB Brosnan 1-2, J Murphy 0-5, G Power 1-0, P Lynch 0-2, G O'Keeffe 0-1.		S Mullan 0-5, M O'Neill 0-2, B Kelly 0-2, P Lennon 0-1, E Laverty 0-1.	Referee: M Connaughton (Mayo)

Finals

27 September 1970 Final	Galway	1-08 - 2-05	Kerry	Croke Park, Dublin
	S Tobin 0-5, I Barrett 1-1, M Rooney 0-2.		G O'Keeffe 1-0, C O'Connell 1-0, J Murphy 0-2, M O'Sullivan 0-1, P Lynch 0-1, J Long 0-1.	Referee: L Maguire (Monaghan)

25 October 1970 Final replay	Galway	1-11 - 1-10	Kerry	Croke Park, Dublin
	J Lardner 1-3, J Tobin 0-3, M Walsh 0-2, M Rooney 0-2, P Silke 0-1.		J Long 0-6, G Power 1-1, D Moore 0-2, J Egan 0-1.	Referee: P Greene (Antrim)

== Championship statistics ==
=== Miscellaneous ===
- The All-Ireland final ends in a draw and goes to a replay for the first time in its history.
