= 1974 All-Ireland Senior Football Championship =

Football championship

Championship details
- Dates: 19 May – 22 September 1974
- Teams: 32

All-Ireland Champions
- Winning team: Dublin (18 win)
- Captain: Seán Doherty
- Manager: Kevin Heffernan

All-Ireland Finalists
- Losing team: Galway
- Captain: Gay Mitchell
- Manager: John "Tull" Dunne

Provincial Champions
- Munster: Cork
- Leinster: Dublin
- Ulster: Donegal
- Connacht: Galway

Championship statistics
- No. matches played: 32
- Top Scorer: Jimmy Keaveney (1–36)
- Player of the Year: Kevin Heffernan

The 1974 All-Ireland Senior Football Championship was the 88th staging of the All-Ireland Senior Football Championship, the Gaelic Athletic Association's premier inter-county Gaelic football tournament. The championship began on 19 May 1974 and ended on 22 September 1974.

Cork were the defending champions, however, they were defeated by Dublin in the All-Ireland semi-final.

On 22 September 1974, Dublin won the championship following a 0–14 to 1–6 defeat of Galway in the All-Ireland final. This was their 18th All-Ireland title, their first in eleven championship seasons.

Dublin's Jimmy Keaveney was the championship's top scorer with 1–36. Dublin manager Kevin Heffernan was the choice for Texaco Footballer of the Year, the first time that the award went to a manager instead of a player.

== Team summaries ==
Team	Colours	Stadium	Most recent success		
Team	Colours	Stadium	All-Ireland	Provincial	National League
Antrim	Saffron and white	Casement Park		1951	
Armagh	Orange and white	Athletic Grounds		1953	
Carlow	Red, green and gold	Dr. Cullen Park		1944	
Cavan	Royal blue and white	Breffni Park	1952	1969	1947–48
Clare	Yellow and blue	Cusack Park		1917	
Cork	Red and white	Cork Athletic Grounds	1973	1973	1955–56
Derry	White and red	Celtic Park		1970	1946–47
Donegal	Gold and green	MacCumhaill Park		1972	
Down	Red and black	Páirc Esler	1968	1971	1967–68
Dublin	Sky blue and navy	Parnell Park	1963	1965	1957–58
Fermanagh	Green and white	Brewster Park			
Galway	Maroon and white	Pearse Stadium	1966	1973	1964–65
Kerry	Green and gold	Fitzgerald Stadium	1970	1972	1973–74
Kildare	White	Páirc Tailteann	1928	1956	
Kilkenny	Black and amber	Nowlan Park		1911	
Laois	Blue and white	O'Moore Park		1946	1925–26
Leitrim	Green and gold	Páirc Seán Mac Diarmada		1927	
Limerick	Green and white	Gaelic Grounds	1896	1896	
London	Green and white	Emerald GAA Grounds			
Longford	Royal blue and gold	Pearse Park		1968	1965–66
Louth	Red and white	Drogheda Park	1957	1957	
Mayo	Green and red	MacHale Park	1951	1969	1969–70
Meath	Green and gold	Páirc Tailteann	1967	1970	1950–51
Monaghan	White and blue	St. Tiernach's Park		1938	
Offaly	Green, white and gold	O'Connor Park	1972	1973	
Roscommon	Primrose and blue	Dr. Hyde Park	1944	1972	
Sligo	Black and white	Markievicz Park		1928	
Tipperary	Blue and gold	Semple Stadium	1920	1935	
Tyrone	White and red	Healy Park		1973	
Waterford	White and blue	Fraher Field		1898	
Westmeath	Maroon and white	Cusack Park			
Wexford	Purple and gold	Wexford Park	1918	1945	
Wicklow	Blue and gold	Pearse Park			

== Results ==
=== Connacht Senior Football Championship ===
Quarter-final

9 June 1974 Quarter-final	Leitrim	1–6 – 3–12	Sligo	Páirc Seán Mac Diarmada, Carrick-on-Shannon
	B Wrynne 0–4, S Kavanagh 1–0, T Mulvey 0–1, B Burns 0–1.		M Laffey 2–4, P Henry 1–1, M Kearins 0–3, T Colleary 0–1, H Quinn 0–1, J Kearins 0–1, J Stenson 0–1.

Semi-finals

16 June 1974 Semi-final	Galway	3–11 – 0–13	Mayo	Tuam Stadium, Tuam
	J Tobin 0–5, P Sands 1–1, J Duggan 1–1, C McDonagh 1–0, T Naughton 0–2, L O'Neill 0–1, J Burke 0–1.		T O'Malley 0–4, M Higgins 0–2, S O'Grady 0–2, JP Keane 0–1, W McGee 0–1, T Webb 0–1, MT Higgins 0–1, J Gibbons 0–1.	Attendance: 20,000; Referee: J Martin (Roscommon)

23 June 1974 Semi-final	Sligo	1–11 – 2–8	Roscommon	Markievicz Park, Sligo
	M Kearins 0–9, J Kearins 1–0, F Henry 0–2.		J Finnegan 1–4, D Earley 1–2, M Freyne 0–1, J O'Gara 0–1.	Referee: M Loftus (Mayo)

7 July 1974 Semi-final replay	Roscommon	0–13 – 0–8	Sligo	Dr. Hyde Park, Roscommon
	D Early 0–7, J O'Graa 0–2, M McNamara 0–1, M Freyne 0–1, J Kelly 0–1, J Kerrane 0–1.		M Kearins 0–7, J Kearins 0–1.	Referee: M Loftus (Mayo)

Final

14 July 1974 Final	Galway	2–14 – 0–8	Roscommon	Pearse Stadium, Galway
	J Tobin 0–9, L Sammon 2–0, J Duggan 0–2, M Hughes 0–1, T Naughton 0–1, W Joyce 0–1.		D Earley 0–3, M Frayne 0–3, D Watson 0–1, J Kelly 0–1.	Attendance: 25,000; Referee: M Loftus (Mayo)

=== Leinster Senior Football Championship ===
First round

19 May 1974 First round	Carlow	3–7 – 3–14	Louth	Dr. Cullen Park, Carlow
	W Cullen 2–1, T Geoghegan 1–1, B McNally 0–2, D Byrne 0–2, C Hughes 0–1.		D Reid 0–8, S Mulroy 1–1, M McKeown 1–1, R Brennan 1–0, B Gaughran 0–2, E Sheelan 0–1, J McLoughlin 0–1.	Referee: M Meally (Kilkenny)

26 May 1974 First round	Dublin	3–9 – 0–6	Wexford	Croke Park, Dublin
	R Doyle 2–1, T Hanahoe 1–1, S Rooney 0–3, D Hickey 0–2, A O'Toole 0–2.		D Grennell 0–2, D O'Brien 0–2, M Quigley 0–1, J O'Shaughnessy 0–1.	Referee: R Barry (Meath)

Second round

2 June 1974 Second round	Dublin	2–11 – 1–9	Louth	Páirc Tailteann, Navan
	J Keaveney 0–6, D Hickey 1–2, B Mullins 1–0, A O'Toole 0–3.		D Reid 0–4, G Grehan 1–0, S Mulroy 0–1, E Sheelin 0–1, P Gallagher 0–1, B Gaughran 0–1, M McKeown 0–1.	Attendance: 7,000; Referee: P Collins (Westmeath)

Quarter-finals

9 June 1974 Quarter-final	Laois	3–6 – 0–2	Wicklow	O'Moore Park, Portlaoise
	S Delaney 2–0, E Condron 0–5, S Fleming 0–1.		H Mulhaire 1–0 og, P Clarke 0–1, J Doyle 0–1.	Referee: M Meally (Kilkenny)

9 June 1974 Quarter-final	Meath	3–8 – 0–7	Westmeath	Croke Park, Dublin
	G Farrelly 1–2, K Rennicks 1–1, P Cromwell 1–1, M Fay 0–1, M Kerrigan 0–1, D Murtagh 0–1, P McManus 0–1.		D Smyth 0–2, M Carley 0–2, R Keoghan 0–1, M Ryan 0–1, V Murray 0–1.	Referee: P Kelly (Dublin)

16 June 1974 Quarter-final	Kildare	2–10 – 0–11	Longford	Pearse Park, Longford
	R O'Sullivan 1–2, M Moore 1–0, J Donnelly 0–3, P Dunny 0–2, P Mangan 0–1, P Kelly 0–1, B O'Doherty 0–1.		S Kilroy 0–6, B Smyth 0–2, H McGovern 0–1, TP Cashell 0–1, J Flynn 0–1.	Referee: P Collins (Westmeath)

16 June 1974 Quarter-final	Dublin	1–11 – 0–13	Offaly	Croke Park, Dublin
	J Keaveney 0–5, L Deegan 1–1, T O'Toole 0–1, S Rooney 0–1, B Mullins 0–1, T Hanahoe 0–1, D Hickey 0–1.		T McTague 0–7, K Kilmurray 0–2, M Connor 0–1, S Draby 0–1, M Wright 0–1, W Bryan 0–1.	Referee: M Meally (Kilkenny)

Semi-finals

30 June 1974 Semi-final	Meath	1–14 – 0–7	Laois	Croke Park, Dublin
	G Farrelly 1–4, P Cromwell 0–4, M Fay 0–2, M Kerigan 0–2, C Roe 0–1, K Rennicks 0–1.		R Miller 0–5, S Delaney 0–1, H Mulhaire 0–1.	Referee: P Kelly (Dublin)

14 July 1974 Semi-final	Dublin	1–13 – 0–10	Kildare	Croke Park, Dublin
	J Keaveney 0–5, B Mullins 1–0, P Gogarty 0–3, A O'Toole 0–2, R Doyle 0–1, D Hickey 0–1, G Wilson 0–1.		J Donnelly 0–3, P Dunny 0–2, R O'Sullivan 0–1, M Moore 0–1, P Carew 0–1, B O'Doherty 0–1, P Swords 0–1.	Referee: P Collins (Westmeath)

Final

28 July 1974 Final	Dublin	1–14 – 1–9	Meath	Croke Park, Dublin
	J Keaveney 1–8, A O'Toole 0–3, D Hickey 0–2, S Rooney 0–1.		M Fay 1–1, O O'Brien 0–3, K Rennicks 0–2, M Kerrigan 0–2, G Farrelly 0–1.	Attendance: 37,067; Referee: P Collins (Westmeath)

=== Munster Senior Football Championship ===
Quarter-finals

26 May 1974 Quarter-final	Clare	1–4 – 1–9	Tipperary	Gaelic Grounds, Limerick
	J O'Halloran 1–1, S Moloney 0–1, P Dillon 0–1, M Keogh 0–1.		L Myles 0–4, S McCarthy 1–0, J Cummins 0–2, S Kearney 0–1, J White 0–1, S Conway 0–1.	Referee: B Cross (Limerick)

2 June 1974 Quarter-final	Waterford	1–11 – 0–5	Limerick	Fraher Field, Dungarvan
	V Kirwan 0–6, M Hackett 1–0, P Morrissey 0–2, S Aherne 0–1, J Hennessy 0–1, P McMahon 0–1.		P Aherne 0–3, C Crean 0–1, D Burke 0–1.	Referee: J Dennigan (Cork)

Semi-finals

9 June 1974 Semi-final	Cork	3–14 – 2–2	Tipperary	Páirc Mac Gearailt, Fermoy
	R Cummins 1–4, D Barron 1–1, D McCarthy 1–1, D Long 0–3, D Coughlan 0–3, N Kirby 0–2.		L Myles 1–0, S Kearney 1–0, J White 0–1, J Cummins 0–1.	Referee: B Cross (Limerick)

16 June 1974 Semi-final	Kerry	7–16 – 0–8	Waterford	Fitzgerald Stadium, Killarney
	S Fitzgerald 2–3, M Sheehy 2–3, J Egan 2–0, M O'Sullivan 1–3, E O'Donoghue 0–2, J O'Keeffe 0–2, B Lynch 0–1, G Power 0–1, J Long 0–1.		M Hackett 0–3, T Casey 0–1, J Hennessy 0–1, L Slevin 0–1, V Kirwan 0–1, P Morrissey 0–1.	Referee: F Halberg (Cork)

Final

14 July 1974 Final	Kerry	0–7 – 1–11	Cork	Fitzgerald Stadium, Killarney
	Mickey O'Sullivan 0–4, Paudie Lynch, Éamonn O'Donoghue, Mikey Sheehy 0–1 each		Ray Cummins 0–4 (0-2f), Dave McCarthy 1–0, Jimmy Barry-Murphy 0–3, Jimmy Barrett 0–2, Ned Kirby and Declan Barron 0–1 each	Attendance: 49,822; Referee: Brendan Cross (Limerick)

=== Ulster Senior Football Championship ===
Preliminary round

9 June 1974 Preliminary round	Down	1–10 – 0–6	Armagh	Páirc Esler, Newry
	M Cunningham 1–2, P Rooney 0–5, K Smith 0–2, S O'Neill 0–1.		J Smith 0–2, P Loughrea 0–1, E O'Neill 0–1, S O'Hagan 0–1, T McCaughley 0–1.	Referee: H McPoland (Antrim)

Quarter-finals

2 June 1974 Quarter-final	Antrim	2–7 – 1–8	Fermanagh	Casement Park, Belfast
	A McCallin 2–0, V Magee 0–2, G McCann 0–2, A Hamill 0–2, G Armstrong 0–1.		P McGinnitty 1–2, F Sherry 0–2, A Tunny 0–2, T Gallagher 0–1, E McPartland 0–1.	Referee: B Trainor (Down)

9 June 1974 Quarter-final	Derry	3–6 – 0–8	Monaghan	Dean McGlinchey Park, Ballinascreen
	G O'Loughlin 1–2, M Moran 1–0, A McGuirk 1–0, H Niblock 0–1, T Quinn 0–1, P Stephenson 0–1, L Diamond 0–1.		P Donnelly 0–3, B McDonald 0–2, P Kerr 0–1, G Fitzpatrick 0–1, K Trainor 0–1.	Referee: G Fagan (Armagh)

16 June 1974 Quarter-final	Tyrone	0–8 – 1–9	Donegal	Healy Park, Omagh
	A McMahon 0–2, S Coyle 0–2, P Hetherington 0–2, M Harte 0–1, P King 0–1.		K Keeney 1–0, S Granaghan 0–3, N Gallagher 0–3, M Carney 0–2, J Winston 0–1.	Attendance: 15,000; Referee: H Reilly (Louth)

23 June 1974 Quarter-final	Down	2–8 – 0–12	Cavan	Breffni Park, Cavan
	W Walsh 1–0, C McAlarney 1–0, P McGrath 0–3, S O'Neill 0–2, C Ward 0–1, D Gordon 0–1, P Rooney 0–1.		P Kelly 0–4, H McInerney 0–3, S Duggan 0–2, M Goldrick 0–2, C O'Keeffe 0–1.	Referee: S Murray (Monaghan)

Semi-finals

7 July 1974 Semi-final	Donegal	5–9 – 1–7	Antrim	St. Tiernach's Park, Clones
	S Bonner 4–1, P McGettigan 1–0, N Gallagher 0–3, H McClafferty 0–2, M Carney 0–2, S Granaghan 0–1.		P McCallin 0–4, PJ O'Hara 1–0, V Magee 0–1, G Armstrong 0–1, A Hamill 0–1.	Attendance: 2,000; Referee: P Tierney (Cavan)

14 July 1974 Semi-final	Down	1–12 – 0–7	Derry	The Playing Fields, Lurgan
	S O'Neill 1–3, P Rooney 0–3, P McGrath 0–3, Walsh 0–2, M Cunningham 0–1.		F O'Loone 0–5, G O'Loughlin 0–1, P Doherty 0–1.	Attendance: 6,000; Referee: P Devlin (Tyrone)

Finals

28 July 1974 Final	Donegal	1–14 – 2–11	Down	St. Tiernach's Park, Clones
	S Bonner 1–2, N Gallagher 0–3, J Winston 0–3, M Carney 0–2, S Grannaghan 0–1, H McClafferty 0–1, M Carr 0–1, B McEniff 0–1.		P Rooney 1–4, C Ward 1–2, S O'Neill 0–3, M Cunningham 0–2.	Referee: P Devlin (Tyrone)

4 August 1974 Final replay	Donegal	3–9 – 1–12	Down	St. Tiernach's Park, Clones
	S Bonner 2–0, N Gallagher 0–4, K Keeney 1–0, M Lafferty 0–2, M Carr 0–1, P McGhettigan 0–1, S Granaghan 0–1.		S O'Neill 1–0, W Walsh 0–3, C Ward 0–3, C McAlarney 0–3, M Cunningham 0–2, P Rooney 0–1.	Attendance: 25,000; Referee: P Devlin (Tyrone)

=== All-Ireland Senior Football Championship ===
Semi-finals

11 August 1974 Semi-final	Dublin	2–11 – 1–8	Cork	Croke Park, Dublin
	B Mullins 1–1, J Keaveney 0–4, A O'Toole 1–0, J McCarthy 0–2, R Doyle 0–2, S Rooney 0–1, T Hanahoe 0–1.		J Barry-Murphy 1–2, R Cummins 0–4, J Barrett 0–1, D Long 0–1.	Attendance: 42,190; Referee: P Devlin (Tyrone)

18 August 1974 Semi-final	Galway	3–13 – 1–14	Donegal	Croke Park, Dublin
	J Tobin 2–6, C McDonagh 1–1, L Sammon 0–3, T Naughton 0–2, W Joyce 0–1.		N Gallagher 0–8, S Bonner 1–0, S Granaghan 0–2, PJ McGowen 0–1, H Clafferty 0–1, A Gallagher 0–1, M Lafferty 0–1.	Attendance: 33,782; Referee: P Collins (Westmeath)

Final

22 September 1974 Final	Dublin	0–14 – 1–6	Galway	Croke Park, Dublin
	J Keaveney 0–8, B Mullins 0–2, D Hickey 0–2, A O'Toole 0–1, J McCarthy 0–1.		M Rooney 1–1, T Naughton 0–2, J Duggan 0–1, J Tobin 0–1, J Hughes 0–1.	Attendance: 71,898; Referee: P Devlin (Tyrone)

== Championship statistics ==
=== Miscellaneous ===
- Dublin win the Leinster title for the first time since 1965.
- The All-Ireland semi-finals between Donegal and Galway was the very first championship meeting between the two sides, while the other was the first meeting between Dublin and Cork since the All Ireland final of 1907.
- Dublin win the All-Ireland title for the first time since 1963.

=== Top scorers ===
Overall

Rank	Player	County	Tally	Total	Matches	Average
1	Jimmy Keaveney	Dublin	1–36	39	6	6.50
2	Seamus Bonner	Donegal	8–3	27	5	5.40
2	John Tobin	Galway	2–21	27	4	6.75
4	Noel Gallagher	Donegal	0–21	21	5	4.20
5	Mickey Kearns	Sligo	0–19	19	3	6.33
6	Seán O'Neill	Down	2–9	15	5	3.00
6	Dermot Earley	Roscommon	1–12	15	3	5.00
6	Ray Cummins	Cork	1–12	15	3	5.00
9	Gerry Farrelly	Meath	2–7	13	3	4.33
9	Brian Mullins	Dublin	3–4	13	5	2.60

Single game

Rank	Player	County	Tally	Total	Opposition
1	Seamus Bonner	Donegal	4–1	13	Antrim
2	John Tobin	Galway	2–6	12	Donegal
3	John Tobin	Dublin	1–8	11	Meath
4	Michael Laffey	Sligo	2–4	10	Leitrim
5	Séamus Mac Gearailt	Kerry	2–3	9	Waterford
5	Mikey Sheehy	Kerry	2–3	9	Waterford
5	Mickey Kearns	Sligo	0–9	9	Roscommon
5	John Tobin	Galway	0–9	9	Roscommon
9	Damien Reid	Louth	0–8	8	Carlow
9	Noel Gallagher	Donegal	0–8	8	Galway
9	Jimmy Keaveney	Dublin	0–8	8	Galway
