= Jimmy Barrett (Gaelic footballer) =

Irish Gaelic footballer

Personal information
- Native name: Séamus de Bairéid (Irish)
- Born: 1949 (age 76–77) Cork, Ireland
- Height: 5 ft 11 in (180 cm)

Sport
- Sport: Gaelic football
- Position: Forward
Club
Years	Club	Apps (scores)
1967-1981	Nemo Rangers	71 (25-89)
Club titles
- Cork titles: 5
- Munster titles: 4
- All-Ireland Titles: 2
Inter-county
Years	County	Apps (scores)
1970-1978	Cork	17 (5-18)
Inter-county titles
- Munster titles: 3
- All-Irelands: 1

Jimmy Barrett (born 1949 in Cork, Ireland) is a former Irish sportsperson. He played Gaelic football with his local club Nemo Rangers and was a member of the Cork senior inter-county team from 1970 until 1978.

== Playing career ==
=== Club ===
Barrett played his club football with the famous Nemo Rangers club and enjoyed much success. He lined out in his first senior county championship final in 1970, however, Muskerry defeated Nemo in their first final appearance. Two years later Barrett captured that elusive county winners' medal when Nemo Rangers defeated UCC. Nemo's march to success continued later in the year as the club captured the Munster club title before Barrett lined out in the All-Ireland final. St. Vincent's of Dublin provided the opposition, however, a late Jimmy Keaveney point forced a draw and a replay. First-half goals in the replay by Barrett and Billy Cogan were followed by two more Liam Goode and Séamus Coughlan goals in the second-half. The final score of 4–6 to 0-10 gave Barrett a first All-Ireland club winners' medal.

Two years later in 1974 Barrett added a second county championship winners' medal to his collection. A second Munster club title quickly followed, before Nemo booked their place in another All-Ireland final. UCD provided the opposition on that occasion, however, Barrett's side were defeated by 1–11 to 0–12. 1975 saw Barrett capture a third county title. A third Munster club winners' medal soon followed, however, Nemo were trounced in the subsequent All-Ireland semi-final.

After surrendering their county title in 1976, Nemo were back the following year with Barrett picking up a fourth county winners' medal. A fifth county championship of the decade followed in 1978 before Barrett collected a fourth Munster club title. The subsequent All-Ireland final pitted Nemo against Scotstown of Monaghan. Snow hampered the game, however, Frank Cogan proved the hero as Nemo won the game by 2–9 to 1–3. It was his second All-Ireland club winners' medal.

=== Inter-county ===
Barrett first came to prominence on the inter-county scene as a member of the Cork minor football team in the early 1960s. He won a Munster title in this grade in 1967, following a 2–8 to 0-3 thrashing of Kerry. Cork later qualified for the All-Ireland final where Laois provided the opposition. An easy 5–14 to 2–3 win gave Barrett an All-Ireland minor winners' medal.

In the same year Barrett secured a rare dual All Ireland Minor success in both codes in the same year after lining out at midfield for Cork Minor hurlers, defeating Wexford 2–15 to 5–3 to win the All-Ireland final.

Barrett later moved onto the Cork under-21 team where he enjoyed some further success. He won a Munster title in this grade in 1970, before later lining out in the All-Ireland final. A convincing 2–11 to 0–9 defeat of Fermanagh gave Barrett an All-Ireland winners' medal in the under-21 grade.

By the late 1960s Barrett had joined the Cork senior team, however, they had to play second fiddle to Kerry. In 1971 Cork were back. A 0–25 to 0-14 trouncing of back-to-back All-Ireland champions Kerry gave Barrett a Munster winners' medal. Cork, however, were later defeated by eventual champions Offaly in the All-Ireland semi-final.

Two years later Barrett secured his second Munster winners' medal. The 5–12 to 1–15 defeat of arch-rivals Kerry showed the traditional football powers that Cork were coming. The subsequent All-Ireland final pitted Cork against Galway. Teenager Jimmy Barry-Murphy scored the first of his two goals after just two minutes before scored a third for Cork after switching to left wing-forward. At full-time Cork were the champions by 3–17 to 2–13. This victory gave Barrett an All-Ireland winners' medal.

Cork continued their provincial dominance in 1974. A 1–11 to 0–7 defeat of Kerry gave Barrett a third Munster winners' medal. This victory resulted in Cork being installed as the favourites to retain their All-Ireland title. An air of overconfidence crept into the side as Barrett's side were defeated by eventual champions Dublin in the All-Ireland semi-final.

=== Inter-provincial ===
Barrett also lined out with Munster in the inter-provincial football competition. He first played with his province in 1970, however, success was slow in coming. Barrett was dropped from the team completely in 1971, however, he was back in 1972. That year Munster defeated Leinster in a replay, giving him a Railway Cup winners' medal. Three years later in 1975 Barrett captured a second Railway Cup title following a high-scoring victory over Ulster.

== Honours ==
=== Nemo Rangers ===
- All-Ireland Senior Club Football Championship:
  - Winner (2): 1973, 1979
  - Runner-up (1): 1975
- Munster Senior Club Football Championship:
  - Winner (4): 1972, 1974, 1975, 1978
  - Runner-up (1): 1977
- Cork Senior Football Championship:
  - Winner (5): 1972, 1974, 1975, 1977, 1978
  - Runner-up (1): 1970

=== Cork ===
- All-Ireland Senior Football Championship:
  - Winner (1): 1973
- Munster Senior Football Championship:
  - Winner (3): 1971, 1973, 1974
  - Runner-up (3): 1969, 1970, 1972

== Sources ==
- Corry, Eoghan, The GAA Book of Lists (Hodder Headline Ireland, 2005).
- Cronin, Jim, A Rebel Hundred: Cork's 100 All-Ireland Titles.
- Donegan, Des, The Complete Handbook of Gaelic Games (DBA Publications Limited, 2005).
