= 1973 All-Ireland Senior Football Championship =

Football championship

Championship details
- Dates: 13 May – 23 September 1973
- Teams: 31

All-Ireland Champions
- Winning team: Cork (4th win)
- Captain: Billy Morgan
- Manager: Donie O'Donovan

All-Ireland Finalists
- Losing team: Galway
- Captain: Liam Sammon
- Manager: John "Tull" Dunne

Provincial Champions
- Munster: Cork
- Leinster: Offaly
- Ulster: Tyrone
- Connacht: Galway

Championship statistics
- No. matches played: 31
- Top Scorer: Tony McTague (1–25)
- Player of the Year: Billy Morgan

The 1973 All-Ireland Football Championship was the 87th staging of the All-Ireland Senior Football Championship, the Gaelic Athletic Association's premier inter-county Gaelic football tournament. The championship began on 13 May 1973 and ended on 23 September 1973.

Offaly were the defending champions but were defeated by Galway in the All-Ireland semi-final.

On 23 September 1973, Cork won the championship following a 3–17 to 2–13 defeat of Galway in the All-Ireland final. This was their 4th All-Ireland title, their first in 28 championship seasons.

Offaly's Tony McTague was the championship's top scorer with 1–25. Cork's Billy Morgan was the choice for Texaco Footballer of the Year.

== Results ==
=== Connacht Senior Football Championship ===
Quarter-final

10 June 1973 Quarter-final	Galway	3–6 – 1–9	Sligo	Tuam Stadium, Tuam
	M Rooney 1–1, J Coughlan 1–1, L Sammon 1–0, J Tobin 0–3, M Burke 0–1.		M Kearins 0–5, PJ Brennan 1–0, D Pugh 0–2, J Stenson 0–1, P Kearins 0–1.	Attendance: 15,000; Referee: P Devlin (Tyrone)

Semi-finals

17 June 1973 Semi-final	Leitrim	0–3 – 7–6	Mayo	Páirc Seán Mac Diarmada, Carrick-on-Shannon
	B Wrynne 0–2, S Flanagan 0–1.		W McGee 3–0, T O'Malley 2–2, J Gibbons 1–1, M Gannon 1–0, S Gilbride 0–2, J Morley 0–1.	Referee: J Lee (Sligo)

24 June 1973 Semi-final	Roscommon	1–8 – 1–13	Galway	Dr. Hyde Park, Roscommon
	M Freyne 1–2, T Heneghan 0–4, J O'Gara 0–1, J Kelly 0–1.		J Tobin 0–5, J Caughlan 1–1, L Sammon 0–4, W Joyce 0–1, L O'Neill 0–1, J Duggan 0–1.	Referee: P Devlin (Tyrone)

Final

8 July 1973 Final	Mayo	2–12 – 1–17	Galway	MacHale Park, Castlebar
	S Gilbride 0–5, J Morley 1–0, M Gannon 1–0, J Corcoran 0–3, T O'Malley 0–2, F Burns 0–1, W McGee 0–1,		M Rooney 1–2, J Tobin 0–5, M Burke 0–3, T Naughten 0–3, L Sammon 0–2, J Caughlan 0–2.	Attendance: 30,000; Referee: P Devlin (Tyrone)

=== Leinster Senior Football Championship ===
First round

13 May 1973 First round	Louth	0–14 – 1–3	Carlow	Drogheda Park, Drogheda
	S Mulroy 0–4, D Reid 0–4, J McLoughlin 0–1, E Sheelan 0–1, A Hoey 0–2, R Brennan 0–1, B Gaughran 0–1.		P Connolly 1–0, B McNally 0–1, JJ Canavan 0–1, B Hughes 0–1.	Attendance: 3,000; Referee: R Barry (Meath)

20 May 1973 First round	Dublin	3–11 – 0–5	Wexford	Wexford Park, Wexford
	F Murray 2–1, G Wilson 1–1, S Rooney 0–4, J Keaveney 0–2, R Doyle 0–2, A Larkin 0–1.		D Noonan 0–2, D Asple 0–1, G Howlin 0–1, M Quigley 0–1.	Attendance: 2,000; Referee: B Hayden (Carlow)

Second round

27 May 1973 Second round	Louth	1–9 – 2–6	Dublin	Páirc Tailteann, Navan
	A Hoey 1–1, S Mulroy 0–3, B Faulkner 0–2, D Reid 0–2, R Brennan 0–1.		F Murray 1–1, P O'Brien 1–1, S Rooney 0–3, R Doyle 0–1.	Referee: P Cullen (Westmeath)

10 June 1973 Second round replay	Louth	1–8 – 0–9	Dublin	Páirc Tailteann, Navan
	D Reid 0–6, E Sheelan 1–0, R Brennan 0–1, L Leech 0–1.		R Doyle 0–4, D Hickey 0–2, S Rooney 0–1, E Brady 0–1, F Murray 0–1.	Attendance: 12,000; Referee: P Collins (Westmeath)

Quarter-finals

3 June 1973 Quarter-final	Westmeath	0–8 – 1–6	Meath	Cusack Park, Mullingar
	M Carley 0–4, D Murtagh 0–2, L Eggerton 0–1, V Murray 0–1.		M Kerrigan 1–0, T Brennan 0–3, B Murray 0–2, P Cromwell 0–1.	Referee: G Hoey (Louth)

3 June 1973 Quarter-final	Wicklow	0–14 – 3–15	Laois	Aughrim Park, Aughrim
	P Clarke 0–9, A Norton 0–1, L O'Loughlin 0–1, B Carthy 0–1, J Darcy 0–1, J Doyle 0–1.		B Miller 0–5, Willie Brennan 0–5, S Allen 1–1, H Mulhaire 1–1, B Lalor 1–0, M Buggy 0–2, J Lalor 0–1.	Referee: B Hayden (Carlow)

10 June 1973 Quarter-final	Kildare	0–13 – 0–8	Longford	Geraldine Park, Athy
	J Donnelly 0–7, P Dunny 0–2, R O'Doherty 0–2, T Carew 0–1, R Flanagan 0–1,		J Hanniffy 0–3, P Bradley 0–2, F Farrell 0–1, B Smyth 0–1, S Mulvihill 0–1.	Referee: P Kelly (Dublin)

17 June 1973 Quarter-final	Offaly	1–8 – 0–8	Louth	Croke Park, Dublin
	W Bryan 1–0, T McTague 0–3, S Cooney 0–1, M Wright 0–1, J Smith 0–1, P Fleming 0–1, K Kilmurray 0–1.		J McLoughlin 0–2, D Reid 0–2, R Barry 0–2, S Mulroy 0–1, D Nugent 0–1.	Referee: R Barry (Meath)

Semi-finals

17 June 1973 Semi-final	Meath	2–17 – 2–11	Laois	Croke Park, Dublin
	O O'Brien 1–4, Matt Kerrigan 1–2, T Brennan 0–3, O Geraghty 0–2, K Rennicks 0–2, P Cromwell 0–2, G Farrelly 0–1, B Murray 0–1.		W Brennan 0–5, M Fennell 1–1, S Allen 1–0, M Buggy 0–2, J Lawlor 0–2, B Lawlor 0–1.	Referee: P Kelly (Dublin)

1 July 1973 Semi-final	Offaly	1–15 – 2–6	Kildare	Croke Park, Dublin
	T McTague 0–8, S Cooney 1–4, K Kilmurray 0–2, S Evans 0–1.		T Carew 1–0, K Kelly 1–0, P Dunny 0–2, J Donnelly 0–2, B O'Doherty 0–1, H Hyland 0–1.	Referee: B Hayden (Carlow)

Final

22 July 1973 Final	Offaly	3–21 – 2–12	Meath	Croke Park, Dublin
	Tony McTague 0–11 (0-8f), Sean Cooney 2–2, Kevin Kilmurray 1–2, Kieran Claffey 0–3, Willie Bryan 0–2, Paddy Fenning 0–1		Ollie O'Brien 1–4 (0-3f), Mick Fay 1–0, Ken Rennicks 0–3, Gerry Farrelly 0–2, Tony Brennan 0-2f, Ollie Geraghty 0–1.	Attendance: 35,990; Referee: Brendan Hayden (Carlow)

=== Munster Senior Football Championship ===
Quarter-finals

3 June 1973 Quarter-final	Clare	0–18 – 1–5	Waterford	Gaelic Grounds, Limerick
	M Keogh 0–6, B O'Reilly 0–4, M Greene 0–3, D Donnellan 0–2, S Maloney 0–2, K McGann 0–1.		J Flynn 1–2, V Kirwan 0–2, J Larkin 0–1.	Referee: T Woulfe (Limerick)

3 June 1973 Quarter-final	Limerick	1–7 – 4–13	Tipperary	Gaelic Grounds, Limerick
	T Fitzgibbon 1–0, P Aherne 0–7.		P Blythe 3–3, J Cummins 0–7, M Keating 1–1, C O'Flaherty 0–2.	Referee: N Dalton (Waterford)

Semi-finals

17 June 1973 Semi-final	Cork	2–14 – 0–3	Clare	Cork Athletic Grounds, Cork
	B Field 1–8, J Barrett 1–2, R Cummins 0–2, D Hunt 0–1, D Barron 0–1.		S Maloney 0–1, B O'Reilly 0–1, P Dillon 0–1.	Referee: S Maloney (Tipperary)

17 June 1973 Semi-final	Kerry	3–11 – 0–5	Tipperary	Austin Stack Park, Tralee
	M O'Dwyer 1–6, M O'Sullivan 2–1, J Egan 0–1, D Kavanagh 0–1, J O'Keeffe 0–1, B Lynch 0–1.		J Cummins 0–2, J Kehoe 0–2, C O'Flaherty 0–1.	Referee: F Halbert (Cork)

Final

15 July 1973 Final	Cork	5–12 – 1–15	Kerry	Cork Athletic Grounds, Cork
	Billy Field 1–6 (1–0 pen, 0-5f), Jimmy Barrett 2–2, Ray Cummins 0–4, Declan Barron and Jimmy Barry-Murphy 1–0 each		Mick O'Dwyer 0-6f, Donal Kavanagh 1–0, Brendan Lynch and John Egan 0–3 each, John O'Keeffe, Éamonn O'Donoghue, Jackie Walsh 0–1 each	Attendance: 28,859; Referee: J Moloney (Tipperary)

=== Ulster Senior Football Championship ===
Preliminary round

10 June 1973 Preliminary round	Down	2–10 – 2–9	Armagh	Páirc Esler, Newry
	S O'Neill 0–6, M Cole 1–1, C McAlarney 1–0, P Rooney 0–2, E Cole 0–1.		L Kerins 2–2, P Loughran 0–5, D Mackin 0–1, S O'Hagan 0–1.	Referee: H McPolin (Armagh)

Quarter-finals

3 June 1973 Quarter-final	Monaghan	0–5 – 1–7	Derry	St. Mary's Park, Castleblaney
	B Brady 0–2, P McCarthy 0–2, K Traynor 0–1.		F O'Loane 0–4, J O'Leary 1–0, G O'Loughlin 0–1, T McGuinness 0–1, F Moran 0–1.	Referee: P Devlin (Tyrone)

17 June 1973 Quarter-final	Fermanagh	3–9 – 4–4	Antrim	St. Molaise Park, Irvinestown
	E McPartlan 3–0, P McGannity 0–6, A Campbell 0–2, T Henderson 0–1.		G McCann 3–0, V Magee 1–0, P Armstrong 0–2, A McCallin 0–2.	Referee: P Tierney (Cavan)

24 June 1973 Quarter-final	Donegal	1–7 – 0–12	Tyrone	MacCumhaill Park, Ballybofey
	K Keeney 1–0, N Gallagher 0–2, J Winston 0–2, S Granaghan 0–1, T Quinn 0–1, F McFeeley 0–1.		P Hetherington 0–6, AR McMahon 0–2, S Donaghy 0–1, K Teague 0–1, B Donnelly 0–1, F McGulgan 0–1.	Referee: M McPolin (Antrim)

24 June 1973 Quarter-final	Down	1–7 – 0–8	Cavan	Páirc Esler, Newry
	S O'Neill 1–2, M Cole 0–2, C Davey 0–1, P Hamill 0–1, C McAlarney 0–1.		O O'Keeffe 0–2, M Greenan 0–2, H McInerney 0–2, JJ Martin 0–1, R Carolan 0–1.	Referee: T Johnston (Fermanagh)

Semi-finals

8 July 1973 Semi-final	Tyrone	1–15 – 0–11	Fermanagh	St. Tiernach's Park, Clones
	S Donaghy 1–2, P Hetherington 0–5, F McGuigan 0–3, A McMahon 0–2, J McElroy 0–1, P McMahon 0–1, P Haig 0–1.		F Sherry 0–5, F McGinnity 0–2, PJ Treacy 0–2, E McPartland 0–1, S McGrath 0–1.	Referee: A McPollan (Antrim)

15 July 1973 Semi-final	Down	1–12 – 0–9	Derry	The Playing Fields, Lurgan
	M Cole 0–5, E Cole 1–1, W Walsh 0–3, P Rooney 0–2, C McAlarney 0–1.		P Doherty 0–3, J O'Leary 0–2, T McGuinness 0–2, T Moran 0–1, S Donaghy 0–1.	Referee: P Devlin (Tyrone)

Final

29 July 1973 Final	Tyrone	3–13 – 1–11	Down	St. Tiernach's Park, Clones
	S McElhattion 2–1, P Hetherington 0–6, K Teague 1–1, B Donnelly 0–3, S Donaghy 0–1, P McGuigan 0–1.		S O'Neill 0–6, D McCartan 1–0, J Murphy 0–2, P Rooney 0–2, E Cole 0–1.	Referee: H McPolin (Antrim)

=== All-Ireland Senior Football Championship ===
Semi-finals

12 August 1973 Semi-final	Galway	0–16 – 2–8	Offaly	Croke Park, Dublin
	J Tobin 0–8, M Burke 0–2, L Sammon 0–2, M Rooney 0–1, M Hughes 0–1, T Naughton 0–1, J Duggan 0–1.		T McTague 1–3, S Evans 1–2, W Bryan 0–2, K Claffey 0–1.	Attendance: 36,705; Referee: J Moloney (Tipperary)

19 August 1973 Semi-final	Cork	5–10 – 2–4	Tyrone	Croke Park, Dublin
	D Barron 1–4, J Barry-Murphy 2–0, R Cummins 1–1, S Coughlan 1–1, J Barrett 0–2, D Long 0–1, E Kirby 0–1.		P King 1–0, J Early 1–0, K Teague 0–1, P Hetherington 0–1, S Donaghy 0–1, F McGuigan 0–1.	Attendance: 28,997; Referee: M Loftus (Mayo)

Final

23 September 1973 Final	Cork	3–17 – 2–13	Galway	Croke Park, Dublin
	R Cummins 0–8, J Barry-Murphy 2–1, J Barrett 1–2, D Long 0–3, E Kirby 0–1, D Coughlan 0–1, D Barron 0–1.		M Hughes 0–7, T Naughton 1–0, J Hughes 1–0, M Burke 0–2, J Duggan 0–2, TJ Gilmore 0–1, L Sammon 0–1.	Attendance: 73,309; Referee: J Moloney (Tipperary)

== Championship statistics ==
=== Miscellaneous ===
- Tyrone won their first Ulster title since 1957.
- Offaly win the Leinster title for the third year in succession. It is the first time in their history that they claim the coveted "three-in-a-row". It is the first time since Laois in 1938 that a team claimed three successive Leinster titles.
- The All Ireland semi-final between Cork and Tyrone was the first championship meeting between the teams.
- Cork end their second longest drought without the All Ireland title of 28 years.

=== Top scorers ===
Overall

Rank	Player	County	Tally	Total	Matches	Average
1	Tony McTague	Offaly	1–25	28	4	7.00
2	John Tobin	Galway	0–21	21	4	5.25
3	Billy Field	Cork	2–14	20	3	6.66
3	Jimmy Barrett	Cork	4–8	20	4	5.00
5	Patsy Hetherington	Tyrone	0–18	18	4	4.50
5	Ray Cummins	Cork	0–18	18	4	4.50
7	Seán O'Neill	Down	1–14	17	3	5.66
8	Mick O'Dwyer	Kerry	1–12	15	2	7.50
9	Jimmy Barry-Murphy	Cork	5–1	15	3	5.00
10	Damian Reid	Louth	0–14	14	4	3.50

Single game

Rank	Player	County	Tally	Total	Opposition
1	Billy Field	Cork	1–8	11	Clare
1	Tony McTague	Offaly	0–11	11	Meath
3	Willie McGee	Mayo	3–0	9	Meath
3	Éamonn McPartland	Fermanagh	3–0	9	Antrim
3	Gerry McCann	Antrim	3–0	9	Fermanagh
3	Mick O'Dwyer	Kerry	1–6	9	Tipperary
3	Billy Field	Cork	1–6	9	Kerry
8	Tommy O'Malley	Mayo	2–2	8	Antrim
8	John Cooney	Offaly	2–2	8	Meath
8	Jimmy Barrett	Cork	2–2	8	Kerry
8	Larry Kerins	Armagh	2–2	8	Down
8	Tony McTague	Offaly	0–8	8	Kildare
8	John Tobin	Galway	0–8	8	Offaly
8	Ray Cummins	Cork	0–8	8	Galway
