= 1971 All-Ireland Senior Football Championship final =

- Event: 1971 All-Ireland Senior Football Championship
Offaly	Galway
1–14 (17)	2–8 (14)
- Date: 26 September 1971
- Venue: Croke Park, Dublin
- Referee: P. Kelly (Dublin)
- Attendance: 70,789
- Weather: Rain

The 1971 All-Ireland Senior Football Championship final was the 84th All-Ireland Final and the deciding match of the 1971 All-Ireland Senior Football Championship, an inter-county Gaelic football tournament for the top teams in Ireland.

== Match ==
This year's final was played on 26 September.

=== Summary ===
Galway were appearing in their first final since the three-in-a-row side of the 1960s. Offaly, who had never won an All-Ireland title, had last contested a final in 1969.

Galway were favourites. However, a shock Murt Connor goal gave Offaly their first title. However, with the duration of certain championship matches increasing from 60 to 80 minutes during the 1970s before being settled at 70 minutes after five seasons of this in 1975, this is the only All-Ireland final whose score at 60 minutes was different (a draw) to the actual outcome.

This was the first All-Ireland final attended by Martin Breheny. The weather on the day was later described by Breheny as consisting of a "steady drizzle" in the first half, followed by a "deluge of monsoon proportions" during the second half.

It would be a further 21 years before another team (Donegal) won their first All-Ireland Senior Football Championship.

=== Details ===
Final	Offaly	1–14 – 2–8	Galway	Croke Park, Dublin; Attendance: 70,789; Referee: P. Kelly (Dublin)
Final	T McTague 0–6, M Connor 1–2, S Evans 0–2, K Kilmurray 0–2, B Clavin 0–1, J Cooney 0-1		S Leydon 2–3, F Canavan 0–3, L Sammon 0–2	Croke Park, Dublin; Attendance: 70,789; Referee: P. Kelly (Dublin)

Offaly
Galway

==== Offaly ====
- 1 M. Furlong
- 2 M. Ryan
- 3 P. McCormack
- 4 M. O'Rourke
- 5 E. Mulligan
- 6 N. Clavin
- 7 M. Heavey
- 8 W. Bryan (c)
- 9 K. Claffey
- 10 S. Cooney
- 11 K. Kilmurray
- 12 T. McTague
- 13 J. Gunning
- 14 S. Evans
- 15 M. Connor

Subs used
17 J. Smith for N. Clavin
18 P. Fenning for J. Gunning

Subs not used
16 N. Kinnarney
19 L. Hanlon
20 L. Coughlan
21 D. Murphy
22 S. Darby
23 G. Hughes
24 S. Lowry

Trainer
T. F. Gillooley

==== Galway ====
- 1 P. J. Smyth
- 2 B. Colleran
- 3 J. Cosgrove
- 4 N. Colleran
- 5 L. O'Neill
- 6 T. J. Gilmore
- 7 C. McDonagh
- 8 L. Sammon (c)
- 9 W. Joyce
- 10 F. Burke
- 11 J. Duggan
- 12 M. Rooney
- 13 E. Farrell
- 14 F. Canavan
- 15 S. Leydon

Subs used
19 T. Divilly for M. Rooney
17 M. Feerick for F. Burke

Subs not used
16 G. Mitchell
18 J. McLoughlin
20 G. King
21 M. Byrne
22 M. Keane
