= 1974 All-Ireland Senior Football Championship final =

- Event: 1974 All-Ireland Senior Football Championship
Dublin	Galway
0–14 (14)	1–6 (9)
- Date: 22 September 1974
- Venue: Croke Park, Dublin
- Referee: Paddy Devlin (Tyrone)
- Attendance: 71,898
- Weather: Dry

The 1974 All-Ireland Senior Football Championship final was the 87th All-Ireland Final and the deciding match of the 1974 All-Ireland Senior Football Championship, an inter-county Gaelic football tournament for the top teams in Ireland.

This was one of the 13 consecutive All-Ireland SFC finals contested by either Dublin or Kerry between 1974 and 1986, a period when one of either team always contested the decider.

== Match ==
This year's final was played on 22 September.

=== Summary ===
Galway led 1–4 to 0–5 at half-time, with a Michael Rooney goal. Paddy Cullen saved a penalty kick (placed 17th in RTÉ's 2005 series Top 20 GAA Moments) and Kevin Heffernan's Dublin staged a comeback to win by five points. The penalty save (Liam Sammon took it) occurred at the Canal End of Croke Park.

It was Galway's second consecutive appearance in an All-Ireland SFC final; they lost to Cork in 1973.

Paddy Devlin, who had previously taken charge of the 1972 replay, was the last Tyrone man to referee an All-Ireland SFC final until Sean Hurson took charge of the 2022 final.

=== Details ===
22 September 1974; Final	Dublin	0–14 – 1–6	Galway	Croke Park, Dublin; Attendance: 71,898; Referee: Paddy Devlin (Tyrone)
22 September 1974; Final	M Rooney 1–1, T Naughton 0–2, J Duggan 0–1, J Tobin 0–1, J Hughes 0–1		J Keaveney 0–8, B Mullins 0–2, D Hickey 0–2, A O'Toole 0–1, J McCarthy 0–1	Croke Park, Dublin; Attendance: 71,898; Referee: Paddy Devlin (Tyrone)

Dublin
Galway

Dublin

- 1 Paddy Cullen
- 2 Gay O'Driscoll
- 3 Seán Doherty (c)
- 4 Robbie Kelleher
- 5 Paddy Reilly
- 6 Alan Larkin
- 7 Georgie Wilson
- 8 Stephen Rooney
- 9 Brian Mullins
- 10 Booby Doyle
- 11 Tony Hanahoe
- 12 David Hickey
- 13 John McCarthy
- 14 Jimmy Keaveney
- 15 Anton O'Toole

Subs not used
16 Brendan Pocock
17 Bernard Donovan
18 Dave Billings
19 Kevin Synnott
20 Paddy Gogarty
21 Les Deegan
22 Pat O'Neill
23 Jim Brogan
24 Fran Ryder

Manager
Kevin Heffernan

Galway

- 1 Gay Mitchell (c)
- 2 Joe Waldron
- 3 Jack Cosgrove
- 4 Brendan Colleran
- 5 Liam O'Neill
- 6 T. J. Gilmore
- 7 Johnny Hughes
- 8 Willie Joyce
- 9 Michael Rooney
- 10 Tom Naughton
- 11 Jimmy Duggan
- 12 P. Sands
- 13 Colie McDonagh
- 14 Liam Sammon
- 15 John Tobin

Subs used
J. Burke for C. McDonagh

== Legacy ==
The players involved in the game organised a golden jubilee reunion in 2024.
