= Galway county football team =

Gaelic football team

Galway
- Sport: Football
- Irish: Gaillimh
- Nickname(s): The Tribesmen
- County board: Galway GAA
- Manager: Éamonn Fitzmaurice
- Captain: John Maher
- Home venue(s): Pearse Stadium, Salthill

Recent competitive record
- Current All-Ireland status: QF in 2026
- Last championship title: 2001
- Current NFL Division: 1 (5th in 2026)
- Last league title: 1981
First colours	Second colours

The Galway county football team (/ˈɡɔːlweɪ/ GAWL-way) represents Galway in men's Gaelic football and is governed by Galway GAA, the county board of the Gaelic Athletic Association. The team competes in the three major annual inter-county competitions; the All-Ireland Senior Football Championship, the Connacht Senior Football Championship and the National Football League.

Galway's home ground is Pearse Stadium, Salthill. The team's manager is Éamonn Fitzmaurice who previously managed Kerry.

Galway was the first Connacht county to win an All-Ireland Senior Football Championship (SFC). It has nine All-Ireland SFCs, the third highest total after Kerry and Dublin. It won three consecutive All-Ireland SFCs in the mid-1960s and, from 1998 onwards, two All-Ireland SFC titles in four years. The team last won the Connacht Senior Championship in 2025, the All-Ireland Senior Football Championship in 2001 and the National League in 1981.

== History ==
=== Early years ===
The first All-Ireland Senior Football Championship (SFC) took place in 1887. The tournament in that season was an open draw, while from 1887 until 1891, counties were represented by the club which had won the county championship. The Galway championship did not begin until the 1889 season however, meaning Galway had no county champions.

Galway was scheduled to play its first match in the All-Ireland SFC against Wexford in 1887, but the team did not play and Wexford advanced to the next round via a walkover. The following (1888) championship was supposed to provide an introduction of provincial championships, but Galway was the only team in Connacht at the time. The semi-finals (for which Galway would have qualified as Connacht representatives) did not take place in 1888 due to the season being cut short by a tour of the United States. Galway was also absent from the 1889 championship. As the only Connacht team Galway was given a bye to the 1890 All-Ireland SFC semi-final, and was (like in 1887) drawn against Wexford. But, like in 1887, Galway did not play their match, giving Wexford uncontested passage to that year's final.

Galway was not involved again in the All-Ireland SFC until the 1900 edition. 1900 brought the introduction of a revised All-Ireland SFC format. The four provincial championships would be played as per before, with the four winning teams playing in the "Home" championship, and the winner of the "Home" final advancing to play London in the All-Ireland SFC final. This was also the case for the 1901, 1902 and 1903 championships. Galway, as the only Connacht team, advanced to the semi-finals of the "Home" championship. But the game again did not occur, though this time Galway benefited as Antrim gave the team a bye. This led the odd circumstance of a Galway team reaching the "Home" final without playing a single match. In 1900, thirteen years after the first championship, Galway played in its first match of the competition, the final against Tipperary, losng the game by a scoreline of 2–17 to 0–1.

1901 was also the year in which the first Connacht Senior Football Championship (SFC) was held. Galway defeated Roscommon at the semi-final stage, but then lost to Mayo in the first Connacht SFC final. With the exception of 1902 and 1904, when Galway and Mayo respectively were unopposed, a Connacht SFC was staged each season after this, which, until 2001's introduction of a qualifier system, granted the winner an All-Ireland SFC semi-final berth.

Despite having represented the province by default on several occasions, it was not until 1911, that Galway earned the right to call itself full Connacht champions, when the team defeated Roscommon by a single point on a scoreline of 1–03 to 1–02. Galway lost to Cork in the All-Ireland SFC semi-final, by a scoreline of 3–4 to 0–2. Galway also won the Connacht SFC in 1913 and 1917, without winning either All-Ireland SFC semi-final.

=== 1919–1925: First All-Ireland SFC title ===
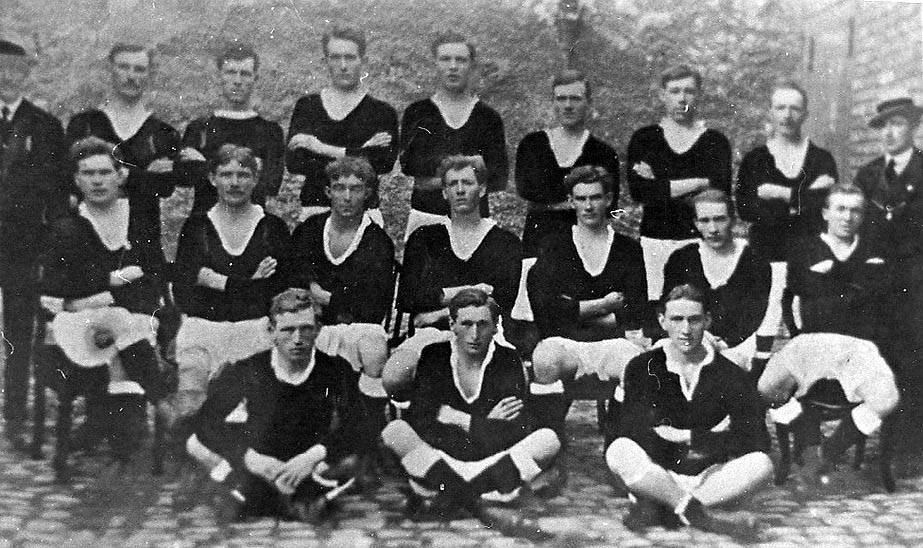
1919 Galway team

Galway played in the 1919 All-Ireland SFC final, its first appearance at that stage of the competition. After defeating Cavan by a scoreline of 4–2 to 2–2 in the replay of the teams' semi-final meeting, Galway lost the final to Kildare by a scoreline of 2–5 to 0–1.

Galway won the 1925 All-Ireland SFC title, its first. That championship became known for the farcical manner in which the play-offs took place. The Connacht SFC final was not held in time to decide the team that would play against one of the other three provinces in the All-Ireland SFC semi-finals. Mayo, as the winner of the previous season's Connacht SFC, was nominated to represent the province. Mayo defeated Wexford in their All-Ireland SFC semi-final encounter, while Kerry defeated Cavan in the other All-Ireland SFC semi-final. However, both Kerry and Cavan were disqualified for fielding illegal players, Mayo being declared champions without the need for a final. However, in the meantime, Galway defeated Mayo in the Connacht SFC final, which led to some confusion. The nomination of Mayo to represent Connacht was withdrawn and Galway was declared the rightful winner of both the Connacht SFC and the All-Ireland SFC.

However, the GAA ordered replays of the All-Ireland SFC semi-finals, with Galway taking the place of Connacht SFC champions. Kerry then complained that its All-Ireland SFC semi-final victory over Cavan should stand. When the GAA insisted that it should not stand due to the disqualifications Kerry withdrew, allowing Cavan to advance to the All-Ireland SFC final. Galway defeated Cavan in that game. The farce went on at such length that the final was not played until 10 January 1926. In the end Cavan (though previously disqualified) finished with a silver medal, Mayo (though previously declared All-Ireland SFC champions) was eliminated, while Galway (though previously removed from the tournament) was its outright winner. Officially there was not any championship in 1925.

The 2025 Connacht championship game against New York will mark the 100th anniversary of the event.

=== 1925–1938: Second and third All-Ireland SFC titles ===
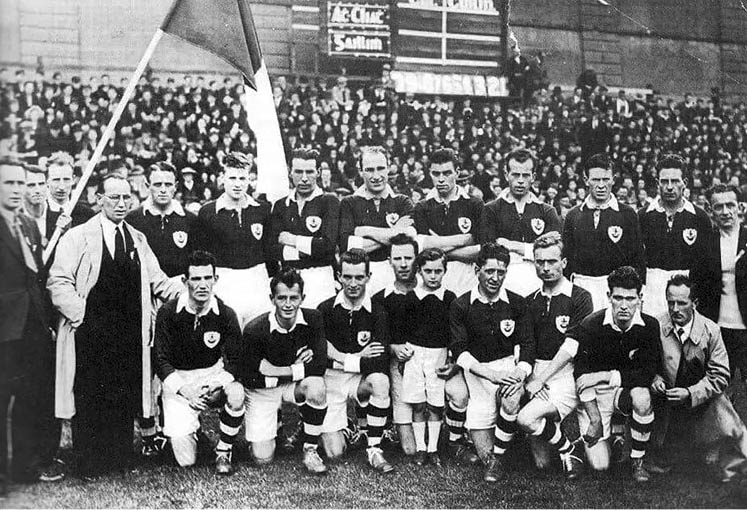
Team of Galway that defeated Dublin at the 1934 All-Ireland final

Galway's next All-Ireland SFC title came under more straightforward circumstances, in 1934. The team defeated Dublin by a scoreline of 3–5 to 1–9 in that year's final to take the Sam Maguire Cup to Connacht for the first time since its presentation to the winning team began (in 1928). Four years later (in the 1938 championship), Galway claimed its third All-Ireland SFC title. The final with Kerry had to replayed after it finished level at 3–3 to 2–6. Galway won that game by a scoreline of 2–4 to 0–7.

=== 1956–1974: Fourth All-Ireland SFC title and three-in-a-row ===
Galway's fourth All-Ireland SFC title came nearly twenty years later when the team defeated Cork at Croke Park by a scoreline of 2–13 to 3–7 in the 1956 final.

Galway began the 1960s with a Connacht SFC title. Wins over Mayo and Sligo took the team through to the 1960 Connacht SFC final. A win over Leitrim put Galway through to the All-Ireland SFC semi-finals, where the team was paired with Kerry. A goal scored by a Kerry player proved decisive as Galway lost by a scoreline of 1–08 to 0–08.

Galway's fifth All-Ireland SFC title came in 1964. The team won a second consecutive title, and sixth overall, in the 1965 final. Galway defeated Kerry in both those games.

1966 was perhaps Galway's most successful year in football. The team's Connacht SFC campaign began in Castlebar against Roscommon, Galway winning, by a score of 1–11 to 0–5. In the final, Galway came up against Mayo in Castlebar and were fortunate to win, edging Mayo out by a single point with a final scoreline of 0–12 to 1–8. The semi-final win over Cork was a close gamer as Johnny Geraghty made two critical saves from Niall Fitzgerald in the second half. Galway eked out a win 1–11 to 1–9, with Jimmy Duggan again excelling, Colie McDonagh fitting in well and Cyril Dunne (1–7) the most prominent of Galway's forwards. Meath defeated Down in the other All-Ireland SFC semi-final and approached the All-Ireland SFC final as firm favourites to win against Galway. However, Galway defeated Meath comfortably, with a concluding scoreline of 1–10 to 0–7. That victory sealed a significant third consecutive All-Ireland SFC title.

Aiming to achieve a fourth consecutive All-Ireland SFC title, Galway lost to Mayo in the 1967 Connacht SFC semi-final. Galway won back the Connacht SFC title in 1968, defeating Mayo in the final, only to be defeated by Down in the All-Ireland SFC semi-final. A replay was required to separate Galway and Mayo in the 1969 Connacht SFC final. Mayo won.

Galway won Connacht SFC titles in 1970 and 1971. Roscommon defeated Galway in a replay of the 1972 Connacht SFC semi-final. Galway then defeated Mayo and Roscommon respectively in the 1973 and 1974 Connacht SFC finals. Despite several All-Ireland SFC final appearances in the early 1970s and another in 1983, neither decade was as successful for the team as the 1960s had been. Galway made it to the final in 1971, 1973 and 1974, but lost each time, being beaten respectively by Offaly, Cork and Dublin.

=== 1975–1989: Connacht SFCs and All-Ireland SFC final appearance ===
Galway won five Connacht SFC titles during the 1980s, though qualified for the All-Ireland SFC final in just one of those years. The team came close to advancing to the All-Ireland SFC final at the expense of eventual champions Offaly in 1982, leading for most of the 1982 All-Ireland SFC semi-final, before losing the game to a point which Brendan Lowry scored.

The 1983 All-Ireland Senior Football Championship Final was the one final Galway qualified for during the 1980s. The team's opponent in that game was Dublin. That match became infamous for several instances of foul play and thuggery. Following an indisciplined beginning to the game, Barney Rock scored a strange goal from a distance of forty yards after a poor free-out from Galway goalkeeper Pádraig Coyne. Galway's players objected to the goal being allowed, asserting that Dublin manager Kevin Heffernan was interfering with play by tending to the injured Joe McNally. The goal stood, however. Shortly afterwards, following a tussle in midfield, Dublin's Brian Mullins swung his arm backwards, connecting with Brian Talty; referee John Gough sent Mullins off. Then, not long before half-time, a number of players clashed beneath the Hogan Stand, leading Gough to send off a player from each side: Dublin's Ray Hazley and Galway's Tomás Tierney.

The match remained heated until half-time. Players from both sides clashed in the tunnel as they left the field for the break. Although rumours circulated for years about this incident, whatever happened in the tunnel, stayed in the tunnel. Whatever peace that the time apart may have brought vanished five minutes after the restart, with the dismissal of Dublin player Kieran Duff; Duff kicked Galway's Pat O'Neill as he lay on the ground. This left Dublin with twelve men on the field to Galway's fourteen. However, the Galway team could not avail of its two-man advantage and lost the game by a scoreline of 1–10 to 1–8. In the aftermath of the match, Galway players Tomás Tierney and Peter Lee received one-month bans, while four individuals from the Dublin team received bans, including a twelve-month ban for Duff (for the kick to O'Neill's head) and a three-month ban to manager Heffernan.

Depleted by four injuries and a fifth to free-taker Gay McManus, the Galway team was well beaten by Kerry in the 1984 All-Ireland SFC semi-final. The team came close in the 1986 All-Ireland SFC semi-final against Tyrone. Galway also came close in the 1987 All-Ireland SFC semi-final against Cork, when Larry Tompkins forced a replay. After that semi-final though, the team hit a provincial slump, which kept it out of the All-Ireland SFC reckoning for some time.

=== 1989–2004: Eighth and ninth All-Ireland SFC titles ===
Galway did not win another Connacht SFC title until 1995. The team defeated Mayo by seven points in that year's Connacht SFC final to qualify for an All-Ireland SFC semi-final; however, a three-point loss to Tyrone knocked Galway out of the competition. Mayo knocked Galway out of the next two Connacht SFCs, winning the competition on both occasions.

But the team did not have to wait as long as before for their next Connacht SFC title.

In the 1998 championship, led by Mayo-born manager John O'Mahony, Galway won their first round encounter with Mayo, before overcoming Leitrim by a scoreline of 1–16 to 0–05 in the semi-final. The first final ended as a draw, 11 points apiece with Roscommon, but Galway won the replay in Hyde Park. In the semis, Galway came up against Ulster SFC champions Derry, and won by a scoreline of 0–16 to 1–09. In the final the team faced a Kildare team that had just beaten the previous year's All-Ireland SFC champion, Kerry, and was coached by eight time All-Ireland SFC winning manager Mick O'Dwyer. Galway went into the final as underdog, but Jarlath Fallon and Michael Donnellan excelled in their performances and a young Pádraic Joyce scored a goal to help Galway defeat Kildare by a scoreline of 1–14 to 1–10. Galway's captain Ray Silke raised the Sam Maguire Cup aloft; the team was the first from Connacht to win an All-Ireland SFC title in 32 years.

Galway made a strong start to the new millennium. After beating Leitrim in the 2000 Connacht SFC final, Galway faced Kildare in the All-Ireland SFC semi-final. The team won by a scoreline of 0–15 to 2–6, advancing to the final, with Pádraic Joyce scoring seven of Galway's points. Galway's opponent in the final was a Kerry team managed by eight time All-Ireland SFC winning player, Páidí Ó Sé. Galway came from behind to draw level with Kerry at 0–14 each, sending the game to a replay. Galway lost that game by four points, on a final scoreline of 0–17 to 1–10.

Galway revived the following year. A rule change to the competition ahead of the 2001 All-Ireland SFC introduced a qualifier round that would allow teams eliminated from their provincial championship to progress to the latter stages of the All-Ireland SFC. Galway had to avail of this new "back door" after Roscommon knocked the team out of the Connacht SFC at the semi-final stage. Galway thus arrived into Round 3 of the All-Ireland SFC qualifiers, where the team was paired with Armagh. Galway emerged as the winner on a scoreline of 0–13 to 0–12 after a hard-fought game, with Paul Clancy scoring the winning point. After that, Galway faced beaten Munster SFC finalists Cork in Round 4 of the All-Ireland SFC qualifiers. Galway won that game by a scoreline of 1–14 to 1–10, thus qualifying for the newly introduced All-Ireland SFC quarter-finals.

In that game, Galway and Roscommon were paired together, Galway playing the team that had knocked it into the All-Ireland SFC qualifiers to begin with. Roscommon lost by a scoreline of 0–14 to 1–05, with Galway qualifying for an All-Ireland SFC semi-final against fellow "back door" team Derry. Galway won that game by three points, qualifying for the 2001 All-Ireland Senior Football Championship Final, the first team to qualify for an All-Ireland SFC final without being champion of its own province. However, Galway approached the game as massive underdog, with opponent Meath having beaten the previous year's champions Kerry by a scoreline of 2–14 to 0-05, limiting Kerry to a single point in the second half. The outcome was not what Meath supporters anticipated; after finishing the first half level with six points apiece, Galway emerged after the break to blow Meath away, scoring eleven second-half points to Meath's two, giving a final score of 0–17 to 0–08. Pádraic Joyce scored ten points in the game to take his tally in eight games to 3–45, finishing as the competition's top scorer. It was Galway's second All-Ireland SFC title in four years and made the county the first "back door" champions; on this occasion it was Gary Fahey who raised the Sam Maguire Cup aloft for his county.

Galway won another Connacht SFC title in 2002, defeating Sligo by a goal to win the final at MacHale Park. However, the team did not fare as well outside Connacht, losing to Kerry by a scoreline of 2–17 to 1–12 in the 2002 All-Ireland SFC quarter-final. Galway won another Connacht SFC title in 2003, this time defeating Mayo in the final. However, the team was again beaten in the 2003 All-Ireland SFC quarter-final, on this occasion losing by three points to Donegal.

Galway lost its status as Connacht SFC winner in 2004, in a semi-final defeat to Mayo. 2004's Championship saw the team lose their status as Connacht champions, as Mayo defeated the team in that year's semi-final. Galway met the previous year's All-Ireland SFC winner Tyrone in Round 3 of the 2004 All-Ireland SFC qualifiers; Tyrone won and eliminated Galway from the competition. In August of that year, O'Mahony left his post as manager, having been in charge of the team for seven years, winning four Connacht SFC titles and two All-Ireland SFC titles.

=== 2004–2014: After O'Mahony ===
Fellow Mayo native Peter Ford replaced O'Mahony as team manager. Galway won back the Connacht SFC title in 2005, defeating Mayo by a scoreline of 0–10 to 0–8 in the final. However, Cork knocked Galway out in a 2005 All-Ireland SFC quarter-final, Galway losing by a scoreline of 2–14 to 2–11.

Galway qualified for the 2006 Connacht SFC final after defeating Sligo and Roscommon in the quarter-final and semi-final respectively. Mayo was again the opponent and Mayo won. Then Westmeath knocked Galway out in the team's next game, a 2006 All-Ireland SFC Round 4 qualifier which Galway lost by one point.

Galway defeated Mayo by a scoreline of 2–10 to 0–09 in the 2007 Connacht SFC quarter-final, before overcoming Leitrim by a scoreline of 0–17 to 1–10 in the semi-final. But the team then lost the final by a single point to Sligo, a county that had not won a Connacht SFC since 1975. Again Galway lost the 2007 All-Ireland SFC qualifier, this time to Meath by a scoreline of 2–14 to 1-14. Ford left his post at the end of the championship, with Liam Sammon replacing him as manager. Sammon was the first Galway native to take charge of the team for almost a decade.

Galway defeated Mayo in the 2008 Connacht SFC final by a scoreline of 2–12 to 1–14 to regain the Connacht SFC title. The team then lost its 2008 All-Ireland SFC quarter-final by a scoreline of 1–21 to 1–16 to that competition's eventual runner-up, Kerry.

Galway's opening game of the 2009 Connacht SFC was away to London, Galway winning that by a scoreline of 1–18 to 1–07. Galway then played Sligo in the Connacht SFC semi-final, a game in which only a point from Joe Bergin and a Seán Armstrong goal in injury time separated the sides, as Galway won by a scoreline of 1–13 to 0-12, and advanced to the county's fifth consecutive Connacht SFC final. There Galway played Mayo, that team approaching the match after a 3–18 to 0–07 win against Roscommon. Mayo led for much of the final, with the score at 2–11 to 0–10 late in the game. Galway attempted a late fightback, beginning with a Michael Meehan free and — with 72 minutes on the clock — Meehan scored a goal that tied the game at 2–11 to 1–14. In the 73rd minute, however, Peadár Gardiner of Mayo scored the winning point for his team. Galway entered the final round of the 2009 All-Ireland SFC qualifiers. The county lost its game to Donegal by one point. This defeat marked the end of Galway's 2009 campaign and the end of Sammon's tenure as team manager, as he declined to remain in charge for the third year he had originally been offered when appointed.

Joe Kernan — the former All-Ireland SFC winning manager with Armagh — was appointed as Sammon's successor. Galway narrowly avoided defeat to minnows New York in the 2010 Connacht SFC, emerging with a scoreline of 2–13 to 0-12. The Connacht SFC semi-final against Sligo showed little improvement, and at half-time, Galway trailed Sligo by a scoreline of 1–8 to 0–2. However, Galway managed to salvage an undeserved draw, with an Eoin Concannon goal and a Gareth Bradshaw point levelling the match at 1–10 apiece. Sligo defeated Galway in the replay, by a scoreline of 1–14 to 0-16, knocking Galway into the 2010 All-Ireland SFC qualifiers. There Galway met Wexford in a Round 2 game at Pearse Stadium, a week after the Sligo defeat. A 1–11 to 0–13 defeat to Wexford knocked Galway out of the All-Ireland SFC, the team's second consecutive single-point All-Ireland SFC qualifier defeat. Kernan resigned on 4 August 2010, after only one year in charge. Kernan said he felt his position as manager was being "undermined".

In October 2010, former Westmeath boss Tomás Ó Flatharta was appointed as Kernan's successor. 2011 proved to be another disappointing year for the footballers, however, as they were relegated to Division 2 of the National League. The 2011 Connacht SFC began poorly; despite taking a first-half lead, Galway lost to Mayo. The 1–12 to 1–6 defeat sent Galway to the All-Ireland SFC qualifiers again. Galway suffered yet another one-point defeat, this time to Meath on a scoreline of 0–11 to 0–10. Ó Flatharta was axed as manager after one year in charge.

In October 2011, Alan Mulholland — the former under-21 county team manager — was appointed as senior manager in place of Ó Flatharta. The 2012 season brought a vast improvement for the team, from that year's FBD League and then onwards to the National League quarter-final, a campaign which brought wins against Derry, Meath and Monaghan, two defeats by Westmeath and Tyrone, and two draws against Louth and Kildare after extra-time. Galway began the 2012 Connacht SFC well, defeating Roscommon comfortably by a scoreline of 3–15 to 0-10. However a 2–15 to 0–16 Connacht SFC semi-final defeat to Sligo followed, Adrian Marren scoring the two goals. Antrim knocked Galway out of the 2012 All-Ireland SFC, which raised many questions about the structures and organisation of football in the county and how the county had fallen back, having been a power in the game ten years previously.

The 2013 National League campaign was mixed, missing out on promotion to Division 1 for the second season in a row. Galway began the 2013 Connacht SFC poorly, with Mayo defeating the county by a scoreline of 4–16 to 0–11 at Galway's own stadium. Galway ended the game with 13 players after two received red cards. This defeat sent Galway into the All-Ireland SFC qualifiers.

Despite being the first All-Ireland SFC winner to have come through the "back door" in 2001, Galway's form outside of the Connacht SFC had been extremely poor for a number of years, with a win over Louth in the 2004 All-Ireland SFC standing as their only victory outside of Connacht in the Championship from 2002 to 2012.

In the first qualifier round, Galway were drawn at home to Tipperary. Galway managed a first victory outside of Connacht in just under nine years, with an unconvincing 1–12 to 0–11 win, at Pearse Stadium. This was followed up by a narrow win over Waterford in Round 2, Galway winning by just one point with a Michael Meehan goal proving vital. This win set up a Round 3 game with Armagh, who had come through their qualifier matches with relative ease, and entered the match as favourites. Despite going into the match as underdogs, Galway produced a strong performance to knock Armagh out, beating the Ulster side by 1–11 to 0–09. This win put Galway through to a Round 4 meeting with Munster SFC runner-up Cork. Galway entered the match even more unfancied than they had been against Armagh but a strong performance saw the team come up just short, losing by a single point, having led the game by four points at one stage.

2014 saw Galway have a poor start to the league, coming close to relegation to Division 3 but managed to survive after winning the last two games. Galway began the 2014 Connacht SFC with a comprehensive win over the previous year's finalists London, winning by a scoreline of 3–17 to 0-07. The win over London put Galway through to a Connacht SFC semi-final against Sligo at Markievicz Park, a game which Galway eventually won by a scoreline of 0–16 to 0–11. In what was the team's first Connacht SFC final in five years, Galway faced Mayo at Mayo's home ground of MacHale Park in Castlebar. Mayo, the reigning champions, ran out winners by a scoreline of 3–14 to 0–16, winning a fourth consecutive Connacht SFC title. Qualifying for a provincial final meant that Galway entered Round 4 of the 2014 All-Ireland SFC qualifiers, the stage at which they had been knocked out in 2013. This time they faced a Tipperary team that had beaten Longford and Laois in the previous rounds. The game took place in neutral venue, with the counties meeting at O'Connor Park, Tullamore. The score was close for most of the first half, but two goals before half-time by Fiontán Ó Curraoin and then Tom Flynn put Galway into a six-point at the break. Early in the second half, two more goals from Danny Cummins and Michael Lundy gave Galway a further stranglehold on the game. Late goals from Tipperary brought the deficit back to five points, but Galway held on for a final score of 4–17 to 4-12, putting the team through to its first quarter-final since 2008. Galway's opponents in Croke Park were Kerry with the teams meeting on August 3. However, Galway fell short against eventual All-Ireland SFC champions Kerry, a result which led to Alan Mulholland stepping down as manager.

=== 2014–present: Management of former players, Walsh and Joyce ===
In September 2014, former Sligo manager Kevin Walsh was installed as the new Galway manager. The 2015 season proved to be a mixed period during the league. Despite a good start in their first two outings with wins over Meath and Westmeath, Galway fell short against Down and against Cavan and Laois but showed great confidence against old rivals Roscommon despite being behind by seven points at half-time. The game against Kildare proved pivotal; it resulted in Kildare being relegated to Division 3 and Galway remaining in Division 2.

In the 2015 Connacht SFC, Galway defeated New York and Leitrim before losing to Mayo in the semi-final. The team then defeated Armagh in a 2016 All-Ireland SFC qualifier. Then defeated Derry in another. Then Donegal knocked Galway out.

During the 2016 season, Galway was set to face archrival Mayo in Castlebar in the Connacht SFC semi-final. After staying close to the favourite for the majority of the game, Galway seemed to be slipping away. Down four points with less than 20 minutes to go, Gary Sice reduced the deficit to one point. On the ensuing kick-out, Thomas Flynn stole the ball and went nose in towards the Mayo goalmouth and scored. Galway added two more quick points to go up two minutes after being down four. Galway held on to the lead in the end, winning by a scoreline of 1–12 to 0–12 in what was one of the most unexpected wins of the 2016 championship. Galway took on Roscommon in the 2016 Connacht SFC final, held on a rain-soaked day at Pearse Stadium. Galway gave up a two-point lead, allowing Roscommon to force a replay. A week later, Galway made sure the first game was as close to the Nestor Cup as Roscommon would get. Two goals by Danny Cummins and one by Gary Sice gave Galway an 11-point victory in the replay. Galway was Connacht SFC winner for a 45th time (but for the first time in eight years). In the 2016 All-Ireland SFC quarter-final, Galway met Tipperary. Galway lost that game by a scoreline of 3–13 to 1–10.

Galway began the 2017 season, with its second consecutive FBD League title in a row. Ahead of the 2017 National League, Galway had one clear objective — gain promotion to Division 1. After six seasons in Division 2, Galway gained promotion after a campaign that yielded five wins, a draw with Cork, and the only loss being a one-point defeat against Meath in Navan. In the Division 2 final, Galway played first-placed Kildare. After a high scoring second half, Galway defeated Kildare by a scoreline of 0–18 to 0-16, earning a second cup that season and a first win at Croke Park since the 2001 All-Ireland SFC final.

In the 2017 Connacht SFC semi-final, Galway faced old rivals Mayo at Pearse Stadium. The game was tight, with Mayo appearing to pull away with a win but Galway ultimately won, on a scoreline of 0–15 to 1-11, to earn them a place in the Connacht SFC final. Galway faced Roscommon in a repeat of the previous year; this game was, however, different, with Roscommon running riot during the first half. The second half was a much more tense battle but became bad tempered towards the end. Roscommon won by a scoreline of 2–15 to 0-12. Galway faced Donegal in the final round of the 2017 All-Ireland SFC qualifiers at Markievicz Park, Sligo, which proved to be a one-sided game as Galway defeated Donegal by a scoreline of 4–17 to 0–14 and advance to another All-Ireland SFC quarter-final. There, Galway faced Kerry at Croke Park, a team the county had not beaten at that venue since the 1965 All-Ireland SFC final. A goal by Kerry forward Kieran Donaghy contributed to a Galway loss by a scoreline of 1–18 to 0–13.

During the 2018 season, Galway defeated Mayo, Sligo and Roscommon to win the Connacht SFC. Galway qualified for the 2018 Super 8s (a revised All-Ireland SFC quarter-final as group stage). Wins against Kerry and Kildare were followed with a loss to Monaghan. Galway qualified for an All-Ireland SFC semi-final meeting with Dublin. Galway lost.

During the 2019 season, Galway lost the Connacht SFC final to Roscommon at Pearse Stadium, despite Roscommon being behind by five points at half-time. The 2019 All-Ireland SFC campaign ended after the first game, a loss to Mayo. Walsh resigned as manager two months later, after five years in charge.

=== Pádraic Joyce era ===
Pádraic Joyce replaced his former teammate Walsh as manager in 2019, with his stated aim being to win an All-Ireland SFC. During the 2020 season, Galway qualified for the Connacht SFC final against Mayo without playing any games. The team's quarter-final against New York and its semi-final against Sligo could not be played due to the impact of the COVID-19 pandemic on Gaelic games. Galway had previously qualified for Connacht SFC finals without playing any games (between 1933–1940, when all Connacht SFC finals were between Galway and Mayo, and also in 1965, Galway received a bye to the Connacht SFC final). Galway lost to Mayo by one point in the 2020 Connacht SFC final. No All-Ireland SFC qualifiers were held in 2020, also due to the pandemic.

==== 2021 ====
During the 2021 season, Galway defeated Roscommon in the Connacht SFC semi-final, in what was Joyce's first championship win as manager. But Galway lost to Mayo in the final, despite having a five-point lead at half-time.

==== 2022 ====
During the 2022 season, Galway won the Connacht SFC, defeating Roscommon in the final and qualifying for a 2022 All-Ireland SFC quarter-final game against Armagh. After a game which included a brawl and attempted eye-gouging of Damien Comer at the end of normal time, Galway defeated Armagh 4–1 on penalties. Galway advanced to an All-Ireland SFC semi-final, in which its opponent was Derry. Galway defeated Derry in the All-Ireland SFC semi-final and qualified for an All-Ireland SFC final for the first time since 2001, following a game which sparked controversy when the GAA's Hawk-Eye score detection system erroneously deemed Shane Walsh's free kick before half time wide, despite replays showing it was between the posts. The error was rectified before the second half commenced and the score was registered. The GAA later confirmed that Hawk-Eye would not be in use for the second semi-final game and that a full review would be launched. Galway lost the All-Ireland SFC final against Kerry on 24 July 2022.

==== 2023 ====
During the 2023 season, Galway defeated Sligo in the Connacht SFC final, but lost to Armagh in the All-Ireland SFC group stage and advanced to the preliminary quarter-final against Mayo, in which they lost by a single point, bowing out of the 2023 championship.

==== 2024 ====
Galway opened 2024 win a loss in the final of the FBD League to Roscommon. In the National League, they managed to avoid relegation from Division 1 after a poor start to the campaign. They won their 50th Connacht Championship, defeating Mayo in the final qualifying as top seeds for the All-Ireland Series. where they faced Armagh, Derry and Westmeath. They finished second in the group, defeating Monaghan before facing Dublin in the quarter-final and Donegal in the semi-final. Beating Donegal by two points, they again faced Armagh in the final on 30 July.

==== 2024 All-Ireland Final ====
Galway were without captain Seán Kelly, but went in level at half time, with the scores 0-6 each. Galway opened the scoring in the second half with points from Paul Conroy and Shane Walsh but Armagh drew level with scores from Oisín Conaty and Rian O'Neill. The decisive moment came with Aaron McKay's goal for Armagh. Galway would reduced the deficient to one point but Walsh and Dylan McHugh would miss chances to equalise late on, with Armagh claiming victory.

==== 2025 ====
In the 2025 Connacht championship after being postponed during COVID-19 in 2020 their game against New York was rearranged to take place in the opening game will mark 100th anniversary of Galway's 1st ever All Ireland title a remembrance celebration will be held at half time at the match in 1925.

== Rivalries ==
- Armagh-Galway Gaelic football rivalry
- Dublin–Galway Gaelic football rivalry
- Galway–Kerry Gaelic football rivalry
- Galway–Mayo Gaelic football rivalry
- Cork–Galway Gaelic football rivalry
- Galway-Roscommon Gaelic football rivalry

== Panel ==
Team as per Galway vs Dublin in the 2026 All-Ireland Senior Football Championship Quarter-Final, 28 June 2026

No.	Player	Position	Club
1	Connor Gleeson	Goalkeeper	Dunmore MacHales
2	Jack Glynn	Right corner-back	Claregalway
3	Cian Hernon	Full-back	Barna
4	Liam Silke	Left corner-back	Corofin
5	Dylan McHugh	Right half-back	Corofin
6	John Daly	Centre-back	Mountbellew–Moylough
20	Kieran Molloy	Left half-back	Corofin
8	Paul Conroy	Midfield	St James'
9	John Maher (c)	Midfield	Salthill–Knocknacarra
22	Céin D'Arcy	Right half-forward	Ballyboden St Enda's
24	Finnian Ó Laoí	Centre forward	An Spidéal
12	Cillian McDaid	Left half-forward	Monivea-Abbey
13	Robert Finnerty	Right corner-forward	Salthill–Knocknacarra
14	Matthew Tierney	Full-forward	Oughterard
15	Shane Walsh	Left corner-forward	Kilmacud Crokes

No.	Player	Position	Club
16	Conor Flaherty	Goalkeeper	Claregalway
17	Brian Cogger	Wing-back	Corofin
18	Seán Ó Maoilchiaráin	Full-back	Oileáin Árann
19	Johnny McGrath	Corner-back	Caherlistrane
7	Seán Kelly	Centre-back	Moycullen
21	Fionn McDonagh	Corner-forward	Moycullen
23	Daniel O'Flaherty	Wing-back	Salthill–Knocknacarra
11	Shane McGrath	Centre-forward	Dunmore MacHales
25	Jack Mullen	Corner-forward	Claregalway
26	Damien Comer	Full-forward	Annaghdown
27	Liam Ó Conghaile	Corner-forward	An Spidéal

^{INJ} Player has had an injury which has affected recent involvement with the county team.
^{RET} Player has since retired from the county team.
^{WD} Player has since withdrawn from the county team due to a non-injury issue.

== Management team ==
Vacant since 3 September 2026 following the departure of Pádraic Joyce.

== Managerial history ==
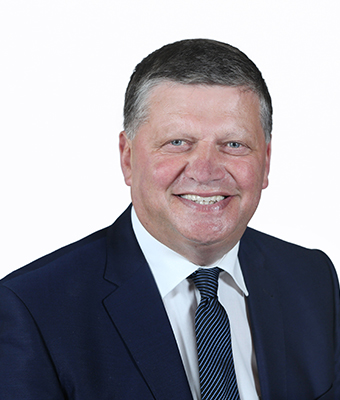
John O'Mahony

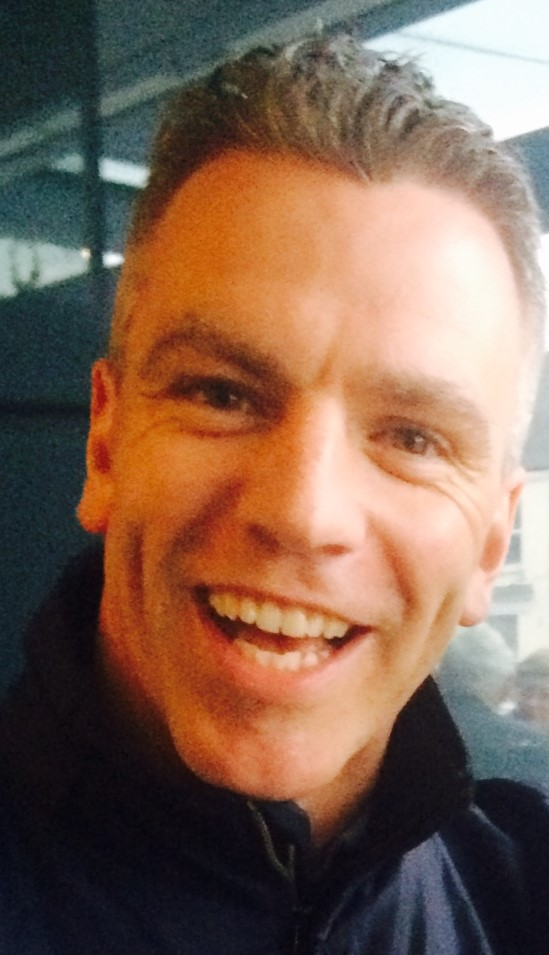
Pádraic Joyce

Between them, O'Mahony and Joyce managed Galway in their five most recent All-Ireland SFC finals, with Joyce playing under O'Mahony in the first three of those.

Mick O'Dwyer described the Galway senior managerial role as third most attractive after the equivalent roles over Dublin and Kerry.

Dates	Name	Origin
1975–1977	Enda Colleran	Mountbellew–Moylough
1977–1978	Tom Sands	?
1978–1980	Liam O'Neill	St Grellan's
1980–1983	Mattie McDonagh	Ballygar
1983–1984	Tony Regan	?
1984–1986	Cyril Dunne	St Grellan's
1986–1989	Willie Joyce	Killererin
1989–1993	John Tobin	Tuam Stars
1993–1996	Bosco McDermott	Dunmore/Williamstown
1996–1997	Val Daly	Mountbellew–Moylough
1997–2004	John O'Mahony	
2004–2007	Peter Ford	
2007–2009	Liam Sammon	Father Griffins/Salthill-Knocknacarra
2009–2010	Joe Kernan	
2010–2011	Tomás Ó Flatharta	
2011–2014	Alan Mulholland	Salthill-Knocknacarra
2014–2019	Kevin Walsh	Killannin
2019–2026	Pádraic Joyce	Killererin
2026–	Éamonn Fitzmaurice	

== Players ==
=== Notable players ===
- Gareth Bradshaw
- Gary Fahey
- Pádraic Joyce

=== Dynasties ===
Several families have seen successive members play on the county team. Joe Duggan was on Galway football teams that lost three-in-a-row in the 1940s, his son Jimmy was on teams that lost three finals in four years between 1971 and 1974. John "Tull" Dunne won two All-Ireland SFCs in 1934 and 1938, His son, Cyril Dunne, was part of the three-in-a-row team that won All-Ireland SFCs in 1964, 1965 and 1966, a team which John "Tull" Dunne managed. Michael Donnellan was on the 1925 team that won an All Ireland SFC by default (officially no All-Ireland SFC was held in 1925), and the 1934 team which won it without question. His sons, John Donnellan and Pat Donnellan were on the three-in-a-row teams of the 1960s and, in 1998, grandson Michael sent the pass to Pádraic Joyce for a breakthrough goal to secure the first of two All-Ireland SFCs won over a four-year period.

Galway's Donnellans are, according to Colm Keys in the Irish Independent, "well established as a three-generation family of inter-county footballers, Michael and John of more recent vintage are sons of John, and nephews of Pat, whose father Mick played for Galway in the 1920s".

=== Team of the Millennium ===
This was a team chosen in 1999 by a panel of Galway GAA past presidents and journalists. The goal was to single out the best ever 15 players who had played for Galway in their respective positions, since the foundation of the GAA in 1884 up to the Millennium year, 2000. The players in bold also made the All-Ireland selection of the GAA Team of the Millennium.

	Goalkeeper
	Johnny Geraghty (Father Griffins)
Right corner-back	Full-back	Left corner-back
**Enda Colleran** (Mountbellew–Moylough)	Noel Tierney (Milltown)	Tom Dillion (Ahascragh & St Grellan's)
Right half-back	Centre-back	Left half-back
John Donnellan (Dunmore McHales)	Tommy Joe Gilmore (Cortoon Shamrocks)	Seán Óg De Paor (An Cheathrú Rua)
	Midfield
John "Tull" Dunne (St Grellan's)		Mattie McDonagh (Ballygar)
Right half-forward	Centre-forward	Left half-forward
Cyril Dunne (St Grellan's)	**Seán Purcell** (Tuam Stars)	Séamus Leydon (Dunmore McHales)
Right corner-forward	Full-forward	Left corner-forward
John Keenan (Dunmore McHales)	Frank Stockwell (Tuam Stars)	Brendan Nestor (Dunmore McHales)

== Colours and crest ==
Galway's traditional colours are maroon and white. In the early years of GAA competition, Galway teams wore the colours of the Galway Senior Football Championship winner. In 1936, however, the county adopted maroon as its primary colour. A crest was added to the jersey in the 1950s, with a different crest for hurling than for football. Although the team most often wears white shorts and maroon socks, it has also worn an all maroon kit in the past.

The football team began using the same jerseys and crest as the hurling team ahead of the 2013 National Football League. The new crest was mostly similar to the previous hurling crest, with the most notable differences being the angle of the boat, and the replacement of the letters CLG with GAA.

Galway's final football crest depicted a Galway hooker (a traditional fishing boat) along with a Gaelic football, and contained the county motto Ceart agus Cóir.

=== Team sponsorship ===
The first sponsor of any Galway team was Tommy Varden's Catering service, in the mid to late 1980s. Sponsorship was not as open in the GAA at that time, and it was not until 1991 that regulations around sponsorship were eased. The Tommy Varden sponsorship of the footballers was followed by the Supermac's fast food chain sponsoring the Galway hurlers for the first time in 1989.

In 2008, Tommy Varden ended its 25-year association with Galway football; Aer Arann replaced it as sponsor. But, upon entering receivership, Aer Arann was forced to pull out of the sponsorship two years early, having sponsored the footballers for the 2008, 2009 and 2010 seasons.

In 2011, it was announced that the football team's jersey would carry the logo of Cancer Care West. This gave Galway's football team the distinction of becoming the first GAA team to display the name of a charity on its county jersey, instead of a corporate sponsor.

Beginning in the 2013 season, and with a planned five-year sponsorship, Supermac's, previously the sponsors of only the hurlers, began sponsoring both the football and hurling teams.

The company announced its latest five-year sponsorship deal in November 2022, expected to last until 2027.

Years	Sponsor	
Years	Manufacturer	Sponsor
1880s–1983	O'Neills (1918–)	No Sponsor
1983–1989	O'Neills (1918–)	Tommy Varden Catering
2008–2011	O'Neills (1918–)	Aer Arann
2011–2012	O'Neills (1918–)	Cancer Care West
2013–	O'Neills (1918–)	Supermac's

== Competitive record ==
=== All-Ireland Senior Football Championship ===
This is Galway's record in All-Ireland SFC finals. Bold denotes a year in which the team won the competition.

Year	Venue	Result	Attendance
1919	Croke Park	Kildare 2–5 Galway 0–1	32,000
1922	Croke Park	Dublin 0–6 Galway 0–4	11,7922
**1925**	Croke Park	Galway 3–2 Cavan 1–2	Not known
1933	Croke Park	Cavan 2–5 Galway 1–4	45,188
**1934**	Croke Park	Galway 3–5 Dublin 1–9	36,143
1938	Croke Park	Galway 3–3 Kerry 2–6	68,950
**1938**	Croke Park	Galway 2–4 Kerry 0–7	47,851
1940	Croke Park	Kerry 0–7 Galway 1–3	60,821
1941	Croke Park	Kerry 1–8 Galway 0–7	45,512
1942	Croke Park	Dublin 1–10 Galway 1–8	37,105
**1956**	Croke Park	Galway 2–13 Cork 3–7	70,772
1959	Croke Park	Kerry 3–7 Galway 1–4	85,897
1963	Croke Park	Dublin 1–9 Galway 0–10	87,106
**1964**	Croke Park	Galway 0–15 Kerry 0–10	76,498
**1965**	Croke Park	Galway 0–12 Kerry 0–9	77,735
**1966**	Croke Park	Galway 1–10 Meath 0–7	71,569
1971	Croke Park	Offaly 1–14 Galway 2–8	70,789
1973	Croke Park	Cork 3–17 Galway 2–13	73,308
1974	Croke Park	Dublin 0–14 Galway 1–6	71,898
1983	Croke Park	Dublin 1–10 Galway 1–8	71,988
**1998**	Croke Park	Galway 1–14 Kildare 1–10	65,886
2000	Croke Park	Galway 0–14 Kerry 0–14	Not known
2000	Croke Park	Kerry 0–17 Galway 1–10	64,094
**2001**	Croke Park	Galway 0–17 Meath 0–8	70,842
2022	Croke Park	Kerry 0–20 Galway 0–16	82,300
2024	Croke Park	Armagh 1–11 Galway 0–13	82,300

=== National Football League ===
This is Galway's record in National Football League finals. Bold denotes a year in which the team won the competition.

Year	Venue	Winner	Score	Runner-up
**1940**	Croke Park	Galway	2–5 v 1–5	Meath
**1957**	Croke Park	Galway	1–8 v 0–6	Kerry
**1965**	Croke Park	Galway	1–7 v 0–8	Kerry
1966	Croke Park	Longford	0–9 v 0–8	Galway
**1981**	Croke Park	Galway	1–11 v 1–3	Roscommon
1984	Limerick	Kerry	1–11 v 0–11	Galway
2001	Croke Park	Mayo	0–13 v 0–12	Galway
2004	Croke Park	Kerry	3–11 v 1–16	Galway
2006	Limerick	Kerry	2–12 v 0–10	Galway

== Honours ==
=== National ===
- All-Ireland Senior Football Championship
  - (gold) Winners (9): 1925, 1934, 1938, 1956, 1964, 1965, 1966, 1998, 2001
  - (silver) Runners-up (15): 1919, 1922, 1933, 1940, 1941, 1942, 1959, 1963, 1971, 1973, 1974, 1983, 2000, 2022, 2024
- National Football League
  - (gold) Winners (4): 1939–40, 1956–57, 1964–65, 1980–81
  - (silver) Runners-up (6): 1965–66, 1983–84, 2000–01, 2004, 2006, 2018
- All-Ireland Junior Football Championship
  - (gold) Winners (4): 1931, 1958, 1965, 1985
  - (silver) Runners-up (4): 1994, 2003, 2018, 2019
- All-Ireland Under-21 Football Championship
  - (gold) Winners (5): 1972, 2002, 2005, 2011, 2013
  - (silver) Runners-up (4): 1981, 1989, 1992, 2017
- All-Ireland Under-20 Football Championship
  - (gold) Winners (1): 2020
- All-Ireland Minor Football Championship
  - (gold) Winners (7): 1952, 1960, 1970, 1976, 1986, 2007, 2022
  - (silver) Runners-up (4): 1994, 2016, 2018, 2019
- All-Ireland Vocational Schools Championship
  - (gold) Winners (3): 1964, 1965, 1976

=== Provincial ===
- Connacht Senior Football Championship
  - (gold) Winners (51): 1900, (Note: Galway unopposed in the Connacht SFC in 1900.) 1902, 1911, 1913, 1917, 1919, 1922, 1925, 1926, 1933, 1934, 1938, 1940, 1941, 1942, 1945, 1954, 1956, 1957, 1958, 1959, 1960, 1963, 1964, 1965, 1966, 1968, 1970, 1971, 1973, 1974, 1976, 1982, 1983, 1984, 1986, 1987, 1995, 1998, 2000, 2002, 2003, 2005, 2008, 2016, 2018, 2022, 2023, 2024, 2025
  - (silver) Runners-up (35): 1901, 1907, 1908, 1909, 1910, 1912, 1918, 1923, 1924, 1927, 1929, 1935, 1936, 1937, 1939, 1943, 1948, 1951, 1961, 1962, 1969, 1977, 1978, 1990, 1996, 1999, 2006, 2007, 2009, 2014, 2017, 2019, 2020, 2021, 2026
- Connacht FBD League
  - (gold) Winners (11): 1998, 2001, 2002, 2006, 2008, 2009, 2016, 2017, 2020, 2022, 2026
- Connacht Junior Football Championship
  - (gold) Winners (22): 1915, 1919, 1931, 1947, 1948, 1949, 1954, 1958, 1960, 1961, 1965, 1966, 1969, 1972, 1983, 1984, 1985, 1994, 1996, 2003, 2018, 2019
- Connacht Minor Football Championship
  - (gold) Winners (29): 1932, 1937, 1938, 1948, 1952, 1959, 1960, 1969, 1970, 1972, 1976, 1982, 1983, 1986, 1987, 1988, 1990, 1993, 1994, 1995, 2002, 2003, 2004, 2005, 2007, 2015, 2016, 2017, 2018
  - (silver) Runners-up (23): 1934, 1941, 1946, 1951, 1955, 1962, 1964, 1968, 1973, 1975, 1978, 1979, 1985, 1989, 1999, 2001, 2005, 2010, 2011, 2019, 2022, 2023, 2026
- Connacht Under-21 Football Championship
  - (gold) Winners (19): 1964, 1965, 1972, 1979, 1981, 1987, 1988, 1989, 1990, 1992, 1993, 1996, 1998, 2000, 2002, 2005, 2011, 2013, 2017
  - (silver) Runners-up (14): 1969, 1973, 1975, 1976, 1978, 1980, 1982, 1984, 1985, 1991, 1997, 2003, 2006, 2015, 2023, 2024
- Connacht Under-20 Football Championship
  - (gold) Winners (2): 2019, 2020
