= 2016 Galway county football team season =

Galway
2016 season
- Manager: Kevin Walsh
- Stadium: Pearse Stadium, Galway City
- NFL Division 2: 3rd
- All-Ireland SFC: Quarter-finalist
- Connacht SFC: Winner
- FBD Insurance League: Winner
- Top goalscorer: League: All: Danny Cummins (2–8)

The following is a summary of Galway county football team's 2016 season.

Galway began their campaign by securing a 6th FBD Insurance League title, with a win over Roscommon. Galway ended Mayo's bid for a sixth consecutive Connacht SFC title with an unlikely three-point victory at McHale Park. In the 2016 All-Ireland SFC quarter-final Galway were defeated by Tipperary.

== Kits ==
| Home | Change |

== Competitions ==
Win Draw Loss Postponed/Cancelled

== FBD League ==
=== Fixtures ===
| Date | Round | Home | Score | Away | Ground |
| 3 Jan | Group | Galway | 2-9 v 0-12 | Sligo | Tuam |
| 10 Jan | Group | Galway | 1-8 v 1-5 | Leitrim | Tuam |
| 17 Jan | Group | Galway | 0-13 v 0-10 | GMIT | Tuam |

=== Table ===
| Team | Pld | W | D | L | Pts | Diff |
|---|---|---|---|---|---|---|
| Galway | 3 | 3 | 0 | 0 | 6 | +14 |
| Leitrim | 3 | 2 | 0 | 1 | 4 | +18 |
| GMIT | 3 | 1 | 0 | 2 | 2 | –23 |
| Sligo | 3 | 0 | 0 | 3 | 0 | –9 |

== National Football League Division 2 ==
=== Fixtures ===
| Date | Round | Home | Score | Away | Ground |
| 31 Jan | Group | Laois | 1-10 - 3-12 | Galway | O'Moore Park, Portlaoise |
| 7 Feb | Group | Galway | 1-9 - 1-11 | Tyrone | Pearse Stadium, Salthill |
| 28 Feb | Group | Derry | 2-12 - 1-18 | Galway | Páirc na gCeilteach, Derry |
| 6 Mar | Group | Galway | 0-15 - 1-12 | Meath | Pearse Stadium, Salthill |
| 13 Mar | Group | Armagh | 1-15 - 1-15 | Galway | Athletic Grounds, Armagh |
| 27 Mar | Group | Galway | 0-15 - 0-15 | Fermanagh | St Jarlath's Park, Tuam |
| 3 Apr | Group | Cavan | 1-16 - 1-12 | Galway | Breffni Park, Cavan |

=== Table ===
Compete in Division 2 final and automatic promotion to Division 1
Automatic relegation to Division 3

| Team | Pld | W | D | L | F | A | Diff | Pts |
|---|---|---|---|---|---|---|---|---|
| Tyrone | 7 | 5 | 2 | 0 | 6-89 | 3-76 | 22 | 12 |
| Cavan | 7 | 5 | 0 | 2 | 8-102 | 3-81 | 36 | 10 |
| Galway | 7 | 2 | 3 | 2 | 7-96 | 7-91 | 5 | 7 |
| Fermanagh | 7 | 2 | 2 | 3 | 2-85 | 6-75 | -2 | 6 |
| Meath | 7 | 2 | 2 | 3 | 6-82 | 5-91 | -6 | 6 |
| Derry | 7 | 2 | 2 | 3 | 13-86 | 9-106 | -8 | 6 |
| Armagh | 7 | 2 | 2 | 3 | 4-86 | 6-96 | -16 | 6 |
| Laois | 7 | 1 | 1 | 5 | 4-93 | 11-103 | -31 | 3 |

^{1}Fermanagh, Meath, Derry and Armagh are ranked by scoring difference.

== Connacht Senior Football Championship ==
=== Fixtures ===
| Date | Round | Team 1 | Score | Team 2 | Ground |
| Sunday 5 June 2016 | Semi-final | Mayo | 0-12 - 1-12 | Galway | McHale Park |
| Sunday 10 July 2016 | Final | Galway | 0-13 - 1-10 | Roscommon | Pearse Stadium, Salthill |
| Sunday 17 July 2016 | Final replay | Galway | 3-16 - 0-14 | Roscommon | McHale Park |

=== Bracket ===
Preliminary round
New York | 0-17
Roscommon | 1-15

Quarter-finals
Roscommon | 1-21
Leitrim | 0-11
London | 0-9
Mayo | 2-16

Semi-finals
Roscommon | 4-16
Sligo | 2-13
Mayo | 0-12
Galway | 1-12

Final
Roscommon (R) | 1-10; 0-14
Galway (R) | 0-13; 3-16

== 2016 All-Ireland Senior Football Championship ==
=== Fixtures ===
| Date | Round | Team 1 | Score | Team 2 | Ground |
| Sunday 31 July 2016 | AI SFC quarter-final | Tipperary | 3-13 - 1-10 | Galway | Croke Park |
