= Clavin =

Clavin is a surname. Notable people with the surname include:

- Chris Clavin (born 1973), American musician and record label owner
- Nicholas Clavin (born 1948), Irish footballer
- Patricia Clavin, British academic
- Paul Clavin, French scientist

== See also ==
- Cliff Clavin, fictional character
- Clavin (supplement), Czech erectile dysfunction supplement
