= Colleran =

Colleran is a surname. Notable people with the surname include:

- Brendan Colleran (born 1948), Irish Gaelic football player
- Enda Colleran (1942–2004), Irish Gaelic football player and manager
- Seamus Colleran, Irish Gaelic football player
- Ger Colleran, Irish journalist
- Mandy Colleran (born 1962), British actress
- Noel Colleran (born 1944), Irish Gaelic football player
