= Tom Gilmore =

Tom Gilmore may refer to:

- Thomas R. Gilmore (1825–1899), American politician in the state of Iowa
- Tom Gilmore Sr. (1908–1994), member of the Australian House of Representatives, 1949–1951
- Tom Gilmore (prospector) (fl. 1898-1902), partner of Felix Pedro
- Tom Gilmore (North Carolina politician) (1936–2019), American politician in the state of North Carolina
- Tom Gilmore Jr. (1946–2024), Australian politician in the Queensland Legislative Assembly, 1986–1998
- Tom Gilmore (ice hockey) (born 1948), Canadian ice hockey player for the Edmonton Oilers
- Tom Gilmore (property developer) (born 1953), Californian property developer
- Tom Gilmore (American football) (born 1964), American football coach and former player
- Tom Gilmore (rugby league) (born 1994), rugby league footballer
- T. J. Gilmore (Thomas Joseph Gilmore), Irish Gaelic footballer

== See also ==
- Tommy Joe Gilmore (born 1950), footballer from County Galway
