= Derek Savage (Gaelic footballer) =

Galway Gaelic footballer

Personal information
- Native name: Derek Mac Sabhaois (Irish)
- Born: 1978 (age 47–48) Galway, Ireland
- Height: 1.75 m (5 ft 9 in)

Sport
- Sport: Gaelic football
- Position: Right corner forward
Club
- Years: Club
- 1995–2020: Cortoon Shamrocks
Inter-county
- Years: County
- 1998–2007: Galway
Inter-county titles
- Connacht titles: 6
- All-Irelands: 2
- NFL: 0
- All Stars: 1

Derek Savage is an Irish former Gaelic footballer who played at senior level for the Galway county team. He plays his club football with his local club Cortoon Shamrocks and was a member of the Galway senior team from 1998 to 2008. He is married to Caitriona since 2006.
