= Donal O'Neill =

Donal O'Neill may refer to:

- Donal O'Neill or Domhnall Ó Néill, various kings of Tír Eóghain
- Donal O'Neill (Gaelic footballer) (born 1988), Gaelic footballer for Galway
- Donal O'Neill (swimmer), Irish swimmer

== See also ==
- Dónal O'Neill (1967–2023), Irish Gaelic footballer
