= 2023 Galway county football team season =

Galway
2023 season
- Manager: Pádraic Joyce
- Stadium: Pearse Stadium, Salthill
- NFL D1: 2nd
- All-Ireland SFC: Preliminary quarter-finalist
- Connacht SFC: Winner
- FBD: Semi-finalist

The following is a summary of Galway county football team's 2023 season.

== Competitions ==
=== FBD ===
Fixtures were confirmed in October 2022.

==== Fixtures ====
6 January 2023 Quarter-final	Leitrim	1–13 (16) – (30) 3–21	Galway	Bekan
19:00 IWT (UTC±0)		(HT: 0–5 – 2–12)		Venue: Connacht GAA Centre of Excellence
		Report		Referee: A Clogher (Roscommon); Attendance: 1,200

14 January 2023 Semi-final	Mayo	2–18 (24) – (21) 3–12	Galway	Bekan
17:30 IWT (UTC±0)		(HT: 2–9 – 0–5)		Venue: Connacht GAA Centre of Excellence
		Report		Referee: B Judge (Sligo)

=== National Football League Division 1 ===
==== Table ====
Pos	Team	Pld	W	D	L	PF	PA	PD	Pts	Qualification
1	Mayo	7	4	2	1	126	102	+24	10	Advance to National League Final
2	Galway	7	4	2	1	93	91	+2	10	Advance to National League Final
3	Roscommon	7	4	0	3	105	92	+13	8	
4	Tyrone	7	4	0	3	113	110	+3	8	
5	Kerry	7	3	0	4	106	104	+2	6	
6	Monaghan	7	3	0	4	109	119	−10	6	
7	Armagh	7	2	1	4	95	98	−3	5	Relegation to 2024 NFL Division 2
8	Donegal	7	1	1	5	76	117	−41	3	Relegation to 2024 NFL Division 2

Source: GAA
Rules for classification: Tiebreakers

==== Fixtures ====
28 January 2023 Round 1	Mayo	1–11 (14) – (14) 2–8	Galway	Castlebar
				Venue: MacHale Park
	Gls: J Carr 1. Pts: R O'Donoghue 6 (4fs), M Ruane 1, D O'Connor 1, C O'Connor 1, B Tuohy 1, Flynn 1.	Report	Gls: M Tierney 1, S Kelly 1 Pts: D Comer 3 (1f, 1m), P Kelly 1, P Conroy 1, C McDaid 1, R Finnerty 1, P Cooke 1 (f).	Referee: Joe McQuillan (Cavan); Attendance: 13,654

5 February 2023 Round 2	Galway	0–8 (8) – (9) 0–9	Roscommon	Galway
14:00 IST (UTC)				Venue: Pearse Stadium
	Pts: D Conneely 3 (3fs), C McDaid 1, M Tierney 1, D McHugh 1, I Burke 1, J Heaney 1.	Report	Pts: D Murtagh 3 (1f), B O’Carroll 2, C Lennon 1, R Hughes 1, D Cregg 1.	Referee: Martin McNally (Monaghan)

19 February 2023 Round 3	Galway	0–16 (16) – (13) 0–13	Tyrone	Tuam
				Venue: Tuam Stadium
	Pts: M Tierney 6 (3f); P Conroy 3 (2f), C Sweeney 3, P Cooke 1, J Glynn 1, I Burke 1, S Kelly 1.	Report	Pts: D McCurry 5 (3f); C McShane 2 (1m); D Canavan 1 (f), C Quinn 1, C Munroe 1, R Donnelly 1, P Harte 1, P Hampsey 1.	Referee: Brendan Cawley (Kildare)

26 February 2023 Round 4	Donegal	1–9 (12) – (12) 1–9	Galway	Letterkenny
12:30 IST (UTC+1)				Venue: O'Donnell Park
	Gls: O Gallen 1 (pen). Pts: O Gallen 2; C O'Donnell 2, S Patton 1 (f), J Brennan 1, C McGonagle 1, M Langan 1, J McGee 1.	Report	Gls: M Tierney 1. Pts: M Tierney 3 (1 '45), P Conroy 2 (2f), R Finnerty 2, C Sweeney 1, P Cooke 1.	Referee: David Coldrick (Meath)

5 March 2023 Round 5	Galway	1–13 (16) – (10) 0–10	Monaghan	Salthill
				Venue: Pearse Stadium
	Gls: J Heaney 1. Pts: P Conroy 3 (2f), M Tierney 3 (2f), R Finnerty 3, P Cooke 1, J Daly 1, J Heaney 1, S Kelly 1.	Report	Pts: R Beggan 4 (4fs), S Jones 2, C McCarthy 1 (f), M Bannigan 1, D Ward 1, K Lavelle 1.	Referee: Conor Lane (Cork); Attendance: 5,275

18 March 2023 Round 6	Armagh	1–6 (9) – (11) 1–8	Galway	Armagh
				Venue: Box-It Athletic Grounds
	Gls: E Rafferty 1. Pts: C Mackin 1, S Campbell 1, C Cumiskey 1, R Grugan 1, R O'Neill 1, A Nugent 1.	Report	Gls: M Tierney 1, Pts: T Culhane 2 (2f), S Walsh 2 (1'45', 1f), J Heaney 2, P Conroy 1, C Sweeney 1.	Referee: David Gough (Meath)

26 March 2023 Round 7	Galway	1–13 (16) – (14) 0–14	Kerry	Salthill
13:45 IST (UTC+1)				Venue: Pearse Stadium
	Gls: P Conroy 1. Pts: S Walsh 5 (5fs), J Maher 2, T Culhane 1, C Sweeney 1, J Daly 1, D Comer 1, M Tierney 1, R Finnerty 1	Report	Pts: S O'Shea 5 (2fs, 2 45), D Clifford 2 (2fs), BD O'Sullivan 2, T O'Sullivan 2, P Clifford 2, G White 1.	Referee: Niall Cullen (Fermanagh)

TG4

2 April 2023
16:00 IST (UTC+1)
NFL Final

Report

Mayo	0–14 (14) – (11) 0–11	Galway
(HT: 0–8 – 0–5)
Pts: R O'Donoghue 7 (5fs, 2mks), C Reape 3 (2fs, 45), J Carr 1, P Durcan 1, J Flynn 1, J Coyne 1		Pts: S Walsh 5 (2fs, 1 45), R Finnerty 2 (1mk), S Kelly 1, J Maher 1, P Cooke 1, T Culhane 1

Croke Park, Dublin
Referee: Brendan Cawley (Kildare)
Attendance: 45,041

=== Connacht Senior Football Championship ===
==== Bracket ====
Quarter-finals

Semi-finals

Final

London
0-12

Sligo
2-20

Sligo
2-16

New York
0-06

New York
0-15 (2)

Leitrim
0-15 (0)

Sligo
0-12

Galway
2-20

Roscommon
2-08

Mayo
0-10

Roscommon
1-09

Galway
1-13

==== Fixtures ====
23 April 2023; 16:00; Semi-final	Roscommon	1–9 – 1–13	Galway	Dr Hyde Park, Roscommon; Attendance: 16,917; Referee: David Gough (Meath); Man of the Match: Ciarán Murtagh
23 April 2023; 16:00; Semi-final		Report		Dr Hyde Park, Roscommon; Attendance: 16,917; Referee: David Gough (Meath); Man of the Match: Ciarán Murtagh

7 May 2023; 13:45; Final	Sligo	0–12 – 2–20	Galway	McHale Park, Castlebar; Attendance: 11,867; Referee: Brendan Cawley (Kildare); Man of the Match: Matthew Tierney
7 May 2023; 13:45; Final		Report		McHale Park, Castlebar; Attendance: 11,867; Referee: Brendan Cawley (Kildare); Man of the Match: Matthew Tierney

=== All-Ireland Senior Football Championship ===
Galway were drawn into Group 2.

==== Table ====
Pos	Team	Pld	W	D	L	PF	PA	PD	Pts	Qualification
1	Armagh	3	2	0	1	43	43	0	4 (Note: Armagh are ranked ahead of Galway as they won the head-to-head game between the teams.)	Advance to quarter-final
2	Galway	3	2	0	1	51	41	+10	4	Advance to preliminary quarter-final
3	Tyrone	3	1	1	1	44	45	−1	3	Advance to preliminary quarter-final
4	Westmeath	3	0	1	2	45	54	−9	1	

Updated to match(es) played on 18 June 2023. Source: GAA

==== Fixtures ====
20 May 2023 Round 1	Galway	0–16 – 0–13	Tyrone	Galway
17:15 IST (UTC+1)	Shane Walsh 0–6 (0–4f), Cillian McDaid 0–2, Paul Conroy 0–2, Peter Cooke 0–2, Matthew Tierney 0–1, Johnny Heaney 0–1, Damien Comer 0–1, Robert Finnerty 0–1	Report	Darren McCurry 0–7 (0–5f), Darragh Canavan 0–2 (0–2f), Conor Meyler 0–1, Cormac Quinn 0–1, Peter Harte 0–1, Mattie Donnelly 0–1	Stadium: Pearse Stadium; Referee: David Gough (Meath)

3 June 2023 Round 2	Westmeath	0–12 – 0–20	Galway	Mullingar
17:00 IST (UTC+1)	John Heslin 0–2 (0–1f), Ronan O'Toole 0–2, Luke Loughlin 0–2, Jack Smith 0–1, Ronan Wallace 0–1, Ray Connellan 0–1, Sam McCartan 0–1, Stephen Smith 0–1, Eoin Mulvihill 0–1	Report	Shane Walsh 0–4 (0–3f), Peter Cooke 0–4, Damien Comer 0–3, Johnny Heaney 0–2 (0–1m), Cian Hernon 0–2, Matthew Tierney 0–1 (0–1 '45), Paul Conroy 0–1, Cathal Sweeney 0–1, Ian Burke 0–1, John Maher 0–1	Stadium: TEG Cusack Park; Referee: Joe McQuillan (Cavan)

18 June 2023 Round 3	Galway	1–12 – 0–16	Armagh	Carrick-on-Shannon
16:00 IST (UTC+1)	Shane Walsh 0–5 (0–3f), Seán Kelly 1–1, Cillian McDaid 0–2, Matthew Tierney 0–2, Peter Cooke 0–2	Report	Rory Grugan 0–4 (0–3f), Conor Turbitt 0–4 (0–2f), Andrew Murnin 0–3 (0–1m), Aidan Forker 0–2, Stefan Campbell 0–2, Jason Duffy 0–1	Stadium: Avant Money Páirc Seán Mac Diarmada; Attendance: 6,803; Referee: Joe McQuillan (Cavan)

Galway advanced to a preliminary quarter-final against Mayo.

25 June 2023 Preliminary quarter-final	Galway	0–12 – 1–10	Mayo	Galway
15:00 IST (UTC+1)	Shane Walsh 0–4 (0–4f), Matthew Tierney 0–2 (0–1f), John Maher 0–2, Paul Conroy 0–1, Cillian McDaid 0–1, Peter Cooke 0–1, Damien Comer 0–1	Report	Ryan O'Donoghue 0–3 (0–1f), David McBrien 1–0, Paddy Durcan 0–2, Tommy Conroy 0–2, Stephen Coen 0–1, Kevin McLoughlin 0–1, Cillian O'Connor 0–1	Stadium: Pearse Stadium; Attendance: 23,897; Referee: Sean Hurson (Tyrone)
