= 2021 Galway county football team season =

Galway
2021 season
- Manager: Pádraic Joyce
- Stadium: Pearse Stadium, Salthill
- NFL D1 South: 3rd (relegated)
- All-Ireland SFC: Did not compete
- Connacht SFC: Finalist

The following is a summary of Galway county football team's 2021 season.

== Competitions ==
=== FBD ===
There was no FBD Insurance League in 2021 due to the impact of the COVID-19 pandemic on Gaelic games.

=== National Football League Division 1 South ===
The National League was split into North and South Divisions, also because of the COVID-19 pandemic, and Galway played the season in Division 1 South.

==== Table ====
Pos	Team	Pld	W	D	L	PF	PA	PD	Pts	Qualification
1	Kerry (C)	3	2	1	0	75	47	+28	5	Advance to NFL semi-finals
2	Dublin (C)	3	2	1	0	68	55	+13	5	Advance to NFL semi-finals
3	Galway (R)	3	1	0	2	51	71	−20	2	Advance to Division 1 relegation playoffs; two losers are relegated to Division 2
4	Roscommon (R)	3	0	0	3	47	68	−21	0	Advance to Division 1 relegation playoffs; two losers are relegated to Division 2

Updated to match(es) played on 30 May 2021. Source: GAA.ie
Rules for classification: Tiebreakers
(C) NFL champions (shared); (R) Relegated

==== Fixtures ====
15 May 2021 1	Kerry	4-21 (33) – (11) 0-11	Galway	Tralee
15:00				Venue: Austin Stack Park
				Referee: Conor Lane (Cork)

23 May 2021 2	Galway	2–16 (22) – (16) 1–13	Roscommon	Salthill
14:00				Venue: Pearse Stadium
				Referee: David Coldrick (Meath)

TG4

13 June 2021
15:45 IST (UTC+1)
Relegation play-off

Monaghan	1-21 (24) – (23) 2-17 (a.e.t.)	Galway

St Tiernach's Park, Clones
Referee: David Gough (Meath)

=== Connacht Senior Football Championship ===
==== Bracket ====
Quarter-finals
Mayo	3-23
Sligo	0-12

Semi-finals
Leitrim	0-11
Mayo	5-20
Galway	2-11
Roscommon	0-12

Final
Mayo	2-14
Galway	2-8

==== Fixtures ====
4 July 2021; 13:15; Semi-final	Galway (1)	2-11 - 0-12	Roscommon (1)	Dr Hyde Park, Roscommon; Attendance: 1,049; Referee: Joe McQuillan (Cavan); Man of the Match: Matthew Tierney (Oughterard)
4 July 2021; 13:15; Semi-final	Matthew Tierney 1-3 (0-2f, 1 '45), Paul Kelly 1-2, Robert Finnerty and Shane Walsh (0-2f) 0-2 each, Seán Kelly and Damien Comer 0-1 each		Enda Smith 0-3, Conor Daly and Donie Smith (1 '45) 0-2 each, Brian Stack, Conor Hussey, Ciarán Murtagh (0-1f), Diarmuid Murtagh, Cathal Cregg 0-1 each	Dr Hyde Park, Roscommon; Attendance: 1,049; Referee: Joe McQuillan (Cavan); Man of the Match: Matthew Tierney (Oughterard)

25 July 2021; 13:30; Final	Mayo	2-14 - 2-8	Galway	Croke Park, Dublin; Attendance: 18,000; Referee: Conor Lane (Cork); Man of the Match: Matthew Ruane (Breaffy)
25 July 2021; 13:30; Final	Ryan O'Donoghue 1-3 (1-0 pen, 0-2f), Matthew Ruane 1-2, Conor Loftus and Tommy Conroy 0-2 each, Rob Hennelly (1 '45), Paddy Durcan, Darren McHale, Kevin McLoughlin, James Carr 0-1 each		Shane Walsh 1-1, Matthew Tierney 0-4 (0-3f), Damien Comer 1-0, Paul Conroy 0-2, Cathal Sweeney 0-1	Croke Park, Dublin; Attendance: 18,000; Referee: Conor Lane (Cork); Man of the Match: Matthew Ruane (Breaffy)

=== All-Ireland Senior Football Championship ===
Due to the impact of the COVID-19 pandemic on Gaelic games, there was no back-door route into the All-Ireland Championship. Therefore, because Galway did not win the Connacht Championship, they did not qualify for the 2021 All-Ireland Championship.
