= Jimmy Duggan =

Jimmy Duggan may refer to:

- Jimmy Duggan (Gaelic footballer) (born 1948), Irish Gaelic footballer
- Jimmy Duggan (hurler) (born 1930), Irish hurler
- Jimmy Duggan (jockey) (born 1964), English jockey
