= 2020 Galway county football team season =

Galway
2020 season
- Manager: Pádraic Joyce
- Stadium: Pearse Stadium, Salthill
- NFL D1: 3rd
- All-Ireland SFC: Did not compete
- Connacht SFC: Finalist
- FBD: Winner

The following is a summary of Galway county football team's 2020 season. The season was suspended in March 2020 due to the COVID-19 pandemic. The season resumed in mid-October of the same year.

== Competitions ==
=== FBD ===
Fixtures were confirmed in November 2019.

==== Fixtures ====
12 January 2020 Semi-final	Mayo	1-17 (20) – (20) 1-17 (2–3 pen)	Galway	Castlebar
14:00 GMT (UTC±0)		(HT: 0-9 – 0-8)		Venue: MacHale Park
		Report		Referee: P. Guckian (Leitrim); Attendance: 7,000
		Penalty shootout
	Fergal Boland ✗ Liam Irwin; Kevin McLoughlin; Gary Boylan ✗ Brian Walsh ✗		Shane Walsh; ✗ Paul Conroy; Damien Comer; ✗ Adrian Varley; Tom Flynn

18 January 2020 Final	Roscommon	0-11 (11) – (17) 1-14	Galway	Roscommon
14:00 GMT (UTC±0)		(HT: 0-5 – 0-7)		Venue: Dr Hyde Park
	Pts: Ciarán Lennon 5 (3f), Donie Smith 2 (1f), Niall Kilroy 1, Richard Hughes 1, Andrew Glennon 1, Cathal Cregg 1	Report	Gls: Shane Walsh 1 (pen); Pts: Shane Walsh 8 (6f, 1 mark), Paul Conroy 2, Robert Finnerty 2, Michael Boyle 1, Seán Mulkerrin 1	Referee: Jerome Henry (Mayo); Attendance: 3,217

=== National Football League Division 2 ===
The league was originally scheduled to end in March 2020, but the public health measures introduced to combat the spread of the COVID-19 pandemic resulted in the final two league rounds being delayed to October.

==== Table ====
Pos	Team	Pld	W	D	L	PF	PA	PD	Pts	Qualification
1	Kerry (C)	7	5	1	1	133	112	+21	11	National Football League champions
2	Dublin	7	4	2	1	126	112	+14	10	
3	Galway	7	4	0	3	128	127	+1	8 (Note: Head-to-head result: Galway 2-25 – 0-12 Tyrone.)	
4	Tyrone	7	4	0	3	109	126	−17	8	
5	Donegal	7	3	1	3	117	109	+8	7	
6	Monaghan	7	2	2	3	113	114	−1	6	
7	Mayo (R)	7	2	1	4	122	123	−1	5	Relegation to 2021 NFL Division 2
8	Meath (R)	7	0	1	6	103	128	−25	1	Relegation to 2021 NFL Division 2

Updated to match(es) played on 24 October 2020. Source: GAA.ie
Rules for classification: 1) League points 2) Where only two teams are involved, the outcome of the meeting of the two teams in the competition 3) Scoring Difference 4) Highest Total Score For 5) A Play-Off.
(C) League champions; (R) Relegated

==== Fixtures ====
26 January 2020 1	Galway	1-14 (17) – (16) 0-16	Monaghan	Salthill
14:30 GMT (UTC+0)				Venue: Pearse Stadium
		Report		Referee: Maurice Deegan (Laois)

1 February 2020 2	Kerry	1-15 (18) – (17) 2-11	Galway	Tralee
19:00 GMT (UTC+0)				Venue: Austin Stack Park
		Report		Referee: Anthony Nolan (Wicklow)

9 February 2020 3	Donegal	2-07 (13) – (14) 2-08	Galway	Letterkenny
15:00 GMT (UTC+0)				Venue: O'Donnell Park
		Report		Referee: Joe McQuillan (Cavan)

23 February 2020 4	Galway	2-25 (31) – (12) 0-12	Tyrone	Salthill
14:00 GMT (UTC+0)				Venue: Pearse Stadium
				Referee: Conor Lane (Cork)

1 March 2020 5	Meath	1-12 (15) – (17) 1-14	Galway	Navan
14:30 GMT (UTC+0)				Venue: Páirc Tailteann
				Referee: Niall Cullen (Fermanagh)

18 October 2020 6	Galway	0-17 (17) – (32) 3-23	Mayo	Salthill
14:00 IST (UTC+1)				Venue: Pearse Stadium
				Referee: Maurice Deegan (Laois); TV: TG4

25 October 2020 7	Galway	0-15 (15) – (21) 2-15	Dublin	Salthill
14:00 GMT (UTC+0)				Venue: Pearse Stadium
				Referee: David Coldrick (Meath); TV: TG4

=== Connacht Senior Football Championship ===
On 17 March, the GAA confirmed that the opening fixture – due to have taken place at Gaelic Park in The Bronx on 3 May – had been postponed due to the impact of the COVID-19 pandemic on Gaelic games. The Galway vs Sligo Connacht SFC semi-final was not played as Sligo were affected by COVID-19 cases. As a result, Galway advanced to the provincial final without playing a single match for the first time since 1965. So Galway's first (and, as it turned out, last) match was the Connacht SFC final. The Connacht SFC had only four teams instead of the usual seven. This previously only ever happened during the period when all Connacht SFC finals were between Galway and Mayo (1933–1940), and again in 1965.

Since 2020 been postponed of hosting Sligo they hosted them in the 2023 Connacht final and Connacht semi-final in 2024 and New York in 2025.

==== Bracket ====
Quarter-finals
Mayo	2-15
Leitrim	0-10

Semi-finals
Galway	w/o
Sligo	conc
Roscommon	0-13
Mayo	1-16

Final
Galway	0-13
Mayo	0-14

==== Fixtures ====
1 November 2020 Quarter-final	Galway	w/o – conc	New York	New York
				Venue: Gaelic Park

7 November 2020 Semi-final	Galway	w/o – conc	Sligo	Galway
				Venue: Pearse Stadium

RTÉ

15 November 2020
13:30 GMT (UTC+0)
Final

Report

Galway	0-13 (13) – (14) 0-14	Mayo
(HT: 0-5 - 0-8)
Pts: S Walsh 7 (4f), P Conroy 3, D Conneely 1, P Kelly 1, G O'Donnell 1.		Pts: C O'Connor 4 (2f), T Conroy 3, M Ruane 2, B Walsh 2, P Durcan 1, D O'Connor 1, R O'Donoghue 1.

Pearse Stadium, Galway
Referee: Sean Hurson (Tyrone)
Attendance: 0

=== All-Ireland Senior Football Championship ===
Due to the impact of the COVID-19 pandemic on Gaelic games, there was no back-door route into the All-Ireland Championship. Therefore, because Galway did not win the Connacht Championship, they did not qualify for the 2020 All-Ireland Championship.
