= Kieran Claffey =

Irish Gaelic footballer (1949–1995)

Personal information
- Native name: Ciarán Mac Laithimh (Irish)
- Born: 15 April 1949 Ballinahown, County Westmeath, Ireland
- Died: 19 September 1995 (aged 46) Moate, County Westmeath, Ireland
- Occupations: Farmer, publican
- Height: 6 ft 0 in (183 cm)

Sport
- Sport: Gaelic football
- Position: Midfield
Clubs
- Years: Club
- Doon; Clontibret O'Neills
Club titles
- Monaghan titles: 1
Inter-county
Years	County	Apps (scores)
1969–1975	Offaly	14
Inter-county titles
- Leinster titles: 2
- All-Irelands: 1
- NFL: 0
- All Stars: 0

Kieran Claffey (15 April 1949 – 19 September 1995) was an Irish Gaelic footballer who played for club sides Doon and Clontibret O'Neills. He was also a member of the Offaly senior football team.

== Career ==
Claffey never played Gaelic football in organised competitions at primary or secondary school level. As an agricultural college student in County Monaghan he joined the Clontibret O'Neills club and won a Monaghan SFC title in 1968. Claffey later returned to the Doon club and won an Offaly JFC title in 1970.

Claffey, having never lined out in the minor grade, first played for Offaly as a member of the under-21 team in 1970. By this stage, Claffey had already joined the senior team. He partnered Willie Bryan at midfield when Offaly defeated Galway in the 1971 All-Ireland SFC final. Claffey's inter-county career ended in 1975, by which stage he had also won two Leinster SFC medals.

== Death ==
Claffey died from a kidney-related illness on 19 September 1995, at the age of 46.

== Honours ==
Clontibret O'Neill's

- Monaghan Senior Football Championship: 1968

Doon

- Offaly Junior A Football Championship: 1970

Offaly

- All-Ireland Senior Football Championship: 1971
- Leinster Senior Football Championship: 1969, 1971, 1973
