= 2022 Galway county football team season =

Galway
2022 season
- Manager: Pádraic Joyce
- Stadium: Pearse Stadium, Salthill
- NFL D2: 2nd (promoted)
- All-Ireland SFC: Finalist
- Connacht SFC: Winner
- FBD: Winner

The following is a summary of Galway county football team's 2022 season.

== Competitions ==
=== FBD ===
==== Fixtures ====
7 January 2022 Semi-final	Mayo	0–13 (13) – (17) 0–17	Galway	Bekan
18:00 GMT (UTC±0)		(HT: 0–7 – 0–10)		Venue: Connacht GAA Centre of Excellence
				Referee: John Gilmartin (Sligo)

14 January 2022 Final	Galway	1–18 (21) – (19) 1–16	Roscommon	Bekan
17:45 GMT (UTC±0)		(HT: 1–6 – 0–10)		Venue: Connacht GAA Centre of Excellence
				Referee: John Gilmartin (Sligo)

=== National Football League Division 2 ===
==== Table ====
Pos	Team	Pld	W	D	L	PF	PA	PD	Pts	Qualification
1	Roscommon	7	5	2	0	123	87	+36	12	Advance to NFL Division 2 Final and promotion to 2023 NFL Division 1
2	Galway	7	6	0	1	141	100	+41	12	Advance to NFL Division 2 Final and promotion to 2023 NFL Division 1
3	Derry	7	5	1	1	110	82	+28	11	
4	Meath	7	2	2	3	93	111	−18	6	
5	Clare	7	2	2	3	88	87	+1	6	
6	Cork	7	2	1	4	112	138	−26	5	
7	Offaly	7	1	1	5	98	133	−35	3	Relegation to 2023 NFL Division 3
8	Down	7	0	1	6	78	115	−37	1	Relegation to 2023 NFL Division 3

Updated to match(es) played on 27 March 2022. Source: GAA.ie
Rules for classification: Tiebreakers

==== Fixtures ====
30 January 2022 Round 1	Galway	1–14 (17) – (6) 0–6	Meath	Salthill
14:00 GMT (UTC+0)				Venue: Pearse Stadium
		Report		Referee: Patrick Maguire (Longford)

5 February 2022 Round 2	Down	0–9 (9) – (15) 1–12	Galway	Newry
				Venue: Páirc Esler
		Report		Referee: Brendan Cawley (Kildare)

6 March 2022 Round 3	Galway	2–17 (23) – (19) 3–10	Offaly	Salthill
14:00 GMT (UTC+0)				Venue: Pearse Stadium
		Report		Referee: David Murnane (Cork)

26 February 2022 Round 4	Cork	2–17 (23) – (31) 3–22	Galway	Cork
17:00 IST (UTC+1)				Venue: Páirc Uí Chaoimh
		Report		Referee: Cormac Reilly (Meath)

13 March 2022 Round 5	Galway	2–8 (14) – (8) 1–5	Clare	Salthill
14:00 IST (UTC+1)				Venue: Pearse Stadium
		Report		Referee: Conor Lane (Cork)

20 March 2022 Round 6	Derry	0–12 (12) – (23) 4–11	Galway	Owenbeg
13:00 IST (UTC+1)				Venue: Owenbeg Derry GAA Centre
		Report

27 March 2022 Round 7	Roscommon	1–20 (23) – (18) 1–15	Galway	Roscommon
14:00 IST (UTC+1)				Venue: Dr Hyde Park

3 April 2022
Division 2 Final

Roscommon	1–20 (23) – 0–22 (22)	Galway

Croke Park, Drumcondra, Dublin
Referee: Niall Cullen (Fermanagh) (Fermanagh)
Attendance: 31,506

=== Connacht Senior Football Championship ===
==== Bracket ====
Quarter-finals
Mayo	0–16
Galway	1–14
London	2–11
Leitrim	3–12
New York	0–15
Sligo	1–16

Semi-finals
Galway	4–20
Leitrim	0–09
Sligo	0–11
Roscommon	0–23

Final
Galway	2–19
Roscommon	2–16

==== Fixtures ====
24 April 2022
Quarter-final

Mayo	0–16 - 1–14	Galway
Cillian O'Connor 0-6f, Ryan O'Donoghue 0-4 (0-1m), James Carr 0-2, Lee Keegan, Eoghan McLaughlin, Diarmuid O'Connor, Kevin McLoughlin 0-1 each	Report	Shane Walsh 0-5 (0-3f, 2 '45), Johnny Heaney 1-1, Paul Conroy 0-3, Kieran Molloy, Niall Daly, Robert Finnerty, Damien Comer, Cillian McDaid 0-1 each

MacHale Park, Castlebar
Attendance: 24,557
Referee: David Coldrick (Meath)
8 May 2022
Semi-final

Galway	4–20 - 0–9	Leitrim
	Report

Pearse Stadium, Galway
Attendance: 4,749
Referee: Paul Faloon (Down)
29 May 2022
Final

Galway	2–19 - 2–16	Roscommon
Shane Walsh 1-6 (1f, 245s), Rob Finnerty 0-5, Patrick Kelly 1-0, Damien Comer 0-3, Johnny Heaney 0-2, Kieran Molloy, Cillian McDaid, and Paul Conroy 0-1 each.	Report	Conor Cox 0-5 (3fs), Conor Daly and Diarmuid Murtagh (1f) 1-1 each, Ultan Harney 0-3, Donie Smith 0-2 (1f), Ciaráin Murtagh, Cian McKeon, Cathal Heneghan, and Enda Smith 0-1 each.

Pearse Stadium, Galway
Attendance: 21,419
Referee: Joe McQuillan (Cavan)

=== All-Ireland Senior Football Championship ===
Galway advanced to the 2022 All-Ireland SFC quarter-finals.

==== Bracket ====
Quarter-finals; 25/26 June
Galway (p)	2–21(4)
Armagh	3–18(1)
Derry	5–13
Clare	2–8
Dublin	0–21
Cork	0–10
Kerry	1–18
Mayo	0–13

Semi-finals; 9/10 July
Galway	2–8
Derry	1–6
Dublin	1–13
Kerry	1–14

Final; 24 July
Galway	0–16
Kerry	0–20

==== Fixtures ====
26 June 2022
13:45
Quarter-final
Galway
2–21 (27) – (27) 3–18 (a.e.t.)
(4–1 pen)
Armagh
Croke Park, Dublin
Attendance: 71,353
Referee: David Coldrick (Meath)
Man of the Match: Cillian McDaid
Shane Walsh 0–6 (0-5f), Cillian McDaid 1–2, Robert Finnerty 0–4, Johnny Heaney 1–0, Damien Comer 0–3, Matthew Tierney 0–2, Patrick Kelly 0–1, Finnian O Laoi 0–1, Kieran Molloy 0–1, Paul Conroy 0–1.

Penalty kicks
Shane Walsh
Damien Comer
Robert Finnerty
Matthew Tierney

Report
Rory Grugan 1–3 (0-2f), Aidan Nugent 1–2 (0-1m), Conor Turbitt 1–1, Rian O'Neill 0–4 (0-3f), Stefan Campbell 0–3, Jarlath Óg Burns 0–1, Conor O'Neill 0–1, Eoin Woods 0–1, Jemar Hall 0–1, Justin Kieran 0–1.

Penalty kicks
Stefan Campbell
Rian O'Neill
Conor Turbitt

There was no semi-final draw as the pairings were arranged by rota.

9 July 2022; 17:30; Semi-final	Galway	2–8 (14) – (9) 1–6	Derry	Croke Park, Dublin; Attendance: 68,830; Referee: Brendan Cawley (Kildare); Man of the Match: Damien Comer
9 July 2022; 17:30; Semi-final	Damien Comer 2–2, Shane Walsh 0–4 (0-3f and 0–1 45), John Daly and Johnny Heaney 0–1 each	Report	Lachlan Murray 1–0, Shane McGuigan 0–3 (0-2f), Brendan Rogers 0–2, Niall Loughlin 0–1	Croke Park, Dublin; Attendance: 68,830; Referee: Brendan Cawley (Kildare); Man of the Match: Damien Comer

RTÉ
Sky Sports

24 July 2022
15:30 IST (UTC+1)
Final

Report

Galway	0–16 – 0–20	Kerry
(HT: 0–08 – 0–07)
Pts: Shane Walsh 9 (4f, 1 '45), Cillian McDaid 4, Jack Glynn 1, Kieran Molloy 1, Johnny Heaney 1		Pts: David Clifford 8 (3f, 2 mark), Seán O'Shea 3 (3f), Paudie Clifford 2, Killian Spillane 2, Graham O’Sullivan 1, Paul Geaney 1 (1 mark), Diarmuid O'Connor 1, Stephen O’Brien 1, Gavin White 1

Croke Park, Dublin
Referee: Sean Hurson (Tyrone)
Attendance: 82,300
Standby: Paddy Neilan (Roscommon)
Linesman: Barry Cassidy (Derry)
Sideline: Sean Laverty (Antrim)
Umpires: Mark Coney (Ardboe O'Donovan Rossa), Mel Taggart (Clonoe O'Rahilly's), Cathal Forbes (Ardboe O'Donovan Rossa), Martin Conway (Moortown St Malachy's)
