= Paddy Fenning =

Offaly Gaelic footballer (1950–2020)

Personal information
- Native name: Páidí Ó Fionnáin (Irish)
- Born: 25 June 1950 Tullamore, County Offaly, Ireland
- Died: 15 May 2020 (aged 69) Tullamore, County Offaly, Ireland
- Occupation: Sales manager
- Height: 5 ft 10 in (178 cm)

Sport
- Sport: Gaelic football
- Position: Left corner-forward
Club
- Years: Club
- Tullamore
Club titles
- Offaly titles: 2
Inter-county*
Years	County	Apps (scores)
1969–1980	Offaly	32 (1–22)
Inter-county titles
- Leinster titles: 4
- All-Irelands: 2
- NFL: 0
- All Stars: 0
- *Inter County team apps and scores correct as of 18:41, 15 May 2020.

Patrick Fenning (25 June 1950 – 15 May 2020) was an Irish Gaelic footballer. At club level he had success with Tullamore and was a two-time All-Ireland Senior Football Championship winner with the Offaly county team.

== Playing career ==
Fenning's inter-county career with Offaly began at underage level and saw him claim Leinster Under-21 Championship medals in 1968 and 1971. He made his senior debut in 1970 in a tournament game played at Wembley Stadium and won his first All-Ireland Championship the following year after coming on as a substitute in the final against Galway. Fenning claimed a second successive winners' medal in 1972 after scoring a goal from 50 yards in the All-Ireland final replay defeat of Kerry. Fenning's 11-season career with the Offaly senior team ended after an All-Ireland semi-final defeat by Kerry in 1980, by which stage he had made a combined total of 91 League and Championship appearances and also claimed four Leinster Championships. He was also selected for the Leinster inter-provincial team, claiming a Railway Cup medal in 1974, and won county senior championship medals in 1973 and 1977 with Tullamore.

== Late life and death ==
In retirement from playing, Fenning became heavily involved in fund-raising for local causes. He was named Offaly Person of the Year in 2011 in recognition of his management of a number of projects, among them helping erase the debt on Tullamore's GAA social centre; raising €200,000 to purchase a CT scanner for the local hospital as well as supporting an arts centre and municipally owned swimming pool in Tullamore.

Fenning died aged 69 on 15 May 2020, having been diagnosed with motor neuron disease the previous year. He was survived by his wife Kathryn and two children.

== Honours ==
Tullamore

- Offaly Senior Football Championship (2): 1973, 1977

Offaly

- All-Ireland Senior Football Championship (2): 1971, 1972
- Leinster Senior Football Championship (4): 1971, 1972, 1973, 1980
- Leinster Under-21 Football Championship (2): 1968, 1971

Leinster

- Railway Cup (1): 1974
