= Armagh-Galway Gaelic football rivalry =

Sports rivalry in Ireland

Armagh-Galway
- Location: County Armagh; County Galway
- Teams: Armagh; Galway
- First meeting: 2001
- Latest meeting: 2024

Statistics
- Total meetings: 7
- Most wins: Galway (4)
- Largest victory: 6 points (Galway - 2013)

The Armagh-Galway Gaelic football rivalry refers to the rivalry between Armagh and Galway in Gaelic football.

Whilst championship games between the two sides have been rare until recently, they have been noted for their high drama and intense gameplay.

Galway is considered a dual county, with a prestigious history in both football and hurling, whilst football dominates in Armagh.

Galway are the most successful county in Connacht in terms of both provincial and All-Ireland titles won, whilst Armagh are the fourth-ranked team in Ulster in respect of both criteria.

== Championship meetings ==
The two sides first met in the All-Ireland Championship in 2001 in round three of the qualifiers. Since then, they have met on six further occasions, most recently in the 2024 All-Ireland Senior Football Championship Final.

Galway win
Armagh win
Match was a draw

No.	Date	Winners	Score	Runners-up	Venue	Stage
1.	7 July 2001	Galway	0-13 - 0-12	Armagh	Croke Park	Round 3 Qualifier
2.	20 July 2013	Galway	1-11 - 0-9	Armagh	Pearse Stadium	Round 3 Qualifier
3.	12 July 2015	Galway	1-12 - 0-12	Armagh	Athletic Grounds	Round 2 Qualifier
4.	26 June 2022	Galway	2-21 - 3-18 (4-1 penalties)	Armagh	Croke Park	All-Ireland Quarter Final
5.	18 June 2023	Armagh	0-16 - 1-12	Galway	Carrick-on-Shannon	All-Ireland Group Stage
6.	16 June 2024	Armagh	1-12 - 0-15	Galway	Markievicz Park	All-Ireland Group Stage
7.	28 July 2024	Armagh	1-11 - 0-13	Galway	Croke Park	All-Ireland Final
