= Billy Joyce =

Irish Gaelic footballer (1950–2025)

Personal information
- Native name: Liam Seoige (Irish)
- Born: 1949 Tuam, County Galway, Ireland
- Died: 12 March 2025 (aged 75) Galway, Ireland
- Height: 5 ft 11 in (180 cm)

Sport
- Sport: Gaelic football
- Position: Midfield
Club
- Years: Club
- Killererin
Club titles
- Galway titles: 2
- Connacht titles: 2
Inter-county
- Years: County
- 1969-1984: Galway
Inter-county titles
- Connacht titles: 8
- All-Irelands: 0
- NFL: 1
- All Stars: 0

William Joyce (1949 – 12 March 2025) was an Irish Gaelic football player and manager. At club level, he played with Killererin and at inter-county level with the Galway senior football team. Joyce later served as manager at club and county levels.

== Playing career ==
At club level, Joyce played with Killererin. After playing very little Gaelic football at juvenile and underage levels, he progressed to the club's adult team and won a Galway JFC title in 1968. Joyce later claimed Galway SFC medals in 1976 and 1978, with both of those victories being converted into Connacht Club SFC title.

At inter-county level, Joyce was overlooked for Galway's minor team. He won a Connacht JFC medal in 1969, before later lining out with the under-21 team. Joyce made his senior team debut in a Gael Linn tournament match in 1969. He was a mainstay of the team for the next 15 years and won eight Connacht SFC medals, as well as captaining the team on two occasions. Joyce was one of a number of Galway players who lost three All-Ireland finals in four seasons - 1971, 1973, 1974. He won a National League medal in 1981, before lining out in a fourth All-Ireland final defeat in 1983.

== Management career ==
Joyce's inter-county career had only ended when he became involved in inter-county management. He managed Galway's junior team to the All-Ireland JFC title in 1985, following a 4-17 to 0-04 defeat of Warwickshire in the final. He served as Galway's senior team manager for three years, during which time they won the Connacht SFC title in 1987. Joyce also served as manager at club level and guided Killererin to the Galway SFC title in 2004.

== Death ==
Joyce died in Galway on 12 March 2025, at the age of 75.

== Honours ==
=== Player ===
Killererin

- Connacht Senior Club Football Championship: 1976, 1978
- Galway Senior Football Championship: 1976, 1978
- Galway Junior Football Championship: 1968

Galway

- Connacht Senior Football Championship: 1970, 1971, 1973, 1974, 1976, 1982, 1983, 1984
- National Football League: 1980–81
- Connacht Junior Football Championship: 1969

=== Management ===
Killererin

- Galway Senior Football Championship: 2004

Galway

- Connacht Senior Football Championship: 1987
- All-Ireland Junior Football Championship: 1985
- Connacht Junior Football Championship: 1985

Sporting positions
Preceded by Liam Sammon	Galway senior football team captain 1977	Succeeded by Jimmy Duggan
Preceded by Jimmy Duggan	Galway senior football team captain 1979–1980	Succeeded by Barry Brennan
Preceded by Cyril Dunne	Galway senior football team manager 1986–1989	Succeeded by Johnny Tobin
