= Cortoon Shamrocks GAA =

Gaelic sports club in County Galway, Ireland

Cortoon Shamrocks
- Seamroige Cortúin
- Founded: 1888
- County: Galway
- Nickname: The Shamrocks
- Colours: Sky Blue and White
- Grounds: Cortoon GAA Grounds/Brownsgrove
- Coordinates: 573:34653°33′53.47″N 8°47′55.87″W

Playing kits
Standard colours

Cortoon Shamrocks (Irish: Seamroige Cortúin) is a Gaelic games club based in County Galway, Ireland. It is a member of the Galway GAA branch of the Gaelic Athletic Association. Galway league and championships and they compete at all levels of Galway football.

== History ==
Cortoon are one of the oldest clubs in the county, and are unique in that they are the second senior football team in the one parish in Galway. Cortoon is a half parish of Tuam and with Tuam Stars, Cortoon success is hard come by. They achieved Senior status in the early seventies in a team powered by Tommy Joe Gilmore and Mickey Rooney, they reached the semi-final on two occasions, losing to Caltra and Milltown. They then dropped again from senior status twice, but successfully fought to regain senior status. Cortoon is a half-parish of Tuam.

2008 proved to be a memorable year in the history of Cortoon football. In the 2008 Galway Senior Football Championship, Cortoon started strongly by knocking out Annaghdown in the first round. Following that, they stunned reigning champions Killererin, winning by a scoreline of 3-09 to 0-07. Taking confidence from such a great performance, Cortoon went on to defeat 2006 All-Ireland Club champions Salthill–Knocknacarra by one point and in the club's third ever county semi final, they beat a highly fancied NUIG team by the same margin. They had reached their first ever Senior Football Final, and played Corofin in the decider. However, experience won through for Corofin as they won by 3 points in a tight contested final, 0-08 to 0-05.

Notable players include Derek Savage, former member of the county panel and a key part of Galway's 1998 and 2001 All-Ireland Football triumphs, and Michael Martin, All-Ireland Minor medal winner with Galway in 2007. Past legends include Tommy Joe Gilmore, voted centre half-back on the Galway "Team Of The Millennium". Also Cathal Mulryan, Paul and Adrian Varley who all won the 2013 u21 All Ireland Final with Galway

== Notable players ==
- Tommy Joe Gilmore (Winner of Six Connacht Senior Football Championships)
- Donal O'Neill (Played with Galway 2008–2014)
- Derek Savage (Winner of Two All-Ireland Senior Football Championships & Six Connacht Senior Football Championships)
- T. J. Gilmore (a member of the set of Galway players who lost three All-Ireland finals in four years)

== Honours ==
- Galway Intermediate Football Championship (3) (1999, 2003 2020)
- Galway Senior Football Championship (0): (finalists in 2008)
- Galway Senior Football League (1): 2009
- Galway Senior Football League B(1): 2011
- John Dunne Cup (1): 2010
