= Cork–Galway Gaelic football rivalry =

Sports rivalry in Ireland

Cork-Galway
- Location: County Cork; County Galway
- Teams: Cork; Galway
- First meeting: Cork 3-4 - 0-2 Galway; 1911 All-Ireland semi-final (3 December 1911)
- Latest meeting: Cork 1-17 - 1-16 Galway; 2013 All-Ireland qualifier (27 July 2013)

Statistics
- Total meetings: 11
- Most wins: Cork (7)
- All-time series: Cork 7-1-3 Galway

The Cork-Galway rivalry is a Gaelic football rivalry between Irish county teams Cork and Galway, who first played each other in 1911. The fixture has been an infrequent one in the history of the championship, and therefore the rivalry is not as intense between the two teams. Cork's home ground is Páirc Uí Chaoimh and Galway's home ground is Pearse Stadium, however, all of their championship meetings have been held at neutral venues, usually Croke Park.

While Cork have the second highest number of Munster titles and Galway are the record title holders with 50 provincial wins in Connacht, they have also enjoyed All-Ireland Senior Football Championship successes, having won 16 championship titles between them to date.

== All-time results ==
=== Legend ===
Galway win
Cork win
Drawn game

=== Senior ===
No.	Date	Winners	Score	Runners-up	Venue	Competition
1.	3 December 1911	Cork	3-4 - 0-2	Galway	Portlaoise	All-Ireland semi-final
2.	12 August 1945	Cork	2-12 - 2-8	Galway	Croke Park	All-Ireland semi-final
3.	7 October 1956	Galway	2-13 - 3-7	Cork	Croke Park	All-Ireland final
4.	11 August 1957	Cork	2-4 - 0-9	Galway	Croke Park	All-Ireland semi-final
5.	7 August 1966	Galway	1-11 - 1-9	Cork	Croke Park	All-Ireland semi-final
6.	23 September 1973	Cork	3-17 - 2-13	Galway	Croke Park	All-Ireland final
7.	16 August 1987	Cork	1-11 - 1-11	Galway	Croke Park	All-Ireland semi-final
8.	30 August 1987	Cork	0-18 - 1-4	Galway	Croke Park	All-Ireland semi-final Replay
9.	22 July 2001	Galway	1-14 - 1-10	Cork	Croke Park	All-Ireland qualifier round 4
10.	7 August 2005	Cork	2-14 - 2-11	Galway	Croke Park	All-Ireland quarter-final
11.	27 May 2013	Cork	1-17 - 1-16	Galway	Croke Park	All-Ireland qualifier round 4
