= Clavin (supplement) =

Clavin is a Czech dietary supplement for erectile dysfunction. It is notable for its controversial commercials which led to a 2016 change in Czech laws regarding the broadcasting of sexual performance supplement advertisements during the daytime.

== Product ==
Clavin is made by Simply You Pharmaceuticals. Ingredients include saffron, fenugreek, selenium and zinc.

== Commercials ==
Clavin's commercials are known for featuring a man who transforms into a horned devil character upon taking the product. The man is usually surrounded by scantily clad women or has beautiful women desiring to be with him. Commercials have promoted erections "with rapid onset of effect" and used the slogan "Mužem hned", which is a phrase similar both to "We can now" (Můžeme hned) and "For men, now" (Mužům hned).

=== 2014 controversy and law change ===
During the 2014 IIHF World Championship in ice hockey, Clavin commercials aired on Czech Television during games and prompted widespread complaints from viewers due to their adult-themed content. Czech Television ultimately suspended the commercials' broadcasts. Clavin commercials had received viewer complaints in prior years but without action taken.

As a result of the controversy, in March 2016, the Chamber of Deputies of the Czech Republic approved a law where commercials for Clavin and other sexual performance supplements cannot be broadcast between 6am and 10pm. KDU-ČSL Deputy Petr Kudela, who proposed the bill, stated that children watch the commercials during sports games, and parents "explain to their children poorly what the ads actually mean". The bill passed with 93 votes out of 157 present, with opposition from TOP 09 and the Civic Democratic Party (ODS). The Czech Senate later approved the law, which ODS Senate leader Jaroslav Kubera opposed, stating "big children are not afraid of the devil. Don't underestimate children".

The law went into effect on 7 September 2016. In 2019, TV Nova and Prima televize were both cited for airing Clavin commercials before 10pm.

== In popular culture ==
The devil from Clavin commercials was a character in the 2015 Czech film Celebrity s.r.o.
