= Tommy Joe Gilmore =

Galway Gaelic footballer

Personal information
- Born: 1950 (age 75–76) Cortoon, Galway, Ireland

Sport
- Sport: Gaelic football
- Position: Centre Half-back
Club
- Years: Club
- 1968–1985: Cortoon Shamrocks
Club titles
- Galway titles: 0
Inter-county
- Years: County
- 1969–1984: Galway
Inter-county titles
- Connacht titles: 6
- All-Irelands: 0

Tommy Joe Gilmore is a footballer from County Galway, Ireland. He wore the number 6 jersey of Galway throughout the 1970s.

== Early life ==
Born in the village of Cortoon just outside Tuam, Gilmore spent almost twenty years from 1968 onwards in the senior ranks of local Cortoon Shamrocks and helped the small rural club to county semi-final appearances in 1975 and 1978. Centre half-back is the position Gilmore was most noted for playing in, but he played in a variety of locations from full back to full forward. Actually pulling on the number 14 jersey to help his county to victory over Roscommon in the 1981 National League decider. A county minor in 1967 and on Under-21 for two further years, then broke into the county's senior team.

== Biography ==
Gilmore experienced All-Ireland SFC final losses on three occasions as a player. Failure to get his hands on an All-Ireland souvenir was the biggest regret of his career. "It was a big disappointment for me because it's every player's ambition to get one. That would have been a great highlight for me".

The Cortoon Shamrocks star was resident centre half back on the Galway sides which lost to Offaly, Cork and Dublin in 1971 / 1973 and 1974 respectively. Gilmore, the Galway centre half, received All-Star awards in 1972 and 1973, appearing on All-Star teams in the company of players such as Seán O'Neill, Kevin Kilmurray, Brian McEniff, Mick O'Connell and Jimmy Barry-Murphy to name but a few. "Centre back was certainly the position I had the greatest love for and to win two All-Stars there gave me great personal satisfaction. Such awards are nice bonuses as was the National league medal, but everything is only secondary to All-Ireland Championships" he notes ruefully. Gilmore also appeared in four Railway Cup finals, losing all four. Michael O'Hehir referred to the Galway centre half back in the high scoring All-Ireland SFC final of 1973 versus Cork. O'Hehir's words went like this: "Tommy Joe Gilmore has it on his own half back line, he goes past Dinny Long, 60 yards out from the Cork goals, fifty yards out, 40, 30, on the 21 yard line and it's over the bar".

As the most memorable game he ever played in Gilmore selected the 3-11 to 2-7 victory over Down in the 1971 All-Ireland SFC semi final. "That was a great Down team and a day which stood out for me. From a personal point of view I was pleased with my performance in the final but you have to look at the ones you win", states Gilmore who rates Kevin Kilmurray and Tony Hanahoe as two of the best players he encountered. Gilmore arrived on the inter-county scene just after the three-in-a-row had been completed. "When I arrived on the county team the likes of Seamus Leydon, Jim Duggan and Liam Sammon were still there and it was a time during which Galway football was very strong. We were expecting to win more All-Irelands but unfortunately missed out".

Living in Galway city, Gilmore has little active involvement with the national code but had a stint helping out Willie Joyce, Jimmy Duggan, Tomas Heavy and Peter Lee as a selector on the county team between 1986 and 1988.
