= Donal O'Neill (Gaelic footballer) =

Irish Gaelic footballer

Personal information
- Native name: Dónal Ó Néill (Irish)
- Born: 1988 (age 37–38) Galway, Ireland
- Height: 1.75 m (5 ft 9 in)

Sport
- Sport: Gaelic Football
- Position: Right Corner Back
Club
- Years: Club
- 2005–: Cortoon Shamrocks
Inter-county
- Years: County
- 2008–2014: Galway

Donal O'Neill (born 1988) is an Irish Gaelic footballer for the Galway senior team and also plays club football for his local Cortoon Shamrocks.
