= Galway–Kerry Gaelic football rivalry =

Sports rivalry in Ireland

Galway-Kerry
- Location: County Galway; County Kerry
- Teams: Galway; Kerry
- First meeting: Kerry 1-8 – 0-1 Galway; 1913 All-Ireland semi-final (9 November 1913)
- Latest meeting: Galway 0-16 – 0-20 Kerry; 2022 All-Ireland Senior Football Championship Final (24 July 2022)

Statistics
- Total meetings: 23
- Most wins: Kerry (13)
- All-time series: Kerry 13–3–7 Galway
- Largest victory: 12 points Kerry 2-17 – 0-11 Galway; 1984 All-Ireland semi-final 12 August 1984

The Galway–Kerry rivalry is a Gaelic football rivalry between Irish county teams Galway and Kerry, who first played each other in 1913. It was considered to be one of the biggest rivalries in Gaelic games during the 1960s. Kerry's home ground is Fitzgerald Stadium and Galway's home ground is Pearse Stadium, however, all of their championship meetings have been held at neutral venues, usually Croke Park.

The teams are two of the most successful in the sport. Kerry have the most All-Ireland titles of any county, while Galway are the third most successful. At provincial level, Kerry have the highest number of Munster titles while Galway have the most Connacht titles.

== Senior results ==
Galway win
Kerry win
Match was a draw

=== Championship ===
Galway vs Kerry
Date	Venue	Score	Competition
9 November 1913	Portlaoise	1-8 – 0-1	All-Ireland Semi-Final
24 August 1919	Croke Park, Dublin	2-6 – 3-3	All-Ireland Semi-Final
14 September 1919	Croke Park, Dublin	4-2 – 2-2	All-Ireland Semi-Final Replay
25 September 1938	Croke Park, Dublin	3-3 – 2-6	All-Ireland Final
23 October 1938	Croke Park, Dublin	2-4 – 0-7	All-Ireland Final Replay
22 September 1940	Croke Park, Dublin	0-7 – 1-3	All-Ireland Final
7 September 1941	Croke Park, Dublin	1-8 – 0-7	All-Ireland Final
19 August 1942	Croke Park, Dublin	1-3 – 0-3	All-Ireland Semi-Final
15 August 1954	Croke Park, Dublin	2-6 – 1-6	All-Ireland Semi-Final
27 September 1959	Croke Park, Dublin	3-7 – 1-4	All-Ireland Final
7 August 1960	Croke Park, Dublin	1-8 – 0-8	All-Ireland Semi-Final
4 August 1963	Croke Park, Dublin	1-7 – 0-8	All-Ireland Semi-Final
27 September 1964	Croke Park, Dublin	0-15 – 0-10	All-Ireland Final
26 September 1965	Croke Park, Dublin	0-12 – 0-9	All-Ireland Final
12 August 1984	Croke Park, Dublin	2-17 – 0-11	All-Ireland Semi-Final
24 September 2000	Croke Park, Dublin	0-14 – 0-14	All-Ireland Final
7 October 2000	Croke Park, Dublin	0-17 – 1-10	All-Ireland Final Replay
4 August 2002	Croke Park, Dublin	2-17 – 1-12	All-Ireland Quarter-Final
9 August 2008	Croke Park, Dublin	1-21 – 1-16	All-Ireland Quarter-Final
3 August 2014	Croke Park, Dublin	1-20 – 2-10	All-Ireland Quarter-Final
30 July 2017	Croke Park, Dublin	1-18 – 0-13	All-Ireland Quarter-Final
15 July 2018	Croke Park, Dublin	1-13 – 1-10	All-Ireland Quarter-Final Group Stage
24 July 2022	Croke Park, Dublin	0-16 – 0-20	All-Ireland Final
