= Jack Cosgrove (Gaelic footballer) =

Galway Gaelic footballer

Personal information
- Native name: Seán Mac Cosgair (Irish)
- Born: Connemara, County Galway
- Occupation: Garda Síochána

Sport
- Sport: Gaelic football
- Position: Full-back
Club
- Years: Club
- Spiddal
Inter-county
- Years: County
- 1969–1977: Galway
Inter-county titles
- Connacht titles: 4
- All-Irelands: 0
- NFL: 0
- All Stars: 1

Jack Cosgrove (born 1949) is an Irish former Gaelic footballer who played at various times with his local clubs Clifden, Midleton, St. Nicholas' and Spiddal, as well as at senior level for the Galway county team from 1971 until 1977. Cosgrove is a member of the set of Galway players who lost three All-Ireland SFC finals in four years.
