= Noel Colleran =

Irish former sportsperson

Personal information
- Native name: Nollaig Ó Callaráin (Irish)
- Born: 1944 (age 81–82) Mountbellew, County Galway
- Height: 5 ft 10 in (178 cm)

Sport
- Sport: Gaelic football
- Position: Left corner-back
Club
- Years: Club
- 1960s-1970s: Mountbellew
Inter-county
- Years: County
- 1960s-1970s: Galway
Inter-county titles
- Connacht titles: 3
- All-Irelands: 0
- NFL: 0
- All Stars: 0

Noel Colleran (born 1944 in Mountbellew, County Galway) is an Irish former sportsperson. He played Gaelic football with his local club Mountbellew and was a member of the Galway senior inter-county team in the 1960s and 1970s.
