= Liam O'Neill (Gaelic footballer) =

Galway Gaelic footballer

Personal information
- Native name: Liam Ó Néill (Irish)
- Born: 1947 (age 78–79) Ballinasloe, County Galway
- Height: 5 ft 10 in (178 cm)

Sport
- Sport: Gaelic football
- Position: Right wing-back
Club
- Years: Club
- 1960s–1970s: St Grellan's
Inter-county
- Years: County
- 1960s–1970s: Galway
Inter-county titles
- Connacht titles: 6
- All-Irelands: 0
- NFL: 0
- All Stars: 1

Liam O'Neill (born 1947) is an Irish former Gaelic footballer who played as a right wing-back at senior level for the Galway county team.

O'Neill joined the team during the late 1960s and was a regular member of the starting fifteen for almost a decade. During that time he won six Connacht medals and one All-Star award. He is a member of a unique set of Galway players who lost three All-Ireland finals in four years

O'Neill had a lengthy club career with St Grellan's.

He went on to manage the Mayo county football team in later years and his son Kevin played inter-county football for Mayo.
