= Nicholas Clavin =

Offaly Gaelic footballer

Personal information
- Native name: Nioclás Ó Clamháin (Irish)
- Nickname: Nick
- Born: 1948 (age 77–78) Rahan, County Offaly
- Height: 6 ft 0 in (183 cm)

Sport
- Sport: Gaelic football
- Position: Centre-back
Club
- Years: Club
- 1960s–1980s: St Carthage's
Inter-county
| Years | County | Apps (scores) |
| 1968–1973 | Offaly | 22 |
Inter-county titles
- Leinster titles: 4
- All-Irelands: 2
- NFL: 0
- All Stars: 1

Nicholas "Nick" Clavin (born 1948 in Rahan, County Offaly) is an Irish former sportsman. He played Gaelic football with his local club St Carthage's and was a member of the Offaly senior county team from 1968 until 1973. He was ordained in All Hallows College, Dublin in 1973, for the Diocese of San Diego. As of 2016, he was pastor of St Gregory the Great Catholic Church in San Diego, California. Fr. Clavin was inducted into the Offaly GAA Hall of Fame in 2017.
