= Danny Cummins =

Irish sportsperson

Personal information
- Native name: Dónal Ó Coimín (Irish)
- Born: 27 March 1990 (age 36) Galway, Ireland
- Height: 1.8 m (5 ft 11 in)

Sport
- Sport: Gaelic Football
- Position: Left corner forward
Club
- Years: Club
- 2007–: Claregalway
Inter-county
- Years: County
- 2011–2019: Galway
Inter-county titles
- Connacht titles: 1

Danny Cummins (born 27 March 1990) is an Irish sportsperson, who plays inter-county Gaelic football for Galway. He plays his club football for Claregalway. He has also represented IT Sligo in the Sigerson Cup and FBD League.

Cummins played on the Galway team that won the Under-21 Championship in 2011. He made his senior Championship debut in the same year, coming on as a substitute in Galway's Connacht semi-final defeat to Mayo. In 2016, Cummins was part of the Galway team that won the Connacht Championship. In the replay of the final against Roscommon, Cummins scored two goals and was named man of the match as Galway won the J. J. Nestor Cup for the first time since 2008.
