= Gay Mitchell (Gaelic footballer) =

Irish Gaelic footballer

Personal information
- Native name: Gaibriél Mistéil (Irish)
- Born: 1948 (age 77–78) Dunmore, County Galway
- Height: 6 ft 1 in (185 cm)

Sport
- Sport: Gaelic football
- Position: Goalkeeper
Club
- Years: Club
- 1950s-1980s: Dunmore McHales
Inter-county
- Years: County
- 1970s: Galway
Inter-county titles
- Connacht titles: 3
- All-Irelands: 0
- NFL: 0
- All Stars: 0

Gay Mitchell (born 1948 in Dunmore, County Galway) is an Irish former sportsperson. He played Gaelic football with his local club Dunmore McHales and was a member of the Galway senior inter-county team in the 1970s.

Sporting positions
Preceded by Liam Sammon	Galway Senior Football Captain; 1974	Succeeded by
