= T. J. Gilmore =

Irish Gaelic footballer

Personal information
- Native name: T. S. Mac Giolla Mhir (Irish)
- Born: Cortoon, County Galway

Sport
- Sport: Gaelic football
- Position: Centre-back
Club
- Years: Club
- 1968-1987: Cortoon Shamrocks
Inter-county
- Years: County
- 1970s-1980s: Galway
Inter-county titles
- Connacht titles: 6
- All-Irelands: 0
- NFL: 1
- All Stars: 2

Thomas Joseph 'T. J.' Gilmore (born 1949 in Cortoon, County Galway) is an Irish former sportsperson. He played Gaelic football with his local club Cortoon Shamrocks and was a member of the Galway senior inter-county team in the 1970s and 1980s. Gilmore is a member of the set of Galway players who lost three All-Ireland finals in four years.
