= Brendan Colleran =

Irish former sportsperson

Brenda Colleran
Personal information
- Native name: Breandán Ó Callaráin (Irish)
- Born: 1948 (age 77–78) Mountbellew, County Galway, Ireland
- Occupation: CEO of Galway City VEC
- Height: 5 ft 11 in (180 cm)

Sport
- Sport: Gaelic football
- Position: Left corner-back
Club
- Years: Club
- 1960s-1980s: Mountbellew
Inter-county
- Years: County
- 1970-1976: Galway
Inter-county titles
- Connacht titles: 5 (1 as sub)
- All-Irelands: 0
- NFL: 0
- All Stars: 0

Brendan Colleran (born 1948) is an Irish former sportsperson. He played Gaelic football with his local club Mountbellew and was a member of the Galway senior inter-county team in the 1970s. Colleran is one of a small number of Galway players who lost three All-Ireland finals in four years.
