= Jimmy Duggan (Gaelic footballer) =

Irish former Gaelic footballer

Personal information
- Native name: Séamus Ó Duagáin (Irish)
- Born: 1947 (age 78–79) Tuam, County Mayo
- Height: 6 ft 0 in (183 cm)

Sport
- Sport: Gaelic football
- Position: Midfield
Club
- Years: Club
- 1960s-1980s: Corofin
Inter-county
- Years: County
- 1966-1978: Galway
Inter-county titles
- Connacht titles: 7
- All-Irelands: 1
- NFL: 0

Jimmy Duggan (born 1947 in Tuam, County Galway) is a former Irish Gaelic footballer. He played for his local club, Corofin, and was a member of the Galway senior inter-county team from 1966 to 1978.
