= Salthill =

Suburb of Galway City, Ireland

Salthill Bóthar na Trá (Irish)
- Suburb of Galway
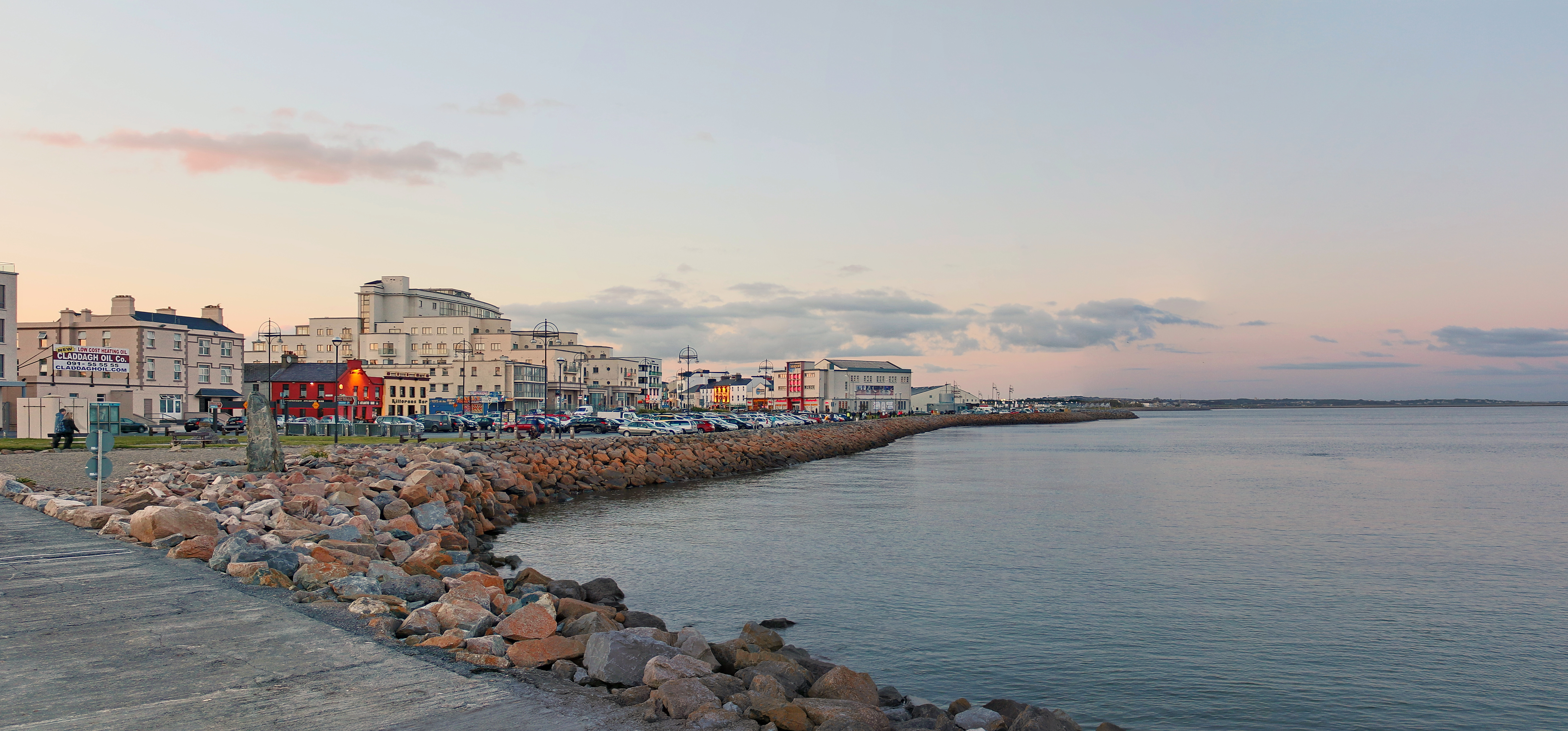
- Salthill and Galway Bay

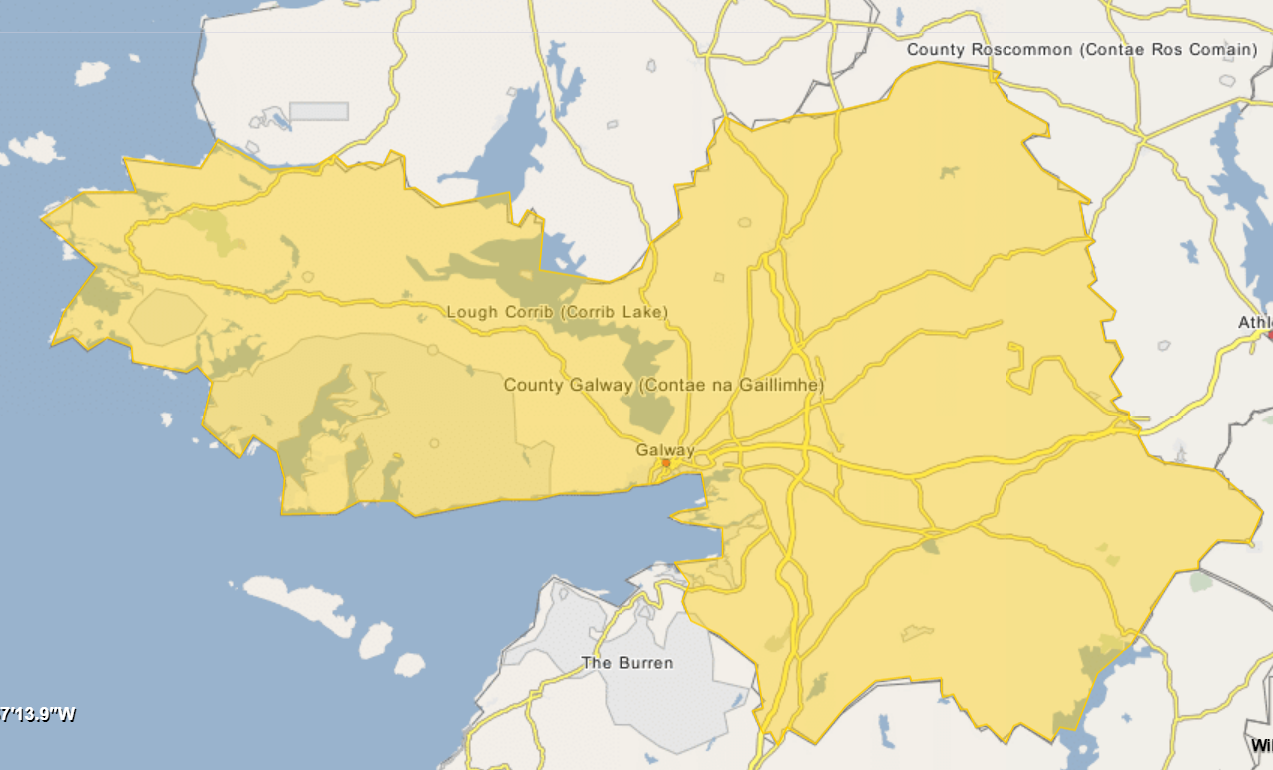
- Location in County Galway
- Coordinates: 53°15′39.6″N 9°04′30.2″W
- Country: Ireland
- Province: Connacht
- County: County Galway
- City Council: Galway

Population (2016)
  - Total: 3,650
- Irish Grid Reference: M275248

Salthill (Irish: Bóthar na Trá, meaning 'road of the strand') is a seaside area to the southwest of Galway city centre in the west of Ireland. The area is home to a number of tourist amenities and there is a 2 km long promenade, locally known as "the Prom", which overlooks Galway Bay.

== History ==
The village of Salthill, which was known as "Salt Hill" until 1819, was originally a separate and "outlying village" of Galway city. Salthill's promenade opened in 1856.

=== 19th century tourism ===
Salthill became a bathing resort in the 19th century, capitalising on the rising popularity of seaside bathing amongst both pleasure seekers and believers in the medicinal properties of mineral waters. Doctor Robert Rogers Gray opened his artificial medicinal baths in 1831 on the site that today consists of the reclaimed land of Claude Toft Park. These baths remained Salthill's primary bathing attraction until a fire burned down the complex in 1870.

The influx of tourism brought to Salthill through the baths created corresponding demand for accommodation. Bathing lodges at Blackrock House and along modern-day Upper Salthill Road represented the higher end of 19th-century accommodation, being described in the Freeman's Journal as "more substantial than showy, and are one and all of comfortable prescence and most cosily placed". The buildings of Gort Ard, Lisgorm and St. Mary's survive today as examples of these bathing lodges.

Salthill's first notable hotel was John Gill's Eglinton Hotel. Built in 1860, the hotel was "crowded with tourists" during the summer months of the late 19th century. Several other hotels were developed from 1860 onwards.

The bandstand in Salthill Park was built c. 1880.

=== Tramway ===
By the 1870s, as Salthill continued to grow as a village, "four-wheeled 2-horse buses, seating 25 passengers" connected Salthill to Galway City. In 1877, inspired by the opening of tramways in Dublin and Belfast, William Leadbetter Barrington passed a bill through the British Parliament to open a tramway connecting Salthill to Galway City. Costing roughly £15,000, the tramway officially opened on 1 October 1879. It closed in 1918.

=== 20th century ===
Salthill's promenade was further developed in the mid-20th century, and the 'Blackrock Diving Tower' was constructed in 1953.

The 1970s saw the introduction of a number of casinos and more leisure centres.

== Events ==
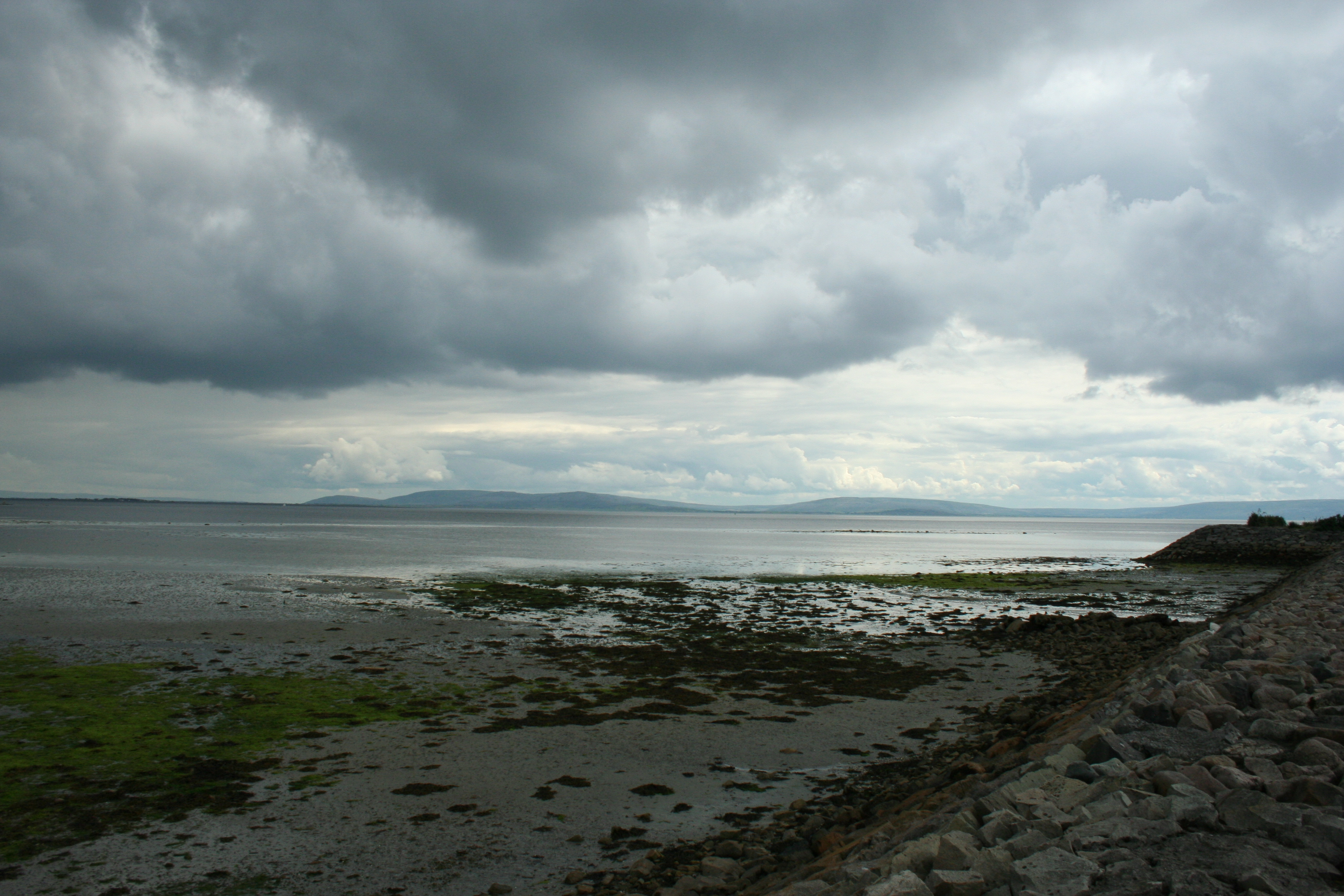
Galway Bay from the Promenade, Salthill

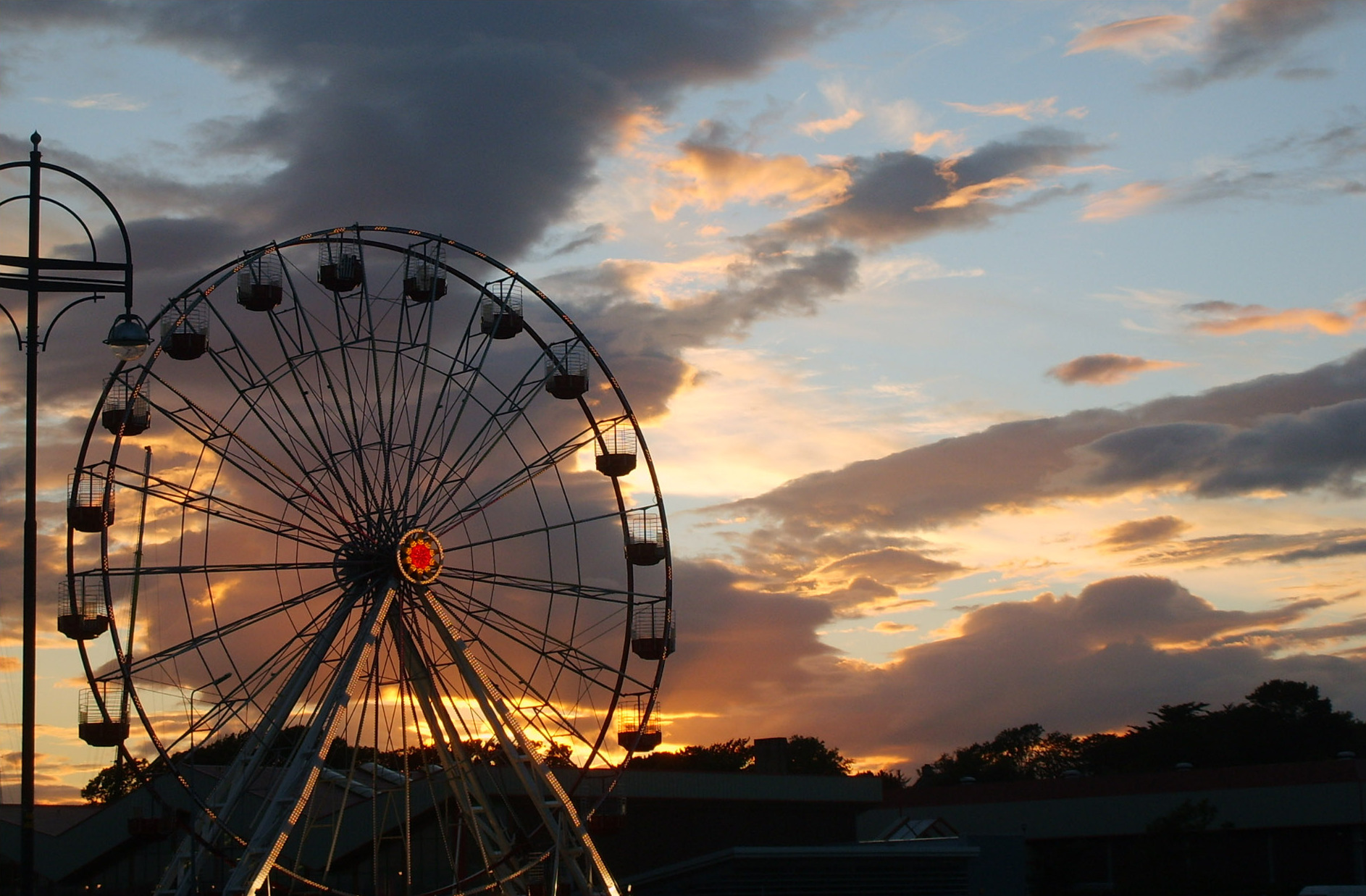
Leisureland's big wheel

Salthill was, until 2007, home to one of the biggest non-fee paying air shows in Galway, the Salthill Air Show, which took place in June over Galway Bay. The show annually attracted over 100,000 people and generated over €1m in revenue.

Salthill was a centre point for the 2008–09 Volvo Ocean Race, as well as the Round-Ireland Powerboat race in 2010.

It is traditional on Christmas Day to jump into the sea from Blackrock Diving Tower. This event is now used a fundraiser for local charities in Galway.

In the summer there are a number of different open water swimming events in Salthill. Known locally as "prom swims", these take place between Blackrock Tower and Grattan Beach. These range between 500m to 2.5 km in length and typically run parallel to the shore. Each July, the annual Galway Bay Swim, a 10.5 km open water swimming event, takes place from Aughinish in County Clare to Blackrock Diving Tower, in Salthill. This event is used as a fundraiser for local charities in Galway.

== Sport ==
Salthill-Knocknacarra (SKGAA) is the local Gaelic Athletic Association club and fields teams in Gaelic football, Ladies football, hurling and camogie. The club's senior men's team won the All-Ireland Senior Club Football Championship in 2006, beating St. Gall's in the final. A team representing the club also won the 2022 Ladies Junior Football title. Pearse Stadium, one of Galway GAA's two primary stadiums (the other being St Jarlath's Park), is on Dr Mannix Road in Salthill.

Salthill Devon F.C., the local football team, fields teams in the Galway & District League. They played in the League of Ireland First Division from 2010 to 2013, before merging with Mervue United and Galway United Supporters Trust, the supporters trust of the then defunct Galway United, to form Galway F.C.

The Galway Lawn Tennis Club, winner of Irish Tennis Club of the Year in 2002, is located on Threadneedle Road.

== Transport ==
Salthill railway station opened on 1 October 1879 and closed for passenger traffic in January 1918. The nearest station is Galway.

As of 2025, there is one city bus service, Bus Éireann route 401, which runs to from Salthill to Eyre Square. Bus Éireann also runs bus route 424 from Galway's bus station to Lettermullen through Salthill, while City Direct runs route 410 from Knocknacarra to Eyre Square via Salthill as well.

== Popular culture ==
The Long Walk and the Salthill promenade are both referenced in the Steve Earle penned tune "Galway Girl".

== See also ==
- Galway Famine Ship Memorial
- Wild Atlantic Way
- List of towns and villages in Ireland
