= 2026 Galway Senior Football Championship =

Gaelic football competition in Galway, Ireland for the 2026 season

Galway S.F.C.
- Season: 2026
- Champions: Bóthar na Trá–Cnoc na Cathrach; Salthill–Knocknacarra (4th title)
- Winning captain: Daniel O'Flaherty
- Man of the Match: Matthew Thompson

The 2026 Galway Senior Football Championship is the 131st edition of Galway GAA's premier Gaelic football tournament for senior clubs in County Galway, Ireland. The winners will receive the Frank Fox Cup and represent Galway in the Connacht Senior Club Football Championship.

Sixteen teams compete in the championship. The previous year's four semi-finalists were seeded and separated into four groups of four.

Moycullen are the defending champions, having defeated Salthill/Knocknacarra in the 2025 final.

Caltra returned to the senior grade after a 12-season absence, having been relegated from the S.F.C. in 2014. They earned promotion by winning the 2025 Galway Intermediate Club Football Championship.

== Team changes ==
The following teams changed division following the 2025 championship season.

=== To S.F.C. ===
Promoted from 2025 Galway Intermediate Football Championship

- Caltra – Intermediate champions

=== From S.F.C. ===
Relegated to 2026 Galway Intermediate Football Championship

- St Michael's

== Format ==
=== Group stage ===
The 2026 championship retained the same format as 2025, with four groups of four teams.

The four 2025 semi-finalists, Corofin, Moycullen, Tuam Stars and Salthill/Knocknacarra, were seeded and placed in separate groups. The remaining 12 teams were placed through an open draw.

A draw determined the first-round fixtures. In the second round, the winners of the opening-round matches play each other, while the two losing teams also meet. The third round consists of the remaining fixtures between teams that have not yet played each other.

If teams are level on points, the first deciding factor is the head-to-head result between the sides, followed by points difference and then scoring average.

=== Knockout stage ===
The second- and third-placed teams in Groups 1, 2, 3 and 4 qualify for the preliminary quarter-finals. The winners of the preliminary quarter-finals qualify for the quarter-finals, where they join the four group winners.

=== Relegation play-off ===
The fourth-placed teams in Groups 1, 2, 3 and 4 contest the relegation semi-finals. The two winners of these semi-finals secure their senior status for 2027, while the two losers proceed to the relegation final.

The loser of the relegation final will be relegated to the 2027 Galway Intermediate Football Championship, while the winner will retain their senior status for 2027.

== Group stages ==
=== Group 1 ===
Pos	Team	Pld	W	D	L	PF	PA	PD	Pts
1	Corofin (Q)	3	3	0	0	76	37	+39	6
2	Claregalway	3	2	0	1	59	59	0	4
3	Mountbellew/Moylough	3	1	0	2	59	59	0	2
4	Killannin (q)	3	0	0	3	40	79	−39	0

Updated to match(es) played on 29 September 2026. Source: Galway GAA

(Q): Qualified for Quarter-Finals (q): Qualified for Relegation Semi-Finals

Round 1

31/7/2026
7.30 PM

Killannin	1-11 (14) – (26) 5-11	Mountbellew/Moylough
Cian Folan 1-3, Enda Kelly (tpf, 2f) 0-5, Cathal Walsh, Brian Mitchell, P Bohan 0-1 each.	Report	Ciarán Mulhern 1-2, Eoin Finnerty (2f) 0-4, Tony Shields, Patrick Kelly 1-1 each, Seán Kelly, Colin Ryan 1-0 each, James Foley, Brian Noone 0-1 each.

Pearse Stadium, Galway
Referee: Thomas Murphy
31/7/2026
7.30 PM

Corofin	2-19 (25) – (12) 2-06	Claregalway
Darragh Silke (2p) 1-5, Aaron Looney (2 tp) 0-4, Killian Joyce 1-0, Kieran Molloy ('45'), Ross Coen (2p), Jason Leonard (2p) 0-2 each, Liam Silke, Jack McCabe 0-1 each.	Report	Jack Mullen (2p, 1f) 1-3, Dave Tarmey 1-0, Conor Flaherty, Jack Lonergan 0-1 each.

Kenny Park, Athenry
Referee: Patrick Holohan

Round 2

15/08/2026

Corofin	1-19 (22) – (17) 0-17	Mountbellew/Moylough
Darragh Silke (2tp, 1f) 0-7, Dylan McHugh (2tp), Liam Silke (2p) 0-2 each, Jason Leonard 1-0, Jack McCabe 0-3, Ross Coen, Vinny Gill, Killian Joyce 0-1 each.	Report	Michael Foley (2 tpf, '45') 0-5, Ciarán Mulhern (2f) 0-3, Colin Ryan 0-2, Patrick Kelly, John Daly, Brian Noone 0-1 each.

Tuam Stadium, Tuam
Referee: Christopher Ryan
15/08/2026

Killannin	1-15 (18) – (24) 3-15	Claregalway
Enda Kelly (1f, 2p), Dara Walsh (2p, tpf) 0-4 each, Cian Folan 1-0, Johnny Heaney (2p), Ryan Melia 0-2 each, Ryan Roche 0-1.	Report	Conor Flaherty (1f) 2-2, Paraic Commins (tpf) 1-2, Jack Lonergan (2p) 0-4, Morgan Morrin (2p), Ger O'Riordan 0-2 each, Dara Whelan, Owen Morgan 0-1 each.

Pearse Stadium, Galway
Referee: James Molloy

Round 3

29/08/2026

Claregalway	3-14 (23) – (16) 1-13	Mountbellew/Moylough
Jack Mullen (1f) 1-3, Ger O'Riordan 1-2, Paraic Commins (tpf, 1f) 0-4, Daniel Fitzmaurice 1-0, Jason Reilly 0-2, Conor Flaherty (1f), Conor Campbell, Brian Connolly 0-1 each.	Report	Eoin Finnerty (2p) 1-2, John Daly (2p), Brian Mannion (2p) 0-2 each, Patrick Kelly, Seán Kelly, Ciarán Mulhern 0-1 each.

Tuam Stadium, Tuam
Referee: Austin O'Connell
29/08/2026

Killannin	1-05 (8) – (29) 3-20	Corofin
Dara Walsh (1f) 0-3, Cian Folan 1-0, Ryan Roche, Johnny Heaney ('45') 0-1 each.		Ross Coen, Darragh Silke 1-4 each, Kieran Molloy (2tp) 0-5, Killian Joyce (2p) 0-3, Liam Silke 1-0, Jason Leonard (1f) 0-2, Micheál Lundy, Colin Brady 0-1 each.

Pearse Stadium, Galway
Referee: Colm Conway

=== Group 2 ===
Pos	Team	Pld	W	D	L	PF	PA	PD	Pts
1	Salthill/Knocknacarra (Q)	3	3	0	0	69	33	+36	6
2	Milltown	3	1	1	1	50	46	+4	3
3	Bearna	3	1	0	2	36	63	−27	2
4	Caltra (q)	3	0	1	2	42	55	−13	1

Updated to match(es) played on 30 September 2026. Source: Galway GAA

(Q): Qualified for Quarter-Finals (q): Qualified for Relegation Semi-Finals

Round 1

31/7/2026
7:30 PM

Salthill/Knocknacarra	1-13 (16) – (10) 1-07	Milltown
Seán Costello 1-1, Robert Finnerty (tpf) 0-3, Ruairí Lavelle (tpf) 0-2, James O'Meara, John Maher, Daniel O'Flaherty, Robert Walzer (1f), Mark Mannion 0-1 each.	Report	Eoin Mannion (1f) 0-3, Terrence Godwin 1-0, Michael Martin (2f) 0-2, Darragh Costello, Niall Costello 0-1 each.

Tuam Stadium, Tuam
Referee: Shane Curley
1/8/2026
4:30 PM

Caltra	0-11 (11) – (14) 0-14	Bearna
Kelan Murray (2p) 0-3, Alan Naughton (1f), Owen Naughton 0-2 each, Eoin Ó Ceallaigh, Oisín Butler, Odhran Loughrey ('45'), Luke Cosgrove 0-1 each.	Report	Seán Dunne (2 tp) 0-4, Tom Curran (3f), Padraig Lenihan 0-3 each, Cian Hernon, James Kennedy, Darragh Cox 0-1 each.

Kenny Park, Athenry
Referee: Ronan McNulty

Round 2

15/08/2026

Caltra	3-12 (21) – (21) 0-21	Milltown
Alan Naughton 1-5, Shaun Keane 2-1, Kealan Murray (2p), Mike Mulryan (2p), Oisín Butler (2p) 0-2 each.	Report	Michael Martin (2f, tpf) 0-8, Eoin Mannion (3f) 0-6, Terrence Godwin 0-3, Darragh Costello 0-2, Mark Hehir, Niall Costello 0-1 each.

Pearse Stadium, Galway
Referee: Austin O'Connell
16/08/2026

Salthill/Knocknacarra	5-18 (33) – (13) 0-13	Bearna
Robert Finnerty (pen, 2p, tpf) 2-6, Matthew Thompson (2p) 0-4, Daniel O'Flaherty 1-1, Brian Conlon, Robert Walzer 1-0 each, Mark Mannion, Ruairí Lavelle (tpf) 0-2 each, Cillian O'Toole, Charlie Power 0-1 each.	Report	Tom Curran (tpf, 2p, 5f) 0-9, Seán Dunne (2p) 0-3, Donnacha Forde, Darragh Cox 0-1 each.

Pearse Stadium, Galway
Referee: Martin Flaherty

Round 3

30/08/2026

Milltown	0-19 (19) – (9) 0-09	Bearna
Eoin Mannion (3f) 0-5, Terrence Godwin (2p) 0-4, Michael Martin (2f) 0-3, Niall Costello, Liam Costello 0-2 each, Mark Hehir 0-1.	Report	Seán Dunne (2tp, tpf) 0-7, Donnacha Naughton, Jack Walsh 0-1 each.

Kenny Park, Athenry
Referee: Thomas Murphy
30/08/2026

Salthill/Knocknacarra	1-17 (20) – (10) 0-10	Caltra
Robert Finnerty (0-1 pen) 0-5, Matthew Thompson 0-4, Daniel O'Flaherty 1-0, Seán Costello 0-2, Cathal Sweeney, Cillian O'Toole, Mikey Mullery, Michael Kitt, James O'Meara 0-1 each.	Report	Alan Naughton (5f) 0-6, Darragh McCabe (tpf) 0-2, Shaun Keane (1f), Kealan Murray 0-1 each.

Tuam Stadium, Tuam
Referee: Paddy Ó Gríofa

=== Group 3 ===
Pos	Team	Pld	W	D	L	PF	PA	PD	Pts
1	Moycullen (Q)	3	3	0	0	82	48	+34	6
2	Dunmore MacHales	3	2	0	1	74	72	+2	4
3	Monivea/Abbey	3	1	0	2	64	83	−19	2
4	Naomh Anna, Leitir Móir (q)	3	0	0	3	43	60	−17	0

Updated to match(es) played on 29 September 2026. Source: Galway GAA

Round 1

1/08/2026
6:30 PM

Moycullen	1-16 (19) – (8) 0-08	Leitir Móir
Fiachra McDonagh 1-2, James McLaughlin (2p), Paul Kelly (3f), Fionn McDonagh, Charlie Cox 0-2 each, Cillian Gallagher, Seán O'Connor, David Wynne 0-1 each.	Report	Dylan Seoighe (tpf, 1f) 0-3, Iarla Ó Curraoin (2f), Fionn Mac Donnacha 0-2 each, Tomás Ó Curraoin 0-1.

Pearse Stadium, Galway
Referee: Noel Dempsey
1/8/2026
6.30 PM

Dunmore MacHales	4-17 (29) – (28) 5-13	Monivea/Abbey
Colm Costello (2p) 2-4, Padraig Costello (1f) 1-4, Shane McGrath (2p) 1-3, Matthew Reddington (2p) 0-3, Jake Slattery, Shane Mitchell, Seán Murray 0-1 each.	Report	Glenn Kelly (2 tpf, 3f, '45') 2-9, Trevor Mullins 1-2, Lee Kenny 1-1, Shane King 1-0, Darragh Burke 0-1

Tuam Stadium, Tuam
Referee: Austin O'Connell

Round 2

16/08/2026

Leitir Móir	1-13 (16) – (17) 0-17	Monivea/Abbey
Oisín Mac Donnacha (1f, 2tp) 0-5, Tomás Ó Curraoin (2p) 1-2, Fionn Mac Donnacha, Dylan Seoighe (0-2, Eoin Ó Fátharta 0-1.	Report	Glenn Kelly (3f, 2p) 0-8, Cillian McDaid 0-3, Shane King (2p), Niall Mannion 0-2 each, Cian Dolan, Lee Kenny 0-1 each.

Pearse Stadium, Galway
Referee: Anthony Coyne
16/08/2026

Dunmore MacHales	2-15 (21) – (25) 3-16	Moycullen
Thomas Gleeson (2p) 1-3, Padraig Costello (4f) 0-5, Matthew Reddington 1-0, Conor Gleeson (tpf), Dylan Brady (2p) 0-2 each, Barry Murray, Colm Costello 0-1 each.	Report	Niall Walsh (2tp ) 1-5, Fionn McDonagh, Owen Gallagher 0-4 each, Fiachra McDonagh, Cillian Gallagher 1-0 each, Seán O'Connor 0-2, Paul Kelly 0-1.

Kenny Park, Athenry
Referee: James Molloy

Round 3

29/08/2026

Moycullen	6-20 (38) – (19) 0-19	Monivea/Abbey
Niall Walsh (pen, 2p) 2-8, Paul Kelly (3f) 0-5, Johnny Moloney 1-2, Seán Kelly, Charlie Cox 1-1 each, Seán O'Connor 1-0, D Wynne, Ger Daveron 0-1 each.	Report	Glenn Kelly (tpf, 2f, 2 '45') 0-8, Lee Kenny (2p) 0-4, Cillian McDaid 0-3, Niall Mannion 0-2, Brian Moran, Lewis Ryan 0-1 each.

Tuam Stadium, Tuam
29/08/2026

Dunmore MacHales	4-12 (24) – (19) 3-10	Leitir Móir
Colm Costello (pen) 2-1, Barry Murray 2-0, Shane McGrath (2p) 0-4, Padraig Costello (1f) 0-3, Dylan Brady, Brendan Carr, Jake Slattery, L Murray 0-1 each.	Report	Tomás Ó Curraoin (2 pen, 2f) 2-2, Dylan Seoighe 1-1, Oisín MacDonnacha (3f), Fionn MacDonnacha 0-3 each, Eamon Ó Loingsigh 0-1.

Pearse Stadium, Galway
Referee: Patrick Holohan

=== Group 4 ===
Pos	Team	Pld	W	D	L	PF	PA	PD	Pts
1	Annaghdown (Q)	3	1	2	0	61	60	+1	4
2	Tuam Stars	3	2	0	1	67	56	+11	4
3	Oughterard	3	1	1	1	63	66	−3	3
4	St James' (q)	3	0	1	2	60	69	−9	1

Updated to match(es) played on 30 September 2026. Source: Galway GAA

Round 1

1/8/2026

Annaghdown	1-17 (20) – (20) 0-20	St James'
Conor Quinn (2p) 1-3, Stephen Curley (3f) 0-4, Diarmuid Kilcommins (2p), Olan Kelly 0-3 each, Ethan Forde, James Healy (f), John McDonnell, Darragh Hegarty 0-1 each.	Report	Jack Nolan (2p, tpf, 1f) 0-8, Jack O'Neill (2p) 0-4, Paul Conroy (tpf), Daniel McNulty 0-2 each, Kevin Hourigan, Dessie Hynes, Brian Kane, Ruairí King 0-1 each.

Kenny Park, Athenry
Referee: Paddy Griffin
1/8/2026

Oughterard	0-15 (15) – (26) 2-20	Tuam Stars
Niall Lee (tpf), Eric Lee (2p), Matthew Tierney (1f, 2p) 0-3 each, Ryan Monaghan, Ciarán Noone (tpf) 0-2 each, Adam Tierney, James Webb 0-1 each.	Report	Luke Davin 1-6, Mark Colleran (2p, '45') 0-5, Paul Collins 1-0, Rory O'Connor, Dara Heneghan, Shay McGlinchey, Dara Ó Ruairc, Ronan Colleran, Jamie Murphy, Brian Mannion, Jack Grugan, Jack Heneghan 0-1 each.

Pearse Stadium, Galway
Referee: James Molloy

Round 2

16/08/2026

Annaghdown	2-14 (20) – (19) 1-16	Tuam Stars
Damien Comer (2p) 2-3, James Healy (tpf, '45') 0-3, Olan Kelly (2p), Diarmuid Kilcommins (2p) 0-2 each, Stephen Curley, (1f), Eoin Newell, Conor Quinn 0-1 each.	Report	Brian Mannion (tpf) 1-3, Jack Grugan (2p) 0-5, Shay McGlinchey (2p), Luke Davin (2p) 0-3 each, Conor Doherty, Rory O'Connor 0-1 each.

Kenny Park, Athenry
Referee: Patrick Holohan
15/08/2026

St James'	1-16 (19) – (27) 3-18	Oughterard
Jack Nolan (2f) 1-2, Paul Conroy (2p, 3f) 0-5, Jack O'Neill 0-4, Daniel McNulty, Ruairí King, Jack Folan, J Ryan, Evan Boyce 0-1 each.		Niall Lee (2p, 1f) 1-4, James Lowry (2tp) 0-6, Matthew Tierney (1f) 1-2, Eric Lee (2tp) 0-3, Tierney 1-0, Ciarán Noone ('45'), Cian Monaghan, Ryan Monaghan 0-1 each.

Pearse Stadium, Galway
Referee: Richard McNicholas

Round 3

30/08/2026

Annaghdown	2-15 (21) – (21) 1-18	Oughterard
Stephen Curley (4f) 0-5, James Healy (2f, '45'), Diarmuid Kilcommins (2p) 0-3 each, Eoin Newell, Eoin Reddington 1-0 each, Cathal Heavey 0-2, Jonathan Creaven, Damien Comer (f), 0-1 each.	Report	Niall Lee (1f) 1-4, Ciarán Noone (tpf, 1f), Ryan Monaghan (2p), Matthew Tierney (2p) 0-3 each, Cian Monaghan, Eric Lee (2p) 0-2 each, James Webb 0-1.

Pearse Stadium, Galway
Referee: James Molloy
30/08/2026

St James'	3-12 (21) – (22) 2-16	Tuam Stars
Colin Kelly 1-2, Jack O'Neill (2p) 0-4, Jonah Culligan 1-1, Aaron Connolly 1-0, Jack Nolan (3f) 0-3, Paul Conroy (2p) 0-2.	Report	Shay McGlinchey 1-1, Conor Heneghan 1-0, Brian Mannion (2p), Luke Davin (2f) 0-3 each, Jack Cryan 0-2, Darragh Creavan ('45'), Rory O'Connor, Dara Heneghan, Jamie Murphy, Jack Grugan, Mark Colleran (f), Ronan Colleran 0-1 each.

Kenny Park, Athenry

== Relegation play-offs ==
=== Relegation semi-finals ===
The 4th placed teams from Groups 1, 2, 3 and 4 face-off in the relegation semi-finals. The two winners from these semi-finals secured their senior status for 2026, while the two losers will proceed to the relegation final.

12/09/2026 Relegation Semi-Final	Caltra	1-12 (15) – (23) 1-20	St James'	Tuam
5 PM IST (UTC+1)				Venue: Tuam Stadium
	Pts: Alan Naughton (1f, 2x2p) 0-8, Shaun Keane 1-0, Seán Butler (2p) 0-2, Ross Hannon, Jack Muldowney 0-1 each.	Report	Pts: Jack Nolan (3f, 2x2pf) 1-9, Ruairí King 0-4, Colin Kelly 0-3, Paul Conroy (1f, 1m) 0-2, Jack Ryan, Dessie Hynes 0-1 each.	Referee: Shane Curley

13/09/2026 Relegation semi-final	Killannin	1-20 (23) – (22) 4-10	Leitir Móir	Galway
4.30 PM IST (UTC+1)				Venue: Pearse Stadium
	Pts: Dara Walsh (3x2p, 2pf) 0-9, Johnny Heaney (1-0pen, 2p) 1-4, Enda Kelly (2pf, 1f) 0-3, Brian Mitchell (2p) 0-2, Cian Marks, Cian Folan 0-1 each.	Report	Pts: Oisín Mac Donnacha (3f) 1-5, Fionn Mac Donnacha 1-2, Warren Seoighe, Dylan Seoighe 1-0 each, Iarla Ó Curraoin (2pf) 0-2, Ciarán Ó Catháin 0-1.	Referee: Austin O'Connell

=== Relegation final ===
The loser of the Relegation final was relegated to the 2026 Galway I.F.C. The winner maintained their Senior status into 2026.

26/09/2026 Relegation final	Caltra	3-12 (21) – (18) 1-15	Leitir Móir	Galway
5 PM IST (UTC+1)				Venue: Pearse Stadium
				Referee: Christopher Ryan

== Knockout Stage ==
=== Preliminary Quarter-finals ===
The 2nd and 3rd placed teams in Groups 1, 2, 3 and 4 qualify for the preliminary quarter-finals. The winners qualify for the quarter-finals.

On the 30th August the draw was made.

12/09/2026 Preliminary Quarter-final	Claregalway	3-15 (24) – (13) 2-07	Bearna	Galway
3.15pm	Owen Morgan 1-3, Dave Tarney, Dara Whelan 1-0 each, Eamon McGrath (3'45'), Jack Lonergan (2p) 0-3 each, Paraic Commins (1f), Jack Mullen (1f), Seán Moran 0-2 each.	Report	Tom Curran (2pf, 2f) 0-4, Seán Dunne, Donnacha Naughton 1-0 each, Darragh Costello 0-2, James Fallon 0-1.	Stadium: Pearse Stadium; Referee: Paddy Ó Gríofa

12/09/2026 Preliminary Quarter-final	Oughterard	1-20 (23) – (22) 1-19	Dunmore MacHales	Galway
5pm	Matthew Tierney (2x2p) 0-5, James Lowry 1-1, Ryan Monaghan (1x2p) 0-4, Niall Lee (1x2p) 0-3, Adam Tierney, C Donoghue, Cian Monaghan 0-2 each, Paddy Walsh 0-1.	Report	Padraig Costello (1x2p, 2f) 0-8, Colm Costello (1-0pen) 1-2, Jake Slattery (2x2p) 0-4, Conor Gleeson (1x2pf) 0-2, Dylan Brady, Thomas Gleeson, Shane McGrath 0-1 each.	Stadium: Pearse Stadium; Referee: Thomas Murphy

13/09/2026 Preliminary Quarter-final	Tuam Stars	0-13 (13) – (20) 0-20	Mountbellew/Moylough	Tuam
2.45pm	Gary O'Donnell (1x2p), Shay McGlinchey (1x2p), Jack Grugan (1x2p) 0-3 each, Luke Davin (2f) 0-2, Dara Heneghan, Brian Mannion 0-1 each.	Report	Barry McHugh (2x2pf, 2f) 0-8, Eoin Finnerty (1x2p) 0-5, Ciarán Mulhern 0-3, John Daly (2p) 0-2, Michael Burke, Patrick Kelly 0-1 each.	Stadium: Tuam Stadium; Referee: Christopher Ryan

13/09/2026 Preliminary Quarter-final	Milltown	0-15 (15) – (16) 0-16	Monivea/Abbey	Tuam
4.30pm	Eoin Mannion (2f) 0-5, Michael Martin 0-3, Mark Hehir (2pf), Liam Costello, Darragh Costello 0-2 each, C Brennan 0-1.	Report	Glenn Kelly (1x2pf, 3f) 0-5, Niall Mannion, Brian Moran 0-3 each, Cillian McDaid 0-2, Lee Kenny, Darragh Burke, P Mullins 0-1 each.	Stadium: Tuam Stadium; Referee: James Molloy

=== Quarter-finals ===
26/09/2026 Quarter-final	Corofin	0-15 (15) – (9) 1-06	Monivea/Abbey	Tuam
3.15 PM	Darragh Silke (2pf, 2p) 0-5, Jason Leonard (2x2p) 0-4, Dylan McHugh (2p), Ross Coen, Jack McCabe (2f) 0-2 each.	Report	Trevor Mullins 1-0, Glenn Kelly (2pf), Lee Kenny (2p) 0-2 each, Darragh Burke, Brian Moran 0-1 each.	Stadium: Tuam Stadium; Referee: Anthony Coyne

26/09/2026 Quarter-final	Annaghdown	1-20 (23) – (22) 2-16	Claregalway	Tuam
5 PM	Damien Comer (2p, 2f) 1-4, Diarmuid Kilcommins, Stephen Curley (2f) 0-5 each, James Healy (2x2pf) 0-4, John McDonnell, Eoin Reddington 0-1 each.	Report	Conor Flaherty (pen, 2x2pf, 1f) 1-8, Jack Mullen 1-1, Jack Lonergan (2p), Daniel Fitzmaurice 0-2 each, Eamonn McGrath ('45'), Jack Glynn, Brian Connolly 0-1 each.	Stadium: Tuam Stadium; Referee: Shane Curley

27/09/2026 Quarter-final	Salthill/Knocknacarra	3-21 (30) – (17) 1-14	Oughterard	Galway
3.15 PM	Robert Finnerty (1f) 3-5, Cathal Sweeney (1x2p) 0-4, Daniel O'Flaherty, Matthew Thompson, Mikey Mullery 0-2 each, Ruairí Lavelle ('45'), Dara Conneely, John Maher, Brian Conlon, Cillian O'Toole, Daniel Hoare 0-1 each.	Report	Niall Lee (1x2p, 1x2pf) 1-6, Eric Lee (1x2p) 0-3, James Lowry (2p) 0-2, Ciarán Noone ('45'), Cian Monaghan, Ryan Monaghan 0-1 each.	Stadium: Pearse Stadium; Referee: Austin O'Connell

27/09/2026 Quarter-final	Moycullen	3-25 (34) – (13) 0-13	Mountbellew/Moylough	Galway
5 PM	Fionn McDonagh 1-7 (2p), Fiachra McDonagh 1-2, Dessie Conneely (2p, 2x'45', 1f) 0-5, Owen Gallagher (2x2p) 0-4, Charlie Cox 1-0, Seán Kelly (2p), James McLaughlin (2p) 0-3 each, Seán O'Connor 0-1.	Report	Barry McHugh (2x2pf, 3f) 0-7, Billy Mannion (2p) 0-2, John Daly, Ciarán Mulhern, Eoin Finnerty, Fionn Colleran 0-1 each.	Stadium: Pearse Stadium; Referee: Thomas Murphy

=== Semi-finals ===
11/10/2026 Semi-final	Moycullen	4-26 (38) – (8) 0-08	Annaghdown	Galway
2:15 PM	Dessie Conneely (6f, 4x2pf) 2-16, Niall Walsh (2p) 1-2, Peter Cooke 1-0, Paul Kelly, Fionn McDonagh (1f), Owen Gallagher 0-2 each, Ger Daveron (m), Cillian Gallagher 0-1 each.	Report	Stephen Curley (3f) 0-3, Darragh Meehan, Enda Mullarkey (2p) 0-2 each, Damien Comer 0-1.	Stadium: Pearse Stadium; Referee: Anthony Coyne

11/10/2026 Semi-final	Corofin	2-07 (13) – (15) 0-15	Salthill/Knocknacarra	Galway
4 PM	Shane Canavan, Jason Leonard 1-0 each, Kieran Molloy (2p) 0-3, Dylan McHugh (2p) 0-2, Micheál Lundy, Ross Coen 0-1 each.	Report	Robert Finnerty (2x2p, 3f) 0-9, Daniel O'Flaherty (2p), Matthew Thompson (2p) 0-2 each, Tomo Culhane, Cillian O'Toole 0-1 each.	Stadium: Pearse Stadium; Referee: Christopher Ryan

=== Final ===
25/10/2026 Final	Moycullen	1-14 (17) – (18) 2-12	Salthill/Knocknacarra	Galway
4 PM	Dessie Conneely (2p, 2f) 0-6, Niall Walsh (2p) 0-5, Paul Kelly 1-0, Peter Cooke (2p) 0-2, Owen Gallagher 0-1.	Report	Tomo Culhane (2x2p, 2f) 1-6, Colm Finnerty 1-1, Matthew Thompson 0-2, Paddy Kitt, Mark Mannion, Daniel O'Flaherty 0-1 each.	Stadium: Pearse Stadium; Referee: Shane Curley

=== Top scorers ===
Overall

Rank	Player	Club	Tally	Total	Matches	Average
1	Glenn Kelly	Monivea-Abbey	2-26	32	3	10.6
2	Niall Walsh	Moycullen	3-14	23	3	4.6
3	Darragh Silke	Corofin	2-16	22	3	7.3
4	Robert Finnerty	Salthill Knocknacarra	2-14	20	3	6.6
5	Colm Costello	Dunmore MacHales	4-06	18	3	6
6	Niall Lee	Oughterard	2-11	17	3	5.6
7	Alan Naughton	Caltra	1-13	16	3	5.3
7	Jack Nolan	St James	1-13	16	3	5.3
9	Padraig Costello	Dunmore MacHales	1-12	15	3	5
10	Luke Davin	Tuam Stars	1-09	12	3	4
