= 2017 Galway Senior Football Championship =

Galway S.F.C.
- Season: 2017
- Champions: Corofin (19th title)
- Winning Captain: Ciaran McGrath
- Man Of The Match: Dylan Wall
- Winning Manager: Kevin O'Brien
- Connacht SCFC: ???

The 2017 Galway Senior Football Championship is the 122nd edition of Galway GAA's premier Gaelic football tournament for senior graded clubs in County Galway, Ireland. The winners receive the Frank Fox Cup and represent Galway in the Connacht Senior Club Football Championship.

Twenty teams compete. The championship has a back-door format for the first two rounds before proceeding to a knock-out format. Generally, any team to lose two matches will be knocked out of the championship.

Corofin were the defending champions after they defeated Salthill/Knocknacarra in the previous year's final.

This was Monivea-Abbey's return the senior grade.

== Team changes ==
The following teams have changed division since the 2016 championship season.

=== To S.F.C. ===
Promoted from 2016 Galway Intermediate Football Championship

- Monivea-Abbey - (Intermediate Champions)

=== From S.F.C. ===
Relegated to 2018 Galway Intermediate Football Championship

- Cárna-Caiseal

== Rounds 1 to 3 ==
=== Round 1 ===
All 20 teams enter the competition in this round. The 10 winners progress to Round 2A while the 10 losers progress to Round 2B.

11 May 2017
Round 1

Leitir Móir	2-13 - 1-14	St Michael's
Aonghus Ó Fatharta 1-3, Patrick Marc Ó Fatharta 0-4, Iarla Ó Curraoin 1-0, Ferdia Breathnach 0-3, Eamonn Ó Loingsigh 0-2, Colm MacDonnacha 0-1	Report	Eamonn Brannigan 0-6 (0-1f), Eddie Hoare 0-3 (0-2f), Keith Ward 1-0, Greg Rogan 0-2f, Alan Glynn, Frank Daly, Michael Feeney 0-1 each

Pearse Stadium

13 May 2017
Round 1

Annaghdown	3-14 - 0-3	Killererin

Tuam Stadium

13 May 2017
Round 1

Mountbellew-Moylough	0-11 - 0-7	Carraroe

Pearse Stadium

14 May 2017
Round 1

Moycullen	4-15 - 1-15	Míchael Breathnach

Pearse Stadium

14 May 2017
Round 1

Salthill-Knocknacarra	5-12 - 1-12	Milltown
Andrew Butler 2-2, Brian Conlon 1-3, Evan Murphy 1-2, Robert Finnerty 1-1, Sean Armstrong 0-3 (0-1f), Shane Kelly 0-1

Tuam Stadium

14 May 2017
Round 1

St James'	1-17 - 0-6	Caltra
Eoin Concannon 1-5, Paul Conroy 0-4, Johnny Duane, Tommy Walsh, Mike Fahy, Neil Lydon, Alan Murphy, Owen Teagle, David O'Connell, Oisin O'Malley 0-1 each

Athenry

14 May 2017
Round 1

Tuam Stars	0-15 - 0-12	Killanin
	Report

Pearse Stadium

14 May 2017
Round 1

Caherlistrane	1-12 - 1-8	Barna
Cormac Bane 0-5 (2f), Stephen Lawless 1-2, Ronan Conneely 0-3, Oisin O Brien 0-2.

Corofin

14 May 2017
Round 1

Corofin	2-15 - 0-8	Cortoon Shamrocks

Tuam Stadium

14 May 2017
Round 1

Monivea-Abbey	1-12 - 0-11	Kilconly

Athenry

=== Round 2 ===
==== Round 2A ====
The 10 winners from Round 1 enter this round. The 5 winners will enter the draw for the Preliminary Quarter Finals while the 5 losers will play in Round 3.

2017
17 June 2017
Round 2A

Caherlistrane	2-13 - 1-13	St James'
Stephen Bohan 0-1, Stephen Lawless 0-1, Barry McCabe 0-2, Oisin O Brien 0-1, Ronan Conneely 1-2, Kevin Nally 0-2, Cormac Bane 1-4

Athenry

17 June 2017
Round 2A

Tuam Stars	2-10 - 0-12	Salthill-Knocknacarra

Athenry

17 June 2017
Round 2A

Annaghdown	0-14 - 0-10	Mountbellew-Moylough

Tuam Stadium

17 June 2017
Round 2A

Corofin	2-17 - 0-11	Moycullen

Pearse Stadium

18 June 2017
Round 2A

Monivea-Abbey	2-12 - 1-9	Leitir Móir

Pearse Stadium

==== Round 2B ====
The 10 losers from Round 1 enter this round. The 5 winners will go into the Round 3 while the 5 losers will enter the Relegation Playoffs.

17 June 2017
Round 2B

Killanin	2-10 - 0-11	Cortoon Shamrocks

Pearse Stadium

17 June 2017
Round 2B

Kilconly	3-9 - 1-13	Carraroe

Clonbur

18 June 2017
Round 2B

Míchael Breathnach	1-10 - 0-8	Barna

Pearse Stadium

18 June 2017
Round 2B

St Michael's	0-15 - 1-9	Killererin

Corofin

18 June 2017
Round 2B

Milltown	0-10 - 0-7	Caltra

Tuam Stadium

=== Round 3 ===
The 5 losers from Round 2A enter this round and they play the 5 winners from Round 2B. The 5 winners will go into the draw for the Preliminary Quarter-Finals while the 5 losers will enter the Relegation Playoffs.

26 August 2017
Round 3

Mountbellew-Moylough	2-17 - 0-11	Milltown
Michael Daly 1-4, Barry McHugh 0-6 (0-4f), Paul Donnellan 1-1, Cathal Kenny and Colm Mannion 0-2 each, Joe Bergin and Colin Ryan 0-1 each		Michael Martin (0-2f) and Liam Costello 0-3 each, Mark Hehir 0-2f, C Brennan, Damien Brennan, Cathal Blake 0-1 each

Tuam Stadium
Referee: James Molloy

26 August 2017
Round 3

Leitir Móir	2-11 - 1-11	Kilconly
Iarla Ó Curraoin 2-2 (0-1f, 1 '45), Daithí MacDonnacha 0-5, Ferdia Breathnach and Maolra MacDonnacha 0-2 each		Michael Murphy 0-8 (0-5f), Kevin Brady 1-0 pen, Caolan McCafferty, Teddy Kerrigan, Niall Daly 0-1 each

Clonbur
Referee: Frank Kinneen

26 August 2017
Round 3

Moycullen	1-11 - 0-13	Killanin
Peter Cooke 0-7 (0-4f, 1 '45), Conor Bohan 1-0 pen, Phillip Lydon 0-2, David Wynne (0-1f) and Mark Lydon 0-1 each		Enda Kelly 0-5 (0-4f), Niall Walsh 0-3, Cathal Sweeney and Patrick Sweeney 0-2 each, Johnny Heaney 0-1

Pearse Stadium
Referee: Richard McNicholas

27 August 2017
Round 3

St James'	2-9 - 0-12	Míchael Breathanach
Neil Lydon and Mike Fahy 1-0 each, Paul Conroy (0-2f) and Eoin Concannon (0-1f) 0-3 each, Eoghan O'Regan 0-2, Cathal O'Regan 0-1		Pete Kenny 0-4f, Ronan McDonagh 0-2f, Barry Ó Conghaile, Diarmuid Feeney, Joe Conroy, Seán Denvir, Gearoid Willie Ó Fátharta, Cian Ó Gríofa 0-1 each

Pearse Stadium
Referee: Gearóid Ó Conámha

27 August 2017
Round 3

Salthill Knocknacarra	0-17 - 1-12	St Michael's
Sean Armstrong 0-9 (0-3f), Tadhg Haran, Evan Murphy, Brian Conlon 0-2 each, Conor Halloran and Marcus Mac Donnachadha 0-1 each		Eddie Hoare 0-3 (0-1f), Aghabue-Ayo Osas 1-0, Éamonn Brannigan and Keith Ward 0-2 each, Frank Daly, Damian Connaughton, Shane Maloney, Eamon O'Donnell, Greg Rogan (0-1f) 0-1 each

Pearse Stadium

== Knockout stage ==
=== Preliminary Quarter-Finals ===
The 5 Round 2A winners and the 5 Round 3 winners are entered into a draw to choose 4 teams to play in this round. The 2 winners (along with the 6 teams who receive byes) will proceed to the quarter-finals.

26 August 2017
4:45pm
Preliminary Quarter-Final

Tuam Stars	1-13 - 1-10	Caherlistrane

Tuam Stadium
Referee: Noel Dempsey

2 September 2017
3:45pm
Preliminary Quarter-Final

Corofin	1-18 - 2-12	Salthill-Knocknacarra

Tuam Stadium
Referee: Martin Flaherty

Annaghdown	-vs-	Bye

Mountbellew-Moylough	-vs-	Bye

Naomh Anna Leitir Móir	-vs-	Bye

Moycullen	-vs-	Bye

St James'	-vs-	Bye

=== Quarter-finals ===
The 2 winners from the Preliminary Quarter-Finals (along with the 6 teams who received byes) enter the quarter-finals.

9 September 2017
5:45 pm
Quarter-Final

Monivea-Abbey	3-9 - 1-10	Tuam Stars
James Mannion 1-1, Paul Flaherty 1-1, Stephen Walsh 1-1, Paddy Mullins 0-3 (0-2f), Brian Flaherty, Cillian McDaid, Rory O'Connor 0-1 each		Joseph Lowry 1-1, Jamie Murphy 0-3f, Alan O'Connell and Cormac McWalter 0-2 each, Shane Curtin (1 '45) and Seamus Kelly 0-1 each

Corofin
Referee: Kieran Quinn

9 September 2017
6:00 pm
Quarter-Final

Mountbellew-Moylough	3-20 - 0-10	St James'
Barry McHugh 0-8 (0-3f, 1 '45), Cathal Kenny 1-2, Paul Donnellan and Stephen Boyle 1-1 each, Joe Bergin and Michael Daly 0-3 each, Colm Mannion and Ger Donoghue 0-1 each		Eoin Concannon 0-6 (0-4f), Paul Conroy 0-3 (0-2f), Eoghan O'Regan 0-1

Tuam Stadium
Referee: Shane Hehir

10 September 2017
2:00 pm
Quarter-Final

Corofin	4-13 - 2-8	Moycullen
Ian Burke 2-3, Michael Farragher 2-0, Gary Sice 0-3 (0-2f), Martin Farragher, Jason Leonard (0-1f), Justin Burke 0-2 each, Ronan Steede 0-1		Conor Bohan 2-0 (1-0 pen), Peter Cooke 0-5 (0-2f), David Wynne, Eoin Walsh, Dessie Conneely 0-1 each

Pearse Stadium
Referee: Tommy Faherty

10 September 2017
3:45 pm
Quarter-Final

Annaghdown	3-13 - 0-10	Leitir Móir
Frankie Burke 2-6 (0-3f), Conor Moloney 1-2, Damien Comer 0-2, TJ Forde (1 '45), Jonathan Creaven, Keith Greaney 0-1 each		Iarla Ó Curraoin 0-6 (0-4f, 1 '45), Pádraig Mac an Rí, Eamonn Ó Loingsigh (1 '45), Maitias Barrett, Aonghus Ó Fátharta 0-1 each

Pearse Stadium
Referee: James Molloy

=== Semi-finals ===
24 September 2017
2:00 pm
Semi-Final

Corofin	0-11 - 1-7	Annaghdown
Jason Leonard 0-4 (0-2f), Justin Burke 0-3, Kieran Molloy, Liam Silke, Gary Sice (0-1f), Ian Burke 0-1 each	av	Frankie Burke 1-0 pen, Damien Comer 0-3 (0-1f), TJ Forde (1 '45), Darragh Meehan, Jonathan Creaven, Conor Moloney 0-1 each

Tuam Stadium
Referee: James Molloy

24 September 2017
3:45 pm
Semi-Final

Mountbellew-Moylough	3-15 - 1-4	Monivea-Abbey
Barry McHugh 2-4 (1-0 pen, 0-4f), Michael Daly 0-4, Paul Donnellon 1-0, Joe Bergin 0-3, Eoin Finnerty 0-2, Colm Mannion and Joe Meehan (0-1f) 0-1 each		Paddy Mullins 0-4f and Craig Kennedy 1-0

Tuam Stadium
Referee: Gearoid Ó Conamha

=== Final ===
15 October 2017; 4:00 pm Final	Corofin	2-14 - 0-10	Mountbellew-Moylough	Tuam Stadium; Referee: Muiris Mac Gearailt (Micheal Breathnach); Man of the Match: Dylan Wall
15 October 2017; 4:00 pm Final	Jason Leonard 0-6 (0-4f), Martin Farragher 1-1, Conor Cunningham 1-0, Ronan Steede 0-2 and Gary Sice (0-1f) 0-2 each, Michael Farragher, Dylan Wall, Ian Burke 0-1 each	Report av	Barry McHugh 0-6 (0-4f), Paul Donnelan 0-2, Joe Bergin and Eoin Finnerty 0-1 each	Tuam Stadium; Referee: Muiris Mac Gearailt (Micheal Breathnach); Man of the Match: Dylan Wall

=== Last Ten ===
Preliminary Quarter-Finals
Corofin	1-18
Salthill/Knocknacarra	2-12
Tuam Stars	1-13
Caherlistrane	1-10

Quarter-Finals
Corofin	4-13
Moycullen	2-8
Annaghdown	3-13
Leitir Móir	0-10
Mountbellew/Moylough	3-20
St James'	0-10
Tuam Stars	1-10
Monivea-Abbey	3-9

Semi-Finals
Corofin	0-11
Annaghdown	1-7
Mountbellew/Moylough	3-15
Monivea-Abbey	1-4

Final
Corofin	2-14
Mountbellew/Moylough	0-10

== Relegation Playoffs ==
The 5 Round 2B losers and 5 Round 3 losers enter the Relegation Playoff.

=== Relegation preliminary round ===
A draw was conducted and 4 teams were chosen to play in the Relegation Preliminary Round. The 2 winners earn their place in the S.F.C. for 2017 while the losers enter the Relegation Quarter-Finals along with the 6 clubs who received byes.

10 September 2017
2:00 pm
Relegation preliminary round

Milltown	2-12 - 0-13	Kilconly

Tuam Stadium
Referee: Gearóid O'Conamha

1 October 2017
3:00 pm
Relegation preliminary round

St Michael's	0-13 - 0-10	Mícheál Breathnach

Spiddal
Referee: Gerry Daly

=== Relegation Quarter-Finals ===
The 2 Relegation Preliminary Round losers enter the Relegation Quarter-Finals along with the 6 clubs who received byes. The 4 winners will earn their place in the 2017 S.F.C. while the 4 losers will enter the Relegation Semi-Finals.

9 September 2017
4:00 pm
Relegation Quarter-Final

Killererin	1-7 - 0-8	Barna

Corofin
Referee: Frank Kinneen

9 September 2017
6:00 pm
Relegation Quarter-Final

Killanin	3-18 - 3-10	Carraroe

Pearse Stadium
Referee: Richard McNicholas

16 September 2017
5:30 pm
Relegation Quarter-Final

Cortoon Shamrocks	1-12 - 1-7	Kilconly

Tuam Stadium
Referee: Gerry Daly

22 October 2017
2:00 pm
Relegation Quarter-Final

Caltra	1-14 - 0-8	Mícheál Breathnach

Pearse Stadium
Referee: Richard McNicholas

=== Relegation Semi-Finals ===
The 4 Relegation Quarter-Final losers play against each other in this round. The 2 winners will earn their place in the 2017 S.F.C. while the 2 losers will enter the Relegation Final.

22 October 2017
3:45 pm
Relegation Semi-Final

Barna	2-17 - 0-11	Kilconly

Pearse Stadium
Referee: Martin Flaherty

28 October 2017
2:00 pm
Relegation Semi-Final

Carraroe	1-12 - 1-10	Mícheál Breathnach

Pearse Stadium
Referee: Gearoid Ó Conamha

=== Relegation Final ===
The winner will earn their place in the 2017 S.F.C. while the loser will be relegated to the Intermediate grade.

2 December 2017
2:00pm
Final

Mícheál Breathnach	3-08 - 2-13	Kilconly
	Report

The Prairie, Salthill
Referee: Frank Kineen
