= 2015 Galway Senior Football Championship =

Galway S.F.C.
- Season: 2015
- Champions: Corofin (17th Title)
- Relegated: Kilkerrin-Clonberne
- All Ireland SCFC: Ballyboden St Enda's
- Winning Captain: Michael Farragher
- Man of the Match: Ronan Steede
- Winning Manager: Stephen Rochford
- Connacht SCFC: Castlebar Mitchels

The 2015 Galway Senior Football Championship is the 120th edition of the Galway GAA's premier club Gaelic football tournament for senior graded teams in County Galway, Ireland. The tournament consists of 21 teams (N.U.I.G. only enter at the Preliminary Quarter-Final Stage), with the winner going on to represent Galway in the Connacht Senior Club Football Championship. The championship has a back-door format for the first two rounds before proceeding to a knock-out format. Generally, any team to lose two matches will be knocked out of the championship.

All-Ireland champions Corofin were the defending champions after they defeated St Michael's in the previous years final, and they successfully defended their title and also claimed a three-in-a-row of titles when beating Mountbellew-Moylough in the final at Tuam Stadium on 11 October 2015 by 3-13 to 0-12.

This was Killanin's first year back in the senior grade and they made it all the way to a Quarter-Final, losing narrowly to Salthill-Knocknacarra.

Kilkerrin-Clonberne were relegated to the Intermediate grade after 18 years in the top flight.

== Team changes ==
The following teams have changed division since the 2014 championship season.

=== To S.F.C. ===
Promoted from I.F.C.

- Killanin – (Intermediate Champions)

=== From S.F.C. ===
Relegated to I.F.C.

- Menlough

== Round 1 ==
All 20 teams enter the competition in this round. The 10 winners progress to Round 2A while the 10 losers progress to Round 2B.

23 May 2015
3.00pm
Round 1

Corofin	0-15 – 2-6	Salthill-Knocknacarra

Kenny Park
Referee: Martin Flaherty

23 May 2015
5.30pm
Round 1

Caherlistrane GAC	0-13 – 1-8	Milltown

Tuam Stadium
Referee: Noel Dempsey

23 May 2015
7.00pm
Round 1

Kilkerrin-Clonberne	1-15 – 1-13	Caltra

Duggan Park
Referee: Gearoid O Conamha

23 May 2015
7.15pm
Round 1

Cárna-Caiseal	1-15 – 1-13	Annaghdown

Pearse Stadium
Referee: Brendan Kinneavy

23 May 2015
7.15pm
Round 1

Mountbellew-Moylough GAA	1-6 – 0-8	St James'

Tuam Stadium
Referee: Tommy Faherty

24 May 2015
1.45pm
Round 1

Killanin	1-10 – 1-8	Barna

Moycullen
Referee: Noel Dempsey

24 May 2015
3.45pm
Round 1

Cortoon Shamrocks	1-13 – 0-12	St Michael's

Tuam Stadium
Referee: Muiris Mac Gearailt

24 May 2015
4.00pm
Round 1

Míchael Breathnach	1-15 – 1-13	Carraroe

Pearse Stadium
Referee: Gerry Guinan

24 May 2015
5.30pm
Round 1

Tuam Stars	0-16 – 1-10	Kilconly

Tuam Stadium
Referee: Ger Chaill

24 May 2015
5.45pm
Round 1

Naomh Anna Leitir Móir	0-15 – 0-14	Killererin

Pearse Stadium
Referee: Frank Kinneen

== Round 2 ==
=== Round 2A ===
The 10 winners from Round 1 enter this round. The 5 winners will enter the draw for the Preliminary Quarter Finals while the 5 losers will play in Round 3.

20 June 2015
5.30pm
Round 2A

Mountbellew-Moylough GAA	1-12 – 1-9	Killanin

Pearse Stadium
Referee: ???

20 June 2015
7.00pm
Round 2A

Tuam Stars	1-12 – 0-8	Cárna-Caiseal

Moycullen
Referee: Kieran Quinn

20 June 2015
7.15pm
Round 2A

Cortoon Shamrocks	1-12 – 0-10	Naomh Anna Leitir Móir

Pearse Stadium
Referee: Noel Dempsey

20 June 2015
7.00pm
Round 2A

Caherlistrane	0-15 – 0-11	Kilkerrin-Clonberne

Tuam Stadium
Referee: Frank Kinneen

21 June 2015
4.35pm
Round 2A

Corofin	2-8 – 1-9	Míchael Breathnach

Pearse Stadium
Referee: James Molloy

=== Round 2B ===
The 10 losers from Round 1 enter this round. The 5 winners will go into the Round 3 while the 5 losers will enter the Relegation Playoffs.

20 June 2015
5.30pm
Round 2B

Annaghdown	0-14 – 0-6	Barna

Moycullen
Referee: Gerry Daly

21 June 2015
3.00pm
Round 2B

Carraroe	4-14 – 1-3	St Michael's

Pearse Stadium
Referee: Martin Flaherty

21 June 2015
5.15pm
Round 2B

Salthill-Knocknacarra	3-10 – 1-13	Milltown

Tuam Stadium
Referee: Frank Kinneen

21 June 2015
6.30pm
Round 2B

Caltra	0-9 – 1-5	Kilconly

Annaghdown
Referee: Tommy Faherty

21 June 2015
7.00pm
Round 2B

Killererin	3-12 – 2-14	St James'

Tuam Stadium
Referee: Gearoid O Conamha

== Round 3 ==
The 5 losers from Round 2A enter this round and they play the 5 winners from Round 2B. The 5 winners will go into the draw for the Preliminary Quarter-Finals while the 5 losers will enter the Relegation Playoffs.

12 July 2015
1.45pm
Round 3

Carraroe	3-9 – 0-9	Cárna-Caiseal

Pearse Stadium
Referee: James Molloy

8 August 2015
7.00pm
Round 3

Annaghdown	0-11 – 0-7	Míchael Breathnach

Pearse Stadium
Referee: Frank Kinneen

9 August 2015
3.45pm
Round 3

Killanin	7-9 – 2-10	Killererin

Pearse Stadium
Referee: Gearoid O Conamha

9 August 2015
5.45pm
Round 3

Salthill-Knocknacarra	1-11 – 0-9	Kilkerrin-Clonberne

Tuam Stadium
Referee: Shane Hehir

23 August 2015
6.00pm
Round 3

Naomh Anna Leitir Móir	1-12 – 0-13	Caltra

Pearse Stadium
Referee: Shane Hehir

== Preliminary Quarter-Finals ==
The 5 Round 2A winners, the 5 Round 3 winners and N.U.I.G. enter the competition at this stage. A draw was conducted to choose 6 of these teams to play in this round. The 3 winners (along with the 5 teams who receive byes) will proceed to the quarter-finals.

22 August 2015
6.45pm
Preliminary Quarter-Final

Tuam Stars	4-11 – 1-6	Caherlistrane

Pearse Stadium
Referee: James Molloy

23 August 2015
5.30pm
Preliminary Quarter-Final

Carraroe	w/o – scr	N.U.I.G.

Moycullen
Referee: Brendan Kinneavy

30 August 2015
4.30pm
Preliminary Quarter-Final

Killanin	3-9 – 2-10	Naomh Anna Leitir Móir

Pearse Stadium
Referee: Martin Flaherty

== Quarter-finals ==
The 3 winners from the Preliminary Quarter-Finals (along with the 5 teams who received byes) enter the quarter-finals.

29 August 2015
4.45pm
Quarter-Final

Corofin	0-11 – 1-8	Tuam Stars

Tuam Stadium
Referee: James Molloy

30 August 2015
6.00pm
Quarter-Final

Mountbellew-Moylough GAA	2-16 – 2-6	Annaghdown

Tuam Stadium
Referee: Tommy Faherty

30 August 2015
6.15pm
Quarter-Final

Cortoon Shamrocks	4-14 – 2-8	Carraroe

Pearse Stadium
Referee: Frank Kinneen

12 August 2015
6.00pm
Quarter-Final

Salthill-Knocknacarra	0-12 – 1-6	Killanin

Pearse Stadium
Referee: Martin Flaherty

13 September 2015
2.00pm
Quarter-Final Replay

Corofin	2-9 – 0-11	Tuam Stars

Tuam Stadium
Referee: Frank Kinneen

== Semi-finals ==
27 September 2015
2.30pm
Semi-Final

Corofin	2-11 – 0-7	Cortoon Shamrocks

Tuam Stadium
Referee: Martin Flaherty

27 September 2015
4.15pm
Semi-Final

Mountbellew-Moylough	1-12 – 1-7	Salthill-Knocknacarra

Tuam Stadium
Referee: Tommy Faherty

== Final ==
11 October 2015; 3.00 pm Final	Corofin	3-13 – 0-12	Mountbellew-Moylough	Tuam Stadium; Referee: Shane Hehir; Man of the Match: Ronan Steede
11 October 2015; 3.00 pm Final		Report		Tuam Stadium; Referee: Shane Hehir; Man of the Match: Ronan Steede

Preliminary Quarter-Finals
Tuam Stars	4-11
Caherlistrane	1-6
Carraroe	w/o
N.U.I.G.	scr
Killanin	3-9
Naomh Anna Leitir Móir	2-10

Quarter-Finals
Corofin	2-9 R
Tuam Stars	0-11
Cortoon Shamrocks	4-14
Carraroe	2-8
Salthill-Knocknacarra	0-12
Killanin	1-6
Mountbellew-Moylough	2-16
Annaghdown	2-6

Semi-Finals
Corofin	2-11
Cortoon Shamrocks	0-7
Salthill-Knocknacarra	1-7
Mountbellew-Moylough	1-12

Final
Corofin	3-13
Mountbellew-Moylough	0-12

== Relegation Playoff ==
The 5 Round 2B losers and 5 Round 3 losers enter the Relegation Playoff.

=== Relegation preliminary round ===
A draw was conducted and 4 teams were chosen to play in the Relegation Preliminary Round. The 2 winners earn their place in the S.F.C. for 2016 while the losers enter the Relegation Quarter-Final along with the 6 clubs who received byes.

22 August 2015
5.00pm
Relegation preliminary round

Míchael Breathnach	3-17 – 4-10 (a.e.t.)	Killererin

The Prairie
Referee: Frank Kinneen

22 August 2015
5.00pm
Relegation preliminary round

Cárna-Caiseal	2-10 – 1-8	Kilkerrin-Clonberne

Clonbur
Referee: Kieran Quinn

=== Relegation Quarter-Final ===
The 2 Relegation Preliminary Round losers enter the Relegation Quarter-Final along with the 6 clubs who received byes. The 4 winners will earn their place in the 2016 S.F.C. while the 2 losers will enter the Relegation Semi-Finals.

29 August 2015
6.30pm
Relegation Quarter-Final

St James'	2-15 – 1-8	Kilconly

Tuam Stadium
Referee: Noel Dempsey

12 September 2015
3.00pm
Relegation Quarter-Final

Killererin	2-10 – 1-12	Kilkerrin-Clonberne

Tuam Stadium
Referee: Gearoid O Conamha

12 September 2015
5.15pm
Relegation Quarter-Final

Milltown	1-6 – 0-7	St Michael's

Tuam Stadium
Referee: Richard McNicholas

3 October 2015
5.00pm
Relegation Quarter-Final

Caltra	0-15 – 1-10	Barna

Pearse Stadium
Referee: Frank Kinneen

=== Relegation Semi-Final ===
The 4 Relegation Quarter-Final losers play against each other in this round. The 2 winners will earn their place in the 2016 S.F.C. while the 2 losers will enter the Relegation Final.

9 October 2015
9.00pm
Relegation Semi-Final

St Michael's	2-8 – 0-8	Kilconly

Corofin
Referee: Martin Flaherty

10 October 2015
5.00pm
Relegation Semi-Final

Barna	3-12 – 2-6	Kilkerrin-Clonberne

Annaghdown
Referee: Gearoid O Conamha

=== Relegation Final ===
The winner will earn their place in the 2016 S.F.C. while the loser will be relegated to the Intermediate grade.

31 October 2015
3.00pm
Relegation Final

Kilconly	2-13 – 2-11	Kilkerrin-Clonberne

Tuam Stadium
Referee: Frank Kinneen
