= 2020 Galway Senior Football Championship =

Galway Senior Football Championship
- Season: 2020
- Champions: Moycullen (1st title)
- Relegated: Mícheál Breathnach
- Winning Captain: Dessie Conneely
- Man of The Match: Dessie Conneely
- Winning Manager: Don Connellan

The 2020 Galway Senior Football Championship is the 125th edition of Galway GAA's premier Gaelic football tournament for senior graded clubs in County Galway, Ireland. The winners receive the Frank Fox Cup but will not represent Galway in the Connacht Senior Club Football Championship, which was cancelled for 2020 due to the impact of the COVID-19 pandemic on Gaelic games.

Eighteen teams compete in the competition. This year's format was originally planned to mirror last year's format with the draw being carried out in February 2020. However due to the emergence of the COVID-19 pandemic, the format was altered to reduce the number of matches to be played. A new draw was made on 3 July 2020 to compensate for these changes.

Corofin were the defending champions for the sixth consecutive year after they defeated Tuam Stars after a replay in the 2019 final. The holders were beaten by Mountbellew/Moylough in the Semi Final that ended a remarkable 49 game unbeaten run in the championship dating back to 2012.

This was All Ireland I.C.F.C. champions Oughterard's return the senior grade for the first time in 17 seasons (since their relegation from the S.F.C. in 2002) after they claimed to 2019 I.F.C. title. They were promoted along with the I.F.C. finalists Michael Breathnach's, who return to the Senior grade after their relegation in 2017.

== Team changes ==
The following teams have changed division since the 2019 championship season.

=== To S.F.C. ===
Promoted from 2019 Galway I.F.C.

- Oughterard – (Intermediate champions)
- Micheál Breathnachs – (Intermediate finalists)

=== From S.F.C. ===
Relegated to 2020 Galway I.F.C.

- Killererin
- Naomh Anna Leitir Móir

== Group stage ==
There are four groups called Group 1, 2, 3 and 4. Groups 1, 2 and 3 each contain four teams drawn randomly. The 1st and 2nd placed teams in each of these groups will qualify for the quarter-finals, while the 4th placed team will proceed to the Relegation Semi-Finals. Group 4 is divided into two sub-groups called Group 4A and Group 4B, each containing 3 teams. The 1st and 2nd placed teams in Group 4A will play the 2nd and 1st placed teams in Group 4B, with the two winners qualifying for the quarter-finals. The 3rd placed team in both Group 4A and 4B will play-off, with the loser proceeding to the Relegation Semi-Finals.

=== Group 1 ===
Pos	Team	Pld	W	D	L	PF	PA	PD	Pts
1	Barna	3	3	0	0	39	32	+7	6
2	Salthill/Knocknacarra	3	1	1	1	49	39	+10	3
3	St Michael's	3	1	0	2	33	45	−12	2
4	An Spidéal	3	0	1	2	36	41	−5	1

Updated to match(es) played on unknown. Source:

Round 1

1/8/2020
7 30 PM

Barna	2–7 (13) – (10) 0–10	An Spidéal

Maigh Cuilinn
Referee: Ronan McNulty
2/8/2020
2 30 PM

Salthill/Knocknacarra	3–13 (22) – (10) 0–10	St. Michael's

Pearse Stadium
Referee: Austin O'Connell

Round 2

14/8/2020
4 30 PM

Salthill/Knocknacarra	0–11 (11) – (13) 0–13	Barna

Pearse Stadium
Referee: Gearoid O'Conamha
15/8/2020
3 30 PM

St Michael's	1-09 (12) – (10) 0–10	An Spidéal

Pearse Stadium
Referee: Martin Flaherty

Round 3

30/8/2020
1 30 PM

Salthill/Knocknacarra	0-16 (16) – (16) 1-13	An Spidéal

Maigh Cuilinn
Referee: Martin Flaherty
30/8/2020
1 30 PM

St Michael's	0–11 (11) – (13) 0–13	Barna

Pearse Stadium
Referee: Anthony Coyne

=== Group 2 ===
Pos	Team	Pld	W	D	L	PF	PA	PD	Pts
1	Maigh Cuilinn (C)	3	3	0	0	68	41	+27	6
2	Mountbellew/Moylough	3	2	0	1	44	47	−3	4
3	Annaghdown	3	1	0	2	46	45	+1	2
4	Micheál Breathnach's (R)	3	0	0	3	36	61	−25	0

Updated to match(es) played on unknown. Source:

Round 1

1/8/2020
2 30 PM

Maigh Cuilinn	2–7 (13) – (10) 0–10	Micheál Breathnach's

Pearse Stadium
Referee: Anthony Coyne
2/8/2020
6 00 PM

Mountbellew/Moylough	1–7 (10) – (8) 0–8	Annaghdown

Tuam Stadium
Referee: James Molloy

Round 2

15/8/2020
6 30 PM

Annaghdown	2–14 (20) – (21) 4-09	Maigh Cuilinn

Pearse Stadium
Referee: Frank Kinneen
16/8/2020
5 30 PM

Mountbellew/Moylough	0–22 (22) – (13) 2-07	Micheál Breathnach's

Pearse Stadium
Referee: Gerald Anthony Lohan

Round 3

28/8/2020
7 00 PM

Annaghdown	1–15 (18) – (14) 1–11	Micheál Breathnach's

The Priarie
Referee: Austin O'Connell
29/8/2020
6 00 PM

Mountbellew/Moylough	1-09 (12) – (26) 4–14	Maigh Cuilinn

Tuam Stadium
Referee: P.J. Rabbitte

=== Group 3 ===
Pos	Team	Pld	W	D	L	PF	PA	PD	Pts
1	Tuam Stars	3	2	0	1	45	39	+6	4
2	Kilannin	3	2	0	1	39	37	+2	4
3	Claregalway	3	1	0	2	49	42	+7	2
4	Caherlistrane	3	1	0	2	35	50	−15	2

Updated to match(es) played on unknown. Source:

Round 1

31/7/2020
7 30 PM

Killannin	0–11(11) – (10) 0–10	Claregalway

Pearse Stadium
Referee: Noel Dempsey
1/8/2020
7 30 PM

Caherlistrane	1–09 (12) – (10) 1-07	Tuam Stars

Tuam Stadium
Referee: Gerry Daly

Round 2

16/8/2020
6 00 PM

Tuam Stars	0–14 (14) – (12) 1-09	Killannin

Kenny Park
Referee: Thomas Murphy
16/8/2020
5 00 PM

Caherlistrane	1-09 (12) – (26) 4–14	Claregalway

Tuam Stadium
Referee: Ronan McNulty

Round 3

30/8/2020
4 30 PM

Caherlistrane	2-07 (13) – (16) 1–13	Killannin

Pearse Stadium
Referee: James Molloy
30/8/2020
4 30 PM

Tuam Stars	1–18 (21) – (15) 1–12	Claregalway

Tuam Stadium
Referee: Noel Dempsey

=== Group 4 ===
==== Group 4A ====
Pos	Team	Pld	W	D	L	PF	PA	PD	Pts
1	Corofin	2	2	0	0	68	18	+50	4
2	Oughterard	2	1	0	1	31	57	−26	2
3	Monivea/Abbey	2	0	0	2	26	50	−24	0

Updated to match(es) played on unknown. Source:

Round 1

2/8/2020
2 30 PM

Corofin	7–17(38) – (11) 0–11	Oughterard

Pearse Stadium
Referee: Thomas Murphy

Round 2

9/8/2020
2 00 PM

Corofin	4–18 (30) – (7) 0–7	Monivea/Abbey

Tuam Stadium
Referee: Gearoid O'Conamha

Round 3

16/8/2020
2 30 PM

Oughterard	2–14 (20) – (19) 2–13	Monivea/Abbey

Pearse Stadium
Referee: James Molloy

==== Group 4B ====
Pos	Team	Pld	W	D	L	PF	PA	PD	Pts
1	St James'	2	1	0	1	42	37	+5	2
2	An Cheathrú Rua	2	1	0	1	24	23	+1	2
3	Milltown	2	1	0	1	32	38	−6	2

Updated to match(es) played on unknown. Source:

Round 1

1/8/2020
5 30 PM

Milltown	0–10(10) – (9) 1–06	An Cheathrú Rua

Pearse Stadium
Referee: Martin Flaherty

Round 2

9/8/2020
2 00 PM

An Cheathrú Rua	0–15 (15) – (13) 1-10	St James'

An Spidéal
Referee: Christopher Ryan

Round 3

16/8/2020
1 00 PM

Milltown	2-16 (22) – (29) 3–20	St James'

Tuam Stadium
Referee: Shane Hehir

=== Group 4 play-offs ===
Group 4 Quarter-Final play-offs

28 August 2020 Quarter-Final play-offs	Corofin	0-16 (16) – (6) 0–06	An Cheathrú Rua	Galway
19:00 IST (UTC+1)				Venue: Pearse Stadium

29 August 2020 Quarter-Final play-offs	St James'	3–16 (25) – (17) 1–14	Oughterard	Galway
18:00 IST (UTC+1)				Venue: Pearse Stadium

Group 4 Relegation Play-Off

30 August 2020 Relegation Play-Off	Milltown	1–13 (16) – (13) 1–10	Monivea-Abbey	Galway
18:00 IST (UTC+1)				Venue: Barnaderg

== Relegation play-offs ==
=== Relegation semi-finals ===
The 4th placed teams from Groups 1, 2 and 3 along with the Group 4 relegation play-off Loser face-off in the relegation semi-finals. The two winners from these semi-finals will secure their senior status for 2021, while the two losers will proceed to the relegation final.

12 September 2020 Relegation Semi-Final	Caherlistrane	1–13 (16) – (11) 2-05	Mícheál Breathnach	Galway
??? IST (UTC+1)				Venue: Pearse Stadium

3 October 2020 Relegation semi-final	An Spidéal	1–10 (13) – (12) 0–12	Monivea-Abbey	Galway
15:30 IST (UTC+1)				Venue: Pearse Stadium
				Referee: Thomas Murphy

=== Relegation final ===
The loser of the Relegation final will be relegated to the 2021 Galway I.F.C. The winner will maintain their Senior status into 2021.

24 July 2021 Relegation final	Monivea-Abbey	2-11 (17) – (14) 1-11	Mícheál Breathnach	Galway
15:00 IST (UTC+1)				Venue: Pearse Stadium

== Knockout Stage ==
=== Quarter-finals ===
The 1st and 2nd placed teams in Groups 1, 2 and 3 along with the two Group 4 quarter-final play-off winners qualify for the quarter-finals.

Quarter-finals

Semi-finals

Final

QF 1

Corofin
1-18

SF 1

Salthill-Knocknacarra
0-09

Mountbellew-Moylough
2-13

QF 2

Corofin
1-10

Mountbellew-Moylough
2-13

Final

Killannin
1-05

Maigh Cuilinn
2-12

QF 3

Mountbellew-Moylough

1-11

Tuam Stars
0-17

SF 2

Barna
0-16

Maigh Cuilinn
3-14

QF 4

Tuam Stars
1-15

Maigh Cuilinn
1-17

St James'
2-09

12 September 2020 Quarter-final	Corofin	1–18 (21) – (9) 0-09	Salthill-Knocknacarra	Galway
14:30 IST (UTC+1)				Venue: Pearse Stadium
		Report		Referee: Austin O'Connell

1 September 2020 Quarter-inal	Tuam Stars	0–17 (17) – (16) 0–16	Barna	Galway
17:30 IST (UTC+1)				Venue: Pearse Stadium
				Referee: Gearóid Ó Conámha

13 September 2020 Quarter-final	Mountbellew–Moylough	2–13 (19) – (8) 1–5	Killanin	Galway
14:30 IST (UTC+1)				Venue: Pearse Stadium
				Referee: Ronan McNulty

13 September 2020 Quarter-final	Moycullen	1–17 (20) – (15) 2–9	St James'	Galway
17:30 IST (UTC+1)				Venue: Pearse Stadium
				Referee: Thomas Murphy

=== Semi-finals ===
27 September 2020 Semi-Final	Moycullen	3–14 (23) – (18) 1–15	Tuam Stars	Galway
13:30 IST (UTC+1)				Venue: Pearse Stadium
		Report		Referee: James Molloy

27 September 2020 Semi-Final	Mountbellew–Moylough	2–13 (19) – (12) 0–12	Corofin	Galway
16:30 IST (UTC+1)				Venue: Pearse Stadium
		Report		Referee: Thomas Murphy

=== Final ===
4 October 2020 Final	Moycullen	2–12 (18) – (14) 1–11	Mountbellew–Moylough	Galway
16:00 IST (UTC+1)		(HT: 0-07 – 0-07)		Venue: Pearse Stadium
		Report		Referee: Austin O'Connell
