= 2016 Galway Senior Football Championship =

Galway S.F.C.
- Season: 2016
- Champions: Corofin (18th Title)
- Relegated: Cárna-Caiseal
- All Ireland SCFC: Corofin
- Winning Captain: Alan Burke
- Man of the Match: Jason Leonard
- Winning Manager: Kevin O'Brien
- Connacht SCFC: Corofin

The 2016 Galway Senior Football Championship is the 121st edition of the Galway GAA's premier club Gaelic football tournament for senior graded teams in County Galway, Ireland. The tournament consists of 21 teams (N.U.I.G. only enter at the Preliminary Quarter-Final Stage), with the winner going on to represent Galway in the Connacht Senior Club Football Championship. The championship has a back-door format for the first two rounds before proceeding to a knock-out format. Generally, any team to lose two matches will be knocked out of the championship.

All-Ireland champions Corofin were the defending champions after they defeated Mountbellew/Moylough in the previous years final, and they claimed a 3-in-a-row of titles when defeating Salthill/Knocknacarra 0-16 to 0-11 in the final at Pearse Stadium on 23 October.

This was Moycullen's return the senior grade after 2 years in the Intermediate grade.

Cárna-Caiseal were relegated back to the I.F.C. for 2017 after 4 years as a senior club.

== Team changes ==
The following teams have changed division since the 2015 championship season.

=== To S.F.C. ===
Promoted from I.F.C.

- Moycullen – (Intermediate Champions)

=== From S.F.C. ===
Relegated to I.F.C.

- Kilkerrin-Clonberne

== Round 1 ==
All 20 teams enter the competition in this round. The 10 winners progress to Round 2A while the 10 losers progress to Round 2B.

14 May 2016
17:30
Round 1

Mountbellew-Moylough	0-17 – 1-12	Killanin

Kenny Park

14 May 2016
17:30
Round 1

St Michael's	0-15 – 1-9	Barna

Moycullen

14 May 2016
17:45
Round 1

Corofin	2-20 – 0-8	Cárna-Caiseal

Pearse Stadium

14 May 2016
17:45
Round 1

Tuam Stars	2-12 – 2-11	Cortoon Shamrocks

Tuam Stadium

14 May 2016
19:30
Round 1

Milltown	2-7 – 1-8	Salthill-Knocknacarra

Tuam Stadium

14 May 2016
19:30
Round 1

Carraroe	1-16 – 1-8	Naomh Anna Leitir Móir

Pearse Stadium

15 May 2016
13:45
Round 1

St James'	3-9 – 1-14	Caherlistrane

Corofin

15 May 2016
14:00
Round 1

Míchael Breathnach	5-10 – 1-10	Killererin

Pearse Stadium

15 May 2016
15:45
Round 1

Moycullen	1-16 – 0-8	Kilconly

Pearse Stadium

15 May 2016
18:30
Round 1

Caltra	2-13 – 0-10	Annaghdown

Tuam Stadium

== Round 2 ==
=== Round 2A ===
The 10 winners from Round 1 enter this round. The 5 winners will enter the draw for the Preliminary Quarter Finals while the 5 losers will play in Round 3.

28 May 2016
17:30
Round 2A

Tuam Stars	2-16 – 2-7	Carraroe

Pearse Stadium

28 May 2016
17:30
Round 2A

Mountbellew-Moylough	0-11 – 0-9	Caltra

Kenny Park

28 May 2016
19:30
Round 2A

Corofin	1-11 – 1-6	Milltown

Tuam Stadium

29 May 2016
14:00
Round 2A

Míchael Breathnach	3-11 – 0-12	St Michael's

Pearse Stadium

29 May 2016
15:45
Round 2A

Moycullen	0-16 – 0-13	St James'

Pearse Stadium

=== Round 2B ===
The 10 losers from Round 1 enter this round. The 5 winners will go into the Round 3 while the 5 losers will enter the Relegation Playoffs.

28 May 2016
17:30
Round 2B

Cárna-Caiseal	3-8 – 1-11	Killererin

Inverin

28 May 2016
17:45
Round 2B

Cortoon Shamrocks	2-15 – 1-5	Kilconly

Tuam Stadium

28 May 2016
19:15
Round 2B

Salthill-Knocknacarra	1-17 – 1-13	Naomh Anna Leitir Móir

Inverin

28 May 2015
19:15
Round 2B

Killanin	2-16 – 1-6	Barna

Pearse Stadium

29 May 2016
18:00
Round 2B

Caherlistrane	3-12 – 1-15	Annaghdown

Tuam Stadium

== Round 3 ==
The 5 losers from Round 2A enter this round and they play the 5 winners from Round 2B. The 5 winners will go into the draw for the Preliminary Quarter-Finals while the 5 losers will enter the Relegation Playoffs.

13 August 2016
17:00
Round 3

Caherlistrane	2-18 – 4-6	St James'

Pearse Stadium

13 August 2016
18:45
Round 3

Carraroe	2-12 – 1-8	Cárna-Caiseal

Pearse Stadium

28 August 2016
17:00
Round 3

Salthill-Knocknacarra	1-9 – 0-10	Caltra

Tuam Stadium

28 August 2016
18:45
Round 3

Cortoon Shamrocks	0-14 – 1-6	St Michael's

Tuam Stadium

28 August 2016
18:45
Round 3

Milltown	1-11 – 0-10	Killanin

Pearse Stadium

== Preliminary Quarter-Finals ==
The 5 Round 2A winners, the 5 Round 3 winners and N.U.I.G. enter the competition at this stage. A draw was conducted to choose 6 of these teams to play in this round. The 3 winners (along with the 5 teams who receive byes) will proceed to the quarter-finals.

27 August 2016
17:45
Preliminary Quarter-Final

Corofin	1-14 – 0-10	Carraroe

Pearse Stadium

28 August 2016
17:00
Preliminary Quarter-Final

Caherlistrane	0-17 – 0-14	Moycullen

Pearse Stadium

28 August 2016
18:00
Preliminary Quarter-Final

Míchael Breathnach	w/o – scr	N.U.I.G.

Spiddal

- Cortoon Shamrocks – Bye
- Milltown – Bye
- Mountbellew-Moylough – Bye
- Salthill-Knocknacarra – Bye
- Tuam Stars – Bye

== Quarter-finals ==
The 3 winners from the Preliminary Quarter-Finals (along with the 5 teams who received byes) enter the quarter-finals.

11 September 2016
15:15
Quarter-Final

Cortoon Shamrocks	2-11 – 1-5	Míchael Breathnach

Pearse Stadium
Referee: Gearóid O'Conamha

11 September 2016
15:30
Quarter-Final

Mountbellew-Moylough	0-9 – 0-9	Milltown

Tuam Stadium
Referee: James Molloy

11 September 2016
17:15
Quarter-Final

Corofin	2-10 – 0-9	Tuam Stars

Tuam Stadium
Referee: Tommy Faherty

25 September 2016
15:45
Quarter-Final

Salthill-Knocknacarra	2-7 – 1-5	Caherlistrane

Tuam Stadium
Referee: Noel Dempsey

25 September 2016
14:00
Quarter-Final Replay

Mountbellew-Moylough	3-12 – 0-10	Milltown

Tuam Stadium
Referee: Frank Kinneen

== Semi-finals ==
9 October 2016
2:30pm
Semi-Final

Salthill-Knocknacarra	1-11 – 0-8	Cortoon Shamrocks

Tuam Stadium
Referee: Shane Hehir

9 October 2016
4:15pm
Semi-Final

Corofin	3-13 – 1-11	Mountbellew-Moylough

Tuam Stadium
Referee: Gearoid O'Conamha

== Final ==
23 October 2016; 3:30 pm Final	Corofin	0-16 – 0-11	Salthill-Knocknacarra	Pearse Stadium; Attendance: 4,463; Referee: Tommy Faherty; Man of the Match: Jason Leonard
23 October 2016; 3:30 pm Final	Jason Leonard 0-9 (0-4f), Michael Lundy, Michael Farragher, Ian Burke 0-2 each, Kieran Molloy 0-1	Report	Sean Armstrong 0-6 (0-2f), Robert Finnerty 0-4 (0-3f), Tadhg Haran 0-1f	Pearse Stadium; Attendance: 4,463; Referee: Tommy Faherty; Man of the Match: Jason Leonard

== Last Eleven ==
Preliminary Quarter-Finals
Míchael Breathnach	w/o
N.U.I.G.	scr
Caherlistrane	0-17
Moycullen	0-14
Corofin	1-14
Carraroe	0-10

Quarter-Finals
Cortoon Shamrocks	2-11
Míchael Breathnach	1-5
Salthill-Knocknacarra	2-7
Caherlistrane	1-5
Corofin	2-10
Tuam Stars	0-9
Mountbellew-Moylough	0-9; 3-12
Milltown	0-9; 0-10

Semi-Finals
Cortoon Shamrocks	0-8
Salthill-Knocknacarra	1-11
Corofin	3-13
Mountbellew-Moylough	1-11

Final
Salthill-Knocknacarra	0-11
Corofin	0-16

== Relegation Playoffs ==
The 5 Round 2B losers and 5 Round 3 losers enter the Relegation Playoff.

=== Relegation preliminary round ===
A draw was conducted and 4 teams were chosen to play in the Relegation Preliminary Round. The 2 winners earn their place in the S.F.C. for 2017 while the losers enter the Relegation Quarter-Finals along with the 6 clubs who received byes.

27 August 2016
16:00
Relegation preliminary round

St James'	1-16 – 1-10	Cárna-Caiseal

Pearse Stadium

11 September 2016
13:30
Relegation preliminary round

Killanin	1-7 – 0-9	St Michael's

Pearse Stadium

=== Relegation Quarter-Finals ===
The 2 Relegation Preliminary Round losers enter the Relegation Quarter-Finals along with the 6 clubs who received byes. The 4 winners will earn their place in the 2017 S.F.C. while the 2 losers will enter the Relegation Semi-Finals.

10 September 2016
15:30
Relegation Quarter-Final

Caltra	4-10 – 1-12	Naomh Anna Leitir Móir

Pearse Stadium

24 September 2016
17:00
Relegation Quarter-Final

Kilconly	6-5 – 0-16	Annaghdown

Tuam Stadium

25 September 2016
3:30pm
Relegation Quarter-Final

St Michael's	4-14 – 3-5	Cárna-Caiseal

Pearse Stadium

25 September 2016
5:15pm
Relegation Quarter-Final

Barna	3-11 – 2-11	Killererin

Pearse Stadium

=== Relegation Semi-Finals ===
The 4 Relegation Quarter-Final losers play against each other in this round. The 2 winners will earn their place in the 2017 S.F.C. while the 2 losers will enter the Relegation Final.

8 October 2016
3:00pm
Relegation Semi-Final

Killererin	2-13 – 1-14	Cárna-Caiseal

Inverin

15 October 2016
3:45pm
Relegation Semi-Final

Annaghdown	0-15 – 0-12	Naomh Anna Leitir Móir

Spiddal

=== Relegation Final ===
The winner will earn their place in the 2017 S.F.C. while the loser will be relegated to the Intermediate grade.

12 November 2016
2:30pm
Relegation Final

Naomh Anna Leitir Móir	1-13 – 2-8	Cárna-Cáiseal

Pearse Stadium
