= 2025 Galway Senior Football Championship =

Gaelic football competition in Galway, Ireland for the 2025 Season

Galway S.F.C.
- Season: 2025
- Champions: Maigh Cuilinn; Moycullen (3rd title)
- Winning Captain: David Wynn
- Man of The Match: Sean Kelly

The 2025 Galway Senior Football Championship was the 130th edition of Galway GAA's premier Gaelic football tournament for senior graded clubs in County Galway, Ireland. The winners received the Frank Fox Cup and represented Galway in the Connacht Senior Club Football Championship.

Sixteen teams competed. The previous year's four semi-finalists were seeded and separated into four groups of four.

Corofin were the defending champions after they defeated Moycullen in the 2024 final.

This was St Michael's return the senior grade after an absence of 1 season (since their relegation from the S.F.C. in 2023) after they claimed to 2024 I.F.C. title.

== Team changes ==
The following teams changed division since the 2024 championship season.

=== To S.F.C. ===
Promoted from 2024 Galway Intermediate Football Championship

- St Michael's - (Intermediate Champions)

=== From S.F.C. ===
Relegated to 2025 Galway Intermediate Football Championship

- Caherlistrane

== Format ==
=== Group stage ===
2025 brought about the same format for the competition as 2024 where there was 4 groups of 4 teams. The 2024 semi-finalists, Corofin, Moycullen, Tuam Stars and Salthill/Knocknacarra was seeded and placed in each group, with one group having two seeded teams. The remaining group places made up from the remaining 12 teams in an open draw.

If teams were level on points, the first deciding factor was the head-to-head result between the sides; the second was the points difference; and the third was the scoring average.

== Group stages ==
=== Group 1 ===
| Pos | Team | Pld | W | D | L | PF | PA | PD | Pts |
|---|---|---|---|---|---|---|---|---|---|
| 1 | Salthill/Knocknacarra | 3 | 3 | 0 | 0 | 51 | 14 | +37 | 6 |
| 2 | Oughterard | 3 | 2 | 0 | 1 | 50 | 49 | +1 | 4 |
| 3 | Mountbellew/Moylough | 3 | 1 | 0 | 2 | 46 | 42 | +4 | 2 |
| 4 | St Michael's | 3 | 0 | 0 | 3 | 42 | 56 | −14 | 0 |

Updated to match(es) played on unknown. Source:

Round 1

2/08/2025
6 PM

| Salthill-Knocknacarra | 0-17 - 1-10 | Mountbellew/Moylough |

Tuam Stadium
Referee: Richard Mc Nicholas
3/08/2025
2:45 PM

| St Michael's | 2-10 - 0-22 | Oughterard |

Pearse Stadium
Referee: Anthony Coyne

Round 2

16/08/2025
4:15 PM

| St Michael's | 0-11 - 3-11 | Mountbellew/Moylough |

Tuam Stadium
Referee: P.J. Rabbite
17/08/2025
2:45 PM

| Oughterard | 1-11 - 1-17 | Salthill/Knocknacarra |

Pearse Stadium
Referee: Austin O'Connell

Round 3

30/08/2025
2:45 PM

| Mountbellew/Moylough | 1-10 - 1-11 | Oughterard |

Pearse Stadium
Referee: Gerard Anthony Lohan
31/08/2025
5 PM

| St Michael's | 0-10 - 0-14 | Salthill/Knocknacarra |

Pearse Stadium
Referee: Frank Kinneen

=== Group 2 ===
| Pos | Team | Pld | W | D | L | PF | PA | PD | Pts |
|---|---|---|---|---|---|---|---|---|---|
| 1 | Moycullen | 3 | 2 | 1 | 0 | 63 | 40 | +23 | 5 |
| 2 | Killannin | 3 | 2 | 0 | 1 | 55 | 57 | −2 | 4 |
| 3 | St. James | 3 | 1 | 1 | 1 | 50 | 44 | +6 | 3 |
| 4 | Bearna | 3 | 0 | 0 | 3 | 35 | 62 | −27 | 0 |

Updated to match(es) played on unknown. Source:

Round 1

2/08/2025
4:30 PM

| St. James | 0-17 - 0-18 | Killannin |

Pearse Stadium
Referee: Austin O'Connell
3/08/2025
4:30 PM

| Moycullen | 1-21 - 0-08 | Bearna |

Pearse Stadium
Referee: Colm Conway

Round 2

16/08/2025
6:15 PM

| St. James | 2-14 - 0-13 | Bearna |

Pearse Stadium
Referee: Noel Dempsey
17/08/2025
4:30 PM

| Moycullen | 3-17 - 1-16 | Bearna |

Pearse Stadium
Referee: Richard Mc Nicholas

Round 3

30/08/2025
6:30 PM

| Bearna | 0-14 - 1-15 | Killannin |

Pearse Stadium
Referee: Anthony Coyne
30/08/2025
4:30 PM

| St. James | 0-13 - 0-13 | Moycullen |

Kenny Park
Referee: James Molloy

=== Group 3 ===
| Pos | Team | Pld | W | D | L | PF | PA | PD | Pts |
|---|---|---|---|---|---|---|---|---|---|
| 1 | Tuam Stars | 3 | 3 | 0 | 0 | 54 | 35 | +19 | 6 |
| 2 | Dunmore MacHales | 3 | 2 | 0 | 1 | 65 | 50 | +15 | 4 |
| 3 | Claregalway | 3 | 1 | 0 | 2 | 50 | 50 | 0 | 2 |
| 4 | Annaghdown | 3 | 0 | 0 | 3 | 34 | 68 | −34 | 0 |

Updated to match(es) played on unknown. Source:

Round 1

1/08/2025
7:30 PM

| Dunmore MacHales | 3-19 - 0-16 | Annaghdown |

Tuam Stadium
Referee: Mairtin Flaherty
3/08/2025
5 PM

| Tuam Stars | 1-13 - 1-11 | Claregalway |

Kenny Park
Referee: James Molloy

Round 2

17/08/2025
5:15 PM

| Annaghdown | 2-06 - 2-15 | Claregalway |

Tuam Stadium
Referee: Shane Curley
17/08/2025
5 PM

| Tuam Stars | 1-16 - 1-12 | Dunmore MacHales |

Tuam Stadium
Referee: Christopher Ryan

Round 3

31/08/2025
2:45 PM

| Tuam Stars | 3-10 - 0-06 | Annaghdown |

Kenny Park
Referee: Patrick Holohan
31/08/2025
5 PM

| Claregalway | 1-12 - 2-16 | Dunmore MacHales |

Tuam Stadium
Referee: Austin O'Connell

=== Group 4 ===
| Pos | Team | Pld | W | D | L | PF | PA | PD | Pts |
|---|---|---|---|---|---|---|---|---|---|
| 1 | Corofin | 3 | 2 | 1 | 0 | 63 | 33 | +30 | 5 |
| 2 | Milltown | 3 | 1 | 2 | 0 | 57 | 55 | +2 | 4 |
| 3 | Naomh Anna, Leitir Mor | 3 | 1 | 0 | 2 | 41 | 48 | −7 | 2 |
| 4 | Monivea/Abbey | 3 | 0 | 1 | 2 | 44 | 69 | −25 | 1 |

Updated to match(es) played on unknown. Source:

Round 1

2/08/2025
4:15 PM

| Corofin | 4-20 - 0-10 | Monivea-Abbey |

Tuam Stadium
Referee: Paddy Ó Gríofa
2/08/2025
6:15 PM

| Leitir Móir | 3-09 - 1-17 | Milltown |

Pearse Stadium
Referee: Christopher Ryan

Round 2

16/08/2025
4:30 PM

| Monivea-Abbey | 1-12 - 1-15 | Leitir Móir |

Pearse Stadium
Referee: Mairtin Flaherty
16/08/2025
6 PM

| Corofin | 1-15 - 1-15 | Milltown |

Tuam Stadium
Referee: James Molloy

Round 3

31/08/2025
3:15 PM

| Corofin | 0-13 - 0-05 | Leitir Móir |

Pearse Stadium
Referee: Christopher Ryan
31/08/2025
3:15 PM

| Milltown | 2-13 - 1-16 | Monivea-Abbey |

Tuam Stadium
Referee: Shane Curley

== Relegation play-offs ==
=== Relegation semi-finals ===
The 4th placed teams from Groups 1, 2, 3 and 4 face-off in the relegation semi-finals. The two winners from these semi-finals secured their senior status for 2026, while the two losers will proceed to the relegation final.

| 14 September 2025 Relegation Semi-Final | Monivea-Abbey | 1–14 (17) - Pen 4 – (17) 1-14 - Pen 2 | Bearna | Galway |
| 12 PM IST (UTC+1) | | | | Venue: Headford |
| | | | | Referee: Gerard Anthony Lohan |

| 13 September 2025 Relegation semi-final | Annaghdown | 2-17 (23) – (21) 2-15 | St Michael's | Galway |
| 5 PM IST (UTC+1) | | | | Venue: Tuam Stadium |
| | | | | Referee: Mairtin Flaherty |

=== Relegation final ===
The loser of the Relegation final was relegated to the 2026 Galway I.F.C. The winner maintained their Senior status into 2026.

| 27 September 2025 Relegation final | St Michael's | 1-07 (10) – (18) 2-11 | Bearna | Noel Dempsey |
| 5 PM IST (UTC+1) | | | | Venue: Tuam Stadium |

== Knockout Stage ==
=== Preliminary Quarter-finals ===
The 2nd and 3rd placed teams in Groups 1, 2, 3 and 4 qualify for the preliminary quarter-finals. The winners played the group winners in the quarter-finals

| 14 September 2025 Preliminary Quarter-final | Dunmore MacHales | 1-18 (21) – (20) 4-08 | Naomh Anna, Leitir Mór | Galway |
| 3 PM IWT (UTC±0) | | | | Stadium: Pearse Stadium; Referee: Noel Dempsey |

| 14 September 2025 Preliminary Quarter-final | Killannin | 3-10 (19) – (18) 1-15 | Mountbellew/Moylough | Galway |
| 4:45 PM IWT (UTC±0) | | | | Stadium: Pearse Stadium; Referee: James Molloy |

| 14 September 2025 Preliminary Quarter-final | Milltown | 1-11 (14) – (20) 1-17 | St James' | Galway |
| 4:30 PM IWT (UTC±0) | | | | Stadium: Tuam Stadium; Referee: Christopher Ryan |

| 13 September 2025 Preliminary Quarter-final | Oughterard | 1-16 (19) – (17) 2-11 | Claregalway | Galway |
| 5 PM IWT (UTC±0) | | | | Stadium: Pearse Stadium; Referee: Richard McNicholas |

=== Quarter-finals ===
| 27 September 2025 Quarter-final | Moycullen | 2-19 (25) – 2-12 (18) | Oughterard | Galway |
| 5 PM GMT (UTC±0) | | | | Stadium: Pearse Stadium; Referee: Mairtin O'Flaherty |

| 28 September 2025 Quarter-final | Corofin | 2-20 (26) – 0-10 (10) | Dunmore MacHales | Galway |
| 3 PM IWT (UTC±0) | | | | Stadium: Tuam Stadium; Referee: Christopher Ryan |

| 28 September 2025 Quarter-final | Tuam Stars | 1-21 (24) – 0-17 (17) AET | Killannin | Galway |
| 4:15 PM IWT (UTC±0) | | | | Stadium: Kenny Park; Referee: Shane Curley |

| 28 September 2025 Preliminary Quarter-final | Salthill/Knocknacarra | 5-15 (30) – 0-17 (17) | St James' | Galway |
| 4:30 PM IWT (UTC±0) | | | | Stadium: Pearse Stadium; Referee: Austin O'Connell |

=== Semi-finals ===
Holders Corofin blasted out of this year's Championship by Salthill/Knocknacarra

| 11 October 2025 Semi-final | Corofin | 1-15 (18) – 1-17 (20) | Salthill/Knocknacarra | Galway |
| 7.30 PMIWT (UTC±0) | J. McCabe 0-07 (1tpf, 1f), D. Silke 1-02 (1f, 145), D. Canney 0-02 (1f), K. Molloy, R. Coen, P. Egan (0-01 each) | | R. Finnerty 1-06 (2 tpf, 1f), D. O'Flaherty 0-03 (1tp), M. Thompson, M. Mannion (tp), C. Power (0-02 each), R. Walzer, E. Nolan (0-01 each) | Stadium: Pearse Stadium; Referee: Shane Curley |

| 11 October 2025 Semi-final | Moycullen | 0-18 (18) – 1-14 (17) | Tuam Stars | Galway |
| 5.45 PM IWT (UTC±0) | | Report | | Stadium: Pearse Stadium; Referee: Austin O'Connell |

=== Final ===
| 25 October 2025 Final | Moycullen | 1-17 (20) – 1-15 (18) | Salthill/Knocknacarra | Galway |
| 7.30PM IWT (UTC±0) | Dessie Conneely (2tpf, 1f) 0-6, Sean Kelly 1-2, Peter Cooke (2tp) 0-4, Fionn McDonagh 0-2, Niall Walsh, Johnny Moloney 0-1 each. | | Robert Finnerty (pen, tpf, 3f) 1-7, Matthew Thompson (2p) 0-5, Dónal O'Sullivan ('45'), Cathal Sweeney, Robert Walzer 0-1 each. | Stadium: Pearse Stadium; Referee: Christopher Ryan (Killannin |

=== Top scorers ===
Overall

| Rank | Player | Club | Tally | Total |
|---|---|---|---|---|
| 1 | Dessie Conneely | Maigh Cuilinn | 2–37 | 43 |
| 2 | Padraig Costello | Dunmore MacHales GAC | 1–28 | 31 |
| 3 | Robert Finnerty | Salthill-Knocknacarra | 4-18 | 30 |
| 4 | Dara Walsh | Killannin GAA | 0–27 | 27 |
| 5 | Barry McHugh | Mountbellew-Moylough GAA | 1–21 | 24 |
| 6 | Michael Martin | Milltown | 2–18 | 24 |
| 7 | Jack Mullen | Claregalway GAA | 3–15 | 24 |
| 8 | Niall Lee | Oughterard GAA | 1–20 | 23 |
| 9 | Jack Nolan | St James’ GAA | 0–22 | 22 |
| 10 | Darragh Silke | Corofin | 3–13 | 22 |
