= Seán Óg De Paor =

Galway Gaelic footballer

Seán Óg de Paor
Personal information
- Native name: Seán Óg de Paor (Irish)
- Born: 24 December 1970 (age 55) Dublin, Ireland
- Occupation: Secondary school teacher

Sport
- Sport: Gaelic football
- Position: Left half back
Club
- Years: Club
- 1987–2007: An Cheathrú Rua
Club titles
- Galway titles: 1
College
- Years: College
- UCG
College titles
- Sigerson titles: 1
Inter-county
- Years: County
- 1991–2005: Galway
Inter-county titles
- Connacht titles: 6
- All-Irelands: 2
- NFL: 0
- All Stars: 2

Seán Óg de Paor (born 24 December 1970) is an Irish former Gaelic footballer who played at senior level for the Galway county team.

De Paor comes from An Cheathrú Rua in the Connemara Gaeltacht, where he attended the local national school, Scoil Mhic Dara. It was there he started playing Gaelic football, and he captained the team that won Corn Uí Chonaire - a competition between Gaeltacht national schools in Galway - two years running, in 1982 and 1983.

From there he went on to secondary school in St Jarlath's College in Tuam, where he further developed his Gaelic-footballing skills. He then went on to attend University College Galway, captaining its 1992 Sigerson Cup-winning side. Throughout this period, he was also regularly playing football for his club, An Cheathrú Rua, and he was on the team that was promoted to senior status in 1987, and he played a vital role when the club won the Senior County Championship in 1996 and Comórtas Peile na Gaeltachta in 1997.

But it was as an intercounty player that Seán Óg is best known; he played minor, under 21 and senior-level football for Galway, under a variety of different managers, without great success, it must be admitted, until the arrival of John O'Mahony as manager in 1997. Seán Óg played a key role in Galway’s winning the All-Ireland in 1998 and 2001, and he appeared in another All-Ireland final against Kerry in 2000, although they were beaten that time around. Seán Óg also played for his country against Australia in the International Rules series in four successive years, between 1998 and 2001.

In 2004, De Paor suffered a cruciate ligament injury and missed all of the 2004 Championship as a result. He struggled to shake off the injury the following, restricting his involvement in the 2005 Championship. In December of that year, he decided to retire from inter-county football

In January 2008, De Paor released his autobiography, Lá An Phaoraigh, written entirely in Irish with the assistance of his sister Aoife de Paor, and published by Cló Iar-Chonnachta.
