= Galway Senior Football Championship =

Annual Gaelic football competition

- Current season or competition: 2026 Galway Senior Football Championship
- Founded: 1889
- Title holders: Salthill-Knocknacarra (4th title)
- Most titles: Tuam Stars (25 titles)
- Sponsors: Bon Secours Galway

The Galway Senior Football Championship is an annual Gaelic Athletic Association competition between the top Gaelic football clubs in Galway. The winners of the Galway Championship qualify to represent their county in the Connacht Senior Club Football Championship, the winners of which go on to the All-Ireland Senior Club Football Championship. The winning team is presented with the Frank Fox Cup.

Tuam Stars are the most successful with 25 wins. St. Grellan's, Ballinasloe hold the record for most consecutive championships, winning 8 from 1922 to 1929.

2018 saw the competition take on a new format, with group stages consisting of 4 groups of 5 teams.

== Teams ==
Caltra were promoted to the championship having won the 2026 Intermediate Championship.

| Team | Location | Position in 2026 | In championship since | Championship Titles | Last Championship Title |
|---|---|---|---|---|---|
| Annaghdown | Annaghdown | Semi-Finals | 1991 | 5 | 2001 |
| Bearna | Barna | Preliminary Quarter-Finals | 1999 | 0 | N/A |
| Caltra | Caltra | Relegation Final | 2026 | 1 | 2003 |
| Claregalway | Claregalway | Quarter-Finals | 2016 | 0 | N/A |
| Corofin | Corofin | Semi-Finals | 1932 | 23 | 2024 |
| Dunmore MacHales | Dunmore | Preliminary Quarter-Finals | 2022 | 15 | 1983 |
| Killannin | Killanin | Relegation Semi-Finals | 1991 | 0 | N/A |
| Milltown | Milltown | Preliminary Quarter-Finals | 1961 | 2 | 1981 |
| Monivea/Abbey | Monivea | Quarter-Finals | 2025 | 1 | 1992 |
| Mountbellew/Moylough | Mountbellew | Quarter-Finals | 1975 | 5 | 2021 |
| Moycullen | Moycullen | Runners-Up | 2007 | 3 | 2025 |
| Naomh Anna, Leitir Móir | Leitir Móir | Relegated | 2022 | 0 | N/A |
| Oughterard | Oughterard | Quarter-Finals | 2020 | 1 | 1938 |
| Salthill/Knocknacarra | Salthill | Champions | 1990 | 4 | 2026 |
| St James' | Mervue | Relegation Semi-Finals | 2010 | 0 | N/A |
| Tuam Stars | Tuam | Preliminary Quarter-Finals | 1887 | 25 | 1994 |

== Top winners ==
| # | Club | Wins | Years won | Runner-up | Years runner-up |
|---|---|---|---|---|---|
| 1 | Tuam Stars | 25 | 1892, 1893, 1894, 1895, 1896, 1905, 1908, 1909, 1911, 1942, 1943, 1947, 1952, 1954, 1955, 1956, 1957, 1958, 1959, 1960, 1962, 1984, 1988, 1989, 1994 | 14 | 1897, 1904, 1915, 1916, 1917, 1918, 1922, 1928, 1932, 1969, 1972, 1992, 2011, 2012, 2019 |
| 2 | Corofin | 23 | 1932, 1946, 1977, 1991, 1993, 1995, 1997, 1998, 2000, 2002, 2006, 2008, 2009, 2011, 2013, 2014, 2015, 2016, 2017, 2018, 2019, 2023, 2024 | 11 | 1889, 1936, 1964, 1970, 1974, 1980, 1988, 1990, 1994, 2010, 2021 |
| 3 | St Grellan's, Ballinasloe | 20 | 1913, 1914, 1915, 1916, 1917, 1918, 1919, 1922, 1923, 1924, 1925, 1926, 1927, 1928, 1929, 1939, 1944, 1945, 1979, 1980 | 15 | 1907, 1908, 1910, 1930, 1931, 1938, 1941, 1946, 1948, 1950, 1951, 1955, 1956, 1971, 1981 |
| 4 | Dunmore MacHales | 15 | 1889, 1891, 1900, 1902, 1907, 1910, 1912, 1953, 1961, 1963, 1966, 1968, 1969, 1973, 1983 | 14 | 1898, 1901, 1906, 1909, 1911, 1933, 1940, 1954, 1960, 1962, 1965, 1979, 1984, 1997 |
| 5 | Father Griffins | 7 | 1948, 1949, 1950, 1967, 1970, 1972, 1975 | 2 | 1966, 1968 |
| 6 | Killererin | 6 | 1976, 1978, 1999, 2004, 2007, 2010 | 2 | 2001, 2003 |
| 7 | Annaghdown | 5 | 1931, 1982, 1985, 1987, 2001 | 4 | 1934, 1959, 1989, 2002 |
| 7 | Mountbellew-Moylough | 5 | 1964, 1965, 1974, 1986, 2021 | 12 | 1890, 1891, 1914, 1919, 1963, 1976, 1982, 2009, 2015, 2017, 2018, 2020 |
| 9 | Salthill-Knocknacarra | 4 | 1990, 2005, 2012, 2026 | 6 | 1991, 1993, 2004, 2013, 2016, 2022, 2025 |
| 10 | Athenry De Wets | 3 | 1903, 1904, 1906 | 1 | 1905 |
| 10 | UCG | 3 | 1933, 1934, 1937 | 3 | 1943, 1949, 1973 |
| 10 | Moycullen | 3 | 2020, 2022, 2025 | 3 | 1977, 2023, 2024, 2026 |
| 12 | Loughrea | 2 | 1897, 1898 | 2 | 1894, 1896 |
| 12 | Wolfe Tone's | 2 | 1936, 1941 | 1 | 1937 |
| 12 | Army (Renmore) | 2 | 1940, 1951 | 2 | 1939, 1947 |
| 12 | Milltown | 2 | 1971, 1981 | 5 | 1967, 1978, 1986, 1987, 2007 |
| 17 | Caherlistrane | 1 | 1890 | 1 | 1892 |
| 17 | Tuam Krugers | 1 | 1901 | 1 | 1902 |
| 17 | Galway Gaels | 1 | 1930 | 2 | 1925, 1929 |
| 17 | Oughterard | 1 | 1938 | 3 | 1945, 1952, 1953 |
| 17 | Monivea-Abbey | 1 | 1992 | 1 | 1985 |
| 17 | An Cheathrú Rua | 1 | 1996 | 2 | 1998, 1999 |
| 17 | Caltra | 1 | 2003 | 2 | 1975, 2006 |
| 24 | Ballygar | 0 | | 3 | 1957, 1958, 1961 |
| 24 | Erins Hope | 0 | | 2 | 1942, 1944 |
| 24 | Belclare Harps | 0 | | 1 | 1900 |
| 24 | Galway Sarsfields | 0 | | 1 | 1903 |
| 24 | Castlefrench | 0 | | 1 | 1912 |
| 24 | Clifden | 0 | | 1 | 1913 |
| 24 | Clonbur | 0 | | 1 | 1983 |
| 24 | Oranmore-Maree | | | 1 | 1996 |
| 24 | Killannin | 0 | | 1 | 2000 |
| 24 | Carna-Cashel | 0 | | 1 | 2005 |
| 24 | Cortoon Shamrocks | 0 | | 1 | 2008 |
| 24 | St Michael's | 0 | | 1 | 2014 |

== Roll of honour ==
| Year | Winner | Score | Opponent | Score |
|---|---|---|---|---|
| 2026 | Salthill-Knocknacarra | 2-12 | Moycullen | 1-14 |
| 2025 | Moycullen | 1-17 | Salthill-Knocknacarra | 1-15 |
| 2024 | Corofin | 2-09 | Moycullen | 0-09 |
| 2023 | Corofin | 1-11 | Moycullen | 1-09 |
| 2022 | Moycullen | 1-10 | Salthill-Knocknacarra | 1-09 |
| 2021 | Mountbellew-Moylough | 1-12 | Corofin | 0-09 |
| 2020 | Moycullen | 2-12 | Mountbellew-Moylough | 1-11 |
| 2019 | Corofin | 0-15, 0-11 (R) | Tuam Stars | 2-09, 0-08 (R) |
| 2018 | Corofin | 0-07, 1-08 (R) | Mountbellew-Moylough | 0-07, 0-05 (R) |
| 2017 | Corofin | 2-14 | Mountbellew-Moylough | 0-10 |
| 2016 | Corofin | 0-16 | Salthill-Knocknacarra | 0-11 |
| 2015 | Corofin | 3-13 | Mountbellew-Moylough | 0-12 |
| 2014 | Corofin | 5-12 | St Michael's | 0-09 |
| 2013 | Corofin | 2-13 | Salthill-Knocknacarra | 0-07 |
| 2012 | Salthill-Knocknacarra | 0-12 | Tuam Stars | 0-07 |
| 2011 | Corofin | 0-16 | Tuam Stars | 1-06 |
| 2010 | Killererin | 1-10 | Corofin | 1-07 |
| 2009 | Corofin | 0-09, 0-11 (R) | Mountbellew/Moylough | 0-09, 1-05 (R) |
| 2008 | Corofin | 0-08 | Cortoon Shamrocks | 0-05 |
| 2007 | Killererin | 1-09 | Milltown | 0-10 |
| 2006 | Corofin | 1-10 | Caltra | 0-09 |
| 2005 | Salthill-Knocknacarra | 0-11 | Carna-Cashel | 2-02 |
| 2004 | Killererin | 1-10 | Salthill-Knocknacarra | 0-10 |
| 2003 | Caltra | 3-11 | Killererin | 0-05 |
| 2002 | Corofin | 3-11 | Annaghdown | 2-02 |
| 2001 | Annaghdown | 1-07 | Killererin | 0-08 |
| 2000 | Corofin | 1-03 | Killanin | 0-03 |
| 1999 | Killererin | 1-06, 1-12 (R) | An Cheathrú Rua | 0-09, 1-08 (R) |
| 1998 | Corofin | 1-09 | An Cheathrú Rua | 0-08 |
| 1997 | Corofin | 0-09 | Dunmore MacHales | 0-06 |
| 1996 | An Cheathrú Rua | 1-11 | Oranmore-Maree | 0-10 |
| 1995 | Corofin | 2-08 | Tuam Stars | 0-11 |
| 1994 | Tuam Stars | 0-07 | Corofin | 0-06 |
| 1993 | Corofin | 2-10 | Salthill-Knocknacarra | 0-13 |
| 1992 | Monivea-Abbey | 2-11 | Tuam Stars | 0-11 |
| 1991 | Corofin | 2-06, 0-14 (R) | Salthill-Knocknacarra | 0-12, 0-06 (R) |
| 1990 | Salthill-Knocknacarra | 4-12 | Corofin | 2-03 |
| 1989 | Tuam Stars | 2-09 | Annaghdown | 0-05 |
| 1988 | Tuam Stars | 1-08 | Corofin | 0-05 |
| 1987 | Annaghdown | 1-07 | Milltown | 0-07 |
| 1986 | Mountbellew/Moylough | 0-05, 1-05 (R) | Milltown | 0-05, 0-04 (R) |
| 1985 | Annaghdown | 0-06, 1-08 (R) | Monivea-Abbey | 0-06, 1-06 (R) |
| 1984 | Tuam Stars | 1-09 | Dunmore MacHales | 0-07 |
| 1983 | Dunmore MacHales | 1-08 | Clonbur | 1-06 |
| 1982 | Annaghdown | 1-09 | Mountbellew/Moylough | 0-07 |
| 1981 | Milltown | 0-11 | St Grellan's, Ballinasloe | 2-03 |
| 1980 | St Grellan's, Ballinasloe | 0-09 | Corofin | 0-08 |
| 1979 | St Grellan's, Ballinasloe | 0-09 | Dunmore MacHales | 0-08 |
| 1978 | Killererin | 1-04, 2-06 (R) | Milltown | 1-04, 0-11 (R) |
| 1977 | Corofin | 1-09 | Moycullen | 0-03 |
| 1976 | Killererin | 2-05 | Mountbellew | 1-04 |
| 1975 | Fr. Griffins | 0-09 | Caltra | 0-05 |
| 1974 | Mountbellew | 1-05 | Corofin | 0-07 |
| 1973 | Dunmore MacHales | 2-11 | UCG | 0-12 |
| 1972 | Fr. Griffins | 4-10 | Tuam Stars | 2-07 |
| 1971 | Milltown | 0-05 | St Grellan's, Ballinasloe | 0-04 |
| 1970 | Fr. Griffins | 2-07 | Corofin | 1-08 |
| 1969 | Dunmore MacHales | 1-08 | Tuam Stars | 1-06 |
| 1968 | Dunmore MacHales | 2-10 | Fr. Griffins | 1-08 |
| 1967 | Fr. Griffins | 1-06 | Milltown | 0-06 |
| 1966 | Dunmore MacHales | 2-12 | Fr. Griffins | 3-05 |
| 1965 | Mountbellew | 1-09 | Dunmore MacHales | 1-06 |
| 1964 | Mountbellew | 2-10 | Corofin | 1-04 |
| 1963 | Dunmore MacHales | 2-19 | Mountbellew | 2-04 |
| 1962 | Tuam Stars | 1-05 | Dunmore MacHales | 0-06 |
| 1961 | Dunmore MacHales | 1-03 | Ballygar | 0-05 |
| 1960 | Tuam Stars | 1-10 | Dunmore MacHales | 0-06 |
| 1959 | Tuam Stars | Walk-over | Annaghdown | |
| 1958 | Tuam Stars | 2-15 | Ballygar | 1-04 |
| 1957 | Tuam Stars | 4-07 | Ballygar | 2-06 |
| 1956 | Tuam Stars | 3-08 | St Grellan's, Ballinasloe | 3-01 |
| 1955 | Tuam Stars | 3-08 | St Grellan's, Ballinasloe | 1-07 |
| 1954 | Tuam Stars | 1-09 | Dunmore MacHales | 0-09 |
| 1953 | Dunmore MacHales | 2-05 | Oughterard | 0-04 |
| 1952 | Tuam Stars | 1-07 | Oughterard | 1-04 |
| 1951 | An Chéad Cath | 1-04 | St Grellan's, Ballinasloe | 1-03 |
| 1950 | Fr. Griffins | 4-08 | St Grellan's, Ballinasloe | 2-03 |
| 1949 | Fr. Griffins | Walk-over | UCG | |
| 1948 | Fr. Griffins | 2-04 | St Grellan's, Ballinasloe | 0-06 |
| 1947 | Tuam Stars | 1-07 | An Chéad Cath | 2-02 |
| 1946 | Corofin | 1-03 | St Grellan's, Ballinasloe | 0-02 |
| 1945 | St Grellan's, Ballinasloe | 1-08 | Oughterard | 0-03 |
| 1944 | St Grellan's, Ballinasloe | 1-09 | Erin's Hope | 1-03 |
| 1943 | Tuam Stars | Awarded | UCG | |
| 1942 | Tuam Stars | 1-07 | Erin's Hope | 0-04 |
| 1941 | Wolfe Tones | 2-08 | St Grellan's, Ballinasloe | 0-02 |
| 1940 | An Chéad Cath | 4-06 | Dunmore MacHales | 2-03 |
| 1939 | St Grellan's, Ballinasloe | 4-05 | An Chéad Cath | 1-01 |
| 1938 | Oughterard | 2-05 | St Grellan's, Ballinasloe | 1-03 |
| 1937 | UCG | 6-07 | Wolfe Tones | 1-04 |
| 1936 | Wolfe Tones | 0-09 | Corofin | 1-00 |
| 1935 | No Championship | | | |
| 1934 | UCG | 5-09 | Annaghdown | 1-06 |
| 1933 | UCG | 3-04 | Dunmore MacHales | 2-05 |
| 1932 | Corofin | 3-05 | Tuam Stars | 1-03 |
| 1931 | Annaghdown | 4-02 | St Grellan's, Ballinasloe | 0-13 |
| 1930 | Galway Gaels | 1-04 | St Grellan's, Ballinasloe | 1-03 |
| 1929 | St Grellan's, Ballinasloe | 3-09 | Galway Gaels | 1-04 |
| 1928 | St Grellan's, Ballinasloe | 2-08 | Tuam Stars | 3-04 |
| 1927 | Championship Abandoned | | | |
| 1926 | Championship Abandoned | | | |
| 1925 | St Grellan's, Ballinasloe | | Galway Gaels | |
| 1924 | Championship Abandoned - Ballinasloe and Dunmore in the final | | | |
| 1923 | St Grellan's, Ballinasloe | | | |
| 1922 | St Grellan's, Ballinasloe | 5-03 | Tuam Stars | 1-01 |
| 1921 | No Championship | | | |
| 1920 | No Championship | | | |
| 1919 | St Grellan's, Ballinasloe | 2-07 | Mountbellew | 1-04 |
| 1918 | St Grellan's, Ballinasloe | 1-05 | Tuam Stars | 0-00 |
| 1917 | St Grellan's, Ballinasloe | 3-03 | Tuam Stars | 0-03 |
| 1916 | St Grellan's, Ballinasloe | 2-06 | Tuam Stars | 0-02 |
| 1915 | St Grellan's, Ballinasloe | 3-08 | Tuam Stars | 0-00 |
| 1914 | St Grellan's, Ballinasloe | 3-03 | Mountbellew | 0-00 |
| 1913 | St Grellan's, Ballinasloe | 3-06 | Clifden | 1-01 |
| 1912 | Dunmore MacHales | 3-00 | Castlefrench | 0-00 |
| 1911 | Tuam Stars | 2-00, 3-00 (R) | Dunmore MacHales | 0-01, 0-02 (R) |
| 1910 | Dunmore MacHales | Awarded | St Grellan's, Ballinasloe | |
| 1909 | Tuam Stars | 0-06 | Dunmore MacHales | 0-05 |
| 1908 | Tuam Stars | Awarded | St Grellan's, Ballinasloe | |
| 1907 | Dunmore MacHales | 0-01 | St Grellan's, Ballinasloe | 0-00 |
| 1906 | Athenry DeWets | By 2 points | Dunmore MacHales | |
| 1905 | Tuam Jarlaths | 1-07 | Athenry DeWets | 0-03 |
| 1904 | Athenry DeWets | 2-05 | Tuam Stars | 1-03 |
| 1903 | Athenry DeWets | 0-06 | Galway Sarsfields | 0-02 |
| 1902 | Dunmore MacHales | 0-06 | Tuam Krugers | 0-04 |
| 1901 | Tuam Krugers | 0-05 | Dunmore MacHales | 0-03 |
| 1900 | Dunmore MacHales | 0-02 | Belcare Harpers | 0-00 |
| 1899 | No Championship | | | |
| 1898 | Loughrea | 0-04 | Dunmore MacHales | 0-02 |
| 1897 | Loughrea | Awarded | Tuam Stars | |
| 1896 | Tuam Stars | 1-00 | Loughrea | 0-00 |
| 1895 | Tuam Stars | Walk-over | Dunmore MacHales | |
| 1894 | Tuam Stars | 0-05 | Loughrea | 0-00 |
| 1893 | Tuam Stars | Awarded | | |
| 1892 | Tuam Stars | 0-03 | Caherlistrane | 0-01 |
| 1891 | Dunmore MacHales | 0-02 | Mountbellew | 0-01 |
| 1890 | Caherlistrane | 1-01 | Mountbellew | 0-00 |
| 1889 | Dunmore MacHales | Awarded | Portumna | |
