= 2018 Galway Senior Football Championship =

Galway S.F.C.
- Season: 2018
- Champions: Corofin (20th S.F.C. Title)
- Relegated: Caltra; Cortoon Shamrocks; Kilconly
- Connacht SCFC: ???

The 2018 Galway Senior Football Championship is the 123rd edition of Galway GAA's premier Gaelic football tournament for senior graded clubs in County Galway, Ireland. The winners receive the Frank Fox Cup and represent Galway in the Connacht Senior Club Football Championship.

Twenty teams compete. This year there will be a new format. With the previous years 4 semi finalists being seeded and separated into 4 groups of 5

Corofin were the defending champions after they defeated Mountbellew/Moylough in the 2017 final.

This was Claregalways's return the senior grade after a 4 year exodus (they were relegated from the S.F.C. in 2013) when claiming the 2017 I.F.C. title.

Corofin retained their title with a win in a final replay over Mountbellew/Moylough. This was Corofin's sixth title in a row.

Caltra, Cortoon Shamrocks and Kilconly were relegated to the 2020 I.F.C. after 22, 15 and 7 years in the top-flight.

== Team changes ==
The following teams have changed division since the 2017 championship season.

=== To S.F.C. ===
Promoted from 2017 Galway Intermediate Football Championship

- Claregalway - (Intermediate Champions)

=== From S.F.C. ===
Relegated to 2018 Galway Intermediate Football Championship

- Micheál Breathnachs

== Format ==
=== Group stage ===
2018 brings about a new format for the competition where there is 4 groups of 5 teams. The 2017 Semi-finalists, Corofin, Mountbellew/Moylough, Annaghdown and Monivea/Abbey will be Seeded and placed in each Group. The remaining group places made up from the remaining 16 teams in an open draw. The top two teams in each group will qualify for the Knockout stage Quarter-finals. The third placed team in each group retains Senior Status for 2019. The Bottom two teams in the group enter the Relegation Playoff.

If teams are level on points, the first deciding factor will be the head-to-head result between the sides; the second will be the points difference; and the third will be the scoring average.

=== Knockout stage ===
Quarter-finals will be an open draw where top placed group teams will play 2nd Placed group teams. However teams cannot be paired with the other team who qualified from their group. Extra Time will be played in these games if required.

Semi-finals will be an open draw Replays to be played in the semi-finals & final if required. No Extra Time will be played in these games.

=== Relegation playoff ===
The four fourth placed teams are placed in an open draw, where the two winners will retain senior status for 2019. The two losers will join the four bottom placed teams in the groups for the final series of play-off relegation games.

Two Groups of Three
Rd 1: 1 v 2
Rd 2: Loser of 1 v 2 plays 3
Rd 3: Winner of 1 v 2 plays 3

The top teams in the groups retains their Senior Status for the following year. The two bottom teams in the groups are relegated to Intermediate for the following year. The two second placed teams in the Relegation groups play-off with the loser being the third team to be relegated to Intermediate for 2019 and the winner retaining Senior status.

== Group stages ==
=== Group 1 ===
| Pos | Team | Pld | W | D | L | PF | PA | PD | Pts |
|---|---|---|---|---|---|---|---|---|---|
| 1 | Corofin | 4 | 4 | 0 | 0 | 97 | 38 | +59 | 8 |
| 2 | St James' | 4 | 3 | 0 | 1 | 75 | 62 | +13 | 6 |
| 3 | Claregalway | 4 | 2 | 0 | 2 | 66 | 81 | −15 | 4 |
| 4 | An Cheathru Rua | 4 | 1 | 0 | 3 | 61 | 86 | −25 | 2 |
| 5 | Cortoon Shamrocks | 4 | 0 | 0 | 4 | 43 | 75 | −32 | 0 |

Updated to match(es) played on unknown. Source:

Round 1

20/05/2018
5:30 pm

| Claregalway | 0-10 - 1-17 | Corofin |

Tuam Stadium
Referee: Tommy Faherty
20/05/2018
3:00 pm

| Cortoon Shamrocks | 1-7 - 2-6 | An Ceathru Rua |

Clonbur
Referee: Richard Mc Nicholas

Round 2

20/06/2018
8:00 pm

| Corofin | 5-16 - 0-6 | Cortoon Shamrocks |

Tuam Stadium
Referee: Kieran Quinn
24/06/2018
3:15 pm

| St James' | 4-14 - 1-14 | Claregalway |

Tuam Stadium
Referee: P.J Rabbitte

Round 3

25/08/2018
4:45 pm

| Cortoon Shamrocks | 0-11 - 1-11 | St James' |

Kenny Park
Referee: James Molloy
25/08/2018
6:00 pm

| An Ceathru Rua | 1-8 - 5-16 | Corofin |

Clonbur
Referee: Ronan McNulty

Round 4

8/09/2018
6:00 pm

| Claregalway | 1-15 - 1-13 | Cortoon Shamrocks |

Corofin
Referee: Frank Kinneen
8/09/2018
6:00 pm

| St James' | 2-18 - 2-13 | An Ceathru Rua |

Pearse Stadium
Referee: Austin O Connell

Round 5

23/08/2018
3:30 pm

| Corofin | 0-15 - 1-8 | St James' |

Pearse Stadium
Referee: Anthony Coyne
22/08/2018
3:30 pm

| An Ceathru Rua | 1-16 - 3-12 | Claregalway |

Clonbur
Referee: Brenadan Kinneavy

=== Group 2 ===
| Pos | Team | Pld | W | D | L | PF | PA | PD | Pts |
|---|---|---|---|---|---|---|---|---|---|
| 1 | Annaghdown | 4 | 3 | 1 | 0 | 71 | 46 | +25 | 7 |
| 2 | Salthill/Knocknacarra | 4 | 2 | 1 | 1 | 52 | 47 | +5 | 5 |
| 3 | Kilannin | 4 | 1 | 3 | 0 | 56 | 53 | +3 | 5 |
| 4 | Tuam Stars | 4 | 1 | 0 | 3 | 61 | 71 | −10 | 2 |
| 5 | Barna | 4 | 0 | 1 | 3 | 48 | 71 | −23 | 1 |

Updated to match(es) played on unknown. Source:

Round 1

20/05/2018
3:45 pm

| Tuam Stars | 1-6 - 2-15 | Annaghdown |

Tuam Stadium
Referee: Muiris Mac Gearailt
19/05/2018
7:00 pm

| Kilannin | 0-13 - 1-10 | Salthill/Knocknacarra |

Maigh Cuilinn
Referee: Austin O Connell

Round 2

23/06/2018
7:30 pm

| Annaghdown | 2-10 - 1-13 | Kilannin |

Pearse Stadium
Referee: Gearoid O Conamha
24/06/2018
2:00 pm

| Barna | 0-19 - 3-16 | Tuam Stars |

Pearse Stadium
Referee: Noel Dempsey

Round 3

25/08/2018
7:00 pm

| Kilannin | 0-8 - 0-8 | Barna |

Pearse Stadium
Referee: Gearoid O Conamha
25/08/2018
6:30 pm

| Salthill/Knocknacarra | 0-8 - 1-13 | Annaghdown |

Kenny Park
Referee: Muiris Mac Gearailt

Round 4

9/09/2018
4:00 pm

| Tuam Stars | 3-7 - 1-16 | Kilannin |

Pearse Stadium
Referee: Tommy Faherty(S)
9/09/2018
2:15 pm

| Barna | 0-8 - 2-13 | Salthill/Knocknacarra |

Pearse Stadium
Referee: Martin Flaherty

Round 5

22/09/2018
3:45 pm

| Annaghdown | 1-16 - 1-10 | Barna |

Tuam Stadium
Referee: P. J. Rabbitte
23/09/2018
1:00 pm

| Salthill/Knocknacarra | 1-9 - 1-8 | Tuam Stars |

Corofin
Referee: Noel Dempsey

=== Group 3 ===
| Pos | Team | Pld | W | D | L | PF | PA | PD | Pts |
|---|---|---|---|---|---|---|---|---|---|
| 1 | Mountbellew/Moylough | 4 | 4 | 0 | 0 | 92 | 40 | +52 | 8 |
| 2 | Caherlistrane | 4 | 2 | 1 | 1 | 62 | 50 | +12 | 5 |
| 3 | Killererin | 4 | 1 | 2 | 1 | 53 | 68 | −15 | 4 |
| 4 | Kilconly | 4 | 1 | 0 | 3 | 53 | 76 | −23 | 2 |
| 5 | Naomh Anna Leitir Mor | 4 | 0 | 1 | 3 | 62 | 88 | −26 | 1 |

Updated to match(es) played on unknown. Source:

Round 1

19/05/2018
6:45 pm

| Kilconly | 0-7 - 1-12 | Mountbellew/Moylough |

Kenny Park
Referee: Brenadan Kinneavy
19/05/2018
7:00 pm

| Killererin | 2-7 - 0-13 | Caherlistrane |

Tuam Stadium
Referee: Frank Kinneen

Round 2

24/06/2018
5:00 pm

| Mountbellew/Moylough | 4-17 - 1-5 | Killererin |

Tuam Stadium
Referee: Muiris Mac Gearailt
24/06/2018
3:45 pm

| Naomh Anna Leitir Mor | 3-9 - 1-17 | Kilconly |

Pearse Stadium
Referee: James Molloy

Round 3

26/08/2018
4:45 pm

| Killererin | 1-11 - 1-11 | Naomh Anna Leitir Mor |

Pearse Stadium
Referee: Austin O Connell
26/08/2018
4:45 pm

| Caherlistrane | 0-8 - 0-10 | Mountbellew/Moylough |

Tuam Stadium
Referee: Shane Hehir

Round 4

8/09/2018
5:45 pm

| Kilconly | 1-9 - 2-12 | Killererin |

Tuam Stadium
Referee: Kieran Quinn
9/09/2018
2:30 pm

| Naomh Anna Leitir Mor | 2-7 - 1-13 | Caherlistrane |

Clonbur
Referee: James Molloy

Round 5

22/09/2018
5:15 pm

| Mountbellew/Moylough | 5-23 - 2-11 | Naomh Anna Leitir Mor |

Moycullen
Referee: Gearoid O Conamha
23/09/2018
2:30 pm

| Caherlistrane | 3-16 - 1-11 | Kilconly |

Tuam Stadium
Referee: Tommy Faherty

=== Group 4 ===
| Pos | Team | Pld | W | D | L | PF | PA | PD | Pts |
|---|---|---|---|---|---|---|---|---|---|
| 1 | Milltown | 4 | 4 | 0 | 0 | 85 | 53 | +32 | 8 |
| 2 | Moycullen | 4 | 2 | 1 | 1 | 71 | 46 | +25 | 5 |
| 3 | Monivea/Abbey | 4 | 2 | 1 | 1 | 54 | 46 | +8 | 5 |
| 4 | St Michael's | 4 | 1 | 0 | 3 | 51 | 71 | −20 | 2 |
| 5 | Caltra | 4 | 0 | 0 | 4 | 39 | 84 | −45 | 0 |

Updated to match(es) played on unknown. Source:

Round 1

19/05/2018
5:00 pm

| St Michael's | 1-5 - 2-10 | Monivea/Abbey |

Kenny Park
Referee: Anthony Coyne
20/05/2018
2:45 pm

| Caltra | 1-10 - 4-11 | Milltown |

Barnaderg
Referee: Shane Hehir

Round 2

23/06/2018
7:00 pm

| Monivea/Abbey | 0-15 - 0-10 | Caltra |

Tuam Stadium
Referee: Frank Kinneen
23/06/2018
5:45 pm

| Moycullen | 3-15 - 2-5 | St Michael's |

Pearse Stadium
Referee: Martin Flaherty

Round 3

25/08/2018
5:15 pm

| Caltra | 0-5 - 4-15 | Moycullen |

Pearse Stadium
Referee: Kieran Quinn
25/08/2018
6:45 pm

| Milltown | 1-17 - 0-15 | Monivea/Abbey |

Tuam Stadium
Referee: Tommy Faherty

Round 4

9/09/2018
4:15 pm

| St Michael's | 2-13 - 1-8 | Caltra |

Tuam Stadium
Referee: P. J. Rabbitte
8/09/2018
5:45 pm

| Moycullen | 1-9 - 3-13 | Milltown |

Kenny Park
Referee: Gearoid O Conamha

Round 5

23/09/2018
4:00 pm

| Monivea/Abbey | 0-8 - 0-8 | Moycullen |

Pearse Stadium
Referee: Frank Kinneen
22/09/2018
5:30 pm

| Milltown | 1-17 - 1-13 | St Michael's |

Tuam Stadium
Referee: Shane Hehir

== Knockout stage ==
Quarter-finals
QF 1
Mountbellew/Moylough | 1-13
Moycullen | 1-12
QF 2
Milltown | 1-16
Salthill-Knocknacarra | 3-13
QF 3
Annaghdown | 2-15
St James' | 2-9
QF 4
Corofin | 2-10
Caherlistrane | 1-06

Semi-finals
SF 1
Mountbellew/Moylough | 1-13
Salthill-Knocknacarra | 1-10
SF 2
Annaghdown | 0-08
Corofin | 0-12

Final
Final
Mountbellew/Moylough | 0-05
Corofin | 1-08

=== Quarter-finals ===
QF 1

6/10/2018
3:00 pm

| Annaghdown | 2-15 - 2-9 | St James' |

Pearse Stadium
Referee: Muiris Mac Gearailt

QF 2

6/10/2018
4:45 pm

| Mountbellew/Moylough | 1-13 - 1-12 (AET) | Moycullen |
|---|---|---|
| | FT Score: 1-11 - 1-11 |

Pearse Stadium
Referee: Tommy Faherty

QF 3

7/10/2018
2:00 pm

| Milltown | 0-12 - 1-09 (AET) | Salthill-Knocknacarra |

Tuam Stadium
Referee: Martin Flaherty

QF 3 - Replay

14/10/2018
3:15 pm

| Milltown | 1-16 - 3-13 (AET) | Salthill-Knocknacarra |
|---|---|---|
| | FT Score: 1-12 - 2-09 |

Pearse Stadium
Referee: Muiris Mac Gearailt

QF 4

7/10/2018
3:45 pm

| Corofin | 2-10 - 1-06 | Caherlistrane |

Tuam Stadium
Referee: James Molloy

=== Semi-finals ===
Semi-final 1

21/10/2018
1:30 pm

| Mountbellew/Moylough | 1-13 - 1-10 | Salthill-Knocknacarra |

Tuam Stadium
Referee: Gearoid O Conamha

Semi-final 2

21/10/2018
3:15 pm

| Annaghdown | 0-08 - 0-12 | Corofin |

Tuam Stadium
Referee: Frank Kinneen

=== Final ===
28/10/2018
3:00 pm

| Corofin | 0-07 - 0-07 | Mountbellew/Moylough |

Pearse Stadium
Referee: James Molloy

==== Final - Replay ====
4/11/2018
1:45 pm

| Corofin | 1-08 - 0-05 | Mountbellew/Moylough |

Pearse Stadium
Referee: Tommy Faherty

== Relegation playoffs ==
=== 4th Placed Group Teams Playoff ===
Open Draw to take place between the 4 groups 4th placed teams. The two winners retaining Senior status for next years competition, and the losers then competing in the Relegation Group stage.

- Group 1 4th Placed Team - An Cheathrú Rua
- Group 2 4th Placed Team - Tuam Stars
- Group 3 4th Placed Team - Kilconly
- Group 4 4th Placed Team - St Michael's

Game 1

6/10/2018
4:15 pm

| St Michael's | 0-15 - 0-12 | Kilconly |

Tuam Stadium
Referee: P.J. Rabbitte

Game 2

6/10/2018
4:15 pm

| Tuam Stars | 0-12 - 1-11(AET) | An Cheathrú Rua |

Clonbur
Referee: Anthony Coyne

Victories for both St Michael's and An Cheathrú Rua means that they retain their Senior status. Tuam Stars and Kilconly enter the relegation group stage

=== Relegation Group stage ===
Naomh Anna, Leitir Móir and Tuam Stars top their groups and retain their Senior status. Kilconly and Caltra finished bottom of their groups and will be relegated to compete in next years Intermediate competition. The two groups second placed teams, Cortoon Shamrocks and Barna, go into a relegation playoff game.

==== Group A ====
| Pos | Team | Pld | W | D | L | PF | PA | PD | Pts | Qualification or relegation |
|---|---|---|---|---|---|---|---|---|---|---|
| 1 | Leitir Móir | 2 | 1 | 1 | 0 | 25 | 19 | +6 | 3 | Retains Senior status |
| 2 | Cortoon Shamrocks | 2 | 1 | 1 | 0 | 24 | 20 | +4 | 3 | Relegation play-off |
| 3 | Kilconly | 2 | 0 | 0 | 2 | 21 | 31 | −10 | 0 | Relegated |

Updated to match(es) played on unknown. Source:

Game 1

07/10/2018
1:00 pm

| Naomh Anna, Leitir Móir | 1-06 - 0-09 | Cortoon Shamrocks |

Oughterard
Referee: Austin O Connell

Game 2

13/10/2018
3:00 pm

| Naomh Anna, Leitir Móir | 2-10 - 0-10 | Kilconly |

Clonbur
Referee: Noel Dempsey

Game 3

21/10/2018
11:00am

| Cortoon Shamrocks | 2-09 - 0-11 | Kilconly |

Caherlistrane
Referee: James Molloy

==== Group B ====
| Pos | Team | Pld | W | D | L | PF | PA | PD | Pts | Qualification or relegation |
|---|---|---|---|---|---|---|---|---|---|---|
| 1 | Tuam Stars | 2 | 2 | 0 | 0 | 33 | 17 | +16 | 4 | Retains Senior status |
| 2 | Barna | 2 | 1 | 0 | 1 | 34 | 17 | +17 | 2 | Relegation play-off |
| 3 | Caltra | 2 | 0 | 0 | 2 | 13 | 46 | −33 | 0 | Relegated |

Updated to match(es) played on unknown. Source:

Game 1

07/10/2018
3:00 pm

| Barna | 2-19 - 0-05 | Caltra |

Annaghdown
Referee: Richard Mc Nicholas

Game 2

13/10/2018
4:30 pm

| Caltra | 0-08 - 2-15 | Tuam Stars |

Corofin
Referee: Gerry Daly

Game 3

21/10/2018
11:00am

| Barna | 0-9 1-09 | Tuam Stars |

Annaghdown
Referee: Shane Hehir

=== 2nd Place Relegation Group Playoff ===
Relegation Playoff game played between the two 2nd placed Relegation group teams. Winner to retain Senior status for next years competition, and the loser relegated to next years Intermediate competition

- Group A 2nd Placed Team - Cortoon Shamrocks
- Group B 2nd Placed Team - Barna
4/11/2018
12:00 pm

| Cortoon Shamrocks | 1-08 - 0-11 | Barna |

Pearse Stadium
Referee: Noel Dempsey

==== 2nd Place Relegation Group Playoff Replay ====
10/11/2018
2:00 pm

| Cortoon Shamrocks | 0-05 - 1-11 | Barna |

Annaghdown
Referee: Martin Flaherty
