= St Grellan's GFC =

- Cumann Peile Ghrealláin Naofa
- County: Galway
- Colours: Black and Amber
- Grounds: Dunlo GAA Grounds
- Coordinates: 53°19′51.01″N 8°13′42.69″W

Playing kits
Standard colours

Senior Club Championships
	All Ireland	Connacht champions	Galway champions
Football:	-	1	20

St Grellan's Gaelic Football Club (Irish: Cumann Peile Ghrealláin Naofa) was a Gaelic Athletic Association club based in Ballinasloe, County Galway, Ireland.

The team was named in honour of Saint Grellan, patron saint of Ballinasloe.

St Grellan's GFC were the first club to win a record seven Galway county football titles in a row from 1913 to 1919 and were undefeated in the county championship from 1913 to 1930. In 1980, they were also the first Galway Club to reach an All-Ireland Senior Club Football Championship in 1980.

On 1 December 2005, St Grellan's merged with Ballinasloe Hurling Club to form Ballinasloe GAA.

== Honours ==
Senior

- Galway Senior Football Championships (20): 1913, 1914, 1915, 1916, 1917, 1918, 1919, 1922, 1923, 1924, 1925, 1926, 1927, 1928, 1929, 1939, 1944, 1945, 1979, 1980
- Connacht Senior Club Football Championships (1): 1979 (runners-up in 1980)
- All-Ireland Senior Club Football Championship (0): (runners-up in 1980)

Intermediate

- Galway Intermediate Football Championships (3): 1986, 1992, 2000

Junior

- Galway Junior Football Championships (1): 1997, 2012 (runners-up 2010)
- Connacht Junior Football Championships (1): 2012
- All-Ireland Junior Football Championships (1): 2013

U21

- Galway U21 'A' Football Championships (1): 1977 (runners-up in 1970, 1975)

Minor

- Galway Minor 'A' Football Championships (1): 1974 (runner-up in 1975, 1978, 1981 after Two Replays both involving Extra Time)
