= Patrick Kelly (Galway Gaelic footballer) =

Patrick Kelly is an Irish Gaelic footballer who plays for Mountbellew–Moylough and at senior level for the Galway county team.

Kelly played for Galway in the 2022 All-Ireland Senior Football Championship Final. He scored two goals for Galway to help them overcome Leitrim and gain a place in the 2022 Connacht Senior Football Championship final.

Kelly has also played association football (soccer) for Athlone Town.
