= St Michael's GAA (Galway) =

Gaelic football club in County Galway

St Michael's
- Naomh Micheál
- Founded: 1956
- County: Galway
- Colours: Blue and white
- Coordinates: 53°16′30″N 9°04′41″W

Playing kits
Standard colours

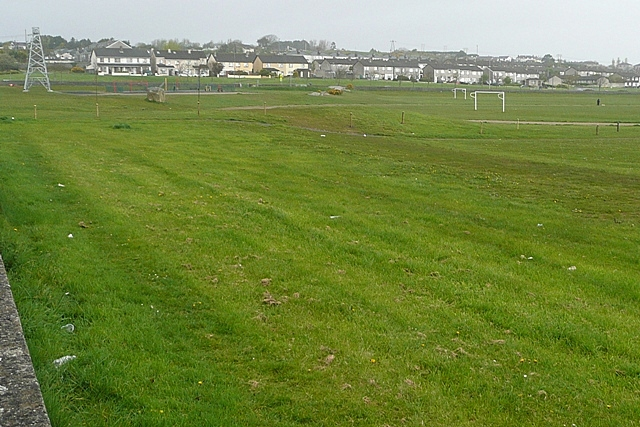
St. Michael's GAA ground in Galway

St Michael's Gaelic Football Club is a Gaelic football club based in Galway, Ireland.

== History ==
St Michael's was founded in 1956.

== Honours ==
=== Gaelic football ===
- Galway Intermediate Football Championship (3): 1985, 2008, 2024
