= Kilconly GAA =

Gaelic sports club in County Galway, Ireland

Kilconly
- Cill Chonla
- Founded: 1943
- County: Galway
- Colours: Green, Red & White
- Grounds: Kilconly GAA pitch
- Coordinates: 53°33′13.80″N 8°54′43.35″W

Playing kits
Standard colours

Kilconly GAA is a Gaelic Athletic Association club based in Kilconly, County Galway, Ireland. The club is a member of the Galway GAA, and is primarily focused on Gaelic football. Underage teams, up to U-18s, play in the Galway league and championships. The club competes at other levels within Galway's football competitions as well.

Kilconly gained senior status for the first time in its history by becoming Galway Intermediate champions 2011.

Kilconly GAA were chosen to compete in the 2010 season of Celebrity Bainisteoir, managed by Breffny Morgan (who had previously appeared on The Apprentice).

In December 2017, Kilconly were forced to wait 5 months to play the Division 6 [North] league final. A Facebook post described the delay as "blatant disregard for the club player, the lifeblood of the association".

== Honours ==
- Galway Intermediate Football Championship - winners 2011
