= CLG An Cheathrú Rua =

Gaelic games club in County Galway, Ireland

- Founded: 1967
- County: Galway
- Colours: Red and Black
- Grounds: Páirc an Chathánaigh, An Cheathrú Rua
- Coordinates: 53°15′26.20″N 9°36′03.46″W

Playing kits
Standard colours

Senior Club Championships
	All Ireland	Connacht champions	Galway champions
Football:	-	-	1

CLG An Cheathrú Rua is a Gaelic games club based in the Gaeltacht area of An Cheathrú Rua, County Galway, Ireland. It is a member of the Galway GAA branch of the Gaelic Athletic Association. Notable players to have played for the club include Seán Óg de Paor and Sean Ó Domhnaill, members of Galway's All-Ireland winning teams of 1998 and 2001.

In 1996, they became the first Gaeltacht, and second Connemara club to win the Galway Senior Football Championship beating Oranmore/Maree in the final. The only previous time the county championship was won by a Connemara side was in 1938 when it was won by Oughterard.

In 2022, the club lost the senior status that they had held since 1987, when they were crowned Galway Junior Football champions. Another demotion followed in 2023, with back-to-back relegations finding An Cheathrú Rua competing at the junior grade for the 2024 season.

A remarkable winning run followed in 2024, which saw them crowned Galway and Connacht Junior Club Football champions. An exciting semi-final victory over Offaly's Ballinagar in Hyde Park, Roscommon booked the Gaeltacht outfit an All-Ireland Club Football Final date at Croke Park.

They contested the All Ireland Junior Club Final vs Naomh Padraig Uisce Chaoin of Donegal. A tense affair with An Cheathrú Rua winning out by the minimum.

Captain Stiofan Ó Briain on the steps of the Hogan Stand lifted the Cup and then delivered an iconic speech as Gaeilge finishing it with "Hup Gaillimh, Hup Conamara and Hup An Cheathru Rua "

== Achievements ==
- Galway Senior Football Championship (1): 1996
- Galway Intermediate Football Championship (1): 1987
- Galway Junior Football Championship (1): 2024
- Connacht Junior Football Championship (1): 2024
- All-Ireland Junior Club Football Championship (1): 2025
- Comórtas Peile na Gaeltachta Champions (1): 1997
- Sweeney Oil Football League (1): 2008
- West Galway Under-21 A Football Championship (1): 2015
- West Galway Minor B2 Football League Champions (1): 2017
- West Galway Under 21 B Football Championship (2): 2013,2017

== Notable players ==
- Seán Óg de Paor
