= Monivea Abbey GAA =

Gaelic football club in County Galway, Ireland

Monivea - Abbey
- Mhuine an Mheá - Mainistir
- Founded: 1977
- County: Galway
- Nickname: Abbey, Monivea
- Colours: Sky blue, Red
- Grounds: Monivea Abbey GAA Grounds
- Coordinates: 53°22′39.48″N 8°41′56.54″W

Playing kits
Standard colours

Senior Club Championships
	All Ireland	Connacht champions	Galway champions
Football:	-	-	1
Hurling:	-	-	1

Monivea-Abbey is a Gaelic football club based in Monivea, County Galway, Ireland. It is a member of the Galway GAA branch of the Gaelic Athletic Association. Monivea-Abbey caters for the sport of Gaelic football.

== Notable players ==
- Cillian McDaid

== Honours ==
- Galway Senior Football Championship: 1992
- Galway Intermediate Football Championship: 2016, 2023
- Galway Junior Football Championship: 1999
- Galway Minor Football Championship: 1984
