= Oughterard GAA =

Gaelic football club based in Ireland

- Cumann Peile Seamus O'Maille Uachtar Árd
- Founded: 1908
- County: Galway
- Colours: Green and white
- Grounds: Corribdale, Oughterard
- Coordinates: 53.429°N 9.315°W

Playing kits
Standard colours

Senior Club Championships
	All Ireland	Connacht champions	Galway champions
Football:	0	0	1

Oughterard GAA (Irish: Cumann Peile Seamus O'Maille Uachtar Árd) is a Gaelic football club based in Oughterard, County Galway, Ireland. It is a member of the Galway GAA branch of the Gaelic Athletic Association. Oughterard had a hurling team in the 1920s, but is primarily a football club. Oughterard teams compete from the groups of under-6 to Senior.

The club facilities are situated in Corribdale on the Pier Road in Oughterard. They include two pitches, a full-size walled pitch, a training pitch, a 600 capacity covered stand, a small terrace, changing rooms, meeting rooms and other facilities. There is also a large car park that is in use by people using the surrounding Corribdale Trails.

== History ==
=== Foundation ===
Oughterard GAA was founded in 1908 by a group of local men with an interest in the sport. Gaelic football was brought to the town by a man called Mahony from County Tipperary.

=== County Championships ===
Oughterard's first county success was the 1919 Galway Junior Football Championship title, captained by John Joe D'Arcy from Maghera. The club takes its name from a member of that team, Seamus O Maille, a staunch member up to his execution in 1923.

1938 brought the club its first, and so far, only Galway Senior Football Championship title with a win over Ballinasloe. This team included All-Ireland medalists Frank Burke (Doorus) and Henry Kenny (Mayo).

=== Celebrity Bainisteoir ===
In 2011, Oughterard's Intermediate team took part in the RTÉ television programme Celebrity Bainisteoir. Oughterard played St Patrick's GAA of Donobate in County Dublin at home in Corribdale and won. They then played Lissan GAC, Derry GAA in the Semi-final at home and won again. In the final they took on Killeshin GAA, County Laois and at full time it was 0–12 to 0–12. Extra time was played and Killeshin came out on top with a score of 0–18 to 0–15.

=== All-Ireland Intermediate Winners 2019/20 ===
In January 2020, Oughterard's Intermediate Team won the 2019–20 All-Ireland Intermediate Club Football Championship final.

=== Further developments ===
Oughterard has a Ladies' Gaelic football club which was founded in 2019.

As of the 2024, Oughterard were in the West Board area of the Galway League and Championships at Junior and Juvenile level, and taking part in under-age and Junior competitions within the county.

As of 2025, the flagship (Senior) team is competing in the Galway Senior League Division 1.

== Crest ==
The Cumann Peile Seamus O'Maille Uachtar Árd crest was designed by local artist and former player John Thomas Gibbons. The crest consists of the bridge over the Owenriff river with the Catholic church behind it, a portrait of Seamus O'Maille and a salmon representing the Lough Corrib. The club colours of green and white are also in the crest. The crest won the overall award at the National Féile in 2004.

== Honours ==
- Galway Senior Football Championship (1): 1938
- All-Ireland Intermediate Club Football Championship (1): 2019–20
- Connacht Intermediate Club Football Championship (1): 2019
- Galway Intermediate Football Championship (4): 2019, 2001, 1996, 1984

== Notable players ==
- Matthew Tierney, appointed Galway senior vice-captain in 2022
