= Annaghdown GAA =

Gaelic sports club in County Galway, Ireland

Annaghdown GAC is a Gaelic Athletic Association club based in County Galway, Ireland. The club is a member of the Galway GAA and was founded in 1887. Underage teams in both hurling and football play in the Galway league and championships. Annaghdown are a dual club and cater for Gaelic football, hurling camogie and Ladies football. The camogie club was reestablished in 2022 building on the history of the previous camogie club in the parish in times past when Corrandrum fielded a team.

Annaghdown GAA club has its grounds in Cregg, County Galway. There are 2 full GAA pitches located on the grounds. There is a stand which accommodates up to 550 standing persons. Annaghdown wear Maroon and White.

Annaghdown Handball Club has a 40x20 alley which was first built in 1978. It has a full back glass wall, and a large viewing area. It's located in Annaghdown itself, beside Annaghdown National School.

== Football ==
=== Honours ===
- Galway Senior Football Championships (5): 1931, 1982, 1985, 1987, 2001
- Galway Senior Football Leagues (5): 1975, 1976, 1983, 2006, 2013
- Galway Intermediate Football Championship (1): 1990
- Galway Intermediate Football League (1): 1997
- Galway Junior 'A' Football Championships (5): 1938, 1956, 1958, 1970, 2021
- Galway Junior 'B' Football Championships (1): 2000
- Galway Under-21 'A' Football Championship (1): 2009
- Galway Under-21 'B' Football Championship (1): 1997

== Hurling ==
Hurling has been played in Annaghdown parish since the foundation of the GAA. There are several references to teams from the parish affiliating on and off over the years. In the 1950 and '60's Annaghdown had very strong hurling teams winning several North Board Junior Championships but never actually winning out the County Junior Championship proper. In the early '60's Annaghdown entered the Intermediate Championship and almost went Senior in the mid-sixties, but, due to retirements and emigration, they resorted to the Junior grade after a few years.

In the 1970s, Brother Vincent, a monk who taught in Corrandulla school, and a native of Kilkenny, started juvenile coaching and this work saw Annaghdown win several underage titles in the '80's, culminating in the winning of the 1980 Feile na Gael All-Ireland U14 title. The work started by Brother Vincent was continued by Bernard Naughton who set up hurling in the GAA club which was dominated by football before this originally from Turloughmore, and it has seen Annaghdown being competitive at underage since. In the last decade Annaghdown’s fortunes have improved at adult level with the club's top hurling team now trading its wares in the highly competitive Intermediate grade, reaching the semi-final for the first time in 2008.

At present there is a very strong cohort of people taking charge of underage teams in the club, fielding teams from U-8 right up to Intermediate level. Annaghdown also field teams in all grades of football and have won many titles including five county senior football championships in 1931, 1982, 1985, 1987 and 2001.

=== Notable players ===
- Damien Comer

Tom Naughton

=== Honours ===
- All-Ireland Feile Na Gael Division 4 Hurling (1): 1980
- Connacht Junior Club Hurling Championship (1): 2014
- Galway Junior A Hurling Championship (2): 2002, 2014
- Galway Junior 1 Hurling Championship (1): 2014
- Galway Junior B Hurling Championship (3): 1979, 1987, 2000
- Galway Junior C Hurling Championship (1): 1999
- Galway Junior C Special Hurling Championship (1): 1999
- Galway Under-21 B Hurling Championship (1): 1985
- Galway Under-21 C Hurling Championship (1): 2003

== Ladies' Gaelic Football ==
Annaghdown reached the All-Ireland Ladies' Intermediate Club Football final in 2024 and were defeated by Bennekerry/Tinryland by 2-10 to 1-07. Annaghdown also previously won this competition in 2016
