= CLG Bhearna =

Gaelic sports club in County Galway, Ireland

- CLG Bhearna
- Founded: 1965
- County: Galway
- Nickname: The Foxes
- Colours: Orange and Black
- Grounds: Bearna / Na Forbacha
- Coordinates: 53°16′05.38″N 9°09′46.07″W

Playing kits
Standard colours

CLG Bhearna is a Gaelic Athletic Association club based in Bearna, County Galway, Ireland. The club is a member of the Galway GAA. The club was merged with Spiddal at U16, U18 and U21 during the 1990s before reverting to its old form again in 2001.

CLG Bhearna were promoted to Senior Level for the first time in 1972 and have competed in the Galway Senior Club Football Championship over the years. They are one of 20 clubs who challenge for county title today.

== Honours ==
- Galway Division 2 Football League (1): 2023
- Galway Intermediate Football League (1): 1998
- Galway West Football League Championship (2): 1979, 1998
- Galway West Junior A Championship (1): 1989
- Galway West Under-21 A Football Championship (2): 2000, 2014
- Galway Under-21 B Football Championship (1): 1989
- Galway West Board Under-21 B Football Championship (1): 1989, 2006
- Galway Minor B Football Championship (1): 2005
- Galway West Minor B Football Championship (1): 2005
- Galway West Minor B Football League (1): 2003

== Notable players ==
Seán Fitzgerald
