= Mountbellew–Moylough GAA =

Gaelic sports club in County Galway, Ireland

Mountbellew–Moylough
- An Creagan–Maugh Locha
- Founded: 1887
- County: Galway
- Colours: Black & Amber
- Grounds: Páirc an Chreagáin, Mountbellew
- Coordinates: 53°28′25.43″N 8°30′15.19″W

Playing kits
Standard colours

Senior Club Championships
	All Ireland	Connacht champions	Galway champions
Football:	-	-	5

Mountbellew–Moylough (Irish: An Creagán/Maugh Locha) is a Gaelic Athletic Association club based in County Galway, Ireland. The club is a member of the Galway GAA. The club was formerly known as Mountbellew before amalgamating with Moylough.

On 14 November 2021, they won their first Galway Senior Club Football Championship title since 1986 with a win over reigning All-Ireland club champions Corofin.

== Honours ==
- Galway Senior Club Football Championships: 5
  - 1964, 1965, 1974, 1986, 2021

== Notable players ==
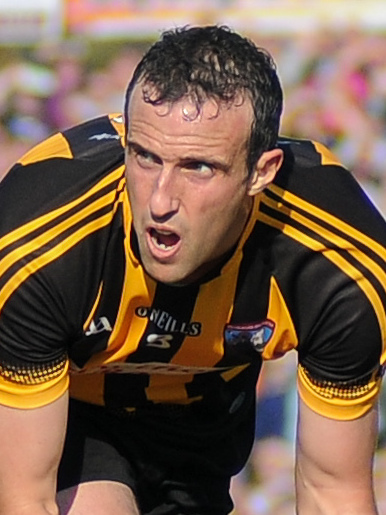
Joe Bergin in 2015

- Joe Bergin
- Enda Colleran
- John Daly
- Val Daly
- Eoin Finnerty
- Johnny Hughes
- Patrick Kelly
- Stephen White
