= Killannin GAA =

Gaelic sports club in County Galway, Ireland

Killannin
- Cill Ainín
- Founded: 1958
- County: Galway
- Colours: Blue and White
- Grounds: Maloney Park
- Coordinates: 53°23′14.24″N 9°13′36.21″W

Playing kits
Standard colours

Killannin is a Gaelic Athletic Association club based in County Galway, Ireland. The club is a member of the Galway GAA. The club is one of 18 teams competing in the Senior Championship in Galway. Their best result in the competition came in 2000, where they reached the final, losing out narrowly to Corofin.

== History ==
Kevin Walsh, Gary Fahey and his brother Richie Fahey, along with Noel Maloney ( Former All Star) were all involved in Galway's 1998 and 2001 All-Ireland Senior Football Championship (SFC) title wins. Walsh won an All Star Award in 2003 and later managed Sligo and Galway. Walsh's first involvement with Galway was winning an All-Ireland Minor Football Championship medal in 1986. Fahey captained Galway to the 2001 All-Ireland SFC win.

Johnny Heaney was part of the team that qualified for the 2022 and 2023 All-Ireland Senior Football Championship Final.

== Honours ==
- Galway Intermediate Football Championship (2): 1991, 2014
- Galway Under-21 A Football Championship (2): 1996, 2001
- Galway Under-19 A Football Championship (1): 2023
