= List of Connacht Senior Football Championship winners =

This is a list of all teams and players who have won the Connacht Senior Football Championship since its inception.

== By year ==
All-Ireland champions
All-Ireland runners-up

Year	Winners	Score	Runners-up	Score	Venue	Winning Captain	Winning team
1977	Roscommon	1-12	Galway	2-08	Dr Hyde Park	Mickey Freyne	G O'Dowd, H Keegan, P Lindsay, T Heneghan, T Donnellan, R O'Beirne, D Murray, M McDermott, E McManus, D Earley, M Freyne, T McManus, J O'Connor, P Cox, M Menton. Subs: M Keegan, J O'Gara, M Dolphin.
1978	Roscommon	2-07	Galway	0-09	Pearse Stadium		G Sheerin, H Keegan, P Lindsay, T Heneghan, E McManus, T Donnellan, D Murray, D Earley, J O'Gara, S Kilbride, M Freyne, M Menton, M Finneran, T McManus, J O'Connor. Subs: M Dolphin, L O'Gara, M Keegan.
1979	Roscommon	3-15	Mayo	2-10	MacHale Park	Pat Lindsay	J McDermott, H Keegan, P Lindsay, T Heneghan, G Fitzmaurice, T Donnellan, D Murray, D Earley, S Hayden, J O'Connor, J O'Gara, S Kilbride, T McManus, M Freyne, E McManus. Sub: M Finneran.
1980	Roscommon	3-13	Mayo	0-08	Dr Hyde Park	Danny Murray	G Sheerin, H Keegan, P Lindsay, G Connellan, G Fitzmaurice, T Donnellan, D Murray, D Earley, S Hayden, J O'Connor, J O'Gara, A Dooley, M Finneran, T McManus, E McManus.
1981	Mayo	0-12	Sligo	0-04	MacHale Park	Martin Carney	M Webb, M Gavin, A Egan, A Garvey, H Gavin, T Kearney, M O'Toole, WJ Padden, W Nally, L Lyons, J Maughan, M Carney, T Reilly, J Burke, J McGrath. Subs: G O'Malley, G Feeney.
1982	Galway	3-17	Mayo	0-10	Tuam Stadium		P. Coyne; P. Moran, S. Kinneavy, M. Coleman; P. O'Neill, T. Tierney, S. McHugh; B. Talty, P. Connolly; B. Brennan, V. Daly, R. Lee; T. Naughton, G. McManus, S. Joyce. Subs: P. Conroy, W. Joyce, J. Coleman.
1983	Galway	1-13	Mayo	1-10	Pearse Stadium	Séamus McHugh	P. Coyne; J. Hughes, S. Kinneavy, M. Coleman; P. O'Neill, P. Lee, S. McHugh; B. Talty, R. Lee; B. Brennan, V. Daly, B. O'Donnell; P. Kelly, G. McManus, S. Joyce. Subs: P. Connolly, R. Lee, T. Naughton.
1984	Galway	2-13	Mayo	2-09	Pearse Stadium	Séamus McHugh	P. Comer; J. Kelly, S. Kinneavy, S. McHugh; P. O'Neill, P. Lee, M. Coleman; B. Talty, T. Tierney; M. Brennan, B. O'Donnell, P. Kelly; S. Joyce, G. McManus, K. Clancy. Subs: P. Moran, V. Daly, R. Lee.
1985	Mayo	2-11	Roscommon	0-08	Dr Hyde Park		E Lavin, M Carney, P Forde, D Flanagan, F Noone, J Maughan, J Finn, TJ Kilgallon, WJ Padden, H Gavin, J Burke, N Durcan, K McStay, S Lowry, E McHale. Subs: P Brogan, D McGrath, B Fitzpatrick.
1986	Galway	1-08	Roscommon	1-05	Dr Hyde Park		P. Comer; J. Fallon, S. McHugh, G. Dolan; E. Guirin, T. Tierney, A. O'Shea; B. Talty, V. Daly; R. Fahy, G. McManus, P. Kelly; B. Brennan, B. O'Donnell, M. Brennan. Subs: M. Coleman, R. Flaherty, S. Joyce.
1987	Galway	0-08	Mayo	0-07	MacHale Park	Val Daly	P. Comer; J. Fallon, F. Broderick, S. McHugh; A. Mulholland, T. Tierney, M. Coleman; B. Talty, H. Blehen; J. Joyce, V. Daly, P. Kelly; S. Joyce, B. O'Donnell, G. McManus. Subs: P. Larkin, N. Mannion, C. O'Dea.
1988	Mayo	1-12	Roscommon	0-08	Dr Hyde Park	Dermot Flanagan	E Lavin, J Browne, M Collinsm D Dearney, F Noone, D Flanagan, J Finn, TJ Kilgallon, S Maher, M Butler, L McHale, N Durkin, T Reilly, T Morgan, M Carney. Subs: J Burke, WJ Padden.
1989	Mayo	3-14 (0-12)	Roscommon	2-13 (1-09)	Dr Hyde Park	Jimmy Browne	G Irwin, J Browne, P Ford, D Flanagan, F Noone, TJ Kilgallon, J Finn, S Maher, L McHale, R Dempsey, WJ Padden, N Durkin, M Fitzmaurice, J Bourke, K McStay. Subs: M Collins, A Finnerty, M Feeney, B Kilkelly, MJ Mullen.
1990	Roscommon	0-16	Galway	1-11	Dr Hyde Park	Paul Earley	P Staunton, G Wynne, P Doorey, D Newton, J Connaughton, D Grady, P Hickey, S Killoran, J Newton, T Crehan, E McManus, A Leylan, T Lennon, P Earley, T McManus. Subs: V Glennon, P McNeill.
1991	Roscommon	0-13 (0-14)	Mayo	1-09 (0-14)	Dr Hyde Park	John Newton	G Sheerin, D Newton, P Doorey, E Gavin, J Connaughton, P Hickey, M Reilly, S Killoran, J Newton, T Grehan, T McManus, V Glennon, M Donlon, P Earley, D Duggan. Sub: E McManus.
1992	Mayo	1-14	Roscommon	0-10	MacHale Park	Peter Forde	G Irwin, K Beirne, P Forde, D Flanagan, A McGarry, T Tierney, P Butler, S Maher, TJ Kilgallon, J Jennings, L McHale, T Morley, B Kilkenny, R Dempsey, A Finnerty. Subs: K Staunton, P Brogan.
1993	Mayo	1-05	Roscommon	0-07	Dr Hyde Park	Kevin Beirne	G Irwin, K Beirne, K Cahill, D Flanagan, A McGarry, P Holmes, J Finn, L McHale, S Maher, K O'Neill, K Staunton, T Morley, N Durkin, R Dempsey, PJ Loftus. Subs: TJ Kilgallon, A Finnerty, T Tierney.
1994	Leitrim	0-12	Mayo	2-04	Dr Hyde Park	Declan Darcy	M McHugh, F Reynolds, S Quinn, J Honeyman, N Moran, D Darcy, G Flanagan, P Kieran, P O'Donoghue, M Quinn, G Dugdale, P Kenny, A Rooney, C McGlynn, L Conlon. Subs: J Ward, B Breen.
1995	Galway	0-17	Mayo	1-07	St Jarlath's Park	Jarlath Fallon	C. McGinley; J. Kilraine, G. Fahey, K. Fallon; R. Silke, D. Mitchell, S. De Paor; F. Gavin, T. Mannion; J. Fallon, K. Walsh, T. Wilson; N. Finnegan, V. Daly, F. O'Neill. Sub: A. Mulholland.
1996	Mayo	3-09	Galway	1-11	MacHale Park	Noel Connelly	J Madden, K Mortimer, K Cahill, A McGarry, P Holmes, J Nallen, N Connelly, L McHale, D Brady, J Horan, C McManamon, M Sheridan, A Finnerty, J Casey, R Dempsey: Sub: PJ Loftus.
1997	Mayo	0-11	Sligo	1-07	Dr Hyde Park	Noel Connelly	P Burke, K Mortimer, P Holmes, D Flanagan, F Costello, J Nallen, N Connelly, L McHale, D Fallon, D Nestor, J Horan, M Sheridan, K McDonald, J Casey, R Golding. Subs: K O'Neill, D Byrne.
1998	Galway	1-17 (0-11)	Roscommon	0-17 (0-11)	Dr Hyde Park	Ray Silke	M. McNamara; T. Meehan, G. Fahey, T. Mannion; R. Silke, J. Divilly, S. De Paor; K. Walsh, S. Ó Domhnaill; T. Joyce, J. Fallon, M. Donnellan; D. Savage, P. Joyce, N. Finnegan. Subs: S. Walsh, D. Mitchell, F. Gavin.
1999	Mayo	1-14	Galway	1-10	St Jarlath's Park	Kenneth Mortimer	P Burke, A Higgins, K Cahill, G Morley, P Costello, D Heaney, A Roche, J Nallen, D Brady, C McManamon, J Horan, K Mortimer, M Sheridan, J Casey, D Nestor. Subs: P Fallon, K McDonald.
2000	Galway	1-13	Leitrim	0-08	Dr Hyde Park	Pádraic Joyce	M. McNamara; T. Meehan, G. Fahey, R. Silke; D. Meehan, J. Killeen, S. De Paor; S. Ó Domhnaill, J. Bergin; P. Clancy, T. Joyce, M. Donnellan; D. Savage, P. Joyce, N. Finnegan; Subs: S. Walsh, J. Donnellan, K. Walsh.
2001	Roscommon	2-10	Mayo	1-12	Dr Hyde Park	Fergal O'Donnell	D Thompson, D Gavin, J Whyte, M Ryan, C McDonald, F Grehan, P Noone, F McDonnell, S O’Neill, C Connelly, J Hanley, S Lohan, N Dineen, G Lohan, F Grehan. Subs: G Cox, D Connellan, J Dunnine, A Nolan.
2002	Galway	1-11	Sligo	0-11	MacHale Park	Pádraic Joyce	A. Keane; K. Fitzgerald, G. Fahey, R. Fahey; D. Meehan, T. Mannion, S. De Paor; K. Walsh, M. Donnellan; P. Clancy, T. Joyce, J. Bergin; D. Savage, P. Joyce, M. Clancy. Sub: J. Fallon.
2003	Galway	1-14	Mayo	0-13	Pearse Stadium	Kevin Walsh	B. O'Donoghue; K. Fitzgerald, G. Fahey, M. Comer; D. Meehan, R. Fahey, S. De Paor; K. Walsh, J. Bergin; P. Clancy, M. Clancy, J. Fallon; D. Savage, P. Joyce, N. Joyce; Subs: M. Meehan, M. Donnellan, T. Joyce, D. O'Brien.
2004	Mayo	2-13	Galway	0-09	MacHale Park	Fergal Costello	F Ruddy, C Moran, D Heaney, G Ruane, G Mullins, J Nallen, F Costello, D Brady, R McGarrity, J Gill, K McDonald, A Dillon, C Mortimer, T Mortimer, B Maloney. Subs: P Gardiner, P Kelly, A Moran, A O’Malley, D Sweeney.
2005	Galway	0-10	Mayo	0-08	Pearse Stadium	Pádraic Joyce	B. O'Donoghue; A. Burke, F. Hanley, K. Fitzgerald; D. Meehan, P. Clancy, D. Burke; B. Cullinane, N. Coleman; M. Clancy, M. Donnellan, K. Comer; M. Meehan, P. Joyce, D. Savage; Subs: S. Armstrong, T. Giblin, P. Geraghty, S. De Paor.
2006	Mayo	0-12	Galway	1-08	MacHale Park	David Heaney	J Healy; D Geraghty, L O’Malley, K Higgins; D Heaney, J Nallen, P Gardiner; R McGarrity, P Harte; BJ Padden, G Brady, A Dillon; A Moran, C Mortimer, C McDonald. Subs: K O’Neill, T Mortimer.
2007	Sligo	1-10	Galway	0-12	Dr Hyde Park	Noel McGuire	P Greene; C Harrison, N McGuire, R Donovan; P McGovern, M McNamara, J Davey; E O'Hara, K Quinn; B Curran, B Egan, S Davey; D Kelly, M Breheny, J McPartland. Subs: K Sweeney, P Doohan, A Marren, B Phillips.
2008	Galway	2-12	Mayo	1-14	MacHale Park	Pádraic Joyce	P. Doherty; G. Bradshaw, F. Hanley, D. Burke; N Coyne, D. Blake, G. Sice; B. Cullinane, N. Coleman; M. Clancy, P. Joyce, F. Breathnach; C. Bane, M. Meehan, N. Joyce. Subs: K. Fitzgerald, S. Armstrong, P. Conroy, M. Lydon.
2009	Mayo	2-12	Galway	1-14	Pearse Stadium	Trevor Mortimer	K O’Malley; L O’Malley, G Cafferkey, K Higgins; P Gardiner, T Howley, A Moran; D Heaney, R McGarritty; P Harte, A Dillon, T Mortimer; A Kilcoyne, B Moran, A O’Shea. Subs: D Vaughan, C Mortimer, M Ronaldson, T Parsons.
2010	Roscommon	0-14	Sligo	0-13	MacHale Park	Peter Domican	G Claffey; S McDermott, P Domican, S Ormsby; S Purcell, C Dineen, D Casey; M Finneran, K Mannion; D Keenan, D O’Gara, C Cregg; J Rogers, D Shine, G Heneghan. Subs: K Higgins, J Dunning, P Garvey.
2011	Mayo	0-13	Roscommon	0-11	Dr Hyde Park	Alan Dillon	R. Hennelly; K. Higgins, A Feeney, T. Cunniffe; R. Feeney, D. Vaughan, T. Mortimer; A. O'Shea, S. O'Shea; K. McLaughlin, A. Dillon, A. Moran; C. O'Connor, A. Freeman, J. Doherty. Subs: G. Cafferkey, E. Varley, R. McGarrity, P. Gardiner.
2012	Mayo	0-12	Sligo	0-10	Dr Hyde Park	Andy Moran	D. Clarke; K. Keane, G. Cafferkey, K. Higgins; L. Keegan, D. Vaughan, C. Boyle; B. Moran, D Geraghty; K. McLaughlin, C. O'Connor, A. Dillon; E. Varley, A. Moran, J. Doherty. Subs: A. O'Shea, M. Conroy, A. Freeman.
2013	Mayo	5-11	London	0-10	MacHale Park	Andy Moran	R. Hennelly; T. Cunniffe, C. Barrett, G. Cafferkey; L. Keegan, K. Higgins, C. Boyle; A. O'Shea, S. O'Shea; K. McLaughlin, A. Dillon, R. Feeney; D. Coen, A. Freeman, A. Moran. Subs: C. O'Connor, M. Conroy, D. Vaughan, E. Varley, S. McHale.
2014	Mayo	3-14	Galway	0-16	MacHale Park	Andy Moran	R. Hennelly; C. Barrett, G. Cafferkey, K. Higgins; L. Keegan, C. Boyle, D. Vaughan; S. O'Shea, B. Moran, K. McLaughlin, A. O'Shea, J. Doherty; C. O'Connor, A. Moran, A. Dillon. Subs: M. Conroy, A. Freeman, J. Gibbons, K. Keane, D. O'Connor, M. Sweeney.
2015	Mayo	6-25	Sligo	2-11	Dr Hyde Park	Keith Higgins	D. Clarke; D. Vaughan, G. Cafferkey, T. Cunniffe; K. Higgins, C. Boyle, L. Keegan; T. Parsons, A. O'Shea; D. O'Connor, S. O'Shea, J. Doherty; A. Moran, K. McLaughlin, C. O'Connor. Subs: B. Moran, A. Dillon, B. Harrison, M. Ronaldson, P. Durcan, C. Barrett.
2016	Galway	3-16 (0-13)	Roscommon	0-14 (1-10)	MacHale Park	Gary O'Donnell	B. Power; E. Kerin, D. Kyne, D. Wynne; G. O'Donnell, L. Silke, G. Bradshaw; P. Conroy, T. Flynn; G. Sice, E. Brannigan, J. Heaney; D. Cummins, D. Comer, S. Walsh. Subs: A. Varley, P. Sweeney, F. Hanley, P. Varley, E. Hoare, P. Cooke
2017	Roscommon	2-15	Galway	0-12	Pearse Stadium	Ciarán Murtagh	C Lavin; D Murray, N McInerney, J McManus; S McDermott, S Mullooly, C Devaney; T O’Rourke, E Smith; F Cregg, N Kilroy, B Stack; C Connolly, D Murtagh, C Murtagh. Subs: G Patterson, I Kilbride, S Killoran, D Smith, Colin Compton,
2018	Galway	0-16	Roscommon	2-06	Dr Hyde Park	Damien Comer	R. Lavelle; D. Kyne, S. Ó Ceallaigh, D. Wynne; C. Sweeney, G. Bradshaw, J. Heaney; P. Conroy, T. Flynn; S. Kelly, B. McHugh, E. Brannigan, D. Comer, I. Burke, S. Walsh. Subs: C. Duggan; S. Armstrong, E. Kerin, P. Cooke, A. Varley, G. O'Donnell
2019	Roscommon	1-13	Galway	0-12	Pearse Stadium	Enda Smith	D O'Malley; D Murray, S Mullooly, C Daly; N Daly, C Hussey, R Daly; T O'Rourke, S Killoran; C Devaney, C Cregg, N Kilroy; D Murtagh, C Cox, E Smith. Subs: H Darcy, C Compton, C McKeon, A Glennon, B Stack.
2020	Mayo	0-14	Galway	0-13	Pearse Stadium	Aidan O'Shea	D. Clarke; P. Durcan, C. Barrett, O. Mullin; S. Coen, L. Keegan, E. McLaughlin; C. Loftus, M. Ruane; K. McLaughlin, R. O'Donoghue, D. O'Connor; T. Conroy, A. O'Shea, C. O'Connor. Subs: B. Walsh, J. Flynn, M. Moran, K. Higgins, F. McDonagh.
2021	Mayo	2-14	Galway	2-08	Croke Park	Aidan O'Shea	R. Hennelly; L. Keegan, P. O'Hora, M. Plunkett; P. Durcan, O. Mullin, S. Coen; M. Ruane, A. O'Shea; B. Walsh, D. O'Connor, C. Loftus; T. Conroy, D. McHale, R. O'Donoghue. Subs: K. McLaughlin, E. McLaughlin; R. Brickenden; E. Hession; J. Carr; C. O’Shea.
