= 1983 All-Ireland Senior Football Championship final =

- Event: 1983 All-Ireland Senior Football Championship
| Dublin | Galway |
| 1–10 (13) | 1–8 (11) |
- Date: 18 September 1983
- Venue: Croke Park, Dublin
- Referee: John Gough (Antrim)
- Attendance: 71,988

The 1983 All-Ireland Senior Football Championship final, also known as the Game of Shame (Irish: An Cluiche Náireach), was the 96th All-Ireland Final and the deciding match of the 1983 All-Ireland Senior Football Championship, an inter-county Gaelic football tournament for the top teams in Ireland.

This was one of the 13 consecutive All-Ireland SFC finals contested by either Dublin or Kerry between 1974 and 1986, a period when one of either team always contested the decider.

Four players (three representing Dublin, one representing Galway) were sent off, earning the Dublin team the epithet "The Dirty Dozen". The game was marred by scenes of thuggery and ugliness. Galway had also lost to Dublin in their previous All-Ireland SFC final appearance in 1974. Earlier in the game, Barney Rock had scored an 11th-minute goal, but all was overshadowed by what followed.

== Route to the final ==
Both Dublin and Galway were fortunate to have reached the final at all, as both needed late goals in the semi-finals just to stay in the championship.

Dublin salvaged a draw with Cork thanks to a Barney Rock goal in injury time, before beating them in a memorable replay at Páirc Uí Chaoimh. That replay was the first All-Ireland SFC semi-final to be held outside Croke Park since 1941.

Galway narrowly overcame an unfortunate Donegal by 1–12 to 1–11, with Val Daly scoring Galway's goal.

Supporters anticipated an eventful game. Both counties had a proud footballing tradition, and this was also the first final since 1977 that did not involve Kerry.

== Match ==
Note that the 1942 All-Ireland SFC final between the teams had the same scoreline.

=== Summary ===
Conditions were terrible on the day of the match, with a gale-force wind and driving rain making it impossible for the players to play constructive football, and the physical battle was more intense than usual. The game was full of dangerous sliding tackles and players involved themselves in many heated exchanges.

It is impossible to locate the exact source of the disgraceful scenes which marred the final. There was no history of violence in previous clashes between the sides. Dublin's Barney Rock scored a bizarre goal from 40 yards after a poor free-out from Galway goalkeeper Pádraig Coyne. Galway objected. They claimed the goal should not have been allowed due to Dublin manager Kevin Heffernan interfering with play as he tended to the injured Joe McNally. Referee John Gough did not agree and the goal stood.

Soon after that, things began to go wrong for Dublin. After a tussle in midfield, Dublin legend Brian Mullins swung back his arm and struck Brian Talty, sending him crashing to the ground. The referee promptly sent Mullins off. Mullins said of his assault on Talty: "If I look back on it, a lot of thoughts run through my mind. It happened and I had to accept it". Shortly before half-time, several players clashed beneath the Hogan Stand and, to the crowd's astonishment, referee Gough sent off a player from each side — Ray Hazley from Dublin and Tomás Tierney of Galway. Stephen Joyce, who was also playing for Galway that day, said: "In my view neither player deserved to be given their marching orders".

The referee blew his whistle to end the first half, which brought a ceasefire of sorts. However, players continued to clash in the tunnel and — while rumours circulated for years about the incident — word of whatever happened in the tunnel remained there. Galway's Brian Talty did not return for the second half. The mysterious Val Joyce said Mullins was the perpetrator: "Brian Mullins came in after for Brian Talty. I ran in and stood in his way". Whatever peace remained was swiftly dispensed with when, five minutes after the restart, Dublin's Kieran Duff lifted his foot towards the face of Pat O Neill, who lay stricken on the ground. The referee promptly sent Duff off.

Thus, it was fourteen-man Galway against twelve-man Dublin for most of the second half. Dublin's "Dirty Dozen" or "Twelve Apostles", as they were to become known, sat back and defended against Galway's forward play. Dublin held out to win the game by a slim margin of just two points (1–10 to 1–8). But the circumstances overshadowed this achievement.

=== Details ===
18 September 1983
Final

| Dublin | 1–10 – 1–8 | Galway |
|---|---|---|
| B Rock 1–6, J Ronayne 0–1, PJ Buckley 0–1, J McNally 0–1, K Duff 0–1 | | S Joyce 1–1, B Brennan 0–3, M Coleman 0–1, S McHugh 0–1, G McManus 0–1, M Brennan 0–1 |

Croke Park, Dublin
Attendance: 71,988
Referee: John Gough (Antrim)

Dublin
Galway

==== Dublin ====
- 1 J. O'Leary
- 2 M. Holden
- 3 G. Hargan
- 4 R. Hazley
- 5 P. Canavan
- 6 T. Drumm (c)
- 7 P. J. Buckley
- 8 J. Ronayne
- 9 B. Mullins
- 10 B. Rock
- 11 T. Conroy
- 12 K. Duff
- 13 J. Caffrey
- 14 A. O'Toole
- 15 J. McNally

Subs used
18 J. Kearns for T. Conroy
26 C. Maher for T. Conroy

Subs not used
16 M. Kennedy
17 A. McCaul
19 B. Jordan
20 C. Redmond
21 F. McGrath
22 V. Conroy
23 W. Hughes
24 P. Ryan
25 R. Crean
27 D. McGrath

Manager
K. Heffernan

==== Galway ====
- 1 P. Coyne
- 2 J. Hughes
- 3 S. Kinneavy
- 4 M. Coleman
- 5 P. O'Neill
- 6 P. Lee
- 7 S. McHugh (c)
- 8 B. Talty
- 9 R. Lee
- 10 B. Brennan
- 11 V. Daly
- 12 B. O'Donnell
- 13 T. Tierney
- 14 G. McManus
- 15 S. Joyce

Subs used
19 M. Brennan for B. Talty
21 W. Joyce for P. Lee
24 J. Tobin for J. Hughes

Subs not used
16 N. Hynes
17 P. Connolly
18 F. Broderick
20 T. Naughton
22 P. Kelly
23 T. J. Gilmore
25 M. Joyce

Manager
M. McDonagh

== Post-match ==
Martin Breheny interviewed the players from both teams in their dressing rooms. Journalists were permitted to do so at the time, and, on this occasion, were not prevented from going about their business by the dirtiness of the game, though the practice would later cease. While towelling himself down, one of the Dublin men sent off, Kieran Duff, quietly explained to Breheny what had happened: "I was provoked. I pleaded my case with the referee, but all he did was take my name and order me off without so much as a how's your father".

The following morning's newspapers coverage had very little to do with the actual game, but focused on the ugliness of the match and also reported on the poor supervision at exits and the terrible crushing in the Canal End and on Hill 16, where a fan was stabbed. There were reports of clashes amongst supporters after the match and of buses full of Galway fans being stoned as they left Dublin.

After the match some Galway officials deemed Dublin to be a squad of hitmen with no regard for decency or fair play.

The pressure was on the GAA authorities to act fast and deal with the controversy on the pitch, but it took weeks for the organisation to sort out all the disciplinary matters arising from the final. When the punishments were announced Dublin felt aggrieved believing they were handed far too much of the responsibility for the controversies. Ciaran Duff was banned for 12 months, Brian Mullins for 5 months, their manager Kevin Heffernan received a 3-month ban while Ray Hazley got a month. 2 players from Galway, Tomás Tierney and Peter Lee were both suspended for 1 month each. Both county boards were also fined.

The entire incident left a sour taste in the mouth of GAA fans, especially those of Galway and Dublin, of which a rivalry between the two was born. They did not meet in the competition again until the 2018 All-Ireland Senior Football Championship semi-final.

The match and related incidents was given the Scannal treatment by RTÉ in 2007.

Hazley auctioned his medal in 2013.
