= 2000 All-Ireland Senior Football Championship final =

- Event: 2000 All-Ireland Senior Football Championship
Kerry	Galway
0–14	0–14
- Date: 24 September 2000
- Venue: Croke Park, Dublin
- Man of the Match: Mike Frank Russell
- Referee: Pat McEnaney (Monaghan)
- Attendance: 63,349

2000 All-Ireland Senior Football Championship final replay
- Event: 2000 All-Ireland Senior Football Championship
Kerry	Galway
0–17 (17)	1–10 (13)
- Date: 7 October 2000
- Venue: Croke Park, Dublin
- Man of the Match: Seamus Moynihan
- Referee: Brian White (Wexford)
- Attendance: 64,094

The 2000 All-Ireland Senior Football Championship final was the 113th All-Ireland Final and the deciding match of the 2000 All-Ireland Senior Football Championship, an inter-county Gaelic football tournament for the top teams in Ireland.

Kerry defeated Galway after a replay. There was controversy over the decision to hold the replay on a Saturday, instead of the usual Sunday. Since then games on days other than Sundays have become commonplace. Kerry ultimately triumphed over Galway by a scoreline of 0–17 to 1–10.

== Match 1 ==
=== Summary ===
Kerry played Galway on Sunday (24 September 2000) in Croke Park, Dublin in the All-Ireland Senior Football Championship title. The two teams had previously played against one another in Croke Park in an All-Ireland Final in 1965 where Galway won, the 2000 final ended in a draw. Galway trailed for most of the game and it wasn't until three minutes from the end that they levelled the game after working tirelessly throughout to reduce the deficit. At one point Galway were behind Kerry by seven points in the first half of the game. The final score was 0–14 points each. It was the first time since the 1992 All-Ireland Final that both sides failed to score a goal.

Pádraic Joyce brought the sides level with four minutes remaining.

The referee played 40 seconds of additional time.

=== Details ===
24 September 2000
15:30 IST (UTC+1)

Kerry	0–14 – 0–14	Galway
Dara Ó Cinnéide 0–4, Mike Frank Russell 0–3, Liam Hassett 0–2, Noel Kennelly 0–2, Johnny Crowley 0–2, Darragh Ó Sé 0–1		Pádraic Joyce 0–6, Niall Finnegan 0–3, Derek Savage 0–2, Kevin Walsh 0–1, John Donnellan 0–1, Tommy Joyce 0–1

Croke Park, Dublin
Attendance: 63,349
Referee: Pat McEnaney (Monaghan)

Kerry	Galway

1	Declan O'Keeffe
2	Mike Hassett
3	Seamus Moynihan (c)
4	Mike McCarthy
5	Tomás Ó Sé
6	Éamonn Fitzmaurice
7	Tom O'Sullivan
8	Darragh Ó Sé
9	Donal Daly
10	Aodán Mac Gearailt
11	Dara Ó Cinnéide
12	Noel Kennelly	Substituted off
13	Mike Frank Russell
14	Liam Hassett
15	Johnny Crowley	Substituted off
Substitutes:
16	Peter O'Leary
17	Maurice Fitzgerald	Substituted on
18	Denis O'Dwyer	Substituted on
19	Killian Burns
20	Tommy Griffin
21	Enda Galvin
22	Mossie Lyons
23	Kenneth Dillon
24	Stephen O'Sullivan
Manager:
Páidí Ó Sé

1	Martin McNamara
2	Tomás Meehan
3	Gary Fahey
4	Ray Silke	Substituted off
5	Declan Meehan
6	John Divilly
7	Seán Óg de Paor
8	Seán Ó Domhnaill
9	Joe Bergin	Substituted off
10	Paul Clancy
11	Tommy Joyce	Substituted off
12	Michael Donnellan
13	Derek Savage
14	Pádraic Joyce (c)
15	Niall Finnegan
Substitutes:
16	Pádraig Lally
17	Richie Fahey	Substituted on
18	Jason Killeen
19	Kevin Walsh	Substituted on
20	Michael Colleran
21	Shay Walsh
22	John Donnellan	Substituted on
23	Kieran Comer
24	Lorcan Colleran
Manager:
John O'Mahony

== Match 2 ==
=== Summary ===
The replay of the 2000 All-Ireland Senior Football Final took place in Croke Park on Saturday, 7 October at 4:00pm. It was the first time since 1996 that the decider went to a replay. It wasn't the disjointed game of the 24th, that was replayed on the hallowed turf of Croke Park amidst the chants and jeers of the 64,000 strong crowd, rather a close, man-marked, point-for-point contest, that the pundits had predicted preceding the first game. The first half was a paradox of brilliant football and wide shooting. Declan Meehan broke through Kerry's defense, in the 6th minute, to score one of the best goals of the championship. Galway's one point lead boded ominous for Kerry but they rallied and began to pick their points amidst a shower of wides. The most definitive injury of the half was that of Kevin Walsh who had to be replaced by Joe Bergin. Kerry began to exert dominance in the middle of the field especially after Maurice Fitzgerald replaced Noel Kennelly in the 27th minute and played as a third midfielder. As the team broke for half-time the score was 0–09 to 1–04 in favour of Kerry. A light drizzle fell in the second half. Fitzgerald settled into his position with the professional role familiar to all from the 97 season. Kevin Walsh was re-introduced for mid-fielder Sean O'Domhnaill to combat Fitzgearld's influence but he never played as dominant a part in the game as he had prior to his earlier injury and indeed the drawn game. The deteriorating pitch surface took its toll as players began to slip and slide along the Cusack sideline but with minutes left to play Kerry had opened their lead to 4 points and it stayed that way at the end.

Aodán Mac Gearailt fisted the insurance point over the bar in the 2000 replay.

=== Details ===
7 October 2000
15:30 IST (UTC+1)

Kerry	0–17 – 1–13	Galway
Dara Ó Cinnéide 0–4, Johnny Crowley 0–3, Aodán Mac Gearailt 0–3, Liam Hassett 0–3, Mike Frank Russell 0–2, Maurice Fitzgerald 0–1, Éamonn Fitzmaurice 0–1		Declan Meehan 1–0, Michael Donnellan 0–2, Niall Finnegan 0–2, Tommy Joyce 0–1, Pádraic Joyce 0–1, Joe Bergin 0–1, Seán Óg de Paor 0–1, Kevin Walsh 0–1, Shay Walsh 0–1

Croke Park, Dublin
Attendance: 64,094
Referee: Brian White (Wexford)

Kerry	Galway

1	Declan O'Keeffe
2	Mike Hassett
3	Seamus Moynihan (c)
4	Mike McCarthy
5	Tomás Ó Sé
6	Éamonn Fitzmaurice
7	Tom O'Sullivan	Substituted off
8	Darragh Ó Sé
9	Donal Daly
10	Aodán Mac Gearailt
11	Dara Ó Cinnéide
12	Noel Kennelly	Substituted off
13	Mike Frank Russell
14	Liam Hassett
15	Johnny Crowley
Substitutes:
16	Peter O'Leary
17	Maurice Fitzgerald	Substituted on
18	Denis O'Dwyer
19	Killian Burns
20	Tommy Griffin	Substituted on
21	Enda Galvin
22	Mossie Lyons
23	Kenneth Dillon
24	Stephen O'Sullivan
Manager:
Páidí Ó Sé

1	Martin McNamara
2	Tomás Meehan
3	Gary Fahey
4	Richie Fahey
5	Declan Meehan
6	John Divilly
7	Seán Óg de Paor
8	Kevin Walsh	Substituted off	Substituted on
9	Seán Ó Domhnaill	Substituted off
10	Tommy Joyce	Substituted off
11	Pádraic Joyce (c)
12	Michael Donnellan
13	Derek Savage
14	Paul Clancy	Substituted off
15	Niall Finnegan
Substitutes:
16	Pádraig Lally
17	Ray Silke
18	Jason Killeen
19	Joe Bergin	Substituted on
20	Michael Colleran
21	Shay Walsh	Substituted on
22	John Donnellan	Substituted on
23	Kieran Comer
24	Lorcan Colleran
Manager:
John O'Mahony
