= 1914 Fitzgibbon Cup =

Irish collegiate hurling tournament

- Dates: 20–22 February 1914
- Teams: 3
- Champions: University College Cork (2nd title)
- Runners-up: University College Dublin

Tournament statistics
- Matches played: 3

The 1914 Fitzgibbon Cup was the third staging of the Fitzgibbon Cup since its establishment by the Gaelic Athletic Association in 1912. University College Cork hosted the cup from 20 February to 22 February 1914.

University College Cork were the defending champions.

On 22 February 1914, University College Cork won the Fitzgibbon Cup after topping the group with four points after recording two wins. University College Dublin were runners-up.
