= Peter Lee =

Peter or Pete Lee may refer to:

== Religion ==
- Peter Lee (bishop of Virginia) (1938–2022), American bishop of the Episcopal Church
- Peter Lee (bishop of Christ the King) (born 1947), England-born Anglican bishop, working in South Africa
- Peter Kyongho Lee (born 1958/1959), South Korean Anglican bishop

== Science and medicine ==
- Peter Lee Jung-sum (1939–2008), Hong Kong meteorologist, elder brother of Bruce Lee
- Peter Lee (engineer) (born 1954), Australian engineer and academic
- Peter Lee (computer scientist) (born 1960), American computer scientist, former head of Microsoft Research

== Sports and games ==
- Peter Lee (chess player) (born 1943), English chess player
- Peter Lee (cricketer) (1945–2026), English cricketer
- Peter Lee (Gaelic footballer) (born 1955), Irish Gaelic footballer
- Peter Lee (ice hockey) (born 1956), English-Canadian ice hockey player and manager

== Others ==
- Peter P. Lee (1861–1937), American politician
- Peter Lee (trade unionist) (1864–1935), English mine union leader
- Pete Lee (born 1947), American politician, Colorado state legislator
- Peter Lee Ka-kit (born 1963), Hong Kong businessman
- Peter Lee (musician) (born 1966), Singaporean musician, composer, and record producer
- Peter Lee (director), Chinese film director

== See also ==
- Peterlee, County Durham, England
- Peter Li (disambiguation)
- Peter Leigh (1939–2024), footballer
- Empire River, a ship later renamed Peter Leigh
