= Joe Bergin =

Joe Bergin may refer to:

- Joe Bergin (Gaelic footballer) (born 1981), Gaelic footballer from County Galway, Ireland
- Joe Bergin (hurler) (born 1988), Irish sportsperson from County Offaly
