= 1913 Fitzgibbon Cup =

Irish collegiate hurling tournament

- Dates: 11–13 April 1913
- Teams: 3
- Champions: University College Cork (1st title); Peter M. Murphy (captain)
- Runners-up: University College Dublin; John Ryan (captain)

Tournament statistics
- Matches played: 3
- Goals scored: 14 (4.67 per match)
- Points scored: 3 (1 per match)

The 1913 Fitzgibbon Cup was the second staging of the Fitzgibbon Cup since its establishment by the Gaelic Athletic Association in 1912. University College Galway hosted the cup from 11 April to 13 April 1913.

University College Dublin were the defending champions.

On 13 April 1913, University College Cork won the Fitzgibbon Cup after topping the group with four points after recording two wins. University College Dublin were runners-up.

== Statistics ==
=== Group table ===
Team	Matches				Score			Pts
Team	Pld	W	D	L	For	Against	Diff	Pts
University College Cork	2	2	0	0	11-02	1-00	+32	4
University College Dublin	2	1	0	1	3-01	5-01	-6	2
University College Galway	2	0	0	2	0-00	8-02	-26	0

=== Group results ===
11 April 1913 Round 1	University College Cork	6-01 - 0-00	University College Galway

12 April 1913 Round 2	University College Dublin	2-01 - 0-00	University College Galway

13 April 1913 Round 3	University College Cork	5-01 - 1-00	University College Dublin
