= Matthew Clancy =

Irish Gaelic football player

Personal information
- Native name: Maitiú Mac Fhlannchaidh (Irish)
- Born: 16 May 1982 (age 44) Galway, Ireland
- Occupation: Engineer
- Height: 1.81 m (5 ft 11 in)

Sport
- Sport: Gaelic football
- Position: Right half forward
Clubs
- Years: Club
- 1999–2012 2013–2017: Oughterard; Cuala
College
- Years: College
- NUI Galway
College titles
- Sigerson titles: 1
Inter-county
- Years: County
- 2001–2012: Galway
Inter-county titles
- Connacht titles: 4
- All-Irelands: 1
- NFL: 0
- All Stars: 0

Matthew Clancy is a former Gaelic footballer who played for Galway. He won All-Ireland medals at under-21 and senior level. He plays his club football with Oughterard in Galway.

Clancy won the 2003 Sigerson Cup while playing for NUI Galway.

== Career ==
=== College ===
Clancy played for NUI Galway and the team won the 2003 Sigerson Cup.

=== Inter-county ===
Clancy began his inter-county career in 2001. After a poor start in the Championship, Galway regrouped to progress through the qualifiers in style and get revenge over Roscommon in the quarter-final. In the semi-final, Galway were second best to Derry for large periods of the game and in the 55th minute, the score was 1–10 to 0–08 in favour of Derry. However, a revival led by Derek Savage saw Galway fight back and in the 66th minute, Matthew struck the haymaker for Derry's chances of victory. He was on the field for just over ten minutes as Bergin's replacement. Declan Meehan and Michael Donnellan wove their way up the right flank, before releasing Savage. He jinked this way and that, creating enough space to allow room for the pass. Clancy drifted unmarked into the space in front of Eoin McCloskey's goal to take it, turned and fired high past the ’keeper. A couple more scores, from a Pádraic Joyce free and Paul Clancy, made certain the victory and Galway qualified for the All-Ireland final with a 3-point victory, 1–14 to 1–11. Galway went on to win the All-Ireland final that year, outclassing a Meath side who had destroyed reigning champions Kerry in the other semi-final. The final score was 0–17 to 0-08.

Clancy was also part of Galway's Under-21 All-Ireland success in 2002, defeating Dublin by 0–15 to 0-07. Over the next few years, he progressed form his super-sub role into a first choice pick for the Galway set-up, combining his progress with his university studies at Galway. Clancy won 4 Connacht titles, these came in 2002, 2003, 2005 and 2008.

After a few lean years during Peter Forde's time in charge, Galway recovered under a newly appointed manager, Liam Sammon, to become a potential tip for the Sam Maguire Cup. Clancy became an influential presence in the Galway forward line alongside Pádraic Joyce and Michael Meehan. He was named Man Of The Match for his performance against Roscommon in the Connacht SFC 1st round in May 2008. He won his fourth Connacht title against Mayo on 13 July and earned a place in the quarter-finals as a result. In the build-up to the quarter-final clash against Kerry, Clancy struggled with injury and despite starting the match, he was taken off midway through the first-half. He came back on in the second half but Kerry ran out 1–21 to 1-16 winners over Galway. He scored 1–05 in the 2008 Championship.

In 2012, Clancy announced his retirement from inter-county football.
