= Peter Li =

Peter Li may be:

- Peter Li Hongye (1920–2011), Chinese Roman Catholic bishop
- Peter Li (mathematician) (born 1952), mathematician at University of California, Irvine
- Zhi Cong Li (born 1993), Chinese racing driver

== See also ==
- Peter Lee (disambiguation)
