= Killererin GAA =

Gaelic football club in County Galway, Ireland

Killererin
- Cill Fhir Iarainn
- Founded: 1889
- County: Galway
- Colours: White and Red
- Grounds: Killererin GAA Grounds/Barna Déarg
- Coordinates: 53.482°N 8.722°W

Playing kits
Standard colours

Senior Club Championships
| | All Ireland | Connacht champions | Galway champions |
|---|---|---|---|
| Football: | - | 2 | 6 |

Killererin (Irish: Cill Fhir Iarainn) is a Gaelic football club based in the Tuam area in County Galway, Ireland. It is a member of the Galway GAA branch of the Gaelic Athletic Association. An exclusively football club, Killererin fields underage teams up to U-16s play in the Galway league and championships.

== History ==
Founded in 1889, the club was originally named Killererin John Dillon's. Competing for much of the 20th century in the junior grade, the club won its first county junior championship title in 1968. Promoted to senior grade, the club won the Galway Senior Football Championship in 1976.

The club went on to win several club titles, and won its sixth county title defeating Corofin in October 2010. They faced St Brigid's of Roscommon in the 2010 Connacht Senior Club Football Championship final, but were beaten in extra time.

Several Killererin players have played for Galway inter-county teams. Billy Joyce represented Galway in the 1970s and early 1980s, and Pádraic Joyce helped Galway win the 1998 All-Ireland Senior Football Championship final, scoring a goal against Kildare. In 2001, Pádraic Joyce was joined on the Galway team by his brother Tommy Joyce, and together they helped Galway win the 2001 All-Ireland Senior Football Championship final. Pádraic Joyce was named "Footballer of the Year" in 2001. In 2007, Nicky (Nicholas) Joyce was the only Galway player to receive an All Star nomination for the 2007 All-Ireland Senior Football Championship.

Pádraic Joyce made his senior debut at the age of 15 in 1992. His father Paddy was part of the club's team that secured promotion from the Galway Junior Football Championship (JFC) to the Galway Senior Football Championship (SFC) in 1968. His uncle Billy was part of the 1970s teams that won the club's first Galway SFC titles. Pádraic Joyce, along with his brother Tommie and cousin Nicholas (Billy Joyce's son) all played critical parts in Killererin's late twentieth-century revival. The club spent 21 years without a Galway SFC until 1999, when it defeated An Cheathrú Rua later adding three more Galway SFCs in 2004, 2007 and 2010, each of which Joyce was part.

== Honours ==
- Galway Senior Football Championships (6): 1976, 1978, 1999, 2004, 2007, 2010 (runners-up in 2001, 2003)
- Connacht Senior Club Football Championship (2): 1976, 1978 (runners-up in 2004, 2010)

== Notable players ==
- Colin Forde
- Nicky Joyce
- Pádraic Joyce

| Preceded by Fr. Griffins | Galway Senior Football Championship winning team 1976 | Succeeded by Corofin |
| Preceded by Roscommon Gaels | Connacht Senior Club Football Championship winning team 1976 | Succeeded by St Mary's |
| Preceded by Corofin | Galway Senior Football Championship winning team 1978 | Succeeded by St Grellan's |
| Preceded by St Mary's | Connacht Senior Club Football Championship winning team 1978 | Succeeded by St Grellan's |
| Preceded by Corofin | Galway Senior Football Championship winning team 1999 | Succeeded by Corofin |
| Preceded by Caltra | Galway Senior Football Championship winning team 2004 | Succeeded by Salthill-Knocknacarra |
| Preceded by Corofin | Galway Senior Football Championship winning team 2007 | Succeeded by Corofin |
| Preceded by Corofin | Galway Senior Football Championship winning team 2010 | Succeeded by Corofin |
