= John Gough (referee) =

Gaelic football referee

Personal information
- Born: 1937 (age 88–89)
- Years active: c. 1980s–1997
- Employer: GAA

Sport
- Sport: Gaelic football
- Position: Referee
- Club: St John's

John Gough (born 1937) is a former Gaelic football referee, who also officiated at hurling matches. He is a member of the St John's club in County Antrim.

== Career ==
Gough took charge of the 1983 All-Ireland Senior Football Championship Final, contested by Dublin and Galway. The Irish Times reported afterwards:

The referee, John Gough, found himself in a horrid situation, and though he brought his authority to bear on some of the worst incidents of misconduct many of his decisions were mystifying and brought the ire of both sides down upon his head.

Four players were sent to the line, the largest exodus in a final in recent times: three were dismissed between Galway and Kerry in 1965, two of them Kerry players.

Gough gave pre-match interviews commenting on the competing teams, which prompted Croke Park to issue guidance ahead of the 1984 season discouraging referees from making similar remarks, on the basis that they could give rise to perceptions of bias.

Gough refereed the All-Ireland Under-21 Football Championship final in 1985, as well as finals of the Ulster Senior Football Championship, the National Football League, and the Sigerson Cup. He also served as a linesman at several All-Ireland finals in both football and hurling.

Gough was 45 when he took charge of the 1983 final, and retired from refereeing in 1997 at the age of 60, going on to serve as a national tutor and assessor of referees.
