= Gareth Bradshaw =

Irish Gaelic football player

Personal information
- Native name: Gearóid Bradseach (Irish)
- Born: 13 February 1987 (age 39) Galway, Ireland
- Occupation: Safety Engineer
- Height: 1.85 m (6 ft 1 in)

Sport
- Sport: Gaelic Football
- Position: Right half back
Club
- Years: Club
- 2004–: Moycullen
Club titles
- Galway titles: 2
- Connacht titles: 1
- All-Ireland Titles: 1
College
- Years: College
- University of Galway
Inter-county*
Years	County	Apps (scores)
2007–2020	Galway	46 (0-19)
Inter-county titles
- Connacht titles: 3
- NFL: 1
- *Inter County team apps and scores correct as of 15 November 2020.

Gareth Bradshaw (born 13 February 1987) is a Gaelic footballer from Galway, Ireland who played from 2007 to 2021.

Bradshaw played club football for Moycullen. In 2007, he made his senior debut in the NFL, winning three Connacht titles that year.

In 2008, he played in his first GAA Championship game in the opening round of the Connacht SFC against Roscommon.

In 2013, Bradshaw acted as vice-captain to manager Alan Mulholland.

Bradshaw has also played for University of Galway (NUIG). In 2020, his NUIG team claimed their first ever County Senior Football title, beating Mountbellew-Moylough in the final.

In 2021, Bradshow confirmed his retirement, following 14 years with the Galway footballers. He was the longest serving member of the panel at the time.
