= Skellig Rangers GAA =

Gaelic games club in County Kerry, Ireland

Skellig Rangers
- Founded: 1895
- County: Kerry
- Colours: Green and Yellow
- Grounds: Páirc Chill Imeallach, Portmagee

Playing kits
Standard colours

Skellig Rangers are a Gaelic Athletic Association club from Portmagee, County Kerry. They play in Kerry Junior Football Championship, Division 4 of the Kerry County League as well as the South Kerry Senior Football Championship and South Kerry Leagues. It was founded in 1895 as Portmagee GAA, and changed to its current name in the 1930s.

== Achievements ==
- South Kerry Senior Football Championships 3: 1946, 1968, 2006
- Kerry Junior Football Championships 1: 2008
- Munster Junior Club Football Championships 1: 2008
- All-Ireland Junior Club Football Championships 1: 2009
- South Kerry Minor Championship: 2022

== Notable players ==
- Stephen O'Sullivan All-Ireland Senior Football Championship winner.
