= Corofin GAA (Galway) =

Gaelic football club in County Galway, Ireland

Corofin
- Corafinne
- Founded: 1925
- County: Galway
- Colours: Yellow And Green
- Grounds: Corofin GAA Grounds
- Coordinates: 53°26′11.89″N 8°51′32.40″W

Playing kits
Standard colours

Senior Club Championships
	All Ireland	Connacht champions	Galway champions
Football:	5	10	23

Corofin GAA is a Gaelic football club based in Corofin, County Galway, Ireland. It is a member of the Galway branch of the Gaelic Athletic Association (GAA). The club serves the two parishes of Cummer and Kilmoylan and the village of Belclare.

Corofin are the 2019–20 All-Ireland Club Champions, after winning their third-successive All-Ireland Senior Club Football Championship final by defeating Kilcoo of Down in January 2020.

== History ==
The club has had a long association with the GAA dating back as far as its inception. Corofin born and long time local parish priest, Dr Patrick Duggan, who was then Bishop of Clonfert was Michael Cusack's first choice to be the clerical patron of the new association in 1884. However, the Bishop (then 71 years of age) declined the invitation on health grounds, and directed the delegation to the more youthful Dr Croke the Archbishop of Cashel.

The current club was formed in 1925 as a result of an amalgamation between Corofin and Belclare. With the disruption of war and emigration in the first two decades of the 20th century, it was increasingly difficult for the two rural clubs to be competitive against the town teams. The name of the new club was decided when Corofin (captained by Tom Molloy) defeated Belclare (captained by Hubert McHugh) in a game in Anbally on Easter Sunday, 12 April 1925.

It was also in 1925 that Tom Molloy became the first man from the parish to win an All-Ireland senior football medal. Molloy went on to train Galway to win the 1934 All-Ireland Senior Football Championship final and the Roscommon team in the 1940s to All-Ireland successes.

== Later years ==
Of the club's 21 Galway Senior Football Championship title wins, 18 of these have been since 1991. The club has also won 10 Connacht Senior Club Football Championship titles. In 1998, 2015, 2018 2019 and 2020 the club won the All-Ireland Senior Club Football Championship.

Corofin won the 2019 Galway Senior Football Championship, defeating Tuam Stars in a replay on a scoreline of 11 points to 8 points. This win allowed the club to become the third club to win seven Galway senior football championship titles in a row (2013–2019).

In 2019, the club won their second successive All-Ireland Senior Club Football Championship, defeating Dr Crokes in the 2018–19 All-Ireland Club Championship final on a scoreline of 2-16 to 10 points.

In 2020, Corofin became the first GAA club team (in either hurling or football) to win three back-to-back All-Ireland club titles, beating Kilcoo after extra-time in the 2019–20 final.

Later that year, Mountbellew–Moylough defeated Corofin in the county semi-final at Pearse Stadium, the club's first Galway SFC loss in 49 games going back to 2012.

== Titles ==
- All-Ireland Senior Club Football Championship (5): 1998, 2015, 2018, 2019, 2020
- Galway Senior Football Championship (23): 1932, 1946, 1977, 1991, 1993, 1995, 1997, 1998, 2000, 2002, 2006, 2008, 2009, 2011, 2013, 2014, 2015, 2016, 2017, 2018, 2019, 2023, 2024
- Connacht Senior Club Football Championship (10): 1991, 1995, 1997, 2008, 2009, 2014, 2016, 2017, 2018, 2019
- Galway Minor Football Championship (12): 1962, 1992, 1993, 1994, 1995, 1996, 1997, 1998, 1999, 2003, 2008, 2010, 2012

== Notable players ==
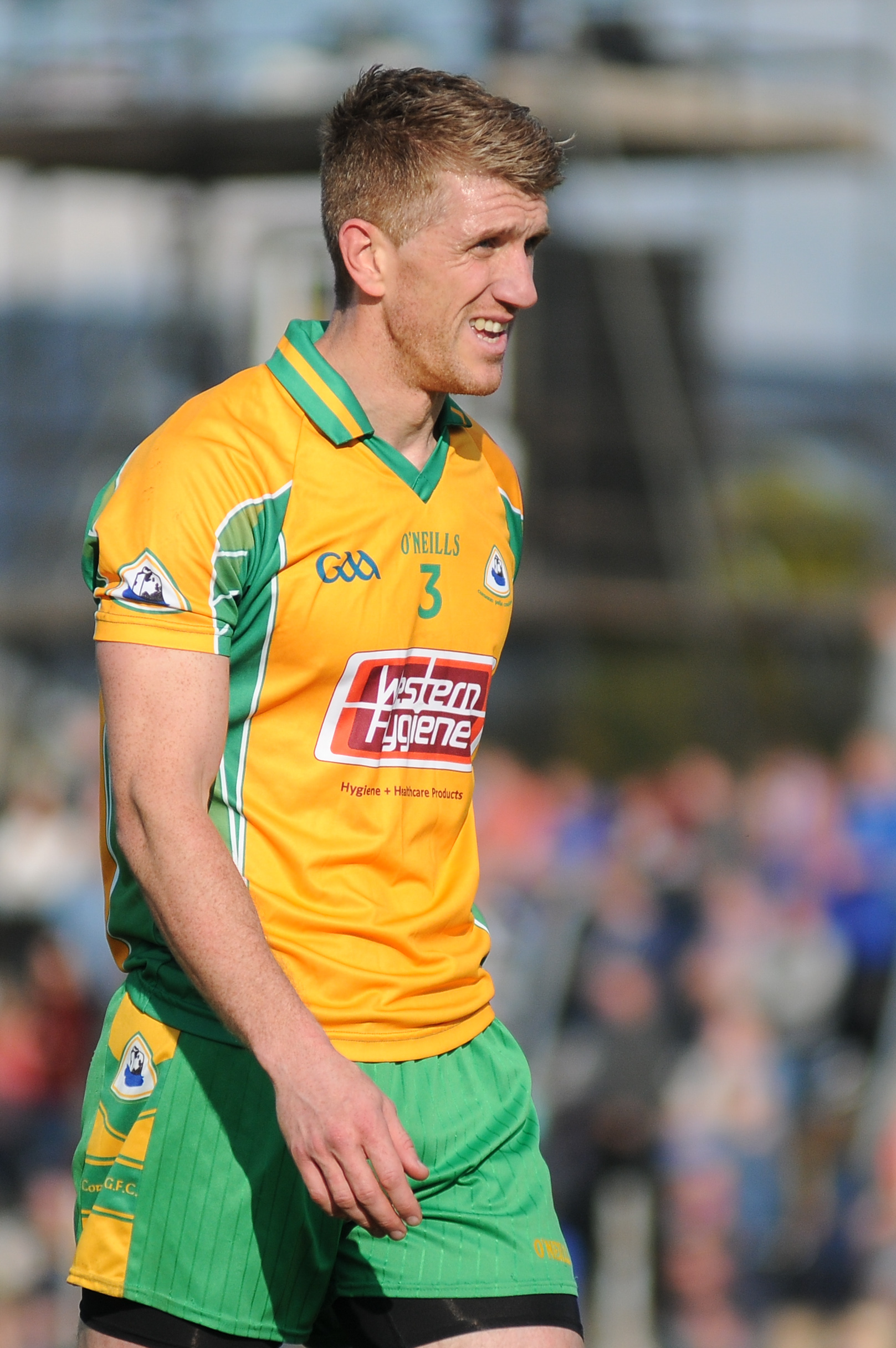
Kieran Fitzgerald in 2015

- Damien Burke
- Ciaran Whiteside (Under 12 Player’s Player of the Year 2016)
- Daithí Burke (All Ireland winner in 2017 with Galway Hurlers)
- Ian Burke
- Jimmy Duggan
- Kieran Fitzgerald
- Paul McGettigan
- Ciarán McGrath
- Martin McNamara
- Kieran Molloy (played for Corofin then NUI Galway in the Sigerson Cup on the same day in February 2018)
- Gary Sice
- Liam Silke (won an All Star in 2022)
- Ray Silke (Galway and Corofin All Ireland captain in 1998 double win)
