= Milltown GAA (Galway) =

Gaelic football club in County Galway, Ireland

Milltown
- Baile an Mhuilinn
- Founded: 1953
- County: Galway
- Nickname: The Scans
- Colours: Blue And White
- Grounds: Fr. Conroy Park
- Coordinates: 53°37′N 8°54′W

Playing kits
Standard colours

Senior Club Championships
	All Ireland	Connacht champions	Galway champions
Football:	-	-	2

Milltown (Irish: Baile an Mhuilinn) is a Gaelic football club based in the Milltown area of County Galway. It is a member of the Galway GAA branch of the Gaelic Athletic Association. Established in 1953, the club is one of the longest Galway sides still in existence. Milltown is concerned exclusively with the sport of football.

Twice winners of the Galway Senior Football Championship, Milltown made a first appearance in a county final in 20 years in 2007, but lost to Killererin at Pearse Stadium in Salthill.

Former Texaco Footballer of the Year, Noel Tierney, one of the members of Galway's historic "Three In a Row" team, would be one of Milltown's best known players.

Milltown is the second longest senior football team in Galway after Tuam Stars.

== History ==
The oldest record of a Milltown GAA Club dates back as far as 1888 when Milltown John O'Keanes (named after a local man who was forced to leave his native country on a Fenian emigrant ship in the late 1860s) played Dunmore McHales on 6 April, defeating them 0-4 to 0-1.

By 1901 there was a new club in existence, Milltown Erin's Hope. In a report of a match played on 17 August the Milltown side beat Tuam Emeralds 2-3 to 2-0. It also says that an unnamed Milltown captain called for the Harp for Erin as the referee conducted the toss-up leading to the newly named club.

It wasn't until 1953 that the club was re-established, originally called Milltown St. Malachy's. The first team to represent the newly founded club was a junior side that played Kilconly on 12 April 1953, however Kilconly won the game 2-3 to 0-3. On 17 May however, in their second match, they defeated Cortoon Shamrocks in a league game 3-6 to 0-3 at Brownesgrove.

In 1953 they won their first trophy when they beat Ahascragh 1-7 to 2-1 in the Galway Junior North Board Championship Final Replay, drawing the first match with seven points each, however they were stripped of their title and suspended for 12 months for fielding an illegal player, a County Longford man who worked as a barman in a pub in Vicar Street, Tuam.

It wasn't until 1961 that Milltown won their first Galway Junior County Championship making history having to win it twice. After winning the North Board final they went straight through to the County final defeating St. Grellan's, Ballinasloe by 6-8 to 1-2. They didn't play a semi-final as the opposition, Clonbur weren't able to field a team but after an objection, they were given a refixture which Milltown won by 0-10 to 0-2 on New Years Day 1962. This became the first GAA result to be announced on the new RTÉ television channel which was opened that same day.

Ten years later in 1971, they won their first Galway Senior Football Championship with only a panel of 17 men. They defeated Ballinasloe on a scoreline of 0-4 to 0-5 on 10 October in Tuam Stadium, led by captain Sean Brennan. Milltown would go on to reach the Connacht Senior Club Football Championship final that year, however; they were defeated by Claremorris.

A decade later, they won their second and last Senior County Championship, again beating Ballinasloe, with a scoreline of 0-11 to 2-3 on 22 November 1981 in Tuam Stadium. John Hehir captained the winning team.

Two Milltown players were part of the Galway Under 21 All-Ireland winning squad in 2002: Diarmaid Blake and John Devane. Three more Milltown players were part of the Galway Under 21 All-Ireland winning squad in 2005: Darren Mullahy, Matthew Flannery and Cathal Blake. In 2011, Mark Hehir won an All-Ireland medal as part of the victorious Galway Under 21 squad.

In 2007, Milltown qualified for a Galway SFC final for the first time in twenty years. Killererin won the game by two points.

In 2008, the club was awarded a Special Achievement Award by Galway county board for its underage program.

== Notable players ==
- Diarmaid Blake (4-time Connacht Senior Football Champion with Galway)
- Pádraig Coyne (2-time Connacht Senior Football Champion with Galway)
- Gay McManus (5-time Connacht Senior Football Champion and 1 National League with Galway)
- Noel Tierney (3-time All Ireland Football Champion with Galway)
- Tomás Tierney (5-time Connacht Senior Football Champion with Galway)
- Joe Waldron (2-time Connacht Senior Football Champion with Galway)

== Honours ==
=== Men's football ===
- Galway Senior Football Championship (2): 1971, 1981
- Connacht Senior Club Football Championship (0): (runners-up in 1971)
- Galway Senior Football League: Division 1 (6): 1975, 1986, 1992, 2011, 2012, 2013
- Galway North Board Under-21 'A' Football Championship (3): 1990, 1991, 1992
- Galway County Under-21 'A' Football Championship (3): 1990, 1991, 1992
- Galway North Board Minor 'A' Football Championship (2): 1954, 1960

=== Ladies football ===
- Intermediate All-Ireland Club 7-A-Side Shield (2): 2010, 2014
- All-Ireland Club 7-A-Side Junior Championship (3): 2006, 2007, 2022
