= Joe Bergin (Gaelic footballer) =

Galway Gaelic footballer

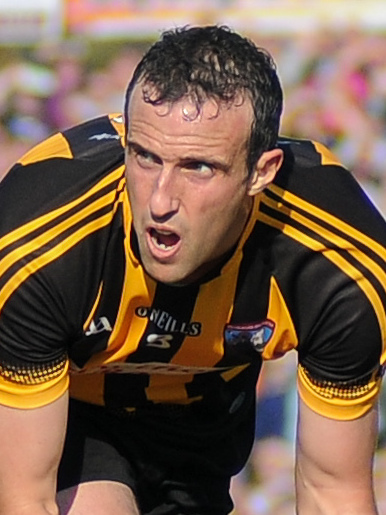
- Bergin with Mountbellew–Moylough in 2015

Personal information
- Native name: Seosamh Ó Beirgin (Irish)
- Born: 17 February 1981 (age 45) Galway, Ireland
- Occupation: Investment Manager
- Height: 1.93 m (6 ft 4 in)

Sport
- Sport: Gaelic football
- Position: Midfield
Club
- Years: Club
- 1999–2017: Mountbellew–Moylough
Inter-county
- Years: County
- 2000–2012: Galway
Inter-county titles
- Connacht titles: 5
- All-Irelands: 1

Joe Bergin (born 17 February 1981) is an Irish former Gaelic footballer who played at senior level for the Galway county team from 2000 to 2012. From Galway, he played his club football with Mountbellew–Moylough.

In 2026, it was announced that Bergin would takeover from Alan Merriman as Chief Executive of Investment firm Elkstone having formerly been Head of Private Clients.

== Playing career ==
Bergin's rise at a young age was meteoric. He burst onto the scene in 2000 as part of a Galway side that reached that year's All-Ireland Senior Football Championship final; losing to Kerry after a replay.

A regular in the team during that campaign as a replacement for the injured Kevin Walsh, Bergin made a quick impression. Standing at 6"4, he has height but he also showed that he possessed good football skills and had a penchant for kicking valuable points.

At this time, Bergin was a key member of the Galway Under-21 team and his impressive performances for the Under-21s as they secured a Connacht title showed the Senior Management team that he deserved a starting place in Galway's Championship campaign in their first game against New York. In the three games that followed, Sligo, Leitrim and Kildare, Bergin cemented his place as a regular in the side, despite his relative experience at the Senior inter-county level. That year culminated in an All-Ireland Final against Kerry. Unfortunately for Bergin and Galway, Kerry were triumphant in the replay. That year, he was named the All Stars Young Footballer of the Year.

The next year, Bergin was an assured starter but Galways campaign to go one better in 2001 came unstuck after an unexpected defeat to Roscommon in Tuam. Galway had to go through the newly introduced qualifiers to have any chance of All-Ireland glory. Their quest began to pick up momentum with victories over Wicklow, Armagh, and Cork. They exacted revenge over Roscommon in the quarter-finals with a 0-14 to 1-06 victory. A late comeback, inspired by Derek Savage, gave Galway a three-point victory over Derry in the semi-final. Galway were in their 3rd All-Ireland final in 4 years, and Bergin was an influential player on their way to the final, scoring 0-09 along the way. In the final against Meath, who had annihilated reigning champions Kerry in the other semi-final, Galway outclassed the Meath team in some style, winning by 9 points, 0-17 to 0-08. Bergin contributed with 2 points, making up for his disappointment the previous year when he did not start in the Replay against Kerry. He finished as Galways 2nd top scorer that year behind Pádraic Joyce

In 2002, Galway secured another Connacht title but lost to Kerry in the quarter-finals. However, redemption arrived on the Under-21 scene for Bergin. He captained the team on their way to a 0-15 to 0-08 victory over a much fancied Dublin side.

In recent years, Galway have failed to reach the same heights as their early millennium triumphs. They have failed to go past the quarter-final stage, losing to Donegal after a replay in 2003, and to Cork in 2005. Although Bergin is a key member of the Galway team, he has lacked a partnership in the midfield similar to the one he enjoyed with Seán Ó Domhnaill and Kevin Walsh at the start of his career. Injuries to Bergin have also dented Galway's progress in the Championship in recent years. During Peter Forde's time in charge, Galway reached 3 Connacht finals but won just one of those, against Mayo in 2005. In 2006 and 2007, Galway lost their first qualifier after both Connacht Final disappointments.

Although Liam Sammon has brought success and a positive outlook to Galway football since his appointment in September 2007, Bergin has seen much of it from the sideline. On 6 April 2008, Bergin suffered an Achilles tendon injury in a League game against Mayo. After he underwent surgery, it was expected he would be out for four months. So far, Bergin has missed the rest of the 2008 National League season and Galway's 3 games in the Championship, where they went on to win their first Connacht title in 3 years with a 2-12 to 1-14 victory over Mayo. It was reported that he had regained full fitness and could play some part in Galway's quarter-final clash against Kerry in August. Bergin won a place on the bench for the showdown and was introduced in the second half for Paul Conroy. Not long after his introduction, a long high ball from Pádraic Joyce dropped towards the Kerry goal and Bergin managed to fist it past Declan O'Sullivan to give Galway a two-point lead. However, they could not make their advantage count as Kerry ran out 1-21 to 1-16 winners at the final whistle. Bergin is also a nephew of former Tipperary hurling captains Jack and Liam Bergin, and a cousin to former Meath footballer Paul Shankey In October 2012 Bergin announced his retirement from Inter-County football after 12 years on the panel.

== Honours ==
Galway

- All-Ireland Senior Football Championship (1): 2001
- All-Ireland Under-21 Football Championship (1): 2002 (c)
- Connacht Senior Football Championship (5): 2000, 2002, 2003, 2005, 2008
- Connacht Under-21 Football Championship (2): 2000, 2002 (c)

Personal

- All Stars Young Footballer of the Year (1): 2000

Preceded by Damien Burke	Galway Senior Football Captain; 2010 - 2011	Succeeded by Finian Hanley
