= Stephen Joyce (Gaelic footballer) =

Irish Gaelic footballer and manager

Personal information
- Native name: Stíofán Seoige (Irish)
- Born: 4 July 1957 (age 69) Clonbur, County Galway, Ireland
- Occupation: Technician
- Height: 5 ft 7 in (170 cm)

Sport
- Sport: Gaelic Football
- Position: Left corner-forward
Club
- Years: Club
- Naomh Pádraig
Club titles
- Galway titles: 0
Inter-county*
Years	County	Apps (scores)
1978–1988	Galway	? (9–48)
Inter-county titles
- Connacht titles: 5
- All-Irelands: 0
- NFL: 0
- *Inter County team apps and scores correct as of 16:21, 9 November 2016.

Stephen Joyce (born 4 July 1957) is an Irish Gaelic football manager and former player who played as a left corner-forward for the Galway senior team. He is a former manager of the Galway minor team.

== Honours ==
=== Player ===
Galway

- Connacht Senior Football Championship (5): 1982, 1983, 1984, 1986, 1987

=== Selector ===
Galway

- All-Ireland Senior Football Championship (2): 1998, 2001
- Connacht Senior Football Championship (4): 1998, 2000, 2002, 2003

=== Manager ===
Naomh Pádraig, Clonbur

- All-Ireland Junior Club Football Championship (1): 2012
- Connacht Junior Club Football Championship (1): 2011
- Galway Junior Football Championship (1): 2011

Galway

- Connacht Minor Football Championship (2): 2015, 2016
