= Stephen O'Sullivan =

Irish Gaelic footballer

Sport
- Sport: Gaelic football
- Position: Full/half back
Club
- Years: Club
- 1990's-: Skellig Rangers
Club titles
- Kerry titles: 4
Inter-county
Years	County	Apps (scores)
2000-2001	Kerry	0 (0-00)
Inter-county titles
- Munster titles: 1
- All-Irelands: 1

Stephen O'Sullivan is a footballer from the Skellig Rangers club in South Kerry. He played with Kerry at all levels from the mid-1990s to the mid-2000s. He first played with the Kerry minor team that won the 1997 Munster Championship. He then moved on to the Under 21 side and won another Munster Championship in 1999 and played in the All Ireland final but was on the losing side to Westmeath. He moved on to the Kerry senior panel for the 2000 season, he didn't play in any games but won an All Ireland medal as a sub. He also played junior with Kerry and won Munster Championships in 2002 and 2003, he also played in the 2002 All Ireland final.

He has had a lot of success at club level with Skellig Rangers and South Kerry. He won 4 County Senior Championships with South Kerry, 3 in a row from 2004 to 2006 and again in 2009. With Skellig Rangers he won a South Kerry Championship title in 2006, the club's first since 1968. 2008 would become the greatest in Skellig Rangers history when they won the County & Munster Junior Championship with O'Sullivan a key to the success; the team continued their success into 2009 when they won the All Ireland title.
