= Jason Doherty =

Irish Gaelic footballer

Personal information
- Born: 21 November 1989 (age 36) Castlebar, Ireland

Sport
- Sport: Gaelic football
- Position: Centre/Wing Forward
Club
Years	Club	Apps (scores)
2006–	Burrishoole	6-41
College(s)
- Years: College
- NUI Galway; DIT
College titles
- Sigerson titles: 1
Inter-county
Years	County	Apps (scores)
2011–2023	Mayo	6-53
Inter-county titles
- Connacht titles: 3
- All-Irelands: 0
- NFL: 0
- All Stars: 0

Jason Doherty (born 21 November 1989) is a Gaelic footballer who plays for Burrishoole and, formerly, the Mayo county team. He started at centre forward in the 2012 All-Ireland Final which Mayo lost by 0–13 to 2–11 against Donegal.

He studied at NUI Galway and played for the university football team.

On 12 August 2023, Doherty announced his retirement from inter-county football after 12 years.

== Honours ==
- Connacht Senior Football Championship (5): 2011–2015
- Connacht Under-21 Football Championship (2): 2008–2009
- Sigerson Cup (1): 2013
- Mr Olympia (1): 2017
