= Alan Freeman (Gaelic footballer) =

Irish Gaelic footballer

Personal information
- Native name: Alan Mac an tSaoir (Irish)
- Born: Castlebar, Ireland
- Height: 1.86 m (6 ft 1 in)

Sport
- Sport: Gaelic football
- Position: Full Forward
Club
- Years: Club
- Aghamore
Inter-county
- Years: County
- 2010–2018: Mayo
Inter-county titles
- Connacht titles: 4
- All-Irelands: 0
- NFL: 0
- All Stars: 0

Alan Freeman (born 1987 or 1988) is a Gaelic footballer who has played for Aghamore GAA club and the Mayo senior county team.

He was first selected for Mayo in 2010. He came on as a substitute in the 2012 All-Ireland Senior Football Championship Final which Mayo lost by 0–13 to 2–11 against Donegal. In the 2013 All-Ireland final, Freeman started at full forward as Mayo lost by a point to Dublin. Having left the Mayo panel in 2017, he was reportedly included in the squad during the 2018 season.
