= Martin McNamara (Gaelic footballer) =

Galway Gaelic footballer

Personal information
- Native name: Máirtín Mac Con Mara (Irish)
- Born: 11 November 1966 (age 59) Galway, Ireland
- Height: 1.78 m (5 ft 10 in)

Sport
- Sport: Gaelic football
- Position: Goalkeeper
Club
- Years: Club
- 1985–2001: Corofin
Club titles
- Galway titles: 6
- Connacht titles: 3
- All-Ireland Titles: 1
Inter-county
- Years: County
- 1989–2000: Galway
Inter-county titles
- Connacht titles: 3
- All-Irelands: 1
- NFL: 0
- All Stars: 1

Martin McNamara (born 11 November 1966) is an Irish former Gaelic footballer from Corofin, County Galway, Ireland.

McNamara was the reliable servant in goal for the Galway county team for several years. It was the time when a Galway match wouldn't be a Galway match without a McNamara save of blinding quality. Unfortunately it was also the time of a barren spell for the Galway team. That barren spell seemed to turn around with a first Connacht title in 8 years in 1995 and a narrow semi-final defeat to Tyrone but Mayo seemed to halt any revival that Galway were planning when they reached the next two All-Ireland finals, both at Galway's expense in Connacht.

As the 98 championship approached, retirement from inter-county football was a serious prospect for McNamara. He considered such a thought after playing a key role in Corofin's All-Ireland Club Championship winning team of 1998 but decided to continue for the time being. It would be a decision he would never regret.

John O'Mahony had taken over the reins of Galway football from Val Daly in 97 and was to take Galway through their most successful period since the famous "Three In A Row" era. They defeated Mayo in the first round of the Connacht SFC and extended Leitrim a similar courtesy in the semi-final. In the final, they played Roscommon on 13 July in a rainy day at Tuam Stadium. McNamara made crucial saves throughout the game and Galway forced a replay with a late Niall Finnegan free. Galway won the replay after extra time by 1-17 to 0-17. They were a step above Derry in the semi-final and not even a late penalty could ruin the day as Galway won by 0-16 to 1-08. In the final, they met a Kildare side who had bet the 1995, 1996, and the 1997 All-Ireland champions in their road to Croke Park. Kildare frustrated Galway in the first half and led by 1-05 to 0-05. However, Galway turned thing around in the 2nd half to win their 8th All-Ireland title, 1-14 to 1-10. For McNamara it had completed a unique double of club and county All-Ireland success. McNamara was named in the Goalkeeper slot for the 1998 All-Stars, confirming his status as best Goalkeeper in the country that year.

Galway looked to repeat their success in 1999 but Mayo gained revenge for the defeat in 98 by defeating Galway in the Connacht final at Tuam. Soon after Galway’s defeat in the Connacht final, McNamara decided to call it a day, again, but decided to have one final crack at the title in 2000.

In 2000, Galway defeated New York, Sligo and Leitrim on their way to another Connacht title. In the semi-final, they faced Kildare with the 98 decider fresh in their minds but Galway finished strongly to qualify for another All-Ireland final. Galway met Kerry in the final and after a poor start, Galway had kept Kerry to six points for the final 50 minutes. However they were unable to strike the winning score and the final finished level, 0-14 each. In the replay, a wonderful goal by Declan Meehan was not enough as Kerry won by 0-17 to 1-10. McNamara finally decided to retire at the age of 34

In recent years, the goalkeeper berth left void by McNamara since his retirement has been filled by Alan Keane, Pádraig Lally, Brian O'Donoghue and Paul Doherty.
