= Brian Talty =

Irish Gaelic football player (born 1955)

- Talty in 1975

Personal information
- Native name: Brian Ó Tailtigh (Irish)
- Born: 12 May 1955 (age 71) Tuam, Galway, Ireland
- Occupation: Secondary school teacher
- Height: 6 ft 2 in (188 cm)

Sport
- Sport: Gaelic football
- Position: Midfield
Clubs
- Years: Club
- Tuam Stars; Parnells
Club titles
- All-Ireland Titles: 1
Inter-county
- Years: County
- 1975–1987: Galway
Inter-county titles
- Connacht titles: 6
- All-Irelands: 0
- NFL: 1
- All Stars: 0

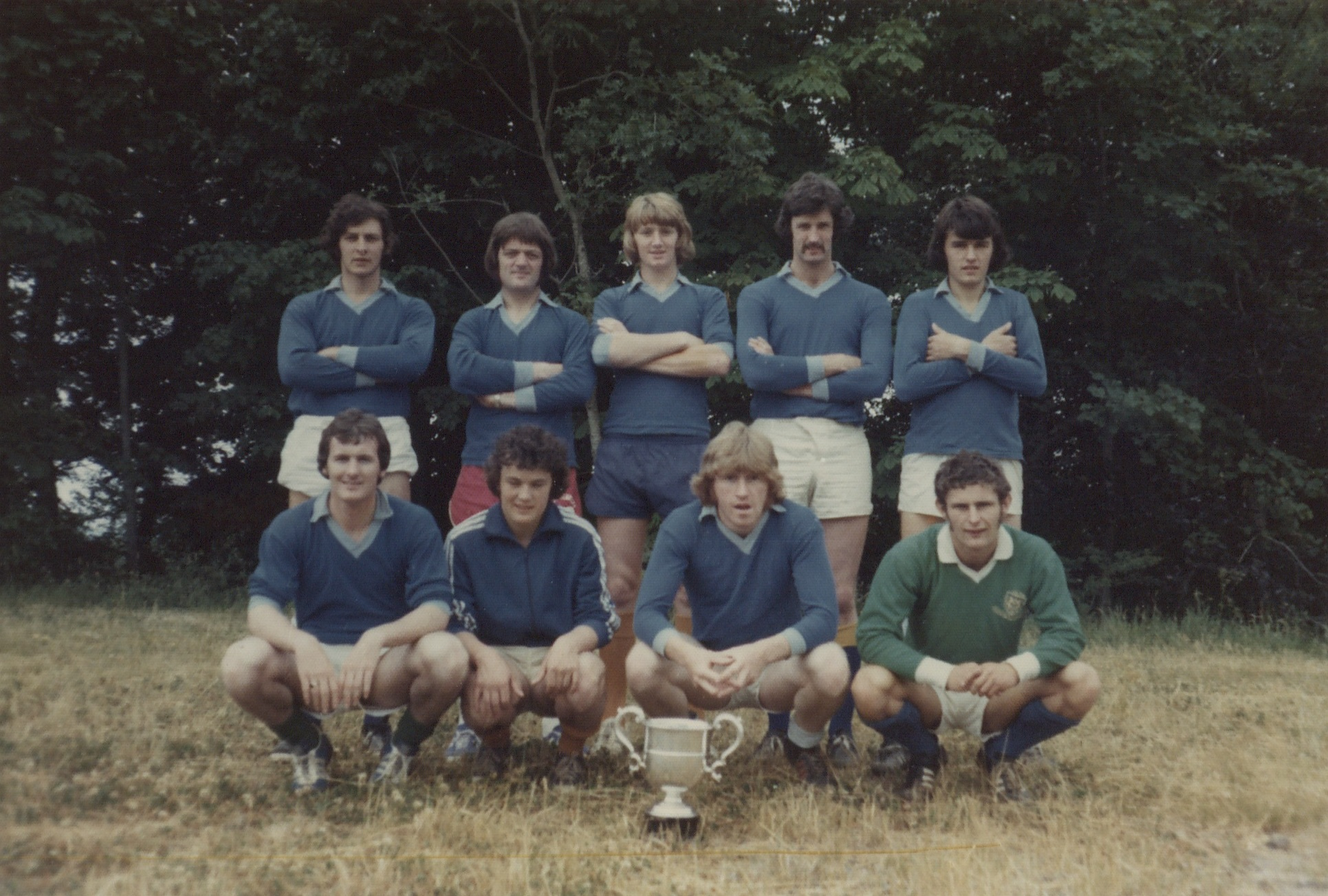
Talty in 1975 (back row, centre)

Brian Talty (born 12 May 1955) is a former Gaelic footballer who played at senior level for the Galway county team.

Talty was born in Tuam, County Galway, where he played Gaelic football with Tuam Stars. While training as a PE teacher at Thomond College in Limerick, he won an All-Ireland Club Football Championship as a star midfielder in a team that featured the Spillane brothers, Mick and Pat.

With Galway Talty won a National Football League medal in 1981. He played for Galway against Dublin in the 1983 All-Ireland Senior Football Championship Final, although injury forced his substitution in the second half of that game. Dublin won the final, despite finishing with twelve players. Galway finished with fourteen players.

Talty won two Dublin Senior Football Championship with Parnells in 1987 and 1988. In 1996 he managed St Sylvester's, Malahide, to their first, and so far only, Dublin Senior Football Championship. He managed Division 3 side Clanna Gael Fontenoy in 2010, before being appointed as Parnells senior football manager for the 2011 season. In 2010, Talty was appointed manager of Dublin GAA club Parnells. Talty has been a selector of the senior Dublin county team, working with the former Dublin manager Paul Caffrey and fellow selectors David Billings and Paul Clarke.

Talty is a secondary school teacher in County Dublin. There was speculation in Galway football circles that Brian would be nominated to fill the vacant Galway senior post in 2007 if Dublin lost to Kerry in the All-Ireland SFC semi-final. Although Dublin lost the game, Talty pledged his future to Dublin football.

He currently teaches Physical Education at St David's C.B.S. in Artane, Dublin.
