= Pádraic Joyce =

Galway Gaelic footballer and manager

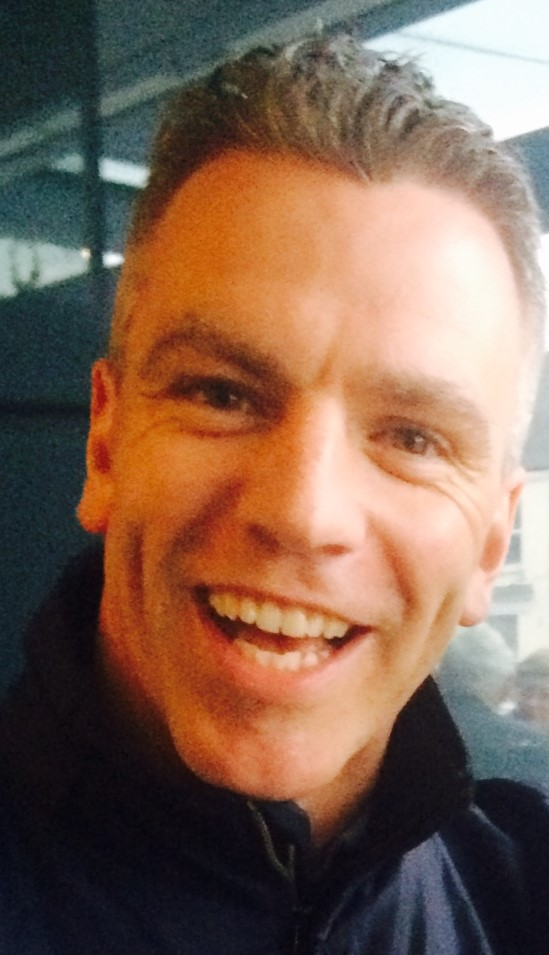
- Joyce in 2015

Personal information
- Native name: Pádraic Seoighe (Irish)
- Born: 1 April 1977 (age 49) Galway, Ireland
- Height: 1.83 m (6 ft 0 in)

Sport
- Sport: Gaelic football
- Position: Full forward
Club
- Years: Club
- 1992–2015: Killererin
Club titles
- Galway titles: 4
College
- Years: College
- IT Tralee
College titles
- Sigerson titles: 1
Inter-county
Years	County	Apps (scores)
1997–2012	Galway	66 (28–279)
Inter-county titles
- Connacht titles: 6
- All-Irelands: 2
- All Stars: 3
Inter-county management
- Years: Team
- 2019–2026: Galway
Inter-county titles as manager
County	League	Province	All-Ireland
Galway		1	1

Pádraic Joyce (born 1 April 1977) is a former Gaelic football manager and former player who played as a forward. He managed the senior Galway county team from 2019 to 2026.

Joyce won the All-Ireland Senior Football Championship twice with Galway as a player and received three All Star Awards. He won four Galway Senior Football Championships while playing for the Killererin club. He also captained Ireland in the International Rules Series.

In May 2020, the Irish Independent named Joyce at number sixteen in its "Top 20 footballers in Ireland over the past 50 years".

== Early life ==
He won a Hogan Cup (All-Ireland title) while representing St Jarlath's College in 1994.

== Playing career ==
=== Club ===
Joyce played for the Killererin club, making his senior debut at the age of 15 in 1992. His father Paddy was part of the club's team that secured promotion from the Galway Junior Football Championship (JFC) to the Galway Senior Football Championship (SFC) in 1968. His uncle Billy was part of the 1970s teams that won the club's first Galway SFC titles.

Pádraic Joyce, along with his brother Tommie and cousin Nicholas (Billy Joyce's son) all played critical parts in Killererin's late twentieth-century revival. The club spent 21 years without a Galway SFC until 1999, when it defeated An Cheathrú Rua later adding three more Galway SFCs in 2004, 2007 and 2010, each of which Joyce was part.

Joyce won his first Galway SFC medal with the club in 1999, defeating An Cheathrú Rua by four points after a replay. 2001 was his next appearance at the final stage of the Galway SFC, but a penalty miss in the second half from his cousin, Nicky Joyce, proved crucial as the club lost to Annaghdown by two points. Two more years passed before Killererin returned to the final, in 2003 against Caltra, but a Michael Meehan-inspired Caltra team won by a margin of 15 points. However, the following year, Joyce and Killererin secured the title for the fourth time in the club's history, defeating Salthill-Knocknacarra by a goal in the final. Despite having had an injury, Joyce played the entire game and scored three points. Joyce won his third county medal in 2007, with a two-point defeat of Milltown (appearing at this stage for the first time since 1987). Killererin defeated Corofin 1–10 to 1–07 in the 2010 county final. In doing so, Joyce won his fourth county medal.

He won a Leinster Interfirm Senior Football Championship Medal with MCR Manpower Services in 2007.

His county senior FC final scoring record is as follows: 1999 vs An Cheathrú Rua: 0–02; 1999 vs An Cheathrú Rua (replay): 0-05; 2001 vs Annaghdown: 0–07; 2003 vs Caltra: 0-02; 2004 vs Salthill-Knocknacarra: 0–03; 2007 vs Milltown: 0–06; 2010 vs Corofin: 0–03.

He came out of retirement at the end of 2014 to help Killererin win a relegation play-off, then began full training again ahead of the 2015 season, which he said would be his last.

However, he was still winning medals with his club after being appointed as Galway senior manager in 2019.

=== College ===
Joyce was an important member of the IT Tralee team that won a Sigerson Cup in 1997.

=== Inter-county ===
He was an All-Ireland Minor Football Championship runner-up in 1994 and won two Connacht Minor Football Championship and Connacht Under-21 Football Championship medals.

Joyce won his first All-Ireland SFC title with Galway in 1998. He scored his team's only goal at the beginning of the game's second half, dummying past the goalkeeper before scoring into an empty net. Years after retiring as a player, Joyce spoke about that goal to RTÉ: "The night before the final, we were sat in the room in the Berkeley Court Hotel and Match of the Day (an English television programme about sport) came on. Alan Shearer was going through on goal, Newcastle v Leicester, he feigned to shoot and he went left. Donnellan was sitting across the room from me, with a bottle of tae in one hand, a chicken sandwich in the other and he managed to muster the words out, 'Oh, you'll do that tomorrow when I pass it to you and go around the keeper'. The following day, Michael got the ball and passed it in. I'll never forget looking at the Hogan Stand, the ball coming down and I says, the bottle of tae… Alan Shearer… round the goalie. It's amazing that all that imagery was in the mind." Galway defeated the Mick O'Dwyer-managed Kildare by a scoreline of 1–14 to 1–10 in that game, at Croke Park. Joyce was then awarded an All Star in for his performances in 1998.

2000 brought his second All-Ireland SFC final when Galway faced Kerry at Croke Park. The game finished at 0–14 a-piece, meaning a replay was scheduled. Joyce scored six points overall but it was not enough, Kerry winning the replay by a scoreline of 0–17 to 1–10. Despite losing the final, Joyce was given his second All Star Award.

Galway's All-Ireland SFC title win in 2001 was the most successful year for Joyce. Galway had a 0–17 to 0–8 victory over Meath in the final at Croke Park. Joyce's contributions in the second half proved vital, though he was quiet in the first half. He scored 0–10 in that game, five from that total kicked off his right foot, the other five kicked off his left, and scoring nine of the ten points in the game's second half. Overall, he scored 3–45 in the championship, sixteen points clear of his nearest challenger, Ger Heavin. In recognition of his performances for Galway he was awarded the 2002 Texaco Footballer of the Year award and another All Star.

He won the Connacht Senior Football Championship as a player on six occasions: in 1998, 2000, 2002, 2003, 2005 and 2008. He scored a goal and three points in the last of those wins, against Mayo.

In November 2012, Joyce confirmed his retirement from inter-county football after spending fifteen years on the panel.

=== International ===
Joyce was a regular member of Ireland's international rules football squad for many years. Arguably his finest moment in the International Rules Series came during the 2004 edition, when Joyce captained the team to a 132–82 victory over Australia. He scored a goal (six points) and one over (three points) in the first test and a goal and two overs in the second test. Joyce excelled in both tests against the Aussies and secured a record victory.

Joyce retired from the playing side in 2005 but maintained a role within the team as part of Seán Boylan's set-up, as Connacht selector. On 6 August 2008, Joyce stepped down from the Irish international rules football management set-up as Connacht selector, citing his commitment to the Galway footballers. Joyce also ruled out playing in the series again, having last lined out as captain in Australia three years previously. "I have notified Sean Boylan I wouldn't be taking part. I just don't have time for it," I haven't time to be looking at games now that Galway are still involved. I just want to give my all to Galway for the last couple of years that is in it."

== Managerial career ==
In November 2018, Joyce was appointed manager of the Galway under-20 team. He led the team to a Connacht Championship.

Joyce replaced his former teammate Kevin Walsh as senior manager amid a Supermac's team sponsorship dispute in 2019, with his stated aim being to win an All-Ireland SFC.

Galway qualified for the 2020 Connacht SFC final against Mayo without playing any games. The team's quarter-final against New York and its semi-final against Sligo could not be played due to the impact of the COVID-19 pandemic on Gaelic games. Galway lost to Mayo by one point in the 2020 Connacht SFC final. No All-Ireland SFC qualifiers were held in 2020, also due to the pandemic.

In the 2021 Connacht SFC, Galway defeated Roscommon in the semi-final, in what was Joyce's first championship win as manager. But Galway lost to Mayo in the final, despite having a five-point lead at half-time.

In the 2022 All-Ireland SFC, Galway reached the final for the first time since 2001. However, Galway were unable to claim their tenth All-Ireland title, after losing to Kerry.

In the 2024 All-Ireland SFC, Galway reached the final for the second time in three years. However, Galway were unable to claim their tenth All-Ireland title, after losing to Armagh.

Following speculation that Joyce would step down as manager after Galway's 2026 All-Ireland quarter-final loss to Dublin in June 2026, his departure was confirmed on 3 September after seven years in charge.

== Personal life ==
Joyce is a father to a daughter. He lives in Tuam. His spare time is devoted to television, and playing darts and snooker.

== Career statistics ==
Team	Season	Connacht		All-Ireland		Total	
Team	Season	Apps	Score	Apps	Score	Apps	Score
Galway	1998	4	0-14	2	1-10	6	1-24
Galway	1999	4	2-12	0	0-00	4	2-12
Galway	2000	3	0-09	3	0-14	6	0-23
Galway	2001	2	3-09	6	0-35	8	3-44
Galway	2002	3	0-15	1	0-06	4	0-21
Galway	2003	3	0-09	2	0-06	7	0-15
Galway	2004	2	2-08	2	1-07	4	3-15
Galway	2005	3	0-04	1	0-07	3	0-11
Galway	2006	3	0-06	1	0-01	4	0-08
Galway	2007	3	0-10	1	0-00	4	0-10
Galway	2008	3	2-09	1	0-01	4	2-10
Galway	2009	3	0-06	1	0-01	4	0-07
Galway	2010	3	1-17	1	0-06	4	1-23
Galway	2011	1	0-01	1	0-04	4	2-12
Galway	2012	2	0-00	1	0-02	3	0-02
Total		42	10-129	24	2-100	66	12-229

Awards
Preceded by Seamus Moynihan	Texaco Footballer of the Year; 2001	Succeeded by Kieran McGeeney
Preceded by Seamus Moynihan (Kerry)	All-Ireland Senior Football Final; Man of the Match; 2001	Succeeded by Oisín McConville (Armagh)
Sporting positions
Preceded by Kieran Fitzgerald	Galway Senior Football Captain; 2008–2009	Succeeded by Damien Burke
Preceded by Kevin Walsh	Galway Senior Football Manager; 2019–2026	Succeeded by TBC
