= Gary Fahey =

Galway Gaelic footballer

Personal information
- Native name: Gearóid Ó Fathaigh (Irish)
- Born: Galway, Ireland
- Height: 1.83 m (6 ft 0 in)

Sport
- Sport: Gaelic football
- Position: Full Back
Club
- Years: Club
- Killannin
College
- Years: College
- UCG
College titles
- Sigerson titles: 1
Inter-county
- Years: County
- 1992–2004: Galway
Inter-county titles
- Connacht titles: 5
- All-Irelands: 2
- NFL: 0
- All Stars: 0

Gary Fahey is a former Gaelic footballer who captained the Galway county team in the All-Ireland Senior Football Championship. Playing primarily in a full-back position, Fahey won five Connacht Senior medals and two All-Ireland medals. He is the brother of Niamh Fahey, the Republic of Ireland women's national football team player.

== Playing career ==
=== College ===
Gary Fahey won a Sigerson Cup with UCG, defeating Queen's in the 1992 final.

=== Inter-county ===
His inter-county career began in 1992 when he joined the Galway panel after playing a role in UCG's Sigerson Cup-winning team. Fahey made his inter-county debut in the summer of 1992 when he came on as a substitute in a defeat against Mayo in Castlebar. In the 1995 All-Ireland Senior Football Championship, Galway won the Connacht title under Bosco McDermott. They defeated Mayo in Tuam Stadium to win their first provincial title in 8 years. Galway later lost to Tyrone in the All-Ireland semi-final.

Mayo defeated Galway in both the 1996 and 1997 Connacht campaigns where they also lost both subsequent All-Ireland finals. John O'Mahony was brought in as Galway manager in September 1997, and in the 1998 All-Ireland Senior Football Championship final, the team defeated Kildare in the All-Ireland final. It was Galway's first All-Ireland win in 32 years.

In the next four years, Fahey played in several big games for Galway. In 1999, a hamstring injury kept him out of the Connacht final. However, he returned for the 2000 All-Ireland Senior Football Championship season where Galway re-claimed the Connacht title after defeating Leitrim before losing to Kerry in the All-Ireland Final after a replay.

Galway began the 2001 championship season with a defeat to Roscommon. However, through the new 'back-door' system, and following victories over Wicklow, Cork, Armagh, Roscommon (again) and Derry, they met Meath in the All-Ireland final. Galway beat Meath in the final by nine points, and Fahey collected his second All-Ireland medal. He also lifted the Sam Maguire trophy as captain.

Galway won the Connacht title again in both the 2002 championship and 2003 competition.

John O'Mahony departed as Galway manager in 2004 and Fahey retired from inter-county football shortly afterwards.

Achievements
Preceded by Seamus Moynihan (Kerry)	All-Ireland SFC winning captain 2001	Succeeded by Kieran McGeeney (Armagh)
