= Diarmaid Blake =

Irish Gaelic footballer

Personal information
- Native name: Diarmaid de Bláca (Irish)
- Born: Galway, Ireland
- Height: 1.85 m (6 ft 1 in)

Sport
- Sport: Gaelic Football
- Position: Centre Back
Club
- Years: Club
- 1999–present: Milltown
Inter-county
Years	County	Apps (scores)
2002–2013	Galway	51 (0-1)
Inter-county titles
- Connacht titles: 4

Diarmaid Blake is a Gaelic footballer from Galway. Blake plays his club football with Milltown and was a former member of the Galway senior team.

Blake came to prominence as a student for St. Jarlath’s College of Tuam, playing in two Hogan Cup finals, however, appearing on the losing side both times in 1999 and 2001. He captured his All-Ireland winner’s medal as a part of the Galway 2002 All-Ireland Under-21 Football Championship winning team.

Blake’s senior career with Galway took off as he started at centre back in four consecutive Connacht finals between 2006 and 2009 and a National Football League final against Kerry in 2006. He was also nominated for an All Star Award during this period.

== Honours ==
St. Jarlath’s College

- Connacht Colleges Senior Football Championship : (3) 1999, 2000, 2001

Galway

- Connacht Under-21 Football Championship : (1) 2002
  - Runner-up : (1) 2003
- All-Ireland Under-21 Football Championship : (1) 2002
- Connacht Senior Football Championship : (4) 2002, 2003, 2005, 2008
  - Runner-up : (3) 2006, 2007, 2009
