= Séamus McHugh =

Galway Gaelic footballer

Séamus McHugh (born 26 March 1956) is an Irish former Gaelic footballer. His league and championship career at senior level with the Galway county team spanned thirteen seasons from 1975 until 1988.

== Honours ==
Galway

- Connacht Senior Football Championship (6): 1976, 1982, 1983 (c), 1984 (c), 1986, 1987

Sporting positions
Preceded by Gay McManus	Galway Senior Football Captain; 1983-1984	Succeeded by
