= Michael Donnellan (footballer) =

Galway Gaelic footballer (born 1977)

Personal information
- Native name: Mícheál Ó Domhnalláin (Irish)
- Born: 28 February 1977 (age 49) Galway, Ireland
- Height: 1.85 m (6 ft 1 in)

Sport
- Sport: Gaelic football
- Position: Centre half-forward
Clubs
- Years: Club
- 1995–2003 2004–2007: Dunmore McHales; Salthill–Knocknacarra
Club titles
- Galway titles: 1
- Connacht titles: 1
- All-Ireland Titles: 1
College
- Years: College
- IT Tralee
College titles
- Sigerson titles: 1
Inter-county
- Years: County
- 1997–2006: Galway
Inter-county titles
- Connacht titles: 5
- All-Irelands: 2
- All Stars: 3

Michael Donnellan (born 28 February 1977) is an Irish former Gaelic footballer who played at senior level for the Galway county team.

== Family ==
He is the son of a former politician and footballer, John Donnellan, and grandson of politician and footballer Michael Donnellan. All three of them captained the Galway football team during their careers.

== Playing career ==
Donnellan first came to prominence as a member of the talented St Jarlath's College in Tuam team of the early 1990s. He played a crucial role in their Hogan Cup–winning season of 1994 alongside future Galway teammates Declan Meehan, Tomás Meehan, John Divilly, Tommy Joyce and Pádraic Joyce. They reached the Connacht final the following year but lost out to their biggest rivals, St Patrick's College, Tuam. He would later once more play alongside Joyce with the Tralee IT team that won the 1998 Sigerson Cup.

=== Senior ===
In 1998, Donnellan won his first All-Ireland SFC medal as part of the Galway side that won the 1998 championship. During the first half of the final against Kildare, Donnellan picked up the ball inside the heart of his own defence and proceeded to go on an amazing run, soloing the length of the field while exchanging a one-two with Kevin Walsh in midfield. As he approached the Kildare goal, he laid the ball off to Derek Savage, who passed to Seán Óg De Paor. De Paor slotted the ball over the bar. The score re-invigorated the Galway team, who were losing at the time. Donnellan's overall performance inspired Galway to their first football title in 32 years and completed a unique hat-trick of senior All-Ireland medals for his family, as he followed in the footsteps of his father John (1966) and his grandfather Mick (1925). The final score was 1–14 to 1–10. That solo run was later voted No.1 in the Top 20 GAA Moments in 2003. Donnellan was named Texaco Footballer of the Year that year.

After reaching another All-Ireland SFC final in 2000, lost to Kerry after a replay, Donnellan and Galway won the 2001 All-Ireland SFC title. After losing to Roscommon in the Connacht SFC semi-final, Galway entered the newly introduced back-door qualifiers and defeated Wicklow, Armagh and Cork to reach the All-Ireland SFC quarter-finals. They gained revenge over Roscommon with 0–14 to 1–5 victory to reach the All-Ireland SFC semi-final, where they defeated Derry by three points. In the 2001 All-Ireland SFC final, they outclassed a Meath team by 0–17 to 0–08.

=== Club ===
Donnellan had a high-profile transfer to the Salthill–Knocknacarra club in 2005. He soon won an All-Ireland Senior Club Football Championship with his adopted club. He gave a man-of-the-match performance in the 2005 final, where Salthill narrowly edged out Antrim GAA club St Gall's.

== Soccer ==
In December 1999, Donnellan signed for Don O'Riordan at Galway United for the rest of the 1999–2000 League of Ireland season. According to the Irish Independent, he could play "in midfield or in attack".

== Since ==
After being hampered by injury over many years, Donnellan decided to quit playing Gaelic football at the end of the 2006 season, ending a career during which he won nearly ever honour in the game.

In May 2020, the Irish Independent named Donnellan as one of the "dozens of brilliant players" who narrowly missed selection for its "Top 20 footballers in Ireland over the past 50 years".
