= Nicky Joyce =

Irish Gaelic footballer

Personal information
- Native name: Nicholás Seoige (Irish)
- Born: 25 December 1983 (age 42) Galway, Ireland

Sport
- Sport: Gaelic Football
- Position: Left corner forward
Club
- Years: Club
- Killererin
Club titles
- Galway titles: 4
Inter-county
- Years: County
- 2003–2012: Galway
Inter-county titles
- Connacht titles: 3

Nicky Joyce is an inter-county Gaelic football player for Galway. He plays his club football with Killererin and was a member of the Galway senior team from 2003 to 2010 but returned in 2012.

== Playing career ==
=== County ===
Joyce began playing for senior in early 2003 after being called up by former manager John O'Mahony to play alongside his cousin Pádraic Joyce. He has won the Connacht Senior Football Championship on three occasions in 2003, 2005 and 2008.
