= 1912 Fitzgibbon Cup =

Irish collegiate hurling tournament

- Dates: 26–28 April 1912
- Teams: 3
- Champions: University College Dublin (1st title); J. Dwan (captain)
- Runners-up: University College Cork; P. M. Murphy (captain)

Tournament statistics
- Matches played: 3
- Goals scored: 10 (3.33 per match)
- Points scored: 7 (2.33 per match)

The 1912 Fitzgibbon Cup was the first staging of the Fitzgibbon Cup since its establishment by the Gaelic Athletic Association. The draw for the group stage fixtures took place at University College Cork on 10 January 1912. University College Dublin hosted the cup at Jones' Road from 26 April to 28 April 1912.

On 28 April 1912, University College Dublin won the Fitzgibbon Cup after topping the group with four points after recording two wins. University College Cork were second.

== Statistics ==
=== Group table ===
Team	Matches				Score			Pts
Team	Pld	W	D	L	For	Against	Diff	Pts
University College Dublin	2	2	0	0	7-00	1-03	+15	4
University College Cork	2	1	0	1	1-05	2-01	+1	2
University College Galway	2	0	0	2	2-02	7-03	-16	0

=== Group results ===
26 April 1912 Round 1	University College Dublin	6-00 - 1-01	University College Galway	Jones' Road

27 April 1912 Round 2	University College Cork	1-03 - 1-01	University College Galway	Jones' Road

28 April 1912 Round 3	University College Dublin	1-00 - 0-02	University College Cork	Jones' Road
