= Tomás Tierney =

Irish Gaelic footballer

Personal information
- Native name: Tomás Ó Tiarnaigh (Irish)
- Born: 14 September 1961 (age 65) Milltown, County Galway, Ireland
- Occupation: Venison Farmer

Sport
- Sport: Gaelic football
- Position: Centre Back/Mid-Field
Club
Years	Club	Apps (scores)
1979-1990	Milltown	37 (5-30)
Club titles
- Galway titles: 1
College
- Years: College
- UCG
College titles
- Sigerson titles: 3
Inter-county
- Years: County
- 1982-1989 1991-1993: Galway; Mayo
Inter-county titles
- Connacht titles: 7

Tomás Tierney (born 14 September 1961) is an Irish former Gaelic footballer who played at senior level for the Galway and Mayo county teams in the 1980s and 1990s. He played his club football for Milltown.

Tierney helped St Jarlath's College in Tuam win the Hogan Cup in 1978, as well as winning three Sigerson Cups with University College Galway in 1980/81, 1982/83 and 1983/84, captaining the side in 1984. In 1981 he was a member of the Galway team who were beaten in the All-Ireland Under 21 Football Championship final by Cork after a replay. He played on the Galway team who were beaten by Dublin in the 1983 All-Ireland Senior Football Championship Final. He also played football for Mayo in the early 1990s, becoming one of very few people to win Connacht medals with both Galway and Mayo.

== Honours ==
St Jarlath's College, Tuam

- Connacht Colleges Senior Football Championship : (2) 1978, 1979
- Hogan Cup : (1) 1978
  - Runner-up : (1) 1979

Milltown

- Galway Senior Football Championship : (1) 1981
  - Runner-up : (2) 1986, 1987

UCG

- Sigerson Cup : (3) 1980/81, 1982/83, 1983/84 (capt.)
  - Runner-up : (1) 1981/82

Galway

- Connacht Under-21 Football Championship : (1) 1981
- Connacht Senior Football Championship : (5) 1982, 1983, 1984, 1986 (capt.), 1987

Mayo

- Connacht Senior Football Championship : (2) 1992, 1993
  - Runner-up : (1) 1991
