= University of Galway GAA =

University sports club in Galway, Ireland

University of Galway G.A.A.
- C.L.G. Olscoil na Gaillimhe
- County: Galway
- Colours: Maroon and White
- Grounds: Dangan Sportsgrounds

Senior Club Championships
	All Ireland	Connacht champions	Galway champions
Football:	0	0	3
Hurling:	0	0	0

University of Galway GAA comprises the Gaelic football and hurling teams at the University of Galway.

Competitions in which they feature include the Sigerson Cup, Fitzgibbon Cup, and Walsh Cup.

Historically, they have won the Galway Senior Football Championship and contested the FBD Insurance League.

They are the second most prolific winners of the Sigerson Cup.

== Honours ==
Competition	Wins	Years won
Sigerson Cup	23	1912, 1922, 1934, 1935, 1937, 1938, 1939, 1940, 1941, 1942, 1949, 1951, 1955, 1961, 1963, 1964, 1980, 1981, 1983, 1984, 1992, 2003, 2022
Fitzgibbon Cup	10	1919, 1926, 1942, 1945, 1946, 1949, 1970, 1977, 1980, 2010
Galway Senior Football Championship	3	1933, 1934, 1937
Hodges Figgis Trophy	1	1981
FBD Insurance League	1	2005

== Notable players ==
Football

- Gareth Bradshaw
- Ger Cafferkey
- Matthew Clancy (Sigerson Cup winner 2003)
- Brendan Colleran (Sigerson Cup winner 2003)
- Enda Colleran (Sigerson Cup winning captain 1964)
- Damien Comer
- Seán Óg De Paor (Sigerson Cup winning captain 1992)
- Alan Dillon
- Jason Doherty
- Dessie Dolan
- Gary Fahey (Sigerson Cup winner 1992)
- Robert Finnerty
- Peadár Gardiner
- Mark Gottsche
- Seán Kelly (Sigerson Cup finalist 2018, winner 2022)
- Richie Lee (Sigerson Cup winning captain 1984)
- Mick Loftus (Sigerson Cup winner)
- Joe McDonagh
- Colm McFadden (Sigerson Cup winner 2003)
- Con McGrath (Sigerson Cup winner 1949)
- Gay McManus (Sigerson Cup winner 1980, winning captain 1981)
- John Maughan (won two Sigerson Cups while playing for UCG in the early 1980s)
- Michael Meehan (Sigerson Cup winner 2003)
- Kieran Molloy (played for NUIG and Corofin on the same day in February 2018)
- Ciarán Murtagh
- David O'Gara
- Matthew Tierney (Sigerson Cup winning captain 2022)
- Tomás Tierney (Sigerson Cup winner 1981 & 1983, winning captain 1984)

Hurling

- Enda Barrett
- Daithí Burke
- Niall Burke
- Conor Cleary
- John Conlon (scorer of the winning point in the 82nd minute of the final of the 2010 Fitzgibbon Cup)
- Joe Connolly (Fitzgibbon Cup winner 1977)
- Joseph Cooney
- Danny Cullen
- Barry Daly
- Cian Dillon
- Darragh Egan
- Cyril Farrell (Fitzgibbon Cup winner 1977)
- Pat Fleury (Fitzgibbon Cup winner 1977)
- Francis Forde
- Paul Gordon
- Tony Griffin
- John Hanbury
- Aidan Harte
- Conor Hayes (Fitzgibbon Cup winner 1977)
- Séamus Hennessy (Fitzgibbon Cup winner 2010)
- David Kenny
- John Lee (Fitzgibbon Cup winner 2010)
- Seán Loftus
- Jeffrey Lynskey
- Joe McDonagh (Fitzgibbon Cup winner 1977)
- Cathal Mannion
- Pádraic Mannion
- Stephen Molumphy
- Jamesie O'Connor
- Domhnall O'Donovan (Fitzgibbon Cup winner 2010)
- Colin Ryan
- Donal Tuohy (Fitzgibbon Cup winner 2010)
- Conor Whelan

== Management ==
Notable managers, associated with NUIG, have included:

- John Maughan, football manager in 2011 and 2012
- Maurice Sheridan, football manager, c. 2018
