= Mattie Coleman =

Irish Gaelic footballer

Matthew "Mattie" Coleman (born 4 November 1958) is an Irish retired Gaelic footballer who played as a left corner-back and as a left wing-back with the Galway senior team.

== Honours ==
Galway

- Connacht Senior Football Championship (5): 1982, 1983, 1984, 1986, 1987
