= 1998 All-Ireland Senior Football Championship =

Football championship

Championship details
- Dates: 3 May 1998 – 27 September 1998
- Teams: 32

All-Ireland Champions
- Winning team: Galway (8th win)
- Captain: Ray Silke
- Manager: John O'Mahony

All-Ireland Finalists
- Losing team: Kildare
- Captain: Glenn Ryan
- Manager: Mick O'Dwyer

Provincial Champions
- Munster: Kerry
- Leinster: Kildare
- Ulster: Derry
- Connacht: Galway

Championship statistics
- No. matches played: 36
- Goals total: 61 (1.69 per game)
- Points total: 860 (23.89 per game)
- Top Scorer: Declan Browne (2–29)
- Player of the Year: Jarlath Fallon; Michael Donnellan

The 1998 Bank of Ireland All-Ireland Senior Football Championship was the 112th edition of the GAA's premier Gaelic football competition. The championship began on 3 May 1998 and ended on 27 September 1998.

Galway's 1–14 to 1–10 victory over Kildare in the All-Ireland final meant that the Sam Maguire Cup returned to the county and the province of Connacht for the first time since 1966. This was Galway's eighth All-Ireland triumph in all. Kildare, managed by Mick O'Dwyer, had defeated the 1995 champions Dublin and the 1996 champions Meath to win their first Leinster title since 1956, before defeating the 1997 champions Kerry in the All-Ireland semi-final.

== Format ==
The Ulster, Munster, Leinster and Connacht championships were conducted as straight knock-out competitions. The Munster football championship for the 2nd year running had Kerry, Cork and Clare as byes to the semi-finals while Limerick, Tipperary and Waterford played a lone-first-round game with the bye team in a lone quarter final. The winners of each provincial competition went on to play in the All Ireland semi-finals.

== Results ==
=== Connacht Senior Football Championship ===
Quarter-finals
Sligo	0–14
London	1–07
Mayo	2–06
Galway	1–13

Semi-finals
Sligo	0–15
Roscommon	1–13
Leitrim	0–05
Galway	1–16

Final
Roscommon	0–17
Galway	1–17

Quarter-finals

24 May 1998 Quarter-final	Mayo	2–6 – 1–13	Galway	McHale Park, Castlebar
	K McDonald 2–1, M Sheridan 0–3, J Horan 0–1, N Connelly 0–1.		P Joyce 0–5, N Finnegan 0–4, D Savage 1–0, J Fallon 0–2, P Clancy 0–1, T Mannion 0–1.	Attendance: 30,000; Referee: E Neary (Sligo)

31 May 1998 Quarter-final	London	1–7 – 0–14	Sligo	Emerald GAA Grounds, Ruislip
	P Coggins 1–0, I Reilly 0–3, B McDonagh 0–1, D Gillespie 0–1, A O'Halloran 0–1, A Creamer 0–1.		S Davey 0–5, P Taylor 0–3, K Killeen 0–2, B Walsh 0–1, E O'Hara 0–1, T Brennan 0–1, M Maguire 0–1.	Attendance: 2,000; Referee: W Feeley (Mayo)

Semi-finals

14 June 1998 Semi-final	Leitrim	0–5 – 1–16	Galway	Páirc Sheáin Mhic Dhiarmada, Carrick On Shannon
	F McBrien 0–2, S Quinn 0–1, P McLoughlin 0–1, L Conlon 0–1.		N Finnegan 1–4, P Joyce 0–5, D Savage 0–3, T Mannion 0–1, S Óg de Paor 0–1, P Clancy 0–1, M Donnellan 0–1.	Attendance: 12,000; Referee: S Mac Éil (Mayo)

28 June 1998 Semi-final	Roscommon	2–12 – 1–15	Sligo	Dr. Hyde Park, Roscommon
	E Lohan 1–6, N Dineen 1–1, L Dowd, M Ryan 0–2 each, G Keane 0–1		P Taylor 0–6, S Davey 1–1, B Walsh 0–3, K Killeen 0–2, B Kilcoyne, N Clancy, G McGowan 0–1 each	Attendance: 15,000; Referee: S Prior (Leitrim)

5 July 1998 Semi-final replay	Sligo	0–15 – 1–13	Roscommon	Markievicz Park, Sligo
	P Taylor 0–8, K Killeen 0–3, S Davey 0–2, B Walsh, C O'Meara 0–1 each		T Grehan 1–2, E Lohan 0–5, N Dineen, L Dowd, T Ryan 0–2 each	Attendance: 12,000; Referee: S Prior (Leitrim)

Finals

19 July 1998 Final	Galway	0–11 – 0–11	Roscommon	Tuam Stadium, Tuam
	P Joyce, N Finnegan 0–3 each, J Fallon 0–2, S O Domhnaill, D Meehan, T Joyce 0–1 each		E Lohan 0–8, F O'Donnell, T Grehan, L Dowd 0–1 each	Attendance: 25,000; Referee: S Prior (Leitrim)

2 August 1998 Final replay	Roscommon	0–17 – 1–17 (aet)	Galway	Dr. Hyde Park, Roscommon
	E Lohan 0–8, N Dineen 0–3, F O'Donnell, T Grehan 0–2 each, L Dowd, V Glennon 0–1 each		M Donnellan 1–3, J Fallon 0–5, D Savage 0–3, S Óg de Paor, N Finnegan 0–2 each, P Joyce, S Walsh 0–1 each	Attendance: 30,000; Referee: S Prior (Leitrim)

=== Leinster Senior Football Championship ===
First round
Westmeath	1–18
Carlow	2–5
Longford	0–16 (1–16)
Wexford	2–17 (2–13)

Second round
Westmeath	3–14
Longford	1–13

Quarter-finals
Kildare	0–12
Dublin	1–8
Laois	1–15
Westmeath	0–15
Louth	3–14
Wicklow	1–11
Meath	3–10
Offaly	0–7

Semi-finals
Kildare	2–13
Laois	0–8
Meath	0–15
Louth	1–11

Final
Kildare	1–12
Meath	0–10

First round

3 May 1998 First round	Westmeath	1–18 – 2–5	Carlow	Cusack Park, Mullingar
	G Heavin 1–5, K Lyons 0–5, M Staunton 0–3, D Healy 0–1, P Conway 0–1, S Colleary 0–1, D Gavin 0–1, J Cooney 0–1.		M Carpenter 1–0, W Quinlan 1–0, R Donnelly 0–2, N Doyle 0–1, B Hannon 0–1, J Nevin 0–1.	Attendance: 5,677; Referee: N Cooney (Offaly)

3 May 1998 First round	Wexford	2–13 – 1–16	Longford	O'Kennedy Park, New Ross
	J Lawlor 1–3, J Hegarty 1–1, S Doran 0–4, L O'Brien 0–4, J Kinlough 0–1.		D Barry 0–9, N Sheridan 1–1, P Davis 0–3, E Barden 0–1, D Hanniffy 0–1, T Smullen 0–1.	Attendance: 5,000; Referee: J Harlin (Meath)

10 May 1998 First round replay	Longford	0–16 – 2–7	Wexford	Pearse Park, Longford
	P Davis 0–8, D Barry 0–3, P Lynch 0–2, D Hanniffy 0–1, P Farrell 0–1, T Smullen 0–1.		L O'Brien 0–4, S Doran 1–0, M Mahon 1–0, J Hegarty 0–2, J Lawlor 0–1.	Attendance: 7,500; Referee: E Whelan (Laois)

Second round

17 May 1998 Second round	Longford	1–13 – 3–14	Westmeath	Pearse Park, Longford
	D Barry 1–4, P Davis 0–5, D Hanniffy 0–2, T Smullen 0–1, P Farrell 0–1.		G Heavin 1–5, P Conway 0–4, J Deehan 1–0, K Lyons 1–0, D Healy 0–1, D Gavin 0–1, M Staunton 0–1, S Colleary 0–1, M O'Reilly 0–1.	Attendance: S McCormack (Meath); Referee: 10,012

Quarter-finals

24 May 1998 Quarter-final	Meath	3–10 – 0–7	Offaly	Croke Park, Dublin
	B Reilly 1–3, R Magee 1–0, S Dillon 1–0, T Dowd 0–3, T Giles 0–3, G Geraghty 0–1.		C Quinn 0–4, C McManus 0–2, R Malone 0–1.	Attendance: 48,856; Referee: P Casserley (Westmeath)

31 May 1998 Quarter-final	Louth	3–14 – 1–11	Wicklow	Drogheda Park, Drogheda
	C Kelly 1–5, S White, A Hoey 1–2 each, N Malone, J Donaldson, O McDonnell, C O'Hanlon, G Curran 0–1 each		D Coffey 1–3, C Daye, S Byrne 0–2 each, R Coffey, K O'Brien, K Byrne, J Behan 0–1 each	Referee: J Bannon (Longford)

7 June 1998 Quarter-final	Laois	1–15 – 0–15	Westmeath	Croke Park, Dublin
	S Kelly 1–2, I Fitzgerald, M Lawlor 0–4 each, C Parkinson 0–2, T Maher, C Conway, B McDonald 0–1 each		T Cleary 0–5, G Heavin 0–4, P Conway 0–3, M Staunton 0–2, K Lyons 0–1	Attendance: 60,058; Referee: S McCormack (Meath)

7 June 1998 Quarter-final	Dublin	0–10 – 0–10	Kildare	Croke Park, Dublin
	D Darcy 0–4, J Gavin 0–2, D Farrell, D Harrington, B Stynes, J Sherlock 0–1 each		P Graven 0–4, N Buckley, E McCormack, K Dwyer 0–2 each	Attendance: 60,058; Referee: B White (Wexford)

21 June 1998 Quarter-final replay	Kildare	0–12 – 1–8	Dublin	Croke Park, Dublin
	P Graven 0–4, N Buckley 0–3, E McCormack 0–2, G Ryan 0–1, A Rainbow 0–1, K O'Dwyer 0–1.		D Darcy 1–5, J Gavin 0–1, P Curran 0–1, B Stynes 0–1.	Referee: M Coffey (Galway)

Semi-finals

28 June 1998 Semi-final	Meath	0–15 – 1–11	Louth	Croke Park, Dublin
	T Dowd 0–5, G Geraghty 0–3, T Giles 0–3, J McGuinness, R Magee, B Reilly, H Traynor 0–1 each		S White 1–3, C O'Hanlon 0–3, C Kelly 0–2, G Curran, A Hoey, A Rooney 0–1 each	Referee: B White (Wexford)

19 July 1998 Semi-final	Kildare	2–13 – 0–8	Laois	Croke Park, Dublin
	P Graven 1–4, N Buckley 1–1, K O'Dwyer 0–3, P Brennan 0–2, D Earley, E McCormack, M Lynch 0–1 each		S Kelly 0–3, M Lawlor 0–2, D Conroy, D Lawlor, C Conway 0–1 each	Referee: P McGann (Westmeath)

Final

2 August 1998 Final	Kildare	1–12 – 0–10	Meath	Croke Park, Dublin
	P Graven 0–4, B Murphy 1–0, E McCormack, W McCreery, K O'Dwyer 0–2 each, D Kerrigan, A Rainbow 0–1 each	Report	T Giles 0–3, R McGee 0–3, J McDermott, O Murphy, T Dowd, J Devine 0–1 each	Attendance: 62,504; Referee: J Bannon (Longford)

=== Munster Senior Football Championship ===
First round
Tipperary	1–13
Limerick	1–12

Quarter-final
Waterford	0–07
Tipperary	1–16

Semi-finals
Clare	0–12
Tipperary	1–16
Cork	1–11
Kerry	1–14

Final
Tipperary	1–10
Kerry	0–17

First round

10 May 1998 First round	Limerick	1–12 – 1–13	Tipperary	Gaelic Grounds, Limerick
	P Galvin 0–4, M Reidy 1–0, T Cummins 0–3, D Reidy 0–2, J Quane 0–1, S Ahern 0–1, N Frewen 0–1.		D Browne 1–6, P Lambert 0–4, B Burke 0–2, B Cummins 0–1.	Attendance: 2,730; Referee: M Collins (Cork)

Quarter-final

30 May 1998 Quarter-final	Tipperary	1–16 – 0–7	Waterford	Ned Hall Park, Clonmel
	D Browne 0–9, J Williams 1–0, P Lambert 0–2, Seán Maher 0–2, M Spillane 0–1, B Cummins 0–1, D Foley 0–1.		Martin Power 0–5, O Costello 0–1, I Daniels 0–1.	Attendance: 2,000; Referee: M O'Sullivan (Kerry)

Semi-finals

28 June 1998 Semi-final	Tipperary	1–16 – 0–12	Clare	Gaelic Grounds, Limerick
	D Browne 1–7, P Lambert 0–3, B Cummins 0–3, J Williams 0–2, D Foley 0–1		M Daly 0–3, P Hehir 0–3, M Hynes, J Enright, G Keane 0–2 each	Attendance: 8,378; Referee: N Barrett (Cork)

5 July 1998 Semi-final	Kerry	1–14 – 1–11	Cork	Fitzgerald Stadium, Killarney
	M Fitzgerald 1–4, J Crowley 0–5, MF Russell 0–4, D Ó Cinnéide 0–1		J Kavanagh 0–6, A O'Regan 1–1, A Dorgan, L Tompkins, T Davis, C O'Sullivan 0–1 each	Attendance: 43,994; Referee: P Russell (Tipperary)

Final

2 August 1998 Final	Tipperary	1–10 – 0–17	Kerry	Semple Stadium, Thurles
	D Browne 0–7, J Williams 1–0, B Cummins, D Foley, C McGrath 0–1 each	Report	M Fitzgerald 0–10, P Laide, D Ó Cinnéide 0–2 each, D Daly, MF Russell, J Crowley 0–1 each	Attendance: 27,263; Referee: N Barrett (Cork)

=== Ulster Senior Football Championship ===
Preliminary round
Tyrone	2–07
Down	0–15

Quarter-finals
Monaghan	0–11
Derry	3–13
Down	0–11
Armagh	0–16
Antrim	0–11
Donegal	1–11
Fermanagh	0–11
Cavan	0–13

Semi-finals
Derry	2–13
Armagh	1–12
Donegal	0–15
Cavan	0–13

Final
Derry	1–07
Donegal	0–08

Preliminary round

17 May 1998 Preliminary round	Tyrone	2–7 – 0–15	Down	Healy Park, Omagh
	A Cush 1–3, S Lawn 1–1, E Gormley 0–2, B Dooher 0–1.		R Carr 0–5, S Mullholland 0–5, M Linden 0–2, G Deegan 0–1, Shane Ward 0–1, C Deegan 0–1.	Attendance: 13,500; Referee: P McEneaney (Monaghan)

Quarter-finals

24 May 1998 Quarter-final	Antrim	0–11 – 1–11	Donegal	Casement Park, Belfast
	J McManus 0–6, M Boyle 0–2, K Madden 0–1, K Brady 0–1, F Wilson 0–1.		T Boyle 0–5, B Devenny 1–0, A Sweeney 0–3, J Gildea 0–1, N Hegarty 0–1, J McGuinness 0–1.	Attendance: 6,000; Referee: B Crowe (Cavan)

31 May 1998 Quarter-final	Derry	3–13 – 0–11	Monaghan	Celtic Park, Derry
	E Burns 1–3, G Magill, J Cassidy 1–1 each, J Brolly, D Doogan 0–4 each		D Smith 0–8, D Freeman 0–2, M Daly 0–1	Referee: M McGrath (Donegal)

7 June 1998 Quarter-final	Cavan	0–13 – 0–11	Fermanagh	Breffni Park, Cavan
	D McCabe, L Reilly 0–4 each, R Carolan 0–3, M Leddy, M Graham 0–1 each		Raymond Gallagher, Rory Gallagher 0–4 each, C Donnelly, C Curran, R Johnson 0–1 each	Referee: B Gorman (Armagh)

14 June 1998 Quarter-final	Down	0–11 – 0–16	Armagh	St Tiernach's Park, Clones
	D Dougan 2–0, J Brolly, S Downey 0–4 each, E Burns, G Magill 0–2 each, E Muldoon 0–1		D Marsden 0–7, C O'Rourke 0–3, O McConville, G Houlihan 0–2 each, P McGrane, P McKeever 0–1 each	Attendance: 24,300; Referee: M McBrien (Fermanagh)

Semi-final

21 June 1998 Semi-final	Cavan	0–13 – 0–15	Donegal	St Tiernach's Park, Clones
	R Carolan 0–7, B Rogers 0–1, L Reilly 0–1, R Cunningham 0–1, M Graham 0–1, F Cahill 0–1, D McCabe 0–1.		T Boyle 0–5, M Boyle 0–3, B Devenny 0–1, J Gildea 0–1, J McGuinness 0–1, J Duffy 0–1, D Dwyer 0–1, N McGinley 0–1, B Roper 0–1.	Attendance: 26,811; Referee: M McBrien (Fermanagh)

28 June 1998 Semi-final	Armagh	0–12 – 2–13	Derry	Athletic Grounds, Armagh
	P McKeever, O McConville 0–4 each, D Marsden 0–2, G Houlihan, J McNulty 0–1 each		D Dougan 2–0, J Brolly, S Downey 0–4 each, E Burns, G Magill 0–2 each, E Muldoon 0–1	Attendance: 21,000; Referee: P McEneaney (Monaghan)

Final

19 July 1998 Final	Derry	1–7 – 0–8	Donegal	St Tiernach's Park, Clones
	J Brolly 1–2, G Magill 0–2, E Burns, D Dougan, J Cassidy 0–1 each		T Boyle 0–3, D Devenney 0–2, J Duffey, A Sweeney, N Hegarty 0–1 each	Referee: J Curran (County Tyrone)

=== All-Ireland Senior Football Championship ===
Semi-finals
Kildare	0–13
Kerry	1–09
Galway	0–16
Derry	1–08

Final
Kildare	1–10
Galway	1–14

Semi-finals

23 August 1998 Semi-final	Derry	1–8 – 0–16	Galway	Croke Park, Dublin
	G Coleman 1–1, E Burns 0–3, E Gormley 0–2, P McFlynn, J Cassidy 0–1 each	Report	P Joyce 0–8, J Fallon 0–4, M Donnellan 0–2, N Finnegan, S Ó Domhnaill 0–1 each	Attendance: 38,569; Referee: J Bannon (Longford)

30 August 1998 Semi-final	Kildare	0–13 – 1–9	Kerry	Croke Park, Dublin
	P Graven 0–4, K O'Dwyer 0–3, M Lynch, E McCormack 0–2 each, J Finn, P Brennan 0–1 each	Report	M Fitzgerald 0–4, J Crowley 1–0, D Ó Cinnéide 0–2, D Daly, MF Russell, J Crowley 0–1 each	Attendance: 65,002; Referee: M Curley (Galway)

Final

27 September 1998 Final	Galway	1–14 – 1–10	Kildare	Croke Park, Dublin
	P Joyce 1–2, N Finnegan 0–4, J Fallon 0–3, M Donnellan, S Óg de Paor 0–2 each, S Ó Domhnaill 0–1		D Earley 1–1, P Brennan 0–3, E McCormack, K O'Dwyer 0–2 each, D Kerrigan, N Buckley 0–1 each	Attendance: 65,886; Referee: J Bannon (Longford)

== Championship statistics ==
=== Miscellaneous ===
- Kildare win the Leinster Championship for the first time since 1956, and reach their first All Ireland final since 1935.
- The Galway-Derry All Ireland semi-final was the first meeting of them.
- Galway won the All Ireland title for 1st in 32 years also were the first Connacht team since then to do so.

=== Top scorers ===
Overall

Rank	Player	County	Tally	Total	Matches	Average
1	Declan Browne	Tipperary	2–29	35	4	8.75
2	Eddie Lohan	Roscommon	1–27	30	4	7.50
3	Pádraic Joyce	Galway	1–24	27	6	4.50
4	Pádraic Graven	Kildare	1–20	23	6	3.83
5	Maurice Fitzgerald	Kerry	1–18	21	3	7.00
5	Niall Finnegan	Galway	1–18	21	6	3.50
7	Ger Heavin	Westmeath	2–14	20	3	6.66
8	Dessie Barry	Longford	1–16	19	3	6.33
9	Paul Taylor	Sligo	0–17	17	3	5.66
10	Pádraic Davis	Sligo	0–16	16	3	5.33
10	Jarlath Fallon	Galway	0–16	16	6	2.66

Single game

Rank	Player	County	Tally	Total	Opposition
1	Declan Browne	Tipperary	1-07	10	Clare
1	Maurice Fitzgerald	Kerry	0–10	10	Tipperary
3	Declan Browne	Tipperary	1-06	9	Limerick
3	Eddie Lohan	Roscommon	1-06	9	Sligo
3	Dessie Barry	Longford	0-09	9	Wexford
3	Declan Browne	Tipperary	0-09	9	Waterford
7	Ger Heavin	Westmeath	1-05	8	Carlow
7	Declan Darcy	Dublin	1-05	8	Kildare
7	Ger Heavin	Westmeath	1-05	8	Longford
7	Colin Kelly	Louth	1-05	8	Wicklow
7	Paul Taylor	Sligo	0-08	8	Roscommon
7	Eddie Lohan	Roscommon	0-08	8	Galway
7	Eddie Lohan	Roscommon	0-08	8	Galway
7	Pádraic Davis	Longford	0-08	8	Wexford
7	Declan Smyth	Monaghan	0-08	8	Derry
7	Pádraic Joyce	Galway	0-08	8	Derry

== Roll of Honour ==
- Kerry – 31 (1997)
- Dublin – 22 (1995)
- Galway – 8 (1998)
- Meath – 6 (1996)
- Cork – 6 (1990)
- Down – 5 (1994)
- Wexford – 5 (1918)
- Cavan – 5 (1952)
- Kildare – 4 (1928)
- Tipperary – 4 (1920)
- Offaly – 3 (1982)
- Louth – 3 (1957)
- Mayo – 3 (1951)
- Roscommon – 2 (1944)
- Limerick – 2 (1896)
- Donegal – 1 (1992)
- Derry – 1 (1993)
