= Ray Silke =

Irish Gaelic footballer

Personal information
- Nickname: Silkey
- Born: 17 August 1970 (age 56) Galway, Ireland
- Occupation: Teacher.
- Height: 1.85 m (6 ft 1 in)

Sport
- Sport: Gaelic Football
- Position: Right Half Back
Club
- Years: Club
- 1988–2004: Corofin
Club titles
- Galway titles: 7
- Connacht titles: 3
- All-Ireland Titles: 1
Inter-county
- Years: County
- 1992–2001: Galway
Inter-county titles
- Connacht titles: 3
- All-Irelands: 2
- NFL: 0
- All Stars: 0

Ray Silke (born 17 August 1970) is a former Irish sportsperson. He played Gaelic football with his local club Corofin and was their centre-back and captain when they won the All-Ireland on St Patrick's Day in 1998.

Corofin were the first Connacht Club to ever win the Andy Kerrigan Cup in '98 and the club won it several more times after that.

He was also a member of the Galway senior inter-county team from the 1990s until 2001. In 1997 Silke was named captain of the team. Silke captained Galway to their first All-Ireland title thirty-two years in 1998 when they defeated Mick O' Dwyer's Kildare in the final. Silke continued to teach after retiring from football and occasionally makes media appearances to report and analysis on many games. Silke is married with 4 children. Silkes nephews currently play at senior level for both Corofin GAA and Galway GAA

Sporting positions
Preceded by	Galway Senior Football Captain; 1998	Succeeded by
Achievements
Preceded by Jim McConville (Crossmaglen Rangers)	All-Ireland Senior Club Football winning captain 1998	Succeeded by John McEntee (Crossmaglen Rangers)
Preceded by Liam Hassett (Kerry)	All-Ireland Senior Football winning captain 1998	Succeeded by Graham Geraghty (Meath)
