= Kevin Walsh (Gaelic footballer) =

Galway Gaelic footballer and manager

Personal information
- Native name: Caoimhín Breathnach (Irish)
- Born: 5 November 1969 (age 56) Galway, Ireland
- Height: 6 ft 4 1.93 m (6 ft 4 in)

Sport
- Sport: Gaelic football
- Position: Midfield
Club
- Years: Club
- 1986–2004, 2014: Killannin
Inter-county
- Years: County
- 1988–2004: Galway
Inter-county titles
- Connacht titles: 5
- All-Irelands: 2
- NFL: 0
- All Stars: 3

Kevin Walsh (born 5 November 1969 in Galway) is an Irish Gaelic football coach, manager and former player. He won three All Stars and two All-Ireland Senior Football Championships while playing at senior level for the Galway county team.

Walsh served as manager of the senior Sligo county team from 2008 to 2013 and his native Galway from 2014 to 2019.

== Playing career ==
An effective midfielder, Walsh played at club level with Killannin, winning intermediate county titles in 1991 and 2014 against near neighbours Moycullen at 45 years of age and at inter-county level with Galway. He was a key member of the latter team during the late 1990s and early 2000s and collected two All-Ireland titles and four Connacht titles during that time.

== Coaching career ==
=== Club ===
Upon retirement from inter-county play, Walsh became involved in coaching. He had been in charge of the Aran Islands junior footballers in 2008.

=== Connacht ===
Walsh was a selector with the Connacht inter-provincial team for a number of seasons.

=== Sligo ===
Walsh volunteered to manage the Sligo senior football team, and was appointed in November 2008.

He led Sligo from Division 4 to Division 2 of the National Football League in his first two years in charge winning the Division 4 and 3 titles in the process. He also led Sligo to the Connacht Junior Football Championship and All-Ireland Junior Football Championship in 2010. In 2011, he led Sligo to a second Connacht Junior Football Championship.

In 2013, Walsh fell out with Eamonn O'Hara after O'Hara launched a stinging tirade at his former manager on national television and told him to resign. The incident occurred following Sligo's first round elimination from the Connacht Championship at the hands of London. O'Hara gave his inside view of the chaos affecting the county as Pat Spillane peered down his nose over O'Hara's right shoulder, baffled at the news that a county like Sligo could be in an even worse state than Kerry.

There are a lot of problems within the county board from the top down. There is a lot of infighting and a lot of resignations at county board level. We have a centre of excellence that is at a standstill. The keys should be handed over on 1 June and that is not going to happen. There are a lot of problems there and Kevin Walsh's results over the last two years have gone unnoticed because of this infighting. He hasn't been held accountable to this. We got to a Connacht final last year but we're papering over the cracks. There are players there that deserve better quality of training and management and I think going forward Kevin should make the right decision for the sake of Sligo football and not anybody else.

Then O'Hara called Walsh "crazy."

Kevin Walsh came at the start of the year and he decided that he wanted full commitment from everybody from 1 November. He was asking players for commitment and a big commitment at that stage but he hadn't accepted the Sligo manager role at that stage. There were reports he had shown interest in the Roscommon job and he was waiting for that to come through, in terms of would he get it, or would he get an interview. For me, he was asking me at 37 years of age to commit to a training regime of four nights a week collective sessions on 1 November, it was crazy as far as I was concerned. Unfortunately work and everything else conspired against me committing to that and I said I would be available from 1 January. [...] Kevin Walsh made big calls this year and last year. Every one of them has come back to backfire against him. For me I think he lost the players throughout the year. [...] But they deserve better training sessions. They deserve better quality in terms of tactical awareness and stuff like that and that hasn't come. Kevin Walsh has a lot to answer for.

Former Armagh footballer Oisín McConville said O'Hara was out of line with his outburst and pointed out that most teams, apart from those to have played in that year's All-Ireland final, go back training in November. Following defeat to Derry in the next game and elimination from the Championship, Walsh resigned as Sligo boss.

=== Galway ===
After the resignation of Alan Mulholland, Walsh was selected as favourite to replace him as manager. Pete Warren was also in the race but withdrew soon afterwards. In September 2014, Walsh was appointed as the Galway Senior Football Manager. On 3 September 2019, Walsh stepped down as manager after five years in charge.

With the onset of the COVID-19 pandemic, Walsh set to the production of his autobiography, which he titled The Invisible Game, and was helped by another man to write it.

=== Cork ===
In November 2022, Walsh was announced as coach of the Cork senior footballers, working under the management of John Cleary. He was still involved with the Cork team heading into the 2024 GAA season.

== See also ==
- Brian Walsh (politician)
- Joseph Walsh (archbishop of Tuam)
- Martin Walsh (police officer)

Sporting positions
Preceded by Tommy Jordan	Sligo Senior Football Manager; 2008–2013	Succeeded by Pat Flanagan
Preceded by Alan Mulholland	Galway Senior Football Manager; 2014–2019	Succeeded by Pádraic Joyce
