= Gay McManus =

Irish Gaelic footballer

Personal information
- Native name: Gaibriél Mac Mánais (Irish)
- Born: 28 March 1958 (age 68) Milltown, County Galway, Ireland
- Occupation: Retired Secondary School Principal
- Height: 5 ft 11 in (180 cm)

Sport
- Sport: Gaelic Football
- Position: Full-forward
Club
Years	Club	Apps (scores)
1974-1994	Milltown	54 (6-143)
Club titles
- Galway titles: 1
College
- Years: College
- UCG
College titles
- Sigerson titles: 2
Inter-county*
Years	County	Apps (scores)
1976-1989	Galway	30 (3-76)
Inter-county titles
- Connacht titles: 5
- NFL: 1
- *Inter County team apps and scores correct as of 17:54, 23 October 2016.

Gabriel "Gay" McManus (born 28 March 1958) is an Irish former Gaelic footballer. His league and championship career with the Galway senior team spanned thirteen seasons from 1976 until 1989. He played his club football with Milltown.

McManus won his first All-Ireland medal as a part of the Galway Minor team that beat Cork in the 1976 final. He followed this with a Sigerson Cup win with UCG in 1979/80. He won the university title again the following year in 1980/81 as Captain, as well as finishing as Top Scorer and winning the Player of The Tournament Award. McManus joined the Galway senior team during the 1976/77 National League campaign, making his Championship debut in 1977, aged 19. He won a National Football League with Galway in 1981, scoring a goal in the final. McManus was also a part of the Galway team that were beaten by Dublin in the 1983 All-Ireland Senior Football Championship Final.

== Inter-County Career ==
=== Minor and Under-21 ===
Gay McManus began his football career with Galway playing at full-forward for the Minor team who were defeated in the Connacht final of 1975. He was still eligible for the minor grade the following year, playing an integral role in helping Galway to go all the way to winning Connacht and All-Ireland minor glory, defeating Cork in the All-Ireland final on a scoreline of 1-10 to 0-6.

McManus' next underage success with Galway came with the Under-21 team in 1979. McManus was the difference for Galway that day scoring 0-7 from full-forward as Galway defeated Sligo 0-12 to 0-9. Galway would be defeated by eventual champions Down in the All-Ireland semi-final.

=== Senior ===
McManus made his senior debut for Galway in the 1976/77 season of the National Football League, just off the back of his All-Ireland Minor success. In 1977, he made his championship debut aged just 19 as Galway would go as far as the Connacht final. Despite McManus doing well for Galway on the frees, they were narrowly beaten by Roscommon on a scoreline of 1-12 to 2-08. Mcmanus and Galway would fall short to Roscommon again the following year on a scoreline of 2-07 to 0-09. Galway wouldn't reach the Connacht final again for another 4 years.

McManus won his first piece of silverware with the Galway senior team following victory over Roscommon in the 1980/81 National Football League Final, Galway running out victors 1-11 to 1-03, McManus providing a great goal for Galway.

1982 saw McManus take the helm of the Galway captaincy after he and his club, Milltown won the 1981 Galway Senior Football Championship. McManus would go on to lead Galway to their first Connacht title win in six years as Galway defeated Mayo 3-17 to 0-10. Galway were defeated by eventual champions Offaly in the All-Ireland Semi-Final.

In 1983, Galway retained their Connacht crown, beating Mayo in the final 1-13 to 1-10. Galway would go on to play Dublin in the 1983 All-Ireland Senior Football Championship Final, the infamous 'Game of Shame'. Galway had one player dismissed, as Dublin had three more. Amazingly, Dublin's 'Dirty Dozen' managed to hold off Galway's attack and win the ill-tempered game 1-10 to 1-08. The game would go down in history as one of the most memorable All-Ireland finals.

Galway would bounce back from their All-Ireland defeat of 1983, going on to reach the final of the 1983/84 NFL, but would fall short to Kerry 1-11 to 0-11. The Tribesmen would make it three Connacht titles in a row in 1984, overcoming Mayo in the final, 2-13 to 2-09. In the All-Ireland semi-final, they would face Kerry again and unfortunately would lose again to the eventual All-Ireland champions.

Galway failed to reach the Connacht final in 1985 but would make up for it in 1986, going all the way to beat Roscommon 1-08 to 1-05 in the final. Unfortunately, Galway would bow out at the semi-final stage once again, this time to Tyrone 1-12 to 1-09.

Galway won the Connacht championship in 1987 by the smallest of margins, beating Mayo 0-08 to 0-07. In the All-Ireland semi final Galway were minutes away from winning as they led against Cork by a point. However a converted Larry Tompkins free-kick outside the forty-five meant that the sides would have to meet again. Unfortunately, it wasn't Galway's day in the replay as they were simply outclassed by Cork, 0-18 to 1-04.

After Galway failed to reach Connacht finals in 1988 and 1989, it was now high time for McManus to finish up his career after thirteen seasons. Gay McManus was an integral part of Galway's dominance in Connacht in the 1980s. From captaining the side in 1982 to leading from the front as Galway's top scorer on many occasions, he is undeniably one of the best forwards of that era. In 2020, he was selected as one of the twenty greatest Galway players of the last fifty years by the Irish Independent.

== Club ==
Gay McManus made his senior championship debut for the Milltown senior team as a sixteen year old in 1974. He would play championship football for Milltown for twenty years before retiring in 1994. In that time, he would play in four county finals in 1978, 1981, 1986 and 1987. Unfortunately, Milltown only won one of them four county finals, in 1981. On that day they defeated St. Grellan's, Ballinasloe 0-11 to 2-3. In a man of the match performance, McManus scored nine of Milltown's eleven points.

== Honours ==
Milltown

- Galway Senior Football Championship : (1) 1981
  - Runner-up : (3) 1978, 1986, 1987

Galway

- Connacht Minor Football Championship : (1) 1976
  - Runner-up : (1) 1975
- All-Ireland Minor Football Championship : (1) 1976
- Connacht Under-21 Football Championship : (1) 1979
  - Runner-up : (1) 1978
- National Football League : (1) 1980-81
- Connacht Senior Football Championship : (5) 1982 (capt.), 1983, 1984, 1986, 1987
  - Runner-up : (2) 1977, 1978

UCG

- Sigerson Cup : (2) 1979/80, 1980/81 (capt.)
  - Runner-up: (3) 1976/77, 1977/78, 1978/79
- Hodges Figgis Trophy : (1) 1981 (capt.)
  - Runner-up : (1) 1980

Sporting positions
Preceded by	Galway Senior Football Captain; 1982	Succeeded by Séamus McHugh
