= Brian O'Donnell (Gaelic footballer) =

Gaelic footballer

Personal information
- Native name: Brian Ó Dónaill (Irish)
- Born: 5 June 1960 (age 66) Clonmel, Ireland
- Occupation: Health service official
- Height: 6 ft 0 in (183 cm)

Sport
- Sport: Gaelic Football
- Position: Left Half Forward
Club
- Years: Club
- Mervue
College
- Years: College
- University College Galway
College titles
- Sigerson titles: 3
Inter-county*
| Years | County | Apps (scores) |
| 1979–1989 | Galway | 22 (3-26) |
Inter-county titles
- Connacht titles: 5
- All-Irelands: 0
- NFL: 1
- All Stars: 0
- *Inter County team apps and scores correct as of 17:54, 21 January 2018.

Brian O'Donnell (born 5 June 1960) is an Irish retired footballer, rugby union player and Gaelic footballer. His league and championship career with the Galway senior team lasted eleven seasons from 1979 until 1989.

Born in Galway, O'Donnell was a sports all-rounder in his younger years. As an association football with Mervue United, he earned a place on the Irish Youths football team in 1978. O'Donnell also lined out for the Galwegians rugby team and was capped 12 times by Connacht.

O'Donnell made his debut on the inter-county scene at the age of seventeen when he was selected for the Galway minor team. He enjoyed one championship season with the minor team, however, he was a Connacht runner-up. O'Donnell subsequently joined the Galway under-21 team, winning Connacht medals in 1979 and 1981. By this stage he had also joined the Galway senior team, making his debut during the 1979 championship. Over the course of the following decade, O'Donnell won five Connacht medals and one National Football League medal. He was an All-Ireland runner-up in 1983. O'Donnell played his last game for Galway in July 1989.

O'Donnell was also selected on the Conancht inter-provincial team, however, he ended his career without a Railway Cup medal.

In 1984 O'Donnell was selected on the Ireland team for the inaugural International Rules Series.

== Honours ==
University College Galway

- Sigerson Cup (3): 1981, 1983, 1984

Galway

- Connacht Senior Football Championship (5): 1982, 1983, 1984, 1986, 1987
- National Football League (1): 1980-81
- Connacht Under-21 Football Championship (2): 1979, 1981
