= Alan Mulholland =

Galway Gaelic footballer and manager

Personal information
- Born: 1968 (age 57–58) Galway, Ireland
- Occupation: Bookmaker
- Height: 1.83 m (6 ft 0 in)

Sport
- Sport: Gaelic football
- Position: Centre back
Club
- Years: Club
- 1985–2002: Salthill–Knocknacarra
Club titles
- Galway titles: 1
- Connacht titles: 1
Inter-county
- Years: County
- 1987–1997: Galway
Inter-county titles
- Connacht titles: 2

Alan Mulholland (born 1968) is an Irish Gaelic football former manager and player. He was manager of the senior Galway county team from 2011 until 2014, having previously been manager of the minor and under-21 teams.

In 2007, Mulholland guided Galway to the All-Ireland Minor Football Championship, defeating Derry, as well as guiding them to the U21 Final in which they defeated Cavan in May 2011. On 3 October 2011, Mulholland was appointed as manager of the Galway senior football team, replacing Tomás Ó Flatharta.

As of 2023, Mulholland had a role as development committee chairman of his club.

Sporting positions
Preceded by Tomás Ó Flatharta	Galway Senior Football Manager; 2011–2014	Succeeded by Kevin Walsh
Preceded by ?	Galway Under-21 Football Manager; 2010–2011	Succeeded by Gerry Fahy
