= Niall Finnegan =

Galway Gaelic footballer

Personal information
- Native name: Niall Ó Fionnagáin (Irish)
- Nickname: Finny
- Born: 16 January 1971 (age 55) Galway, Ireland
- Occupation: Solicitor
- Height: 5 ft 11 in (180 cm)

Sport
- Sport: Gaelic Football
- Position: Left Half Forward
Clubs
- Years: Club
- Salthill–Knocknacarra; St Sylvester's
Club titles
- Dublin titles: 1
College
- Years: College
- UCG
College titles
- Sigerson titles: 1
Inter-county*
Years	County	Apps (scores)
1991–2001	Galway	27 (2–84)
Inter-county titles
- Connacht titles: 3
- All-Irelands: 1
- NFL: 0
- All Stars: 0
- *Inter County team apps and scores correct as of 20:54, 15 November 2016.

Niall Finnegan (born 1971) is an Irish former Gaelic footballer. His league and championship career with the Galway senior team spanned ten seasons from 1991 until 2001.

== Career statistics ==
Team	Season	Connacht		All-Ireland		Total	
Team	Season	Apps	Score	Apps	Score	Apps	Score
Galway	1992	0	0-00	0	0-00	0	0-00
Galway	1993	0	0-00	0	0-00	0	0-00
Galway	1994	3	0-01	0	0-00	3	0-01
Galway	1995	4	0-15	1	0-07	5	0-22
Galway	1996	4	1-11	0	0-00	4	1-11
Galway	1997	1	0-09	0	0-00	1	0-09
Galway	1998	4	1-13	2	0-05	6	1-18
Galway	1999	3	0-08	0	0-00	3	0-08
Galway	2000	3	0-10	2	0-05	5	0-15
Total		22	2-67	5	0-17	27	2-84

== Honours ==
Galway

- All-Ireland Senior Football Championship (1): 1998
- Connacht Senior Football Championship (3): 1995, 1998, 2000
