= Stephen Kinneavy =

Galway Gaelic footballer

Stephen Kinneavy (born 23 November 1954) is an Irish former Gaelic footballer who played as a full-back at senior level for the Galway county team.

== Honours ==
Galway

- Connacht Senior Football Championship (3): 1982, 1983, 1984
