= Pat O'Neill (Galway footballer) =

Irish Gaelic footballer

Patrick O'Neill
Personal information
- Born: 2 March 1956 (age 70)

Sport
- Sport: Gaelic football
- Position: Right wing-back
Club
- Years: Club
- Tuam Stars
Club titles
- Galway titles: 3

Patrick O'Neill (born 2 March 1956) is an Irish former Gaelic footballer who played as a right wing-back with the senior Galway county team.

== Honours ==
Tuam Stars

- Galway Senior Football Championship (3): 1984, 1988, 1989

Galway

- Connacht Senior Football Championship (3): 1982, 1983, 1984
- National Football League (1): 1980–81
