= Barry Brennan (Galway footballer) =

Galway Gaelic footballer

Barry Brennan (born 20 October 1958) is an Irish former Gaelic footballer who played as a right wing-forward at senior level for the Galway county team. He won an All Star in 1981.

== Honours ==
St Grellan's

- Connacht Senior Club Football Championship (1): 1979
- Galway Senior Football Championship (2): 1979, 1980

Galway

- Connacht Senior Football Championship (5): 1982, 1983, 1984, 1986, 1987
- National Football League (1): 1980-81 (c)

Sporting positions
Preceded by Billy Joyce	Galway Senior Football Captain; 1980	Succeeded by
