= Damien Burke =

Irish Gaelic footballer

Personal information
- Native name: Damien de Búrca (Irish)
- Born: Galway, Ireland
- Occupation: Transport Engineer
- Height: 1.83 m (6 ft 0 in)

Sport
- Sport: Gaelic Football
- Position: Left Corner Back
Club
- Years: Club
- 2002–2014: Corofin
Club titles
- Galway titles: 6
- Connacht titles: 2
Inter-county
- Years: County
- 2004–2012: Galway
Inter-county titles
- Connacht titles: 2

Damien Burke is a former Gaelic footballer from Corofin, County Galway. He played with his local club Corofin and the Galway senior team from 2004 until 2012.
