= Richie Lee =

Irish Gaelic footballer

Richard Lee
Personal information
- Born: 2 September 1959 (age 67)

Sport
- Sport: Gaelic football
Club
- Years: Club
- Moycullen

Richard Lee (born 2 September 1959) is an Irish retired Gaelic footballer who played as a midfielder with the Galway senior team.

== Honours ==
Galway

- Connacht Senior Football Championship (3): 1982, 1983, 1984
