= Val Daly =

Galway Gaelic footballer and manager

Personal information
- Born: 19 September 1962 (age 64) Galway, Ireland
- Occupation: Forester
- Height: 6 ft 0 in (183 cm)

Sport
- Sport: Gaelic football
- Position: Centre forward
Club
- Years: Club
- Mountbellew–Moylough
Club titles
- Galway titles: 1
Inter-county
| Years | County | Apps (scores) |
| 1981–1997 | Galway | ? (5–60) |
Inter-county titles
- Connacht titles: 5
- All-Irelands: 0
- NFL: 0
- All Stars: 2

Val Daly is an Irish Gaelic football manager and former player.

Originally from Mountbellew, Daly made his debut with the county side in the 1981 National League and played until the 1997 Championship season when he was player manager.

An All-Star in 1987 and 1990, Daly won five Connacht Senior Football Championship titles. As well as managing the Galway football team between 1996 and 1997, he was also appointed temporary manager of the Roscommon county football team in 2005, after the resignation of Tommy Carr from the post.

He is currently manager of his own club side Mountbellew–Moylough in the Galway Senior Football Championship.

His sons John and Michael Daly also played for Galway.
