= John Divilly =

Galway Gaelic footballer

Personal information
- Nickname: John Delivery
- Occupation: Coach

Sport
- Sport: Gaelic football
- Position: Centre Back
Club
- Years: Club
- Kilkerrin-Clonberne
Inter-county
- Years: County
- Galway; Kildare
Inter-county titles
- All-Irelands: 1

John Divilly is a former Gaelic footballer who played for the Kilkerrin-Clonberne club. He won the All-Ireland in 1998 and was one of the main players interviewed in the documentary A Year Til Sunday, which used hidden cameras to tell the story of Galway's journey to winning the All-Ireland Football Championship in 1998. He is the manager of the NUIM Sigerson Cup team which was victorious over UUJ in February 2010.

He was appointed selector and backs coach of the Galway senior football team in October 2019, hoping to lead them to their first All Ireland since 2001.

He was a columnist for the Irish Examiner between 2017 and 2021.
