= Peter Lee (Gaelic footballer) =

Irish Gaelic footballer

Peter Lee (born 14 October 1955) is an Irish retired Gaelic footballer who played as a centre-back with the Galway senior team.

== Honours ==
Galway

- Connacht Senior Football Championship (2): 1983, 1984
- National Football League (1): 1980-81
