= 1998 All-Ireland Senior Football Championship final =

- Event: 1998 All-Ireland Senior Football Championship
Galway	Kildare
1–14 (17)	1–10 (13)
- Date: 27 September 1998
- Venue: Croke Park, Dublin
- Man of the Match: Michael Donnellan
- Referee: John Bannon (Longford)
- Attendance: 65,886
- Weather: Dry

The 1998 All-Ireland Senior Football Championship Championship final was the 111th All-Ireland Final and the deciding match of the 1998 All-Ireland Senior Football Championship, an inter-county Gaelic football tournament for the top teams in Ireland.

In 2018, Martin Breheny listed this as the third greatest All-Ireland Senior Football Championship Final.

== Background ==
This was Kildare's first appearance in an All-Ireland football final since 1935. They were assisted on their way there by a semi-final victory over Kerry, masterminded by Kerryman Mick O'Dwyer. Going into the final Kildare were favourites to beat Galway.

Kildare were marginal favourites to take the title after dethroning reigning champions Kerry in a tight and close game. As well as dethroning the reigning champions, Kildare had also defeated Meath and Dublin, the 1996 and 1995 champions respectively. Galway were never in danger of losing against Derry in the semi-final and won a five-points victory in the end.

== Match ==
This year's final was played on 27 September.

=== Summary ===
Galway defeated Kildare by a scoreline of 1–14 to 1–10. They took their first Sam Maguire Cup in 32 years – since the 1966 team completed a three-in-a-row for the county.

Like in their semi-final against Derry, Galway started well and had three unanswered points on the board by the 13th minute, one of which saw Michael Donnellan race towards the Kildare at great speed before taking his point. Kildare got their first score through Eddie McCormack In the 20th minute, Kildare took the lead, after Dermot Earley scored a goal.

In response, Michael Donnellan galvanised his team with a moment of GAA magic. From his own defence, he proceeded to charge up the field at lightning pace, exchanging a pass with Kevin Walsh in midfield. The ball found its way to Seán Óg De Paor who finished the move with a well-taken point. It was a score that quelled a potential run of scores for the Lilywhites. At the interval, the score was 1–5 to 0–5 in favour of Kildare.

After the restart, Ja Fallon sniped a point off the arrears before Pádraic Joyce struck with a wonderful goal where he rounded goalkeeper Christy Byrne before finishing in front of an empty net. Galway had regained the lead and would never surrender it until the final whistle. By the 50th minute, it was 1–11 to 1–6 to Galway. Kildare managed to cut the lead to three before injury time but Galway had the final score, courtesy of De Paor to give them their first title in 32 years.

=== Details ===
27 September 1998
15:30 IST (UTC+1)

Galway	1–14 – 1–10	Kildare
Pádraic Joyce 1–2 (0–1f), Niall Finnegan 0–4 (0–2f), Jarlath Fallon 0–3 (0–1 sideline), Seán Óg de Paor 0–2, Michael Donnellan 0–2, Seán Ó Domhnaill 0–1	Report	Dermot Earley 1–1, Pádraig Brennan 0–3 (0–2f), Eddie McCormack 0–2, Karl O'Dwyer 0–2, Declan Kerrigan 0–1, Niall Buckley 0–1

Croke Park, Dublin
Attendance: 65,886
Referee: John Bannon (Longford)

Galway	Kildare

1	Martin McNamara
2	Tomás Meehan
3	Gary Fahey
4	Tomás Mannion
5	Ray Silke (c)
6	John Divilly
7	Seán Óg de Paor
8	Kevin Walsh
9	Seán Ó Domhnaill
10	Michael Donnellan
11	Jarlath Fallon
12	Shay Walsh	(substituted off) 66'
13	Derek Savage
14	Pádraic Joyce
15	Niall Finnegan
Substitutes:
16	Pat Comer
17	Brian Silke
18	Richie Fahey
19	Kevin Fallon
20	Damien Mitchell
21	Paul Clancy	(substituted on) 66'
22	Declan Meehan
23	Tommy Joyce
24	Fergal Gavin
Manager:
John O'Mahony

1	Christy Byrne
2	Brian Lacey
17	Seamus Dowling
4	Ken Doyle
5	John Finn
6	Glenn Ryan (c)
7	Anthony Rainbow
8	Niall Buckley
9	Willie McCreery
10	Eddie McCormack
11	Declan Kerrigan
12	Dermot Earley
13	Martin Lynch	(substituted off) 58'
14	Karl O'Dwyer
15	Pádraig Graven	(substituted off) 45'
Substitutes:
16	Paul Flood
3	Ronan Quinn
18	Davy Dalton
19	Bryan Murphy	(substituted on) 58'
20	Pádraig Brennan	(substituted on) 45'
21	Martin Ryan
22	Paul McCormack
23	Derek Maher
24	Noel Donlon
Manager:
Mick O'Dwyer

== Post-match ==
Kildare lost against Offaly in the first round of the following year's Leinster championship and then were relegated from the National League Division 1, but won the Leinster Title again in 2000 before losing again to Galway in the All-Ireland semi-final.

Galway lost the following years Connacht final to Mayo. They reclaimed the Connacht & All-Ireland Title again in 2001, after losing to Kerry in the 2000 final after a replay. Michael Donnellan's run from defence culminating in a Seán Óg De Paor point was voted #1 in the 2005 TV programme Top 20 GAA Moments.
