= 2003 Ulster Senior Football Championship =

Gaelic football tournament

2003 Ulster SFC
Tournament details
- Province: Ulster
- Year: 2003
- Trophy: Anglo-Celt Cup
- Date: 11 May 2003 - 20 July 2003
- Teams: 9
- Defending champions: Armagh

Winners
- Champions: Tyrone (10th win)
- Manager: Mickey Harte
- Captain: Peter Canavan

Runners-up
- Runners-up: Down
- Manager: Paddy O'Rourke
- Captain: Sean Ward

Other
- Matches played: 10

The 2003 Ulster Senior Football Championship was the 115th instalment of the annual Ulster Senior Football Championship organised by Ulster GAA. It was one of the four provincial competitions of the 2003 All-Ireland Senior Football Championship.

Tyrone won their 10th title overall and their first title since 2001. Armagh, the defending Ulster and All-Ireland Champions were eliminated by Monaghan in the preliminary round.

== Teams ==
Nine counties competed in the Ulster Senior Football Championship:

County	Last Championship Title	Last All-Ireland Title	Position in 2000 Championship	Sponsor
Antrim	1951	—	Quarter-finals	Bushmills
Armagh	2002	2002	Champions	Morgan Fuels
Cavan	1997	1952	Preliminary Round	Kingspan
Derry	1998	1993	Semi-finals	Sperrin Galvanisers
Donegal	1992	1992	Runners-Up	Abbey Hotel
Down	1994	1994	Quarter-finals	Canal Court Hotel
Fermanagh	—	—	Quarter-finals	Tracey Concrete
Monaghan	1988	—	Semi-finals	Harte Peat
Tyrone	2001	—	Quarter-finals	W.J. Dolan

== Championship draw ==
Preliminary round
Armagh	0-09
Monaghan	0-13

Quarter-finals
Cavan	1-10
Antrim	2-09
Derry	1-05
Tyrone	0-17
Monaghan	0-13
Down	1-12
Fermanagh	0-10
Donegal	0-06

Semi-finals
Antrim	1-09
Tyrone	1-17
Down	2-10
Fermanagh	0-11

Final
Tyrone	0-23
Down	1-05

== Preliminary round ==
11 May 2003 Preliminary round	Monaghan	0-13 - 0-9	Armagh	St. Tiernach's Park, Clones
	P Finlay 0-8, R Ronaghan 0-2, N Corrigan 0-1, T Freeman 0-1, M Slowey 0-1.		D Marsden 0-2, S McDonnell 0-2, P Loughran 0-2, P McKeever 0-2, T McEntee 0-1.	Referee: M Curley (Galway)

== Quarter-finals ==
18 May 2003 Quarter-final	Derry	1-9 - 0-12	Tyrone	St. Tiernach's Park, Clones
	P Bradley 1-6, E Muldoon 0-2, P McFlynn 0-1.		P Canavan 0-6, B Dooher 0-3, S O’Neill 0-1, G Cavlan 0-1, K Hughes 0-1.	Referee: P McEneaney (Monaghan)

24 May 2003 Quarter-final replay	Tyrone	0-17 - 1-5	Derry	Casement Park, Belfast
	P Canavan 0-8, S Cavanagh 0-3, B McGuigan 0-2, C Lawn 0-1, D McCrossan 0-1, G Cavlan 0-1, P Horisk 0-1.		G McGonigle 1-3, K McCloy 0-1, P Bradley 0-1.	Referee: M Curley (Galway)

25 May 2003 Quarter-final	Antrim	2-9 - 1-10	Cavan	Casement Park, Belfast
	D O’Hare 2-0, K Madden 0-5, K McGourty 0-2, J Quinn 0-1, S Kelly 0-1.		D McCabe 1-5, M McKeever 0-1, L Reilly 0-1, F O’Reilly 0-1, S Brady 0-1, P Smith 0-1.	Referee: M Monaghan (Kildare)

1 June 2003 Quarter-final	Fermanagh	0-10 - 0-6	Donegal	Brewster Park, Enniskillen
	Raymond Gallagher 0-4, R McCabe 0-4, S Maguire 0-2.		A Sweeney 0-4, C McFadden 0-1, B Roper 0-1.	Referee: S McCormack (Meath)

8 June 2003 Quarter-final	Down	1-12 - 0-13	Monaghan	Casement Park, Belfast
	L Doyle 0-4, M Walsh 1-0, G McCartan 0-3, J Lavery 0-2, C McCrickard 0-1, J McCartan 0-1, R Murtagh 0-1.		P Finlay 0-7, J Hughes 0-1, T Freeman 0-1, M Slowey 0-1, R Ronaghan 0-1, R Woods 0-1, A Rooney 0-1.	Referee: E Murtagh (Longford)

== Semi-finals ==
15 June 2003 Semi-final	Tyrone	1-17 - 1-9	Antrim	Casement Park, Belfast
	P Canavan 0-7, E Mulligan 1-3, M Harte 0-3, S O’Neill 0-2, D McCrossan 0-1, G Cavlan 0-1.		K Madden 1-5, K Brady 0-1, G Adams 0-1, D O’Hare 0-1, R O’Loan 0-1.	Referee: G Kinneavy (Roscommon)

22 June 2003 Semi-final	Down	2-10 - 0-11	Fermanagh	St. Tiernach's Park, Clones
	G McCartan 1-4, J McCartan 1-0, L Doyle 0-3, B Coulter 0-1, C McCrickard 0-1, R Murtagh 0-1.		Raymie Gallagher 0-4, R McCabe 0-3, R Keenan 0-2, S Maguire 0-1, C Bradley 0-1.	Referee: M Monaghan (Kildare)

== Finals ==
13 July 2003 Final	Tyrone	1-17 - 4-8	Down	St. Tiernach's Park, Clones
	P Canavan 1-6, E Mulligan 0-3, S Cavanagh 0-2, B Dooher 0-1, B McGuigan 0-1, K Hughes 0-1, C Gormley 0-1, P Jordan 0-1, C Gourley 0-1.		D Gordon 2-1, L Doyle 1-4, B Coulter 1-1, G McCartan 0-1, B Burns 0-1.	Referee: A Mangan (Kerry)

20 July 2003 Final replay	Tyrone	0-23 - 1-5	Down	St. Tiernach's Park, Clones
	P Canavan 0-11 (7f, 1’45’), E Mulligan 0-4, K Hughes 0-2, R McMenamin 0-1, C Gormley 0-1, S Cavanagh 0-1, B Dooher 0-1, G Cavlan 0-1, F McGuigan 0-1.		L Doyle 0-4 (3f), R Murtagh 1-0, B Coulter 0-1.	Referee: B White (Wexford)

== See also ==
- 2003 All-Ireland Senior Football Championship
