= 2002 Ulster Senior Football Championship =

Gaelic football tournament

2002 Ulster SFC
Tournament details
- Province: Ulster
- Year: 2002
- Trophy: Anglo-Celt Cup
- Date: 12 May 2002 - 7 July 2002
- Teams: 9
- Defending champions: Tyrone

Winners
- Champions: Armagh (10th win)
- Manager: Joe Kernan
- Captain: Kieran McGeeney

Runners-up
- Runners-up: Donegal
- Manager: Mickey Moran
- Captain: Michael Hegarty

Other
- Matches played: 9

The 2002 Ulster Senior Football Championship was the 114th installment of the annual Ulster Senior Football Championship organised by Ulster GAA. It was one of the four provincial competitions of the 2002 All-Ireland Senior Football Championship.

Armagh won their 10th title overall and their third in four years by beating Donegal 1–14 to 1–10 in the final on 7 July.

== Teams ==
=== General Information ===
Nine counties competed in the Ulster Senior Football Championship:

County	Last Championship Title	Last All-Ireland Title	Position in 2000 Championship	Sponsor
Antrim	1951	—	Quarter-finals	Bushmills
Armagh	2000	—	Quarter-finals	Morgan Fuels
Cavan	1997	1952	Runners-Up	Kingspan
Derry	1998	1993	Semi-finals	Sperrin Galvanisers
Donegal	1992	1992	Preliminary Round	Abbey Hotel
Down	1994	1994	Quarter-finals	Canal Court Hotel
Fermanagh	—	—	Quarter-finals	Tracey Concrete
Monaghan	1988	—	Semi-finals	Harte Peat
Tyrone	2001	—	Champions	W.J. Dolan

== Championship Draw ==
Preliminary round
Cavan	0-15
Donegal	1-17

Quarter-finals
Monaghan	2-18
Fermanagh	4-13
Tyrone	0-16
Armagh	2-13
Down	1-06
Donegal	3-12
Antrim	0-06
Derry	0-16

Semi-finals
Fermanagh	1-05
Armagh	0-16
Donegal	1-09
Derry	0-10

Final
Armagh	1-14
Donegal	1-10

== Preliminary round ==
12 May 2002 Preliminary round	Cavan	0-15 - 1-17	Donegal	Breffni Park, Cavan
	G Pearson 0-10, A Forde 0-2, L Reilly 0-1, P Reilly 0-1, B McCrudden 0-1.		B Devenney 0-7, A Sweeney 0-5, B Roper 1-0, M Hegarty 0-3, J McGuinness 0-1, K Cassidey 0-1.	Attendance: 15,000; Referee: P Russell (Tipperary)

== Quarter-finals ==
12 May 2002 Quarter-final	Monaghan	2-11 - 4-13	Fermanagh	St Tiernach's Park, Clones
	T Freeman 1-3, D Freeman 0-4, R Woods 1-0, JP Mone 0-3, J McElroy 0-1.		Rory Gallagher 3-9, T Brewster 1-0, S McDermott 0-1, R Johnston 0-1, Raymond Gallagher 0-1, M McGrath 0-1.	Referee: M Monaghan (Kildare)

19 May 2002 Quarter-final	Armagh	1-12 - 1-12	Tyrone	St Tiernach's Park, Clones
	O McConville 0-7, S McDonnell 1-1, R Clarke 0-2, J McEntee 0-1, P McKeever 0-1.		S Kavanagh 1-2, P Canavan 0-4, K Hughes 0-2, R McMenamin 0-2, S O'Neill 0-1, D McCrossan 0-1.	Attendance: 31,937; Referee: J Bannon (Longford)

26 May 2002 Quarter-final replay	Armagh	2-13 - 0-16	Tyrone	St Tiernach's Park, Clones
	P McKeever 0-5, J McEntee 1-1, B Duffy 1-0, O McConville 0-3, S McDonnell 0-2, R Clarke 0-1, D Marsden 0-1.		S O'Neill 0-7, K Hughes 0-2, S Cavanagh 0-2, C McAnallen 0-2, R McMenamin 0-1, B McGuigan 0-1, D McCrossan 0-1.	Attendance: 30,158; Referee: B White (Wexford)

2 June 2002 Quarter-final	Antrim	0-6 - 0-16	Derry	Casement Park, Belfast
	P Logan 0-2, M McCrory 0-1, P McCann 0-1, K Brady 0-1, K Madden 0-1.		G Diamond 0-6, P Bradley 0-5, E. Muldoon 0-2, P McFlynn 0-1, G McGonigle 0-1, J McBride 0-1.	Referee: P Horan (Offaly)

2 June 2002 Quarter-final	Donegal	3-12 - 1-6	Down	MacCumhaill Park, Ballybofey
	A Sweeney 1-5, B Devenney 1-4, B Roper 1-1, J Gildea 0-1, J McGuinness 0-1.		J McCartan 1-0, M Linden 0-2, R Murtagh 0-1, R Sexton 0-1, S King 0-1, B Coulter 0-1.	Attendance: 8,000; Referee: G Kinneavey (Roscommon)

== Semi-finals ==
9 June 2002 Semi-final	Armagh	0-16 - 1-5	Fermanagh	St Tiernach's Park, Clones
	O McConville 0-5, D Marsden 0-3, S McDonnell 0-2, P McGrane 0-2, R Clarke 0-1, C O'Rourke 0-1, B O'Hagan 0-1, P McKeever 0-1.		Rory Gallagher 1-3, Raymond Gallagher 0-1, T Brewster 0-1.	Attendance: 20,540; Referee: P Russell (Tipperary)

16 June 2002 Semi-final	Donegal	1-9 - 0-10	Derry	St Tiernach's Park, Clones
	A Sweeney 1-3, C Toye 0-2, B Roper 0-1, J McGuinness 0-1, P McGonigle 0-1, B Devenney 0-1.		G Diamond 0-4, P Bradley 0-3, A Tohill 0-1, J McBride 0-1, E. Muldoon 0-1.	Attendance: 4,000; Referee: M Collins (Cork)

== Final ==
7 July 2002 Final	Armagh	1-14 - 1-10	Donegal	St Tiernach's Park, Clones
	O McConville 0-5, J McEntee 1-0, S McDonnell 0-3, R Clarke 0-3, D Marsden 0-1, P McGrane 0-1, A O'Rourke 0-1.		A Sweeney 0-4, J McGuinness 1-0, B Devenney 0-3, C Toye 0-2, P McGonigle 0-1.	Attendance: 30,219; Referee: S McCormack (Meath)

== See also ==
- 2002 All-Ireland Senior Football Championship
