= Martin Lynch (Gaelic footballer) =

Irish Gaelic footballer

Personal information
- Native name: Máirtín Ó Loingsigh (Irish)
- Born: 17 June 1970 (age 56) Clane, County Kildare, Ireland
- Occupation: Primary school principal
- Height: 6 ft 2 in (188 cm)

Sport
- Sport: Gaelic football
- Position: Right corner-forward
Club
- Years: Club
- Clane
Club titles
- Kildare titles: 4
Inter-county
- Years: County
- 1988–2002: Kildare
Inter-county titles
- Leinster titles: 1
- All-Irelands: 0
- NFL: 0
- All Stars: 1

Martin Lynch (born 17 June 1970) is an Irish former Gaelic football player and selector who played for club side Clane. He scored 13–96 and made a combined 118 league and championship appearances with the Kildare senior football team.

== Career ==
Lynch first played Gaelic football at a competitive level under the stewardship of his father at the local national school in Clane. He later won an All-Ireland Colleges Championship with Scoil Mhuire. By this stage Lynch had made his inter-county debut as a member of the Kildare minor football team that won the Leinster MFC in 1987. He had just turned 18 when he made his senior debut in a National League game against Roscommon in October 1988. Lynch's was an All-Star recipient in 1991. He was part of the Clane club team that won four County Championships between 1991 and 1997. The latter part of his inter-county career saw Lynch line out in Kildare's defeat by Galway in the 1998 All-Ireland SFC final. He claimed two Leinster SFC titles before retiring from inter-county activity in 2002.

== Honours ==
Clane

- Kildare Senior Football Championship: 1991, 1992, 1995, 1997

Kildare

- Leinster Senior Football Championship: 1998, 2000
- Leinster Minor Football Championship: 1987

Awards

- All-Star: 1991
