= Sloyan =

Sloyan is a surname. Notable people with the surname include:

- Dessie Sloyan (born 1976), Irish Gaelic footballer
- James Sloyan (born 1940), American actor
- Kyaram Sloyan (1996–2016), Artsakh Defense Army soldier
- Samantha Sloyan (born 1979), American actress, daughter of James
