= 2001 All-Ireland Senior Football Championship =

Football championship

Championship details
- Dates: 6 May – 23 September 2001
- Teams: 32

All-Ireland Champions
- Winning team: Galway (9th win)
- Captain: Gary Fahey
- Manager: John O'Mahony

All-Ireland Finalists
- Losing team: Meath
- Captain: Trevor Giles
- Manager: Seán Boylan

Provincial Champions
- Munster: Kerry
- Leinster: Meath
- Ulster: Tyrone
- Connacht: Roscommon

Championship statistics
- No. matches played: 63
- Goals total: 122 (1.94 per game)
- Points total: 1490 (23.65 per game)
- Top Scorer: Pádraic Joyce (3–45)
- Player of the Year: Pádraic Joyce; Declan Meehan

The 2001 Bank of Ireland All-Ireland Senior Football Championship was the 115th staging of the All-Ireland Senior Football Championship, the Gaelic Athletic Association's premier inter-county Gaelic football tournament. The championship began on 6 May 2001 and ended on 23 September 2001.

The format of the championship saw the biggest change in over 100 years with the introduction of the All-Ireland qualifiers. This system saw teams who were defeated in the provincial championships enter a secondary championship and the chance to qualify for the All-Ireland series. The Leinster Championship abandoned its group stage and returned to a straight knockout system. London declined to field a team in the championship due to an outbreak of foot-and-mouth disease. They were initially scheduled to host Mayo at Ruislip on the last Sunday of May but Connacht council first postponed the fixture and then outright cancelled the game. The previous fixture between the teams was in 1996 and the next after was in 2006.

Kerry entered the championship as the defending champions, however, they were defeated by Meath in the All-Ireland semi-final.

On 23 September 2001, Galway won the championship following an 0–17 to 0–8 defeat of Meath in the All-Ireland final. This was their ninth All-Ireland title and their first in three championship seasons. The first year of the "back-door" system, as it popularly became known, appropriately finished with the first All-Ireland winner not to win a provincial title. Galway came through the Qualifiers after losing the Connacht Semi-final to Roscommon. They beat Wicklow, Armagh and Cork in the Qualifiers, followed by a win in the re-match with Roscommon in the All Ireland Quarter-final. Their semi-final guaranteed that at least one "back-door" team would contest the All-Ireland final as opponents Derry entered the Qualifiers in the second round alongside Galway after losing the Ulster semi-final to Tyrone.

Galway's Pádraic Joyce was the championship's top scorer with 3–45. He was also named as the Texaco Footballer of the Year, while Declan Meehan was chosen as the All Stars Footballer of the Year.

== Format ==
The provincial championships in Munster, Leinster, Ulster and Connacht ran as usual on a "knock-out" basis. But for the first time, these provincial games were then followed by the "Qualifier" system:

- Round 1 of the qualifiers included all the counties that did not qualify for the Provincial Semi-finals, except for New York. Sixteen teams were paired in an open draw.
- Round 2 consisted of the eight defeated teams in the Provincial Semi-finals playing against the eight winners from Round 1. A draw was made to determine the eight pairings.
- Round 3 consisted of the eight winners from Round 2 playing each other in an open draw format.
- Round 4 consisted of each of the four teams defeated in the Provincial Finals playing against the four winners from Round 3. A draw was made to determine the four pairings.

The Leinster football championship, previously held as a group stage before proceeding to knock-outs, returned to a straight knock-out format.

In the All-Ireland Quarter-finals, each of the four Provincial Champions played one of the four winners from Round 4. The All-Ireland Semi-final draw at this time was seeded on a provincial rotation schedule, initially determined by the Central Council. If a Provincial Championship winning team was defeated in its Quarter-final, the team that defeats it took its place in the semi-final.

== Provincial championships ==
=== Connacht Senior Football Championship ===
Due to an outbreak of foot and mouth disease in the UK, London did not take part in the Connacht Senior Football Championship in 2001. The Connacht Council decided to cancel their home Quarter-final game against Mayo.

Quarter-finals
New York	1–09
Roscommon	3–13
Leitrim	2–05
Galway	3–24

Semi-finals
Sligo	1–11
Mayo	1–12
Roscommon	2–12
Galway	0–14

Final
Mayo	1–12
Roscommon	2–10

Quarter-finals

19 May 2001 Quarter-final	Roscommon	3–13 – 1–9	New York	Dr. Hyde Park, Roscommon
	F Doolan 2–1, G Lohan 0–5, N Dineen 1–1, J Hanley 0–2, G Cox 0–2, M Ryan 0–1, F Greghan 0–1.		P Logheran 1–4, K Killy 0–2, P O’Connor 0–2, G O’Driscoll 0–1.	Referee: J McKee (Armagh)

20 May 2001 Quarter-final	Galway	3–24 – 3–5	Leitrim	Tuam Stadium, Tuam
	P Joyce 3–3, K Comer 0–4, J Bergin 0–3, T Joyce 0–3, A Kerins 0–2, K Walsh 0–2, D Savage 0–2, J Fallon 0–2, S Óg de Paor 0–1, S Ó Domhnaill 0–1, T Mannion 0–1.		S Canning 2–0, A Charles 1–0, P McLoughlin 0–3, J Guckian 0–1, P Kenny 0–1.	Referee: E Murtagh (Longford)

27 May 2001 Quarter-final	Mayo	w/o – scr.	London	Emerald GAA Grounds, Ruislip

Semi-finals

3 June 2001 Semi-final	Galway	0–14 – 2–12	Roscommon	Tuam Stadium, Tuam
	N Dineen 1–3 (2f), F Dolan 1–2, S O'Neill, S Lohan 0–2 each, D Gavin, P Noone, G Lohan (f) 0–1 each.		P Joyce 0–6 (2f), J Donnellan 0–3 (3f), M Donnellan, J Bergin, T Joyce, A Kerins, K Comer 0–1 each.	Referee: B Gorman (Armagh)

10 June 2001 Semi-final	Mayo	1–12 – 1–11	Sligo	MacHale Park, Castlebar
	M Sheridan 0–5 (3f 1 45), M McNicholas 0–4 (1 45), T Mallen 1–0, S Carolan 0–2, K McDonald 0–1.		D Sloyan 0–4 (2f), P Taylor 0–4 (3f), S Davey 1–0, J McPartland 0–2, E O Hara 0–1.	Referee: P Russell (Tipperary)

Final

1 July 2001 Final	Roscommon	2–10 – 1–12	Mayo	Dr. Hyde Park, Roscommon
	G Lohan 2–2, (0-1f, 0–1 '45), F Dolan 0–3 (1 '45), S O'Neill 0–2, C Connelly, J Hanley and S Lohan 0–1 each.	Report	K McDonald 0–4 (1f), M Moyles 1–0, M Sheridan 0–3 (1f; 1 '45), C McManaman, T Mortimer, S Carolan, M McNicholas, M Moyle 0–1 each.	Attendance: 28,000; Referee: S McCormack (Meath)

=== Munster Senior Football Championship ===
Quarter-finals
Cork	3–16
Waterford	1–07
Tipperary	1–04
Kerry	3–17

Semi-finals
Cork	2–11
Clare	1–10
Limerick	0–10
Kerry	1–15

Final
Cork	1–13
Kerry	0–19

Quarter-finals

13 May 2001 Quarter-final	Tipperary	1–4 – 3–17	Kerry	Ned Hall Park, Clonmel
	S Maher 1–0, D O'Brien 0–2, K Mulryan 0–1, P Lambert 0–1.		D Ó Cinnéide 1–2, J Crowley 1–2, N Kennelly 1–1, M Fitzgerald 0–4, MF Russell 0–3, D O'Dwyer 0–2, A Mac Gearailt 0–1, D Quill 0–1, E Brosnan 0–1.	Attendance: 5,621; Referee: M Monaghan (Kildare)

13 May 2001 Quarter-final	Waterford	1–7 – 3–16	Cork	Páirc Uí Chaoimh, Cork
	J Hennessy 1–0, C Power 0–3, G Hurney 0–2, B Wall 0–1, G Walsh 0–1.		F Murray 2–2, A Dorgan 1–2, BJ O'Sullivan 0–2, G Canty 0–2, M O'Sullivan 0–2, M Cronin 0–2, E Sexton 0–1, A Lynch 0–1, J Kavanagh 0–1, J Miskella 0–1.	Referee: E Whelan (Laois)

Semi-finals

17 June 2001 Semi-final	Kerry	1–15 – 0–10	Limerick	FitzGerald Stadium, Killarney
	MF Russell 1–4, J Crowley 0–3, M Fitzgerald 0–3, D Ó Cinnéide 0–2, N Kennelly 0–1, W Kirby 0–1, D Ó Sé 0–1.		M Reidy 0–3, N Hunt 0–1, M Gavin 0–1, C Mullane 0–1, S Lucey 0–1, C Hickey 0–1, J Quane 0–1, D Sheehy 0–1.	Attendance: 17,582; Referee: B Crowe (Cavan)

24 June 2001 Semi-final	Cork	2–11 – 1–10	Clare	Páirc Uí Chaoimh, Cork
	BJ O'Sullivan 1–2, F Murray 1–2, C Corkery 0–2, C O'Sullivan 0–2, C Murphy 0–1, A Dorgan 0–1, P Clifford 0–1.		C Mullen 1–4, Denis Russell 0–4, M O'Shea 0–1, P Hehir 0–1.	Attendance: 9,787; Referee: S McCormack (Meath)

Final

15 July 2001 Final	Kerry	0–19 – 1–13	Cork	Páirc Uí Chaoimh, Cork
	D Ó Cinnéide 0–9, J Crowley 0–4, A Mac Gearailt 0–2, MF Russell 0–2, D Daly 0–2.	Report	C Corkery 0–8, J Kavanagh 1–1, F Murray 0–1, P Clifford 0–1, BJ O'Sullivan 0–1, A Dorgan 0–1.	Attendance: 41,158; Referee: B O'Gorman (Armagh)

=== 2001 Ulster Senior Football Championship ===
Preliminary round
Donegal	0–11
Fermanagh	1–09

Quarter-finals
Antrim	0–09
Derry	1–11
Armagh	1–09
Tyrone	1–14
Down	2–10
Cavan	1–14
Fermanagh	0–14
Monaghan	2–10

Semi-finals
Derry	0–14
Tyrone	3–07
Cavan	0–13
Monaghan	0–11

Final
Tyrone	1–13
Cavan	1–11

Preliminary round

13 May 2001 Preliminary round	Donegal	1–16 – 2–13	Fermanagh	MacCumhaill Park, Ballybofey
	A Sweeney 1–3, B Devenney 0–6, M Hegarty 0–2, M Crossan 0–1, P McGonigle 0–1, J Gallagher 0–1, B Roper 0–1, T Boyle 0–1.		S Maguire 1–5, Rory Gallagher 0–6, M O’Donnell 1–0, K Donnelly 0–1, S King 0–1.	Referee: S Prior (Leitrim)

19 May 2001 Preliminary round replay	Fermanagh	1–9 – 0–11	Donegal	Brewster Park, Enniskillen
	R Gallagher 0–7, M O’Donnell 1–0, T Brewster 0–1, K Donnelly 0–1.		A Sweeney 0–3, B Roper 0–2, M Hegerty 0–2, J Gildea 0–1, P McGonigle 0–1, J McGuinness 0–1, B Devenney 0–1.

Quarter-finals

20 May 2001 Quarter-final	Tyrone	1–14 – 1–9	Armagh	St Tiernach's Park, Clones
	S O’Neill 0–5, O Mulligan 1–0, B Dooher 0–2, Peter Canavan 0–2, Pascal Canavan 0–1, G Cavlan 0–1, D McCrossan 0–1, C McAnallen 0–1, B McGuigan 0–1.		S McDonnell 1–2, O McConville 0–4, D Marsden 0–2, C O’Rourke 0–1.	Referee: J Bannon (Longford)

27 May 2001 Quarter-final	Down	2–10 – 1–14	Cavan	Casement Park, Belfast
	M Walsh 1–4, M Linden 1–1, L Doyle 0–2, S Ward 0–2, S Mulholland 0–1.		P Reilly 0–4, J Reilly 1–0, M Graham 0–2, P Galligan 0–2, D McCabe 0–2, D McCrudden 0–1, E Jackson 0–1, F O’Reilly 0–1, L Reilly 0–1.	Referee: S McCormack (Meath)

3 June 2001 Quarter-final	Derry	1–11 – 0–9	Antrim	Celtic Park, Derry
	P. Bradley 1–3, E. Muldoon 0–4, G. Coleman 0–1, A. Tohill 0–1, D. Heaney 0–1, G. Diamond 0–1.		P. Logan 0–8, K. Brady 0–1.	Referee: P O'Toole (Longford)

10 June 2001 Quarter-final	Fermanagh	0–14 – 2–10	Monaghan	Brewster Park, Enniskillen
	Rory Gallagher 0–8, T Brewster 0–4, K Donnelly 0–1, M O’Donnell 0–1.		C Tavey 1–3, R Ronaghan 1–0, J McElroy 0–2, D Farmer 0–2, G Meehan 0–1, D Smyth 0–1, T Freeman 0–1.	Referee: M Curley (Galway)

Semi-finals

17 June 2001 Semi-final	Tyrone	3–7 – 0–14	Derry	St Tiernach's Park, Clones
	S O’Neill 1–2, G Cavlan 1–1, B Dooher 1–0, R McMenamin 0–1, C McAnallen 0–1, E Mulligan 0–1, Peter Canavan 0–1.		P Bradley 0–5, G Diamond 0–3, A Tohill 0–3, E. Muldoon 0–2, P Murphy 0–1.	Referee: P Russell (Tipperary)

24 June 2001 Semi-final	Monaghan	0–11 – 0–13	Cavan	St Tiernach's Park, Clones
	T Freeman 0–4, G Meehan 0–2, D Smyth 0–2, D Farmer 0–1, P Duffy 0–1, C Tavey 0–1.		F O’Reilly 0–5, D McCabe 0–3, A Forde 0–1, P Reilly 0–1, P Galligan 0–1, E Jackson 0–1, L Reilly 0–1.	Referee: M Collins (Cork)

Final

8 July 2001 Final	Tyrone	1–13 – 1–11	Cavan	St Tiernach's Park, Clones
	S O’Neill 0–4, C McAnallen 1–0, Peter Canavan 0–3, G Cavlan 0–2, D McCrossan 0–1, K Hughes 0–1, B Dooher 0–1, E Gormley 0–1.		J Reilly 1–1, F O’Reilly 0–3, P Reilly 0–3, P Galligan 0–2, A Forde 0–1, D McCabe 0–1.	Referee: M Collins (Cork)

=== Leinster Senior Football Championship ===
1st round
Wexford	0–14
Laois	0–18
Longford	1–11
Louth	1–09
Carlow	0–09
Wicklow	0–08

Quarter-finals
Laois	0–12
Offaly	1–13
Longford	1–13
Dublin	2–19
Carlow	1–11
Kildare	0–19
Westmeath	1–14
Meath	2–12

Semi-finals
Offaly	0–13
Dublin	1–12
Kildare	1–11
Meath	1–16

Final
Dublin	0–14
Meath	2–11

First round

6 May 2001 First round	Louth	1–9 – 1–11	Longford	Páirc Tailteann, Navan
	JP Rooney 1–2, M Stanfield 0–2, M Farrelly 0–2, N Malone 0–1, C Grimes 0–1, O McDonnell 0–1.		P Davis 1–5, T Smullen 0–3, J Martin 0–2, N Sheridan 0–1.	Referee: D Joyce (Galway)

6 May 2001 First round	Laois	0–18 – 0–14	Wexford	Dr. Cullen Park, Carlow
	C Conway 0–6, I Fitzgerald 0–4, D Sweeney 0–3, B McDonald 0–2, J Kealy 0–1, N Garvan 0–1, K Kelly 0–1.		J Hegarty 0–6, L O’Brien 0–5, R Barry 0–1, D Murphy 0–1, T Howlin 0–1.	Referee: B Crowe (Cavan)

13 May 2001 First round	Wicklow	2–6 – 1–9	Carlow	St. Conleth's Park, Newbridge
	R Coffey 1–1, T Gill 0–4, K Byrne 1–0, T Hannon 0–1.		S Kavanagh 0–5, S O’Brien 1–0, J Kavanagh 0–2, M Carpenter 0–1, B Kelly 0–1.	Referee: P McEneaney (Monaghan)

20 May 2001 First round replay	Wicklow	0–8 – 0–9	Carlow	St. Conleth's Park, Newbridge
	T Gill 0–6, S Cush 0–1, J Behan 0–1.		W Quinlan 0–3, J Hickey 0–1, J Byrne 0–1, S Kavanagh 0–1, J Nevin 0–1, P Nolan 0–1, B Kelly 0–1.	Referee: P Russell (Tipperary)

Quarter-finals

27 May 2001 Quarter-final	Offaly	1–13 – 0–12	Laois	Croke Park, Dublin
	V Claffey 1–2, C Quinn 0–4, G Comerford 0–3, M Keenaghan 0–2, C McManus 0–2.		C Conway 0–5, I Fitzgerald 0–3, C Parkinson 0–2, J Kealy 0–1, B McDonald 0–1.	Referee: M McGrath (Donegal)

27 May 2001 Quarter-final	Dublin	2–19 – 1–13	Longford	Croke Park, Dublin
	C Whelan 0–5, S Connell 0–5, W McCarthy 1–1, C Moran 1–0, J Sherlock 0–2, E Sheehy 0–2, D Homan 0–1, V Murphy 0–1, S Ryan 0–1, P Curran 0–1.		P Davis 1–5, J Martin 0–2, P Barden 0–2, D Blessington 0–1, E Ledwith 0–1, E Barden 0–1, T Smullen 0–1,	Referee: M Collins (Cork)

3 June 2001 Quarter-final	Kildare	0–19 – 1–11	Carlow	Croke Park, Dublin
	P Brennan 0–8, R Sweeney 0–3, D Earley 0–2, A Rainbow 0–2, J Doyle 0–2, K O’Dwyer 0–1, M Lynch 0–1.		W Quinlan 1–4, S O’Brien 0–2, M Carpenter 0–2, A Bowe 0–1, S Kavanagh 0–1, J Nevin 0–1.	Referee: M Convery (Derry)

3 June 2001 Quarter-final	Meath	2–12 – 1–14	Westmeath	Croke Park, Dublin
	O Murphy 2–2, T Giles 0–6, G Geraghty 0–2, N Nestor 0–1, R Magee 0–1.		G Heavin 1–5, F Wilson 0–5, M Ennis 0–2, P Conway 0–1, D Dolan 0–1.	Referee: N Barrett (Cork)

Semi-finals

17 June 2001 Semi-final	Dublin	1–12 – 0–13	Offaly	Croke Park, Dublin
	I Robertson 1–1, W McCarthy 0–4, D Farrell 0–2, V Murphy 0–2, S Connell 0–2, J Sherlock 0–1.		V Claffey 0–3, C Quinn 0–2, A McNamee 0–2, R Malone 0–2, C McManus 0–1, G Comerford 0–1, M Keenaghan 0–1, S Grennan 0–1.	Attendance: 32,198; Referee: P McEnaney (Monaghan)

24 June 2001 Semi-final	Meath	1–16 – 1–11	Kildare	Croke Park, Dublin
	T Giles 1–5, O Murphy 0–4, G Geraghty 0–4, N Nestor 0–1, D Curtis 0–1, E Kelly 0–1.		P Brennan 0–4, K Brennan 1–0, N Buckley 0–3, J Doyle 0–1, B Lacey 0–1, K O'Dwyer 0–1, E McCormack 0–1.	Attendance: 45,921; Referee: B Gorman (Armagh)

Final

15 July 2001 Final	Dublin	0–14 – 2–11	Meath	Croke Park, Dublin
	C Moran 0–4, D Farrell 0–3, C Whelan 0–3, W McCarthy 0–3, J Sherlock 0–1.		R Kealy 1–1, G Geraghty 1–0, T Giles 0–3, E Kelly 0–3, D Curtis 0–2, O Murphy 0–1, R Magee 0–1.	Attendance: 66,275; Referee: M Curley (Galway)

== All-Ireland qualifiers ==
=== Round 1 ===
9 June 2001 Round 1	Down	2–4 – 1–13	Armagh	Casement Park, Belfast
	B Coulter 1–0, M Linden 1–0, M Walsh 0–2, S Mulholland 0–1, S Ward 0–1.		S McDonnell 1–2, O McConville 0–4, J McEntee 0–3, K McGeeney 0–2, P McGrane 0–1, B O’Hagan 0–1.	Referee: P McEneaney (Monaghan)

9 June 2001 Round 1	Antrim	0–13 – 1–8	Leitrim	Casement Park, Belfast
	P Logan 0–8, K Brady 0–2, J Quinn 0–2, P McCann 0–1.		A Charles 1–1, A Rooney 0–4, F McLoughlin 0–1, J Guckian 0–1, F McBrien 0–1.

9 June 2001 Round 1	Waterford	1–10 – 3–11	Carlow	Fraher Field, Dungarvan
	G Hurney 1–3, W Hennessy 0–2, M Ahern 0–2, E Hogan 0–2, R Hennessy 0–1.		W Quinlan 0–4, J Nevin 1–0, M Carpenter 1–0, C Kelly 1–0, B Kelly 0–3, S O’Brien 0–1, J Byrne 0–1, A Bowe 0–1, J Kavanagh 0–1.	Referee: H Beirne (Roscommon)

9 June 2001 Round 1	Tipperary	1–8 – 0–13	Louth	Ned Hall Park, Clonmel
	P Lambert 1–1, J Shanahan 0–2, D O’Brien 0–2, K Maguire 0–1, T Ormond 0–1, D Byrne 0–1.		M Stanfield 0–6, C Grimes 0–2, D Reilly 0–2, S Gerard 0–1, D Kirwan 0–1, C Kelly 0–1.	Referee: G Kinneavy (Roscommon)

9 June 2001 Round 1	Wicklow	1–14 – 0–11	Longford	Aughrim County Ground, Aughrim
	K Byrne 1–5, D Coffey 0–4, T Hannon 0–3, P Callaghan 0–1, B Ó hAnnaidh 0–1.		T Smullen 0–4, P Barden 0–3, A O’Connor 0–1, J Martin 0–1, M Mulleady 0–1, E Barden 0–1.	Referee: M Hughes (Tyrone)

9 June 2001 Round 1	Wexford	1–19 – 1–19 (aet)	Westmeath	Wexford Park, Wexford
	L O’Brien 0–11, D Kinsella 1–1, M Forde 0–3, J Hegarty 0–2, J Berry 0–1, T Howlin 0–1.		J Fallon 0–8, M Flanagan 1–2, G Heavin 0–5, D Dolan 0–2, M Ennis 0–1, R O’Connell 0–1.	Referee: A Mangan (Kerry)

16 June 2001 Round 1	Fermanagh	1–6 – 0–15	Donegal	Brewster Park, Enniskillen
	M O’Donnell 1–0, C Donnelly 0–2, Rory Gallagher 0–2, L McBarron 0–1, P Brewster 0–1.		B Devenney 0–6, A Sweeney 0–4, B Roper 0–2, M Hegarty 0–1, B McLoughlin 0–1, T Boyle 0–1.	Referee: E Murtagh (Longford)

16 June 2001 Round 1 replay	Westmeath	1–16 – 1–8	Wexford	Cusack Park, Mullingar
	G Heavin 1–3, J Fallon 0–6, D Dolan 0–4, M Ennis 0–2, F Wilson 0–1.		L O’Brien 0–5, M Forde 1–0, J Hegarty 0–2, D Kinsella 0–1.	Referee: S Prior (Leitrim)

=== Round 2 ===
23 June 2001 Round 2	Louth	0–12 – 1–8	Offaly	Páirc Tailteann, Navan
	C Kelly 0–4, C Grimes 0–3, C O’Hanlon 0–2, O McDonnell 0–1, D Reilly 0–1, S O’Hanlon 0–1.		C McManus 0–3, A McNamee 0–1, P Keelaghan 0–1, V Claffey 0–1, N Coughlan 0–1, B O’Brien 0–1.	Referee: M Curley (Galway)

23 June 2001 Round 2	Antrim	0–7 – 0–10	Derry	Casement Park, Belfast
	A Finnegan 0–2, P McCann 0–2, F Wilson 0–1, A Morris 0–1, K Madden 0–1.		G Diamond 0–3, P Bradley 0–2, J Niblock 0–2, E. Muldoon 0–1, J McBride 0–1, F Crossan 0–1.	Referee: J Smith (Meath)

23 June 2001 Round 2	Limerick	0–7 – 0–17	Westmeath	Gaelic Grounds, Limerick
	M Reidy 0–2, D Reidy 0–1, P Ahern 0–1, J Quane 0–1, J Murphy 0–1, C Hickey 0–1.		G Heavin 0–8, J Fallon 0–4, M Ennis 0–2, D Dolan 0–1, D Heavin 0–1, B Morley 0–1.	Referee: M Daly (Mayo)

23 June 2001 Round 2	Carlow	2–7 – 2–14	Sligo	Dr. Cullen Park, Carlow
	J McGrath 2–0, W Quinlan 0–3, S Kavanagh 0–2, J Nevin 0–1, B Kelly 0–1.		D Sloyan 1–2, G McGowan 0–4, P Taylor 0–4, S Davey 1–0, P Naughton 0–1, J McPartland 0–1, E O’Hara 0–1, D McGarty 0–1.	Referee: M Ryan (Limerick)

30 June 2001 Round 2	Kildare	1–17 – 1–16	Donegal	St. Conleth's Park, Newbridge
	J Doyle 0–5, M Lynch 1–1, P Brennan 0–3, E McCormack 0–3, T Fennin 0–2, N Buckley 0–2, K Doyle 0–1.		B Devenney 1–5, A Sweeney 0–3, T Boyle 0–3, A Gallagher 0–2, B McLaughlin 0–1, J Gildea 0–1, N Hegarty 0–1.	Referee: N Barrett (Cork)

30 June 2001 Round 2	Wicklow	1–9 – 3–12	Galway	Aughrim County Ground, Aughrim
	T Gill 1–1, D Coffey 0–2 (1f), T Burke, S O'Neill, T Hannon ('45'), J Behan, O Ó hAnnaidh, D Jackman 0–1 each.		J Fallon 1–1, K Comer 1–1 (1f), A Kerins 1–0, P Joyce 0–3 (1f, 1 '45'), T Joyce 0–3, J Bergin 0–2, M Donnellan 0–1, S Óg de Paor 0–1.	Referee: P McEnaney (Monaghan)

30 June 2001 Round 2	Laois	0–13 – 1–8	Clare	O'Moore Park, Portlaoise
	I Fitzgerald 0–3, M O’Brien 0–2, D Brennan 0–2, C Conway 0–2, J Higgins 0–1, J Kealy 0–1, N Garvan 0–1, G Ramsbottom 0–1.		J Young 1–1, Denis Russell 0–4, C Mullen 0–1, P McMahon 0–1, S Hickey 0–1.	Referee: M McBrien (Fermanagh)

30 June 2001 Round 2	Monaghan	0–10 – 2–12	Armagh	St. Tiernach's Park, Clones
	T Freeman 0–3, R Mone 0–2, G Meehan 0–1, D McArdle 0–1, C Flanagan 0–1, C Tavey 0–1.		S McDonnell 1–3, O McConville 0–4, J Toal 1–0, B O’Hagan 0–3, C O’Rourke 0–1, M O’Rourke 0–1.	Referee: J Bannon (Longford)

=== Round 3 ===
7 July 2001 Round 3	Galway	0–13 – 0–12	Armagh	Croke Park, Dublin
	P Joyce 0–5 (3f, 1 '45), M Donnellan, P Clancy, T Joyce 0–2 each, A Kerins, J Fallon 0–1 each.		C O'Rourke 0–3 (3f), S McDonnell, D Marsden, B O'Hagan, O McConville (2f) 0–2 each, T McEntee 0–1.	Referee: B White (Wexford)

7 July 2001 Round 3	Sligo	0–16 – 0–15	Kildare	Croke Park, Dublin
	D Sloyan 0–8, G McGowan 0–2, S Davey 0–2, E O’Hara 0–1, D McGarty 0–1, J McPartland 0–1, P Doohan 0–1.		P Brennan 0–7, M Lynch 0–2, E McCormack 0–2, J Doyle 0–1, D Earley 0–1, A Rainbow 0–1, J Finn 0–1.	Referee: B Crowe (Cavan)

7 July 2001 Round 3	Louth	0–13 – 1–13	Westmeath	Páirc Tailteann, Navan
	C Kelly 0–3, M Stanfield 0–2, S O’Hanlon 0–2, M Farrelly 0–2, C Grimes 0–1, David Reilly 0–1, O McDonnell 0–1, D Kirwan 0–1.		F Wilson 0–6, M Flanagan 1–1, G Heavin 0–3, D Dolan 0–3.	Referee: P Russell (Tipperary)

7 July 2001 Round 3	Derry	1–8 – 0–8	Laois	Breffni Park, Cavan
	E. Muldoon 1–1, G Diamond 0–3, J McBride 0–1, A Tohill 0–1, P Bradley 0–1, P Murphy 0–1.		C Conway 0–3, I Fitzgerald 0–2, S Cooke 0–1, N Garvan 0–1, G Ramsbottom 0–1.	Referee: S Prior (Leitrim)

=== Round 4 ===
21 July 2001 Round 4	Mayo	0–16 – 1–14	Westmeath	Dr. Hyde Park, Roscommon
	T Mortimer 0–4, M Sheridan 0–4, K McDonald 0–4, S Carolan 0–1, A Roche 0–1, C McManamon 0–1, J Gill 0–1.		G Heavin 0–5, M Ennis 1–0, D Dolan 0–2, P Conway 0–2, D Healy 0–1, F Wilson 0–1, J Fallon 0–1, M Flanagan 0–1, D Gavin 0–1.	Referee: N Barrett (Cork)

22 July 2001 Round 4	Galway	1–14 – 1–10	Cork	Croke Park, Dublin
	P Joyce 0–6, S Óg de Paor 1–0, T Joyce 0–2, J Fallon 0–2, M Clancy 0–2, P Clancy 0–1, M Donnellan 0–1.		F Murray 1–2, C Corkery 0–5, BJ O’Sullivan 0–2, P O’Mahony 0–1.	Referee: J Bannon (Longford)

22 July 2001 Round 4	Dublin	3–17 – 0–12	Sligo	Croke Park, Dublin
	D Farrell 1–4, C Whelan 1–2, D Darcy 0–5, E Sheehy 1–0, S Connell 0–2, C Goggins 0–1, W McCarthy 0–1, P Curran 0–1, K Darcy 0–1.		D Sloyan 0–5, P Durcan 0–2, G McGowan 0–2, E O’Hara 0–1, K O’Neill 0–1, P Taylor 0–1.	Referee: P McEneaney (Monaghan)

22 July 2001 Round 4	Cavan	2–7 – 1–14	Derry	St. Tiernach's Park, Clones
	P Reilly 1–2, F O’Reilly 0–4, A Forde 1–0, D McCabe 0–1.		A Tohill 1–4, P McFlynn 0–3, P Bradley 0–2, D Heaney 0–1, G Coleman 0–1, J McBride 0–1, E. Muldoon 0–1, G Diamond 0–1.	Referee: M Curley (Galway)

== All-Ireland Senior Football Championship ==
The provincial champions and the winners of round 4 contested the quarter-finals. The quarter final matches were held at neutral sites and pitted each provincial champion against a round 4 winner.

Quarter-finals
Kerry	2–12
Dublin	1–12
Meath	2–10
Westmeath	0–11
Derry	1–09
Tyrone	0–07
Galway	0–14
Roscommon	1–05

Semi-finalstes
Kerry	0–05
Meath	2–14
Derry	1–11
Galway	1–14

Final
Meath	0–08
Galway	0–17

=== Quarter-finals ===
Three of the quarter-finals involved teams who had previously met in their respective provinces. The exception was Dublin v Kerry, which in itself was exceptional in that it was held at Semple Stadium in Thurles.

4 August 2001 Quarter-final	Galway	0–14 – 1–5	Roscommon	MacHale Park, Castlebar
	P Joyce 0–7, D Savage 0–2, M Donnellan 0–2, K Walsh 0–1, S Óg de Paor 0–1, J Bergin 0–1.		J Dunning 1–0, F Dolan 0–2, G Lohan 0–1, F Grehan 0–1, S Lohan 0–1.	Attendance: 34,000; Referee: J Bannon (Longford)

4 August 2001 Quarter-final	Kerry	1–14 – 2–11	Dublin	Semple Stadium, Thurles
	D Ó Cinnéide 0–6, A Mac Gearailt 1–1, J Crowley 0–3, MF Russell 0–2, E Brosnan 0–1, M Fitzgerald 0–1.		D Darcy 0–6, D Homan 1–1, Murphy 1–0, D Farrell 0–1, J Sherlock 0–1, C Whelan 0–1, W McCarthy 0–1.	Attendance: 51,250; Referee: M Curley (Galway)

5 August 2001 Quarter-final	Derry	1–9 – 0–7	Tyrone	St. Tiernach's Park, Clones
	P Bradley 1–3, A Tohill 0–3, G Diamond 0–2, E. Muldoon 0–1.		S O'Neill 0–4, C McAnallen 0–1, G Cavlan 0–1, C Gormley 0–1.	Attendance: 23,107; Referee: P McEneaney (Monaghan)

5 August 2001 Quarter-final	Meath	2–12 – 3–9	Westmeath	Croke Park, Dublin
	O Murphy 2–1, T Giles 0–3, G Geraghty 0–2, N Crawford 0–2, E Kelly 0–1, R Magee 0–1, D Curtis 0–1, R Kealy 0–1.		D Dolan 1–3, J Fallon 0–5, P Conway 1–0, M Ennis 1–0, G Heavin 0–1.	Attendance: 45,000; Referee: M Collins (Cork)

11 August 2001 Quarter-final replay	Kerry	2–12 – 1–12	Dublin	Semple Stadium, Thurles
	J Crowley 2–2, D Ó Cinnéide 0–4, MF Russell 0–3, N Kennelly 0–2, M Fitzgerald 0–1.	Report	D Darcy 0–4, D Homan 1–0, W McCarthy 0–2, D Farrell 0–1, J Sherlock 0–1, C Whelan 0–1, P Curran 0–1, S Connell 0–1.	Attendance: 40,245; Referee: P McEneaney (Monaghan)

11 August 2001 Quarter-final replay	Meath	2–10 – 0–11	Westmeath	Croke Park, Dublin
	R McGee 1–3, G Geraghty 1–0, O Murphy 0–2, T Giles 0–2, E Kelly 0–2, N Crawford 0–1.		J Fallon 0–5, P Conway 0–2, G Heavin 0–2, D Dolan 0–1, R O'Connell 0–1.	Attendance: 32,921; Referee: P Russell (Tipperary)

=== Semi-finals ===
26 August 2001 Semi-final	Galway	1–14 – 1–11	Derry	Croke Park, Dublin
	P Joyce 0–5, M Clancy 1–0, D Savage 0–3, J Bergin 0–2, S Óg de Paor 0–1, K Walsh 0–1, M Donnellan 0–1, P Clancy 0–1.	Report	E. Muldoon 1–0, D Dougan 0–3, J McBride 0–2, P Bradley 0–2, A Tohill 0–1, P McFlynn 0–1, G Diamond 0–1, D Heaney 0–1.	Attendance: 40,060; Referee: M Collins (Cork)

2 September 2001 Semi-final	Meath	2–14 – 0–5	Kerry	Croke Park, Dublin
	O Murphy 0–4, J McDermott 1–0, J Cullinane 1–0, R Magee 0–3, E Kelly 0–2, N Nestor 0–1, H Traynor 0–1, T Giles 0–1, R Kealy 0–1, G Geraghty 0–1.	Report	E Brosnan 0–1, MF Russell 0–1, D Ó Cinnéide 0–1, J Crowley 0–1, D Quill 0–1.	Attendance: 61,295; Referee: B White (Wexford)

=== Final ===
23 September 2001 Final	Galway	0–17 – 0–8	Meath	Croke Park, Dublin
	P Joyce 0–10, P Clancy 0–2, J Bergin 0–2, M Donnellan 0–1, J Fallon 0–1, T Meehan 0–1.	Report	R Magee 0–2, N Crawford 0–1, J McDermott 0–1, E Kelly 0–1, T Giles 0–1, O Murphy 0–1, J Cullinane 0–1.	Attendance: 70,482; Referee: M Collins (Cork)

== Championship statistics ==
=== Scoring ===
Overall

Rank	Player	County	Tally	Total	Matches	Average
1	Pádraic Joyce	Galway	3–45	54	8	6.75
2	Ger Heavin	Westmeath	2–32	38	8	4.75
3	Joe Fallon	Westmeath	0–29	29	8	3.67
4	Ollie Murphy	Meath	4–15	27	7	3.85
4	Dara Ó Cinnéide	Kerry	1–24	27	6	4.50
6	Johnny Crowley	Kerry	3–15	24	6	4.00
6	Trevor Giles	Meath	1–21	24	7	3.43
8	Rory Gallagher	Fermanagh	0–23	23	4	5.75
9	Dessie Sloyan	Sligo	1–19	22	4	5.50
9	Pádraig Brennan	Kildare	0–22	22	4	5.50

Single game

Rank	Player	County	Tally	Total	Opposition
1	Pádraic Joyce	Galway	3-03	12	Leitrim
2	Leigh O'Brien	Wexford	0–11	11	Westmeath
3	Pádraic Joyce	Galway	0–10	10	Meath
4	Dara Ó Cinnéide	Kerry	0-09	9	Cork
5	Gerry Lohan	Roscommon	2-02	8	Mayo
5	Fionán Murray	Cork	2-02	8	Waterford
5	Ollie Murphy	Meath	2-02	8	Westmeath
5	Johnny Crowley	Kerry	2-02	8	Dublin
5	Pádraig Davis	Longford	1-05	8	Dublin
5	Stephen Maguire	Fermanagh	1-05	8	Donegal
5	Pádraig Davis	Longford	1-05	8	Louth
5	Ger Heavin	Westmeath	1-05	8	Meath
5	Trevor Giles	Meath	1-05	8	Kildare
5	Keith Byrne	Wicklow	1-05	8	Longford
5	Brendan Devenney	Donegal	1-05	8	Kildare
5	Colin Corkery	Cork	0-08	8	Kerry
5	Paddy Logan	Antrim	0-08	8	Derry
5	Rory Gallagher	Fermanagh	0-08	8	Monaghan
5	Pádraig Brennan	Kildare	0-08	8	Carlow
5	Paddy Logan	Antrim	0-08	8	Leitrim
5	Joe Fallon	Westmeath	0-08	8	Wexford
5	Ger Heavin	Westmeath	0-08	8	Limerick
5	Dessie Sloyan	Sligo	0-08	8	Kildare

=== Miscellaneous ===
- The foot-and-mouth disease outbreak in the neighbouring island of Britain caused London to withdraw from the championship.
- Louth defeated Tipperary by two points in the first ever All-Ireland Qualifier.
- Galway become the first county to win the All-Ireland by coming through the Back Door.
