= Brian Lacey (Gaelic footballer) =

Irish Gaelic footballer

Personal information
- Native name: Briain Ó Laitheasa (Irish)
- Born: 1974 (age 51–52) County Tipperary, Ireland

Sport
- Sport: Gaelic football
- Position: Right corner-back
Clubs
- Years: Club
- Arravale Rovers; Round Towers
Club titles
- Kildare titles: 2
Inter-county
- Years: County
- 1995–1997 1998–2004 2005–2006: Tipperary; Kildare; Tipperary
Inter-county titles
- Leinster titles: 2
- All-Irelands: 0
- NFL: 0
- All Stars: 1

Brian Lacey (born 1974) is an Irish former Gaelic footballer who played as a right corner-back for the Tipperary and Kildare senior teams.

Born in Tipperary, Lacey first arrived on the inter-county scene at the age of seventeen when he linked up with the Tipperary minor hurling team, before later joining the under-21 football side. He joined the senior football panel during the 1995 championship. Lacey immediately became a regular member of the starting fifteen before later joining the Kildare senior team. Throughout his career he won two Leinster SFC medals and one Tommy Murphy Cup medal.

Lacey was a member of the Munster and Leinster inter-provincial teams on a number of occasions. At club level he is a two-time championship medallist with Round Towers. He began his career with Arravale Rovers.

Lacey retired from inter-county football following the conclusion of the 2006 championship.

He is a brother of former rugby union player-turned referee John Lacey.

== Honours ==
=== Player ===
Round Towers

- Kildare Senior Football Championship (2): 1998, 2003

Tipperary

- Tommy Murphy Cup (1): 2005

Kildare

- Leinster Senior Football Championship (2): 1998, 2000
