= Stephen Lohan =

Irish Gaelic footballer

Personal information
- Born: Kilbride, County Roscommon

Sport
- Sport: Gaelic football
- Position: Midfield/Forward
Club
- Years: Club
- 2000's: Kilbride
Club titles
- Roscommon titles: 1
Inter-county
- Years: County
- 1999-200?: Roscommon
Inter-county titles
- Connacht titles: 1
- All-Irelands: 0
- NFL: 0
- All Stars: 0

Stephen Lohan is a Gaelic footballer from County Roscommon, Ireland. He played with the Roscommon intercounty team from 1999 to 200?. He won Connacht Championships at Under 21 level in 1999 as captain and at senior level in 2001.

At club level he helped Kilbride to a Roscommon Senior Football Championship title in 2000, their first since 1914.

He played with his brothers Garry and Eddie at intercounty and club level.
