= 2000 Ulster Senior Football Championship final =

Ulster Championship Match

2000 Ulster SFC Final
- Event: 2000 Ulster Senior Football Championship
Armagh	Derry
1-12 (15)	1-11 (14)
- Date: 16 July 2000
- Venue: St Tiernach's Park, Clones
- Referee: Mick Curley (Galway)
- Attendance: 33,253

The 2000 Ulster Senior Football Championship Final was the showpiece game of that year's Ulster Championship, contested by Armagh and Derry and played at St Tiernach's Park, Clones on 16 July 2000. Armagh were the defending champions, having beaten Down at the same stage the previous year.

Armagh won the game by 1–12 to 1–11, qualifying for the All-Ireland Semi Final against Munster Champions Kerry.

== The match ==
Armagh's tactical approach involved a two-man full-forward line of Oisín McConville and Steven McDonnell, pulling additional players into the middle third. This move "neutralised" Derry’s midfield pairing of Anthony Tohill and Dermot Heaney and disrupted Derry’s defensive structure. Repeated attacks down the left wing highlighted the absence of Gary Coleman from Derry's half-back line as he was drawn into marking duties. Armagh capitalised on these opportunities to build a lead.

Despite Armagh's dominance, they failed to score for a period in the second half. This period, between the 49th and 67th minutes, allowed Derry to gain some control. However, Derry’s own attacking inefficiencies and missed opportunities, including frees, prevented them from taking the lead.

With the sides level in the 67th minute, a free given in controversial circumstances from Armagh forward Oisín McConville pushed Armagh into the lead. At the other end, Derry captain Anthonhy Tohill had the chance to level things again with a 55-yard free but hit wide, and referee Michael Curley blew the final whistle.

Derry boss Eamon Coleman resigned after the game.

== Details ==
16 July 2000
Final

Armagh	1-12 - 1-11	Derry
S McDonnell 1-1, C O'Rourke 0-4, O McConville 0-3, J McNulty 0-1, J McEntee 0-1, P McGrane 0-1, B O'Hagan 0-1.		J McBride 1-3, A Tohill 0-4, E. Muldoon 0-2, D Dougan 0-1, J Cassidy 0-1.

St Tiernach's Park, Clones
Attendance: 33,253
Referee: M Curley (Galway)

Armagh	Derry

1	Brendan Tierney
2	Enda McNulty
3	Ger Reid
4	Justin McNulty
5	Kieran Hughes
6	Kieran McGeeney (c)
7	Andrew McCann
8	John McEntee
9	Paul McGrane
10	Cathal O'Rourke
11	Barry O'Hagan	(substituted off) 69'
12	Paddy McKeever	(substituted off) 63'
13	Stephen McDonnell
14	Tony McEntee
15	Oisín McConville
Substitutes:
	Alan O'Neill	(substituted in) 63'
	James Byrne	(substituted in) 69'
Manager:
Brian McAlinden and Brian Canavan

1	Eoin McCloskey
2	Sean Martin Lockhart
3	Kieran McKeever
4	Gary Coleman
5	Paul McFlynn
6	Henry Downey
7	Niall McCusker
8	Anthony Tohill (c)
9	Dermot Heaney
10	Eamonn Burns	(substituted off) HT'
11	Dermot Dougan	(substituted off) 51'
12	Joe Cassidy	(substituted off) 64'
13	Patrick Bradley	(substituted off) HT'
14	Enda Muldoon
15	Johnny McBride
Substitutes:
	Joe Brolly	(substituted in) HT'
	Ronan Rocks	(substituted in) HT'
	Seamus Downey	(substituted in) 51'
	Fergal McCusker	(substituted in) 64'
Manager:
Eamon Coleman

Man of the Match:
Ger Reid (Armagh )
