= Cork–Tipperary Gaelic football rivalry =

Cork-Tipperary
- Location: County Cork; County Tipperary
- Teams: Cork; Tipperary
- First meeting: Tipperary 0-2 - 0-1 Cork; 1888 Munster quarter-final (27 May 1888)
- Latest meeting: Cork 4-18 - 1-12 Tipperary; 2026 Munster semi-final (26 April 2026)

Statistics
- Total meetings: 52
- Most wins: Cork (34)
- All-time series: Cork 34-2-16 Tipperary

The Cork-Tipperary rivalry is a Gaelic football rivalry between Irish county teams Cork and Tipperary, who first played each other in 1888. It is a rivalry that has existed since the first provincial championship, however, it is less popular than its hurling counterpart. Cork's home ground is Páirc Uí Chaoimh and Tipperary's home ground is Semple Stadium.

While Cork have 37 Munster titles and Tipperary are ranked one below in third position on the roll of honour, they have also enjoyed success in the All-Ireland Senior Football Championship, having won 11 championship titles between them to date.

== Statistics ==
Team	All-Ireland	Munster	National League	Total
Cork	7	37	8	52
Tipperary	4	9	0	13
Combined	11	46	8	65

== All time results ==
=== Senior ===
Date	Winners	Score	Runners-up	Venue	Stage
27 May 1888	Tipperary	0-2 - 0-1	Tipperary	Buttevant	Munster quarter-final
29 September 1889	Tipperary	1-2 - 0-3	Tipperary	Mallow	Munster semi-final
1893	Cork	0-4 - 0-3	Tipperary	Charleville	Munster semi-final
3 December 1894	Cork	2-4 - 0-1	Tipperary	Charleville	Munster final
4 March 1895	Cork	0-6 - 0-2	Tipperary	Limerick	Munster final Replay
31 July 1898	Cork	0-5 - 1-0	Tipperary	Cork	Munster final
14 October 1900	Tippearary	2-1 - 0-1	Cork	Tipperary	Munster final
18 November 1900	Cork	1-2 - 0-1	Tipperary	Limerick	Munster final Replay
17 November 1901	Cork	3-11 - 0-1	Tipperary	Cork	Munster final 2nd Replay
3 November 1901	Tipperary	0-3 - 0-1	Cork	Fraher Field	Munster quarter-final
29 March 1903	Cork	2-3 - 0-6	Tipperary	Fraher Field	Munster semi-final
19 April 1904	Cork	1-5 - 0-4	Tipperary	Fraher Field	Munster semi-final
26 April 1908	Cork	1-7 - 0-1	Tipperary	Fraher Field	Munster final
17 July 1911	Cork	2-10 - 0-3	Tipperary	Fraher Field	Munster semi-final
9 July 1911	Cork	3-3 - 0-1	Tipperary	Kilmallock	Munster semi-final
9 May 1915	Tipperary	2-3 - 1-1	Cork	Waterford	Munster quarter-final
2 June 1918	Tipperary	1-5 - 0-2	Cork	Semple Stadium	Munster quarter-final
20 May 1923	Tipperary	2-2 - 2-1	Cork	Cork Athletic Grounds	Munster semi-final
5 August 1928	Cork	4-3 - 0-4	Tipperary	Fraher Field	Munster final
20 July 1930	Tipperary	6-2 - 1-3	Cork	Ned Hall Park	Munster semi-final
5 July 1931	Tipperary	2-11 - 3-1	Cork	Ned Hall Park	Munster semi-final
23 July 1933	Tipperary	2-9 - 2-2	Cork	Ned Hall Park	Munster semi-final
21 July 1935	Tipperary	2-8 - 1-2	Cork	Páirc Mac Gearailt	Munster final
4 June 1939	Tipperary	1-9 - 2-2	Cork	Mitchelstown	Munster quarter-final
19 May 1940	Tipperary	2-7 - 1-5	Cork	Mitchelstown	Munster quarter-final
25 July 1943	Cork	1-7 - 1-4	Tipperary	Páirc Mac Gearailt	Munster final
18 June 1944	Tipperary	1-9 - 1-3	Cork	Ned Hall Park	Munster semi-final
24 June 1945	Cork	1-7 - 1-6	Tipperary	Fraher Field	Munster semi-final
6 July 1947	Cork	2-3 - 1-2	Tipperary	Páirc Mac Gearailt	Munster semi-final
4 July 1948	Cork	0-12 - 0-3	Tipperary	Fraher Field	Munster semi-final
10 July 1949	Cork	4-2 - 2-4	Tipperary	Ned Hall Park	Munster semi-final
16 July 1950	Cork	3-5 - 0-3	Tipperary	Cork Athletic Grounds	Munster semi-final
6 July 1952	Cork	1-7 - 0-5	Tipperary	Ned Hall Park	Munster semi-final
4 July 1954	Cork	3-11 - 2-7	Tipperary	Cork Athletic Grounds	Munster semi-final
26 June 1955	Cork	2-8 - 0-7	Tipperary	Ned Hall Park	Munster semi-final
18 June 1961	Cork	2-9 - 2-4	Tipperary	Páirc Mac Gearailt	Munster semi-final
5 July 1970	Cork	2-15 - 3-9	Tipperary	Ned Hall Park	Munster semi-final
9 June 1974	Cork	3-14 - 2-2	Tipperary	Páirc Mac Gearailt	Munster semi-final
24 June 1979	Cork	2-18 - 0-5	Tipperary	Ned Hall Park	Munster semi-final
6 June 1982	Cork	1-19 - 1-5	Tipperary	Páirc Mac Gearailt	Munster semi-final
23 June 1985	Cork	4-19 - 1-10	Tippearary	Semple Stadium	Munster semi-final
25 June 1989	Cork	0-22 - 0-4	Tipperary	Páirc Uí Chaoimh	Munster semi-final
18 July 1993	Cork	1-16 - 1-8	Tipperary	Semple Stadium	Munster final
24 July 1994	Cork	2-19 - 3-9	Tipperary	Páirc Uí Chaoimh	Munster final
21 July 2002	Cork	2-11 - 1-14	Tipperary	Semple Stadium	Munster final
21 July 2002	Cork	1-23 - 0-7	Tipperary	Páirc Uí Chaoimh	Munster final Replay
3 June 2007	Cork	2-18 - 0-10	Tipperary	Gaelic Grounds	Munster semi-final
21 June 2014	Cork	0-16 - 1-11	Tipperary	Páirc Uí Chaoimh	Munster semi-final
12 June 2016	Tipperary	3-15 - 2-16	Cork	Semple Stadium	Munster semi-final
10 June 2017	Cork	1-10 - 1-9	Tipperary	Pairc Ui Rinn	Munster semi-final
26 May 2018	Cork	1-17 - 0-9	Tipperary	Semple Stadium	Munster semi-final
22 November 2020	Tipperary	0-17 - 0-14	Cork	Páirc Uí Chaoimh	Munster final
25 April 2026	Cork	4-18 - 1-12	Tipperary	Semple Stadium	Munster semi-final
