= 2002 All-Ireland Senior Football Championship =

Football championship

Championship details
- Dates: 5 May – 22 September 2002
- Teams: 33

All-Ireland Champions
- Winning team: Armagh (1st win)
- Captain: Kieran McGeeney
- Manager: Joe Kernan

All-Ireland Finalists
- Losing team: Kerry
- Captain: Darragh Ó Sé
- Manager: Páidí Ó Sé

Provincial Champions
- Munster: Cork
- Leinster: Dublin
- Ulster: Armagh
- Connacht: Galway

Championship statistics
- No. matches played: 67
- Goals total: 139 (2.11 per game)
- Points total: 1572 (23.82 per game)
- Top Scorer: Oisín McConville (1–40)
- Player of the Year: Kieran McGeeney

The 2002 All-Ireland Senior Football Championship was the 116th staging of the All-Ireland Senior Football Championship, the Gaelic Athletic Association's premier inter-county Gaelic football tournament. The championship began on 5 May 2002 and ended on 22 September 2002.

Galway entered the championship as the defending champions, however, they were defeated by Kerry in the All-Ireland quarter-final.

On 22 September 2002, Armagh won the championship following a 1–12 to 0–14 defeat of Kerry in the All-Ireland final. This was their first of two All-Ireland titles.

Armagh's Oisín McConville was the championship's top scorer with 1–40. His teammate Kieran McGeeney was the choice for the three Footballer of the Year awards.

== Format ==
The Qualifier Rounds system, first used in 2001 was again used in this year.

== Results ==
=== Connacht Senior Football Championship ===
Quarter-finals
Roscommon	1–08
Galway	3–12
New York	1–11
Sligo	1–19
London	0–10
Leitrim	0–15

Semi-finals
Galway	0–12
Mayo	1–07
Sligo	2–13
Leitrim	2–04

Final
Galway	1–11
Sligo	0–11

Quarter-finals

5 May 2002 Quarter-final	New York	1–11 – 1–19	Sligo	Gaelic Park, New York City
	M Slowey 1–5, K Lilly 0–4, J O'Driscoll 0–1, G Dowd 0–1.		G McGowan 0–8, M Brehony 1–3, T Brennan 0–3, D Sloyan 0–2, J McPartland 0–1, K Quinn 0–1, S Davey 0–1.	Attendance: 1,100; Referee: P McEneaney (Monaghan)

19 May 2002 Quarter-final	Roscommon	1–8 – 3–12	Galway	Dr. Hyde Park, Roscommon
	P Noone 1–1, F Dolan 0–3, N Dineen 0–2, S O'Neill 0–1, G Lohan 0–1.		A Kerins 2–0, P Joyce 0–6, D Savage 1–1, J Bergin 0–1, K Fitzgerald 0–1, M Donnellan 0–1, S Óg de Paor 0–1, P Clancy 0–1.	Attendance: 27,000; Referee: B Gorman (Armagh)

26 May 2002 Quarter-final	London	0–10 – 0–15	Leitrim	Emerald GAA Grounds, Ruislip
	S Lynch 0–4, C McHugh 0–2, J Grimes 0–2, A Gillane 0–1, P McDonagh 0–1.		O Maguire 0–5, P McLoughlin 0–4, M Duignan 0–2, G McCloskey 0–1, S Quinn 0–1, J Guckian 0–1, J Holohan 0–1.	Referee: M Hughes (County Tyrone)

Semi-finals

2 June 2002 Semi-final	Mayo	1–7 – 0–12	Galway	McHale Park, Castlebar
	C Mortimer 0–4, M Moyles 1–0, B Maloney 0–1, J Gill 0–1, T Mortimer 0–1.		P Joyce 0–4, P Clancy 0–3, M Donnellan 0–2, M Clancy 0–1, A Kerins 0–1, T Joyce 0–1.	Attendance: 24,000; Referee: N Barrett (Cork)

9 June 2002 Semi-final	Sligo	2–13 – 2–4	Leitrim	Markievicz Park, Sligo
	G McGowan 1–2, M Brehony 0–5, D Sloyan 1–0, D McGarty 0–2, E O'Hara 0–1, P Doohan 0–1, T Brennan 0–1, B Walsh 0–1.		F McBrien 1–0, S Quinn 1–0, O Maguire 0–2, P McLoughlin 0–2.	Attendance: 10,000; Referee: P Fox (Westmeath)

Final

30 June 2002 Final	Galway	1–11 – 0–11	Sligo	McHale Park, Castlebar
	P Joyce 0–5, D Savage 1–1, P Clancy 0–1, T Joyce 0–1, K Walsh 0–1, M Donnellan 0–1, M Clancy 0–1.		D Sloyan 0–4, G McGowan 0–3, D Durkin 0–2, E O'Hara 0–1, M Brehony 0–1.	Attendance: 14,000; Referee: J McKee (Armagh)

=== Munster Senior Football Championship ===
Quarter-finals
Clare	3–10
Waterford	2–09
Limerick	1–07
Kerry	0–14

Semi-finals
Clare	0–08
Tipperary	1–08
Cork	0–15
Kerry	1–09

Final
Tipperary	0–07
Cork	1–23

Quarter-finals

12 May 2002 Quarter-final	Limerick	1–7 – 0–14	Kerry	Gaelic Grounds, Limerick
	J Murphy 1–0, M Reidy 0–3, S Lucey 0–1, J Stokes 0–1, C Fitzgerald 0–1, J Quane 0–1.		A Mac Gearailt 0–4, MF Russell 0–4, J Crowley 0–2, N Kennelly 0–2, D Ó Cinnéide 0–1, C Cooper 0–1.	Attendance: 11,025; Referee: E Murtagh (Longford)

12 May 2002 Quarter-final	Waterford	2–9 – 3–10	Clare	Fraher Field, Dungarvan
	M Walsh 1–1, S Walsh 1–1, C Power 0–4, C Watt 0–2, R Hennessy 0–1.		D Russell 1–1, S Hickey 1–1, P Hehir 0–4, C Mullen 1–0, M O'Shea 0–2, D O'Driscoll 0–2.	Referee: E Whelan (Laois)

Semi-finals

9 June 2002 Semi-final	Tipperary	3–7 – 1–13	Clare	Fitzgerald Stadium, Killarney
	D Browne 2–4, P Lambert 1–2, L England 0–1.		C Mullen 0–6, D O'Driscoll 1–1, P Hehir 0–2, B Russell 0–2, M O'Shea 0–2.	Referee: M. Hughes (Tyrone)

16 June 2002 Semi-final replay	Tipperary	1–8 – 0–8	Clare	Gaelic Grounds, Limerick
	D Browne 0–6, P Lambert 1–0, B Cummins 0–1, L England 0–1.		P Gallagher 0–2, M O'Shea 0–2, C Mullen 0–2, G Quinlan 0–1, B Crowley 0–1.	Attendance: 1,300; Referee: G Lynch (Fermanagh)

16 June 2002 Semi-final	Kerry	0–8 – 0–8	Cork	Fitzgerald Stadium, Killarney
	MF Russell 0–6, D Ó Cinnéide 0–1, J Crowley 0–1.		C Corkery 0–5, BJ O'Sullivan 0–2, A Cronin 0–1.	Attendance: 30,245; Referee: J Bannon (Longford)

23 June 2002 Semi-final replay	Cork	0–15 – 1–9	Kerry	Páirc Uí Chaoimh, Cork
	C Corkery 0–6, F Murray 0–3, BJ O'Sullivan 0–2, A Cronin 0–1, M Ó Cróinín 0–1, P Clifford 0–1, D O'Sullivan 0–1.		MF Russell 1–1, D Ó Cinnéide 0–3, D Quill 0–2, S O'Sullivan 0–1, C Cooper 0–1, D Ó Sé 0–1.	Attendance: 22,568; Referee: B White (Wexford)

Finals

14 July 2002 Final	Tipperary	1–14 – 2–11	Cork	Semple Stadium, Thurles
	D Browne 0–8, P Lambert 0–3, B Hickey 1–0, N Kelly 0–1, L England 0–1, P Cahill 0–1.	Report; Report 2	C Corkery 0–7, BJ O'Sullivan 2–0, F Murray 0–2, N Murphy 0–1, P Clifford 0–1.	Attendance: 33,254; Referee: G Kinneavey (Roscommon); Man of the Match: Declan Browne (Moyle Rovers)

21 July 2002 Final replay	Cork	1–23 – 0–7	Tipperary	Páirc Uí Chaoimh, Cork
	C Corkery 0–11, F Murray 0–5, P Clifford 1–0, N Murphy 0–2, J Kavanagh 0–2, J Miskella 0–1, M Ó Cróinín 0–1, C Crowley 0–1.	Report	P Lambert 0–3, D Browne 0–2, L England 0–1, E Hanrahan 0–1.	Attendance: 17,708; Referee: M Monaghan (Kildare)

=== Ulster Senior Football Championship ===
Preliminary round
Cavan	0–15
Donegal	1–17

Quarter-finals
Monaghan	2–18
Fermanagh	4–13
Tyrone	0–16
Armagh	2–13
Down	1–06
Donegal	3–12
Antrim	0–06
Derry	0–16

Semi-finals
Fermanagh	1–05
Armagh	0–16
Donegal	1–09
Derry	0–10

Final
Armagh	1–14
Donegal	1–10

Preliminary round

12 May 2002 Preliminary round	Cavan	0–15 – 1–17	Donegal	Breffni Park, Cavan
	G Pearson 0–10, A Forde 0–2, L Reilly 0–1, P Reilly 0–1, B McCrudden 0–1.		B Devenney 0–7, A Sweeney 0–5, B Roper 1–0, M Hegarty 0–3, J McGuinness 0–1, K Cassidey 0–1.	Attendance: 15,000; Referee: P Russell (Tipperary)

Quarter-finals

12 May 2002 Quarter-final	Monaghan	2–11 – 4–13	Fermanagh	St Tiernach's Park, Clones
	T Freeman 1–3, D Freeman 0–4, R Woods 1–0, JP Mone 0–3, J McElroy 0–1.		Rory Gallagher 3–9, T Brewster 1–0, S McDermott 0–1, R Johnston 0–1, Raymond Gallagher 0–1, M McGrath 0–1.	Referee: M Monaghan (Kildare)

19 May 2002 Quarter-final	Armagh	1–12 – 1–12	Tyrone	St Tiernach's Park, Clones
	O McConville 0–7, S McDonnell 1–1, R Clarke 0–2, J McEntee 0–1, P McKeever 0–1.		S Kavanagh 1–2, P Canavan 0–4, K Hughes 0–2, R McMenamin 0–2, S O'Neill 0–1, D McCrossan 0–1.	Attendance: 31,937; Referee: J Bannon (Longford)

26 May 2002 Quarter-final replay	Armagh	2–13 – 0–16	Tyrone	St Tiernach's Park, Clones
	P McKeever 0–5, J McEntee 1–1, B Duffy 1–0, O McConville 0–3, S McDonnell 0–2, R Clarke 0–1, D Marsden 0–1.		S O'Neill 0–7, K Hughes 0–2, S Cavanagh 0–2, C McAnallen 0–2, R McMenamin 0–1, B McGuigan 0–1, D McCrossan 0–1.	Attendance: 30,158; Referee: B White (Wexford)

2 June 2002 Quarter-final	Antrim	0–6 – 0–16	Derry	Casement Park, Belfast
	P Logan 0–2, M McCrory 0–1, P McCann 0–1, K Brady 0–1, K Madden 0–1.		G Diamond 0–6, P Bradley 0–5, E. Muldoon 0–2, P McFlynn 0–1, G McGonigle 0–1, J McBride 0–1.	Referee: P Horan (Offaly)

2 June 2002 Quarter-final	Donegal	3–12 – 1–6	Down	MacCumhaill Park, Ballybofey
	A Sweeney 1–5, B Devenney 1–4, B Roper 1–1, J Gildea 0–1, J McGuinness 0–1.		J McCartan 1–0, M Linden 0–2, R Murtagh 0–1, R Sexton 0–1, S King 0–1, B Coulter 0–1.	Attendance: 8,000; Referee: G Kinneavey (Roscommon)

Semi-finals

9 June 2002 Semi-final	Armagh	0–16 – 1–5	Fermanagh	St Tiernach's Park, Clones
	O McConville 0–5, D Marsden 0–3, S McDonnell 0–2, P McGrane 0–2, R Clarke 0–1, C O'Rourke 0–1, B O'Hagan 0–1, P McKeever 0–1.		Rory Gallagher 1–3, Raymond Gallagher 0–1, T Brewster 0–1.	Attendance: 20,540; Referee: P Russell (Tipperary)

16 June 2002 Semi-final	Donegal	1–9 – 0–10	Derry	St Tiernach's Park, Clones
	A Sweeney 1–3, C Toye 0–2, B Roper 0–1, J McGuinness 0–1, P McGonigle 0–1, B Devenney 0–1.		G Diamond 0–4, P Bradley 0–3, A Tohill 0–1, J McBride 0–1, E. Muldoon 0–1.	Attendance: 4,000; Referee: M Collins (Cork)

Final

7 July 2002 Final	Armagh	1–14 – 1–10	Donegal	St Tiernach's Park, Clones
	O McConville 0–5, J McEntee 1–0, S McDonnell 0–3, R Clarke 0–3, D Marsden 0–1, P McGrane 0–1, A O'Rourke 0–1.		A Sweeney 0–4, J McGuinness 1–0, B Devenney 0–3, C Toye 0–2, P McGonigle 0–1.	Attendance: 30,219; Referee: S McCormack (Meath)

=== Leinster Senior Football Championship ===
1st Round
Longford	1–12
Louth	3–17
Laois	3–06
Wicklow	0–08
Westmeath	0–14
Carlow	1–10

Quarter-finals
Louth	0–11
Kildare	0–12
Laois	2–06
Offaly	0–13
Westmeath	0–11
Meath	1–12
Dublin	0–15
Wexford	1–10

Semi-finals
Kildare	3–09
Offaly	1–14
Meath	0–10
Dublin	2–11

Final
Kildare	2–11
Dublin	2–13

First round

5 May 2002 First round	Louth	1–14 – 2–11	Longford	Páirc Tailteann, Navan
	JP Rooney 1–2, C Grimes 0–5, M Stanfield 0–3, O McDonnell 0–1, D Reilly 0–1, C Quinn 0–1, B Clarke 0–1.		P Barden 1–2, T SMullen 1–1, P Davis 0–4, D Barden 0–2, E Barden 0–2.	Referee: M McGrath (Donegal)

6 May 2002 First round	Laois	3–6 – 0–8	Wicklow	Dr. Cullen Park, Carlow
	B McDonald 1–1, C Conway 1–1, M Lawlor 1–0, I Fitzgerald 0–2, D McEvoy 0–1, G Ramsbottom 0–1.		P Dalton 0–4, S O'Neill 0–2, G Doran 0–1, J Behan 0–1.	Attendance: 3,000; Referee: G Kinneavey (Roscommon)

12 May 2002 First round replay	Louth	3–17 – 1–12	Longford	Páirc Tailteann, Navan
	O McDonnell 1–4, D Reilly 1–3, M Stanfield 1–3, C Grimes 0–4, P McGinnity 0–1, J Neary 0–1, JP Rooney 0–1.		P Davis 0–6, P Barden 1–2, D Blessington 0–1, L Keenan 0–1, R Clyne 0–1, E Barden 0–1.	Attendance: 6,000; Referee: M Collins (Cork)

12 May 2002 First round	Westmeath	1–14 – 0–10	Carlow	O'Moore Park, Portlaoise
	JP Casey 0–8, S Colleary 1–1, D Dolan 0–2, K Ryan 0–1, B Morley 0–1, M Ennis 0–1.		B Kelly 0–4, G Ware 0–2, M Carpenter 0–2, T Walsh 0–2.	Attendance: 7,000; Referee: O Ryan (Laois)

Quarter-finals

26 May 2002 Quarter-final	Offaly	0–13 – 2–6	Laois	O'Connor Park, Tullamore
	C Quinn 0–5, C McManus 0–3, P Kelleghan 0–3, A McNamee 0–1, R Malone 0–1.		C Conway 1–3, B McDonald 1–1, P Clancy 0–1, S Kelly 0–1.	Attendance: 11,000; Referee: M Conway (Derry)

26 May 2002 Quarter-final	Kildare	0–12 – 0–11	Louth	Cusack Park, Mullingar
	K O'Dwyer 0–4, M Lynch 0–3, D McCormack 0–1, J Doyle 0–1, R Sweeney 0–1, T Fennin 0–1, K Brennan 0–1.		M Stanfield 0–5, O McDonnell 0–3, JP Rooney 0–1, D Reilly 0–1, C Grimes 0–1.	Attendance: 9,000; Referee: D Joyce (Galway)

1 June 2002 Quarter-final	Dublin	0–15 – 1–10	Wexford	Dr. Cullen Park, Carlow
	R Cosgrove 0–5, C Moran 0–2, J Sherlock 0–2, C Whelan 0–2, S Connell 0–1, A Brogan 0–1, D Farrell 0–1, P Curran 0–1.		R Barry 1–2, M Forde 0–4, L O'Brien 0–4,	Attendance: 12,500; Referee: B Crowe (Cavan)

2 June 2002 Quarter-final	Meath	1–12 – 0–11	Westmeath	O'Moore Park, Portlaoise
	T Giles 0–6, E Kelly 1–2, G Geraghty 0–2, D Curtis 0–1, P Shankey 0–1.		JP Casey 0–7, F Wilson 0–1, D O'Shaughnessy 0–1, K Keane 0–1, G Heavin 0–1.	Attendance: 18,000; Referee: M Collins (Cork)

Semi-finals

16 June 2002 Semi-final	Kildare	1–9 – 1–9	Offaly	Nowlan Park, Kilkenny
	T Fennin 1–0, M Lynch 0–3, D Doyle 0–2, R Sweeney 0–1, D Earley 0–1, P Hurley 0–1, E McCormack 0–1.		C McManus 1–2, C Quinn 0–2, A McNamee 0–1, P Kelleghan 0–1, J Grennan 0–1, V Claffey 0–1, B Mooney 0–1.	Attendance: 13,000; Referee: S Prior (Leitrim)

22 June 2002 Semi-final replay	Kildare	3–9 – 1–14 (aet)	Offaly	Nowlan Park, Kilkenny
	R Sweeney 1–1, E McCormack 1–1, D Earley 1–0, J Doyle 0–3, T Fennin 0–2, M Lynch 0–1, P Murray 0–1.		C McManus 1–6, R Malone 0–3, K SLattery 0–2, C Quinn 0–2, J Grennan 0–1.	Attendance: 10,000; Referee: P Russell (Tipperary)

23 June 2002 Semi-final	Dublin	2–11 – 0–10	Meath	Croke Park, Dublin
	R Cosgrove 2–3, C Moran 0–4, A Brogan 0–3, D Homan 0–1.		E Kelly 0–2, G Geraghty 0–2, R Magee 0–2, N Crawford 0–1, N Nestor 0–1, T Giles 0–1, O Murphy 0–1.	Attendance: 65,898; Referee: P McEneaney (Monaghan)

Final

14 July 2002 Final	Dublin	2–13 – 2–11	Kildare	Croke Park, Dublin
	R Cosgrove 1–4, A Brogan 1–2, J McNally 0–3, S Connell 0–2, C Whelan 0–1, P Christie 0–1.		T Fenning 2–2, J Doyle 0–7, K O'Dwyer 0–1, P Murray 0–1.	Attendance: 78,033; Referee: M Collins (Cork)

=== All-Ireland Qualifiers ===
Round 1

8 June 2002 Round 1	Waterford	3–11 – 3–19	Roscommon	Fraher Field, Dungarvan
	S Walsh 1–2, G Hurney 0–4, M Walsh 1–0, C Watt 1–0, C Power 0–3, R Power 0–1, R Hennessy 0–1.		S Lohan 1–6, J Dunning 1–2, M Rafferty 1–0, G Lohan 0–3, N Dineen 0–3, J Hanley 0–2, G Ox 0–1, A McPadden 0–1, F Dolan 0–1.	Referee: B Duff (Kildare)

8 June 2002 Round 1	Wicklow	2–22 – 2–6	London	Aughrim County Ground, Aughrim
	A Nolan 1–8, T Gill 0–5, J Behan 1–1, S O'Neill 0–2, T Doyle 0–2, B Mernagh 0–2, P Dalton 0–1, B Whelan 0–1.		S Lynch 1–3, K Scanlon 1–0, P Coggins 0–1, C Heaney 0–1, M Donagh 0–1.	Referee: C Broderick (Down)

8 June 2002 Round 1	Carlow	0–11 – 0–18	Laois	Dr Cullen Park, Carlow
	B Kelly 0–4, M Carpenter 0–3, B Carbery 0–3, W Quinlan 0–1.		C Conway 0–6, S Kelly 0–6, I Fitzgerald 0–2, B McDonald 0–2, G Ramsbottom 0–1, M Lawlor 0–1.	Referee: M Ryan (Limerick)

8 June 2002 Round 1	Wexford	0–10 – 1–9	Tyrone	Wexford Park, Wexford
	M Forde 0–4, L O'Brien 0–3, P Carley 0–1, J Hegarty 0–1, J Lawlor 0–1.		K Hughes 1–1, P Canavan 0–4, B Dooher 0–2, S O'Neill 0–1, G Cavlan 0–1.	Referee: S Prior (Leitrim)

8 June 2002 Round 1	Monaghan	1–8 – 2–11	Louth	St. Tiernach's Park, Clones
	T Freeman 1–1, S McManus 0–3, D Freeman 0–2, E Lennon 0–1, R Ronaghan 0–1.		D Reilly 1–2, D Stanfield 0–5, JP Rooney 1–1, J Neary 0–1, S O'Hanlon 0–1, M Farrelly 0–1.	Referee: J Geaney (Cork)

8 June 2002 Round 1	Longford	1–16 – 0–14	Down	Pearse Park, Longford
	P Davis 0–6, P Barden 0–5, D Barden 1–1, A O'Connor 0–2, T Smullen 0–1, P Ross 0–1.		L Doyle 0–4, M Walsh 0–3, B Coulter 0–2, S King 0–2, R Murtagh 0–1, J McCartan 0–1, P McConville 0–1.	Referee: A Mangan (Kerry)

8 June 2002 Round 1	Antrim	1–10 – 0–14	Westmeath	Casement Park, Belfast
	K Madden 0–7, K Brady 1–0, P McCann 0–1, E McCann 0–1, K Doyle 0–1.		D Dolan 0–6, M Ennis 0–3, JP Casey 0–2, B Morley 0–1, M Flangan 0–1, F Wilson 0–1.	Referee: H Beirne (Roscommon)

8 June 2002 Round 1	Cavan	2–12 – 1–15	Limerick	Breffni Park, Cavan
	L Reilly 1–2, F O'Reilly 0–4, G Pearson 0–4, P McKenna 1–0, P Reilly 0–1, D McCabe 0–1.		M Reidy 1–9, C Mullane 0–2, J Quane 0–1, C Fitzgerald 0–1, J Stokes 0–1, S Kelly 0–1.	Referee: J Smith (Meath)

15 June 2002 Round 1 replay	Cavan	0–11 – 2–8	Limerick	Breffni Park, Cavan
	F O'Reilly 0–2, L Reilly 0–1, J Reilly 0–1, D McCabe 0–1, G Pearson 0–1, P Galligan 0–1, P Reilly 0–1, A Forde 0–1, P McKenna 0–1, E Reilly 0–1.		M Reidy 0–5, J Murphy 1–1, C Mullane 1–0, S Lucey 0–1, P Ahern 0–1.	Referee: D Joyce (Galway)

Round 2

22 June 2002 Round 2	Westmeath	0–7 – 0–14	Fermanagh	Cusack Park, Mullingar
	F Wilson 0–4, JP Casey 0–2, M Flanagan 0–1.		Raymond Gallagher 0–6, Rory Gallagher 0–4, T Brewster 0–2, C Donnelly 0–1, R Johnston 0–1.	Attendance: 6,128; Referee: M Ryan (Limerick)

22 June 2002 Round 2	Laois	1–19 – 1–6	Clare	O'Moore Park, Portlaoise
	S Kelly 0–9, C Conway 1–3, G Ramsbottom 0–2, M Lawlor 0–2, G Kavanagh 0–1, I Fitzgerald 0–1, P Clancy 0–1.		C Mullen 1–1, M O'Dwyer 0–3, D O'Driscoll 0–1, P Hehir 0–1.	Referee: S McGonigle (Donegal)

23 June 2002 Round 2	Mayo	0–20 – 2–8	Roscommon	McHale Park, Castlebar
	C Mortimer 0–6, T Mortimer 0–3, J Gill 0–3, D Tiernan 0–3, B Maloney 0–2, M Moyles 0–1, J Horan 0–1, D Brady 0–1.		N Dineen 2–4, G Lohan 0–2, S O'Neill 0–1, J Dunning 0–1.	Attendance: 6,000; Referee: M Monaghan (Kildare)

23 June 2002 Round 2	Longford	0–9 – 2–13	Derry	Pearse Park, Longford
	P Davis 0–6, D Barden 0–1, P Barden 0–1, A O'Connor 0–1.		A Tohill 2–1, G Diamond 0–6, D Dougan 0–2, J McBride 0–2, F Crossan 0–1, P Bradley 0–1.	Referee: N Barrett (Cork)

29 June 2002 Round 2	Meath	3–8 – 2–9	Louth	Páirc Tailteann, Navan
	R Kealy 2–0, G Geraghty 1–0, N Crawford 0–3, T Giles 0–2, E Kelly 0–1, R Magee 0–1, Traynor 0–1.		O McDonnell 1–1, JP Rooney 1–1, M Stanford 0–3, B Clarke 0–1, S O'Hanlon 0–1, S Gerard 0–1, D Reilly 0–1.	Attendance: 20,000; Referee: B Gorman (Armagh)

29 June 2002 Round 2	Tyrone	1–22 – 0–7	Leitrim	Páirc Seán Mac Diarmada, Carrick-on-Shannon
	B McGuigan 1–2, S O'Neill 0–5, B McGuckian 0–4, Peter Canavan 0–3, C McAnallen 0–2, G Cavlan 0–2, R McMenamin 0–1, C McGlinchey 0–1, O Mulligan 0–1, S Cavanagh 0–1.		O Maguire 0–3, D Brennan 0–1, S Quinn 0–1, J Guckian 0–1, J Holohan 0–1.	Referee: E Whelan

30 June 2002 Round 2	Kerry	5–15 – 0–7	Wicklow	O'Moore Park, Portlaoise
	E Brosnan 2–2, MF Russell 1–3, L Hassett 1–0, M Ó Sé 1–0, D Ó Cinnéide 0–3, S O'Sullivan 0–2, I Twiss 0–2, S Scanlon 0–1, J Crowley 0–1, C Cooper 0–1.		T Gill 0–4, P Dalton 0–2, A Nolan 0–1.	Attendance: 2,500; Referee: M McGrath (Donegal)

6 July 2002 Round 2	Limerick	3–9 – 2–7	Offaly	Gaelic Grounds, Limerick
	S Kelly 1–2, M Reidy 1–1, P Ahern 1–0, J Murphy 0–3, J Galvin 0–1, D Reidy 0–1, C Fitzgerald 0–1.		N Coughlan 1–1, C Quinn 0–4, S Grennan 1–0, P Kellaghan 0–1, B Malone 0–1.	Attendance: 5,624; Referee: D Joyce (Galway)

Round 3

6 July 2002 Round 3	Kerry	2–15 – 0–4	Fermanagh	O'Moore Park, Portlaoise
	D Ó Cinnéide 0–6, L Hassett 1–0, C Cooper 1–0, E Brosnan 0–3, S O'Sullivan 0–2, J Crowley 0–2, D Ó Sé 0–1, R O'Connor 0–1.		Raymond Gallagher 0–2, Rory Gallagher 0–2.	Attendance: 15,000; Referee: M Monaghan (Kildare)

6 July 2002 Round 3	Meath	1–15 – 0–7	Laois	O'Moore Park, Portlaoise
	O Murphy 1–3, H Traynor 0–6, G Geraghty 0–4, T Giles 0–2.		C Conway 0–3, P Clancy 0–1, S Kelly 0–1, D Conroy 0–1, K Kelly 0–1.	Attendance: 15,000; Referee: P Russell (Tipperary)

6 July 2002 Round 3	Tyrone	1–17 – 1–12	Derry	Casement Park, Belfast
	Peter Canavan 0–7, S O'Neill 0–6, C Holmes 1–0, B Dooher 0–2, C McAnallen 0–1, G Cavlan 0–1.		A Tohill 0–7, P Bradley 1–2, D Heaney 0–1, G McGonigle 0–1, F Doherty 0–1.	Attendance: 12,000; Referee: B White (Wexford)

14 July 2002 Round 3	Mayo	0–13 – 1–9	Limerick	Dr. Hyde Park, Roscommon
	C Mortimer 0–4, J Horan 0–3, T Mortimer 0–1, C McManamon 0–1, D Brady 0–1, B Maloney 0–1, D Heaney 0–1, T Gill 0–1.		M Reidy 0–5, J Stokes 1–0, P Ahern 0–2, C Mullane 0–1, J Quane 0–1.	Attendance: 15,000; Referee: B Crowe (Cavan)

Round 4

21 July 2002 Round 4	Donegal	1–13 – 0–14	Meath	Croke Park, Dublin
	B Devenney 0–5, C Toye 1–1, A Sweeney 0–4, J McGuinness 0–1, M Hegarty 0–1, B Roper 0–1.		O Murphy 0–2, T Giles 0–2, G Geraghty 0–2, R Kealy 0–2, N Crawford 0–2, N Nestor 0–1, J Cullinane 0–1, A Kenny 0–1, D Curtis 0–1.	Attendance: 43,682; Referee: M Collins (Cork)

21 July 2002 Round 4	Sligo	1–14 – 0–12	Tyrone	Croke Park, Dublin
	D Sloyan 1–3, D McGarty 0–4, E O'Hara 0–3, K Quinn 0–1, K Durkan 0–1, G McGowan 0–1, M Brehony 0–1.		Peter Canavan 0–7, Pascal Canavan 0–2, S O'Neill 0–1, B McGuigan 0–1, C McAnallen 0–1.	Attendance: 43,682; Referee: J Bannon (Longford)

27 July 2002 Round 4	Kerry	2–10 – 1–5	Kildare	Semple Stadium, Thurles
	E Brosnan 1–1, C Cooper 1–1, D Ó Cinnéide 0–4, L Hassett 0–1, S O'Sullivan 0–1, J Sheehan 0–1, J Crowley 0–1.		J Doyle 0–4, D Earley 1–0, P Hurley 0–1.	Attendance: 18,210; Referee: G Kinneavey (Roscommon)

28 July 2002 Round 4	Mayo	0–21 – 1–14	Tipperary	Cusack Park, Ennis
	J Horan 0–5, C McDonald 0–4, D Brady 0–4, S Carolan 0–3, T Mortimer 0–2, B Maloney 0–1, J Gill 0–1, C McMenamon 0–1.		P Lambert 1–4, D Browne 0–7, B Hickey 0–1, M England 0–1, F O'Callaghan 0–1.	Attendance: 8,000; Referee: M McGrath (Donegal)

=== All-Ireland Senior Football Championship ===
Quarter-finals
Cork	1–16
Mayo	1–10
Kerry	2–17
Galway	1–12
Dublin	1–14
Donegal	0–07
Armagh	1–16
Sligo	0–17

Semi-finals
Cork	2–07
Kerry	3–19
Dublin	1–13
Armagh	1–14

Final
Kerry	0–14
Armagh	1–12

Quarter-finals

4 August 2002 Quarter-final	Kerry	2–17 – 1–12	Galway	Croke Park, Dublin
	S O'Sullivan 1–1, A Mac Gearailt 1–1, C Cooper 0–4, MF Russell 0–4, D Ó Cinnéide 0–3, T Ó Sé 0–1, J Sheehan 0–1, D Ó Sé 0–1, E Brosnan 0–1.	Report	P Joyce 0–6, M Donnellan 1–0, D Savage 0–2, K Walsh 0–1, J Bergin 0–1, M Clancy 0–1, M Colleran 0–1.	Attendance: 59,252; Referee: P McEneaney (Monaghan)

4 August 2002 Quarter-final	Armagh	2–9 – 0–15	Sligo	Croke Park, Dublin
	O McConville 0–6, S McDonnell 1–0, D Marsden 1–0, J McEntee 0–2, B O'Hagan 0–1.		D Sloyan 0–6, K Quinn 0–2, J McPartland 0–2, D McGarty 0–2, G McGowan 0–1, P Doohan 0–1, B Phillips 0–1.	Attendance: 59,252; Referee: P Russell (Tipperary)

5 August 2002 Quarter-final	Cork	0–16 – 1–10	Mayo	Croke Park, Dublin
	C Corkery 0–6, BJ O'Sullivan 0–4, C Crowley 0–2, J Kavanagh 0–1, P Clifford 0–1, G Canty 0–1, D O'Sullivan 0–1.		C McDonald 1–3, T Mortimer 0–3, S Fitzmaurice 0–1, D Brady 0–1, J Horan 0–1, B Maloney 0–1.	Attendance: 77,298; Referee: J Bannon (Longford)

5 August 2002 Quarter-final	Dublin	2–8 – 0–14	Donegal	Croke Park, Dublin
	R Cosgrove 2–2, C Whelan 0–1, S Ryan 0–1, S Connell 0–1, A Brogan 0–1, J McNally 0–1, D Magee 0–1.		A Sweeney 0–5, B Devenney 0–4, D Diver 0–2, P McGonigle 0–1, J Gildea 0–1, J McGuinness 0–1.	Attendance: 77,298; Referee: G Kinneavey (Roscommon)

17 August 2002 Quarter-final replay	Dublin	1–14 – 0–7	Donegal	Croke Park, Dublin
	R Cosgrove 1–3, C Whelan 0–4, A Brogan 0–2, S Connell 0–2, J Magee 0–1, J McNally 0–1, P Christie 0–1.		B Devenney 0–2, A Sweeney 0–2, B Roper 0–1, M Hegarty 0–1, K Rafferty 0–1.	Attendance: 79,057; Referee: P McEneaney (Monaghan)

18 August 2002 Quarter-final replay	Armagh	1–16 – 0–17	Sligo	Páirc Tailteann, Navan
	O McConville 0–7, R Clarke 1–2, S McDonnell 0–4, B O'Hagan 0–2, P McGrane 0–1.		D Sloyan 0–8, G McGowan 0–3, J McPartland 0–3, E O'Hara 0–2, S DAvey 0–1.	Attendance: 22,000; Referee: S McCormack (Meath)

Semi-finals

25 August 2002 Semi-final	Kerry	3–19 – 2–7	Cork	Croke Park, Dublin
	MF Russell 1–6, C Cooper 1–5, S Levis 1–0 (won goal), D Ó Cinnéide 0–3, L Hassett 0–2, S O'Sullivan 0–1, D Ó Sé 0–1, A Mac Gearailt 0–1.		C Corkery 0–5, F Murray 1–1, P CLifford 1–0, J O'Donoghue 0–1.	Attendance: 46,515; Referee: B White (Wexford)

1 September 2002 Semi-final	Armagh	1–14 – 1–13	Dublin	Croke Park, Dublin
	P McKeever 1–2, O McConville 0–5, J McEntee 0–3, S McDonnell 0–2, R Clarke 0–2.	Report	R Cosgrove 0–6, C Whelan 1–1, S Connell 0–2, A Brogan 0–2, D Magee 0–1, C Moran 0–1.	Attendance: 79,386; Referee: M Collins (Cork)

Final

22 September 2002 Final	Armagh	1–12 – 0–14	Kerry	Croke Park, Dublin
	O McConville 1–2 (1f, 1 '45), S McDonnell, D Marsden, R Clarke 0–3 each, J McEntee 0–1.	Report	D Ó Cinnéide 0–5 (3f, 1 '45), MF Russell 0–3, L Hassett, C Cooper 0–2, E Brosnan, E Fitzmaurice 0–1 each.	Attendance: 79,500; Referee: J Bannon (Longford)

== Championship statistics ==
=== Top scorers ===
Overall

Rank	Player	County	Tally	Total	Matches	Average
1	Oisín McConville	Armagh	1–40	43	8	5.37
2	Ray Cosgrove	Dublin	6–23	41	6	6.83
3	Colin Corkery	Cork	0–40	40	6	6.66
4	Mike Frank Russell	Kerry	3–27	36	9	4.00
5	Adrian Sweeney	Donegal	2–28	34	7	4.85
6	Declan Browne	Tipperary	2–27	33	5	6.6
7	Rory Gallagher	Fermanagh	4–18	30	4	7.50
8	Michael Reidy	Limerick	2–23	29	5	5.80
8	Dessie Sloyan	Sligo	2–23	29	6	4.83
8	Brendan Devenney	Donegal	1–26	29	7	4.14
8	Dara Ó Cinnéide	Kerry	0–29	29	9	3.22

Single game

Rank	Player	County	Tally	Total	Opposition
1	Rory Gallagher	Fermanagh	3–9	18	Monaghan
2	Michael Reidy	Limerick	1–9	12	Cavan
3	Anthony Nolan	Wicklow	1–8	11	London
3	Colin Corkery	Cork	0–11	11	Tipperary
5	Nigel Dineen	Roscommon	2–4	10	Mayo
5	Declan Browne	Tipperary	2–4	10	Clare
5	Gerald Pearson	Cavan	0–10	10	Donegal
8	Ray Cosgrove	Dublin	2–3	9	Meath
8	Mike Frank Russell	Kerry	1–6	9	Cork
8	Stephen Lohan	Roscommon	1–6	9	Waterford
8	Ciaran McManus	Offaly	1–6	9	Kildare
8	Stephen Kelly	Laois	0–9	9	Clare

=== Miscellaneous ===
- This year New York in their fourth season in the Connacht championship are give home ground.
- Sligo play Leitrim in the Connacht championship for the first time since 1991.
- There was a triple of draws & replays in the Munster football championship in the 2 semi-finals between Clare vs Tipperary and Cork vs Kerry also final between Cork vs Tipperary making the largest of modern times.
- Galway and Sligo meet in the Connacht final for the first time since 1971.
- During the course of the championship there were a number of first-time championship meetings.
  - Waterford V Roscommon
  - Wicklow V London
  - Wexford V Tyrone
  - Monaghan V Louth
  - Longford V Down
  - Antrim V Westmeath
  - Cavan V Limerick
  - Westmeath V Fermanagh
  - Longford V Derry
  - Tyrone V Leitrim
  - Kerry V Wicklow
  - Limerick V Offaly
  - Kerry V Fermanagh
  - Mayo V Limerick
  - Sligo V Tyrone
  - Armagh V Sligo
- The All-Ireland qualifiers saw Tipperary face Mayo in the championship for the first time since 1920.
- Armagh qualified for the All-Ireland final for the first time since 1977. They became the 18th team to win the All-Ireland title.
