= Sean Ward =

Irish Gaelic footballer

Personal information
- Native name: Seán Mac an Bhaird (Irish)
- Born: Newry, County Down, Northern Ireland
- Height: 6 ft 2 in (188 cm)

Sport
- Sport: Gaelic Football
- Position: Midfield
Club
- Years: Club
- Burren
Club titles
- Down titles: 2
Inter-county
- Years: County
- 1996-2005: Down

Sean Ward (born 18 April 1976) is an Irish Gaelic footballer who played for Down in the 1990s and 2000s.

== Club ==
Ward played his club football for his home club St Mary's, Burren, winning two Down Senior Football Championships in 1996 and 1997.

== Intercounty ==
Ward made his debut in the 1996/1997 National Football League against Longford.

He captained his county to the 2003 Ulster Final which, following a replay, Down lost to Tyrone.

== Management ==
Ward was appointed Burren senior manager in 2014, having led the Under-21s to five county titles in a row as well as two Ulster titles.

He subsequently went on to manage St John's and Saval.
