= Christy Byrne =

Irish Gaelic footballer

Personal information
- Native name: Criostóir Ó Broin (Irish)
- Born: 1971 (age 54–55) County Kildare, Ireland

Sport
- Sport: Gaelic football
- Position: Goalkeeper
Club
- Years: Club
- ?-: Castlemitchell
Inter-county
- Years: County
- 1994–2003: Kildare
Inter-county titles
- Leinster titles: 2

Christy Byrne (born 1971 in County Kildare, Ireland) is a former Irish sportsperson. He played Gaelic football with his local club Castlemitchell and was a member of the Kildare senior inter-county team from 1994 to 2003.
