= 2001 Ulster Senior Football Championship =

Gaelic football tournament

2001 Ulster SFC
Tournament details
- Province: Ulster
- Year: 2001
- Trophy: Anglo-Celt Cup
- Date: 13 May 2001 - 8 July 2001
- Teams: 9
- Defending champions: Armagh

Winners
- Champions: Tyrone (9th win)
- Manager: Eugene McKenna and Art McRory
- Captain: Sean Teague

Runners-up
- Runners-up: Cavan
- Manager: Val Andrews
- Captain: Peter Reilly

Other
- Matches played: 9

The 2001 Ulster Senior Football Championship was the 113th installment of the annual Ulster Senior Football Championship organised by Ulster GAA. It was one of the four provincial competitions of the 2001 All-Ireland Senior Football Championship.

Tyrone won their ninth title overall and their first title since 1995 beating Cavan in the final.

== Teams ==
=== General Information ===
Nine counties competed in the Ulster Senior Football Championship:

County	Last Championship Title	Last All-Ireland Title	Position in 2000 Championship	Sponsor
Antrim	1951	—	Semi-finals	Bushmills
Armagh	2000	—	Champions	Morgan Fuels
Cavan	1997	1952	Quarter-finals	Kingspan
Derry	1998	1993	Runners-Up	Sperrin Metal
Donegal	1992	1992	Quarter-finals	Abbey Hotel
Down	1994	1994	Quarter-finals	Canal Court Hotel
Fermanagh	—	—	Semi-finals	Tracey Concrete
Monaghan	1988	—	Preliminary Round	Harte Peat
Tyrone	1995	—	Quarter-finals	W.J. Dolan

== Championship Draw ==
Preliminary round
Donegal	0-11
Fermanagh	1-09

Quarter-finals
Antrim	0-09
Derry	1-11
Armagh	1-09
Tyrone	1-14
Down	2-10
Cavan	1-14
Fermanagh	0-14
Monaghan	2-10

Semi-finals
Derry	0-14
Tyrone	3-07
Cavan	0-13
Monaghan	0-11

Final
Tyrone	1-13
Cavan	1-11

== Preliminary round ==
13 May 2001 Preliminary round	Donegal	1-16 - 2-13	Fermanagh	MacCumhaill Park, Ballybofey
	A Sweeney 1-3, B Devenney 0-6, M Hegarty 0-2, M Crossan 0-1, P McGonigle 0-1, J Gallagher 0-1, B Roper 0-1, T Boyle 0-1.		S Maguire 1-5, Rory Gallagher 0-6, M O’Donnell 1-0, K Donnelly 0-1, S King 0-1.	Referee: S Prior (Leitrim)

19 May 2001 Preliminary round replay	Fermanagh	1-9 - 0-11	Donegal	Brewster Park, Enniskillen
	R Gallagher 0-7, M O’Donnell 1-0, T Brewster 0-1, K Donnelly 0-1.	Report	A Sweeney 0-3, B Roper 0-2, M Hegerty 0-2, J Gildea 0-1, P McGonigle 0-1, J McGuinness 0-1, B Devenney 0-1.

== Quarter-finals ==
20 May 2001 Quarter-final	Tyrone	1-14 - 1-9	Armagh	St Tiernach's Park, Clones
	S O’Neill 0-5, O Mulligan 1-0, B Dooher 0-2, Peter Canavan 0-2, Pascal Canavan 0-1, G Cavlan 0-1, D McCrossan 0-1, C McAnallen 0-1, B McGuigan 0-1.	Report	S McDonnell 1-2, O McConville 0-4, D Marsden 0-2, C O’Rourke 0-1.	Referee: J Bannon (Longford)

27 May 2001 Quarter-final	Down	2-10 - 1-14	Cavan	Casement Park, Belfast
	M Walsh 1-4, M Linden 1-1, L Doyle 0-2, S Ward 0-2, S Mulholland 0-1.	Report	P Reilly 0-4, J Reilly 1-0, M Graham 0-2, P Galligan 0-2, D McCabe 0-2, D McCrudden 0-1, E Jackson 0-1, F O’Reilly 0-1, L Reilly 0-1.	Referee: S McCormack (Meath)

3 June 2001 Quarter-final	Derry	1-11 - 0-9	Antrim	Celtic Park, Derry
	P. Bradley 1-3, E. Muldoon 0-4, G. Coleman 0-1, A. Tohill 0-1, D. Heaney 0-1, G. Diamond 0-1.	Report	P. Logan 0-8, K. Brady 0-1.	Referee: P O'Toole (Longford)

10 June 2001 Quarter-final	Fermanagh	0-14 - 2-10	Monaghan	Brewster Park, Enniskillen
	Rory Gallagher 0-8, T Brewster 0-4, K Donnelly 0-1, M O’Donnell 0-1.	Report	C Tavey 1-3, R Ronaghan 1-0, J McElroy 0-2, D Farmer 0-2, G Meehan 0-1, D Smyth 0-1, T Freeman 0-1.	Referee: M Curley (Galway)

== Semi-finals ==
17 June 2001 Semi-final	Tyrone	3-7 - 0-14	Derry	St Tiernach's Park, Clones
	S O’Neill 1-2, G Cavlan 1-1, B Dooher 1-0, R McMenamin 0-1, C McAnallen 0-1, E Mulligan 0-1, Peter Canavan 0-1.	Report	P Bradley 0-5, G Diamond 0-3, A Tohill 0-3, E. Muldoon 0-2, P Murphy 0-1.	Referee: P Russell (Tipperary)

24 June 2001 Semi-final	Monaghan	0-11 - 0-13	Cavan	St Tiernach's Park, Clones
	T Freeman 0-4, G Meehan 0-2, D Smyth 0-2, D Farmer 0-1, P Duffy 0-1, C Tavey 0-1.	Report	F O’Reilly 0-5, D McCabe 0-3, A Forde 0-1, P Reilly 0-1, P Galligan 0-1, E Jackson 0-1, L Reilly 0-1.	Referee: M Collins (Cork)

== Final ==
8 July 2001 Final	Tyrone	1-13 - 1-11	Cavan	St Tiernach's Park, Clones
	S O’Neill 0-4, C McAnallen 1-0, Peter Canavan 0-3, G Cavlan 0-2, D McCrossan 0-1, K Hughes 0-1, B Dooher 0-1, E Gormley 0-1.	Report	J Reilly 1-1, F O’Reilly 0-3, P Reilly 0-3, P Galligan 0-2, A Forde 0-1, D McCabe 0-1.	Referee: M Collins (Cork)

== Miscellaneous ==
- This was the first year in which the All-Ireland Qualifier system was used, guaranteeing teams a second chance at progress in the All-Ireland Series.

== See also ==
- 2001 All-Ireland Senior Football Championship
