= Dessie Sloyan =

Sligo Gaelic footballer (born 1976)

Personal information
- Native name: Deasún Ó Sluáin (Irish)
- Born: 2 February 1976 (age 50) Easkey, County Sligo, Ireland
- Height: 5 ft 11 in (180 cm)

Sport
- Sport: Gaelic football
- Position: Full-forward
Club
- Years: Club
- Easkey
Club titles
- Sligo titles: 0
Inter-county
- Years: County
- 1996–2006: Sligo
Inter-county titles
- Leinster titles: 0
- All-Irelands: 0
- NFL: 0
- All Stars: 0

Desmond "Dessie" Sloyan (born 2 February 1976) is an Irish Gaelic football manager and former player. His league and championship career at senior level with the Sligo county team spanned ten seasons from 1996 until 2006.

== Playing career ==
Sloyan scored eight points in Sligo's unexpected victory over a Mick O'Dwyer-managed Kildare in the 2001 All-Ireland Senior Football Championship.

== Managerial career ==
He has also had a successful managerial career in Gaelic Football, winning a Connacht Junior Club Football Championship in 2018 with his club Easkey and also managing Sligo GAA U20s to their first ever provincial title at that age group when winning the 2022 Connacht Under-20 Football Championship.

He joined the Longford senior football team backroom team when Paddy Christie was appointed manager in August 2022.

As of January 2025, he was working with manager Ray Dempsey and head coach and selector Joe Brolly at Mayo's Knockmore GAA club. In July 2025, he was ratified as joint manager of the Sligo senior footballers with Eamonn O'Hara.

== Career statistics ==
Team	Year	Connacht		All-Ireland		Total	
Team	Year	Apps	Score	Apps	Score	Apps	Score
Sligo	1997	2	1–3	0	0–0	2	1–3
Sligo	1998	3	1–0	0	0–0	3	1–0
Sligo	1999	2	0–2	0	0–0	2	0–2
Sligo	2000	2	0–3	0	0–0	2	0–3
Sligo	2001	1	0–4	3	1–15	4	1–19
Sligo	2002	3	1–6	3	1–17	6	2–23
Sligo	2003	2	0–10	1	0–5	3	0–15
Sligo	2004	2	0–9	1	0–1	3	0–10
Sligo	2005	0	0–0	4	0–5	4	0–5
Sligo	2006	0	0–0	0	0–0	0	0–0
Total		17	3–37	12	2–43	29	5–80
