= 2000 Ulster Senior Football Championship =

Gaelic football tournament

2000 Ulster SFC
Tournament details
- Province: Ulster
- Year: 2000
- Trophy: Anglo-Celt Cup
- Date: 14 May 2000 - 16 July 2000
- Defending champions: Armagh

Winners
- Champions: Armagh (9th win)
- Manager: Brian McAlinden/Brian Canavan
- Captain: Kieran McGeeney

Runners-up
- Runners-up: Derry
- Manager: Eamon Coleman
- Captain: Anthony Tohill

Other
- Matches played: 9

The 2000 Ulster Senior Football Championship was the 112th installment of the annual Ulster Senior Football Championship organised by Ulster GAA. It was one of the four provincial competitions of the 2000 All-Ireland Senior Football Championship.

Armagh successfully defended their title, beating 1998 winners Derry in the final.

== Teams ==
=== General Information ===
Nine counties competed in the Ulster Senior Football Championship:

County	Last Championship Title	Last All-Ireland Title	Position in 1999 Championship	Sponsor
Antrim	1951	—	Quarter-finals	Bushmills
Armagh	2008	—	Champions	Morgan Fuels
Cavan	1997	1952	Quarter-finals	Kingspan
Derry	1998	1993	Semi-Finals	Sperrin Metal
Donegal	1992	1992	Quarter-finals	Abbey Hotel
Down	1994	1994	Runners Up	Canal Court Hotel
Fermanagh	—	—	Quarter Finals	Tracey Concrete
Monaghan	1988	—	Preliminary Round	Harte Peat
Tyrone	1995	—	Semi-finals	W.J. Dolan

== Championship Draw ==
The draw for the 2000 Championship was made on 14 November 1999.

Preliminary round
Monaghan	1-10
Fermanagh	3-12

Quarter-finals
Donegal	0-13
Fermanagh	1-12
Tyrone	0-08
Armagh	0-12
Cavan	1-05
Derry	2-13
Down	1-07
Antrim	0-13

Semi-finals
Fermanagh	0-12
Armagh	0-13
Derry	1-17
Antrim	2-05

Final
Armagh	1-12
Derry	1-11

== Preliminary round ==
14 May 2000
Preliminary round

Fermanagh	3-12 - 1-10	Monaghan
Raymond Gallagher 1-2, Rory Gallagher 0-5, S Maguire 1-1, R Johnson 1-0, S King 0-2, T Callaghan 0-1, S McDermott 0-1.		K Tavey 1-1, D Smith 0-4, C McCaul 0-2, D Freeman 0-2, D Clerkin 0-1.

Brewster Park, Enniskillen
Attendance: 9,500
Referee: E Murtagh (Longford)

== Quarter-finals ==
14 May 2000
Quarter-final

Cavan	1-5 - 2-13	Derry
L Reilly 0-4, F Cahill 1-0, P Reilly 0-1.		E. Muldoon 1-3, G McGonagle 1-2, A Tohill 0-4, P Bradley 0-3, R Rocks 0-1.

Breffni Park, Cavan
Attendance: 20,000
Referee: B White (Wexford)
28 May 2000
Quarter-final

Antrim	0-13 - 1-7	Down
S McQuillan 0-7, K Doyle 0-3, J Quinn 0-1, P McCann 0-1, C Colman 0-1.		G McCartan 1-1, S Mulholland 0-1, L Doyle 0-1, M Linden 0-1, C McCabe 0-1, S Ward 0-1, J McCrtan 0-1.

Casement Park, Belfast
Attendance: 16,500
Referee: S McCormack (Meath)
4 June 2000
Quarter-final

Tyrone	0-8 - 0-12	Armagh
E Gormley 0-7, C McBride 0-1.		O McConville 0-4, C O'Rourke 0-3, S McDonnell 0-2, D Marsden 0-1, T McEntee 0-1, P McKeever 0-1.

St Tiernach's Park, Clones
Attendance: 30,487
Referee: P Russell (Tipperary)
11 June 2000
Quarter-final

Donegal	0-13 - 1-12	Fermanagh
T Boyle 0-5, A Sweeney 0-3, B McLaughlin 0-1, M Hegarty 0-1, O Reid 0-1, J Gildea 0-1, B Devenney 0-1.		Rory Gallagher 1-6, Ray Gallagher 0-2, S McDermott 0-2, S King 0-1, J Gilheaney 0-1.

MacCumhaill Park, Ballybofey
Attendance: 10,000
Referee: D Joyce (Galway)

== Semi-finals ==
18 June 2000
Semi-final

Antrim	2-8 - 0-14	Derry
K Brady 2-0, S McQuillan 0-3, R Hamill 0-2, K Doyle 0-1, K Madden 0-1, A Morris 0-1.		A Tohill 0-4, D Dougan 0-4, P Bradley 0-2, E. Muldoon 0-2, R Rocks 0-1, G Coleman 0-1.

Casement Park, Belfast
Attendance: 20,000
Referee: J Bannon (Longford)
25 June 2000
Semi-final

Armagh	0-13 - 0-12	Fermanagh
B O'Hagan 0-3, J McEntee 0-2, O McConville 0-2, S McDonnell 0-2, C O'Rourke 0-2, A McCann 0-1, A O'Neill 0-1.		Rory Gallagher 0-8, Ray Gallagher 0-2, R Johnson 0-1, S King 0-1.

St Tiernach's Park, Clones
Attendance: 28,059
Referee: B White (Wexford)
2 July 2000
Semi-final replay

Antrim	2-5 - 1-17	Derry
S McQuillan 1-1, P McCann 1-0, R Hamill 0-1, K Madden 0-1, A Morris 0-1, P Logan 0-1.		P Bradley 1-5, E. Muldoon 0-4, A Tohill 0-3, E Burns 0-2, J Brolly 0-2, R Rocks 0-1.

Casement Park, Belfast
Attendance: 30,000
Referee: P Russell (Tipperary)

== Final ==
16 July 2000
Final

Armagh	1-12 - 1-11	Derry
S McDonnell 1-1, C O'Rourke 0-4, O McConville 0-3, J McNulty 0-1, J McEntee 0-1, P McGrane 0-1, B O'Hagan 0-1.		J McBride 1-3, A Tohill 0-4, E. Muldoon 0-2, D Dougan 0-1, J Cassidy 0-1.

St Tiernach's Park, Clones
Attendance: 33,253
Referee: M Curley (Galway)

== Miscellaneous ==
- This was the final Ulster Championship before the Covid-hit 2020 season where defeat meant elimination from the All-Ireland Championship.
- Antrim's victory over Down in the Quarter-final on 28 May was played during a thunder-storm in Belfast. It was Antrim's first win in the Ulster SFC since their win over Cavan in 1982.

== See also ==
- 2000 All-Ireland Senior Football Championship
- 2000 Ulster Senior Football Championship Final
