= Pádraig Brennan =

Irish Gaelic footballer and selector

Personal information
- Native name: Pádraig Ó Braonáin (Irish)
- Born: 25 December 1978 (age 47) Newbridge, County Kildare, Ireland
- Occupation: Army Officer
- Height: 6 ft 0 in (183 cm)

Sport
- Sport: Gaelic Football
- Position: Left corner-forward
Club
- Years: Club
- Sarsfields
Club titles
- Kildare titles: 4
Inter-county
- Years: County
- 1997–2006: Kildare
Inter-county titles
- Leinster titles: 2
- All-Irelands: 0
- NFL: 0
- All Stars: 0

Pádraig Brennan (born 25 December 1978) is an Irish former Gaelic football selector and retired player. His league and championship career with the Kildare senior team spanned nine seasons from 1997 until 2006.

== Honours ==
Sarsfields

- Kildare Senior Football Championship (4): 1999, 2001, 2005, 2012

Kildare

- Leinster Senior Football Championship (2): 1998, 2000
