= 2000 All-Ireland Senior Football Championship =

Football championship

Championship details
- Dates: 7 May – 7 October 2000
- Teams: 33

All-Ireland Champions
- Winning team: Kerry (32nd win)
- Captain: Séamus Moynihan
- Manager: Páidí Ó Sé

All-Ireland Finalists
- Losing team: Galway
- Captain: Pádraic Joyce
- Manager: John O'Mahony

Provincial Champions
- Munster: Kerry
- Leinster: Kildare
- Ulster: Armagh
- Connacht: Galway

Championship statistics
- No. matches played: 36
- Goals total: 74 (2.06 per game)
- Points total: 898 (24.95 per game)
- Top Scorer: Dara Ó Cinnéide (3–22)
- Player of the Year: Séamus Moynihan

The 2000 Bank of Ireland All-Ireland Senior Football Championship was the 114th edition of the GAA's premier Gaelic football competition. The championship began on 7 May 2000 and ended on 7 October 2000.

Meath entered the championship as the defending champions; however, they were beaten by Offaly in the Leinster quarter-final.

On 24 September 2000, the All-Ireland final between Kerry and Galway ended in a draw, 0–14 apiece. Kerry won the replay two weeks later by 0–17 to 1–10, thus claiming their 32nd All-Ireland title.

This was the final year that the provincial knockout format was used, before the qualifier system was introduced in 2001.

== Format ==
The Ulster, Munster and Connacht championships were conducted as straight knock-out competitions. In the Leinster championship, seven teams received byes to the quarter-finals, while the other four — Wicklow, Wexford, Longford and Carlow — played a round-robin to determine the 8th team to play in the Leinster quarter-finals. The winners of each provincial competition went on to play in the All Ireland semi-finals.

== Provincial championships ==
=== Connacht Senior Football Championship ===
Quarter-finals
Mayo	1–10
Sligo	1–13
New York	1–05
Galway	1–15
London	0–10
Roscommon	4–18

Semi-finals
Sligo	0–04
Galway	0–22
Leitrim	1–13
Roscommon	3–06

Final
Galway	1–13
Leitrim	0–08

Quarter-finals

4 June 2000 Quarter-final	London	0–10 – 4–18	Roscommon	Emerald GAA Grounds, Ruislip
	K Jackman 0–6, D Deering 0–2, C Galligan 0–1, M McConmey 0–1.		F Dolan 2–3, G Lohan 2–1, E Lohan 0–5, F Grehan 0–3, N Dineen 0–3, A Nolan 0–1, D Casserly 0–1, F Graham 0–1.	Referee: P O'Toole (Longford)

10 June 2000 Quarter-final	Galway	1–15 – 1–5	New York	Tuam Stadium, Tuam
	J Fallon 1–2, P Clancy 0–4, N Finnegan 0–3, D Savage 0–2, P Joyce 0–2, S Óg de Paor 0–1, J Bergin 0–1.		M Slowey 1–3, G Dowd 0–1, M Coleman 0–1.	Referee: P McGann (Westmeath)

11 June 2000 Quarter-final	Sligo	1–13 – 1–10	Mayo	Markievicz Park, Sligo
	K Killeen 1–2, P Taylor 0–5, D Sloyan 0–2, S Davey 0–1, J McPartland 0–1, G McGowan 0–1, E O'Hara 0–1.		K McDonald 1–1, T Mortimer 0–3, C McManaman 0–2, P Fallon 0–2, K O'Neill 0–1, A Higgins 0–1.	Attendance: 15,000; Referee: A Mangan (Kerry)

Semi-finals

2 July 2000 Semi-final	Roscommon	3–6 – 1–13	Leitrim	Dr. Hyde Park, Roscommon
	G Lohan 1–1, F Dolan 1–1, J Gilooly 1–0, F O'Donnell 0–2, D Duggan 0–1, F Grehan 0–1.		P Kieran 0–5, A Rooney 0–4, D Reynolds 1–0, G Foley 0–1, S Quinn 0–1, P Kenny 0–1, F McBrien 0–1.	Attendance: 12,000; Referee: N Barrett (Cork)

9 July 2000 Semi-final	Sligo	0–4 – 0–22	Galway	Markievicz Park, Sligo
	E O'Hara 0–1, P Taylor 0–1, K Killeen 0–1, D Sloyan 0–1.		P Joyce 0–5, N Finnegan 0–4, D Savage 0–3, J Bergin 0–3, M Donnellan 0–3, P Clancy 0–2, T Joyce 0–1, J Killeen 0–1.	Attendance: 15,000; Referee: B White (Wexford)

Final

30 July 2000 Final	Galway	1–13 – 0–8	Leitrim	Dr. Hyde Park, Roscommon
	D Savage 1–1, P Clancy 0–3, N Finnegan 0–3, P Joyce 0–2, J Bergin 0–1, D Meehan 0–1, S Walsh 0–1, N Donnellan 0–1.		A Rooney 0–6, S Quinn 0–1, P Farrell 0–1.	Attendance: 28,000; Referee: B Crowe (Cavan)

=== Munster Senior Football Championship ===
Quarter-finals
Clare	0–15
Waterford	1–07
Limerick	2–08
Cork	3–13

Semi-finals
Clare	0–15
Tipperary	0–10
Kerry	2–15
Cork	1–13

Final
Clare	0–08
Kerry	3–15

Quarter-finals

14 May 2000 Quarter-final	Clare	0–15 – 1–7	Waterford	Cusack Park, Ennis
	B McMahon 0–4, M Daly 0–3, P McMahon 0–2, G Keane 0–2, D O'Sullivan 0–2, B Keating 0–1, J Daly 0–1.		E Doherty 1–3, L Dalton 0–1, G Hurney 0–1, R Power 0–1, C Keane 0–1.	Attendance: 5,000; Referee: S Prior (Leitrim)

20 May 2000 Quarter-final	Limerick	2–8 – 3–13	Cork	FitzGerald Park, Kilmallock
	C Hickey 2–3, D Reidy 0–2, P Ahearn 0–2, J Galvin 0–1.		J Kavanagh 1–3, K Daly 1–0, P O'Mahony 1–0, P Clifford 0–3, C O'Sullivan 0–2, D Davis 0–1, A Dorgan 0–1, S O'Brien 0–1, N Murphy 0–1, B Collins 0–1.	Attendance: 7,000; Referee: H Beirne (Roscommon)

Semi-finals

18 June 2000 Semi-final	Kerry	2–15 – 1–13	Cork	FitzGerald Stadium, Killarney
	D Ó Cinnéide 2–5, MF Russell 0–3, L Hassett 0–2, N Kennelly 0–2, D Ó Sé 0–1, A Mac Gearailt 0–1, J Crowley 0–1.		C Corkery 1–8, M Cronin 0–2, A Dorgan 0–2, P Clifford 0–1.	Attendance: 40,115; Referee: M Curley (Galway)

25 June 2000 Semi-final	Tipperary	0–10 – 0–15	Clare	Gaelic Grounds, Limerick
	D Browne 0–8, L England 0–1, P Lambert 0–1.		M Daly 0–5, B McMahon 0–3, G Keane 0–3, P McMahon 0–2, D O'Driscoll 0–2.	Attendance: 8,201; Referee: M Convery (Derry)

Final

16 July 2000 Final	Kerry	3–15 – 0–8	Clare	Gaelic Grounds, Limerick
	A Mac Gearailt 1–3, J Crowley 1–3, L Hassett 1–1, D Ó Cinnéide 0–4, N Kennelly 0–2, MF Russell 0–2.	Report	G Keane 0–4, P McMahon 0–2, D Russell 0–2.	Attendance: 23,176; Referee: J Bannon (Longford)

=== Ulster Senior Football Championship ===
Preliminary round
Monaghan	1–10
Fermanagh	3–12

Quarter-finals
Donegal	0–13
Fermanagh	1–12
Tyrone	0–08
Armagh	0–12
Cavan	1–05
Derry	2–13
Down	1–07
Antrim	0–13

Semi-finals
Fermanagh	0–12
Armagh	0–13
Derry	1–17
Antrim	2–05

Final
Armagh	1–12
Derry	1–11

Preliminary round

14 May 2000 Preliminary round	Fermanagh	3–12 – 1–10	Monaghan	Brewster Park, Enniskillen
	Raymond Gallagher 1–2, Rory Gallagher 0–5, S Maguire 1–1, R Johnson 1–0, S King 0–2, T Callaghan 0–1, S McDermott 0–1.		K Tavey 1–1, D Smith 0–4, C McCaul 0–2, D Freeman 0–2, D Clerkin 0–1.	Attendance: 9,500; Referee: E Mourtagh (Longford)

Quarter-finals

14 May 2000 Quarter-final	Cavan	1–5 – 2–13	Derry	Breffni Park, Cavan
	L Reilly 0–4, F Cahill 1–0, P Reilly 0–1.		E. Muldoon 1–3, G McGonagle 1–2, A Tohill 0–4, P Bradley 0–3, R Rocks 0–1.	Attendance: 20,000; Referee: B White (Wexford)

28 May 2000 Quarter-final	Antrim	0–13 – 1–7	Down	Casement Park, Belfast
	S McQuillan 0–7, K Doyle 0–3, J Quinn 0–1, P McCann 0–1, C Colman 0–1.		G McCartan 1–1, S Mulholland 0–1, L Doyle 0–1, M Linden 0–1, C McCabe 0–1, S Ward 0–1, J McCrtan 0–1.	Attendance: 16,500; Referee: S McCormack (Meath)

4 June 2000 Quarter-final	Tyrone	0–8 – 0–12	Armagh	St Tiernach's Park, Clones
	E Gormley 0–7, C McBride 0–1.		O McConville 0–4, C O'Rourke 0–3, S McDonnell 0–2, D Marsden 0–1, T McEntee 0–1, P McKeever 0–1.	Attendance: 30,487; Referee: P Russell (Tipperary)

11 June 2000 Quarter-final	Donegal	0–13 – 1–12	Fermanagh	MacCumhaill Park, Ballybofey
	T Boyle 0–5, A Sweeney 0–3, B McLaughlin 0–1, M Hegarty 0–1, O Reid 0–1, J Gildea 0–1, B Devenney 0–1.		Rory Gallagher 1–6, Ray Gallagher 0–2, S McDermott 0–2, S King 0–1, J Gilheaney 0–1.	Attendance: 10,000; Referee: D Joyce (Galway)

Semi-finals

18 June 2000 Semi-final	Antrim	2–8 – 0–14	Derry	Casement Park, Belfast
	K Brady 2–0, S McQuillan 0–3, R Hamill 0–2, K Doyle 0–1, K Madden 0–1, A Morris 0–1.		A Tohill 0–4, D Dougan 0–4, P Bradley 0–2, E. Muldoon 0–2, R Rocks 0–1, G Coleman 0–1.	Attendance: 20,000; Referee: J Bannon (Longford)

25 June 2000 Semi-final	Armagh	0–13 – 0–12	Fermanagh	St Tiernach's Park, Clones
	B O'Hagan 0–3, J McEntee 0–2, O McConville 0–2, S McDonnell 0–2, C O'Rourke 0–2, A McCann 0–1, A O'Neill 0–1.		Rory Gallagher 0–8, Ray Gallagher 0–2, R Johnson 0–1, S King 0–1.	Attendance: 28,059; Referee: B White (Wexford)

2 July 2000 Semi-final replay	Antrim	2–5 – 1–17	Derry	Casement Park, Belfast
	S McQuillan 1–1, P McCann 1–0, R Hamill 0–1, K Madden 0–1, A Morris 0–1, P Logan 0–1.		P Bradley 1–5, E. Muldoon 0–4, A Tohill 0–3, E Burns 0–2, J Brolly 0–2, R Rocks 0–1.	Attendance: 30,000; Referee: P Russell (Tipperary)

Final

16 July 2000 Final	Armagh	1–12 – 1–11	Derry	St Tiernach's Park, Clones
	S McDonnell 1–1, C O'Rourke 0–4, O McConville 0–3, J McNulty 0–1, J McEntee 0–1, P McGrane 0–1, B O'Hagan 0–1.		J McBride 1–3, A Tohill 0–4, E. Muldoon 0–2, D Dougan 0–1, J Cassidy 0–1.	Attendance: 33,253; Referee: M Curley (Galway)

=== Leinster Senior Football Championship ===
Group stage

Pos	Team	Pld	W	D	L	Scores for	Scores against	+/-	Points
1	Wexford	3	2	1	0	6–30	0–35	+13	5
2	Longford	3	2	0	1	2–42	6–27	+3	4
3	Wicklow	3	1	1	1	2–31	3–29	−1	3
4	Carlow	3	0	0	3	2–25	3–37	−15	0

7 May 2000 Round 1	Wexford	3–9 – 0–12	Longford	O'Kennedy Park, New Ross
	J Hegarty 2–1, J Lalwor 1–4, L O'Brien 0–3, M Forde 0–1.		P Davis 0–4, T Smullen 0–2, E Barden 0–2, D Blessington 0–2, E Ledwith 0–1, S Carroll 0–1.	Referee: S McCormack (Meath)

7 May 2000 Round 1	Wicklow	1–8 – 0–7	Carlow	Aughrim County Ground, Aughrim
	T Doyle 1–2, T Gill 0–2, R Coffey 0–1, T Harney 0–1, K O'Brien 0–1, T Hannon 0–1.		M Dowling 0–2, S Kvanagh 0–1, J Morrissey 0–1, J Nevin 0–1, R Donnelly 0–1, J Byrne 0–1.	Attendance: 5,000; Referee: B O'Gorman (Armagh)

14 May 2000 Round 2	Longford	2–12 – 1–10	Wicklow	Pearse Park, Longford
	N Sheridan 2–2, P Davis 0–5, T Smullen 0–2, P Shanly 0–1, L Keenan 0–1, S Hagan 0–1.		T Gill 1–6, T Hannon 0–2, O Ó hAnnaidh 0–1, T Doyle 0–1.	Referee: M McGrath (Donegal)

14 May 2000 Round 2	Carlow	0–10 – 2–11	Wexford	Dr. Cullen Park, Carlow
	J Nevin (1f) 0–4, M Dowling (3f) 0–3, J Kavanagh, S Kavanagh, P Kiernan 0-1each		L O'Brien (7f) 0–8, J Lawlor 1–2, J Berry 1–0, R Dunphy 0–1	Referee: M Monaghan (Kildare)

20 May 2000 Round 3	Wicklow	0–13 – 1–10	Wexford	Aughrim County Ground, Aughrim
	T Gill 0–7, K O'Brien 0–4, R Coffey 0–1, D Jackman 0–1.		L O'Brien 0–6, J Hegarty 1–0, J Lawlor 0–2, S Doran 0–2.	Referee: M McBrien (Fermanagh)

20 May 2000 Round 3	Carlow	2–8 – 0–18	Longford	Dr. Cullen Park, Carlow
	J Kavanagh 1–1, B Kelly 1–0, J Nevin 0–3, C McDonald 0–1, D Donohoe 0–1, P Kiernan 0–1, M Dowling 0–1.		P Davis 0–9, T Smullen 0–4, S Hagan 0–2, N Sheridan 0–1, C Confrey 0–1, P Ross 0–1.	Referee: M McBrien (Fermanagh)

Quarter-finals		Semi-finals		Final
Westmeath	1–12
Laois	0–11	Westmeath	0–11
Dublin	2–20	Dublin	1–14
Wexford	1–08			Dublin	0–12
Offaly	0–13			Kildare	2–11
Meath	0–09	Offaly	2–08
Kildare	1–12	Kildare	0–17
Louth	0–12

Quarter-finals

4 June 2000 Quarter-final	Offaly	0–13 – 0–9	Meath	Croke Park, Dublin
	C Quinn 0–7, V Claffey 0–4, F Cullen 0–2.		T Giles 0–5, D Curtis 0–3, R Fitzsimons 0–1.	Attendance: 21,359; Referee: M Collins (Cork)

5 June 2000 Quarter-final	Westmeath	1–12 – 0–11	Laois	O'Connor Park, Tullamore
	D Dolan 0–6, M Flanagan 1–2, J Fallon 0–1, D Gavin 0–1, D Heavin 0–1, P Conway 0–1.		P Dunne 0–3, D Delaney 0–3, S Kelly 0–2, K Fitzpatrick 0–1, C Parkinson 0–1, M Lawler 0–1.	Attendance: 14,000; Referee: M McGrath (Donegal)

11 June 2000 Quarter-final	Dublin	2–20 – 1–8	Wexford	Croke Park, Dublin
	V Murphy 1–3, J Gavin 0–6, P Curran 1–1, J Sherlock 0–3, D Darcy 0–2, B Stynes 0–1, C Whelan 0–1, J McGee 0–1, C Moran 0–1, D Homan 0–1.		L O'Brien 0–4, J Lawlor 1–0, J Hegarty 0–2, S Doran 0–1, T Howlin 0–1.	Attendance: 41,171; Referee: P McEneaney (Monaghan)

11 June 2000 Quarter-final	Kildare	1–12 – 0–12	Louth	Croke Park, Dublin
	P Graven 1–4, D Earley 0–2, E McCormack 0–1, K O'Dwyer 0–1, A Rainbow 0–1, K Doyle 0–1, M Lynch 0–1, W McCReery 0–1.		M Stanfield 0–6, D Reilly 0–2, N Malone 0–2, JP Rooney 0–1, D Kirwan 0–1.	Attendance: 41,000; Referee: B Crowe (Cavan)

Semi-finals

25 June 2000 Semi-final	Kildare	0–11 – 1–8	Offaly	Croke Park, Dublin
	J Doyle 0–3, P Gravin 0–3, E McCormack 0–2, W McCreery 0–1, T Fennin 0–1, D Hynan 0–1.		D Ryan 1–0, C Quinn 0–3, V Claffey 0–3, M Keenaghan 0–2.	Attendance: 34,203; Referee: P McEneaney (Monaghan)

2 July 2000 Semi-final	Dublin	1–14 – 0–11	Westmeath	Croke Park, Dublin
	J Sherlock 1–2, J Gavin 0–3, S Connell 0–2, B Stynes 0–2, I Robertson 0–1, D Farrell 0–1, C Moran 0–1, P Curran 0–1, D Homan 0–1.		J Fallon 0–5, D Dolan 0–2, G Heavin 0–1, M Flanagan 0–1, D Heavin 0–1, K Lyons 0–1.	Attendance: 30,792; Referee: S Prior (Leitrim)

16 July 2000 Semi-final replay	Kildare	0–17 – 2–8	Offaly	Croke Park, Dublin
	P Brennan 0–8, E McCormack 0–4, T Fennin 0–2, J Doyle 0–1, D Earley 0–1, M Lynch 0–1.		C Quinn 1–3, C McManus 1–2, V Claffey 0–2, S Grennan 0–1.	Attendance: 37,104; Referee: B Gorman (Armagh)

Final

30 July 2000 Final	Dublin	0–14 – 0–14	Kildare	Croke Park, Dublin
	B Stynes, J Sherlock, C Moran 0–3 each, J Gavin (f), C Whelan, D Farrell, J Magee, V Murphy 0–1 each		P Brennan 0–5 (4f), T Fennin, J Doyle 0–3 (2f) 0–3 each, A Rainbow, R Sweeney, M Lynch 0–1 each	Attendance: 50,066; Referee: P Russell (Tipperary)

12 August 2000 Final replay	Kildare	2–11 – 0–12	Dublin	Croke Park, Dublin
	P Brennan 0–5, D Earley, T Fennin 1–0 each, W McCreery, J Doyle 0–2 each, M Lynch, B Murphy 0–1 each		C Moran 0–3, C Whelan, D Farrell, V Murphy 0–2 each, J Gavin, B Stynes, J Sherlock 0–1 each	Attendance: 51,156; Referee: P McEneaney (Monaghan)

== All-Ireland Senior Football Championship ==
=== Bracket ===
Semi-finals
1M	Kerry	2–11, 2–15 (aet)
1U	Armagh	2–11, 1–15
1C	Galway	0–15
1L	Kildare	2–06

Final
1M	Kerry	0–14 0–17
1C	Galway	0–14, 1–10

=== Semi-finals ===
20 August 2000 Semi-final	Kerry	2–11 – 2–11	Armagh	Croke Park, Dublin
	D Ó Cinnéide 1–2, M Fitzgerald 1–1, MF Russell 0–3, D Ó Sé 0–1, D Daly 0–1, A Mac Gearailt 0–1, N Kennelly 0–1, J Crowley 0–1.		D O'Hagan 1–1, A McCann 1–0, C O'Rourke 0–3, O McConville 0–3, P McKeever 0–1, P McGrane 0–1, T McEntee 0–1, K McGeeney 0–1.	Attendance: 50,449; Referee: J Bannon (Longford)

27 August 2000 Semi-final	Galway	0–15 – 2–6	Kildare	Croke Park, Dublin
	P Joyce 0–7, N Finnegan 0–3, M Donnellan 0–2, P Clancy 0–1, D Savage 0–1, T Joyce 0–1.		B Murphy 1–0, F Fennin 1–0, K O'Dwyer 0–3, P Brennan 0–3.	Attendance: 53,483; Referee: P Russell (Tipperary)

2 September 2000 Semi-final replay	Kerry	2–15 – 1–15 (aet)	Armagh	Croke Park, Dublin
	MF Russell 2–3, D Ó Cinnéide 0–3, M Fitzgerald 0–2, D Ó Sé 0–1, D Daly 0–1, L Hassett 0–1, A Mac Gearailt 0–1, N Kennelly 0–1, J Crowley 0–1, E Fitzmaurice 0–1.		O McConville 1–9, S McDonnell 0–2, J McEntee 0–1, C O'Rourke 0–1, D Marsden 0–1, B O'Hagan 0–1.	Attendance: 50,051; Referee: B White (Wexford)

Finals

24 September 2000 Final	Kerry	0–14 – 0–14	Galway	Croke Park, Dublin
	D Ó Cinnéide 0–4, MF Russell 0–3, L Hassett 0–2, N Kennelly 0–2, J Crowley 0–2, D Ó Sé 0–1.		P Joyce 0–6, N Finnegan 0–3, D Savage 0–2, K Walsh 0–1, J Donnellan 0–1, T Joyce 0–1.	Attendance: 63,349; Referee: P McEneaney (Monaghan)

7 October 2000 Final replay	Kerry	0–17 – 1–10	Galway	Croke Park, Dublin
	D Ó Cinnéide 0–4, L Hassett, J Crowley, A Mac Gearailt 0–3 each, M F Russell 0–2, E Fitzmaurice, M FitzGerald 0–1 each.		D Meehan 1–0, N Finnegan, M Donnellan 0–2 each, S Walsh, K Walsh, S Og de Paor, P Joyce, T Joyce, J Bergin 0–1 each.	Attendance: 64,094; Referee: B White (Wexford)

== Championship statistics ==
=== Top scorers ===
Overall

Rank	Player	County	Tally	Total	Matches	Average
1	Dara Ó Cinnéide	Kerry	3–22	31	6	5.16
2	Oisín McConville	Armagh	1–21	24	5	4.80
3	Pádraic Joyce	Galway	0–23	23	6	3.83
4	Mike Frank Russell	Kerry	2–16	22	6	3.66
4	Rory Gallagher	Fermanagh	1–19	22	3	7.33
6	Pádraig Brennan	Kildare	0–21	21	6	3.50
6	Leigh O'Brien	Wexford	0–21	21	4	4.25
8	Tommy Gill	Wicklow	1–15	18	3	6.00
8	Pádraig Davis	Longford	0–18	18	3	6.00
10	Colm Quinn	Offaly	1–13	16	3	5.33

Single game

Rank	Player	County	Tally	Total	Opposition
1	Oisín McConville	Armagh	1–9	12	Kerry
2	Dara Ó Cinnéide	Kerry	2–5	11	Cork
2	Colin Corkery	Cork	1–8	11	Kerry
4	Frankie Dolan	Roscommon	2–3	9	London
4	Colm Hickey	Limerick	2–3	9	Cork
4	Mike Frank Russell	Kerry	2–3	9	Armagh
4	Rory Gallagher	Fermanagh	1–6	9	Donegal
4	Tommy Gill	Wicklow	1–6	9	Longford
4	Pádraig Davis	Longford	0–9	9	Wicklow
10	Niall Sheridan	Longford	2–2	8	Wicklow
10	Paddy Bradley	Derry	1–5	8	Antrim
10	Declan Browne	Tipperary	0–8	8	Clare
10	Rory Gallagher	Fermanagh	0–8	8	Armagh
10	Leigh O'Brien	Wexford	0–8	8	Carlow
10	Pádraig Brennan	Kildare	0–8	8	Offaly

=== Miscellaneous ===
- On 14 May 2000, Brewster Park, Enniskillen played host to its first championship game for 55 years between Fermanagh vs Monaghan.
- Antrim's Ulster quarter-final defeat of Down is their first championship victory in 18 years.
- Sligo record their first win over Mayo since 1975.
- The Leinster final ends in a draw and goes to a replay for the first time since 1950.
- The All-Ireland semi-final between Kerry and Armagh ends in a draw and goes to a replay for the first time since 1987 game between Cork & Galway.
- The All-Ireland final ends in a draw and goes to a replay for the first time since 1996.
