= Gordon Morley =

Irish Gaelic footballer

Gordon Morley (born 1976) is an Irish former Gaelic footballer who played for Salthill–Knocknacarra and the Mayo county team.

Morley is the son of Frances and John (another Mayo inter-county Gaelic footballer), who was murdered in 1980, when Gordon was four. The youngest in a family of three, he has a brother and a sister.

Morley made his senior inter-county debut for Mayo against Roscommon in the 1999 Connacht Senior Football Championship (SFC). He was the left-corner-back in that game and was named "man of the "match" afterwards. Mayo won the Connacht SFC title that year. Morley marked Don Davis in the 1999 All-Ireland Senior Football Championship semi-final against Cork.

With Salthill–Knocknacarra, Morley won an All-Ireland Senior Club Football Championship title in 2006, after defeating Kilmacud Crokes in the All-Ireland Club SFC semi-final, and having earlier defeated the 2004 title winner Caltra in the Galway Senior Football Championship semi-final and the 2001 title winner Crossmolina Deel Rovers in the Connacht Senior Club Football Championship semi-final. Ahead of the final against St Gall's, Morley was reported in national media as one of only two Salthill–Knocknacarra players to have any prior recognition (the other player was Finian Hanley). He was centre-back on the winning team.
