= 2005–06 All-Ireland Senior Club Football Championship =

Irish Football Championship

- Dates: 16 October 2005 – 17 March 2006
- Teams: 33
- Sponsor: Allied Irish Bank
- Champions: Salthill–Knocknacarra (1st title); Maurice Sheridan (captain); Eoin O'Donnellan (manager)
- Runners-up: St Gall's; Seán Kelly (captain); John Rafferty (manager)

Tournament statistics
- Matches played: 35
- Top scorer(s): James Masters (2–17)

The 2005–06 All-Ireland Senior Club Football Championship was the 36th staging of the All-Ireland Senior Club Football Championship since its establishment by the Gaelic Athletic Association in 1970–71. The competition began on 16 October 2005 and concluded on 17 March 2006.

The defending champion was Ballina Stephenites; however, the club did not qualify after losing to Charlestown Sarsfields in the 2005 Mayo SFC quarter-final replay.

Salthill–Knocknacarra defeated St Gall's by 0–7 to 0–6 in the final at Croke Park on 17 March 2006 to win the competition. It was the club's first title.

James Masters from the Nemo Rangers club was the competition's top scorer, finishing with 2–17.

== Connacht ==
=== Quarter-final ===
| 16 October 2005 Quarter-final | Coolera–Strandhill | 0-04 - 0-09 | Kiltubrid | Markievicz Park |
| | J McPartland 0-2, S Quinn 0-1, A McPartland 0-1. | | J Gill 0-3, C Doherty 0-2, E Lee 0-1, S Foley 0-1, N O'Donoghue 0-1, J Foley 0-1. |

=== Semi-finals ===
| 6 November 2005 Semi-final | Salthill–Knocknacarra | 0-09 - 0-07 | Crossmolina Deel Rovers | Pearse Stadium |
| | S Crowe 0-4, S Armstrong 0-2, S Rabbitte 0-1, B Dooney 0-1, M Donnellan 0-1. | | C McDonald 0-4, M Moyles 0-1, J Keane 0-1, B Benson 0-1. |

| 6 November 2005 Semi-final | Kiltubrid | 0-09 - 0-09 | St Brigid's | Páirc Seán Mac Diarmada |
| | D McKiernan 0-3, C Doherty 0-3, J Gill 0-1, M Earley 0-1, A Bohan 0-1. | | F Dolan 0-4, K Mannion 0-2, R Kelly 0-1, B O'Brien 0-1, G Aherne 0-1. |

| 12 November 2005 Semi-final replay | St Brigid's | 1-11 - 1-07 | Kiltubrid | Kiltoom |
| | F Dolan 0-7, K Mannion 1-2, I Kilbride 0-2. | | N O'Donoghue 1-2, D McKiernan 0-2, C Doherty 0-1, M Earley 0-1, C Carroll 0-1. |

=== Final ===
| 20 November 2005 Final | Salthill–Knocknacarra | 1-10 - 0-05 | St Brigid's | Pearse Stadium |
| | M Sheridan 1-2 (1-0 pen, 0-2f), S Crowe 0-4 (2f), A Kerins 0-2, S Armstrong, M Donnellan 0-1 each. | Report | K Mannion 0-2, I Kilbride, S Kilbride, F Dolan (f) 0-1 each. |

== Leinster ==
=== First round ===
| 6 November 2005 First round | The Downs | 0-10 - 1-08 | Mattock Rangers | Cusack Park |
| | T Cleary 0-3, L Folan 0-3, J Conroy 0-2, B Conroy 0-2. | | M Brennan 1-1, C Grimes 0-4, D Reid 0-3. |

| 6 November 2005 First round | Muckalee | 1-05 - 0-16 | St Peter's | St Patrick's Park |
| | J Moran 1-0; E McGrath 0-3; R Ruane 0-2. | Report | G Robinson, S Moran 0-5 each; S McGarrell, D Gallagher 0-2 each; C Brennan, A McEntee 0-1 each. |

| 6 November 2005 First round | Éire Óg | 0-12 - 0-04 | Dromard | Dr Cullen Park |
| | S Rea 0-9, A O'Brien 0-1, J Morrissey 0-1, D Walker 0-1. | | F McGee 0-2, N Reynolds 0-1, J Martin 0-1. |

| 6 November 2005 First round | Rathnew | 1-03 - 2-06 | Rhode | Aughrim County Ground |
| | A Mernagh 1-0, J Stafford 0-1, M Coffey 0-1, T Gill 0-1. | Report | M Cole 1-1, N McNamee 0-4, P Kelleghan 1-0, B Darby 0-1. |

=== Quarter-finals ===
| 13 November 2004 Quarter-final | Mattock Rangers | 1-09 - 1-08 | Horeswood | Drogheda Park |
| | C Grimes 1-2, D Reid 0-2, N Callan 0-2, I Sherlock 0-1, R Brennan 0-1, S Grimes 0-1. | | D Shannon 0-4, B Hearn 1-0, L O'Brien 0-2, N Collins 0-1, C Deely 0-1. |

| 13 November 2004 Quarter-final | Éire Óg | 0-08 - 1-12 | Sarsfields | Dr Cullen Park |
| | B Carberry 0-3; J Morrissey, S Rea (1f) 0-2 each; C Bolger 0-1. | Report | G White 1-3 (3fs); M O'Sullivan, C Dempsey (2fs) 0-3 each; A Barry, A Smith, E Freaney 0-1 each. |

| 13 November 2004 Quarter-final | Rhode | 1-06 - 0-06 | Stradbally | O'Connor Park |
| | N McNamee 1-3 (1f), P Kellaghan, J Kilmurray, D Hope (f) 0-1 each. | Report | C Kelly 0-5 (3f, 1 sideline ball), G Kavanagh 0-1. |

| 13 November 2005 Quarter-final | St Peter's | 0-03 - 1-14 | Kilmacud Crokes | Páirc Tailteann |
| | G Robinson 0-2, N Crawford 0-1. | | R Cosgrove 1-10, L McBarron 0-2, N Corkery 0-1, K O'Carroll 0-1. |

=== Semi-finals ===
| 20 November 2005 Semi-final | Sasrsfields | 0-15 - 0-10 | Mattock Rangers | Páirc Tailteann |
| | M O'Sullivan 0-5, G White 0-4, E Freaney 0-2, Dermot Earley 0-2, A Smith 0-1, P Campbell 0-1. | | C Grimes 0-3, A Reid 0-2, M Brennan 0-2, N Callan 0-2, D Reid 0-1. |

| 20 November 2005 Semi-final | Kilmacud Crokes | 1-09 - 2-06 | Rhode | O'Moore Park |
| | M Vaughan 1-5, R Cosgrove 0-2, D Magee 0-1, L McBarron 0-1. | | N McNamee 1-1, P Sullivan 1-0, R Malone 0-2, D Kellaghan 0-1, M Cole 0-1, P Kellaghan 0-1. |

| 27 November 2005 Semi-final replay | Kilmacud Crokes | 2-06 - 1-07 | Rhode | St Conleth's Park |
| | M Davoren 1-2, R Cosgrove 1-1, M Vaughan 0-2, J Magee 0-1. | | N McNamee 0-5, P Sullivan 1-0, A McNamee 0-2. |

=== Final ===
| 4 December 2005 Final | Kilmacud Crokes | 0-10 - 0-09 | Sarsfields | Páirc Tailteann |
| | M Vaughan 0-2, M Davoren 0-2, R Cosgrove 0-2, J Magee 0-2, L McBarron 0-1, P Burke 0-1. | | P Brennan 0-4, G White 0-2, A Smyth 0-1, M Dunne 0-1, M O'Sullivan 0-1. |

== Munster ==
=== Quarter-finals ===
| 13 November 2005 Quarter-final | Ardfinnan | 0-06 - 1-13 | Nemo Rangers | Ardfinnan |
| | L Bannon 0-2, P Lambert 0-1, P Hally 0-1, A Keating 0-1, B Cummins 0-1. | Report | S O-Brien 0-4; D Niblock 1-0, J Masters 0-3 (0-1 free), M Daly 0-1, A Morgan 0-1, B O-Regan 0-1, M Kearney 0-1, D Kearney 0-1, J Kavanagh 0-1. |

| 13 November 2005 Quarter-final | Monaleen | 1-07 - 0-10 | St Senan's | Gaelic Grounds |
| | M Gavin 0-5, J O'Brien 1-1, M Crowley (0-1. | | Denis Russell 0-4, M O'Shea 0-3, David Russell 0-2, J Larkin 0-1. |

| 19 November 2005 Quarter-final replay | St Senan's | 1-11 - 0-06 | Monaleen | Cooraclare |
| | De Loughrey 1-0, G Keane 0-2, Denis Russell 0-2, M O'shea 0-2 (0-1 free), G Lynch 0-2, N O'shea 0-1, J Larkin 0-1, B Harte 0-1. | | M Gavin 0-4, J Cormican 0-1, E Keating 0-1. |

=== Semi-finals ===
| 27 November 2005 Semi-final | St Senan's | 1-14 - 2-07 | An Ghaeltacht | Cooraclare |
| | M O'Shea 0-4; David Russell 1-0; Denis Russell 0-3 (1f); G Keane, B Harte, C Kirwan 0-2 each; D De Loughery 0-1. | Report | C O Dubhda 1-0; G Crotty (OG) 1-0; D O Cinneide 0-3 (2f, 1 '45); B Breathnach, M MacGearailt, A MacGearailt, T O Muircheartaigh 0-1 each. |

| 27 November 2005 Semi-final | Nemo Rangers | 1-14 - 0-10 | Stradbally | Páirc Uí Chaoimh |
| | P Kerrigan 1-5, J Masters 0-4, D Niblock 0-2, C O'Shea 0-1, S O'Brien 0-1, M Kearney 0-1. | | N Curran 0-9, J Hearne 0-1. |

=== Final ===
| 11 December 2005 Final | Nemo Rangers | 2-12 - 1-06 | St Senan's | Gaelic Grounds |
| | J Masters 1-5, P Kerrigan 1-1, D Niblock 0-3, M Cronin 0-2, A Morgan 0-1. | Report | G Lynch 1-0, M O'Shea 0-3, B Harte 0-2, Denis Russell 0-1. |

== Ulster ==
=== Preliminary round ===
| 29 October 2005 Preliminary round | Carrickmore | 2-10 - 0-05 | Teemore Shamrocks | Healy Park |
| | C Gormley 2-1, M Donnelly 0-3, F Magill 0-2, G McCallan 0-1, R McGarrity 0-1, P Hughes 0-1, R McNally 0-1. | | C O'Reilly 0-4, D Fitzpatrick 0-1. |

=== Quarter-finals ===
| 6 November 2005 Quarter-final | Crossmaglen Rangers | 0-09 - 0-11 | Bellaghy | Oliver Plunkett Park |
| | O McConville 0-6, A Kernan 0-2, J McEntee 0-1. | | J Cassidy 0-4, G Diamond 0-2, J Diver 0-2, F Glackin 0-1, L McPeake 0-1, D Graffin 0-1. |

| 6 November 2005 Quarter-final | St Gall's | 1-11 - 0-08 | Carrickmore | Casement Park |
| | K Stewart 1-3, S Burns 0-3, T O'Neill 0-2, Kevin McGourty 0-2, A McLean 0-1. | | P Loughran 0-2, C Gormley 0-2, F Magill 0-1, P Cunningham 0-1, M Gallagher 0-1, G McCallan 0-1. |

| 6 November 2005 Quarter-final | Mayobridge | 0-10 - 1-05 | Naomh Conaill | Páirc Esler |
| | D Rooney, N Sexton, J Quinn 0-2 each, M Linden, S O'Hare, R Sexton, E Woods, 0-1 each. | Report | L Thompson 1-0, A Thompson 0-3, J McLoone, D Gallagher, L Thompson 0-1 each. |

| 13 November 2005 Quarter-final | Cavan Gaels | 0-12 - 1-07 | Latton O'Rahilly's | Brewster Park |
| | S Johnston 0-6, C Nelligan 0-4, A Forde 0-1. | | N Coyle 1-2, F Fitzpatrick 0-2, A Farmer 0-1, E Duffy 0-1, K Hughes 0-1. |

=== Semi-finals ===
| 20 November 2005 Semi-final | Mayobridge | 0-08 - 0-11 | St Gall's | Páirc Esler |
| | R Coulter 0-3, M Walsh 0-2, B Coulter 0-1, A Barry 0-1, D Rooney 0-1. | | K Stewart 0-5, S Burns 0-3, A Gallagher 0-1, C Crossan 0-1, Kevin McGourty 0-1. |

| 20 November 2005 Semi-final | Bellaghy | 0-11 - 0-09 | Cavan Gaels | Healy Park |
| | J Cassidy 0-5, D Graffin 0-3, L McPeake 0-1, P Diamond 0-1, F Glackin 0-1. | | S Johnston 0-3, C Nelligan 0-2, A Forde 0-1, A O'Riordan 0-1, P Smith 0-1, E Reilly 0-1. |

=== Final ===
| 27 November 2005 Final | St Gall's | 1-08 - 0-08 | Bellaghy | Healy Park |
| | S Burns 0-4 (3f); K Stewart 0-3 (2f); C McCrossan 1-0; C Gallagher 0-1. | Report | J Cassidy 0-7 (6f); C McNally 0-1. |

== Quarter-final ==
| 4 December 2005 Quarter-final | Tír Chonaill Gaels | 0-05 - 0-09 | Salthill–Knocknacarra | Emerald GAA Grounds |
| | JP Boyle 0-2, D Meehan 0-1, P McConigley 0-1, F Cleary 0-1. | | S Crowe 0-3, S Armstrong 0-2, A Kerins 0-2, A McDermott 0-1, J Boylan 0-1. |

== Semi-finals ==
| 19 February 2006 Semi-final | St Gall's | 0-10 - 1-06 | Nemo Rangers | O'Moore Park |
| | S Burns 0-7 (4fs, 2 45s), A Gallagher, K Stewart, C McGourty 0-1 each. | Report | J Masters 1-5 (1-0 pen, 3fs), N O'Sullivan 0-1. |

| 19 February 2006 Semi-final | Salthill–Knocknacarra | 0-09 - 0-07 | Kilmacud Crokes | Pearse Park |
| | S Armstrong 0-4; J Boylan 1-0; M Sheridan 0-3 (2 '45', 1f); M Donnellan 0-2. | Report | M Vaughan 0-4f; C Murphy 1-0; D Magee, J Magee ('45), P Burke 0-1 each. |

== Final ==
| 17 March 2006 Final | Salthill–Knocknacarra | 0-07 - 0-06 | St Gall's | Croke Park |
| | S Rabbitte 0-2, M Sheridan 0-2f, B Dooney, S Armstrong, S Crowe 0-1 each. | Report | C McGourty 0-2f, S Burns 0-2 (0-1f), K Stewart, Kevin McGourty (f) 0-1 each. | Referee: David Coldrick (Meath) |

== Finalists ==
Salthill–Knocknacarra – 2006 All-Ireland Senior Club Football Champions (1st title)

Eoin O'Donnellan managed the winning team.

1. Cathal McGinley
2. Ruaidhrí McTiernan
3. Finian Hanley
4. Cian Begley
5. Martin O'Connell
6. Gordon Morley
7. Brían Geraghty
8. Maurice Sheridan (c)
9. Barry Dooney
10. Alan Kerins
11. Michael Donnellan
12. Séamus Rabbitte
13. Séamus Crowe
14. John Boylan
15. Seán Armstrong

Subs used

24 Aonghus Callanan for Boylan
18 Declan Burke for Kerins
20 PJ Kelly for Callanan
22 Fergal McCann for Crowe
17 Anthony McDermott for Geraghty

Subs not used

16 Brian Fitzpatrick
19 David Gilmartin
21 Greg Begley
23 Tomás Burke

== Statistics ==
=== Top scorers ===
Overall

| Rank | Player | Club | Tally | Total | Matches | Average |
|---|---|---|---|---|---|---|
| 1 | James Masters | Nemo Rangers | 2-17 | 23 | 4 | 5.75 |
| 2 | Ray Cosgrove | Kilmacud Crokes | 2-15 | 21 | 5 | 4.25 |
| 3 | Niall McNamee | Rhode | 2-13 | 19 | 4 | 4.75 |
| 3 | Seán Burns | St Gall's | 0-19 | 19 | 5 | 3.80 |
| 4 | Karl Stewart | St Gall's | 1-13 | 16 | 5 | 3.20 |
| 4 | Mark Vaughan | Kilmacud Crokes | 1-13 | 16 | 5 | 3.20 |
| 4 | Joe Cassidy | Bellaghy | 0-16 | 16 | 3 | 5.33 |
| 5 | Paul Kerrigan | Nemo Rangers | 2-06 | 12 | 3 | 4.00 |
| 5 | Gary White | Sarsfields | 1-09 | 12 | 3 | 4.00 |
| 5 | Christy Grimes | Mattock Rangers | 1-09 | 12 | 3 | 4.00 |
| 5 | Frankie Dolan | St Brigid's | 0-12 | 12 | 3 | 4.00 |
| 5 | Séamie Crowe | Salthill–Knocknacarra | 0-12 | 12 | 5 | 2.60 |

In a single game

| Rank | Player | Club | Tally | Total | Opposition |
|---|---|---|---|---|---|
| 1 | Ray Cosgrove | Kilmacud Crokes | 1-10 | 13 | St Peter's |
| 2 | Simon Rea | Éire Óg | 0-09 | 9 | Dromard |
| 2 | Niall Curran | Stradbally | 0-09 | 9 | Nemo Rangers |
| 3 | Mark Vaughan | Kilmacud Crokes | 1-05 | 8 | Rhode |
| 3 | Paul Kerrigan | Nemo Rangers | 1-05 | 8 | Stradbally |
| 3 | James Masters | Nemo Rangers | 1-05 | 8 | St Senan's |
| 3 | James Masters | Nemo Rangers | 1-05 | 8 | St Gall's |
| 4 | Conor Gormley | Carrickmore | 2-01 | 7 | Teemore Shamrocks |
| 4 | Frankie Dolan | St Brigid's | 0-07 | 7 | Kiltubrid |
| 4 | Joe Cassidy | Bellaghy | 0-07 | 7 | St Gall's |
| 4 | Seán Burns | St Gall's | 0-07 | 7 | Nemo Rangers |
