= Caltra =

Caltra An Chealtrach
- Village
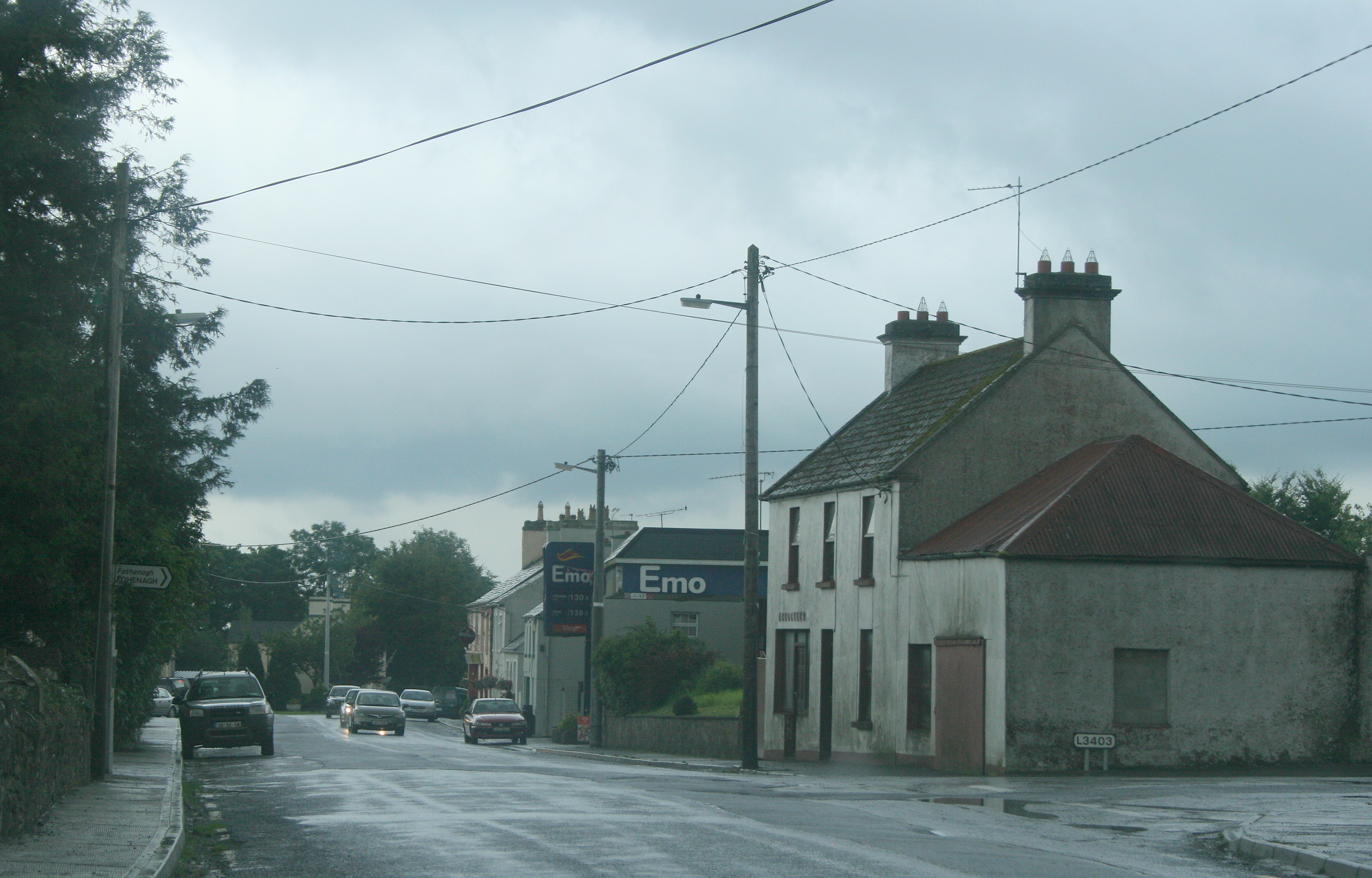
- Caltra, County Galway

- Location in Ireland
- Coordinates: 53°26′00″N 8°26′00″W
- Country: Ireland
- Province: Connacht
- County: County Galway
- Time zone: UTC+0 (WET)
  - Summer (DST): UTC-1 (IST (WEST))
- Irish Grid Reference: M708428

Caltra (Irish: An Chealtrach or Cealtrach na Pailíse meaning "burial-ground of the palisade") is a townland and village on the R358 regional road in County Galway, Ireland. As of the 2011 census, the townland of Caltra had a population of 115 people.

== History ==
Evidence of ancient settlement in the area includes a number of ringfort, fosse and enclosure sites in the townlands of Caltra, Lisnagree and Lislea. The Roman Catholic church in the village is dedicated to Saint Solan. It was built c. 1840 on the site of an earlier friary, and extended in the late 1930s by W.H. Byrne & Sons architects.

== Sport ==
The local Gaelic football club, Caltra GAA, won the All-Ireland Senior Club Football Championship for the 2003–04 season.

== People ==
- Eamon Gilmore, born in Caltra, is a former leader of the Labour Party.
- Michael Meehan, inter-county footballer for Galway.

== See also ==
- List of towns and villages in Ireland
