= Paul Kerrigan =

Irish Gaelic footballer (born 1986)

Personal information
- Native name: Pól Ó Ciaragain (Irish)
- Born: 16 December 1986 (age 39) Cork, Ireland
- Occupation: Secondary school teacher
- Height: 6 ft 0 in (183 cm)

Sport
- Sport: Gaelic football
- Position: Left wing-forward
Club*
Years	Club	Apps (scores)
2004–present	Nemo Rangers	117 (23-247)
Club titles
- Cork titles: 10
- Munster titles: 5
- All-Ireland Titles: 0
College
- Years: College
- 2006-2010: Cork Institute of Technology
College titles
- Sigerson titles: 1
Inter-county**
Years	County	Apps (scores)
2008–2020	Cork	55 (9-76)
Inter-county titles
- Munster titles: 3
- All-Irelands: 1
- NFL: 3
- All Stars: 0
- * club appearances and scores correct as of 21:59, 27 November 2020. **Inter County team apps and scores correct as of 21:59, 27 November 2020.

Paul Kerrigan (born 16 December 1986) is an Irish Gaelic footballer who plays for Cork Premier Championship club Nemo Rangers. A member of the Cork senior football team for 13 seasons from 2008 until 2020, he won seven major trophies in his inter-county career, including the All-Ireland Championship in 2010.

Son of Jimmy Kerrigan, a two-time All-Ireland medal winner with Cork, Kerrigan began his career at club level with Nemo Rangers. He joined the club’s senior team as a 17-year-old in 2004 and has since won five Munster Club Championship titles. Kerrigan has also won 10 Cork County Championship titles from 11 final appearances.

Kerrigan lined out for Cork in three different grades of Gaelic football over a 17-year period. After making his first appearance for the minor team in August 2003, he progressed onto the county under-21 team with whom he won an All-Ireland Under-21 Championship medal in 2007. Kerrigan made his competitive debut for the senior team aged 21 in 2008. His debut season yielded a Munster Championship title. The following four seasons saw Kerrigan win two more Munster Championships, four successive National League titles across two divisions, as well as an All-Ireland Championship title.

== Playing career ==
=== Nemo Rangers ===
Kerrigan joined the Nemo Rangers senior team for the 2004 Cork County Championship but was an unused substitute for the year. He made his championship debut on 17 September 2005 in a 0-17 to 0-06 win over St Michael's in round 4. Kerrigan ended the championship with a winners' medal after coming on as a 25th-minute substitute for Joe Kavanagh in the 1-14 to 1-07 defeat of Muskerry in the final. He later claimed his first Munster Club Championship medal after scoring 1-01 from play in the 2-12 to 1-09 defeat of St. Senan's in the Munster club final.

Kerrigan claimed a second successive county title in 2006 before making it three-in-a-row after a 0-12 to 0-09 win over Ilen Rovers in 2007. A second Munster Club Championship title inside three years was subsequently attained, before Kerrigan lined out in his first All-Ireland club final on 17 March 2008. He ended the game on the losing side after Dublin champions St. Vincent's secured the title with a 1-11 to 0-13 victory.

Kerrigan won a fourth County Championship winners' medal in 2008, as Nemo Rangers became the first team to win four successive championships after a 0-13 to 0-05 defeat of Douglas. Five-in-a-row proved beyond the team, however, Kerrigan claimed a fifth county winners' medal after top scoring with 1-03 in the 2-10 to 1-08 win over St. Finbarr's in the 2010 final. He subsequently claimed his third Munster Club Championship medal after securing a 1-15 to 1-13 win over Dr. Crokes.

After suffering defeat at the hands of Castlehaven in the 2011 final, Kerrigan was Nemo Rangers captain when the sides met in the 2015 final. After an initial drawn game, he collected his sixth county winners' medal after leading Nemo to a 1-10 to 0-11 victory in the replay. Kerrigan also ended the championship as top scorer with 4-22. He again captained the team when Nemo suffered a 1-07 to 0-09 defeat by Clonmel Commercials in the 2015 Munster club final.

Kerrigan won a seventh county championship winners' medal after top scoring with 1-02 in the 4-12 to 3-13 win over St. Finbarr's in the 2017 county final. He later claimed his fourth Munster Club Championship medal after a 0-16 to 0-11 defeat of Dr. Crokes in the 2017 Munster club final. On 17 March 2018, Kerrigan made his first All-Ireland final appearance in ten years when Nemo suffered a 2-10 to 0-10 defeat by Corofin.

Kerrigan claimed an eighth county championship winners' medal after a 2-08 to 0-10 win over Duhallow in the 2019 county final. He later won a fifth Munster Club Championship medal after the 0-15 to 0-06 win over Clonmel Commercials in the 2019 Munster club final.

=== Cork ===
==== Minor and under-21 ====
Kerrigan was just 16-years-old when he was drafted onto the Cork minor football team for the 2003 Munster Minor Championship. He made his first appearance for the team when lining out at left wing-forward in the 2-18 to 0-08 defeat of Tipperary, before later lining out in the same position in the Munster final defeat by Kerry.

In 2004, Cork qualified for a Munster final showdown with arch-rivals Kerry. That game ended in a 0–9 apiece draw. Cork lost the replay by three points. In spite of this Cork were still in with a chance of claiming the All-Ireland title. A 1–9 apiece draw was the result of their All-Ireland quarter-final game against Laois, however, Kerrigan's side were defeated at the second attempt.

In 2005 Kerrigan joined the Cork under-21 football team and was immediately appointed captain for the year. He made his debut in a Munster quarter-final victory over Kerry and, after overcoming Clare, Kerrigan subsequently lined out in the provincial decider against Limerick. A close game developed, however, Cork held on to win by 1–14 to 1–11 and Kerrigan collected his first Munster under-21 winners' medal. Cork were later beaten by Galway in the All-Ireland semi-final.

Kerrigan was a key fixture on the starting fifteen of the Cork under-21 team once again in 2006. He lined out in the provincial decider that year against Waterford, however, the Decies were no match for 'the Rebels'. A 4–14 to 1–6 trouncing gave Cork the victory and gave Kerrigan a second Munster under-21 medal. Cork later manoeuvred through the All-Ireland series and reached the All-Ireland final against Mayo. That game was a close affair, however, at the final whistle Cork were defeated by just two points.

In 2007 Kerrigan was in his last year as a member of the Cork under-21 team. He lined out in the provincial decider that year against Tipperary and a high-scoring and exciting game developed. Cork won by 3–19 to 3–12 and Kerrigan added a third consecutive Munster under-21 winners' medal to his collection. Cork later reached the All-Ireland final against Laois. Colm O'Neill and Daniel Goulding combined to score two goals and to help Cork to a narrow 2–10 to 0–15 victory. It was Kerrigan's first All-Ireland winners' medal at under-21 level.

==== Senior ====
In 2008 Kerrigan made his debut with the Cork senior football team and lined out in his first Munster final. Kerry were cruising by eight points at the interval, however, Cork came back in the second-half. Kerrigan was introduced as a substitute as Cork stymied 'the Kingdom' in the second half and secured a 1–16 to 1–11 victory. It was Kerrigan's first Munster winners' medal. Both sides met again in the All-Ireland semi-final, however, after a draw and a replay Kerry were the team that advanced to the championship decider.

The following year Kerrigan had established himself as a member of the Cork starting fifteen, a team that were earmarked as potential All-Ireland contenders. After a defeat of Kerry in a replay of the Munster semi-final, Cork subsequently faced Limerick in the Munster final. Kerrigan had a poor game and was substituted in the second-half, however, 'the Rebels' eventually secured a narrow 2–6 to 0–11 victory. It was Kerrigan's second Munster title and gave Cork a save passage to an All-Ireland quarter-final meeting with Donegal. Kerrigan improved in that game and finished on the winning side after scoring a grand total of 1–4. He had another good performance in Cork's subsequent defeat of Tyrone. Cork then faced Kerry in the All-Ireland final and were named as favourites. This tag appeared to be justified when Kerrigan's side led by 1–3 to 0–1 early in the opening half. The Kerry team stuck to their gameplan, helped in no small part by a Cork side that recorded fourteen wides. At the final whistle Kerry were the champions again by 0–16 to 1–9.

In 2010 Kerrigan was still seen as a key member of Cork's half-forward line. A defeat by Kerry in a replay of the provincial semi-final resulted in Cork being exiled to the All-Ireland qualifiers. After negotiating their way through a difficult series of games, Cork defeated Dublin to qualify for their third All-Ireland final in four years. Down provided the opposition on that occasion in the first meeting between these two teams since 1994. Cork got off to a lightning start, however, they eased off and trailed by three points at the interval. Kerrigan got his sole point of the match to put 'the Rebels' ahead for the first time in fifty minutes. Cork stretched the lead to three points, however, Down fought back. At the full-time whistle Cork were the champions by 0–16 to 0–15 and Kerrigan picked up an All-Ireland winners' medal.

== Career statistics ==
=== Club ===
As of match played 17 October 2021.

Team	Season	Cork		Munster		All-Ireland		Total	
Team	Season	Apps	Score	Apps	Score	Apps	Score	Apps	Score
Nemo Rangers	2004-05	0	0-00	—		—		0	0-00
Nemo Rangers	2005-06	4	0-03	2	2-06	1	0-00	7	2-09
Nemo Rangers	2006-07	7	0-03	2	0-03	—		9	0-06
Nemo Rangers	2007-08	6	0-21	3	1-10	2	0-04	11	1-35
Nemo Rangers	2008-09	6	1-19	2	2-07	—		8	3-26
Nemo Rangers	2009-10	3	0-08	—		—		3	0-08
Nemo Rangers	2010-11	5	3-16	2	0-10	1	0-00	8	3-26
Nemo Rangers	2011-12	3	0-08	—		—		3	0-08
Nemo Rangers	2012-13	4	0-07	—		—		4	0-07
Nemo Rangers	2013-14	7	1-20	—		—		7	1-20
Nemo Rangers	2014-15	4	0-08	—		—		4	0-08
Nemo Rangers	2015-16	7	4-22	3	0-08	—		10	4-30
Nemo Rangers	2016-17	5	3-06	—		—		5	3-06
Nemo Rangers	2017-18	7	2-14	2	0-07	2	0-04	11	2-25
Nemo Rangers	2018-19	2	1-03	—		—		2	1-03
Nemo Rangers	2019-20	5	2-11	3	0-06	1	0-00	9	2-17
Nemo Rangers	2020-21	6	0-13	—		—		6	0-13
Nemo Rangers	2021-22	3	1-04	—		—		3	1-04
Career total		84	19-186	19	5-57	7	0-08	110	24-251

=== Inter-county ===
Team	Year	National League			Munster		All-Ireland		Total	
Team	Year	Division	Apps	Score	Apps	Score	Apps	Score	Apps	Score
Cork	2008	Division 2	0	0-00	1	0-01	1	0-00	2	0-01
Cork	2009	Division 2	7	1-11	4	1-03	3	1-05	14	3-19
Cork	2010	Division 1	7	4-13	1	0-03	5	0-04	13	4-20
Cork	2011	Division 1	3	0-02	3	1-07	2	1-05	8	2-14
Cork	2012	Division 1	9	0-08	2	0-04	2	0-04	13	0-16
Cork	2013	Division 1	7	0-07	3	0-05	2	0-00	12	0-12
Cork	2014	Division 1	8	2-08	2	0-01	2	0-05	12	2-14
Cork	2015	Division 1	9	0-03	3	1-02	1	0-01	13	1-06
Cork	2016	Division 1	7	0-09	1	0-03	3	2-06	11	2-18
Cork	2017	Division 2	7	1-15	3	1-07	1	0-03	11	2-25
Cork	2018	Division 2	0	0-00	2	0-02	1	0-00	3	0-02
Cork	2019	Division 2	4	0-01	2	0-01	4	1-04	10	1-06
Cork	2020	Division 3	4	2-02	1	0-00	—		5	2-02
Total			72	10-79	28	4-39	27	5-37	127	19-155

== Honours ==
Coláiste Chríost Rí

- Corn Uí Mhuirí (1): 2004

Cork Institute of Technology

- Sigerson Cup (1): 2009

Nemo Rangers

- Munster Senior Club Football Championship (5): 2005, 2007, 2010, 2017, 2019
- Cork Premier Senior Football Championship (10): 2005, 2006, 2007, 2008, 2010, 2015, 2017, 2019 2020, 2022
- Cork Intermediate Football Championship (1): 2004
- Cork Under-21 Football Championship (2): 2004, 2005

Cork

- All-Ireland Senior Football Championship (1): 2010
- Munster Senior Football Championship (3): 2008, 2009, 2012
- National Football League Division 1 (3): 2010, 2011, 2012
- National Football League Division 2 (1): 2009
- National Football League Division 3 (1): 2020
- All-Ireland Under-21 Football Championship (1): 2007
- Munster Under-21 Football Championship (3): 2005, 2006, 2007

Ireland

International Rules Series: (1): 2015

Sporting positions
Preceded by Donal O'Donovan	Cork Under-21 Football Captain; 2005–2006	Succeeded by Andrew O'Sullivan
Preceded by Michael Shields	Cork Senior Football Captain; 2016-2017	Succeeded by Ian Maguire
