= Liam Sammon =

Irish Gaelic footballer and manager (born 1946)

Personal information
- Native name: Liam Ó Bradáin (Irish)
- Born: 15 December 1946 (age 79) Galway, Ireland
- Occupations: P.E. teacher, manager
- Height: 1.87 m (6 ft 2 in)

Sport
- Sport: Gaelic football
- Position: Centre forward
Clubs
- Years: Club
- 1965–1978 1979–1986: Father Griffins; Salthill–Knocknacarra
Club titles
- Galway titles: 4
- Connacht titles: 2
Inter-county
Years	County	Apps (scores)
1966–1979	Galway	34 (6–35)
Inter-county titles
- Connacht titles: 7
- All-Irelands: 1
- NFL: 0
- All Stars: 2

Liam Sammon (born 1946 in Galway) is an Irish former Gaelic football manager, coach, writer and former player. He played football with his local clubs Father Griffins and Salthill–Knocknacarra and was a member of the senior Galway county team from 1966 until 1979.

He won an All-Ireland Senior Football Championship in his first year with the team, 1966. He won All Stars in 1971 and 1973.

Sammon later served as manager of the senior Galway inter-county team from 2007 until 2009.

== Playing career ==
=== Minor and under-21 ===
Sammon first came to prominence on the inter-county scene as a member of the Galway minor football team in the early 1960s. He later progressed to the Galway under-21 football team. In 1965, he lined out in the provincial under-21 decider with Mayo providing the opposition. Galway won the game by 3–9 to 1–13, and Sammon collected a Connacht Under-21 Football Championship title. His side was defeated in the subsequent All-Ireland semi-final.

=== Senior ===
Sammon joined the Galway senior inter-county team as a nineteen-year-old in 1966. In the Connacht final, Galway secured a 0–12 to 1–8 victory over Mayo, winning Sammon a first Connacht Senior Football Championship winners' medal. Galway beat Cork by 2 points in the All-Ireland semi-final, reaching their fourth consecutive championship final, this time with Meath providing the opposition. It was Sammon's first championship decider, and Galway were looking for a third All-Ireland title in-a-row, while Meath were looking for their third All-Ireland title ever. Galway's Mattie McDonagh scored the only goal of the game, when a long clearance found him unmarked at the edge of the Meath square. At half-time Meath trailed by 1–6 to 0–1. They fought back after the interval; however, Galway won their three-in-a-row by 1–10 to 0–7. It was Sammon's first All-Ireland winners' medal.

Galway did not achieve four-in-a-row the following season, as Sammon's side were defeated in the early stages of the 1967 provincial championship. The team regrouped and qualified for the provincial decider again in 1968. Reigning champions Mayo were the opponents in a game which Galway won 2–10 to 2–9. Sammon added a second provincial winners' medal to his collection. There would be no subsequent All-Ireland final appearance as soon-to-be champions Down narrowly defeated Galway in the semi-final.

In 1969 Galway exited the championship at the hands of Mayo in the Connacht final after a draw and a replay. Sammon's side was back in the provincial final again in 1970, this time with Roscommon providing the opposition in the first eighty-minute decider. Sammon's side won comfortably by 2–15 to 1–8. In the subsequent All-Ireland semi-final, however, Meath beat Galway by 0–15 to 0–11.

In 1971 Sammon was appointed captain of the Galway team. His side retained their Connacht title that year but not without some difficulty. Sligo were the opponents and held Sammon's side to a 2–15 apiece draw. In the replay, Galway secured a narrow 1–17 to 3–10 victory. It was Sammon's fourth Connacht winners' medal. A second All-Ireland final appearance beckoned with Offaly lining out in opposition. In the game, a Murt Connor goal gave Offaly a lead; however, Galway's Séamus Leyden scored an equalising goal almost immediately. Offaly tacked on three more points to secure a 1–14 to 2–8 win and their first All-Ireland title. In spite of this defeat Sammon was later included on the very first GAA All-Star team.

Galway surrendered their provincial title at an early stage in 1972, however, Sammon was appointed captain again in 1973. That year his side faced Mayo in the Connacht decider. A high-scoring 1–17 to 2–12 score line gave Galway the win and gave Sammon a fifth Connacht title. After an absence of seven years the westerners were back in the All-Ireland final. Cork provided the opposition, and Jimmy Barry-Murphy scored the first of his two goals after just two minutes to give Cork the initiative. Jimmy Barrett scored the third of Cork's goals as a tally of 2–13 was not enough to save Sammon's side. A seven-point deficit resulted in another All-Ireland final defeat for Sammon. A second All-Star award quickly followed.

In 1974 Galway retained their Connacht title. A 2–14 to 0–8 win over Roscommon gave Sammon his sixth provincial winners' medal. For the second year in succession and for the third time in four years, Galway lined out in the All-Ireland championship decider. Dublin were the opponents on that occasion. The men from the west took a 1–4 to 0–5 lead at half-time. In the 52nd minute, Galway were awarded a penalty which Sammon stepped up to take. Goalkeeper Paddy Cullen made no mistake and saved the shot. 'The Dub's' later went on to take the lead as Galway collapsed. A 0–14 to 1–6 score line resulted in a demoralising third All-Ireland defeat for Sammon.

An early exit from the championship was Galway's lot in 1975, however, the team bounced back in 1976. A 1–8 apiece draw was the result of the Connacht final against Roscommon. The replay was far more conclusive with Sammon collecting a seventh provincial winners' medal after a 1–14 to 0–9 victory. The Galway revival was short-lived as Sammon's side were subsequently defeated by Dublin in the All-Ireland semi-final.

The end of the 1970s belonged to Roscommon in the provincial championship. Back-to-back Connacht final defeats in 1977 and 1978 were followed by an early exit from the championship in 1979. This defeat brought Sammon's inter-county career to an end.

== Coaching ==
Sammon began coaching Gaelic football shortly after his debut as a 19-year-old for Galway on the 1966 team that won a third consecutive All-Ireland SFC title. Sammon wrote a Gaelic football coaching manual that was published in 2003. He later wrote a second 132-page Gaelic football coaching manual.

=== Galway senior manager ===
==== First year ====
In September 2007, Sammon was confirmed as the new Galway senior football boss, receiving a three-year term and succeeding Peter Ford in the hot seat. His appointment meant that Galway had a native in charge of their premier football team for the first time in almost 10 years. Sammon is the second oldest inter-county manager on the scene at the moment after Mick O'Dwyer. Sammon's backroom team includes former Galway defender Richie Fahey, Dunmore McHales Tom Ryder and another former county player, Jimmy O'Dea, of Tuam Stars.

On 19 May 2008, Galway won Connacht Senior Football Championship first round clash against Roscommon at Pearse Stadium by a comfortable 2–16 to 0–06 scoreline. Sammon said "I didn't think we would win by so much. I would have settled for one or two points, I thought that's how close it would be." after the match. Their semi-final clash against Leitrim also at Pearse Stadium, saw Galway win by 2–14 to 1–13. Sammon wasn't entirely satisfied with Galway's performance and felt there was plenty of room for improvement ahead of the Connacht final against Mayo. "Goals are so important and they win games. We were fortunate when we got two and were disappointed that we gave one away. We were giving away goals in the early away goals in the early rounds of the league and we worked on stopping that, so we're not happy."

On 13 July 2008, Galway won their 44th Connacht SFC after beating Mayo by 2–12 to 1–14 in a provincial decider at McHale Park. Sammon warmly greeted the victory after the final. "Any time you can win, it certainly stands to you, particularly down here in Castlebar. It is a very difficult places to win in," he said.

In the quarter-finals, Galway played reigning All-Ireland Champions Kerry. A spirited performance from the Tribesmen was not enough as Kerry won by 5 points, 1–21 to 1–16. Sammon said after the match, "Kerry were brilliant today. They just proved what a great team they are. Any team that is going for three-in-a-row deserves the respect and plaudits that they get. Looking back, I think that it has been a successful year for Galway as we brought on a number of young players. I felt at one stage when we got the goal that if we had pressed forward and gotten a point or two more, we might have gone ahead. But that is the sign of a great team – any time they are under pressure that they are able to come back and score". In his assessment of Galway's season, he added "Looking back, I think that it has been a successful year for Galway as we brought on a number of young players."

==== Second year ====
Galway's opening game of the 2009 Connacht SFC was away to London, Galway winning that by a scoreline of 1–18 to 1–07. Galway then played Sligo in the Connacht SFC semi-final, a game in which only a point from Joe Bergin and a Seán Armstrong goal in injury time separated the sides, as Galway won by a scoreline of 1–13 to 0-12, and advanced to the county's fifth consecutive Connacht SFC final. There Galway played Mayo, that team approaching the match after a 3–18 to 0–07 win against Roscommon. Mayo led for much of the final, with the score at 2–11 to 0–10 late in the game. Galway attempted a late fightback, beginning with a Michael Meehan free and — with 72 minutes on the clock — Meehan scored a goal that tied the game at 2–11 to 1–14. In the 73rd minute, however, Peadár Gardiner of Mayo scored the winning point for his team. Galway entered the final round of the 2009 All-Ireland SFC qualifiers. The county lost its game to Donegal by one point.

Sammon departed in August 2009.

Sporting positions
Preceded by Tommy Keenan	Galway Senior Football Captain; 1971	Succeeded by
Preceded by	Galway Senior Football Captain; 1973	Succeeded by
Preceded by Peter Ford	Galway Senior Football Manager; 2007–2009	Succeeded by Joe Kernan
