= Cork–Donegal Gaelic football rivalry =

Sports rivalry in Ireland

Cork–Donegal
- Location: County Cork; County Donegal
- Teams: Cork; Donegal
- First meeting: Cork 1-11 - 1-10 Donegal; 2006 All-Ireland quarter-final (5 August 2006)
- Latest meeting: Cork 0-17 - 1-13 Donegal 2026 All-Ireland Round 2A (13 June 2026)

Statistics
- Total meetings: 6
- Top scorer: Paul Kerrigan (2-7)
- All-time series: Cork 4-2 Donegal
- Largest victory: Cork 1-27 - 2-10 Donegal; 2009 All-Ireland quarter-final (2 AUgust 2009)

The Cork–Donegal rivalry is a Gaelic football rivalry between Irish county teams Cork and Donegal, whose first championship meeting was in 2006. The fixture has been an infrequent one in the history of the championship, and therefore the rivalry is not as intense between the two teams. Cork's home ground is Páirc Uí Chaoimh and Donegal's home ground is MacCumhaill Park; however, all of their championship meetings have been held at neutral venues, usually Croke Park.

While Cork have the second highest number of Munster titles and Donegal are sixth on the roll of honour in Ulster, they have also enjoyed success in the All-Ireland Senior Football Championship, having won 9 championship titles between them to date.

== Statistics ==
Team	All-Ireland	Provincial	National League	Total
Cork	7	37	8	52
Donegal	2	8	1	11
Combined	9	45	9	63

== All-time results ==
=== Legend ===
Cork win
Donegal win

=== Senior ===
No.	Date	Winners	Score	Runners-up	Venue	Stage
1.	5 August 2006	Cork	1-11 - 1-10	Donegal	Croke Park	All-Ireland quarter-final
2.	2 August 2009	Cork (2)	1-27 - 2-10	Donegal	Croke Park	All-Ireland quarter-final
3.	26 August 2012	Donegal	0-16 - 1-11	Cork	Croke Park	All-Ireland semi-final
4.	30 July 2016	Donegal (2)	0-21 - 1-15	Cork	Croke Park	All-Ireland qualifier
5.	1 June 2024	Cork (3)	3-09 - 0-16	Donegal	Páirc Uí Rinn	All-Ireland qualifier
6.	13 June 2026	Cork (4)	0-17 - 1-13	Donegal	MacCumhaill Park	All-Ireland qualifier

=== Junior ===
No.	Date	Winners	Score	Runners-up	Venue	Stage
1.	3 September 1933	Donegal	1-09 - 2-05	Cork	Croke Park	All-Ireland semi-final

=== Minor ===
No.	Date	Winners	Score	Runners-up	Venue	Stage
1.	1 August 1985	Cork	2-05 - 0-09	Donegal	Croke Park	All-Ireland semi-final
2.	11 August 1991	Cork (2)	0-12 - 1-06	Donegal	Croke Park	All-Ireland semi-final
3.	30 July 2016	Donegal	2-13 - 0-13	Cork	Croke Park	All-Ireland quarter-final

== Records ==
=== Scorelines ===
- Biggest championship win:
  - For Cork: Cork 1-27 - 2-10 Donegal, All-Ireland quarter-final, Croke Park, 2 August 2009
  - For Donegal: Donegal 0-16 - 1-11 Cork, All-Ireland semi-final, Croke Park, 26 August 2012
- Highest aggregate:
  - Cork 1-27 - 2-10 Donegal, All-Ireland quarter-final, Croke Park, 2 August 2009

=== Top scorers ===
Team	Player	Score	Total
Cork	Paul Kerrigan	2-7	13
Donegal	Michael Murphy; Patrick McBrearty	0-11	11

=== Attendance ===
- Highest attendance:
  - 55,169 - Donegal 0-16 - 1-11 Cork, All-Ireland semi-final, Croke Park, 26 August 2012
