= Tomás Meehan =

Galway Gaelic footballer

Personal information
- Native name: Tomás Ó Míocháin (Irish)
- Born: 15 March 1977 (age 49)
- Height: 5 ft 11 in (180 cm)

Sport
- Sport: Gaelic football
- Position: Right corner back
Club
- Years: Club
- Caltra
Club titles
- Galway titles: 1
- Connacht titles: 1
- All-Ireland Titles: 1
Inter-county
- Years: County
- 1997–2006: Galway
Inter-county titles
- Connacht titles: 5
- All-Irelands: 2
- NFL: 0
- All Stars: 0

Tomás Meehan (born 15 March 1977) is an Irish former Gaelic footballer who played for the Galway county team. He played his club football with Caltra.

== Playing career ==
Meehan won a Hogan Cup with St Jarlath's College in 1994. Meehan was also on the Galway minor team that lost the All-Ireland final to Kerry later that year. Meehan was joined by his brother Declan on both teams.

Meehan was corner back on the Galway team that won the All-Ireland in 1998, beating Kildare. Galway reached the final again in 2000, losing to Kerry after a replay. Meehan won his second All-Ireland medal as a sub as Galway beat Meath in the 2001 final. Meehan announced his retirement from inter-county football in January 2006.

In 2003, Caltra reached the final of the Galway Senior Football Championship for the first time since 1975, facing Killererin. Caltra were 3–11 to 0–5 winners to win their first title. Caltra went on to claim their first Connacht title by beating Sligo champions Curry in the final. In the new year, Caltra qualified for the All-Ireland Club final by beating The Loup on 22 February. On St Patrick's Day 2004, Meehan was in midfield as Caltra took on Kerry champions An Ghaeltacht in Croke Park. Caltra were winners on a 0–13 to 0–12 scoreline. Meehan was joined by four brothers – Declan, Michael, Enda, and Noel as captain all starting on the team.

== Honours ==
Galway

- All-Ireland Senior Football Championship (2): 1998, 2001
- Connacht Senior Football Championship (5): 1998, 2000, 2002, 2003, 2005
- Connacht Under-21 Football Championship (2): 1996, 1998
- Connacht Minor Football Championship (2): 1994, 1995

Caltra

- All-Ireland Senior Club Football Championship (1): 2003–04
- Connacht Senior Club Football Championship (1): 2003
- Galway Senior Football Championship (1): 2003
- Galway Intermediate Football Championship (1): 1997

St Jarlath's College

- Hogan Cup (1): 1994
- Connacht Colleges Senior Football Championship (1): 1994
