= Barry Dooney =

Irish Gaelic footballer

Barry Dooney is an Irish former Gaelic footballer who played for Salthill–Knocknacarra and was involved in league and championship football during his time playing for the senior Galway county team throughout the 2000s. He attended the Galway-Mayo Institute of Technology, and played for GMIT in the Sigerson Cup. Dooney also played for Nortel in the All-Ireland Inter-Firm Championship. He played in various defensive and other positions, including right corner-back and midfield.

Dooney participated in his club's 2005–06 All-Ireland Senior Club Football Championship title-winning campaign. The referee issued him with a straight red card in his club's All-Ireland Club SFC quarter-final victory over Tír Chonaill Gaels. Following the suspension imposed on Dooney for the All-Ireland Club SFC semi-final game against Kilmacud Crokes, and with Salthill qualifying for the All-Ireland Club SFC final, the club held a practice match especially for him at Pearse Stadium in order to prepare him for the decider.
