= 2002 All-Ireland Minor Football Championship =

Gaelic football competition

Championship details

All-Ireland Champions
- Winning team: Derry (4th win)
- Captain: Gerard O'Kane
- Manager: Chris Brown

All-Ireland Finalists
- Losing team: Meath

Provincial Champions
- Munster: Kerry
- Leinster: Longford
- Ulster: Derry
- Connacht: Galway

The 2002 All-Ireland Minor Football Championship was the 71st staging of the All-Ireland Minor Football Championship, the Gaelic Athletic Association's premier inter-county Gaelic football tournament for boys under the age of 18.

Tyrone entered the championship as defending champions, however, they were defeated by Derry in the Ulster final.

On 22 September 2002, Derry won the championship following a 1–12 to 0–8 defeat of Meath in the All-Ireland final. This was their fourth All-Ireland title overall and their first in 13 championship seasons.

== New format ==
Since its inception in 1929, the championship had always been played on a straight knock-out basis. If any team was defeated at any stage of the provincial or All-Ireland championships it meant automatic elimination. This system was deemed the fairest as the All-Ireland champions would always be the team who won all of their games.

After introducing a "back door" system in the All-Ireland Hurling Championship in 1997, a similar second chance system was now introduced for the football championship. Defeated provincial finalists would be allowed to re-enter the All-Ireland Championship at the quarter-final stage where they would be paired with a provincial champion and the chance to advance to the semi-final stage. While the format was criticised for giving a team no incentive for winning their respective provincial championship, the new format did provide an extra layer of games for developing young talent.

== Results ==
=== Connacht Minor Football Championship ===
Quarter-Final

| 2002 Quarter-Final | Galway | 2-14 - 1-7 | Roscommon |

Semi-Finals

| June 2002 Semi-Final | Leitrim | 0-17 - 0-7 | Sligo | Markievicz Park, Sligo |

| June 2002 Semi-Final | Galway | 2-11 - 2-8 | Mayo | Dr Hyde Park, Roscommon |

Final

| 30 June 2002 Final | Galway | 1-12 - 0-6 | Leitrim | McHale Park, Castlebar |

=== Leinster Minor Football Championship ===
Rob Robin

| 2002 Rob Robin | Carlow | 2-9 - 1-12 | Kilkenny |

| 2002 Rob Robin | Wicklow | 1-5 - 0-13 | Longford |

| 2002 Rob Robin | Wicklow | 2-15 - 0-6 | Kilkenny |

| 2002 Rob Robin | Longford | 4-12 - 2-3 | Louth |

| 2002 Rob Robin | Wicklow | 1-15 - 0-4 | Carlow | Aughrim Park, Aughrim |

| 2002 Rob Robin | Louth | 2-9 - 0-4 | Kilkenny | Drogheda Park, Drogheda |

| 2002 Rob Robin | Longford | 3-13 - 0-3 | Carlow | Pearse Park, Longford |

| 2002 Rob Robin | Louth | 1-10 - 2-6 | Wicklow | Drogheda Park, Drogheda |

| 2002 Rob Robin | Longford | 3-13 - 0-5 | Kilkenny | Páirc Tailteann, Navan |

Quarter-Finals

| 2002 Quarter-Final | Meath | 1-9 - 1-7 | Kildare | Páirc Tailteann, Navan |

| 2002 Quarter-Final | Laois | 2-13 - 1-6 | Wexford | Wexford Park, Wexford |

| 2002 Quarter-Final | Dublin | 1-16 - 3-4 | Westmeath | Swords |

| 2002 Quarter-Final | Longford | 2-8 - 0-9 | Offaly | Pearse Park, Longford |

Semi-Finals

| 2002 Semi-Final | Meath | 2-7 - 1-8 | Laois | Cusack Park, Mullingar |

| 2002 Semi-Final | Longford | 1-8 - 0-7 | Dublin | Cusack Park, Mullingar |

Final

| 14 July 2002 Final | Longford | 3-8 - 3-5 | Meath | Croke Park, Dublin |

=== Munster Minor Football Championship ===
Rob Robin

| 2002 Rob Robin | Tipperary | 2-11 - 2-9 | Kerry | FitzGerald Park, Kilmallock |

| 2002 Rob Robin | Limerick | 1-11 - 1-4 | Clare | Gaelic Grounds, Limerick |

| 2002 Rob Robin | Waterford | 3-3 - 0-12 | Cork | Carrigtwohill |

| 2002 Rob Robin | Waterford | 1-6 - 0-9 | Clare | Fraher Field, Dungarvan |

| 2002 Rob Robin | Tipperary | 0-13 - 0-13 | Cork | FitzGerald Park, Kilmallock |

| 2002 Rob Robin | Kerry | 2-13 - 1-4 | Limerick | Gaelic Grounds, Limerick |

| 2002 Rob Robin | Cork | 2-9- 1-2 | Clare |

| 2002 Rob Robin | Tipperary | 0-10 - 0-7 | Limerick |

| 2002 Rob Robin | Kerry | 2-14- 0-7 | Waterford |

| 2002 Rob Robin | Kerry | 0-12- 0-9 | Cork | Austin Stack Park, Tralee |

| 2002 Rob Robin | Waterford | 2-6- 1-11 | Limerick | Dungannon |

| 2002 Rob Robin | Clare | 3-9- 1-12 | Tipperary | Bruff |

| 2002 Rob Robin | Cork | 1-10 - 0-9 | Limerick | Páirc Uí Chaoimh, Cork |

| 2002 Rob Robin | Kerry | 2-9 - 1-8 | Clare | Hennessy Memorial Park, Miltown Malbay |

| 2002 Rob Robin | Tipperary | 3-14 - 2-6 | Waterford | Páirc Mac Gearailt, Fermoy |

Semi-Finals

| 2002 Semi-Final | Kerry | 1-15 - 1-14 | Cork | Austin Stack Park, Tralee |

| 2002 Semi-Final | Limerick | 2-4 - 1-9 | Tipperary | Páirc Mac Gearailt, Fermoy |

Final

| 14 July 2002 Final | Kerry | 3-15 - 2-6 | Tipperary | Semple Stadium, Thurles |

=== Ulster Minor Football Championship ===
Rob Robin

| 2002 Rob Robin | Cavan | 0-12 - 0-8 | Donegal | Breffni Park, Cavan |

| 2002 Rob Robin | Monaghan | 0-11 - 0-10 | Fermanagh | St Tiernach's Park, Clones |

| 2002 Rob Robin | Tyrone | 0-12 - 0-12 | Armagh | St Tiernach's Park, Clones |

| 2002 Rob Robin Replay | Tyrone | 2-12 - 1-8 | Armagh | Naas |

| 2002 Rob Robin | Derry | 1-15 - 0-4 | Antrim | Casement Park, Belfast |

Quarter-Final

| 2002 Quarter-Final | Cavan | 2-13 - 0-12 | Down | Pearse Park, Ballybay |

Semi-Finals

| 2002 Semi-Final | Tyrone | 3-11 - 1-5 | Monaghan | Brewster Park, Enniskillen |

| 2002 Semi-Final | Derry | 0-14 - 0-10 | Cavan | Brewster Park, Enniskillen |

Final

| 7 July 2002 Final | Derry | 0-12 - 0-11 | Tyrone | St Tiernach's Park, Clones |

=== All-Ireland Minor Football Championship ===
Quarter-Finals

| August 2002 Quarter-Final | Galway | 1-7 - 1-8 | Meath | Dr. Hyde Park, Roscommon |

| August 2002 Quarter-Final | Longford | 4-6 - 1-6 | Leitrim | Dr. Hyde Park, Roscommon |

| August 2002 Quarter-Final | Kerry | 3-14 - 1-8 | Tyrone | O'Moore Park, Portlaoise |

| August 2002 Quarter-Final | Derry | 5-13 - 1-3 | Tipperary | Páirc Tailteann, Navan |

Semi-Finals

| 25 August 2002 Semi-Final | Kerry | 1-11 - 2-13 | Meath | Croke Park, Dublin |

| 1 September 2002 Semi-Final | Derry | 3-13 - 1-03 | Longford | Croke Park, Dublin |

Final

| 22 September 2002 Final | Derry | 1-12 - 0-08 | Meath | Croke Park, Dublin |

== Championship statistics ==
=== Miscellaneous ===
- Meath become the first beaten team to reach the All-Ireland final.
