= 2003 All-Ireland Minor Football Championship =

Gaelic football competition

Championship details

All-Ireland Champions
- Winning team: Laois (3rd win)

All-Ireland Finalists
- Losing team: Dublin

Provincial Champions
- Munster: Kerry
- Leinster: Dublin
- Ulster: Tyrone
- Connacht: Galway

The 2003 All-Ireland Minor Football Championship was the 72nd staging of the All-Ireland Minor Football Championship, the Gaelic Athletic Association's premier inter-county Gaelic football tournament for boys under the age of 18.

Derry entered the championship as defending champions, however, they were defeated in the Ulster Championship.

On 12 October 2003, Laois won the championship following a 2-10 to 1-9 defeat of Dublin in the All-Ireland final. This was their third All-Ireland title overall and their first title in six championship seasons.

== Results ==
=== Connacht Minor Football Championship ===
Semi-finals

| 2003 Semi-Final | Mayo | 1-11 - 1-10 | Sligo | Markievicz Park, Sligo |

| 2003 Semi-Final | Galway | 2-7 - 1-9 | Leitrim | Pearse Stadium, Galway |

Final

| 6 July 2003 Final | Galway | 1-9 - 0-9 | Mayo | Pearse Stadium, Galway |

=== Leinster Minor Football Championship ===
Rob robin

| 2003 Rob Robin | Carlow | 4-15 - 0-11 | Kilkenny | Nowlan Park, Kilkenny |

| 2003 Rob Robin | Longford | 3-16 - 0-11 | Wicklow | Ballymahon |

| 2003 Rob Robin | Westmeath | 3-7 - 2-10 | Offaly |

| 2003 Rob Robin | Dublin | 1-1 - 4-18 | Laois |

| 2003 Rob Robin | Dublin | 0-14 - 1-5 | Meath |

| 2003 Rob Robin | Kildare | 1-10 - 1-3 | Wicklow |

| 2003 Rob Robin | Wexford | 1-10 - 1-15 | Dublin |

| 2003 Rob Robin | Westmeath | 2-12 - 1-10 | Dublin |

| 2003 Rob Robin | Offaly | 2-10 - 0-15 | Laois |

| 2003 Rob Robin | Kildare | 0-16 - 0-9 | Meath |

| 2003 Rob Robin | Louth | 0-12 - 0-9 | Longford |

| 2003 Rob Robin | Wicklow | 5-9 - 3-6 | Kilkenny |

| 2003 Rob Robin | Louth | 5-18 - 0-3 | Kilkenny |

| 2003 Rob Robin | Wicklow | 1-8 - 1-11 | Carlow |

| 2003 Rob Robin | Louth | 2-12 - 0-1 | Carlow |

| 2003 Rob Robin | Louth | 3-12 - 1-8 | Wicklow | Aughrim Park, Aughrim |

| 2003 Rob Robin | Longford | 2-13 - 2-9 | Carlow | Dr. Cullen Park, Carlow |

| 2003 Rob Robin | Meath | 2-4 - 0-14 | Dublin | Páirc Tailteann, Navan |

| 2003 Rob Robin | Kildare | 1-14 - 2-2 | Wexford | Wexford Park, Wexford |

| 2003 Rob Robin | Louth | 4-7 - 0-12 | Offaly | Ardee |

| 2003 Rob Robin | Laois | 3-10 - 0-4 | Westmeath | Cusack Park, Mullingar |

Quarter-final

| 2003 Quarter-Final | Offaly | 0-7 - 2-16 | Kildare |

Semi-finals

| 2003 Semi-Final | Laois | 1-14 - 1-5 | Kildare | O'Connor Park, Tullamore |

| 2003 Semi-Final | Louth | 1-8 - 0-11 | Dublin | Páirc Tailteann, Navan |

| 2003 Semi-Final Replay | Louth | 1-7 - 1-12 | Dublin | Páirc Tailteann, Navan |

Final

| 20 July 2003 Final | Laois | 1-9 - 1-11 | Dublin | Croke Park, Dublin |

=== Munster Minor Football Championship ===
Rob robin

| 2003 Rob Robin | Clare | 0-11 - 0-4 | Limerick | Cusack Park, Ennis |

| 2003 Rob Robin | Cork | 3-14 - 2-2 | Waterford | Fraher Field, Dungarvan |

| 2003 Rob Robin | Kerry | 2-13 - 1-7 | Tipperary | FitzGerald Park, Kilmallock |

| 2003 Rob Robin | Clare | 0-8 - 1-5 | Waterford | Cusack Park, Ennis |

| 2003 Rob Robin | Kerry | 3-10 - 2-5 | Limerick | Fitzgerald Stadium, Killarney |

| 2003 Rob Robin | Cork | 1-18 - 0-7 | Clare | Páirc Uí Chaoimh, Cork |

| 2003 Rob Robin | Tipperary | 2-6 - 2-5 | Limerick | Páirc Mac Gearailt, Fermoy |

| 2003 Rob Robin | Waterford | 1-9 - 0-21 | Kerry | Cappoquin |

| 2003 Rob Robin | Cork | 2-12 - 1-11 | Kerry | Páirc Uí Chaoimh, Cork |

| 2003 Rob Robin | Limerick | 0-16 - 1-7 | Waterford | Cappamore |

| 2003 Rob Robin | Tipperary | 1-10 - 4-9 | Clare | Claughan |

| 2003 Rob Robin | Tipperary | 2-15 - 1-3 | Waterford | Páirc Mac Gearailt, Fermoy |

| 2003 Rob Robin | Kerry | 0-9 - 1-4 | Clare | Ballylongford |

| 2003 Rob Robin | Cork | 1-12 - 1-10 | Limerick | Newcastlewest |

Semi-finals

| 2003 Semi-Final | Cork | 2-18 - 0-8 | Tipperary | FitzGerald Park, Kilmallock |

| 2003 Semi-Final | Kerry | 1-10 - 0-4 | Clare | Austin Stack Park, Tralee |

Final

| 13 July 2003 Final | Kerry | 1-14 - 0-10 | Cork | Fitzgerald Stadium, Killarney |

=== Ulster Minor Football Championship ===
Rob robin

| 2003 Rob Robin | Armagh | 0-13 - 1-9 | Monaghan | St Tiernach's Park, Clones |

| 2003 Rob Robin | Tyrone | 2-9 - 2-9 | Derry | St Tiernach's Park, Clones |

| 2003 Rob Robin | Cavan | 0-11 - 1-7 | Derry | Casement Park, Belfast |

| 2003 Rob Robin Replay | Tyrone | 2-7 - 0-12 | Derry | Casement Park, Belfast |

| 2003 Rob Robin | Fermanagh | 1-4 - 0-7 | Donegal |

| 2003 Rob Robin Replay | Fermanagh | 1-10 - 0-11 | Donegal |

| 2003 Rob Robin | Down | 2-14 - 0-6 | Armagh | Casement Park, Belfast |

| 2003 Rob Robin | Down | 0-8 - 2-3 | Fermanagh | St Tiernach's Park, Clones |

Semi-final

| 2003 Semi-Final | Tyrone | 3-13 - 1-3 | Fermanagh | Brewster Park, Enniskillen |

Final

| 13 July 2003 Final | Tyrone | 3-9 - 0-9 | Fermanagh | St Tiernach's Park, Clones |

=== All-Ireland Minor Football Championship ===
Quarter-finals

| August 2003 Quarter-Final | Galway | 2-10 - 2-11 | Cork | Cusack Park, Ennis |

| August 2003 Quarter-Final | Kerry | 2-10 - 1-8 | Mayo | Cusack Park, Ennis |

| August 2003 Quarter-Final | Dublin | 0-15 - 1-8 | Fermanagh | Pearse Park, Longford |

| August 2003 Quarter-Final | Laois | 0-15 - 1-8 | Tyrone | Pearse Park, Longford |

Semi-finals

| 24 August 2003 Semi-Final | Kerry | 2-10 - 2-15 | Laois | Croke Park, Dublin |

| 31 August 2003 Semi-Final | Cork | 1-9 - 1-18 | Dublin | Croke Park, Dublin |

Finals

| 28 September 2003 Final | Laois | 1-11 - 1-11 | Dublin | Croke Park, Dublin |

| 12 October 2003 Final replay | Laois | 1-12 - 0-08 | Dublin | Dr. Cullen Park, Carlow |

== Championship statistics ==
=== Miscellaneous ===
- The All-Ireland final is contested by two teams from the same province for the first time ever. Laois become the first "back door" champions, having earlier been defeated by Dublin in the Leinster final.
