= Declan Meehan (Gaelic footballer) =

Galway Gaelic footballer

Personal information
- Native name: Déaglán Ó Míocháin (Irish)
- Born: 16 January 1976 (age 50) Ballinasloe, Ireland
- Height: 1.75 m (5 ft 9 in)

Sport
- Sport: Gaelic football
- Position: Right half back
Club
- Years: Club
- 1993–2016: Caltra
Club titles
- Galway titles: 1
- Connacht titles: 1
- All-Ireland Titles: 1
Inter-county
- Years: County
- 1996–2011: Galway
Inter-county titles
- Connacht titles: 6
- All-Irelands: 2
- NFL: 0
- All Stars: 2

Declan Meehan (born 16 January 1976) is an Irish Gaelic footballer from County Galway, Ireland. He plays his club football with Caltra and played inter-county football for the Galway team from 1996 to 2011. He was regarded as one of the most talented and skillful wing half-backs in the country.

== Playing career ==
=== Club ===
In 2004, Meehan was part of the Caltra team that had a memorable run to All-Ireland Club Championship glory. After coming through the Galway and Connacht club finals, which first time triumphs for the club, Caltra met An Ghaeltacht of Munster. In a close exciting encounter, Caltra prevailed by one point, 0–13 to 0–12. His brothers, Michael, Tomás, Enda and Noel, who captained the team, were all starting players on the team.

=== Inter-county ===
He won All-Ireland Senior Football Championship medals with Galway in 1998 and 2001, he also won 6 Connacht Senior Football Championship medals. As well as an All Ireland medal in 2001 he also won a second All Star in a row and was named Player of the Year. He was part of the Ireland international rules team in 2002.

In January 2011, Meehan announced his retirement from inter-county football.

== Biography ==
He attended the famous St. Jarlath's College and won a Hogan Cup medal with them in 1994.

He comes from a famous footballing family in Galway. His brother Tomás also played in the All Ireland wins in 1998 and 2001, and his youngest brother Michael also played for the Galway senior team. The passion of football in the Meehan family was clearly evident when 5 brothers started on the successful All-Ireland Club Championship Caltra side while eldest brother Seamus was a sub on that day. Declan's sister, Mairead, was a sporting star in her own right. She was a very useful camogie player. A teacher who graduated from DCU, she gained an All-Ireland junior camogie medal with Holy Rosary College. Mairead died in 2007 from osteosarcoma.

Awards
Preceded by Seamus Moynihan	All Stars Footballer of the Year; 2001	Succeeded by Kieran McGeeney
