= Finian Hanley =

Galway Gaelic footballer

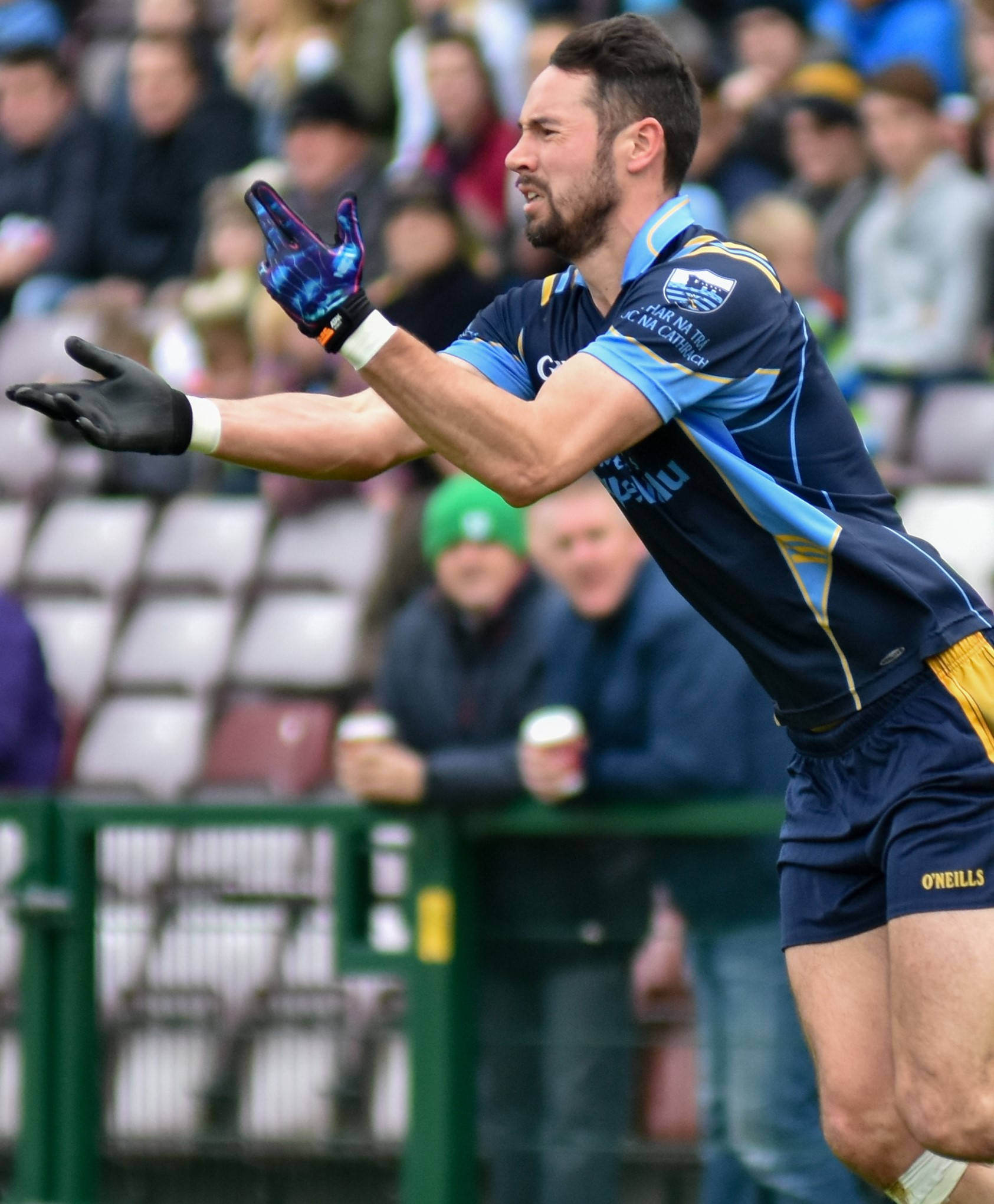
- Hanley with Salthill-Knocknacarra in 2016

Personal information
- Native name: Finian Ó hAinle (Irish)
- Born: 4 January 1985 (age 41) Galway, Ireland
- Height: 1.9 m (6 ft 3 in)

Sport
- Sport: Gaelic football
- Position: Full Back
Club
- Years: Club
- 2002–2021: Salthill–Knocknacarra
Club titles
- Galway titles: 2
- Connacht titles: 1
- All-Ireland Titles: 1
Inter-county
- Years: County
- 2005–2017: Galway
Inter-county titles
- Connacht titles: 3

Finian Hanley (born 4 January 1985) is a former Gaelic football player from Galway. He played his club football with Salthill–Knocknacarra and inter-county football for Galway from 2005 to 2017. He played in the full-back position. In 2008 he was nominated for an All Stars Award.

== Inter-county ==
In 2005, Hanley was a member of Galway's Under-21 All-Ireland winning team, winning the final against Down with inspired performances from Michael Meehan, Barry Cullinane and club team-mate Seán Armstrong.

After being a key figure in Galway's successful Minor and Under-21 teams of recent years, Hanley made his Senior debut against Mayo in the 2005 Connacht SFC final. He has since made the full-back position his own, winning three Connacht SFC titles, in 2005, 2008 and 2016.

Hanley was a part of Salthill–Knocknacarra's triumphant All-Ireland Club Championship-winning side in 2006. They defeated Antrim GAA club St Gall's in the final by 0–7 to 0-6. Hanley was named Man Of The Match for his performance, repelling several of the Antrim side's attacks.

== International rules ==
In 2008, he represented Ireland against Australia in Australia in the International Rules Series in which they won.

In 2010, he was vice-captain of the Irish team in the International Rules Series in Ireland in which they lost out narrowly.

In 2011, he was chosen to represent his country once more

In 2013, he was chosen to represent his country again. He played in the first test in Cavan but a hamstring tear ruled him out of the second test at Croke Park a week later.

In 2014, he was again chosen to represent Ireland in the one test series in Perth. Ireland narrowly lost out to Australia on this occasion.

== Honours ==
=== Club ===
- Galway Senior Football Championship (2): 2005, 2012
- Connacht Senior Club Football Championship (1): 2005
- All-Ireland Senior Club Football Championship (1): 2006

=== County ===
- Connacht Under-21 Football Championship (1): 2005
- All-Ireland Under-21 Football Championship (1): 2005
- Connacht Senior Football Championship (3): 2005, 2008, 2016
- FBD Insurance League (4): 2006, 2008, 2009, 2017

=== Individual ===
- Man of The Match All-Ireland Club Final (1): 2006
- International Rules (5): 2008, 2010, 2011, 2013, 2014

Preceded by Joe Bergin	Galway Senior Football Captain; 2012-2014	Succeeded by Paul Conroy
