= 2007 All-Ireland Under-21 Football Championship =

Gaelic football competition

Championship details

All-Ireland Champions
- Winning team: Cork (10th win)
- Captain: Andrew O'Sullivan

All-Ireland Finalists
- Losing team: Laois

Provincial Champions
- Munster: Cork
- Leinster: Laois
- Ulster: Armagh
- Connacht: Mayo

The 2007 All-Ireland Under-21 Football Championship was the 44th staging of the All-Ireland Under-21 Football Championship since its establishment by the Gaelic Athletic Association in 1964.

Mayo entered the championship as defending champions, however, they were defeated by Laois in the All-Ireland semi-final.

On 5 May 2007, Cork won the championship following a 2-10 to 0-15 defeat of Laois in the All-Ireland final. This was their 10th All-Ireland title overall and their first in 13 championship seasons.

== Results ==
=== Munster Under-21 Football Championship ===
Quarter-finals

8 March 2007 Quarter-final	Cork	0-17 - 0-09	Limerick	Páirc Uí Rinn, Cork
	D Goulding 0-10 (0-3 frees), C O’Neill 0-3, M Shields, P Kerrigan, F Gould, C Keane 0-1 each.	Report	S Cronin 0-3, K O’Callaghan 0-3 (0-2 frees), M Kelly, G Collins, R Browne 0-1 each.	Referee: P O'Sullivan (Kerry)

10 March 2007 Quarter-final	Clare	1-06 - 0-06	Kerry	Kilmihil
	D Ryan 1-1 (0-1f), S Cullinan 0-2 (1f), P Nagle 0-2 (1f), S Monaghan 0-1.		K O'Leary 0-2 (1f), J Buckley 0-1, A O'Sullivan 0-1, M O'Donoghue 0-1, P O'Connor 0-1 (1f).	Referee: M Corridan (Waterford)

Semi-finals

17 March 2007 Semi-final	Waterford	0-01 - 2-17	Cork	Fraher Field, Dungarvan
	P Hurney 0-1 (1f).		(D Goulding 1-6, C O'Neill 1-1, F Gould 0-4, F Lynch 0-2, G O'Shea, R Leahy, C Callinan, D Cearney 0-1 each), Waterford 0-1.

24 March 2003 Semi-final	Tipperary	5-08 - 0-07	Clare	FitzGerald Park, Kilmallock

Final

7 April 2007 Final	Cork	3-19 - 3-12	Tipperary	Gaelic Grounds, Limerick
	D Goulding 1-6 (1-0 pen, 3f), F Lynch 1-3 (1 sideline), F Gould 1-2 (1 '45'), P Kerrigan 0-4, S Cahalane 0-2 (2f), R Leahy, S O'Donoghue 0-1 each.		B Grogan 3-2, T Dalton 0-7 (6f), B Mulvihill 0-2 (2f), C McGrath 0-1.	Referee: R Hickey (Clare)

=== All-Ireland Under-21 Football Championship ===
Semi-finals

21 April 2007 Semi-final	Laois	0-11 - 0-06	Mayo	Dr. Hyde Park, Roscommon
	MJ Tierney (0-5, 2f, 1 '45'), D Conway (0-2, 1f), C Rogers (0-1), C Óg Greene (0-1); N Donoher (0-1); D Kingston (0-1, 1f).	Report	T Parsons (0-2); M Ronaldson (0-2, 1f), P Hanley (0-1, 1f), E Varley (0-1).	Referee: M Sludden (Tyrone)

22 April 2007 Semi-final	Cork	0-13 - 0-12	Armagh	O'Moore Park, Portlaoise
	D Goulding (0-4, 1f), F Lynch (0-3), F Goold (0-3), C O'Neill (0-2), A O'Sullivan (0-1).	Report	S Forker (0-5, 3f), K O'Rourke (0-2), C Vernon (0-1); P Courtney (0-1), J Lavery (0-1), D McKenna (0-1); G O'Neill (0-1).	Referee: P McGovern (Galway)

Final

5 May 2007 Final	Cork	2-10 - 0-15	Laois	Semple Stadium, Thurles
	D Goulding 1-6 (0-4 frees, 0-1 45); C O’Neill 1-1; F Lynch, S O’Donoghue, P Kerrigan 0-1 each.	Report	MJ Tierney 0-7 (0-5 frees); D Conway 0-3; J O’Loughlin, B Donoher, C Óg Greene, C Rogers, D Brennan 0-1 each.	Attendance: 5,500; Referee: V Neary (Mayo)
