= Caltra GAA =

Gaelic games club in County Galway, Ireland

Caltra
- Cealltrach na Pailíse
- Founded: 1899
- County: Galway
- Colours: Green and White
- Grounds: Caltra GAA Grounds
- Coordinates: 53°26′12.30″N 8°26′10.26″W

Playing kits
Standard colours

Senior Club Championships
	All Ireland	Connacht champions	Galway champions
Football:	1	1	1

Caltra (Irish: Cealltrach) is a Gaelic Athletic Association club based in Caltra, County Galway, Ireland. The club is a member of the Galway GAA and is primarily a Gaelic football club.

Between 2003 and 2004, it secured the Galway, Connacht and All-Ireland Senior Club Football Championship titles for the first time in its history.

== Honours ==
- All-Ireland Senior Club Football Championship (1): 2003–04
- Connacht Senior Club Football Championship (1): 2003
- Galway Senior Football Championship (1): 2003

== Notable players ==
Men's senior players:

- Declan Meehan
- Tomás Meehan
- Michael Meehan
- Cathal Mannion
- Pádraic Mannion
