= 2001 All-Ireland Minor Football Championship =

Gaelic football competition

Championship details

All-Ireland Champions
- Winning team: Tyrone (5th win)

All-Ireland Finalists
- Losing team: Dublin

Provincial Champions
- Munster: Kerry
- Leinster: Dublin
- Ulster: Tyrone
- Connacht: Mayo

The 2001 All-Ireland Minor Football Championship was the 70th staging of the All-Ireland Minor Football Championship, the Gaelic Athletic Association's premier inter-county Gaelic football tournament for boys under the age of 18.

Cork entered the championship as defending champions, however, they were defeated by Kerry in the Munster final.

On 29 September 2001, Tyrone won the championship following a 2–11 to 0–6 defeat of Dublin in the All-Ireland final. This was their fifth All-Ireland title overall and their first in three championship seasons.

== Results ==
=== Connacht Minor Football Championship ===
Quarter-final

May 2001 Quarter-Final	Galway	2-14 - 1-8	Leitrim	Páirc Seán Mac Diarmada, Carrick-on-Shannon

Semi-finals

June 2001 Semi-Final	Galway	2-13 - 1-7	Roscommon	St Jarlath's Park, Tuam

June 2001 Semi-Final	Mayo	4-14 - 0-4	Sligo	McHale Park, Castlebar

Final

1 July 2001 Final	Mayo	1-8 - 0-11	Galway	Dr Hyde Park, Roscommon

7 July 2001 Final Replay	Mayo	0-15 - 0-11	Galway	McHale Park, Castlebar

=== Leinster Minor Football Championship ===
Preliminary round

May 2001 Preliminary round	Dublin	9-21 - 0-2	Kilkenny	Nowlan Park, Kilkenny

May 2001 Preliminary round	Wexford	1-12 - 1-10	Longford	Pearse Park, Longford

May 2001 Preliminary round	Carlow	0-9 - 2-13	Laois	Dr Cullen Park, Carlow

May 2001 Preliminary round	Kildare	2-6 - 2-6	Meath	Páirc Tailteann, Navan

May 2001 Preliminary round Replay	Kildare	0-19 - 1-9	Meath	St Conleth's Park, Newbridge

Quarter-finals

June 2001 Quarter-Final	Offaly	2-13 - 2-9	Laois	O'Connor Park, Tullamore

June 2001 Quarter-Final	Kildare	2-12 - 1-8	Wicklow	St Conleth's Park, Newbridge

June 2001 Quarter-Final	Wexford	1-10 - 1-10	Westmeath	O'Kennedy Park, New Ross

June 2001 Quarter-Final Replay	Wexford	0-7 - 1-14	Westmeath	Cusack Park, Mullingar

June 2001 Quarter-Final	Dublin	4-13 - 0-6	Louth	Parnell Park, Dublin

Semi-finals

June 2001 Semi-Final	Offaly	3-6 - 1-7	Westmeath	O'Connor Park, Tullamore

June 2001 Semi-Final	Dublin	1-7 - 0-6	Kildare	Páirc Tailteann, Navan

Final

15 July 2001 Final	Dublin	1-19 - 0-6	Offaly	Croke Park, Dublin

=== Munster Minor Football Championship ===
Rob robin

2001 Rob Robin	Limerick	1-7 - 2-4	Tipperary	Gaelic Grounds, Limerick

2001 Rob Robin	Clare	0-3 - 0-12	Tipperary	Bruff

2001 Rob Robin	Limerick	0-9 - 1-5	Tipperary	Páirc Mhic Gearailt, Fermoy

2001 Rob Robin	Waterford	3-16 - 1-5	Clare	Cusack Park, Ennis

2001 Rob Robin	Waterford	2-8 - 2-8	Tipperary	Páirc Mhic Gearailt, Fermoy

2001 Rob Robin	Limerick	0-11 - 3-4	Clare	Cusack Park, Ennis

Play off

June 2001 Play-Off	Limerick	0-10 - 1-9	Tipperary	Páirc Mhic Gearailt, Fermoy

June 2001 Play-Off Final	Waterford	2-6 - 0-9	Tipperary	Páirc Mhic Gearailt, Fermoy

Semi-finals

June 2001 Semi-Final	Cork	7-13 - 1-7	Tipperary	Gaelic Grounds, Limerick

June 2001 Semi-Final	Kerry	7-13 - 1-7	Waterford

Final

15 July 2001 Final	Kerry	0-15 - 0-12	Cork	Páirc Uí Chaoimh, Cork

=== Ulster Minor Football Championship ===
Rob robin

2001 Rob Robin	Dongeal	2-5 - 0-8	Fermanagh	MacCumhaill Park, Ballybofey

2001 Rob Robin	Armagh	0-11 - 1-9	Tyrone	St Tiernach's Park, Clones

2001 Rob Robin	Cavan	4-13 - 0-8	Down	Casement Park, Belfast

2001 Rob Robin	Antrim	0-9 - 3-13	Derry	Celtic Park, Derry

2001 Rob Robin	Tyrone	1-7 - 2-15	Derry	St Tiernach's Park, Clones

Semi-final

June 2001 Semi-Final	Cavan	1-7 - 0-13	Monaghan	St Tiernach's Park, Clones

Final

8 July 2001 Final	Tyrone	2-13 - 0-13	Monaghan	St Tiernach's Park, Clones

=== All-Ireland Minor Football Championship ===
Semi-finals

26 August 2001 Semi-Final	Tyrone	0-11 - 0-8	Mayo	Croke Park, Dublin

2 September 2001 Semi-Final	Kerry	2-9 - 2-13	Dublin	Croke Park, Dublin

Final

23 September 2001 Final	Tyrone	0-15 - 1-12	Dublin	Croke Park, Dublin

29 September 2001 Final replay	Tyrone	2-11 - 0-06	Dublin	Croke Park, Dublin
