= 2003–04 All-Ireland Senior Club Football Championship =

Irish Football Championship

- Dates: 19 October 2003 – 17 March 2003
- Teams: 33
- Sponsor: Allied Irish Bank
- Champions: Caltra (1st title); Noel Meehan (captain); Frank Doherty (manager); Gabriel Naughton (manager)
- Runners-up: An Ghaeltacht; Darragh Ó Sé (captain); Tomás Ó Lúing (manager)

Tournament statistics
- Matches played: 34
- Goals scored: 60 (1.76 per match)
- Points scored: 566 (16.65 per match)
- Top scorer(s): Michael Meehan (4-19)

The 2003–04 All-Ireland Senior Club Football Championship was the 34th staging of the All-Ireland Senior Club Football Championship since its establishment by the Gaelic Athletic Association in 1970-71. The competition began on 19 October 2003 and ended on 17 March 2004.

The defending champion was Nemo Rangers; however, the club did not qualify after being beaten by Na Piarsaigh in the third round of the 2003 Cork County Championship.

On 17 March 2004, Caltra won the compeititoin following a 0–13 to 0–12 defeat of n Ghaeltacht in the All-Ireland final at Croke Park. It remains their only championship title.

Caltra's Michael Meehan was the competition's top scorer with 4–19.

== Team changes ==
The Waterford club champions did not contest the Munster Club Championship due to a delay in the completion of the Waterford County Championship.

== Connacht ==
=== Quarter-final ===
19 October 2003 Quarter-final	St Mary's Kiltoghert	0-08 - 1-06	Caltra	St Mary's Park
	G Bohan, N Commerton 0-3, J Goldrick 0-2.	Report	M Meehan 1-1, M Killalea 0-2, B Laffey, J Galvin, N Meehan 0-1.	Referee: H Beirne (Roscommon)

=== Semi-finals ===
2 November 2003 Semi-final	Curry	3-09 - 0-08	Ballina Stephenites	Markievicz Park
	A Marren 2-5 (3f); B McDonagh 1-2; D Colleary 0-2.	Report	P Harte 0-2f; P McGarry 0-2 (1f); G Brady, E Devenney, E Casey, L McHale 0-1 each.	Referee: G Kinneavey (Roscommon)

2 November 2003 Semi-final	Castlerea St Kevin's	1-07 - 1-13	Caltra	Dr Hyde Park
	G Heneghan 1-6, S Heneghan 0-1.		M Meehan 1-7, N Meehan 0-4, T Meehan 0-1, A Keighrey 0-1.

=== Final ===
30 November 2003 Final	Caltra	1-06 - 0-06	Curry	Pearse Stadium
	M Meehan 1-2 (0-2f), N Meehan 0-2 (0-1f), J Galvin, M Killilea 0-1 each.	Report	G Maye 0-4 (0-1 pen), S Davey, D Colleary (f) 0-1 each.	Referee: M Daly (Mayo)

== Leinster ==
=== First round ===
25 October 2003 First round	James Stephens	0-02 - 4-20	O'Hanrahans	John Locke Park
	R Manogue 0-1, E McCormack 0-1.		G Walker 1-5, B Walker 2-0, P Kavanagh 0-6, M Carpenter 1-1, D Bermingham 0-2, P Nolan 0-2, T Smith 0-1, K Walker 0-1, A Kavanagh 0-1, R Walker 0-1.

26 October 2003 First round	The Downs	0-08 - 3-08	St Patrick's	Cusack Park
	T Cleary 0-4, J Conroy 0-3, B Conroy 0-1.		D Connor 2-1, P Keenan 0-5, S White 1-0, J Holland 0-1, S Hynes 0-1.

26 October 2003 First round	Rathnew	0-14 - 1-09	Clara	Aughrim County Ground
	T Gill 0-9, T Doyle 0-2, J Stafford 0-1, N Mernagh 0-1, M Doyle 0-1.		T Deehan 0-6, T Dalton 1-0, M Mitchell 0-3.

27 October 2003 First round	Clonguish	2-05 - 0-06	Kilanerin	Pearse Park
	E Barden 2-1, P Barden 0-3, J O'Brien 0-1.		M Forde 0-4, J Hegarty 0-2.

=== Quarter-finals ===
8 November 2003 Quarter-final	St Patrick's	0-06 - 0-07	St Brigid's	Dundalk
	P Keennan 0-4, E Carroll 0-1, Ray Finnegan 0-1.		D Lally 0-2, Ray Gallagher 0-2, W Finnegan 0-1, J Noonan 0-1, K Darcy 0-1.

9 November 2003 Quarter-final	Clonguish	1-09 - 1-05	Blackhall Gaels	Pearse Park
	P Barden 1-3, P Dowd 0-2, C Clarke 0-2, J O'Brien 0-2.		B McKeon 1-0, M Ferris 0-3, T Brosnan 0-1, M Crampton 0-1.

9 November 2003 Quarter-final	Rathnew	0-05 - 1-05	Round Towers	Aughrim County Ground
	T Doyle 0-4, D Coffey 0-1.		P Donnolly 1-1, B Lacey 0-2, D Broughall 0-1, P Golden 0-1.

16 November 2003 Quarter-final	Arles/Kilcruise	1-09 - 1-08	O'Hanrahans	Dr. Cullen Park
	R Munnelly 0-5, K Kelay 1-0, C Conway 0-2, J McDonald 0-1, B Conway 0-1.		G Walker 1-0, B Walker 0-3, M Carpenter 0-3, D Walker 0-2.

=== Semi-finals ===
23 November 2004 Semi-final	Arles/Kilcruise	0-08 - 2-06	Round Towers	Dr Cullen Park
	R Munnelly 0-5 (2f), E Mooney, K Kealy, L Wall 0-1 each.	Report	L Donlon, G Ryan (pen) 1-0 each, L Ryan 0-2 (1f), K O'Dwyer, P Golden, P Donnelly, TJ Waters 0-1 each.	Referee: John Bannon (Longford)

23 November 2003 Semi-final	St Brigid's	2-11 - 3-06	Clonguish	Cusack Park
	Rory Gallagher 1-1, Raymie Gallagher 0-4 (1f), K Darcy 1-0, J Noonan 0-3 (2f, 1 '45'), K Bonner 0-2, D Lally 0-1.		P Barden 1-1 (1-0 pen, 1f), E Barden 1-4 (0-4f), D Barden 1-0, J O'Brien 0-1.	Referee: David Coldrick (Meath)

=== Final ===
7 December 2003 Final	St Brigid's	3-11 - 1-10	Round Towers	Páirc Tailteann
	D Darcy 2-1, M Galvin 1-1, Rory Gallagher 0-3, J Noonan 0-3, K Darcy 0-1, C Bonnar 0-1.	Report	D Broughall 1-0, P Golden 0-2, P Mullarkey 0-2, L Donlon 0-2, K O'Dwyer 0-2, B Lacey 0-1, L Ryan 0-1.

== Munster ==
=== Quarter-finals ===
Quarter-final	Castlehaven	w/o - scr.	Stradbally

2 November 2003 Quarter-final	St Senan's	1-08 - 2-04	Dromcollogher/Broadford	Páirc Uí Sheancháin
	M O'Shea 1-2, M Keane 0-3, Denis Russell 0-2, B Harte 0-1.		P Donnelly 1-1, T Stack 1-0, G Noonan 0-2, N Conway 0-1.	Referee: A Mangan (Kerry)

=== Semi-finals ===
9 November 2003 Semi-final	An Ghaeltacht	2-10 - 0-09	Castlehaven	FitzGerald Stadium
	A Mac Gearailt 1-1, R Mac Gearailt 1-0, T Ó Conchúir 0-3, T Ó Sé 0-2, D Ó Cinnéide 0-2, D Mac Gearailt 0-1, C Ó Cruadhlaoich 0-1.		C Crowley 0-6, P Hurley 0-2, F Cahalane 0-1.

16 November 2003 Semi-final	Cahir	0-10 - 0-14	St Senan's	The Park
	B Hickey 0-3 (1f); P Whelan 0-2 (1f); G Leahy, L Kiely, P Fraser, J McGrath, P O'Flaherty 0-1 each.	Report	M Keane 0-4 (2f); D Russell 0-3f; G Keane 0-2; D Russell, B Smith, M O'Shea, J Larkin, D De Loughery 0-1 each.	Referee: Michael Collins (Cork)

=== Final ===
30 November 2003 Final	An Ghaeltacht	1-08 - 1-06	St Senan's	Gaelic Grounds
	C Ó Cruadhlaoich 1-1, D Ó Cinnéide 0-2, T Ó Conchuir, C Ó Dubhda, T Ó Sé, A MacGearailt, R MacGearailt 0-1 each.	Report	Denis Russell 0-4, G Keane 1-0, M O'Shea, N O'Shea 0-1 each.	Referee: J Geaney (Cork)

== Ulster ==
=== Preliminary round ===
19 October 2003 Preliminary round	Four Masters	0-08 - 0-08	Castleblayney Faughs	MacCumhaill Park
	M Doherty 0-6, B Monaghan 0-2.		C Tavey 0-5, P Duffy 0-1, D McArdle 0-1, E Murphy 0-1.

26 October 2003 Preliminary round replay	Castleblayney Faughs	0-10 - 1-08	Four Masters	St Tiernach's Park
	D McArdle 0-6, R Treacy 0-1, P O'Connor 0-1, D Loughman 0-1, F Moore 0-1.		R O'Donnell 1-2, M Doherty 0-3, J Carr 0-2, M Monaghan 0-1.

=== Quarter-finals ===
26 October 2003 Quarter-final	St Gall's	0-13 - 2-05	Enniskillen Gaels	Casement Park
	S Burns 0-5, K Stewart 0-4, A Gallagher 0-2, C Gallagher 0-1, M McCrory 0-1.		K Rooney 1-0, C Swift 1-0, T Brewster 0-2, C Bradley 0-1, R Judge 0-1, R McCabe 0-1.

26 October 2003 Quarter-final	The Loup	0-10 - 1-06	Bryansford	Glen
	P McFlynn 0-4, S McFlynn 0-2, P Young 0-2, F Martin 0-2, Joe O'Kane 0-1.		G Morgan 1-0, S King 0-2, C Kearney 0-2, C Brannigan 0-1, Gerard McCrickard 0-1.

2 November 2003 Quarter-final	Crossmaglen Rangers	2-10 - 1-07	Killyclogher	Oliver Plunkett Park
	O McConville 2-7, M McNamee 0-2, A Kernan 0-1.		G Martin 1-1, C Carland 0-3, L Meenan 0-2, V Owens 0-1.

2 November 2003 Quarter-final	Cavan Gaels	0-09 - 0-09	Four Masters	Breffni Park
	M Lyng 0-5, T McCormack 0-2, C Collins 0-1, A Forde 0-1.		M Doherty 0-6, D McGinty 0-1, B Monaghan 0-1, C McNulty 0-1.

9 November 2003 Quarter-final replay	Four Masters	0-13 - 0-11	Cavan Gaels	MacCumhaill Park
	M Doherty 0-7, K Lacey 0-3, P Espey 0-2, B Monaghan 0-1.		C Nelligan 0-6, M Lyng 0-2, K Crotty 0-1, G Duffy 0-1, A Forde 0-1.

=== Semi-finals ===
9 November 2003 Semi-final	The Loup	0-10 - 0-08	Crossmaglen Rangers	St Tiernach's Park
	F Martin 0-3, J McBride 0-2, P McFlynn 0-2, B McVey 0-1, J O'Kane 0-1, R Rocks 0-1.		O McConville 0-6, A Kernan 0-1, A Cunningham 0-1.

23 November 2003 Semi-final	St Gall's	1-11 - 0-09	Four Masters	St. Tiernach's Park
	S Burns 1-1, C McGourty 0-3, K Stewart 0-3, D O'Hare 0-2, A Gallagher 0-1.		P Espey 0-5, K Lacey 0-1, J Carr 0-1, S Carr 0-1, M Doherty 0-1.

=== Final ===
30 November 2003 Final	The Loup	0-11 - 1-05	St Gall's	St Tiernach's Park
	S McFlynn 0-3, R Rocks 0-3, J McBride 0-2, B McVey 0-1, P McFlynn 0-1, G Mallon 0-1.		S Burns 1-0, K McGourty 0-2, K Stewart 0-2, D O'Hare 0-1.	Referee: Jimmy White (Donegal)

== Quarter-final ==
7 December 2002 Quarter-final	Tara	1-08 - 3-12	An Ghaeltacht	Emerald GAA Grounds
	P Hehir 0-4 (2f), J Lavery 1-0, S Lynch 0-2 (1f), R Higgins, C Byrne 0-1 each.	Report	D Ó Cinnéide 1-5 (0-3f), C Ó Cathasaigh 1-1, R Mac Gearailt 1-0, T Ó Conchcuir 0-2, D Ó Sé, A Mac Gearailt, C Ó Cruadhlaoich, C Ó Dubhda 0-1 each.	Referee: S McCormack (Meath)

== Semi-finals ==
22 February 2004 Semi-final	An Ghaeltacht	1-09 - 2-03	St Brigid's	Semple Stadium
	D O Cinneide 0-3 (2f), R Mac Gearailt 1-0, C O Cruadhlaoich 0-2, T O Se, B Breathnach, D O Se, P O Cuinn 0-1 each.	Report	Raymie Gallagher 0-3 (2f), K Bonar, D Lally 1-0 each.	Referee: Pat McEnaney (Monaghan)

22 February 2004 Semi-final	Caltra	2-09 - 0-09	The Loup	Páirc Seán Mac Diarmada
	N Meehan 1-5 (3f); M Meehan 1-3 (2f); S Hogan 0-1.	Report	R Rocks 0-3 (2f); P McFlynn 0-2 (1f); J McBride, F Martin, P Young, S McFlynn (f) 0-1 each.	Referee: E Murtagh (Longford)

== Final ==
17 March 2004 Final	Caltra	0-13 - 0-12	An Ghaeltacht	Croke Park
	M Meehan 0-6 (4f, 1 '45'), N Meehan 0-5 (2f), D Meehan, S Hogan 0-1 each.	Report	D O Cinneide 0-4 (3f), R MacGearailt, T O Conchuir 0-2 each, C O Cruadhlaoich, D O Se, A MacGearailt, R O Flatharta 0-1 each.	Referee: Michael Monahan (Kildare)

== Statistics ==
=== Top scorers ===
Overall

Rank	Player	County	Tally	Total	Matches	Average
1	Michael Meehan	Caltra	4-19	31	5	6.20
2	Michael Doherty	Four Masters	0-23	23	5	4.60
3	Noel Meehan	Caltra	1-17	20	5	4.00
4	Oisín McConville	Crossmaglen Rangers	2-13	19	2	9.50
4	Dara Ó Cinnéide	An Ghaeltacht	1-16	19	5	3.80
6	Enda Barden	Clonguish	3-05	14	2	7.00
7	Roibeard Mac Gearailt	An Ghaeltacht	3-03	12	5	2.40
7	Seán Burns	St Gall's	2-06	12	3	4.00
9	Adrian Marren	Caltra	2-05	11	2	5.50
9	Gavin Walker	O'Hanrahan's	2-05	11	2	5.50

In a single game

Rank	Player	County	Tally	Total	Opposition
1	Oisín McConville	Crossmaglen Rangers	2-07	13	Killyclogher
2	Adrian Marren	Curry	2-05	11	Ballina Stephenites
3	Michael Meehan	Caltra	1-07	10	Castlerea St Kevin's
4	Ger Heneghan	Castlerea St Kevin's	1-06	9	Caltra
4	Tommy Gill	Rathnew	0-09	9	Clara
6	Gavin Walker	O'Hanrahan's	1-05	8	James Stephens
6	Dara Ó Cinnéide	An Ghaeltacht	1-05	8	Tara
6	Noel Meehan	Caltra	1-05	8	The Loup
9	Damien Connor	St Patrick's (Louth)	2-01	7	The Downs
9	Enda Barden	Clonguish	2-01	7	Kilanerin
9	Declan Darcy	St Brigid's	2-01	7	Round Towers
9	Enda Barden	Clonguish	1-04	7	St Brigid's
9	Michael Doherty	Four Masters	0-07	7	Cavan Gaels

=== Miscellaneous ===
- Caltra won the Connacht Club Championship for the first time in their history.
- St Brigid's won the Leinster Club Championship for the first time in their history.
- An Ghaeltacht won the Munster Club Championship for the first time in their history.
- The Loup won the Ulster Club Championship for the first time in their history.
