= Seán Armstrong =

Galway Gaelic footballer (born 1986)

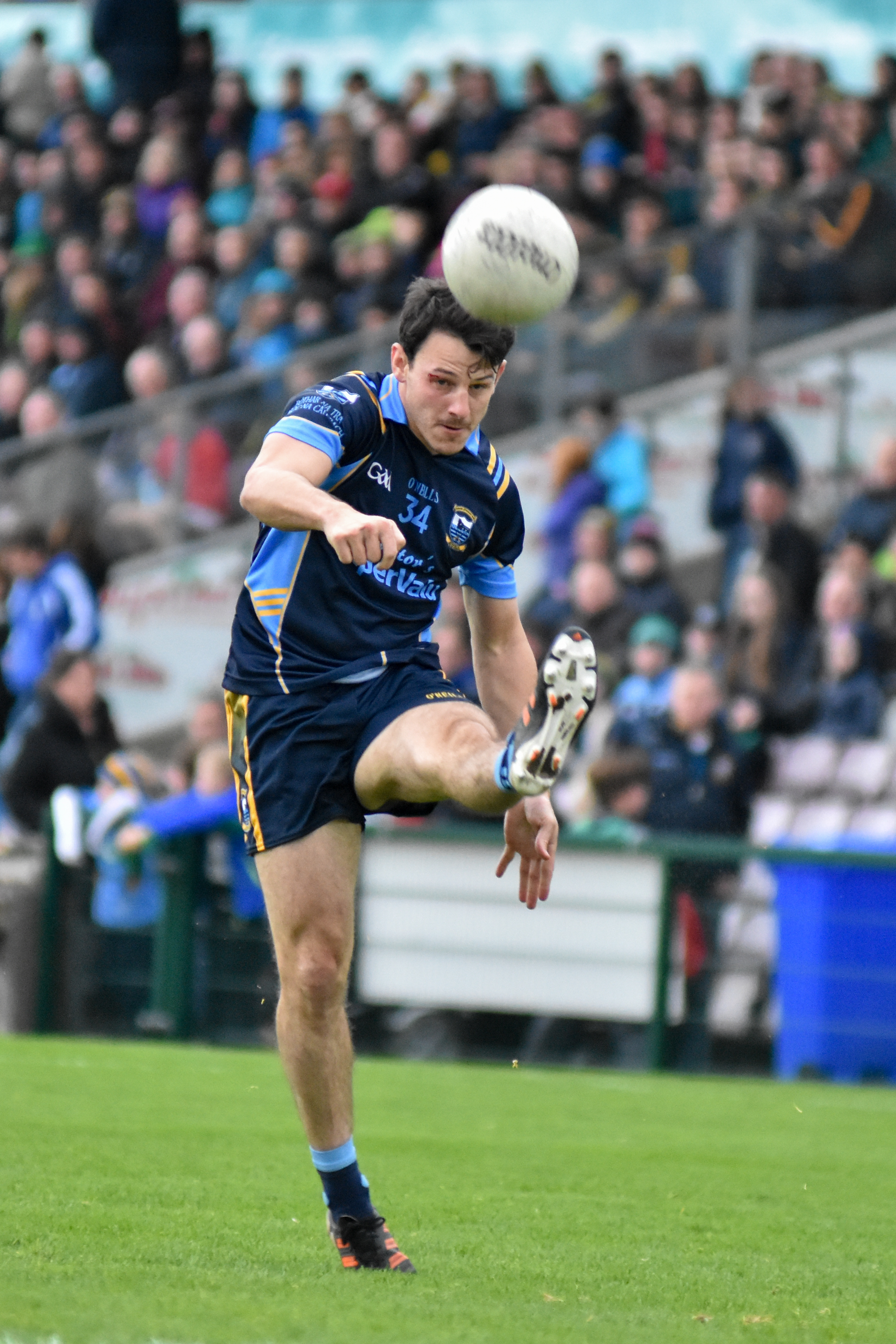
- Seán Armstrong in 2016

Personal information
- Native name: Seán Ó Labhradha Tréan (Irish)
- Born: 20 March 1986 (age 40) Galway, Ireland
- Occupation: Teacher
- Height: 1.81 m (5 ft 11 in)

Sport
- Sport: Gaelic football
- Position: Centre forward
Club
- Years: Club
- 2003–2021: Salthill–Knocknacarra
Club titles
- Galway titles: 2
- Connacht titles: 1
- All-Ireland Titles: 1
Inter-county
- Years: County
- 2005–2014; 2017–2018: Galway
Inter-county titles
- Connacht titles: 3
- NFL: 1

Seán Armstrong (born 20 March 1986) is an Irish former Gaelic footballer from Galway. Armstrong played his club football with Salthill–Knocknacarra and inter-county football for Galway from 2005 to 2014, spending ten years as an inter-county footballer.

== Career ==
Seán was a key part of Galway's Under 21 All-Ireland triumph of 2005. He formed a devastating partnership with Michael Meehan in the final as they scored 6-3 between them in a 6–5 to 4–6 victory over Down to claim the title.

Armstrong announced his retirement from the inter-county scene on 17 December 2014 at the age of 28 citing a loss of his love of the game. he is also a teacher in St Mary's College

== Honours ==
Salthill–Knocknacarra

- Galway Senior Football Championship (2): 2005, 2012
- Connacht Senior Club Football Championship (1): 2005
- All-Ireland Senior Club Football Championship (1): 2006

Galway

- Connacht Minor Football Championship (2): 2003, 2004
- Connacht Under-21 Football Championship (1): 2005
- All-Ireland Under-21 Football Championship (1): 2005
- Connacht Senior Football Championship (3): 2005, 2008, 2018

Connacht

- Railway Cup (1): 2014
