= Michael Meehan (Gaelic footballer) =

Gaelic football player

Personal information
- Native name: Mícheál Ó Míocháin (Irish)
- Born: 10 May 1984 (age 42) Ballinasloe, Ireland
- Occupation: Teacher

Sport
- Sport: Gaelic football
- Position: Full Forward
Club
- Years: Club
- 2001–: Caltra
Club titles
- Galway titles: 1
- Connacht titles: 1
- All-Ireland Titles: 1
College
- Years: College
- NUI Galway
College titles
- Sigerson titles: 1
Inter-county
Years	County	Apps (scores)
2003–2014, 2017	Galway	31 (12-84) SFC only
Inter-county titles
- Connacht titles: 3
- All-Irelands: 0
- NFL: 0
- All Stars: 0

Michael Meehan is a Gaelic footballer from County Galway. Meehan plays his club football with Caltra and played county football for the Galway senior football team. He announced his retirement from inter county football on 21 March 2014 due to injury.

== Career ==
=== College ===
Meehan attended St Jarlath's College in Tuam, playing in three consecutive Hogan Cups in 2000, 2001, and 2002. Although they lost the 2000 semi-final to St. Patrick's Navan and the 2001 final to the same opponents they were unstoppable in 2002 to claim their 12th title with a 3–13 to 0–06 victory against St. Michael's Enniskillen. He was an inspirational figure at full-forward, scoring 1–06. Future Galway teammates, Darren Mullahy, Gary Sice, Damien Dunleavy, Alan Burke and Niall Coleman were also on the team. James Kavanagh, a future Kildare senior, also played on the side. Michael captained the team in their victorious 2002 campaign.

He inspired NUI Galway to the 2003 Sigerson Cup, the first time the university had won that trophy since 1992.

=== Inter-county ===
Meehan won a Connacht MFC medal in 2002, and made his first inter-county Championship start in 2003, the Connacht Senior Football Championship 1st round clash against Roscommon. Since then, he has been a key part of the Galway set-up, having been consistently been picked by four different managers, John O'Mahony, Peter Forde, Liam Sammon and Joe Kernan. Michael has 3 Connacht medals to his name, coming in 2003, 2005 and 2008.

In 2004, Meehan was part of the Caltra team that enjoyed a memorable run to All-Ireland Club Championship glory. After coming through the Galway and Connacht club finals, which first time triumphs for the club, Caltra met An Ghaeltacht of Munster. In a close exciting encounter, Caltra prevailed by one point, 0–13 to 0–12. Michael was named Man Of The Match for his performance, scoring 6 points. His brothers, Declan, Tomás, Enda and Noel, who captained the team, were all starting players on the team.

For several years, Meehan was also a part of the Galway Under-21 set up. He was a key part of both of Galway's Under-21 All-Ireland triumphs in 2002 and 2005. He formed a devastating partnership with Seán Armstrong in 2005 as they scored 6–03 between them in Galways' 6–05 to 4–06 victory over Down.

In the 2008 Championship, Meehan won his third Connacht senior medal on 13 July as Galway defeated Mayo by 2–12 to 1–14 in MacHale Park. In their quarter-final clash against Kerry, Michael scored 10 points and seemed to be carrying the Galway side in the first half against the reigning All-Ireland champions. However, despite leading by 2 points early in the second-half, they could not capitalise on their advantage and Kerry won out in the end by 5 points. Michael finished the 2008 season with 0–22, one point short of his personal best.

Meehan was due to captain the Galway Senior Footballers for the 2010 Championship but sat out due to injury. 2011 proved to be difficult as Meehan continued to battled a troubled ankle injury that almost derailed his career. In 2012 he made a dramatic recovery, but did not return until the Connacht quarter Final as a sub against Roscommon. On 21 March 2014 he announced his retirement from inter-county football due to ongoing injury trouble.

== Personal life ==
Michael is the youngest of the Meehan brothers. Both Declan and Tomás have won All-Ireland medals for Galway, in 1998 and 2001. The passion of football in the Meehan family was clearly evident when 5 brothers started on the successful All-Ireland Club Championship Caltra side while eldest brother Seamus was a sub on that day. Michael's sister, Mairead, was a sporting star in her own right. She was a very useful camogie player. A teacher who graduated from DCU, she gained an All-Ireland junior camogie medal with Holy Rosary College. Mairead died in 2007 from osteosarcoma.

Meehan has participated in a marketing campaign for Ireland West Airport.

He teaches mathematics at St Jarlath's College, where he was educated, and helps manage the school team.
