= Salthill–Knocknacarra GAA =

Gaelic games club in County Galway, Ireland

Salthill–Knocknacarra
- Bóthar na Trá–Cnoc na Cathrach
- Founded: 1966
- County: Galway
- Nickname: The Sea Pirates
- Colours
- Grounds: The Prairie, Salthill
- Coordinates: 53°15′46.57″N 9°05′11.45″W

Playing kits
Standard colours

Senior Club Championships
	All Ireland	Connacht champions	Galway champions
Football:	1	2	4

Salthill–Knocknacarra (Irish: Bóthar na Trá–Cnoc na Cathrach) is a Gaelic games club based in the city of Galway in the west of Ireland. It is a member of the Galway GAA branch of the Gaelic Athletic Association. Centred on the parishes of Salthill and Knocknacarra in Galway city, the club fields teams in four codes: Gaelic football, hurling, Ladies' football and camogie.

== History ==
The club was founded in 1966 under the banner of Cumann Naomh Ciarán. In the 1980s, the club was in Galway football. It won over ten championships at both the minor and U-21 levels. Some underage club members have gone onto represent Galway at adult level. In 1990, the club won its first senior football county title, followed by a Connacht Club title. The club lost the All-Ireland Final in 1991 to Lavey of Derry. Players included Alan Mulholland (former Galway manager), Norman Costello, Cathal McGinley, John Kilraine, Pat Comer (producer of the video "A Year Til Sunday"), Mark Gibbs, and Donners, who subsequently managed the club to an All-Ireland title in 2006.

The club had their first winning Galway minor in 2002. In 2005, the club won its next county title, which was followed by an All-Ireland Club title on St Patrick's Day in 2006 against St Gall's of Antrim. Players included Finian Hanley, Seán Armstrong, Michael Donnellan, Alan Kerins, among others.

Salthill–Knocknacarra hosted the then Prince William, Duke of Cambridge and his Duchess, wife Catherine, in March 2020, the first visit by any members of the British royal family to a GAA club in Ireland (though previous visitors had toured Croke Park).

Hurling has been played in the club since the early 1980s. The hurlers play at Junior A level and include Gakway hurler Donal O'Shea, while the Junior F side contest the county final this year.

The senior team is managed by former Galway All-Star Finian Hanley. A number of Salthill–Knocknacarra players, including Robert Finnerty and John Maher, were involved in getting Galway to the 2024 All-Ireland Senior Football Championship final. In 2024, after that All-Ireland final appearance, Maher, the SKGAA’s senior Captain, was nominated for the PWC Player of the Year and won an All-Star, as did Finnerty.

The club has facilities including floodlit playing pitches, Astro turf and an events centre, Arus Bóthar na Tra. This facility is used for events including yoga, pliâtes, dance, art classes, and conference facilities.

In Ladies Gaelic football, the ladies won a Junior county title in 2003 and in 2022, with ladies then players playing for the Galway GAA Team on the inter-county lady stage. In 2023, the now-intermediate side, won the Galway Intermediate title and bowed up in the Connacht intermediate semi-final after additional time. In 2024, they won the Senior B and Junior C titles as well as Junior Coen Cup. The senior Camogie team won promotion as league champions to Division one and after a first … a replay and two periods of extra time lost out to Clarinbridge in the Senior B Championship final.

The club is structured at an underage level in all four codes, with parents involved in managing teams.

== Honours ==
=== Football ===
- All-Ireland Senior Club Football Championship (1): 2005/06
- All-Ireland Leadies Gealic Football Junior Champions (1): 2022
- Connacht Senior Club Football Championship (2): 1990, 2005
- Galway Senior Football Championship (4): 1990, 2005, 2012, 2026
- Galway Minor Football Championship (2): 2002, 2011

=== Hurling ===
- Galway Junior Hurling Championship (1): 2021
- Connacht Junior Club Hurling J1 Championship (1): 2021

== Notable players ==
Listed according to the sport (or other career) they are most notable for:

Matt Faughnan a noted hurler.

Football

- Seán Armstrong
- Gary Cox
- Michael Donnellan
- Niall Finnegan
- Robert Finnerty
- Finian Hanley
- Alan Kerins
- Paul McGettigan
- John Maher: 2024 All Star and nominee for Player of the Year
- Alan Mulholland
- Liam Sammon
- Maurice Sheridan
- Matthew Thompson

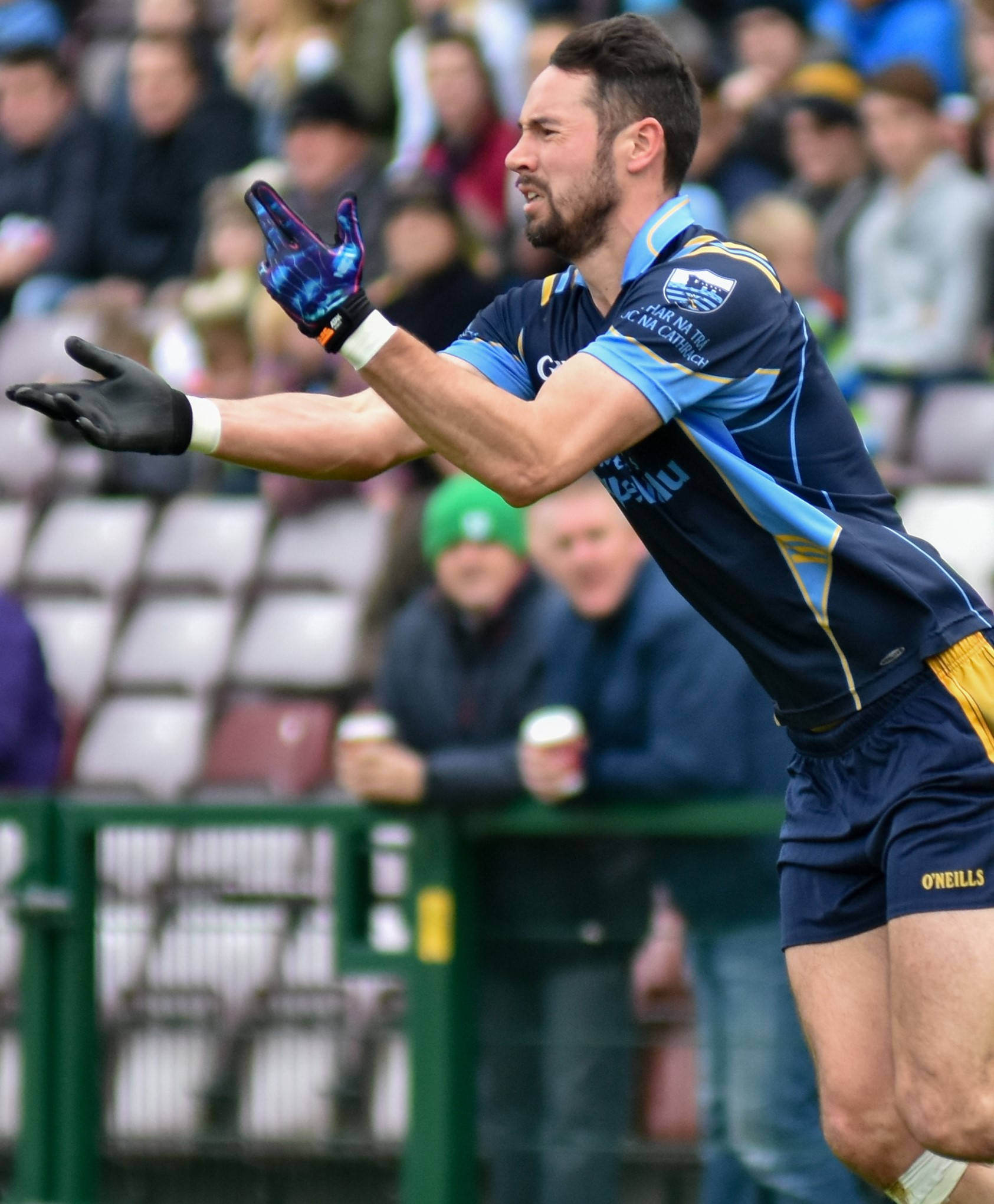
Footballer Finian Hanley in 2016

Hurling

- Aonghus Callanan
- Tadhg Haran
- Donal O'Shea
- David Tierney

Ladies football

- Kate Thompson

Other sports

- Gavin Duffy (Rugby)
- Dora Gorman (Ladies' Soccer)

== External sources ==
- Club website
- http://www.skgaa.ie/index.php?option=com_content&view=category&layout=blog&id=161&Itemid=129
