= GAA Minor Star Footballer of the Year =

- Country: (Republic of Ireland) Ireland
- Presented by: Gaelic Athletic Association
- First award: 2017
- Current holder: Johnny McGuckian
- Website: Official website

The GAA Minor Star Footballer of the Year is a gaelic football award presented annually by the sport's governing body, the Gaelic Athletic Association, to the player deemed the best in the All-Ireland Minor Championship. The award, created in 2017, is part of the wider GAA Minor Star Awards. The award is sponsored by Electric Ireland.

== Winners ==
Year	Player	County	Club
2017	David Clifford	Kerry	Fossa
2018	Paul Walsh	Kerry	Brosna
2019	Conor Corbett	Cork	Clyda Rovers
2020	Matthew Downey	Derry	Lavey
2021	Conor Ennis	Meath	Ballinabrackey
2022	Tomás Farthing	Galway	An Spidéal
2023	Johnny McGuckian	Derry	Watty Graham's, Glen
