= 2024 All-Ireland Minor Football Championship =

Gaelic football event

All-Ireland Minor Football Championship 2024
Championship details
- Dates: 27 March – 7 July 2024
- Teams: 31

All-Ireland Champions

Provincial Champions
- Munster: Kerry
- Leinster: Longford
- Ulster: Derry
- Connacht: Mayo

Championship statistics
- No. matches played: 33
- Goals total: 83
- Points total: 649
- Top Scorer: Kobe McDonald (4-30)

The 2024 All-Ireland Minor Football Championship was the 93rd staging of the All-Ireland Minor Football Championship since its establishment by the Gaelic Athletic Association in 1929. The championship ran from 27 March to 7 July 2024.

Derry are the defending champions.

== Format change ==
A vote at GAA Congress in September 2023 approved the introduction of tiered knockout competitions as part of the All-Ireland Minor Football Championship. Tier 1 features the four provincial champions playing the four provincial runners up in the All-Ireland quarter-finals. Those pairings are decided on a provincial rota system initially determined by Central Council and provincial finals cannot be repeated at the quarter-final stage.

The tier 2 knockout competition comprises 11 teams: one from Munster, four teams from both Leinster and Ulster and two from Connacht. Leinster and Ulster are each represented by their two losing semi-finalists as well as two beaten quarter-finalists. The third and fourth placed teams in Connacht are also included. The semi-finalists in Leinster and Ulster along with the third-placed team in Connacht receive byes to the quarter-finals where they are joined by three preliminary quarter-final winners.

In tier 3, there are 13 teams made up of five from Leinster, three from both Munster and Ulster and two from Connacht. In Connacht's case, their fifth-placed team play London for a place in the quarter-finals.

The tiered All-Ireland series runs over an eight-week period from mid-May to the start of July. New cups are to be commissioned for the tier 2 and 3 competitions.

== Connacht Minor Football Championship ==
=== Connacht group stage ===
==== Connacht group table ====
Pos	Team	Pld	W	D	L	SF	SA	Diff	Pts	Qualification
1	Mayo	4	4	0	0	70	37	33	8	Advance to final
2	Roscommon	4	3	0	1	61	49	12	6	Advance to semi-final
3	Galway	4	1	1	2	53	56	-3	3	Advance to semi-final
4	Sligo	4	1	1	2	39	48	-9	3	
5	Leitrim	4	0	0	4	37	70	-33	0	

==== Connacht group stage results ====
12 April 2024 Round 1	Mayo	2-13 - 2-07	Roscommon	Hastings MacHale Park
	K McDonald 1-5 (0-3f), A Quinn 1-0, E Walsh 0-3, O Deane, H McHale, C Moriarty, T Hession and J Forry 0-1 each.	Report	D Casey 1-1, E Collins 1-0, S Tighe 0-3 (2f), A Conroy 0-2 (1f), D Curran 0-1f.

12 April 2024 Round 1	Galway	0-11 - 2-05	Sligo	Tuam Stadium
	K Joyce 0-5, L Dempsey 0-2, C Killeen 0-2, E Ó Cualain 0-1, N de Paor 0-1.	Report	N Duffy 0-5, M Clifford 1-0, A Feeney 1-0.

19 April 2024 Round 2	Sligo	0-09 - 0-08	Leitrim	Markievicz Park
	N Duffy 0-6, 1M, 4f; M Walsh, M Clifford & A Healy (f) 0-1 each	Report	J Kelly 0-5, 1M, 3f; D McCabe 0-3, 2f

19 April 2024 Round 2	Roscommon	1-10 - 1-07	Galway	Dr Hyde Park
	A Conroy 1-0, S McGuinness, D Curran (1f) 0-2 each, C Murray, D Kennedy, D Casey (1f), S Tighe, C Enright, E Collins 0-1 each.	Report	D Kilraine 1-0, K Joyce 0-2f, M Leahy, N de Paor (1f), D Naughton, C Rafferty, S O’Callaghan 0-1 each

26 April 2024 Round 3	Galway	1-06 - 2-13	Mayo	Tuam Stadium
	C Killeen (1-1); K Joyce (0-3, 1f), R McGrath (0-1), N De Paor (0-1, 1f).	Report	H McHale (1-2), E Walsh (0-5, 1f), O Deane (1-0), K McDonald (0-3, 1f), C Moriarty (0-1, mark), D Hurley (0-1), D Flynn (0-1);

26 April 2024 Round 3	Leitrim	1-09 - 2-15	Roscommon	Páirc Sheáin Uí Eislin
	D McCabe 0-3; O Foley 1-0; J Kelly 0-2 (fs); S Bohan, B McBride, G Gallagher, K Russell 0-1 each.	Report	D Curran 1-5 (5f); C Enright 1-1; S Tighe, S McGuinness 0-2 each; C Murray, G Casey, E Collins, D Devaney & S McDonnell 0-1 each.

3 May 2024 Round 4	Mayo	3-08 - 0-04	Leitrim	Hastings MacHale Park
	K McDonald 1-3, 2f; O Deane 1-1, 1f; E Walsh 1-0; T Hession, J Moyles, F Ó Cinnseala & D Flynn 0-1 each.	Report	J Kelly 0-2, 1f; B McBride & D McCabe 0-1 each

3 May 2024 Round 4	Roscommon	2-08 - 0-08	Sligo	Dr Hyde Park
	D Casey (1-1, one free), S McDonnell (1-1), S Tighe (0-2), D Curran (0-2, one free), C Murray (0-1); C Mulry (0-1).	Report	N Duffy (0-5, four frees), C Gilligan (0-1), T Murphy (0-1), C Nicholson (0-1).

10 May 2024 Round 5	Sligo	0-11 - 1-12	Mayo	Markievicz Park
	N Duffy 0-5, A Healy 0-3, C McDonagh 0-2, N Phillips 0-1.	Report	K McDonald 1-4, E Walsh 0-2, O Deane 0-2, D Hurley 0-2, J Forry 0-1, J O'Malley 0-1.

10 May 2024 Round 5	Leitrim	1-10 - 2-17	Galway	Páirc Sheáin Uí Eislin
	J Kelly 1-7, D McCabe 0-2, S Bohan 0-1.		K Joyce 1-2, N de Paor 0-6, C Killeen 1-1, C O'Donnell 0-4, S O'Callaghan 0-2, J O'Sullivan 0-1, F Ó Braonáin 0-1.

=== Connacht semi-final ===
17 May 2024 Semi-final	Galway	0-07 - 3-05	Roscommon	Tuam Stadium
	K Joyce 0-5 (2f), N de Paor 0-2 (1f).	Report	D Curran 1-2 (1f), D Casey 1-1, E Collins 1-0, S Tighe and J McKeon 0-1 each.

=== Connacht final ===
24 May 2024 Final	Mayo	0-14 - 0-10	Roscommon	Dr Hyde Park
	K McDonald 0-6 (5f); O Deane 0-3; E Walsh 0-2 (1f) C Moriarty, A Quinn and J Forry 0-1 each.	Report	D Casey 0-4 (1f), D Curran 0-3 (2f), D Devaney, A Conroy and S Tighe 0-1 each.

== Leinster Minor Football Championship ==
=== Leinster group 1 ===
==== Leinster group 1 table ====
Pos	Team	Pld	W	D	L	SF	SA	Diff	Pts	Qualification
1	Longford (Note: Longford are ranked ahead of Dublin as they won the head-to-head game between the teams.)	3	2	0	1	45	39	6	4	Advance to semi-finals
2	Dublin	3	2	0	1	61	42	19	4	Advance to quarter-finals
3	Offaly (Note: Offaly are ranked ahead of Laois as they won the head-to-head game between the teams.)	3	1	0	2	37	50	-13	2	Advance to preliminary quarter-finals
4	Laois	3	1	0	2	39	51	-12	2	

==== Leinster group 1 results ====
27 March 2024 Round 1	Laois	1-11 - 5-13	Dublin	LOETB Laois Centre of Excellence
	U Dunne 0-5 (2f), J Finn 1-0, E Byrne, D Brennan 0-2 each, C O’Callaghan (f), C McElroy 0-1 apiece.	Report	S Bolger 2-2, R Doherty 0-6 (2f, 1m), F Lydon, D Magee 1-1 each, J Kennedy 1-0, C Loughran, R Ennis, K Costello 0-1 apiece.

27 March 2024 Round 1	Offaly	1-09 - 2-13	Longford	Faithful Fields
	C McNamee 0-5 (2f), S Hanniffy 1-0 (p), M Bryant 0-2 (1m and 1`f), L Moore and E Maher 0-1 each.	Report	C O'Donnell 1-4 (1f), J Hagan 1-3 1f), S Fagan, J Shannon, K O'Hara, B Blessington, K Hudson and L Greene 0-1 each.

3 April 2024 Round 2	Longford	3-08 - 1-09	Dublin	Bertie Allen Park
	C O’Donnell 0-6 (5f), J Marsh 1-1, O Kane, K O’Hara 1-0 each, J Shannon 0-1.	Report	D Magee 0-5 (3 ‘45’s, 1f), H O’Neill 1-0 (pen), J O’Keeffe, S Bolger, R Doherty (f), D McGill 0-1 apiece.

3 April 2024 Round 2	Laois	0-10 - 2-08	Offaly	Laois Hire O'Moore Park
	U Dunne 0-6 (2f and 1m), E Byrne 0-2, D Brennan and C O'Callaghan (f) 0-1 each.	Report	C McNamee 1-4 (2f), D Dunne 1-0, M Bryant 0-2, L Moore and S Hanniffy 0-1 each.

13 April 2024 Round 3	Dublin	2-15 - 2-05	Offaly	Parnell Park
	R Doherty 1-6 (0-3f), D Magee 1-4 (0-1 ‘45’), F McGinnis 0-2, E O’Donovan, J Kennedy, D McGill 0-1 apiece.	Report	C McNamee 2-2 (0-2f), M Bryant (f), E Cullen, Colm Egan 0-1 apiece.

13 April 2024 Round 3	Longford	1-06 - 0-15	Laois	Glennon Brothers Pearse Park
	J Hagan (1-0, penalty), C Doherty (0-2), K Hudson (0-1), J Marsh (0-1), C O’Donnell (0-1, free), S Fagan (0-1).	Report	E Byrne (0-4), U Dunne (0-3, 2 frees), D Brennan (0-2); R Bourke (0-2); C McElroy (0-2), C O’Callaghan (0-1), R Murphy (0-1).

=== Leinster group 2 ===
==== Leinster group 2 table ====
Pos	Team	Pld	W	D	L	SF	SA	Diff	Pts	Qualification
1	Kildare	3	3	0	0	48	27	21	6	Advance to semi-finals
2	Louth	3	2	0	1	32	34	-2	4	Advance to quarter-finals
3	Meath	3	1	0	2	37	44	-7	2	Advance to preliminary quarter-finals
4	Westmeath	3	0	0	3	33	45	-12	0	

==== Leinster group 2 results ====
27 March 2024 Round 1	Louth	1-10 - 0-11	Westmeath	Páirc Baile Fiach
	A O’Reilly 1-3 (2f, 1 mark), C McQuilan 0-3; L Keenan 0-2 (1f), E Duffy 0-1 (1f), B Cassidy 0-1.	Report	J McHugh 0-7 (3f), W Scahill 0-3 (1 mark), D Lough 0-1.

27 March 2024 Round 1	Meath	1-06 - 1-18	Kildare	Whyte Park
	P Crawley 0-4 (3fs), E Kelly 1-0, J Doyle 0-2.	Report	H Donnelly 0-6 (3fs), M O’Toole 1-1, R Lawlor 0-2, P Ryan 0-2, R Kelly 0-1, C McKevitt 0-1; E Boyle 0-1, A Donegan 0-1, B Caffrey 0-1, L Murray 0-1, T Donlon 0-1.

3 April 2024 Round 2	Westmeath	2-06 - 1-12	Kildare	Kinnegad Grounds
	W Scahill 1-1 (0-1 Mark), C Ormsby 1-0, J McHugh 0-4 (0-4 frees), D O'Brien 0-1 (0-1 frees).	Report	H Donnelly 0-4 (0-3 frees), P Ryan 1-1, R Lawlor 0-2, D O'Dwyer 0-1 (0-1 frees), L Murray 0-1, C McKevitt 0-1, B Caffrey 0-1, A Donegan 0-1.

3 April 2024 Round 2	Louth	1-10 - 0-11	Meath	Páirc Baile Fiach
	J Hanlon (0-4) (3f), B Cassidy (1-0), L Keenan (0-2) (1f), C McQuilan (0-2); D Skinnader (0-1), M O’Shaughnessy (0-1);.	Report	P Crawley (0-3) (2f), E Kelly (0-3), C Smith (0-2) (1f), C Nugent (0-1) (1f); P Yourell (0-1), A O’Brien (0-1).

13 April 2024 Round 3	Westmeath	1-07 - 2-11	Meath	TEG Cusack Park
	J McHugh 1-2, D Lough 0-2 (1f), M Weir, D O’Brien, W Scahill (f) 0-1 each.	Report	C Nugent 0-6 (3f), E Kelly 1-2, P Crawley 1-0, C Tobin, C Smith, C Barron 0-1 each.

13 April 2024 Round 3	Kildare	0-12 - 0-06	Louth	Hawkfield Centre of Excellence
	R Lawlor 0-3, B Caffrey 0-2, R Kelly 0-2 (0-1 frees), H Donnelly 0-1 (0-1 frees), L Murray 0-1, L Kenny 0-1, T Donlon 0-1, E Boyle 0-1.	Report	C McQuillan 0-2, L Keenan 0-1, M McGlew 0-1, T Devanny 0-1, C Clinton 0-1.

=== Leinster group 3 ===
==== Leinster group 3 table ====
Pos	Team	Pld	W	D	L	SF	SA	Diff	Pts	Qualification
1	Wicklow	2	2	0	0	29	16	13	4	Advance to preliminary quarter-finals
2	Wexford	2	1	0	1	35	26	9	2	Advance to preliminary quarter-finals
3	Carlow	2	0	0	2	25	47	-22	0	

==== Leinster group 3 results ====
27 March 2024 Round 1	Carlow	2-11 - 3-18	Wexford	SETU Carlow Main Pitch
	E Ryan (1-2), A Dowling (0-4, 2 frees), B Nolan (0-3, 1 free, 1 mark), D Byrne (0-1), J Keating (0-1)	Report	O Morris (0-10, 7 frees), T Funge (1-2, 0-1 free), A O’Neill (1-1), D Rossiter (1-0 pen.), S Fitzharris (0-1), F Kavanagh (0-1), D Forde (0-1), E Hughes (0-1), C Power (0-1).

3 April 2024 Round 2	Wexford	0-08 - 0-09	Wicklow	St Patrick's Park
	O Morris 0-3, T Funge 0-1, E Hughes 0-1, D Forde 0-1, J Gallagher 0-1, A Kelly 0-1.		P Small 0-3, T Tisdall 0-2, M Kinsella 0-2, J Jacob 0-2.

13 April 2024 Round 3	Wicklow	2-14 - 1-05	Carlow	Joule Park
	P Small (1-7, 1f); T Tisdall (0-5, 3f, 1m), P Keogh (1-0), M Kinsella (0-1), J Corrigan (0-1).	Report	A Dowling (0-4f), J Curran (1-0), B Nolan (0-1m).

=== Leinster preliminary quarter-finals ===
24 April 2024 Pre. quarter-final	Wicklow	3-09 - 1-07	Offaly	Echelon Park
	P Small 1-3 (1-0 pen, 1f), M Kinsella 1-1, J Corrigan 1-0, T Tisdell 0-2, M Keogh, C Doody and P Keogh 0-1 each.	Report	C McNamee 1-2 (2f), D Dunne (1f), S Wyer 0-2 each, S Horkan 0-1.

24 April 2024 Pre. quarter-final	Meath	0-14 - 3-07	Wexford	Ashbourne Grounds
	C Nugent 0-5 (3f), P Crawley, E Kelly, S Duffy, C Smith (1f) 0-2 each, A Ducie 0-1.	Report	T Funge 3-0, O Morris 0-5 (4f), A O’Neill, J Hughes 0-1 each.

=== Leinster quarter-finals ===
1 May 2024 Quarter-final	Dublin	5-11 - 0-09	Wexford	Parnell Park
	R Doherty 1-3 (0-1f); S Bolger, C McCabe 1-1 each; C Loughran, F Lydon 1-0 each; R Ennis, H O’Neill 0-2 each; J O’Keeffe, J Kennedy 0-1 apiece.	Report	O Morris 0-6 (5f); D Forde, J Hughes, I Noctor 0-1 apiece.

1 May 2024 Quarter-final	Louth	1-11 - 1-07	Wicklow	Páirc Baile Fiach
	C McQuillan 1-3.	Report	P Small 0-2.

=== Leinster semi-finals ===
7 May 2024 Semi-final	Longford	0-11 - 0-10	Louth	Glennon Brothers Pearse Park
	J Hagan (3f), C O’Donnell (3f) 0-5 each; C Doherty 0-1.	Report	C McQuillan (1f) 0-3; A O’Reilly 0-2; F Skinnader, M McGlew, C Clinton, T Maguire, L Keenan 0-1 each.

7 May 2024 Semi-final	Kildare	1-12 - 2-10	Dublin	Hawkfield Centre of Excellence
	D O'Dwyer (2fs), P Ryan 0-3 each; R Kelly 1-0; C McKevitt 0-2; L Kenny, L Murray, H Donnelly, A Donegan 0-1 each.	Report	S Bolger 1-2; S Devane 1-0; D Magee (f), R Doherty (2fs) 0-2 each; C Gavin, J Kennedy, R Ennis, H O'Neill 0-1 each.

=== Leinster final ===
20 May 2024 Final	Longford	0-15 - 1-10	Dublin	Glenisk O'Connor Park
	J Hagan 0-3 (0-2f), L Donnelly 0-3, K O’Hara 0-2, C O’Donnell 0-2, A Mimnagh 0-1, B Blessington 0-1, M Cooney 0-1f, C Flynn 0-1, L Greene 0-1.	Report	R Doherty 0-6 (0-5f), S Bolger 1-0, R Ennis 0-1, C Loughran 0-1, F Costello 0-1, C McCabe.

== Munster Minor Football Championship ==
=== Munster phase 1 ===
==== Munster phase 1 group table ====
Pos	Team	Pld	W	D	L	SF	SA	Diff	Pts	Qualification
1	Tipperary	3	3	0	0	52	30	22	6	Advance to phase 1 final
2	Clare	3	2	0	1	39	38	1	4	Advance to phase 1 final
3	Waterford	3	1	0	2	41	44	-3	2	
4	Limerick	3	0	0	3	32	52	-20	0	

==== Munster phase 1 group stage results ====
2 April 2024 Round 1	Clare	1-11 - 0-13	Waterford	Páirc Naomh Mhuire
	C Burke (1-8, 7f); S O’Connell (0-2); S Fennell (0-1f)	Report	J Brennan (0-6, 3f); P McCarthy (0-3, 2f); C Power, L Kavanagh, B Drohan, T Lynch (0-1 each)

2 April 2024 Round 1	Tipperary	2-13 - 0-10	Limerick	Fethard Town Park
	D Cotter (2-2); C Walsh (0-4, 1 mark, 1 free); T Corcoran, J Yousif (0-2 each); J Garrett (free), C Healy, C Kelly (0-1 each).	Report	S Dolan (0-5, 4 frees); D Dawson, C Costelloe, R Mullins, R McNamara, J Slattery (0-1 each).

9 April 2024 Round 2	Waterford	0-09 - 1-14	Tipperary	Páirc Naomh Bríd
	P McCarthy (2fs, 1 45), J Brennan (3fs) (0-3 each), L Hennessy (0-2), P Spellman (0-1).	Report	J Garrett (0-5, 2fs), A Coppinger (1-0), D Cotter, C Kelly, C Walsh (1f) (0-2 each), J Yousif, S Griffin, C Collins (0-1 each).

9 April 2024 Round 2	Limerick	0-09 - 3-06	Clare	Ballyagran Grounds
	S Dolan (0-3, 2f); C Costelloe (0-3); D Dawson, L Curtin (f), C Casey (0-1 each).	Report	S Fennell (2-3, 1pen, 1 ‘45’, 1f); C Burke (0-3); D Cahill (1-0).

16 April 2024 Round 3	Clare	1-08 - 2-10	Tipperary	Páirc Naomh Mhuire
	C Burke (0-4, 2f); K Hanley (1-1); L Clune (0-3, 2f ).	Report	P McDonagh (1-3); D Hogan (1-2); D Cotter (0-2); E Ryan, N O’Meara (f), B O’Donoghue (m) (0-1 each).	Referee: S Joy

16 April 2024 Round 3	Waterford	3-10 - 0-13	Limerick	Páirc Naomh Bríd
	P McCarthy (1-5, 1f), J Brennan (1-4, 2fs), D Nyhan (1-0), T Lynch (0-1).	Report	S Dolan (0-6, 3fs), R Mullins (0-3, 1m), C Costelloe, E O'Connor, S O'Dea, C Casey (0-1 each).	Referee: JM Fitzgerald

==== Munster phase 1 final ====
30 April 2024 Final	Tipperary	0-10 - 2-12	Clare	Mick Neville Park
	C Walsh 0-3 (3f), J Garrett (2f), P McDonagh and D Cotter 0-2 each, T Corcoran (1f) 0-1.	Report	C Burke 1-8 (4f), S O’Connell 1-0, S Fennell 0-3 (0-1 pen), D Cahill 0-1.

=== Munster quarter-final ===
30 April 2024 Quarter-final	Kerry	0-12 - 1-07	Cork	Austin Stack Park
	J McCarthy, G White, C MacGearailt 0-2 each, R Carroll 0-1f, R O’Connell, B Murphy, R Donovan, M Horan, J Joy 0-1 each.	Report	D Miskella 1-0 pen, S Whelton 0-3, 2f, D O’Neill 0-3, 2f, C McCarthy 0-1.

=== Munster semi-final ===
7 May 2024 Semi-final	Tipperary	2-05 - 2-19	Kerry	FBD Semple Stadium
	C Walsh (2-4, 0-3 frees, 0-1 mark); D Cotter (0-1).	Report	J Joy (1-3); G White (3 frees), J McCarthy (2 frees, 1 mark) (0-4 each); É Murphy (1-0); M Horan (0-3); B Murphy (0-2); K Dennehy, R Carroll (free), C Mac Gearailt (free) (0-1 each).

7 May 2024 Semi-final	Clare	0-08 - 1-13	Cork	Páirc Naomh Mhuire
	C Burke 0-5 (4f); S Fennell, S O’Connell, D Townsend 0-1 each	Report	D O’Neill 0-6 (1f); D Miskella 1-1; B Delaney (2f), S Whelton 0-2 each; B O’Shea, H Cogan 0-1 each

=== Munster final ===
13 May 2024 Final	Cork	1-06 - 2-18	Kerry	Páirc Uí Rinn
	D Miskella 1-3, S Whelton, D O’Neill (f), B O’Shea 0-1 each.	Report	G White 0-8 (0-2 f), R Carroll 1-5 (1-0 pen, 0-3 f), B Murphy 1-1, S Ó Cuinn, A Ó Beaglaoich, J Joy, M Horan 0-1 each.

== Ulster Minor Football Championship ==
=== Ulster group A ===
==== Ulster group A table ====
Pos	Team	Pld	W	D	L	SF	SA	Diff	Pts	Qualification
1	Donegal (Note: Donegal are ranked ahead of Tyrone as they won the head-to-head game between the teams.)	4	3	0	1	67	44	23	6	Advance to semi-finals
2	Tyrone	4	3	0	1	67	42	25	6	Advance to quarter-finals
3	Monaghan (Note: Monaghan are ranked ahead of Down as they won the head-to-head game between the teams.)	4	2	0	2	60	67	-7	4	Advance to quarter-finals
4	Down	4	2	0	2	67	48	19	4	
5	Fermanagh	4	0	0	4	25	85	-60	0	

==== Ulster group A fixtures and results ====
6 April 2024 Round 1	Fermanagh	1-04 - 3-13	Donegal	Brewster Park
	D Chapman 0-3m2f; T Cathcart 1-0; T O'Brien 0-1.	Report	C McCahill 1-5,2f; P Ward 2-1,0-1mark; D O Baoighill 0-3,1f; Turlough Carr 0-2; Tomas Carr (f), EB McNelis 0-1each.

6 April 2024 Round 1	Tyrone	2-07 - 1-07	Down	Cardinal MacRory Park
	D McAnespie, L McGeary 1-0 each, L McMurray 0-4 (1f), J Concannon, D McKeown, S McDermott (f) 0-1 each.	Report	L Blaney 1-0, P McGovern 0-4 (2f), B McEvoy 0-2 (2f), C Small 0-1.

13 April 2023 Round 2	Donegal	2-12 - 1-08	Tyrone	Fr Tierney Park
	C Ó Dochartaigh 2-2; C McCahill 0-2,1f; P Devine, L McGuinness, Turlough Carr (f), Tomás Carr (f), EB McNelis, M Campbell P Ward and D Ó Baoighill 0-1 each.	Report	L McMurray 1-2; L McGeary 0-2,1f; D McKeown 0-2,1’45’; J Concannon, P Colton 0-1 each.

13 April 2023 Round 2	Monaghan	4-10 - 0-08	Fermanagh	St Tiernach's Park
	K Kearns (2-01), C Rafferty (1-03, 1f 45’), S Hanratty (1-00), D Foy (0-03, 2f), E Treanor (0-02), C Mone (0-01).	Report	D Chapman (0-03, 3f), M Duffy (0-02, 45’), O McGovern (0-02), D O’Connor (0-01).

20 April 2024 Round 3	Monaghan	1-17 - 1-13	Down	St Tiernach's Park
	K Kearns 1-3, C Rafferty 0-6, E Treanor 0-2, D Foy 0-1, L Mone 0-1, L McKenna 0-1, S Hanratty 0-1, J McKenna 0-1, S Carolan 0-1.	Report	L Blaney 0-5, P McGovern 1-1, B McEvoy 0-3, D McLogan 0-1, D McKernan 0-1, D Carr 0-1, D Poland 0-1

20 April 2024 Round 3	Fermanagh	0-04 - 2-12	Tyrone	Belcoo Grounds
	D Chapman 0-2, T Cathcart 0-1, D O'Connor 0-1.		J Concannon 1-2, E Donaghy 1-0, S McDermott 0-3, L McMurray 0-2, L McGeary 0-2, D Devlin 0-1, D McAnespie 0-1, S Corry 0-1.

27 April 2024 Round 4	Down	3-09 - 1-06	Donegal	Páirc Esler
	D Poland 2-0, L Blaney 1-1, C Ward 0-3, B McEvoy 0-3 (2f), P McGovern and E McCaffrey 0-1 each	Report	C O’Dochairtaigh 1-0, Turlough Carr 0-3 (2f), K McLaughlin, C McCahill and A Cunnea 0-1 each

27 April 2024 Round 4	Tyrone	4-13 - 0-10	Monaghan	Michael Coney Park
	J Concannon 1-2, L McMurray 0-5, S McDermott 1-1, S Óg Teague 1-0, D McAnespie 1-0, L McGeary 0-2, P Colton 0-2, E Donaghy 0-1.	Report	C Rafferty 0-4, K Kearns 0-3, A Stuart 0-1, C Meehan 0-1, E Treanor 0-1.

4 May 2024 Round 5	Donegal	2-12 - 0-08	Monaghan	Fr Tierney Park
	C McCahill 0-4; T Carr 0-3,1f; D O Baoighill and E Gallagher 1-0 each; T Carr 0-2; C Mac Aoidh, P Devine, C Ó Gallachoir 0-1 each.	Report	K Kearns 0-2, f, m; E Treanor 0-2 each; C Rafferty, D Foy (f), T Nugent, L Mone 0-1 each.	Referee: M Loughran

4 May 2024 Round 5	Down	3-14 - 0-06	Fermanagh	Páirc Esler
		Report	D Chapman 0-3, D Mohan 0-2, C McInnes 0-1.	Referee: R Donoghue

=== Ulster group B ===
==== Ulster group B table ====
Pos	Team	Pld	W	D	L	SF	SA	Diff	Pts	Qualification
1	Derry	3	3	0	0	65	21	44	6	Advance to semi-finals
2	Armagh	3	2	0	1	39	38	1	4	Advance to quarter-finals
3	Cavan	3	1	0	2	38	38	0	2	Advance to quarter-finals
4	Antrim	3	0	0	3	18	63	-45	0	

==== Ulster group B fixtures and results ====
6 April 2024 Round 1	Armagh	2-09 - 0-02	Antrim	BOX-IT Athletic Grounds
	D O’Callaghan 1-1, S Loughran 0-4 (3f), C Agnew 1-0, D O’Rourke 0-2 (1f), S Woods 0-1, E Duffy 0-1.	Report	O Quinn 0-2.

6 April 2024 Round 1	Derry	1-08 - 1-05	Cavan	Owenbeg Centre of Excellence
	R Biggs (1-1), G Dillon (0-2), J Sargent, T McHugh, E Young, C Hargan and D Rocks 0-1 each.	Report	S McCabe (1-0), N Quigley (0-3, 3fs), O Madden (0-2)

20 April 2024 Round 2	Cavan	1-09 - 2-11	Armagh	Kingspan Breffni Park
	U O’Reilly (1-0), J Shehu (0-3, 2f), T Sheils (0-2), F Brady (0-1); N Quigley (0-1f), C Fallon (0-1).	Report	A Garvey (1-3), D O’Rourke (1-1), E Duffy (0-4), J McCooe (0-2), F Toale (0-1).

20 April 2024 Round 2	Antrim	1-02 - 2-24	Derry	Dunsilly Centre of Excellence
		Report	J Sargent 1-5, D Rocks 1-3, G Dillon 0-5, C Rocks 0-3, C Hargan 0-2, R Biggs 0-2, L Grant 0-1, C McCullagh 0-1, R Collins 0-1, E Young 0-1.

4 May 2024 Round 3	Derry	2-18 - 0-07	Armagh	Owenbeg Centre of Excellence
	G Dillon (1-5, 2f), E Young (1-3, 2f), J Sergeant (0-3, 1’45), R Biggs (0-2), D Rocks (0-2), C McBride (0-1), C McNally (0-1), L Grant (0-1).	Report	D O’Rourke 0-2 (1f), S Loughran 0-2 (1f, 1m), F O Tuathail (0-1), J Loughran 0-1, D O’Callaghan (0-1).	Referee: M Moore

4 May 2024 Round 3	Cavan	1-15 - 0-10	Antrim	Kingspan Breffni Park
	N Quigley (1-4, 2m, 1f), J Shehu (0-6, 3f), C Fallon (0-2), R Nwaneri (0-1), O Madden (0-1), O Maguire (0-1).	Report	JJ Higgins (0-3, 2f), J Logan (0-1), D Higgins (0-1), R McKeever (0-1), O Doherty (0-1f), L McLernon (0-1), J Óg McAuley (0-1), O Quinn (0-1).	Referee: O McKee

=== Ulster quarter-finals ===
11 May 2024 Quarter-final	Tyrone	1-14 - 0-15	Cavan	O'Neills Healy Park
	L McGeary 1-2, S McDermott 0-3, S Óg Teague 0-3, L McMurray 0-2, J Concannon 0-1, P McGoldrick 0-1, S Corry 0-1.	Report	J Shehu 0-6, N Quigley 0-3, T Shiels 0-3, C Fallon 0-1, O Maguire 0-1, R Nwaneri 0-1.	Referee: R Donoghue

11 May 2024 Quarter-final	Armagh	1-13 - 0-06	Monaghan	BOX-IT Athletic Grounds
	E Duffy 1-4, D O’Rourke 0-2, R Marsden 0-2, K McEntee 0-2, F Toale 0-1, S Woods 0-1, J McCooe 0-1.	Report	L McKenna 0-2, K Kearns 0-1 (1f), E Treanor 0-1, C Rafferty 0-1 (1f), O McConnon 0-1.	Referee: C Roberts

=== Ulster semi-finals ===
18 May 2024 Semi-final	Derry	2-14 - 1-10	Tyrone	Owenbeg Centre of Excellence
	C Hargan, D Rocks 1-2 each, E Young 0-4 (2f), G Dillon 0-3 (3f), C McBride, D McGuckin, C McNally 0-1 each.	Report	P Colton 1-3 (0-1f, 0-1m), S McDermott 0-2 (2f), L McMurray, D McKeown, S Corry, P McGinley, P McGoldrick (f) 0-1 each.

18 May 2024 Semi-final	Donegal	1-07 - 2-08	Armagh	MacCumhail Park
	C McCahill 0-3, 2fs; C Ó Dochairtaigh 1-0; D Boyle, E Gallagher, M Campbell, and A Cunnea 0-1 each.	Report	J McCooe and J Loughran 1-0 each; R Marsden, D O’Callaghan, and F Toale 0-2 each; K McEntee and T Fox 0-1 each.

=== Ulster final ===
28 May 2024 Final	Armagh	1-07 - 0-12	Derry	Athletic Grounds
	E Duffy 1-3 (3fs), A Garvey, K McEntee, S Woods, F Toale 0-1 each.	Report	E Young (1f), G Dillon (3fs) 0-5 each, J Sargent, L Grant 0-1 each.

== All-Ireland Minor Football Championship ==
=== All-Ireland quarter-finals ===
8 June 2024 Quarter-final	Kerry	3-18 - 2-03	Roscommon	Cusack Park
	R O’Driscoll (2-1), R Carroll (0-5, 2fs), G White (0-4, 3fs), J McCarthy (1-1), S O Cuinn, E Murphy (0-2 each), G O’Keeffe, J Joy, B Murphy (0-1 each).	Report	K Kelly, E Collins (1-0 each), D Casey (f), S Tighe, A Cox (0-1 each).

8 June 2024 Quarter-final	Mayo	3-14 - 0-06	Cork	Cusack Park
	K McDonald 1-6 (0-2 f, 1-0 pen), O Deane 2-3, M Sheerin 0-2, T Hession, D Flynn (m), D Hurley 0-1 each.	Report	S Whelton 0-3 (0-2 f), D Miskella, D O’Neill, O Harrington 0-1 each.

8 June 2024 Quarter-final	Longford	1-03 - 1-16	Armagh	Kingspan Breffni
	L Donnelly 1-1, J Hagan 0-2 (1f)	Report	D O’Rourke 0-6 (3f), S Loughra 1-2, C Wilson 0-3, F Toale 0-2, K McEntee, A Garvey, R Marsden all 0-1

8 June 2024 Quarter-final	Derry	0-18 - 2-10	Dublin	Kingspan Breffni
	E Young, J Sargent (1f), T McHugh (0-4 each), D Rocks 0-3, D McGuckin, R Biggs and L Grant 0-1 each	Report	D Magee 1-3, S Bolger 1-1, R Doherty 0-3 (3f) H O’Neill (f), R Ennis, K McGinnis 0-1 each

=== All-Ireland semi-finals ===
22 June 2024 Semi-final	Derry	1-13 - 1-12	Kerry	TEG Cusack Park
	J Sargent 0-4 (0-1 ’45, 0-2fs), E Young 0-4 (0-2fs), D Rocks 1-0, G Dillon 0-2 (0-1f), D McGuckin, L Grant, C Rocks 0-1 each.	Report	G White 0-5 (0-4fs), E O’Flaherty 1-1, M Horan, E Murphy, B Murphy, J Joy, J McCarthy(f), A Ó Beaglaoich 0-1 each.	Referee: A Coyne (Westmeath)

23 June 2024 Semi-final	Armagh	0-16 - 1-06	Mayo	Glennon Brothers Pearse Park
	E Duffy (1f, 1m) and S Loughran 0-4 each, D O’Rourke, D O’Callaghan and A Garvey 0-2 each, J McCooe and F Toale 0-1 each.	Report	A Quinn 1-0, K McDonald 0-3 (2fs), O Deane 0-2, J O’Malley 0-1.	Referee: J Hayes (Limerick)

=== All-Ireland final ===
7 July 2024 Final	Derry	2-07 - 0-10	Armagh	Healy Park
14:00 BST (UTC+1)	J Sargent 1-1 (1-0 pen), C Rocks 1-0, G Dillon 0-2 (1f), E Young 0-2, L Grant, D Rocks 0-1 each		D O'Rourke 0-3 (3f), M Finnegan 0-2(2 45s), G O'Rourke, R Marsden, Fionn Toale, A Garvey, E Duffy 0-1 each	Referee: B Tiernan (Dublin)

== Championship statistics ==
=== Top scorers ===
Overall

Rank	Player	County	Tally	Total	Matches	Average
1	Kobe McDonald	Mayo	4-30	42	7	6.00
2	Conor Burke	Clare	2-28	34	5	6.80
3	Rían Doherty	Dublin	2-27	33	7	4.71
4	Senan Bolger	Dublin	6-07	25	7	3.57
4	Cian McNamee	Offaly	4-13	25	4	6.25
4	Eamon Young	Derry	1-22	25	7	3.57
7	Oisín Deane	Mayo	4-12	24	7	3.42
7	Donach Magee	Dublin	3-15	24	6	4.00
7	Odhrán Morris	Wexford	0-24	24	4	6.00
10	Gearóid White	Kerry	0-23	23	5	4.60

Single game

Rank	Player	Club	Tally	Total	Opposition
1	Conor Burke	Clare	1-08	11	Tipperary
1	Conor Burke	Clare	1-08	11	Waterford
3	Charlie Walsh	Tipperary	2-04	10	Kerry
3	Jack Kelly	Leitrim	1-07	10	Galway
3	Patrick Small	Wicklow	1-07	10	Carlow
3	Odhrán Morris	Wexford	0-10	10	Carlow
7	Tom Funge	Wexford	3-00	9	Meath
7	Seán Fennell	Clare	2-03	9	Limerick
7	Oisín Deane	Mayo	1-06	9	Cork
7	Kobe McDonald	Mayo	1-06	9	Cork
7	Rían Doherty	Dublin	1-06	9	Offaly

=== Miscellaneous ===
- Longford beat Dublin in the Leinster Championship for the first time in 22 years.

== See also ==
- 2024 All-Ireland Minor Football Championship Tier 2
- 2024 All-Ireland Minor Football Championship Tier 3
