= 2023 All-Ireland Minor Football Championship =

Gaelic football event

All-Ireland Minor Football Championship 2023
Championship details
- Dates: 5 April – 9 July 2023
- Teams: 31

All-Ireland Champions
- Winning team: Derry (6th win)
- Captain: Fionn McEldowney
- Manager: Damian McErlean

All-Ireland Finalists
- Losing team: Monaghan
- Captain: Matthew Carolan
- Manager: Dermot Malone

Provincial Champions
- Munster: Kerry
- Leinster: Dublin
- Ulster: Derry
- Connacht: Mayo

Championship statistics
- No. matches played: 76
- Goals total: 199 (2.61 per game)
- Points total: 1637 (21.53 per game)
- Top Scorer: Max McGinnity (3-46)

The 2023 All-Ireland Minor Football Championship was the 92nd staging of the All-Ireland Minor Football Championship since its establishment by the Gaelic Athletic Association in 1929. The championship ran from 5 April to 9 July 2023.

Galway entered the championship as the defending champions, however, they were beaten by Derry in the All-Ireland quarter-final.

The All-Ireland final, the first to feature two Ulster teams, was played on 9 July 2023 at the Athletic Grounds in Armagh, between Monaghan and Derry, in what was their first ever meeting in an All-Ireland final but their third meeting in that year's championship. Derry won the match by 1-13 to 0-09 to claim their sixth All-Ireland title overall and a first title in three years.

Derry's Max McGinnity was the championship's top scorer with 3-46.

== Connacht Minor Football Championship ==
=== Group Stage ===
Pos	Team	Pld	W	D	L	SF	SA	Diff	Pts	Qualification
1	Galway	4	4	0	0	67	50	17	8	Advance to final
2	Mayo	4	2	1	1	71	56	15	5	Advance to semi-finals
3	Roscommon	4	2	0	2	52	43	9	4	Advance to semi-finals
4	Sligo	4	0	2	2	43	56	−13	2	Advance to shield final
5	Leitrim	4	0	1	3	55	75	−20	1	Advance to shield final

==== Connacht group stage fixtures ====
14 April 2023 Round 1	Roscommon	0-11 - 2-17	Mayo	Dr. Hyde Park
	S McDonnell (0-3, 1f); E Murray (0-3, 2fs), J Curran (0-2), R Henry (0-1), J Betts (0-1), J McGuinness (0-1).	Report	G Forry (2-0), D Beirne (0-5, 3fs), T Lydon (0-5, 2fs), D Neary (0-3), C Lynch (0-2), S Guilfoyle (0-1); C Ryder (0-1).

14 April 2023 Round 1	Sligo	1-09 - 1-13	Galway	Markievicz Park
	C Carty 0-7, A Long 1-0, M Carroll 0-1, C Gallagher 0-1.	Report	J Heneghan 1-4, D Fitzmaurice 1-0, C Mulhern 0-3, S Walsh 0-2, C Cox 0-2, S McGlinchey 0-1, S O'Grady 0-1.

21 April 2023 Round 2	Leitrim	1-08 - 0-11	Sligo	Avant Money Páirc Seán MacDiarmada
	P Honeyman 1-3, 1M, 1f; R O’Rourke, D Greenan, J Gilheaney, B Keaney & D Liu Doyle 0-1 each	Report	C Carty 0-3, 1f; E O’Mahony, J Molloy, A Lang 0-2 each; C Walsh & M Carroll 0-1 each

21 April 2023 Round 2	Galway	1-13 - 0-08	Roscommon	Tuam Stadium
	C Cox 0-5, S Walsh 1-1, C Mulhern 0-4, C McDonagh 0-2, D Fitzmaurice 0-1.		N Heneghan 0-4, S Tighe 0-1, S McDonnell 0-1, J McGuinness 0-1, E Murray 0-1.

28 April 2023 Round 3	Mayo	1-11 - 1-12	Galway	Hastings MacHale Park
	D Beirne 1-3, T Lydon 0-5, C Lynch 0-1, G Forry 0-1, R Mortimer 0-1.		J Heneghan 1-1, C Cox 0-3, C McDonagh 0-2, C Mu;hern 0-2, S Rhattigan 0-1, S McGlinchey 0-1, D Fitzmaurice 0-1, M Mulryan 0-1.

28 April 2023 Round 3	Roscommon	5-09 - 0-12	Leitrim	Dr. Hyde Park
	N Heneghan 3-4, R Kilcine 2-0, J Curran 0-2, J McGuinness 0-2, L Taylor 0-1.		Honeyman 0-9, A Gethins 0-1, J Maye 0-1, J Gilheaney 0-1.

5 May 2023 Round 4	Sligo	0-08 - 0-17	Roscommon	Markievicz Park
	C Carty 0-2 (2f), M Carroll (1f), D Higgins, J Molloy, C Gallagher, A Lang, D Moyston 0-1 each.	Report	S McDonnell 0-6 (5f), J McGuinness 0-3, N Heneghan, J Curran, E Murray 0-2 each, J Betts, C McKeon 0-1 each.	Referee: J Glavey (Mayo)

5 May 2023 Round 4	Leitrim	1-13 - 1-17	Mayo	Avant Money Páirc Seán MacDiarmada
	P Honeyman 1–6 4f; J Maye & R O'Rourke 0–2 each, J Gilheaney, S Carolan-Morris '45', B McBride 0–1 each;	Report	C Lynch 1–4; D Beirne f & T Lydon f 0–3 each; J Carey & J Lavelle 0–2 2f; J Clarke, S Guilfoyle & T Tuffy 0–1 each.	Referee: B Healy (Sligo)

12 May 2023 Round 5	Galway	4-08 - 1-13	Leitrim	Tuam Stadium
	M Mulryan and C Cox (1f) 1-1 each, R Coen and S Walsh 1-0 each, C Mulhern 0-3 (1f), B O’Malley, O Kelly and J Heneghan 0-1 each.	Report	P Honeyman 1-6 (5f), S Carolan-Morris 0-3 (2f, 1 ’45), J Kelly 0-2, R O’Rourke and S Bohan 0-1 each.

12 May 2023 Round 5	Mayo	1-11 - 1-11	Sligo	Hastings MacHale Park
	M Leonard 1-0, F Burke 0-2, T Tuffy 0-2, D Neary 0-2 (1f), M Leonard 0-1, R Gibbons 0-1, T Egan, 0-1, C Ginnelly 0-1, D Beirne 0-1.	Report	A Lang 0-4f, E O’Mahony 1-0, D Mostyn 0-3 (2f), C McDonagh 0-1, E Tuffy 0-1, J Molloy 0-1, C McDonagh 0-1.

=== Connacht shield final ===
19 May 2023 Shield final	Sligo	3-14 - 0-12	Leitrim	Markievicz Park
	P Honeyman 0-6, 2f; J Kelly 0-2; S Carolan Morris (f), K Russell, J Gilheaney & B McBride 0-1 each	Report	A Lang 0-5, 2f, 1M; E O’Mahony 1-1, 1f; C McDonagh 0-3; C Walsh & C Duggan 1-0 each; E Keane, J McHugh, L Higgins, J Molloy & M Carroll 0-1 each

=== Connacht semi-finals ===
19 May 2023 Semi-final	Mayo	2-13 - 2-12	Roscommon	Hastings McHale Park
	T Lydon 0-7 (0-4f), J Carey 1-3, D Beirne 1-1, C Lynch 0-1, G Forry 0-1.	Report	S McDonnell 0-6 (0-4f), E Carthy 1-1, R Kilcline 1-1, J Curran 0-1, J Betts 0-1, R Hanley 0-1, L Naughten 0-1

=== Connacht final ===
26 May 2023 Final	Galway	1-10 - 2-13	Mayo	Tuam Stadium
	C Cox 0-3 (0-2f), F Ó Conghaile 1-0, S McGlinchey 0-2, R Coen 0-1, O Kelly 0-1, C Mulhern 0-1f, C McDonagh 0-1, D Fitzmaurice 0-1.	Report	T Lydon 1-3 (1-0 pen, 0-3f), D Beirne 0-5 (0-2f), T Tuffy 1-0, T Egan 0-1, R Mortimer 0-1, F O’Reilly 0-1, S Guilfoyle 0-1, G Forry 0-1.

== Leinster Minor Football Championship ==
=== Group 1 ===
Pos	Team	Pld	W	D	L	SF	SA	Diff	Pts	Qualification
1	Kildare	3	3	0	0	54	30	24	6	Advance to semi-finals
2	Offaly	3	2	0	1	47	46	11	4	Advance to quarter-finals
3	Laois	3	1	0	1	37	39	−2	2	Advance to preliminary quarter-finals
4	Longford	3	0	0	3	21	44	−23	0	

=== Leinster group 1 fixtures ===
5 April 2023 Round 1	Kildare	3-15 - 2-11	Offaly	Hawkfield COE
	J Cunningham 0-9 (4fs), J McCabe 1-1, T Donlon 1-0, C Keaveny 1-0, H Redmond 0-2, E Donnelly 0-1, C Moore 0-1f, L O’Connor 0-1.	Report	C Bourke 2-0, F Carney 0-4fs, R Carney 0-2 (1f), K Bryan 0-1, R Grehan 0-1, R Carroll 0-1, C McKeon 0-1, C Weldon 0-1m	Referee: S Fagan (Wicklow), replaced by S Murphy (Louth) after 37 mins

5 April 2023 Round 1	Laois	2-12 - 1-02	Longford	Laois Hire O'Moore Park
	E Byrne (0-4, 2 frees), J Salvador (1-0), D Donohue (1-0), E English (0-3), E Johnston (0-3, 2 frees), R Murphy (0-1), T O'Connell (0-1).	Report	P Mollahan (1-0), C Flynn (0-2, 1 free).

12 April 2023 Round 2	Longford	0-03 - 1-09	Kildare	Glennon Brothers Pearse Park
	J Hagan 0-1, K Baskett 0-1f, P Mollahan 0-1f.	Report	J Cunningham 0-5 (0-2f), J McCabe 1-1 (0-1f), H Redmond 0-2, B Ryan 0-1. Longford:	Referee: N Ward (Westmeath)

12 April 2023 Round 2	Offaly	2-10 - 0-09	Laois	Glenisk O'Connor Park
	F Carney 1-2 (1f), R Carney 1-1, C Foran and C Bracken 0-2 each, C McKeon, B Carroll, K Bryan 0-1 each.	Report	E Byrne 0-3 (1m and 1f), E Johnson 0-2 (1f), D Donohue, D Brennan (f), F McEvoy and C Hogg 0-1 each.	Referee: U McElroy (Louth)

26 April 2023 Round 3	Laois	0-10 - 0-18	Kildare	Laois Hire O'Moore Park
	E Byrne 0-3 (one free), D Brennan 0-3 (two frees), E Johnson 0-2 (both frees), J Brennan 0-1, J Dunne 0-1.	Report	J Cunningham 0-5 (three frees), C Moore 0-3 (two frees, one 45), H Redmond 0-2, T Dalton 0-2, J McCabe 0-2, B Ryan 0-2, E Boyle 0-1, R Murray 0-1.

27 April 2023 Round 3	Offaly	1-11 - 1-10	Longford	Glenisk O'Connor Park
	F Carney (3f) and K Bryan 0-4 each, R Carney 1-0, M Mulrooney, B Carroll and C Bracken 0-1 each.	Report	K Baskett 0-4 (2f), S Donoghue 0-3, D Carey, P Molahan (f) and L Donnelly 0-1 each. (Goal was an own score by P Kenna)

=== Group 2 ===
Pos	Team	Pld	W	D	L	SF	SA	Diff	Pts	Qualification
1	Dublin	3	3	0	0	64	43	21	6	Advance to semi-finals
2	Meath	3	2	0	1	42	35	7	4	Advance to quarter-finals
3	Louth	3	1	0	2	42	40	2	2	Advance to preliminary quarter-finals
4	Westmeath	3	0	0	3	36	66	−30	0	

=== Leinster group 2 fixtures ===
5 April 2023 Round 1	Dublin	1-15 - 1-10	Louth	Parnell Park
	L Cahill 0-7 (2f), N Byrne 1-0, H Curley 0-3, S Ryan, L O’Boyle, P Coleman, J Young and A Carolan 0-1 each.	Report	A Gillespie 0-8 (5f), S Lennon 1-0, C McKeown and D Shevlin 0-1 each.	Referee: K Olwell (Meath)

5 April 2023 Round 1	Westmeath	0-10 - 2-10	Meath	Kinnegad Grounds
	S Cully 0-4 (2f), J Mitchell 0-2 (1m), A Curran, C Geary, D O'Connor, K Connell 0-1 each.	Report	B Corkery 2-1, C Commons, J Harkin (2f) 0-3 each, D Donnelly, P Crawley (m), B Smyth (f) 0-1 each.	Referee: K Williamson (Offaly)

12 April 2023 Round 2	Louth	2-13 - 0-07	Westmeath	DEFY Páirc Mhuire
	A Gillespie 1-5 (3f), P Grimes Murphy 1-1, L Brannigan, Conor McGinty 0-2 each, C McKeown, R Shevlin and S Flynn 0-1 each.	Report	J Mitchell, K Connell (1f) 0-2 each, P Keegan (f), R Kelly and D O’Connor 0-1 each.

12 April 2023 Round 2	Meath	0-11 - 2-09	Dublin	Páirc Tailteann
	P Crawley, J Harkin (2f), A Gormley (1f), P Crawley 0-2 each, B Corkery, C Commons, D Donnelly 0-1 each.	Report	P Curry, N Byrne 1-1 each, L Cahill (1f), J Young, S Ryan 0-2 each, H Curley 0-1.	Referee: E Kelly (Westmeath)

26 April 2023 Round 3	Louth	1-07 - 2-09	Meath	DEFY Páirc Mhuire
	A Gillespie 1-6 (0-4f), M Reid 0-1.	Report	J Harkin 0-6 (4f), B Corkery 1-0 (1p), L Jennings 1-0, C Commons 0-1, O O'Neill 0-1; O Yore 0-1.

26 April 2023 Round 3	Dublin	4-19 - 2-13	Westmeath	Parnell Park
	L Cahill 2-10 (0-8f), P Curry 2-0, S Ryan 0-5, A Rock 0-2, N Byrne, B Kennedy 0-1 each.	Report	D O’Connor 1-3 (1-0 pen, 0-1 ‘45’), K Connell 1-2 (1-0 mark), S Cully 0-3 (1f), P Keegan 0-2 (1f), C Geary, M Thornton 0-1 each.

=== Group 3 ===
Pos	Team	Pld	W	D	L	SF	SA	Diff	Pts	Qualification
1	Wicklow	2	2	0	0	33	22	11	4	Advance to preliminary quarter-finals
2	Wexford	2	1	0	1	20	20	0	2	Advance to preliminary quarter-finals
3	Carlow	2	0	0	1	22	33	−11	0	

=== Leinster group 3 fixtures ===
5 April 2023 Round 1	Wexford	1-10 - 1-07	Carlow	Chadwicks Wexford Park
	D Rossiter 1-1; H Murphy 0-3fs; D Dee, T Funge, D Shannon, S Reddy, B Stanley, R Gilbert (1m) 0-1 each.	Report	J Coakley 0-4fs; A Ryan 1-0; C Crawford, F O’Toole, E Myers 0-1 each.	Referee: R Roche (Wicklow)

12 April 2023 Round 2	Wicklow	0-10 - 0-07	Wexford	Echelon Park Aughrim
	E Cullen 0-5 (2f), E Nolan 0-2, M Kinsella, P Small and J Heatly 0-1 each.	Report	S Reddy 0-3 D Harris 0-2, D Dee and R Gilbert 0-1 each.

26 April 2023 Round 3	Carlow	2-06 - 3-11	Wicklow	Netwatch Cullen Park
	J Coakley 1-3 (2fs), B Doyle 1-1, A Dowling, J Nolan 0-1 each.	Report	P Small 1-2 (1f), E Cullen 0-4, T Kelly, C Broderick 1-0 each, M Kinsella, E Nolan, O Murphy, C Graham, J Heatley 0-1 each.

=== Leinster preliminary quarter-finals ===
3 May 2023 Prelim. quarter-final	Wicklow	0-10 - 0-12	Louth	Aughrim County Ground
	E Cullen 0-3 (3f), P Small (1f), J Healy and M Kinsella 0-2 each; J Heatly 0-1.	Report	A Gillespie 0-5 (2f), J Taaffe, D Shevlin and T McDonnell (1m) 0-2 each, P Tinnelly 0-1.	Referee: K Harris (Kildare)

3 May 2023 Prelim. quarter-final	Wexford	6-10 - 0-09	Laois	Chadwicks Wexford Park
	R Gilbert 3-2 (one mark), T Funge 1-0, C Kehoe 1-0, C Ivers 1-0, H Murphy 0-2 (two frees), D Rossitter 0-2, M Kavanagh 0-1, D Dee 0-1, S Reddy 0-1, D Gethings 0-1 (one free)	Report	E Johnson 0-4 (two frees), E Byrne 0-2, D Brennan 0-1, J Brennan 0-1, C Kearney 0-1	Referee: J Foley (Wicklow)

=== Leinster quarter-finals ===
16 May 2023 Quarter-final	Wexford	1-11 - 3-14	Meath	Chadwicks Wexford Park
	H Murphy (0-7 five frees), R Gilbert (1-2, one free, one mark), S Reddy (0-1), M Kavanagh (0-1).	Report	C Commons (1-4), A Gormley (0-6 three frees), C Liggan (1-0), M McIvor (1-0); D Donnelly (0-1); E Armstrong (0-1), B Smyth (0-1), B Corkery (0-1).

16 May 2023 Quarter-final	Offaly	2-11 - 1-13	Louth	Glenisk O'Connor Park
	C Bracken 1-2, K Bryan 1-1, F Carney (1f) and C Foran 0-3 each, C Bourke and M Mulrooney 0-1 each.	Report	A Gillespie 0-6 (4f), P Grimes-Murphy 1-2, L Buckley 0-2, M Reid, K Martin and C MacCriosta 0-1 each.

=== Leinster semi-finals ===
24 May 2023 Semi-final	Kildare	0-13 - 0-12	Meath	Hawkfield COE
	J Cunningham 0-4 (2 frees, 1 Mark), C Moore 0-3 (2 frees,1 '45), H Redmond 0-2, E Donnelly 0-2, S Murphy 0-1, D Kinch 0-1.	Report	C Commons 0-5, J Harkin 0-3 (2 free), O Maloney 0-1, A Gormley 0-1 (1 free), P Crawley 0-1, B Corkery 0-1.

24 May 2023 Semi-final	Offaly	1-08 - 6-15	Dublin	Glenisk O'Connor Park
	C Bracken 1-0, R Carney (1f), B Carroll 0-2 each, F Carney (1f), C Egan, A Molloy, N Flannery 0-1 each.	Report	H Curley 2-1, P Curry 2-0, L Cahill 0-6 (2f), N Byrne, L O’Boyle 1-0 each, S Mullarkey 0-3, S Ryan 0-2, J Young, C McAweeney, A O’Reilly (’45) 0-1 each.

=== Leinster final ===
31 May 2003 Final	Dublin	0-19 - 2-08	Kildare	Laois Hire O'Moore Park
	L Cahill 0-7 (4 frees), N Byrne 0-3, S Mullarkey 0-2, L O'Boyle 0-1 (1 45), S Ryan, A Carolan, S Keogh, J Young, H Curley, R Mitchell 0-1 each.	Report	T Donlan 1-1, E Boyle 1-0, C Moore 0-2 (2 f), E Donnelly, J Cunningham 0-2 each, H Redmond 0-1.	Referee: A Smith (Meath)

== Munster Minor Football Championship ==
=== Phase 1 Group Stage ===
Pos	Team	Pld	W	D	L	SF	SA	Diff	Pts	Qualification
1	Tipperary	3	3	0	0	53	21	32	6	Advance to phase 1 final
2	Limerick	3	2	0	1	36	34	2	4	Advance to phase 1 final
3	Clare	3	1	0	2	44	38	6	2	
4	Waterford	3	0	0	3	13	32	−19	0	

==== Munster phase 1 group stage fixtures ====
13 April 2023 Round 1	Limerick	0-07 - 1-11	Tipperary	Mick Neville Park
	E Curry 0-4 (0-1 free); T Glynn, R Allen (free), A Lyons (free) 0-1 each.	Report	R O’Brien 1-3 (0-2 frees); L Freaney, B Tierney (0-1 free, 0-1 ‘45’) 0-2 each; C Grace, S Lewis, S Ryan, S Quigley 0-1 each.	Referee: J O'Regan (Cork)

13 April 2023 Round 1	Waterford	0-08 - 3-12	Clare	Páirc Naomh Bríd
	L Kiersey, L English (0-2 frees), P McCarthy (0-1 free, 0-1 mark), S Keappock (0-2 each).	Report	G Barry (2-2, 0-1 free); D McMahon (1-0); D Townsend (0-3); D Culligan (0-1 free), K Deegan-Herlihy, S O’Connell (0-2 each); E Cahill (0-1 each).	Referee: T McGrath (Limerick)

20 April 2023 Round 2	Clare	0-15 - 4-06	Limerick	Hennessey Memorial Park
	G Barry (0-7, 0-4 frees); D Culligan (0-3, 0-1 free); S O’Connell (0-2); K Deegan-Herlihy, A Weaver, D McMahon (0-1 each)	Report	A Lyons (2-3, 0-3 frees); A Murphy (1-1); T Glynn (1-0); C Costello, P Murphy (0-1 each)	Referee: E Morrissey (Waterford)

20 April 2023 Round 2	Tipperary	3-18 - 1-03	Waterford	FBD Semple Stadium
	R O’Brien (0-6, 0-3f), L Freaney 1-2, M Neville 0-3, E Bonner, M Connellan 1-0 each, J O’Keeffe, T Whyte 0-2 each, B Tierney 0-2f, L Coughlan 0-1.	Report	B Boland 1-0, P McCarthy 0-2f, C Sullivan 0-1.	Referee: E Ó Muircheartaigh (Kerry)

27 April 2023 Round 3	Limerick	1-08 - 0-05	Waterford	Mick Neville Park
	E Curry 1-3; P Murphy 0-2; K O’Kelly, T Glynn, C Meade 0-1 each.	Report	C Sullivan 0-3 (0-2f); L English (free), S Keappock 0-1 each.	Referee: S Joy (Kerry)

27 April 2023 Round 3	Tipperary	0-12 - 0-08	Clare	FBD Semple Stadium
	L Freaney (0-3 frees); L Coughlan, J Quinn (0-2 each); B Tierney (free), J O’Keeffe, S Ryan, R O’Brien, M Neville (0-1 each).	Report	D Culligan (0-4, 2 frees); E Cahill, B Skerritt, G Barry, K Marrinan (0-1 each).	Referee: D O'Callaghan (Limerick)

=== Munster phase 1 final ===
11 May 2023 Phase 1 final	Tipperary	1-06 - 1-09	Limerick	Mallow GAA Complex
	C Grace (1-1), L Freaney (0-2), T Whyte (free), C Walsh (mark) and J O’Keeffe (0-1 each).	Report	D Hogan (1-0), C Buckley (0-2), C Costelloe, C Woulfe, E Curry (free), A Lyons (free), P Murphy, A Murphy and R O’Connell (0-1 each).	Referee: J O'Regan (Cork)

=== Munster quarter-finals ===
11 May 2023 Quarter-final	Cork	2-12 - 0-14	Kerry	Páirc Uí Chaoimh
	D Sheedy (1-5, 2f), S Coakley (1-3), Hetherington, T Cullinane, D O’Mullane and J O’Leary (0-1 each).	Report	P Lane (0-7, 5f), D Kirby and A Carey (0-2 each), J Hoare (’45’), P Moynihan and R Carroll (0-1 each).	Referee: E Morrissey (Waterford)

=== Munster semi-finals ===
18 May 2023 Semi-final	Tipperary	1-14 - 5-09	Cork	FBD Semple Stadium
	C Grace 1-0, S Ryan 0-3, C Walsh 0-3 (0-2 f), B Tierney 0-2 f, M Connellan, R O’Brien (f), L Freaney (f) 0-1 each.	Report	S Coakley 2-2 (0-2 f), D O’Mullane 2-0, D Sheedy 1-3 (0-1 f), G Holland 0-2, D O’Leary, M O’Brien 0-1 each.	Referee: D O'Callaghan (Limerick)

18 May 2023 Semi-final	Limerick	1-02 - 1-19	Kerry	Newcastle West Grounds
	P Murphy 1-0; E Beston, S Guerin (’45) 0-1 each.	Report	P Lane 0-7 (0-2f); D Hogan 1-3; S Gannon 0-5; D O’Keeffe, B Murphy, E Boyle, J Hoare (’45) 0-1 each.	Referee: J Regan (Cork)

=== Munster final ===
2 June 2023 Final	Kerry	2-10 - 0-11	Cork	Austin Stack Park
	P Lane 1-5 (5fs), D Hogan 1-0, T Kennedy 0-2, S O Cuinn 0-1, S Gannon 0-1, P Fitzgerald 0-1	Report	D Sheedy 0-3 (1f), T Cullinane 0-3, B Curtin 0-1 (f), O Foley 0-1, D Clifford 0-1, D O’Leary 0-1, S Coakley 0-1	Referee: E Morrissey (Waterford)

== Ulster Minor Football Championship ==
=== Group A ===
Pos	Team	Pld	W	D	L	SF	SA	Diff	Pts	Qualification
1	Derry	4	4	0	0	86	17	69	8	Advance to quarter-finals
3	Monaghan	4	3	0	1	67	46	21	6	Advance to quarter-finals
2	Donegal	4	2	0	2	59	52	7	4	Advance to quarter-finals
4	Fermanagh	4	1	0	3	37	73	−36	2	Advance to quarter-finals
5	Down	4	0	0	4	36	97	−61	0	

==== Ulster group A fixtures ====
8 April 2023 Round 2	Monaghan	3-17 - 1-10	Down	St. Tiernach's Park
	M McGinnity 1-8, M Finn 1-1, M Carolan 1-0, T Mallen 0-3, S Óg Elwain 0-1, T Quinn 0-1, C Meehan 0-1, C Jones 0-1, C Grennan 0-1.		R Magorrian 1-2, T O'Hanlon 0-2, C Clerkin 0-2, DJ Farrell 0-1, L Blaney 0-1, D Poland 0-1, J Murphy 0-1.

15 April 2023 Round 1	Fermanagh	0-05 - 3-12	Monaghan	Brewster Park
	B Warnock 0-2, C Mulligan 0-1M McDermott 0-1 (f), D Chapman 0-1 (f)	Report	M McGinnity 1-4 (2f), M Finn 1-2, E McCaffrey 1-0, T Mallen 0-2, S Og McElwain 0-2, M Carolan 0-1, M Maguire 0-1

15 April 2023 Round 1	Down	0-03 - 1-21	Derry	Páirc Esler
	R Magorrian 0-2; B McEvoy 0-1(f).	Report	J Boyle 0-10 (6f); E Young 1-1; O Doherty 0-4; G Dillon 0-3 (1f); J Sargen 0-2 (0-1 pen); J McGuckian 0-1 each.

19 April 2023 Round 2	Donegal	0-15 - 1-07	Fermanagh	MacCumhaill Park
	S Callaghan (4f) 0-6, G Doherty L Clerkin 0-3 each, D Mulholland (1f) 0-2, C McCahill 0-1.	Report	M McDermott (3f) 0-4, D Cathcart 1-0, C Mulligan, L McAnespy, M Burns 0-1 each.	Referee: R Donoghue (Derry)

22 April 2023 Round 3	Derry	1-14 - 0-06	Monaghan	Owenbeg COE
	C Higgins 1-5, J Boyle 0-4, E Young 0-2, O Dogerty 0-1, J Sargent 0-1, G Dillon 0-1.		T Mallen 0-3, T Doherty 0-1, M Maguire 0-1, C Jones 0-1.

23 April 2023 Round 3	Down	0-07 - 3-18	Donegal	Páirc Esler
	R Magorrian 0-6, J McFerran 0-1.		S Callaghan 1-6, C McCahill 1-3, D Mulholland 0-4, J Hegarty 1-0, JJ Sweeney 0-2, L Clerkin 0-1, O Scanlon 0-1, D Gallagher 0-1.

29 April 2023 Round 4	Fermanagh	4-08 - 1-10	Down	Brewster Park
	B Goodwin 3-3, M Burns 1-1, B Warnock 0-2, M McDermott 0-2.		B McEvoy 0-4, D McAleenan 1-0, R Magorrian 0-3, L Ward 0-1, P Woods 0-1, C McGrath 0-1.

29 April 2023 Round 4	Donegal	0-06 - 3-12	Derry	MacCumhaill Park
	S Callaghan 0-5, L Clerkin 0-1.		J Sargent 1-2, J Boyle 0-4, C Spiers 1-0, C Higgins 0-3, G Dillon 0-2, R Small 0-1.

6 May 2023 Round 5	Monaghan	0-14 - 0-11	Donegal	St. Tiernach's Park
	M McGinnity 0-7 (4f), M Finn 0-3, T Doherty, L McKenna 0-2 each.	Report	S Callaghan 0-4 (2f) G Doherty 0-2 (2f), P MacGilolla Bhride 0-2 (1,45, 1), L Clerkin, L McGee, C McCahill 0-1 each.

6 May 2023 Round 5	Derry	2-18 - 0-02	Fermanagh	Owenbeg COE
	C Higgins (1-3), J McGuckin (1-1); G Dillon (0-4, 2f), O Doherty (0-2), L O’Neill (0-2), E Young (0-2), C Speirs (0-1), R Small (0-1), T Rogers (0-1), J Sergent (0-1).	Report	M McDermott (0-1, f); M Burns (0-1).

=== Group B ===
Pos	Team	Pld	W	D	L	SF	SA	Diff	Pts	Quarter-finals
1	Tyrone	3	3	0	0	69	21	48	6	Advance to quarter-finals
2	Cavan	3	2	0	1	60	30	30	4	Advance to quarter-finals
3	Armagh	3	0	1	2	25	42	−17	1	Advance to quarter-finals
4	Antrim	3	0	1	2	17	78	−61	1	Advance to quarter-finals

==== Ulster group B fixtures ====
15 April 2023 Round 1	Cavan	0-12 - 1-10	Tyrone	Kngspan Breffni Park
	J Whyte (0-4f), B O’Hara (0-3, 2f), A Shekleton (0-1), F Brady (0-1), O Madden (0-1), D Noonan (0-1f), A Metlovas (0-1, 45).	Report	D Donaghy (1-0), R McCullagh (0-2, 1f), C Devlin (0-2), C O’Neill (0-1), J Concannon (0-1), B Gallagher (0-1), J Corry (0-1f), L Corry (0-1), A Hegarty (0-1).

15 April 2023 Round 1	Armagh	0-08 - 0-08	Antrim	Box-It Athletic Grounds

22 April 2023 Round 2	Antrim	0-07 - 3-20	Cavan	Antrim COE
	JJ Higgins 0-3, C Ward 0-1, C McEldowney 0-1, S Burns 0-1.		B O'Hara 2-6, J Clarke 1-1, J Shehu 0-4, D Edwards 0-3, D Noonan 0-3, L Allison 0-1, A Shekelton 0-1, C Caldwell 0-1.

22 April 2023 Round 2	Tyrone	2-09 - 1-04	Armagh	O'Neills Healy Park
	R McCullagh 1-4, A Hegarty 1-0, J Concannon 0-2, J Corr 0-1, N Farrey 0-1, M Howe 0-1.		D McNulty 1-1, P Hendron 0-2, C Hughes 0-1.

29 April 2023 Round 3	Tyrone	8-17 - 0-02	Antrim	O'Neills Healy Park
	D Donaghy 3-3, M Howe 2-1, C O'Neill 1-1, L Corry 0-4, B Gallagher 1-0, J Corry 1-0, K Nelson 0-2, N Farry 0-2, J Concannon 0-1, C Devlin 0-1, L Lawn 0-1, S Corry 0-1.		J Blaney 0-1, M McKenna 0-1.

29 April 2023 Round 3	Armagh	1-07 - 1-16	Cavan	Box-It Athletic Grounds
	C McGeogh 1-1, M McKinley 0-3, F Ó Tuathail 0-1, P Hendron 0-1.	Report	O Madden 1-0, D Noonan 0-3, J Shehu 0-3, D Edwards 0-2, B Tully 0-1, B O'Hara 0-1, R Nwaneri 0-1, J Clarke 0-1, C Magee 0-1, J Whyte 0-1, C McAvinney 0-1.

=== Ulster quarter-finals ===
13 May 2023 Quarter-final	Tyrone	6-21 - 2-04	Fermanagh	O'Neills Healy Park
	D Donaghy 2-3 (0-1m), M Howe 1-2, A Hegarty, S Fay 1-1 each, C O’Neill 1-0, R McCullagh 0-6 (4f), N Farry 0-3 (1f), L Hughes, S Corry 0-2 each, C Devlin 0-1	Report	M Burns, O Swift 1-0 each, M McDermott 0-3 (2f), D Cathcart 0-1

13 May 2023 Quarter-final	Derry	2-15 - 0-01	Antrim	Owenbeg COE
	E Young (1-3, 0-2 frees), O Doherty (1-0), J Boyle (0-3), D McGonigle (0-3), T Rogers (0-1), J Sargent (0-1); G Dillon (0-1 free), F McEldowney (0-1), J McGuckian (0-1), L O’Neill (0-1).	Report	C Gribbin (0-1 free).

13 May 2023 Quarter-final	Cavan	2-07 - 1-11	Donegal	Kingspan Breffni Park
	B Tully 1-1,0-1f; D Edwards 1-0; E Ward, J Shehu, B O’Hara (f), J Whyte (f), D Noonan, J Clarke 0-1 each.	Report	L McGee 0-3; O Scanlon 1-0; D Brown 0-2; F Roarty, D Hennigan, L Clerkin, J Hegarty, S Callaghan, C McCahill 0-1 each.

13 May 2023 Quarter-final	Monaghan	2-16 - 2-05	Armagh	St. Mary's Park
	M McGinnity (1-5, 0-3 frees), J McCrystal (1-1), T Mallen (0-3, 0-1 sideline), M Finn (0-2), L McKenna (0-1), A Stewart (0-1); T Doherty (0-1), M Carolan (0-1), Canice Murphy 0-1.	Report	D McNulty (2-1, 0-1 free), A Haughey (0-1), F Ó Tuathail 0-1, C Hughes (0-1 mark), C McGeough (0-1).

=== Ulster semi-finals ===
20 May 2023 Semi-final	Derry	0-09 - 0-04	Donegal	St. Mary's Park
	C Higgins 0-4 (3f), J Sargent 0-3 (1 ’45), G Dillon 0-2 (1f)	Report	D Brown 0-2, S Callaghan 0-1 (1f), E Scott 0-1 (1f)

20 May 2023 Semi-final	Monaghan	2-19 - 4-13; Penalties: 6-5	Tyrone	Shamrock Park
	M Finn 1-4 (0-1 ’45), L McKenna 1-2, M McGinnity 0-8 (8f), S Og McElwain 0-2,, M Carolan, T Mallen, J Mooney (45) 0-1 each.	Report	L Hughes 1-2, L Corry, L Lawn, J Corry 1-0 each, R McCullagh 0-6 (4f), N Farry 0-2 (1f), A Hegarty, J Concannon, T Taggart 0-1 each.

=== Ulster final ===
28 May 2023 Final	Derry	1-15 - 3-09 (aet); Penalties: 4-2	Monaghan	Morgan Athletic Grounds
	C Higgins (0-5, 3f), G Dillon (0-4, 3f), J McGuckin (1-1), J Sargent (0-2, 1 45), O Doherty, T Rogers, C Spiers 0-1 each.	Report	T Mallen (1f) C Jones (1-1 each), S Og McElwain (1-0), M McGinnity (0-2) (2f), L McKenna, M Finn, E McCaffrey, J Mooney, M Maguire 0-1 each.

== All-Ireland Minor Football Championship ==
=== All-Ireland quarter-finals ===
10 June 2023 Quarter-final	Derry	1-13 - 0-04	Galway	Páirc Seán Mac Diarmada
	E Young 1-3, G Dillon 0-5 (4fs), C Spiers 0-2, O Doherty, J McGuckian, D McGuckin.	Report	C Cox 0-2 (1f), C Mulhern 0-1 (1f), B O’Malley 0-1.	Referee: C Dourneen (Cavan)

10 June 2023 Quarter-final	Mayo	1-08 - 1-16	Monaghan	Páirc Seán Mac Diarmada
	D Beirne 0-3, J Carey 1-0, T Lydon 0-2f, C Lynch 0-2, D Neary 0-1.	Report	M Finn 0-5, (0-1f, 0-1 45), M McGinnity 0-4 (0-2f, 0-1m), T Mallen 0-3, C Jones 1-0, S McElwain 0-2, S O’Connell 0-1.

10 June 2023 Quarter-final	Dublin	1-18 - 2-12	Cork	UPMC Nowlan Park
	P Curry 1-4; L Cahill 0-6 (4f); R Mitchell, S Mullarkey (1m, 1f) 0-2 each; J O’Sullivan, J Young, H Curley, A O’Reilly (45) 0-1 each.	Report	S Coakley 1-5 (1-0 pen, 0-3f); D O’Mullane 1-2; D Sheedy 0-2; G Daly, D Clifford, T Cullinane 0-1 each.

10 June 2023 Quarter-final	Kerry	2-13 - 1-11	Kildare	UPMC Nowlan Park
	P Lane 1-7 (0-3f); B Murphy 1-1; J Hoare 0-2 (2f); P Fitzgerald, T Kennedy, D Hogan 0-1 each.	Report	J Cunningham 0-8 (4f); H Redmond 1-0; C Moore (f), J McCabe (f), P O’Dea 0-1 each.

=== All-Ireland semi-finals ===
24 June 2023 Semi-final	Monaghan	1-11 - 0-11	Kerry	Glenisk O'Connor Park
	M McGinnity 0-5 (0-5f), T Mallen 1-1 (1-0f), S Og McElwain 0-4 (0-1m, 0-2f), M Carolan 0-1.	Report	P Lane 0-6 (0-4f), P Fitzgerald 0-1, D Kirby 0-1, O Healy 0-1 (0-1m), A Kennelly 0-1, T Kennedy 0-1.	Referee: J Gilmartin (Sligo)

25 June 2023 Semi-final	Derry	3-11 - 1-08	Dublin	BOX-IT Athletic Grounds
	G Dillon 0-5 (5fs), J Sargent 1-1 (1 45), L Grant and C Spiers 1-0 each, E Young 0-3, O Doherty and T Rogers 0-1 each.	Report	L Cahill 0-4 (4fs), S Mullarkey 1-0, R Mitchell 0-2, N Byrne and L O'Boyle (45) 0-1 each.	Referee: S Laverty (Antrim)

=== All-Ireland final ===
9 July 2023 Final	Monaghan	0-09 - 1-13	Derry	BOX-IT Athletic Grounds
	M Finn (0-4, 0-1 free); M McGinnity (0-3 frees); D Connolly and S Og McElwain (both 0-2).	Report	G Dillon (0-6 frees); C Higgins (0-3, J Sargent (1-0), O Doherty (0-2); C Spiers and E Young (both 0-1).	Referee: S Lonergan (Tipperary)

== Championship statistics ==
=== Top scorers ===
Overall

Rank	Player	County	Tally	Total	Matches	Average
1	Max McGinnity	Monaghan	3-46	55	10	5.50
2	Lenny Cahill	Dublin	2-42	48	7	6.85
3	Paul Honeyman	Leitrim	3-30	39	5	7.80
4	Paddy Lane	Kerry	2-32	38	5	7.60
5	Adam Gillespie	Louth	2-30	36	5	7.20
6	Joey Cunningham	Kildare	0-33	33	6	5.50
6	Ger Dillon	Kildare	0-33	33	10	3.30
8	Matthew Finn	Monaghan	3-22	31	9	3.44
9	Conall Higgins	Derry	2-23	29	8	3.62
10	Darragh Beirne	Mayo	2-21	27	7	3.85

In a single game

Rank	Player	Club	Tally	Total	Opposition
1	Lenny Cahill	Dublin	2-10	16	Westmeath
2	Niall Heneghan	Roscommon	3-04	13	Leitrim
3	Darragh Donaghy	Tyrone	3-03	12	Antrim
3	Barry Goodwin	Fermanagh	3-03	12	Down
3	Ben O'Hara	Cavan	2-06	12	Antrim
6	Rory Gilbert	Wexford	3-02	11	Laois
6	Max McGinnity	Monaghan	1-08	11	Down
8	Paddy Lane	Kerry	1-07	10	Kildare
8	John Boyle	Derry	0-10	10	Down
10	Andrew Lyons	Limerick	2-03	9	Clare
10	Darragh Donaghy	Tyrone	2-03	9	Fermanagh
10	Paul Honeyman	Leitrim	1-06	9	Galway
10	Paul Honeyman	Leitrim	1-06	9	Mayo
10	Shane Callaghan	Donegal	1-06	9	Down
10	Adam Gillespie	Louth	1-06	9	Meath
10	Joey Cunningham	Kildare	0-09	9	Offaly
10	Paul Honeyman	Leitrim	0-09	9	Roscommon
