= Lachlan Murray =

Irish Gaelic footballer

Personal information
- Native name: Lachlan Ó Muirí (Irish)
- Born: 2003 (age 22–23)

Sport
- Sport: Gaelic football
- Position: Full forward
Club
- Years: Club
- 2021–: Desertmartin
Inter-county
- Years: County
- 2022–: Derry
Inter-county titles
- Ulster titles: 2
- All-Irelands: 0
- NFL: 1

Lachlan Murray (born 2003) is an Irish Gaelic footballer who plays for the Derry county team and the Desertmartin club.

== Playing career ==
=== Club ===
Murray joined the Desertmartin senior team in 2021, and helped the team reach the final of the Derry Junior Football Championship. On 30 October 2021, Murray scored six frees as Desertmartin had a ten-point win over Seán Dolans.

=== Inter-county ===
==== Minor and under-20 ====
On 2 July 2021, Murray was at full forward for the 2020 Ulster minor final against Monaghan. Having scored five points, Murray was sent off in the 44th minute of the match. Derry held on to win by 1–15 to 0–15. Derry lodged an appeal against Murray's red card, and he was subsequently cleared to play the All-Ireland semi-final against Meath, which Derry went on to win. On 18 July, 2021, Murray scored 1–2 against Kerry in the All-Ireland final as Derry won the 2020 All-Ireland Minor Football Championship. For his performances in the championship, Murray was named at full forward on the Minor Football Team of the Year.

Murray was on the Derry under-20 panel in 2023. He scored 1–1 in the first round win over Fermanagh, but didn't feature for the rest of the championship due to a rule that bars players from playing with their U20 and senior teams within seven days of each other. Derry contested the Ulster final against Down on 26 April, but Murray didn't play as Derry lost the final by 2–11 to 0–9.

==== Senior ====
Murray joined the Dery senior panel ahead of the 2022 season. On 29 January, Murray made his National League debut, scoring a point in a win over Down. Murray made his championship debut on 1 May, coming on as a late substitute as Derry beat defending All-Ireland champions Tyrone. On 29 May, Murray came on as a substitute in the Ulster final against Donegal as Derry won their first Ulster championship in 24 years. Murray was again used as a sub in the All-Ireland semi-final on 9 July, scoring a late consolation goal in Derry's five-point loss to Galway.

On 2 April 2023, Derry faced Dublin in the Division 2 league final. Murray was brought on in the second half, as Dublin won the match by seven points. Derry faced Armagh in their second consecutive Ulster final on 14 May. Murray scored a late point in extra-time to put Derry into the lead, but Armagh sent the game to a penalty shoot-out. Derry won the shoot-out 3–1, winning back-to-back Ulster titles. On 16 July, Murray came on as a late substitute in Derry's All-Ireland semi-final loss to defending champions Kerry.

In the 2024 league, Derry topped the table, qualifying for the final against Dublin. Murray started the final at corner forward, and scored three points as Derry won the league for the first time since 2008 after a penalty shoot-out win.

== Honours ==
Derry

- National Football League: 2024
- Ulster Senior Football Championship: 2022, 2023
- All-Ireland Minor Football Championship: 2020
- Ulster Minor Football Championship: 2020

Desertmartin

- Derry Junior Football Championship: 2021

Individual

- Electric Ireland GAA Minor Football Team of the Year: 2020
