= 2020 All-Ireland Minor Football Championship =

89th staging of the All-Ireland Minor Football Championship

All-Ireland Minor Football Championship 2020
Championship details
- Dates: 17 October 2020 – 18 July 2021
- Teams: 31

All-Ireland Champions
- Winning team: Derry (5th win)
- Captain: Matthew Downey
- Manager: Martin Boyle

All-Ireland Finalists
- Losing team: Kerry
- Captain: Oisín Maunsell
- Manager: James Costello

Provincial Champions
- Munster: Kerry
- Leinster: Meath
- Ulster: Derry
- Connacht: Roscommon

Championship statistics
- No. matches played: 30
- Goals total: 78 (2.60 per game)
- Points total: 631 (21.03 per game)
- Top Scorer: Matthew Downey (3–24); Stephen Mooney (2–27)
- Player of the Year: Matthew Downey

The 2020 All-Ireland Minor Football Championship was the 89th staging of the All-Ireland Minor Football Championship since its establishment by the Gaelic Athletic Association in 1929. The championship began on 17 October 2020 and due to the COVID-19 pandemic, didn't end until 18 July 2021.

Cork were the defending champions, but lost to Kerry in the Munster semi-final.

The final took place on 18 July 2021, between Kerry and Derry. Derry won the match by 2–12 to 1–14 to win their fifth title, and their first since 2002.

Monaghan's Stephen Mooney and Derry captain Matthew Downey were the championship's joint-top scorers. Downey was also named Minor Footballer of the Year.

== Munster Minor Football Championship ==
=== Quarter-finals ===
12 December 2020 Quarter-final	Limerick	2–12 – 1–5	Waterford	Limerick
13:00	David O'Shaughnessy 1–5 (1–0 pen, 0–3f, 0–1m, 0–1 sideline), James Killian 1–0, Padhraic McMahon 0–2, Darragh Bridgeman 0–1, Ciaran O’Sullivan 0–1, Gary Sheehan 0–1, Oisin Enright 0–1, Paddy Kennedy 0–1	Report	Barry Power 0–3 (0–3f), Sam Pender 1–0, Alan Dunwoody 0–1 (0–1f), Oscar Geoghegan 0–1	Stadium: Gaelic Grounds; Referee: Niall Quinn (Clare)

12 December 2020 Quarter-final	Clare	1–24 – 1–4	Tipperary	Thurles
17:00	Diarmuid Fahy 1–6 (0–1f), Cillian McGroary 0–5, Craig Riordan 0–4 (0–3f), Dara Nagle 0–3, Dylan O'Brien 0–2, Brian McNamara 0–1, Fionn Kelleher 0–1, Josh Guyler 0–1, Sean McMahon 0–1	Report	Toby Lambe 1–0, Jack Buckley 0–2 (0–2f), Liam McCormack 0–2	Stadium: Semple Stadium; Referee: Jonathan Hayes (Limerick)

=== Semi-finals ===
15 December 2020 Semi-final	Kerry	0–21 – 1–15 (a.e.t.)	Cork	Tralee
19:00	Cian McMahon 0–8 (0–6f), Darragh O'Sullivan 0–4 (0–3f, 0–1m), William Shine 0–3 (0–2f), Ruairi Burns 0–3 (0–2f), Oisín Maunsell 0–1, Thomas O'Donnell 0–1, Jordan Kissane 0–1	Report	Conor Hanlon 1–5 (0–4f), Colin Walsh 0–6 (0–1f), Ciaran McCarthy 0–1 (0–1f), Sean Brady 0–1, Hugh O'Connor 0–1, Alan Sheehy 0–1	Stadium: Austin Stack Park; Referee: Chris Maguire (Clare)

16 December 2020 Semi-final	Clare	4–20 – 1–10	Limerick	Limerick
19:00	Cillian McGroary 2–2, Dylan O'Brien 1–2, Dara Nagle 0–4, Craig Riordan 1–1 (0–1 '45), Diarmuid Fahy 0–2 (0–1f), Eoin Killeen 0–2, Brendy Rouine 0–2, Michael Nash 0–2, Josh Guyler 0–1, Daithi Lohan 0–1, Fionn Kelleher 0–1	Report	David O'Shaughnessy 0–9 (0–6f), Darragh Bridgeman 1–0 (1–0 pen), Gary Sheehan 0–1	Stadium: Gaelic Grounds; Referee: Seamus Mulvihill (Kerry)

=== Final ===
22 December 2020 Final	Kerry	2–14 – 1–7	Clare	Limerick
19:00	Cian McMahon 1–2 (0–1f), Keith Evans 1–2, Darragh O'Sullivan 0–2 (0–1f), Cillian Burke 0–2, Paudie O'Leary 0–2, Oisín Maunsell 0–1, Caolán Ó Connaill 0–1, Ruairi Burns 0–1, Maurice O'Connell 0–1	Report	Craig Riordan 1–1 (0–1f), Diarmuid Fahy 0–3 (0–3f), Brendy Rouine 0–2, Michael Nash 0–1	Stadium: Gaelic Grounds; Referee: Jonathan Hayes (Limerick); Man of the Match: Cillian Burke (Kerry)

== Leinster Minor Football Championship ==
=== First round ===
17 October 2020 First round	Meath	1–15 – 0–7	Dublin	Navan
14:00	Eoghan Frayne 0–7 (0–2f), Aaron Murphy 1–1, Ruairí Kinsella 0–3, John McDonagh 0–2, Ciarán Caulfield 0–1 (0–1f), Conor Gray 0–1	Report	Darragh Dempsey 0–2 (0–2f), Conor Dolan 0–1 (0–1f), Sean Gannon 0–1, Luke Ward 0–1, Eoin O’Connor Flanagan 0–1, Luke Breathnach 0–1	Stadium: Páirc Tailteann; Referee: Alan Coyle (Westmeath)

17 October 2020 First round	Louth	0–15 – 1–6	Wexford	Darver
14:00	Kyle McElroy 0–7 (0–3f, 0–1m), Tom Matthews 0–2, Lee Grifferty 0–1 (0–1f), Enda O'Neill 0–1 (0–1f), Cameron Maher 0–1, Paul Brennan 0–1, Sean Reynolds 0–1, Cian Connor 0–1	Report	Rian Fitzpatrick 1–1 (1–0 pen), Michael Mackey 0–3 (0–3f), Alan Mahoney 0–1 (0–1f), Jack Higgins 0–1	Stadium: Louth GAA Centre of Excellence; Referee: Seamus Farrelly (Dublin)

17 October 2020 First round	Wicklow	4–14 – 3–9	Longford	Aughrim
15:30	Eoin Doyle 1–8 (0–5f), Joe Prendergast 2–0, Cathal Baker 1–0, Tom Keogh 0–2, J. P. Nolan 0–2, Mikey O'Rourke 0–1, Finn Treacy 0–1	Report	Michael Hynes 1–3 (0–1f), Emmet Brady 1–2 (0–1f), Ruairi Corcoran 1–0, Kevin Tansey 0–2, Josh Sorohan 0–2	Stadium: Aughrim County Ground; Referee: Kieran Harris (Kildare)

=== Quarter-finals ===
12 December 2020 Quarter-final	Kildare	2–16 – 1–7	Louth	Newbridge
12:30	Adam Fanning 0–5 (0–3f), Oisin O'Sullivan 0–4, Darragh Sloane 1–0, Fionn Ó Giolláin 1–0, Darragh Swords 0–2, Shane Farrell 0–2, Cian Grimes 0–1 (0–1f), Ben Fitzsimons 0–1, Charlie Litton 0–1	Report	Kyle McElroy 0–5 (0–4f), Tom Matthews 1–2 (0–2f)	Stadium: St Conleth's Park; Referee: Stephen Fagan (Wicklow)

12 December 2020 Quarter-final	Offaly	2–9 – 0–9	Wicklow	Tullamore
12:30	Jamie Guing 0–4, Cormac Egan 1–1, Alex Egan 1–0, Keith O'Neill 0–3, John Furlong 0–1	Report	Eoin Doyle 0–7 (0–6f), Tom Keogh 0–1, Liam O'Neill 0–1	Stadium: O'Connor Park; Referee: Gary Hurley (Westmeath)

12 December 2020 Quarter-final	Meath	3–11 – 0–7	Westmeath	Navan
12:30	Ruairí Kinsella 1–2, John McDonagh 1–2, Eoghan Frayne 0–4 (0–1f, 0–1 '45), Aaron Murphy 1–0, Alan Bowden 0–2, Ciarán Caulfield 0–1	Report	Danny McCartan 0–3 (0–3f), Senan Baker 0–2, Sean Leech 0–1 (0–1f), Mikey Moffat 0–1	Stadium: Páirc Tailteann; Referee: Chris Dwyer (Offaly)

12 December 2020 Quarter-final	Laois	2–14 – 0–5	Carlow	Portlaoise
12:30	Colin Dunne 1–6 (0–1f, 0–1m), Conor Kelly 0–3, Conor Heffernan 1–0, Kieran O'Donnell 0–2 (0–1f, 0–1 '45), Ross Meredith 0–1, Shaun Fitzpatrick 0–1, Kian Lawlor 0–1	Report	Bryan McMahon 0–2 (0–2f), Oisin Dillon 0–1, Conor O’Neill 0–1, Ronan Quinlan 0–1	Stadium: O'Moore Park; Referee: Marius Stones (Offaly)

=== Semi-finals ===
19 December 2020 Semi-final	Kildare	2–7 – 2–10	Offaly	Newbridge
12:30	Oisin O'Sullivan 2–2, Adam Fanning 0–4 (0–3f), Ben Fitzsimons 0–1	Report	Keith O'Neill 1–4 (0–2f, 0–1m), Cathal Ryan 1–1, Jamie Guing 0–2, John Furlong 0–1, Pauric Robbins 0–1, Cormac Egan 0–1	Stadium: St Conleth's Park; Referee: David O'Connor (Dublin)

19 December 2020 Semi-final	Meath	2–10 – 1–7	Laois	Navan
12:30	Alan Bowden 1–3, Eoghan Frayne 0–4 (0–2f, 0–1m), Liam Stafford 1–0, John McDonagh 0–1, Ruairí Kinsella 0–1, Mark Coffey 0–1	Report	Colin Dunne 0–4 (0–4f), Kieran O'Donnell 1–0, Conor Kelly 0–2, Ross Meredith 0–1	Stadium: Páirc Tailteann; Referee: Eamon O'Connor (Offaly)

=== Final ===
30 June 2021 Final	Meath	1–7 – 1–6	Offaly	Mullingar
19:30	Eoghan Frayne 0–6 (0–3f, 0–1 '45), Liam Stafford 1–0, Ruairí Kinsella 0–1	Report	Jamie Guing 0–4 (0–2f), Pauric Robbins 1–0, Keith O'Neill 0–1 (0–1f), Cormac Egan 0–1	Stadium: Cusack Park; Referee: David Fedigan (Louth); Man of the Match: Eoghan Frayne (Meath)

== Ulster Minor Football Championship ==
=== Preliminary round ===
17 October 2020 Preliminary round	Monaghan	1–8 – 1–7	Cavan	Clones
14:00	Stephen Mooney 1–7 (0–6f), Dylan Byrne 0–1	Report	Shane Tynan 0–3 (0–2f), Liam Fay 1–0, Ryan Brady 0–1, Caolain McCabe 0–1, Philip Smyth 0–1, Cormac Brady 0–1	Stadium: St Tiernach's Park; Referee: Enda Mallon (Armagh)

=== Quarter-finals ===
20 December 2020 Quarter-final	Fermanagh	0–10 – 1–4	Down	Enniskillen
13:00	Fionan O'Brien 0–3, Ronan McCaffrey 0–2, Ronan McGovern 0–2, Conall Boyle 0–1, Cillian Murray 0–1, Conor McGovern 0–1	Report	Niall Toner 1–1, Oisin Savage 0–2, Zach Murdock 0–1	Stadium: Brewster Park; Referee: Cathal McDermott (Antrim)

20 December 2020 Quarter-final	Donegal	0–7 – 0–8	Tyrone	Ballybofey
13:00	Eoin O'Donnell 0–2, Luke McGlynn 0–1 (0–1f), Conor O'Neill 0–1 (0–1m), Robbie McDonnell 0–1, Senan Quinn 0–1, Blake McGarvey 0–1	Report	Ruairí Canavan 0–5 (0–1f), Harry Morgan 0–1 (0–1 '45), Oran McGrath 0–1, Conor McGillion 0–1	Stadium: MacCumhaill Park; Referee: Pat Clarke (Cavan)

20 December 2020 Quarter-final	Derry	1–7 – 0–8	Armagh	Dungiven
13:00	Matthew Downey 0–5 (0–4f), Dan Higgins 1–1, Lachlan Murray 0–1	Report	Ronan Fitzpatrick 0–5 (0–2f), Adam Garvey 0–1, Matthew Lennon 0–1, Darragh McMullen 0–1	Stadium: Owenbeg; Referee: Enda McFeely (Donegal)

20 December 2020 Quarter-final	Antrim	0–8 – 2–17	Monaghan	Belfast
13:00	Sean Duffin 0–5 (0–4f), Ryan McQuillan 0–2 (0–1f), Callum Higgins 0–1	Report	Stephen Mooney 1–8 (0–5f), Niall Rice 0–3, James Slevin 1–0, Tiarnan O'Rourke 0–2, Connor Eccles 0–1, Dan McCahey 0–1, Michael Hamill 0–1, Cian Conlon 0–1	Stadium: Corrigan Park; Referee: Barry McMenamin (Cavan)

=== Semi-finals ===
26 June 2021 Semi-final	Derry	3–10 – 2–12	Tyrone	Armagh
13:00	Matthew Downey 2–2 (1–0 pen, 0–2f), Niall O'Donnell 1–1, Charlie Diamond 0–3 (0–2f), Lachlan Murray 0–2, Eoin McEvoy 0–1, Dan Higgins 0–1	Report	Conor McGillion 1–2, Conor Cush 0–4 (0–2f), Cormac Devlin 1–1, Ruairí Canavan 0–2 (0–1f), Harry Morgan 0–1 (0–1 '45), Conor Colton 0–1, Ruairí McHugh 0–1	Stadium: Athletic Grounds; Referee: Darren O'Hare (Down)

26 June 2021 Semi-final	Fermanagh	2–10 – 3–10	Monaghan	Cavan
15:00	Sean Conlon 1–1 (0–1m), Justy McDade 1–1, Fionan O'Brien 0–2 (0–2f), Ronan McCaffrey 0–2 (0–1f), Diarmaid King 0–2, Ronan McGovern 0–1, Micheál Flanagan 0–1	Report	Stephen Mooney 0–5 (0–2f), Michael Hamill 1–0, James Slevin 1–0, Dylan O'Reilly 1–0, Cian Conlon 0–1 (0–1f), Dylan Byrne 0–1, Connor Eccles 0–1, Diarmuid Marron 0–1, Dan McCahey 0–1	Stadium: Breffni Park; Referee: Conor Dourneen (Cavan)

=== Final ===
2 July 2021 Final	Derry	1–15 – 1–10	Monaghan	Omagh
19:30	Matthew Downey 0–6 (0–4f), Lachlan Murray 0–5 (0–1m), Charlie Diamond 0–3 (0–2f), Niall O'Donnell 1–0, Ryan McEldowney 0–1	Report	Stephen Mooney 0–7 (0–7f), Cian Conlon 0–3 (0–1 '45), Dan McCahey 0–2, Diarmuid Marron 0–1, Niall Rice 0–1, Nathan Lavery 0–1	Stadium: Healy Park; Referee: James Lewis (Fermanagh); Man of the Match: Mark Doherty (Derry)

== Connacht Minor Football Championship ==
=== Quarter-final ===
12 December 2020 Quarter-final	Galway	2–17 – 0–12	Leitrim	Bekan
	Cillian Ó Curraoin 2–3 (0–3f), Conall Gallagher 0–6, David Prendergast 0–2, Darragh O’Malley 0–1, Adam Tierney 0–1, Darragh Burke 0–1, Maidhc Mac Gearailt 0–1, Rory Donnellan 0–1, Gary Higgins 0–1	Report	Oisin Curley 0–4 (0–2f), Jack Casey 0–2 (0–1m), Shane Smith 0–2, Jack Tobin 0–1 (0–1m), Conor Quinn 0–1, Gavin Reynolds 0–1, Paul Moran 0–1	Stadium: Connacht GAA Centre of Excellence; Referee: John Glavey (Mayo)

=== Semi-finals ===
18 December 2020 Semi-final	Roscommon	2–13 – 0–11	Galway	Bekan
	Conor Hand 1–4, Eoin Colleran 0–6 (0–4f, 0–2m), Darren Gately 1–1, Ryan Conlon 0–1, Bobby Nugent 0–1	Report	Maidhc Mac Gearailt 0–4, Cillian Ó Curraoin 0–2 (0–2f), David Prendergast 0–1 (0–1 pen), Conall Gallagher 0–1, Rory Donnellan 0–1, Jack Dowd 0–1, Darragh O'Malley 0–1	Stadium: Connacht GAA Centre of Excellence; Referee: Michael McGirl (Leitrim)

20 December 2020 Semi-final	Mayo	1–7 – 1–9	Sligo	Bekan
	Cian McHale 0–5 (0–3f), Sam Callinan 1–1, Mark Gibbons 0–1	Report	Adam Gallagher 1–1, Dylan Walsh 0–3 (0–3f), Luke Marren 0–3, Ciaran O'Reilly 0–2	Stadium: Connacht GAA Centre of Excellence; Referee: Thomas Murphy (Galway)

=== Final ===
26 December 2020 Final	Roscommon	1–5 – 1–2	Sligo	Bekan
	Conor Hand 0–3, Shane Walsh 1–0, Eoin Colleran 0–1 (0–1f), Oisín Cregg 0–1	Report	Dylan Walsh 1–0 (1–0f), Canice Mulligan 0–1, Simon McKeon 0–1	Stadium: Connacht GAA Centre of Excellence; Referee: Patrick Guckian (Leitrim); Man of the Match: Oisín Cregg (Roscommon)

== All-Ireland Minor Football Championship ==
=== Semi-finals ===
10 July 2021 Semi-final	Meath	1–7 – 1–14	Derry	Newry
	Eoghan Frayne 1–1 (0–1f), Adam McDonnell 0–2, John McDonagh 0–1 (0–1f), Liam Stafford 0–1, Seán Emmanuel 0–1, Ruairí Kinsella 0–1	Report	Matthew Downey 0–8 (0–5f), Dan Higgins 1–0, Mark Doherty 0–2, Charlie Diamond 0–1, Jody McDermott 0–1, Lachlan Murray 0–1, Connor Shiels 0–1	Stadium: Páirc Esler; Referee: Barry Judge (Sligo)

11 July 2021 Semi-final	Roscommon	2–13 – 3–21	Kerry	Limerick
	Conor Hand 1–4 (0–1f), Eoin Colleran 0–6 (0–4f), Ryan Conlon 1–0, Darren Gately 0–2 (0–1f, 0–1m), Colm Neary 0–1	Report	Cian McMahon 1–5 (0–2f), Keith Evans 1–5, Darragh O'Sullivan 1–4 (0–1f), William Shine 0–2, Jordan Kissane 0–2, Paudie O'Leary 0–1, Maurice O'Connell 0–1, Marc Manning 0–1	Stadium: Gaelic Grounds; Referee: Sean Lonergan (Tipperary)

=== Final ===
18 July 2021 Final	Derry	2–12 – 1–14	Kerry	Tullamore
	Matthew Downey 1–3 (1–0 pen, 0–2f), Lachlan Murray 1–2, Mark Doherty 0–2, Charlie Diamond 0–1 (0–1f), Eoin McEvoy 0–1, Lee Brady 0–1, Niall O'Donnell 0–1, Calum Downey 0–1	Report	Cian McMahon 0–4 (0–2f), Maurice O'Connell 1–0, Oisín Maunsell 0–2, Cillian Burke 0–2, William Shine 0–2, Keith Evans 0–2, Seán Broderick 0–1 (0–1 '45), Aaron O'Shea 0–1	Stadium: O'Connor Park; Referee: Jerome Henry (Mayo); Man of the Match: Mark Doherty (Derry)

== Championship statistics ==
=== Top scorers overall ===
Rank	Player	County	Tally	Total	Matches	Average
1	Matthew Downey	Derry	3–24	33	5	6.60
1	Stephen Mooney	Monaghan	2–27	33	4	8.25
3	Cian McMahon	Kerry	2–19	25	4	6.25
3	Eoghan Frayne	Meath	1–22	25	5	5.00
5	Eoin Doyle	Wicklow	1–15	18	2	9.00
6	Conor Hand	Roscommon	2–11	17	3	5.67
6	David O'Shaughnessy	Limerick	1–14	17	2	8.50
8	Keith Evans	Kerry	2–9	15	4	3.75
9	Lachlan Murray	Derry	1–11	14	5	2.80
9	Diarmuid Fahy	Clare	1–11	14	3	4.67

=== Top scorers in a single game ===
Rank	Player	County	Tally	Total	Opposition
1	Stephen Mooney	Monaghan	1–8	11	Antrim
1	Eoin Doyle	Wicklow	1–8	11	Longford
3	Stephen Mooney	Monaghan	1–7	10	Cavan
4	Cillian Ó Curraoin	Galway	2–3	9	Leitrim
4	Diarmuid Fahy	Clare	1–6	9	Tipperary
4	Colin Dunne	Laois	1–6	9	Carlow
4	David O'Shaughnessy	Limerick	0–9	9	Clare
8	Matthew Downey	Derry	2–2	8	Tyrone
8	Cillian McGroary	Derry	2–2	8	Limerick
8	Cian McMahon	Kerry	1–5	8	Roscommon
8	Keith Evans	Kerry	1–5	8	Roscommon
8	Conor Hanlon	Cork	1–5	8	Kerry
8	David O'Shaughnessy	Limerick	1–5	8	Waterford
8	Oisin O'Sullivan	Kildare	2–2	8	Offaly
8	Matthew Downey	Derry	0–8	8	Meath
8	Cian McMahon	Kerry	0–8	8	Cork
