= 2022 All-Ireland Minor Football Championship =

Gaelic football competition

All-Ireland Minor Football Championship 2022
Championship details
- Dates: 19 March - 8 July 2022
- Teams: 31

All-Ireland Champions
- Winning team: Galway (7th win)
- Captain: Jack Lonergan; Éanna Monaghan
- Manager: Alan Glynn

All-Ireland Finalists
- Losing team: Mayo
- Captain: Diarmuid Duffy; Ronan Clarke
- Manager: Seán Deane

Provincial Champions
- Munster: Cork
- Leinster: Dublin
- Ulster: Tyrone
- Connacht: Mayo

Championship statistics
- No. matches played: 66
- Top Scorer: Ronan Clarke (3-43)
- Player of the Year: Tomás Farthing

The 2022 All-Ireland Minor Football Championship was the 91st staging of the All-Ireland Minor Football Championship since its establishment by the Gaelic Athletic Association in 1929. The championship began on 19 March 2022 and ended on 8 July 2022.

Meath entered the championship as the defending champions, however, they were beaten in all three of their group stage games in the Leinster Championship.

The All-Ireland final was played on 8 July 2022 at Dr. Hyde Park in Roscommon, between Galway and Mayo, in what was their first ever meeting in an All-Ireland final but their third meeting in that year's championship. Galway won the match by 0-15 to 0-09 to claim their seventh championship title overall and a first title in 15 years.

Mayo's Ronan Clarke was the championship's top scorer with 3-43.

== Connacht Minor Football Championship ==
Key to colours
Advance to Connacht final
Advance to Connacht semi-final
Advance to Connacht shield final

=== Connacht group table ===
Pos	Team	Pld	W	D	L	SF	SA	Diff	Pts
1	Mayo	4	4	0	0	83	43	40	8
2	Galway	4	2	0	2	68	58	10	4
3	Sligo	4	2	0	2	76	87	-11	4
4	Leitrim	4	1	1	2	60	80	-20	3
5	Roscommon	4	0	1	3	60	79	-19	1

=== Connacht group stage results ===
22 April 2022 Round 1	Mayo	2-16 - 0-06	Leitrim	James Stephens Park
	R Clarke 1-8, D Duffy 1-0, N Hurley 0-3, D Gallagher 0-1, J Maheady 0-1, J Keane 0-1, O Cronin 0-1, O Armstrong 0-1.		P Honeyman 0-2, E Moyles 0-1, B Guckian 0-1, T Plunkett 0-1, N McManus 0-1.

22 April 2022 Round 1	Galway	3-19 - 1-12	Roscommon	Tuam Stadium
	E Monaghan 1-5, C Costello 0-7, S Curley 1-1, O Morgan 1-0, S Dunne 0-2, C Cox 0-2, K Gilmore 0-1, C Trayers 0-1.	Report	R Heneghan 1-2, R McCarthy 0-4, R Dowling 0-2, E Murray 0-1, R McDermott 0-1, B Greene 0-1, J Curran 0-1.

29 April 2022 Round 2	Sligo	0-08 - 4-12	Galway	Markievicz Park
	R Niland 0-5, R Gillespie 0-1, R O'Kelly-Lynch 0-1, D Walsh 0-1.		E Monaghan 1-6, C Costello 0-4, O Kelly 1-0, J Lonergan 1-0, S Curley 1-0, O Morgan 0-2.

29 April 2022 Round 2	Roscommon	1-11 - 0-16	Mayo	Dr. Hyde Park
	R Carty 0-4, R Heneghan 0-4, J Curran 1-0, B Greene 0-1, R Dowling 0-1, C Kelly 0-1.		R Clarke 0-7, N Hurley 0-4, J Keane 0-1, J Maheady 0-1, D Dolan 0-1, L Silke 0-1, J McMonagle 0-1.

6 May 2022 Round 3	Leitrim	1-13 - 1-13	Roscommon	Avant Money Páirc Seán Mac Diarmada
	P Honeyman (1-3, 1 free), B Guckian (0-4, all frees), J Maye (0-2), T Plunkett (0-1); E Moyles (0-1), D Greenan (0-1), L Chandler (0-1).	Report	R Heneghan (1-4, 2 frees), R Carthy (0-2, 1 free), E Murray (0-1), J McGuinness (0-1), R Dowling (0-1), B Murphy (0-1); J Curran (0-1), D Hagney (0-1), TJ Hannon (0-1).

6 May 2022 Round 3	Mayo	2-21 - 3-10	Sligo	James Stephens Park
	R Clarke (0-9), N Hurley (1-1), Z Collins (1-1), J Keane (0-3), D Duffy (0-1); C Keavney (0-1), D Dolan (0-1); L Silke (0-1); L Maloney (0-1), O Cronin (0-1), D Gallagher (0-1).	Report	Ronan Niland (0-6), Eli Rooney (1-2), Cian Carty (1-1); Tommy Ross (1-0), Diarmuid Henry (0-1).

13 May 2022 Round 4	Sligo	4-18 - 2-15	Leitrim	Markievicz Park
	J Foley 1-6; C Carty 2-2; E Rooney 1-3 (0-1m), D Walsh, R Niland (1f), S O’Neill 0-2 each; D King 0-1.	Report	P Honeyman 1-7(3f); L Chandler 1-2(45); B Guckian 0-2; J Maye, T Plunkett, J Foley, N McManus 0-1 each.

13 May 2022 Round 4	Galway	0-04 - 1-15	Mayo	Tuam Stadium
	E Monaghan 0-2 (2f); S Dunne, S Curley (m) 0-1 each.	Report	D Duffy 1-2; J Maheady, N Hurley (1m) 0-3 each; D Dolan (2f), R Clarke 0-2 each; J Keane, R Mortimer, D Gallagher 0-1 each.

20 May 2022 Round 5	Leitirm	3-08 - 0-12	Galway	Avant Money Páirc Seán Mac Diarmada
	D Shortt 1-1; Ben Guckian 0-4 (2f); F Curley, T Plunkett 1-0 each; L Chandler 0-2 (f); P Honeyman 0-1.	Report	C Costello 0-7 (4f); F O’Connor 0-4 (f); O Morgan 0-1.

20 May 2022 Round 5	Roscommon	0-15 - 1-16	Sligo	Dr. Hyde Park
	R Heneghan 0-4 (1f); R Carthy (3f), TJ Hannon 0-3 each; E Murray 0-2; R Hanley, J Betts, R Dowling 0-1 each.	Report	D Walsh 0-4; R O’Kelly-Lynch 1-1; C Flynn, R Niland (1f) 0-3 each; Eli Rooney 0-2; D Henry (1 ‘45’), R Gillespie, J Foley 0-1 each.

=== Connacht semi-final ===
27 May 2022 Semi-final	Galway	3-15 - 1-13	Sligo	Tuam Stadium
	E Monaghan 1-9, C Costello 1-3, C Cox 1-0, S Dunne 0-2, S Curley 0-1,		C Carty 1-2, R Niland 0-4, T Ross 0-3, D King 0-1, E Rooney 0-1, G Lynch 0-1, R Gillespie 0-1.

=== Connacht shield final ===
3 June 2022 Shield final	Roscommon	4-14 - 1-09	Leitrim	Dr. Hyde Park

=== Connacht final ===
6 June 2022 Final	Mayo	0-13 - 0-07	Galway	Hastings Insurance MacHale Park
	N Hurley 0-5, R Clarke 0-4 (3f), L Feeney (m), D Dolan (f), J Keane and Z Collins 0-1	Report	C Costello 0-3f, C Trayers 0-2, V Gill and S Curley 0-1 each	Attendance: 1,733

== Leinster Minor Football Championship ==
Key to colours
Advance to Leinster semi-finals
Advance to Leinster quarter-finals
Advance to Leinster preliminary quarter-finals

=== Leinster group 1 table ===
Pos	Team	Pld	W	D	L	SF	SA	Diff	Pts
1	Dublin	3	3	0	0	71	19	52	6
2	Laois	3	2	0	1	51	44	7	4
3	Westmeath	3	1	0	2	36	47	-11	2
4	Louth	3	0	0	3	27	75	-48	0

=== Leinster group 1 results ===
19 March 2022 Round 1	Louth	1-01 - 5-14	Dublin	Stabannon Parnells GAA Grounds
	A Gillespie 1-0, T McDonnell 0-1 (f).	Report	J Quigley 1-4 (0-1f), D Mulqueen 2-0, C Ó Riain 1-3 (1f), C Burke 1-0, C Donovan 0-3 (1f), L Murphy 0-1; J Brady 0-1, P Reynolds 0-1, S Mullarkey 0-1.

19 March 2022 Round 1	Laois	3-07 - 0-10	Westmeath	MW Hire O'Moore Park
	R Little 2-1, D Costello 0-4, A Hunt 1-0, H Emerson 0-1, E Johnston 0-1.		T Baker 0-3, R Cole 0-2, T O'Donovan 0-1, O Shortall 0-1, R Murray 0-1, J Martin 0-1, S Corcoran 0-1.

2 April 2022 Round 2	Westmeath	1-12 - 0-11	Louth	TEG Cusack Park
	J Martin 1-6, P Murphy 0-2, P Ballesty 0-2, J Duncan 0-1, S Corcoran 0-1.		D Reilly 0-4, D Dorian 0-2, J McGuire 0-2, T McDonnell 0-1, S Callaghan 0-1, D Conlon 0-1.

2 April 2022 Round 2	Dublin	2-15 - 0-04	Laois	Parnell Park
	J Quigley 1-8 (0-5 frees), D Mulqueen 0-4, S Mullarkey 1-0, R Mitchell 0-1, C Burke 0-1, C Donovan 0-1 (free).	Report	D Costello 0-2 (frees), J Kelly 0-1 (free), E Cawley 0-1.	Referee: F Pierce (Offaly)

20 April 2022 Round 3	Westmeath	0-11 - 2-14	Dublin	TEG Cusack Park
	J Duncan 0-4, A Keane 0-2, J Martin 0-2, P Murphy 0-1, R Cole 0-1, R Murray 0-1.		J Quigley 0-6, D Mulqueen 1-2, D Lucey 1-0, D Clark 0-2, N Fitzgerald 0-1, P Reynolds-Hand 0-1, C Burke 0-1, C Ó Riain 0-1.

20 April 2022 Round 3	Laois	4-19 - 0-12	Louth	MW Hire O'Moore Park
	R Little 2-6, D Costello 2-1, C Geoghegan 0-4, J Kelly 0-2, H Emerson 0-1, J Darcy 0-1, F Mullaly-McEvoy 0-1, K Byrne 0-1, T Bride 0-1, J Behan 0-1.		A Gillespie 0-3, D Reilly 0-2, I Farrell 0-2, D Dorlan 0-2, J Sharkey 0-1, T McDonnell 0-1, A Begley 0-1.

=== Leinster group 2 table ===
Pos	Team	Pld	W	D	L	SF	SA	Diff	Pts
1	Kildare	3	3	0	0	57	29	28	6
2	Longford	3	2	0	1	42	39	3	4
3	Offaly	3	1	0	2	28	52	-24	2
4	Meath	3	0	0	3	40	51	-11	0

=== Leinster group 2 results ===
19 March 2022 Round 1	Offaly	0-05 - 3-12	Kildare	Bord na Móna O'Connor Park
	N Furlong 0-3, C Fox 0-1, C Lowry 0-1.		R Sinkey 2-3, K Browne 1-4, E Cully 0-4, B Ryan 0-1.

19 March 2022 Round 1	Longford	1-11 - 1-10	Meath	Glennon Brothers Pearse Park
	M Carey 0-6, P Moran 1-1, M Flynn 0-2, H Kiernan 0-1, A Flynn 0-1.		C Commons 1-1, M McIvor 0-3, R Stafford 0-2, N McGinley 0-2, R Finnegan 0-1, C McWeeney 0-1.

2 April 2022 Round 2	Kildare	2-12 - 1-08	Longford	St. Conleth's Park
	B Loakman 2-3, K Browne 0-2, T Kelly 0-1, J Hanamy 0-1, E Cully 0-1, B Ryan 0-1, R Sinkey 0-1, C O'Reilly 0-1, R Rainey 0-1.		M Carey 0-6, P Moran 1-2.

2 April 2022 Round 2	Meath	2-08 - 3-06	Offaly	Páirc Tailteann
	M O'Sullivan 2-1 (1-0 pen); N McGinley 0-3 (1f); R Stafford 0-2 (1f); F White 0-1; C McWeeney 0-1;		C Fox 1-0; S Brennan 1-0; S Rigney 1-0; N Furlong 0-3 fs, C Guinan 0-1; C Bourke 0-1; M Farrell 0-1.

20 April 2022 Round 3	Longford	2-11 - 0-08	Offaly	Glennon Brothers Pearse Park
	M Flynn 1-1, H Kiernan 1-1, M Carey 0-4, J Burke 0-2, A Flynn 0-2, R Shields 0-1.		D Shirley 0-2, N Furlong 0-2, B Kennedy 0-1, C Bourke 0-1, S Doran 0-1, R Kelleghan 0-1.

20 April 2022 Round 3	Kildare	2-12 - 1-10	Meath	Kildare COE
	DJ Percival 1-2, R Harris 1-0, J Hanamy 0-3, E Cully 0-2, J Ryan 0-2, J Cunningham 0-1, D Hamill 0-1, TJ Nolan 0-1.		Z Thornton 1-0, O Brennan 0-3, N McGinley 0-2, D Reilly 0-1, J Murphy 0-1, D Kelly 0-1, M McKenna 0-1, C Commins 0-1.

=== Leinster group 3 table ===
Pos	Team	Pld	W	D	L	SF	SA	Diff	Pts
1	Wicklow	2	2	0	0	34	18	16	4
2	Carlow	2	1	0	1	24	22	2	2
3	Wexford	2	0	0	2	12	30	-18	0

=== Leinster group 3 results ===
19 March 2022 Round 1	Carlow	1-08 - 1-04	Wexford	Netwatch Cullen Park
	C Moore 1-0, B Cassidy 0-2, C Healy 0-2, S Duffy 0-1, C Brady 0-1, C Ray 0-1, C Gorman-Comerford 0-1.		D Hills 1-0, C Cullen 0-2, R Martin 0-1, S Doran 0-1.

2 April 2022 Round 2	Wicklow	2-13 - 0-05	Wexford	St. Patrick's Park
	P Kavanagh 1-1, A Kavanagh 0-4, S Byrne 1-0, J McGuckian 0-3, J Kenny 0-3, E Nolan 0-2.		S Doran 0-2, D Bolger 0-1, D Hills 0-1, C Cullen 0-1.

20 April 2022 Round 3	Wicklow	1-12 - 3-04	Carlow	Aughrim County Ground
	A Kavanagh 0-7, P Kavanagh 1-3, E Nolan 0-2.		L Gavin 1-2, C Brady 1-0, L Ryan 1-0, C Healy 0-1, C Gorman-Comerford 0-1.

=== Leinster preliminary quarter-finals ===
27 April 2022 Pre. quarter-final	Westmeath	2-08 - 2-09	Wicklow	TEG Cusack Park
	J Martin 1-2, J Duncan 1-1, S Corcoran 0-2, A Keane 0-1, R Murray 0-1, D McCann 0-1.		A Kavanagh 1-4, J Healy 1-0, E Nolan 0-3, P Kavanagh 0-1, J McGuckian 0-1.

27 April 2022 Pre. quarter-final	Carlow	2-07 - 5-16	Offaly	Netwatch Cullen Park
	L Gavin 0-5 (4f), S Duffy 1-1, C Moore 1-0, S Cormican 0-1.	Report	C Fox 2-2 (1p), L Kelly and D Shirley 1-2 each, N Furlong 0-4 (1f), S Rigney 1-0, C Lowry 0-3 (2f), P McLoughlin, D Thomas, R Kellaghan 0-1 each.

=== Leinster quarter-finals ===
4 May 2022 Quarter-final	Offaly	2-20 - 1-06	Laois	Bord na Móna O'Connor Park
	N Furlong 1-3 (0-3 frees), L Kelly 0-4, D Shirley 0-4, C Fox 0-3, P McLoughlin 1-0, C Lowry 0-2 (frees), S Rigney 0-1, C Bourke 0-1, B Kennedy 0-1, R Kelleghan 0-1 (free).	Report	R Little 1-1, D Costello 0-3 (two frees), A Tarpey 0-1, D Donohue 0-1	Referee: P Coyle (Meath)

4 May 2022 Quarter-final	Longford	0-06 - 0-08	Wicklow	Glennon Brothers Pearse Park
	M Carey (0-2, 2f), M Flynn (0-2, 1f), J Burke (0-1), A Flynn (0-1).	Report	A Kavanagh (0-3, 2f), P Kavanagh (0-2), J Kenny (0-2, 1f), J McGuckian (0-1).	Referee: K O'Brien (Westmeath)

=== Leinster semi-finals ===
11 May 2022 Semi-final	Kildare	2-18 - 0-10	Wicklow	St. Conleth's Park
	K Browne 1-6 (2f), B Loakman 1-1, E Cully 0-4, R Sinkey 0-3, T Kelly, C O’Sullivan, J Harris, N Cramer (f) 0-1 each.	Report	A Kavanagh 0-6 (4f), J Kenny, P Kavanagh, E Nolan, J Boland 0-1 each.

11 May 2022 Semi-final	Dublin	2-13 - 2-04	Offaly	Parnell Park
	J Quigley 1-4 (1-3f), D Mulqueen 1-0, D Clark, C Donovan (1f), L O’Boyle 0-2 each, T Deering, P Reynolds Hand, N Fitzgerald 0-1 each.	Report	N Furlong 1-3 (1-1f), L Kelly 1-0, C Fox 0-1 (sideline).

=== Leinster final ===
18 May 2022 Final	Dublin	2-10 - 0-08	Kildare	MW Hire O'Moore Park
	L O’Boyle 1-1; R Mitchell 1-0; J Quigley 0-3 (2fs), P Reynolds Hand 0-3 (2fs), C Burke 0-2, C McMorrow 0-1.	Report	K Browne 0-7 (6fs, 1 X 45), J Cunningham 0-1.

== Munster Minor Football Championship ==
=== Munster phase 1 group table ===
Key to colours
Advance to phase 1 final

Pos	Team	Pld	W	D	L	SF	SA	Diff	Pts
1	Tipperary	3	3	0	0	68	31	37	6
2	Limerick	3	2	0	1	44	36	8	4
3	Clare	3	1	0	2	50	39	11	2
4	Waterford	3	0	0	3	22	78	-56	0

=== Munster phase 1 group stage ===
14 April 2022 Round 1	Clare	4-18 - 0-04	Waterford	Wolfe Tone Park
	C Talty (1-8, 2f), C Fennell (3-2); D Keane, S McMahon (1f) (0-2 each); C Meaney, E Cahill, C Riordan, T Lysaght (0-1 each).	Report	J Power (0-3f); D Harty (0-1).	Referee: P O'Sullivan (Kerry)

14 April 2022 Round 1	Tipperary	1-15 - 1-08	Limerick	FBD Semple Stadium
	C Grogan(0-8,8fs), F Fitzgerald(1-0), P O Keeffe(0-2), E Ormond, D Hogan, J Higgins, B Carey, T O Connor(0-1 each).	Report	B Smith(1-1), S Young(0-4,3fs), D Hynes(0-2,1f), M Kilbridge(0-1).	Referee: E Morrissey (Waterford)

21 April 2022 Round 2	Waterford	2-03 - 3-20	Tipperary	Páirc Naomh Bríd
	B Byrne, L Kiersey 1-0 each, C Sweeney 0-2 (1f), K Moloney 0-1.	Report	C Grogan 1-5 (5fs), D Hogan 1-3, P O’Keeffe 1-1, C King 0-3 (1f), O Shelly, F Fitzgerald (1f) 0-2 each, T O’Connor, B Carey, C English, D Fogarty 0-1 each.	Referee: P O'Driscoll (Cork)

21 April 2022 Round 2	Limerick	2-08 - 0-09	Clare	Mick Neville Park
	B Smith (1-1), Tommy Ryan (1-0), S Young (0-3, 3f), A O’Shea, D Hynes, L Walsh and E Curry (0-1 each).	Report	S McMahon (0-2, 2f), C Talty (0-2, 2f), Darren Keane (0-2), G O’Shea and C Riordan (0-1 each, C Fennell (0-1, 1f).

28 April 2022 Round 3	Clare	1-08 - 3-12	Tipperary	Wolfe Tone Park
	C Talty (1-5, 1-0 Pen, 3f), S McMahon (0-2, 1f); D Keane (0-1)	Report	F Fitzgerald (1-3, 1f); Conall Grogan (0-4, 2f, 1m); B Carey (1-1); D Hogan (1-0); P O’Keeffe, C English, O Shelly, E Ormond (0-1 each)	Referee: E Ó Muircheartaigh (Kerry)

28 April 2022 Round 3	Waterford	0-09 - 1-16	Limerick	Páirc Naomh Bríd
	A Murray, K Moloney, B Byrne 0-2 each, C McGrath (mark), J Power, C Sweeney (f) 0-1 each.	Report	L Walsh 1-2 (1 mark), S Young 0-4 (2fs), D Hynes 0-3, A O’Shea, T Ryan, B Smith 0-2 each, S O’Sullivan 0-1.	Referee: J O'Regan (Cork)

=== Munster phase 1 final ===
5 May 2022 Phase 1 final	Tipperary	1-14 - 1-04	Limerick	Mallow GAA Complex
	F Fitzgerald (1-1), D Hogan (0-4), C Grogan (0-3 frees), T O’Connor (0-2), O Shelly, J Higgins (free), P O’Keeffe and B Carey (0-1 each).	Report	A O’Shea (1-1), D Hynes (free), T Ryan and B Smith (0-1 each).	Referee: A Long (Cork)

=== Munster semi-finals ===
12 May 2022 Semi-final	Kerry	1-16 - 0-05	Cork	Austin Stack Park
	C Dillon (1-9, 7 frees), P Lane (0-4), J Clifford, J Burke, D Allman (0-1 each)	Report	B Hayes (0-3, frees), O O’Donovan (0-2, 1 free, I mark).	Referee: J Hayes (Limerick)

19 May 2022 Semi-final	Tipperary	1-13 - 3-20	Cork	FBD Semple Stadium
	C Grogan 0-7 (0-6f); D Hogan 1-0; C English 0-3; A Greed 0-2 (0-2f); C King 0-1.	Report	B Hayes 1-5 (0-3f, 0-1’45); E Myers 1-5; O O’Donovan 0-6 (0-1f); A O’Connell 1-0; C Gillespie, G Kearney, S Coakley and B O’Sullivan 0-1 each.	Referee: N Quinn (Clare)

=== Munster final ===
1 June 2022 Final	Cork	3-11 - 0-09	Kerry	Páirc Uí Rinn
	B Hayes 2-3 (2f), A O’Connell 1-2, C Gillespie and E Myers 0-2 (1f) each, D O’Donovan and O O’Donovan 0-1 each.	Report	C Dillon 0-3 (f), P Lane, D O’Sullivan, D Allman (f), J O’Sullivan, I O’Sullivan (f) and D O’Connor 0-1 each.	Referee: N Quinn (Clare)

== Ulster Minor Football Championship ==
=== Ulster preliminary round ===
16 April 2022 Preliminary round	Fermanagh	2-09 - 1-09	Down	Brewster Park
	C O'Brien 1-3, K Fitzpatrick 0-4, T Wray 1-0, M Burns 0-1, C O'Hanlon 0-1.		L Green 1-2, B Grant 0-2, C Gribben 0-2, R Magorrian 0-1, T O'Hanlon 0-1, C McLeod 0-1.

=== Ulster round 1 ===
22 April 2022 Round 1	Monaghan	0-11 - 2-11	Antrim	Grattan Park
	M McGinnity 0-4, T Mallen 0-2, DJ McElvaney 0-2, J Lavelle 0-1, S Arya 0-1, B McCaul 0-1.		K McCann 1-1, C Johnson 0-4, T Enright 1-0, C McAleese 0-3, T McCormick 0-1, J Blaney 0-1, R McErlane 0-1.

23 April 2022 Round 1	Donegal	4-15 - 0-05	Fermanagh	MacCumhaill Park
	D Gildea 2-6, L McGee 1-0, K Lynch 1-0, M Devitt 0-3, F Roarty 0-2, S Martin 0-1, C McMenamin 0-1, K Molloy 0-1, S McLaughin 0-1.		K Fitzpatrick 0-3, C O'Brien 0-1, M McDermott 0-1.

23 April 2022 Round 1	Armagh	2-06 - 5-10	Derry	Athletic Grounds
	D McCloskey (1-4, 2f), O Callaghan (1-0), C O'Neill (0-1), P O'Keefe (0-1).	Report	E Higgins (1-4, 1f ), C Chambers (2-0), R McNicholl (1-1, 1f), D McPeake (1-0), C Spiers (0-2), S Birt (0-2).

23 April 2022 Round 1	Tyrone	3-17 - 1-15	Cavan	O'Neill's Healy Park
	E McElholm (1-6), N Grimes (1-4), C Daly (1-0), C Donnelly (0-3), R McCullagh (0-1), N Farry (0-1), C Donnelly (0-1), M McElhatton (0-1).	Report	M Smith (0-6, 1f, three 45s), C Keaney (1-2), C Galligan (0-2), B Tully (0-2), O McCrystal (0-1), L Reilly (0-1), M Smith (0-1).

=== Ulster round 2 ===
7 May 2022 Round 2	Derry	2-11 - 1-09	Donegal	Owenbeg COE
	O Murphy (1-1, 1-0 pen), R McNicholl (1-0), E Higgins (0-3, 0-1 frees), R Forbes (0-2); C Chambers (0-2, 0-1 frees), F McEldowney (0-1), S Birt (0-1); C Spiers (0-1).	Report	C McMenamin (1-1, 1 pen, 1f); D Gallagher (0-1); L McGee (0-1); C McGinty (0-1), F Roarty (0-1), D Gildea (0-1 free), C McGee (0-1), P Coyle (0-1), K Lynch (0-1).

7 May 2022 Round 2	Antrim	0-05 - 3-17	Tyrone	Corrigan Park
	C McAleese (0-2), T Enright (0-1), C Johnson (0-1), R McErlane (0-1 mark).	Report	N Grimes (0-5, 0-4 frees, 0-1 mark), Caolan Donnelly (1-1); M McElhatton (1-1), C O’Neill (1-0); E McElholm (0-3), Charlie Donnelly (0-2, 0-1 45), R McCullagh (0-2, 0-1 mark), S Fay (0-1), R Molloy (0-1), C Sweeney (0-1).

=== Ulster qualifiers ===
29 April 2022 Round 1	Armagh	1-09 - 0-15	Monaghan	Athletic Grounds
	C O'Neill 1-0, D McCluskey 0-3, A O'Neill 0-2, J Austin 0-2, M McSorley 0-1, K Grant 0-1.	Report	M McGinnity 0-4, F Foy 0-3, E McFarland 0-2, T Mallen 0-2, DJ McElvaney 0-1, P Doogan-Burke 0-1, S Casey 0-1, S O'Connell 0-1.

7 May 2022 Round 2	Fermanagh	3-06 - 0-18	Cavan	Brewster Park
	C O'Brien 1-0, D Boyle 1-0, C McAnespy 1-0, C Brennan 0-1, B Warnock 0-1, T Wray 0-1, M McDermott 0-1, K Fitzpatrick 0-1.		L Reilly 0-9, C Keaney 0-5, Matthew Smith 0-1, Michael Smitj 0-1.

7 May 2022 Round 2	Down	0-12 - 5-13	Monaghan	Páirc Esler
	J Savage (0-7, 0-4 frees), C Gribben (0-3, 0-2 free), B Christie (0-1 free), O Donaldson (0-1).	Report	M McGinnity (2-6, all frees), E McFarland (2-2), DJ McElvaney (1-0), T Mallen (0-3, 1f), O Finnegan (0-1,’45); F Foye (0-1).

14 May 2022 Round 3	Cavan	1-16 - 0-13	Antrim	Kingspan Breffni Park
	C Keaney 0-5, C Mooney 1-0, M Smith 0-3, B Tully 0-2, L Reilly 0-2, C Callaghan 0-1, K McCabe 0-1, O McCrystal 0-1.		C Johnson 0-7, C McAleese 0-2, P Duffin 0-1, T McCormack 0-1, S Boyd 0-1.

14 May 2022 Round 3	Monaghan	3-07 - 4-12	Donegal	St. Tiernach's Park
	M McGinnity 2-4, B McCaul 1-0, T Mallon 0-2, E McFarland 0-1.		KJ Molloy 1-3, D Gildea 1-2, C McGinty 1-1, C McGee 1-0, C McMenamin 0-2, L McGee 0-1, M McDevitt 0-1, S Martin 0-1, S McLaughlin 0-1.

=== Ulster semi-finals ===
21 May 2022 Semi-final	Derry	0-16 - 0-11	Cavan	Athletic Grounds
	C Chambers (0-4, 2f), E Higgins (0-3, 2f), R Forbes (0-3), J McGuckan (0-2), C Spiers (0-1), C Higgins (0-1), O Crozier (0-1, 1 ’45’), D McPeake (0-1),	Report	M Smith (0-2, 1f), L Reilly (0-2, 2f), O McChrystal (0-2), N Magee (0-2), B Tully (0-1), C Keaney (0-1), M Smith (0-1).

21 May 2022 Semi-final	Tyrone	0-13 - 1-10 (aet); 4-3 penalties	Donegal	Celtic Park
	N Grimes (0-3,1f), E McElholm (0-2), C Daly (0-2), M McElhatton (0-2), S Hughes (0-1), R Molloy (0-1), C Devlin (0-1), N McCarney (0-1).	Report	KJ Molloy (0-4,3f), D Gallagher (1-0), M McDevitt (0-2), C McMenamin (0-2f), C McGee (0-1), S Callaghan (0-1).

=== Ulster final ===
29 May 2022 Final	Tyrone	4-08 - 0-16	Derry	St. Tiernach's Park
	E McElholm 2-2; R Molloy 1-1; C Donnelly 1-0; M McElhatton 0-2; N Grimes, S Hughes (f), R McCullagh 0-1 each.	Report	E Higgins 0-7 (7f); C Spiers, O Murphy, C Chambers (1f) 0-2 each; J McGuckian, S Birt, O Crozier (’45) 0-1 each.	Referee: P Clarke (Cavan)

== All-Ireland Minor Football Championship ==
=== All-Ireland quarter-finals ===
11 June 2022 Quarter-final	Tyrone	1-04 - 0-08	Kerry	MW Hire O'Moore Park
	C Donnelly 1-1; R Molloy 0-2 (1f), N Grimes 0-1.	Report	C Dillon 0-3 (1m), F Murphy 0-1 (‘45’); J Clifford 0-1; E Healy 0-1, P Lane 0-1, D O’Sullivan 0-1.

11 June 2022 Quarter-final	Cork	0-06 - 0-12	Derry	MW Hire O'Moore Park
	B Hayes 0-3 (0-2 f), C Gillespie 0-2, O O’Donovan 0-1.	Report	C Chambers 0-4 (0-3 f), O Murphy 0-2, O Crozier 0-2 (0-1 45, 0-1 f), E Higgins 0-2 (0-1 f), S Birt, R Forbes 0-1 each.	Referee: P Maguire (Longford)

12 June 2022 Quarter-final	Mayo	3-18 - 3-12	Kildare	Bord na Móna O'Connor Park
	N Hurley 2-4 (0-1m), R Clarke 1-6 (0-4f), O Armstrong 0-4, L Feeney 0-1, J Maheady 0-1, D Hurley 0-1, Z Collins 0-1.	Report	B Loakman 2-2 (1-0 pen, 0-1f), E Cully 1-4 (0-1m), J Cunningham 0-2, K Browne 0-1f, R Sinkey 0-1, B Ryan 0-1, DJ Percival 0-1.	Referee: B Tiernan (Dublin)

12 June 2022 Quarter-final	Dublin	0-07 - 0-10	Galway	Bord na Móna O'Connor Park
	J Quigley 0-3, P Donohue 0-2, L O’Boyle 0-1, C Burke 0-1.	Report	F O’Connor 0-2, J Lonergan 0-1, S McGlinchey 0-1, É Monaghan 0-1f, S Dunne 0-1, C Costello 0-1, O Morgan 0-1, T Farthing 0-1, O Kelly 0-1.	Referee: D Murnane (Cork)

=== All-Ireland semi-finals ===
25 June 2022 Semi-final	Mayo	1-08 - 0-09	Kerry	Bord na Móna O'Connor Park
	R Clarke 1-3 (0-3f), C Keaveney 0-2 (0-1f), J Maheady 0-1 D Hurley 0-1, J Keane 0-1.	Report	D O’Sullivan 0-2, C Dillon 0-2 (0-1f), P Lane 0-2 (0-1f), D O’Connor (Kenmare, 0-1), O Ferris 0-1, D O’Connor (Beaufort, 0-1).

25/26 June 2022 Semi-final	Galway	2-09 - 1-11	Derry	Parnell Park
	C Costello (1-4, 2f), E Monaghan (0-4), J Lonergan (1-0), S McGlinchey (0-1)	Report	E Higgins (1-1, 1f), C Chambers (0-6, 4f), R Forbes (0-1), J McGuckian (0-1), C Downey (0-1), C Spiers (0-1)

=== All-Ireland final ===
8 July 2022 Final	Mayo	0-09 - 0-15	Galway	Dr Hyde Park
	R Clarke (0-4), J Maheady (0-3), C Keaveney (0-1), C McHale (0-1).	Report	E Monaghan (0-5), C Costello (0-4), S Curley (0-2); F O'Connor (0-1), C Trayers (0-1), S McGlinchey (0-1); O Morgan (0-1).	Attendance: 12,789; Referee: N Cullen (Fermanagh)

== Championship statistics ==
=== Top scorers ===
Overall

Rank	Player	Club	Tally	Total	Matches	Average
1	Ronan Clarke	Mayo	3-43	52	8	6.5-
2	Éanna Monaghan	Galway	3-32	41	8	5.12
3	Colm Costello	Galway	2-33	39	9	4.33
4	Joe Quigley	Dublin	3-28	37	6	6.16
5	Max McGinnity	Monaghan	4-18	30	4	7.50
5	Conall Grogan	Tipperary	1-27	30	5	6.00
7	Niall Hurley	Mayo	3-20	29	8	3.625
8	Alex Kavanagh	Wicklow	1-24	27	5	5.40
9	Killian Browne	Kildare	2-20	26	5	5.20
9	Eoin Higgins	Derry	2-20	26	6	4.33

In a single game

Rank	Player	Club	Tally	Total	Opposition
1	Ryan Little	Laois	2-06	12	Louth
1	Daithí Gildea	Donegal	2-06	12	Fermanagh
1	Max McGinnity	Monaghan	2-06	12	Down
1	Cormac Dillon	Kerry	1-09	12	Cork
1	Éanna Monaghan	Galway	1-09	12	Sligo
6	Conor Fennell	Clare	3-02	11	Waterford
6	Cathal Talty	Clare	1-08	11	Waterford
6	Ronan Clarke	Mayo	1-08	11	Leitrim
6	Joe Quigley	Dublin	1-08	11	Laois
10	Max McGinnity	Monaghan	2-04	10	Donegal
10	Niall Hurley	Mayo	2-04	10	Kildare
10	Paul Honeyman	Leitirm	1-07	10	Sligo
