= All-Ireland Minor Football Championship =

Under-17 "knockout" competition in Gaelic football

- Current season or competition: 2026 All-Ireland Minor Football Championship
- Code: Football
- Founded: 1929
- Region: Ireland (GAA)
- Trophy: Tom Markham Cup
- Title holders: Cork (12th title)
- Most titles: Kerry (16 titles)
- Sponsors: Electric Ireland
- TV partner: TG4
- Motto: There's No Next Year When It's Minor

The Electric Ireland All-Ireland Minor Football Championship is the premier under-17 "knockout" competition in Gaelic football played in Ireland. The tournament was for players under the age of 18 until 2017, following a vote at the GAA congress on 26 February 2016.

The series of games is organised by the Gaelic Athletic Association and is played during the summer months. Historically the All-Ireland Minor Football Final was played in Croke Park, Dublin as the curtain-raiser to the senior final, but in recent years with shifts to scheduling and a desire to market the competition separately the minor final is held at a neutral county ground several weeks prior to the senior final. A unique element of the minor final is that, as a rule, it has always been televised exclusively in the Irish language.

The winners receive the Tom Markham Cup, which is named in honour of former Clare figure Tom Markham.

== Overview ==
Players are eligible to play in the All-Ireland Minor Championship if they were under the age of 17 on 1 January of the competition year. The first minor championship was played in 1929 when Clare were crowned the champions. The championship has been held every year since then except for a period during 'The Emergency'.

Kerry are the most successful team in minor football with 16 titles in total, closely followed on the winners list by Cork on 12 and Dublin on 11. Kerry also won an unequalled five-in-a-row from 2014 to 2018. Three teams have achieved three-in-a-rows – Kerry from 1931 to 1933; Cork from 1967 to 1969; and Dublin from 1954 to 1956. The coveted treble of winning senior, under-21 and minor titles in the same year has been achieved on just one occasion, by Kerry in 1975.

Because teams will only play together for at most two or three years, unlike the senior competition, it is unusual that one county will dominate for periods any longer than this.

== Wins listed by county ==
	Team	Wins	Years won	Runners-up	Years runners-up
1	Kerry	16	1931, 1932, 1933, 1946, 1950, 1962, 1963, 1975, 1980, 1988, 1994, 2014, 2015, 2016, 2017, 2018	14	1936, 1938, 1949, 1954, 1965, 1970, 1979, 1982, 1990, 1996, 2004, 2006, 2020, 2025
2	Cork	12	1961, 1967, 1968, 1969, 1972, 1974, 1981, 1991, 1993, 2000, 2019, 2026	9	1960, 1964, 1971, 1976, 1983, 1985, 1986, 1987, 2010
3	Dublin	11	1930, 1945, 1954, 1955, 1956, 1958, 1959, 1979, 1982, 1984, 2012	7	1946, 1948, 1978, 1988, 2001, 2003, 2011
4	Tyrone	9	1947, 1948, 1973, 1998, 2001, 2004, 2008, 2010, 2025	6	1972, 1975, 1997, 2013, 2021, 2026
5	Mayo	7	1935, 1953, 1966, 1971, 1978, 1985, 2013	15	1930, 1933, 1940, 1947, 1958, 1961, 1962, 1974, 1991, 1999, 2000, 2005, 2008, 2009, 2022
5	Derry	7	1965, 1983, 1989, 2002, 2020, 2023, 2024	6	1969, 1980, 1981, 1995, 2007, 2017
5	Galway	7	1952, 1960, 1970, 1976, 1986, 2007, 2022	4	1994, 2016, 2018, 2019
8	Meath	4	1957, 1990, 1992, 2021	4	1977, 1993, 2002, 2012
8	Down	4	1977, 1987, 1999, 2005	1	1966
8	Roscommon	4	1939, 1941, 1951, 2006	0	—N/a
11	Laois	3	1996, 1997, 2003	3	1932, 1967, 1998
12	Tipperary	2	1934, 2011	4	1935, 1955, 1984, 2015
12	Armagh	2	1949, 2009	4	1951, 1957, 1992, 2024
12	Cavan	2	1937, 1938	2	1952, 1959
12	Louth	2	1936, 1940	2	1931, 1941
16	Offaly	1	1964	1	1989
16	Westmeath	1	1995	1	1963
16	Clare	1	1929	1	1953
19	Wexford	0	—N/a	2	1937, 1950
19	Leitrim	0	—N/a	2	1945, 1956
19	Monaghan	0	—N/a	2	1939, 2023
19	Longford	0	—N/a	1	1929
19	Sligo	0	—N/a	1	1968
19	Kildare	0	—N/a	1	1973
19	Donegal	0	—N/a	1	2014

== Wins listed by province ==
	Province	Wins	Last Win	Contributors
1	Munster	31	2026 (Cork)	Kerry (16), Cork (12), Tipperary (2), Clare (1)
2	Ulster	25	2025 (Tyrone)	Tyrone (10), Derry (7), Down (4), Armagh (2), Cavan (2)
3	Leinster	22	2021 (Meath)	Dublin (11), Meath (4), Laois (3), Louth (2), Offaly (1), Westmeath (1)
4	Connacht	18	2022 (Galway)	Mayo (7), Galway (7), Roscommon (4)

The following counties have never won an All Ireland minor football title:

Province	County (Last final)
Leinster	Kildare, Kilkenny, Wexford, Longford, Carlow, Wicklow
Connacht	Leitrim, Sligo
Ulster	Antrim, Donegal, Fermanagh, Monaghan
Munster	Limerick, Waterford

== Finals listed by year ==
Under-17 Competition
Year	Winner	Score	Opponent	Score
2026	Cork	2-16	Tyrone	1-16
2025	Tyrone	1-16	Kerry	1-15
2024	Derry	2-7	Armagh	0-10
2023	Derry	1-13	Monaghan	0-09
2022	Galway	0-15	Mayo	0-09
2021	Meath	1-12	Tyrone	1-11
2020	Derry	2-12	Kerry	1-14
2019	Cork	3–20	Galway	3–14
2018	Kerry	0–21	Galway	1–14
Under-18 Competition
Year	Winner	Score	Opponent	Score
2017	Kerry	6–17	Derry	1–08
2016	Kerry	3–07	Galway	0–09
2015	Kerry	4–14	Tipperary	0–06
2014	Kerry	0–17	Donegal	1–10
2013	Mayo	2–13	Tyrone	1–13
2012	Dublin	0–14	Meath	1–05
2011	Tipperary	3–09	Dublin	1–14
2010	Tyrone	1–13	Cork	1–12
2009	Armagh	0–10	Mayo	0–07
2008	Tyrone	0–14, 1–20 (R)	Mayo	0–14, 1–15 (R)
2007	Galway	1–10	Derry	1–09
2006	Roscommon	0–15, 1–10 (R)	Kerry	0–15, 0–09 (R)
2005	Down	1–15	Mayo	0–08
2004	Tyrone	0–12	Kerry	0–10
2003	Laois	1–11, 2–10 (R)	Dublin	1–11, 1–09 (R)
2002	Derry	1–12	Meath	0–08
2001	Tyrone	0–15, 2–11 (R)	Dublin	1–12, 0–06 (R)
2000	Cork	2–12	Mayo	0–13
1999	Down	1–14	Mayo	0–14
1998	Tyrone	2–11	Laois	0–11
1997	Laois	3–11	Tyrone	1–14
1996	Laois	2–11	Kerry	1–11
1995	Westmeath	1–10	Derry	0–11
1994	Kerry	0–16	Galway	1–07
1993	Cork	2–07	Meath	0–09
1992	Meath	2–05	Armagh	0–10
1991	Cork	1–09	Mayo	1–07
1990	Meath	2–11	Kerry	2–09
1989	Derry	3–09	Offaly	1–06
1988	Kerry	2–05	Dublin	0–05
1987	Down	1–12	Cork	1–05
1986	Galway	3–08	Cork	2–07
1985	Mayo	3–03	Cork	0–09
1984	Dublin	1–09	Tipperary	0–04
1983	Derry	0–08	Cork	1–03
1982	Dublin	1–11	Kerry	1–05
1981	Cork	4–09	Derry	2–07
1980	Kerry	3–12	Derry	0–11
1979	Dublin	0–10	Kerry	1–06
1978	Mayo	4–09	Dublin	3–08
1977	Down	2–06	Meath	0–04
1976	Galway	1–10	Cork	0–06
1975	Kerry	1–10	Tyrone	0–04
1974	Cork	1–10	Mayo	1–06
1973	Tyrone	2–11	Kildare	1–06
1972	Cork	3–11	Tyrone	2–11
1971	Mayo	2–15	Cork	2–07
1970	Galway	1–08, 1–11 (R)	Kerry	2–05, 1–10 (R)
1969	Cork	2–07	Derry	0–11
1968	Cork	3–05	Sligo	1–10
1967	Cork	5–14	Laois	2–03
1966	Mayo	1–12	Down	1–08
1965	Derry	2–08	Kerry	2–04
1964	Offaly	0–15	Cork	1–11
1963	Kerry	1–10	Westmeath	0–02
1962	Kerry	6–05	Mayo	0–07
1961	Cork	3–07	Mayo	0–05
1960	Galway	4–09	Cork	1–05
1959	Dublin	0–11	Cavan	1–04
1958	Dublin	2–10	Mayo	0–08
1957	Meath	3–09	Armagh	0–04
1956	Dublin	5–14	Leitrim	2–02
1955	Dublin	4–04	Tipperary	2–07
1954	Dublin	3–03	Kerry	1–08
1953	Mayo	2–11	Clare	1–06
1952	Galway	2–09	Cavan	1–06
1951	Roscommon	2–07	Armagh	1–05
1950	Kerry	3–06	Wexford	1–04
1949	Armagh	1–07	Kerry	1–05
1948	Tyrone	0–11	Dublin	1–05
1947	Tyrone	4–04	Mayo	4–03
1946	Kerry	3–07	Dublin	2–03
1945	Dublin	4–07	Leitrim	0–04
1944	No Championship			
1943	No Championship			
1942	No Championship			
1941	Roscommon	3–06	Louth	0–07
1940	Louth	5–05	Mayo	2–07
1939	Roscommon	1–09	Monaghan	1–07
1938	Cavan	3–03	Kerry	0–08
1937	Cavan	1–11	Wexford	1–05
1936	Louth	5–01	Kerry	1–08
1935	Mayo	1–06	Tipperary	1–01
1934	Tipperary *			
1933	Kerry	4–01	Mayo	0–09
1932	Kerry	3–08	Laois	1–03
1931	Kerry	3–04	Louth	0–04
1930	Dublin	1–03	Mayo	0–05
1929	Clare	5–03	Longford	3–05

- 1934 Semi-finalists Dublin and Tyrone were disqualified – Tipperary were awarded the title

== Sources ==
- Roll of Honour on www.gaainfo.com
- Complete Roll of Honour on Kilkenny GAA bible
