= 1929 All-Ireland Minor Football Championship =

Gaelic football competition

Championship details

All-Ireland Champions
- Winning team: Clare (1st win)
- Captain: George Comerford

All-Ireland Finalists
- Losing team: Longford

Provincial Champions
- Munster: Clare
- Leinster: Longford

The 1929 All-Ireland Minor Football Championship was the inaugural staging of the All-Ireland Minor Football Championship, the Gaelic Athletic Association's premier inter-county Gaelic football tournament for boys under the age of 18.

Clare won the championship following a 5-3 to 3-5 defeat of Longford in the All-Ireland final. It remains their only All-Ireland title in this grade.

== Results ==
=== All-Ireland Minor Football Championship ===
Semi-finals

Final

1929 Clare 5–03 Longford 3–05
