= 2026 National Football League (Ireland) =

2026 Gaelic football competition in Ireland and London

League details
- Dates: 24 January – 29 March 2026
- Teams: 32

League champions
- Winners: Donegal (2nd win)
- Captain: Michael Langan & Shane O'Donnell
- Manager: Jim McGuinness

League runners-up
- Runners-up: Kerry
- Captain: Paul Geaney
- Manager: Jack O'Connor

Other division winners
- Division 2: Meath
- Division 3: Down
- Division 4: Carlow

The 2026 National Football League, known for sponsorship reasons as the Allianz Football League, was the 95th staging of the National Football League (NFL), an annual Gaelic football tournament for county teams. Thirty-one county teams from Ireland, plus London, competed. Kilkenny do not compete in senior football.

== Format ==
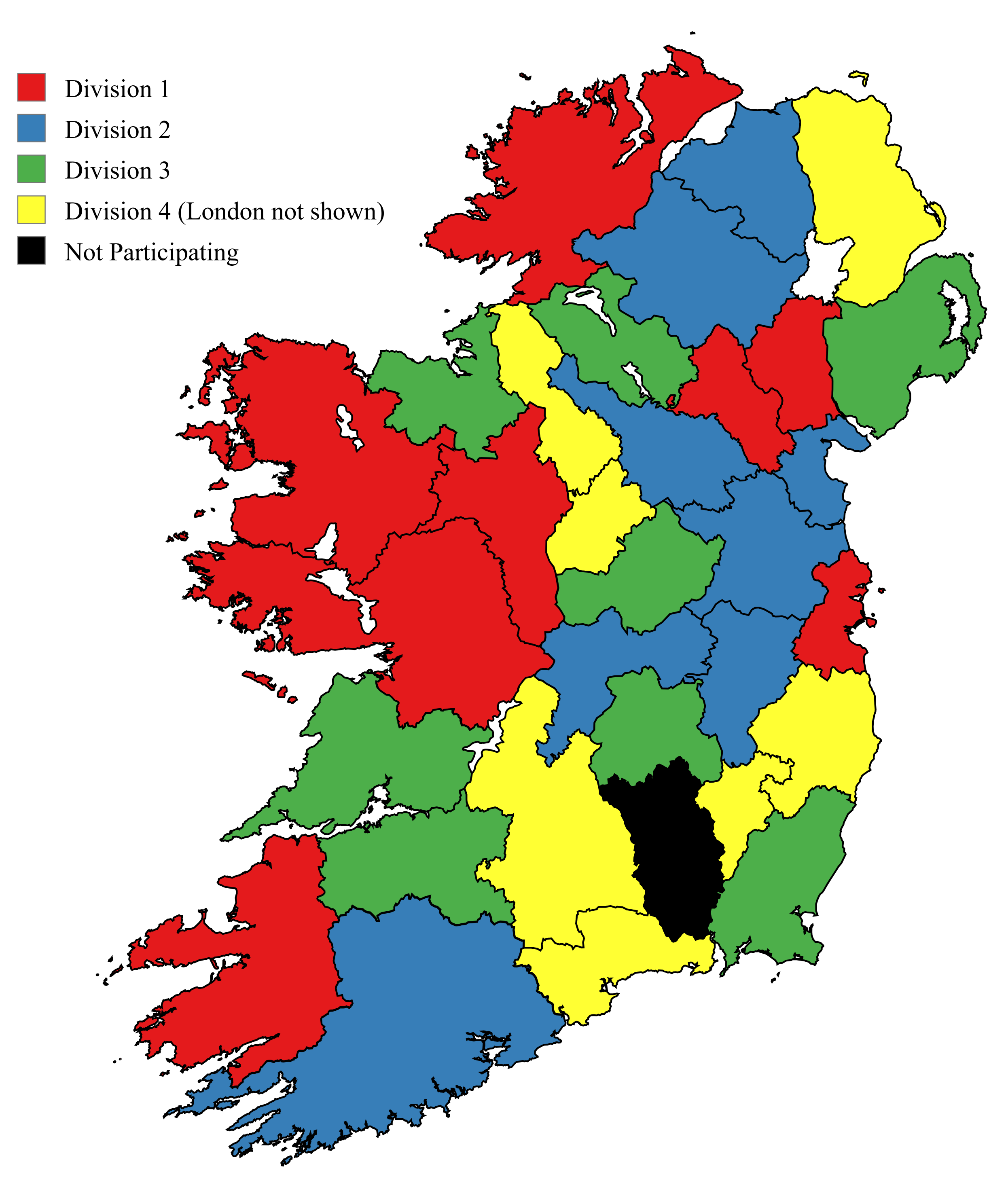
Map showing the leagues in which each county will participate

=== League structure ===
Teams by Province and Division
Province	Division 1	Division 2	Division 3	Division 4	Total
Connacht	3	0	1	1	5
Leinster	1	4	3	3	11
Munster	1	1	2	2	6
Ulster	3	3	2	1	9
England	0	0	0	1	1
Total	8	8	8	8	32

The 2026 National Football League consists of four divisions of eight teams. Each team plays every other team in its division once. Two points are awarded for a win, one point is awarded for a draw and none are awarded for a loss.

In the top division, Division 1, teams compete to become the National Football League (NFL) champions. The top two teams qualify for the NFL Final, with the winners crowned NFL champions.

Teams compete for promotion and relegation to a higher or lower league. In Divisions 2, 3 and 4, the first and second-places teams are promoted and play in the respective divisional finals, while the bottom two teams of divisions 1, 2 and 3 are relegated.

=== Tiebreakers for league ranking ===
As per the Official GAA Guide - Part 1 - Section 6.21 -

If two teams in the same group are equal on points on completion of the league phase, the following tie-breaking criteria are applied:

1. Where two teams only are involved - the outcome of the meeting of the two teams in the previous game in the Competition;

If three or more teams in the same group are equal on points on completion of the league phase, the following tie-breaking criteria are applied:

1. Scoring Difference (subtracting the total scores against from total scores for);
2. Highest Total Score For;
3. A Play-Off.

In the event that two teams or more finish with equal points, but have been affected by a disqualification, loss of game on a proven objection, retirement or walkover, the tie shall be decided by the following means:

1. Score Difference from the games in which only the teams involved, (teams tied on points), have played each other. (subtracting the total Scores Against from total Scores For)
2. Highest Total Score For, in which only the teams involved, have played each other, and have finished equal in (i)
3. A Play-Off

== Division 1 ==
Locations of the 2026 NFL Division 1 teams

=== Table ===
Pos	Team	Pld	W	D	L	PF	PA	PD	Pts	Qualification
1	Donegal	7	5	1	1	162	145	+17	11	Advance to NFL Final
2	Kerry (Note: Kerry are ranked ahead of Mayo as they won the head-to-head game between the two teams.)	7	4	2	1	167	134	+33	10	Advance to NFL Final
3	Mayo	7	5	0	2	178	152	+26	10	
4	Roscommon (Note: Roscommon are ranked ahead of Galway as they won the head-to-head game between the two teams.)	7	4	0	3	153	170	−17	8	
5	Galway	7	3	2	2	152	145	+7	8	
6	Armagh	7	2	1	4	169	164	+5	5	
7	Dublin	7	2	0	5	139	143	−4	4	Relegation to 2027 NFL Division 2
8	Monaghan	7	0	0	7	118	185	−67	0	Relegation to 2027 NFL Division 2

Source: GAA.ie
Rules for classification: Tiebreakers

==== Round 1 ====
24 January 2026 Round 1	Dublin	0-20 (20) – (23) 1-20	Donegal	Dublin
17:00 GMT (UTC+0)		(HT: 0-6 - 1-9)		Venue: Croke Park
	Pts: Con O'Callaghan 0-8 (1tp, 1tpf, 1'45, 2f), Luke Breathnach 0-5, Nathan Doran 0-2, Paddy Small 0-2, Conor Tyrrell 0-2, Seán Bugler 0-1	Report	Pts: Michael Langan 0-6 (1tp, 1tpf, 1f), Gavin Mulreany 0-4 (2tpf), Daire Ó Baoill 0-3 (1tp), Shea Malone 1-0, Conor O'Donnell 0-2, Ryan McHugh 0-1, Shane O'Donnell 0-1, Finnbarr Roarty 0-1, Jason McGee 0-1, Caolan McConagle 0-1	Referee: Noel Mooney (Cavan); Attendance: 23,707

25 January 2026 Round 1	Galway	2-18 (24) – (27) 3-18	Mayo	Galway
13:45 GMT (UTC+0)		(HT: 0-9 - 1-12)		Venue: Pearse Stadium
	Gls: Fionn McDonagh, Shane McGrath; Pts: Finnian O Laoi, Kieran Molloy, Ciaran Mulhern 3 (1 tp), Daniel O'Flaherty, Fionn McDonagh 4, Robert Finnerty 5, Oisin McDonagh 3 (1 tp)	Report	Gls: Darragh Beirne, Aidan O'Shea; Pts: Rob Hennelly 6 (3 tp), Jack Carney, Ryan O'Donoghue 7 (2 tp), Jordan Flynn 2, Darragh Beirne, Fergal Boland	Referee: Conor Lane (Cork); Attendance: 11,515

25 January 2026 Round 1	Kerry	2-18 (24) – (23) 1-20	Roscommon	Killarney
14:00 GMT (UTC+0)		(HT: 1-9 - 1-6)		Venue: Fitzgerald Stadium
	Gls: David Clifford (pen), Tomás Kennedy; Pts: Armin Heinrich, Tadhg Morley, Joe O'Connor, Seán O'Shea, Micheál Burns 2, David Clifford 8 (1 tp), Tomás Kennedy 3, Tony Brosnan	Report	Gls: Diarmuid Murtagh; Pts: Keith Doyle, Enda Smith, Diarmuid Murtagh 6 (2 tp), Daire Cregg 9 (1 tp), Eoin Colleran, Jack Duggan 2	Referee: Brendan Cawley (Kildare); Attendance: 6,427

25 January 2026 Round 1	Monaghan	0-18 (18) – (30) 1-27	Armagh	Clones
14:00 GMT (UTC+0)		(HT: 0-4 - 0-15)		Venue: St Tiernach's Park
	Pts: Dylan Byrne, Daragh McElearney, Thomas Hughes, Karl Gallagher, Mícheál Bannigan 2, Andrew Woods 4 (1 tp), Stephen O’Hanlon 7 (2 tp), Eddie Walsh	Report	Gls: Andrew Murnin; Pts: Greg McCabe 2, Tiernan Kelly, Jarly Óg Burns 3, Callum O’Neill 2, Andrew Murnin 3, Joe McElroy, Conor Turbitt 6, Cian McConville 3, Oisín O'Neill 3, Oisín Conaty 2, Ross McQuillan	Referee: Paul Faloon (Down); Attendance: 74,761

==== Round 2 ====
31 January 2026 Round 2	Armagh	0-20 (20) – (21) 3-12	Galway	Armagh
17:00 GMT (UTC+0)		(HT: 0-10 - 2-5)		Venue: Athletic Grounds
	Pts: Oisín O'Neill 0-6 (1tpf, 1f), Ross McQuillan 0-3, Jarly Óg Burns 0-3, Cian McConville 0-2 (1f), Oisín Conaty 0-2, Tiernan Kelly 0-1, Fergal O'Brien 0-1, Conor Turbitt 0-1, Jason Duffy 0-1	Report	Pts: Robert Finnerty 1-6 (3f), Kieran Molloy 1-0, Matthew Tierney 1-0, Finnian O'Laoi 0-1, Fionn McDonagh 0-1, Cillian McDaid 0-1, Shaw McGlinchey 0-1, Shane Walsh 0-1, Shane McGrath 0-1	Referee: Barry Cassidy (Derry); Attendance: 7,532

1 February 2026 Round 2	Donegal	1-22 (25) – (21) 1-18	Kerry	Ballyshannon
13:30 GMT (UTC+0)		(HT: 1-9 - 0-8)		Venue: Father Tierney Park
	Pts: Daire Ó Baoill 1-2, Michael Langan 0-4 (2tp), Conor O'Donnell 0-3 (1f), Finnbarr Roarty 0-3, Hugh McFadden 0-2 (tp), Peadar Mogan 0-2, Ciarán Moore 0-2, Michael Murphy 0-2 (1f), Gavin Mulreany 0-1 ('45), Shea Malone 0-1	Report	Pts: Sean O'Shea 0-11 (4tpf, 1f, 1'45), Tony Brosnan 0-6 (2tp, 1f), Donagh O'Sullivan 1-0, Armin Heinrich 0-1	Referee: David Coldrick (Meath); Attendance: 9,000

1 February 2026 Round 2	Mayo	1-18 (21) – (15) 2-09	Dublin	Castlebar
13:30 GMT (UTC+0)		(HT: 0-10 - 1-5)		Venue: MacHale Park
	Pts: Ryan O'Donoghue 0-5 (1tp, 1f), Darragh Beirne 1-1, David McBrien 0-3 (1tp), Sam Callinan 0-2, Fergal Boland 0-2, Stephen Coen 0-1, Jack Carney 0-1, Jordan Flynn 0-1, Cian McHale 0-1 (f), Diarmuid O'Connor 0-1	Report	Pts: Cormac Costello 0-5 (1tp, 1f, 1'45), Paddy Small 1-1, Luke Breathnach 1-0, Killian McGinnis 0-1, Jack Lundy 0-1, Seán Bugler 0-1	Referee: Martin McNally (Monaghan); Attendance: 15,197

1 February 2026 Round 2	Roscommon	3-16 (25) – (19) 1-16	Monaghan	Roscommon
14:00 GMT (UTC+0)		(HT: 1-6 - 1-8)		Venue: Dr Hyde Park
	Pts: Enda Smith 2-2 (1 pen), Diarmuid Murtagh 2-5 (1f, 1tpf), Daire Cregg 0-4 (2f), Darragh Heneghan 0-2, Dylan Ruane 0-2, Paul Carey 0-1	Report	Pts: Michael Bannigan 0-5 (1tp), Louis Kelly 1-1, Eddie Walsh 0-2 (tp), Andrew Woods 0-2 (1f), Rory Beggan 0-1 ('45), Ryan McAnespie 0-1, Gary Mohan 0-1, Dessie Ward 0-1, Stephen O'Hanlon 0-1, Stephen Mooney 0-1	Referee: Sean Hurson (Tyrone)

==== Round 3 ====
14 February 2026 Round 3	Kerry	2-17 (23) – (23) 3-14	Galway	Tralee
17:00 GMT (UTC+0)		(HT: 2-10 - 1-3)		Venue: Austin Stack Park
	Pts: David Clifford 1-6 (2tp), Micheal Burns 1-2, Cillian Trant 0-3, Keith Evans 0-2, Dylan Casey 0-2, Tony Brosnan 0-1, Joe O'Connor 0-1	Report	Pts: Matthew Tierney 1-4 (1tpf), Shane McGrath 0-5 (2tp), Cian Hernon 1-0, John Maher 1-0, Oisin Mac Donnacha 0-2 (tp), Finnian O Laoi 0-1, Daniel O Flaherty 0-1, Dylan McHugh 0-1	Referee: Paul Faloon (Down)

14 February 2026 Round 3	Dublin	1-18 (21) – (17) 0-17	Monaghan	Dublin
19:00 GMT (UTC+0)		(HT: 0-7 - 0-7)		Venue: Croke Park
	Pts: Con O'Callaghan 0-8 (2tp, 2f, 1'45), Joe Quigley 1-0, Seán Bugler 0-3, Ciarán Kilkenny 0-2, Luke Breathnach 0-1, Nathan Doran 0-1, Ross McGarry 0-1, Greg McEneaney	Report	Pts: Dessie Ward 0-4 (1tp), Micheal Bannigan 0-3 (1f), Rory Beggan 0-3 (1tpf, 1'45), Aaron Carey 0-3, Oisin McGorman 0-1, Ryan McAnespie 0-1, Andrew Woods 0-1, Ryan Wylie 0-1	Referee: Liam Devenney (Mayo)

15 February 2026 Round 3	Donegal	1-19 (22) – (14) 0-14	Mayo	Letterkenny
13:40 GMT (UTC+0)		(HT: 0-11 - 0-5)		Venue: O'Donnell Park
	Pts: Conor O'Donnell 1-4, Oisín Gallen 0-6 (2f), Conor McCahill 0-3, Ryan McHugh 0-3 (1tp), Finnbarr Roarty 0-1, Shane O'Donnell 0-1, Ciarán Moore 0-1	Report	Pts: Ryan O'Donoghue 0-4 (1f, 1tpf), Jordan Flynn 0-2, Darragh Beirne 0-2, Sam Callinan 0-2, Bob Tuohy 0-1, Conor Loftus 0-1, Enda Hession 0-1, Fergal Boland 0-1	Referee: Sean Hurson (Tyrone); Attendance: 8,900

15 February 2026 Round 3	Roscommon	3-18 (27) – (24) 0-24	Armagh	Roscommon
14:00 GMT (UTC+0)		(HT: 2-14 - 0-8)		Venue: Dr Hyde Park
	Pts: Diarmuid Murtagh 1-7 (1tpf, 2tp, 1f), Daire Cregg 0-6 (1tp, 2f), Enda Smith 1-2, Paul Carey 1-0, Robert Heneghan 0-1, Darragh Heneghan 0-1, Aaron Brady 0-1 ('45)	Report	Pts: Oisin O'Neill 0-7 (1f, 1tp, 1tpf), Cian McConville 0-5 (2f, 1tp), Ross McQuillan 0-3, Greg McCabe 0-3, Andrew Murnin 0-2 (tp), Callum O'Neill 0-1, Tiernan Kelly 0-1, Gareth Murphy 0-1, Tomas McCormack 0-1	Referee: Niall Cullen (Fermanagh); Attendance: 6,317

==== Round 4 ====
21 February 2026 Round 4	Dublin	1-10 (13) – (19) 1-16	Kerry	Dublin
19:00 GMT (UTC+0)		(HT: 0-6 - 0-9)		Venue: Croke Park
	Pts: Peadar Ó Cofaigh Byrne 1-0, Con O'Callaghan 0-3 (2f, 1'45), Paddy Small 0-3 (1tp), Ciarán Kilkenny 0-2 (tp), Ross McGarry 0-1, Niall Scully 0-1	Report	Pts: Tony Brosnan 1-2, David Clifford 0-4 (1tp, 1f), Seán O'Shea 0-4 (2tp), Tom O'Sullivan 0-2, Cillian Trant 0-1, Graham O'Sullivan 0-1, Tadhg Morley 0-1, Paudie Clifford 0-1	Referee: Paddy Neilan (Roscommon); Attendance: 25,027

21 February 2026 Round 4	Galway	0-21 (21) – (22) 2-16	Roscommon	Galway
19:00 GMT (UTC+0)		(HT: 0-16 - 0-5)		Venue: Pearse Stadium
	Pts: Liam O Conghaile 0-6 (2tp), Robert Finnerty 0-4, Seán Kelly 0-3, Matthew Tierney 0-3 (1tp), John Maher 0-2, Shane McGrath 0-2, Dylan McHugh 0-1	Report	Pts: Daire Cregg 1-7 (2f), Diarmuid Murtagh 0-5 (1tp, 1f), Enda Smith 1-0, Dylan Ruane 0-2 (tp), Ciaran Lennon 0-1, Aaron Brady 0-1 ('45)	Referee: David Coldrick (Meath); Attendance: 6,043

22 February 2026 Round 4	Monaghan	2-11 (17) – (36) 2-30	Mayo	Clones
13:45 GMT (UTC+0)		(HT: 0-6 - 0-17)		Venue: St Tiernach's Park
	Pts: Jack McCarron 1-2 (1f), Micheal Bannigan 0-4 (1f), Robbie Hanratty 1-0, Stephen O'Hanlon 0-2 (tp), Andrew Woods 0-2 (1f), Micheal McCarville 0-1	Report	Pts: Kobe McDonald 1-4 (1tp), Darragh Beirne 0-5 (1tpf, 1f), Fergie Boland 0-5 (2tp), Jordan Flynn 0-5 (1tp), Aidan O'Shea 1-1, Ryan O'Donoghue 0-4 (1f), Jack Carney 0-2 (tp), Paddy Durcan 0-2, Sam Callinan 0-1, Rob Hennelly 0-1 ('45)	Referee: David Gough (Meath)

22 February 2026 Round 4	Armagh	0-19 (19) – (23) 1-20	Donegal	Armagh
15:45 GMT (UTC+0)		(HT: 0-9 - 0-13)		Venue: Athletic Grounds
	Pts: Oisin O'Neill 0-6 (3f), Cian McConville 0-3, Ross McQuillan 0-3, Dara McMullen 0-2 (tp), Jarly Og Burns 0-1, Callum O'Neill 0-1, Ben Crealey 0-1, Conor Turbitt 0-1, Oisin Conaty 0-1	Report	Pts: Conor O'Donnell 1-1, Gavin Multreany 0-4 (2tpf), Michael Langan 0-4 (2tp), Jason McGee 0-4, Oisín Gallen 0-2, Conor McCahill 0-2, Eoghán Bán Gallagher 0-1, Ryan McHugh 0-1, Shane O'Donnell 0-1	Referee: Brendan Cawley (Kildare); Attendance: 10,256

==== Round 5 ====
1 March 2026 Round 5	Kerry	1-18 (21) – (7) 0-07	Monaghan	Killarney
13:15 GMT (UTC+0)		(HT: 0-5 - 0-4)		Venue: Fitzgerald Stadium
	Pts: David Clifford 1-3 (1tp, 1f), Paudie Clifford 0-4, Sean O'Shea 0-4 (2f), Joe O'Connor 0-2, Keith Evans 0-1, Dylan Geaney 0-1, Tadhg Morley 0-1, Donagh O'Sullivan 0-1, Armin Heinrich 0-1	Report	Pts: Oisin McGorman 0-1, Karl Gallagher 0-1, Cameron Dowd 0-1, Dessie Ward 0-1, Robbie Hanratty 0-1, Andrew Woods 0-1, Ryan O'Toole 0-1	Referee: Noel Mooney (Cavan)

1 March 2026 Round 5	Mayo	2-17 (23) – (22) 0-22	Armagh	Castlebar
13:15 GMT (UTC+0)		(HT: 1-11 - 0-5)		Venue: MacHale Park
	Pts: Cian McHale 1-3 (1tp), Jordan Flynn 1-2 (1tp), Conor Loftus 0-3 (1tp), Ryan O'Donoghue 0-3 (1tpf), Kobe McDonald 0-2, Sam Callinan 0-2, Bob Tuohy 0-1, Paul Towey 0-1	Report	Pts: Cian McConville 0-6 (2f), Oisin O'Neill 0-5 (1tp, 2tpf), Greg McCabe 0-3, (1tp), Callum O'Neill (0-2), Blaine Hughes 0-1 (1f), Jason Duffy 0-1, Ross McQuillan 0-1, Tiernan Kelly 0-1, Darragh McMullen 0-1, Oisín Conaty 0-1	Referee: David Coldrick (Meath)

1 March 2026 Round 5	Donegal	1-17 (20) – (20) 0-20	Galway	Ballyshannon
13:15 GMT (UTC+0)		(HT: 1-7 - 0-13)		Venue: Father Tierney Park
	Pts: Conor O'Donnell 1-2, Michael Murphy 0-3 (1f), Jason McGee 0-2, Jamie Brennan 0-2, Michael Langan 0-2, Gavin Mulreany 0-2 (tpf), Peadar Mogan 0-2 (tp), Finnbarr Roarty 0-1, Ryan McHugh 0-1	Report	Pts: Oisin Mac Donnacha 0-8 (3f, 1tp), Ciaran Mulhern 0-3, Shane McGrath 0-2, Robert Finnerty 0-2, Matthew Tierney 0-2, Liam O Conghaile 0-2, Cian Hernon 0-1	Referee: Barry Cassidy (Derry)

1 March 2026 Round 5	Roscommon	2-07 (13) – (24) 1-21	Dublin	Roscommon
14:00 GMT (UTC+0)		(HT: 1-1 - 1-14)		Venue: Dr Hyde Park
	Pts: Daire Cregg 1-1, Dylan Ruane 1-0, Diarmuid Murtagh 0-2 (tp), Robert Heneghan 0-1, Caelim Keogh 0-1, Eoin Colleran 0-1, Senan Lambe 0-1	Report	Pts: Niall Scully 0-4 (1tp, 2f), Luke Breathnach 1-1, Seán Bugler 0-4 (1tp), Paddy Small 0-3 (1tp, 1f), Killian McGinnis 0-2, Hugh O'Sullivan 0-2 (tpf), Eoin Kennedy 0-2 (tp), Charlie McMorrow 0-1, Alex Gavin 0-1, Ross McGarry 0-1	Referee: Conor Lane (Cork)

==== Round 6 ====
14 March 2026 Round 6	Kerry	2-29 (35) – (19) 0-19	Mayo	Tralee
16:00 GMT (UTC+0)		(HT: 0-13 - 0-10)		Venue: Austin Stack Park
	Pts: Seán O'Shea 0-11 (4tp), Dylan Geaney 2-3, David Clifford 0-9 (2tp), Mike Breen 0-1, Joe O'Connor 0-1, Graham O'Sullivan 0-1, Sean O'Brien 0-1, Keith Evans 0-1, Tom O'Sullivan 0-1	Report	Pts: Ryan O'Donoghue 0-8 (4f, 2tp), Fergal Boland 0-3 (1tp), Jack Carney 0-2, Rob Hennelly 0-2 (tpf), Jordan Flynn 0-2 (tp), Kobe McDonald 0-1, Sam Callinan 0-1	Referee: Martin McNally (Monaghan)

14 March 2026 Round 6	Dublin	1-25 (28) – (30) 2-24	Armagh	Dublin
19:00 GMT (UTC+0)		(HT: 1-15 - 1-6)		Venue: Croke Park
	Pts: Paddy Small 0-6 (1tp), Niall Scully 0-5 (2f), Luke Breathnach 0-4, Seán Bugler 0-4 (1tp), Ross McGarry 1-0, Killian McGinnis 0-3, Eoin Kennedy 0-2, Cormac Costello 0-1	Report	Pts: Oisín Conaty 1-3, Cian McConville 1-3 (2f), Oisín O'Neill 0-5 (3f, 1tpf), Conor Turbitt 0-3 (1tp), Tomás McCormack 0-3, Ross McQuillan 0-3, Jason Duffy 0-2, Callum O’Neill 0-1, Ben Crealey 0-1	Referee: David Gough (Meath)

15 March 2026 Round 6	Roscommon	2-20 (26) – (20) 0-20	Donegal	Roscommon
13:30 GMT (UTC+0)		(HT: 1-13 - 0-5)		Venue: Dr Hyde Park
	Pts: Diarmuid Murtagh 1-5 (1tpf, 3f), Enda Smith 0-6 (2tp), Conor Hand 1-1, Keith Doyle 0-3 (1tp), Colm Neary 0-2, Senan Lambe 0-2, Robert Heneghan 0-1	Report	Pts: Jason McGee 0-4 (2tp), Shea Malone 0-3 (1tp), Conor O'Donnell 0-2, Michael Murphy 0-2 (1f), Michael Langan 0-2 (tp), Finnbarr Roarty 0-2 (tp), Conor McCahill 0-1, Gavin Mulreany 0-1 ('45), Eoghán Bán Gallagher 0-1, Peadar Mogan 0-1, Jamie Brennan 0-1	Referee: Brendan Griffin (Kerry)

15 March 2026 Round 6	Monaghan	2-09 (15) – (23) 1-20	Galway	Inniskeen
15:45 GMT (UTC+0)		(HT: 0-4 - 1-5)		Venue: Grattan Park
	Pts: Mícheál Bannigan 0-3, Mícheál McCarville 1-0, Dessie Ward 1-0, Jack McCarron 0-2 (tpf), Stephen O'Hanlon 0-2, Rory Beggan 0-2 (tpf)	Report	Pts: Robert Finnerty 0-8 (1tp, 1tpf, 2f), Paul Conroy 0-4 (2tp), Matthew Tierney 0-3, Oisín Mac Donnacha 1-0, Dylan McHugh 0-1, John Maher 0-1, Colm Costello 0-1, Seán Kelly 0-1, Céin D'Arcy 0-1	Referee: Barry Tiernan (Dublin)

==== Round 7 ====
22 March 2026 Round 7	Armagh	1-21 (24) – (24) 0-24	Kerry	Armagh
15:30 GMT (UTC+0)		(HT: 0-10 - 0-12)		Venue: Athletic Grounds
	Pts: Oisín O'Neill 1-2 (1f), Darragh McMullen 0-4 (1tp), Conor Turbitt 0-3 (1tp), Ross McQuillan 0-3, Cian McConville 0-3 (2f), Oisín Conaty 0-2, Jarly Óg Burns 0-1, Ben Crealey 0-1, Tomás McCormack 0-1, Greg McCabe 0-1	Report	Pts: David Clifford 0-10 (1tp, 1tpf, 1f), Tom O'Sullivan 0-5 (2tp), Joe O'Connor 0-4 (1tp), Dylan Geaney 0-4, Seán O'Shea 0-1	Referee: Brendan Cawley (Kildare); Attendance: 12,124

22 March 2026 Round 7	Galway	0-20 (20) – (18) 1-15	Dublin	Galway
15:30 GMT (UTC+0)		(HT: 0-7 - 0-12)		Venue: Pearse Stadium
	Pts: Robert Finnerty 0-8 (2f, 1tp), Oisín Mac Donnacha 0-4 (2f, 1tpf), Cian Hernon 0-2, Paul Conroy 0-2 (1tp), Céin D'Arcy 0-1, Seán Ó Maoilchiaráin 0-1, Liam Ó Conghaile 0-1, Daniel O'Flaherty 0-1	Report	Pts: Killian McGinnis 1-3, Seán Bugler 0-5 (1tp), Hugh O'Sullivan 0-2 (tpf), Ross McGarry 0-2, Ciarán Kilkenny 0-1, Niall O'Callaghan 0-1, Con O'Callaghan 0-1	Referee: Fergal Kelly (Longford); Attendance: 9,274

22 March 2026 Round 7	Mayo	4-26 (38) – (17) 2-11	Roscommon	Castlebar
15:30 GMT (UTC+0)		(HT: 4-11 - 1-5)		Venue: MacHale Park
	Pts: Ryan O'Donoghue 1-4 (1pen, 1m, 1f), Aidan O'Shea 1-2, Jack Carney 1-2, Jordan Flynn 0-3, Cian McHale 0-3, Paul Towey 1-0, Tommy Conroy 0-2, Cillian O'Connor 0-2 (1m), Hugh O'Loughlin 0-2, Michael Plunkett 0-1, Jack Coyne 0-1, Frank Irwin 0-1, David McBrien 0-1, Jack Livingstone 0-1 ('45), Diarmuid Duffy 0-1	Report	Pts: Daire Cregg 0-5 (1f, 1m), Eoin Collernan 1-1, Ben O'Carroll 1-1, Shane Cunnane 0-1, Declan Kenny 0-1, Jack Duggan 0-1, Colm Neary 0-1	Referee: Conor Lane (Cork); Attendance: 9,301

22 March 2026 Round 7	Monaghan	3-16 (25) – (29) 3-20	Donegal	Clones
15:30 GMT (UTC+0)		(HT: 3-7 - 2-11)		Venue: St Tiernach's Park
	Pts: Andrew Woods 1-3, Ryan O'Toole 1-1, Stephen O'Hanlon 1-0, Dessie Ward 0-3 (1tp), Jack McCarron 0-2 (1f), Rory Beggan 0-2 (tpf), Micheál Bannigan 0-1 (f), Louis Kelly 0-1, Ryan Wylie 0-1, Fionán Carolan 0-1, Aaron Carey 0-1	Report	Pts: Shea Malone 2-3, Jason McGee 0-5 (1tp), Michael Langan 0-5 (1f), Jamie Brennan 1-0, Conor O'Donnell 0-2, Seán Martin 0-1, Eoghán Bán Gallagher 0-1, Finnbarr Roarty 0-1, Peadar Mogan 0-1, Caolan McColgan 0-1	Referee: Kieran Eannetta (Tyrone)

=== Final ===
TG4

29 March 2026
16:00 GMT (UTC+0)
Final

Report

Donegal	3-20 (29) – (16) 2-10	Kerry
(HT: 0-13 - 1-2)
Pts: Michael Murphy 1-5 (2tpf, 1f), Michael Langan 0-6 (2tp), Conor O'Donnell 1-1, Ryan McHugh 0-3, Max Campbell 0-3, Caolan McColgan 1-0, Peadar Mogan 0-1, Finnbarr Roarty 0-1		Pts: David Clifford 1-1, Keith Evans 1-1, Tomás Kennedy 0-3 (1tp), Armin Heinrich 0-2, Seán O'Shea 0-1, Tom O'Sullivan 0-1, Dylan Geaney 0-1

Croke Park, Dublin
Referee: David Gough (Meath)
Attendance: 35,071

GK	1	Gavin Mulreany
FB	2	Caolan McColgan
FB	3	Brendan McCole
FB	4	Eoghan Bán Gallagher
HB	5	Ryan McHugh	(substituted off) 64'
HB	6	Caolan McGonagle
HB	26	Max Campbell	(substituted off) 63'
MF	8	Jason McGee
MF	9	Hugh McFadden
HF	10	Shane O'Donnell (c)
HF	11	Michael Langan (c)
HF	12	Peadar Mogan
FF	13	Conor O'Donnell
FF	14	Michael Murphy	(substituted off) 56'
FF	15	Shea Malone	(substituted off) 61'
Substitutes:
	16	Pádraig Mac Giolla Bhríde
	17	Stephen McMenamin	(substituted on) 61'
	18	Oisin Caulfield
	19	Mark Curran
	20	Seanán Carr
	21	Paul O'Hare
	22	Sean Martin	(substituted on) 63'
	23	Jamie Brennan
	24	Eoin McHugh	(substituted on) 64'
	25	Kevin Muldoon
	7	Finnbarr Roarty	(substituted on) 56'
Manager:
Jim McGuinness

GK	1	Shane Murphy
FB	17	Tadhg Morley
FB	3	Jason Foley	(substituted off) 53'
FB	4	Dylan Casey
HB	5	Tom O'Sullivan
HB	6	Mike Breen
HB	7	Armin Heinrich
MF	8	Mark O'Shea
MF	20	Liam Smith	(substituted off) 32'
HF	10	Joe O'Connor
HF	11	Seán O'Shea
HF	12	Graham O'Sullivan	(substituted off) 46'
FF	13	Dylan Geaney	(substituted off) 56'
FF	14	David Clifford
FF	15	Keith Evans	(substituted off) 60'
Substitutes:
	16	Seán Broderick
	2	Joey Nagle
	18	Cillian Trant	(substituted on) 60'
	19	Micheál Burns	(substituted on) 46'
	9	Thomas O'Donnell
	21	Donagh O'Sullivan
	22	Charlie Keating
	23	Eddie Healy
	24	Tom Leo O'Sullivan	(substituted on) 53'
	25	Tomás Kennedy	(substituted on) 32'
	26	Paul Geaney (c)	(substituted on) 56'
Manager:
Jack O'Connor

=== Division 1 Scoring Statistics ===
Rank	Player	Team	Tally	Total	Matches	Average
1	David Clifford	Kerry	4-42	54	7	7.71
2	Diarmuid Murtagh	Roscommon	4-30	42	6	7.00
3	Daire Cregg	Roscommon	2-32	38	7	5.43
4	Oisín O'Neill	Armagh	1-33	36	7	5.14
4	Ryan O'Donoghue	Mayo	1-33	36	7	5.14
4	Robert Finnerty	Galway	1-33	36	7	5.14
7	Seán O'Shea	Kerry	0-33	33	8	4.13
8	Conor O'Donnell	Donegal	4-17	29	8	3.63
8	Michael Langan	Donegal	0-29	29	8	3.63
10	Cian McConville	Armagh	1-25	28	7	4.00

=== Scoring Events ===
- Widest winning margin: 21 points
  - Mayo 4-26 – 2-11 Roscommon
- Most goals in a match: 6
  - Mayo 4-26 – 2-11 Roscommon
  - Donegal 3-20 – 3-16 Monaghan
- Most points in a match: 49
  - Armagh 2-24 – 1-25 Dublin
- Most goals by one team in a match: 4
  - Mayo 4-26 – 2-11 Roscommon
- Most points by one team in a match: 29
  - Kerry 2-29 – 0-19 Mayo
- Highest aggregate score: 58 points
  - Armagh 2-24 – 1-25 Dublin
- Lowest aggregate score: 28 points
  - Kerry 1-18 – 0-07 Monaghan

== Division 2 ==
Locations of the 2026 NFL Division 2 teams

=== Table ===
Pos	Team	Pld	W	D	L	PF	PA	PD	Pts	Qualification
1	Cork (Note: Cork are ranked ahead of Meath as they won the head-to-head game between the two teams.)	7	6	0	1	164	159	+5	12	Advance to NFL Division 2 Final and promotion to 2027 NFL Division 1
2	Meath	7	6	0	1	174	141	+33	12	Advance to NFL Division 2 Final and promotion to 2027 NFL Division 1
3	Louth (Note: Louth are ranked ahead of Derry as they won the head-to-head game between the two teams.)	7	5	0	2	154	133	+21	10	
4	Derry	7	5	0	2	164	118	+46	10	
5	Tyrone	7	2	1	4	154	149	+5	5	
6	Cavan	7	2	0	5	137	161	−24	4	
7	Kildare	7	1	1	5	142	165	−23	3	Relegation to 2027 NFL Division 3
8	Offaly	7	0	0	7	124	187	−63	0	Relegation to 2027 NFL Division 3

Source: GAA.ie
Rules for classification: Tiebreakers

==== Round 1 ====
24 January 2026 Round 1	Meath	0-19 (19) – (16) 1-13	Derry	Dublin
15:00 GMT (UTC+0)		(HT: 0-11 - 1-5)		Venue: Croke Park
	Pts: Jack Flynn 0-7 (1tp, 1tpf, 1'45), Mathew Costello 0-3 (1tpf, 1f), Jordan Morris 0-3 (1tp), Sean Brennan 0-2 (1tpf), Eoghan Frayne 0-1, Bryan Menton 0-1, James Conlon 0-1, Ciaran Caulfield 0-1	Report	Pts: Shane McGuigan 0-7 (1tpf, 1f), Paul Cassidy 1-3 (1tp), Gareth McKinless 0-1, Ethan Doherty 0-1, Matthew Downey 0-1	Referee: Barry Tiernan (Dublin)

24 January 2026 Round 1	Tyrone	2-16 (22) – (22) 1-19	Kildare	Omagh
18:00 GMT (UTC+0)		(HT: 0-8 - 1-8)		Venue: Healy Park
	Pts: Ethan Jordan 1-9 (2tpf, 1f, 1tp), Eoin McElholm 1-1, Joe Oguz 1-0, Darragh Canavan 0-2, Michel Conroy 0-1, Ciaran Daly 0-1, Ciaran Bogue 0-1, Ronan Cassidy 0-1	Report	Pts: Brian McLoughlin 0-9 (3f, 2tp), Alex Beirne 0-5 (1f, 1tpf), Darragh Swords 1-0, Calum Bolton 0-2 (tp), Eoin Cully 0-2, Kevin Feely 0-1	Referee: Niall Cullen (Fermanagh)

25 January 2026 Round 1	Cork	0-24 (24) – (23) 2-17	Cavan	Cork
13:30 GMT (UTC+0)		(HT: 0-13 - 1-8)		Venue: Páirc Uí Chaoimh
	Pts: Mark Cronin 0-7 (3f, 1m), Steven Sherlock 0-4 (1tpf, 1tp), Seán McDonnell 0-3 (1tp), Brian Hurley 0-3 (1tp), Luke Fahy 0-2, Paul Walsh 0-2, Colm O'Callaghan 0-1, Ruairí Deane 0-1, Chris Óg Jones 0-1	Report	Pts: Dara McVeety 1-4, Ciarán Brady 1-1, Gearóid McKiernan 0-3 (1tpf), Paddy Lynch 0-3 (1tpf, 1f), Oisin Brady 0-2, Niall Carolan 0-1, Gerard Smith 0-1, Tiarnan Madden 0-1, Peter Corrigan 0-1	Referee: Brendan Griffin (Kerry)

25 January 2026 Round 1	Offaly	0-19 (19) – (24) 1-21	Louth	Tullamore
14:00 GMT (UTC+0)		(HT: 0-14 - 0-11)		Venue: O'Connor Park
	Pts: Keith O' Neill 0-5 (3f, 1tp), Ciaran Murphy 0-4 (1tp), Dan Molloy 0-3 (1tp), Aaron Leavy 0-2 (tp), Jordan Hayes 0-2, Eoin Sawyer 0-1, Diarmuid Egan 0-1, Cormac Egan 0-1	Report	Pts: Craig Lennon 0-5 (1tp), Sam Mulroy 1-1 (f), Dara McDonnell 0-2, Conor Grimes 0-2, Conor Early 0-2 (tp), Peter Lynch 0-2, Paul Matthews 0-2, Ciarán Downey 0-2, Ryan Burns 0-1, Donal McKenny 0-1, Tadhg McDonnell 0-1	Referee: Barry Judge (Sligo)

==== Round 2 ====
31 January 2026 Round 2	Kildare	3-17 (26) – (17) 0-17	Offaly	Newbridge
18:00 GMT (UTC+0)		(HT: 2-8 - 0-6)		Venue: St Conleth's Park
	Pts: Alex Beirne 1-3 (1f), Brian McLoughlin 0-5, Sam Doran 1-1, Eoin Cully 1-1, Ben Loakman 0-3, Callum Bolton 0-2, Harry O'Neill 0-1, Kevin Feely 0-1	Report	Pts: Keith O'Neill 0-7 (1tpf, 1tp, 1f), Harry Plunkett 0-4 (1tp, 1f), Nathan Poland 0-3, Aaron Leavy 0-1, Dan Molloy 0-1, Marcus Dalton 0-1	Referee: Seamus Mulhare (Laois)

31 January 2026 Round 2	Derry	1-15 (18) – (15) 1-12	Tyrone	Derry
18:00 GMT (UTC+0)		(HT: 1-7 - 1-8)		Venue: Celtic Park
	Pts: Conor Glass 1-1, Shane McGuigan 0-4 (3f), Brendan Rogers 0-3 (1tp), Conor Doherty 0-2, Lachlan Murray 0-2 (1f), Matthew Downey 0-1, Niall Loughlin 0-1, Conor McAteer 0-1	Report	Pts: Ethan Jordan 0-4 (3f, 1'45), Ciaran Daly 1-0, Conor O'Neill 0-2 (tp), Michael McKernan 0-2 (tp), Mattie Donnelly 0-1, Ben Cullen 0-1, Darragh Canavan 0-1, Eoin McElholm 0-1	Referee: Paddy Neilan (Roscommon)

1 February 2026 Round 2	Louth	1-12 (15) – (20) 1-17	Cork	Drogheda
13:30 GMT (UTC+0)		(HT: 0-5 - 1-10)		Venue: Integral GAA Grounds
	Pts: Sam Mulroy 0-6 (3f, 1'45), Ciarán Downey 0-3 (1tp), Dermot Campbell 1-0, Tadhg McDonnell 0-1, Craig Lennon 0-1, Conor Grimes 0-1	Report	Pts: Steven Sherlock 0-8 (1tpf, 4f, 1'45), Chris Óg Jones 1-1, Brian Hurley 0-2 (tp), Seán McDonnell 0-2, Mark Cronin 0-2, Tommy Walsh 0-1, Luke Fahy 0-1	Referee: Anthony Nolan (Wicklow)

1 February 2026 Round 2	Cavan	1-18 (21) – (23) 2-17	Meath	Cavan
15:45 GMT (UTC+0)		(HT: 1-8 - 1-8)		Venue: Breffni Park
	Pts: Gearóid McKiernan 0-9 (1tpf, 4f), Peter Corrigan 1-0, Oisin Brady 0-4 (2f), Dara McVeety 0-2, Cormac O'Reilly 0-1, Gerard Smith 0-1, Caoiman McGovern 0-1	Report	Pts: Jordan Morris 1-4 (1 pen), Ruairi Kinsella 1-2, James Conlon 0-3, Jack Flynn 0-2 (tp), Mathew Costello 0-2, Eoghan Frayne 0-1, Sean Coffey 0-1, Conor Duke 0-1, Ciaran Caulfield 0-1	Referee: Kieran Eannetta (Tyrone); Attendance: 6,883

==== Round 3 ====
14 February 2026 Round 3	Meath	1-20 (23) – (22) 0-22	Louth	Dublin
17:00 GMT (UTC+0)		(HT: 1-15 - 0-7)		Venue: Croke Park
	Pts: Ruairi Kinsella 1-3 (1tp), Jordan Morris 0-6 (1tp, 1f), Mathew Costello 0-3 (1tp), Jack Flynn 0-3 (1tp), Aaron Lynch 0-2, Bryan Menton 0-1, Eoghan Frayne 0-1 (f), Jack O'Connor 0-1	Report	Pts: Sam Mulroy 0-9 (4tpf, 1f), Craig Lennon 0-4, Paul Matthews 0-3 (1tp), Ciarán Downey 0-2, Conor Grimes 0-1, Dara McDonnell 0-1, Tadhg McDonnell 0-1, Ciarán Keenan 0-1	Referee: Brendan Griffin (Kerry)

14 February 2026 Round 3	Kildare	1-18 (21) – (24) 3-15	Derry	Newbridge
18:30 GMT (UTC+0)		(HT: 1-10 - 1-6)		Venue: St. Conleth's Park
	Pts: Ben Loakman 0-10 (2tp, 2f), Brian McLoughlin 1-2, Callum Bolton 0-2, Eoin Cully 0-2, Colm Moran 0-1, Neil Flynn 0-1	Report	Pts: Shane McGuigan 1-5 (1tp, 1f), Lachlan Murray 1-3, Paul Cassidy 1-0, Niall Loughlin 0-3, Conor Doherty 0-3 (1tp), Matthew Downey 0-1	Referee: David Gough (Meath)

15 February 2026 Round 3	Offaly	0-19 (19) – (24) 3-15	Cork	Tullamore
14:00 GMT (UTC+0)		(HT: 0-6 - 2-9)		Venue: O'Connor Park
	Pts: Harry Plunkett 0-8 (4f), Keith O'Neill 0-5 (1tp), Cormac Egan 0-3 (1tp), Niall Furlong 0-1, Jordan Hayes 0-1, Daire McDaid 0-1	Report	Pts: Mark Cronin 1-4 (1f), Colm O'Callaghan 2-1, Steven Sherlock 0-5 (2f), Chris Óg Jones 0-2, Seán McDonnell 0-1, Sean Walsh 0-1, Dara Sheedy 0-1	Referee: Sean Lonergan (Tipperary)

15 February 2026 Round 3	Tyrone	2-23 (29) – (17) 1-14	Cavan	Omagh
15:45 GMT (UTC+0)		(HT: 2-7 - 1-6)		Venue: Healy Park
	Pts: Darragh Canavan 0-9 (1tp, 1f), Mattie Donnelly 1-1, Eoin McElholm 0-4, Brian Kennedy 1-0, Frank Burns 0-2, Seanie O'Donnell 0-1, Conn Kilpatrick 0-1, Ben Cullen 0-1, Michael McKernan 0-1, Ronan Cassidy 0-1, Joe Oguz 0-1, Rory Brennan 0-1	Report	Pts: Paddy Lynch 0-5 (2f), Tiarnan Madden 1-0, Gearóid McKiernan 0-3, Oisin Brady 0-3 (1tpf), Dara McVeety 0-1, Peter Corrigan 0-1, Gerard Smith 0-1	Referee: Barry Tiernan (Dublin)

==== Round 4 ====
21 February 2026 Round 4	Derry	2-25 (31) – (8) 0-8	Offaly	Derry
18:00 GMT (UTC+0)		(HT: 2-17 - 0-3)		Venue: Celtic Park
	Pts: Niall Loughlin 1-4 (1tp), Shane McGuigan 0-7 (2f, 1tp), Matthew Downey 1-2, Paul Cassidy 0-5 (2tp), Brendan Rogers 0-2 (tp), Ethan Doherty 0-2, Jack Doherty 0-1, Niall Toner 0-1, Niall O'Donnell 0-1	Report	Pts: Harry Plunkett 0-3 (1tp), Keith O'Neill 0-3, Jordan Hayes 0-2	Referee: Fergal Kelly (Longford)

22 February 2026 Round 4	Cork	1-23 (26) – (24) 1-21	Meath	Cork
14:00 GMT (UTC+0)		(HT: 1-15 - 0-11)		Venue: Páirc Uí Rinn
	Pts: Chris Óg Jones 1-4, Mark Cronin 0-5 (2tp), Dara Sheedy 0-4, Steven Sherlock 0-4 (1tp, 1f, 1'45), Seán McDonnell 0-3, Luke Fahy 0-1, Colm O'Callaghan 0-1, Ian Maguire 0-1	Report	Pts: Eoghan Frayne 1-3, Jordan Morris 0-4 (1f), Jack Flynn 0-3, Ruairi Kinsella 0-3, Sean Brennan 0-2 (tpf), Aaron Lynch 0-2, Jack O'Connor 0-2, Sean Coffey 0-1, Ciaran Caulfield 0-1	Referee: Conor Dourneen (Cavan)

22 February 2026 Round 4	Louth	1-15 (18) – (13) 0-13	Tyrone	Ardee
14:00 GMT (UTC+0)		(HT: 1-8 - 0-8)		Venue: Pairc Mhuire
	Pts: Sam Mulroy 0-7 (1tpf, 5f), Ciarán Downey 1-0, Conor Grimes 0-3 (1tp), Dara McDonnell 0-2 (tp), Craig Lennon 0-2, Kieran McArdle 0-1	Report	Pts: Darragh Canavan 0-6 (2f), Niall Morgan 0-2 (1'45, 1f), Seanie O'Donnell 0-1, Michael McKernan 0-1, Ciaran Daly 0-1, Darren McCurry 0-1, Ronan Cassidy 0-1	Referee: David Murnane (Cork)

22 February 2026 Round 4	Cavan	0-16 (16) – (13) 0-13	Kildare	Cavan
15:00 GMT (UTC+0)		(HT: 0-5 - 0-5)		Venue: Breffni Park
	Pts: Paddy Lynch 0-9 (1tp, 1tpf, 3f), Dara McVeety 0-2, Oisin Brady 0-2, Gerard Smith 0-1, Tiarnan Madden 0-1 (f), Gearóid McKiernan 0-1	Report	Pts: Ben Loakman 0-5 (2tpf), James Harris 0-2, Colm Moran 0-2, Darragh Kirwan 0-2, Brian McLoughlin 0-1, Callum Bolton 0-1	Referee: Barry Judge (Sligo)

==== Round 5 ====
28 February 2026 Round 5	Cavan	1-12 (15) – (25) 1-22	Louth	Cavan
17:15 GMT (UTC+0)		(HT: 0-6 - 1-16)		Venue: Breffni Park
	Pts: Paddy Lynch 0-4 (1tpf, 1f, 1'45), Ciarán Brady 1-0, Cian Shekleton 0-2, Gearóid McKiernan 0-2 (2f), Brian O'Connell 0-1, Gerard Smith 0-1, Ryan Brady 0-1, Dara McVeety 0-1	Report	Pts: Ryan Burns 1-4, Sam Mulroy 0-6 (1tpf, 2f, 1tp), Ciarán Downey 0-4, Tadhg McDonnell 0-3 (1tp), Paul Matthews 0-3 (1tp), Conor Grimes 0-1, Kieran McArdle 0-1	Referee: Paul Faloon (Down); Attendance: 3,894

28 February 2026 Round 5	Tyrone	0-28 (28) – (19) 2-13	Offaly	Dungannon
18:00 GMT (UTC+0)		(HT: 0-12 - 1-7)		Venue: O'Neill Park
	Pts: Ruairí Canavan 0-5 (1tp, 2f), Darren McCurry 0-3, Ronan Cassidy 0-3, Mattie Donnelly 0-3, Seanie O'Donnell 0-3, Brian Kennedy 0-2 (tp), Niall Devlin 0-2, Michael McKiernan 0-1, Ruairi McCullagh 0-1 (f), Aidan Clarke 0-1, Cormac Quinn 0-1, Ciaran Daly 0-1, Lorcan McGarrity 0-1, Ben Cullen 0-1	Report	Pts: Darragh Flynn 1-2, Keith O'Neill 0-4 (2f), Jack McEvoy 1-0, Harry Plunkett 0-3 (1tp), Cormac Egan 0-2, Marcas Dalton 0-1, Rory Egan 0-1	Referee: James Molloy (Galway)

28 February 2026 Round 5	Kildare	0-10 (10) – (24) 1-21	Meath	Newbridge
19:00 GMT (UTC+0)		(HT: 0-5 - 1-9)		Venue: St Conleth's Park
	Pts: Ben Loakman 0-3 (2f), Brian McLoughlin (1tp) 0-3, Darragh Kirwan 0-2 (tp), Alex Beirne 0-1 (1f), Colm Moran 0-1	Report	Pts: Jordan Morris 1-5, Sean Brennan 0-5 (2tpf, 1'45), Jack O'Connor 0-4, Ruairi Kinsella 0-2, Aaron Lynch 0-1, Eoghan Frayne 0-1, Jack Flynn 0-1, Charlie O'Connor 0-1, Keith Curtis 0-1	Referee: Sean Hurson (Tyrone)

1 March 2026 Round 5	Derry	1-31 (34) – (14) 0-14	Cork	Derry
13:00 GMT (UTC+0)		(HT: 1-10 - 0-9)		Venue: Celtic Park
	Pts: Shane McGuigan 0-9 (2f, 1tp), Lachlan Murray 1-4, Paul Cassidy 0-4, Niall Loughlin 0-4 (1tp), Ethan Doherty 0-2, Niall Toner 0-2, Conor Doherty 0-1, Conor Glass 0-1, Padraig McGrogan 0-1, Sean Kearney 0-1, Dan Higgins 0-1, Shea McGuckin 0-1 ('45)	Report	Pts: Steven Sherlock 0-6 (2tp, 1'45), Colm O'Callaghan 0-2, Darragh Cashman 0-2, Seán Walsh 0-1, Paul Walsh 0-1, Ruairí Deane 0-1, Dara Sheedy 0-1	Referee: Seamus Mulhare (Laois)

==== Round 6 ====
14 March 2026 Round 6	Louth	1-19 (22) – (18) 0-18	Derry	Ardee
15:00 GMT (UTC+0)		(HT: 1-8 - 0-4)		Venue: Pairc Mhuire
	Pts: Sam Mulroy 1-6, (1tp, 1f, 1pen), Tadhg McDonnell 0-3 (1tp), Dara McDonnell 0-3 (1tp), Paul Matthews 0-2 (tp), Kieran McArdle 0-2, Conall McCaul 0-1, Conall McKeever 0-1, Sean Reynolds 0-1	Report	Pts: Niall Loughlin 0-7 (1tpf, 1f), Conor Glass 0-3 (1tp), Paul Cassidy 0-2 (tp), Matthew Downey 0-2 (tp), Lachlan Murray 0-1, Brendan Rogers 0-1, Ethan Doherty 0-1, Eoin McEvoy 0-1	Referee: Brendan Cawley (Kildare)

14 March 2026 Round 6	Cork	1-31 (34) – (25) 2-19	Kildare	Cork
17:00 GMT (UTC+0)		(HT: 1-22 - 1-6)		Venue: Páirc Uí Chaoimh
	Pts: Chris Óg Jones 1-9 (2tp), Steven Sherlock 0-10 (2tp, 1tpf, 1’45), Mark Cronin 0-4 (1tp), Luke Fahy 0-3 (1tp), Dara Sheedy 0-3 (1tp), Tommy Walsh 0-1, Paul Walsh 0-1	Report	Pts: Jack Robinson 1-1 (1f), Ben McCormack 0-4 (2tp), Brendan Gibbons 1-0, Alex Beirne 0-3 (1tp, 1f), Darragh Kirwan 0-3, Ben Loakman 0-2 (tp), Colm Moran 0-2, Colm Dalton 0-2, Callum Bolton 0-1, Brian McLoughlin 0-1	Referee: Liam Devenney (Mayo)

14 March 2026 Round 6	Meath	3-24 (33) – (28) 2-22	Tyrone	Dublin
17:00 GMT (UTC+0)		(HT: 2-12 - 1-11)		Venue: Croke Park
	Pts: Jack O'Connor. 1-8 (4tp), Aaron Lynch 2-1, Ruairi Kinsella 0-5 (2tp), Eoghan Frayne 0-4 (1tp), Seán Brennan 0-2 (tpf), Jordan Morris 0-1 (f), Seán Coffey 0-1, Ciarán Caulfield 0-1, Bryan Menton 0-1	Report	Pts: Ethan Jordan 1-9 (4’45, 2tp, 1f), Darren McCurry 0-4 (2f), Niall Devlin 1-0, Darragh Canavan 0-2 (tp), Ruairí Canavan 0-2, Ronan Cassidy 0-2, Mattie Donnelly 0-1, Seánie O’Donnell 0-1, Joey Clarke 0-1	Referee: Niall Cullen (Fermanagh)

15 March 2026 Round 6	Offaly	3-15 (24) – (26) 2-20	Cavan	Tullamore
14:00 GMT (UTC+0)		(HT: 1-9 - 1-7)		Venue: O'Connor Park
	Pts: Dylan Hyland 0-7 (1tp, 1tpf), Aaron Leavy 1-0, Jack McEvoy 1-0, Diarmuid Egan 1-0, Darragh Flynn 0-3 (1tp), Keith O'Neill 0-2, Jordan Hayes 0-2, Ciaran Murphy 0-1	Report	Pts: Ryan Donohoe 1-5 (2tp), Oisin Brady 1-3, Tiarnan Madden 0-3 (1tp), Dara McVeety 0-2 (tp), Ciarán Brady 0-2, Paddy Lynch 0-1, Peter Corrigan 0-1, Gearóid McKiernan 0-1, Eoin Clarke 0-1, Emmanuel Shehu 0-1	Referee: Anthony Nolan (Wicklow)

==== Round 7 ====
22 March 2026 Round 7	Derry	1-20 (23) – (19) 0-19	Cavan	Derry
13:15 GMT (UTC+0)		(HT: 1-9 - 0-9)		Venue: Celtic Park
	Pts: Shane McGuigan 0-10 (2f, 2tpf), Niall Loughlin 1-1, Lachlan Murray 0-3, Ethan Doherty 0-3, Paul Cassidy 0-1, Ruairí Forbes 0-1, Sean Young 0-1	Report	Pts: Gearóid McKiernan 0-5 (3f), Oisin Brady 0-4 (1tp), Dara McVeety 0-3 (1tp), Paddy Lynch 0-2 (tpf), Tiarnan Madden 0-2, Ryan Donohoe 0-2 (tp), Conor Brady 0-1	Referee: Thomas Murphy (Galway)

22 March 2026 Round 7	Kildare	0-25 (25) – (28) 1-25	Louth	Newbridge
13:15 GMT (UTC+0)		(HT: 0-10 - 0-17)		Venue: St Conleth's Park
	Pts: Brian McLoughlin 0-7 (1f, 1tp, 1tpf), Alex Beirne 0-6 (2f), Jack Robinson 0-5, Ben Loakman 0-2, Tommy Gill 0-2, Colm Moran 0-1, Colm Dalton 0-1, Eoin Cully 0-1	Report	Pts: Sam Mulroy 0-8 (1f, 2tp, 1tpf), Kieran McArdle 1-1, Ciaran Keenan 0-4, Conal McCaul 0-3, Paul Matthews 0-3 (1tp), Dara McDonnell 0-2, Tadhg McDonnell 0-2 (tp), Conor Early 0-1, Sean Callaghan 0-1	Referee: Paddy Neilan (Roscommon)

22 March 2026 Round 7	Offaly	0-18 (18) – (28) 2-22	Meath	Tullamore
13:15 GMT (UTC+0)		(HT: 0-9 - 2-9)		Venue: O'Connor Park
	Pts: Darragh Flynn 0-4, Daire McDaid 0-3 (1tp), Jordan Hayes 0-3, Harry Plunkett 0-3 (1f), Shane Tierney 0-2 (1f), Conor Melia 0-2 (tpf), Eoin Sawyer 0-1	Report	Pts: Jordan Morris 1-6 (1f, 1pen), Bryan Menton 1-0, Aaron Lynch 0-3, Eoghan Frayne 0-2, Donal Keogan 0-2, Sean Brennan 0-2 (tpf), James Conlon 0-2, Cian McBride 0-1, Ruairí Kinsella 0-1, Ciaran Caulfield 0-1, Seán Coffey 0-1, Jason Scully 0-1	Referee: Séamus Mulhare (Laois)

22 March 2026 Round 7	Tyrone	0-19 (19) – (22) 0-22	Cork	Omagh
13:15 GMT (UTC+0)		(HT: 0-8 - 0-9)		Venue: Healy Park
	Pts: Mattie Donnelly 0-6, Ethan Jordan 0-5 (2f, 1tp), Darragh Canavan 0-4 (1f), Darren McCurry 0-2, Conn Kilpatrick 0-1, Ciarán Daly 0-1	Report	Pts: Steven Sherlock 0-5 (2f, 1tp), Brian Hurley 0-4 (1tp), Colm O'Callaghan 0-3, Chris Óg Jones 0-2, Seán McDonnell 0-2, Mark Cronin 0-2 (1f), Ian Maguire 0-1, Luke Fahy 0-1, Tommy Walsh 0-1,	Referee: Martin McNally (Monaghan)

=== Final ===
TG4

29 March 2026
13:45 GMT (UTC+0)
Final

Report

Cork	2-17 (23) – (25) 1-22	Meath
(HT: 0-12 - 0-10)
Pts: Steven Sherlock 0-9 (1f, 1tp), Chris Óg Jones 1-3, Brian Hurley 1-0, Paul Walsh 0-2, Colm O'Callaghan 0-2, Mark Cronin 0-1		Pts: Jack O'Connor 1-2 (tp), Ruairí Kinsella 0-5 (2tp), James Conlon 0-4, Jordan Morris 0-3 (1f), Seán Brennan 0-3 (1tpf, 1'45), Eoghan Frayne 0-3 (3f), Aaron Lynch 0-1, Ciarán Caulfield 0-1

Croke Park, Dublin
Referee: Brendan Griffin (Kerry)
Attendance: 35,071

GK	1	Patrick Doyle
FB	2	Maurice Shanley	(substituted off) 50'
FB	3	Daniel O'Mahony
FB	4	Seán Meehan
HB	5	Brian O'Driscoll
HB	6	Tommy Walsh
HB	7	Luke Fahy	(substituted off) 58'
MF	8	Colm O'Callaghan
MF	9	Ian Maguire (c)
HF	10	Paul Walsh
HF	11	Mark Cronin	(substituted off) 56'
HF	12	Seán McDonnell	(substituted off) 52'
FF	13	Chris Óg Jones
FF	14	Dara Sheedy	(substituted off) 43'
FF	15	Steven Sherlock
Substitutes:
	16	Micheál Aodh Martin
	17	Kevin O'Donovan	(substituted on) 50'
	18	Rory Maguire	(substituted on) 58'
	19	Darragh Cashman
	20	Seán Walsh	(substituted on) 56'
	21	Conor Cahalane
	22	David Buckley
	23	Ruairí Deane	(substituted on) 52'
	24	Eoghan McSweeney
	25	Conor Corbett
	26	Brian Hurley	(substituted on) 43'
Manager:
John Cleary

GK	1	Seán Brennan
FB	2	Seamus Lavin	(substituted off) 45'
FB	3	Seán Rafferty
FB	4	Brian O'Halloran	(substituted off) 52'
HB	5	Donal Keogan
HB	6	Seán Coffey
HB	7	Ciarán Caulfield
MF	8	Bryan Menton
MF	9	Jack Flynn
HF	10	Jack O'Connor	(substituted off) 61'
HF	11	Ruairí Kinsella
HF	12	Cian McBride	(substituted off) 50'
FF	13	Jordan Morris
FF	14	Eoghan Frayne (c)
FF	15	Aaron Lynch	(substituted off) 42'
Substitutes:
	16	Billy Hogan
	17	Killian Smyth	(substituted on) 52'
	18	Ronan Ryan	(substituted on) 45'
	19	Cathal Hickey	(substituted on) 50'
	20	Conor Gray
	21	Charlie O'Connor
	22	Oisín Martin	(substituted on) 61'
	23	James Conlon	(substituted on) 42'
	24	Jason Scully
	25	Conor Duke
	26	Keith Curtis
Manager:
Robbie Brennan

=== Division 2 Scoring Statistics ===
Rank	Player	Team	Tally	Total	Matches	Average
1	Sam Mulroy	Louth	2-43	49	7	7.00
2	Shane McGuigan	Derry	1-43	46	7	6.57
3	Jordan Morris	Meath	3-32	41	8	5.13
3	Steven Sherlock	Cork	0-41	41	8	5.13
5	Ethan Jordan	Tyrone	2-27	33	6	5.50
6	Brian McLoughlin	Kildare	1-27	30	7	4.29
7	Keith O'Neill	Offaly	0-26	26	6	4.33
7	Niall Loughlin	Derry	2-20	26	7	3.71
9	Ruairí Kinsella	Meath	1-21	24	8	3.00
9	Darragh Canavan	Tyrone	0-24	24	6	4.00

=== Scoring Events ===
- Widest winning margin: 23 points
  - Derry 2-25 – 0-08 Offaly
- Most goals in a match: 5
  - Meath 3-24 – 2-22 Tyrone
  - Cavan 2-20 – 3-15 Offaly
- Most points in a match: 50
  - Cork 1-31 – 2-19 Kildare
  - Louth 1-25 – 0-25 Kildare
- Most goals by one team in a match: 3
  - Kildare 3-17 – 0-17 Offaly
  - Derry 3-15 – 1-18 Kildare
  - Cork 3-15 – 0-19 Offaly
  - Meath 3-24 – 2-22 Tyrone
  - Offaly 3-15 – 2-20 Cavan
- Most points by one team in a match: 31
  - Derry 1-31 – 0-14 Cork
  - Cork 1-31 – 2-19 Kildare
- Highest aggregate score: 61 points
  - Meath 3-24 – 2-22 Tyrone
- Lowest aggregate score: 29 points
  - Cavan 0-16 – 0-13 Kildare

== Division 3 ==
=== Table ===
Pos	Team	Pld	W	D	L	PF	PA	PD	Pts	Qualification
1	Down	7	6	0	1	172	144	+28	12	Advance to NFL Division 3 Final and promotion to 2027 NFL Division 2
2	Wexford	7	5	0	2	142	125	+17	10	Advance to NFL Division 3 Final and promotion to 2027 NFL Division 2
3	Westmeath	7	4	0	3	162	141	+21	8	
4	Laois	7	3	1	3	131	130	+1	7	
5	Sligo (Note: Sligo are ranked ahead of Clare as they won the head-to-head game between the two teams.)	7	3	0	4	133	146	−13	6	
6	Clare	7	3	0	4	163	159	+4	6	
7	Limerick	7	2	1	4	119	146	−27	5	Relegation to 2027 NFL Division 4
8	Fermanagh	7	1	0	6	119	150	−31	2	Relegation to 2027 NFL Division 4

Source: GAA.ie
Rules for classification: Tiebreakers

==== Round 1 ====
24 January 2026 Round 1	Down	2-19 (25) – (20) 2-14	Clare	Newry
18:00 GMT (UTC+0)		(HT: 0-10 - 2-9)		Venue: Páirc Esler
	Gls: O Murdock, J McGeough; Pts: O Murdock 2, J McGeough, D Guinness 5 (1 tp), C Doherty 3, S Annett, A Crimmins, P Havern 6	Report	Gls: C Brennan, M McInerney; Pts: S Ryan 2 (1 tp), B McNamara 2 (1 tp), D Bohannon 2, D Coughlan 2, A Griffin 2 (1 tp), M McInerney 3 (1 tp), C Murray	Referee: Conor Dourneen (Cavan)

24 January 2026 Round 1	Laois	1-10 (13) – (13) 0-13	Limerick	Portlaoise
18:00 GMT (UTC+0)		(HT: 1-4 - 0-7)		Venue: O'Moore Park
	Gls: Evan O'Carroll; Pts: Paddy O’Sullivan, Ciaran Burke, Conor Heffernan, Rioghan Murphy, Evan O’Carroll 4, Niall Corbet	Report	Pts: Mark McCarthy, Barry Coleman 2 (1 tp), Eliah O’Riordan 2 (1 tp), Andrew Meade, Conall O’Duinn, James Naughton 3, Danny Neville 2, Emmet Rigter	Referee: Alan Coyne (Westmeath)

25 January 2026 Round 1	Fermanagh	0-12 (12) – (16) 1-13	Wexford	Enniskillen
13:00 GMT (UTC+0)		(HT: 0-6 - 1-5)		Venue: Brewster Park
	Pts: Darragh McGurn 0-3 (1tp), Conor Love 0-3, Garvan Jones 0-3, Cian O'Brien 0-2, Fionan O'Brien 0-1	Report	Pts: Sean Nolan 0-6 (4f), Pairic Hughes 0-4 (1tp), Gavin Sheehan 1-0, Cathal Kehoe 0-1, Tom Byrne 0-1, Eoin Hughes 0-1,	Referee: Enda McFeely (Donegal)

25 January 2026 Round 1	Westmeath	2-14 (20) – (19) 1-16	Sligo	Mullingar
14:00 GMT (UTC+0)		(HT: 2-9 - 0-7)		Venue: Cusack Park
	Pts: Jonathan Lynam 2-0, Luke Loughlin 0-5 (1tpf, 1f), Danny McCartan 0-3 (1tp), Sam McCartan 0-3, Senan Baker 0-1 (f), Matthew Whittaker 0-1, Shane Corcoran 0-1	Report	Pts: Alan McLoughlin 0-4 (1tpf, 2f), Pat Spillane 0-4 (2tp), Cian Lally 1-0, Luke Towey 0-2, Niall Murphy 0-2 (2f), Nathan Mullen 0-1, Darragh Cummins 0-1, Lee Deignan 0-1, Shane Deignan 0-1	Referee: Kevin Faloon (Armagh)

==== Round 2 ====
31 January 2026 Round 2	Limerick	1-14 (17) – (18) 0-18	Down	Rathkeale
14:00 GMT (UTC+0)		(HT: 0-6 - 0-9)		Venue: Mick Neville Park
	Gls: Danny Neville; Pts: Barry Coleman, Paul Maher, Eliah O’Riordan 5 (2tp), Andrew Meade, Robbie Childs 2 (1tp), James Naughton 4	Report	Pts: Pearse McPolin 2, Odhran Murdock, Ryan McEvoy, Daniel Guinness 5 (1tp), Ceilum Doherty 3, Shane Annett 2, Pat Havern 3 (1tp), Jamie Doran	Referee: Fergal Kelly (Longford)

31 January 2026 Round 2	Wexford	0-23 (23) – (9) 0-9	Laois	Wexford
18:00 GMT (UTC+0)		(HT: 0-11 - 0-5)		Venue: Chadwicks Wexford Park
	Pts: Sean Nolan 0-7 (3f, 1tp), Darragh Brooks 0-7 (3tpf, 1'45), Niall Hughes 0-2, Cathal Kehoe 0-2, Pairic Hughes 0-1, Jack Higgins 0-1, Tom Byrne 0-1, Cian Hughes 0-1 (f), Mark Rossiter 0-1	Report	Pts: Rioghan Murphy 0-3, Kevin Swayne 0-1, Evan O'Carroll 0-1 (f), Paul Kingston 0-1 (f), Darragh Galvin 0-1, Conor Heffernan 0-1, Colin Dunne 0-1	Referee: Jonathan Hayes (Limerick)

1 February 2026 Round 2	Clare	1-17 (20) – (25) 2-19	Westmeath	Ennis
14:00 GMT (UTC+0)		(HT: 0-5 - 1-10)		Venue: Páirc Chíosóg
	Pts: Aaron Griffin 0-7 (2tp, 1f), Eoin Cleary 0-3 (1tp), Mark McInerney 0-3 (1tp, 1f), Alan Sweeney 1-0, Brian McNamara 0-2, Cormac Murray 0-1, Jamie Stack 0-1	Report	Pts: Sam McCartan 0-5 (2tp), Ronan Wallace 1-2, Luke Loughlin 0-3 (1f), Brian Cooney 1-0, Kevin O'Sullivan 0-2, Matthew Whittaker 0-2, Ray Connellan 0-2, TJ Cox 0-2, Robert Forde 0-1	Referee: David Murnane (Cork)

1 February 2026 Round 2	Sligo	1-19 (22) – (15) 0-15	Fermanagh	Sligo
14:00 GMT (UTC+0)		(HT: 1-7 - 0-5)		Venue: Markievicz Park
	Pts: Niall Murphy 1-4 (1 pen, 1f), Cian Lally 0-4, Alan McLoughlin 0-3 (1f), Dillon Walsh 0-2, Kyle Cawley 0-1, Joshua Flynn 0-1, Canice Mulligan 0-1, James Donlon 0-1, Luke Casserly 0-1, Nathan Mullen 0-1	Report	Pts: Garvan Jones 0-7 (3f), Josh Largo Elis 0-3, Declan McCusker 0-1, Ciaran Corrigan 0-1, Garvan Quigley 0-1, Paul Breen 0-1, Conor O'Hanlon 0-1	Referee: James Molloy (Galway)

==== Round 3 ====
14 February 2026 Round 3	Down	2-15 (21) – (18) 1-15	Westmeath	Newry
18:00 GMT (UTC+0)		(HT: 1-10 - 0-5)		Venue: Páirc Esler
	Pts: Ceilum Doherty 0-4, John McGeough 1-1, Ryan Magill 1-0, Daniel Guinness 0-3, Adam Crimmins 0-3, Odhran Murdock 0-3, Pearse McPolin 0-1	Report	Pts: Luke Loughlin 0-6 (2tpf, 1f), Brían Cooney 1-1, Robert Forde 0-3, Ray Connellan 0-2, Ronan Wallace 0-1, Senan Baker 0-1, Sam McCartan 0-1	Referee: Noel Mooney (Cavan)

14 February 2026 Round 3	Laois	0-18 (18) – (11) 1-8	Sligo	Portlaoise
18:00 GMT (UTC+0)		(HT: 0-12 - 1-3)		Venue: O'Moore Park
	Pts: Rioghan Murphy 0-6 (1tp, 1f), Evan O'Carroll 0-6 (1tp, 2f), Darragh Galvin 0-3, Brian Byrne 0-2, (tp), Paul Kingston 0-1	Report	Pts: Luke Casserly 1-0, Jack Lavin 0-3 (1tp), Canice Mulligan 0-2, Pat Spillane 0-1, Niall Murphy 0-1, Joshua Flynn 0-1	Referee: Thomas Murphy (Galway)

15 February 2026 Round 3	Fermanagh	0-18 (18) – (24) 2-18	Clare	Enniskillen
13:00 GMT (UTC+0)		(HT: 0-10 - 1-10)		Venue: Brewster Park
	Pts: Garvan Jones 0-5 (1tp), Darragh McGurn 0-3 (1tp), Josh Largo Ellis 0-3, Ronan McCaffrey 0-3, Conor O'Hanlon 0-2 (tp), Joe McDade 0-2	Report	Pts: Mark McInerney 0-8 (1tp, 5f), Aaron Griffin 1-4 (1tp), Daniel Walsh 1-0, Eoin Cleary 0-3, Brian McNamara 0-2, Shane Griffin 0-1	Referee: Alan Coyne (Westmeath)

15 February 2026 Round 3	Limerick	1-15 (18) – (17) 1-14	Wexford	Rathkeale
14:00 GMT (UTC+0)		(HT: 0-5 - 0-9)		Venue: Mick Neville Park
	Pts: James Naughton 0-7 (1tp, 1tpf), Peter Nash 1-0, Cillian Fahy 0-3, Robbie Childs 0-2, Eliah O'Riordan 0-2 (tp), Tony McCarthy 0-1	Report	Pts: Sean Nolan 0-4 (2f), Niall Hughes 1-0, Cathal Kehoe 0-2 (tp), Dylan Furlong 0-2 (tp), Eoin Porter 0-1, Glen Malone 0-1, Liam Coleman 0-1, Jack Higgins 0-1, Tom Byrne 0-1, Mark Rossiter 0-1	Referee: Christopher Ryan (Galway)

==== Round 4 ====
22 February 2026 Round 4	Sligo	1-18 (21) – (18) 1-15	Limerick	Sligo
13:00 GMT (UTC+0)		(HT: 1-10 - 1-6)		Venue: Markievicz Park
	Pts: Niall Murphy 0-6 (3f), Cian Lally 1-2 (1tp), Alan McLoughlin 0-4 (2f), Luke Towey 0-1, Ross Doherty 0-1, Canice Mulligan 0-1, Kyle Cawley 0-1, Joshua Flynn 0-1, Shane Deignan 0-1	Report	Pts: James Naughton 0-7 (2f, 1tp), Eliah O'Riordan 0-6 (3tpf), Danny Neville 1-0, Barry Coleman 0-1, Peter Nash 0-1	Referee: Enda McFeely (Donegal)

22 February 2026 Round 4	Westmeath	1-26 (29) – (17) 2-11	Fermanagh	Mullingar
14:00 GMT (UTC+0)		(HT: 0-8 - 2-9)		Venue: Cusack Park
	Pts: Luke Loughlin 1-4 (1tpf, 1f), Brían Cooney 0-7 (1tp), Ronan Wallace 0-3 (1tp), Matthew Whittaker 0-3, Sam McCartan 0-3 (1tp), Charlie Drumm 0-1, Ray Connellan 0-1, Kevin O'Sullivan 0-1, Shane Corcoran 0-1, Robert Forde 0-1, Brandon Kelly 0-1	Report	Pts: Garvan Jones 0-8 (2tp, 1tpf), Aogan Kelm 1-1, Paul Breen 1-0, Conor O'Hanlon 0-1, Ciaran Corrigan 0-1	Referee: Thomas Murphy (Galway)

22 February 2026 Round 4	Clare	0-24 (24) – (21) 2-15	Laois	Ennis
14:00 GMT (UTC+0)		(HT: 0-8 - 0-9)		Venue: Páirc Chíosóg
	Pts: Eoin Cleary 0-10 (1tpf, 2f), Aaron Griffin 0-6 (2tp, 1f), Mark McInerney 0-3 (1f), Cormac Murray 0-3 (1tp), Dermot Coughlan 0-1, Jamie Stack 0-1	Report	Pts: Evan O'Carroll 1-5 (3f), Killian Roche 0-4 (2tpf), Patrick O'Sulllivan 1-0, Brian Byrne 0-2 (tp), Rioghan Murphy 0-2 (1f), Ciaran Burke 0-1, Darren Brennan 0-1	Referee: James Molloy (Galway)

22 February 2026 Round 4	Wexford	1-19 (22) – (32) 1-29	Down	Wexford
14:00 GMT (UTC+0)		(HT: 0-14 - 1-13)		Venue: Chadwicks Wexford Park
	Pts: Darragh Brooks 0-8 (4tpf), Eoin Porter 1-0, Eoghan Nolan 0-3 (1tp), Cathal Kehoe 0-2 (1tp), Mark Rossiter 0-2 (1tp), Jack Higgins 0-1, Paraic Hughes 0-1, Tom Byrne 0-1, Sean Nolan 0-1	Report	Pts: Pat Havern 0-14 (1f, 1tp, 3tpf), Odhran Murdock 0-6 (2tp), Daniel Guinness 0-4, John McGeough 1-0, Ronan Burns 0-2 (1tp), Jamie Doran 0-2 (1tp), Eamon Brown 0-1	Referee: Anthony Nolan (Wicklow)

==== Round 5 ====
28 February 2026 Round 5	Down	1-18 (21) – (18) 1-15	Fermanagh	Newry
18:00 GMT (UTC+0)		(HT: 1-10 - 0-7)		Venue: Páirc Esler
	Pts: Pat Havern 0-7 (3f), Odhran Murdock 1-2, Adam Crimmins 0-4, Callum Rogers 0-2, Ceilum Doherty 0-1, Eamonn Brown 0-1 (m), Liam Kerr 0-1 (f)	Report	Pts: Darragh McGurn 0-5 (1tp), Ronan McCaffrey 1-1, Garvan Jones 0-2 (2f), Conor Love 0-2, Luke Flanagan 0-1, Cian O'Brien 0-1, Declan McCusker 0-1, Ciaran Corrigan 0-1, Mattie McDermott 0-1	Referee: Sean Lonergan (Tipperary)

28 February 2026 Round 5	Laois	3-16 (25) – (16) 1-13	Westmeath	Portlaoise
18:00 GMT (UTC+0)		(HT: 1-9 - 0-9)		Venue: O'Moore Park
	Pts: Evan O'Carroll 1-3 (2f), Paul Kingston 1-2 (1pen, 1f), Ronan Coffey 1-1, Killian Roche 0-3 (1tp), Daragh Galvin 0-3, Darren Brennan 0-1, Kevin Swayne 0-1, Rioghan Murphy 0-1, Padraig Kirwan 0-1	Report	Pts: Luke Loughlin 1-6 (1pen, 2f), Kevin O'Sullivan 0-3, Sam McCartan 0-2 (1f), Shane Allen 0-1, Shane Corcoran 0-1	Referee: Chris Maguire (Cork)

28 February 2026 Round 5	Limerick	1-12 (15) – (24) 1-21	Clare	Rathkeale
18:00 GMT (UTC+0)		(HT: 1-5 - 1-11)		Venue: Mick Neville Park
	Pts: Eliah Riordan 0-5 (2tpf), Cillian Fahy 1-1, Peter Nash 0-3 (1f), Shane Cross 0-2 (1f), Danny Neville 0-1	Report	Pts: Mark McInerney 1-8 (3f, 2tp), Eoin Cleary 0-7 (1tp), Alan Sweeney 0-2, Brendy Rouine 0-1, Brian McNamara 0-1, Connor Meaney 0-1, Cormac Murray 0-1	Referee: Eoin Morrissey (Waterford)

1 March 2026 Round 5	Wexford	0-16 (16) – (10) 1-07	Sligo	Wexford
14:00 GMT (UTC+0)		(HT: 0-10 - 0-3)		Venue: Chadwicks Wexford Park
	Pts: Sean Nolan 0-3 (1tp), Eoghan Nolan 0-3 (1tp), Darragh Brooke 0-3 (1tpf, 1f), Cathal Keogh 0-2, Colum Feeney 0-1, Niall Hughes 0-1 Paraic Hughes 0-1, Mark Rossiter 0-1	Report	Pts: Cian Lally 1-1, Shane Deignan 0-3, Luke Towey 0-1, Niall Murphy 0-1, Lee Deignan 0-1	Referee: Andrew Smith (Meath)

==== Round 6 ====
14 March 2026 Round 6	Fermanagh	2-13 (19) – (17) 1-14	Laois	Enniskillen
18:00 GMT (UTC+0)		(HT: 2-7 - 1-5)		Venue: Brewster Park
	Pts: Darragh McGurn 1-3, Luke Flanagan 1-0, Conor Love 0-3, Brandon Horan 0-3, Ronan McCaffrey 0-2, Ciaran Corrigan 0-1, Garvan Jones 0-1	Report	Pts: Evan O'Carroll 1-6 (1tp), Killian Roche 0-3 (1tp), Trevor Collins 0-1, Conor Heffernan 0-1, Rioghan Murphy 0-1, Brian Byrne 0-1, Paul Kingston 0-1	Referee: Kevin Faloon (Armagh)

15 March 2026 Round 6	Clare	2-17 (23) – (26) 1-23	Wexford	Ennis
14:00 GMT (UTC+0)		(HT: 0-6 - 1-18)		Venue: Páirc Chíosóg
	Pts: Mark McInerney 1-7 (1f, 1tpf, 1tp), Eoin Cleary 1-4 (1f, 1tp), Aaron Griffin 0-3 (1f), Connor Meaney 0-2 (tp), Brian McNamara 0-1	Report	Pts: Sean Nolan 0-5 (3f), Mark Rossiter 0-5 (2tp), Páraic Hughes 0-5 (2tp), Shane Doyle 1-0, Darragh Brooks 0-4 (2tpf), Eoghan Nolan 0-3 (1tp), Eoin Porter 0-1	Referee: Christopher Ryan (Galway)

15 March 2026 Round 6	Sligo	0-21 (21) – (30) 2-24	Down	Sligo
14:00 GMT (UTC+0)		(HT: 0-11 - 0-10)		Venue: Markievicz Park
	Pts: Alan McLoughlin 0-6 (3f, 1tpf), Lee Deignan 0-4 (1tpf), David Quinn 0-4, Niall Murphy 0-3 (3f), Cian Lally 0-1, Canice Mulligan 0-1, Jack Lavin 0-1, Daire O'Boyle 0-1	Report	Pts: Patrick Havern 1-10 (4f, 1tp), Daniel McGuinness 0-6 (1tp), Ceilum Doherty 1-3, Adam Crimmins 0-2, Odhran Murdock 0-2, Donal Scullion 0-1, Ryan McEvoy 0-1	Referee: Jonathan Hayes (Limerick)

15 March 2026 Round 6	Westmeath	4-21 (33) – (17) 3-8	Limerick	Mullingar
14:00 GMT (UTC+0)		(HT: 2-6 - 2-5)		Venue: Cusack Park
	Pts: Ronan Wallace 1-4 (2tp), Luke Loughlin 1-3 (1f), Matthew Whittaker 1-1, Robert Forde 1-1, Brían Cooney 0-4 (1tp), Sam McCartan 0-2 (1f), Brandon Kelly 0-2, Tom Molloy 0-1, Kevin O'Sullivan 0-1, Boidu Sayeh 0-1, TJ Cox 0-1	Report	Pts: James Naughton 1-1, Peter Nash 1-0, Shane Cross 1-0, Tony McCarthy 0-2 (tp), Mark McCarthy 0-2 (tp), Jack McCarthy 0-1, Paul Maher 0-1, Rory O'Brien 0-1	Referee: Diarmuid Boylan (Monaghan)

==== Round 7 ====
22 March 2026 Round 7	Down	0-24 (24) – (28) 2-22	Laois	Newry
14:00 GMT (UTC+0)				Venue: Páirc Esler
	Pts: Patrick Havern 0-10 (2f, 1tp, 1tpf), John McGeough 0-4, Odhran Murdock 0-3 (1tp), Eamon Brown 0-3, Patrick Brooks 0-2, Micheal Rooney 0-1, Daniel McGuinness 0-1		Pts: Paul Kingston 2-3 (1tp), Evan O'Carroll 0-6 (2f), Padraig Kirwan 0-3 (1tp), Killian Roche 0-3 (2f), Patrick O'Sullivan 0-2, Rioghan Murphy 0-2, Daragh Galvin 0-1, Ronan Coffey 0-1 (f), Brian Byrne 0-1	Referee: Barry Judge (Sligo)

22 March 2026 Round 7	Limerick	2-15 (21) – (20) 0-20	Fermanagh	Rathkeale
14:00 GMT (UTC+0)		(HT: 1-3 - 0-14)		Venue: Mick Neville Park
	Pts: James Naughton 1-2 (2f), Eliah Riordan 0-5 (2tp), Tony McCarthy 1-0, Peter Nash 0-3 (1tp), Danny Neville 0-2, Rory O'Brien 0-2 (tp), Shane Cross 0-1	Report	Pts: Darragh McGurn 0-4 (2tp), Conor Love 0-4 (1f), Garvan Jones 0-3, Ciaran Corrigan 0-2 (1f), Sean Cassidy 0-2 (1f), Declan McCusker 0-1, Ronan McCaffrey 0-1, Seán McNally 0-1 ('45), Shaun McCarron 0-1, Oisin Kelm 0-1	Referee: James Molloy (Galway)

22 March 2026 Round 6	Sligo	2-23 (29) – (28) 0-28	Clare	Sligo
14:00 GMT (UTC+0)		(HT: 0-14 - 0-16)		Venue: Markievicz Park
	Pts: Cían Lally 1-4, Alan McLoughlin 0-5 (1f), Kyle Cawley 1-0, Lee Deignan 0-3 (1tp), Shane Deignan 0-3, Luke Towey 0-3, Niall Murphy 0-2 (1f), Darragh Cummins 0-1, Jack Lavin 0-1, Pat Spillane 0-1	Report	Pts: Mark McInerney 0-12 (3f, 2tp, 1tpf), Aaron Griffin 0-7 (1f, 1tp), Eoin Cleary 0-5 (1tp), Fionn Kelleher 0-2 (tp), Shane Griffin 0-1, Michael Nash 0-1	Referee: Conor Dourneen (Cavan)

22 March 2026 Round 7	Wexford	2-16 (22) – (21) 1-18	Westmeath	Wexford
14:00 GMT (UTC+0)		(HT: 0-5 - 0-10)		Venue: Chadwicks Wexford Park
	Pts: Sean Ryan 2-0, Sean Nolan 0-5 (1f), Darragh Brooks 0-4 (2tpf), Jack Higgins 0-2, Niall Hughes 0-2, Mark Rossiter 0-1 (f), Páraic Hughes 0-1, Eoin Porter 0-1	Report	Pts: Sam McCartan 0-5 (1tp), Matthew Whittaker 0-5, Jonathan Lynam 1-0, Ronan Wallace 0-2, Luke Loughlin 0-2, Tom Molloy 0-1, Brían Cooney 0-1, Shane Allen 0-1, Robert Forde 0-1	Referee: Sean Lonergan (Tipperary)

=== Final ===
TG4

28 March 2026
19:40 GMT (UTC+0)
Final

Report

Down	0-21 (21) – (18) 0-18 (a.e.t.)	Wexford
(HT: 0-13 - 0-10) (FT: 0-17 - 0-17)
Pts: Pat Havern 0-5 (2f), Odhran Murdock 0-5 (1tp), Ceilum Doherty 0-4, Daniel Guinness 0-2, Miceal Rooney 0-1, Liam Kerr 0-1, Ryan McEvoy 0-1, Adam Crimmins 0-1, Ruairí McCormack 0-1		Pts: Mark Rossiter 0-6 (2tp), Páiric Hughes 0-5 (1tp), Jack Higgins 0-2, Liam Colemen 0-1, Niall Hughes 0-1, Seán Nolan 0-1, Dylan Furlong 0-1, Robbie Brooks 0-1

Croke Park, Dublin
Referee: Thomas Murphy (Galway)

=== Division 3 Scoring Statistics ===
Rank	Player	Team	Tally	Total	Matches	Average
1	Pat Havern	Down	1-54	57	8	7.13
2	Mark McInerney	Clare	3-44	53	7	7.57
3	Evan O'Carroll	Laois	4-31	43	7	6.14
4	Luke Loughlin	Westmeath	3-28	37	7	5.29
5	Eoin Cleary	Clare	1-32	35	7	5.00
6	Aaron Griffin	Clare	1-29	32	7	4.57
6	Seán Nolan	Wexford	0-32	32	8	4.00
8	Odhran Murdock	Down	2-24	30	8	3.75
8	James Naughton	Limerick	2-24	30	7	4.29
10	Garvan Jones	Fermanagh	0-28	28	7	4.00

=== Scoring Events ===
- Widest winning margin: 16 points
  - Westmeath 4-21 – 3-08 Limerick
- Most goals in a match: 7
  - Westmeath 4-21 – 3-08 Limerick
- Most points in a match: 51
  - Sligo 2-23 – 0-28 Clare
- Most goals by one team in a match: 4
  - Westmeath 4-21 – 3-08 Limerick
- Most points by one team in a match: 29
  - Down 1-29 – 1-19 Wexford
- Highest aggregate score: 57 points
  - Sligo 2-23 – 0-28 Clare
- Lowest aggregate score: 26 points
  - Laois 1-10 – 0-13 Limerick
  - Wexford 0-16 – 1-07 Sligo

== Division 4 ==
=== Table ===
Pos	Team	Pld	W	D	L	PF	PA	PD	Pts	Qualification
1	Carlow	7	5	0	2	158	121	+37	10	Advance to NFL Division 4 Final and promotion to 2027 NFL Division 3
2	Longford	7	4	1	2	153	148	+5	9	Advance to NFL Division 4 Final and promotion to 2027 NFL Division 3
3	Wicklow (Note: Ranked by score difference)	7	4	0	3	152	127	+25	8	
4	Antrim	7	4	0	3	145	131	+14	8	
5	Tipperary	7	3	2	2	138	125	+13	8	
6	London	7	3	1	3	144	147	−3	7	
7	Leitrim	7	3	0	4	128	156	−28	6	
8	Waterford	7	0	0	7	109	172	−63	0	

Source: GAA.ie
Rules for classification: Tiebreakers

==== Round 1 ====
25 January 2026 Round 1	Antrim	1-15 (18) – 2-16 (22)	Carlow	Toome
14:00 GMT (UTC+0)		(HT: 0-9 - 2-4)		Venue: Erins Own, Cargin
	Pts: Niall Burns 0-4 (1tp, 2f), Pat Shivers 0-4 (1f), Joseph Finnegan 1-0, Eoghan McCabe 0-2, Oisin Doherty 0-2, Marc Jordan 0-1, Paddy McAleer 0-1, Ronan Quinn 0-1	Report	Pts: Chris Blake 1-4 (1tpf), Conor Doyle 0-3 (1tp), Niall Roche 1-0, Ross Dunphy 0-2, Conor Crowley 0-2, Colm Hutton 0-2 (tp), Mikey Bambrick 0-1, Padraig Bolger 0-1, Paddy McDonnell 0-1	Referee: Andrew Smith (Meath)

25 January 2026 Round 1	London	0-21 (21) – 0-21 (21)	Tipperary	Ruislip
14:00 GMT (UTC+0)		(HT: 0-11 - 0-7)		Venue: McGovern Park
	Pts: Joseph McGill 0-7 (3f, 1tp), Daniel Clarke 0-6, Shay Rafter 0-4 (1f), Kristian Healy 0-3, Conor O'Donohue 0-1	Report	Pts: Sean O'Connor 0-9 (3tp, 1tpf), Cian Smith 0-7 (1f, 1tp), Michael Freaney 0-2 (tp), Daithi Hogan 0-1, Paudie Feehan 0-1, James Morris 0-1	Referee: Eoin Morrissey (Waterford)

25 January 2026 Round 1	Wicklow	1-17 (20) – 2-13 (19)	Leitrim	Aughrim
14:00 GMT (UTC+0)		(HT: 0-7 - 1-5)		Venue: Echelon Park
	Pts: Mark Jackson 0-9 (1'45, 3tpf), Eoin Darcy 1-5 (1pen, 5f), Christopher O'Brien 0-1, Padraig O'Toole 0-1, Dean Healy 0-1	Report	Pts: Ryan O'Rourke 0-7 (5f), Ben Guckian 1-1 (1f), Riordan O'Rourke 1-1, Tom Prior 0-3, Daire O'Shea 0-1 (1'45)	Referee: Ian Howley (Dublin)

Longford's Round 1 trip to Waterford was postponed due to an unplayable pitch.

8 February 2026 Round 1	Waterford	3-14 (23) – (24) 2-18	Longford	Dungarvan
14:00 GMT (UTC+0)		(HT: 1-7 - 1-8)		Venue: Fraher Field
	Pts: Conor Murray 0-5 (1tpf), Aaron Ryan 1-1, Stephen Curry 0-4 (2f), Darragh Walsh 1-0, Liam Mulligan 1-0, Dermot Ryan 0-2, Donal Fitzgerald 0-1, James Walsh 0-1	Report	Pts: Dylan Farrell 1-4 (2f, 2'45), Daniel Reynolds 1-2, Dessie Reynolds 0-5 (2tp), Peter Lynn 0-2, Paddy Moran 0-2, Matthew Carey 0-1 (f), Oran Kenny 0-1, Cian Brady 0-1	Referee: James Regan (Cork)

==== Round 2 ====
31 January 2026 Round 2	Carlow	1-15 (18) – (15) 2-09	Wicklow	Carlow
18:00 GMT (UTC+0)		(HT: 1-7 - 1-7)		Venue: Netwatch Cullen Park
	Pts: Chris Blake 0-8 (1tpf, 1tp), Paddy McDonnell 1-1, Colm Hulton 0-2, Conor Doyle 0-1, Mikey Bambrick 0-1, Conor Crowley 0-1, Ross Dunphy 0-1	Report	Pts: Mark Johnson 0-6 (2tpf, 1'45), Paudraig O'Toole 2-0, Eoin Murtagh 0-1, Cian Deering 0-1, Darragh Fee 0-1	Referee: Pat Clarke (Cavan)

1 February 2026 Round 2	Leitrim	1-16 (19) – (14) 2-08	Waterford	Carrick-on-Shannon
13:00 GMT (UTC+0)		(HT: 1-9 - 2-3)		Venue: Páirc Seán Mac Diarmada
	Pts: Jack Kelly 0-6 (1tp), Ben Guckian 1-2 (2f), Ryan O'Rourke 0-4, Fergal McLoughlin 0-2, Riordan O'Rourke 0-1, Oisin McLoughlin 0-1	Report	Pts: Colin Foley 1-0, Liam Mulligan 1-0, Dermot Ryan 0-3 (1tp), Conor Murray 0-2, Donal Fitzgerald 0-1, Stephen Curry 0-1, Darragh Walsh 0-1	Referee: Mark Loughran (Tyrone)

1 February 2026 Round 2	Longford	2-08 (14) – (19) 0-19	London	Longford
13:00 GMT (UTC+0)		(HT: 0-7 - 0-8)		Venue: Pearse Park
	Pts: Peter Lynn 1-1, Dessie Reynolds 1-0, Matthew Carey 0-3 (1f), Paddy Moran 0-2, Oran Kenny 0-1, Dylan Farrell 0-1	Report	Pts: Kristian Healy 0-4, Shay Rafter 0-3 (1f), Ciaran Diver 0-3, Daniel Clarke 0-2, Jim Davis 0-2, Ciaran McKeon 0-2, Liam Gallagher 0-1, Micheal O'Reilly 0-1, Matt Moynihan 0-1	Referee: Diarmuid Boylan (Monaghan)

1 February 2026 Round 2	Tipperary	1-13 (16) – (12) 1-09	Antrim	Moneygall
14:00 GMT (UTC+0)		(HT: 0-5 - 0-5)		Venue: St Flannan's Park
	Pts: Sean O'Connor 0-7 (5f), Daithi Hogan 1-3 (1m), Cian Smith 0-3 (3f)	Report	Pts: Dominic McEnhill 0-5 (2tp), Patrick McAleer 1-0, Pat Shivers 0-2 (2f), Niall Burns 0-1, Conhuir Johnston 0-1	Referee: Ian Monaghan (Roscommon)

==== Round 3 ====
14 February 2026 Round 3	Waterford	0-9 (9) – (14) 0-14	Wicklow	Dungarvan
18:00 GMT (UTC+0)		(HT: 0-5 - 0-4)		Venue: Fraher Field
	Pts: Dermot Ryan 0-4 (1tp, 2f), Stephen Curry 0-2 (1f), Tommy Martin 0-1, Connor Murray 0-1, James Walsh 0-1	Report	Pts: Dean Healy 0-3 (1tp), Kevin Quinn 0-2 (1f), Eoin Darcy 0-2 (1f), JP Nolan 0-2, Joe Prendergast 0-2, Darragh Fee 0-1, Cillian McDonald 0-1, Oisin McGraynor 0-1 (f)	Referee: Jonathan Hayes (Limerick)

15 February 2026 Round 3	London	1-20 (23) – (25) 2-19	Leitrim	Ruislip
13:00 GMT (UTC+0)		(HT: 1-14 - 1-4)		Venue: McGovern Park
	Pts: Joe McGill 0-9 (2f), Micheal O'Reilly 1-1, Shay Rafter 0-3 (2f), Ciaran Diver 0-3, Kristian Healy 0-2, Liam Gallagher 0-1, Jim Davis 0-1	Report	Pts: Barry McNulty 0-12 (5tp, 1tpf), Tom Prior 1-2, Fergal McLoughlin 1-0, Riordan O'Rourke 0-2, Ryan O'Rourke 0-2 (2f), Paul Honeyman 0-1	Referee: Andrew Smith (Meath)

15 February 2026 Round 3	Antrim	1-14 (17) – (30) 1-27	Longford	Portglenone
14:00 GMT (UTC+0)		(HT: 1-4 - 0-19)		Venue: Roger Casements GAC
	Pts: Adam Loughran 1-2, Pat Shivers 0-4 (2tp), Ryan McQuillan 0-3, Ryan Murray 0-2, James Lenehan 0-1, Niall Burns 0-1, Dominic McEnhill 0-1 (f)	Report	Pts: Matthew Carey 1-9 (6f, 1tp), Oran Kenny 0-6, Daniel Reynolds 0-4, Dessie Reynolds 0-3 (1tp), Joseph Hagan 0-2, Cathal McCabe 0-2, Liam Glennon 0-1	Referee: Kevin Faloon (Armagh)

15 February 2026 Round 3	Tipperary	1-14 (17) – (20) 1-17	Carlow	Thurles
14:00 GMT (UTC+0)		(HT: 1-11 - 1-7)		Venue: Semple Stadium
	Pts: Cian Smith 0-5 (3f), Steven O'Brien 1-2 (1tpf), Sean O'Connor 0-3 (1f, 1tp), Mark Stokes 0-2 (tp), Killian Butler 0-1, Daithi Hogan 0-1	Report	Pts: Chris Blake 0-7 (1tpf, 1tp, 3f), Colm Hulton 0-5, Ross Dunphy 1-0, Conor Crowley 0-3, Paddy McDonnell 0-1, John Murphy 0-1	Referee: James Regan (Cork)

==== Round 4 ====
21 February 2026 Round 4	Carlow	1-26 (29) – (15) 0-15	Waterford	Carlow
17:00 GMT (UTC+0)		(HT: 1-14 - 0-8)		Venue: Netwatch Cullen Park
	Pts: Colm Hulton 0-8 (3tp), Chris Blake 0-8 (6f), Conor Doyle 0-4 (1tpf), Sean Murphy 1-0, Conor Crowley 0-2, Darragh Foley 0-2 (tp), Paddy McDonnell 0-1, Aaron Amond 0-1	Report	Pts: Dermot Ryan 0-6 (1tpf, 1'45), Stephen Curry 0-5 (2f), Michael O'Brien 0-2 (tp), Alan Dunwoody 0-1, Aaron Ryan 0-1	Referee: Christopher Ryan (Galway)

22 February 2026 Round 4	Wicklow	2-26 (32) – (16) 0-16	London	Aughrim
13:00 GMT (UTC+0)		(HT: 1-15 - 0-7)		Venue: Echelon Park
	Pts: Kevin Quinn 1-5 (1tp), Mark Jackson 0-6 (3tpf), Eoin Darcy 0-6 (2f), Sean Murphy 1-0, John Paul Nolan 0-3, Joe Prendergast 0-3, Padraig O'Toole 0-1, Cillian McDonald 0-1, Liam O'Neill 0-1	Report	Pts: Shay Rafter 0-5 (1tp), James Davis 0-3, Joe McGill 0-3 (1f, 1'45), Liam Gallagher 0-2 (tp), Ciaran Driver 0-2, Conall Gallagher 0-1	Referee: Diarmuid Boylan (Monaghan)

22 February 2026 Round 4	Leitrim	1-15 (18) – (26) 2-20	Antrim	Carrick-on-Shannon
14:00 GMT (UTC+0)		(HT: 1-3 - 1-11)		Venue: Páirc Seán Mac Diarmada
	Pts: Barry McNulty 0-7 (1tp, 2tpf), Paul Honeyman 1-3 (1tp), Mark Diffley 0-2 (tp), Ben Guckian 0-2 (tp), Jack Kelly 0-1	Report	Pts: Dominic McEnhill 0-8 (3f, 2tp), John McNabb 0-5 (1tp, 1tpf), Paddy McAleer 1-1, Conor Hand 1-0, Ryan McQuillen 0-3, Eoghan McCabe 0-1, Pat Shivers 0-1, Eunan Walsh 0-1	Referee: Patrick Clarke (Cavan)

22 February 2026 Round 4	Longford	1-15 (18) – (18) 0-18	Tipperary	Longford
14:00 GMT (UTC+0)		(HT: 0-9 - 0-7)		Venue: Pearse Park
	Pts: Dylan Farrell 1-3 (1tpf), Dessie Reynolds 0-3 (1tp), Oran Kenny 0-3, Daniel Reynolds 0-2, Liam Glennon 0-1, Paddy Moran 0-1, Matthew Carey 0-1 (f), Niall Farrelly 0-1	Report	Pts: Cian Smith 0-8 (1tpf), Sean O'Connor 0-6 (1tp, 1tpf), Daithi Hogan 0-3, Steven O'Brien 0-1	Referee: Mark Loughran (Tyrone)

==== Round 5 ====
28 February 2026 Round 5	Antrim	2-18 (24) – (17) 1-14	Wicklow	Portglenone
17:00 GMT (UTC+0)		(HT: 2-8 - 0-4)		Venue: Roger Casements GAC
	Pts: Ryan McQuillan 1-2, John McNabb 0-4 (1tpf, 2f), Dominic McEnhill 0-4 (1tpf, 1tp), Pat Shivers 1-0, Paddy McAleer 0-3 (1tp), Marc Jordan 0-2, Conor Hand 0-1, Adam Loughran 0-1, Ryan Murray 0-1	Report	Pts: Mark Jackson 0-4 (2tpf), Eoin Darcy 0-4 (3f), Oisin McGraynor 1-0, Kevin Quinn 0-3, Christopher O'Brien 0-2 (tp), Sean Murphy 0-1	Referee: Enda McFeely (Donegal)

1 March 2026 Round 5	London	3-16 (25) – (18) 2-12	Waterford	Ruislip
13:00 GMT (UTC+0)		(HT: 3-9 - 2-5)		Venue: McGovern Park
	Pts: Jim Davis 1-4 (1tp), Ciaran Diver 1-3, Joe McGill 0-5, Micheal O'Reilly 1-0, Shay Rafter 0-3, Conal Gallagher 0-1	Report	Pts: Stephen Curry 1-6 (3f), Conor Murray 1-1, Darragh Walsh 0-2, Alan Dunwoody 0-1, Conor Fennell 0-1, Adam Murray 0-1	Referee: Ian Howley (Dublin)

1 March 2026 Round 5	Longford	1-19 (22) – (17) 1-14	Carlow	Longford
14:00 GMT (UTC+0)		(HT: 0-11 - 1-7)		Venue: Pearse Park
	Pts: Dylan Farrell 0-6 (2f), Oran Kenny 0-6 (2tp), James Moran 1-0, Matthew Carey 0-3 (1tp), Paddy Moran 0-2, Matthew Flynn 0-1, Cian Brady 0-1	Report	Pts: Chris Blake 1-2 (1f), Conor Doyle 0-3 (1tp, 1f), Colm Hulton 0-3 (1f), Mikey Bambrick 0-3 (1tp), Dara Curran 0-1, Paddy McDonnell 0-1, Conor Crowley 0-1	Referee: Kieran Eannetta (Tyrone)

1 March 2026 Round 5	Tipperary	1-18 (21) – (8) 0-8	Leitrim	Thurles
14:00 GMT (UTC+0)		(HT: 1-12 - 0-5)		Venue: Semple Stadium
	Pts: Sean O'Connor 1-6 (1tp, 1f), Steven O'Brien 0-6 (2tpf), Cian Smith 0-4 (1f), Paudie Feehan 0-1, Daithi Hogan 0-1	Report	Pts: Oisin McLoughlin 0-3 (1tp, 1f), Keith Keegan 0-2 (tp), Riordan O'Rourke 0-1, Paul Honeyman 0-1 (f), Barry McNulty 0-1	Referee: Alan Coyne (Westmeath)

==== Round 6 ====
14 March 2026 Round 6	Carlow	0-18 (18) – (23) 1-20	London	Carlow
18:00 GMT (UTC+0)		(HT: 0-6 - 0-11)		Venue: Netwatch Cullen Park
	Pts: Ross Dunphy 0-5, Colm Hulton 0-4, Conor Doyle 0-3 (1tp), Mikey Bambrick 0-2 (tp), Chris Blake 0-1 (f), Jamie Clarke 0-1, Liam Gavin 0-1 (‘45), Sean Murphy 0-1	Report	Pts: Ciaran Diver 0-5, Liam Gallagher 0-4 (1tp), Shay Rafter 0-4 (3f), Joe McGill 0-4 (2f), Liam Murphy 1-0, Tighe Barry 0-2, James Davis 0-1	Referee: Ian Monaghan (Armagh)

15 March 2026 Round 6	Waterford	0-11 (11) – (30) 4-18	Antrim	Dungarvan
13:00 GMT (UTC+0)		(HT: 0-4 - 2-13)		Venue: Fraher Field
	Pts: Michael O'Brien 0-5 (2tpf), Stephen Curry 0-2 (1f), James Walsh 0-1, Dermot Ryan 0-1, Caoimhín Walsh 0-1, Conor Keating 0-1	Report	Pts: Dominic McEnhill 0-8 (1tpf, 1tp), Pat Shivers 0-5 (1f, 1tp), Ryan McQuillan 1-0, Adam Loughran 1-0, Marc Jordan 1-0, Peter Healy 1-0, Patrick McAleer 0-2 (1f), Eoghan McCabe 0-1, Joseph Finnegan 0-1, Sean O'Neill 0-1	Referee: Mark Loughran (Tyrone)

15 March 2026 Round 6	Leitrim	3-19 (28) – (18) 1-15	Longford	Carrick-on-Shannon
14:00 GMT (UTC+0)		(HT: 1-12 - 1-7)		Venue: Páirc Seán Mac Diarmada
	Pts: Barry McNulty 1-4 (2tpf), Gavin Reynolds 2-0, Riordan O'Rourke 0-4 (1tp), Ryan O'Rourke 0-3, Jack Kelly 0-2, Killian Gaffney 0-2, Keith Keegan 0-2 (tp), Fergal McLoughlin 0-1, Conor Quinn 0-1	Report	Pts: Matthew Carey 1-3 (2f), Oran Kenny 0-4 (1tp), Dessie Reynolds 0-3 (1tp), Joseph Hagan 0-2, Peter Lynn 0-2, Patrick Moran 0-1	Referee: Eoin Morrissey (Waterford)

15 March 2026 Round 6	Wicklow	3-19 (28) – (13) 0-13	Tipperary	Aughrim
14:00 GMT (UTC+0)		(HT: 2-15 - 0-3)		Venue: Echelon Park
	Pts: Kevin Quinn 1-5 (2tp), Eoin Darcy 1-2 (1f), Oisin McGraynor 0-5 (1tp), Pádraig O'Toole 1-1, Mark Jackson 0-4 (2tpf), Christopher O'Brien 0-1, Conor Fee 0-1	Report	Pts: Sean O'Connor 0-7 (1f, 1tp, 2tpf), Cian Smith 0-2, Paddy Creedon 0-2, Steven O'Brien 0-1, James Morris 0-1	Referee: James Regan (Cork)

==== Round 7 ====
22 March 2026 Round 7	Antrim	0-18 (18) – (17) 1-14	London	Toome
13:00 GMT (UTC+0)		(HT: 0-11 - 0-6)		Venue: Erins Own, Cargin
	Pts: Dominic McEnhill 0-6 (1f, 1tp, 1tpf), Pat Shivers 0-4 (2f), Niall Burns 0-3, Tiernan McCormack 0-2, Ryan McQuillan 0-2, Ronan Boyle 0-1	Report	Pts: Joe McGill 0-8 (2f, 2tp), Nathan Feeney 1-0, Conal Gallagher 0-2, Shay Rafter 0-2 (1f), Kristian Healy 0-1, Josh Obahor 0-1	Referee: Ian Howley (Dublin)

22 March 2026 Round 7	Carlow	4-22 (34) – (11) 2-5	Leitrim	Carlow
13:00 GMT (UTC+0)		(HT: 1-11 - 2-3)		Venue: Netwatch Cullen Park
	Pts: Ross Dunphy 0-5, Conor Doyle 0-5 (1tp), Colm Hulton 1-1, Lee Walker 0-4, John Phiri 1-0, John Murphy 1-0, Jamie Clarke 1-0, Mikey Bambrick 0-2, Liam Gavin 0-2, Chris Blake 0-2 (tpf), Padhraig Bolger 0-1	Report	Pts: Michael McKiernan 1-0, Fergal McLoughlin 1-0, Ryan O'Rourke 0-3 (2f), Barry McNulty 0-1, Jack Kelly 0-1	Referee: Chris Maguire (Cavan)

22 March 2026 Round 7	Longford	2-21 (27) – (26) 2-20	Wicklow	Longford
13:00 GMT (UTC+0)		(HT: 0-9 - 2-9)		Venue: Pearse Park
	Pts: Dylan Farrell 0-7 (1tp, 1tpf), Oisín O'Toole 1-1, Paddy Moran 1-1, Daniel Reynolds 0-4, Joseph Hagan 0-3, Oran Kenny 0-2, Peter Lynn 0-1, Dessie Reynolds 0-1, Cian Brady 0-1	Report	Pts: Padraig O'Toole 1-3, Oisin McGraynor 1-2 (1f), Christopher O'Brien 0-4 (1tp), Eoin Darcy 0-3 (1f), Kevin Quinn 0-3, Mark Jackson 0-2 (2'45), Dean Healy 0-2, Jonathan Carlin 0-1	Referee: Liam Devenney (Mayo)

22 March 2026 Round 7	Tipperary	4-19 (31) – (18) 0-18	Waterford	Thurles
13:00 GMT (UTC+0)		(HT: 3-11 - 0-10)		Venue: Semple Stadium
	Pts: Sean O'Connor 3-4 (2f, 1tp), Cian Smith 0-7 (2f), Joe Higgins 1-0, Daithí Hogan 0-2, Paudie Feehan 0-2, Mark Russell 0-2, Charlie King 0-1, James Morris 0-1	Report	Pts: Conor Murray 0-4 (1tp), Simon Burns 0-4 (2tpf), Stephen Curry 0-3 (1f), Adam Murray 0-2, Dermot Ryan 0-2 (1f), Liam Mulligan 0-1, Michael O'Brien 0-1 (f), Alan Dunwoody 0-1	Referee: David Murnane (Cork)

=== Final ===
TG4

28 March 2026
17:00 GMT (UTC+0)
Final

Report

Carlow	1-24 (27) – (24) 2-18 (a.e.t.)	Longford
(HT: 0-12 - 1-9) (FT: 1-17 - 2-14)
Pts: Ross Dunphy 1-3, Liam Gavin 0-4 (3f), Conor Doyle 0-4 (2f), Chris Blake 0-4 (1f), Pádraig Bolger 0-3, Eoghan Ruth 0-2 (tp), Lee Walker 0-2, Colm Hulton 0-1, Jamie Clarke 0-1		Pts: Oran Kenny 1-2, Dessie Reynolds 0-5 (1tp), Dylan Farrell 0-4 (3f), Oisín O'Toole 1-0, Matthew Carey 0-3 (2f), Daniel Reynolds 0-2, Joseph Hagan 0-1, Liam Glennon 0-1

Croke Park, Dublin
Referee: Kevin Faloon (Armagh)

=== Scoring Statistics ===
Rank	Player	Team	Tally	Total	Matches	Average
1	Seán O'Connor	Tipperary	4-42	54	7	7.71
2	Chris Blake	Carlow	2-36	42	8	5.25
3	Cian Smith	Tipperary	0-36	36	7	5.14
3	Joseph McGill	London	0-36	36	7	5.14
5	Dominic McEnhill	Antrim	0-32	32	7	4.57
6	Mark Jackson	Wicklow	0-31	31	7	4.43
6	Dylan Farrell	Longford	2-25	31	7	4.43
8	Colm Hulton	Carlow	1-27	30	8	3.75
9	Matthew Carey	Longford	2-23	29	8	3.63
10	Barry McNulty	Leitrim	1-25	28	5	5.60
10	Oran Kenny	Longford	1-25	28	8	3.50
10	Eoin Darcy	Wicklow	2-22	28	7	4.00

=== Scoring Events ===
- Widest winning margin: 23 points
  - Carlow 4-22 – 2-05 Leitrim
- Most goals in a match: 6
  - Carlow 4-22 – 2-05 Leitrim
- Most points in a match: 42
  - London 0-21 – 0-21 Tipperary
  - Wicklow 2-26 – 0-16 London
- Most goals by one team in a match: 4
  - Antrim 4-18 – 0-11 Waterford
  - Carlow 4-22 – 2-05 Leitrim
- Most points by one team in a match: 27
  - Longford 1-27 – 1-14 Antrim
- Highest aggregate score: 53 points
  - Longford 2-21 – 2-20 Wicklow
- Lowest aggregate score: 23 points
  - Wicklow 0-14 – 0-09 Waterford
