= Young Footballer of the Year =

Young Footballer of the Year may refer to:

- GAA/GPA Young Footballer of the Year, an annual award presented to a Gaelic football player in Ireland
- PFA Young Player of the Year, an annual award presented to an association football player in England

== See also ==
- GAA/GPA Young Hurler of the Year, a similar award presented to a hurler each year
