= Niall Tinney =

Fermanagh Gaelic footballer

Niall Tinney is an Irish Gaelic footballer who plays for his club Irvinestown and the Fermanagh county team.

Tinney was an integral part of Fermanagh's meteoric rise to the latter stages of the 2004 All-Ireland Senior Football Championship.

== Honours ==
- All Stars Young Footballer of the Year: 2004
