= Jordan Morris (Gaelic footballer) =

Irish Gaelic footballer (born 2000)

Personal information
- Born: 2000 (age 25–26) County Cavan, Ireland
- Occupation: Student
- Height: ~5'11'

Sport
- Sport: Gaelic football
- Position: Right corner-forward
Clubs
- Years: Club
- 2017-2018 2019-2021 2022-: Kingscourt Stars; Nobber; Kingscourt Stars
Club titles
- Cavan titles: 1 (also 1 for Meath)
Inter-county
- Years: County
- 2020-: Meath
Inter-county titles
- All-Irelands: 1 (2023 Tailteann Cup)
- NFL: 1 (2026 Division 2)

Jordan Morris (born 2000) is an Irish Gaelic footballer who is best known for his time playing for Meath county football team.

== Biography ==
Born in Kingscourt in 2000, he played for Nobber as a youth before switching to Kingscourt Stars, his childhood home club. He made his debut for Meath senior county team in 2020. In the 2026 Senior Football season, he made 10 appearances for Meath, scoring a record of 2-32 with 2 2-pointers.
