= Dara Sheedy =

Irish Gaelic footballer

Personal information
- Native name: Dara Ó Síoda (Irish)
- Born: 2006 (age 19–20) Bantry, County Cork, Ireland
- Occupation: Student

Sport
- Sport: Gaelic Football
- Position: Centre-forward
Club
- Years: Club
- 2024–present: Bantry Blues
Club titles
- Cork titles: 0
College
- Years: College
- 2024–present: MTU Cork
College titles
- Sigerson titles: 0
Inter-county
- Years: County
- 2026–: Cork
Inter-county titles
- Munster titles: 0
- All-Irelands: 0
- NFL: 0
- All Stars: 0

Dara Sheedy (born 2006) is an Irish Gaelic footballer. At club level, he plays with Bantry Blues and at inter-county level with the Cork senior football team.

== Career ==
Sheedy played Gaelic football at all grades as a student at Coláiste Pobail Bheanntraí. He won a Cork PPS SCFC title in 2022, as well as lining out in various Munster PPS competitions. Sheedy later lined out with MTU Cork in the Sigerson Cup.

At club level, Sheedy first played for Bantry Blues at juvenile and underage levels and won a Carbery U21A FC medal in 2024. He also won a Carbery U21B HC medal that year after lining out with the Cill Mochomóg amalgamation.

Sheedy first appeared on the inter-county scene for Cork as a member of the minor team in 2023. He immediately progressed to the under-20 team. Sheedy made his senior team debut during the 2026 National League.

== Career statistics ==
As of 15 February 2026

Team	Year	National League			Munster		All-Ireland		Total	
Team	Year	Division	Apps	Score	Apps	Score	Apps	Score	Apps	Score
Cork	2026	Division 2	3	0-01	0	0-00	0	0-00	3	0-01
Career total			3	0-01	0	0-00	0	0-00	3	0-01

== Honours ==
Coláiste Pobail Bheanntraí

- Cork PPS Senior C Football Championship: 2022

Cill Mochomóg

- Carbery Under-21 B Hurlng Championship: 2024

Bantry Blues

- Carbery Under-21 A Football Championship: 2024
