= Diarmuid Murtagh =

Football Player

Sport
- Sport: Gaelic football
Club
- Years: Club
- St Faithleachs
College
- Years: College
- NUI Galway
Inter-county
Years	County	Apps (scores)
2014 - Present	Roscommon	42 (19-333)
Inter-county titles
- Connacht titles: 3 (2017, 2019, 2026)

Diarmuid Murtagh (born 1995) is a Gaelic footballer who plays for St Faithleach's and the Roscommon county team.

He played with Roscommon in the 2014 All-Ireland U21 Football Championship, scoring 0-10 in the All-Ireland semi-final defeat of Cork and 2-03 in the final loss to Dublin.

He made his championship debut for the Roscommon county football team in 2014, coming on as a substitute to score 0-02 as they overcame Leitrim in the first round of the 2014 Connacht Senior Football Championship.

He is all-time top scorer since 2025.

== Career statistics ==
As of match played 29 June 2024

Team	Year	National League			Connacht		All-Ireland		Total	
Team	Year	Division	Apps	Score	Apps	Score	Apps	Score	Apps	Score
Roscommon	2014	Division 3			2	0-05	2	0-10	4	0-15
Roscommon	2015	Division 2			2	0-02	1	0-03	3	0-05
Roscommon	2016	Division 1			2	0-04	1	0-01	3	0-05
Roscommon	2017	Division 1			2	0-12	2	0-06	4	0-18
Roscommon	2018	Division 2			2	0-10	4	0-19	6	0-29
Roscommon	2019	Division 1			2	1-12	3	0-05	5	1-17
Roscommon	2020	Division 2			1	0-02	-		1	0-02
Roscommon	2021	Division 1			1	0-01	-		1	0-01
Roscommon	2022	Division 2			2	1-02	1	1-02	3	2-04
Roscommon	2023	Division 1			2	0-06	4	0-16	6	0-22
Roscommon	2024	Division 1			1	0-05	5	1-18	6	1-23
Career total					19	2-61	23	2-80	42	4-141

== See also ==
- Ciarán Murtagh
