= Darragh Beirne =

Mayo Gaelic footballer

Personal information
- Native name: Darragh Ó Beirn (Irish)
- Born: 2006 (age 19–20) Claremorris, County Mayo, Ireland
- Occupation: Student

Sport
- Sport: Gaelic football
- Position: Left corner-back
Club
- Years: Club
- 2024–present: Claremorris
Club titles
- Mayo titles: 0
College
- Years: College
- 2025–present: University of Limerick
College titles
- Sigerson titles: 0
Inter-county*
Years	County	Apps (scores)
2026–	Mayo	6 (3–18)
Inter-county titles
- Connacht titles: 0
- All-Irelands: 1
- NFL: 0
- All Stars: 0
- *Inter County team apps and scores correct as of 10:19, 29 July 2026.

Darragh Beirne (born 2006) is an Irish Gaelic footballer. At club level he plays with Claremorris and at inter-county level with the Mayo senior football team.

== Career ==
Born and raised in Claremorris, County Mayo, Beirne first played Gaelic football at juvenile and underage levels with the Claremorris club, before progressing to adult level.

Beirne attended St Colman's College in Claremorris and lined out in all grades of Gaelic football during his time there. He was joint-captain of their Connacht PPS SAFC-winning team, however, St Colman's were later beaten by St Patrick's College, Maghera in the 2025 Hogan Cup final. Beirne continued his Gaelic football development as a student at the University of Limerick.

At inter-county level, Beirne first appeared for Mayo as a member of the minor team that won the Conancht MFC title in 2023. He immediately progressed to the under-20 team and won a Connacht U20FC medal in 2025. Beirne ended the season by being named on the U20 Team of the Year.

Beirne made his debut in a National League game against Galway in January 2026. He lined out at right corner-forward when Mayo played Kerry in the 2026 All-Ireland SFC final and ended the game with an All-Ireland SFC medal, after scoring 1–03 from play, in the 1–20 to 1–17 win, with Mayo claiming their first title in 75 years.

== Career statistics ==
As of 26 July 2026

Team	Year	National League			Connacht		All-Ireland		Total	
Team	Year	Division	Apps	Score	Apps	Score	Apps	Score	Apps	Score
Mayo	2026	Division 1	5	2-09	0	0-00	6	3-18	11	5-27
Career total			5	2-09	0	0-00	6	3-18	11	5-27

== Honours ==
St Colman's College

- Connacht PPS Senior A Football Championship (1): 2025 (c)

University of Limerick

- Sigerson Cup (1): 2026

Mayo

- All-Ireland Senior Football Championship (1): 2026
- Connacht Under-20 Football Championship (1): 2025
- Connacht Minor Football Championship (1): 2023
