= Diarmuid O'Connor (Mayo Gaelic footballer) =

Irish Gaelic footballer

Personal information
- Native name: Diarmuid Ó Conchubhair (Irish)
- Born: 10 January 1995 Castlebar, County Mayo, Ireland
- Height: 6 ft 2 in (188 cm)

Sport
- Sport: Gaelic football
- Position: Wing forward
Club
- Years: Club
- 2012—: Ballintubber
Club titles
	Football	Hurling
Mayo titles	3 Mayo Senior titles	
Inter-county
- Years: County
- 2014–: Mayo
Inter-county titles
- NFL: 2 Division 1 titles 1 Division 2 title
- All Stars: 2 YPOTY awards
Connacht Titles	4 Senior titles 1 U21 title 1 Minor title	
All-Ireland Titles	1 Senior title 1 U21 title 1 Minor title 1 Sigerson title	

Diarmuid O'Connor (born 10 January 1995) is an Irish sportsperson. He has played Gaelic football at senior level for both his club Ballintubber and for Mayo.

== Football ==
In 2013 O'Connor won the All Ireland Minor Football Championship with Mayo.

In 2014, at the age of 19, he made his Senior Championship debut for Mayo in New York.

In 2015 O'Connor won the Sigerson Cup with Dublin City University.

Diarmuid was awarded the GAA/GPA Young Footballer of the Year in 2015 and 2016.

In 2016 he won the All Ireland U21 Football Championship with Mayo and was also awarded u21 Footballer of the Year that year.

In 2019 Diarmuid was named captain of the Mayo Senior Football team. He led Mayo to a NFL Division 1 title that year.

On 26 July 2026 O'Connor won the 2026 All-Ireland Football Championship with Mayo.

Sporting positions
Preceded by Colin O'Riordan (Tipperary)	U21 Footballer of the Year; 2016	Succeeded by Aaron Byrne (Dublin)
