= Ethan Doherty =

Gaelic footballer

Personal information
- Born: 2001 (age 24–25)

Sport
- Sport: Gaelic football
- Position: Wing forward
Club
- Years: Club
- 2019–: Glen
Club titles
- Derry titles: 3
- Ulster titles: 2
- All-Ireland Titles: 1
Inter-county
- Years: County
- 2020–: Derry
Inter-county titles
- Ulster titles: 2
- All-Irelands: 0
- NFL: 1
- All Stars: 0

Ethan Doherty (born 2001) is a Gaelic footballer for Glen and the Derry county team.

== Playing career ==
=== College ===
In 2020, Doherty was captain of the St Patrick's College, Maghera team that reached the final of the MacRory Cup. The final against St Colman's, Newry was due to take place on 17 March. However the COVID-19 pandemic caused all GAA activity to be suspended, and the match was indefinitely postponed. On 29 September, after unsuccessful efforts to play the match, the final was cancelled and the trophy was shared between the two finalists.

=== Club ===
Doherty joined the Glen senior team in 2019, and the club reached the county final for the first time. On 20 October, Doherty was at wing back for the final against Magherafelt. Magherafelt won the match by 0–12 to 0–11.

Glen reached the county final again in 2021, where they faced defending champions Slaughtneil on 7 November. Glen were nine-point winners to win their first senior championship. Glen reached the semi-final of the Ulster Senior Football Championship, suffering an extra-time loss to eventual All-Ireland champions Kilcoo.

On 23 October 2022, Doherty scored two points as Glen beat Slaughtneil in the county final for the second consecutive year. Doherty scored a goal in Glen's Ulster quarter-final win over Errigal Ciarán, and the club subsequently reached the Ulster final for the first time. The Ulster final took place on 11 December 2022, with Glen coming up against defending champions Kilcoo. Glen won the match by 1–12 to 1–6, with Doherty scoring a point. Doherty scored two points in the All-Ireland semi-final win over Moycullen as Glen reached the All-Ireland final. The final against Kilmacud Crokes took place on 23 January 2023. Kilmacud won the match by 1–11 to 1–9. Doherty was later named on the team of the club championship for his performances during the season.

Glen faced Magherafelt in 2023 for their third Derry final in a row. A strong second half from Glen helped them to their third successive championship. Glen went on to contest their second Ulster final, this time against Scotstown. Doherty scored a point as Glen defended their Ulster title. Glen faced Kilmacud Crokes in the All-Ireland semi-final in a rematch of the previous year's final. Doherty scored a late goal as Glen won by a point to reach their second All-Ireland final. In the All-Ireland final against St Brigid's on 21 January 2024, Doherty scored a point, with Glen staging a late comeback to win the All-Ireland title for the first time.

=== Inter-county ===
==== Minor and under-20 ====
On 13 July 2018, Doherty was at wing-forward for the Derry minor team against Monaghan in the Ulster final. Monaghan won the match by 1–9 to 0–9, with Doherty scoring a point.

On 14 July 2019, Doherty was on the bench for the Ulster under-20 final against Tyrone. Doherty was brought on as a second-half substitute as Tyrone ran out comfortable winners.

==== Senior ====
Doherty made his debut for the Derry senior team on 17 October 2020, starting as a wing forward in a National League win over Longford. Doherty made his championship debut on 1 November, scoring a point in an Ulster championship loss to Armagh.

On 19 June 2021, Doherty scored two points against Offaly in the Division 3 league final. Derry won the match by 0–21 to 1–6.

On 1 May 2022, Doherty scored a point as Derry inflicted an eleven-point defeat on reigning All-Ireland champions Tyrone. Derry went on to reach their first Ulster final in eleven years with a win over Monaghan. The Ulster final took place on 29 May, with Derry facing Donegal. Doherty started at wing forward as Derry claimed an extra-time victory to win their first provincial title since 1998. On 9 July, Doherty started the All-Ireland semi-final against Galway, where Derry suffered a five-point defeat. Doherty was nominated for an All-Star for the first time at the end of the season, and was also nominated for the Young Footballer of the Year award.

After helping Derry achieve promotion to Division 1, Doherty started the Division 2 league final against Dublin on 2 April 2023. Dublin won the match by 4–6 to 0–11. Doherty played in his second Ulster final on 14 May, as Derry beat Armagh on penalties to defend the Ulster championship. On 16 July, Doherty played in the All-Ireland semi-final loss to defending champions Kerry. At the end of the season, Doherty was named Young Footballer of the Year.

In the 2024 league, Derry topped the table, qualifying for the final against Dublin. Doherty started the final at wing forward, and scored a point as the match ended in a draw after extra-time. Doherty scored his penalty in the shoot-out as Derry won the league for the first time since 2008.

== Honours ==
Derry

- Ulster Senior Football Championship: 2022, 2023
- National Football League: 2024
- National Football League Division 3: 2021

Glen

- All-Ireland Senior Club Football Championship: 2023–24
- Ulster Senior Club Football Championship: 2022, 2023
- Derry Senior Football Championship: 2021, 2022, 2023

St Patrick's College Maghera

- MacRory Cup: 2020 (c) (shared)

Individual

- GAA/GPA Young Footballer of the Year: 2023
- AIB GAA Club Football Team of the Year: 2023
