= Colm O'Callaghan =

Irish Gaelic footballer

Personal information
- Native name: Colm Ó Ceallacháin (Irish)
- Born: 1999 (age 26–27) Ovens, County Cork, Ireland
- Occupation: Student

Sport
- Sport: Gaelic Football
- Position: midfield
Club
- Years: Club
- Éire Óg
Club titles
- Cork titles: 0
College
- Years: College
- University College Cork
College titles
- Sigerson titles: 0
Inter-county
Years	County	Apps (scores)
2020-	Cork	0 (0-00)
Inter-county titles
- Munster titles: 0
- All-Irelands: 0
- NFL: 0
- All Stars: 0

Colm O'Callaghan (born 1999) is an Irish Gaelic footballer who plays for Cork Senior Championship club Éire Óg and at inter-county level with the Cork senior football team. He usually lines out as a midfielder.

== Honours ==
Cork

- National Football League Division 3 (1): 2020
- All-Ireland Under-20 Football Championship (1): 2019
- Munster Under-20 Football Championship (1): 2019
