= Conor O'Donnell (Carndonagh footballer) =

Irish Gaelic footballer

Personal information
- Born: 2000 or 2001 (age 25–26)
- Height: 6 ft 0 in (183 cm)

Sport
- Sport: Gaelic football
- Position: Half-forward
Club
- Years: Club
- 201?–: Carndonagh
Inter-county
- Years: County
- 2020–: Donegal
- Ulster titles: 1

Conor O'Donnell is an Irish Gaelic footballer who plays for Carndonagh and the Donegal county team.

He attended Carndonagh CS and played for Coláistí Inis Eoghain, a combination of two schools in Ulster competition.

O'Donnell ruptured his anterior cruciate ligament in 2019. He played for his county at minor and under-20 level.

O'Donnell made his senior inter-county debut in the last game of the 2020 National Football League, away to Kerry.

He scored a goal in the 2022 National Football League fixture against Tyrone. It was a man-of-the-match performance and O'Donnell was named in the GAA.ie Football Team of the Week and nominated for Footballer of the Week.

O'Donnell scored a goal in the 2022 Ulster Senior Football Championship semi-final victory over Cavan, less than two minutes after taking to the field as a substitute. He also made a substitute appearance in the final. He made another substitute appearance in the 2022 All-Ireland Senior Football Championship qualifier loss to Armagh.

== Honours ==
Donegal

- Ulster Senior Football Championship: 2025

Individual

- All Star: 0
  - Nominated in 2025
- The Sunday Game Team of the Year: 2025
