= Dara McVeety =

Cavan Gaelic footballer

Personal information
- Native name: Dara Mac an Bhiataigh (Irish)
- Born: 22 September 1993 (age 33)
- Height: 6 ft 0 in (183 cm)

Sport
- Sport: Gaelic Football
- Position: Centre Forward
Club
- Years: Club
- Crosserlough
Inter-county
- Years: County
- 2013–: Cavan
Inter-county titles
- Ulster titles: 1 Minor (2011) 3 U21 (2012, 2013, 2014)
- NFL: 1 (2023)

Dara McVeety (born 22 September 1993) in an Irish Gaelic footballer who plays for the Crosserlough club and the Cavan county team.

== Playing career ==
=== Club ===
On 2 October 2011, Crosserlough faced Drumgoon in the Cavan Intermediate final. McVeety came on as a substitute as Crosserlough lost out by a single point

McVeety captained Crosserlough in 2018 as they reached the final of the Cavan Senior Football Championship. On 21 October, McVeety started at centre back in his first senior county final, where Crosserlough faced Castlerahan. Crosserlough led by six at one stage, but Castlerahan came back to win the final by a point.

Crosserlough won their first championship in 48 years in 2020, but McVeety was not part of that success as he was in Australia. He transferred back to Crosserlough in 2022.

=== Inter-county ===
==== Minor and under-21 ====
On 17 July 2011, McVeety was on the Cavan minor team that faced Armagh in the Ulster final. McVeety scored a point in the 0–12 to 1–6 victory.

McVeety joined the under-21 panel in 2012, but didn't feature in their Ulster final win. On 21 April, McVeety came on as a substitute in the All-Ireland semi-final, where Cavan were edged out by Roscommon.

On 10 April 2013, McVeety started the Ulster Final as Cavan faced Donegal. Cavan were winners on a 0–13 to 1-6 scoreline. On 20 April, McVeety started the All-Ireland semi-final against Cork, scoring a point as Cavan suffered a one-point loss.

Cavan reached the Ulster Final again in 2014, playing Donegal on 9 April. Cavan came out on top once again after a 2–6 to 0–8 win. On 19 April, McVeety started the controversial All-Ireland semi-final loss to eventual winners Dublin.

==== Senior ====
McVeety later joined the senior squad, and on 14 July 2013, he made his championship debut as a substitute in a qualifier win over Fermanagh. On 4 August 2013, McVeety started the All-Ireland quarter-final where Cavan faced Kerry at Croke Park, with the Kingdom coming out winners by six points.

On 3 April 2016, McVeety scored a point against Galway in the National League as Cavan earned promotion to the top flight for the first time in 15 years. On 24 April, McVeety started the Division 2 Final against Tyrone, scoring two points in the five point loss.

McVeety was named Cavan captain at the start of the 2018 season. On 1 April, McVeety was in the half forward line as Cavan faced Roscommon in the National League Division 2 Final. McVeety scored 1-3 as Roscommon won a high-scoring game.

On 9 June 2019, McVeety scored four points against Armagh to send Cavan to the Ulster final. On 23 June 2019, McVeety started at centre forward in the Ulster final, scoring 3 points as Cavan lost to Donegal.

McVeety stepped away from the Cavan panel at the end of 2019, as he was going away travelling.

McVeety rejoined the Cavan panel for the 2023 season, winning his first National Football League title with Cavan in a 0:15 to 1:07 win over Fermanagh in the NFL Final at Croke Park.

== Honours ==
Cavan

- National Football League Div 3 (1): 2023
- Ulster Under-21 Football Championship (3): 2012, 2013, 2014
- Ulster Minor Football Championship (1): 2011

Sporting positions
Preceded by Killian Clarke	Cavan Senior Football Captain; 2018	Succeeded by Raymond Galligan
