= Oisín O'Neill =

Armagh Gaelic footballer

Oisin O'Neill
Personal information
- Occupation: Teacher

Sport
- Sport: Gaelic Football
Club
- Years: Club
- Crossmaglen
Inter-county
- Years: County
- Armagh

Oisin O'Neill is a Gaelic footballer who plays for the Crossmaglen club and at senior level for the Armagh county team. In January 2024, he made his first inter-county appearance since picking up a long-term injury that kep him out of the team for the previous year and a half. His brother Rian plays alongside him for Armagh and Crossmaglen.
