= Luke Fahy =

Irish Gaelic footballer

Personal information
- Native name: Lúc Ó Fathaigh (Irish)
- Born: 1998 (age 27–28) Ballincollig, County Cork, Ireland
- Occupation: Financial analyst

Sport
- Sport: Gaelic Football
- Position: Left wing-back
Club
- Years: Club
- 2016–present: Ballincollig
Club titles
- Cork titles: 0
College
- Years: College
- 2017–2021: University College Cork
College titles
- Sigerson titles: 0
Inter-county
- Years: County
- 2022–present: Cork
Inter-county titles
- Munster titles: 0
- All-Irelands: 0
- NFL: 0
- All Stars: 0

Luke Fahy (born 1998) is an Irish Gaelic footballer and hurler. At club level he plays with Ballincollig and at inter-county level with the Cork senior football team.

== Career ==
Fahy played Gaelic football at all grades as a student at Coláiste Choilm in Ballincollig, including in the Simcox Cup and Corn Uí Mhuirí. At club level, Fahy has lined out as a dual player with Ballincollige. He won a Cork IHC medal in 2018, following a 2–16 to 1–15 win over Blackrock in the final.

Fahy first appeared on the inter-county scene for Cork as a member of the minor team in 2016. He was not on the under-20 panel for personal reasons, but made his senior team debut in 2022.

== Honours ==
Ballincollig

- Cork Intermediate Hurling Championship: 2018
