= GAA/GPA Young Footballer of the Year =

Annual Gaelic football award

- Sport: Gaelic football
- Competition: All-Ireland Senior Championship
- Country: Ireland
- Presented by: GAA and GPA

History
- First award: 1997
- Editions: 28
- First winner: Mike Frank Russell
- Most recent: Finnbarr Roarty

The GAA & GPA All Stars Young Footballer of the Year (often called the All Stars Young Footballer of the Year, or simply Young Footballer of the Year) is an annual award given at the end of the Championship season to a young footballer aged 21 years or younger who is adjudged to have been the best in Gaelic football.

== Winners listed by year ==
Year	Player	County	Club
2025	Finnbarr Roarty	Donegal	Naomh Conaill
2024	Oisín Conaty	Armagh	Tír na nÓg
2023	Ethan Doherty	Derry	Watty Graham's, Glen
2022	Jack Glynn	Galway	Claregalway
2021	Oisín Mullin	Mayo	Kilmaine
2020	Oisín Mullin	Mayo	Kilmaine
2019	Seán O'Shea	Kerry	Kenmare Shamrocks
2018	David Clifford	Kerry	Fossa
2017	Con O'Callaghan	Dublin	Cuala
2016	Diarmuid O'Connor	Mayo	Ballintubber
2015	Diarmuid O'Connor	Mayo	Ballintubber
2014	Ryan McHugh	Donegal	Cill Chartha
2013	Jack McCaffrey	Dublin	Clontarf
2012	Cillian O'Connor	Mayo	Ballintubber
2011	Cillian O'Connor	Mayo	Ballintubber
2010	Aidan Walsh	Cork	Kanturk
2009	Michael Murphy	Donegal	Glenswilly
2008	Tommy Walsh	Kerry	Kerins O'Rahilly's
2007	Killian Young	Kerry	Renard
2006	Keith Higgins	Mayo	Ballyhaunis
2005	Aaron Kernan	Armagh	Crossmaglen Rangers
2004	Niall Tinney	Fermanagh	Irvinestown St Molaise
2003	Seán Cavanagh	Tyrone	Moy Tír Na nÓg
2002	Rónán Clarke	Armagh	Pearse Óg
2001	Cormac McAnallen	Tyrone	Eglish St Patrick's
2000	Joe Bergin	Galway	Mountbellew–Moylough
1999	Philip Clifford	Cork	Bantry Blues
1998	Michael Donnellan	Galway	Dunmore MacHales
1997	Mike Frank Russell	Kerry	Laune Rangers

== Breakdown of winners ==
=== By county ===
County	Number of wins	Winning years
Mayo	7	2006, 2011, 2012, 2015, 2016, 2020, 2021
Kerry	5	1997, 2007, 2008, 2018, 2019
Donegal	3	2009, 2014, 2025
Galway	3	1998, 2000, 2022
Armagh	3	2002, 2005, 2024
Tyrone	2	2001, 2003
Cork	2	1999, 2010
Dublin	2	2013, 2017
Fermanagh	1	2004
Derry	1	2023

=== By province ===
Province	Number of wins	Winning years
Connacht	10	1998, 2000, 2006, 2011, 2012, 2015, 2016, 2020, 2021, 2022
Ulster	10	2001, 2002, 2003, 2004, 2005, 2009, 2014, 2023, 2024, 2025
Munster	7	1997, 1999, 2007, 2008, 2010, 2018, 2019
Leinster	2	2013, 2017
