= Sam Callinan =

Mayo Gaelic footballer

Personal information
- Native name: Somhairle Ó Callanáin (Irish)
- Born: 2003 (age 22–23) Kilkenny, Ireland
- Occupation: Student
- Height: 6 ft 1 in (185 cm)

Sport
- Sport: Gaelic football
- Position: Right wing-back
Club
- Years: Club
- 2021–present: Ballina Stephenites
Club titles
- Mayo titles: 3
College
- Years: College
- 2022–2026: University College Dublin
College titles
- Sigerson titles: 0
Inter-county
- Years: County
- 2021–: Mayo
Inter-county titles
- Connacht titles: 0
- All-Irelands: 1
- NFL: 1
- All Stars: 1

Sam Callinan (born 2003) is an Irish Gaelic footballer. At club level he plays with Ballina Stephenites and at inter-county level with the Mayo senior football team.

== Career ==
Born in Kilkenny, Callinan's family moved to Ballina, County Mayo when he was three years old. He participated in a number of sports as a teenager, including soccer, athletics and rugby with Ballina RFC, however, he committed to Gaelic football from the age of 18. Callinan was part of the Ballina Stephenites team that won three consecutive Mayo SFC titles between 2024 and 2026.

Callinan attended St Muredach's College in Ballina and lined out in all grades of Gaelic football during his time there. He continued his Gaelic football development during his time as a student at University College Dublin, and was part of the university's Sigerson Cup team.

At inter-county level, Callinan first appeared for Mayo as a member of the minor team in 2020. He was later part of the under-20 team that lost consecutive Connacht U20FC finals in 2021 and 2022 during his three years with the team. Callinan was named on the U20 Team of the Year in 2022.

Callinan was just 18-years-old when he was called up to the senior team in 2021, however, his debut season was impacted by an injury. He remained on the panel for the next few years and won a National League medal in April 2023, following Mayo's 0–14 to 0–11 win over Galway in the final. Callinan lined out at right wing-back when Mayo played Kerry in the 2026 All-Ireland SFC final and ended the game with an All-Ireland SFC medal following the 1–20 to 1–17 win, with Mayo claiming their first title in 75 years.

== Honours ==
Ballina Stephenites

- Mayo Senior Football Championship (3): 2023, 2024, 2025

Mayo

- All-Ireland Senior Football Championship (1): 2026
- National Football League: (1) 2023
