= Paul Cassidy =

Irish Gaelic footballer

Personal information
- Born: 2000 (age 25–26)

Sport
- Sport: Gaelic football
- Position: Centre forward
Club
- Years: Club
- Bellaghy
Inter-county
- Years: County
- 2020–: Derry
Inter-county titles
- Ulster titles: 2
- All-Irelands: 0
- NFL: 1
- All Stars: 0

Paul Cassidy (born 2000) is an Irish Gaelic footballer who plays as a forward for Bellaghy Wolfe Tones and the Derry county team.

== Playing career ==
=== Club ===
Cassidy captained Bellaghy to the Derry Minor Football Championship title in 2018, beating Lavey in the final. Bellaghy went on to represent Derry in the Ulster Minor Club Football Championship. Cassidy scored three points against Dunloy, 1–2 against Inniskeen, and 0–3 against St Eunan's as Bellaghy reached the final. The final took place on 1 January 2019. Cassidy scored 1–2 and lifted the cup after Bellaghy's 6–11 to 0–8 win over Crossmaglen Rangers.

=== Inter-county ===
==== Under-20 ====
On 14 July 2019, Cassidy was at corner forward for the Ulster under-20 final against Tyrone. Cassidy scored a point but was forced off injured after 13 minutes. Tyrone went on to win the match by 4–13 to 1–10.

==== Senior ====
Cassidy joined the Derry senior team in 2020, making his National League debut on 17 October, scoring 1–1 after coming on as a late substitute against Longford. Cassidy made his championship debut on 1 November, coming on as a substitute in an Ulster-quarter final loss to Armagh.

On 19 June 2021, Derry faced Offaly in the Division 3 league final. Cassidy was brought on as a second-half substitute as Derry were 0–21 to 1–6 winners. On 11 July, Cassidy made his first championship start against Donegal in the Ulster quarter-final. Derry lost the match by a point, with Donegal taking the lead for the first time in injury time.

On 1 May 2022, Cassidy was in the half-forward line as Derry beat reigning All-Ireland champions Tyrone by eleven points in the Ulster quarter-final. Derry went on to reach their first Ulster final in eleven years with a win over Monaghan, with Cassidy scoring two points. The Ulster final took place on 29 May, with Derry facing Donegal. Cassidy scored a point as Derry claimed an extra-time victory to win their first provincial title since 1998. Cassidy scored 1–1 in the All-Ireland quarter final win over Clare, as Derry set up a semi-final against Galway. Derry's season ended at the semi-final stage as Galway were five-point winners.

On 21 January 2023, Cassidy scored a point and was named man of the match as Derry won the Dr McKenna Cup, beating Tyrone in the final. Derry secured promotion to Division 1 after winning their first six games, and went on to face Dublin in the Division 2 final on 2 April. Cassidy scored two points, but Dublin won the match by 4–6 to 0–11. In the Ulster Championship, Cassidy scored 1–2 against Fermanagh, and two points against Monaghan as Derry reached back-to-back provincial finals. In the Ulster final on 14 May, Cassidy had his penalty saved in the shoot-out, but Derry still beat Armagh, defending the Ulster title. On 16 July, Cassidy scored two points as Derry lost the All-Ireland semi-final to defending champions Kerry. At the end of the season, Cassidy was nominated for an All-Star award for the first time.

In the 2024 league, Derry topped the table, qualifying for the final against Dublin. Cassidy started the final at wing forward, and Derry won the league for the first time since 2008 after a penalty shoot-out win.

== Honours ==
Derry

- Ulster Senior Football Championship: 2022, 2023
- National Football League: 2024
- National Football League Division 3: 2021
- Dr McKenna Cup: 2023

Bellaghy

- Ulster Minor Club Football Championship: 2018 (c)
- Derry Minor Football Championship: 2018 (c)
