= David Garland =

David Garland may refer to:

== Sports ==
- David Garland (Gaelic footballer) (born 1998), Irish Gaelic footballer and umpire
- David Garland (English footballer) (born 1948), English footballer

== Arts ==
- David Garland (musician) (born 1954), singer-songwriter, composer, and radio personality
- David Siteman Garland, American author

== Education ==
- David E. Garland (born 1947), Dean of George W. Truett Theological Seminary
- David W. Garland (born 1955), professor of law and sociology

== Other ==
- David S. Garland (1769–1841), U.S. Representative from Virginia
- David John Garland (1864–1939), Anglican clergyman in Queensland, Australia
