= 2023 Sigerson Cup =

Gaelic football competition

- Dates: 10 January - February 2023
- Teams: 16
- Sponsor: Electric Ireland
- Champions: University College Cork (24th title); Jack Murphy (captain); Billy Morgan (manager)
- Runners-up: University of Limerick; Emmet McMahon (captain); Declan Brouder (manager)

Tournament statistics
- Matches played: 27
- Goals scored: 76 (2.81 per match)
- Points scored: 592 (21.93 per match)
- Top scorer(s): David Garland (5-20)

The 2023 Sigerson Cup was the 110th staging of the Sigerson Cup since its establishment by the Gaelic Athletic Association in 1910. It was sponsored by Electric Ireland, and known as the Electric Ireland HE GAA Sigerson Cup for sponsorship purposes. The draw for the group stage fixtures took place on 14 December 2022. The cup ran from 10 January to 16 February 2023.

University of Galway entered the Sigerson Cup as the defending champions, however, they were beaten by University of Limerick in the quarter-finals.

The Sigerson Cup final was played on 15 February 2023 at the SETU Waterford Complex, between UNiversity College Cork and University of Limerick, in what was their first ever meeting in the final. University College Cork won the match by 1–16 to 0–16 to claim their 24th Sigerson Cup title overall and a first title in four years.

University College Dublin's David Garland was the top scorer with 5-20.

== Results ==
=== Round 1 ===
10 January 2023 Round 1	SETU Carlow	0-08 - 0-14	St Mary's University College	SETU Carlow Grounds
	C Farrell 0-4 (3fs), E Murtagh, C Hulton 0-2 each.	Report	S Rock 0-4 (2fs), C McConville 0-3(fs), D Magee, C Murphy 0-2 each, M McCarville, S Donnelly, M Og McGleenan 0-1 each.

10 January 2023 Round 1	ATU Donegal	1-07 - 4-15	DCU Dóchas Éireann	Convoy Grounds
	K McGroddy 1-0; J McSharry 0-2; L Gaughan, C O’Donnell, M McAteer 0-1; J Bradley-Walsh 0-1, 1f.	Report	R Finnerty 2-3, 1f; L O'Dell 1-4; C Corbett 1-2; S Walsh 0-2, 2f; A Beirne, M Costello, P Hughes, S Jones 0-1.

10 January 2023 Round 1	Queen's University, Belfast	1-12 - 1-11	Ulster University	The Dub
	L Donnelly (1-2, 1f), D Higgins (0-3), D Baker (0-2), O Mallon (0-1), T Bogue (0-1), P Purcell (0-1m), F Canavan (0-1) and P McGrane (0-1)	Report	C Cush (0-3f), R Magill (1-0), ADonaghy (0-2), D Canavan (0-1m), C McColgan (0-1), R Jones (0-1), J Largo Elis (0-1), B McCarron (0-1) and O Murdock (0-1)

10 January 2023 Round 1	MTU Cork	0-13 - 2-11	University College Dublin	MTU Cork Grounds
	R O'Donovan (0-10, 8 frees, 1 45); A O’Shea, D O’Connor (free), S Walsh (0-1 each).	Report	D Cregg (1-5, 0-4 frees); D Garland (1-3, 0-1 mark); D Moriarty, B O’Carroll, C Feely (0-1 each).

11 January 2023 Round 1	Technological University Dublin	1-13 - 0-09	ATU Galway	TU Dublin, Grangegorman
	M Lavin 0-5 (2f), K Callaghan 1-0, R O’Dwyer 0-2 (2f), S Cunnane 0-2, F O’Shea, R Deegan, K McGinnis, D Campion 0-1 each.	Report	D Farrell 0-4 (4f), D Ruane 0-2, N Grainger (f), J Foley, C Reed 0-1 each.

11 January 2023 Round 1	University of Galway	3-10 - 1-06	Maynooth University	Dangan Grounds
	T Culhane 1-4 (0-2f, 0-1m), P O’Donnell 1-1, C Sweeney 1-0, M Tierney 0-2, S O’Flynn 0-1, P Kelly 0-1, C Monaghan 0-1.	Report	D Kirwan 1-2 (0-2f), D Walsh 0-1f, R Kinsella 0-1, S O’Sullivan 0-1f, D Hanafin 0-1.

11 January 2023 Round 1	ATU Sligo	4-06 - 0-12	MTU Kerry	ATU Sligo Grounds
	J Davitt (2-0, 1-0 pen), A Kelleghan (1-1), J Keaney (1-0), M Barrett (0-2, 2f), R O'Rourke (0-1), O McLoughlin (0-1, 1f), C McGahon (0-1)	Report	T Brosnan (0-5, 4f, 1'45'), A Darmody (0-2), G Vaughan (0-1), M Nolan (0-1), K Evans (0-1), C Frayne (0-1), R O'Grady (0-1).

11 January 2023 Round 1	University College Cork	0-10 - 2-07	University of Limerick	The Mardyke
	S Quilter (0-4, 0-2 frees, 0-1 ‘45); S Merritt, F Herlihy, K Falvey, S O’Connor (0-1 mark), M Cronin (free), D Geaney (0-1 each).	Report	P Keaney (0-4, 0-1 free); Paul Walsh (pen), P Matthews (1-0 each); J Coyne, C Downes, A Griffin (0-1 each).

=== Round 2A ===
17 January 2023 Round 2A	University of Limerick	1-17 - 3-11; Penalties: 2-3	Technological University Dublin	UL Grounds
	P Walsh 0-5 (2f, 1m); P Keaney 0-4 (2f) D Cashman 1-0; M Lenehan, E McMahon (1f) 0-2 each; J Hayes, C Downes, B McNamara, A Griffin 0-1 each.	Report	K Callaghan 2-2; S Guiden (0-3f) 0-5; C Grimes 1-0; C Hickey 0-2; F O’Shea, K McGinnis 0-1 each.

19 January 2023 Round 2A	University College Dublin	1-06 - 2-11	University of Galway	Belfield Grounds
	D Garland 1-5 (0-4f, 0-1 mark), D Cregg 0-1.	Report	M Tierney 0-7 (4f), C Sweeney 1-1, T Culhane 1-0, M McInerney (mark), P Kelly (f), D Hunt 0-1 each.

19 January 2023 Round 2A	ATU Sligo	0-06 - 1-10	St Mary's University College	ATU Sligo Grounds
	Aaron Kelleghan (0-3, 3f), Joseph Keaney (0-2), DJ Earley (0-1, 1 '45')	Report	Cormac Murphy (1-2), Sean Rock (0-2, 1f), Charlie Smyth (0-1, '45'), Jude Campbell (0-1), Danny Magee (0-1), Michael McCallan (0-1), Matt Óg McGleenan (0-1), Dara O'Callaghan (0-1)

20 January 2023 Round 2A	DCU Dóchas	3-14 - 0-05	Queen's University, Belfast	DCU Sportsgrounds
	R Finnerty 2-3 (0-3f), K McGann 1-2, S Walsh 0-3 (3f), C Corbett (f), D Lacey (f), M Costello (f), S O’Donnell, B Carroll, J McGroddy 0-1 each.	Report	R Donnelly (f), L Donnelly (f), 0-2 each, P McGrane 0-1.

=== Round 2B ===
18 January 2023 Round 2B	ATU Galway	0-08 - 1-12	University College Cork	Tuam Stadium
	N Grainger 0-3 (3 free), J Foley 0-1, C Raftery 0-1, D Ruane 0-1, D Farrell 0-1, G Higgins 0-1.	Report	D Geaney 0-6 (5 free), S O’Connor 1-0, C Begley 0-2, F Herlihy 0-1, B Hartnett 0-1, K Falvey 0-1, M Cronin 0-1.

18 January 2023 Round 2B	SETU Carlow	2-09 - 0-12	MTU Kerry	SETU Carlow Grounds
	E Hackett 2-0, C Farrell 0-3, P O’Driscoll, 0-2, C Doyle, D McDermott, C Hulton, J Moore 0-1 each.	Report	T Brosnan 0-3, 0-2f, E Looney, K Evans, R O’Grady (0-1f) 0-2 each, M Nee, C Frayne, D Lyne 0-1 each.

19 January 2023 Round 2B	Maynooth University	2-11 - 2-14	MTU Cork	National Sports Campus
	D Kirwan (0-6, 3 frees), D Conlon (1-1), R O Giolláin (1-0), S O’Sullivan (0-2, 2 frees), D Hanafin (0-2).	Report	R O’Donovan (0-10, 4 frees, 1 45), L Smith (1-1), P Ring, D O’Connor (1-0 each), E O’Connor, A O’Shea, A Walsh (0-1 each).

22 January 2023 Round 2B	Ulster University	2-11 - 1-13	ATU Donegal	Shamrock Park
	C Cush 1-5, 1-0, 3f; A Gilmore 1-4, 4f; K Gallagher 0-1; D Canavan 0-1	Report	J Bradley-Walsh 0-8, 5f, 45; E Dowling 1-0; K McGroddy 0-2, C O’Donnell and K Dunleavy 0-1; J McGee 0-1, 1f.

=== Round 3 ===
24 January 2023 Round 3	University of Limerick	4-10 - 1-04	SETU Carlow	UL Grounds
	C Downes 2-1; E McMahon 0-5 (1f); A Griffin 1-0; P Keaney 0-2 (1f, 1 ’45); M Lenehan, J Hayes 0-1 each.	Report	C Hulton 0-3; T Griffin 1-0; C Farrell 0-1 (45).

24 January 2023 Round 3	MTU Cork	3-12 - 2-07	ATU Sligo	Clonad Grounds
	R O’Donovan (0-6, 5 frees), E O’Hanlon 1-1, D O’Connor 1-1, D O’Connor 1-0, A O’Shea 0-2, D Buckey 0-1, R Maguire 0-1.	Report	F Ayorinde 2-0, A Kelleghan 0-4, 3 frees, O McLoughlin 0-1, J Keaney 0-1, L Molloy 0-1.

25 January 2023 Round 3	Ulster University	3-10 - 7-08	University College Dublin	Jordanstown Grounds
	C Cush 2-1 (1-0pen), A Gilmore 0-3f, R Jones 1-0, M Gallagher, T Close, K Gallagher, D Magill, C McCrickard 0-1 and J Largo Elis 0-1 each	Report	D Garland 3-3 (1f), D Cregg 2-2 (2f), P Ruttledge 1-1, O Lynch 1-0 (own goal), D McElearney and D Moriarty 0-1 each

25 January 2023 Round 3	University College Cork	0-19 - 3-10; Penalties: 7-6	Queen's University Belfast	National Sports Campus
	M Cronin (0-7, 6 frees); C O'Mahony & D Geaney (0-1f, 0-1m) (0-4 each); S Merritt (0-1f), K Falvey, F Herlihy, R Murphy (0-1).	Report	L Donnelly (3-3, 0-3 frees); R Donnelly (0-3); D Higgins (0-2, 2 frees); O Mallon, T Bogue (0-1).

=== Quarter-finals ===
31 January 2023 Quarter-final	University of Galway	2-10 - 1-15 (aet)	University of Limerick	Dangan Grounds
	M Tierney 0-5 (0-4f), G Davoren 1-1, P Kelly 0-3f, M McInerney 1-0, S Kelly 0-1.	Report	P Keaney 0-7f, P Walsh 1-1, D Cashman 0-2, C Downes 0-2, E McMahon 0-2f, M Lenehan 0-1.

31 January 2023 Quarter-final	DCU Dóchas Éireann	2-12 - 0-09	MTU Cork	DCU Sportsgrounds
	M Costello 0-6 (5f), J Bryant, L O’Dell 1-0 each, S Walsh 0-3 (2f), A Beirne, PJ Masterson, K Quinn 0-1 each.	Report	D Buckley 0-4 (2f), R O’Donovan 0-3 (2f), A O’Shea, D O’Connor 0-1 each.

1 February 2023 Quarter-final	Technological University Dublin	0-16 - 0-15 (aet)	University College Dublin	TU Dublin, Grangegorman
	M Lavin (0-7, 7 frees), R McAllister (0-2), D Campion (0-2), K McGinnis (0-2), R Deegan (0-1), S Cunnane (0-1), L Swan (0-1).	Report	D Garland (0-9, 6 frees), B O’Carroll (0-4), J Lynam (0-1), D Moriarty (0-1).

1 February 2023 Quarter-final	St Mary's University College	1-10 - 1-10; Penalties: 2-3	University College Cork	National Sports Campus
	M Og McGleenan (1-0), Charlie Smyth (1f, 1 ’45’), D O’Callaghan (2f) (0-2 each), C McConville (f), C Murphy, J Campbell, M McCarville, D Trainor, L Hughes (0-1 each).	Report	C O’Mahony (1-3, 0-2f), R Murphy (0-2), S Merritt (’45’), D Geaney (f), K Falvey, F Herlihy, B Curtin (0-1 each).

=== Semi-finals ===
8 February 2023 Semi-final	DCU Dóchas Éireann	0-12 - 3-12	University of Limerick	Netwatch Cullen Park
	O Gallen 0-5 (0-1f), K McGann 0-3, L O’Dell 0-2, P Hughes 0-1, J McGroddy 0-1.	Report	C Downes 1-3, A Griffin 1-1, E McLaughlin 1-0, P Walsh 0-3 (0-1f), P Keaney 0-2 (0-2f), J Hayes 0-1, D Walsh 0-1, M Lenehan 0-1 (0-1f).	Referee: B Cawley (Kildare)

8 February 2023 Semi-final	University College Cork	1-12 - 0-13	Technological University Dublin	Netwatch Cullen Park
	C O’Mahony 0-5 (0-2f), D Geaney 1-0, F Herlihy 0-3, M Cronin 0-1 (0-1f), K Falvey 0-1, B Hartnett 0-1, R Murphy 0-1.	Report	S Cunnane 0-4, S Guiden 0-3, J Flynn 0-2, K Callaghan 0-2, D Campion 0-1, R McAllister 0-1.

=== Final ===
15 February 2023 Final	University of Limerick	0-16 - 1-16	University College Cork	SETU Waterford Grounds
	E McMahon 0-4, P Keaney 0-3 (3f), C Downes 0-2, D Cashman 0-2, J Coyne 0-2, M Lenehan 0-1, J Glynn 0-1, E McLaughlin 0-1.	Report	D Geaney 1-4 (0-3f), M Cronin 0-5 (3f), C O’Mahony 0-2, F Herlihy 0-2, K Falvey 0-1, M O’Gara 0-1, S O’Connor 0-1.	Referee: S Hurson (Tyrone)

== Statistics ==
=== Top scorers ===
Overall

Rank	Player	Club	Tally	Total	Matches	Average
1	David Garland	UCD	5-20	35	4	8.75
2	Ryan O'Donovan	MTU Cork	0-29	29	3	9.66
3	Dylan Geaney	UCC	2-16	22	6	3.66
3	Paul Keaney	University of Limerick	0-22	22	6	3.66
5	Luke Donnelly	Queen's	4-07	19	3	6.33
5	Ciarán Downes	University of Limerick	3-10	19	6	3.16
7	Robert Finnerty	DCU Dóchas Éireann	4-06	18	2	9.00
7	Conor Cush	Ulster University	3-09	18	3	6.00
9	Daire Cregg	UCD	3-08	17	4	4.25
9	Cathail O'Mahony	UCC	1-14	17	6	2.83

In a single game

Rank	Player	Club	Tally	Total	Opposition
1	David Garland	UCD	3-03	12	Ulster University
1	Luke Donnelly	Queen's	3-03	12	UCC
3	Ryan O'Donovan	MTU Cork	0-10	10	UCD
3	Ryan O'Donovan	MTU Cork	0-10	10	Maynooth University
5	Robert Finnerty	DCU Dóchas Éireann	2-03	9	ATU Donegal
5	Robert Finnerty	DCU Dóchas Éireann	2-03	9	Queen's
5	David Garland	UCD	0-09	9	TU Dublin
8	Kevin Callaghan	TU Dublin	2-02	8	University of Limerick
8	Daire Cregg	UCD	2-02	8	Ulster University
8	Conor Cush	Ulster University	1-05	8	ATU Donegal
8	Daire Cregg	UCD	1-05	8	MTU Cork
8	David Garland	UCD	1-05	8	University of Galway
8	Joe Bradley-Walsh	ATU Donegal	0-08	8	Ulster University

== Awards ==
2023 Higher Education GAA Rising Stars Football Team

1. Dylan Foley
2. Páraic Hughes
3. Daniel O'Mahony^{FOTY}
4. Jack Coyne
5. Cian Hanley
6. Darragh Cashman
7. Shane Merritt
8. Bill Carroll
9. Paul Keaney
10. Emmet McMahon
11. Ruairí Murphy
12. Mark Cronin
13. Cathail O'Mahony
14. Darragh Campion
15. Ciaran Downes

== See also ==
- Sigerson Cup (2007, 2020)
