= 2024 All-Ireland Minor Football Championship Tier 2 =

Annual Gaelic football competition

- Dates: 23 May - 15 June 2024
- Teams: 11
- Sponsor: Electric Ireland
- Champions: Kildare (1st title); Evan Boyle (captain); Ruaidhrí Lawlor (captain); Niall Cronin (manager)
- Runners-up: Cavan; Conor Doyle (captain); Seánie Smith (manager)

Tournament statistics
- Matches played: 10
- Goals scored: 30 (3 per match)
- Points scored: 208 (20.8 per match)

The 2024 All-Ireland Minor Football Championship Tier 2 was the inaugural staging of the All-Ireland Minor Football Championship Tier 2 since its establishment by the Gaelic Athletic Association. The championship ran from 23 May to 15 June 2024.

The All-Ireland final was played on 15 June 2024 at Páirc Tailteann in Navan, between Kildare and Cavan, in what was their first ever championship meeting. Kildare won the match by 2-12 to 1-10 to claim their first ever All-Ireland MFC Tier 2.title.

== Participating teams ==
Province	Championship	Teams progressing
Connacht	Connacht Minor Football Championship	Galway, Sligo
Leinster	Leinster Minor Football Championship	Kildare, Louth, Wexford, Wicklow
Munster	Munster Minor Football Championship	Clare
Ulster	Ulster Minor Football Championship	Donegal, Cavan, Monaghan, Tyrone

== Results ==
=== All-Ireland preliminary quarter-finals ===
23 May 2024 Preliminary quarter-final	Monaghan	0-09 - 2-07	Wexford	National Sports Campus
		Report

25 May 2024 Preliminary quarter-final	Clare	1-07 - 2-10	Sligo	Cusack Park

25 May 2024 Preliminary quarter-final	Cavan	2-09 - 2-05	Wicklow	Kingspan Breffni Park

=== All-Ireland quarter-finals ===
1 June 2024 Quarter-final	Galway	1-09 - 1-13	Kildare	Pearse Stadium

1 June 2024 Quarter-final	Sligo	0-07 - 1-14	Donegal	Markievicz Park

1 June 2024 Quarter-final	Louth	1-09 - 4-14	Cavan	Páirc Baile Fiach

3 June 2024 Quarter-final	Tyrone	4-16 - 1-06	Wexford	Garvaghey Centre

=== All-Ireland semi-finals ===
8 June 2024 Semi-final	Kildare	3-12 - 1-13	Donegal	St Tiernach's Park
	P Ryan 2-1; R Kelly 0-5,4f; F Dowling 1-0; E Boyle, C McKevitt (m), D O'Dwyer, A Donegan, H Donnelly, O Deller 0-1 each.	Report	C McCahill 1-3,1f; T Carr 0-3,1f; D O Baoighill 0-2,1f; C O Gallachoir, M Campbell, A Cunnea, C O Baoill, C Doyle 0-1.

8 June 2024 Semi-final	Tyrone	1-10 - 0-16	Cavan	St Tiernach's Park
	E Long 1-1, D Devlin 0-2, P McGoldrick 0-2, L McMurray 0-2, S Corry 0-1, P Colton 0-1.		N Quigley 0-7, O Madden 0-2, U O'Reilly 0-2, C Fallon 0-2, A Hill 0-1, F Brady 0-1, F Crowe 0-1.

=== All-Ireland final ===
15 June 2024 Final	Kildare	2-12 - 1-10	Cavan	Páirc Tailteann
	R Kelly 1-1, H Donnelly 1-0, A Donegan 0-3, D O'Dwyer 0-2 (1 free), E Boyle 0-1, R Lawlor 0-2, P Ryan 0-1, F Dowling 0-1, O Deller 0-1.	Report	N Quigley 1-3 (2 frees), J Shehu 0-3 (2 frees), O Madden 0-3 (3 frees), U O'Reilly 0-1.	Referee: A Coyne (Westmeath)
