= All-Ireland Minor Football Championship Tier 3 =

Third tier Gaelic football competition for players under the age of 17

GAA Football All-Ireland Minor Championship Tier 3
- Current season or competition: 2024 All-Ireland Minor Football Championship Tier 3
- Irish: Craobh Peile Mionúr na hÉireann Sraith 3
- Code: Gaelic football
- Founded: 2024
- Region: Ireland (GAA)
- Trophy: Séamus Heaney Cup
- No. of teams: 13
- Title holders: Down (1st title)
- First winner: Down
- Sponsors: Electric Ireland
- Official website: http://www.gaa.ie/

The GAA Football All-Ireland Minor Championship Tier 3 is an annual inter-county Gaelic football competition organised by the Gaelic Athletic Association (GAA). It is the third tier inter-county Gaelic football competition for male players under the age of 17 in Ireland.

Teams that are eliminated from the early provincial stages of the GAA Football All-Ireland Minor Championship qualify for this championship. 13 teams currently participate.

The All-Ireland final serves as the culmination of a series of games played during the summer months, and the results determine which team receives the Séamus Heaney Cup. The All-Ireland Championship is played on a straight knockout basis whereby once a team loses they are eliminated from the championship.

Down are the current champions after beating Westmeath by 4-13 to 2-17 in the 2024 final.

== History ==
The All-Ireland Minor Football Championship was created in 1929. Various formats were used in the provincial competitions, however, the All-Ireland series was, for many years, confined to the four provincial champions. A change in format resulted in the four provincial runners-up also being allowed entry to the All-Ireland series. A decision at GAA Congress in 2023 allowed for the creation of additional tiered All-Ireland competitions for counties that do not reach the provincial final stage.

== Format ==
=== Qualification ===
Province	Championship	Teams progressing
Britain	n/a	1: London
Connacht	Connacht Minor Football Championship	1: 5th-placed team
Leinster	Leinster Minor Football Championship	5: Bottom-placed group stage teams and beaten preliminary quarter-finalists
Munster	Munster Minor Football Championship	3: 4th, 5th and 6th-placed teams
Ulster	Ulster Minor Football Championship	3: Beaten quarter and semi-finalists

=== Championship ===
There are 13 teams in the All-Ireland Championship. During the course of a championship season 12 games are played comprising five preliminary quarter-finals, four quarter-finals, two semi-finals and a final. The championship is played as a single-elimination tournament. Each game is played as a single leg.

== Trophy ==
The Séamus Heaney Cup is the current prize for winning the championship. Heaney played football with Navan O'Mahonys but was also involved in the coaching of various teams Simonstown Gaels when he retired from playing. The Séamus Heaney Cup was first presented in 1998 as the prize for winning the Leinster Minor Football League. The cup was repurposed in 2024.

== List of finals ==
Year	Winners		Runners-up		Venue	Captain
Year	County	Score	County	Score	Venue	Captain
2024	Down	4-13	Westmeath	2-17	Kingspan Breffni	Barra McEvoy
