= Brendan McCole =

Irish Gaelic footballer

Personal information
- Born: 1997/8 New York, United States

Sport
- Sport: Gaelic football
- Position: Full-back
Club
- Years: Club
- 201?–: St Naul's
College
- Years: College
- c. 2020: DCU
College titles
- Sigerson titles: 1
Inter-county
- Years: County
- 201?–: Donegal
Inter-county titles
- Ulster titles: 2
- All Stars: 1

Brendan McCole (born 1997/8) is an American Gaelic footballer who plays as full-back for St Naul's and the Donegal county team.

McCole was captain when DCU won the 2020 Sigerson Cup, becoming the third Donegal-based player to achieve this distinction, after Jim McGuinness and Christy Toye. Compared favourably to Neil McGee, he was identified early as his eventual successor at inter-county level.

== Early life ==
McCole was born in New York, lived in Rye and has a United States passport. He played basketball and did not kick a Gaelic football before the age of nine. McCole's elder brother and only sibling — Kara — died, aged 21, in 2014, following a workplace machinery accident, when McCole was 16 years of age.

McCole's father Donie — who was born in Greenock, Scotland — played as a wing-back on the Donegal team that won the 1982 All-Ireland Under-21 Football Championship.

Donie and his wife Bernadine — who is originally from Inver — later moved to Mountcharles, where Donie began coaching at the St Naul's club.

== Playing career ==
=== Club ===
McCole previously played as a half-back until his club St Naul's — needing a full-back — positioned him on the edge of the square.

With his club, McCole won the 2019 Donegal Intermediate Football Championship, McCole playing at full-back in the final against Cloich Cheann Fhaola.

=== College ===
McCole studied Education and Training at Dublin City University (DCU) and became captain of the Freshers team that won the All-Ireland title when he was in first year.

McCole later took a master's degree in Business Management. The university team's manager, Paddy Christie, appointed him as captain of the DCU team that participated in the 2020 Sigerson Cup. That team included fellow Donegal player Conor Morrison, Thomas Galligan, Seán Bugler, Shane Carthy, Evan Comerford and Paddy Small (Dublin), Kevin Flynn (Kildare), Brian Stack (Roscommon), Micheál Bannigan and David Garland (Monaghan).

That team won the trophy. It did not concede a goal, with McCole at the centre of its defence. McCole featured on the team of the tournament and DCU awarded him its Sigerson Footballer of the Year. He was the third Donegal player to captain a team to a Sigerson Cup, following Jim McGuinness and Christy Toye.

=== Inter-county ===
McCole played for Donegal at minor and under-21 level.

In the absence of Neil McGee (whose club was involved in the 2018–19 All-Ireland Senior Club Football Championship), McCole played during the 2019 National Football League.

However, in the 2019 National Football League Division Two final against Meath, he lasted 13 minutes before McGee was brought on and Leo McLoone was sent back as additional protection (this was not offered to McCole when he was on the pitch).

At senior level he made substitute appearances in Donegal's first two fixtures of the 2020 National Football League against Mayo and Meath. He did not feature in the next game against Galway. He made a substitute appearance against Dublin but did not feature against Monaghan. Then the COVID-19 pandemic brought play to a halt. Play resumed behind closed doors on 18 October with a home game against Tyrone; McCole did not play. He played the full concluding game of the league campaign (away to Kerry).

McCole was an unexpected inclusion from the start in the final of the 2020 Ulster Senior Football Championship. He was not named in the team but was put in as a late change for Ciarán Thompson. He had not played in either the quarter-final victory against Tyrone or the semi-final victory against Armagh.

McCole started each of Donegal's four fixtures of the 2021 National Football League, against Tyrone, Monaghan, Armagh and Dublin respectively, and scored a point against Dublin at Breffni Park.

In the 2021 Ulster Senior Football Championship, he started the first and last of Donegal's three fixtures against Down in the opening round and against Tyrone in the semi-final and made a substitute appearance against Derry in the quarter-final.

McCole played every minute of the 2022 National Football League. He also played every minute of the 2022 Ulster Senior Football Championship. His regular appearances coincided with an injury to Neil McGee and the Belfast Telegraph said of McCole: "His man-marking skills, adept covering and willingness to launch counter-attacks have earmarked him as one of the most polished players in the Ulster series".

== Personal life ==
As of mid-2022, McCole lived at home in Mountcharles and worked in former team-mate Marty O'Reilly's sports shop in Ballybofey. At this time he had been dating long-distance runner Claire Fagan for four and a half years. Sportspeople he has listed as admiring range from Eliud Kipchoge to Jan Vennegoor of Hesselink. He supports the New York Knicks and has studied the career of Kobe Bryant.

== Honours ==
Donegal

- Ulster Senior Football Championship: 2024, 2025
- National Football League Division 2: 2024

St Naul's

- Donegal Intermediate Football Championship: 2019

DCU

- Sigerson Cup: 2020 (c)

Individual

- All Star: 2025
  - Nominated in 2023, 2024
- The Sunday Game Team of the Year: 2025
