= Darragh Cashman =

Irish Gaelic footballer (born 2002)

Personal information
- Native name: Darragh Ó Ciosáin (Irish)
- Born: 2002 (age 23–24) Millstreet, County Cork, Ireland
- Occupation: Student

Sport
- Sport: Gaelic football
- Position: Right wing-back
Clubs
- Years: Club
- 2020-present 2021-present: Millstreet → Duhallow
Club titles
- Cork titles: 0
College
- Years: College
- 2021-present: University of Limerick
College titles
- Sigerson titles: 0
Inter-county*
| Years | County | Apps (scores) |
| 2024- | Cork | 0 (0-00) |
Inter-county titles
- Munster titles: 0
- All-Irelands: 0
- NFL: 0
- All Stars: 0
- *Inter County team apps and scores correct as of 14:41, 3 June 2024.

Darragh Cashman (born 2002) is an Irish Gaelic footballer. At club level he plays with Millstreet, divisional side Duhallow and at inter-county level with the Cork senior football team.

== Career ==
Cashman first played Gaelic football and hurling to a high standard as a student at Millstreet Community School. His club career began at juvenile and underage levels with Millstreet, before eventually progressing to adult level in 2020. Cashman has also lined out with University of Limerick in the Sigerson Cup and was part of the team beaten by University College Cork in the 2023 final.

Cashman first appeared on the inter-county scene as a member of the Cork minor football team that beat Galway in the 2019 All-Ireland minor final. He ended the season by being named on the Minor Team of the Year. Cashman subsequently progressed to the under-20 team and won a Munster U20FC medal in 2021. He made his senior team debut in the pre-season McGrath Cup competition in 2024.

== Career statistics ==
As of 1 June 2024

| Team | Year | National League | | | Munster | | All-Ireland | | Total | |
| Team | Year | Division | Apps | Score | Apps | Score | Apps | Score | Apps | Score |
|---|---|---|---|---|---|---|---|---|---|---|
| Cork | 2024 | Division 2 | 4 | 0-00 | 0 | 0-00 | 0 | 0-00 | 4 | 0-00 |
| Total | | | 4 | 0-00 | 0 | 0-00 | 0 | 0-00 | 4 | 0-00 |

== Honours ==
Cork

- McGrath Cup: 2024
- Munster Under-20 Football Championship: 2021
- All-Ireland Minor Football Championship: 2019
