= 2024 All-Ireland Minor Football Championship Tier 3 =

Annual Gaelic football competition

- Dates: 18 May - June 2024
- Teams: 13
- Sponsor: Electric Ireland
- Champions: Down (1st title); Barra McEvoy (captain)
- Runners-up: Westmeath; Cian Whitney (captain)

Tournament statistics
- Matches played: 12
- Goals scored: 51 (4.25 per match)
- Points scored: 293 (24.42 per match)

The 2024 All-Ireland Minor Football Championship Tier 3 was the inaugural staging of the All-Ireland Minor Football Championship Tier 3 since its establishment by the Gaelic Athletic Association. The championship ran from 18 May to 8 June 2024.

The All-Ireland final was played on 8 June 2024 at Kingspan Breffni in Cavan, between Down and Westmeath, in what was their first ever championship meeting. Down won the match by 4-13 to 2-17 to claim their first ever All-Ireland MFC Tier 3 title.

== Participating teams ==
Province	Championship	Teams progressing
Britain	n/a	London
Connacht	Connacht Minor Football Championship	Leitrim
Leinster	Leinster Minor Football Championship	Carlow, Laois, Meath, Offaly, Westmeath
Munster	Munster Minor Football Championship	Limerick, Tipperary, Waterford
Ulster	Ulster Minor Football Championship	Antrim, Down, Fermanagh

== Results ==
=== All-Ireland preliminary quarter-finals ===
18 May 2024 Preliminary quarter-final	Westmeath	5-18 - 0-04	Carlow	Fr Eamon O'Brien Park

18 May 2024 Preliminary quarter-final	Offaly	0-13 - 4-11	Waterford	Faithful Fields

18 May 2024 Preliminary quarter-final	Limerick	3-11 - 0-08	Fermaangh	Connacht GAA Centre

18 May 2024 Preliminary quarter-final	Laois	4-16 - 1-09	Antrim	Páirc Baile Fiach

18 May 2024 Preliminary quarter-final	Meath	0-08 - 2-16	Down	Páirc Tailteann

=== All-Ireland quarter-finals ===
25 May 2024 Quarter-final	Limerick	0-07 - 3-13	Down	St Brendan's Park

25 May 2024 Quarter-final	Tipperary	0-10 - 3-19	Westmeath	Templetuohy Grounds

26 May 2024 Quarter-final	Leitrim	3-18 - 1-06	London	Connacht Centre of Excellence

28 May 2024 Quarter-final	Waterford	2-08 - 3-11	Laois	Carlow Centre of Excellence Fenagh

=== All-Ireland semi-finals ===
1 June 2024 Semi-final	Down	5-19 - 1-12	Leitrim	Lavey Grounds

1 June 2024 Semi-final	Westmeath	4-12 - 1-14	Laois	O'Brien Park

=== All-Ireland final ===
8 June 2024 Final	Down	4-13 - 2-17	Westmeath	Kingspan Breffni
		Report
