= 2020 Sigerson Cup =

110th staging of the Gaelic football tournament

Sigerson Cup
Tournament details
- Year: 2020
- Sponsor: Electric Ireland
- Date: 11–29 January
- Teams: 16
- Defending champions: UCC

Winners
- Champions: DCU (5th win)
- Manager: Paddy Christie
- Captain: Brendan McCole

Promotion/Relegation
- Relegated team(s): Athlone Institute of Technology

Other
- Matches played: 16

The 2020 Sigerson Cup was the 110th staging of the Sigerson Cup since its establishment by the Gaelic Athletic Association in 1911. It was sponsored by Electric Ireland, and known as the Electric Ireland HE GAA Sigerson Cup for sponsorship purposes.

The draw for the eight first round fixtures took place on 4 December 2019.

2019 winners UCC met NUI Galway in the tie of the first round, while defeated finalists St Mary's were drawn against Maynooth University. 2018 champions UCD met UUJ. Eventual 2020 champions DCU met Garda College, while the remainder of the ties largely involved an assortment of institutes of technology and polytechnics. Play began on 11 January 2020, with Queen's University Belfast winning their first round tie.

DCU won the final, played on 29 January in Dublin.

== Awards ==
2020 Higher Education GAA Rising Stars Football Team

1. Evan Comerford
2. Brendan McCole
3. Mike Breen
4. Niall Hughes
5. Ray Connellan
6. Jordan Morrissey
7. Trevor Collins
8. Shane Carthy
9. Michael Langan
10. Pádraig O'Toole
11. Mícheál Bannigan
12. Peadar Mogan
13. David Garland^{FOTY}
14. Gavin O'Brien
15. Cian Farrell

== See also ==
- Sigerson Cup (2007, 2023)
