= Sigerson Cup =

Gaelic football trophy in Ireland

- Current season or competition: 2026 Sigerson Cup
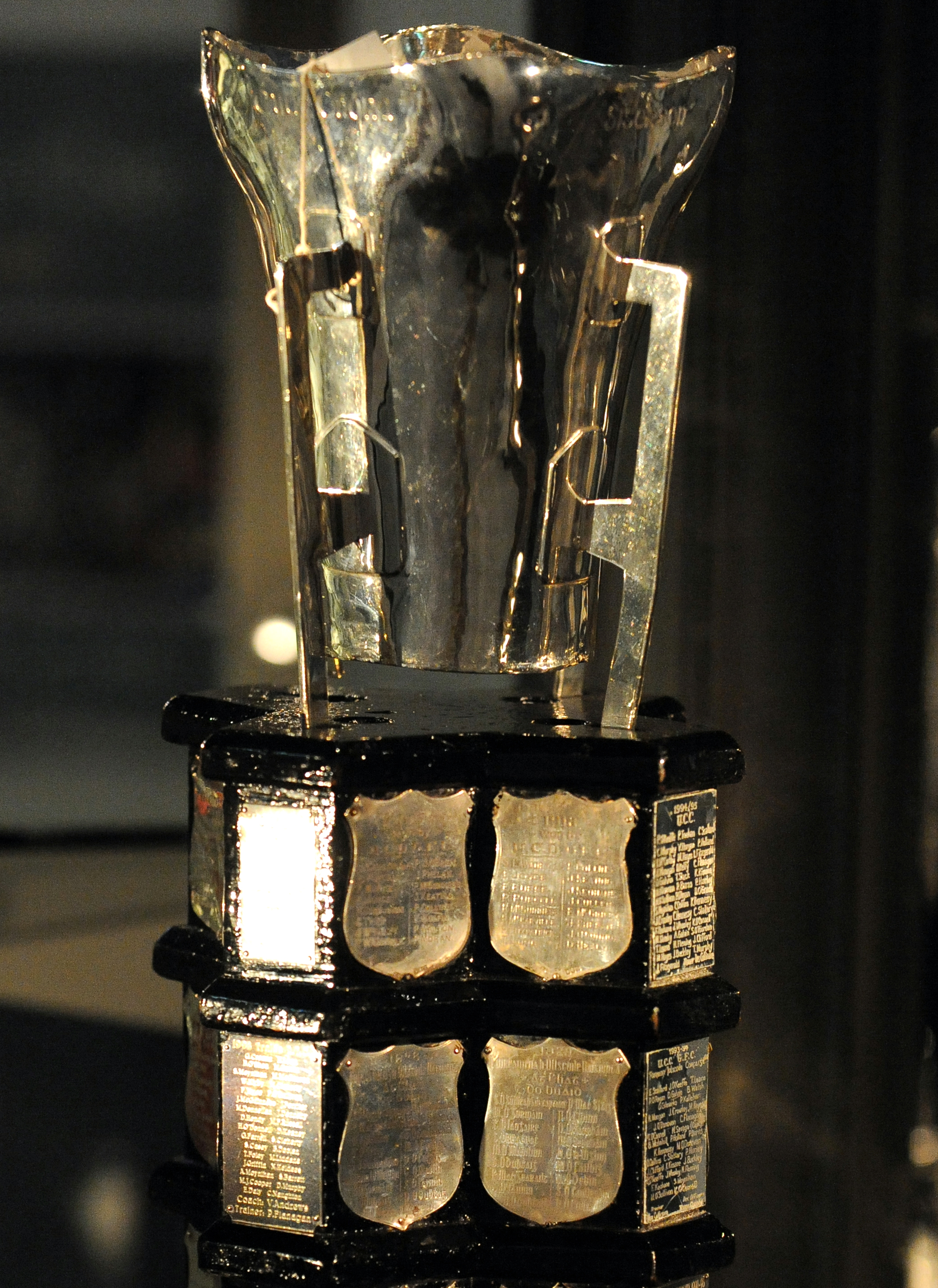
- Trophy donated by Dr George Sigerson for an Inter-collegiate Gaelic Football competition in 1911. The cup is in the shape of a mether, an ancient Irish mead-drinking vessel. It has four handles representing the four provinces of Ireland. The Cup was first presented at a dinner in the Gresham Hotel, Dublin on Thursday 12 May 1911 to University College Cork, the inaugural tournament winner. The original cup is now in the GAA Museum Croke Park. A replica cup is now presented to the winning team.
- Irish: Corn Mhic Shíoghair
- Code: Gaelic football
- Founded: 1911
- Region: Ireland (GAA)
- Trophy: Sigerson Cup
- Title holders: UL (1st title)
- Most titles: University College Dublin (34 titles)
- Sponsors: Electric Ireland
- Official website: Official Website

The Sigerson Cup /ˈsɪɡərsən/ is the trophy for the premier Gaelic football championship among Higher Education institutions (Universities, Colleges and Institutes of Technology) in Ireland. It traditionally begins in mid January and ends in late February. The Sigerson Cup competition is administered by Comhairle Ard Oideachais Cumann Lúthchleas Gael (CLG), the GAA's Higher Education Council.

The Trench Cup is the second tier football competition, Corn na Mac Léinn the third tier and Corn Comhairle Ardoideachais the fourth tier. The Fitzgibbon Cup is the hurling equivalent of the Sigerson Cup.

== History ==
There was no intervarsity Gaelic sports competition until George Sigerson, Professor of Zoology at University College Dublin, physician, and literary figure offered up a trophy in 1911. The cup was in the shape of a mether, an ancient Irish drinking vessel, and had four handles representing each of the four Irish provinces. Sigerson presented the trophy at the first tournament dinner, at the old Gresham Hotel, Dublin, in May 1911. W. J. O'Riordan received the cup on behalf of UCC, the first winning team. In 2009 Sigerson was named in the Sunday Tribune's list of the 125 Most Influential People In GAA History. The trophy itself was the longest-serving trophy in national circulation in Gaelic games, until it was replaced by an identical model in 2001.

From its inception Sigerson's alma mater, UCD have dominated the competition winning 33 titles, their greatest era being in the 1970s when they won the title six times in seven years. These Sigerson Cup wins proved to be the launch pad for success further afield, as UCD went on to add two All-Ireland Club Championship wins to their haul.

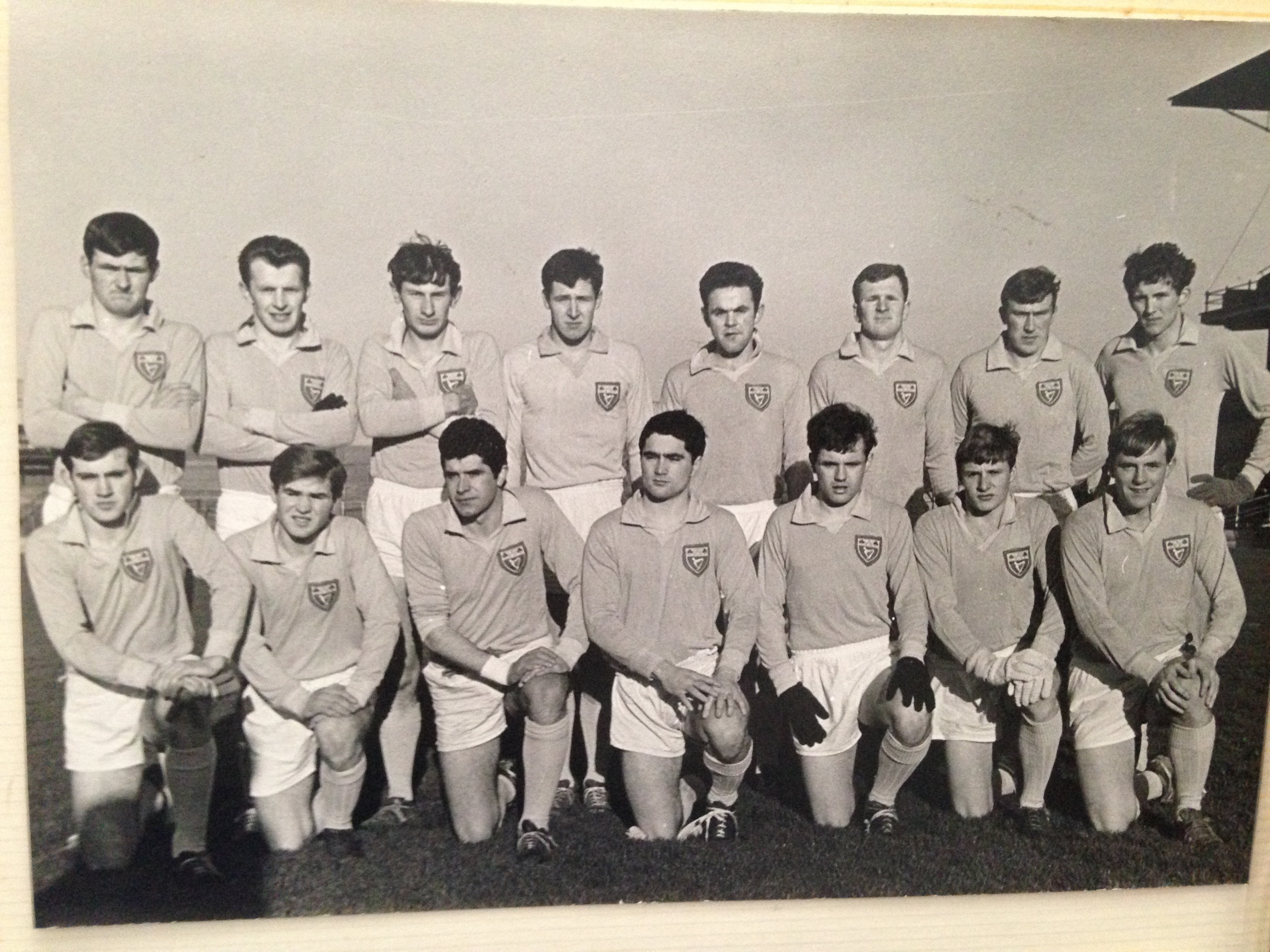
UCD Sigerson champions, 1968

In the early days of the tournament, only UCD, UCC and UCG took part. The competition has been run off every year since, with the exceptions of 1920, 1942 and 1967. UCC are second in the pecking order in terms of championships won, currently having 24 victories to their credit. UCG (now NUI Galway) holds the record for the longest winning sequence. After their victory in 1936, the Galway University club went on to claim the next five titles and their six in a row is still an unequalled record.

As the years passed, the domination of the original big three was challenged by a number of new participants. Queen's University Belfast entered the competition for the first time in 1923, but did not enter thereafter until 1933. They have participated in the competition every year since and won their first title in 1958. Queen's have eight titles to their name, winning their eighth in 2007 by defeating UUJ 0-15 to 0-14 in the final.

As society in general changed with time, and more and more people began to enter third-level education, the number of colleges and universities grew rapidly. The impact of these changes on the Sigerson Cup has been immeasurable. Trinity College Dublin first entered in 1963, followed by NUIM in 1972, the New University of Ulster (later University of Ulster, Coleraine) in 1976, and University of Ulster, Jordanstown in 1985. The next colleges to enter were Thomond, NIHE Limerick and St Mary's, Belfast, all in 1988. Further expansion and the admission of Regional Technical Colleges to the competition saw Dublin City University enter in 1990 and the RTCs from Athlone in 1991, Sligo in 1992, Cork in 1995, Tralee in 1996 and Dublin IT in 1998. All of these third-level institutions have claimed Sigerson Cup titles since the mid-nineties, most recently Dublin IT in 2013.

Tralee's entry to the competition proved especially fruitful when they won successive titles in 1997, 1998 and 1999. The stranglehold of the larger Universities, UCD, UCG and UCC, has now been broken. The colleges in the north have gained a new confidence in the competition, and with a whole raft of new participants joining in recent years, the trophy is now harder won than ever. Since the 2000/01 season IT Sligo and DCU have both won the Sigerson Cup three times. The Silver Jubilee Tournament was played in 1935/36, won by University College Dublin; the Golden Jubilee Tournament in 1961/62, won by University College Dublin; the Diamond Jubilee tournament in 1971/72, won by University College Cork; the 75th tournament in 1986/87, won by University of Ulster Jordanstown; and the Centennial tournament in 2011/12, won by Dublin City University.

The GAA Higher Education Cups are currently sponsored by the Electric Ireland who follow on from The Irish Daily Mail, Ulster Bank, Datapac, Bus Éireann and Independent.ie as investors in Ireland's premier Higher Education GAA sports competitions.

Mick Raftery (UCG & Mayo/Galway) holds the record as an eight-time Sigerson Cup winner, 1933–41.

== Current competition format ==
The 2018-19 competition begins with a double-elimination stage where every team is guaranteed at least two games. All matches finish on the day. If the score is level at the end of normal time, two ten minute periods of extra time are played each way. If the score is still level at the end of extra time, the winning team is determined by a free-taking competition.

Double-elimination stage

- In round 1 all sixteen teams compete in eight matches.
- In round 2, the eight beaten teams from round 1 playoff in four matches. The four losing teams in round 2 are eliminated.
- In round 3, four of the eight winning teams from round 1 play the four winning teams from round 2. The other four winning teams from round 1 are given byes to the quarter-finals. The four losing teams in round 3 are eliminated.

Knockout stage

Traditionally the semi-finals and final took place at a single host venue over a weekend known as 'The Sigerson Weekend'. This arrangement was abandoned in 2018-19 with the semi-finals and final being organised as separate events.

- In the quarter-finals, the four remaining winning teams from round 1 who were given a bye in round 3 play the four winning teams from round 3. The four losing teams are eliminated.
- In the semi-finals, the four winning teams from the quarter-finals playoff in two matches. The two losing teams are eliminated.
- In the final, the two winning teams from the semi-finals meet.

== Roll of honour ==
=== Wins listed by College ===
Team	County	Wins	Last win
University College Dublin (UCD)	Dublin	34	2018
University College Cork (UCC)	Cork	24	2023
University of Galway (formerly NUIG & UCG)	Galway	23	2022
Queen's University Belfast (QUB)	Antrim	8	2007
Ulster University (UU)	Antrim	6	2024
Dublin City University	Dublin	6	2025
Munster Technological University Kerry (formally Institute of Technology, Tralee) (ITT)	Kerry	3	1999
Atlantic Technological University Sligo (formerly Institute of Technology, Sligo (ITS)	Sligo	3	2005
St Mary's University College, Belfast	Antrim	2	2017
Maynooth University (NUIM) (as St. Patrick's College, Maynooth)	Kildare	1	1976
Munster Technological University Cork (formerly Cork Institute of Technology) (CIT)	Cork	1	2009
Technological University Dublin (formerly Dublin Institute of Technology) (DIT)	Dublin	1	2013
University of Limerick (UL)	Limerick	1	2026

Finalists who have not won the Sigerson Cup:

- Garda Síochána College
- Trinity College Dublin
- IT Carlow

=== Winners listed by year ===
- 1910/11 UCC
- 1911/12 UCG
- 1912/13 UCD
- 1913/14 UCC
- 1914/15 UCD
- 1915/16 UCC
- 1916/17 UCD
- 1917/18 UCD
- 1918/19 UCC
- 1919/20 UCD
- 1920/21 Not Played
- 1921/22 UCG
- 1922/23 UCC
- 1923/24 UCD
- 1924/25 UCC
- 1925/26 UCC
- 1926/27 UCD
- 1927/28 UCC
- 1928/29 UCD
- 1929/30 UCD
- 1930/31 UCD
- 1931/32 UCD
- 1932/33 UCD
- 1933/34 UCG
- 1934/35 UCG
- 1935/36 UCD
- 1936/37 UCG
- 1937/38 UCG
- 1938/39 UCG
- 1939/40 UCG
- 1940/41 UCG
- 1941/42 UCG
- 1942/43 Not Played
- 1943/44 UCC
- 1944/45 UCD
- 1945/46 UCD
- 1946/47 UCC
- 1947/48 UCD
- 1948/49 UCG
- 1949/50 UCD
- 1950/51 UCG
- 1951/52 UCC
- 1952/53 UCC
- 1953/54 UCD
- 1954/55 UCG
- 1955/56 UCD
- 1956/57 UCD
- 1957/58 UCD
- 1958/59 QUB
- 1959/60 UCD
- 1960/61 UCG
- 1961/62 UCD
- 1962/63 UCG
- 1963/64 UCG
- 1964/65 QUB
- 1965/66 UCC
- 1966/67 UCC
- 1967/68 UCD
- 1968/69 UCC
- 1969/70 UCC
- 1970/71 QUB
- 1971/72 UCC
- 1972/73 UCD
- 1973/74 UCD
- 1974/75 UCD
- 1975/76 SPC Maynooth
- 1976/77 UCD
- 1977/78 UCD
- 1978/79 UCD
- 1979/80 UCG
- 1980/81 UCG
- 1981/82 QUB
- 1982/83 UCG
- 1983/84 UCG
- 1984/85 UCD
- 1985/86 UUJ
- 1986/87 UUJ
- 1987/88 UCC
- 1988/89 St Mary's, Belfast
- 1989/90 QUB
- 1990/91 UUJ
- 1991/92 UCG
- 1992/93 QUB
- 1993/94 UCC
- 1994/95 UCC
- 1995/96 UCD
- 1996/97 Tralee RTC
- 1997/98 IT Tralee
- 1998/99 IT Tralee
- 1999/00 QUB
- 2000/01 UUJ
- 2001/02 IT Sligo
- 2002/03 NUI Galway
- 2003/04 IT Sligo
- 2004/05 IT Sligo
- 2005/06 DCU
- 2006/07 QUB
- 2007/08 UUJ
- 2008/09 Cork IT
- 2009/10 DCU
- 2010/11 UCC
- 2011/12 DCU
- 2012/13 Dublin IT
- 2013/14 UCC
- 2014/15 DCU
- 2015/16 UCD
- 2016/17 St Mary's, Belfast
- 2017/18 UCD
- 2018/19 UCC
- 2019/20 DCU
- 2020/21 No competition
- 2021/22 NUI Galway
- 2022/23 UCC
- 2023/24 UU
- 2024/25 DCU
- 2025/26 UL

=== Sigerson Shield [Plate] winners ===
The Sigerson Shield [Plate] competition was introduced in 1976/77 for the teams beaten in the quarter-finals of the Sigerson Cup, in essence to provide competition for the losing teams over the three-day Sigerson weekend. Trinity College Dublin (Dublin University) were the inaugural winners at Fahy Field, Galway. As a consequence of the Sigerson Cup function at the Dublin University Boat Club, Islandbridge, in February 1990 which descended into an 'orgy of destruction', the CAO decided to scrap the three-day finals weekend format to avoid any recurrence of such chaotic behaviour. In 1990/91 the multi-game weekend format was replaced with all the games being played at separate venues. In 1991/92, the quarter-finals were run off separately from the semi-finals and final, the latter being played over a two-day Sigerson weekend; the same format was used in 1992/93. From 1993/94 the final stages of both the Sigerson and Trench Cups were staged over the same weekend. In 1992/93 the Sigerson Shield was contested between the losing semi-finalists, University College Galway and the University of Ulster at Jordanstown.

- 1976/77 TCD 1-8 NUU† 0-3
- 1977/78 TCD 3-9 QUB 1-9
- 1978/79 TCD 1-10 QUB 1-6
- 1979/80 UCC 3-16 QUB 1-9
- 1980/81 QUB 0-7 NUU 0-6
- 1981/82 UCC 4-6 NUU 0-12
- 1982/83 UCD 0-9 SPC Maynooth 0-7
- 1983/84 SPC Maynooth 0-13 TCD 0-7
- 1984/85 TCD 1-10 UU Jordanstown 2-6
- 1985/86 QUB 2-6 TCD 1-8
- 1986/87 QUB 1-11 UCG 0-4
- 1987/88 TCD 2-6 NIHE Limerick 1-5
- 1988/89 UCG 1-8 UU Jordanstown 1-6
- 1989/90 DCU 1-15 UCG 0-15
- 1990/91 Not played?
- 1991/92 Not Played?
- 1992/93 UCG 7-13 UU Jordanstown 3-11

† New University of Ulster

=== Captains of Sigerson Cup winning teams ===
Unpublished list of playing captains kindly provided by Dónal McAnallen. NB: Some differences exist between this list of playing team captains and publicly visible, wall-mounted lists of college club captains (often non-playing)

Academic Year	Player	College	County
1910/11	William John O'Riordan	University College Cork (UCC)	Cork
1911/12	Joseph F. Donegan	University College, Galway (UCG)	Sligo
1912/13	Francis J. Cronin	University College Dublin (UCD)	Kerry
1913/14	Tom Nunan	University College Cork (UCC)	Cork
1914/15	Patrick Fitzpatrick	University College Dublin (UCD)	Clare
1915/16	Michael Charles Troy	University College Cork (UCC)	Kerry
1916/17	Solomon Lawlor	University College Dublin (UCD)	Kerry
1917/18	Solomon Lawlor	University College Dublin (UCD)	Kerry
1918/19	Con Lucey	University College Cork (UCC)	Cork
1919/20	Tom "Toddy" Pierse	University College Dublin (UCD)	Wexford
1920/21	Not played		
1921/22	W. McDonald	University College Galway (UCG)	Galway (?)
1922/23	Tom Nunan	University College Cork (UCC)	Cork
1923/24	Séamus Gardiner	University College Dublin (UCD)	Clare
1924/25	Michael Murphy	University College Cork (UCC)	Kerry
1925/26	Pádraig Ó Súilleabháin	University College Cork (UCC)	Cork
1926/27	Éamonn O'Doherty	University College Dublin (UCD)	Clare
1927/28	Peter Coughlan	University College Cork (UCC)	Kerry & Cork
1928/29	Éamonn O'Doherty	University College Dublin (UCD)	Clare
1929/30	Joe O'Sullivan	University College Dublin (UCD)	Kerry
1930/31	Mick O'Gorman	University College Dublin (UCD)	Monaghan
1931/32	George Powell	University College Dublin (UCD)	Kerry
1932/33	Seán Flood	University College Dublin (UCD)	Meath
1933/34	Michael Higgins	University College Galway (UCG)	Galway
1934/35	Antóin Ó Riagáin	University College Galway (UCG)	Galway
1935/36	Paddy McMahon	University College Dublin (UCD)	Kerry
1936/37	Hugh Gibbons	University College Galway (UCG)	Roscommon
1937/38	James Laffey	University College Galway (UCG)	Mayo
1938/39	Gerry O'Beirne	University College Galway (UCG)	Roscommon
1939/40	Joe Salmon	University College Galway (UCG)	Mayo & Galway
1940/41	Joe Salmon	University College Galway (UCG)	Mayo & Galway
1941/42	Dan Kavanagh	University College Galway (UCG)	Kerry & Galway
1942/43	Not played		
1943/44	William Gavin	University College Cork (UCC)	Tipperary
1944/45	Jack Culleton	University College Dublin (UCD)	Wexford
1945/46	Seán Flanagan	University College Dublin (UCD)	Mayo
1946/47	Nioclás Mac Craith	University College Cork (UCC)	Waterford
1947/48	P. J. Duke	University College Dublin (UCD)	Cavan
1948/49	Billy Kenny	University College Galway (UCG)	Mayo
1949/50	John O'Brien	University College Dublin (UCD)	Meath
1950/51	Bill McQuillan	University College Galway (UCG)	Roscommon
1951/52	Fr Jim White	University College Cork (UCC)	Cork
1952/53	Paudie Sheehy	University College Cork (UCC)	Kerry
1953/54	Pat Fenelon	University College Dublin (UCD)	Offaly
1954/55	Eamon Mac Tigue	University College Galway (UCG)	Mayo
1955/56	Kieran Denvir	University College Dublin (UCD)	Down
1956/57	Jim McDonnell	University College Dublin (UCD)	Cavan
1957/58	Felix McNight	University College Dublin (UCD)	Armagh
1958/59	Hugh O'Kane	Queen's University Belfast (QUB)	Antrim
1959/60	James Brady	University College Dublin (UCD)	Cavan
1960/61	George Glynn	University College Galway (UCG)	Galway & Down
1961/62	Sean Murray	University College Dublin (UCD)	Longford
1962/63	Hugh McGonigle	University College Galway (UCG)	Sligo
1963/64	Enda Colleran	University College Galway (UCG)	Galway
1964/65	Des Sharkey	Queen's University Belfast (QUB)	Antrim
1965/66	Pat Moynihan	University College Cork (UCC)	Kerry
1966/67	Denis Philpott	University College Cork (UCC)	Cork
1967/68	Benny Gaughran	University College Dublin (UCD)	Louth
1968/69	Christy O'Sullivan	University College Cork (UCC)	Kerry
1969/70	Moss Keane	University College Cork (UCC)	Kerry
1970/71	Patrick Park	Queen's University Belfast (QUB)	Tyrone
1971/72	Jim Gleeson	University College Cork (UCC)	Cork
1972/73	Éamonn O'Donoghue	University College Dublin (UCD)	Kildare
1973/74	Paddy Kerr	University College Dublin (UCD)	Monaghan
1974/75	Mick Carty	University College Dublin (UCD)	Wexford
1975/76	Dan O'Mahony	St Patrick's College, Maynooth (now Maynooth University, MU)	Mayo
1976/77	Ivan Heffernan	University College Dublin (UCD)	Mayo
1977/78	Gerry McEntee	University College Dublin (UCD)	Meath
1978/79	Tony McManus	University College Dublin (UCD)	Roscommon
1979/80	Pádraig Monaghan	University College Galway (UCG)	Mayo
1980/81	Gay McManus	University College Galway (UCG)	Galway
1981/82	Séamus Boyd	Queen's University Belfast (QUB)	Antrim
1982/83	Richie Lee	University College Galway (UCG)	Galway
1983/84	Tomás Tierney	University College Galway (UCG)	Galway
1984/85	Bill Sex	University College Dublin (UCD)	Kildare
1985/86	Colin Harney	University of Ulster (UU)	Armagh
1986/87	D. J. Kane	University of Ulster (UU)	Down
1987/88	John Keane	University College Cork (UCC)	Kerry
1988/89	John Reihill	St Mary's University College	Fermanagh
1989/90	Feargal Logan	Queen's University Belfast (QUB)	Tyrone
1990/91	Noel Donnelly	University of Ulster (UUJ)	Tyrone
1991/92	Seán Óg De Paor	University College Galway (UCG)	Galway
1992/93	Paul Brewster	Queen's University Belfast (QUB)	Fermanagh
1993/94	Niall Savage	University College Cork (UCC)	Kerry
1994/95	Paul O'Keeffe	University College Cork (UCC)	Cork
1995/96	Fachtna Collins	University College Dublin (UCD)	Cork
1996/97	Éamon Ferris	Tralee Regional Technical College (now ITT)	Kerry
1997/98	Michael Cloherty	Institute of Technology, Tralee	Galway
1998/99	Jim McGuinness	Institute of Technology, Tralee	Donegal
1999/00	Diarmaid Marsden	Queen's University Belfast (QUB)	Armagh
2000/01	Jim McGuinness	University of Ulster (UU)	Donegal
2001/02	Aidan Higgins	Institute of Technology, Sligo	Mayo
2002/03	Lorcán Ó Callaráin	National University of Ireland Galway	Galway
2003/04	Michael Moyles	Institute of Technology, Sligo	Mayo
2004/05	Christy Toye	Institute of Technology, Sligo	Donegal
2005/06	Bryan Cullen	Dublin City University (DCU)	Dublin
2006/07	Daniel McCartan	Queen's University Belfast (QUB)	Down
2007/08	Peter Donnelly	University of Ulster (UU)	Tyrone
2008/09	Paul O'Flynn	Cork Institute of Technology (CIT)	Cork
2009/10	Paddy Andrews	Dublin City University (DCU)	Dublin
2010/11	Adrian Greaney	University College Cork (UCC)	Kerry
2011/12	Kieran Gavin	Dublin City University (DCU)	Westmeath
2012/13	Colin Walshe	Dublin Institute of Technology (DIT)	Monaghan
2013/14	Paul Geaney	University College Cork (UCC)	Kerry
2014/15	Tom Flynn	Dublin City University (DCU)	Galway
2015/16	Jack McCaffrey	University College Dublin (UCD)	Dublin
2016/17	Conor Meyler	St Mary's University College	Tyrone
2017/18	Stephen Coen	University College Dublin	Mayo
2018/19	Cian Kiely	University College Cork	Cork
2019/20	Brendan McCole	Dublin City University (DCU)	Donegal
2020/21	Not held due to the impact of the COVID-19 pandemic on Gaelic games		
2021/22	Matthew Tierney	National University of Ireland Galway	Galway
2022/23	Jack Murphy	University College Cork	Cork
2023/24	Ryan Magill	University of Ulster (UU)	Down
2024/25	Adam Fearon	Dublin City University (DCU)	Meath
2025/26	Brian McNamara	University of Limerick	Clare

=== Man of the Match/Player of the Tournament and winning top scorers ===
The accolade of Man of the Match or Player of the Tournament dates at least from the 1980s. The "Player of the Tournament" was not always from the winning team, e.g., 1983/84. Top scorer refers to the player with the highest points tally on the winning side.

Year	MOTM/POTT	Top Scorer	College	County	Points scored
1979/80	Colm O'Rourke		University College Dublin	Meath	0-2
		Michael "Micksey" Clarke	University College Galway	Westmeath	1-2
1980/81	Gay McManus	Gay McManus	University College Galway	Galway	0-6
1981/82			Queen's University Belfast		
		Greg Blaney	Queen's University Belfast	Down	0-5
1982/83	Páraic Duffy	Páraic Duffy	University College Galway	Mayo	1-2
1983/84	Barry Coffey		University College Cork	Cork	0-1
		Pádraig "Dandy" Kelly	University College Galway	Galway	1-3
1984/85	Dermot Flanagan		University College Dublin	Mayo	0-1
		Micheál O'Donoghue	University College Dublin	Kerry	0-3
		Niall Clancy	University College Dublin	Dublin	0-3 (1f)
1985/86	Ger Houlahan	Ger Houlahan	University of Ulster, Jordanstown	Armagh	1-2 (1f)
		Enda Gormley	University of Ulster, Jordanstown	Derry	0-5 (2fs)
1986/87	Barry Young		University of Ulster, Jordanstown	Derry	—
		Enda Gormley	University of Ulster, Jordanstown	Derry	0-3
1987/88	Maurice Fitzgerald	Maurice Fitzgerald	University College Cork	Kerry	0-3
1988/89	John Rafferty		St Mary's University College, Belfast	Armagh	—
		Fergal McCann	St Mary's University College (Belfast)	Fermanagh	2-1
1989/90			Queen's University Belfast		
		James McCartan	Queen's University Belfast	Down	1-3
1990/91			University of Ulster, Jordanstown		
			University of Ulster, Jordanstown		
1991/92	Sylvester Maguire		University College Galway	Donegal	0-3
		Lorcan Dowd	University College Galway	Roscommon	1-2
1992/93			Queen's University Belfast		
		Anthony Tohill	Queen's University Belfast	Derry	0-6
1993/94	Mark O'Sullivan	Mark O'Sullivan	University College Cork	Cork	1-2
1994/95	Séamus Moynihan		University College Cork	Kerry	0-1
		John Clifford	University College Cork	Cork	0-4
		John Crowley	University College Cork	Cork	0-4
1995/96	Ciarán McManus		University College Dublin	Offaly	0-3 (1f, 1 '45)
		David Nestor	University College Dublin	Limerick	0-4
1996/97	William Kirby		Tralee RTC	Kerry	—
		Gene Farrell	Tralee RTC	Kerry	0-4 (2fs)
1997/98	Jack Ferriter	Jack Ferriter	Institute of Technology Tralee	Kerry	0-3 (1f)
1998/99	Noel Garvan		Institute of Technology Tralee	Laois	—
		Jack Ferriter	Institute of Technology Tralee	Kerry	0-3 (3fs)
		Noel Kennelly	Institute of Technology Tralee	Kerry	1-0
1999/00	Tom Brewster		Queen's University of Belfast	Fermanagh	0-3 (3fs)
		Liam McBarron	Queen's University of Belfast	Fermanagh	1-1
2000/01	Liam Doyle		University of Ulster, Jordanstown	Leitrim & Down	0-1
		Paddy Bradley	University of Ulster, Jordansown	Derry	0-5
2001/02	Aidan Higgins		Institute of Technology Sligo	Mayo	—
		Paul Finlay	Institute of Technology Sligo	Monaghan	0-5 (2fs, 1 '45)
2002/03	Michael Meehan	Michael Meehan	NUI Galway	Galway	1-4 (1-2fs, 2sl)
2003/04	Kevin Cassidy		Institute of Technology Sligo	Donegal	0-1
		Paul Finlay	Institute of Technology Sligo	Monaghan	0-5 (2fs, 1 '45)
2004/05	Keith Higgins		Institute of Technology Sligo	Mayo	—
		Michael Doherty	Institute of Technology Sligo	Sligo	0-3 (2fs)
2005/06	Declan Lally		Dublin City University	Dublin	—
		Conor Mortimer	Dublin City University	Mayo	0-4 (2fs)
		Seánie Johnston	Dublin City University	Cavan	0-4 (1f)
2006/07	Kevin McGourty		Queen's University of Belfast	Antrim	0-1
		Ciarán O'Reilly	Queen's University of Belfast	Fermanagh	0-5 (4fs)
2007/08	Karl Lacey		University of Ulster Jordanstown	Donegal	—
		Paddy Cunningham	University of Ulster Jordanstown	Antrim	1-9 (4fs)
2008/09	Aidan O'Sullivan		Cork Institute of Technology	Cork	—
		Daniel Goulding	Cork Institute of Technology	Cork	0-9 (8fs, 1 '45)
2009/10	Brian Sheridan	Brian Sheridan	Dublin City University	Meath	1-5 (4fs, 1pen)
2010/11	Kevin O'Driscoll		University College Cork	Cork	0-2
		Barry O'Driscoll	University College Cork	Cork	0-3 (2fs)
2011/12	Paul Flynn	Paul Flynn	Dublin City University	Dublin	1-3
2012/13	Bryan Menton		Dublin Institute of Technology	Meath	—
		Jason Doherty	Dublin Institute of Technology	Mayo	1-2 (2fs)
		David Givney	Dublin Institute of Technology	Cavan	1-2
2013/14	Conor Dorman		University College Cork	Cork	0-1
		Conor Cox	University College Cork	Kerry	0-6 (4fs, 1 '45)
2014/15	Tadhg Lowe		Dublin City University	Roscommon	0-2 (1 '45, 1f)
		Donal Wrynn	Dublin City University	Leitrim	1-1
2015/16	John Heslin	John Heslin	University College Dublin	Westmeath	0-6 (4f)
2016/17	Conor Meyler		St Mary's University College, Belfast	Tyrone	0-1
		Oisin O'Neill	St Mary's University College, Belfast	Armagh	0-4 (3f)
2017/18	Conor McCarthy	Conor McCarthy	University College Dublin	Monaghan	1-6 (0-3f)
2018/19	Seán O'Shea	Seán O'Shea	University College Cork	Kerry	0-7 (0-5f)
2019/20	David Garland	David Garland	Dublin City University	Monaghan	0-04 (0-1f)
2020/21	Not held due to the impact of the COVID-19 pandemic on Gaelic games				
2021/22		Tomo Culhane; Cathal Heneghan	NUI Galway	Offaly; Roscommon	03, 02f 0-3
2022/23	Mark Cronin	Dylan Geaney	University College Cork	Cork, Kerry	1-04 (03f)
2023/24	Eoin McEvoy	Darragh Canavan	University of Ulster	Derry, Tyrone	1-03
2024/25	Senan Baker	Senan Baker	Dublin City University	Westmeath	0-07 (0-4f)
2025/26	Tristan O'Callaghan	Cian McHale	University of Limerick	Clare, Mayo	0-05 (0-2f)

== Finals listed by year ==
Bold text indicates first win.

Academic Year	Winners	Score	Finalists	Score	Venue	Date
1910/11	**University College Cork** (UCC)	1-04	University College Dublin (UCD)	0-03	Jones's Road, Dublin	9 May 1911
	**University College Cork** (UCC)	4-06	University College Galway (UCG)	1-02	Jones's Road, Dublin	10 May 1911
	University College Galway (UCG)		University College Dublin (UCD)		Jones's Road, Dublin	11 May 1911
1911/12	**University College Galway** (UCG)	2-01	University College Dublin (UCD)	2-01	Renmore Grnds, Galway	18 February 1912
	University College Dublin (UCD)	1-00	University College Cork (UCC)	1-00	Renmore Grnds, Galway	19 February 1912
	**University College Galway** (UCG)	1-04	University College Cork (UCC)	0-01	Renmore Grnds, Galway	20 February 1912
1912/13	**University College Dublin** (UCD)	1-04	University College Galway (UCG)	2-01	The Mardyke, Cork	25 February 1913
	University College Galway (UCG)	2-02	University College Cork (UCC)	0-05	The Mardyke, Cork	26 February 1913
	**University College Dublin** (UCD)	3-03	University College Cork (UCC)	0-02	The Mardyke, Cork	27 February 1913
1913/14	University College Cork (UCC)	1-01	University College Galway (UCG)	0-00	Terenure, Dublin	5 May 1914
	University College Dublin (UCD)	2-06	University College Galway (UCG)	0-00	Terenure, Dublin	6 May 1914
	University College Cork (UCC)	1-00	University College Dublin (UCD)	0-02	Terenure, Dublin	7 May 1914
1914/15	University College Galway (UCG)	1-01	University College Dublin (UCD)	0-00	Renmore Grnds, Galway	15 January 1915
	University College Dublin (UCD)	1-05	University College Cork (UCC)	0-01	Renmore Grnds, Galway	16 January 1915
	University College Cork (UCC)	1-02	University College Galway (UCG)	0-02	Renmore Grnds, Galway	17 January 1915
1915/16	University College Cork (UCC)	0-05	University College Galway (UCG)	1-00	Cork Athletic Grounds, Cork	25 February 1916
	University College Dublin (UCD)	3-08	University College Galway (UCG)	0-01	Cork Athletic Grounds, Cork	26 February 1916
	University College Cork (UCC)	2-02	University College Dublin (UCD)	0-00	Cork Athletic Grounds, Cork	27 February 1916
1916/17	University College Dublin (UCD)	1-03	University College Cork (UCC)	0-04	Terenure, Dublin	15 February 1917
	University College Cork (UCC)	4-02	University College Galway (UCG)	1-01	Terenure, Dublin	16 February 1917
	University College Dublin (UCD)	5-02	University College Galway (UCG)	1-03	Terenure, Dublin	17 February 1917
1917/18	University College Dublin (UCD)	1-03	University College Galway (UCG)	0-00	Renmore Grnds, Galway	19 December 1917
	University College Galway (UCG)	0-03	University College Cork (UCC)	0-02	Renmore Grnds, Galway	20 December 1917
	University College Dublin (UCD)	1-02	University College Cork (UCC)	0-01	Renmore Grnds, Galway	21 December 1917
1918/19	University College Cork (UCC)	0-07	University College Galway (UCG)	0-01	The Mardyke, Cork	28 February 1919
	University College Dublin (UCD)	2-04	University College Galway (UCG)	0-01	The Mardyke, Cork	1 March 1919
	University College Cork (UCC)	0-05	University College Dublin (UCD)	1-00	The Mardyke, Cork	2 March 1919
1919/20	University College Dublin (UCD)	1-07	University College Cork (UCC)	1-04	Terenure, Dublin	22 February 1920
1920/21	Not Played	—	—	—	Galway	—
1921/22	University College Galway (UCG)	0-01	University College Cork (UCC)	0-00	South Park, Galway	19 December 1921
1922/23	University College Cork (UCC)	3-01	University College Dublin (UCD)	0-08	The Mardyke, Cork	4 February 1923
1923/24	University College Dublin (UCD)	2-04	University College Cork (UCC)	0-02	Terenure, Dublin	16 December 1923
1924/25	University College Cork (UCC)	1-02	University College Galway (UCG)	0-02	Galway	21 December 1924
1925/26	University College Cork (UCC)	4-03	University College Dublin (UCD)	0-02	The Mardyke, Cork	13 December 1925
1926/27	University College Dublin (UCD)	3-04	University College Cork (UCC)	1-02	Terenure, Dublin	10 December 1926
	University College Galway (UCG)	2-02	University College Cork (UCC)	0-01	Terenure, Dublin	11 December 1926
	University College Dublin (UCD)	0-04	University College Galway (UCG)	0-01	Terenure, Dublin	12 December 1926
1927/28	University College Cork (UCC)	2-05	University College Galway (UCG)	0-02	Galway Sportsgrounds, Galway	9 December 1927
	University College Dublin (UCD)	2-08	University College Galway (UCG)	0-02	Galway Sportsgrounds, Galway	10 December 1927
	University College Cork (UCC)	3-03	University College Dublin (UCD)	1-05	Galway Sportsgrounds, Galway	11 December 1927
1928/29	University College Dublin (UCD)	5-06	University College Cork (UCC)	0-00	The Mardyke, Cork	27 January 1929
1929/30	University College Dublin (UCD)	0-05	University College Cork (UCC)	1-02	Terenure, Dublin	6 December 1929
	University College Cork (UCC)	1-04	University College Galway (UCG)	0-01	Terenure, Dublin	7 December 1929
	University College Dublin (UCD)	5-03	University College Galway (UCG)	0-00	Terenure, Dublin	8 December 1929
1930/31	University College, Galway (UCG)	2-03	University College Cork (UCC)	2-00	Galway Sportsgrounds, Galway	7 December 1930
	University College Dublin (UCD)	1-02	University College Cork (UCC)	0-01	Galway Sportsgrounds, Galway	8 December 1930
	University College Dublin (UCD)	2-01	University College Galway (UCG)	0-06	Galway Sportsgrounds, Galway	9 December 1930
1931/32	University College Dublin (UCD)	2-05	University College Cork (UCC)	2-05 (AET)	The Mardyke, Cork	4 December 1931
	University College Dublin (UCD)	2-04	University College Galway (UCG)	0-05	The Mardyke, Cork	5 December 1931
	University College Galway (UCG)	0-08	University College Cork (UCC)	1-00	The Mardyke, Cork	6 December 1931
1932/33	University College Dublin (UCD)	5-07	University College Cork (UCC)	0-01	Terenure, Dublin	9 December 1932
	University College Cork (UCC)	4-02	University College Galway (UCG)	0-08	Terenure, Dublin	10 December 1932
	University College Dublin (UCD)	5-06	University College Galway (UCG)	1-02	Terenure, Dublin	11 December 1932
1933/34	University College Galway (UCG)	5-06	University College Dublin (UCD)	2-03	Sports Ground, Galway	10 December 1933
1934/35	University College Galway (UCG)	1-05	University College Cork (UCC)	0-01	The Mardyke, Cork	9 December 1934
1935/36	University College Dublin (UCD)	2-03	Queen's University Belfast (QUB)	0-01	Corrigan Park, Belfast	8 December 1935
1936/37	University College Galway (UCG)	4-06	University College Dublin (UCD)	1-03	Croke Park, Dublin	6 December 1936
1937/38	University College Galway (UCG)	0-07	University College Dublin (UCD)	1-02	Galway	5 December 1937
1938/39	University College Galway (UCG)	2-03	University College Cork (UCC)	0-00	The Mardyke, Cork	4 December 1938
1939/40	University College Galway (UCG)	1-05	Queen's University Belfast (QUB)	1-02 ('final')	Corrigan Park, Belfast	10 December 1939
	University College Galway (UCG)	2-06	University College Dublin (UCD)	1-03 ('Replay')	Galway	18 February 1940
1940/41	University College Galway (UCG)	3-05	University College Dublin (UCD)	1-02	Belfield, UCD, Dublin	15 December 1940
1941/42	University College Galway (UCG)	0-08	University College Dublin (UCD)	2-01	Sports Ground, Galway	14 December 1941
1942/43	Not Played	—	—	—	Cork	—
1943/44	University College Cork (UCC)	2-05	University College Dublin (UCD)	3-01	Cork	28 November 1943
1944/45	University College Dublin (UCD)	3-08	University College Cork (UCC)	0-02	Croke Park, Dublin	10 December 1944
1945/46	University College Dublin (UCD)	4-05	Queen's University Belfast (QUB)	2-06	Belfast	25 November 1945
1946/47	University College Cork (UCC)	2-03	University College Dublin (UCD)	0-04	Galway	10 November 1946
1947/48	University College Dublin (UCD)	0-03	University College Cork (UCC)	0-02	The Mardyke, Cork	23 November 1947
1948/49	University College Galway (UCG)	2-05	University College Dublin (UCD)	2-04	Corrigan Park, Belfast	14 November 1948
1949/50	University College Dublin (UCD)	1-08	University College Cork (UCC)	1-07	Croke Park, Dublin	6 November 1949
1950/51	University College Galway (UCG)	1-12	University College Cork (UCC)	1-02	Sports Ground, Galway	26 November 1950
1951/52	University College Cork (UCC)	0-05	University College Galway (UCG)	0-03	The Mardyke, Cork	11 November 1951
1952/53	University College Cork (UCC)	3-04	University College Dublin (UCD)	0-03	Corrigan Park, Belfast	9 November 1952
1953/54	University College Dublin (UCD)	2-07	University College Galway (UCG)	0-04	Croke Park, Dublin	29 November 1953
1954/55	University College Galway (UCG)	2-06	University College Dublin (UCD)	1-09	Galway	14 November 1954
	University College Galway (UCG)	1-10	University College Dublin (UCD)	2-06 (Replay) AET	Galway	30 January 1955
1955/56	University College Dublin (UCD)	3-05	University College Cork (UCC)	2-04	The Mardyke, Cork	20 November 1955
1956/57	University College Dublin (UCD)	1-08	University College Cork (UCC)	1-04	Casement Park, Belfast	2 December 1956
1957/58	University College Dublin (UCD)	0-09	University College Cork (UCC)	2-02	Croke Park, Dublin	24 November 1957
1958/59	Queen's University Belfast (QUB)	2-07	University College Dublin (UCD)	2-07	Pearse Stadium, Galway	23 November 1958
	**Queen's University Belfast** (QUB)	0-10	University College Dublin (UCD)	0-09 (Replay)	Ballybay, County Monaghan	15 February 1959
1959/60	University College Dublin (UCD)	3-08	University College Cork (UCC)	1-04	The Mardyke, Cork	6 December 1959
1960/61	University College Galway (UCG)	1-09	Queen's University Belfast (QUB)	2-03	Casement Park, Belfast	20 November 1960
1961/62	University College Dublin (UCD)	3-07	University College Galway (UCG)	2-07	Croke Park, Dublin	26 November 1961
1962/63	University College Galway (UCG)	1-09	University College Cork (UCC)	1-03	Salthill, Galway	25 November 1962
1963/64	University College Galway (UCG)	2-10	University College Cork (UCC)	0-05	The Mardyke, Cork	1 December 1963
1964/65	Queen's University Belfast (QUB)	3-05	University College Dublin (UCD)	0-08	Casement Park, Belfast	29 November 1964
1965/66	University College Cork (UCC)	3-09	University College Galway (UCG)	0-02	Croke Park, Dublin	5 December 1965
1966/67	University College Cork (UCC)	0-09	University College Galway (UCG)	1-05	Pearse Stadium, Galway	27 November 1966
1967/68	University College Dublin (UCD)	1-10	University College Galway (UCG)	0-04	Croke Park, Dublin	28 January 1968
1968/69	University College Cork (UCC)	5-12	University College Galway (UCG)	0-03	The Mardyke, Cork	2 March 1969
1969/70	University College Cork (UCC)	1-10	Queen's University Belfast (QUB)	1-05	Newry, County Down	15 March 1970
1970/71	Queen's University Belfast (QUB)	0-07	University College Galway (UCG)	0-06	Pearse Stadium, Galway	7 March 1971
1971/72	University College Cork (UCC)	5-07	University College Galway (UCG)	3-08	O'Toole Park, Dublin	5 March 1972
1972/73	University College Dublin (UCD)	1-09	St. Patrick's College, Maynooth (SPM)	1-05	The Mardyke, Cork	4 March 1973
1973/74	University College Dublin (UCD)	0-14	University College Galway (UCG)	1-05	Newbridge, County Kildare	24 February 1974
1974/75	University College Dublin (UCD)	0-18	Queen's University Belfast (QUB)	0-10	Corrigan Park, Belfast	9 March 1975
1975/76	**St. Patrick's College, Maynooth** (SPM)	2-05	University College Dublin (UCD)	0-09	Croke Park, Dublin	29 February 1976
1976/77	University College Dublin (UCD)	1-08	University College Galway (UCG)	1-08	Pearse Stadium, Galway	27 February 1977
	University College Dublin (UCD)	1-11	University College Galway (UCG)	0-06 (Replay)	Pearse Stadium, Galway	10 April 1977
1977/78	University College Dublin (UCD)	1-13	University College Galway (UCG)	0-07	Belfield, UCD, Dublin	26 February 1978
1978/79	University College Dublin (UCD)	2-15	University College Galway (UCG)	0-02	Páirc Uí Chaoimh, Cork	25 February 1979
1979/80	University College Galway (UCG)	1-08	University College Dublin (UCD)	0-07	Bellaghy, County Londonderry	9 March 1980
1980/81	University College Galway (UCG)	1-12	Trinity College Dublin (TCD)	0-06	St Patrick's College, Maynooth	22 February 1981
1981/82	Queen's University Belfast (QUB)	0-12	University College Galway (UCG)	0-07 (AET)	Malone, QUB, Belfast	28 February 1982
1982/83	University College Galway (UCG)	2-08	Queen's University Belfast (QUB)	2-05	Santry, TCD, Dublin	20 February 1983
1983/84	University College Galway (UCG)	1-11	University College Cork (UCC)	2-06	Galway	4 March 1984
1984/85	University College Dublin (UCD)	0-10	Queen's University Belfast (QUB)	0-05	Croke Park, Dublin	24 February 1985
1985/86	**University of Ulster, Jordanstown** (UUJ)	1-08	University College Cork (UCC)	1-05	The Mardyke, Cork	9 March 1986
1986/87	University of Ulster, Jordanstown (UUJ)	0-06	University College Cork (UCC)	0-04	Bellaghy, County Londonderry	1 March 1987
1987/88	University College Cork (UCC)	0-08	University College Galway (UCG)	0-05	Summerhill, County Meath	6 March 1988
1988/89	**St. Mary's University College (Belfast)**	3-13	University College Cork (UCC)	1-05	Malone, QUB, Belfast	5 March 1989
1989/90	Queen's University Belfast (QUB)	3-08	St. Mary's University College (Belfast)	1-09	Santry, TCD, Dublin	25 February 1990
1990/91	University of Ulster, Jordanstown (UUJ)	0-07	University College Galway (UCG)	0-06	Enniskillen, County Tyrone	24 March 1991
1991/92	University College Galway (UCG)	2-08	Queen's University Belfast (QUB)	0-11	Pearse Stadium, Galway	15 March 1992
1992/93	Queen's University Belfast (QUB)	1-12	St. Mary's University College (Belfast)	0-04	Casement Park, Belfast	21 March 1993
1993/94	University College Cork (UCC)	1-09	Queen's University Belfast (QUB)	2-05	Belfield, UCD, Dublin	27 February 1994
1994/95	University College Cork (UCC)	0-12	University College Galway (UCG)	1-07	Páirc Uí Rinn, Cork	12 March 1995
1995/96	University College Dublin (UCD)	2-11	Garda College	3-05	Plassey, UL, Limerick	3 March 1996
1996/97	**Tralee R.T.C.** (ITT)	1-13	University of Limerick (UL)	1-06	UUC Grnds, Coleraine	9 March 1997
1997/98	**Institute of Technology, Tralee** (ITT)	0-10	University of Ulster, Jordanstown (UUJ)	0-08	Stack Park, Tralee	8 March 1998
1998/99	Institute of Technology, Tralee (ITT)	1-08	Garda College	0-07	Malone, QUB, Belfast	7 March 1999
1999/00	Queen's University Belfast (QUB)	1-08	University College Dublin (UCD)	0-08 (AET)	Moycullen, County Galway	27 February 2000
2000/01	University of Ulster, Jordanstown (UUJ)	1-14	University College Dublin (UCD)	1-09	Scotstown, County Monaghan	11 April 2001
2001/02	**Institute of Technology, Sligo** (ITS)	0-06	University College Cork (UCC)	0-05	Markievicz Park, Sligo	23 February 2002
2002/03	National University of Ireland, Galway (NUIG, formerly referred to as UCG)	1-08	University College Dublin (UCD)	0-09	Páirc Uí Rinn, Cork	8 March 2003
2003/04	Institute of Technology, Sligo (ITS)	1-10	Queen's University Belfast (QUB)	1-07	Corrigan Park, Belfast	28 February 2004
2004/05	Institute of Technology, Sligo (ITS)	0-10	Queen's University Belfast (QUB)	0-07 (AET)	Dundalk IT, Dundalk	26 February 2005
2005/06	**Dublin City University (DCU)**	0-11	Queen's University Belfast (QUB)	1-04	Parnell Park, Dublin	25 February 2006
2006/07	Queen's University Belfast (QUB)	0-15	University of Ulster, Jordanstown (UUJ)	0-14	Malone, QUB, Belfast	3 March 2007
2007/08	University of Ulster, Jordanstown (UUJ)	1-16	Garda College	1-14 (AET)	Carlow IT Grnds, Carlow	22 April 2008
2008/09	**Cork Institute of Technology (CIT)**	1-15	Dublin Institute of Technology (DIT)	1-10	Bishopstown, CIT, Cork	28 February 2009
2009/10	Dublin City University (DCU)	1-11	University College Cork (UCC)	0-10	North Campus, NUIM, Maynooth	27 February 2010
2010/11	University College Cork (UCC)	0-10	University of Ulster, Jordanstown (UUJ)	0-07	Belfield, UCD, Dublin	5 March 2011
2011/12	Dublin City University (DCU)	2-17	National University of Ireland, Maynooth (NUIM)	0-07	Dangan, NUI Galway	25 February 2012
2012/13	Dublin Institute of Technology (DIT)	3-08	University College Cork (UCC)	0-07	AIT, Athlone	23 February 2013
2013/14	University College Cork (UCC)	0-10	University of Ulster, Jordanstown (UUJ)	0-09	The Dub, QUB, Belfast	22 February 2014
2014/15	Dublin City University (DCU)	1-14	University College Cork (UCC)	2-10 (AET)	The Mardyke, Cork	21 February 2015
2015/16	University College Dublin (UCD)	0-10	Dublin City University (DCU)	2-02	Jordanstown	20 February 2016
2016/17	St. Mary's University College (Belfast)	0-13	University College Dublin (UCD)	2-06	Connacht GAA Centre, Bekan, Co Mayo	18 February 2017
2017/18	University College Dublin (UCD)	1-13	NUI Galway (NUIG)	2-09	TCD Grounds, Santry Avenue, Dublin	17 February 2018
2018/19	University College Cork (UCC)	0-16	St. Mary's University College (Belfast)	1-09	O'Moore Park, Portlaoise	20 February 2019
2019/20	Dublin City University (DCU)	0-14	IT Carlow	0-07	DCU Sportsground	29 January 2020
2020/21	No competition due to the impact of the COVID-19 pandemic on Gaelic games					
2021/22	National University of Ireland, Galway (NUIG, formerly referred to as UCG)	0-12	University of Limerick	1-06	Carlow IT Sportsground	16 February 2022
2022/23	University College Cork	1-16	University of Limerick	0-16		
2023/24	Ulster University	3-12	University College Dublin	0-15		
2024/25	Dublin City University	1-16	University College Dublin	3-06		
2025/26	**University of Limerick**	0-17	University College Cork	1-11	Croke Park, Dublin	11 February 2026
