= All-Ireland Minor Football Championship Tier 2 =

Second tier Gaelic football competition for players under the age of 17

GAA Football All-Ireland Minor Championship Tier 2
- Current season or competition: 2024 All-Ireland Minor Football Championship Tier 2
- Irish: Craobh Peile Mionúr na hÉireann Sraith 2
- Code: Gaelic football
- Founded: 2024
- Region: Ireland (GAA)
- Trophy: Paul McGirr Cup
- No. of teams: 11
- Title holders: Kildare (1st title)
- First winner: Kildare
- Sponsors: Electric Ireland
- Official website: http://www.gaa.ie/

The GAA Football All-Ireland Minor Championship Tier 2 is an annual inter-county Gaelic football competition organised by the Gaelic Athletic Association (GAA). It is the second tier inter-county Gaelic football competition for male players under the age of 17 in Ireland.

Teams that are eliminated from the early provincial stages of the GAA Football All-Ireland Minor Championship qualify for this championship. 11 teams currently participate.

The final serves as the culmination of a series of games played during the summer months, and the results determine which team receives the Paul McGirr Cup. The All-Ireland Championship is played on a straight knockout basis whereby once a team loses they are eliminated from the championship.

Kildare are the current champions after beating Cavan by 2–12 to 1–10 in the 2024 final.

== History ==
The All-Ireland Minor Football Championship was created in 1929. Various formats were used in the provincial competitions, however, the All-Ireland series was, for many years, confined to the four provincial champions. A change in format resulted in the four provincial runners-up also being allowed entry to the All-Ireland series. A decision at GAA Congress in 2023 allowed for the creation of additional tiered All-Ireland competitions for counties that do not reach the provincial final stage.

== Format ==
=== Qualification ===
Province	Championship	Teams progressing
Connacht	Connacht Minor Football Championship	2: 3rd and 4th-placed teams
Leinster	Leinster Minor Football Championship	4: Beaten quarter and semi-finalists
Munster	Munster Minor Football Championship	1: 3rd-placed team
Ulster	Ulster Minor Football Championship	4: Beaten quarter and semi-finalists

=== Championship ===
There are 11 teams in the All-Ireland Championship. During the course of a championship season nine games are played comprising three preliminary quarter-finals, four quarter-finals, two semi-finals and a final. The championship is played as a single-elimination tournament. Each game is played as a single leg.

== Trophy ==
The Paul McGirr Cup is the current prize for winning the championship. Paul McGirr of Tyrone suffered a fatal injury in an accidental collision in an Ulster Minor Championship game between Tyrone and Armagh in June 1997. The trophy, donated by the McGirr family in 1998, was previously awarded to the winners of the All-Ireland Vocational Schools Championship before being repurposed as the prize for the winners of the All-Ireland U16.5 Championship. The cup was once again repurposed in 2024.

== List of finals ==
Year	Winners		Runners-up		Venue	Captain(s)
Year	County	Score	County	Score	Venue	Captain(s)
2024	Kildare	2-12	Cavan	1-10	Páirc Tailteann	Evan Boyle; Ruaidhrí Lawlor
