= 2007 Sigerson Cup =

The 2007 Sigerson Cup was the 97th staging of the Sigerson Cup since its establishment by the Gaelic Athletic Association in 1911.

The Sigerson Cup is the top division of university football in Ireland. It is administrated by the Higher Education committee which is part of the Gaelic Athletic Association.

The 2007 Sigerson Cup winners were Queen's University Belfast, who defeated UUJ in the final 0–15 to 0–14.

- Winning caption: Daniel McCartan
- Winning manager: James McCartan Jnr

== Summary ==
In the quarter-finals were UCD, Sligo IT, and Jordanstown beat the 2006 Sigerson Cup champions DCU to gain a place in the last eight. Other teams include NUI Galway, Cork IT, Maynooth, and Queen's.

== Bracket ==
Quarterfinals; February 21
UCD	2-05
Queen's	1-12
Maynooth	0-10
Cork IT	2-15
Garda College/UCC	0-09
Sligo IT	1-10
NUI Galway	0-09
UUJ	2-11

Semifinals; March 2
Queen's	1-11
Cork IT	0-07
Sligo IT	1-11
UUJ	0-18 AET

Final; March 3
Queen's	0-15 (AET)
UUJ	0-14 (AET)

== See also ==
- British University Gaelic football Championship
- British University Hurling Championship
- Sigerson Cup (2020, 2023)
