= David Garland (English footballer) =

English footballer

Personal information
- Full name: David Garland
- Date of birth: 18 June 1948 (age 78)
- Place of birth: Grimsby, England
- Height: 5 ft 2 in (1.57 m)
- Position: Forward

Senior career*
| Years | Team | Apps | (Gls) |
| 1965–1967 | Grimsby Town | 2 | (0) |
| 1967 | England | 0 | (0) |
| 1967–1969 | Boston | | |
| 1969–19?? | Skegness Town | | |
- * Club domestic league appearances and goals

David Garland (born 18 June 1948) is an English former professional footballer who played as a forward.
