= David Siteman Garland =

American Author and Show-host

- Occupation(s): Business Show Host, Author
- Website: therisetothetop.com

David Siteman Garland is an American author and host of the popular online business show "The Rise to the Top."

== Career ==
In 2008, Garland founded The Rise To The Top. Since its inception, the show has featured over 300 business and marketing experts and specialists, including Tim Ferriss, Patti Stanger, Seth Godin, and Robert Greene. Within two years the show attracted over 100,000 viewers and currently broadcasts to over 250,000 people.

He is also the author of the 2010 marketing book Smarter, Faster, Cheaper published by Wiley Publishing. The book emphasizes using online communities and online content to improve marketing efforts. Seth Godin, Brian Solis, and Zappos' founder Tony Hsieh wrote the blurbs for the book.
