= David Garland (Gaelic footballer) =

Monaghan Gaelic footballer

David Garland (born c. 1998/9) is a Gaelic footballer who plays for Donaghmoyne and at senior level for the Monaghan county team.

A forward, he won the 2020 Sigerson Cup with DCU. He is student of teaching (PE and biology).

He is also an umpire. Though umpires are not often also county players, Garland has officiated at the National Football League as well as at the 2016 All-Ireland Minor Football Championship semi-final.
