= Electric Ireland =

Utility company in Ireland

- Native name: Leictreachas Éireann
- Formerly: ESB Customer Supply, ESB Independent Energy
- Industry: Electric power, natural gas
- Headquarters: ESB Head Office, Two Gateway, East Wall Road, Dublin, Ireland
- Parent: ESB Group
- Website: electricireland.ie

Electric Ireland (Irish: Leictreachas Éireann) is an Irish utility company that supplies electricity, gas and related services to business and residential customers in Ireland. It is the supply division of the Electricity Supply Board, the state-owned former monopoly electricity company in Ireland. The company now operates in an open market, competing for the retail supply of gas and electricity to consumers. Electric Ireland also sells a variety of energy-related products and services including smart home technology, electric vehicle home chargers, solar PV panels, battery storage.

The business was known previously as ESB Customer Supply and ESB Independent Energy before 4 April 2011. Those brands were transitional; in January 2012, all references to ESB were dropped and it is simply known as Electric Ireland.

== Regulation and pricing ==
With the introduction of competition in the electricity market, the company as the former monopoly was initially required to sell its electricity at a premium of 10% above market price in order to encourage new entrants to the market place. ESB Customer Supply was to re-brand the entire supply operation and lose 40 per cent of its customers before it would be allowed to decide its own prices.

Since 4 April 2011 the Commission for Energy Regulation no longer sets the company's prices; the trade-off for this was that the division was required to change its name from ESB to Electric Ireland, to "remove confusion" between the ESB's role as operator of the electricity network and a supplier in that market. The previous name, ESB Independent Energy, was dropped in January 2012.

== Sponsorship ==
Electric Ireland has a number of sponsorship programmes including Darkness Into Light, with Pieta House, the GAA Minor Championships and the GAA Higher Education Championships.
