= Oisín Maunsell =

Irish hurler

Personal information
- Native name: Oisín Móinséil (Irish)
- Born: 2003 (age 22–23) Abbeydorney, County Kerry, Ireland
- Occupation: Accountant

Sport
- Sport: Hurling
- Position: Left corner-forward
Clubs
- Years: Club
- Abbeydorney; Na Gaeil
Club titles
- Kerry titles: 3
College
- Years: College
- 2021-2025: University of Limerick
College titles
- Fitzgibbon titles: 0
Inter-county
- Years: County
- 2025-present: Kerry
Inter-county titles
- NHL: 0
- All Stars: 0

Oisín Maunsell (born 2003) is an Irish hurler. At club level he plays with Abbeydorney and Na Gaeil and at inter-county level with the Kerry senior hurling team.

== Career ==
Born and raised in Abbeydorney, County Kerry, Maunsell plays club hurling with Abbeydorney and Gaelic football with the Na Gaeil club. He was part of the Abbeydorney team that won three consecutive Kerry SHC titles between 2024 and 2026.

Maunsell attended Causeway Comprehensive School and lined out in all grades of Gaelic football and hurling during his time there. He won a Munster PPS U16½CHC title in 2018, following a win over Blackwater Community School in the final. Maunsell later attended the University of Limerick.

At inter-county level, Maunsell first appeared on the inter-county scene as captain of the Kerry minor football team in 2020. He won a Munster MFC medal that year, before lining out in the 2–12 to 1–14 defeat by Derry in the 2020 All-Ireland MFC final. He ended the campaign by being named on the Minor Team of the Year.

Maunsell made his Kerry senior hurling team debut during the 2025 National Hurling League. He scored two goals after coming on as a substitute in Kerry's 3–24 to 3–19 defeat by Derry in the 2026 Christy Ring Cup final.

== Career statistics ==
As of match played 2 August 2026

Team	Season	Kerry		Munster		All-Ireland		Total	
Team	Season	Apps	Score	Apps	Score	Apps	Score	Apps	Score
Abbeydorney	2023	3	1-02	—		—		3	1-02
Abbeydorney	2024	5	5-08	2	0-06	—		7	5-14
Abbeydorney	2025	3	0-07	1	0-03	—		4	0-10
Abbeydorney	2026	5	3-12	—		—		5	3-12
Total		16	9-29	3	0-09	—		19	9-38

== Honours ==
Causeway

- Munster PPS U16½ C Hurling Championship (1): 2018

Abbeydorney

- Kerry Senior Hurling Championship (3): 2024, 2025, 2026

Kerry

- Munster Minor Football Championship (1): 2020 (c)

Awards

- Minor Football Team of the Year (1): 2020

Sporting positions
Preceded by Jack O'Connor	Kerry minor football team captain 2020	Succeeded by Dara O'Callaghan
Preceded by Tomás O'Connor	Kerry senior hurling team captain 2025	Succeeded by James O'Connor
