= 2026 Kerry Senior Hurling Championship =

Annual hurling competition season

2026 Kerry SHC
Tournament details
- County: Kerry
- Year: 2026
- Trophy: Neilus Flynn Cup
- Sponsor: Garvey's Supervalu
- Date: 19 June – 2 August
- Teams: 9
- Defending champions: Abbeydorney

Winners
- Champions: Abbeydorney (7th win)
- Manager: Brian O'Donovan
- Captain: James O'Connor & Michael O'Leary
- Qualify for: Munster Intermediate Club Hurling Championship

Runners-up
- Runners-up: St Brendan's
- Manager: John Rooney
- Captain: Eric Leen & Daithí Griffin

Other
- Matches played: 14
- Total scored: 50–466 (616)
- Top Scorer: Fionan Egan (St Brendan's) – 3–42 (51)
- Website: https://www.kerrygaa.ie

The 2026 Kerry Senior Hurling Championship was the 125th staging of the Kerry Senior Hurling Championship since its establishment by the Kerry County Board in 1889. The draw for the group stage pairings took place on 12 May 2026. The championship ran from 19 June to 2 August 2026.

Abbeydorney entered the championship as the defending champions.

The final was played on 2 August 2026 at Austin Stack Park in Tralee, between Abbeydorney and St Brendan's, in what was their first ever meeting in the final. Abbeydorney won the match by 3–16 to 1–12 to claim their seventh championship title overall and a third title in succession.

Fionan Egan was the championship's top scorer with 3–42.

== Group Stage ==
=== Group 1 table ===
Knockout stage

Team	Matches				Score			Pts
Team	Pld	W	D	L	For	Against	Diff	Pts
Ballyduff	2	2	0	0	50	48	2	4
St Brendan's	2	0	1	1	51	52	-1	1
Lixnaw	2	0	1	1	43	44	-1	1

=== Group 1 results ===
21 June 2016 Round 1	Lixnaw	2-17 - 1-20	St Brendan's	Austin Stack Park
	S Conway 1-11, M Kelliher 1-2, J McKenna 0-1, G O'Keeffe 0-1, A Shanahan 0-1, R Heffernan 0-1.	Report	F Egan 0-9, E Ferris 1-1, S Brosnan 0-4, L Óg O'Connor 0-3, G O'Riordan 0-2, N O'Driscoll 0-1.

28 June 2026 Round 2	Ballyduff	1-18 - 1-17	Lixnaw	Austin Stack Park
	P Boyle 0-12, L Rochford 1-0, A Segal 0-2, J Goulding 0-1, A O'Connor 0-1, J Curtin 0-1, K Goulding 0-1.	Report	S Conway 0-12, M Kelliher 1-0, E Stack 0-2, S McElligott 0-1, A Shanahan 0-1, I Conway 0-1.

5 July 2026 Round 3	St Brendan's	3-19 - 3-20	Ballyduff	Austin Stack Park
	F Egan 0-10 (5 f, 1 '65), E Ferris: 2-0, E O'Flaherty 1-0, L Óg O'Connor 0-4 (2 f), G O'Riordan 0-2, N O'Driscoll 0-1, K Wolfe 0-1, S Brosnan 0-1	Report	P Boyle 0-5 (5f), L Rochford 1-2, D Costello 1-1, A O'Connor 1-0, E Ross 0-3, J Curtin 0-3, D Moriarty 0-2, D Slattery 0-1, D O'Carroll 0-1, J Goulding 0-1

=== Group 2 table ===
Knockout stage

Team	Matches				Score			Pts
Team	Pld	W	D	L	For	Against	Diff	Pts
Causeway	2	1	1	0	47	39	8	3
Ballyheigue	2	0	2	0	39	39	0	2
Kilmoyley	1	0	1	1	36	45	-9	1

=== Group 2 results ===
21 June 2026 Round 1	Causeway	2-21 - 0-18	Kilmoyley	Austin Stack Park
	G Dooley 2-2, P McGrath 0-4, D Goggin 0-3, C Harty 0-3, B Lyons 0-2, B Barrett 0-2, K Carmody 0-2, T Casey 0-2, J Diggins 0-1.	Report	D Nolan 0-12, R Walsh 0-1, D McCarthy 0-1, P Maunsell 0-1, D Collins 0-1, J Carey 0-1, L Flaherty 0-1.

28 June 2026 Round 2	Ballyheigue	0-21 - 1-18	Causeway	Austin Stack Park
	C Walsh 0-8 (fs), P Lucid 0-6 (0-1f), R O’Halloran 0-2, D O’Sullivan 0-2; P Kenny 0-1, M Leane 0-1, M O’Sullivan 0-1.	Report	P McGrath 0-5 (0-4fs, 0-1 ‘65); B Lyons 1-1, D Goggin 0-3, T Casey 0-2, B Barrett 0-2 (0-1f), M Delaney 0-2, J Diggins 0-1, J Leahy 0-1, G Dooley 0-1.

5 July 2026 Round 3	Kilmoyley	2-12 - 1-15	Ballyheigue	Austin Stack Park
	D. McCarthy (0-4), R. Walsh (1-0 Pen), D. Collins (1-0), J. Brick (0-2), L. Flaherty (0-2), D. Nolan (0-2), P. O'Connor (0-1), J. Carey (0-1)	Report	C. Walsh (1-4), P. Lucid (0-5), N. Guerin (0-3), G. Slattery (0-1), P. Kenny (0-1), T. Gaynor (0-1)

=== Group 3 table ===
Knockout stage

Team	Matches				Score			Pts
Team	Pld	W	D	L	For	Against	Diff	Pts
Abbeydorney	2	2	0	0	43	24	19	4
Crotta O'Neill's	2	1	0	1	41	38	3	2
Tralee Parnells	2	0	0	2	27	49	-22	0

=== Group 3 results ===
19 June 2026 Round 1	Abbeydorney	3-14 - 1-06	Tralee Parnells	Austin Stack Park
	M O'Leary 0-8, A Maunsell 1-1, O Maunsell 1-0, K Sheehan 1-0, M Slattery 0-2, J Sheehan 0-2, R Donovan 0-1.	Report	E Costello 0-5, D Keane 1-0, A Morrissey 0-1.

26 June 2026 Round 2	Crotta O'Neill's	0-15 - 0-20	Abbeydorney	Austin Stack Park
	J Conway (0-9, 6f), S McElligott (0-2), G Parker (0-2), D O’Donoghue (0-1, 1 ‘65), D Kennelly (0-1).	Report	M O’Leary (0-7, 4f, 1 ‘65), M Slattery (0-4), J Sheehan (0-2), N O’Mahony (0-2), D O’Connell (0-2), O Maunsell (0-2), J Hannon (0-1).

5 July 2026 Round 3	Tralee Parnells	2-12 - 3-17	Crotta O'Neill's	Austin Stack Park
	E Costello 0-6, D Reen 1-2, O O'Brien 1-0, A Kerins 0-1, C Litchfield 0-1, D Keane 0-1, S Healy 0-1.	Report	E O'Sullivan 0-9, J Sheehan 2-1, J Conway 1-2, C White 0-2, G Parker 0-1, S McElligott 0-1, D o'Donoghue 0-1.

== Knockout stage ==
=== Quarter-finals ===
11 July 2026 Quarter-final	Crotta O'Neill's	2-11 - 5-19	St Brendan's	Austin Stack Park
	E O’Sullivan 1-4 (0-1f, 0-1 sl), B O’Mahony 0-4, J Sheehan 1-0, O Heaton 0-2, S McElligott 0-1.	Report	F Egan 1-9 (7f, ‘65’), S Brosnan 2-0, L Óg O’Connor 1-2, E O’Flaherty 1-2, H Lenihan 0-2, E Leen 0-1, G Sheehan 0-1, S O'Halloran 0-1, C Hussey 0-1.

11 July 2026 Quarter-final	Ballyheigue	1-12 - 2-22	Abbeydorney	Austin Stack Park
	D Kearney 1-1; T Gaynor 0-3; N Guerin 0-3 (1f), P Lucid 0-2, M Leane 0-1, R O’Halloran 0-1, C Walsh 0-1 (f).	Report	M O’Leary 0-6 (4f), M Slattery 1-2, J Sheehan 0-5; A Maunsell 1-1, O Maunsell 0-4, M Clifford 0-1, D Egan 0-1, N O’Mahoney 0-1, B O'Leary 0-1.

=== Semi-finals ===
18 July 2026 Semi-final	Causeway	1-15 - 5-18	St Brendan's	Austin Stack Park
	P McGrath 0-5 (5f), G Mahony 1-0, D Goggin 0-3, G Dooley, K Carmody 0-2 each, B Lyons, M Delaney, B Barrett 0-1 each.	Report	F Egan 2-9 (1-0 pen, 5f, 65’), G Sheehan 2-0, E Ferris 1-0, S Brosnan 0-3, L Óg O’Connor, C Hussey 0-2, E Leen, N O’Driscoll 0-1 each.

18 July 2026 Semi-final	Ballyduff	1-16 - 3-15	Abbeydorney	Austin Stack Park
	P Boyle 1-6 (3f), J Goulding 0-4 (1f), L Rochford 0-2, A O’Connor, D Costello, E Boyle K Goulding (f) 0-1 each	Report	M O’Leary 0-6 (4f, 65’), N O’Mahony 1-2, A Maunsell, M Slattery 1-1 each, Oisin Maunsell 0-2, D Egan, J Sheehan, J O’Connor 0-1 each.

=== Final ===
2 August 2026 Final	Abbeydorney	3-16 - 1-12	St Brendan's	Austin Stack Park
	O Maunsell (2-4), M O’Leary (0-6, 5fs, 1’65), M Slattery (1-2), J Sheehan (0-2), M Clifford and N O’Mahoney (0-1 each).	Report	F Egan (0-5, 4fs), S O’Halloran (1-0), N O’Driscoll, C Hussey and L OG O’Connor (0-2 each) D Dineen (0-1).	Referee: J O'Halloran (Limerick)

== Championship statistics ==
=== Top scorers ===
Rank	Player	Club	Tally	Total	Matches	Average
1	Fionan Egan	St Brendan's	3-42	51	5	10.20
2	Michael O'Leary	Abbeydorney	0-33	33	5	6.60
3	Shane Conway	Lixnaw	1-23	26	2	13.00
3	Pádraig Boyle	Ballyduff	1-23	26	3	8.66
5	Oisín Maunsell	Abbeydorney	3-12	21	5	4.20
6	Michael Slattery	Abbeydorney	3-11	20	5	4.00
7	Evan O'Sullivan	Crotta O'Neill's	1-13	16	2	8.00
7	Colin Walsh	Ballyheigue	1-13	16	3	5.33
7	Liam Óg O'Connor	St Brendan's	1-13	16	5	3.20
10	Seán Brosnan	St Brendan's	2-08	14	5	2.80
10	Jordan Conway	Crotta O'Neill's	1-11	14	3	4.66
10	Paul McGrath	Causeway	0-14	14	3	4.66
10	Daire Nolan	Kilmoyley	0-14	14	2	7.00

=== Miscellaneous ===
- Abbeydorney win three titles in a row for the first time in their history. They're the first side since Ballyduff between 2010-12 to do so.
- Abbeydorney and St Brendan's face each other in the final for the first time.
- Kilmoyley, current record champion with 26 wins, missed the Quarter-finals for the first time since 1999.
- Qualification for the Quarter-finals in group 1 was decided by points scored as St Brendan's and Lixnaw drew against each other and lost to Ballyduff by just 1 point.
