= 1974 Kerry Senior Hurling Championship =

Annual hurling competition season

- Dates: 21 July 1974 – 13 October 1974
- Teams: 11
- Champions: Abbeydorney (4th title); Tony Behan (captain)
- Runners-up: Austin Stacks; Garry Scollard (captain)

Tournament statistics
- Matches played: 9
- Goals scored: 43 (4.78 per match)
- Points scored: 101 (11.22 per match)

The 1974 Kerry Senior Hurling Championship was the 73rd staging of the Kerry Senior Hurling Championship since its establishment by the Kerry County Board in 1889. The draw for the opening round fixtures took place on 11 June 1974. The championship ran from 21 July 1974 to 13 October 1974.

Ballyduff entered the championship as the defending champions, however, they were beaten by Abbeydorney in the quarter-finals.

The final was played on 13 October 1974 at Austin Stack Park in Tralee, between Abbeydorney and Austin Stacks, in what was their first ever meeting in the final. Abbeydorney won the match by 3–08 to 1–04 to claim their fourth championship title overall and a first title in 61 years. It would be their last title for 50 years.

== Team changes ==
=== To Championship ===
Promoted from the Kerry Intermediate Hurling Championship

- Lixnaw

== Results ==
=== First round ===
21 July 1974 First round	Abbeydorney	8-09 - 1-06	Ballyheigue	Austin Stack Park

21 July 1974 First round	Lixnaw	5-03 - 3-04	Crotta O'Neill's	Austin Stack Park

21 July 1974 First round	Austin Stacks	w/o - scr.	Killarney

=== Quarter-finals ===
4 August 1974 Quarter-final	Lixnaw	2-05 - 1-06	Kilmoyley	Austin Stack Park
	TB McCarthy 1-3, S Thornton 1-0, M Allen 0-2.		JM Brick 0-4, PB McElligott 1-0, M Brick 0-1, M McElligott 0-1.

4 August 1974 Quarter-final	Abbeydorney	3-05 - 1-04	Ballyduff	Austin Stack Park
	T Kearney 2-0, T Behan 1-1, B Keane 0-2, T Lyons 0-1, D Brassil 0-1.		M Sullivan 1-4.

25 August 1974 Quarter-final	Causeway	5-07 - 0-05	Roughty Rangers	Austin Stack Park

25 August 1974 Quarter-final	Austin Stacks	2-06 - 1-05	St Brendan's	Austin Stack Park

=== Semi-finals ===
15 September 1974 Semi-final	Abbeydorney	2-06 - 1-05	Causeway	Austin Stack Park
	T Lyons 1-0, J Condon 1-0, J Behan 0-2, P Treacy 0-2, T Behan 0-1, B Keane 0-1.		P Moriarty 1-2, J Regan 0-3.

29 September 1974 Semi-final	Austin Stacks	3-05 - 1-08	Lixnaw	Austin Stack Park
	N Shehey 2-0, M Lynch 1-1, L Heffernan 0-4.		T Bawn McCarthy 0-5, F Thornton 1-1, M Murphy 0-1, M McKenna 0-1.

=== Final ===
13 October 1974 Final	Abbeydorney	3-08 - 1-04	Austin Stacks	Austin Stack Park
	J Condon 3-0, B Keane 0-4, J Behan 0-2, T Behan 0-1, P Treacy 0-1.		N Power 1-0, L Heffernan 0-3, N Sheehy 0-1.	Referee: B Cross (Limerick)

== Championship statistics ==
=== Miscellaneous ===
- Abbeydorney won the championship for the first time since 1913.
- Austin Stacks make their final appearance in the final.
- Abbeydorney and Austin Stacks faced each other in the final for the first time.
