= 2024 Kerry Senior Hurling Championship =

Annual hurling competition season

- Dates: 15 June – 4 August 2024
- Teams: 10
- Sponsor: Garvey's SuperValu
- Champions: Abbeydorney (5th title); James O'Connor (captain); Francis O'Halloran (manager)
- Runners-up: Ballyduff; Pádraig Boyle (captain); Barry O'Grady (manager)

Tournament statistics
- Matches played: 20
- Goals scored: 58 (2.9 per match)
- Points scored: 738 (36.9 per match)
- Top scorer(s): Michael O'Leary (3-42)

The 2024 Kerry Senior Hurling Championship was the 123rd staging of the Kerry Senior Hurling Championship since its establishment by the Kerry County Board in 1889. The draw for the group stage pairings took place on 22 April 2024. The championship ran from 15 June to 4 August 2024.

Crotta O'Neill's entered the championship as the defending champions, however, they were beaten by Ballyheigue in the quarter-finals.

The final was played on 4 August 2024 at Austin Stack Park in Tralee, between Abbeydorney and Ballyduff, in what was their first ever meeting in the final. Abbeydorney won the match by 1–17 to 1–10 to claim their fifth championship title overall and a first title in 50 years.

== Format change ==
A new format was created after the addition of a 10th team to the championship. The idea of two groups of five teams was rejected after a meeting with the clubs. As a result the clubs and the Kerry County Board decided upon a three-group format; one group containing four teams, and two containing three, making up the ten teams. No team was eliminated from the championship at the end of the group phase. Instead the top two teams in each group qualified directly for the quarter-finals. The remaining four teams (the bottom two sides in the four-team group, and the bottom sides in the two three-team groups) played off in preliminary quarter-finals to join the other six sides. From that point on it was a knock-out competition.

== Team changes ==
=== To championship ===
Promoted from the Kerry Intermediate Hurling Championship

- Tralee Parnells

== Group A ==
=== Group A table ===
Quarter-finalists Preliminary quarter-finalists

| Team | Matches | | | | Score | | | Pts |
| Team | Pld | W | D | L | For | Against | Diff | Pts |
|---|---|---|---|---|---|---|---|---|
| Ballyduff | 3 | 3 | 0 | 0 | 64 | 50 | 14 | 6 |
| Crotta O'Neill's | 3 | 2 | 0 | 1 | 55 | 53 | 2 | 4 |
| Causeway | 3 | 1 | 0 | 2 | 61 | 60 | 1 | 2 |
| St Brendan's | 3 | 0 | 0 | 3 | 46 | 63 | -17 | 0 |

=== Group A results ===
| 15 June 2024 Round 1 | Ballyduff | 1-15 - 0-16 | St Brendan's | Austin Stack Park |
| | J Goulding (0-6, 4fs), P Boyle (0-4fs), J O’Sullivan (1-0), D Slattery, D Carroll, D Moriarty, J P O’Carroll and L Rochford (0-1 each). | Report | F Egan (0-10, 8fs), N O’Driscoll (0-3), S O’Halloran (0-2), and G Horan (0-1). |

| 16 June 2024 Round 1 | Crotta O'Neill's | 1-19 - 0-15 | Causeway | Austin Stack Park |
| | S Nolan 0-14 (13fs), J Conway 1-1, C Trant 0-2, J Sheehan and S McElligott 0-1 each | Report | D Goggin 0-5, K Carmody 0-3 (1f, 1’65), B Barrett (2fs), T Casey 0-2 each, J Diggins, C Harty, D Mahoney, 0-1 each |

| 22 June 2024 Round 2 | Causeway | 1-17 - 2-17 | Ballyduff | Austin Stack Park |
| | B Barrett 0-10 (8fs, 1 ‘65), B Lyons 1-0, D Goggin 0-3, C Harty 0-2, K Carmody, E Murphy (f) 0-1 each | Report | J Goulding 1-7, (6fs), L Rochford 1-1, K Goulding, J Sullivan 0-3 each, E Boyle, D Moriarty, D Carroll 0-1 each |

| 22 June 2024 Round 2 | St Brendan's | 1-12 - 0-19 | Crotta O'Neill's | Austin Stack Park |
| | F Egan 0-8 (5fs), L Óg O’Connor 1-0, G O’Riordan 0-2, M Davis, S Brosnan, 0-1 each | Report | S Nolan (3fs), C Trant, J Conway (2f) 0-3 each, A Behan 0-2, Darragh O’Donoghue, T O’Connor, C White, J Sheehan, Declan O’Donoghue, R Mahony, S McElligott, G Parker 0-1 each |

| 28 June 2024 Round 3 | Ballyduff | 3-14 - 0-14 | Crotta O'Neill's | Austin Stack Park |
| | D Moriarty (0-6, 5fs), L Rochford (1-2), A Segal (1-1), D Goulding (1-0), K Boyle (0-2, 1f, 1’65), J Bowler, Darragh Goulding and T Grady (0-1 each) | Report | S McElligott (1f) and G Parker (0-4each), S Murnane (1f) and Declan O’Donoghue (1f) (0-2 each), C White and R Nolan (0-1 each) |

| 28 June 2024 Round 3 | Causeway | 3-17 - 0-15 | St Brendan's | Healy Park |
| | B Barrett 2-2 (2fs), D Goggin 1-2, C Harty 0-3, P McGrath (1f) 0-3 each, K Carmody, E Murphy, T Casey 0-2 each, D Mahoney 0-1. | Report | L Óg O’Connor (2f), S Brosnan 0-3 each, F Egan (2f), G Horan, G O’Riordan 0-2 each, N O’Driscoll, E Ferris, E Leen 0-1 each |

== Group B ==
=== Group B table ===
Quarter-finalists Preliminary quarter-finalists

| Team | Matches | | | | Score | | | Pts |
| Team | Pld | W | D | L | For | Against | Diff | Pts |
|---|---|---|---|---|---|---|---|---|
| Abbeydorney | 2 | 2 | 0 | 0 | 59 | 29 | 30 | 4 |
| Lisnaw | 2 | 1 | 0 | 1 | 37 | 43 | -6 | 2 |
| Tralee Parnells | 2 | 0 | 0 | 2 | 22 | 46 | -24 | 0 |

=== Group B results ===
| 14 June 2024 Round 1 | Lixnaw | 0-16 - 0-14 | Tralee Parnells | Austin Stack Park |
| | T Brosnan 0-5 (4fs, 1 65), E Stack 0-3, S McElligott 0-2, C Sheehy, J Brosnan, K Molloy, J Galvin, R Heffernan 0-1 each | Report | O O’Brien 0-7 (5fs), G O’Doherty 0-5fs, E Sheehy, M Madden 0-1 each |

| 23 June 2024 Round 2 | Tralee Parnells | 0-08 - 1-27 | Abbeydorney | Austin Stack Park |
| | O O’Brien 0-3 (2fs), S Healy 0-2 (1f), S Morrissey, G O’Doherty (f), J Sherman, (0-1 each) | Report | M O’Leary 0-11 (5fs, 1 ‘65), B O’Leary 1-1, D Egan, C O’Sullivan 0-3 each, J Sheehan 0-2, M Clifford, K O’Connor, D O’Leary, N O’Mahoney, O Maunsell (f), J Hannon, J O’Connor, 0-1 each |

| 29 June 2024 Round 3 | Abbeydorney | 5-14 - 1-18 | Lixnaw | Austin Stack Park |
| | M O’Leary 3-8 (1-0 pen, 4fs, 2 ‘65’), O Maunsell 1-2, D O’Leary 1-1, M Clifford, N O’Mahoney, J Sheehan 0-1 each | Report | S Conway 1-7, R Heffernan 0-4 (4fs), R Galvin, J Brosnan 0-2 each, C Sheehy, E Stack, J Galvin, 0-1 each |

== Group C ==
=== Group C table ===
Quarter-finalists Preliminary quarter-finalists

| Team | Matches | | | | Score | | | Pts |
| Team | Pld | W | D | L | For | Against | Diff | Pts |
|---|---|---|---|---|---|---|---|---|
| Ballyheigue | 2 | 2 | 0 | 0 | 48 | 29 | 19 | 4 |
| Kilmoyley | 2 | 1 | 0 | 1 | 39 | 33 | 6 | 2 |
| Dr Crokes | 2 | 0 | 0 | 2 | 33 | 58 | -25 | 0 |

=== Group C results ===
| 15 June 2024 Round 1 | Ballyheigue | 0-16 - 0-13 | Kilmoyley | Austin Stack Park |
| | P Lucid (0-12, 10 fs, 1’65), F O’Sullivan (0-2), B O’Riordan and E Walsh (0-1 each). | Report | R Walsh (0-11, 7fs, 1’65)), D Corridon and P Maunsell (0-1 each) |

| 21 June 2024 Round 2 | Ballyheigue | 2-26 - 0-16 | Dr Crokes | Austin Stack Park |
| | P Lucid 1-11 (3f), E Walsh 1-4, F O’Sullivan 0-4, M Leane and D O’Mahony 0-2, each T Gaynor, C Walsh (65), N Guerin 0-1 each | Report | M Heffernan 0-8 (7fs, 1 ‘65’), C O’Hare 0-4, T Doyle 0-2, K Landers, and O Hayes 0-1 each |

| 27 June 2024 Round 3 | Dr Crokes | 1-14 - 1-23 | Kilmoyley | Lewis Road |
| | M Heffernan 0-10 (8fs), C O’Cuiv 1-0, T Doyle 0-3, D Carroll 0-1 | Report | R Walsh 0-11 (9fs), P Maunsell 1-2, T Brick 0-4, D Collins, P O’Connor 0-2 each, B O’Connor, D Fitzell, 0-1 each |

== Knockout stage ==
=== Preliminary quarter-finals ===
| 5 July 2024 Preliminary quarter-final | Causeway | 4-17 - 1-12 | Dr Crokes | Austin Stack Park |
| | B Barrett 1-6 (5fs), K Carmody 1-3, J Diggins 1-1, C Harty 1-0, D Goggin, P McGrath (1f) 0-3 each, D Legg 0-1. | Report | M Heffernan 0-10 (9fs), C O’Cuiv 1-0, C O’Hare, W Allen 0-1 each. |

| 5 July 2024 Preliminary quarter-final | St Brendan's | 2-21 - 1-08 | Tralee Parnells | Healy Park |
| | L Óg O'Connor 0-8, E Ferris 1-2, G Horan 1-2, S O'Halloran 0-4, N O'Driscoll 0-3, G O'Riordan 0-1, S Brosnan 0-1. | Report | O O'Brien 0-4, T Brick 1-0, C Dunne 0-2, E Sheehy 0-1, S Healy 0-1. |

=== Quarter-finals ===
| 12 July 2024 Quarter-final | Abbeydorney | 2-15 - 1-13 | St Brendan's | Austin Stack Park |
| | M O’Leary 0-7 (6fs), O Maunsell 2-1, D O’Leary 0-4, J Sheehan 0-2, D Egan 0-1. | Report | F Egan 0-10 (8fs), S O’Halloran 1-0, S Brosnan, N O’Driscoll, D Dineen 0-1 each |

| 13 July 2024 Quarter-final | Ballyduff | 3-15 - 1-16 | Lixnaw | Austin Stack Park |
| | P Boyle (1-7, 3fs), D Moriarty (1-1), E Boyle (1-0), J O’Sullivan and L Rochford (0-2 each), D Slattery, D O’Carroll and M Boyle (0-1 each) | Report | S Conway (0-7, 6fs), C O’Keeffe (1-0), R Heffernan (0-3,2fs), C Sheehy (0-2), D Conway, J Brosnan, E Stack, and S McElligott (0-1 each) |

| 14 July 2024 Quarter-final | Ballyheigue | 3-24 - 2-22 (aet) | Crotta O'Neill's | Austin Stack Park |
| | P Lucid ( 1-15, 12fs, 1’65), M Leane ( 0-4), C Casey and P Kenny ( 1-0 each), D O’Sullivan, F O’Sullivan, T Gaynor, B O’Riordan, and E Walsh ( 0-1 each) | Report | S Nolan (2-10, 1-8 frees, 1’65), J Conway ( 0-4,1f), R Mahony ( 0-3), G Parker ( 0-2), C Trant, T O’Connor, Declan O’Donoghue ( 0-1each) |

| 14 July 2024 Quarter-final | Kilmoyley | 3-16 - 3-13 | Causeway | Austin Stack Park |
| | R Walsh (0-6,3fs, 1’65), D Collins ( 0-5), P Maunsell ( 1-1), R Collins ( f) and K McCarthy ( 1-0 each), M O’Connor ( 0-3), D Nolan ( 0-1). | Report | B Barrett (1-5, 5fs, 1-0 pen), D Goggin ( 1-2), G Dooley ( 1-00, J Diggins ( 0-3), C Harty ( 0-2), P McGrath ( 0-1f) |

=== Semi-finals ===
| 20 July 2024 Semi-final | Abbeydorney | 1-18 - 0-10 | Ballyheigue | Austin Stack Park |
| | M O’Leary (0-9, 8f), O Maunsell (1-2), M Clifford, J O’Connor, R Donavan, D O’Leary, C O’Sullivan, J Sheehan, and D Egan ( 0-1 each). | Report | P Lucid ( 0-6, 5fs), M Leane, E Walsh, D O’Mahony and J Goggin ( 0-1 each) |

| 20 July 2024 Semi-final | Kilmoyley | 2-25 - 4-25 | Ballyduff | Austin Stack Park |
| | R Walsh ( 0-15, 9fs), P Maunsell ( 1-2), T Murnane ( 1-0), M O’Connor ( 0-3), J Brick ( 0-2), C Savage, D Collins ( 1f) and B O’Connor ( 0-1 each). | Report | P Boyle ( 2-12, 8fs,1’65), J Goulding ( 1-3), K Boyle ( 1-0), L Rochford (0-3), J Enright and K Goulding ( 0-2 each), J P O’Carroll, E Boyle and J O’Sullivan ( 0-1 each) |

=== Final ===
| 4 August 2024 Final | Abbeydorney | 1-17 - 1-10 | Ballyduff | Austin Stack Park |
| | M O’Leary (0-7, 6fs), O Maunsell (1-2), D O’Leary and J Sheehan (0-2 each), J O’Connor, N O’Mahoney, C O’Sullivan and B O’Leary (0-1 each). | Report | J O’Sullivan (1-2), P Boyle (0-4, 0-2fs, 1’65), K Goulding, A Segal, J Goulding and E Boyle (0-1 each). |

== Championship statistics ==
=== Top scorers ===
Overall

| Rank | Player | County | Tally | Total | Matches | Average |
|---|---|---|---|---|---|---|
| 1 | Michael O'Leary | Abbeydorney | 3-42 | 51 | 5 | 10.20 |
| 2 | Philip Lucid | Ballyheigue | 2-44 | 50 | 4 | 12.50 |
| 3 | Ronan Walsh | Kilmoyley | 0-43 | 43 | 4 | 10.75 |
| 4 | Brandon Barrett | Causeway | 4-25 | 37 | 6 | 6.16 |
| 5 | Pádraig Boyle | Ballyduff | 3-27 | 35 | 5 | 7.00 |
| 6 | Shane Nolan | Crotta O'Neill's | 2-27 | 33 | 3 | 11.00 |
| 7 | Fionan Egan | St Brendan's | 0-30 | 30 | 4 | 7.50 |
| 8 | Mark Heffernan | Dr Crokes | 0-28 | 28 | 3 | 9.33 |
| 9 | Oisín Maunsell | Abbeydorney | 5-08 | 21 | 5 | 4.20 |
| 9 | Jack Goulding | Ballyduff | 2-17 | 23 | 4 | 5.75 |

Single game

| Rank | Player | Club | Tally | Total | Opposition |
|---|---|---|---|---|---|
| 1 | Pádraig Boyle | Ballyduff | 2-12 | 18 | Kilmoyley |
| 1 | Philip Lucid | Ballyheigue | 1-15 | 18 | Crotta O'Neill's |
| 3 | Michael O'Leary | Abbeydorney | 3-08 | 17 | Lixnaw |
| 4 | Shane Nolan | Crotta O'Neill's | 2-10 | 16 | Ballyheigue |
| 5 | Ronan Walsh | Kilmoyley | 0-15 | 15 | Ballyduff |
| 6 | Philip Lucid | Ballyheigue | 1-11 | 14 | Dr Crokes |
| 7 | Shane Nolan | Crotta O'Neill's | 0-14 | 14 | Causeway |
| 8 | Philip Lucid | Ballyheigue | 0-12 | 12 | Kilmoyley |
| 9 | Ronan Walsh | Kilmoyley | 0-11 | 11 | Dr Crokes |
| 9 | Ronan Walsh | Kilmoyley | 0-11 | 11 | Ballyheigue |
| 9 | Michael O'Leary | Abbeydorney | 0-11 | 11 | Tralee Parnells |

=== Miscellaneous ===
- Abbeydorney won the championship for the first time since 1974.
- Abbeydorney reached the championship final for the first time since 2005.
- Abbeydorney and Ballyduff faced each other in the final for the first time.
- Tralee Parnells make their first appearance at senior level since 1924.
