= 2025 Kerry Senior Hurling Championship =

Annual hurling competition season

- Dates: 13 June – 3 August 2025
- Teams: 9
- Sponsor: Garvey's SuperValu
- Champions: Abbeydorney (6th title); James O'Connor (captain); Francis O'Halloran (manager)
- Runners-up: Ballyduff; Jack O'Sullivan (captain); Pádraig Harrington (manager)

Tournament statistics
- Matches played: 14
- Goals scored: 40 (2.86 per match)
- Points scored: 474 (33.86 per match)
- Top scorer(s): Pádraig Boyle (1–33)

The 2025 Kerry Senior Hurling Championship was the 124th staging of the Kerry Senior Hurling Championship since its establishment by the Kerry County Board in 1889. The draw for the group stage pairings took place on 12 May 2025. The championship ran from 13 June to 3 August 2025.

Abbeydorney entered the championship as the defending champions.

The final was played on 3 August 2025 at Austin Stack Park in Tralee, between Abbeydorney and Ballyduff, in what was their second consecutive meeting in the final. Abbeydorney won the match by 0–23 to 0–17 to claim their sixth championship title overall and a second title in succession.

Ballyduff's Pádraig Boyle was the championship's top scorer with 1–33.

== Group A ==
=== Group A table ===
Knockout stage

Team	Matches				Score			Pts
Team	Pld	W	D	L	For	Against	Diff	Pts
St Brendan's	2	2	0	0	44	37	7	4
Ballyduff	2	1	0	1	36	39	-3	2
Crotta O'Neill's	2	0	0	2	45	49	-4	0

=== Group A results ===
15 June 2025 Round 1	St Brendan's	1-23 - 3-15	Crotta O'Neill's	Austin Stack Park
	F Egan (0-8, 6fs, 1x65’), S Brosnan (1-2), N O’Driscoll (0-4), L Og O’Connor (0-3), G O’Riordan and S O’Halloran (0-2 each), E O’Flaherty and J Egan (0-1 each).	Report	S Nolan (1-10, 1-0 pen, 8fs, 1x’65), J Conway (2-0), B Mahony and E O’Sullivan (0-2 each), S McElligott (0-1).

22 June 2025 Round 2	Crotta O'Neill's	1-18 - 1-20	Ballyduff	Austin Stack Park
	S Nolan (1-8, 1-5fs), J Conway (0-3), B Mahony, C Trant and S McElligott (0-2 each), O Heaton (0-1)	Report	P Boyle (1-11, 1-10fs), E Boyle and J Enright (0-2 each), A Segal, A Kavanagh, D Moriarty, L Rochford and S Carrig (0-1 each)

28 June 2025 Round 3	Ballyduff	0-13 - 3-09	St Brendan's	Austin Stack Park
	P Boyle (0-7, 4fs), A Kavanagh and K Boyle (1f) (0-2 each), L Rochford and D Moriarty (0-1 each)	Report	F Egan (2-4, 1-2fs), L Óg O’Connor (1-2), E O’Flaherty (0-2), S Brosnan (0-1).

== Group B ==
=== Group B table ===
Knockout stage

Team	Matches				Score			Pts
Team	Pld	W	D	L	For	Against	Diff	Pts
Kilmoyley	2	2	0	0	44	39	5	4
Ballyheigue	2	1	0	1	39	37	2	2
Lixnaw	2	0	0	2	32	39	-7	0

=== Group B results ===
15 June 2025 Round 1	Kilmoyley	1-20 - 1-18	Ballyheigue	Austin Stack Park
	R Collins ( 1-13, 8fs, 2x65’s), J Brick and D Collins ( 0-2 each), B O’Connor, D McCarthy and P O’Connor ( 0-1 each).	Report	P Lucid (0-9, 6fs), C Casey (1-2), N Guerin (0-3), C Walsh (0-2), F O’Sullivan and P Kenny (0-1 each).

22 June 2025 Round 2	Lixnaw	0-18 - 2-15	Kilmoyley	Austin Stack Park
		Report

27 June 2025 Round 3	Ballyheigue	0-18 - 0-14	Lixnaw	Austin Stack Park
	P Lucid (0-8, 5fs), D O’Sullivan and F O’Sullivan (0-3 each), C Casey, N Guerin, M Leane and R O’Halloran (0-1 each).	Report	S Conway (0-7, 5fs), I Conway and E Stack (0-2 each), G O’Keeffe, R Heffernan (f) and K Molloy (0-1 each).

== Group C ==
=== Group C table ===
Knockout stage

Team	Matches				Score			Pts
Team	Pld	W	D	L	For	Against	Diff	Pts
Abbeydorney	2	2	0	0	59	33	26	4
Causeway	2	0	1	1	39	49	-10	1
Tralee Parnells	2	0	1	1	38	54	-16	1

=== Group C results ===
13 June 2025 Round 1	Abbeydorney	1-24 - 1-14	Causeway	Austin Stack Park
	J Sheehan 1-5, M Slattery 0-8, D Egan 0-2, M O'Leary 0-2, N O'Mahony 0-2, C O'Sullivan 0-1, M Clifford 0-1, K Sheehan 0-1.	Report	B Barrett 0-4, K Carmody 0-4, C Harty 1-0, P McGrath 0-1, M Murphy 0-2, G Dooley 0-1.

22 June 2025 Round 2	Causeway	1-19 - 4-10	Tralee Parnells	Austin Stack Park
	K Carmody (0-8, 4fs, ’45), M Murphy (1-1), C Harty (0-4), B Barrett (0-2), B Lyons, J Leahy, D Legg, and G Dooley (0-1 each)	Report	E Costello (1-6, 5fs), O O’Brien (1-1), D Quirke and S Healy (1-0 each), C Litchfield (0-2), E Sheehy (0-1)

28 June 2025 Round 3	Tralee Parnells	1-13 - 5-17	Abbeydorney	Austin Stack Park
	E Costello (1-9, 6fs), D Moloney (0-2 fs), S Healy and O O’Brien (0-1 each).	Report	J Sheehan (3-1), M Slattery (1-4, 2fs), M O’Leary (0-7, 6fs), K Varian (1-0), C O’Sullivan and B O’Leary (0-2 each), O Maunsell (0-1).

== Knockout stage ==
=== Quarter-finals ===
13 July 2025 Quarter-final	Ballyduff	0-22 - 1-18	Causeway	Austin Stack Park
	D Moriarty (0-8, 7fs), K O’Connor and K Boyle (0-3 each), E Boyle and J Enright (0-2 each), A Segal, D O’Carroll, L Rochford and P Boyle (0-1 each).	Report	K Carmody (0-10, 5 65’s, 4fs), B Barrett (1-0), G Dooley (0-3), C Harty and B Lyons (0-2 each), B Barrett (0-1),

13 July 2025 Quarter-final	St Brendan's	0-20 - 3-16	Ballyheigue	Austin Stack Park
	F Egan (0-8, 5fs), L Og O’Connor (0-3, 1f), H Lenihan and S Brosnan (0-3 each), G O’Riordan ( 0-2), E O’Flaherty (0-1).	Report	P Lucid (1-5, 1-0 pen, 2fs), M Leane (1-3), P Kenny (1-1), T Gaynor and F O’Sullivan (f) (0-2 each), S Foran, C Casey and S Foran (0-1 each)

=== Semi-finals ===
19 July 2025 Semi-final	Abbeydorney	4-15 - 1-15	Kilmoyley	Austin Stack Park
19:00	M Slattery (4-2), M O’Leary (0-9,9fs), J Sheehan (0-2), O Maunsell and K Varian (0-1 each).	Report	R Collins (0-7, 6fs, 1 '65), M O’Connor (1-1), R Walsh and D Collins (0-3 each), D McCarthy (0-1).	Referee: Simon Stokes (Limerick)

19 July 2025 Semi-final	Ballyduff	2-18 - 3-12	Ballyheigue	Austin Stack Park
17:00	P Boyle (0-6, 2fs), A O’Connor (1-1), K Boyle (1-0), D Moriarty (0-4, 3fs), S Carrig (0-2), E Boyle, A Segal, J Enright, L Rochford, K O’Carroll (0-1 each).	Report	F O’Sullivan (0-7, 3fs), C Walsh (1-2), E Walsh, S Foran (1-0 each), T Gaynor (0-2), P Lucid (0-1).	Referee: Patrick O'Mahony (Cork)

=== Final ===
3 August 2025 Final	Abbeydorney	0-23 - 0-17	Ballyduff	Austin Stack Park
	M O’Leary ( 0-11, 10fs, 1x65), O Maunsell ( 0-5), M Slattery ( 0-3), J O’Connor, C O’Sullivan, K Varian and , R Ó hAiniféin ( 0-1 each).	Report	P Boyle (0-8, 7’s), J Enright (0-3), D Moriarty and L Rochford (0-2 each), E Boyle and K Goulding (0-1 each).	Referee: J Bugler (Clare)

== Championship statistics ==
=== Top scorers ===
Rank	Player	Club	Tally	Total	Matches	Average
1	Pádraig Boyle	Ballyduff	1-33	36	5	7.20
1	Michael Slattery	Abbeydorney	5-17	32	4	8.00
3	Michael O'Leary	Abbeydorney	0-29	29	4	7.25

=== Miscellaneous ===
- The final was notable as it was the first time Abbeydorney reatined the title, having reached consecutive finals for the first time in their history. Ballyduff lost consecutive finals for the first time in their history.
