= Ronan Walsh (hurler) =

Irish hurler (born 2003)

Personal information
- Native name: Ronán Breathnach (Irish)
- Born: 2003 (age 22–23) Kilmoyley; County Kerry, Ireland
- Occupation: Student

Sport
- Sport: Hurling
- Position: Right wing-forward
Club
- Years: Club
- 2021-present: Kilmoyley
Club titles
- Kerry titles: 1
College
- Years: College
- MTU Cork
College titles
- Fitzgibbon titles: 0
Inter-county
- Years: County
- 2023-present: Kerry
Inter-county titles
- All-Irelands: 0
- NHL: 0
- All Stars: 0

Ronan Walsh (born 2003) is an Irish hurler. At club level he plays with Kilmoyley and at inter-county level with the Kerry senior hurling team.

== Career ==
Walsh first played hurling at juvenile and underage levels with the Kilmoyley club, before progressing to adult club level. He came on as a substitute to win a Kerry SHC medal after a defeat of St Brendan's in 2021. He later added a Munster Club IHC title, however, Kilmoyley were beaten by Naas in the 2022 All-Ireland intermediate club final.

Walsh first appeared on the inter-county scene with Kerry as a member of the minor team in 2020. He later spent three consecutive seasons with the under-20 team. Walsh was drafted onto the senior team for the 2023 Munster Senior Hurling League.

== Honours ==
Kilmoyley

- Munster Intermediate Club Hurling Championship: 2021
- Kerry Senior Hurling Championship: 2021
